= Basketball Champions League Asia records and statistics =

This page details statistics of the Basketball Champions League Asia, including the FIBA Asia Champions Cup (1981-2019).

== Clubs ==
=== Titles by club ===
Performances in the Basketball Champions League Asia by club
Club	Titles	Runners-up	Years won	Years runners-up
(Lebanon) Al Riyadi	3	4	2011, 2017, 2024	2012, 2016, 2019, 2025
(Lebanon) Sagesse	3	0	1999, 2000, 2004	—
(Qatar) Al-Rayyan	2	5	2002, 2005	2001, 2003, 2008, 2010, 2013
(Iran) Mahram Tehran	2	2	2009, 2010	2011, 2012
(Iran) Saba Battery Tehran	2	0	2007, 2008	
(China) Liaoning Hunters	1	3	1990	1988, 1992, 1999
(Saudi Arabia) Al-Ittihad	1	2	2001	2000, 2002
(Jordan) Zain	1	2	2006	2005, 2009
(Syria) Al-Wahda	1	1	2003	2004
(South Korea) Kia Motors	1	1	1992	1997
(China) Bayi Rockets	1	1	1981	1984
(Hong Kong) Regal	1	1	1997	1998
Xinjiang Flying Tigers / China Kashgar	1	1	2016	2017
(Japan) Alvark Tokyo	1	1	2019	2018
(Iran) Petrochimi Bandar Imam	1	0	2018	—
(Philippines) Northern Cement	1	0	1984	—
(Philippines) Swift	1	0	1988	—
(Philippines) Andok's	1	0	1995	—
(Philippines) Hapee Toothpaste	1	0	1996	—
(China) Beijing Hanwei	1	0	1998	—
(Iran) Foolad Mahan Isfahan	1	0	2013	—
(Japan) Utsunomiya Brex	1	0	2025	—
(Syria) Al-Jalaa Aleppo	0	2	—	2006, 2007
(Malaysia) Petronas	0	1	—	1995
(Japan) Nippon Kokan	0	1	—	1981
(South Korea) Bank of Korea	0	1	—	1990
(Japan) Isuzu Lynx	0	1	—	1996
(United Arab Emirates) Shabab Al Ahli	0	1	—	2024

=== Semi-final appearances by club ===
Only seasons which had single-elimination semifinals were included, which were introduced in the 1995 ABC Champions Cup.

Team	No.	Years
(Qatar) Al Rayyan	11	2001, **2002**, 2003, 2004, **2005**, 2006, 2007, 2008, 2010, 2011, 2013
(Lebanon) Al Riyadi Beirut	11	1998, 2008, 2009, 2010, **2011**, 2012, 2016, **2017**, 2019, **2024**, 2025
(Saudi Arabia) Al-Ittihad Jeddah	6	1999, 2000, **2001**, 2002, 2003, 2006
(Syria) Al Wahda	4	2001, 2002, **2003**, **2004**
(Iran) Mahram Tehran	4	**2009**, **2010**, 2011, 2012
(Lebanon) Sagesse	4	**1999**, **2000**, **2004**, 2005
(Jordan) Fastlink / Zain	3	2005, **2006**, 2009
(Iran) Petrochimi Bandar Imam	3	2016, 2017, **2018**
(Malaysia) Petronas	3	1995, 1996, 1999
(Iran) Saba Battery Tehran	3	2005, **2007**, **2008**
(South Korea) Sangmu	3	2002, 2003, 2004
(Syria) Al-Jalaa Aleppo	2	2006, 2007
(Japan) Alvark Tokyo	2	2018, **2019**
(Jordan) ASU †	2	2010, 2013
(Japan) Isuzu Lynx	2	1996, 1997
(South Korea) Kia Motors	2	1995, 1997
(Hong Kong) Regal	2	**1997**, 1998
(United Arab Emirates) Shabab Al Ahli	2	2024, 2025
Xinjiang Flying Tigers / China Kashgar	2	**2016**, 2017
(Jordan) Al Ahli Amman	1	1995
(United Arab Emirates) Al Ahli Dubai	1	2016
(Qatar) Al-Arabi	1	2009
(Bahrain) Al-Hala	1	2013
(Bahrain) Al-Muharraq	1	2019
(United Arab Emirates) Al-Wasl	1	2008
(Philippines) Andok's	1	**1995**
(Indonesia) ASPAC	1	1997
(Kazakhstan) Astana	1	2017
(Turkmenistan) Belent Ashgabat	1	2012
(Iraq) Duhok	1	2012
(Iran) Foolad Mahan Isfahan	1	**2013**
(China) Guangdong Winnerway	1	1996
(China) Hanwei	1	**1998**
(Philippines) Hapee Toothpaste	1	**1996**
(Japan) Hiroshima Dragonflies	1	2024
(South Korea) Hyundai Dynat	1	1998
(China) Liaoning Hunters	1	1999
(Bahrain) Manama	1	2000
(Philippines) Meralco Bolts	1	2018
(Iran) Palayesh Naft Abadan	1	2019
(Kuwait) Qadsia	1	2000
(Philippines) San Miguel Beermen	1	2007
(South Korea) Seoul SK Knights	1	2018
(Iran) Shahrdari Gorgan	1	2024
(Philippines) Smart Gilas	1	2011
(Hong Kong) Winling	1	2001
(Mongolia) Ulaanbaatar Xac Broncos	1	2025
(Japan) Utsunomiya Brex	1	**2025**

=== Number of participating clubs in the BCL Asia ===
Since the inaugural edition a total of 118 teams from 29 FIBA member nations have participated in the tournament, excluding teams that were on the initial team list but were disqualified or withdrew before the season. Years in bold denote the team won the championship in that given season.

As of June 10, 2025.

Nation	No.	Clubs	Years
Philippines (11)	7	Philippines men's national team (Note: The Philippines men's national basketball team has competed in FIBA competitions under sponsored names. They were known as "Northern Cement" (1984) "San Miguel Beer" (2005), "San Miguel-Magnolia" (2007), "Smart Gilas" (2009–2011) and "Chooks-to-Go Pilipinas" (2017).)	**1984**, 2005, 2007, 2009, 2010, 2011, 2017
Philippines (11)	2	Meralco Bolts	2018, 2025
Philippines (11)	1	Andok's	**1995**
Philippines (11)	1	Apcor	1981
Philippines (11)	1	Beeper 150	1998
Philippines (11)	1	Hapee Toothpaste	**1996**
Philippines (11)	1	Mediatrix Telecom	2004
Philippines (11)	1	Pasig-Rizal Pirates	1999
Philippines (11)	1	Spring Cooking Oil	2002
Philippines (11)	1	Swift-PABL	**1988**
Philippines (11)	1	Tanduay Gold Rhum	1997
Iran (10)	5	Zob Ahan Isfahan (Note: Played as "Shahrdari Isfahan" (1990).)	1990, 1995, 1997, 2000, 2001
Iran (10)	4	Mahram Tehran	**2009**, **2010**, 2011, 2012
Iran (10)	4	Saba Battery Tehran	2005, 2006, **2007**, **2008**
Iran (10)	3	Petrochimi Bandar Imam	2016, 2017, **2018**
Iran (10)	1	Foolad Mahan Isfahan	**2013**
Iran (10)	1	Palayesh Naft Abadan	2019
Iran (10)	1	Paykan Tehran	1996
Iran (10)	1	Sanam Tehran	2003
Iran (10)	1	Shahrdari Gorgan	2024
Iran (10)	1	Tabiat	2025
South Korea (9)	4	Sangmu Phoenix	2002, 2003, 2004, 2009
South Korea (9)	4	Ulsan Phoebus (Note: Played as "Kia Motors" (1992, 1995, 1997).)	**1992**, 1995, 1997, 2019
South Korea (9)	2	Busan KCC Egis (Note: Played as "Hyundai Dynat" (1998).)	1998, 2024
South Korea (9)	1	Bank of Korea	1990
South Korea (9)	1	Changwon LG Sakers	2025
South Korea (9)	1	Industry Bank	1981
South Korea (9)	1	Samsung Electronics	1988
South Korea (9)	1	Seoul SK Knights	2018
South Korea (9)	1	Tong Yang	1996
Japan (8)	2	Alvark Tokyo	2018, **2019**
Japan (8)	2	Isuzu Giga Cats (Note: Played as "Isuzu Lynx" (1996).)	1996, 1997
Japan (8)	1	Hiroshima Dragonflies	2024
Japan (8)	1	Japan Energy	1995
Japan (8)	1	JBL	1999
Japan (8)	1	Nippon Kokan	1981
Japan (8)	1	Toshiba Red Thunders	1998
Japan (8)	1	Utsunomiya Brex	**2025**
China (7)	7	Liaoning Flying Leopards (Note: Played as "Liaoning Hunters" (1995, 1999).)	1988, **1990**, 1992, 1995, 1999, 2018, 2024
China (7)	2	Bayi Rockets	**1981**, 1984
China (7)	2	Guangdong Southern Tigers (Note: Played as "Guangdong Winnerway" (1996).)	1996, 2019
China (7)	2	Xinjiang Flying Tigers (Note: Played as "China Kashgar" (2016).)	**2016**, 2017
China (7)	1	Beijing Hanwei	**1998**
China (7)	1	PLA Hongshan	1997
China (7)	1	Zhejiang Lions	2025
Kazakhstan (7)	2	Astana Tigers	2007, 2010
Kazakhstan (7)	1	Almaty	2008
Kazakhstan (7)	1	Astana	2017
Kazakhstan (7)	1	Barsy Atyrau	2016
Kazakhstan (7)	1	CSKA Almaty	1999
Kazakhstan (7)	1	Kapchagay	2013
Kazakhstan (7)	1	Tobol Kostanay	2005
Malaysia (7)	10	Petronas	1995, 1996, 1997, 1998, 1999, 2000, 2001, 2002, 2003, 2004
Malaysia (7)	2	Kuala Lumpur Dragons	2011, 2016
Malaysia (7)	2	PKN Selangor	1981, 1984
Malaysia (7)	1	Good Will	1990
Malaysia (7)	1	Johor Tigers	1992
Malaysia (7)	1	NS Matrix Deers	2024
Malaysia (7)	1	Pandan Jaya	1988
Chinese Taipei (6)	2	Pauian	2016, 2018
Chinese Taipei (6)	1	Dacin Tigers	2017
Chinese Taipei (6)	1	Fubon Braves	2019
Chinese Taipei (6)	1	Hong Fu Rams	1995
Chinese Taipei (6)	1	Kuang Hua	1984
Chinese Taipei (6)	1	Taoyuan Pauian Pilots	2025
Indonesia (6)	4	ASPAC (Note: Played as "ASPAC Texmaco" (2001).)	1996, 1997, 2001, 2003
Indonesia (6)	2	Satria Muda Pertamina (Note: Played as "Mahaka" (2000).)	2000, 2009
Indonesia (6)	1	Asaba	1988
Indonesia (6)	1	Muba Hang Tuah	2008
Indonesia (6)	1	Panasia Indosyntec	1998
Indonesia (6)	1	Pelita Jaya	2024
Singapore (6)	2	Asia Electric	1984, 1992
Singapore (6)	1	Armed Force	1988
Singapore (6)	1	Halim	1990
Singapore (6)	1	SIA	1981
Singapore (6)	1	Sin Kee	1995
Singapore (6)	1	Tong Whye	1997
Hong Kong (5)	2	Regal	**1997**, 1998
Hong Kong (5)	2	Seasonal	1990, 1992
Hong Kong (5)	2	Winling	2001, 2002
Hong Kong (5)	1	Kwan On	1981
Hong Kong (5)	1	South China	1984
Thailand (5)	2	Mono Vampire	2017, 2018
Thailand (5)	1	Bangkok Bank	1984
Thailand (5)	1	Bangkok Club	1998
Thailand (5)	1	Hi-Tech	2019
Thailand (5)	1	Thai Ruamsin	1992
Bahrain (4)	4	Al Muharraq	2003, 2007, 2008, 2019
Bahrain (4)	4	Manama	2000, 2001, 2002, 2004
Bahrain (4)	1	Al Ahli Manama	1984
Bahrain (4)	1	Al Hala	2013
Jordan (4)	4	Zain (Note: Played as "Fastlink" (2005, 2006).)	2005, **2006**, 2008, 2009
Jordan (4)	3	ASU	2010, 2011, 2013
Jordan (4)	3	Orthodox	1988, 1996, 1999
Jordan (4)	1	Al-Ahli Amman	1995
Syria (4)	5	Al Wahda	2000, 2001, 2002, **2003**, 2004
Syria (4)	4	Jalaa	2006, 2007, 2010, 2011
Syria (4)	2	Al Jaish	2005, 2013
Syria (4)	1	Al Shorta	2016
United Arab Emirates (4)	6	Shabab Al Ahli (Note: Includes participations of Al Ahli and Al Shabab, which merged to form Shabab Al Ahli in 2017.)	2001, 2011, 2016, 2017, 2024, 2025
United Arab Emirates (4)	2	Al Wasl	2008, 2009
United Arab Emirates (4)	2	Sharjah	2004, 2005
United Arab Emirates (4)	1	Al Nasr Dubai	2010
India (3)	6	Young Cagers	2003, 2004, 2005, 2006, 2007, 2009
India (3)	4	ONGC	2008, 2013, 2016, 2017
India (3)	2	Punjab Police	1995, ~~1996~~, 2002
Kuwait (3)	6	Al-Qadsia	1984, 2000, 2001, 2006, 2008, 2009
Kuwait (3)	2	Kazma	1990, 1992
Kuwait (3)	2	Kuwait Club	2004, 2005
Lebanon (3)	12	Al Riyadi	1998, 2008, 2009, 2010, **2011**, 2012, 2016, **2017**, 2018, 2019, **2024**, 2025
Lebanon (3)	7	Sagesse	**1999**, **2000**, 2001, 2002, **2004**, 2005, 2006
Lebanon (3)	1	Blue Stars	2007
Saudi Arabia (3)	7	Al-Ittihad Jeddah	1999, 2000, **2001**, 2002, 2003, 2006, 2011
Saudi Arabia (3)	1	Al Hilal	~~1996~~, 2010
Saudi Arabia (3)	1	Ohud Medina	1981
Mongolia (2)	1	Energy Resources Falcons	2012
Mongolia (2)	1	Ulaanbaatar Xac Broncos	2025
Qatar (2)	13	Al Rayyan	2000, 2001, **2002**, 2003, 2004, **2005**, 2006, 2007, 2008, 2010, 2011, 2013, 2016
Qatar (2)	2	Al Arabi	1984, 2009
Brunei (1)	1	Brunei	1984
Iraq (1)	4	Duhok	2010, 2011, 2012, 2013
Macau (1)	1	G. D. Wa Seng	1984
Palestine (1)	1	Sareyyet Ramallah	2017
Sri Lanka (1)	1	Colombo	1984
Turkmenistan (1)	1	Belent	2012
Uzbekistan (1)	2	MHSK Tashkent	1997, 1998

== Players ==
=== Individual records ===
Most points by a player in a single game

- 50 by Sam Young, Al-Ahli Dubai (vs. Barsy Atyrau) on October 8, 2016, in the 2016 tournament

Most points scored in a game by a team

- 127 points by Al Riyadi (vs. Mono Vampire) in 2017 tournament
