= 2022 FIBA Asia Champions Cup =

- Dates: 26 September – 1 October 2022 (cancelled)

Seasons
- ← 2019 2024 →

The 2022 FIBA Asia Champions Cup was a cancelled international basketball club tournament of FIBA Asia. The competition would have been the 29th season of the FIBA Asia Champions Cup, and cancelled for the third consecutive year due to the COVID-19 pandemic. The competition would have taken place in Dubai, United Arab Emirates from 26 September to 1 October. The league would have featured 8 teams.

The competition has been cancelled due to COVID-19 pandemic.

== Qualification ==
The league champions of the Chinese Basketball Association (CBA), Korean Basketball League (KBL), Philippine Basketball Association (PBA) and B.League qualify directly for the group stage. The four other teams would have qualified through the Sub-Zone Qualifiers.

=== Team allocation ===
- 1st, 2nd, etc.: Place in the domestic competition
- TH: Title holder
- CW: Cup winner
- QT: National qualification tournament

Group phase
| (China) Liaoning Flying Leopards (1st) | (Japan) Utsunomiya Brex (1st) | (Philippines) Unknown (Note: The Philippine Basketball Association has three conferences or tournaments within a single season. It was uncertain which conference would have been used to determine the qualifying Philippine team) | (South Korea) Seoul SK Knights (1st) |
Qualifying rounds
Four other teams

== Teams ==
The following teams had qualified for the 2022 FIBA Asia CC:

| Team | Qualified on | Qualified as | Previous appearances | Best performance |
|---|---|---|---|---|
| (China) Liaoning Flying Leopards | 26 April 2022 | Champions of the 2021–22 CBA season | 1988, 1990, 1992, 1995, 1998, 2018 | Winner (1990) |
| (South Korea) Seoul SK Knights | 5 May 2022 | Champions of the 2021–22 KBL season | 2018 | Third place (2018) |
| (Japan) Utsunomiya Brex | 29 May 2022 | Champions of the 2021–22 B.League season | Debut | |
