= 2024 Basketball Champions League Asia =

29th edition of Basketball Champions League Asia

29th Basketball Champions League Asia دوري أبطال كرة السلة آسيا ٢٠٢٤

Tournament details
- Host country: United Arab Emirates
- City: Dubai
- Dates: 9–15 June
- Teams: 8
- Venue: 1

Final positions
- Champions: (Lebanon) Al Riyadi (3rd title)
- Runners-up: (United Arab Emirates) Shabab Al Ahli
- Third place: (Japan) Hiroshima Dragonflies
- Fourth place: (Iran) Shahrdari Gorgan

Tournament statistics
- Games played: 16
- MVP: Wael Arakji (Al Riyadi)
- Top scorer: James Dickey (Pelita Jaya) (25.7 ppg)
- Top rebounds: James Dickey (Pelita Jaya) (20.0 rpg)
- Top assists: Wael Arakji (Al Riyadi Beirut) (8.4 apg)

Official website
- 2024 Basketball Champions League Asia

The 2024 Basketball Champions League Asia was the first edition of the Basketball Champions League Asia, and the 29th season of the continent's top club competition. The tournament was previously known as the FIBA Asia Champions Cup, and was last held in 2019. The main tournament was scheduled to take place in Dubai in the United Arab Emirates. It was co-organized by the UAE Basketball Association and Shabab Al Ahli Club.

The tournament was held at Sheikh Saeed Bin Maktoum Sports Hall. Al Riyadi of Lebanon won their third title and they earned the right to play in the 2024 FIBA Intercontinental Cup.

== Qualification ==
The inaugural BCL Asia tournament features the top eight clubs from across the continent. Originally, champions from Japan (B. League), South Korea (KBL), China (CBA League), and the Philippines (PBA) were set for automatic qualification. However, due to a busy schedule following their co-hosting of the 2023 FIBA Basketball World Cup, the Philippine Basketball Association opted out. Their slot was filled by the tournament host, Shabab Al Ahly.

To complete the eight-team field, two teams from East and Southeast Asia punched their tickets to the BCL Asia tournament through the qualifiers, with Pelita Jaya and NS Matrix Deers emerging victorious. Meanwhile, the champions, Al Riyadi, and third-place finishers, Shahrdari Gorgan, from the 2023–24 FIBA West Asia Super League completed the lineup.

The following teams qualified to the main tournament. Years in bold denote the team won the competition.

Team	Qualified on	Qualified as	Participations
(Indonesia) Pelita Jaya	24 April 2024	First and second-placed teams of Round 2 of the qualifying rounds	Debut
(Malaysia) NS Matrix Deers	26 April 2024	First and second-placed teams of Round 2 of the qualifying rounds	Debut
(South Korea) Busan KCC Egis	5 May 2024	Winners of the 2023–24 KBL season	1 (1998) (Note: Includes participations as "Hyundai Dynat".)
(China) Liaoning Flying Leopards	22 May 2024	Winners of the 2023–24 CBA season	6 (1988, **1990**, 1992, 1995, 1999, 2018) (Note: Includes participations as "Liaoning Hunters".)
(Japan) Hiroshima Dragonflies	28 May 2024	Winners of the 2023–24 B1 League season	Debut
(United Arab Emirates) Shabab Al Ahli	30 May 2024	Hosts	4 (2001, 2011, 2016, 2017) (Note: Includes participations of Al Ahli and Al Shabab, which merged to form Shabab Al Ahli in 2017.)
(Lebanon) Al Riyadi	1 June 2024	Champions of the 2023–24 FIBA West Asia Super League	10 (1998, 2008, 2009, 2010, **2011**, 2012, 2016, **2017**, 2018, 2019)
(Iran) Shahrdari Gorgan	1 June 2024	Third-Place in the 2023–24 FIBA West Asia Super League	Debut

== Format ==
The eight teams play in two round-of-robin groups of four, with each playing three games. The top two teams advance to the final phase, where they play single-elimination games for final classification.

== Draw ==
The draw was held on 31 May 2024 in the Dubai Sports Council.

Pot 1 Team (China) Liaoning Flying Leopards (South Korea) Busan KCC Egis (Japan) Hiroshima Dragonflies	Pot 2 Team (Indonesia) Pelita Jaya (Malaysia) NS Matrix Deers	Pot 3 Team (Lebanon) Al Riyadi Beirut (Iran) Shahrdari Gorgan

== Group stage ==
All times are local (UTC+04:00)

=== Group A ===
Pos	Team	Pld	W	L	GF	GA	GD	Pts	Qualification
1	(Lebanon) Al Riyadi	3	3	0	328	251	+77	6	Semi-finals
2	(United Arab Emirates) Shabab Al Ahli	3	2	1	277	243	+34	5	Semi-finals
3	(China) Liaoning Flying Leopards	3	1	2	234	308	−74	4	
4	(Malaysia) NS Matrix Deers	3	0	3	257	294	−37	3	

Source: FIBA
Rules for classification: 1) Tournament points; 2) Head-to-head results; 3) Head-to-head points difference; 4) Head-to-head points scored; 5) Overall points difference 6) Overall points scored; 7) Random draw

9 June
18:30

Boxscore

Liaoning Flying Leopards (China)	75–118	(Lebanon) Al Riyadi
Scoring by quarter: 20–37, 12–28, 19–35, 24–18
Pts: Liu 21; Rebs: Zhang C. 8 Asts: Yan 5		Pts: Kikanović 27; Rebs: Gyokchyan 11; Asts: Lofton 9

Sheikh Saeed Bin Maktoum Sports Hall, Dubai
Attendance: 567

10 June
21:30

Boxscore

Shabab Al Ahli (United Arab Emirates)	92–76	(Malaysia) NS Matrix Deers
Scoring by quarter: 25–23, 26–12, 18–17, 23–24
Pts: Georges-Hunt 24; Rebs: Thibodeaux 12; Asts: Georges-Hunt 4		Pts: Murry 20; Rebs: Zimmerman 8 Asts: Zimmerman, Tolbert 4

Sheikh Saeed Bin Maktoum Sports Hall, Dubai
Attendance: 134

11 June
18:30

Boxscore

NS Matrix Deers (Malaysia)	93–94	(China) Liaoning Flying Leopards
Scoring by quarter: 31–28, 17–17, 28–22, 17–27
Pts: Murry 35; Rebs: Tolbert, Chun 9 Asts: Murry 4		Pts: Rice 30; Rebs: Zhang C. 11; Asts: Rice 4

Sheikh Saeed Bin Maktoum Sports Hall, Dubai
Attendance: 200

11 June
21:30

Boxscore

Al Riyadi (Lebanon)	102–88	(United Arab Emirates) Shabab Al Ahli
Scoring by quarter: 22–29, 29–20, 23–12, 28–27
Pts: Arakji 26; Rebs: Maker 6 Asts: Arakji 7		Pts: Thibodeaux 23; Rebs: Thibodeaux 12; Asts: Alajmani 12

Sheikh Saeed Bin Maktoum Sports Hall, Dubai
Attendance: 456

12 June
18:30

Boxscore

Liaoning Flying Leopards (China)	65–97	(United Arab Emirates) Shabab Al Ahli
Scoring by quarter: 15–26, 16–23, 15–24, 19–24
Pts: Cong 16; Rebs: Zhang C. 12; Asts: Li 3		Pts: Al-Shabebi 25; Rebs: Al-Shabebi 14; Asts: Thibodeaux 8

Sheikh Saeed Bin Maktoum Sports Hall, Dubai
Attendance: 225

12 June
21:30

Boxscore

NS Matrix Deers (Malaysia)	88–108	(Lebanon) Al Riyadi
Scoring by quarter: 12–41, 25–21, 23–20, 28–26
Pts: Murry 21; Rebs: Murry, Tolbert 11; Asts: Murry 6		Pts: Lofton 26; Rebs: Gyokchyan 9 Asts: Zeinoun 10

Sheikh Saeed Bin Maktoum Sports Hall, Dubai
Attendance: 367

=== Group B ===
Pos	Team	Pld	W	L	GF	GA	GD	Pts	Qualification
1	(Iran) Shahrdari Gorgan	3	2	1	286	257	+29	5 (Note: Head-to-head points difference: Shahrdari Gorgan +6, Hiroshima Dragonflies +4, Pelita Jaya -10)	Semi-finals
2	(Japan) Hiroshima Dragonflies	3	2	1	274	240	+34	5	Semi-finals
3	(Indonesia) Pelita Jaya	3	2	1	264	267	−3	5	
4	(South Korea) Busan KCC Egis	3	0	3	247	307	−60	3	

Source: FIBA
Rules for classification: 1) Tournament points; 2) Head-to-head results; 3) Head-to-head points difference; 4) Head-to-head points scored; 5) Overall points difference 6) Overall points scored; 7) Random draw
Notes:

9 June
12:30

Boxscore

Hiroshima Dragonflies (Japan)	86–69	(Indonesia) Pelita Jaya
Scoring by quarter: 26–14, 22–15, 24–16, 14–24
Pts: Kamisawa 20; Rebs: Evans 13; Asts: Blackshear 7		Pts: Brownlee 12; Rebs: Dickey 9 Asts: Dickey, Saudale 3

Sheikh Saeed Bin Maktoum Sports Hall, Dubai
Attendance: 23

9 June
15:30

Boxscore

Shahrdari Gorgan (Iran)	102–79	(South Korea) Busan KCC Egis
Scoring by quarter: 24–20, 22–14, 28–24, 28–21
Pts: Young 33; Rebs: Kazemi 10; Asts: Kazemi 7		Pts: Heo 18; Rebs: McKinne, Thompson 5 Asts: Choi 7

Sheikh Saeed Bin Maktoum Sports Hall, Dubai
Attendance: 225

10 June
15:30

Boxscore

Busan KCC Egis (South Korea)	77–107	(Japan) Hiroshima Dragonflies
Scoring by quarter: 17–33, 15–21, 22–26, 23–27
Pts: Lee G.H 22; Rebs: Thompson 8 Asts: Choi, Lee H.H. 3		Pts: Evans 24; Rebs: Kawata 9 Asts: Evans 4

Sheikh Saeed Bin Maktoum Sports Hall, Dubai
Attendance: 200

10 June
18:30

Boxscore

Pelita Jaya (Indonesia)	97–90	(Iran) Shahrdari Gorgan
Scoring by quarter: 23–24, 27–21, 20–21, 27–24
Pts: Dickey 40; Rebs: Dickey 17; Asts: Dickey 5		Pts: Cherry 24; Rebs: Monji 15; Asts: Vahedi, Sheikhi 4

Sheikh Saeed Bin Maktoum Sports Hall, Dubai
Attendance: 555

11 June
15:30

Boxscore

Hiroshima Dragonflies (Japan)	81–94	(Iran) Shahrdari Gorgan
Scoring by quarter: 23–17, 23–28, 20–29, 15–20
Pts: Evans 29; Rebs: three players 8 Asts: three players 3		Pts: Young 34; Rebs: Kazemi 9 Asts: Young, Sheikhi 4

Sheikh Saeed Bin Maktoum Sports Hall, Dubai
Attendance: 500

12 June
15:30

Boxscore

Busan KCC Egis (South Korea)	91–98	(Indonesia) Pelita Jaya
Scoring by quarter: 16–38, 30–21, 29–15, 16–24
Pts: Choi, Thompson 21; Rebs: Thompson 16; Asts: Lee H.H. 6		Pts: Dickey 26; Rebs: Dickey 26; Asts: Brownlee 5

Sheikh Saeed Bin Maktoum Sports Hall, Dubai
Attendance: 500

== Final round ==
Semifinals
14 June
(Lebanon) Al Riyadi	121
(Japan) Hiroshima Dragonflies	89
14 June
(Iran) Shahrdari Gorgan	71
(United Arab Emirates) Shabab Al Ahli	73

Final
15 June
(Lebanon) Al Riyadi	122
(United Arab Emirates) Shabab Al Ahli	96
Third place game
15 June
(Japan) Hiroshima Dragonflies	81
(Iran) Shahrdari Gorgan	76

=== Semi-finals ===
14 June
15:30

Boxscore

Shahrdari Gorgan (Iran)	71–73	(United Arab Emirates) Shabab Al Ahli
Scoring by quarter: 18–18, 22–20, 14–15, 17–20
Pts: Vahedi 24; Rebs: Kazemi 15; Asts: Kazemi 4		Pts: Al-Shabebi 20; Rebs: Georges-Hunt, Thibodeaux 9 Asts: Georges-Hunt, Pointer 5

Sheikh Saeed Bin Maktoum Sports Hall, Dubai
Attendance: 500

14 June
18:30

Boxscore

Al Riyadi (Lebanon)	121–89	(Japan) Hiroshima Dragonflies
Scoring by quarter: 35–25, 34–19, 27–26, 25–19
Pts: Gyokchyan 20; Rebs: Gyokchyan 8 Asts: Arakji 14		Pts: Blackshear 29; Rebs: Kawata 5 Asts: Evans 5

Sheikh Saeed Bin Maktoum Sports Hall, Dubai
Attendance: 500

=== Third-place game ===
15 June
15:30

Boxscore

Hiroshima Dragonflies (Japan)	81–76	(Iran) Shahrdari Gorgan
Scoring by quarter: 29–20, 14–22, 21–14, 17–20
Pts: Yamazaki 18; Rebs: Blackshear, Evans 9 Asts: Evans 7		Pts: Vahedi 21; Rebs: Kazemi 10; Asts: Kazemi, Cherry 4

Sheikh Saeed Bin Maktoum Sports Hall, Dubai
Attendance: 178
Referees: NOUJAIM Rabah (LBN), YUEN Chun Yip (HKG), ZHANG Xiao (CHN)

=== Final ===
15 June
18:30

Boxscore

Al Riyadi (Lebanon)	122–96	(United Arab Emirates) Shabab Al Ahli
Scoring by quarter: 23–21, 34–27, 44–16, 21–32
Pts: Arakji 31; Rebs: Maker 13; Asts: Arakji 9		Pts: Pointer 25; Rebs: Pointer 7 Asts: Pointer 9

Sheikh Saeed Bin Maktoum Sports Hall, Dubai
Attendance: 1,678
Referees: Takaki Kato (JPN), Yevgeniy Mikheyev (KAZ), Wissam Zein (SYR)

== Final ranking ==
Rank	Team	Record	Qualification
1st place, gold medalist(s)	(Lebanon) Al Riyadi	5–0	Qualified for the 2024 FIBA Intercontinental Cup
2nd place, silver medalist(s)	(United Arab Emirates) Shabab Al Ahli	3–2	
3rd place, bronze medalist(s)	(Japan) Hiroshima Dragonflies	3–2	
4th	(Iran) Shahrdari Gorgan	2–3	

== Statistics ==
=== Individual statistic leaders ===
Category	Player	Team(s)	Statistic
Points per game	James Dickey	Pelita Jaya	25.7
Rebounds per game	James Dickey	Pelita Jaya	14.3
Assists per game	Wael Arakji	Al Riyadi	8.4
Steals per game	Rayvonte Rice	Liaoning Flying Leopards	2.7
Blocks per game	Thon Maker	Al Riyadi	2.2
Minutes per game	James Dickey	Pelita Jaya	35.7
FG%	Wael Arakji	Al Riyadi	75.5%
3P%	Wael Arakji	Al Riyadi	71.4%
FT%	Kerry Blackshear Jr.	Hiroshima Dragonflies	96.8%

=== Individual game highs ===
Category	Player	Team	Statistic
Points	James Dickey	Pelita Jaya	40
Rebounds	James Dickey	Pelita Jaya	26
Assists	Wael Arakji	Al Riyadi	14
Steals	John Murry	NS Matrix Deers	6
Steals	Sina Vahedi	Shahrdari Gorgan	6
Blocks	Thon Maker	Al Riyadi	4
Blocks	Yanyu Liu	Liaoning Flying Leopards	4
Three pointers	seven players		6

== Awards ==
2024 Basketball Champions League Asia

Al Riyadi
3rd title

Most Valuable Player
(Lebanon) Wael Arakji

=== All-Star Five ===
Pos	Player	Club
G	(Lebanon) Wael Arakji (MVP)	(Lebanon) Al Riyadi
G	(Iran) Sina Vahedi	(Iran) Shahrdari Gorgan
C	(United States) Travin Thibodeaux	(United Arab Emirates) Shabab Al Ahli
F	(United States) Marcus Georges-Hunt	(United Arab Emirates) Shabab Al Ahli
F	(Australia) Thon Maker	(Lebanon) Al Riyadi
