= Basketball Champions League Asia =

Basketball league

- Organising body: FIBA Asia
- Founded: 1981; 45 years ago as Asia Champions Cup; 2024; 2 years ago as Champions League Asia
- First season: 1981
- Region: Asia
- Number of teams: 8
- Promotion to: FIBA Intercontinental Cup
- Current champions: (Japan) Utsunomiya Brex (1st title) (2025)
- Most championships: (Lebanon) Al Riyadi (Lebanon) Sagesse (3 titles each)
- 2027 Basketball Champions League Asia – East

The Basketball Champions League Asia (BCL Asia) is an annual continental club men's basketball competition organised by FIBA Asia. It is the highest level club competition for basketball in Asia.

Introduced in 1981 as the Asian Basketball Club Championship, the competition rebranded in 2004 to the FIBA Asia Champions Cup, and lasted until 2019. In 2024, the tournament was relaunched as the Basketball Champions League Asia.

== History ==
=== Earlier iterations (1981–2019) ===
The Asia Champions Cup was organised by the Asian Basketball Confederation in 1981, when the inaugural tournament was hosted in Hong Kong. The first-ever champions were the Bayi Rockets from China. In 1995, the name of the competition was changed to the ABC Champions Cup. After the ABC became integrated in FIBA in 2004, the competition was rebranded as the FIBA Asia Champions Cup.

In the 1990s, FIBA announced plans to expand the Intercontinental Cup with the teams from the BCL Asia, Basketball Africa League (BAL), NBL, and the NBA, at some point in the future.

Al Riyadi Club Beirut and Sagesse from Lebanon are the most successful clubs in the history of the competition, having won three titles each. Clubs from Lebanon and Iran have the most combined titles, with a total of six each.

=== BCL Asia era (2024–present) ===
In 2024, it was announced that the tournament will be renamed as the Basketball Champions League Asia, a name in line with other continental competitions in the Americas and Europe. The 2024 edition was the 29th top-tier club competition in Asia following a 5-year hiatus.

In 2025, the BCL Asia qualifying rounds renamed as BCL Asia – East.

In 2026, the top performing East Asia Super League (EASL) teams representing B.League, Korean Basketball League and the Philippine Basketball Association will secure direct qualification to BCL Asia. On July 21, the FIBA modified the qualification structure for BCL Asia. The best-ranked EASL teams from Japan and Korea, and the best-ranked EASL team overall excluding teams from Japan and Korea would secure direct qualification to BCL Asia.

The winner of the competition gets a spot in the annual FIBA Intercontinental Cup tournament.

== Qualification ==
As of the 2026 season, teams can qualify for the BCL Asia directly through the national league, the East Asia Super League, West Asia Super League or the Basketball Champions League Asia – East (BCL Asia – East).

Allocated spots in the Basketball Champions League Asia
Method	Scope	League
Direct qualification	China	Chinese Basketball Association
East Asia Super League	Japan	B.League
East Asia Super League	South Korea	Korean Basketball League
East Asia Super League	Chinese Taipei; Hong Kong; Macau; Mongolia; Philippines	Best-ranked team overall
West Asia Super League	Central, South, West Asia and Gulf	West Asia Super League champion
West Asia Super League	Central, South, West Asia and Gulf	West Asia Super League runner-up
BCL Asia – East	East and Southeast Asia	BCL Asia – East champion
BCL Asia – East	East and Southeast Asia	BCL Asia – East runner-up

== Format ==
The nine teams play in three round-of-robin groups of three, with each playing two games. The top eight teams from overall group phase advance to the final phase, where they play single-elimination games for final classification.

== Summary ==
It includes all top-tier competitions since 1981.

=== Results ===
==== Asian Basketball Club Championship / ABC Champions Cup / FIBA Asia Champions Cup (1981–2019) ====
Ed.	Year	Host	Final			Third place game		
Ed.	Year	Host	Champion	Score	Runner-up	Third	Score	Fourth
1	1981	Hong Kong	(China); Bayi Rockets	No playoffs	(Japan); Nippon Kokan	(Philippines); Apcor	No playoffs	(South Korea); Industry Bank
2	1984	(Malaysia); Ipoh	(Philippines); Northern Cement	82–56	(China); Bayi Rockets	(Chinese Taipei); Kuang Hua	82–68	(Malaysia); PKN Selangor
3	1988	(Indonesia); Jakarta	(Philippines); Swift-PABL	84–69	(China); Liaoning Hunters	(South Korea); Samsung Electronics	88–66	(Malaysia); Pandan Jaya
4	1990	(Indonesia); Jakarta	(China); Liaoning Hunters	No playoffs	(South Korea); Bank of Korea	(Kuwait); Kazma	No playoffs	(Iran); Shahrdari Isfahan
5	1992	(Thailand); Bangkok	(South Korea); Kia Motors	No playoffs	(China); Liaoning Hunters	(Kuwait); Kazma	No playoffs	(Thailand); Thai Ruamsin
6	1995	(Malaysia); Kuala Lumpur	(Philippines); Andok's	101–82	(Malaysia); Petronas	(South Korea); Kia Motors	No data	(Jordan); Al-Ahli
7	1996	(Philippines); Manila	(Philippines); Hapee Toothpaste	77–74	(Japan); Isuzu Lynx	(China); Guangdong Winnerway	80–64	(Malaysia); Petronas
8	1997	(Indonesia); Jakarta	(Hong Kong); Regal	64–59	(South Korea); Kia Motors	(Indonesia); Aspac	78–52	(Japan); Isuzu Giga Cats
9	1998	(Malaysia); Kuala Lumpur	(China); Beijing Hanwei	71–70	(Hong Kong); Regal	(Lebanon); Al-Riyadi	87–77	(South Korea); Hyundai Dynat
10	1999	(Lebanon); Beirut	(Lebanon); Sagesse	84–71	(China); Liaoning Hunters	(Malaysia); Petronas	58–55	(Saudi Arabia); Al-Ittihad
11	2000	(Lebanon); Beirut	(Lebanon); Sagesse	55–52	(Saudi Arabia); Al-Ittihad	(Bahrain); Al-Manama	92–69	(Kuwait); Al-Qadsia
12	2001	(United Arab Emirates); Dubai	(Saudi Arabia); Al-Ittihad	103–101 (OT)	(Qatar); Al-Rayyan	(Syria); Al-Wahda	93–79	(Hong Kong); Winling
13	2002	(Malaysia); Kuala Lumpur	(Qatar); Al-Rayyan	92–78	(Saudi Arabia); Al-Ittihad	(Syria); Al-Wahda	104–63	(South Korea); Sangmu
14	2003	(Malaysia); Kuala Lumpur	(Syria); Al-Wahda	96–63	(Qatar); Al-Rayyan	(South Korea); Sangmu Phoenix	91–82	(Saudi Arabia); Al-Ittihad
15	2004	(United Arab Emirates); Sharjah	(Lebanon); Sagesse	72–70	(Syria); Al-Wahda	(Qatar); Al-Rayyan	82–80	(South Korea); Sangmu Phoenix
16	2005	(Philippines); Quezon City	(Qatar); Al-Rayyan	83–76	(Jordan); Fastlink	(Lebanon); Sagesse	74–71	(Iran); Saba Battery Tehran
17	2006	Kuwait City	(Jordan); Fastlink	94–69	(Syria); Al-Jalaa Aleppo	(Qatar); Al-Rayyan	102–64	(Saudi Arabia); Al-Ittihad
18	2007	(Iran); Tehran	(Iran); Saba Battery Tehran	83–75	(Syria); Al-Jalaa Aleppo	(Qatar); Al-Rayyan	95–75	(Philippines); San Miguel-Magnolia
19	2008	Kuwait City	(Iran); Saba Battery Tehran	82–75	(Jordan); Zain	(United Arab Emirates); Al-Wasl	95–75	(Lebanon); Al-Riyadi Beirut
20	2009	(Indonesia); Jakarta	(Iran); Mahram Tehran	78–68	(Qatar); Al-Rayyan	(Lebanon); Al-Riyadi	94–81	(Qatar); Al-Arabi
21	2010	(Qatar); Doha	(Iran); Mahram Tehran	93–73	(Qatar); Al-Rayyan	(Lebanon); Al-Riyadi	82–78 (OT)	(Jordan); ASU
22	2011	(Philippines); Pasig	(Lebanon); Al Riyadi	91–82	(Iran); Mahram Tehran	(Qatar); Al-Rayyan	71–64	(Philippines); Smart Gilas
23	2012	(Lebanon); Beirut	No title awarded (Note: The championship game were called off due to security issues in Beirut. Therefore, the finalist Al-Riyadi and Mahram Tehran were declared as co-runners-up.)		(Lebanon) Al-Riyadi (Iran) Mahram Tehran	(Iraq); Duhok	73–58	(Turkmenistan); Belent Ashgabat
24	2013	(Jordan); Amman	(Iran); Foolad Mahan Isfahan	84–74	(Qatar); Al-Rayyan	(Jordan); ASU	107–76	(Bahrain); Al-Hala
25	2016	(China); Chenzhou	China Kashgar	96–88	(Lebanon); Al-Riyadi	(Iran); Petrochimi	100–74	(United Arab Emirates); Al-Ahli
26	2017	(China); Chenzhou	(Lebanon); Al Riyadi	88–59	China Kashgar	(Kazakhstan); BC Astana	81–78	(Iran); Petrochimi
27	2018	(Thailand); Nonthaburi	(Iran); Petrochimi Bandar Imam	68–64	(Japan); Alvark Tokyo	(South Korea); Seoul SK Knights	91–87	(Philippines); Meralco Bolts
28	2019	(Thailand); Nonthaburi	(Japan); Alvark Tokyo	98–74	(Lebanon); Al-Riyadi	(Iran); Palayesh Naft Abadan	81–69	(Bahrain); Al-Muharraq
—	2020	(China); Guangzhou	Cancelled due to COVID-19 pandemic in Asia.					
—	2022	(United Arab Emirates); Dubai	Cancelled due to COVID-19 pandemic in Asia.					

==== Basketball Champions League Asia ====
Ed.	Year	Host	Final			Third place game		
Ed.	Year	Host	Champion	Score	Runner-up	Third	Score	Fourth
1	2024	(United Arab Emirates); Dubai	(Lebanon); Al Riyadi	122–96	(United Arab Emirates); Shabab Al Ahli	(Japan); Hiroshima Dragonflies	81–76	(Iran); Shahrdari Gorgan
2	2025	(United Arab Emirates); Dubai	(Japan); Utsunomiya Brex	94–93	(Lebanon); Al Riyadi	(Mongolia); Ulaanbaatar Xac Broncos	84–79	(United Arab Emirates); Shabab Al Ahli
—	2026		Cancelled					

=== Records and statistics ===
It includes all top-tier competitions since 1981.

Performances in the Basketball Champions League Asia by club
Club	Titles	Runners-up	Years won	Years runners-up
(Lebanon) Al Riyadi	3	4	2011, 2017, 2024	2012, 2016, 2019, 2025
(Lebanon) Sagesse	3	0	1999, 2000, 2004	—
(Qatar) Al-Rayyan	2	5	2002, 2005	2001, 2003, 2008, 2010, 2013
(Iran) Mahram Tehran	2	2	2009, 2010	2011, 2012
(Iran) Saba Battery Tehran	2	0	2007, 2008	
(China) Liaoning Hunters	1	3	1990	1988, 1992, 1999
(Saudi Arabia) Al-Ittihad	1	2	2001	2000, 2002
(Jordan) Zain	1	2	2006	2005, 2009
(Syria) Al-Wahda	1	1	2003	2004
(South Korea) Kia Motors	1	1	1992	1997
(China) Bayi Rockets	1	1	1981	1984
(Hong Kong) Regal	1	1	1997	1998
Xinjiang Flying Tigers / China Kashgar	1	1	2016	2017
(Japan) Alvark Tokyo	1	1	2019	2018
(Iran) Petrochimi Bandar Imam	1	0	2018	—
(Philippines) Northern Cement	1	0	1984	—
(Philippines) Swift	1	0	1988	—
(Philippines) Andok's	1	0	1995	—
(Philippines) Hapee Toothpaste	1	0	1996	—
(China) Beijing Hanwei	1	0	1998	—
(Iran) Foolad Mahan Isfahan	1	0	2013	—
(Japan) Utsunomiya Brex	1	0	2025	—
(Syria) Al-Jalaa Aleppo	0	2	—	2006, 2007
(Malaysia) Petronas	0	1	—	1995
(Japan) Nippon Kokan	0	1	—	1981
(South Korea) Bank of Korea	0	1	—	1990
(Japan) Isuzu Lynx	0	1	—	1996
(United Arab Emirates) Shabab Al Ahli	0	1	—	2024

== Asia's top tier competitions ==
FIBA Asia took control in 2004.

- 1981–1994, Asian Basketball Club Championship
- 1995–2003, Asian Basketball Confederation Champions Cup (or ABC Champions Cup) (renamed)
- 2004–2022, FIBA Asia Champions Cup (renamed)
- 2024–present, Basketball Champions League Asia

== Titles by nation ==
It includes all top-tier competitions since 1981.

Rank	Nation	Gold	Silver	Bronze	Total
1	Lebanon	6	4	4	14
2	Iran	6	2	2	10
3	China	4	5	1	10
4	Philippines	4	0	1	5
5	Qatar	2	5	4	11
6	Japan	2	3	1	6
7	Syria	1	3	2	6
8	South Korea	1	2	4	7
9	Jordan	1	2	1	4
10	Saudi Arabia	1	2	0	3
11	Hong Kong	1	1	0	2
12	Malaysia	0	1	1	2
12	United Arab Emirates	0	1	1	2
14	Kuwait	0	0	2	2
15	Bahrain	0	0	1	1
15	Chinese Taipei	0	0	1	1
15	Indonesia	0	0	1	1
15	Iraq	0	0	1	1
15	Kazakhstan	0	0	1	1
15	Mongolia	0	0	1	1
Totals (20 entries)		29	31	30	90

== Awards ==
=== MVP ===
Asian Basketball Club Championship / ABC Champions Cup (1995-2003)

- 1995: (United States) Bobby Parks
- 1996: (United States) Tony Harris
- 1997: (United States) Wayman Strickland
- 1998: (United States) Michael Cumberland
- 1999: (Senegal) Assane N'Diaye
- 2000: (Lebanon) Elie Mechantaf
- 2001: (United States) Johnny Rhodes
- 2002: (United States) Kris Johnson
- 2003: (United States) Andre Pitts

FIBA Asia Champions Cup (2004-2019)

- 2004:
- 2005: (Lebanon) Fadi El Khatib
- 2006:
- 2007: (Iran) Samad Nikkhah Bahrami
- 2008: (Nigeria) Gabe Muoneke
- 2009: (United States) Jackson Vroman
- 2010:
- 2011: (Lebanon) Fadi El Khatib (2)
- 2012: not awarded
- 2013:
- 2016: (United States) Dewarick Spencer
- 2017: (United States) (Bulgaria) Darius Adams
- 2018: (Japan) Daiki Tanaka
- 2019: (United States) (Japan) Alex Kirk

Basketball Champions League Asia (2024-present)

- 2024: (Lebanon) Wael Arakji
- 2025: (United States) D.J. Newbill

== See also ==
- East Asia Super League
- FIBA West Asia Super League
- Women's Basketball League Asia
- ASEAN Basketball League
