= 2003 ABC Champions Cup =

2003 FIBA Asia Champions Cup
14th Asia Champions Cup

Tournament details
- Host country: Malaysia
- Dates: 21–27 December
- Teams: 9
- Venue(s): 1 (in 1 host city)

Final positions
- Champions: Syria (1st title)

Tournament statistics
- MVP: (United States) Andre Pitts

The ABC Champions Cup 2003 was the 14th staging of the ABC Champions Cup, the basketball club tournament of Asian Basketball Confederation. The tournament was held in Kuala Lumpur, Malaysia between December 21 to 27, 2003.

== Preliminary round ==
=== Group A ===
| Team | Pld | W | L | PF | PA | PD | Pts | Tiebreaker |
|---|---|---|---|---|---|---|---|---|
| (Qatar) Al-Rayyan | 3 | 3 | 0 | 290 | 232 | +58 | 6 | |
| (South Korea) Sangmu Phoenix | 3 | 1 | 2 | 283 | 284 | −1 | 4 | 1–1 / 1.061 |
| (Bahrain) Al-Muharraq | 3 | 1 | 2 | 245 | 265 | −20 | 4 | 1–1 / 1.017 |
| (Indonesia) ASPAC | 3 | 1 | 2 | 252 | 289 | −37 | 4 | 1–1 / 0.927 |

December 21

| Al-Rayyan (Qatar) | 96–73 | (Indonesia) ASPAC |

MABA Stadium, Kuala Lumpur

December 22

| Al-Muharraq (Bahrain) | 93–83 | (South Korea) Sangmu |

MABA Stadium, Kuala Lumpur

December 23

| Al-Muharraq (Bahrain) | 68–91 | (Qatar) Al-Rayyan |

MABA Stadium, Kuala Lumpur

December 24

| Sangmu (South Korea) | 109–88 | (Indonesia) ASPAC |

MABA Stadium, Kuala Lumpur

December 25

| ASPAC (Indonesia) | 91–84 | (Bahrain) Al-Muharraq |

MABA Stadium, Kuala Lumpur

December 25

| Al-Rayyan (Qatar) | 103–91 | (South Korea) Sangmu |

MABA Stadium, Kuala Lumpur

=== Group B ===
| Team | Pld | W | L | PF | PA | PD | Pts |
|---|---|---|---|---|---|---|---|
| (Syria) Al-Wahda | 4 | 4 | 0 | 413 | 314 | +99 | 8 |
| (Saudi Arabia) Al-Ittihad | 4 | 3 | 1 | 340 | 297 | +43 | 7 |
| (Iran) Sanam Tehran | 4 | 2 | 2 | 352 | 348 | +4 | 6 |
| (Malaysia) Petronas | 4 | 1 | 3 | 314 | 310 | +4 | 5 |
| (India) Young Cagers | 4 | 0 | 4 | 286 | 436 | −150 | 4 |

December 21

| Al-Wahda (Syria) | 90–78 | (Saudi Arabia) Al-Ittihad |

MABA Stadium, Kuala Lumpur

December 21

| Petronas (Malaysia) | 101–69 | (India) Young Cagers |

MABA Stadium, Kuala Lumpur

December 22

| Young Cagers (India) | 72–126 | (Syria) Al-Wahda |

MABA Stadium, Kuala Lumpur

December 22

| Petronas (Malaysia) | 64–78 | (Iran) Sanam |

MABA Stadium, Kuala Lumpur

December 23

| Al-Ittihad (Saudi Arabia) | 103–54 | (India) Young Cagers |

MABA Stadium, Kuala Lumpur

December 23

| Sanam (Iran) | 85–105 | (Syria) Al-Wahda |

MABA Stadium, Kuala Lumpur

December 24

| Sanam (Iran) | 83–88 | (Saudi Arabia) Al-Ittihad |

MABA Stadium, Kuala Lumpur

December 24

| Petronas (Malaysia) | 79–92 | (Syria) Al-Wahda |

MABA Stadium, Kuala Lumpur

December 25

| Young Cagers (India) | 91–106 | (Iran) Sanam |

MABA Stadium, Kuala Lumpur

December 25

| Al-Ittihad (Saudi Arabia) | 71–70 | (Malaysia) Petronas |

MABA Stadium, Kuala Lumpur

== Knockout round ==
Semi-finals
December 26 – Kuala Lumpur
(Qatar) Al-Rayyan | 94
(Saudi Arabia) Al-Ittihad | 88
December 26 – Kuala Lumpur
(Syria) Al-Wahda | 107
(South Korea) Sangmu | 78

Final
December 27 – Kuala Lumpur
(Qatar) Al-Rayyan | 63
(Syria) Al-Wahda | 96
Third place
December 27 – Kuala Lumpur
(Saudi Arabia) Al-Ittihad | 82
(South Korea) Sangmu | 91

=== Semifinals ===
December 26

Semis

| Al-Rayyan (Qatar) | 94–88 | (Saudi Arabia) Al-Ittihad |

MABA Stadium, Kuala Lumpur

December 26

Semis

| Al-Wahda (Syria) | 107–78 | (South Korea) Sangmu |

MABA Stadium, Kuala Lumpur

=== Finals ===
December 26

7th–8th

| ASPAC (Indonesia) | 97–84 | (Malaysia) Petronas |

MABA Stadium, Kuala Lumpur

December 27

5th–6th

| Al-Muharraq (Bahrain) | 80–86 | (Iran) Sanam |

MABA Stadium, Kuala Lumpur

December 27

Bronze

| Al-Ittihad (Saudi Arabia) | 82–91 | (South Korea) Sangmu |

MABA Stadium, Kuala Lumpur

December 27

Gold

| Al-Rayyan (Qatar) | 63–96 | (Syria) Al-Wahda |
Scoring by quarter: 21–33, 10–18, 15–19, 18–26

MABA Stadium, Kuala Lumpur

== Final standings ==
| Rank | Team | Record |
|---|---|---|
| Gold medal | (Syria) Al-Wahda | 6–0 |
| Silver medal | (Qatar) Al-Rayyan | 4–1 |
| Bronze medal | (South Korea) Sangmu Phoenix | 2–3 |
| 4th | (Saudi Arabia) Al-Ittihad | 3–3 |
| 5th | (Iran) Sanam Tehran | 3–2 |
| 6th | (Bahrain) Al-Muharraq | 1–3 |
| 7th | (Indonesia) ASPAC | 2–2 |
| 8th | (Malaysia) Petronas | 1–4 |
| 9th | (India) Young Cagers | 0–4 |

== Awards ==
- Most Valuable Player: (United States) Andre Pitts (Al-Wahda)
- Best Scorer: (United States) Andre Pitts (Al-Wahda)
- Best Three Point Shooter: (United States) Andre Pitts (Al-Wahda)
