= 2000 ABC Champions Cup =

2000 FIBA Asia Champions Cup
11th Asia Champions Cup

Tournament details
- Host country: Lebanon
- Dates: 14–21 May
- Teams: 9
- Venue: 1 (in 1 host city)

Final positions
- Champions: Lebanon (2nd title)

Tournament statistics
- MVP: (Lebanon) Elie Mechantaf

The ABC Champions Cup 2000 was the 11th staging of the ABC Champions Cup, the basketball club tournament of Asian Basketball Confederation. The tournament was held in Beirut, Lebanon between May 14 to 21, 2000. The reigning champions Sagesse from the hosts were the first team to successfully defend their title in this annual tournament.

== Preliminary round ==
=== Group A ===
| Team | Pld | W | L | PF | PA | PD | Pts |
|---|---|---|---|---|---|---|---|
| (Lebanon) Sagesse | 3 | 3 | 0 | 245 | 189 | +56 | 6 |
| (Kuwait) Al-Qadsia | 3 | 2 | 1 | 248 | 240 | +8 | 5 |
| (Syria) Al-Wahda | 3 | 1 | 2 | 198 | 219 | −21 | 4 |
| (Iran) Zob Ahan Isfahan | 3 | 0 | 3 | 190 | 233 | −43 | 3 |

May 14
14:00

| Al-Qadsia (Kuwait) | 92–72 | (Iran) Zob Ahan Isfahan |

Ghazir Club Court, Beirut

May 14
21:15

| Sagesse (Lebanon) | 77–57 | (Syria) Al-Wahda |

Ghazir Club Court, Beirut

May 15
21:15

| Zob Ahan Isfahan (Iran) | 67–73 | (Lebanon) Sagesse |

Ghazir Club Court, Beirut

May 16
18:00

| Al-Wahda (Syria) | 73–91 | (Kuwait) Al-Qadsia |

Ghazir Club Court, Beirut

May 17
20:45

| Al-Wahda (Syria) | 68–51 | (Iran) Zob Ahan Isfahan |

Ghazir Club Court, Beirut

May 18
21:15

| Al-Qadsia (Kuwait) | 65–95 | (Lebanon) Sagesse |

Ghazir Club Court, Beirut

=== Group B ===
| Team | Pld | W | L | PF | PA | PD | Pts |
|---|---|---|---|---|---|---|---|
| (Saudi Arabia) Al-Ittihad | 4 | 4 | 0 | 334 | 230 | +104 | 8 |
| (Bahrain) Al-Manama | 4 | 3 | 1 | 292 | 283 | +9 | 7 |
| (Qatar) Al-Rayyan | 4 | 2 | 2 | 323 | 282 | +41 | 6 |
| (Malaysia) Petronas | 4 | 1 | 3 | 254 | 308 | −54 | 5 |
| (Indonesia) Mahaka | 4 | 0 | 4 | 262 | 362 | −100 | 4 |

May 14
16:00

| Petronas (Malaysia) | 79–73 | (Indonesia) Mahaka |

Ghazir Club Court, Beirut

May 14
18:00

| Al-Ittihad (Saudi Arabia) | 90–54 | (Bahrain) Al-Manama |

Ghazir Club Court, Beirut

May 15
14:00

| Mahaka (Indonesia) | 64–93 | (Bahrain) Al-Manama |

Ghazir Club Court, Beirut

May 15
18:00

| Petronas (Malaysia) | 61–103 | (Qatar) Al-Rayyan |

Ghazir Club Court, Beirut

May 16
14:00

| Mahaka (Indonesia) | 57–104 | (Saudi Arabia) Al-Ittihad |

Ghazir Club Court, Beirut

May 16
20:45

| Al-Manama (Bahrain) | 80–70 | (Qatar) Al-Rayyan |

Ghazir Club Court, Beirut

May 17
14:00

| Al-Manama (Bahrain) | 65–59 | (Malaysia) Petronas |

Ghazir Club Court, Beirut

May 17
18:00

| Al-Rayyan (Qatar) | 64–73 | (Saudi Arabia) Al-Ittihad |

Ghazir Club Court, Beirut

May 18
14:00

| Al-Rayyan (Qatar) | 86–68 | (Indonesia) Mahaka |

Ghazir Club Court, Beirut

May 18
18:00

| Al-Ittihad (Saudi Arabia) | 67–55 | (Malaysia) Petronas |

Ghazir Club Court, Beirut

== Knockout round ==
Semi-finals
May 20 – Beirut
(Lebanon) Sagesse | 71
(Bahrain) Al-Manama | 65
May 20 – Beirut
(Saudi Arabia) Al-Ittihad | 95
(Kuwait) Al-Qadsia | 69

Final
May 21 – Beirut
(Lebanon) Sagesse | 55
(Saudi Arabia) Al-Ittihad | 52
Third place
May 21 – Beirut
(Bahrain) Al-Manama | 92
(Kuwait) Al-Qadsia | 69

=== Semifinals ===
May 20
18:00

Semis

| Al-Ittihad (Saudi Arabia) | 95–69 | (Kuwait) Al-Qadsia |
Scoring by half: 49–33, 46–36
| Pts: Ford 34 | | Pts: Farhan 19 |

Ghazir Club Court, Beirut

May 20
20:45

Semis

| Sagesse (Lebanon) | 71–65 | (Bahrain) Al-Manama |
Scoring by half: 38–42, 33–23
| Pts: Mechantaf 22 | | Pts: Dortch 19 |

Ghazir Club Court, Beirut

=== Finals ===
May 20
15:15

7th–8th

| Zob Ahan Isfahan (Iran) | 83–44 | (Malaysia) Petronas |
Scoring by half: 44–23, 39–21
| Pts: Emdadi 18 | | Pts: Enoch 23 |

Ghazir Club Court, Beirut

May 21
15:15

5th–6th

| Al-Wahda (Syria) | 70–84 | (Qatar) Al-Rayyan |
Scoring by half: 39–48, 31–36
| Pts: Al-Sharif 32 | | Pts: Mahmoud 35 |

Ghazir Club Court, Beirut

May 21
18:00

Bronze

| Al-Manama (Bahrain) | 92–69 | (Kuwait) Al-Qadsia |
Scoring by half: 39–38, 53–31
| Pts: Najaf 22 | | Pts: Farhan 22 |

Ghazir Club Court, Beirut

May 21
20:45

Gold

| Sagesse (Lebanon) | 55–52 | (Saudi Arabia) Al-Ittihad |
Scoring by half: 28–24, 27–28
| Pts: El Khatib 19; Rebs: N'Diaye 12; Asts: Mechantaf 3 | | Pts: Ford 20; Rebs: Al-Maghrabi 10; Asts: Ford 5 |

Ghazir Club Court, Beirut

== Final standings ==
| Rank | Team | Record |
|---|---|---|
| Gold medal | (Lebanon) Sagesse | 5–0 |
| Silver medal | (Saudi Arabia) Al-Ittihad | 5–1 |
| Bronze medal | (Bahrain) Al-Manama | 4–2 |
| 4 | (Kuwait) Al-Qadsia | 2–3 |
| 5 | (Qatar) Al-Rayyan | 3–2 |
| 6 | (Syria) Al-Wahda | 1–3 |
| 7 | (Iran) Zob Ahan Isfahan | 1–3 |
| 8 | (Malaysia) Petronas | 1–4 |
| 9 | (Indonesia) Mahaka | 0–4 |

== Awards ==
- Most Valuable Player: (Lebanon) Elie Mechantaf (Sagesse)
- Most Valuable Coach: (Lebanon) Ghassan Sarkis (Sagesse)
- Best Rebounder: (Senegal) Assane N'Diaye (Sagesse)
- Best Three Point Shooter: (United States) Sherell Ford (Al-Ittihad)
- Best Defender: (Lebanon) Mohammad Acha (Sagesse)
- Best Scorer: (United States) Sherell Ford (Sagesse)
- Best Sixth Man: (Lebanon) Bader Makki (Sagesse)
- Best Sportsmanship: (Senegal) Assane N'Diaye (Sagesse)
- Fair Play: (Bahrain) Al-Manama
