= 1999 ABC Champions Cup =

1999 FIBA Asia Champions Cup
10th Asia Champions Cup
- Official logo

Tournament details
- Host country: Lebanon
- Dates: 22–29 May
- Teams: 10
- Venue(s): 1 (in 1 host city)

Final positions
- Champions: Lebanon (1st title)

Tournament statistics
- MVP: (Senegal) Assane N'Diaye

The ABC Champions Cup 1999 was the 10th staging of the ABC Champions Cup, the basketball club tournament of Asian Basketball Confederation. The tournament was held in Beirut, Lebanon between May 22 to 29, 1999.

== Preliminary round ==
=== Group A ===
Team	Pld	W	L	PF	PA	PD	Pts
(China) Liaoning Hunters	3	3	0	270	215	+55	6
(Saudi Arabia) Al-Ittihad	3	2	1	231	201	+30	5
(Kazakhstan) SKA Almaty	3	1	2	220	241	−21	4
(Philippines) Pasig-Rizal Pirates	3	0	3	187	251	−64	3

May 22

Liaoning (China)	97–66	(Philippines) Pirates

Ghazir Club Court, Beirut

May 23

Al-Ittihad (Saudi Arabia)	69–50	(Philippines) Pirates

Ghazir Club Court, Beirut

May 24

SKA Almaty (Kazakhstan)	71–86	(China) Liaoning

Ghazir Club Court, Beirut

May 25

Al-Ittihad (Saudi Arabia)	84–64	(Kazakhstan) SKA Almaty

Ghazir Club Court, Beirut

May 26

Pirates (Philippines)	71–85	(Kazakhstan) SKA Almaty

Ghazir Club Court, Beirut

May 26

Liaoning (China)	87–78	(Saudi Arabia) Al-Ittihad

Ghazir Club Court, Beirut

=== Group B ===
Team	Pld	W	L	PF	PA	PD	Pts	Tiebreaker
(Lebanon) Sagesse	3	2	1	229	192	+37	5	1–0
(Malaysia) Petronas	3	2	1	197	210	−13	5	0–1
(Japan) JBL	3	1	2	195	211	−16	4	1–0
(Jordan) Orthodox	3	1	2	181	189	−8	4	0–1

May 22

Petronas (Malaysia)	63–53	(Japan) JBL

Ghazir Club Court, Beirut

May 22

Orthodox (Jordan)	56–49	(Lebanon) Sagesse

Ghazir Club Court, Beirut

May 23

JBL (Japan)	70–84	(Lebanon) Sagesse

Ghazir Club Court, Beirut

May 24

JBL (Japan)	72–64	(Jordan) Orthodox

Ghazir Club Court, Beirut

May 25

Sagesse (Lebanon)	96–66	(Malaysia) Petronas

Ghazir Club Court, Beirut

May 26

Orthodox (Jordan)	61–68	(Malaysia) Petronas

Ghazir Club Court, Beirut

== Knockout round ==
=== 5th–8th places ===
Semi-finals
May 28 – Beirut
(Kazakhstan) SKA Almaty	63
(Jordan) Orthodox	91
May 28 – Beirut
(Japan) JBL	60
(Philippines) Pirates	52

Fifth place
May 29 – Beirut
(Jordan) Orthodox	47
(Japan) JBL	51
Seventh place
May 29 – Beirut
(Kazakhstan) SKA Almaty	68
(Philippines) Pirates	67

=== Championship ===
Semi-finals
May 28 – Beirut
(China) Liaoning	60
(Malaysia) Petronas	59
May 28 – Beirut
(Lebanon) Sagesse	64
(Saudi Arabia) Al-Ittihad	55

Final
May 29 – Beirut
(China) Liaoning	71
(Lebanon) Sagesse	84
Third place
May 29 – Beirut
(Malaysia) Petronas	58
(Saudi Arabia) Al-Ittihad	55

=== Semifinals ===
May 28

5th–8th

SKA Almaty (Kazakhstan)	63–91	(Jordan) Orthodox

Ghazir Club Court, Beirut

May 28

5th–8th

JBL (Japan)	60–52	(Philippines) Pirates

Ghazir Club Court, Beirut

May 28

Semis

Liaoning (China)	60–59	(Malaysia) Petronas

Ghazir Club Court, Beirut

May 28

Semis

Sagesse (Lebanon)	64–55	(Saudi Arabia) Al-Ittihad

Ghazir Club Court, Beirut

=== Finals ===
May 29

7th–8th

SKA Almaty (Kazakhstan)	68–67	(Philippines) Pirates

Ghazir Club Court, Beirut

May 29

5th–6th

Orthodox (Jordan)	47–51	(Japan) JBL

Ghazir Club Court, Beirut

May 29

Bronze

Petronas (Malaysia)	58–55	(Saudi Arabia) Al-Ittihad

Ghazir Club Court, Beirut

May 29
20:45

Gold

Liaoning (China)	71–84	(Lebanon) Sagesse
Scoring by half: 41–42, 30–42
Pts: Woodard 24		Pts: El Khatib 18

Ghazir Club Court, Beirut
Attendance: 5,000

== Final standings ==
Rank	Team	Record
Gold medal	(Lebanon) Sagesse	4–1
Silver medal	(China) Liaoning Hunters	4–1
Bronze medal	(Malaysia) Petronas	3–2
4th	(Saudi Arabia) Al-Ittihad	2–3
5th	(Japan) JBL	3–2
6th	(Jordan) Orthodox	2–3
7th	(Kazakhstan) SKA Almaty	2–3
8th	(Philippines) Pasig-Rizal Pirates	0–5

== Awards ==
- Most Valuable Player: (Senegal) Assane N'Diaye (Sagesse)
- Most Valuable Coach: (Lebanon) Ghassan Sarkis (Sagesse) & (United States) Felton Sealey (Petronas)
- Best Three Point Shooter: (Lebanon) Elie Mechantaf (Sagesse)
- Best Scorer: (United States) Jason Woodard (Liaoning)
- Best Sixth Man: (Lebanon) Vicken Eskedjian (Sagesse)
- Best Sportsmanship: (Lebanon) Elie Mechantaf (Sagesse)
