= 2002 ABC Champions Cup =

2002 FIBA Asia Champions Cup
13th Asia Champions Cup
- Official logo

Tournament details
- Host country: Malaysia
- Dates: 28 April–5 May
- Teams: 10
- Venue: 1 (in 1 host city)

Final positions
- Champions: Qatar (1st title)

Tournament statistics
- MVP: (United States) Kristaan Johnson

The ABC Champions Cup 2002 was the 13th staging of the ABC Champions Cup, the basketball club tournament of Asian Basketball Confederation. The tournament was held in Kuala Lumpur, Malaysia between April 28 to May 5, 2002.

== Preliminary round ==
=== Group A ===
Team	Pld	W	L	PF	PA	PD	Pts	Tiebreaker
(Saudi Arabia) Al-Ittihad	4	4	0	407	364	+43	8	
(South Korea) Sangmu Phoenix	4	2	2	376	399	−23	6	1–0
(Lebanon) Sagesse	4	2	2	443	363	+80	6	0–1
(Philippines) Spring Cooking Oil	4	1	3	383	427	−44	5	1–0
(Hong Kong) Winling	4	1	3	362	418	−56	5	0–1

April 28

Al-Ittihad (Saudi Arabia)	100–90	(Hong Kong) Winling

MABA Stadium, Kuala Lumpur

April 28

Sangmu (South Korea)	101–96	(Philippines) Spring

MABA Stadium, Kuala Lumpur

April 29

Winling (Hong Kong)	99–77	(South Korea) Sangmu

MABA Stadium, Kuala Lumpur

April 29

Sagesse (Lebanon)	89–102	(Saudi Arabia) Al-Ittihad

MABA Stadium, Kuala Lumpur

April 30

Sangmu (South Korea)	99–97	(Lebanon) Sagesse

MABA Stadium, Kuala Lumpur

April 30

Spring (Philippines)	107–105 (OT)	(Hong Kong) Winling

MABA Stadium, Kuala Lumpur

May 1

Al-Ittihad (Saudi Arabia)	107–99	(South Korea) Sangmu

MABA Stadium, Kuala Lumpur

May 1

Sagesse (Lebanon)	123–94	(Philippines) Spring

MABA Stadium, Kuala Lumpur

May 2

Spring (Philippines)	86–98	(Saudi Arabia) Al-Ittihad

MABA Stadium, Kuala Lumpur

May 2

Winling (Hong Kong)	68–134	(Lebanon) Sagesse

MABA Stadium, Kuala Lumpur

=== Group B ===
Team	Pld	W	L	PF	PA	PD	Pts
(Qatar) Al-Rayyan	4	4	0	400	327	+73	8
(Syria) Al-Wahda	4	3	1	404	320	+84	7
(Malaysia) Petronas	4	2	2	355	347	+8	6
(Bahrain) Al-Manama	4	1	3	341	364	−23	5
(India) Punjab Police	4	0	4	319	461	−142	4

April 28

Al-Rayyan (Qatar)	94–92	(Bahrain) Al-Manama

MABA Stadium, Kuala Lumpur

April 28

Petronas (Malaysia)	117–90	(India) Punjab Police

MABA Stadium, Kuala Lumpur

April 29

Al-Manama (Bahrain)	73–87	(Malaysia) Petronas

MABA Stadium, Kuala Lumpur

April 29

Punjab Police (India)	69–133	(Syria) Al-Wahda

MABA Stadium, Kuala Lumpur

April 30

Al-Manama (Bahrain)	98–85	(India) Punjab Police

MABA Stadium, Kuala Lumpur

April 30

Al-Wahda (Syria)	87–95	(Qatar) Al-Rayyan

MABA Stadium, Kuala Lumpur

May 1

Punjab Police (India)	75–113	(Qatar) Al-Rayyan

MABA Stadium, Kuala Lumpur

May 1

Petronas (Malaysia)	78–86	(Syria) Al-Wahda

MABA Stadium, Kuala Lumpur

May 2

Al-Rayyan (Qatar)	98–73	(Malaysia) Petronas

MABA Stadium, Kuala Lumpur

May 2

Al-Wahda (Syria)	98–78	(Bahrain) Al-Manama

MABA Stadium, Kuala Lumpur

== Knockout round ==
Semi-finals
May 4 – Kuala Lumpur
(Saudi Arabia) Al-Ittihad	92
(Syria) Al-Wahda	86
May 4 – Kuala Lumpur
(Qatar) Al-Rayyan	99
(South Korea) Sangmu	70

Final
May 5 – Kuala Lumpur
(Saudi Arabia) Al-Ittihad	78
(Qatar) Al-Rayyan	92
Third place
May 5 – Kuala Lumpur
(Syria) Al-Wahda	104
(South Korea) Sangmu	63

=== Semifinals ===
May 4

Semis

Al-Ittihad (Saudi Arabia)	92–86	(Syria) Al-Wahda

MABA Stadium, Kuala Lumpur

May 4

Semis

Al-Rayyan (Qatar)	99–70	(South Korea) Sangmu

MABA Stadium, Kuala Lumpur

=== Finals ===
May 4

9th–10th

Winling (Hong Kong)	86–67	(India) Punjab Police

MABA Stadium, Kuala Lumpur

May 4

7th–8th

Spring (Philippines)	95–75	(Bahrain) Al-Manama

MABA Stadium, Kuala Lumpur

May 5

5th–6th

Sagesse (Lebanon)	119–110	(Malaysia) Petronas

MABA Stadium, Kuala Lumpur

May 5

Bronze

Al-Wahda (Syria)	104–63	(South Korea) Sangmu

MABA Stadium, Kuala Lumpur

May 5
21:00

Gold

Al-Ittihad (Saudi Arabia)	78–92	(Qatar) Al-Rayyan
Scoring by quarter: 19–22, 20–22, 19–15, 20–33
Pts: Henderson 14		Pts: Johnson 32

MABA Stadium, Kuala Lumpur

== Final standings ==
Rank	Team	Record
Gold medal	(Qatar) Al-Rayyan	6–0
Silver medal	(Saudi Arabia) Al-Ittihad	5–1
Bronze medal	(Syria) Al-Wahda	4–2
4th	(South Korea) Sangmu Phoenix	2–4
5th	(Lebanon) Sagesse	3–2
6th	(Malaysia) Petronas	2–3
7th	(Philippines) Spring Cooking Oil	2–3
8th	(Bahrain) Al-Manama	1–4
9th	(Hong Kong) Winling	2–3
10th	(India) Punjab Police	0–5

== Awards ==
- Most Valuable Player: (United States) Kristaan Johnson (Al-Rayyan)
- Best Three Point Shooter: (South Korea) Son Gyu-Wan (Sangmu)
- Most Valuable Coach: (Egypt) Ahmed Abdul Hadi (Al-Rayyan)
