= Talasbayev =

Talasbayev is a surname. Notable people with the surname include:

- Asylbek Talasbayev (born 1982), Kyrgyzstani boxer
- Kasymkhan Talasbayev (born 1993), Kazakhstani footballer
