= Regal Team =

Professional basketball team in Hong Kong

Regal Team, also known as simply Regal or Regal Energy, was a professional basketball team based in Hong Kong. They played in the Hong Kong A1 Division Championship.

The team won the ABC Champions Cup (nowadays the Basketball Champions League Asia) in 1997, as the first team from Hong Kong to do so. In the consecutive 1998 season, Regal were runners-up after losing to Beijing Hanwei. The following year, Regal decided to withdraw its participation to focus on the Asian Basketball Super League.

== Honours ==
ABC Champions Cup

- Winners (1): 1997
- Runners-up (1): 1998
