= 1996 ABC Champions Cup =

1996 FIBA Asia Champions Cup
7th Asia Champions Cup

Tournament details
- Host country: Philippines
- Dates: 2–9 June
- Teams: 8
- Venue(s): 1 (in 1 host city)

Final positions
- Champions: Philippines (4th title)

Tournament statistics
- MVP: (United States) Tony Harris

The ABC Champions Cup 1996 was the 7th staging of the ABC Champions Cup, the basketball club tournament of Asian Basketball Confederation. The tournament was held in Manila, Philippines between June 2 to 9, 1996.

== Participating teams ==
- (China) Guangdong Winnerway
- (Indonesia) Aspac
- (India) ~~Punjab Police~~ (withdrew)
- (Iran) Paykan Tehran
- (Japan) Isuzu Lynx
- (Jordan) Orthodox
- (Malaysia) Petronas
- ~~Qatar Club~~ (withdrew; Al-Hilal's supposed replacement)
- (Philippines) Hapee Toothpaste (hosts)
- (Saudi Arabia) ~~Al Hilal~~ (withdrew)
- (South Korea) Tong Yang

== Preliminary round ==
=== Group A ===
Team	Pld	W	L	PF	PA	PD	Pts
(Philippines) Hapee Toothpaste	3	3	0	271	233	+38	6
(China) Guangdong Winnerway	3	2	1	248	234	+14	5
(Indonesia) Aspac	3	1	2	244	243	+1	4
(Jordan) Orthodox	3	0	3	239	292	−53	3

June 2

Hapee Toothpaste (Philippines)	79–76	(Indonesia) Aspac

Ninoy Aquino Stadium, Manila

June 3

Guangdong Winnerway (China)	93–73	(Jordan) Orthodox

Ninoy Aquino Stadium, Manila

June 4

Orthodox (Jordan)	86–100	(Indonesia) Aspac

Ninoy Aquino Stadium, Manila

June 4

Hapee Toothpaste (Philippines)	93–77	(China) Guangdong Winnerway

Ninoy Aquino Stadium, Manila

June 5

Orthodox (Jordan)	80–99	(Philippines) Hapee Toothpaste

Ninoy Aquino Stadium, Manila

June 6

Aspac (Indonesia)	68–78	(China) Guangdong Winnerway

Ninoy Aquino Stadium, Manila

=== Group B ===
Team	Pld	W	L	PF	PA	PD	Pts
(Japan) Isuzu Lynx	3	3	0				6
(Malaysia) Petronas	3	2	1				5
(Iran) Paykan Tehran	3	1	2	224	242	−18	4
(South Korea) Tong Yang	3	0	3	214	253	−39	3

June 2

Petronas (Malaysia)	93–78	(Iran) Paykan Tehran

Ninoy Aquino Stadium, Manila

June 3

Isuzu Lynx (Japan)	84–67	(South Korea) Tong Yang

Ninoy Aquino Stadium, Manila

June 4

Petronas (Malaysia)	vs.	(Japan) Isuzu Lynx

Ninoy Aquino Stadium, Manila

June 5

Paykan Tehran (Iran)	80–62	(South Korea) Tong Yang

Ninoy Aquino Stadium, Manila

June 6

Tong Yang (South Korea)	85–89	(Malaysia) Petronas

Ninoy Aquino Stadium, Manila

June 6

Paykan Tehran (Iran)	66–87	(Japan) Isuzu Lynx

Ninoy Aquino Stadium, Manila

== Final round ==
Semifinals
June 8
(Philippines) Hapee Toothpaste	100
(Malaysia) Petronas	89
June 8
(Japan) Isuzu Lynx	89
(China) Guangdong	64

Final
June 9
(Philippines) Hapee Toothpaste	77
(Japan) Isuzu Lynx	74
3rd place
June 9
(Malaysia) Petronas	64
(China) Guangdong	80

=== Semifinals ===
June 8

Isuzu Lynx (Japan)	89–64	(China) Guangdong Winnerway

Ninoy Aquino Stadium, Manila

June 8

Hapee Toothpaste (Philippines)	100–89	(Malaysia) Petronas

Ninoy Aquino Stadium, Manila

=== 3rd place ===
June 9

Petronas (Malaysia)	64–80	(China) Guangdong Winnerway

Ninoy Aquino Stadium, Manila

=== Final ===
June 9

Hapee Toothpaste (Philippines)	77–74	(Japan) Isuzu Lynx

Ninoy Aquino Stadium, Manila

== Final standing ==
Rank	Team	Record
1st place, gold medalist(s)	(Philippines) Hapee Toothpaste	5–0
2nd place, silver medalist(s)	(Japan) Isuzu Lynx	4–1
3rd place, bronze medalist(s)	(China) Guangdong Winnerway	3–2
4	(Malaysia) Petronas	2–3
5	(Indonesia) Aspac	2–2
6	(Iran) Paykan Tehran	1–3
7	(Jordan) Orthodox	1–3
8	(South Korea) Tong Yang	0–4

== Awards ==
- Most Valuable Player: (United States) Tony Harris (Hapee Toothpaste)
