= Fadi El Khatib =

Lebanese basketball player (born 1974)

Fadi Antoine El Khatib
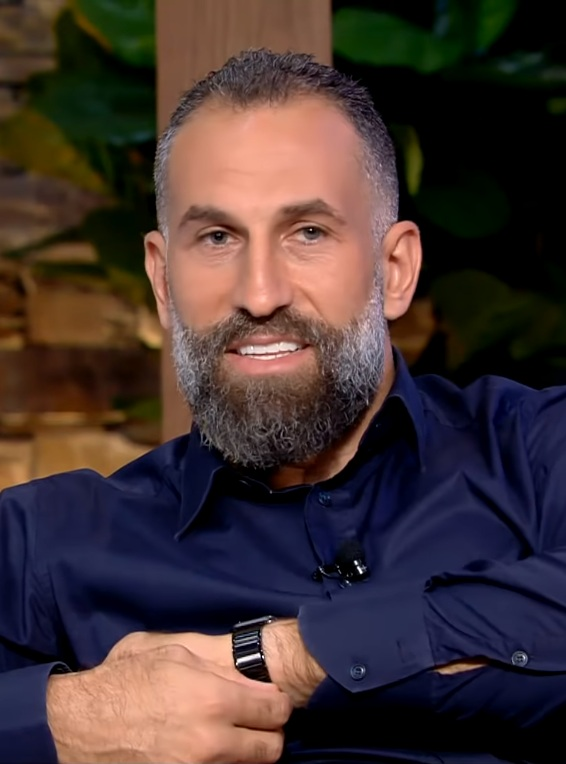
- El Khatib as a guest of MTV Lebanon in 2019

Personal information
- Born: 1 January 1979 (age 47) Shheem, Lebanon
- Listed height: 1.98 m (6 ft 6 in)
- Listed weight: 217 lb (98 kg)

Career information
- Playing career: 1997–2023
- Position: Small forward
- Number: 15

Career history
- 1997–2004: Sagesse
- 2004–2005: Al-Ittihad Aleppo
- 2005–2006: Sagesse
- 2006–2007: Blue Stars
- 2007–2008: Cherkaski Mavpy
- 2008–2009: Al Riyadi Beirut
- 2009–2010: Champville
- 2010–2011: Al Riyadi Beirut
- 2011–2013: Champville
- 2013–2014: Amchit
- 2014–2015: Foshan Long Lions
- 2015: Al Riyadi Beirut
- 2015–2016: Fujian Sturgeons
- 2016–2017: Homenetmen Beirut
- 2017–2020: Champville
- 2022–2023: Sagesse

Career highlights
- 3x FIBA Asia Cup Silver Medallist (2001, 2005, 2007); 2x FIBA Asia Cup All-Star Team (2001, 2005); FIBA Asia Challenge winner (2010); 4x FIBA Asia Champions Cup champion (1999, 2000, 2004, 2011); 2x FIBA Asia Champions Cup MVP (2005, 2011); FIBA Hall of Fame Class of 2025
Medals
Men's basketball
Representing Lebanon
FIBA Asia Championship
Silver medal – second place	2001 Shanghai	Team
Silver medal – second place	2005 Doha	Team
Silver medal – second place	2007 Tokushima	Team
FIBA Asia Challenge
Gold medal – first place	2010 Beirut	Team

Fadi El Khatib (Arabic: فادي الخطيب; born 1 January 1979), nicknamed the "Lebanese Tiger", and "Abu Jihad" is a Lebanese former basketball player. He began his career with Sagesse SC in the Lebanese Basketball League and went on to play for several other teams in Lebanon, as well as professionally abroad in Syria, Ukraine, and China. He was also a member of the Lebanon national team that finished runners-up in the FIBA Asia Championship three times, in 2001, 2005 and 2007. El Khatib also participated in the FIBA World Championship in 2002, 2006 and 2010.

== Professional career ==
El Khatib began playing professionally in 1997, aged 17, at Sagesse, staying with them until 2004. He then moved for one year to Al-Ittihad Aleppo in Syria, before moving back to Sagesse in 2006. With Sagesse, El Khatib won seven Lebanese Basketball League titles, two Arab Club titles, and three FIBA Asia Champions Cup titles.

Throughout his career, El Khatib also played for other Lebanese Basketball League teams such as Al Riyadi Beirut, Champville, Amchit, and Homenetmen Beirut. Between 2015 and 2017, he played in China for Foshan Long Lions and Fujian Sturgeons. El Khatib then returned to Champville in 2017, playing there until his retirement in 2020. In August 2022, El Khatib announced his return to Sagesse Club in a big announcement in which attended his former coach Ghassan Sarkis and former teammate Elie Mechantaf. He announced his final retirement in May 2023.

== National team career ==
In 1999, El Khatib made his debut for the Lebanon national team at the 1999 ABC Championship; Lebanon reached the quarter-finals and finished in seventh place. At the 2001 ABC Championship, El Khatib led Lebanon to a second-place finish; he was named to the 2001 FIBA Asia All-Star Five. With the runners-up finish, Lebanon qualified to the 2002 FIBA World Championship; despite Lebanon losing in the first round, El Khatib finished the tournament among the top ten scorers, with an average of 17.6 points per game.

At the 2005 FIBA Asia Championship, El Khatib averaged 23.0 points per game, and helped Lebanon to reach the final; once again, Lebanon qualified to the 2006 FIBA World Championship. He scored 35 points in the opener against Venezuela, and 29 in a 74–73 win against France. Despite the two wins, Lebanon fell short of qualifying to the round of 16. El Khatib led Lebanon to a third runners-up finish at the 2007 FIBA Asia Championship; he averaged 28.4 points per game throughout the tournament, but lost to Iran 74–69 in the final.

El Khatib eventually participated with Lebanon at the Asia Championship in 2009 and at the World Championship in 2010. He would not participate for Lebanon until 2017, playing his last national-team games at the 2017 FIBA Asia Cup.

== Personal life ==
In July 2020, El Khatib obtained Turkish citizenship by investment in the country. His son, Jihad El Khatib, joined Turkish club Fenerbahçe in October 2020.

== Awards and honours ==
Domestic club

- 11x Lebanese Basketball League champion: 1998, 1999, 2000, 2001, 2002, 2003, 2004, 2009, 2012, 2015, 2016
- 8x Lebanese Basketball Cup champion: 1995, 1997, 1998, 1999, 2000, 2001, 2002, 2003
- 3x Lebanese Basketball League Best Domestic Player: 2006, 2009, 2010
- 4x Lebanese Basketball League All Tournament Team: 2004, 2006, 2007, 2010
- 4x Lebanese Basketball League Player of the year: 2001, 2002, 2003, 2004
- Lebanese Basketball League Forward of the year: 2007
- Lebanese Basketball League scoring leader: 2010
- Syrian Basketball League regular season champion: 2005

International club

- 4x FIBA Asia Champions Cup champion: 1999, 2000, 2004, 2011
- 2x FIBA Asia Champions Cup MVP: 2005, 2011
- 2x FIBA Asia Champions Cup All-Star Team: 2005, 2011
- 3x Arab Club Basketball Championship champion: 1998, 1999, 2010
- Arab Club Basketball Championship All-Star Team: 2010
- Arab Club Basketball Championship Best Domestic Player: 2010

National team

- 3x FIBA Asia Championship Silver Medal winner: 2001, 2005, 2007
- 2x FIBA Asia Championship All-Star Team: 2001, 2005
- FIBA Asia Championship Best Forward: 2005
- FIBA Asia Stankovic Cup winner: 2010
- 2x WABA Championship champion: 2000
- West Asia MVP: 2001, 2002
- Efes Pilsen World Cup 9 Bronze Medal winner: 2010
