= Kris Johnson (basketball) =

American basketball player (born 1975)

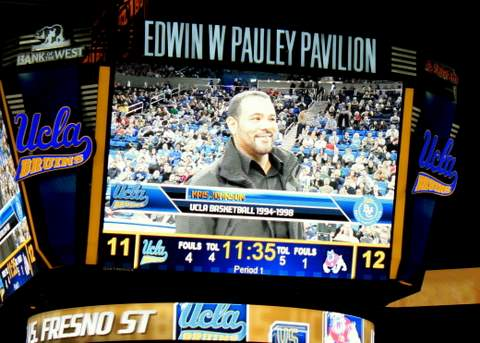
- Johnson on scoreboard during an appearance at Pauley Pavilion in 2012.

Personal information
- Born: November 18, 1975 (age 50) Los Angeles, California, U.S.
- Listed height: 6 ft 5 in (1.96 m)
- Listed weight: 220 lb (100 kg)

Career information
- High school: Montclair Prep (Van Nuys, California); Crenshaw (Los Angeles, California)
- College: UCLA (1994–1998)
- NBA draft: 1998: undrafted
- Playing career: c. 1998–c. 2006
- Position: Small forward / shooting guard

Career history
- ?: Avtodor Saratov
- 1999–2000: Quad City Thunder
- 2000: Sioux Falls Skyforce
- 2001–2003: Al Rayyan
- ?: Riyadi
- 2005: Antranik

Career highlights
- ABC Champions Cup champion (2002); ABC Champions Cup MVP (2002); NCAA champion (1995)

Kristaan Iman Johnson (born November 18, 1975) is an American former professional basketball player. He played college basketball for the UCLA Bruins, winning an NCAA championship his freshman year in 1995. Johnson played eight years professionally in multiple countries, winning the Asian Basketball Confederation (ABC) Champions Cup in 2002 and being named the tournament's Most Valuable Player (MVP). He later worked as a basketball analyst for Fox Sports before starting his own sports website, JerseyChaser.com.

Johnson played high school basketball for Crenshaw High School, where he was named Los Angeles City Section Player of the Year and won two consecutive California state basketball championships. He and his father, Marques—who played basketball professionally in the National Basketball Association (NBA) and college under legendary coach John Wooden at UCLA—are one of the few father–son combinations to either each be named Los Angeles City Section Player of the Year or to have both won an NCAA basketball championship.

== Early life ==
Johnson was born in Los Angeles on November 18, 1975, to former NBA player Marques Johnson and health and beauty practitioner Sabrina Sheran. He changed schools often due to his father's changing locations during his professional basketball career. He estimated he attended 27 schools. In 1987, Johnson was instructed to watch his 15-month-old brother, Marques Jr., when his little brother later accidentally drowned in the pool of the family's home in Bel Air in Los Angeles. Johnson contemplated suicide. His parents decided to move Johnson to Atlanta with his mother to ease the pain. He ended up in juvenile court after a school incident and was later kicked out of the Clayton County school system. After repeated conflicts with his mother, Johnson returned to Los Angeles, and he did not speak to his mother for three years.

Johnson gained weight and was taunted by kids. He played two years at Montclair Prep, where he lost 40 pounds (18 kg) between his freshman and sophomore years. He transferred his junior year from the private school of mostly whites to Crenshaw High School, a predominantly black public school. His father had told him that his best chance of playing for a big Division I college like UCLA was to attend a school like Crenshaw, where Marques had starred. Johnson averaged 22.6 points and 14 rebounds his first season at Crenshaw and won the Los Angeles City Section 4-A Player of the Year; he and Marques, who won the award in 1973, became the first father–son combo to be honored. (Note: Dwayne Polee (1981) and Dwayne Jr. (2010) also won the award.) Johnson won the California Interscholastic Federation (CIF) State Division I championship with Crenshaw that season as well as in his senior year in 1994. He averaged 23.3 points and 9.2 rebounds his final season. Johnson associated with gangs while at Crenshaw, which was in the Crips' territory. He was once shot at by a member of the Bloods, a rival gang.

== UCLA career ==
Johnson caught UCLA's attention during recruiting with his ability to score and rebound in traffic. He was tough to defend, especially when he backed in toward the basket. He became the third Crenshaw High basketball player to attend UCLA—his father was the first. (Note: Gary Maloncon was the second.) Marques had won the 1977 John R. Wooden Award as the college basketball player of the year. Johnson chose UCLA over Washington State, Arizona State, Arizona, Loyola Marymount, Ohio State and Louisville. He was a key player from 1994 to 1998 at UCLA, where he wore his father's No. 54. Like his father, he won a national championship. The Johnsons are one of four father-son duos to each win an NCAA basketball championship. (Note: The others are Scott and Sean May, Henry and Mike Bibby, and Derek and Nolan Smith.) UCLA was 102–27 and won three consecutive Pacific-10 titles during Johnson's career. A 6-foot-4-inch (1.93 m) swingman with the ability to score in the low post and outside, Johnson was at times between 20 pounds (9.1 kg) and 50 pounds (23 kg) overweight. Combined with his temper, he was called by one newspaper "The Round Mound of Sound", a play on Charles Barkley's nickname of "The Round Mound of Rebound". Johnson lost another 30 pounds (14 kg) after his first year. He was listed at 239 pounds (108 kg) in his senior year.

He was slowed by arthroscopic surgery the summer before in his college freshman season. After impressive preseason practices during the fall, UCLA coaches projected him as a major contributor. However, he suffered a small stress fracture in his left leg and was sidelined for one month. Johnson returned 20 pounds (9.1 kg) heavier, but never regained his conditioning and was removed from UCLA's regular rotation. He initially pouted on the bench and was thrown out of practice, but he later became supportive of the team's success and retained his teammates' respect. UCLA won the NCAA tournament, which Johnson in 2009 called "the greatest experience of his life." His second season in 1995–96 ended with UCLA's 43–41 upset loss to Ivy League champion Princeton in the first round of the NCAA tournament. "There was just a lot of chemistry-type issues about who was going to be the star," said Johnson about the team. "I can't say we were the most focused team going into the tournament. We kind of went into it like, 'Ivy League, schmivey league.' It was a total 'whatever.' What-ever." In his junior season in 1996–97, the Bruins won 12 consecutive games before losing in the Elite Eight.

Johnson was suspended for 50 days in the 1997–98 season, reportedly violating the school's drug policy on marijuana. He also enrolled in a violence intervention program. While nobody ever blamed Johnson for Marques Jr.'s death, he was not able to overcome the guilt over the death until after his suspension. "I knew I couldn't carry that weight for the rest of my life. My career, everything I had worked for, was hanging in the balance. My life flashed before my eyes," he said. Johnson led UCLA in scoring in his senior year with an 18.4 average, 21.1 in Pac-10 play. He also averaged 5.0 rebounds and was named All-Pac-10 honorable mention. He was honored as the team's co-Most Valuable Player along with Toby Bailey and J.R. Henderson. Johnson became so responsible after the suspension that coach Steve Lavin used him as a model for the freshmen. "The trivial things that made him mad before don't bother him. He sees the bigger picture. He always felt like he had something to prove. Now, he seems at peace," said Bailey. The team advanced to the Sweet 16 in the NCAA tournament that season.

== Professional career ==
The Los Angeles Daily News wrote that Johnson lacked the quickness and defensive ability to play shooting guard in the NBA, and was too short to play small forward. He was projected to be an undrafted free agent or a player in Europe. Johnson was drafted by the Yakima Sun Kings in the eighth round with the 67th pick of the 1998 Continental Basketball Association draft. "I saw him work out in Seattle with (NBA draft picks) Felipe López, Corey Benjamin and Miles Simon, and he was as good or better than those guys," said Kings coach Paul Woopert.

He played professionally for eight seasons in Russia, Turkey, Qatar, Lebanon, and China. He started playing in Russia for Avtodor Saratov before playing in Turkey for a few months. He returned to the United States and played in the Continental Basketball Association for the Quad City Thunder in the 1999–2000 season and briefly the next season for the Sioux Falls Skyforce in 2000. He next went to Qatar and played in 2001–2003 with Al Rayyan, winning the 2002 Asian Basketball Confederation (ABC) Champions Cup; Johnson scored 32 points in the championship game and was named the MVP of the tournament. He later went to Lebanon to join Riyadi, and then Antranik in 2005.

== Outside basketball ==
Johnson worked at Fox Sports starting in 2008, where he worked for three years and served as a college basketball studio analyst and co-host of a segment named "Beyond the Arc." He managed several business ventures, and started the sports website JerseyChaser.com.

== Personal ==
Johnson has a younger brother, Josiah, who also played basketball at Montclair Prep and UCLA. Another younger brother, Moriah, enrolled at Tuskegee University in 2011 and joined its basketball team; he also co-starred on the reality television series, Baldwin Hills.
