= Kasymkhan Talasbayev =

Kazakhstani footballer

Personal information
- Full name: Kasymkhan Dosumhanuly Talasbayev
- Date of birth: 27 February 1993 (age 33)
- Place of birth: Kazakhstan
- Positions: Defender; midfielder

Senior career*
Years	Team	Apps	(Gls)
2011	FC Alma-Ata	29	(0)
2012-2013	FC Kairat	1	(0)
2014	FC Kyzylzhar	18	(0)
2015	BC SKA Alma-Ata	12	(1)
2017	Viljandi JK Tulevik	15	(2)
- * Club domestic league appearances and goals

Kasymkhan Talasbayev (Russian: Касымхан Таласбаев; born 27 February 1993 in Kazakhstan) is a Kazakhstani footballer.
