= 1984 Asian Basketball Club Championship =

1984 FIBA Asia Champions Cup
2nd Asia Champions Cup

Tournament details
- Host country: Malaysia
- Dates: 22 November–3 December
- Teams: 13
- Venue(s): 1 (in 1 host city)

Final positions
- Champions: Philippines (1st title)

The Asian Basketball Club Championship 1984 was the 2nd staging of the Asian Basketball Club Championship, the basketball club tournament of Asian Basketball Confederation. The tournament was held in Ipoh, Malaysia, November 22 to December 3, 1984.

== Preliminary round ==
=== Group A ===
Team	Pld	W	L	Pts
(Philippines) Northern Cement	3	3	0	6
(China) Bayi Rockets	3	2	1	5
(Qatar) Al-Arabi	3	1	2	4
(Macau) G. D. Wa Seng	3	0	3	3

November 23

Bayi Rockets (China)	71–65	(Qatar) Al-Arabi

Indera Mulia Stadium, Ipoh

November 24

Northern Cement (Philippines)	126–25	(Macau) G. D. Wa Seng

Indera Mulia Stadium, Ipoh

November 25

Northern Cement (Philippines)	91–69	(Qatar) Al-Arabi

Indera Mulia Stadium, Ipoh

November 27

Bayi Rockets (China)	62–86	(Philippines) Northern Cement

Indera Mulia Stadium, Ipoh

=== Group B ===
Team	Pld	W	L	Pts
(Malaysia) PKN Selangor	3	3	0	6
(Bahrain) Al-Ahli	3	2	1	5
(Thailand) Bangkok Bank	3	1	2	4
(Sri Lanka) Colombo	3	0	3	3

November 23

Al-Ahli (Bahrain)	88–72	(Thailand) Bangkok Bank

Indera Mulia Stadium, Ipoh

November 25

PKN Selangor (Malaysia)	85–61	(Thailand) Bangkok Bank

Indera Mulia Stadium, Ipoh

November 25

Al-Ahli (Bahrain)	106–71	(Sri Lanka) Colombo

Indera Mulia Stadium, Ipoh

November 26

Bangkok Bank (Thailand)	99–76	(Sri Lanka) Colombo

Indera Mulia Stadium, Ipoh

=== Group C ===
Team	Pld	W	L	Pts
(Chinese Taipei) Kuang Hua	4	4	0	8
(Hong Kong) South China	4	3	1	7
(Kuwait) Al-Qadsia	4	2	2	6
(Singapore) Asia Electric	4	1	3	5
Brunei	4	0	4	4

November 23

Asia Electric (Singapore)	53–74	(Kuwait) Al-Qadsia

Indera Mulia Stadium, Ipoh

November 23

Kuang Hua (Chinese Taipei)	137–50	Brunei

Indera Mulia Stadium, Ipoh

November 25

Brunei	60–95	(Singapore) Asia Electric

Indera Mulia Stadium, Ipoh

November 25

South China (Hong Kong)	62–107	(Chinese Taipei) Kuang Hua

Indera Mulia Stadium, Ipoh

November 26

Kuang Hua (Chinese Taipei)	77–34	(Singapore) Asia Electric

Indera Mulia Stadium, Ipoh

November 26

Al-Qadsia (Kuwait)	73–74	(Hong Kong) South China

Indera Mulia Stadium, Ipoh

== Second round ==
- The results and the points of the matches between the same teams that were already played during the preliminary round shall be taken into account for the second round.

=== Classification 7th–12th ===
Team	Pld	W	L	Pts
(Qatar) Al-Arabi	5	5	0	10
(Thailand) Bangkok Bank	5	4	1	9
(Kuwait) Al-Qadsia	5	3	2	8
(Singapore) Asia Electric	5	2	3	7
(Sri Lanka) Colombo	5	1	4	6
(Macau) G. D. Wa Seng	5	0	5	5

November 29

Al-Qadsia (Kuwait)	vs.	(Qatar) Al-Arabi

Indera Mulia Stadium, Ipoh

November 29

Asia Electric (Singapore)	vs.	(Thailand) Bangkok Bank

Indera Mulia Stadium, Ipoh

November 29

G. D. Wa Seng (Macau)	vs.	(Sri Lanka) Colombo

Indera Mulia Stadium, Ipoh

November 30

Colombo (Sri Lanka)	74–119	(Qatar) Al-Arabi

Indera Mulia Stadium, Ipoh

November 30

Asia Electric (Singapore)	92–75	(Macau) G. D. Wa Seng

Indera Mulia Stadium, Ipoh

November 30

Bangkok Bank (Thailand)	83–60	(Kuwait) Al-Qadsia

Indera Mulia Stadium, Ipoh

December 1

Al-Arabi (Qatar)	104–92	(Singapore) Asia Electric

Indera Mulia Stadium, Ipoh

December 1

G. D. Wa Seng (Macau)	123–163	(Thailand) Bangkok Bank

Indera Mulia Stadium, Ipoh

December 1

Al-Qadsia (Kuwait)	86–64	(Sri Lanka) Colombo

Indera Mulia Stadium, Ipoh

December 2

Al-Arabi (Qatar)	100–64	(Thailand) Bangkok Bank

Indera Mulia Stadium, Ipoh

December 2

Al-Qadsia (Kuwait)	91–65	(Macau) G. D. Wa Seng

Indera Mulia Stadium, Ipoh

December 2

Colombo (Sri Lanka)	64–97	(Singapore) Asia Electric

Indera Mulia Stadium, Ipoh

=== Championship ===
Team	Pld	W	L	Pts
(Philippines) Northern Cement	5	5	0	10
(China) Bayi Rockets	5	4	1	9
(Malaysia) PKN Selangor	5	3	2	8
(Chinese Taipei) Kuang Hua	5	2	3	7
(Bahrain) Al-Ahli	5	1	4	6
(Hong Kong) South China	5	0	5	5

November 29

Bayi Rockets (China)	98–70	(Chinese Taipei) Kuang Hua

Indera Mulia Stadium, Ipoh

November 29

PKN Selangor (Malaysia)	102–67	(Hong Kong) South China

Indera Mulia Stadium, Ipoh

November 29

Al-Ahli (Bahrain)	66–94	(Philippines) Northern Cement

Indera Mulia Stadium, Ipoh

November 30

Kuang Hua (Chinese Taipei)	61–67	(Malaysia) PKN Selangor

Indera Mulia Stadium, Ipoh

November 30

Bayi Rockets (China)	81–68	(Bahrain) Al-Ahli

Indera Mulia Stadium, Ipoh

November 30

South China (Hong Kong)	54–127	(Philippines) Northern Cement

Indera Mulia Stadium, Ipoh

December 1

Al-Ahli (Bahrain)	94–78	(Hong Kong) South China

Indera Mulia Stadium, Ipoh

December 1

PKN Selangor (Malaysia)	75–91	(China) Bayi Rockets

Indera Mulia Stadium, Ipoh

December 1

Northern Cement (Philippines)	90–51	(Chinese Taipei) Kuang Hua

Indera Mulia Stadium, Ipoh

December 2

Northern Cement (Philippines)	95–56	(Malaysia) PKN Selangor

Indera Mulia Stadium, Ipoh

December 2

Kuang Hua (Chinese Taipei)	89–71	(Bahrain) Al-Ahli

Indera Mulia Stadium, Ipoh

December 2

South China (Hong Kong)	82–127	(China) Bayi Rockets

Indera Mulia Stadium, Ipoh

== Final round ==
=== 3rd place ===
December 3
19:00

PKN Selangor (Malaysia)	68–82	(Chinese Taipei) Kuang Hua
Scoring by half: 33–46, 35–36

Indera Mulia Stadium, Ipoh

=== Final ===
December 3
20:30

Northern Cement (Philippines)	82–56	(China) Bayi Rockets
Scoring by half: 47–31, 35–25

Indera Mulia Stadium, Ipoh

== Final standing ==
Qualified for the 1985 Intercontinental Cup

Rank	Team	Record
1st place, gold medalist(s)	(Philippines) Northern Cement	8–0
2nd place, silver medalist(s)	(China) Bayi Rockets	6–2
3rd place, bronze medalist(s)	(Chinese Taipei) Kuang Hua	6–3
4	(Malaysia) PKN Selangor	5–3
5	(Bahrain) Al-Ahli	3–4
6	(Hong Kong) South China	3–5
7	(Qatar) Al-Arabi	5–2
8	(Thailand) Bangkok Bank	4–3
9	(Kuwait) Al-Qadsia	4–4
10	(Singapore) Asia Electric	3–5
11	(Sri Lanka) Colombo	1–6
12	(Macau) G. D. Wa Seng	0–7
13	Brunei	0–4
