= 1995 ABC Champions Cup =

1995 FIBA Asia Champions Cup
6th Asia Champions Cup

Tournament details
- Host country: Malaysia
- Dates: 17–24 September
- Teams: 10
- Venue(s): 1 (in 1 host city)

Final positions
- Champions: Philippines (3rd title)

Tournament statistics
- MVP: (United States) Bobby Parks

The ABC Champions Cup 1995 was the 6th staging of the ABC Champions Cup, the basketball club tournament of Asian Basketball Confederation. The tournament was held in Kuala Lumpur, Malaysia between September 17 to September 24, 1995.

== Preliminary round ==
=== Group A ===
Team	Pld	W	L	Pts
(Philippines) Andok's	4	4	0	8
(Jordan) Al-Ahli	4	3	1	7
(China) Liaoning Hunters	4	2	2	6
(Iran) Zob Ahan Isfahan	4	1	3	5
(Chinese Taipei) Hong Fu Rams	4	0	4	4

September 17

Liaoning Hunters (China)	vs.	(Chinese Taipei) Hong Fu Rams

Stadium Negara, Kuala Lumpur

September 17

Al-Ahli (Jordan)	vs.	(Iran) Zob Ahan Isfahan

Stadium Negara, Kuala Lumpur

September 18

Andok's (Philippines)	98–79	(China) Liaoning Hunters

Stadium Negara, Kuala Lumpur

September 19

Al-Ahli (Jordan)	80–86	(Philippines) Andok's

Stadium Negara, Kuala Lumpur

September 20

Andok's (Philippines)	98–82	(Iran) Zob Ahan Isfahan

Stadium Negara, Kuala Lumpur

September 21

Hong Fu Rams (Chinese Taipei)	92–100	(Philippines) Andok's

Stadium Negara, Kuala Lumpur

=== Group B ===
Team	Pld	W	L	Pts
(Malaysia) Petronas	4	4	0	8
(South Korea) Kia Motors	4	3	1	7
Japan Energy	4	2	2	6
(Singapore) Sin Kee	4	1	3	5
(India) Punjab Police	4	0	4	4

== Final round ==
Semifinals
September 23
(Philippines) Andok's	74
(South Korea) Kia Motors	65
September 23
(Malaysia) Petronas	83
(Jordan) Al-Ahli	70

Final
September 24
(Philippines) Andok's	101
(Malaysia) Petronas	82
3rd place
September 24
(South Korea) Kia Motors
(Jordan) Al-Ahli

=== Semifinals ===
September 23

Andok's (Philippines)	74–65	(South Korea) Kia Motors

Stadium Negara, Kuala Lumpur

September 23

Petronas (Malaysia)	83–70	(Jordan) Al-Ahli

Stadium Negara, Kuala Lumpur

=== 3rd place ===
September 24

Kia Motors (South Korea)	vs.	(Jordan) Al-Ahli

Stadium Negara, Kuala Lumpur

=== Final ===
September 24

Andok's (Philippines)	101–82	(Malaysia) Petronas
Scoring by half: 52–37, 49–45

Stadium Negara, Kuala Lumpur

== Final standing ==
Rank	Team
1st place, gold medalist(s)	(Philippines) Andok's
2nd place, silver medalist(s)	(Malaysia) Petronas
3rd place, bronze medalist(s)	(South Korea) Kia Motors
4	(Jordan) Al-Ahli
5	(China) Liaoning Hunters
6	Japan Energy
7	(Iran) Zob Ahan Isfahan
8	(Singapore) Sin Kee
9	(Chinese Taipei) Hong Fu Rams
10	(India) Punjab Police

== Awards ==
- Most Valuable Player: (United States) Bobby Parks (Andok's)
