= 2001 ABC Champions Cup =

2001 FIBA Asia Champions Cup
12th Asia Champions Cup

Tournament details
- Host country: United Arab Emirates
- Dates: 1–8 June
- Teams: 11
- Venue(s): 1 (in 1 host city)

Final positions
- Champions: Saudi Arabia (1st title)

Tournament statistics
- MVP: (United States) Johnny Rhodes

The ABC Champions Cup 2001 was the 12th staging of the ABC Champions Cup, the basketball club tournament of Asian Basketball Confederation. The tournament was held in Dubai, United Arab Emirates between June 1 to 8, 2001.

== Preliminary round ==
=== Group A ===
Team	Pld	W	L	PF	PA	PD	Pts	Tiebreaker
(Qatar) Al-Rayyan	4	3	1	353	323	+30	7	1–0
(Syria) Al-Wahda	4	3	1	383	345	+38	7	0–1
(Lebanon) Sagesse	4	2	2	341	340	+1	6	1–0
(Indonesia) ASPAC Texmaco	4	2	2	382	359	+23	6	0–1
(Kuwait) Al-Qadsia	4	0	4	316	408	−92	4	

June 1

ASPAC (Indonesia)	93–94	(Syria) Al-Wahda

Al-Ahli Indoor Sports Hall, Dubai

June 1

Al-Qadsia (Kuwait)	78–96	(Qatar) Al-Rayyan

Al-Ahli Indoor Sports Hall, Dubai

June 2

Al-Wahda (Syria)	113–79	(Kuwait) Al-Qadsia

Al-Ahli Indoor Sports Hall, Dubai

June 2

ASPAC (Indonesia)	86–97	(Lebanon) Sagesse

Al-Ahli Indoor Sports Hall, Dubai

June 3

Al-Qadsia (Kuwait)	69–98	(Indonesia) ASPAC

Al-Ahli Indoor Sports Hall, Dubai

June 3

Sagesse (Lebanon)	59–69	(Qatar) Al-Rayyan

Al-Ahli Indoor Sports Hall, Dubai

June 4

Al-Wahda (Syria)	81–89	(Qatar) Al-Rayyan

Al-Ahli Indoor Sports Hall, Dubai

June 4

Al-Qadsia (Kuwait)	90–101	(Lebanon) Sagesse

Al-Ahli Indoor Sports Hall, Dubai

June 5

Al-Rayyan (Qatar)	99–105	(Indonesia) ASPAC

Al-Ahli Indoor Sports Hall, Dubai

June 5

Sagesse (Lebanon)	84–95	(Syria) Al-Wahda

Al-Ahli Indoor Sports Hall, Dubai

=== Group B ===
Team	Pld	W	L	PF	PA	PD	Pts	Tiebreaker
(Saudi Arabia) Al-Ittihad	5	5	0	452	397	+55	10	
(Hong Kong) Winling	5	3	2	428	444	−16	8	1–0
(United Arab Emirates) Al-Ahli	5	3	2	361	343	+18	8	0–1
(Bahrain) Al-Manama	5	2	3	418	416	+2	7	1–0
(Iran) Zob Ahan Esfahan	5	2	3	416	395	+21	7	0–1
(Malaysia) Petronas	5	0	5	333	413	−80	5	

June 1

Al-Manama (Bahrain)	75–67	(Iran) Zob Ahan

Al-Ahli Indoor Sports Hall, Dubai

June 1

Al-Ittihad (Saudi Arabia)	105–91	(Hong Kong) Winling

Al-Ahli Indoor Sports Hall, Dubai

June 1

Petronas (Malaysia)	49–69	(United Arab Emirates) Al-Ahli

Al-Ahli Indoor Sports Hall, Dubai

June 2

Zob Ahan (Iran)	101–80	(Hong Kong) Winling

Al-Ahli Indoor Sports Hall, Dubai

June 2

Al-Ahli (United Arab Emirates)	78–73	(Bahrain) Al-Manama

Al-Ahli Indoor Sports Hall, Dubai

June 2

Petronas (Malaysia)	68–86	(Saudi Arabia) Al-Ittihad

Al-Ahli Indoor Sports Hall, Dubai

June 3

Winling (Hong Kong)	79–71	(United Arab Emirates) Al-Ahli

Al-Ahli Indoor Sports Hall, Dubai

June 3

Al-Manama (Bahrain)	82–75	(Malaysia) Petronas

Al-Ahli Indoor Sports Hall, Dubai

June 3

Al-Ittihad (Saudi Arabia)	91–82	(Iran) Zob Ahan

Al-Ahli Indoor Sports Hall, Dubai

June 4

Petronas (Malaysia)	74–81	(Hong Kong) Winling

Al-Ahli Indoor Sports Hall, Dubai

June 4

Al-Ahli (United Arab Emirates)	82–71	(Iran) Zob Ahan

Al-Ahli Indoor Sports Hall, Dubai

June 4

Al-Manama (Bahrain)	95–99	(Saudi Arabia) Al-Ittihad

Al-Ahli Indoor Sports Hall, Dubai

June 5

Zob Ahan (Iran)	95–67	(Malaysia) Petronas

Al-Ahli Indoor Sports Hall, Dubai

June 5

Winling (Hong Kong)	97–93	(Bahrain) Al-Manama

Al-Ahli Indoor Sports Hall, Dubai

June 5

Al-Ahli (United Arab Emirates)	61–71	(Saudi Arabia) Al-Ittihad

Al-Ahli Indoor Sports Hall, Dubai

== Knockout round ==
Semi-finals
June 7 – Dubai
(Saudi Arabia) Al-Ittihad	111
(Syria) Al-Wahda	94
June 7 – Dubai
(Qatar) Al-Rayyan	89
(Hong Kong) Winling	68

Final
June 8 – Dubai
(Saudi Arabia) Al-Ittihad (OT)	103
(Qatar) Al-Rayyan	101
Third place
June 8 – Dubai
(Syria) Al-Wahda	93
(Hong Kong) Winling	79

=== Semifinals ===
June 7

Semis

Al-Rayyan (Qatar)	89–68	(Hong Kong) Winling

Al-Ahli Indoor Sports Hall, Dubai

June 7

Semis

Al-Ittihad (Saudi Arabia)	111–94	(Syria) Al-Wahda

Al-Ahli Indoor Sports Hall, Dubai

=== Finals ===
June 7

9th–10th

Zob Ahan (Iran)	97–86	(Kuwait) Al-Qadsia

Al-Ahli Indoor Sports Hall, Dubai

June 7

7th–8th

ASPAC (Indonesia)	95–62	(Bahrain) Al-Manama

Al-Ahli Indoor Sports Hall, Dubai

June 8

5th–6th

Sagesse (Lebanon)	66–77	(United Arab Emirates) Al-Ahli

Al-Ahli Indoor Sports Hall, Dubai

June 8

Bronze

Al-Wahda (Syria)	93–79	(Hong Kong) Winling

Al-Ahli Indoor Sports Hall, Dubai

June 8
21:30

Gold

Al-Ittihad (Saudi Arabia)	103–101 (OT)	(Qatar) Al-Rayyan
Scoring by quarter: 26–29, 21–28, 30–19, 17–18, Overtime: 9–7
Pts: Al-Mawalid, Vyšniauskas 20		Pts: Ismail 23

Al-Ahli Indoor Sports Hall, Dubai

== Final standings ==
Rank	Team	Record
Gold medal	(Saudi Arabia) Al-Ittihad	7–0
Silver medal	(Qatar) Al-Rayyan	4–2
Bronze medal	(Syria) Al-Wahda	4–2
4th	(Hong Kong) Winling	3–4
5th	(United Arab Emirates) Al-Ahli	4–2
6th	(Lebanon) Sagesse	2–3
7th	(Indonesia) ASPAC Texmaco	3–2
8th	(Bahrain) Al-Manama	2–4
9th	(Iran) Zob Ahan Esfahan	3–3
10th	(Kuwait) Al-Qadsia	0–5
11th	(Malaysia) Petronas	0–5

== Awards ==
- Most Valuable Player: (United States) Johnny Rhodes (Al-Ittihad)
- Most Valuable Coach: (Saudi Arabia) Abdul Hameed Ibrahim (Al-Ittihad)
- Best Rebounder: (United States) Eddie Washington (ASPAC)
- Best Three Point Shooter: (United States) Darren Henrie (Winling)
- Best Scorer: (United States) Andre Pitts (Al-Wahda)
- Best Sixth Man: (Qatar) Mohammed Yousuf (Al-Rayyan)
- Best Sportsmanship: (Senegal) Assane N'Diaye (Sagesse)
- Fair Play: (United Arab Emirates) Al-Ahli
