= MABA Stadium =

Sports venue in Kuala Lumpur, Malaysia

- Stadium Bola Keranjang Malaysia
- Full name: Malaysian Basketball Association Stadium
- Address: Kuala Lumpur; Malaysia
- Owner: Malaysian Basketball Association
- Capacity: 1,800
- Type: Indoor arena

Construction
- Built: 1995
- Renovated: 2017
- Closed: 2026
- Cost: RM13.5 million

The Malaysian Basketball Association (MABA) Stadium (Malay: Stadium Bola Keranjang Malaysia) was an indoor arena in Kuala Lumpur, Malaysia. It is the main venue of the Malaysian Basketball Association, the national basketball federation for basketball in Malaysia.

The MABA Stadium was built in 1995 at the cost of RM13.5 million. It has a capacity to accommodate 1,800 people. The venue was renovated in 2017 for the 29th Southeast Asian Games.

== Demolition ==
The stadium was demolished in 2026 to make way for a 60-storey serviced apartment comprising two towers named Maba Suitez. MABA will receive RM170 million for the site, of which RM120 million will be used by the association to purchase serviced apartments at Maba Suitez.
