= 1998 ABC Champions Cup =

1998 FIBA Asia Champions Cup
9th Asia Champions Cup
- Official logo

Tournament details
- Host country: Malaysia
- Dates: 25 April–2 May
- Teams: 10
- Venue: 1 (in 1 host city)

Final positions
- Champions: China (3rd title)

Tournament statistics
- MVP: (United States) Michael Cumberland

The ABC Champions Cup 1998 was the 9th staging of the ABC Champions Cup, the basketball club tournament of Asian Basketball Confederation. The tournament was held in Kuala Lumpur, Malaysia, between April 25 to May 2, 1998.

== Preliminary round ==
=== Group A ===
Team	Pld	W	L	Pts	Tiebreaker
(Hong Kong) Regal	4	3	1	7	1–1 / 1.062
(Lebanon) Al-Riyadi Beirut	4	3	1	7	1–1 / 0.987
(Japan) Toshiba Red Thunders	4	3	1	7	1–1 / 0.950
(Philippines) Beeper 150	4	1	3	5	
(Thailand) Bangkok Club	4	0	4	4	

Toshiba Red Thunders (Japan)	70–66	(Lebanon) Al-Riyadi Beirut

Stadium Negara, Kuala Lumpur

Beeper 150 (Philippines)	91–58	(Thailand) Bangkok Club

Stadium Negara, Kuala Lumpur

Bangkok Club (Thailand)	vs.	(Lebanon) Al-Riyadi Beirut

Stadium Negara, Kuala Lumpur

Regal (Hong Kong)	83–68	(Philippines) Beeper 150

Stadium Negara, Kuala Lumpur

April 27

Beeper 150 (Philippines)	86–88	(Japan) Toshiba Red Thunders

Stadium Negara, Kuala Lumpur

April 27

Bangkok Club (Thailand)	61–72	(Hong Kong) Regal

Stadium Negara, Kuala Lumpur

April 28

Regal (Hong Kong)	75–64	(Japan) Toshiba Red Thunders

Stadium Negara, Kuala Lumpur

April 28

Al-Riyadi Beirut (Lebanon)	99–77	(Philippines) Beeper 150

Stadium Negara, Kuala Lumpur

April 29

Toshiba Red Thunders (Japan)	74–69	(Thailand) Bangkok Club

Stadium Negara, Kuala Lumpur

April 29

Al-Riyadi Beirut (Lebanon)	82–80	(Hong Kong) Regal

Stadium Negara, Kuala Lumpur

=== Group B ===
Team	Pld	W	L	Pts
(China) Beijing Hanwei	4	4	0	8
(South Korea) Hyundai Dynat	4	3	1	7
(Malaysia) Petronas	4	2	2	6
(Uzbekistan) MHSK Tashkent	4	1	3	5
(Indonesia) PanAsia Indosyntec	4	0	4	4

April 25

Hyundai Dynat (South Korea)	vs.	(Uzbekistan) MHSK Tashkent

Stadium Negara, Kuala Lumpur

April 25

PanAsia Indosyntec (Indonesia)	vs.	(Malaysia) Petronas

Stadium Negara, Kuala Lumpur

April 26

Hyundai Dynat (South Korea)	vs.	(Indonesia) PanAsia Indosyntec

Stadium Negara, Kuala Lumpur

April 26

MHSK Tashkent (Uzbekistan)	81–90	(China) Beijing Hanwei

Stadium Negara, Kuala Lumpur

April 27

Beijing Hanwei (China)	83–66	(South Korea) Hyundai Dynat

Stadium Negara, Kuala Lumpur

April 27

Petronas (Malaysia)	74–71	(Uzbekistan) MHSK Tashkent

Stadium Negara, Kuala Lumpur

April 28

MHSK Tashkent (Uzbekistan)	89–77	(Indonesia) PanAsia Indosyntec

Stadium Negara, Kuala Lumpur

April 28

Beijing Hanwei (China)	93–60	(Malaysia) Petronas

Stadium Negara, Kuala Lumpur

April 29

PanAsia Indosyntec (Indonesia)	80–102	(China) Beijing Hanwei

Stadium Negara, Kuala Lumpur

April 29

Petronas (Malaysia)	70–80	(South Korea) Hyundai Dynat

Stadium Negara, Kuala Lumpur

== Classification 5th–10th ==
=== 9th place ===
May 1

Bangkok Club (Thailand)	68–72 (OT)	(Indonesia) PanAsia Indosyntec

Stadium Negara, Kuala Lumpur

=== 7th place ===
May 1

Pangasinan Presidents (Philippines)	84–88	(Uzbekistan) MHSK Tashkent

Stadium Negara, Kuala Lumpur

=== 5th place ===
May 2
17:30

Toshiba Red Thunders (Japan)	91–70	(Malaysia) Petronas
Scoring by half: 47–37, 44–33

Stadium Negara, Kuala Lumpur

== Final round ==
Semifinals
May 1
(Hong Kong) Regal	77
(South Korea) Hyundai	63
May 1
(China) Hanwei	85
(Lebanon) Al-Riyadi	80

Final
May 2
(Hong Kong) Regal	70
(China) Hanwei	71
3rd place
May 2
(South Korea) Hyundai	77
(Lebanon) Al-Riyadi	87

=== Semifinals ===
May 1
19:30

Regal (Hong Kong)	77–60	(South Korea) Hyundai Dynat
Scoring by half: 47–29, 30–31

Stadium Negara, Kuala Lumpur

May 1
21:15

Beijing Hanwei (China)	85–80	(Lebanon) Al-Riyadi

Stadium Negara, Kuala Lumpur

=== 3rd place ===
May 2
19:00

Hyundai Dynat (South Korea)	77–87	(Lebanon) Al-Riyadi

Stadium Negara, Kuala Lumpur

=== Final ===
May 2
21:00

Regal (Hong Kong)	70–71	(China) Beijing Hanwei
Scoring by half: 34–36, 36–35

Stadium Negara, Kuala Lumpur

== Final standing ==
Rank	Team	Record
1st place, gold medalist(s)	(China) Beijing Hanwei	6–0
2nd place, silver medalist(s)	(Hong Kong) Regal	4–2
3rd place, bronze medalist(s)	(Lebanon) Al-Riyadi Beirut	4–2
4	(South Korea) Hyundai Dynat	3–3
5	(Japan) Toshiba Red Thunders	4–1
6	(Malaysia) Petronas	2–3
7	(Uzbekistan) MHSK Tashkent	2–3
8	(Philippines) Beeper 150	1–4
9	(Indonesia) PanAsia Indosyntec	1–4
10	(Thailand) Bangkok Club	0–5

== Awards ==
- Most Valuable Player: (United States) Michael Cumberland (Al-Riyadi)
- Best Scorer: (United States) Bobby Parks (Beeper 150)
- Best Playmaker: (United States) Wayman Strickland (Regal)
- Sixth Man Award: (Lebanon) Elie Nasr (Al-Riyadi)
- Best Coach: (China) Li Xin (Hanwei) and (United States) Felton Sealey (Bangkok)
- Sportsmanship Award: (Malaysia) Teh Choon Yean (Petronas)
