= Beijing Olympians =

Now-defunct Chinese professional basketball team

- League: CBA 1999–2004; ABA 2005–09; WCPBL 2009–2010
- Founded: 1999
- Folded: 4 December 2013
- History: Aoshen Olympians; 1999–2013
- Arena: Don Bosco Technical Institute
- Location: Beijing
- Head coach: Lashun McDaniel
- Ownership: George Pickering

The Beijing Olympians or Beijing Aoshen Olympians or Beijing Aoshen (simplified Chinese: 北京奥神; traditional Chinese: 北京奧神; pinyin: běi jīng ào shén) was a Chinese professional men's basketball team that formerly played in the Chinese Basketball Association and the West Coast Pro Basketball League. They have also played in the American Basketball Association. Some sources refer to them (slightly ungrammatically) as the Beijing Olympicians. They should not be confused with the Beijing Ducks, which is a different team based in Beijing.

In the 2003–04 season, they finished 7th out of 12 teams in the CBA regular season, and were eliminated in the quarter-finals by the Jiangsu Dragons. They were disqualified from play for the 2004–05 season (see below), and although it was intended that they would return for the 2005–06 season, negotiations to rejoin the league broke down at the end of June 2005.

The Beijing Olympians joined the new American Basketball Association for the 2005–06 season and played in the Spencer Haywood Division of the Red Conference. In their inaugural season in the ABA they played their home games in Maywood, California rather than Beijing. In 2006–07, the team moved to the Felix Events Center at Azusa Pacific University, former home of the SoCal Legends, who switched their affiliation to the Continental Basketball Association, and relocated to Thousand Oaks. For the 2007–08 season, the team moved again, this time to Singapore. In 2008–09, the team moved back to California, this time to Don Bosco Technical Institute in Rosemead.

The Beijing Olympians was officially disbanded on 4 December 2013. The announcement did not come as a surprise after the club's owner, a Chinese real estate tycoon and billionaire named Li Su (simplified Chinese: 李苏; traditional Chinese: 李蘇; pinyin: lǐ sū; often referred to in the Western media as Winston Li), suddenly died in mid September due to acute myocardial infarction (Chinese: 急性心梗; pinyin: jí xìng xīn gěng) at the age of 55.

== History ==
For two seasons (1999–2000 and 2000–01) they were known as the Vanguard Aoshen (simplified Chinese: 前卫奥神; traditional Chinese: 前衛奧神; pinyin: qián wèi ào shén); this team represented a merger between Vanguard (simplified Chinese: 前卫万燕; traditional Chinese: 前衛萬燕; pinyin: qián wèi wàn yàn) and the then-existing Beijing Aoshen team. Occasionally the name Qianwei Aoshen was used instead (here, the word qianwei for "vanguard" is transliterated rather than translated). After that, however, the team used the Beijing Aoshen name once again.

The Vanguard team had a long history. It was founded in the 1950s and had some success over the years. The team played in the first CBA season in 1995–96, but finished last out of 12 teams and left the CBA. Meanwhile, the original Beijing Aoshen team was formed in 1997 as the Beijing Aosheng (simplified Chinese: 北京奥胜; traditional Chinese: 北京奧勝; pinyin: běi jīng ào shèng), and in 1998 won the "B" league championship to win promotion to the CBA. Soon after that they represented China in the Asian club championship, changing their name to Aoshen at the start of that competition, which they won (some Chinese media reports at the time incorrectly gave their name as the "北京奥盛").

The newly promoted Beijing Aoshen then made their CBA debut in the 1998–99 season. A key player on the team was Ma Jian (simplified Chinese: 马健; traditional Chinese: 馬健; pinyin: mǎ jiàn). In an unprecedented move, they hired a female head coach, Li Xin (Chinese: 李昕; pinyin: lǐ xīn), who thus became the first ever female head coach in the CBA, but she was fired after only five games and replaced by Mike McGee, a former player of the Los Angeles Lakers, who then became the first ever foreign head coach in the CBA. Aoshen finished fourth and lost in the semi-finals to the Bayi Rockets.

The following season, they merged with Vanguard, but struggled and finished sixth. In 2000–01 they continued to struggle: Ma Jian was dropped from the team in mid-season and they finished seventh. So far, they have never equaled their first-year performance.

=== 2004–2005 suspension ===
On May 17, 2004, the Beijing Olympians were suspended from the CBA for a year for refusing to release Sun Yue to the national under-20 team. On May 25, 2004, the CBA announced that the winner of the 2004 Chinese Basketball League (CBL) season would be promoted to the CBA to take the Olympians' place; that team turned out to be the Yunnan Bulls.

While under suspension from the CBA, Aoshen played a seven-game tour in Taiwan against each team of the SBL, sweeping all seven games.

=== 2005–2006 ===
It was intended that the Olympians would return to the CBA for the 2005–06 season, as the CBA expanded from 14 teams to 16, but negotiations broke down and the league only expanded to 15 teams.

As "Beijing Aoshen Olympian", they joined the new American Basketball Association for the 2005–06 season.

=== WCPBL ===
After the 2008–09 ABA season, it was announced that the Olympians would play in the West Coast Pro Basketball League for the 2009 season. Since the WCPBL was a spring basketball league, they continued playing in the winter based ABA.

== Notable players ==
- Ma Jian – first Chinese to play college basketball in the United States
- DeAngelo Collins
- Jevon Crudup
- Kevin Salvadori
- Roy Tarpley – Former NBA Sixth Man of the Year
- LeRon Ellis
- Jason Michael
- Kaniel Dickens
- Gabe Muoneke
- Paul Shirley – Former Iowa State and NBA player, and columnist for ESPN.com
- Fred Vinson – Former Georgia Tech and NBA player, and NBA assistant coach for the New Orleans Pelicans
- Sun Yue – 2008-09 NBA champion with the Los Angeles Lakers and two-time CBA champion with the Beijing Ducks
