= 1990 Asian Basketball Club Championship =

1990 FIBA Asia Champions Cup
4th Asia Champions Cup

Tournament details
- Host country: Indonesia
- Dates: 19–25 June
- Teams: 7
- Venue(s): 1 (in 1 host city)

Final positions
- Champions: China (2nd title)

The Asian Basketball Club Championship 1990 was the 4th staging of the Asian Basketball Club Championship, the basketball club tournament of Asian Basketball Confederation. The tournament was held in Jakarta, Indonesia from June 19 to June 25, 1990.

== Final standing ==
Rank	Team
1st place, gold medalist(s)	(China) Liaoning Hunters
2nd place, silver medalist(s)	(South Korea) Bank of Korea
3rd place, bronze medalist(s)	(Kuwait) Kazma
4	(Iran) Shahrdari Isfahan
5	(Hong Kong) Seasonal
6	(Indonesia) Halim
7	(Malaysia) Good Will
