= 1988 Asian Basketball Club Championship =

1988 FIBA Asia Champions Cup
3rd Asia Champions Cup

Tournament details
- Host country: Indonesia
- Dates: 9–16 April
- Teams: 7
- Venue: 1 (in 1 host city)

Final positions
- Champions: Philippines (2nd title)

The Asian Basketball Club Championship 1988 was the 3rd staging of the Asian Basketball Club Championship, the basketball club tournament of Asian Basketball Confederation. The tournament was held in Istora Senayan Stadium, Jakarta, Indonesia, April 9 to April 16, 1988.

== Preliminary round ==
Team	Pld	W	L	Pts
(Philippines) Swift-PABL	6	6	0	12
(China) Liaoning Hunters	6	5	1	11
(Malaysia) Pandan Jaya	6	4	2	10
(South Korea) Samsung Electronics	6	3	3	9
(Jordan) Orthodox	6	2	4	8
(Indonesia) Asaba	6	1	5	7
(Singapore) Armed Force	6	0	6	6

April 9

Swift-PABL (Philippines)	74–65	(Jordan) Orthodox

Istora Senayan Stadium, Jakarta

April 9

Pandan Jaya (Malaysia)	84–74	(South Korea) Samsung Electronics

Istora Senayan Stadium, Jakarta

April 9

Asaba (Indonesia)	52–88	(China) Liaoning Hunters

Istora Senayan Stadium, Jakarta

April 10

Swift-PABL (Philippines)	94–83	(Indonesia) Asaba

Istora Senayan Stadium, Jakarta

April 10

Orthodox (Jordan)	vs.	(Malaysia) Pandan Jaya

Istora Senayan Stadium, Jakarta

April 10

Liaoning Hunters (China)	vs.	(Singapore) Armed Force

Istora Senayan Stadium, Jakarta

April 11

Armed Force (Singapore)	79–116	(Philippines) Swift-PABL

Istora Senayan Stadium, Jakarta

April 11

Asaba (Indonesia)	75–83	(Malaysia) Pandan Jaya

Istora Senayan Stadium, Jakarta

April 11

Samsung Electronics (South Korea)	88–78	(Jordan) Orthodox

Istora Senayan Stadium, Jakarta

April 12

Swift-PABL (Philippines)	78–68	(China) Liaoning Hunters

Istora Senayan Stadium, Jakarta

April 12

Pandan Jaya (Malaysia)	102–84	(Singapore) Armed Force

Istora Senayan Stadium, Jakarta

April 12

Samsung Electronics (South Korea)	vs.	(Indonesia) Asaba

Istora Senayan Stadium, Jakarta

April 13

Liaoning Hunters (China)	87–66	(Malaysia) Pandan Jaya

Istora Senayan Stadium, Jakarta

April 13

Orthodox (Jordan)	104–69	(Indonesia) Asaba

Istora Senayan Stadium, Jakarta

April 13

Samsung Electronics (South Korea)	104–68	(Singapore) Armed Force

Istora Senayan Stadium, Jakarta

April 14

Armed Force (Singapore)	71–101	(Jordan) Orthodox

Istora Senayan Stadium, Jakarta

April 14

Pandan Jaya (Malaysia)	93–105	(Philippines) Swift-PABL

Istora Senayan Stadium, Jakarta

April 14

Liaoning Hunters (China)	65–52	(South Korea) Samsung Electronics

Istora Senayan Stadium, Jakarta

April 15

Asaba (Indonesia)	70–66	(Singapore) Armed Force

Istora Senayan Stadium, Jakarta

April 15

Orthodox (Jordan)	77–89	(China) Liaoning Hunters

Istora Senayan Stadium, Jakarta

April 15

Swift-PABL (Philippines)	106–93	(South Korea) Samsung Electronics

Istora Senayan Stadium, Jakarta

== Final round ==
=== 3rd place ===
April 16
18:00

Pandan Jaya (Malaysia)	66–88	(South Korea) Samsung Electronics

Istora Senayan Stadium, Jakarta

=== Final ===
April 16
20:30

Swift-PABL (Philippines)	84–69	(China) Liaoning Hunters
Scoring by half: 52–30, 32–39

Istora Senayan Stadium, Jakarta

== Final standing ==
Qualified for the 1989 Intercontinental Cup

Rank	Team	Record
1st place, gold medalist(s)	(Philippines) Swift-PABL	7–0
2nd place, silver medalist(s)	(China) Liaoning Hunters	5–2
3rd place, bronze medalist(s)	(South Korea) Samsung Electronics	4–3
4	(Malaysia) Pandan Jaya	4–3
5	(Jordan) Orthodox	2–4
6	(Indonesia) Asaba	1–5
7	(Singapore) Armed Force	0–6
