= Elie Mechantaf =

Lebanese basketball player (born 1970)

Personal information
- Born: 5 October 1970 (age 56) Beirut, Lebanon
- Listed height: 6 ft 5 in (1.96 m)
- Listed weight: 216 lb (98 kg)

Career information
- NBA draft: 1992: undrafted
- Playing career: 1987–2008
- Position: Forward
- Number: 13

Career history
- 1987–1993: EPA Larnaca
- 1993–1994: Club Riyadi Beirut
- 1994–2007: Hekmeh BC
- 2007–2008: Champville SC
- 2008: Hekmeh BC

Career highlights
- 1999 McDonald's World Championship 3rd best scorer and assister; Lebanese Basketball Championship MVP (Most Valuable Player); (1996–2002): Lebanon Cup MIP (most improved player); (2000–2003): Best Arab Player; (1997, 1999, 2001): FIBA Asian Cup Championship MVP (most valuable player); (2000, 2002): Asian MIP (most improved player); (2000): Best Asian Player; (1999–2001)

Elie Mechantaf (Arabic: إيلي مشنتف; born in Beirut, Lebanon on October 5, 1970) is a retired Lebanese professional basketball player.

He started his basketball career in the Cypriot Basketball League, before becoming the captain of the Lebanese Hekmeh BC (Sagesse) basketball club, winning the Lebanese Championship for 6 consecutive seasons from 1998 to 2004. Mechantaf was also the team captain of the Lebanon National Basketball Team from 2000 to 2006, also taking part in the 2002 FIBA World Championship in Indianapolis. He retired in 2008. Now Mchantaf is encouraging basketball in Lebanon through founding his own official club M13 (Mchantaf #13 ).

== Career ==
Mechantaf was born in Abra (East Saida), the son of Rafiq and Samia Mechantaf. He studied in the South in Saidoun High School, then moved to Beirut and later to Italy where he lived a year.

After graduation, he returned to Lebanon and became a player in Club Aamal Bikfaya in 1993. In 1994 he became the captain of Hekmeh BC (also known as Sagesse) dominating the Lebanese Basketball League winning FIBA Asia club championships.

The FLB (Federation Libanaise de Basketball) formed the Lebanese National Basketball Team, where Mechantaf started as the captain of the national side. Mechantaf took part in the 2002 Basketball World Cup in Indianapolis.

He was excluded from the national team in 2006 World Championship in Japan due to alleged doping.

He continued playing with Hekmeh until 2007, when he signed with Champville SC becoming the captain of the team. He returned to Hekmeh for a final season in 2008 before retiring.

== Records and accolades ==
- 1999 McDonald's World Championship 3rd best scorer and assister
- 1996-2002 Lebanese Basketball Championship MVP (most valuable player)
- 2000-2003 Lebanon Cup MIP (most improved player)
- 1996, 1998, 2000 Best Arab Player
- 1999, 2001 FIBA Asian Cup Championship MVP (most valuable player)
- 1999 Asian MIP (most improved player)
- 2000 Best player in Asia
- 1999, 2001 Best Asian Player
