= 2019 FIBA Asia Champions Cup =

28th edition of FIBA Asia Champions Cup

28th Asia Champions Cup

Tournament details
- Host country: Thailand
- Dates: 24 – 29 September
- Teams: 8
- Venue: 1 (in 1 host city)

Final positions
- Champions: Japan (Alvark Tokyo's 1st title; Japan's 1st title)

Tournament statistics
- Games played: 16
- MVP: (United States) Alex Kirk
- Top scorer: (United States) Kevin Murphy (27.6)
- Top rebounds: (South Korea) Ra Gun-ah (16.3)
- Top assists: (Chinese Taipei) Wen-Cheng Tsai (5.3)

Official website
- 2019 FIBA Asia Champions Cup

The 2019 FIBA Asia Champions Cup was the 28th staging of the FIBA Asia Champions Cup, the international basketball club tournament of FIBA Asia. The tournament took place in Thailand from 24 to 29 September 2019. Games were played at Stadium29 in Nonthaburi. Alvark Tokyo won their first title after losing in the final last year.

== Qualification ==
The following clubs qualified to the main tournament:

Team	Qualified as
(China) Guangdong Southern Tigers	Winners of the 2018–19 CBA season
(South Korea) Ulsan Hyundai Mobis Phoebus	Winners of the 2018–19 KBL season
(Japan) Alvark Tokyo	Winners of the 2018–19 B.League season
(Lebanon) Al Riyadi Beirut	Wild card
(Chinese Taipei) Fubon Braves	East Inter-Sub Zone qualifier
(Thailand) Hi-Tech Bangkok City	East Inter-Sub Zone qualifier
(Iran) Palayesh Naft Abadan	West Inter-Sub Zone qualifier
(Bahrain) Al-Muharraq	West Inter-Sub Zone qualifier

== Group phase ==
All times are local (UTC+07:00)

=== Group A ===
Pos	Team	Pld	W	L	PF	PA	PD	Pts	Qualification
1	(Iran) Palayesh Naft Abadan	3	3	0	224	192	+32	6	Final round
2	(Bahrain) Al-Muharraq	3	2	1	246	246	0	5	Final round
3	(Chinese Taipei) Fubon Braves	3	1	2	235	222	+13	4	Classification round
4	(Thailand) Hi-Tech Bangkok City	3	0	3	211	256	−45	3	Classification round

Source: FIBA
Rules for classification: 1) Tournament points; 2) Head-to-head results; 3) Head-to-head points difference; 4) Head-to-head points scored; 5) Overall points difference 6) Overall points scored; 7) Random draw

24 September
13:00

Box score

Palayesh Naft Abadan (Iran)	85–64	(Bahrain) Al-Muharraq
Scoring by quarter: 25–16, 24–17, 19–16, 17–15

Stadium 29, Nonthaburi

24 September
17:00

Box score

Hi-Tech Bangkok City (Thailand)	69–88	(Chinese Taipei) Fubon Braves
Scoring by quarter: 15–19, 26–18, 12–30, 17–21

Stadium 29, Nonthaburi

25 September
13:00

Box score

Fubon Braves (Chinese Taipei)	66–68	(Iran) Palayesh Naft Abadan
Scoring by quarter: 23–29, 11–11, 12–21, 20–7

Stadium 29, Nonthaburi

25 September
17:00

Box score

Al-Muharraq (Bahrain)	97–80	(Thailand) Hi-Tech Bangkok City
Scoring by quarter: 25–17, 33–13, 20–22, 19–28

Stadium 29, Nonthaburi

26 September
16:00

Box score

Fubon Braves (Chinese Taipei)	81–85	(Bahrain) Al-Muharraq
Scoring by quarter: 20–19, 14–20, 23–13, 24–33

Stadium 29, Nonthaburi

26 September
19:00

Box score

Palayesh Naft Abadan (Iran)	71–62	(Thailand) Hi-Tech Bangkok City
Scoring by quarter: 21–24, 16–9, 24–13, 10–16

Stadium 29, Nonthaburi

=== Group B ===
Pos	Team	Pld	W	L	PF	PA	PD	Pts	Qualification
1	(Lebanon) Al Riyadi Beirut	3	3	0	260	252	+8	6	Final round
2	(Japan) Alvark Tokyo	3	2	1	250	223	+27	5	Final round
3	(South Korea) Ulsan Hyundai Mobis Phoebus	3	1	2	264	258	+6	4	Classification round
4	(China) Guangdong Southern Tigers	3	0	3	228	261	−33	3	Classification round

Source: FIBA
Rules for classification: 1) Tournament points; 2) Head-to-head results; 3) Head-to-head points difference; 4) Head-to-head points scored; 5) Overall points difference 6) Overall points scored; 7) Random draw

24 September
15:30

Box score

Alvark Tokyo (Japan)	85–65	(China) Guangdong Southern Tigers
Scoring by quarter: 18–16, 19–13, 30–18, 18–18

Stadium 29, Nonthaburi

24 September
20:30

Box score

Ulsan Hyundai Mobis Phoebus (South Korea)	90–92 (OT)	(Lebanon) Al Riyadi Beirut
Scoring by quarter: 13–11, 26–25, 20–19, 21–25, Overtime: 10–12

Stadium 29, Nonthaburi

25 September
15:30

Box score

Al Riyadi Beirut (Lebanon)	77–75	(Japan) Alvark Tokyo
Scoring by quarter: 23–18, 16–11, 22–29, 16–17

Stadium 29, Nonthaburi

25 September
20:30

Box score

Guangdong Southern Tigers (China)	76–93	(South Korea) Ulsan Hyundai Mobis Phoebus
Scoring by quarter: 20–16, 17–23, 19–30, 20–24

Stadium 29, Nonthaburi

26 September
14:00

Box score

Alvark Tokyo (Japan)	90–81	(South Korea) Ulsan Hyundai Mobis Phoebus
Scoring by quarter: 26–22, 16–15, 27–24, 21–20

Stadium 29, Nonthaburi

26 September
21:30

Box score

Al Riyadi Beirut (Lebanon)	91–87	(China) Guangdong Southern Tigers
Scoring by quarter: 23–28, 22–14, 26–25, 20–20

Stadium 29, Nonthaburi

== Final round ==
Semifinals
28 September
(Iran) Palayesh Naft Abadan	73
(Japan) Alvark Tokyo	80
28 September
(Lebanon) Al Riyadi Beirut	100
(Bahrain) Al-Muharraq	88

Final
29 September
(Japan) Alvark Tokyo	98
(Lebanon) Al Riyadi Beirut	74
Third place game
29 September
(Iran) Palayesh Naft Abadan	81
(Bahrain) Al-Muharraq	69

=== Semifinals ===
28 September
15:30

Boxscore

Palayesh Naft Abadan (Iran)	73–80	(Japan) Alvark Tokyo
Scoring by quarter: 13–16, 17–22, 21–19, 22–23
Pts: Haddadi 29; Rebs: Haddadi, Kazemi 8 Asts: Davoudichegani, Khahbahrami 5 Eff.: Haddadi 38		Pts: Kojima 19; Rebs: Mačvan 10; Asts: Kojima 4 Eff.: Kojima, Mačvan 22

Stadium 29, Nonthaburi

28 September
18:00

Boxscore

Al Riyadi Beirut (Lebanon)	100–88	(Bahrain) Al-Muharraq
Scoring by quarter: 25–21, 20–30, 30–20, 25–17
Pts: Arakji 24; Rebs: Abdelnour 14; Asts: Arakji 7 Eff.: Arakji 32		Pts: Harris 34; Rebs: Harris 9 Asts: Murphy, Malabes 4 Eff.: Harris 38

Stadium 29, Nonthaburi

=== Third place game ===
29 September
15:30

Boxscore

Palayesh Naft Abadan (Iran)	81–69	(Bahrain) Al-Muharraq
Scoring by quarter: 30–25, 20–23, 17–12, 14–9
Pts: Davarpanah 31; Rebs: Kazemi 15; Asts: Davoudichegani 8 Eff.: Davarpanah 33		Pts: Murphy 19; Rebs: Murphy 11; Asts: Alderazi 9 Eff.: Alderazi 16

Stadium 29, Nonthaburi

=== Final ===
29 September
18:00

Boxscore

Alvark Tokyo (Japan)	98–74	(Lebanon) Al Riyadi Beirut
Scoring by quarter: 22–12, 25–14, 24–24, 27–24
Pts: Mačvan 20; Rebs: Kirk 12; Asts: Ando 7 Eff.: Mačvan 25		Pts: Ibekwe 31; Rebs: Abdelnour, Bawji 6 Asts: Warren 6 Eff.: Ibekwe 32

Stadium 29, Nonthaburi

== Final ranking ==
Rank	Team	Record
1st place, gold medalist(s)	(Japan) Alvark Tokyo	4–1
2nd place, silver medalist(s)	(Lebanon) Al Riyadi Beirut	4–1
3rd place, bronze medalist(s)	(Iran) Palayesh Naft Abadan	4–1
4th	(Bahrain) Al-Muharraq	2–3

== Awards ==
2019 FIBA Asia Champions Cup

Alvark Tokyo
1st title

Most Valuable Player
(United States) Alex Kirk

=== All-Star Five ===
Pos	Player	Club
G	(Japan) Daiki Tanaka	(Japan) Alvark Tokyo
G	(Lebanon) Wael Arakji	(Lebanon) Al Riyadi Beirut
G	(United States) Kevin Murphy	(Bahrain) Al-Muharraq
C	(United States) Alex Kirk (MVP)	(Japan) Alvark Tokyo
C	(Iran) Hamed Haddadi	(Iran) Palayesh Naft Abadan
