= 1992 Asian Basketball Club Championship =

1992 FIBA Asia Champions Cup
5th Asia Champions Cup

Tournament details
- Host country: Thailand
- Dates: 26 April–1 May
- Teams: 7
- Venue(s): 1 (in 1 host city)

Final positions
- Champions: South Korea (1st title)

The Asian Basketball Club Championship 1992 was the 5th staging of the Asian Basketball Club Championship, the basketball club tournament of Asian Basketball Confederation. The tournament was held in Bangkok, Thailand from April 26 to May 1, 1992.

== Final standing ==
Rank	Team
1st place, gold medalist(s)	(South Korea) Kia Motors
2nd place, silver medalist(s)	(China) Liaoning Hunters
3rd place, bronze medalist(s)	(Kuwait) Kazma
4	(Thailand) Thai Ruamsin
5	(Hong Kong) Seasonal
6	(Singapore) Asia Electric
7	(Malaysia) Johor Tigers
