= BC SKA Alma-Ata =

- League: Kazakhstan Basketball Championship
- Founded: 1978
- Dissolved: 2013
- History: BC SKA Alma-Ata (1978–2013); BC Almaty (2013–present)
- Location: Almaty, Kazakhstan

BC SKA Alma-Ata (Russian: баскетбольный клуб СКА Алма-Ата) was a former Soviet basketball club from the city of Alma-Ata. In 2013 the club has merged into BC Almaty to serve as the reserve squad in the second division Higher league under the name Almaty Legion KazNU (Russian: Алматинский Легион КазНУ)

== History ==
In 1978 in Alma-Ata (now Almaty) on the basis of the multi-sport society "SKA" (спортивный клуб Армии) created the eponymous basketball club. The team played in the lower leagues, up to 1985, when the team won the first league championship and promoted to the USSR Premier Basketball League. In the seasons 1988-89 and 1989-90 SKA held the final 4 of the Premier League. In the Open CIS Cup of 1991-92 the team began as the SKA, and in 1992 finish the league season already as "Zhulduz" and won the "silver" medal, against the champions of Spartak Leningrad. After the collapse of the Soviet Union, most of the staff of SKA, basketball players along with coach Oleg Kim, moved to Samara in Russia and immediately declared to the big leagues of the first championship of Russia in 1992 as CSK VVS Samara. The rest of the club under the name CSKA Almaty (ЦСКА Алмату) continued to play in the new formed Kazakhstan basketball leagues. In the 2009-10 season the club won the championship of Kazakhstan's second league, having won 24 games out of 24, had a right to play in the Premier League.

== Names through history ==
- 1978-1991 SKA Alma-Ata
- 1992-1993 Zhulduz
- 1993-2013 CSKA Almaty
- 2013-to present Almaty Legion KazNU
