= Petronas (basketball) =

Former Malaysian semi-professional basketball team based in Kuala Lumpur

- League: Malaysia Basketball League
- Founded: 1990
- Dissolved: 2001
- History: Petronas (1990–2001)
- CEO: Andy Zeng

The Petronas Basketball Team was a Malaysian semi-professional basketball team based in Kuala Lumpur. They competed in the now-defunct Malaysian Basketball League. The team was owned and sponsored by Petronas, a state-owned oil and gas company. Established in 1990, Petronas played many seasons in the FIBA Asia Champions Cup.

== Honours ==
- Malaysian Basketball League
  - Champions (7): 1995, 1996, 1997, 1998, 1999, 2000, 2001
- MBL Champions Cup
  - Winners (4): 2001, 2002, 2003, 2004

== Last roster ==
No.		Position	Player
	(Malaysia)	SF	Chen Jye Koo
	(Malaysia)	PG	Chze Hian Chai
	(Malaysia)	C	Francis Loh Hoo Won
	(Philippines)	SG	Disney Jay Gabonada
	(Malaysia)	SG	B. Guganeswarran
	(Malaysia)	PG	Han Sin Gan
	(Malaysia)	PF	John Ng Yeow Seng
	(Malaysia)	C	Chee Li Wei

No.		Position	Player
	(Malaysia)	PF	Kah Hau Hong
	(Australia)	C	Ben Knight
	(Malaysia)	C	Li Wei Chee
	(Malaysia)	PG	Loh Shee Fai
	(Malaysia)	PF	Loh Shee Hong
	(Nigeria)	C	Ode Ochefu Tom
	(Malaysia)	C	Yong Jing Kwan

Other team personnel

- (New Zealand) Andy Zeng (team manager)
- (Philippines) David Zamar (head coach)
