= 2022–23 Jordanian Premier Basketball League =

2022–23 JPL season
- League: Jordanian Premier Basketball League
- Duration: 26 December 2022 - 30 April 2023
- Teams: 6

Regular Season
- Season champions: Orthodox
- Runners-up: Al-Ahli
- Third place: Al-Riyadi Aramex

Finals
- Champions: Al-Ahli (25th title)
- Runners-up: Orthodox

Seasons
- ← 2021–22 2024–25 →

The 2022–23 Jordanian Premier Basketball League, also known as the CFI Premier Basketball League for sponsorship reasons, was the 69th season of the Jordanian Premier Basketball League (JPL), the top-tier competition for professional men's teams in Jordan. The season began on 26 December 2022 and ended on 30 April 2023.

Al-Ahli were crowned as champions, after defeating Orthodox in a 3-2 JPL Finals series. Al-Riyadi Aramex also finished in third-place of the competition.

Al-Wehdat were the defending champions, having won the previous 2021–22 season.

== Format ==
During the first round of the competition, six teams competed in a double round robin format, with each team playing home-and-away games against every other team.

The top four teams from the first round advanced to a second group stage, where they again competed in a double round-robin format of home and away matches.

The top three teams from the second round progressed to the third round, which was conducted as another double round-robin round. The two highest-ranking teams then qualified for the finals.

The finals were played as a best-of-five series, with the first team to win three games crowned as champion.

== Teams ==
6 teams competed in the competition, where Al-Riyadi Aramex and Al-Ashrafieh replaced previous champions Al-Wehdat and Al-Jalil.

2022–23 Jordanian Premier Basketball League season
Team	City	Arena	Coach	Capacity
Al-Ahli	Amman	Prince Hamza Hall		7,500
Al-Ashrafieh	Irbid	Al-Hassan Hall		2,000
Al-Jubaiha	Amman (Al Jubeha)	Prince Hamza Hall		7,500
Al-Riyadi Aramex	Amman	Prince Hamza Hall		7,500
Kafr Yuba	Irbid	Al-Hassan Hall		2,000
Orthodox	Amman	Prince Hamza Hall		7,500

=== Map ===
Location of clubs in Jordan for the 2022–23 Jordanian Premier Basketball League

== Regular season ==
Pos	Team	Pld	W	L	PF	PA	PD	Pts	Qualification
1	Orthodox	10	10	0	954	742	+212	20	Qualification to next round
2	Al-Ahli	10	8	2	1024	762	+262	18	Qualification to next round
3	Al-Riyadi Aramex	10	6	4	845	763	+82	16	Qualification to next round
4	Al-Jubaiha	10	3	7	733	812	−79	13	Qualification to next round
5	Kafr Yuba	10	2	8	597	896	−299	12	
6	Al-Ashrafieh	10	1	9	764	942	−178	11	

Updated to match(es) played on 28 January 2023. Source: Jordan Basketball Federation Asia-Basket

== Second round ==
Pos	Team	Pld	W	L	PF	PA	PD	Pts	Qualification
1	Orthodox	6	6	0	575	476	+99	12	Finals and qualification to next round
2	Al-Ahli	6	3	3	558	518	+40	9	Qualification to next round
3	Al-Riyadi Aramex	6	3	3	519	555	−36	9	Qualification to next round
4	Al-Jubaiha	6	0	6	443	546	−103	6	

Updated to match(es) played on 26 March 2023. Source: Jordan Basketball Federation Asia-Basket

== Third round ==
Pos	Team	Pld	W	L	PF	PA	PD	Pts	Qualification
1	Al-Ahli	4	3	1	365	304	+61	7	Finals
2	Al-Riyadi Aramex	4	3	1	361	344	+17	7	Third-place
3	Orthodox	4	0	4	293	371	−78	4	

Updated to match(es) played on 12 April 2023. Source: Jordan Basketball Federation Asia-Basket

== Finals ==
Team 1	Series	Team 2	Game 1	Game 2	Game 3	Game 4	Game 5
Orthodox	2–3	Al-Ahli	76–102	94–90	85–101	61–52	78–75

17 April 2023
22:00

Report

Orthodox	76–102	Al-Ahli
Scoring by quarter: 20–19, 25–33, 23–23, 8–27
Pts: C. Najdawi 25; Rebs: Hussein 8 Asts: Ibrahim 8		Pts: Z. Najdawi 37; Rebs: Z. Najdawi 14; Asts: Abu Hawwas 13

Prince Hamza Hall, Amman

19 April 2023
22:00

Report

Al-Ahli	90–94	Orthodox
Scoring by quarter: 22–26, 12–18, 30–24, 26–26
Pts: Abdeen 28; Rebs: Tarin 12; Asts: Qarmash 8		Pts: C. Najdawi 25; Rebs: Peterson 10; Asts: Ibrahim 10

Prince Hamza Hall, Amman

25 April 2023
18:00

Report

Orthodox	85–101	Al-Ahli
Scoring by quarter: 15–25, 22–25, 25–24, 23–27
Pts: Alhamarsheh 21; Rebs: Alhamarsheh 10; Asts: Alhamarsheh, Ibrahim 8		Pts: Abu Hawwas 30; Rebs: Z. Najdawi, Tarin 9 Asts: Abdeen 8

Prince Hamza Hall, Amman

27 April 2023
18:00

Report

Al-Ahli	52–61	Orthodox
Scoring by quarter: 14–15, 20–16, 7–15, 11–15
Pts: Z. Najdawi 20; Rebs: Z. Najdawi 16; Asts: Qarmash 6		Pts: C. Najdawi 18; Rebs: Hussein 19; Asts: Ibrahim 8

Prince Hamza Hall, Amman

30 April 2023
18:00

Report

Orthodox	75–78	Al-Ahli
Scoring by quarter: 20–25, 20–13, 19–23, 16–17
Pts: Hussein 23; Rebs: Hussein 19; Asts: Ibrahim 10		Pts: Z. Najdawi 28; Rebs: Tarin 13; Asts: Abu Hawwas, Z. Najdawi 5

Prince Hamza Hall, Amman

== Statistical leaders ==
=== Points ===
Pos	Player	Club	PPG
1	(United States) Terrence Joyner	Al-Ashrafieh	27.6
2	(Jordan) Amin Abu Hawwas	Al-Ahli	22.9
3	(United States) Gerard Tarin	Al-Ahli	21.6
4	(Guyana) Kevin Mickle	Al-Jubaiha	20.4
5	(Jordan) Freddy Ibrahim	Orthodox	19.8

Source: Asia-Basket

=== Rebounds ===
Pos	Player	Club	RPG
1	(Guyana) Kevin Mickle	Al-Jubaiha	11.5
2	(United States) Gerard Tarin	Al-Ahli	11.0
3	(Syria) Brandon Peterson	Orthodox	10.2
4	(Jordan) Zane Najdawi	Al-Ahli	9.6
5	(Jordan) Yousef Abuwazaneh	Al-Riyadi Aramex	9.4

Source: Asia-Basket

=== Assists ===
Pos	Player	Club	APG
1	(Jordan) Freddy Ibrahim	Orthodox	9.2
2	(Jordan) Malek Kanaan	Al-Riyadi Aramex	6.7
3	(Jordan) Fadi Qarmash	Al-Ahli	6.4
4	(Jordan) Amin Abu Hawwas	Al-Ahli	6.0
5	(Jordan) Mitri Boseh	Al-Jubaiha	5.7

Source: Asia-Basket

== Awards ==
All official awards of the 2022–23 JPL season.

=== Finals MVP ===
Pos.	Player	Team
SF	(Jordan) Zane Najdawi	Al-Ahli

=== Player of the Year ===
Pos.	Player	Team
PF	(United States) Gerard Tarin	Al-Ahli

=== Guard of the Year ===
Pos.	Player	Team
PG	(Cambodia) Darrin Dorsey	Orthodox

=== Forward of the Year ===
Pos.	Player	Team
PF	(United States) Gerard Tarin	Al-Ahli

=== Center of the Year ===
Pos.	Player	Team
C	(Jordan) Mohammad Hussein	Orthodox

=== Domestic Player of the Year ===
Pos.	Player	Team
SF	(Jordan) Zane Najdawi	Al-Ahli

=== Domestic Rising Star Player of the Year ===
Pos.	Player	Team
SF	(Jordan) Ahmad Hammouri	Al-Jubaiha

=== Most Improved Player of the Year ===
Pos.	Player	Team
PG	(Jordan) Fadi Qarmash	Al-Ahli

=== Import Player of the Year ===
Pos.	Player	Team
PF	(United States) Gerard Tarin	Al-Ahli

=== Coach of the Year ===
Pos.	Player	Team
M	(Jordan) Mo'tasem Salameh	Al-Ahli
