= 2025–26 Jordanian Premier Basketball League =

2025–26 JPL season
- League: Jordanian Premier Basketball League
- Duration: 15 December 2025 - 21 May 2026
- Teams: 8
- TV partner(s): JRTV; Jordan Sport via Facebook

Regular Season
- Finals champions: Amman United
- Runners-up: Al-Faisaly

Seasons
- ← 2024–25 2026–27 →

The 2025–26 Jordanian Premier Basketball League, also known as the CFI Premier Basketball League for sponsorship reasons, was the 71st season of the Jordanian Premier Basketball League (JPL), the top-tier competition for professional men's teams in Jordan. The season began on 15 December 2025 concluded on 21 May 2026.

Amman United were the defending champions of the competition, having won the previous season.

On 21 May 2026, Amman United were crowned as champions, after winning Game 5 of the JPL Finals against Al-Faisaly.

== Format ==
The first round of the tournament was held in a double round robin format in order to determine the positions of the teams, which would continue until 3 February 2026, where there would be a break until 22 March 2026, in order for the Jordan national basketball team to prepare for its 2027 FIBA Basketball World Cup qualification matches.

The second round began on 23 March 2026, with a three-game series between the following: first-placed versus eighth-placed, third-placed versus sixth-placed, then second-placed versus seventh-placed, and the fourth-placed versus fifth-placed team. The winner of the short series would advance to the third round.

The third round began on 2 April 2026, with another three-game series between the winners of the second-round.

The fourth and final round, the finalists compete for the Premier League title in a five-game series, to be held between 17 April and 21 May 2026, with the winner being crowned by winning three of the five games. This round was preceded by a third-placed match, to which both teams competed in a three-game series.

== Teams ==
Al-Faisaly, Al-Wehdat, and Inglizia were promoted from the Jordanian First Division League. Whereas Al-Ahli and Orthodox from the previous season did not participate in the competition.

The league ultimately increased from 7 teams in the previous season to 8 teams.

2025–26 Jordanian Premier Basketball League season
Team	City	Arena	Coach	Capacity
Al-Ashrafieh	Irbid	Al-Hassan Hall	(Jordan Basketball Federation) Abdel Salam Saleh	2,000
Al-Faisaly	Amman	Prince Hamza Hall	(Jordan Basketball Federation) Abdallah Abuqoura	7,500
Al-Jalil	Irbid	Al-Hassan Hall		2,000
Al-Jubaiha	Amman	Prince Hamza Hall	(Jordan Basketball Federation) Saif Al-Bitar	7,500
Al-Wehdat	Amman	Prince Hamza Hall	(Hellenic Basketball Federation) Antonios Doukas	7,500
Amman United	Amman	Prince Hamza Hall	(Japan Basketball Association) Makoto Mamiya	7,500
Inglizia	Amman	Prince Hamza Hall	(Jordan Basketball Federation) Haitham Tleib	7,500
Shabab Bushra	Irbid	Al-Hassan Hall	(Jordan Basketball Federation) Amjad Ajbarah	2,000

=== Map ===
Location of clubs in Jordan for the 2025–26 Jordanian Premier Basketball League

== Regular season ==
Pos	Team	Pld	W	L	PF	PA	PD	Pts
1	Amman United	14	13	1	1242	859	+383	27
2	Al-Faisaly	14	13	1	1298	981	+317	27
3	Al-Jubaiha	14	8	6	1062	1036	+26	22
4	Al-Wehdat	14	7	7	1111	1063	+48	21
5	Inglizia	14	6	8	1001	1003	−2	20
6	Al-Jalil	14	4	10	927	1183	−256	18
7	Al-Ashrafieh	14	3	11	928	1202	−274	17
8	Shabab Bushra	14	2	12	934	1176	−242	16

Updated to match(es) played on 8 February 2026. Source: Asia-Basket

=== Results ===
Home \ Away	ASH	FAI	JAL	JUB	WEH	AMM	ING	BSH
Al-Ashrafieh	—	55–96	76–54	61–77	71–95	50–93	60–57	62–76
Al-Faisaly	108–86	—	111–51	88–71	80–67	67–83	86–57	89–71
Al-Jalil	79–52	58–92	—	75–86	74–95	61–99	69–77	80–67
Al-Jubaiha	103–67	86–113	70–80	—	74–80	77–86	69–59	66–56
Al-Wehdat	95–84	90–93	74–66	68–71	—	58–64	93–101	85–61
Amman United	96–53	74–89	126–42	80–58	78–66	—	81–61	90–56
Inglizia	74–50	53–79	99–77	62–69	66–70	58–94	—	97–66
Shabab Bushra	99–101	79–107	59–61	61–85	80–75	63–98	40–80	—

Updated to match(es) played on 8 February 2026. Source: JBF
Legend: Blue = home team win; Red = away team win.

== Second round ==
The schedule of the second round was released on 17 March, with the winner of the three-game series advancing to the next round.

Team 1	Series	Team 2	Game 1	Game 2	Game 3
Amman United (1st placed team)	2–0	Shabab Bushra (8th placed team)	129–52	106–56	–

Team 1	Series	Team 2	Game 1	Game 2	Game 3
Al-Jubaiha (3rd placed team)	2–0	Al-Jalil (6th placed team)	92–84	84–72	–

Team 1	Series	Team 2	Game 1	Game 2	Game 3
Al-Faisaly (2nd placed team)	2–0	Al-Ashrafieh (7th placed team)	125–64	96–48	–

Team 1	Series	Team 2	Game 1	Game 2	Game 3
Al-Wehdat (4th placed team)	1–2	Al-Inglizia (5th placed team)	95–80	87–93	88–89

== Third round ==
Team 1	Series	Team 2	Game 1	Game 2	Game 3
Amman United (1st placed team)	2–0	Al-Jubaiha (3rd placed team)	112–100	94–88	–

Team 1	Series	Team 2	Game 1	Game 2	Game 3
Al-Faisaly (2nd placed team)	2–0	Al-Inglizia (5th placed team)	109–86	109–107	–

== Fourth round ==
=== Third place ===
Team 1	Series	Team 2	Game 1	Game 2	Game 3
Al-Jubaiha (3rd placed team)	1–2	Al-Inglizia (5th placed team)	87–91	92–83	85–89

=== JPL Finals ===
Team 1	Series	Team 2	Game 1	Game 2	Game 3	Game 4	Game 5
Amman United (1st placed team)	3–2	Al-Faisaly (2nd placed team)	70–105	116–102	90–101	107–89	88–77
