= 2021–22 Jordanian Premier Basketball League =

2021–22 JPL season
- League: Jordanian Premier Basketball League
- Duration: 27 December 2021 - 22 April 2022
- Number of teams: 6

Regular Season
- Season champions: Orthodox
- Runners-up: Al-Wehdat
- Third place: Al-Ahli

Finals
- Champions: Al-Wehdat (2nd title)
- Runners-up: Orthodox

Seasons
- ← 2020–21 2022–23 →

The 2021–22 Jordanian Premier Basketball League, also known as the CFI Premier Basketball League for sponsorship reasons, was the 68th season of the Jordanian Premier Basketball League (JPL), the top-tier competition for professional men's teams in Jordan. The season began on 27 December 2021 and ended on 22 April 2022.

Al-Wehdat were crowned as champions, after defeating Orthodox in a 3-0 JPL Finals series. Al-Ahli also finished in third-place of the competition.

Al-Ahli were the defending champions, having won the previous 2020–21 season.

== Format ==
During the first round of the competition, 6 teams competed in a double round robin format, with each team playing home-and-away games against every other team.

The top four teams from the first round advanced to a second group stage, where they again competed in a double round-robin format of home and away matches. There, teams get arranged from the 1st seed to the 4th seed.

"The Final" stage commences with the same 4 teams from the previous round, where teams play to a best-of-five series, with the first team to win three games crowned as champion.

== Teams ==
6 teams competed in the competition, with no changes made to the previous season.

2021–22 Jordanian Premier Basketball League season
Team	City	Arena	Coach	Capacity
Al-Ahli	Amman	Prince Hamza Hall		7,500
Al-Jalil	Irbid	Al-Hassan Hall		2,000
Al-Jubaiha	Amman (Al Jubeha)	Prince Hamza Hall		7,500
Al-Wehdat	Amman	Prince Hamza Hall		7,500
Kafr Yuba	Irbid	Al-Hassan Hall		2,000
Orthodox	Amman	Prince Hamza Hall		7,500

=== Map ===
Location of clubs in Jordan for the 2021–22 Jordanian Premier Basketball League

== Regular season ==
Pos	Team	Pld	W	L	PF	PA	PD	Pts	Qualification
1	Orthodox	10	9	1	870	705	+165	19	Qualification to next round
2	Al-Wehdat	10	8	2	841	591	+250	18	Qualification to next round
3	Al-Ahli	10	7	3	854	745	+109	17	Qualification to next round
4	Al-Jubaiha	10	3	7	765	806	−41	13	Qualification to next round
5	Kafr Yuba	10	3	7	745	905	−160	13	
6	Al-Jalil	10	0	10	633	956	−323	10	

Updated to match(es) played on 31 January 2022. Source: Jordan Basketball Federation Asia-Basket

== Second round ==
Pos	Team	Pld	W	L	PF	PA	PD	Pts	Qualification
1	Al-Wehdat	6	5	1	530	390	+140	11	Semi-finals 1
2	Orthodox	6	3	3	508	446	+62	9	Semi-finals 2
3	Al-Ahli	6	3	3	449	498	−49	9	Semi-finals 2
4	Al-Jubaiha	6	1	5	446	599	−153	7	Semi-finals 1

Updated to match(es) played on 25 March 2022. Source: Jordan Basketball Federation Asia-Basket

== The Final ==
=== Semi-finals ===
Team 1	Series	Team 2	Game 1	Game 2	Game 3	Game 4	Game 5
Al-Wehdat	3–0	Al-Jubaiha	91–52	85–74	76–68	–	–

29 March 2022
19:00

Report

Al-Wehdat	91–52	Al-Jubaiha
Scoring by quarter: 24–8, 28–7, 15–21, 24–16
Pts: Miles 23; Rebs: Abuwazaneh 14; Asts: Bustami, Miles 7		Pts: Magee 14; Rebs: Abuaboud 11; Asts: Ahmad, Abuaboud 4

Prince Hamza Hall, Amman

1 April 2022
19:00

Report

Al-Jubaiha	74–85	Al-Wehdat
Scoring by quarter: 11–0, 27–26, 14–21, 22–18
Pts: Magee 26; Rebs: Abuaboud, Magee 8 Asts: Kanaan 7		Pts: Miles 21; Rebs: Abuwazaneh 13; Asts: Abdeen 6

Prince Hamza Hall, Amman

5 April 2022
22:00

Report

Al-Wehdat	76–68	Al-Jubaiha
Scoring by quarter: 20–15, 17–15, 25–21, 14–17
Pts: Miles 24; Rebs: Miles 12; Asts: Abdeen, Miles 6		Pts: Magee 20; Rebs: Magee 22; Asts: Ahmad 8

Prince Hamza Hall, Amman

Team 1	Series	Team 2	Game 1	Game 2	Game 3	Game 4	Game 5
Orthodox	3–0	Al-Ahli	81–62	81–75	74–66	–	–

30 March 2022
22:00

Report

Orthodox	81–62	Al-Ahli
Scoring by quarter: 16–15, 12–19, 20–13, 33–15
Pts: Abu Hawwas 26; Rebs: Thomas 9 Asts: Abbas 10		Pts: Al-Awadi 21; Rebs: Alhamarsheh; Asts: Eid 5

Prince Hamza Hall, Amman

2 April 2022
19:00

Report

Al-Ahli	75–81	Orthodox
Scoring by quarter: 17–28, 9–21, 24–21, 25–11
Pts: Alawamleh 15; Rebs: Alhamarsheh 18; Asts: Alhamarsheh, Hassouneh 7		Pts: Abu Hawwas 32; Rebs: Thomas 14; Asts: Abu Hawwas 9

Prince Hamza Hall, Amman

6 April 2022
22:00

Report

Orthodox	74–66	Al-Ahli
Scoring by quarter: 16–23, 23–13, 23–12, 12–18
Pts: Abbas 33; Rebs: Thomas 13; Asts: Kanaan 8		Pts: Roach II 41; Rebs: Alawamleh 13; Asts: Alawamleh 3

Prince Hamza Hall, Amman

=== Third-place ===
Team 1	Series	Team 2	Game 1	Game 2	Game 3
Al-Jubaiha	0–2	Al-Ahli	73–92	72–103	–

=== Final ===
Team 1	Series	Team 2	Game 1	Game 2	Game 3	Game 4	Game 5
Al-Wehdat	3–0	Orthodox	95–92 (OT)	85–70	91–69	–	–

14 April 2022
22:00

Report

Al-Wehdat	95–92 (OT)	Orthodox
Scoring by quarter: 22–18, 20–22, 18–20, 22–22, Overtime: 13–10
Pts: Hussein 27; Rebs: Hussein 15; Asts: Miles 8		Pts: Abu Hawwas 32; Rebs: Thomas 10; Asts: Kanaan, Abbas 8

Prince Hamza Hall, Amman

19 April 2022
22:00

Report

Orthodox	70–85	Al-Wehdat
Scoring by quarter: 21–14, 22–20, 17–14, 17–30
Pts: Abu Hawwas 27; Rebs: Thomas 9 Asts: Abbas 6		Pts: Miles 27; Rebs: Abuwazaneh 9 Asts: Miles 12

Prince Hamza Hall, Amman

22 April 2022
22:00

Report

Al-Wehdat	91–69	Orthodox
Scoring by quarter: 17–18, 25–10, 32–17, 17–24
Pts: Hussein, Z. Najdawi, Miles 15; Rebs: Z. Najdawi, Miles 7 Asts: Miles 14		Pts: Abu Hawwas 25; Rebs: Abbas 10; Asts: Kanaan, Abbas 6

Prince Hamza Hall, Amman
