= Sport in Jordan =

Sport in Jordan is a key part of the country's culture. Three sports cities in Amman, Irbid and Zarqa, as well as thirteen sports complexes all around Jordan are dedicated to the youth and their participation in sports, providing a positive impact on Jordan's participation in Arab, regional and international competitions. That is especially the case in Jordan's most popular sports of football and basketball, where they participated in the most recent AFC Asian Cup final and the FIBA Basketball World Cup respectively.

Various other sports have positively contributed to the country's culture, such as martial arts and their mixed martial arts counterpart, horse riding, swimming, tennis, badminton, handball and volleyball. Rugby is also a sport growing in popularity.

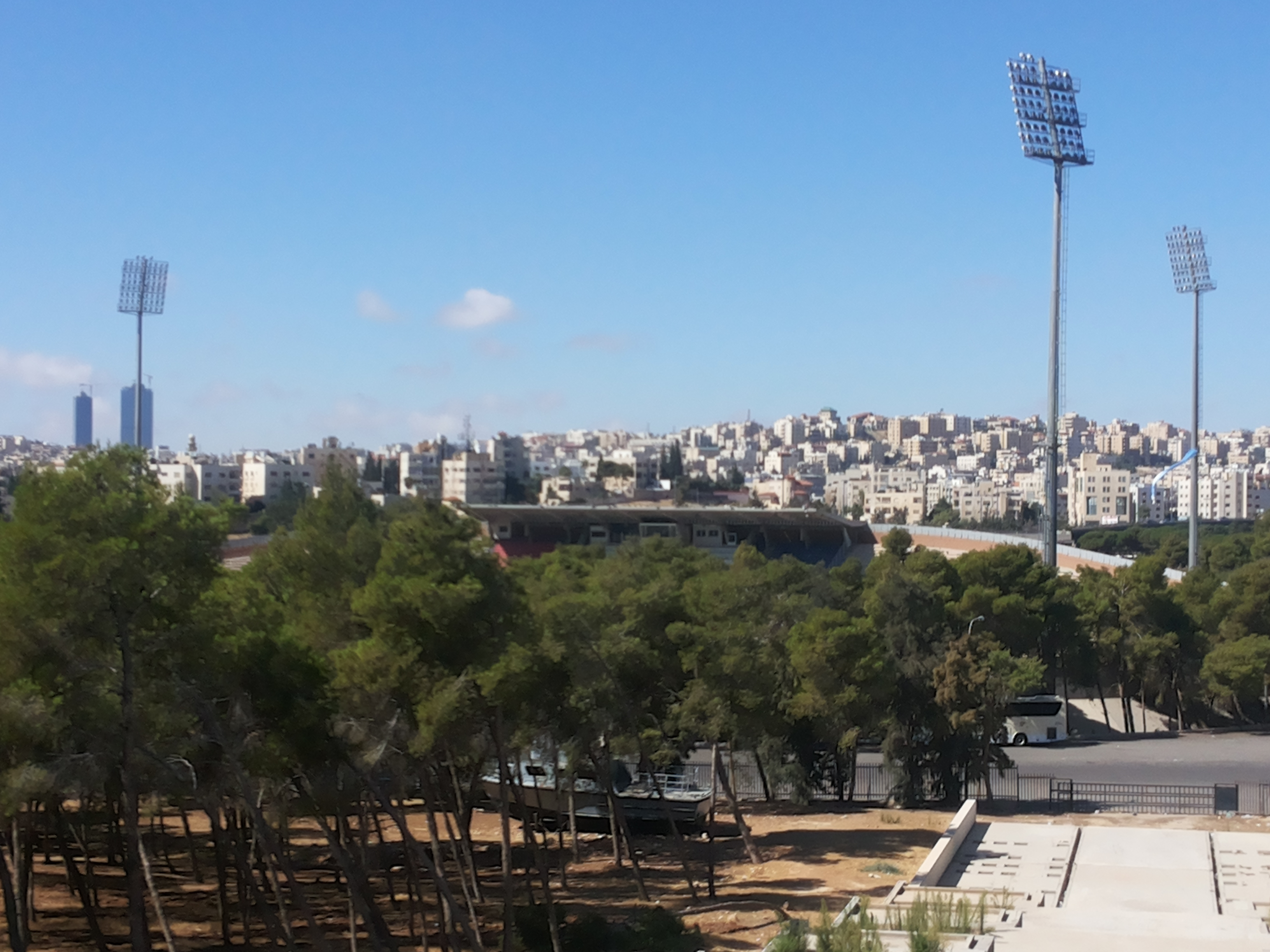
Amman International Stadium

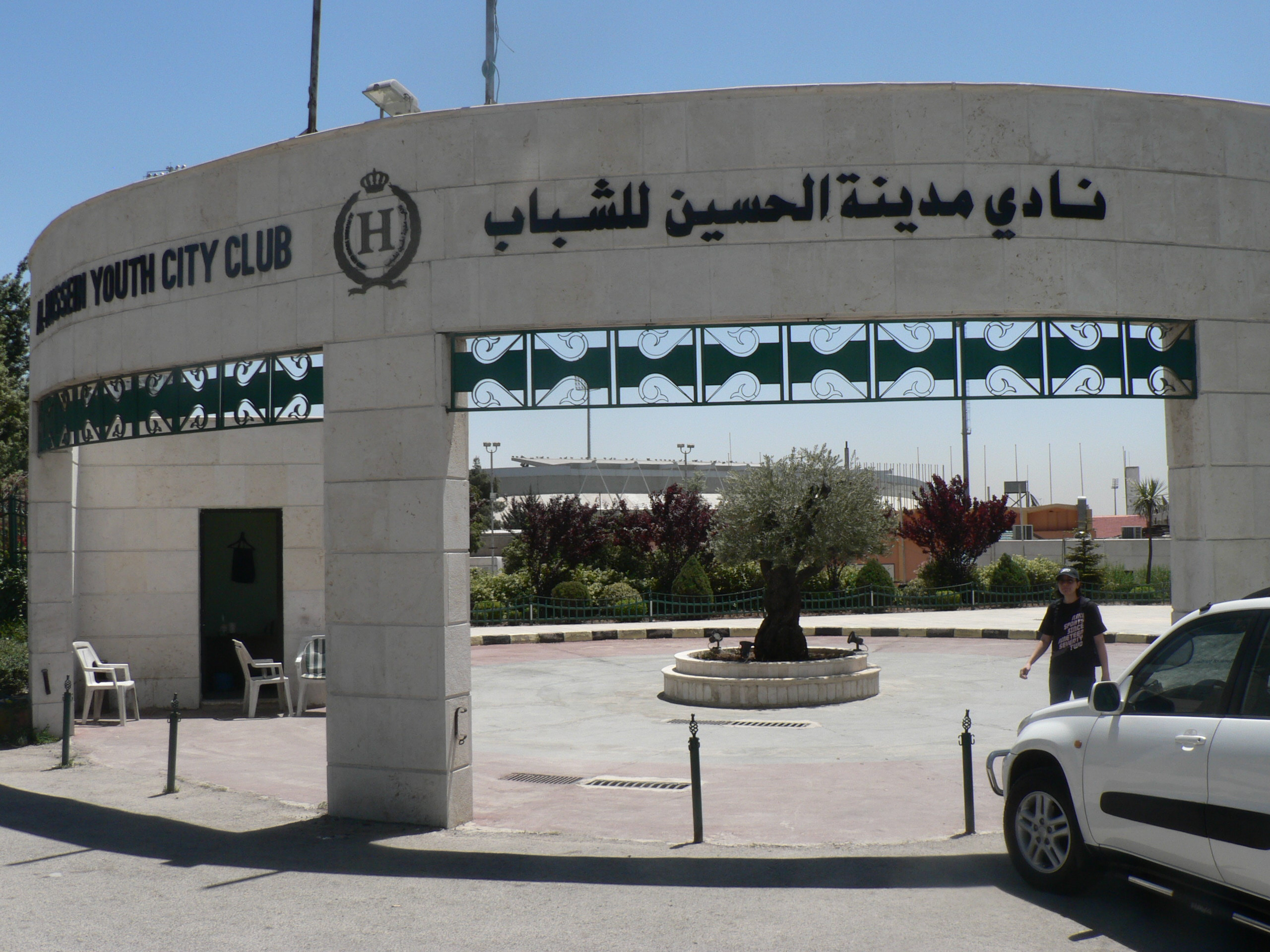
Entrance to the Al Hussein Youth City Club

== Football ==
Football is the most popular sport in Jordan.

The sport was introduced during the establishment of the Emirate of Transjordan by the British Armed Forces, who were present with the Arab army at the time. In 1926, Six-a-side football would be played between the Jordanian and British youth.

The first sports club founded was Jordan Club in 1928 and was limited to football.

1944 saw a new beginning for Jordanian football with the establishment of the General Sports Federation, which the month of April also saw the first iteration of the Jordanian League, as 4 teams participated in the inaugural competition. Al-Faisaly were the inaugural champions of the competition.

1949 saw the establishment of the Jordan Football Association, who were also one of the founding members of the Arab Football Association. The Jordan national football team played its first international match in 1953 against Syria, during a football tournament in Alexandria, Egypt. It would go on to become a FIFA member in 1958.

In terms of its recent history, the national football team reached 37th place in September 2004 according to the FIFA World Rankings, and finished as runners-up at the AFC Asian Cup in 2023.

== Basketball ==
=== International ===
Jordan is considered to have among the most competitive basketball teams in Asia and the Arab world.

The history of basketball in Jordan dates back to 1937, but started to gain traction when the Jordan Basketball Federation was formed in 1957. It joined FIBA in the same year, FIBA Asia in 1964 and the West Asia Basketball Association in 1998.

The 1980s and 1990s were seen as a golden age period in Jordanian basketball, with the men, women and youth national teams witnessing periods of growth.

The 2000s and 2010s also saw historical leaps to their basketball program, with players such as Zaid Abbas, Sam Daghles, Islam Abbas, Zaid Al-Khas and Mahmoud Abdeen became sought after internationally, after Jordan's qualification to the 2010 FIBA World Championship , the first time in national team history.

The late 2010s and 2020s would see players like former EuroLeague champion Ahmad Al-Dwairi, as well as the likes of Amin Abu Hawwas and Freddy Ibrahim lead Jordan as domestic players, with their subsequent qualifications to the 2019 FIBA Basketball World Cup and 2023 FIBA Basketball World Cup.

Notable naturalized Jordanian basketball players include Rasheim Wright, Dar Tucker and former McDonald's All-American and NBA player Rondae Hollis-Jefferson, who made headlines during the 2023 FIBA Basketball World Cup for his performances with Jordan.

On the women's side, former WNBA champion Natasha Cloud represented Jordan during the 2021 FIBA Women's Asia Cup in Amman, Jordan.

=== Club ===
The Jordanian Premier Basketball League is considered to be the main club competition in the country. Orthodox and Al-Ahli are considered to be the most prestigious basketball clubs in the country, with both having 25 league trophies each since its inception in 1952.

The 2000s saw clubs like Zain (Fastlink) and ASU compete for championships, each putting their marks in the Jordanian basketball scene.

More recently, Al-Wehdat earned recognition for their loyal fan base, in addition to two league titles, helping basketball grow further during that period. However, they have suspended operations since their title-winning 2021–22 season.

== Combat sports ==
=== Taekwondo ===
Taekwondo in Jordan has grown in popularity and earned a positive reputation, given its successes at the international stage. The martial art was introduced in 1973, after the Jordan Royal Guard requested two teams of taekwondo trainers from Taiwan to train their members in it as a sport of self-defense. Chion-Hwa Chen, who was one of the coaches present, decided not to leave Jordan and ended up becoming a Jordanian citizen, in addition to being credited as the godfather of taekwondo in Jordan. Today, taekwondo serves an important role in Jordan–South Korea relations.

Ahmad Abughaush made Jordanian Olympic history when he won Jordan's first ever Olympic medal, after defeating Russia's Aleksey Denisenko during the 2016 Summer Olympics – Men's 68 kg competition. He also received a hero's welcome, including the Jordanian Royal Family congratulating him, as well as being awarded 100,000 JD by the Jordan Olympic Committee, upon his return to Amman.

Saleh El-Sharabaty and Zaid Kareem have also earned Olympic silver medals at the 2020 and 2024 Summer Olympics, respectively.

=== Mixed martial arts ===
Mixed martial arts is a sport that is rapidly growing in Jordan. The country has played an important role in being one of the main hubs of MMA to the Middle East, prior to Abu Dhabi's deal with the UFC. Sami Al Jamal and his business partner Tarek Kalimat are credited towards finding the first martial arts academy in Jordan: Source MMA.

Desert Force Championship was an MMA promotion company based in Amman, which held most of the top-ranked Arab MMA fighters in the region at the time.

Ali AlQaisi made history by becoming the UFC's first fighter from Jordan. Jarrah Al-Silawi is another notable Jordanian MMA fighter, currently contracted with the Professional Fighters League. Other notable MMA fighters include Izzedine Al-Derbani, Jalal Al Daaja, Nawras Abzakh, Abdalrahman Alhyasat and Akhmed Fararzha.

=== Karate ===
Jordan has produced notable karate practitioners go through the ranks. Abdelrahman Al-Masatfa has had many achievements throughout his career, including three gold medals at the Asian Karate Championship, two silver medals at the Asian Games and a bronze medal at the 2020 Tokyo Olympics. Bashar Al-Najjar is another notable Jordanian karateka.

=== Boxing ===
Boxing appeared from the early beginnings of the Emirate of Transjordan through the hands of Turkish-Palestinian boxer Adib Kamal, who trained a group of boys and established the first boxing team in 1927. Boxing also made it Jordanian Olympic debut during the 1988 Summer Olympics, with Abidnasir Shabab being the representative that year.

Al-Baqa'a refugee camp is home to notable Jordanian boxers, including Mohammad Abu Jajeh, as well as Zeyad and Hussein Ishaish.

=== Brazilian jiu-jitsu ===
Brazilian jiu-jitsu has seen a more recent rise in Jordan. Samy Al Jamal, who spent 30 years in Brazil to become a black belt, is credited towards the growth of BJJ in Jordan.

Rana Qubbaj became the first Arab woman to win medals at IBJJF tournaments back in 2012.

Shadia Bseiso has practiced the sport and competed in the Abu Dhabi World Professional Jiu-Jitsu Championship, winning silver in the white belt 72kg category back in 2014. She would go on to pursue a professional wrestling career and sign a contract with the World Wrestling Entertainment.

=== Ju-jitsu ===
Yara Kakish is a notable Jordanian ju-jitsu practitioner, who won Jordan's first-ever medal by a woman during the 2018 Asian Games. Her husband Basel Fanous is also a ju-jitsu practitioner and has represented Jordan in international competitive events.

=== Wrestling ===
Jordan is currently building up experience in terms of wrestling. It hosted the 2024 U17 World Wrestling Championships.

== Handball ==
Handball was introduced to Jordan in 1959, when a group of Jordanian students introduced the sport from their time studying in the Arab Republic of Egypt. Between 1959 and 1960, the Ministry of Education adopted handball as part of its official annual championships, and by the end of 1960, Al-Ahli and Jordan Club formed handball teams. by 1961, the Jordan Handball Federation was formed. Princess Sumaya bint Hassan chaired the Federation's Board of Directors, during which she helped grow women's handball in Jordan.

Jordan Handball Federation itself is affiliated to various organizations, including the International Handball Federation, Asian Handball Federation, Jordan Olympic Committee, West Asian Handball Federation and the Arab Handball Federation. It is based in Amman.

The main handball league competition in Jordan is the Jordanian Handball League.

== Volleyball ==
Volleyball was first introduced to Jordan in 1938, where it was played around school playgrounds. Decades later, the country decided on forming the Jordan Volleyball Federation in 1961. It would go on to join the Asian Volleyball Confederation and the FIVB in 1971, as well as the Arab Volleyball Association in 1975.

== Rugby ==
Rugby is on the rise in Jordan. There are four clubs in Jordan: Amman Citadel Rugby Club,Nomads Rugby Club, Aqaba Sharks and Amman Saracens

Jordan Rugby Official Website
Amman Citadel Rugby Club Website

== Badminton ==
Badminton was introduced to Jordan in the early 1990s, with the Jordanian Association for Badminton being established in 1993.

== Gymnastics ==
=== Artistic gymnastics ===
Ahmad Abu Al-Soud is a prominent artistic gymnast who has won various medals at the World Artistic Gymnastics Championships, as well as represent Jordan at the Olympic games as their first ever gymnast representative.

== Tennis ==
The history of tennis in Jordan dates back to the late 1940s with a small number of men playing it at that time on the Rihani Court near the first roundabout, and on the Philadelphia Hotel Court opposite the Roman Theatre. then later in 1952 on the courts of the Amman Sports Club in Jabal Al-Taj. The 1960s would see Orthodox Club and their sand courts becoming a popular spot in Jordan. In the early 1970s, a number of tennis players moved to the newly established Hussein Youth City courts, and to the Royal Automobile Club courts.

What encouraged the spread of tennis in that era was the formation of special committees to sponsor this game in each of the Hussein Youth City Club headed by Dr. Abdul Fattah Al-Bustani for 14 years, and later headed by Talal Maher, and other similar tennis committees in each of the Royal Automobile Club and the Orthodox Club in Abdoun.

In 1980, the Jordan Tennis Federation would be formed. As a result, the sport of tennis began to spread widely and organized among youth and juniors on the six federation courts, which King Hussein bin Talal ordered to be established at his own expense, and with the continuous sponsorship of Queen Noor Al Hussein who used to practice this game, and on the courts of Al Hussein Youth City under the sponsorship of the late Issam Arida and his continuous support for this game, and later under the sponsorship of Fadi Zureikat. Tennis also spread on the courts of the Royal Automobile Club and the Orthodox Club in Abdoun, the courts of the Amra Hotel, the Crown Hotel, the Dunes Club courts, and the courts of the Al Hassan Sports City in Irbid under the sponsorship and interest of Mazen Hatamleh.

In addition to the expansion of the game, professional Jordanian, Arab and foreign coaches were appointed in most of these clubs, and they were credited with training young men and women. National teams were formed that began to participate in local, regional and international tournaments, especially the Davis Cup matches, some of whose regional tournaments were organized on the courts of the Jordanian Tennis Federation in Amman. A number of young men and women were also qualified to become tennis referees.

The 2020s began seeing Abdullah Shelbayh establishing himself as a rising star in the Arab tennis scene, training at the Rafa Nadal Academy and establishing a bond with Rafael Nadal.

== Shooting ==
Prince Muhammad bin Talal played an important role in the history of shooting in Jordan, when he established the Royal Jordan Shooting Club in 1973.

== Squash ==
The Jordan Squash Federation is one of the sports federations in Jordan, supervised by the Jordanian Olympic Committee, and is interested in developing the sport of squash in the Kingdom. The sport played a major part in terms of growing the Al-Hussein Youth City in Amman.

== Skateboarding ==
Skateboarding in Jordan started in 2001, when Mohammed Zakaria received a skateboard as a gift from a family friend, and formed a community of skating enthusiasts.

In December 2014, the 7Hills Skatepark in Amman would become Jordan's first skate park. The skate park has since given refugees a platform to express themselves.

== Cycling ==
Established in 1982, the Jordan Cycling Federation is the official body responsible for managing and developing the sport of cycling, as well as promote recreational cycling in Jordan.

== Polo ==
Polo was introduced to Jordan in 1933, with a military polo team being formed that year.

== Hockey ==
Hockey was introduced to Jordan in 1933.

== See also ==
- Jordan at the Olympics
- Jordan at the Paralympics
