= 2024–25 Jordanian Premier Basketball League =

2024–25 JPL season
- League: Jordanian Premier Basketball League
- Duration: 12 December 2024 - 19 May 2025
- Number of teams: 7
- TV partner(s): JRTV; Jordan Sport via Facebook

Regular Season
- Finals champions: Amman United (1st title)
- Runners-up: Al-Ahli

Seasons
- ← 2022–23 2025–26 →

The 2024–25 Jordanian Premier Basketball League, also known as the CFI Premier Basketball League for sponsorship reasons, was the 70th season of the Jordanian Premier Basketball League (JPL), the top-tier competition for professional men's teams in Jordan. The season began on 12 December 2024 and ended on 19 May 2025.

Amman United were crowned as champions for the first time in team history, after defeating Al-Ahli in a 3-1 JPL Finals series. Al-Jubaiha also finished in third-place of the competition.

Al-Ahli were the defending champions, having won the previous 2022–23 season.

== Format ==
During the first round of the competition, 7 teams compete in a double round robin format, with each team playing home-and-away games against every other team.

The teams that finish in 5th, 6th, and 7th place at the conclusion of the first round will play at the second round, with a single round-robin series to determine their final rankings. There, the 6th and 7th placed teams play a single match, and the winner will meet the 5th placed team. The winner of that match then advances to the third stage.

The top four teams from the first round and the single team from the second round gets to advance in a second group stage, referred to as the third round, where they again compete in a double round-robin format of home and away matches.

The top four teams from the third round progress to the fourth round, which will consist of another double round-robin, aiming to arrange the positions of the remaining teams. The two highest-ranking teams qualify for the finals, while the third and fourth placed teams play for a third-placed match.

The finals are played as a best-of-five series, with the first team to win three games crowned the champion.

== Teams ==
There were initial plans of 8 teams participating in the league by December 12. However, 7 teams will end up participating in the competition.

Amman United, Al-Jalil and Shabab Bushra were added to the competition, while Al-Wehdat, Kafr Yuba, Al-Mokawloon, Gaza Hashem and other basketball clubs were not interested in participating in the competition.

Al Riyadi Aramex had originally planned on participating, but will instead not participate in the competition.

The league ultimately increased from 6 to 7 teams from the previous season.

2024–25 Jordanian Premier Basketball League season
Team	City	Arena	Coach	Capacity
Al-Ahli	Amman	Prince Hamza Hall	(Jordan) Zaid Al-Khas	6,000
Al-Ashrafieh	Irbid	Al-Hassan Hall	(Jordan) Nihad Madi	2,000
Al-Jalil	Irbid	Al-Hassan Hall	(Jordan) Abdel Salam Saleh	2,000
Al-Jubaiha	Amman (Al Jubeha)	Prince Hamza Hall	(Jordan) Mohammad Hadrab	6,000
Amman United	Amman	Prince Hamza Hall	(Jordan) Abdallah Abuqoura	6,000
Orthodox	Amman	Prince Hamza Hall	(Jordan) Zaid Al-Sahouri	6,000
Shabab Bushra	Irbid	Al-Hassan Hall	(Jordan) Amjad Ajbarah	2,000

=== Map ===
Location of clubs in Jordan for the 2024–25 Jordanian Premier Basketball League

== Regular season ==
Pos	Team	Pld	W	L	PF	PA	PD	Pts	Qualification
1	Amman United	12	12	0	1175	786	+389	24	Third round
2	Orthodox	12	8	4	911	903	+8	20	Third round
3	Al-Ahli	12	7	5	924	884	+40	19	Third round
4	Al-Ashrafieh	12	6	6	864	894	−30	18	Third round
5	Al-Jubaiha	12	6	6	822	820	+2	18	Second round
6	Shabab Bushra	12	3	9	830	969	−139	15	Second round
7	Al-Jalil	12	0	12	833	1103	−270	12	Second round

Updated to match(es) played on 27 January 2025. Source: Asia-Basket

=== Results ===
Home \ Away	ALA	ASH	JAL	JUB	AMM	ORT	BSH
Al-Ahli	—	80–64	107–77	75–64	61–101	80–90	72–54
Al-Ashrafieh	—	—	80–64	52–63	92–56	70–51	102–62
Al-Jalil	78–96	66–68	—	79–55	93–124	85–103	59–67
Al-Jubaiha	82–77	73–89	67–58	—	55–69	53–56	78–67
Amman United	103–68	116–74	127–52	83–65	—	96–77	88–62
Orthodox	58–56	85–82	103–76	—	62–76	—	67–85
Shabab Bushra	74–82	72–88	82–70	68–75	61–100	76–88	—

Updated to match(es) played on 27 January 2025. Source: JBF
Legend: Blue = home team win; Red = away team win.

== Second round ==
31 January 2025
17:00

Shabab Bushra (6th placed team)	90–86	Al-Jalil (7th placed team)

Al-Hassan Hall

4 February 2025
18:00

Al-Jubaiha (5th placed team)	84–66	Shabab Bushra (6th placed team)

Prince Hamza Hall

== Third round ==
Pos	Team	Pld	W	L	PF	PA	PD	Pts	Qualification
1	Amman United	8	8	0	791	583	+208	16	Final Four
2	Orthodox	8	5	3	632	651	−19	13	Final Four
3	Al-Ahli	8	4	4	680	616	+64	12	Final Four
4	Al-Jubaiha	8	2	6	567	642	−75	10	Final Four
5	Al-Ashrafieh	8	1	7	541	719	−178	9	

Updated to match(es) played on 15 April 2025. Source: Asia-Basket

=== Results ===
Home \ Away	ALA	ASH	JUB	AMM	ORT
Al-Ahli	—	78–83	78–69	81–92	77–93
Al-Ashrafieh	59–99	—	76–79	54–107	73–80
Al-Jubaiha	65–100	79–59	—	69–78	68–73
Amman United	90–87	116–70	99–61	—	106–80
Orthodox	65–80	81–67	79–77	81–103	—

Updated to match(es) played on 15 April 2025. Source: JBF
Legend: Blue = home team win; Red = away team win.

== Final Four ==
Pos	Team	Pld	W	L	PF	PA	PD	Pts	Qualification
1	Al-Ahli	6	4	2	531	487	+44	10	JPL Finals
2	Amman United	6	4	2	525	493	+32	10	JPL Finals
3	Orthodox	6	4	2	548	517	+31	10	Third place
4	Al-Jubaiha	6	0	6	457	564	−107	6	Third place

Updated to match(es) played on 7 May 2025. Source: Asia-Basket

=== Results ===
Home \ Away	ALA	JUB	AMM	ORT
Al-Ahli	—	87–57	77–72	95–98
Al-Jubaiha	85–92	—	84–93	72–96
Amman United	85–77	102–85	—	93–84
Orthodox	90–103	94–74	86–80	—

Updated to match(es) played on 7 May 2025. Source: JBF
Legend: Blue = home team win; Red = away team win.

== Third place ==
Team 1	Series	Team 2	Game 1	Game 2	Game 3
Orthodox	0–2	Al-Jubaiha	62–79	65–78	–

== JPL Finals ==
Team 1	Series	Team 2	Game 1	Game 2	Game 3	Game 4	Game 5
Al-Ahli	1–3	Amman United	69–64	71–77	68–82	70–88	–
