= Jordan men's national basketball team =

Jordanian Basketball Team

Jordan
- FIBA ranking: 41 (1 September 2026)
- Joined FIBA: 1957
- FIBA zone: FIBA Asia
- National federation: JBF
- Coach: Roy Rana

FIBA World Cup
- Appearances: 3

FIBA Asia Cup
- Appearances: 17
- Medals: Silver: (2011); Bronze: (2009)
Home	Away
Medal record
Event	1st	2nd	3rd
FIBA Asia Championship	0	1	1
FIBA Asia Challenge	1	0	1
Asian Games	0	1	0
Total	1	2	2

The Jordan national basketball team is the official basketball team of Jordan in international competitions.

The Jordanian team achievements in recent years beside qualifying to World Cup for three times (2010, 2019 and 2023), won the William Jones Cup in 2007 and 2008 and FIBA Asia Stankovic cup in Kuwait in 2008, finishing at the first place of Arab Nations cup in Egypt in 2007, and runners up in 2008, runners up at 2011 FIBA Asia Championship and 3rd place in 2009 FIBA Asia Championship, and finally 3rd place in 2016 FIBA Asia Challenge.

Jordan qualified for FIBA World Cup three times in history, making them the third best Arab team by National team appearances in the FIBA Basketball World Cup.

== History ==
=== William Jones Cup ===
Jordan became the first West Asia team to win the Jones Cup after posting a 7–2 record in the tournament to beat Lebanon and the Philippines.

=== 2007 FIBA Asia championship ===
The Jordanians placed fifth after beating Chinese Taipei. A member of the University of Minnesota basketball team, guard/forward Jamal Abu-Shamala, is Jordanian-American.

== Results ==
=== World Cup ===
FIBA World Cup Record
Year	Position	Pld	W	L	Squad
(Argentina) 1950 – (Colombia) 1982	did not enter				
(Spain) 1986 – (Japan) 2006	did not qualify				
(Turkey) 2010	Preliminary round	5	0	5	Squad
(Spain) 2014	did not qualify				
(China) 2019	Classification round	5	1	4	Squad
(Philippines) (Japan) (Indonesia) 2023	Classification round	5	0	5	Squad
(Qatar) 2027	To be determined				
(France) 2031	To be determined				
Total	3/21	15	1	14	

=== FIBA Asia Cup ===
Year	Rank	M	W	L
(Philippines) 1960	did not enter			
(Taiwan) 1963	did not enter			
(Malaysia) 1965	did not enter			
(South Korea) 1967	did not enter			
(Thailand) 1969	did not enter			
(Japan) 1971	did not enter			
(Philippines) 1973	did not enter			
(Thailand) 1975	did not enter			
(Malaysia) 1977	did not enter			
(Japan) 1979	did not enter			
(India) 1981	did not enter			
(Hong Kong) 1983	8th place	6	4	2
(Malaysia) 1985	9th place	6	4	2
(Thailand) 1987	10th place	6	3	3
(China) 1989	did not enter			
(Japan) 1991	8th place	9	3	6
(Indonesia) 1993	9th place	7	5	2
(South Korea) 1995	17th place	6	2	4
(Saudi Arabia) 1997	7th place	7	3	4
(Japan) 1999	did not qualify			
(China) 2001	did not qualify			
(China) 2003	10th place	7	3	4
(Qatar) 2005	7th place	8	3	5
(Japan) 2007	5th place	8	5	3
(China) 2009	3rd place	9	7	2
(China) 2011	Runners-up	9	5	4
(Philippines) 2013	7th place	9	4	5
(China) 2015	9th place	8	5	3
(Lebanon) 2017	8th place	7	3	4
(Indonesia) 2022	4th place	7	4	3
(Saudi Arabia) 2025	11th place	4	1	3
2029	To be determined			
Total	17/31	123	64	59

=== Asian Games ===
- 1951–82: Did not enter
- 1986: 4th
- 1990–2002: Did not enter
- 2006: 4th
- 2010: 7th
- 2014: 9th
- 2018: Did not enter
- 2022: (silver)
- 2026: 7th

=== Pan Arab Games ===
- 1953 – (bronze)
- 1985 – (gold)
- 1992 – (silver)
- 1999 – (silver)
- 2007 – (silver)
- 2011 – (silver)

== Results and fixtures ==
Win Loss

=== 2024 ===
23 February 2025 FIBA Asia Cup qualifiers	Jordan	73–46	Palestine	Amman, Jordan
20:00 (UTC+3)	Scoring by quarter: 16–16, 18–10, 25–4, 14–16
	Pts: Al-Dwairi 13; Rebs: Al-Dwairi 13; Asts: Ibrahim 7	Report	Pts: Mayali 20; Rebs: Godfrey 11; Asts: Mayali 3	Arena: Prince Hamza Hall; Attendance: 3,000; Referees: Alexey Stepanenko (KAZ), Rakesh Ramalingaiah (IND), Budi Marfan (INA)

26 February 2025 FIBA Asia Cup qualifiers	Saudi Arabia	64–79	Jordan	Jeddah, Saudi Arabia
19:30 (UTC+3)	Scoring by quarter: 18–16, 20–23, 11–20, 15–20
	Pts: Alsuwailem 17; Rebs: Alsuwailem 9 Asts: Belal 4	Report	Pts: Ibrahim 24; Rebs: Hollis-Jefferson 8 Asts: Ibrahim 6	Arena: King Abdullah Sports City; Attendance: 1,200; Referees: Paul Skayem (LBN), Hadi Salem (IRI), Sadegh Ghanbari Damanab (IRI)

22 November 2025 FIBA Asia Cup qualifiers	Jordan	73–64	Iraq	Amman, Jordan
19:00 (UTC+3)	Scoring by quarter: 23–18, 13–21, 19–7, 18–18
	Pts: Tucker 17; Rebs: Al-Dwairi, Ibrahim 10; Asts: Al-Dwairi 4	Report	Pts: Al-Zuhairi 13; Rebs: Al-Zuhairi 11; Asts: Mayfield 7	Arena: Prince Hamza Hall; Attendance: 4,227; Referees: Harja Jaladri (INA), Issam Al Siyabi (OMA), Rakesh Ramalingaiah (IND)

25 November 2025 FIBA Asia Cup qualifiers	Palestine	81–87	Jordan	Jeddah, Saudi Arabia
14:45 (UTC+3)	Scoring by quarter: 22–24, 12–24, 16–25, 31–14
	Pts: Halums 35; Rebs: Halums 7 Asts: Halums 7	Report	Pts: Abu Hawwas 23; Rebs: Al-Dwairi 14; Asts: Ibrahim 8	Arena: King Abdullah Sports City; Attendance: 50; Referees: Alexey Stepanenko (KAZ), Sadegh Ghanbari Damanab (IRI), Sergio Kassab (LBN)

=== 2025 ===
21 February 2025 FIBA Asia Cup qualifiers	Jordan	78–68	Saudi Arabia	Amman, Jordan
19:00 (UTC+3)	Scoring by quarter: 31–16, 19–20, 18–10, 10–22
	Pts: Abu Hawwas 22; Rebs: Al-Dwairi 11; Asts: Ibrahim 10	Report	Pts: Al-Muwallad 22; Rebs: Al-Suwailem 9 Asts: Abdurrahkman 5	Arena: Prince Hamza Hall; Attendance: 2,920; Referees: Paul Skayem (LBN), Hadi Salem (IRI), Sergio Kassab (LBN)

24 February 2025 FIBA Asia Cup qualifiers	Iraq	67–73	Jordan	Baghdad, Iraq
19:00 (UTC+3)	Scoring by quarter: 29–13, 15–20, 13–18, 10–22
	Pts: Mayfield 30; Rebs: Zewki 8 Asts: Mayfield 6	Report	Pts: Ibrahim 23; Rebs: Hamarsheh, Tucker 9 Asts: Tucker 6	Arena: Al-Shaab Hall; Attendance: 1,200; Referees: Ahmed Al-Bulushi (OMA), Taha Al-Hashedi (YEM), Issam Al-Siyabi (OMA)

5 August 2025 FIBA Asia Cup	Jordan	91–84(OT)	India	Jeddah, Saudi Arabia
14:00	Scoring by quarter: 18–14, 20–24, 22–17, 20–25, Overtime: 11–4
	Pts: Tucker 30; Rebs: Abbas, Ibrahim 7 Asts: Ibrahim 6	Report	Pts: Muthu Krishnan 14; Rebs: Prince 7 Asts: Prince 5	Arena: King Abdullah Sports City; Attendance: 175; Referees: Scott Beker (AUS), Ahmed Al-Bulushi (OMA), Preeda Muongmee (THA)

7 August 2025 FIBA Asia Cup	Saudi Arabia	77–73	Jordan	Jeddah, Saudi Arabia
21:00	Scoring by quarter: 21–17, 27–14, 19–22, 10–20
	Pts: Abdur-Rahkman 25; Rebs: Al-Suwailem 15; Asts: Abdel Gabar, Abdur-Rahkman 7	Report	Pts: Al-Hamarsheh, Ibrahim 19; Rebs: Tucker 8 Asts: Ibrahim 5	Arena: King Abdullah Sports City; Attendance: 4,352; Referees: Yevgeniy Mikheyev (KAZ), Wissam Zein (SYR), Preeda Muongmee (THA)

9 August 2025 FIBA Asia Cup	China	vs.	Jordan	Jeddah, Saudi Arabia
14:00
		Boxscore		Arena: King Abdullah Sports City

== Team ==
=== Current roster ===
Roster for the 2025 FIBA Asia Cup.

Jordan men's national basketball team – 2025 FIBA Asia Cup roster
Players
Coaches

Pos.	No.	Name	Age – Date of birth	Height	Club	Ctr.
G	0	Abdullah Olajuwon	21 – 11 February 2004	1.96 m (6 ft 5 in)	Kilgore	(United States)
SG	2	Dar Tucker (NP)	37 – 11 April 1988	1.90 m (6 ft 3 in)	Free agent
F	3	Abdul Rahman Olajuwon	19 – 18 December 2005	2.03 m (6 ft 8 in)	Tyler	(United States)
PG	5	Freddy Ibrahim	28 – 14 October 1996	1.90 m (6 ft 3 in)	Orthodox Club	(Jordan)
SF	7	Ahmad Al-Hamarsheh (C)	38 – 10 October 1986	1.96 m (6 ft 5 in)	Al-Wehdat	(Jordan)
G	11	Yazan Al Taweel	31 – 7 August 1993	1.90 m (6 ft 3 in)	Kafr Yuba	(Jordan)
C	12	Yousef Abu Wazaneh	31 – 6 December 1993	2.00 m (6 ft 7 in)	Orthodox Club	(Jordan)
C	14	Khaled Abu Aboud	28 – 22 May 1997	2.02 m (6 ft 8 in)	Kafr Yuba	(Jordan)
SF	17	Rawhi Kilani	18 – 25 August 2006	1.90 m (6 ft 3 in)	Amman United	(Spain)
SF	21	Hashem Abbas	26 – 30 March 1999	1.90 m (6 ft 3 in)	Al-Ahli	(Jordan)
PG	22	Malek Kannan	32 – 7 February 1993	1.85 m (6 ft 1 in)	Al-Ahli	(Jordan)
C	31	Faris Mucharbach	19 – 30 July 2006	2.12 m (6 ft 11 in)	UNLV Runnin' Rebels	(United States)

Head coach

- (Canada) Roy Rana

Assistant coach(es)

- (Jordan) Nayef Asfour
- (Germany) Henrik Rödl

Legend

- (C) Team captain
- (NP) Naturalized player
- Club – describes last
  club before the tournament
- Age – describes age
  on 5 August 2025

=== Current coaching staff ===
As of 13 July 2025

Position	Name
Sr. Director of Basketball Operations; Head coach	(Canada) Roy Rana
Lead Assistant coach	(Germany) Henrik Rödl
Assistant coach / Chief of staff coach	(Japan) Makoto Mamiya
Performance director coach	(Canada) Dr. Craig Slaunwhite
Performance psychologist	(Canada) Dr. Brian Shaw

=== Past rosters ===
Roster for the 2023 FIBA Basketball World Cup.

Jordan national basketball team – 2023 FIBA Basketball World Cup roster
Players
Coaches

Pos.	No.	Name	Age – Date of birth	Height	Club	Ctr.
SG	1	Amin Abu Hawwas	29 – 26 April 1994	1.94 m (6 ft 4 in)	Al-Ahli	(Jordan)
PG	5	Freddy Ibrahim	26 – 14 October 1996	1.90 m (6 ft 3 in)	Orthodox BC	(Jordan)
SF	7	Ahmad Al-Hamarsheh	36 – 10 October 1986	1.96 m (6 ft 5 in)	Orthodox BC	(Jordan)
SG	9	Sami Bzai	29 – 26 January 1994	1.90 m (6 ft 3 in)	Al-Ahli	(Jordan)
G	11	Ahmad Hammouri	20 – 15 July 2003	1.90 m (6 ft 3 in)	Al-Jubaiha SC	(Jordan)
C	13	Mohammad Hussein	33 – 3 March 1990	2.12 m (6 ft 11 in)	Orthodox BC	(Jordan)
PF	15	Zaid Abbas (C)	39 – 21 November 1983	2.03 m (6 ft 8 in)	Orthodox BC	(Jordan)
SF	21	Hashem Abbas	24 – 30 March 1999	1.95 m (6 ft 5 in)	Al Hilal	(Saudi Arabia)
PG	22	Malek Kanaan	30 – 7 February 1993	1.82 m (6 ft 0 in)	Al Riyadi Amman	(Jordan)
SF	24	Rondae Hollis-Jefferson (NP)	28 – 3 January 1995	1.98 m (6 ft 6 in)	TNT Tropang Giga	(Philippines)
PF	35	Zane Al-Najdawi	26 – 26 September 1996	2.05 m (6 ft 9 in)	Al-Ahli	(Jordan)
C	44	Ahmad Al-Dwairi	30 – 4 March 1993	2.10 m (6 ft 11 in)	Bursaspor	(Turkey)

Head coach

- (Jordan) Wesam Al-Sous

Assistant coach(es)

- (Jordan) Mohammad Hadrab

Legend

- (C) Team captain
- (NP) Naturalized player
- Club – describes last
  club before the tournament
- Age – describes age
  on 25 August 2023

Roster for the 2019 FIBA Basketball World Cup.

Jordan men's national basketball team – 2019 FIBA Basketball World Cup roster
Players
Coaches

Pos.	No.	Name	Age – Date of birth	Height	Club	Ctr.
PG	0	Mahmoud Abdeen	31 – 23 December 1987	1.94 m (6 ft 4 in)	Al-Wehdat SC	(Jordan)
SG	1	Amin Abu Hawwas	25 – 26 April 1994	1.96 m (6 ft 5 in)	Orthodox (Jordan)	(Jordan)
SF	2	Dar Tucker (NP)	31 – 11 April 1988	1.97 m (6 ft 6 in)	San Lorenzo de Almagro	(Argentina)
PG	4	Jordan Dasuqi	24 – 29 November 1994	1.96 m (6 ft 5 in)	Al-Jazeera SC (Amman)	(Jordan)
SG	5	Freddy Ibrahim	22 – 14 October 1996	1.93 m (6 ft 4 in)	Orthodox (Jordan)	(Jordan)
SF	7	Ahmad Al-Hamarsheh	32 – 10 October 1986	1.98 m (6 ft 6 in)	Al-Wehdat SC	(Jordan)
PF	12	Yousef Abuwazaneh	25 – 6 December 1993	2.03 m (6 ft 8 in)	Al-Riyadi Amman	(Jordan)
C	13	Mohammad Hussein	29 – 3 March 1990	2.10 m (6 ft 11 in)	Al-Ahli SC (Amman)	(Jordan)
PF	15	Zaid Abbas (C)	35 – 21 November 1983	2.06 m (6 ft 9 in)	Al-Ahli Club (Manama)	(Bahrain)
F	22	Ahmad Obeid	29 – 24 August 1990	1.98 m (6 ft 6 in)	Orthodox (Jordan)	(Jordan)
SF	23	Mousa Al-Awadi	34 – 20 July 1985	1.98 m (6 ft 6 in)	Kafr Yuba Irbid	(Jordan)
C	44	Ahmet Düverioğlu	24 – 4 March 1995	2.14 m (7 ft 0 in)	Fenerbahçe	(Turkey)

Head coach

- (United States) Joseph Anthony Stiebing

Assistant coach(es)

- (Jordan) Zaid Al-Khas

Legend

- (C) Team captain
- (NP) Naturalized player
- Club – describes last
  club before the tournament
- Age – describes age
  on 1 July 2018

=== Head coaches ===
- (United States) Tab Baldwin (2011–2012)
- (Jordan) Zaid Al-Khas (2018–2019)
- (United States) Joseph Anthony Stiebing (2019–?)
- (Jordan) Wesam Al-Sous (2023–)
