= Hashem Abbas =

Jordanian-Palestinian basketball player

No. 21 – Amman United
- Position: Small forward
- League: Jordanian Premier Basketball League

Personal information
- Born: 30 March 1999 (age 27) Nablus, Palestine
- Listed height: 1.90 m (6 ft 3 in)
- Listed weight: 215 lb (98 kg)

Career information
- High school: St. Thomas More School (Montville, Connecticut)
- College: Bridgeport (2017–2020)
- NBA draft: 2020: undrafted
- Playing career: 2020–present

Career history
- 2020–2021: Al-Ahli
- 2021–2023: Al Hilal
- 2023–2024: Al-Wakrah
- 2024: Rum
- 2024–: Amman United
Medals
Men's basketball
Representing Jordan
Asian Games
Silver medal – second place	2022 Hangzhou

Hashem Abbas (Arabic: هاشم عباس, born 30 March, 1999) is a Jordanian-Palestinian basketball player for Amman United of the Jordanian Premier Basketball League and the Jordanian national team.

== Professional career ==
He started his professional playing career in 2020 with Al-Ahli.

Abbas joined Amman United in 2024, where he was a part of the team's 's inaugural league trophy during the 2024–25 JPL season, as well as taking part in the as well as the FIBA West Asia Super League in 2025 at the regional level, averaging 10.7 points, 6.3 rebounds, and 3.3 assists per game.

== National team career ==
Abbas played for the Jordanian national team at the 2023 FIBA Basketball World Cup in China, where he averaged 3.0 points, 1.7 rebounds and 0.3 assists per game.

== Personal life ==
Hashem is the younger brother of Zaid Abbas.

== External list ==
- Hashem Abbas at FIBA.basketball
- Hashem Abbas at Eurobasket.com
- Hashem Abbas at RealGM
- Hashem Abbas at Proballers
- Hashem Abbas – Basketball-Reference.com international player profile
- Hashem Abbas at InterSportStats
