= Mohammad Hussein =

Jordanian basketball player

No. 13 – Al-Faisaly
- Position: Center
- League: Jordanian Premier Basketball League

Personal information
- Born: 3 March 1990 (age 36) Russeifa
- Listed height: 6 ft 11 in (2.11 m)
- Listed weight: 260 lb (118 kg)

Career information
- College: ASU
- NBA draft: 2012: undrafted
- Playing career: 2008–present

Career history
- 2008–2010: Zain
- 2010–2012: Al-Awdah
- 2012–2015: A.S.U.
- 2015–2018: FUS Rabat
- 2018–2021: Al-Ahli
- 2021–2022: Al-Wehdat
- 2022–2023: Orthodox
- 2023–2024: Al Arabi
- 2024–2025: Al-Jubaiha
- 2025–present: Al-Faisaly
Medals
Men's basketball
Representing Jordan
Asian Games
Silver medal – second place	2022 Hangzhou	Team

Mohammad Shaher Hussein (born 3 March 1990, in Russeifa) is a Jordanian professional basketball player for Jordanian Premier Basketball League side Al-Faisaly and the Jordan national basketball team.

Hussein competed with the Jordanian team for the first time at the 2010 FIBA World Championship, playing center of the bench for the squad. In addition, he participated with the team in the Asian cup in 2017, and in the World Cup in 2019.
