= Mousa Al-Awadi =

Jordanian basketball player

Al-Ahli
- Position: Small forward
- League: Jordanian Premier Basketball League

Personal information
- Born: 20 July 1985 (age 41) Amman
- Listed height: 6 ft 4 in (1.93 m)
- Listed weight: 198 lb (90 kg)

Career history
- 2006–2010: Zain Club
- 2010–2015: A.S.U.
- 2015–2016: Orthodox Basketball Club
- 2016–2018: Al Riyadi Amman
- 2018–2019: Kofer Yoba Irbid
- 2020–2021: Al-Jubaiha
- 2021–present: Al-Ahli
Medals
Men's basketball
Representing Jordan
FIBA Asia Championship
Bronze medal – third place	2009 Tianjin	Team

Mousa Al-Awadi (born 20 July 1985 in Amman, Jordan) is a Jordanian professional basketball player who currently plays for Al-Ahli of the Jordanian Premier Basketball League. He also is a member of the Jordan national basketball team.

== Career ==
Al-Awadi competed with the Jordanian team at the FIBA Asia Championship 2007 and FIBA Asia Championship 2009. In 2009, Al-Awadi helped the Jordanian team to a national best third-place finish by averaging 4.8 points per game off the bench for the team. The third-place finish meant that Jordan qualified for its first ever FIBA World Championship.
