= Jordan Dasuqi =

Jordanian basketball player

No. 13 – Al-Ahli
- Position: Shooting guard
- League: Jordanian Premier Basketball League

Personal information
- Born: November 29, 1994 (age 31) Clarkston, Michigan
- Listed height: 6 ft 2 in (1.88 m)
- Listed weight: 190 lb (86 kg)

Career information
- High school: Clarkston (Clarkston, Michigan)
- College: Lake Superior State (2013–2017)
- NBA draft: 2017: undrafted

Career history
- 2019–2021: Al-Jazeera Basketball Club
- 2021–2022: Al-Ahli

Jordan Al-Dasuqi (born 29 November 1994) is a Jordanian American professional basketball player. He plays for the Jordanian national basketball team and Al-Ahli.

== High school career ==
Dasuqi played high school basketball for Clarkston High School. In 2013, he was named Clarkston High School's most-valuable player averaging 22 points, 4 assists and 5 rebounds per game.

== College career ==
Dasuqi played for the Lake Superior State University college basketball team, In his freshman season, he averaged 5.5 points, 1.75 rebound and 0.97 assist. In his Sophomore season, he averaged 8.79 points, 2.12 rebound and 1.91 assists. In his Junior season, he averaged 9.86 points, 2.82 rebound and 1.15 assists. In his Senior season, he averaged 8.04 points, 2.81 rebound and 1.15 assists.

== Professional career ==
Dasuqi signed with Jordanian Premier Basketball League side Al-Jazeera in 2019.

== National team career ==
Dasuqi represented the Jordan national basketball team at the 2019 FIBA Basketball World Cup in China, where he averaged 1 point, 0.4 rebound and 0.2 assist.
