= Michael Frazier II =

American basketball player (born 1994)

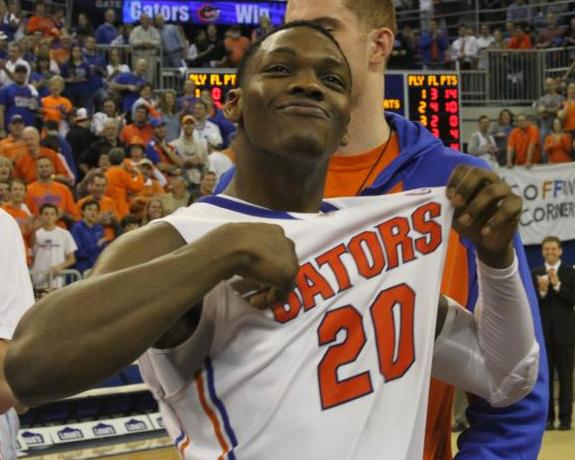
- Frazier with the Florida Gators in 2014

No. 23 – Beirut Club
- Position: Shooting guard
- League: Lebanese Basketball League

Personal information
- Born: March 8, 1994 (age 32) The Bronx, New York, U.S.
- Listed height: 6 ft 3 in (1.91 m)
- Listed weight: 200 lb (91 kg)

Career information
- High school: Montverde Academy (Montverde, Florida)
- College: Florida (2012–2015)
- NBA draft: 2015: undrafted
- Playing career: 2015–present

Career history
- 2015–2016: Los Angeles D-Fenders
- 2016: Iowa Energy
- 2016: Fort Wayne Mad Ants
- 2016–2017: Scaligera Basket Verona
- 2018–2019: Rio Grande Valley Vipers
- 2019–2020: Houston Rockets
- 2019–2020: →Rio Grande Valley Vipers
- 2021: Delaware Blue Coats
- 2021–2022: Perth Wildcats
- 2022–2023: Illawarra Hawks
- 2023: Sichuan Blue Whales
- 2024: NBA G League Ignite
- 2024–2025: Amman United
- 2025: Beirut Club
- 2025–2026: Palayesh Naft Abadan
- 2026: Taipei Taishin Mars
- 2026–present: Beirut Club

Career highlights
- NBA G League champion (2019); NBA G League Most Improved Player (2019); SEC All-Freshman Team (2013)
- Stats at NBA.com
- Stats at Basketball Reference
Medals
Men's basketball
Representing the United States
FIBA World U19 Championship
Gold medal – first place	2013 Czech Republic	National team

Michael Antonio Frazier II (born March 8, 1994) is an American professional basketball player for Beirut Club of the Lebanese Basketball League. He played college basketball for the Florida Gators.

== College career ==
In the 2013–14 season, Frazier scored eleven three-pointers in a win against South Carolina, setting a school record. He also set a school record for made three-pointers in a season (118). His junior season was derailed significantly by a high-ankle sprain suffered in the game against Kentucky.

On March 27, 2015, Frazier declared his eligibility for the 2015 NBA draft.

== Professional career ==
=== NBA D-League and Summer League (2015–2016) ===
After going undrafted in the 2015 NBA draft, Frazier joined the Golden State Warriors for the 2015 NBA Summer League. On August 25, 2015, he signed with the Los Angeles Lakers. However, he was later waived by the Lakers on October 20 after appearing in four preseason games. On October 31, he was acquired by the Los Angeles D-Fenders of the NBA Development League as an affiliate player of the Lakers. On November 24, he made his professional debut in a 94–90 win over the Oklahoma City Blue, recording three points, two rebounds and one assist in four minutes.

On January 16, 2016, Frazier was traded to the Iowa Energy in exchange for a 2016 second-round pick and the returning player rights to Kendrick Perry. Two days later, he made his debut for Iowa in a 98–94 loss to Raptors 905, recording one assist and one steal in nine minutes. On March 6, he was waived by Iowa.

On March 10, 2016, Frazier was acquired by the Fort Wayne Mad Ants. The next day, he made his debut for Fort Wayne in a 106–99 loss to the Westchester Knicks, recording three points in 12 minutes off the bench.

In July 2016, Frazier played for the Orlando Magic at the 2016 NBA Summer League.

=== Scaligera Basket Verona (2016–2017) ===
On August 9, 2016, Frazier signed with Scaligera Basket Verona of the Italian Serie A2 Citroën.

=== MHP Riesen Ludwigsburg (2017) ===
On June 27, 2017, Frazier signed with German club MHP Riesen Ludwigsburg. However, on August 12, 2017, Ludwigsburg voided Frazier's contract after he suffered a potential career-ending quad injury.

=== Rio Grande Valley Vipers (2018–2019) ===
In October 2018, Frazier joined the Rio Grande Valley Vipers of the NBA G League. In 45 games during the 2018–19 season, he averaged 16.9 points, 5.6 rebounds, 3.3 assists, and 1.5 steals. He was named the G League's Most Improved Player and helped the Vipers win the G League championship. In game three of the Finals series against the Long Island Nets, he scored 24 points with nine rebounds, six assists, two steals and a block in 45 minutes.

=== Houston Rockets (2019–2020) ===
On April 6, 2019, Frazier signed with the Houston Rockets. He did not play for the Rockets to complete to the 2018–19 NBA season.

Frazier was released by the Rockets on October 18, 2019, but was re-signed to a two-way contract two days later. He split the 2019–20 NBA season with the Rockets and Vipers.

=== Delaware Blue Coats (2021) ===
In January 2021, Frazier joined the Delaware Blue Coats for the G League hub season.

In August 2021, Frazier played for the Phoenix Suns at the 2021 NBA Summer League.

=== Perth Wildcats (2021–2022) ===
On October 15, 2021, Frazier signed with the Perth Wildcats in Australia for the 2021–22 NBL season.

=== Illawarra Hawks (2022–2023) ===
On November 21, 2022, Frazier signed with the Illawarra Hawks in Australia for the rest of the 2022–23 NBL season. On January 6, 2023, he sustained a severe arm injury in a game against the Adelaide 36ers. He was subsequently ruled out for the rest of the season. He averaged 17.5 points in eight games for the Hawks.

Frazier signed with French team Metropolitans 92 following the NBL season, but never debuted for the team.

In June 2023, Frazier joined the Shandong Hi-Speed Kirin of the Chinese Basketball Association and trained with the team, but the contract was not signed due to procedural issues.

=== Sichuan Blue Whales (2023) ===
On November 3, 2023, Frazier signed with the Sichuan Blue Whales of the Chinese Basketball Association. On December 5, he was removed from roster after three games.

=== NBA G League Ignite (2024) ===
On January 10, 2024, Frazier signed with the NBA G League Ignite.

=== Amman United (2024–2025) ===
In December 2024, Frazier joined Amman United of the Jordanian Premier Basketball League.

=== Taipei Taishin Mars (2026) ===
On February 4, 2026, Frazier signed with the Taipei Taishin Mars of the Taiwan Professional Basketball League (TPBL).

=== Beirut Club (2026–present) ===
On September 16, 2026, Frazier returned to the Beirut Club of the Lebanese Basketball League.

== Career statistics ==
Legend
GP	Games played	GS	Games started	MPG	Minutes per game
FG%	Field goal percentage	3P%	3-point field goal percentage	FT%	Free throw percentage
RPG	Rebounds per game	APG	Assists per game	SPG	Steals per game
BPG	Blocks per game	PPG	Points per game	**Bold**	Career high

=== Regular season ===
Year	Team	GP	GS	MPG	FG%	3P%	FT%	RPG	APG	SPG	BPG	PPG
2019–20	Houston	13	0	11.2	.249	.174	.643	.8	.3	.1	.0	2.1

=== Playoffs ===
Year	Team	GP	GS	MPG	FG%	3P%	FT%	RPG	APG	SPG	BPG	PPG
2019–20	Houston	4	0	3.0	.250	.500	–	1.0	.5	.0	.0	.8

== National team career ==
Frazier represented the U-19 United States national team at the 2013 U-19 World Championship held in Czech Republic, where they won the gold medal. Over nine tournament games, he averaged 6.7 points and 3.1 rebounds per game.
