= Amin Abu Hawwas =

Jordanian basketball player

No. 1 – Amman United
- Position: Shooting guard / point guard
- League: Jordanian Premier Basketball League

Personal information
- Born: April 26, 1994 (age 32) Houston, Texas, U.S.
- Listed height: 6 ft 4 in (1.93 m)
- Listed weight: 195 lb (88 kg)

Career information
- High school: Cave Spring (Roanoke, Virginia)
- College: Mars Hill (2013–2014)
- NBA draft: 2016: undrafted
- Playing career: 2016–present

Career history
- 2016–2017: Al Riyadi Amman
- 2017–2018: Al-Ahli
- 2018–2020: Orthodox
- 2020–2021: Al-Wehdat
- 2021–2022: Al-Shamal SC
- 2022: Orthodox
- 2022–2023: Al-Ahli
- 2023–2024: Al-Hashd
- 2024: Al-Shorta
- 2024–present: Amman United

Amin Ismail Abu Hawwas (Arabic: أمين أبو حواس, born 26 April 1994) is a Jordanian-American basketball player for Amman United and the Jordanian national basketball team. He stands at 6'4" and plays in both shooting guard and point guard positions. Scoring champion in back to back seasons 2021/2022. Won MVP in 2022 season.

== High school ==
Hawwas attended Cave Spring High School from 2009 to 2012 and played varsity basketball his junior and senior year. During his senior year, he led his team to the state finals. He was awarded district player of the year for the 2012 season, and regional player of the year for the 2012 season. He was selected for first team all-state for the 2012 season. He averaged 19.5 points, 7.2 rebound and 2.1 assist.

== College career ==
Hawwas played college basketball for Mars Hill University. In his freshman season, he averaged 3.58 points, 0.33 rebound and 0.42 assist.

== Professional career ==
Hawwas joined the Jordanian side Orthodox in the 2018 season.

Hawwas joined the Jordanian club Al-Wehdat. Lead league in scoring with 22.7 ppg

Hawwas signed with the Qatar side Al-Shamal SC

Hawwas signed with the Jordanian club Orthodox in 2022 season. Went on to win MVP and leading league in scoring with 26.4 ppg

== National team career ==
Hawwas represented the Jordanian national basketball team where in the 2016 FIBA Asia Challenge, he averaged 5.5 points, 1.9 rebounds and 1.8 assists. He played at the 2017 FIBA Asia Cup where he averaged 9 points, 3.4 rebound and 1.6 assists. He also played at the 2019 FIBA Basketball World Cup in China, where he averaged 3.3 points, 0.5 rebound and 0 assist.
