= Freddy Ibrahim =

Jordanian basketball player

No. 3 – Abra Weavers
- Position: Point guard
- League: East Asia Super League

Personal information
- Born: October 14, 1996 (age 30) Mississauga, Ontario, Canada
- Listed height: 6 ft 2.5 in (1.89 m)
- Listed weight: 170 lb (77 kg)

Career information
- High school: Father Michael Goetz Secondary School (Mississauga, Ontario)
- College: Tampa (2015–2019)
- NBA draft: 2019: undrafted
- Playing career: 2019–present

Career history
- 2019–2020: Orthodox
- 2020–2021: Al-Ahli
- 2021–2022: Al-Ahli Jeddah
- 2022–2024: Orthodox
- 2024: Montreal Alliance
- 2024–present: Amman United
Medals
Men's basketball
Representing Jordan
Asian Games
Silver medal – second place	2022 Hangzhou	Team

Freddy Ibrahim (born October 14, 1996), also known as Fadi Mustafa or Fadi Sedqi Salim Mustafa, is a Jordanian-Canadian basketball player for the Abra Weavers of the East Asia Super League (EASL). He is considered one of the best point guards of the league.

== College career ==
Ibrahim played college basketball for the Tampa Spartans of the University of Tampa, In his first year he averaged 2.0 points, 1.4 rebounds and 1.1 assists per game. In his sophomore year, he averaged 5 points, 3.1 rebounds and 3.7 assists per game. In his junior year, he averaged 4.2 points, 2.6 rebounds and 2.8 assists per game. He averaged 10.2 points, 4.5 rebounds and 3.1 assists per game in his senior year.

== Professional career ==
Ibrahim joined the Jordanian side Orthodox in the 2019–20 season.

On August 12, 2024, Ibrahim signed with Amman United of the Jordanian Premier Basketball League.

== National team career ==
Ibrahim played for the Jordanian national team at William Jones Cup in Taiwan and the 2019 FIBA Basketball World Cup in China, where he averaged 7.2 points, 2.4 rebounds and 3.4 assists per game.
