= New English School =

New English School may refer to:

- New English School (Jordan)
- New English School (Kuwait)
