= Inglizia SC =

Professional sports club from Amman

Inglizia
- Leagues: Jordanian Premier Basketball League
- Founded: 2014
- History: Inglizia; 2014–present
- Arena: Prince Hamza Hall
- Capacity: 7,500
- Location: Amman, Jordan
- Team colors
- Chairman: Dr. Said El-Turk
- Head coach: Haitham Tleib
- Website: Official website

Inglizia Sports Club (Arabic: نادي الإنجليزية الرياضي) is a Jordanian sports club based in Amman. Their men's basketball team currently compete in the Jordanian Premier Basketball League, the top flight of Jordanian basketball.

== Players ==
=== Roster ===
Note: Flags indicate national team eligibility at FIBA-sanctioned events. Players may hold other non-FIBA nationalities not displayed.

Inglizia roster
Players
Coaches

Pos.	No.	Nat.	Name	Ht.
G	00	(Jordan)	Munir Idais	1.85 m (6 ft 1 in)
	0	(Jordan)	Abdallah Deis
G	2	(Jordan)	Basel Al-Khawaldeh	1.87 m (6 ft 2 in)
SG	3	(Jordan)	Tareq Emseih	1.86 m (6 ft 1 in)
F/C	6	(Jordan)	Majdi Al-Ghazawi	1.98 m (6 ft 6 in)
PF	7	(Jordan)	Issam Hazaimeh	2.00 m (6 ft 7 in)
G	10	(Jordan)	Hamzeh Shaaban	1.84 m (6 ft 0 in)
C	11	(United States)	Malik Wineglass	2.03 m (6 ft 8 in)
G	13	(Jordan)	Nader Ahmed	1.93 m (6 ft 4 in)
F	20	(Jordan)	Ahmed Al-Khatib	1.97 m (6 ft 6 in)
SG	24	(Jordan)	Mutaz Swais
C	33	(Jordan)	Mousa Mutlaq	2.04 m (6 ft 8 in)
SG	48	(Jordan)	Hani Al-Faraj	1.95 m (6 ft 5 in)
C	77	(Jordan)	Saed Al-Khawaldeh	2.00 m (6 ft 7 in)

Head coach

- (Jordan) Haitham Tleib

Legend

- (C) Team captain
- Injured

== See also ==
- New English School (Jordan)
