= Zaid Abbas =

Jordanian basketball player

No. 15 – Orthodox Basketball Club
- Position: Forward
- League: Jordanian Premier Basketball League

Personal information
- Born: November 21, 1983 (age 42) Nablus, Palestine
- Listed height: 6 ft 8 in (2.03 m)
- Listed weight: 200 lb (91 kg)

Career history
- 2006–2008: Zain Club
- 2008–2010: A.S.U.
- 2010: Shanghai Sharks
- 2010–2011: Beijing Ducks
- 2011–2012: Fujian Sturgeons
- 2012–2013: Shandong Lions
- 2013–2014: Tianjin Gold Lions
- 2014–2015: Shanxi Brave Dragons
- 2015–2016: Byblos Club
- 2016–2017: Jiangsu Tongxi Monkey King
- 2017–2018: Beikong Fly Dragons
- 2018–2020: Al-Ahli
- 2020–2021: Al-Ahli
- 2021–2022: Orthodox Basketball Club

Career highlights
- CBA rebounding leader (2012)
Medals
Men's basketball
Representing Jordan
FIBA Asia Championship
Bronze medal – third place	2009 Tianjin	Team
Silver medal – second place	2011 Wuhan	Team
FIBA Asia Challenge
Bronze medal – third place	2016 Tehran	Team
William Jones Cup
Gold medal – first place	2007 Taipei	Team
Silver medal – second place	2009 Taipei	Team

Zaid Abbas (Arabic: زيد عباس; born November 21, 1983, in Nablus) is a Jordanian professional basketball player. He last played for Orthodox Basketball Club of the Jordanian Premier Basketball League. He also was a member of the Jordan men's national basketball team.

== Professional career ==
On the heels of his strong 2009 Asia Championship performance, Abbas signed with Chinese Basketball Association team Shanghai Sharks, where he spent the 2009–10 season. Abbas played for the Beijing Ducks for the 2010–11 season. For the 2011–12 season, Abbas played for Fujian Xunxing.

== National team career ==
Abbas competed with the Jordanian team at the FIBA Asia Championship 2007 and FIBA Asia Championship 2009. In 2009, Abbas helped the Jordanian team to a national best third-place finish by averaging 13.8 points and a team-leading 8.8 rebounds per game. The third-place finish meant that Jordan qualified for its first ever FIBA World Championship. There, he averaged 15.2 points and 8.4 rebounds per game.

Jordan made its return to the FIBA World Cup in 2019. They won their first World Cup game that year against Senegal. In 2021, Abbas announced that he would be retiring from the national team.

Nearly a year later, coach Wesam Al-Sous convinced him to re-join the team for the 2022 FIBA Asia Cup. At the age of 39, Abbas made the roster for the 2023 FIBA World Cup. He was the second-oldest player to compete in that tournament behind Marcelo Huertas. However, he went back to Jordan during the tournament due to an urgent family health situation.
