= 2002 WABA Champions Cup =

The WABA Champions Cup 2002 was the 5th staging of the WABA Champions Cup, the basketball club tournament of West Asia Basketball Association. The tournament was held in Beirut, Lebanon between March 8 and March 10. The winner qualify for the 2002 ABC Champions Cup.

Sagesse from Lebanon won the tournament by a 3–0 record and advanced to the final round in Kuala Lumpur.

== Standings ==
Team	Pld	W	L	PF	PA	PD	Pts
(Lebanon) Sagesse	3	3	0	313	235	+78	6
(Jordan) Orthodox	3	2	1	236	230	+6	5
(Iraq) Al-Karkh	3	1	2	226	283	−57	4
(Iran) Zob Ahan Isfahan	3	0	3	249	276	−27	3

== Results ==
March 8
18:00

Al-Karkh (Iraq)	73–128	(Lebanon) Sagesse

Ghazir Club Court, Beirut

March 8
20:30

Orthodox (Jordan)	88–80	(Iran) Zob Ahan Isfahan

Ghazir Club Court, Beirut

March 9
17:00

Sagesse (Lebanon)	100–88	(Iran) Zob Ahan Isfahan

Ghazir Club Court, Beirut

March 9
19:30

Orthodox (Jordan)	74–65	(Iraq) Al-Karkh

Ghazir Club Court, Beirut

March 10
18:00

Sagesse (Lebanon)	85–74	(Jordan) Orthodox

Ghazir Club Court, Beirut

March 10
20:30

Zob Ahan Isfahan (Iran)	81–88	(Iraq) Al-Karkh

Ghazir Club Court, Beirut
