= Mahmoud Abdeen =

Jordanian basketball player

No. 0 – Al-Ahli
- Position: Point guard
- League: Jordanian Premier Basketball League

Personal information
- Born: December 23, 1987 (age 38) Amman, Jordan
- Listed height: 6 ft 3 in (1.91 m)
- Listed weight: 193 lb (88 kg)

Career information
- College: Applied Science University
- NBA draft: 2009: undrafted
- Playing career: 2006–present

Career history
- 2006–2011: Orthodox Basketball Club
- 2011–2012: Al-Awdah
- 2012–2015: A.S.U.
- 2015–2016: San Miguel Beermen
- 2017–2018: Al-Kahraba
- 2018–2022: Al-Wehdat
- 2022: Al-Ahli
- currently: Al-Wehdat

Mahmoud Abdeen (born 23 December 1987) is a Jordanian professional basketball player for the Jordanian national basketball team and Al-Wehdat in the Jordanian Premier Basketball League. He is the MVP of the 2019–20 season, and considered one of the all-star five players of the league.

== Professional career ==
Abdeen played the 2015–16 season at Filippino side San Miguel Beermen, where he averaged 3.67 points, 1.67 rebounds and 2.33 assists. He played the 2017–18 season at Al-Kahraba team in the Iraqi Basketball League. He moved Al-Wehdat in the 2018–19 season, where he earned the MVP award at that time. Abdeen re-signed with the team on 28 September 2021.

== National team career ==
Mahmoud Abdeen represented the Jordan national basketball team at the 2013 FIBA Asia Championship where he averaged 6.6 points, 1.7 rebounds and 1.7 assists. He participated at the 2015 FIBA Asia Championship where he averaged 10 points, 2.3 rebounds and 2.4 assists. He also played at the 2017 FIBA Asia Championship where he averaged 14.3 points, 2.3 rebounds and 5.9 assists. He also played at the 2019 FIBA Basketball World Cup in China, where he averaged 5.4 point, 1.3 rebound and 1.8 assists.
