= Al-Faisaly SC (basketball) =

Professional basketball club from Amman

Al-Faisaly
- Nickname: النسر الأزرق (lit. 'The Blue Eagle') الزعيم (lit. 'The Boss')
- Leagues: Jordanian Premier Basketball League
- Founded: 1946
- History: Al-Faisaly; 1946–present
- Arena: Prince Hamza Hall
- Capacity: 7,500
- Location: Amman, Jordan
- Team colors
- Chairman: Temporary committee
- Head coach: Abdallah Abuqoura
- Website: Official page
Home	Away

Al-Faisaly Sports Club (Arabic: نادي الفيصلي كرة السلة) is a Jordanian basketball club based in Amman. They currently compete in the Jordanian Premier Basketball League, the top flight of Jordanian basketball.

== Players ==
=== Roster ===
Note: Flags indicate national team eligibility at FIBA-sanctioned events. Players may hold other non-FIBA nationalities not displayed.

Al-Faisaly roster
Players
Coaches

Pos.	No.	Nat.	Name	Ht.	Age
F	1	(Canada) (Jordan)	Ahmad Khazaleh	2.02 m (6 ft 8 in)
G	5	(United States) (Palestine)	Brian Halums	1.96 m (6 ft 5 in)	28 – 18 September 1997
G	6	(Jordan)	Yosef Dweik	1.86 m (6 ft 1 in)	24 – 4 October 2001
PG	8	(Jordan)	Ammar Bostami	1.80 m (5 ft 11 in)	35 – 14 February 1991
PG	10	(Jordan)	Adham Dajani	1.78 m (5 ft 10 in)	24 – 23 January 2002
G	11	(Jordan)	Abdullah Olajuwon	1.95 m (6 ft 5 in)	22 – 11 February 2004
G	12	(Jordan)	Ahmad Atiyeh	1.80 m (5 ft 11 in)	27 – 26 May 1999
C	13	(Jordan)	Mohammad Hussein	2.10 m (6 ft 11 in)	36 – 3 March 1990
F	15	(Jordan)	Hussein Ababneh	1.95 m (6 ft 5 in)	20 – 21 April 2006
PG	24	(Jordan)	Ali El-Zubi	1.85 m (6 ft 1 in)	36 – 1 August 1989
SF	25	(United States)	Daniel Hamilton	2.01 m (6 ft 7 in)	30 – 8 August 1995
G	33	(Jordan)	Ali Abu Hussein	1.88 m (6 ft 2 in)	25 – 6 March 2001
C	44	(Jordan)	Ammar Al-Omare	2.08 m (6 ft 10 in)

Head coach

- (Jordan) Abdallah Abuqoura

Legend

- (C) Team captain
- Injured

== Honours ==
=== Domestic ===
- Jordan Cup
  - Winners (1): 2026

== See also ==
- Al-Faisaly SC
- Derby of Jordan
