= 1999 WABA Champions Cup =

The WABA Champions Cup 1999 was the 2nd staging of the WABA Champions Cup, the basketball club tournament of West Asia Basketball Association. The tournament was held in Amman, Jordan between April 12 and April 15. The winner qualified for the 1999 ABC Champions Cup.

== Standings ==
Team	Pld	W	L	Pts
(Jordan) Orthodox	2	2	0	4
(Iraq) Al-Quwa Al-Jawiya	2	1	1	3
(Palestine) Al-Quds	2	0	2	2
