= Make Life Skate Life =

Non-profit organization

Make Life Skate Life is a non-profit organization that works to create community-built skateparks around the world.

== Completed skatepark projects ==
- 2013 — Holystoked Skatepark — ⁣Bangalore, India
- 2014 —⁣ Pura Pura Skatepark⁣ — ⁣La Paz, Bolivia
- 2014 — ⁣7Hills Skatepark ⁣— ⁣Amman, Jordan
- 2015 —⁣ Pushing Myanmar⁣ — ⁣Yangon, Myanmar
- 2016 — ⁣Addis Skatepark⁣ — ⁣Addis Ababa, Ethiopia
- 2018 —⁣ Suli Skatepark⁣ — ⁣Sulaymaniyah, Iraq
