= Anthony Miles (basketball) =

American basketball player (born 1989)

Personal information
- Born: December 15, 1989 (age 36) New Orleans, Louisiana, U.S.
- Listed height: 6 ft 1 in (1.85 m)
- Listed weight: 165 lb (75 kg)

Career information
- High school: Clear Brook (Friendswood, Texas)
- College: Lamar (2008–2012)
- NBA draft: 2012: undrafted
- Playing career: 2012–2023
- Position: Point guard / shooting guard

Career history
- 2012–2013: Rotterdam
- 2014: Politekhnika-Halychyna
- 2014–2015: Starogard Gdański
- 2015: Energia Târgu Jiu
- 2016: VEF Rīga
- 2016–2017: Starogard Gdański
- 2017–2018: Givova Scafati
- 2018–2019: Cagliari Dinamo Academy
- 2019–2021: Pallacanestro Orzinuovi
- 2021: Beirut Club
- 2022: Al Ahli Tripoli
- 2022–2023: Staff Mantova

Career highlights
- DBL scoring champion (2013); DBL All-Star (2013)

Anthony Gillespie Miles (born December 15, 1989) is an American professional basketball player. He played college basketball for Lamar and continued his career as a professional in Europe, as well as in Asia.

== Professional career ==
His first professional season, Miles played in the Netherlands for Rotterdam Basketbal College. He finished at the last place in the Dutch Basketball League with the team, but did average 18.8 points per game in the league, which made him the scoring champion.

On January 5, 2014 Miles signed with BC Politekhnika-Halychyna of the Ukrainian Basketball Super League.

On July 27, 2017, Miles signed with Givova Scafati of the Italian Serie A2 Basket. He averaged 19.4 points and 4.9 rebounds per game. On July 8, 2018, Miles signed with Cagliari Dinamo Academy.

Miles joined Pallacanestro Orzinuovi in 2019. He averaged 25.5 points, 4.4 rebounds and 4.3 assists per game in 10 games. On June 1, 2020, he re-signed with the club. Miles averaged 21.4 points, 5.5 rebounds, 3.9 assists, and 1.8 steals per game. On September 5, 2021, Miles signed with Beirut Club of the Lebanese Basketball League.

On January 5, 2022, Miles signed with Libyan club Al Ahli Tripoli of the Libyan Division 1.
