= Joey Stiebing =

American basketball coach (born 1961)

Biographical details
- Born: August 11, 1961 (age 65)

Coaching career (HC unless noted)
- 1982–1984: LSU (student assistant)
- 1984–1986: Archbishop Shaw High School (assistant)
- 1986–1990: Archbishop Shaw High School
- 1990–1997: New Orleans (assistant)
- 1997–2001: New Orleans
- 2003–2007: Qatar
- 2007–2010: Loyola University New Orleans (assistant)
- 2010–2015: Sichuan Blue Whales
- 2015–2018: Southeastern Louisiana (special assistant)

Head coaching record
- Overall: 57–58 (.496)

Accomplishments and honors

Championships
- Chinese National Basketball League (2013)

Awards
- Sun Belt Coach of the Year (2001)

Joey Stiebing (born August 11, 1961) is a former American basketball coach. He was formerly the head coach for the New Orleans Privateers.

== Coaching career ==
Stiebing started his career as a student assistant for the LSU Tigers. Next he would serve as an assistant coach for Archbishop Shaw High School, where he was promoted to head coach in 1990. Then he would get a job at the University of New Orleans as an assistant coach for the Privateers, a position he held for seven years. On April 8, 1997, he was promoted to be the next head coach for New Orleans. He served as their head coach for four years, compiling a 57–58 record and winning the Sun Belt Coach of the Year in 2001. However, on March 12, 2001, Stiebing was fired by New Orleans. His next stop would be the Qatar men's national team, where he would coach for four years. Next he would become an assistant coach for Loyola University New Orleans. Then the head coach for the Sichuan Blue Whales in China, leading them to a Chinese National Basketball League (NBL) title in 2013 and promotion to the first-tier Chinese Basketball Association. Then he would be hired as a special assistant for the Southeastern Louisiana Lions.

== Personal life ==
Stiebing earned his BS in distributive education at Louisiana State University in 1985 before earning his MEd degree in curriculum and instruction from the University of New Orleans in 1996.
