= Jordan Basketball Federation =

Governing body for the Jordan national basketball team

- Abbreviation: JBF
- Formation: 1957; 69 years ago
- Headquarters: Gate 6, Al-Hussein Youth City, Amman, Jordan
- Location: Amman, Jordan
- President: Mohammad Alayan
- Affiliations: FIBA; FIBA Asia; Jordan Olympic Committee
- Website: www.jbf.jo

The Jordan Basketball Federation is the governing body of basketball in Jordan.

The federation founded in 1957, represents basketball with public authorities as well as with national and international sports organizations and as such with Jordan in international competitions. It is affiliated with FIBA and FIBA Asia. The federation also organizes the Jordan national basketball team and the Jordan women's national basketball team.

== History ==
Jordan joined FIBA in 1957, FIBA Asia in 1964, and the Arab Basketball Confederation in 1974. It joined the West Asia Basketball Association in 1998.

Its main league is the Jordanian Premier Basketball League.

=== Development Initiatives ===
Jordan Falcons House

Is a plan to build a multi-court complex, with 5,000 seats in Amman, financed through community engagement and sponsorship, aimed to elevate infrastructure and coaching. Appointment of foreign experts, including High Performance Director Dr. Craig Slaunwhite and Canadian Roy Rana, to strengthen national team structure.

=== Controversies ===
During the 2025 FIBA U19 Basketball World Cup Jordan withrew from its scheduled match against Israel that was to take place on 29 June 2025.
