= New English School (Jordan) =

Coordinates: 31°59′13.26″N 35°50′50.01″E

The New English School (NES)
- المدرسة الانجليزية الحديثة
- Amman; Jordan

Information
- Motto: Ex Oriente Lux (Light From The East)
- Established: 1986
- School district: Khalda
- Chairperson: Mr. Said El Turk
- Principal: Ms Majd Khayyat Talhouni
- Staff: 350+
- Grades: Creche - year13
- Enrollment: 1000+
- Website: nes.edu.jo

The New English School (NES) is a bilingual school located in Amman, Jordan, teaching A-levels and International GCSE.

== School profile ==
The New English School (NES) is divided into four main sections: Kindergarten, Primary School, Middle School and Secondary Department. Students graduate at the end of Grade 12. The school also caters for a small number of pupils with Irlen scotopic sensitivity syndrome, a visual perceptual disorder affecting primarily reading and writing.

=== Curriculum ===
Based on the British system, students of the Senior School, in Grades 9 and 10, follow syllabuses laid down in a range of subjects by Cambridge International Examinations, preparing them for International General Certificate of Secondary Education (IGCSE) examinations, and by the University of London, preparing for O Levels. The IGCSE is the international equivalent of GCSE examinations taken by students in schools in England and Wales at age 16 and above. These examinations are set, moderated and marked by the examining boards of the universities.

The student programme at this level includes compulsory study and examination of English Language, Mathematics, Arabic, Religion, Information Technology and Physical Education together with five further subjects chosen from a range including Physics, Biology, Chemistry, English Literature, French, Economics, Business Studies, Computer Studies, Child Development, Drama and Art.

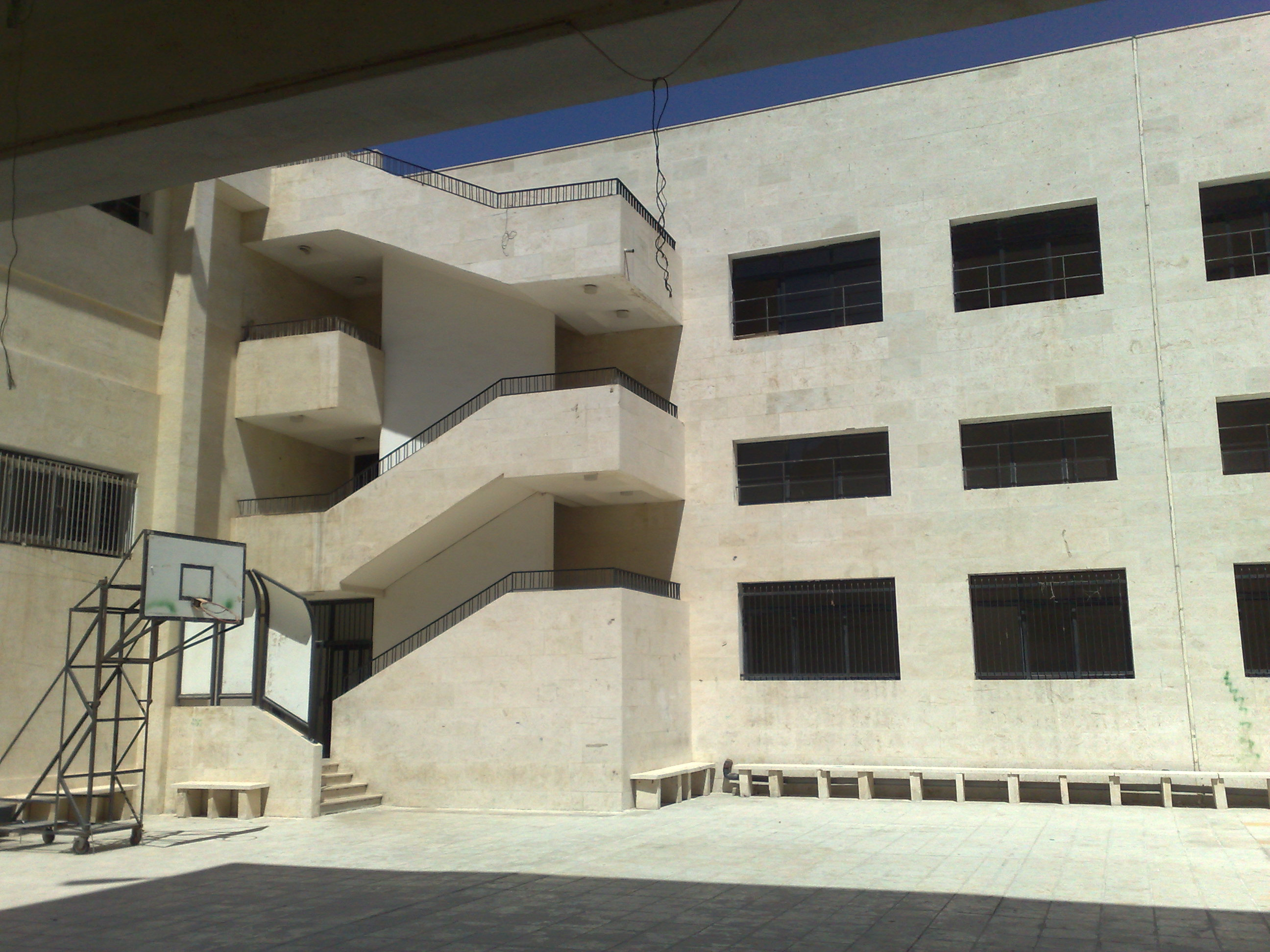
The inside of the secondary school

After successfully completing at least six examinations at this level, students move on to the General Certificate of Education Advanced Level (GCE A-Level) programme. This comprises a further two years of study according to syllabuses laid down by the aforementioned universities, Cambridge and the University of London. Normally, students will take two or three subjects at this level, from the same range as above, but there is a provision for them to take four if they wish. In Grade 11, students follow A-S components, representing half of the ‘A’ level course and in Grade 12 they follow A2 components, focusing on the other half of the ‘A’ level course. The programme at this level also includes Religion, Information Technology, English and Communication, Numeracy and Physical Education courses, which are not externally examined.

In order to achieve equivalence for the Ministry of Education school-leaving certificate in Jordan, students must have passed a minimum of six IGCSE or O Levels at Grade D or above plus a minimum of two A-Levels at Grades A to E.

Most of the students from this school proceed to attend universities in the United Kingdom, the United States, Canada and Jordan, while a small number proceed to studies in Lebanese universities.

The curriculum is based on the US Common Core State Standards.

=== Extracurricular activities ===
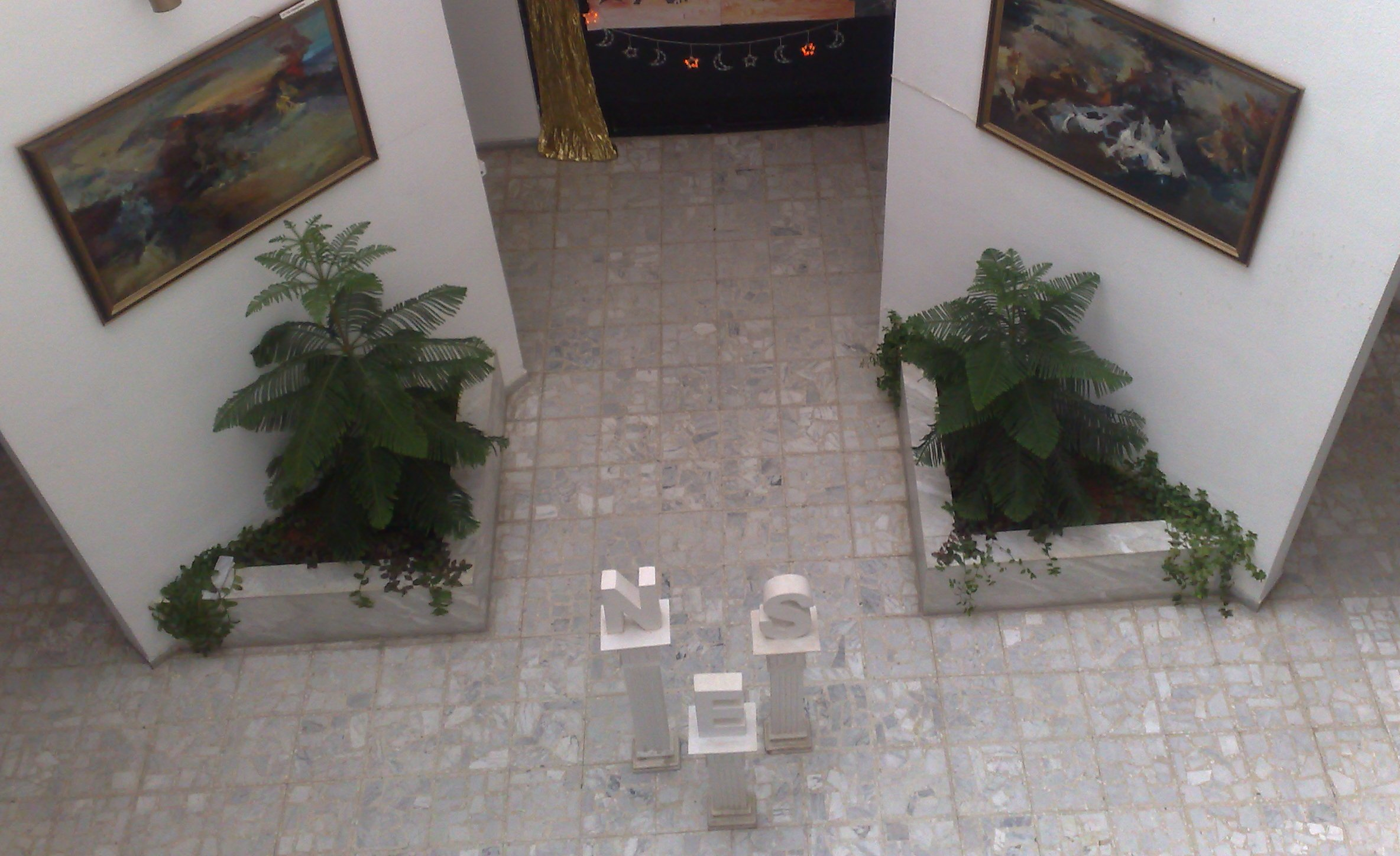
Main entrance of The New English School

Extracurricular clubs and activities which are available in the School include Volleyball, Football, Basketball, Ballet, Sports Day and Homework Club. School trips of an educational, cultural or sporting nature are organized from K-12. Various festivals and special events are also hosted by the school throughout the year.

Secondary School students also participate in extracurricular activities, including chess, team sports contests, a Students' Council, and a PR team, in association with the school's administrators, plans social trips and events.

The French Department supervises tours to France.

English Department holds an annual writing contest and spelling bee show.

The Arabic Department runs regular writing competitions and events.

The PE Department ensures that students are trained to compete in the private schools’ tournaments.

The Art Department, assisted by senior students, runs an active Art Club and Art Exhibition.

The Music and Drama departments collaborate to stage musicals and Plays.

The school also runs its own Model United Nations Club, which takes part in local and international conferences. The New English School (NES) Model United Nations has taken part in several conferences abroad, including PAMUN in Paris, THIMUN in the Hague and GIMUN in Geneva.

== Cambridge awards ==
The following table records the number of Cambridge Awards the school received from 2006, onward. These awards were received for IGCSE.

Year	Number of national rankings	Number of international rankings
2006	4 (Information technology, Chemistry, Physics, Drama, Mathematics)	1 (Mathematics)
2007	4 (Mathematics, Information technology, Business, French, Physics, Biology, Chemistry)	1 (Computer Studies, Mathematics, Physics)
2008	2 (Business, Economics, Mathematics)	1 (English as a second language, Economics, Mathematics)

== See also ==
- Inglizia SC
