= 7Hills Skatepark =

Skatepark in Amman, Jordan

Coordinates: 31.954305°N 35.923143°E

The 7Hills Skatepark is a 650 sq. meter concrete skatepark located at Samir Rifai Park in downtown Amman, Jordan named for the seven hills that the city is built on.

== History ==
7Hills skatepark is Jordan's first skate park. The project was initiated, fundraised through Indiegogo, and constructed by non-profit organization Make Life Skate Life and local artists are encouraged to use its walls as their canvas. The skatepark was built in December 2014 and connects different groups of refugees in Amman via equipment rental, classes, separate times for boys and girls and more. Jesse Locke's documentary 7 Hills tells the story of the creation of the park.
