= Amman United =

Professional basketball club from Amman

- Leagues: Jordanian Premier Basketball League; West Asia Super League
- Founded: 2017
- History: Amman United; 2017–present
- Arena: Prince Hamza Hall
- Capacity: 6,000
- Location: Amman, Jordan
- Team colors
- Main sponsor: Kia, Jordan Kuwait Bank
- Head coach: Makoto Mamiya
- Championships: Premier League (1)
Home	Away

The previous logo of Amman United

Amman United Club (Arabic: نادي إتحاد عمان) is a Jordanian professional basketball club based in the capital city of Amman. Amman United made their debut in the 2024–25 Jordanian Premier Basketball League season, as well as the FIBA West Asia Super League in 2025 at the regional level. Its teams play in several age levels in the country, including boys and girls.

== Players ==
=== Current roster ===
Note: Flags indicate national team eligibility at FIBA-sanctioned events. Players may hold other non-FIBA nationalities not displayed.

Amman United roster
Players
Coaches

Pos.	No.	Nat.	Name	Ht.
SG	1	(Jordan) (United States)	Amin Abu Hawwas	1.93 m (6 ft 4 in)
C	3	(Jordan)	Yousef Abuwazaneh	2.03 m (6 ft 8 in)
PG	4	(Jordan)	Fadi Qarmash	1.80 m (5 ft 11 in)
PG	5	(Jordan) (Canada)	Freddy Ibrahim	1.89 m (6 ft 2 in)
PF	7	(Jordan)	Ahmad Al-Hamarsheh (C)	1.96 m (6 ft 5 in)
C	9	(Jordan)	Altayeb Abultayeb	2.00 m (6 ft 7 in)
SG	10	(Jordan)	Abdullah Shatat	1.88 m (6 ft 2 in)
G	11	(Jordan)	Yazan Al-Taweel	1.88 m (6 ft 2 in)
SF	21	(Jordan) (Palestine)	Hashem Abbas	1.98 m (6 ft 6 in)
C	41	(United States)	Evan Maxwell	2.03 m (6 ft 8 in)

Head coach

- (Japan) Makoto Mamiya

Legend

- (C) Team captain
- Injured

== Honours ==
=== Domestic ===
- Jordanian Premier Basketball League
  - Winners (1): 2024–25
