= Shabab Bushra SC =

Professional basketball club from Irbid

- Leagues: Jordanian Premier Basketball League
- History: Shabab Bushra; 2016–present
- Arena: Al-Hassan Hall
- Capacity: 2,000
- Location: Irbid, Jordan
- Team colors
- Head coach: Amjad Ajbarah
Home	Away

Shabab Bushra Sports Club (Arabic: نادي شباب بشرى الرياضي) is a Jordanian basketball club based in Irbid, Jordan. It currently competes in the Jordanian Premier Basketball League, the top tier of Jordanian basketball.

== Players ==
=== Current roster ===
Note: Flags indicate national team eligibility at FIBA-sanctioned events. Players may hold other non-FIBA nationalities not displayed.

Shabab Bushra roster
Players
Coaches

Pos.	No.	Nat.	Name	Ht.
PG		(United States)	Isräel Lockamy	1.78 m (5 ft 10 in)
SF		(Palestine)	Yousef Shatat	1.93 m (6 ft 4 in)
		(Jordan)	Sultan Albassam
C		(Jordan)	Ibrahim Alnaser	2.05 m (6 ft 9 in)
		(Jordan)	Yanal Boshheil
		(Jordan)	Yazeed Boshheil
		(Jordan)	Jalal Bustami
		(Jordan)	Ali Zyadneh
		(Jordan)	Mohammad Badani
		(Jordan)	Ahmed Jumaa	2.03 m (6 ft 8 in)
		(Jordan)	Radwan Basatneh
		(Jordan)	Yousef Badran
		(Jordan)	Mohamed Ababneh
		(Jordan)	Anas Hudhud
		(Jordan)	Zaid Al-Gharaibeh

Head coach

- (Jordan) Amjad Ajbarah

Legend

- (C) Team captain
- Injured
