= Kafr Yuba SC =

Professional basketball club from Irbid

- Nickname: أسود الشمال; Lions of the North
- Leagues: Jordanian Premier Basketball League
- History: Kafr Yuba; 2000–present
- Arena: Al-Hassan Hall
- Capacity: 2,000
- Location: Irbid, Jordan
- Team colors
- Head coach: Ibrahim Abu Asous
Home	Away

Kafr Yuba Sporting Club (Arabic: نادي كفريوبا الرياضي) is a Jordanian basketball club based in Irbid, Jordan. It last competed in the Jordanian Premier Basketball League, the top tier of Jordanian basketball.
