= Al-Ashrafieh SC =

Professional basketball club from Irbid

- Leagues: Jordanian Premier Basketball League
- History: Al-Ashrafieh; 1976–present
- Arena: Al-Hassan Hall
- Capacity: 2,000
- Location: Irbid, Jordan
- Team colors
- Head coach: Abdel Salam Saleh
Home	Away

Al-Ashrafieh Sports Club (Arabic: نادي الأشرفية الرياضي) is a Jordanian basketball club based in Irbid, Jordan. It currently competes in the Jordanian Premier Basketball League, the top tier of Jordanian basketball.

== Players ==
=== Current roster ===
Note: Flags indicate national team eligibility at FIBA-sanctioned events. Players may hold other non-FIBA nationalities not displayed.

Al-Ashrafieh roster
Players
Coaches

Pos.	No.	Nat.	Name	Ht.
F		(Democratic Republic of the Congo) (Canada)	Eric Kibi	1.98 m (6 ft 6 in)
G		(Jordan) (United States)	Julian Shahateet	1.95 m (6 ft 5 in)
G		(Jordan)	Ammar Al-Shraiqi	1.85 m (6 ft 1 in)
F		(Jordan)	Mohammad Bakir	1.97 m (6 ft 6 in)
		(Jordan)	Ahmad Abu Rashid
		(Jordan)	Hamzah Bataineh
		(Jordan)	Yousef Rihan
		(Jordan)	Mohammad Thiabat
		(Jordan)	Mustafa Thiabat
		(Jordan)	Mohammad Azaizeh
		(Jordan)	Abdullah Bani Ershead

Head coach

- (Jordan) Abdel Salam Saleh

Legend

- (C) Team captain
- Injured
