= Al-Jalil SC Basketball (Irbid) =

Professional basketball club from Irbid

Al-Jalil SC
- Nickname: وحوش الشمال; Wuhush Al-Shamaal (Monsters of the North)
- Leagues: Jordanian Premier Basketball League
- Founded: 1952
- History: Al-Jalil; 1952–present
- Arena: Al-Hassan Hall
- Capacity: 2,000
- Location: Irbid, Jordan
- Team colors
- President: Saeed Ajawi
- Team manager: Abdel Salam Saleh
Home	Away

Al-Jalil Sports Club (Arabic: نادي الجليل كرة السلة) is a Jordanian basketball club based in Irbid, Jordan. It currently competes in the Jordanian Premier Basketball League, the top tier of Jordanian basketball.

== History ==
Al-Jalil SC was founded in 1952 and was named after the Galilee region in Palestine, which includes areas of Northern Palestine, such as Nazareth, Tiberias, Safed, and more. It was formed by the people of Irbid Camp. The club aimed to provide the social, cultural and sporting aspect to the Irbid Camp community. Throughout its history, the club played a national role in promoting the Palestinian cause and the right to return, and has carried out many activities for their community.

== Players ==
=== Current roster ===
Note: Flags indicate national team eligibility at FIBA-sanctioned events. Players may hold other non-FIBA nationalities not displayed.

Al-Jalil roster
Players
Coaches

Pos.	No.	Nat.	Name	Ht.
C	34	(Jordan)	Ghazi Al-Salah	2.10 m (6 ft 11 in)
G	1	(United States)	Patrick Burnett	1.93 m (6 ft 4 in)
	0	(Jordan)	Ammar Al Omare
	9	(Jordan)	Mohammad Al Buheiri
PG	10	(Jordan)	Yousef Barbari	1.72 m (5 ft 8 in)
C	33	(Jordan)	Moussa Mutleq	2.04 m (6 ft 8 in)
		(Jordan)	Hamza Bataiyneh
	6	(Jordan)	Ahmad Barbari
		(Jordan)	Saif Abu Al-Haija
		(Jordan)	Yousef Badran
		(Jordan)	Mohammad Akef
		(Jordan)	Mohammad Abu Alnoor
		(Jordan)	Hossam Badr
		(Jordan)	Ahmad Jumaa	2.03 m (6 ft 8 in)
		(Jordan)	Yousef Ababneh	1.95 m (6 ft 5 in)

Head coach

- (Jordan) Abdel Salam Saleh

Legend

- (C) Team captain
- Injured
