= Al-Jubaiha SC =

Professional basketball club from Amman

- Nickname: الأزرق; Al-Azraq (The Blue)
- Leagues: Jordanian Premier Basketball League
- Founded: 1977
- History: Al-Jubaiha; 1977–present
- Arena: Prince Hamza Hall
- Capacity: 7,500
- Location: Amman, Jordan
- Team colors
- Head coach: Saif Al-Bitar
Home	Away

Al-Jubaiha Sport Club (Arabic: النادي الجبيهة الرياضي) is a Jordanian sports club based in Al-Jubeiha, Amman. Their basketball team competes in the Jordanian Premier Basketball League, the top-tier competition of Jordanian basketball.

== Players ==
=== Current roster ===
Note: Flags indicate national team eligibility at FIBA-sanctioned events. Players may hold other non-FIBA nationalities not displayed.

Al-Jubaiha roster
Players
Coaches

Pos.	No.	Nat.	Name	Ht.
F	24	(United Kingdom)	Joshua Apple	1.97 m (6 ft 6 in)
G		(Turkey)	Emir Eid	2.00 m (6 ft 7 in)
F		(Palestine)	Yousef Alba'beish	2.00 m (6 ft 7 in)
		(Jordan)	Nabeel Abu Shreikh
C		(Jordan)	Mahmoud Hazaymeh	2.05 m (6 ft 9 in)
PG		(Jordan)	Mitri Bosheh	1.80 m (5 ft 11 in)
G		(Jordan)	Ali Kanaan	1.87 m (6 ft 2 in)
SG		(Jordan)	Omar Abu Shreikh	1.82 m (6 ft 0 in)

Head coach

- (Jordan) Saif Al-Bitar

Legend

- (C) Team captain
- Injured
