= Al Riyadi Amman =

- Leagues: Jordanian Premier Basketball League
- Founded: 2001
- History: Al Riyadi Aramex; 2001–present
- Arena: Prince Hamza Hall
- Capacity: 7,500
- Location: Amman, Jordan
- Team colors
- Main sponsor: Aramex
Home	Away

Al Riyadi Aramex Basketball Club (Arabic: النادي الرياضي أرامكس) is a Jordanian professional basketball club that competes in the Jordanian Premier Basketball League and are based in Amman, Jordan. In the team's inaugural season in 2001–02, they competed in the Jordanian Division II league, winning the championship and the Jordanian Cup, and earned a promotion to the Division I league for the 2002–03 season. Before 2001, Aramex sponsored Al-Jazeera Basketball Club for 13 years. Aramex split with Al-Jazeera and established Al-Riyadi in 2001.

== Players ==
=== Current roster ===
Note: Flags indicate national team eligibility at FIBA-sanctioned events. Players may hold other non-FIBA nationalities not displayed.

Al Riyadi Amman roster
Players
Coaches

Pos.	No.	Nat.	Name	Ht.
PG	1	(Jordan)	Adham Dajani	1.80 m (5 ft 11 in)
SG	4	(Jordan)	Munir Idais	1.90 m (6 ft 3 in)
SF	7	(Jordan)	Ibrahim Hatami	1.90 m (6 ft 3 in)
F	10	(Jordan)	Ahmad Obeid	1.98 m (6 ft 6 in)
F	11	(Jordan)	Yazan Al-Taweel	1.88 m (6 ft 2 in)
C	12	(Jordan)	Yousef Abuwazaneh	2.01 m (6 ft 7 in)
G/F	13	(Jordan)	Nader Suleiman	1.88 m (6 ft 2 in)
PG	17	(Jordan)	Talal Beytmoni	1.93 m (6 ft 4 in)
PG	22	(Jordan)	Malek Kanaan	1.83 m (6 ft 0 in)
F	23	(Jordan)	Nabil Katkhuda	2.03 m (6 ft 8 in)
G/F	32	(United States)	Brandon Spearman	1.90 m (6 ft 3 in)
C	33	(Jordan)	Moussa Mutleq	2.03 m (6 ft 8 in)

Head coach

- (Jordan) Faisal Al-Nsour

Legend

- (C) Team captain
- Injured

== Records ==
=== Division I league ===
- Jordanian Division I league champion: 2017, 2016 & 1997 (under Jazeera Aramex)

=== Division II league ===
- Jordanian Division II league champion: 2002

=== Jordanian Cup ===
- Jordanian Cup winner: 2002, 2012, 2013

=== Jordanian Super Cup ===
Winner: 2003

=== WABA Champions Cup ===
- 1998: Runners-up (under Jazeera Aramex)
- 2003: 4th
- 2006: Quarter-finalist
- 2007: 8th
- 2011: 8th

=== Dubai International Tournament ===
2013: 4th

=== ASU Tournament ===
2009: 3rd
