= Jubeiha area =

Jubeiha الجبيهة
- Area
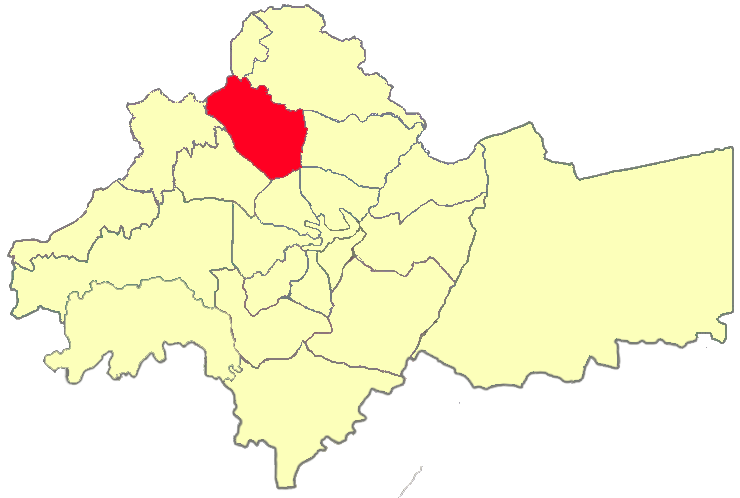
- Location of the district in Amman
- Interactive map of Jubeiha
- Coordinates: 32°1′14″N 35°53′42″E
- Country: Jordan
- Governorate: Amman Governorate
- Time zone: UTC+3

Al-Jubeiha (الجبيهة) is a city district and one of twenty-two Districts of the Greater Amman Municipality in Jordan. Al-Jubeiha has seven neighborhoods: Al-Jama'a, Al-Rasheed, Qurneh, Al-Sadiq, Al-Zaitounah, Al-Mahabah, and Al-Baladiyat.

== History ==
Rujm el-Jebeha, an archeological site in Al-Jubeiha, includes the remains of an Ammonite fortified tower similar to the Rujm Al-Malfouf. It has been suggested that Rujm el-Jebeha was the site of biblical Jogbehah, and the modern-day district preserves its ancient name.

== Education ==
Jubeiha hosts several higher education institutions, including the University of Jordan, the Royal Scientific Society and the Princess Sumaya University for Technology). It supports several schools, such as Jubeiha school and Al Jami'a schools group.

It is home to the Ministry of Higher Education and Scientific Research.

== Amenities ==
Jubeiha has a pedestrian area located opposite the University of Jordan's North Gate. The major attractions include cafes and the University Mall.

In 2018, plans were announced to develop the former Jubeiha Amusement City site into a gated park.

The area contains a red-light district commonly nicknamed "Talaini" (طلّعني) street, or "pick-me-up" street. Residents have engaged in various efforts to reduce the amount of prostitution there.

== Geography ==
The district is located in western Amman, Jordan.
