= Al-Hassan Hall =

Indoor arena in Irbid, Jordan

Al-Hassan Hall صالة الحسن
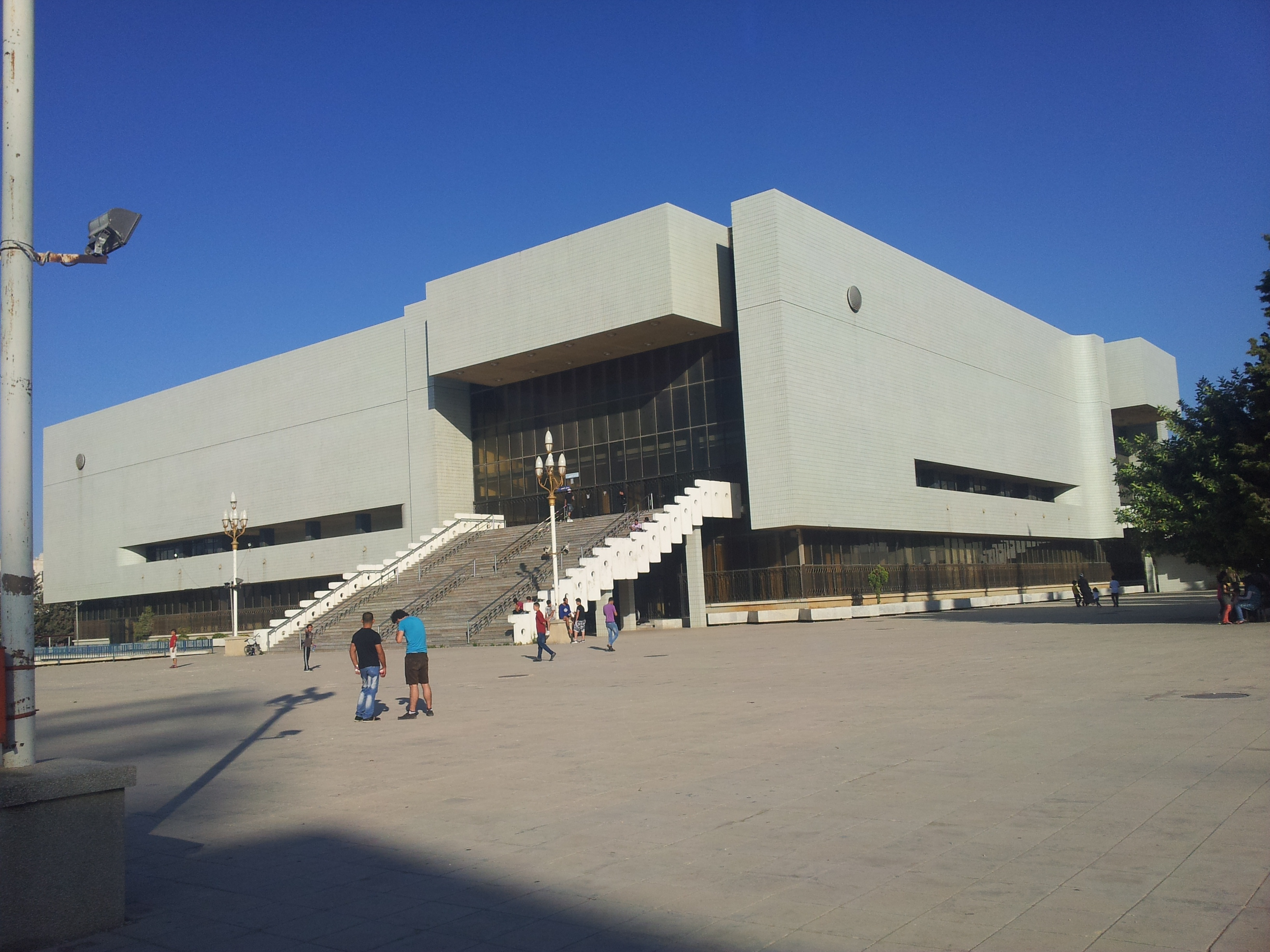
- Interactive map of Al-Hassan Hall صالة الحسن
- Full name: Al-Hassan Hall
- Location: Irbid, Jordan
- Coordinates: 32.536334°N 35.861831°E
- Owner: Government of Jordan
- Operator: Higher Council of Youth
- Capacity: 2,000

Construction
- Opened: 1990

Tenants
- Al-Ashrafieh; Al-Jalil; Shabab Bushra; Kafr Yuba

Al-Hassan Hall (Arabic: صالة الحسن) is an indoor arena located in Al-Hasan Sport City, Irbid, Jordan. The arena has a capacity of 2,000. It hosts indoor sporting events such as basketball, volleyball and handball, and has hosted the home matches of various Irbid-based clubs, such as Al-Ashrafieh, Al-Jalil, Shabab Bushra and Kafr Yuba.

== See also ==
- Al-Hassan Stadium
