= Al-Wehdat SC (basketball) =

Professional basketball club from Amman

Al-Wehdat
- Nickname: المارد الأخضر (The Green Giant)
- Leagues: Jordanian Premier Basketball League
- Founded: 10 March 1956
- History: Al-Wehdat; 1956–present
- Arena: Prince Hamza Hall
- Capacity: 7,500
- Location: Amman, Jordan
- Team colors
- Chairman: Bashar Al-Hawamdeh
- Head coach: Antonios Doukas
- Championships: Premier League (2)
- Website: https://wehdatclub.jo/
Home	Away

Al-Wehdat Sports Club (Arabic: نادي الوحدات كرة السلة) is a Jordanian basketball club based in Amman. They currently compete in the Jordanian Premier Basketball League, the top flight of Jordanian basketball.

== Players ==
=== Roster ===
Note: Flags indicate national team eligibility at FIBA-sanctioned events. Players may hold other non-FIBA nationalities not displayed.

Al-Wehdat roster
Players
Coaches

Pos.	No.	Nat.	Name	Ht.
G		(Jordan)	Ashraf Al-Hendi	1.90 m (6 ft 3 in)
C		(Jordan)	Mohammad Ghunaim	2.08 m (6 ft 10 in)
F		(Jordan)	Shaker Al-Okush	1.93 m (6 ft 4 in)
PF/C		(Russia)	Alexander Kurbatov	2.08 m (6 ft 10 in)
SG		(Jordan)	Akef Al Shiyab	1.88 m (6 ft 2 in)
C		(Jordan)	Yousef Al-Awamleh	2.00 m (6 ft 7 in)
F		(Jordan)	Raad Barhoush	1.98 m (6 ft 6 in)
F		(Jordan)	Ahmad Qaramseh	1.95 m (6 ft 5 in)
PF		(Jordan)	Basil Abu Aboud	2.00 m (6 ft 7 in)
C		(Jordan)	Abdallah Al-Okosh	2.06 m (6 ft 9 in)
PF		(Jordan)	Mohammad Zaghab	1.95 m (6 ft 5 in)
G		(Jordan)	Mahmoud Abdeen	1.91 m (6 ft 3 in)
C		(Jordan)	Yousef Al-Awamleh	2.00 m (6 ft 7 in)
G		(Jordan)	Malek Kanaan	1.82 m (6 ft 0 in)

Head coach

- (Greece) Antonios Doukas

Legend

- (C) Team captain
- Injured

== Honours ==
=== Domestic ===
- Jordanian Premier Basketball League
  - Winners (2): 2019, 2021–22
