= Jordanian Premier Basketball League =

Jordanian Premier Basketball League (JPL)
- Organising body: Jordan Basketball Federation
- Founded: 1952; 74 years ago
- First season: 1952
- Country: Jordan
- Confederation: FIBA Asia (Asia)
- Number of teams: 8
- Level on pyramid: 1
- Relegation to: First Division League
- Domestic cup: Jordan Cup
- Supercup: Jordan Super Cup
- International cup(s): Basketball Champions League Asia; FIBA West Asia Super League; Arab Club Basketball Championship
- Current champions: Amman United (2nd title) (2025–26)
- Most championships: Al-Ahli; Orthodox (25 titles)
- TV partners: JRTV; Jordan Sport via Facebook
- Website: Jordan Basketball Federation official website
- 2025–26 Jordanian Premier Basketball League

The Jordanian Premier Basketball League (Arabic: الدوري الأردني الممتاز لكرة السلة) is a professional basketball league in Jordan. It is the top league in the country with the second-tier league going by the name of the Jordanian First Division League.

== Teams ==
2025–26 Jordanian Premier Basketball League season
Team	City
Al-Ashrafieh	Irbid
Al-Faisaly	Amman
Al-Jalil	Irbid
Al-Jubaiha	Amman (Al Jubeha)
Al-Wehdat	Amman
Amman United	Amman
Inglizia	Amman
Shabab Bushra	Irbid

=== Map ===
Location of clubs in Jordan for the 2025–26 Jordanian Premier Basketball League

== Main arenas ==
The league games are played either in Prince Hamza Hall in Amman, or Al-Hassan Hall in Irbid.

== Clubs ==
=== Champions ===
Number	Season	Champion
1	1952	Jordanian Electricity Club
2	1953	Al-Ahli
3	1954	Al-Ahli
4	1955	Al-Ahli
5	1956	Al-Ahli
6	1957	Al-Ahli
7	1958	Al-Ahli
8	1959	Orthodox
9	1960	Al-Ahli
10	1961	Al-Ahli
11	1962	Al-Ahli
12	1963	Al Watani
13	1964	Al Jazeera
14	1965	Al-Ahli
15	1966	Jordan Club
-	1967	Not Held
16	1968	Al-Ahli
17	1969	Al-Ahli
18	1970	Al-Ahli
19	1971	Al-Ahli
20	1972	Al-Ahli
21	1973	Orthodox
22	1974	Al-Ahli
23	1975	Al-Ahli
24	1976	Orthodox
25	1977	Orthodox
26	1978	Orthodox
27	1979	Orthodox
-	1980	Not Held
28	1981	Orthodox
29	1982	Orthodox
30	1983	Orthodox
31	1984	Orthodox
32	1985	Orthodox
33	1986	Orthodox
34	1987	Orthodox
35	1988	Orthodox
36	1989	Orthodox
37	1990	Al-Ahli
38	1991	Orthodox
39	1992	Al-Ahli
40	1993	Al-Ahli
41	1994	Al-Ahli
42	1995	Orthodox
43	1996	Orthodox
44	1997	Al Jazeera Aramex
45	1998	Orthodox
46	1999	Orthodox
47	2000	Orthodox
48	2001	Orthodox
49	2002	Orthodox
50	2003	Zain (Fastlink)
51	2004	Zain (Fastlink)
52	2005	Zain (Fastlink)
53	2006	Zain (Fastlink)
54	2007	Zain
55	2008	Zain
56	2009	ASU
57	2010	ASU
58	2011	Orthodox
59	2012	ASU
60	2013	ASU
61	2014	Orthodox
62	2015	Al Riyadi Aramex
63	2016	Al Riyadi Aramex
64	2017	Al Ahli (Ranking League)
65	2018	Al-Ahli
66	2019	Al Wehdat
67	2020	Al-Ahli
68	2021–22	Al Wehdat
69	2022–23	Al-Ahli
-	2023–24	Not Held
70	2024–25	Amman United
71	2025–26	Amman United

==== Wins by club ====
Team	Wins
Orthodox; 25	1959, 1973, 1976, 1977, 1978, 1979, 1981, 1982, 1983, 1984, 1985, 1986, 1987, 1988, 1989, 1991, 1995, 1996, 1998, 1999, 2000, 2001, 2002, 2011, 2014
Al-Ahli; 25	1953, 1954, 1955, 1956, 1957, 1958, 1960, 1961, 1962, 1965, 1968, 1969, 1970, 1971, 1972, 1974, 1975, 1990, 1992, 1993, 1994, 2017, 2018, 2020, 2022–23
Zain (Fastlink); 6	2003, 2004, 2005, 2006, 2007, 2008
ASU; 4	2009, 2010, 2012, 2013
Al Wehdat; 2	2019, 2021–22
Al Riyadi Aramex; 2	2015, 2016
Al-Jazeera; 2	1964, 1997
Amman United; 2	2024–25, 2025–26
Jordan Club; 1	1966
Al Watani; 1	1963
Jordanian Electricity Club; 1	1952

== Performance by club ==
Clubs	Championships
Orthodox	25
Al-Ahli	25
Zain (Fastlink)	6
ASU	4
Al Wehdat	2
Al Riyadi Aramex	2
Al Jazeera	2
Amman United	2
Jordan Club	1
Al Watani	1
Jordanian Electricity Club	1
