= Prince Hamza Hall =

Indoor arena in Amman, Jordan

Prince Hamza Hall صالة الامير حمزة
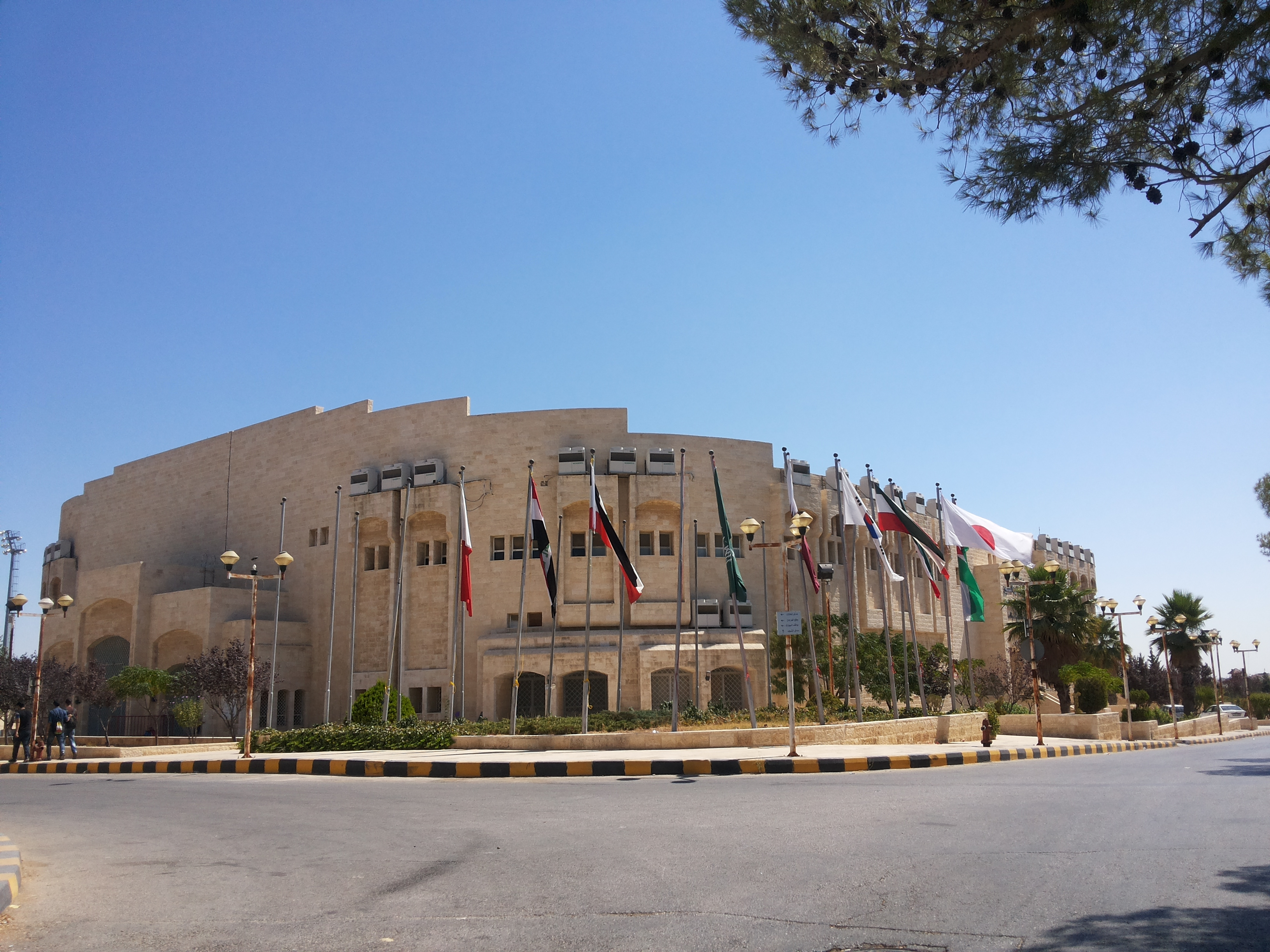
- Interactive map of Prince Hamza Hall صالة الامير حمزة
- Full name: Prince Hamza Hall
- Location: Amman, Jordan
- Coordinates: 31.980235°N 35.906398°E
- Owner: Government of Jordan
- Operator: Higher Council of Youth
- Capacity: 6,000

Construction
- Opened: 1999

Tenants
- Jordan men's national basketball team Jordan women's national basketball team

Prince Hamza Hall (Arabic: صالة الامير حمزة), also known as Prince Hamzah Sport Hall, is an indoor arena located in Al-Hussein City, Amman, Jordan. The arena has a capacity of 6,000. It primarily hosts basketball matches, as it serves the home of the Jordan national basketball team.

== See also ==
- Amman International Stadium
- Polo Stadium
