= Al-Ahli SC Basketball =

Professional basketball club from Amman

Al-Ahli Amman
- Nickname: الليث الأبيض; The White Lions
- Leagues: Jordanian Premier Basketball League
- Founded: 1953
- History: Al-Ahli; 1953–present
- Arena: Prince Hamza Hall
- Capacity: 7,500
- Location: Amman, Jordan
- Team colors
- Main sponsor: Investbank
- Chairman: Sameer Omar Husni Soubar
- President: Sameer Omar Husni Soubar
- Vice-president: Evan Issa Mahmoud Aiy
- Head coach: Zaid Al-Khas
- Championships: Premier League (25); Jordan Cup (4)
- Website: https://www.ahliclub.jo/
Home	Away

Al-Ahli Sport Club (Arabic: النادي الأهلي كرة السلة الأردني), also known simply as Al-Ahli or Al-Ahli Amman, is a Jordanian basketball club based in Amman.

== History ==
Established in 1944, Al-Ahli is considered to be one of the oldest sports clubs in Jordan. Represented by the Circassian community under the initial name of Koban Club, their current name was honourably given by the late king Abdullah Bin al Hussein I. It launched its basketball program in 1953, making Al-Ahli the first Jordanian club to do so.

== Players ==
=== Current roster ===
Note: Flags indicate national team eligibility at FIBA-sanctioned events. Players may hold other non-FIBA nationalities not displayed.

Al-Ahli roster
Players
Coaches

Pos.	No.	Nat.	Name	Ht.
PG		(Jordan)	Nabeel Abu Ishraikh	1.80 m (5 ft 11 in)
C	55	(Jordan)	Mohammad Naser Ghunaim	2.04 m (6 ft 8 in)
F/C		(Jordan)	Said Al Khawaldeh	2.00 m (6 ft 7 in)
G		(Jordan)	Basil Alkhawaldeh	1.87 m (6 ft 2 in)
F		(Jordan)	Yazan Al Taweel	1.94 m (6 ft 4 in)
PF	14	(Jordan)	Khaled Abuaboud	2.03 m (6 ft 8 in)
G	6	(Jordan)	Ashraf Alhendi	1.90 m (6 ft 3 in)
F		(United States)	Jamail Jones	2.01 m (6 ft 7 in)
F		(Jordan) (United States)	Zane Najdawi	2.01 m (6 ft 7 in)
G		(Jordan)	Yazeed Hijazi	1.80 m (5 ft 11 in)
F		(Jordan)	Mahmoud Diab	1.94 m (6 ft 4 in)
		(Jordan)	Sultan Louzi

Head coach

- (Jordan) Zaid Al-Khas

Legend

- (C) Team captain
- Injured

== Honours ==
=== Domestic ===
- Jordanian Premier Basketball League
  - Winners (25): 1953, 1954, 1955, 1956, 1957, 1958, 1960, 1961, 1962, 1965, 1968, 1969, 1970, 1971, 1972, 1974, 1975, 1990, 1992, 1993, 1994, 2017, 2018, 2020, 2022–23
- Jordan Cup
  - Winners (4): 2018, 2019, 2020, 2021

== Records ==
=== West Asia Super League ===
- 2023–24: Withdrew

=== ABC Champions Cup ===
- 1995: Fourth-place
