= Orthodox Club =

Orthodox
- Nickname: The Leaders
- League: Jordanian Premier Basketball League
- Founded: 1952
- History: Orthodox Club; 1952–present
- Arena: Emile & Mary Haddad Sports Hall
- Capacity: 3,000
- Location: Abdoun, Amman, Jordan
- Chairman: Michael Sayegh
- Team manager: Fadi Sabat
- Head coach: Zaid Al-Sahouri
- Championships: Premier League (24); Jordan Cup (7); Super Cup (1); WABA Champions Cup (1)
Home	Away

Orthodox Club (Arabic: النادي الأرثوذكسي), also known simply as Orthodox or Orthodox Amman, is a multi-sports club based in Amman. The team was first established in Jaffa, Palestine in 1924, and was re-established in Jordan in 1952 after its members fled the displacement of the Arab–Israeli War. They are mainly known for their basketball team and compete in the Jordanian Premier Basketball League, where they are tied for most wins to date. Their most recent win was in 2015.

The club has an associated women's football team.

== Honours ==
=== Domestic ===
- Jordanian Premier Basketball League
  - Winners (24): 1959, 1973, 1976, 1977, 1978, 1979, 1981, 1982, 1984, 1985, 1986, 1987, 1988, 1989, 1991, 1995, 1996, 1998, 1999, 2000, 2001, 2002, 2011, 2014
- Jordan Cup
  - Winners (7): 1982, 1987, 2000, 2001, 2008, 2015, 2022
- Jordan Super Cup
  - Winners (1): 2002

=== Continental ===
As of 21 December 2022

- WABA Champions Cup
  - Winners (1): 1999
- Antranik International Tournament
  - Winners (1): 1991
- Al-Dustur International Tournament
  - Winners (1): 1992
- Sagesse International Tournament
  - Winners (1): 1993

== Players ==
=== Current roster ===
Note: Flags indicate national team eligibility at FIBA-sanctioned events. Players may hold other non-FIBA nationalities not displayed.

Orthodox Club roster
Players
Coaches

Pos.	No.	Nat.	Name	Ht.
		(Jordan)	Mohammad Al Shamali
F/C		(United States)	Gregoryshon Magee	2.11 m (6 ft 11 in)
PG		(Jordan)	Adham Dajani	1.79 m (5 ft 10 in)
C		(Jordan)	Mahmoud Hazaymeh	2.05 m (6 ft 9 in)
G		(Jordan)	Ali Kanaan	1.87 m (6 ft 2 in)
F		(Jordan)	Nabil Katkhuda	2.06 m (6 ft 9 in)
G		(Jordan)	Zaid Khoury	1.90 m (6 ft 3 in)
G		(Jordan)	Saif Abusalem	1.88 m (6 ft 2 in)
SG		(Jordan)	Omar Salman	1.70 m (5 ft 7 in)
PF		(Jordan)	Mohammad Zaghab	1.95 m (6 ft 5 in)
		(Jordan)	Yanal Abu Shuheil
G		(Jordan)	Malek Kanaan	1.82 m (6 ft 0 in)

Head coach

- (Jordan) Zaid Al-Sahouri

Legend

- (C) Team captain
- Injured

== Records ==
As of 21 December 2022

=== West Asia Super League ===
- 2023: Qualification to semi-finals

=== WABA Champions Cup ===
- 1999: Winners
- 2000: 4th place
- 2001: Runners-up
- 2002: Runners-up
- 2004: 4th place
- 2008: 5th place
- 2009: 6th place
- 2016: 6th place

=== Asia Champions Cup ===
- 1988: 5th place
- 1996: 7th place
- 1999: 6th place

=== Arab Club Basketball Championship ===
- 1978: Runners-up
- 1990: 4th place
- 2002: 5th place
- 2008: 4th place

=== Al Midan Intl Tournament ===
- 1993: Runners-up

=== Al Assad Intl Tournament ===
- 1995: Runners-up

=== Jordan Intl Tournament ===
- 2000: Runners-up

=== Al Hariri Tournament ===
- 2007: Semi Final

=== Damascus International Tournament ===
- 2007: Semi Final
