= 2021–22 Syrian Basketball League season =

64th season of the premier Syrian basketball league

Syrian Basketball League
- Season: 2021–22
- Duration: 9 December 2021 – 6 May 2022; 18 May 2021 – 13 June 2022 (Playoffs)
- Games played: 22
- Teams: 12
- TV partner(s): Sama TV; Syria TV

Regular season
- Top seed: Al Wahda SC
- Relegated: Al-Thawra; Al-Fayhaa

Finals
- Champions: Al-Ittihad SC Aleppo (20th title)
- Runners-up: Al-Karamah SC Homs
- Semifinalists: Al-Jalaa SC; Al-Wahda SC
- Finals MVP: (Algeria) Mohamed Harat
- All statistics correct as of 13 June 2022.

The 2021–22 SBL season is the 64th season of the premier Syrian Basketball League and the 2nd season under the current play-off format. In the regular season, teams play against each other home-and-away in a round-robin format. The matchdays were from 9 December 2021 to 6 May 2022.

Al-Karamah SC was the defending champion which was swept by Al-Ittihad in the finals. Al-Ittihad won their 20th title earning their first title since the 2005–06 season.

== Clubs ==
Huteen SC and Al-Fayhaa are promoted to SBL, replacing Al-Yarmouk and Ouroube SC.

- 2021–22 teams:
Locations of teams in the Syrian Basketball League 2021–22

Team	City	Venue
Jalaa SC	Aleppo	Al-Assad Sports Arena
Al-Ittihad SC	Aleppo	Al-Hamadaniah Sports Arena
Al-Hurriya SC	Aleppo	Al-Assad Sports Arena
Al-Jaish SC	Damascus	Al-Fayhaa Arena
Al Wahda SC	Damascus	Al-Fayhaa Arena
Al-Fayhaa	Damascus	Al-Fayhaa Arena
Al-Thawra SC	Damascus	Al-Fayhaa Arena
Al-Karamah SC	Homs	Ghazwan Abu Zaid Arena
Al-Wathba SC	Homs	Ghazwan Abu Zaid Arena
Al-Nawair SC	Hama	Naseh al-Wani Arena
Al-Taliya SC	Hama	Naseh al-Wani Arena
Huteen SC	Latakia	Latakia Sports Arena

== Regular season ==
Pos	Team	Pld	W	L	PF	PA	PD	Pts	Qualification
1	Al Wahda SC	22	21	1	1747	1301	+446	43	Qualification to Playoffs
2	Al-Ittihad SC	22	20	2	1999	1272	+727	42	Qualification to Playoffs
3	Al-Jalaa	22	16	6	1439	1265	+174	38	Qualification to Playoffs
4	Al-Karamah SC	22	15	7	1931	1532	+399	37	Qualification to Playoffs
5	Al-Jaish SC	22	15	7	1814	1467	+347	37	
6	Al-Wathba SC	22	13	9	1722	1685	+37	35	
7	Al-Nawair	22	12	10	1516	1487	+29	34	
8	Al-Taliya SC	22	7	15	1457	1704	−247	29	
9	Al-Hurriya	22	6	16	1492	1716	−224	28	
10	Huteen SC	22	3	19	1973	2105	−132	25	
11	Al-Thawra (R)	22	3	19	1326	1803	−477	25	Relegation to 2nd Division
12	Al-Fayhaa (R)	22	2	20	1214	1910	−696	24	Relegation to 2nd Division

Updated to match(es) played on 6 May 2022. Source: goalzz.com
(R) Relegated

== Play-offs ==
The SBL playoffs semifinals and finals were best of five formats. The play off started on 18 May 2022 and ended on 13 June 2022.

Semifinals
1	Al-Wahda	82	74	77	70	84
4	Al-Karamah	75	89	69	77	90
2	Al-Ittihad	83	66	66	74	–
3	Al-Jalaa	67	68	55	69	–

Finals
4	Al-Karamah	56	73	68	–	–
2	Al-Ittihad	73	79	77	–	–

=== Finals ===
The higher-seeded team played the first, second and fifth leg (if necessary) at home.

Team 1	Series	Team 2	Game 1	Game 2	Game 3	Game 4	Game 5
Al-Ittihad Aleppo	3–0	Al-Karamah Homs	73–56	79–73	77–68		

== Winning roster ==
- Al-Ittihad Aleppo 2021–22 roster
  - Coach : Fuad Abou Chakra
  - Players : Anthony Bakar, Nadim Issa, Wael Jlilaty, Ali Diarbakerli, Antwan Scott, Isaac Oubeid, Jamil Sadir, Abdulwahab Al-Hamwi, Mohamed Harat, Michael Madanly, Saleh Tofek

== Syrian clubs in Asian/Arab competitions ==
- FIBA Asia Champions Cup: Cancelled
- West Asia Super League: Al-Ittihad SC, Al-Karamah SC
- Arab Club Basketball Championship: Al-Ittihad SC
