= Al-Jaish SC Syria (men's basketball) =

Syrian basketball club

Al-Jaish Sports Club
- Nickname: Army (Arabic: جيش)
- Leagues: Syrian Basketball League
- Founded: 1947
- History: Al-Jaish Damascus; 1947–present
- Arena: Al-Fayhaa Arena (capacity: 6000)
- Location: Damascus, Syria
- Team colors: Red and White
- Main sponsor: Sinalco
- President: (Syria) Gen. Mohsen Abbas
- Head coach: Hadi Haj Darwish
- 2021–22 position: Syrian League, 5th of 12
- Championships: (7) Syrian Basketball League (9) Syrian Basketball Cup
Home	Away

Al-Jaish active sections
Football	Basketball

Al-Jaish Sports Club (Arabic: نادي الجيش الرياضي) is a Syrian professional basketball club. It is a part of the Al-Jaish Sports Club, which is based in Damascus, Syria. Al Jaish is with seven SBL titles and three Syrian Cup victories one of the best clubs in Syria.

== History ==
The club was founded in 1947 in Damascus as a sports division of the Syrian Army.

The club did not make a significant impact until 2003, when it advanced to the Syrian Cup finals for the first time. The club achieved its first major success in the 2004 season, advancing to the SBL final 6, defeating Jalaa SC. In the following season of 2005, the club placed second in the group stage, advancing to the final group, which they won after a key winning match with Al-Ittihad (73–65) and became the SBL champion and defended the title.

In 2005, the club also participated in the WABA Cup for the first time, where, after winning over Al-Shabab (98–51) and Al-Hillah, it placed 4th and advanced to the FIBA Asia Champions Cup.

In the 2005 FIBA Asia Champions Cup group stage, Al Jaish first lost to Kuwait SC 85–89, Fastlink SC 78–94 and Al-Rayyan 54–79. The victory over Sharjah 75–63 was enough to advance to the quarterfinals. The team led by Tony Rutland and John Carter lost to the Saba Battery 65–76 in the quarterfinals and in the match for 5th place with San Miguel 57–73. In the match for the final 7th place, Al Jaish defeated Tobol Kostanay 77–71.

In the 2006 season, they participated in the WABA League, in which they advanced to the quarterfinals, where they lost to Saba Battery. In the same 2006 season, they also participated in the Dubai Cup, where they were eliminated in the quarterfinals after losing to the Riyadi SC 83–94.

After the 2007 season, when they finished third in the SBL, they reached the final group in the 2008 season, where they were defeated by Al-Jalaa. In the 2009 season, after winning over the city rival Wahda, they reached the SBL final, where Al-Jalaa defeated them in all three matches. In the same season, he also presented himself at the Dubai International Championship, where he was eliminated by Riyadi SC 85–77 as in the previous participation. They also won the Damascus Championship after defeating Al-Wahda 96–91.

In the 2010 season, under the leadership of coach Imad Othman and with players such as Christien Charles, Abdullah Hakam or Nour al Saman, they advanced to the playoffs, where they gradually defeated Talyia, the main rival Al-Wahda, and reached the SBL finals. In the first match of the final series, they lost to Al-Jalaa 96–104, but after winning the second (77–74) and third match (92–88), they became the SBL champions.

In the 2011 season, they advanced to the playoffs from second place in the group stage. In it, they defeated Al-Ittihad (2:1) and Al-Wahda (2:0) and advanced to the finals, where they were defeated by Jalaa. They also participated in the 2011 WABA Cup, where they finished second in the group stage, but lost to the Al-Ryiadi 87–94 and 63–84 in the quarterfinals.

In the SBL semi-final in the 2012 season, Al-Jaish was eliminated thanks to Jalaa after losing 73–83 and 69–81 and took 3rd place. The team returned the loss to the Jalaa club in the Syrian Cup final, where they defeated it 78–71.

In the 2013 season, the league was canceled due to the war in the country, so the club only participated in the WABA Cup. In the group stage of the WABA Cup, the club unfortunately lost to all opponents, including Champville SC, and finished in seventh place.

In the 2014 season, after a failure in the league (3rd place), they participated in the FIBA Asia Champions Cup. In the group stage, they lost to Foolad Mahan Isfahan BC 56–91, Al Hala 89–106 and ASU 71–90, but still advanced to the quarter-finals. In it, they lost to Al-Rayyan 71–82, but in the fight for fifth place, they finally won over Kapchagay 82–77 and lost to Duhok 95–97.

After the 2015 season, as in the previous one, they had third place in the league and participation in the WABA Cup quarterfinals, where they were defeated by Mahram Tehran BC 106–59.

In the 2016 season, the Great Era of the Al-Jaish began, as the team, led by coach Khaled Abo Touk, won the Double for the first time. They won the SBL after the sovereign defeat of Al-Ittihad Aleppo in the semi-finals, and in the final they met Al-Karamah SC, which they defeated in all three matches (77–62, 84–73, 87–79) and became Syrian champions. They also won the Syrian Cup after winning over Ittihad.

The following 2017 season, they also managed to win the league title, but lost in the Syrian Cup in the quarterfinals with Al-Wahda. As a result, they managed to advance to the WABA Cup, in which they finished in fourth place after losing to Petrochimi BC, Riyadi and Ramallah. In the next course of the 2018 season, they managed to defend the title.

In the SBL playoffs 2019, a team led by players such as Rami Merjaneh and Abdulwahab Al-Hamwi managed to beat Hurriya Aleppo SC 2:0 (81–70, 87–55) and then Al-Ittihad SC Aleppo 2:0 (72–71, 77–74) and advance to the finals. In the SBL final, they managed to beat Al-Jalaa Aleppo 3:1 (81–45, 73–80 and 72–64) and defend the league title. It was their fourth title in a row, so they set a new club record. They also managed to beat Al-Wathba 81–59 in the Syrian Cup final. These successes also ended the Great Era.

In the WABA Cup, they finished in fourth place, losing to Petrochimi 73–93, Al-Naft 60–88 and Chemidor 55–80 respectively. They recorded their only victory with a clear defeat of BC Kalendia 84–67.

The following 2020 season had to be canceled due to the COVID-19 pandemic, but this decision unfortunate hit the club as they advanced to the SBL semi-finals. The club was also marked by the elimination in Syrian Cup quarterfinals.

In the 2021 season, they advanced to the semi-finals of the playoffs, where they played a tied series with Al-Wahda, but eventually lost just 1:2 (in matches). They also lost in the Cup final with Al-Jalaa 44–59.

In the 2022 season, Al-Jaish SC finished fourth in the Syrian Super Cup and fifth in the Syrian league.

== Home arena ==
- Al-Fayhaa Sports Arena: 1976–present
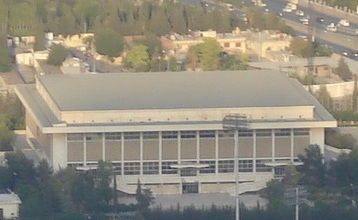
Al-Fayhaa Sports Arena

Al Jaish plays its home games at the Fayhaa Sport Arena, located in the Salihiyah district, Damascus and is owned by the Syrian government. It has a capacity of 6000 seats.

== Club rivalries ==
Al-Jaish plays the biggest Derby in Damascus and one of the biggest in the country against their main rival Al-Wahda SC.

== Honours ==
=== Domestic ===
- Syrian Basketball League
  - Winners (7): 2004 – 2005 – 2010 – 2016 – 2017 – 2018 – 2019
  - Runners-up (3): 2008 – 2009 – 2011
- Syrian Basketball Cup
  - Winners (9): 1989 - 1997-1999 - 2008 - 2010 - 2012 – 2016 – 2018 - 2019 - 2023
  - Runners-up (3): 2003 – 2004 – 2021
- Damascus Basketball Championship
  - Winners (1): 2009
  - Runners-up (1): 2005

=== Asian ===
- FIBA Asia Champions Cup
  - Sixth place: 2013
  - Seventh place: 2005
- WABA Champions Cup
  - Fourth place: 2005 – 2018 – 2019
  - Quarterfinals: 2006 – 2011 – 2014

=== Arab ===
- Arab Club Basketball Championship
  - Group stage (1): 2005
- Dubai International Championship
  - Quarterfinals (2): 2006 – 2009

== Sponsorship ==
- As of 2022:

Official Shirt Sponsor	Sinalco
Official Sport Clothing Manufacturer	Diadora
Official Broadcaster	SYRTV

== Current roster ==
Squad for the 2021–2022 Syrian Basketball League season:

Al-Jaish roster
Players
Coaches

Pos.	No.	Nat.	Name
PG	00	(Syria)	Khalel Khori
F	1	(Syria)	Abdullah al-Hakam
PG	10	(Syria)	Rami Merjaneh
C	12	(Syria)	Manar Hamad
PF	23	(Syria)	Ammar Safour
PF	26	(Syria)	Imad Hasaballah

Head coach

Hadi Haj Darwish

Legend

- (C) Team captain
- Injured

- Roster
Updated: 5 January 2022

Note: Flags indicate national team eligibility at FIBA-sanctioned events. Players may hold other non-FIBA nationalities not displayed.

== Past rosters ==
- 2011–2012 Roster:

Number	Player	Position	Height (cm)	Age
6	(Syria) Abdullah Hakam	FW	199	30
7	(Syria) Nour Al Saman	SG	189	34
8	(Syria) Watche Nalabandian	PG	184	29
12	(Syria) Abdulwahab Al-Hamwi	C	175	29
15	(Syria) Muhia Kassaballi	C	208	28
TBD	(Syria) Omar Karkoukly	G	188	31
TBD	(Syria) Soumer Khoury (c)	FW	195	30

== Transfers ==
Transfers for the 2021–22 season:

Joining

- (Palestine) Al Hakam Abdullah from (Syria) Al-Wahda SC

Leaving

- (Saudi Arabia) Ahmed Abdullah to (Saudi Arabia) Al Nasr Riyadh
- (Syria) Alaa Al Idlibi to (Syria) Al-Wahda SC
- (Syria) Hani Adribe to (Syria) Al-Wahda SC

== Notable players ==
Note: Flags indicate national team eligibility at FIBA-sanctioned events. Players may hold other non-FIBA nationalities not displayed.

Criteria

To appear in this section a player must have either:

- Set a club record or won an individual award while at the club
- Played at least one official international match for their national team at any time
- Played at least one official NBA match at any time.

Syria

- Abdulwahab Al-Hamwi

United States

- Christien Charles

== Head coaches ==
- (Australia) Brian Lester (2006–2007)
- (Syria) Imad Othman (2007–2012)
- (Syria) Haytham Jmayel (2012–2014)
- (Syria) Khaled Abo Touk (2015–2020)
- (Syria) Hadi Haj Darwish (2020–present)

== Season by season ==
Season	Tier	League	Pos.	Syrian Cup	Syrian Super Cup	Asian competitions	Pos.
2010–11	1	SBL	2nd	QF	–	WABA Cup	QF
2011–12	1	SBL	3rd	Champions	–	–	–
2012–13	1	SBL	No Championship			WABA Cup	7th
2013–14	1	SBL	3rd	–	–	Asian Cup	QF
2014–15	1	SBL	3rd	–	–	WABA Cup	QF
2015–16	1	SBL	1st	Champions	–	–	–
2016–17	1	SBL	1st	QF	–	–	–
2017–18	1	SBL	1st	–	–	WABA Cup	4th
2018–19	1	SBL	1st	Champions	–	WABA Cup	4th
2019–20	1	SBL	–	QF	No Championship		
2020–21	1	SBL	3rd	Runners-up	No Championship		
2021–22	1	SBL	5th	1st round	4th	–	–
