= West Asia Basketball Association =

West Asia Basketball Association (WABA)
- Abbreviation: WABA
- Formation: 1998
- Type: Regional sports federation
- Region served: West Asia
- Members: 7 national federations
- Parent organization: FIBA Asia
- Affiliations: FIBA
- Website: WABA

The West Asia Basketball Association (WABA) is a subzone of FIBA Asia, consisting of countries from West Asia. The WABA Champions Cup, a professional men's tournament, is a top-level club competition run by the WABA.

== Members ==
- Iran - Iranian Basketball Federation
- Iraq - Iraqi Basketball Association
- Jordan - Jordan Basketball Federation
- Lebanon - Lebanese Basketball Federation
- Palestine - Palestinian Basketball Federation
- Syria - Syrian Basketball Federation
- Yemen - Yemen Basketball Association

== Events ==
1. West Asian Men's Basketball Championship (1999–2017)
2. West Asian Women's Basketball Championship (2008–2025)
3. West Asian Men's Club Basketball Championship (1998–2019)
4. West Asian Women's Club Basketball Championship (4th was held in 2016)
5. West Asian Junior Basketball Championship (Men / Women) Since 2001 / 2014
6. West Asian Youth Basketball Championship (Men / Women)
7. West Asia Super League (Men) Since 2022
8. West Asia Super League (Women) Proposed

== National tournaments ==
=== WABA Championship ===
The WABA Championship is a tournament between the national men's basketball teams of the West Asian region. It was first held in Beirut in 1999, and the intention was to keep it once a year thereafter. Despite several years of intermittency, the tournament is now back to its annual format as intended. It serves as the West Asian qualifying tournament for the FIBA Asia Cup and FIBA Asia Challenge.

Year	Host	First place	Second place	Third place
1999	(Lebanon) Beirut	Syria	Lebanon	Jordan
2000	(Lebanon) Beirut	Lebanon	Syria	Iraq
2001	(Jordan) Amman	Syria	Lebanon	Iran
2002	(Iran) Tehran	Jordan	Iran	Iraq
2004	(Iran) Tehran	Iran	Syria	Jordan
2005	(Iran) Tehran	Iran	Lebanon	Jordan
2008	(Jordan) Amman	Lebanon	Jordan	Syria
2010	(Iraq) Duhok	Iran	Iraq	Syria
2011	(Iraq) Duhok	Iran	Jordan	Syria
2012	(Jordan) Amman	Lebanon	Iran	Jordan
2013	(Iran) Tehran	Iran	Lebanon	Jordan
2014	(Jordan) Amman	Jordan	Iran	Syria
2015	(Jordan) Amman	Lebanon	Jordan	Palestine
2016	(Jordan) Amman	Iran	Jordan	Iraq
2017	(Jordan) Amman	Lebanon	Iran	Jordan

== Club tournaments ==
=== WABA Champions Cup ===
Year	Venue	Champion	Result	Runner-up	Third place
1998	Amman, Jordan	(Lebanon) Al-Riyadi	No playoffs	(Jordan) Al-Jazeera	(Iran) Zob Ahan
1999	Amman, Jordan	(Jordan) Orthodox	No playoffs	(Iraq) Al-Quwa Al-Jawiya	(Palestine) Al-Quds
2000	Damascus, Syria	(Syria) Al-Wahda	No playoffs	(Iran) Zob Ahan	(Iraq) Al-Quwa Al-Jawiya
2001	Damascus, Syria	(Syria) Al-Wahda	No playoffs	(Jordan) Orthodox	(Syria) Al-Ittihad
2002	Beirut, Lebanon	(Lebanon) Sagesse	No playoffs	(Jordan) Orthodox	(Iraq) Al-Karkh
2003	Tehran, Iran	(Iran) Sanam	No playoffs	(Jordan) Arena	(Iran) Zob Ahan
2004	Damascus, Syria	(Lebanon) Sagesse	No playoffs	(Syria) Al-Wahda	(Iran) Sanam
2005	Amman, Jordan	(Lebanon) Sagesse	No playoffs	(Iran) Saba Battery	(Jordan) Fastlink
2006	No fixed venue	No champion	Aborted	(Iran) Saba Battery (Lebanon) Sagesse	(Syria) Al-Jalaa
2007	Aleppo, Syria	(Iran) Saba Battery	82–79	(Syria) Al-Jalaa	(Lebanon) Blue Stars
2008	Mahshahr, Iran	(Lebanon) Al-Riyadi	83–82 (OT)	(Iran) Saba Battery	(Iran) Petrochimi
2009	Amman, Jordan	(Iran) Mahram	96–85	(Jordan) Zain	(Iran) Saba Mehr
2010	Tehran, Iran	(Iran) Mahram	No playoffs	(Syria) Al-Jalaa	(Iran) Zob Ahan
2011	No fixed venue	(Lebanon) Al-Riyadi	3–2	(Syria) Al-Jalaa	(Iran) Mahram
2012	No fixed venue	(Iran) Mahram	3–2	(Lebanon) Al-Riyadi	
2013	Duhok, Iraq	(Lebanon) Champville	No playoffs	(Iran) Foolad Mahan	(Iran) Petrochimi
2014	Tehran, Iran	(Iran) Mahram	90–73	(Iran) Petrochimi	(Jordan) ASU
2016	Amman, Jordan	(Iran) Petrochimi	70–68	(Lebanon) Al-Riyadi	(Iran) Azad University
2017	Amman, Jordan	(Lebanon) Al-Riyadi	83–69	(Iran) Petrochimi	(Iran) Naft Abadan
2018	Beirut, Lebanon	(Iran) Petrochimi	No playoffs	(Lebanon) Al-Riyadi	(Palestine) Sareyyet Ramallah
2019	Baghdad, Iraq	(Iran) Chemidor	No playoffs	(Iran) Petrochimi	(Iraq) Naft Baghdad
