= Al Wahda (men's basketball) =

Men's basketball club in Damascus, Syria

Al-Wahda Sports Club
- Nickname: Damascene Orange (Arabic: البرتقالة الدمشقية)
- Leagues: Syrian Basketball League
- Founded: 1928
- History: Al-Qasioun Sports Club; 1928–1972; Al Wahda Damascus; 1972–present
- Arena: Al Fayhaa Arena (capacity: 6000); Al Wahda Club Arena (capacity: 3000)
- Location: Damascus, Syria
- Team colors: Orange and White
- Main sponsor: Lactomil
- President: (Syria) Maher Al-Sayed
- Head coach: (Lebanon) Gilbert Nasr
- 2023–24 position: Syrian League, 1st of 12
- Championships: (1) Asian Cup (2) West Asian Cup (13) Syrian Basketball League (8) Syrian Basketball Cup (1) Syrian Basketball Super Cup
- Website: www.alwahdasport.sy
Home	Away

Al-Wahda active sections
Football	Basketball

Al-Wahda (Arabic: نادي الوحدة الرياضي) is a professional basketball club. It is a part of the Al-Wahda Sports Club, which is based in Damascus, Syria. The team changed its name in 1972 to the name they use today. It is known for being one of the pillars in the sport not only in the capital Damascus, but in all of Syria. Al-Wahda won the FIBA Asia Champions Cup in 2003.

== History ==
The team was founded in 1928 under the name Al-Qasioun Sports Club by Ahmed Ezzat Rifai, who was its original founder, being one of the oldest teams in the Arab world, who founded it as a sports team, encompassing basketball.

The club's golden age began in the 1990s, when the team was able to beat both the Aleppo clubs, Al Jalaa and Al Ittihad, and became the SBL champion in the 1994 season. Until the 2003 season, Al-Wahda SC absolutely dominated the domestic scene with 6 Syrian league titles. In the 1999-2004 seasons, they also won the Syrian Basketball Cup.

During its golden era, Al Wahda has established itself mainly at the international level. In the 1998 season, the club debuted in the first year of the West Asian Champions Cup, where it took 4th place. In the 2000 season, the club played for the second time in WABA League, which it managed to win, and advanced to the Asian Cup for the first time.

In the 2001 season, the team was able to defend their title in the WABA League and, after advancing to the Asian Cup in a tough competition after winning over Winling Hong Kong, placed third. In the 2002-03 season, Al-Wahda SC achieved the greatest success in the history of the club and Syrian basketball. At the FIBA Asian Cup in Kuala Lumpur, after winning the basic group, they advanced to the semifinals, where they defeated Sangmu FC 107:78 and in the final Al-Rayyan SC 96:63. In the following season, the club managed to advance to the Asian Cup after finishing second in the 2004 WABA League, where they won the group and advanced to the quarterfinals. After advancing to the finals, the club failed to defend the title, as it lost to Sagesse SC 70:72.

In 2014, after 11 years, the Wahda SC team won the SBL title after a 79:67 final win over Al-Ittihad. In 2015, Al Wahda defeated Al-Ittihad SC in the final and won its ninth title and the second in a row. In 2017, the club won the Syrian Cup and thus its last title.

The club's latest success is participating in the SBL final in the 2021 season, where it lost to Al Karamah SC 64:79 in the first match, won 74:69 in the second and lost 51:74 in the third. In the 2022 season, the team advanced to the Syrian Super Cup final, where it was beaten by Al-Ittihad 52:60.

== Home arena ==
- Al-Fayhaa Sports Arena: 1976–present
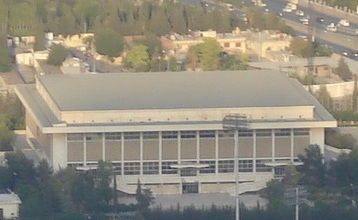
Al-Fayhaa Sports Arena

== Club rivalries ==
The biggest rival of the club is Al-Jaish SC, the biggest city derby in Damascus are playing against each other.

== Honours ==
=== Domestic ===
- Syrian Basketball League
  - Winners (13): 1993/1994 - 1996/1997 - 1997/1998 - 1998/1999 - 2000/2001 - 2001/2002 - 2002/2003 - 2013/2014 - 2014/2015 - 2022/2023 - 2023/2024 - 2024/2025 - 2025/2026
  - Runners-Up (1): 2020/2021
- Syrian Basketball Cup
  - Winners (8): 1996 - 2000 - 2001 - 2002 - 2003 - 2004 - 2017 - 2021
- Syrian Basketball Super Cup
  - Winners (2): 2022, 1994
  - Runners-Up (1): 2021
- Damascus Basketball Tournament
  - Third place (1): 2009

=== Asian ===
- FIBA Asia Champions Cup
  - Winners (1): 2003
  - Runners-Up (1): 2004
  - Third Place (2): 2001 - 2002
- WABA Champions Cup
  - Winners (2): 2000 - 2001
  - Runners-Up (1): 2004
- Dubai International Tournament
  - Third place (1): 2011

== Sponsorship ==
As of 2022, the main partners of the club are Cham Wings, Syria Gulf Bank, Lactomil (men team) and Dermexcel (women team).

== Current roster ==
Squad for the 2021–2022 Syrian Basketball League season:

Al Wahda roster
Players
Coaches

Pos.	No.	Nat.	Name
PF	0	(Syria)	Mohammed Otabashi
SG	3	(Syria)	Ajwad Elias
G	4	(Syria)	Ala'a Edelbi
SF	5	(Syria)	Yousef Manna'a
SG	7	(Syria)	Abdullah Al-Halabi
G	8	(Syria)	Magd Harbasha
C	10	(Syria)	Amer Al-Sati
SF	12	(Syria)	Omar Edelbi
G	13	(Syria)	Sharif Al-Osh
C	14	(Syria)	Manar Al-Hamad
C	23	(Syria)	Hani Adrebi
C	28	(Turkey)	Kemal Canpolat

Head coach

(Serbia) Nenad Krdzić

Assistant coach(es)

(Syria) Ahmad Halfawy

Legend

- (C) Team captain
- Injured

- Roster
Updated: 23 May 2022

Note: Flags indicate national team eligibility at FIBA-sanctioned events. Players may hold other non-FIBA nationalities not displayed.

== Past rosters ==
- 2010-2011:

Number	Player	Position	Height (cm)	Age
4	(Syria) Rabie Hashem	SF	188	22
5	(Syria) Omar Karkoukly	PG	175	29
6	(Syria) Souliman Dreeby	SF	198	25
7	(Syria) Hozifa Al Maleh	SG	185	24
8	(Syria) Majd Arbasheh	SG	178	20
9	(Syria) Muhammad Kahatt	SG	188	23
10	(Syria) Sharif Al Sharif (c)	SG	188	32
11	(United States) Adam Zahn	PF	203	27
12	(Syria) Yervent Jakerjian	C	202	31
13	(Syria) Sharif Al Esh	PG	187	21
14	(United States) Nicholas Zachery	SG	191	31
15	(Syria) Hani Dreeby	PF	198	20
TBD	(Syria) Yousef Mannaa	SF	189	19
TBD	(Syria) Muhammad Oudabashy	PF	195	18
TBD	(United States) Ricky Clemons	PG	180	30
TBD	(Syria) Tarek Ali Moussa	C	207	29

== Transfers ==
Transfers for the 2021-22 season:

Joining

- (Syria) Ala'a Edelbi from (Syria) Al-Jaish SC
- (Syria) Omar Edelbi from (Syria) Al-Thawra SC
- (Syria) Hani Adribe from (Syria) Al-Jaish SC
- (United States) Chris Crawford from (Guinea) SLAC
- (Tunisia) Mohamed Hdidane from (Tunisia) US Monastir
- (Tunisia) Omar Abada from (Saudi Arabia) Al-Ittihad Jeddah

Leaving

- (Palestine) Al Hakam Abdullah to (Syria) Al-Jaish SC
- (Syria) Tarek Aljabi to (Syria) Al-Karamah SC

== Notable players ==
Note: Flags indicate national team eligibility at FIBA-sanctioned events. Players may hold other non-FIBA nationalities not displayed.

Criteria

To appear in this section a player must have either:

- Set a club record or won an individual award while at the club
- Played at least one official international match for their national team at any time
- Played at least one official NBA match at any time.

== Head coaches ==
- (Syria) Hady Darwish (2006–2012)
- (Syria) Rateb Sheikh Najeeb
- (Belarus) Gennadi Samarskiy
- (Nigeria) Frederick Onika

== Club presidents ==
- List of Al Wahda presidents since 1974:

Period	President
1974–1976	Ahmed Al-Sharbaji
1976–1982	Hamad Al-Numan
1982–1986	Muntaz Malas
1986–1988	Ahmed Al-Sharbaji
1988–1990	Salim Daas
1990–1994	Salim Daas
1994–1996	Salim Daas
1996–1997	Ahmed Bitar
1997–1998	Ahmed Al Homsi
1998–2001	Muntaz Malas
2001–2003	Khaled Haboubati
2003–2004	Safwan Nizamuddin
2004–2006	Khaled Haboubati
2006–2008	Khaled Haboubati
2008–2009	Fouad Mahfoud
2009–2019	Ahmed Qutrash
2019–2021	Maher Al-Sayed
2021–2022	Anwar Abdel Hai
2022–present	Maher Al-Sayed

== Season by season ==
Season	Tier	League	Pos.	Syrian Cup	Syrian Super Cup	Asian competitions	Pos.
2013–14	1	SBL	1st	–	–	WABA Cup	QF
2014–15	1	SBL	1st	–	–	–	–
2015–16	1	SBL	3rd	–	–	–	–
2016–17	1	SBL		Champions	–	–	–
2017–18	1	SBL		–	–	–	–
2018–19	1	SBL	3rd	Semifinalist	–	–	–
2019–20	1	SBL	–	Semifinalist	No Championship		
2020–21	1	SBL	2nd	1st round	No Championship		
2021–22	1	SBL	3rd	Champions	2nd	–	–
