= Syrian Basketball Super Cup =

- Sport: Basketball
- Founded: 2021; 5 years ago
- CEO: Tarif Koutrach (SBF President)
- No. of teams: 8 (since 2022)
- Country: Syria; Lebanon
- Confederation: FIBA Asia
- Most recent champions: Al-Wahda (1st title)
- Most titles: Al-Ittihad & Al-Wahda (1 title each)
- Broadcasters: Sama TV; Syria TV
- Sponsors: Cham Wings Airlines, Syriatel, Sinalco, Lactomil
- Related competitions: Syrian Basketball League; Syrian Basketball Cup
- Website: www.syrbf.org

The Syrian Basketball Super Cup (Arabic: كأس السوبر السوري لكرة السلة) is the top-tier level national domestic basketball super cup competition, that is played between professional clubs in Syria. It was founded in 2021 as a new super cup composed of the best Syrian clubs. In 2022, two clubs from the Lebanese Basketball League joined the Super Cup.

== Format ==
According to the current format of the competition, the four best ranked teams from the previous season of the Syrian Basketball League, together with the winner of the Syrian Cup, will automatically qualify. In 2022, the Syrian Basketball Federation agreed with the Lebanese Basketball Federation that in the 2022-23 season, 2 clubs from the Lebanese Basketball League will also start in the competition.

In the first round, the teams play one match each, and the two best advance to the finals. The final is played in one match. The competition takes place every year in October.

== Winners ==
=== Titles by club ===
Club	Winners	Runners-up	Years won	Years Lost
Al-Ittihad	1	1	2021	2022
Al-Wahda	1	1	2022	2021

=== Titles by city ===
Two clubs have won the Syrian Basketball Super Cup.

City	Winners	Club(s)
Aleppo	1	Al-Ittihad SC
Damascus	1	Al-Wahda SC

== Super Cup 2021 ==
=== First round ===
Pos	Team	Pld	W	L	PF	PA	PD	Pts	Qualification
1	Al-Wahda SC	5	4	1	373	303	+70	9	Advance to the Finals
2	Al-Ittihad SC	5	3	2	365	286	+79	8	Advance to the Finals
3	Al-Karamah SC	5	3	2	380	332	+48	8	
4	Al-Jaish SC	5	3	2	366	322	+44	8	
5	Jalaa SC	5	2	3	359	327	+32	7	
6	Huteen SC	5	0	5	204	477	−273	5	

Updated to match(es) played on 21 October 2021. Source: goalzz.com

=== Finals ===
Champions	Score	Runners-up	Location
Al-Ittihad SC	60:52	Al-Wahda SC	Al Fayhaa Arena

== Super Cup 2022 ==
=== First round ===
Pos	Team	Pld	W	L	PF	PA	PD	Pts	Qualification
1	Al-Jaish SC	3	3	0	269	230	+39	6	Advance to Quarterfinals
2	Al-Wahda SC	3	3	0	280	240	+40	6	Advance to Quarterfinals
3	Al-Ittihad SC	3	2	1	235	216	+19	5	Advance to Quarterfinals
4	Al-Karamah SC	3	2	1	238	231	+7	5	Advance to Quarterfinals
5	Jalaa SC	3	1	2	206	228	−22	4	Advance to Quarterfinals
6	Homenetmen Beirut	3	1	2	259	274	−15	4	Advance to Quarterfinals
7	Louaize Club	3	0	3	240	274	−34	3	Advance to Quarterfinals
8	Al-Nawair SC	3	0	3	199	238	−39	3	Advance to Quarterfinals

Updated to match(es) played on 31 October 2022. Source: goalzz.com

=== Play-offs ===
Quarterfinals
2	Al-Wahda	84
7	Louaize Club	79
4	Al-Karamah	75
6	Homenetmen	72
1	Al-Jaish	91
8	Al-Nawair SC	78
3	Al-Ittihad	75
5	Jalaa	56

Semifinals
2	Al-Wahda	78
4	Al-Karamah	64
1	Al-Jaish	57
3	Al-Ittihad	69

Finals
2	Al-Wahda	54
3	Al-Ittihad	46

=== Finals ===
The match had to be abandoned earlier because Al-Wahda fans injured Abdulwahab Al-Hamwi. The judges awarded the victory to Al-Wahda.

Champions	Score	Runners-up	Location
Al-Wahda SC	54:46	Al-Ittihad SC	Al Fayhaa Arena

== Sponsorship ==
The main sponsors of the tournament are Syria Gulf Bank, Fatora, Lactomil, Sinalco, Syriatel, Cham Wings, Sama TV and Syria TV.

== See also ==
- Syrian Basketball Federation
- Syrian Basketball League
