= Damond Williams =

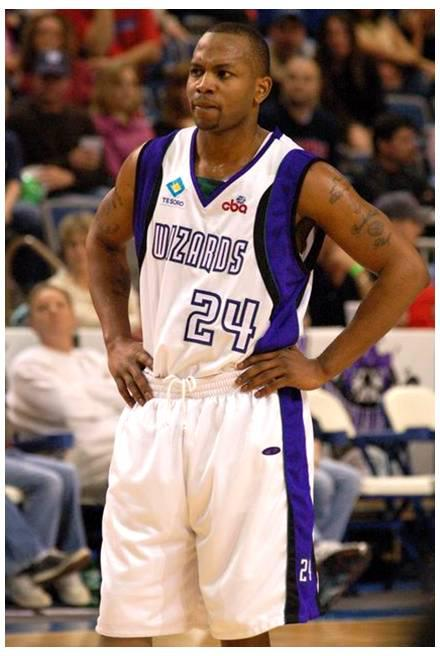
- Williams with the Dakota Wizards

Personal information
- Born: October 10, 1980 (age 45) Chicago, Illinois, U.S.
- Listed height: 6 ft 6 in (1.98 m)
- Listed weight: 205 lb (93 kg)

Career information
- High school: Hyde Park (Chicago, Illinois)
- College: New Mexico State (1998–1999); McNeese State (2001–2003)
- NBA draft: 2003: undrafted
- Playing career: 2003–2013
- Position: Shooting guard / point guard

Career history
- 2003–2004: Tralee Tigers
- 2004: Cedar Rapids River Raiders
- 2004: Harlem Globetrotters
- 2005: Soles de Mexicali
- 2005–2006: Dakota Wizards
- 2006–2007: Boca Juniors
- 2007: Calor de Mexicali
- 2007: Los Angeles D-Fenders
- 2007–2008: Al-Jaish SC
- 2008: Reales de La Vega
- 2008–2009: Jalaa SC
- 2009–2010: Al-Ittihad SC Aleppo
- 2010: Titanes Del Distrito Nacional
- 2011: Mineros de Cananea
- 2011: Huracanes del Atlantico
- 2012: Hoops Club
- 2013: Mineros de Cananea

Career highlights
- Syrian League champion (2009); Syrian League MVP (2008); Copa Argentina de Básquetbol champion (2007); CIBACOPA All-Star (2007); Irish Superleague champion (2004)

Damond L. Williams (born October 10, 1980) is an American former professional basketball player, author, and sports executive. Standing 6 ft 6 in (1.98 m), he played primarily as a combo guard, alternating between the point guard and shooting guard positions. Williams played collegiate basketball in the United States before beginning an international professional career that included competition in the Middle East and Asia. During the 2009 season, he led his team to a 42–0 record in the Syrian Premier League and Syrian League Cup. That same year, he was named Best Shooting Guard at the 20th Dubai International Basketball Tournament. Following his playing career, Williams transitioned into sports business and education. He is the founder of the Chicago Basketball Academy, an organization focused on athlete development and sports business education. Williams is the author of The Basketball Economy (2026), a book examining the global business infrastructure of basketball, including revenue systems, international market expansion, athlete monetization models, and the role of technology and investment in the sport.

== Early life and youth ==
Damond L. Williams was born and raised on the southeast side of Chicago, Illinois. He attended Hyde Park Career Academy, where he was an honor roll student-athlete. In addition to basketball, Williams earned All-City recognition in cross country during his high school career. Williams gained attention for his athleticism and scoring ability in basketball, including participation in local slam dunk contests. At age 17, he received a full athletic scholarship to New Mexico State University in 1997.

== College career ==
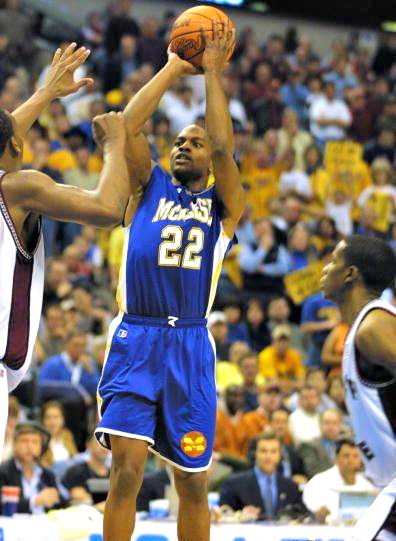
Williams shooting a contested jumper while playing for McNeese State

Williams played NCAA Division I basketball on full athletic scholarship at New Mexico State University and the University of Memphis before transferring to McNeese State University. At McNeese State, he became a key contributor for the Cowboys men's basketball team. During his tenure in Lake Charles, Louisiana, Williams was named the 2003 McNeese State University MVP (Lake Charles Toyota Award). Over 50 games with the Cowboys, he established himself as a consistent contributor on both ends of the court while completing a bachelor's degree in Social Sciences. Williams was part of the McNeese State team that won the Southland Conference championship and advanced to the 2002 NCAA Division I men's basketball tournament. In the first-round matchup against Mississippi State University, he was named Chevrolet MVP of the game.

== Professional career ==
=== Ireland ===
Williams began his professional career during the 2003–04 season with the Tralee Tigers of the Irish Premier League. He departed the club midway through the season.

=== United States ===
During the 2004–05 season, Williams played in the United States Basketball League (USBL) with the Cedar Rapids River Raiders. He later competed in the Continental Basketball Association (CBA) with the Dakota Wizards during the 2005–06 season. Williams was subsequently drafted to play professionally in Argentina. Upon returning to the United States, he was selected in the NBA Development League draft by the Los Angeles D-Fenders. However, he elected to pursue an international opportunity in Syria instead. He also appeared in exhibition games with the Harlem Globetrotters in 2004 and 2007.

=== Latin America ===
In 2007, Williams joined Boca Juniors (basketball) of Argentina’s Liga Nacional de Básquetbol. During his tenure, Boca Juniors won the Copa Argentina de Básquetbol and the Campeonato Sudamericano de Clubes. Williams later played for additional teams in Latin America, including Reales de La Vega, Titanes del Distrito Nacional, Mineros de Cananea, and Huracanes del Atlántico.

=== West Asia ===
From 2007 to 2010, Williams played in the Syrian Basketball League for Al-Jaish SC (Damascus), Al-Ittihad SC Aleppo, and Jalaa SC (men's basketball). During his time in Syria, he competed in domestic league and cup competitions, as well as regional tournaments including the Dubai International Basketball Tournament.

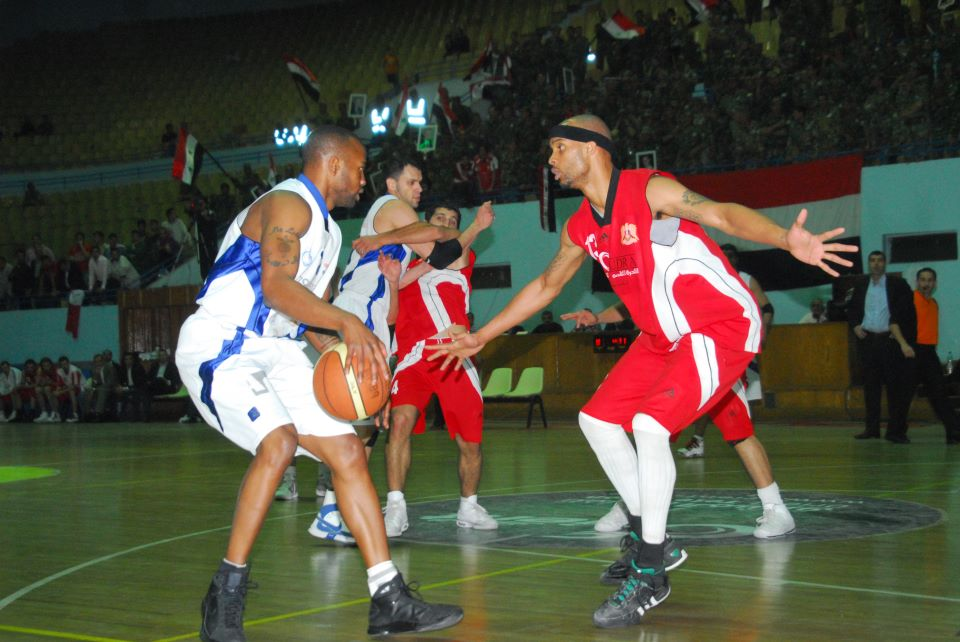
The Syrian Basketball League.

== Professional career statistics ==
Legend
| GP | Games played | GS | Games started | MPG | Minutes per game |
| FG% | Field goal percentage | 3P% | 3-point field goal percentage | FT% | Free throw percentage |
| RPG | Rebounds per game | APG | Assists per game | SPG | Steals per game |
| BPG | Blocks per game | PPG | Points per game | **Bold** | Career high |

=== Professional career ===
| Year | Team | GP | GS | MPG | FG% | 3P% | FT% | RPG | APG | SPG | BPG | PPG |
|---|---|---|---|---|---|---|---|---|---|---|---|---|
| 2003–04 | Tralee Tigers | 11 | 11 | 38 | 53.4 | 38.7 | 78.9 | **9.2** | 2.5 | 1.2 | .7 | 19.5 |
| 2004–04 | Cedar Rapids River Raiders | 5 | 1 | 9 | 52.5 | 39.4 | **81.8** | 1.4 | 1.6 | 1.1 | 1.2 | 4.0 |
| 2005–05 | Soles de Mexicali | 7 | 7 | 37 | 56.8 | 39.7 | 77.3 | 7.0 | 5.4 | 1.3 | **1.7** | 28.4 |
| 2005–06 | Dakota Wizards | **34** | 5 | 24 | 54.9 | 18.8 | 60.9 | 3.5 | 1.1 | 1.1 | .8 | 8.3 |
| 2006–07 | Boca Juniors (basketball) | 10 | 10 | 35 | 55.5 | 38.8 | 74.7 | 6.7 | 3.9 | 1.2 | 1.5 | 18.9 |
| 2007–07 | Calor de Mexicali | 12 | 12 | 37 | 53.6 | 41.2 | 77.3 | 7.9 | 3.2 | 2.3 | 1.4 | **32.1** |
| 2007–08 | Al-Jaish SC (Damascus) | 27 | 27 | 36 | 59.0 | 40.7 | 79.6 | 7.3 | 3.4 | 1.8 | .9 | 28.6 |
| 2008–08 | Reales de La Vega | 8 | 8 | 35 | 56.2 | 41.4 | 79.7 | 6.7 | 2.7 | 1.4 | 1.3 | 24.7 |
| 2008–09 | Jalaa SC (men's basketball) | 32 | **32** | 27 | 58.3 | **42.5** | 76.2 | 5.8 | 4.9 | 1.9 | 1.1 | 17.6 |
| 2009–10 | Al-Ittihad SC Aleppo | 27 | 27 | **38** | 58.9 | 42.5 | 78.6 | 7.4 | **5.7** | 1.7 | 1.6 | 27.4 |
| 2010–10 | Titanes Del Distrito Nacional | 8 | 8 | 35 | 53.8 | 41.8 | 77.3 | 6.5 | 3.8 | 1.3 | .8 | 24.8 |
| 2011–11 | Mineros de Cananea | 8 | 8 | 31 | 57.5 | 30.0 | 74.2 | 4.1 | 1.8 | 1.4 | 1.0 | 15.6 |
| 2012–12 | Hoops Club | 12 | 12 | 38 | 57.9 | 21.8 | 59.9 | 7.6 | 5.6 | 2.3 | 1.6 | 21.4 |
| 2013–13 | Mineros de Cananea | 10 | 10 | 29 | **64.4** | 20.0 | 81.0 | 2.8 | 4.8 | **2.6** | 0.8 | 16.3 |
| Career | | 189 | 185 | – | – | – | – | – | – | – | – | – |

=== College career ===
| Year | Team | GP | GS | MPG | FG% | 3P% | FT% | RPG | APG | SPG | BPG | PPG |
|---|---|---|---|---|---|---|---|---|---|---|---|---|
| 2001–02 | McNeese State University | 21 | 21 | 34 | **51.2** | **38.1** | **61.8** | 5.5 | 1.4 | **1.8** | .7 | **11.4** |
| 2002–03 | McNeese State University | **29** | **27** | **35** | 46.7 | 29.9 | 54.2 | **6.3** | **2.4** | 1.7 | **1.3** | 10.7 |
| Career | | 50 | 48 | – | – | – | – | – | – | – | – | – |

== Awards and accomplishments ==
=== Pro career ===
- 2007 Liga Profesional de Baloncesto Regular Season Finalist – Silver
- 2007 Circuito de Baloncesto de la Costa del Pacífico All Star Game
- 2007 Copa Argentina de Básquetbol Champion: Gold
- 2007 Campeonato Sudamericano de Clubes Finalist: Silver
- 2008 Syrian Premier League MVP
- 2008 Jalaa SC (men's basketball) Silver
- 2009 Jalaa SC (men's basketball) Champion Gold
- 2009 Jalaa SC (men's basketball) Syrian Premier League Champion Gold
- 2009 Jalaa SC (men's basketball) Syrian Cup Winner Champion Gold
- 2009 Jalaa SC (men's basketball) Aleppo International Tournament Champion Gold
- 2009 Dubai International Tournament Bronze
- 2009 Best Shooting Guard Dubai International Tournament
- 2010 Syrian Basketball Cup Bronze
- 2010 Asia-Basket.com All-Syrian League Honorable Mention
- 2012 All-Lebanon League Honorable Mention

=== College career ===
- 2002 Chevrolet McNeese State University MVP
- 2002 Southland Conference tournament Winner Gold
- 2002 Southland Conference Regular Season champion Gold
- 2002 All-Southland Conference
- 2003 Toyota Lake Charles McNeese State University MVP
