= Kemal Canbolat =

Turkish basketball player (born 1994)

No. 28 – Al Wahda Damascus
- Position: Center
- League: Syrian Basketball League

Personal information
- Born: April 12, 1994 (age 32) Hassa, Turkey
- Listed height: 6 ft 11 in (2.11 m)

Career information
- NBA draft: 2015: Undrafted
- Playing career: 2011–present

Career history
- 2011–2013: Sigortam Net ITÜ
- 2013–2015: Denizli Pamukkale
- 2015–2016: Aydın Efe Spor
- 2016–2017: Zirve Üniversitesi
- 2017–2018: Antalyaspor
- 2018–2019: OGM Ormanspor
- 2019–2020: BC Šilutė
- 2019–2020: BC Alytus
- 2020–2021: Sigortam Net ITÜ
- 2021: Konyaspor
- 2021–2022: Çağdaş Bodrumspor
- 2022–present: Al Wahda Damascus

Kemal Canbolat (born April 12, 1994) is a Syrian international basketball player. He currently plays for Al Wahda Damascus of the Syrian Basketball League.

He has been a member of Syria national basketball team since 2020.
