= Al-Karamah SC (men's basketball) =

Syrian basketball club

- Nickname: Blue Eagles; Eagles of Asia
- League: Syrian Basketball League
- Founded: 1928
- History: Khalid bin Walid SC; 1928–1957; Al-Wahda SC; 1957–1971; Al-Karamah SC; 1971–present
- Arena: Al-Karamah Arena
- Location: Homs, Syria
- Team colors: Blue and White
- President: Samer al-Shaar
- Head coach: (Syria) Khaled Abo Tok
- 2021–22 position: Syrian League, 2nd of 12
- Championships: (1) Syrian Basketball League
- Website: Official page
Home	Away

Al-Karamah active sections
Football	Basketball

Al-Karamah SC (Arabic: نادي الكرامة الرياضي) is a Syrian professional basketball club based in the city of Homs, that plays in the Syrian Basketball League. The team is part of the multi-sports club of the same name. In 2021, the Al-Karamah club won its first SBL title.

== History ==
The club was founded in 1928 as Khalid Bin Walid Sports Club. Since 1971, the club has been called by its current name. In the 2014 season, after the first place in the regular season (Gr.A), the club under the leadership of coach Azzam Husain reached the SBL semifinals, where he lost to Al-Ittihad SC 74-93 and took the final 3rd place.

The first big success in the history of the club was participation in the final of the SBL in 2016 season, where they were defeated by Al-Jaish SC. In the 2021 season, led by coach Khaled Abu Toq, the team placed first in the regular season. In the semifinals, the team encountered Al-Ittihad SC, over which it won 2–1 in matches. In the SBL final, they met the Al-Wahda SC, which they beat 79–64 in the first match. In the third decisive match, they won mainly thanks to Omar Sheikh Ali, who became the MVP of the match, 74–51 over Wahda SC and won their first SBL title.

In the 2022 season, they finished third in the new Syrian Super Cup.

== Club rivalries ==
The biggest rival and competitor of the club is Al-Wathba SC, with which they play the Homs city derby.

== Honours ==
- Syrian Basketball League
  - Winners (1): 2021
  - Runners-up (2): 2016 - 2022
  - Third place (1): 2014
- Syrian Basketball Cup
  - Third place (1): 2022
- Syrian Basketball Super Cup
  - Third place (2): 2021 - 2022

== Current roster ==
Squad for the 2021/2022 Syrian Basketball League season:

Al-Karamah roster
Players
Coaches

Pos.	No.	Nat.	Name
PF/C	0	(Syria)	Majid Bou-Aita
PG	4	(Syria)	Anas Shaban
C	6	(Syria)	Muhanna Hatwik
PG	9	(Syria)	Tarek Al-Jabi
PG	7	(Syria)	Abdulrahman al-Kurdi
F	10	(Syria)	Mohammad Hadri
SF	13	(Syria)	Joseph Youssef
F	14	(Syria)	Eyad Hilani
F	21	(Syria)	Omar Cheikh-Ali
C	22	(Algeria)	Touhami Ghezzoul
PG	66	(Syria)	George Nazarian

Head coach

(Syria) Haitham Jamil

Assistant coach(es)

(Syria) Nidal Al-Aswad

Legend

- (C) Team captain
- Injured

- Roster

Note: Flags indicate national team eligibility at FIBA-sanctioned events. Players may hold other non-FIBA nationalities not displayed.
