= Michael Madanly =

Syrian basketball player (born 1981)

Micheal Madanly
Personal information
- Born: 10 March 1981 (age 45) Aleppo, Syria
- Listed height: 6 ft 5 in (1.96 m)
- Listed weight: 198 lb (90 kg)

Career information
- Playing career: 2004–2022
- Position: Shooting guard / small forward

Career history
- 2004–2011: Al-Jalaa
- 2011: Al-Jaish
- 2011–2013: Foshan Dralions
- 2013: Qingdao Doublestar Eagles
- 2014–2015: Jilin Northeast Tigers
- 2015: NLEX Road Warriors
- 2015–2016: Champville
- 2016: TNT KaTropa
- 2016–2017: Landslake Lions
- 2017: Apollo Amsterdam
- 2017–2018: Rotterdam
- 2022: Al-Ittihad

Career highlights
- Dutch Second League Champion (2017); 5x Syrian League Champion (2007-2009, 2011, 2022); 4x Syrian Cup Champion (2005-2007, 2009); 2x Syrian League Player of the Year (2009, 2011)

Micheal Madanly (born 10 March 1981 in Aleppo), better known as Michel Madanly or just Micho, is a Syrian former professional basketball player. Most known in his prime playing for Jalaa SC's basketball programme from 2004 to 2011, he also played in a number of Syrian and international basketball clubs in China, Philippines, Lebanon and the Netherlands and a regular feature for many years in the Syrian national basketball team. Madanly is perhaps best known as the leading scorer in the 2007 FIBA Asia Championship, averaging 33.1 points per game.

== Professional career ==
=== Syria ===
He first started his career in Al-Jalaa basketball team in his native city of Aleppo. Madanly had originally planned to enter the club as a football player but the club's football team, Jalaa SC, was inactive during that period. Consequently, he joined the basketball section of the club.

He played for a three years with Al-Jeish (Army) Club in Syria as part of a mandatory military service but was transferred to Al-Jalaa once again, where he achieved a lot.

=== China ===
In late 2011, he signed a 4-month contract with the Foshan Dralions in the Chinese Basketball Association (CBA) because of the Syrian Civil War that was preventing the Syrian Basketball League to start.

In 2013, Madanly signed with the Qingdong DoubleStar Eagles but only played 3 games for them.

In 2014, Madanly signed with the Jilin Northeast Tigers, playing in 37 games for them while averaging 21.2 points per game and 6.5 rebounds per game in 42.5 minutes per game.

=== Philippines ===
In late April 2015, the NLEX Road Warriors signed him for the 2015 PBA Governors' Cup as the team's Asian import.

In June 2016, Madanly returned to the Philippines, this time suiting up for another team, the Tropang TNT, the sister team of his former PBA team, NLEX, as TNT's Asian import for the 2016 PBA Governors' Cup.

=== Netherlands ===
In the 2016–17 season, Madanly played in the Promotiedivisie with Landslake Lions. He won the league title with the team after winning the Final Four.

For the 2017–18 season, he played with Apollo Amsterdam in the first tier Dutch Basketball League (DBL). On 8 October 2017, Madanly scored 21 points in his debut for Apollo, in an 80–82 win over Rotterdam. On 21 December 2017, he signed with Forward Lease Rotterdam for the remainder of the season. With Rotterdam, he reached the semi-finals of the playoffs where his team lost to Donar Groningen, 0–4.

=== Syria ===
In January 2022, Madanly's transfer to Al-Ittihad Aleppo was announced.

== International career ==
Madanly has played for the national basketball team of Syria.

== Personal life ==
Michel Madanly and his family are Syrian Christians from Aleppo. After the break-up of the Syrian Civil War in 2011, Michel's brother Habib Madanly who was a factory manager with no ties to the Syrian government or military, was taken hostage by the Islamist militants. Mandaly's family paid Habib's ransom. After being freed, Habib moved to California, while Michel and his parents moved to Amsterdam in the Netherlands, and continued his career as a professional basketball player.

Madanly is married to Diane Theodori since 2012.

Due to a mistake by the birth registering office, Madanly is named "Micheal" instead of "Michael".
