= Al-Oruba =

Al-Oruba Means unity or belonging:

== Sports ==
=== Football ===
- Al-Oruba FC, Saudi Arabian football club
- Al-Oruba (Zabid), Yemen football club
- Al-Orouba SC, Oman football club
- Al-Oruba SC, defunct Qatari football club
- Al-Oruba SC (Iraq), Iraqi football club
- Ouroube SC, Syrian football club
- Al Urouba (Ajelat), Libyan football club
- Al Urooba, Emirati football club
