= Al-Ittihad SC Aleppo (women's basketball) =

Al-Ittihad Ahli of Aleppo Sports Club
- Nickname: The Red Castle; Halab Al-Ahli
- Leagues: Syrian Women Basketball League
- Founded: 1951
- History: Al-Ahli Aleppo; 1951–1972; Al-Ittihad Aleppo; 1972–2022; Al-Ittihad Ahli Aleppo; 2022–
- Arena: Al-Hamadaniah Sports Arena (capacity: 7,964)
- Location: Aleppo, Syria
- Team colors: Red and White
- President: Rasen Martini
- 2021–22 position: Syrian League, 7th of 10
Home	Away

Al-Ittihad Ahli of Aleppo SC active sections
Football	Basketball	Women’s Basketball

Al-Ittihad Ahli of Aleppo (Arabic: الاتحاد بحلب) is a major women's professional basketball club. It is a part of the Al-Ittihad Sports Club, which is based in Aleppo, Syria.

== Honours ==
- Syrian Women Basketball League 2
  - Winners (1): 2019

== League positions ==
- Syrian Women Basketball League
  - Fourth place (1): 2021
  - Seventh place (2): 2009 - 2019 - 2022

== See also ==
- Al-Ittihad SC Aleppo
- Al-Ittihad SC Aleppo (men's basketball)
