= 2006 WABA Super League =

West Asian basketball tournament

The West Asian Basketball Super League 2006 (WASL) was the 1st staging of the WASL League, the basketball club league of West Asia Basketball Association. The top four teams from different countries qualify for the FIBA Asia Champions Cup 2006.

== Preliminary round ==
=== Group A ===
Team	Pld	W	L	PF	PA	PD	Pts
(Lebanon) Sagesse	3	3	0	244	215	+29	6
(Jordan) Aramex	3	2	1	240	238	+2	5
(Iran) Sanam Tehran	3	1	2	230	236	−6	4
(Syria) Al-Jaish	3	0	3	227	252	−25	3

February 22

Sanam Tehran (Iran)	82–83	(Jordan) Aramex

Azadi Basketball Hall, Tehran

February 23

Al-Jaish (Syria)	80–83 (OT)	(Iran) Sanam Tehran

Azadi Basketball Hall, Tehran

February 24

Sagesse (Lebanon)	85–74	(Jordan) Aramex

Azadi Basketball Hall, Tehran

February 25

Al-Jaish (Syria)	76–86	(Lebanon) Sagesse

Azadi Basketball Hall, Tehran

February 26

Aramex (Jordan)	83–71	(Syria) Al-Jaish

Azadi Basketball Hall, Tehran

February 26

Sagesse (Lebanon)	73–65	(Iran) Sanam Tehran

Azadi Basketball Hall, Tehran

=== Group B ===
Team	Pld	W	L	PF	PA	PD	Pts
(Iran) Saba Battery Tehran	4	4	0	326	246	+80	8
(Syria) Al-Jalaa Aleppo	4	3	1	288	274	+14	7
(Lebanon) Blue Stars	4	2	2	340	296	+44	6
(Jordan) Fastlink	4	1	3	259	281	−22	5
(Iraq) Al-Karkh	4	0	4	237	253	−116	4

February 15

Al-Karkh (Iraq)	64–79	(Iran) Saba Battery Tehran

Al-Jalaa Basketball Court, Aleppo

February 15

Al-Jalaa (Syria)	95–91	(Lebanon) Blue Stars

Al-Jalaa Basketball Court, Aleppo

February 16

Blue Stars (Lebanon)	71–57	(Jordan) Fastlink

Al-Jalaa Basketball Court, Aleppo

February 16

Saba Battery Tehran (Iran)	78–53	(Syria) Al-Jalaa

Al-Jalaa Basketball Court, Aleppo

February 17

Fastlink (Jordan)	63–88	(Iran) Saba Battery Tehran

Al-Jalaa Basketball Court, Aleppo

February 17

Al-Jalaa (Syria)	79–49	(Iraq) Al-Karkh

Al-Jalaa Basketball Court, Aleppo

February 18

Saba Battery Tehran (Iran)	81–66	(Lebanon) Blue Stars

Al-Jalaa Basketball Court, Aleppo

February 18

Al-Karkh (Iraq)	61–83	(Jordan) Fastlink

Al-Jalaa Basketball Court, Aleppo

February 19

Blue Stars (Lebanon)	112–63	(Iraq) Al-Karkh

Al-Jalaa Basketball Court, Aleppo

February 19

Fastlink (Jordan)	56–61	(Syria) Al-Jalaa

Al-Jalaa Basketball Court, Aleppo

== Knockout round ==
Quarterfinals
B1	(Iran) Saba Battery	91	80	171
A4	(Syria) Al-Jaish	90	77	167
A2	(Jordan) Aramex	85	81	166
B3	(Lebanon) Blue Stars	90	83	173
A1	(Lebanon) Sagesse	83	89	172
B4	(Jordan) Fastlink	71	86	157
B2	(Syria) Al-Jalaa	79	86	165
A3	(Iran) Sanam	80	75	155

Semifinals
B1	(Iran) Saba Battery	89	74	87
B3	(Lebanon) Blue Stars	81	77	86
A1	(Lebanon) Sagesse	82	72	20
B2	(Syria) Al-Jalaa	88	68	0

Final
B1	(Iran) Saba Battery	80	67	81	20	x
A1	(Lebanon) Sagesse	78	99	84	0	x
3rd place
B3	(Lebanon) Blue Stars	87	75	—
B2	(Syria) Al-Jalaa	90	'81	—

=== Quarterfinals ===
Game 1

March 13

Saba Battery Tehran (Iran)	91–90	(Syria) Al-Jaish

Azadi Basketball Hall, Tehran

March 27

Al-Jaish (Syria)	77–80	(Iran) Saba Battery Tehran

Al-Fayhaa Indoor Stadium, Damascus

Total

Saba Battery Tehran (Iran)	171–167	(Syria) Al-Jaish

Game 2

March 20

Aramex (Jordan)	85–90	(Lebanon) Blue Stars

Prince Hamzah Court, Amman

April 4

Blue Stars (Lebanon)	83–81	(Jordan) Aramex

Michel Murr Court, Beirut

Total

Aramex (Jordan)	166–173	(Lebanon) Blue Stars

Game 3

March 21

Sagesse (Lebanon)	83–71	(Jordan) Fastlink

Michel Murr Court, Beirut

April 3

Fastlink (Jordan)	86–89	(Lebanon) Sagesse

Prince Hamzah Court, Amman

Total

Sagesse (Lebanon)	172–157	(Jordan) Fastlink

Game 4

March 14

Sanam Tehran (Iran)	80–79	(Syria) Al-Jalaa

Azadi Basketball Hall, Tehran

March 28

Al-Jalaa (Syria)	86–75	(Iran) Sanam Tehran

Al-Jalaa Basketball Court, Aleppo

Total

Al-Jalaa (Syria)	165–155	(Iran) Sanam Tehran

=== Semifinals ===
Game 1

April 17

Saba Battery Tehran (Iran)	89–81	(Lebanon) Blue Stars

Azadi Basketball Hall, Tehran

April 24

Blue Stars (Lebanon)	77–74	(Iran) Saba Battery Tehran

Michel Murr Court, Beirut

May 1

Saba Battery Tehran (Iran)	87–86	(Lebanon) Blue Stars

Azadi Basketball Hall, Tehran

Total

Saba Battery Tehran (Iran)	2–1	(Lebanon) Blue Stars

Game 2

April 18

Sagesse (Lebanon)	82–88	(Syria) Al-Jalaa

Michel Murr Court, Beirut

April 25

Al-Jalaa (Syria)	68–72	(Lebanon) Sagesse

Al-Jalaa Basketball Court, Aleppo

May 2

Sagesse (Lebanon)	20–0	(Syria) Al-Jalaa

Michel Murr Court, Beirut

Total

Sagesse (Lebanon)	2–1	(Syria) Al-Jalaa

=== 3rd place ===
May 16

Al-Jalaa (Syria)	90–87	(Lebanon) Blue Stars

Al-Jalaa Basketball Court, Aleppo

May 23

Blue Stars (Lebanon)	75–81	(Syria) Al-Jalaa

Michel Murr Court, Beirut

Total

Al-Jalaa (Syria)	2–0	(Lebanon) Blue Stars

=== Final ===
May 17
17:30

Saba Battery Tehran (Iran)	80–78	(Lebanon) Sagesse
Scoring by quarter: 25−25, 19−21, 12−13, 24−19

Azadi Basketball Hall, Tehran

May 22
17:00

Sagesse (Lebanon)	99–67	(Iran) Saba Battery Tehran
Scoring by quarter: 22−15, 30−20, 25−18, 22−14

Michel Murr Court, Beirut

May 24
17:00

Sagesse (Lebanon)	84–81	(Iran) Saba Battery Tehran
Scoring by quarter: 26−17, 25−21, 11−28, 22−15

Michel Murr Court, Beirut

May 27
17:30

Saba Battery Tehran (Iran)	20–0	(Lebanon) Sagesse
Scoring by quarter: 25−15; Sagesse walked out

Azadi Basketball Hall, Tehran

May 28
17:30

Saba Battery Tehran (Iran)	vs.	(Lebanon) Sagesse
Cancelled

Azadi Basketball Hall, Tehran

Total

Saba Battery Tehran (Iran)	2–2	(Lebanon) Sagesse
Both teams awarded the second place
