= WABA Champions Cup =

West Asian club championship for basketball

West Asian Basketball League
- Current season, competition or edition: 2019 WABA Champions Cup
- Sport: Basketball
- Founded: 1998–2019
- No. of teams: Various
- Continent: FIBA Asia (Asia)
- Most recent champion: (Iran) Chemidor (2019)

The WABA Champions Cup, between 2011 and 2012 known as the West Asian Basketball League (WABL), was the West Asian club championship for basketball organized by West Asia Basketball Association, and took place every year, It also served as a qualifying tournament for the FIBA Asia Champions Cup.

== Champions ==
Year	Venue	Champion	Result	Runner-up	Third place
1998	Amman, Jordan	(Lebanon) Al-Riyadi	No playoffs	(Jordan) Al-Jazeera	(Iran) Zob Ahan
1999	Amman, Jordan	(Jordan) Orthodox	No playoffs	(Iraq) Al-Quwa Al-Jawiya	(Palestine) Al-Quds
2000	Damascus, Syria	(Syria) Al-Wahda	No playoffs	(Iran) Zob Ahan	(Iraq) Al-Quwa Al-Jawiya
2001	Damascus, Syria	(Syria) Al-Wahda	No playoffs	(Jordan) Orthodox	(Syria) Al-Ittihad
2002	Beirut, Lebanon	(Lebanon) Sagesse	No playoffs	(Jordan) Orthodox	(Iraq) Al-Karkh
2003	Tehran, Iran	(Iran) Sanam	No playoffs	(Jordan) Arena	(Iran) Zob Ahan
2004	Damascus, Syria	(Lebanon) Sagesse	No playoffs	(Syria) Al-Wahda	(Iran) Sanam
2005	Amman, Jordan	(Lebanon) Sagesse	No playoffs	(Iran) Saba Battery	(Jordan) Fastlink
2006	No fixed venue	No champion	Aborted	(Iran) Saba Battery (Lebanon) Sagesse	(Syria) Al-Jalaa
2007	Aleppo, Syria	(Iran) Saba Battery	82–79	(Syria) Al-Jalaa	(Lebanon) Blue Stars
2008	Mahshahr, Iran	(Lebanon) Al-Riyadi	83–82 (OT)	(Iran) Saba Battery	(Iran) Petrochimi
2009	Amman, Jordan	(Iran) Mahram	96–85	(Jordan) Zain	(Iran) Saba Mehr
2010	Tehran, Iran	(Iran) Mahram	No playoffs	(Syria) Al-Jalaa	(Iran) Zob Ahan
2011	No fixed venue	(Lebanon) Al-Riyadi	3–2	(Syria) Al-Jalaa	(Iran) Mahram
2012	No fixed venue	(Iran) Mahram	3–2	(Lebanon) Al-Riyadi	
2013	Duhok, Iraq	(Lebanon) Champville	No playoffs	(Iran) Foolad Mahan	(Iran) Petrochimi
2014	Tehran, Iran	(Iran) Mahram	90–73	(Iran) Petrochimi	(Jordan) ASU
2016	Amman, Jordan	(Iran) Petrochimi	70–68	(Lebanon) Al-Riyadi	(Iran) Azad University
2017	Amman, Jordan	(Lebanon) Al-Riyadi	83–69	(Iran) Petrochimi	(Iran) Naft Abadan
2018	Beirut, Lebanon	(Iran) Petrochimi	No playoffs	(Lebanon) Al-Riyadi	(Palestine) Sareyyet Ramallah
2019	Baghdad, Iraq	(Iran) Chemidor	No playoffs	(Iran) Petrochimi	(Iraq) Al-Naft

== Titles by team ==
Team	Champion	Runner-up	Third
(Lebanon) Al-Riyadi Beirut	4 (1998, 2008, 2011, 2017)	3 (2012, 2016, 2018)	
(Iran) Mahram Tehran	4 (2009, 2010, 2012, 2014)		1 (2011)
(Lebanon) Sagesse	3 (2002, 2004, 2005)	1 (2006)	
(Iran) Petrochimi Bandar Imam	2 (2016, 2018)	3 (2014, 2017, 2019)	2 (2008, 2013)
(Syria) Al-Wahda	2 (2000, 2001)	1 (2004)	
(Iran) Saba Battery Tehran	1 (2007)	3 (2005, 2006, 2008)	1 (2009)
(Jordan) Orthodox	1 (1999)	2 (2001, 2002)	
(Iran) Sanam Tehran	1 (2003)		1 (2004)
(Lebanon) Champville	1 (2013)		
(Iran) Chemidor Tehran	1 (2019)		
(Syria) Al-Jalaa		3 (2007, 2010, 2011)	1 (2006)
(Iran) Zob Ahan Isfahan		1 (2000)	3 (1998, 2003, 2010)
(Iraq) Al-Quwa Al-Jawiya		1 (1999)	1 (2000)
(Jordan) Zain		1 (2009)	1 (2005)
(Jordan) Al-Jazeera		1 (1998)	
(Jordan) Arena		1 (2003)	
(Iran) Foolad Mahan Isfahan		1 (2013)	
(Palestine) Al-Quds			1 (1999)
(Syria) Al-Ittihad			1 (2001)
(Iraq) Al-Karkh			1 (2002)
(Lebanon) Blue Stars			1 (2007)
(Jordan) ASU			1 (2014)
(Iran) Azad University Tehran			1 (2016)
(Iran) Palayesh Naft Abadan			1 (2017)
(Palestine) Sareyyet Ramallah			1 (2018)
(Iraq) Al-Naft			1 (2019)

== Titles by country ==
Rank	Nation	Gold	Silver	Bronze	Total
1	Iran	9	8	10	27
2	Lebanon	8	4	1	13
3	Syria	2	4	2	8
4	Jordan	1	5	2	8
5	Iraq	0	1	3	4
6	Palestine	0	0	2	2
Totals (6 entries)		20	22	20	62
