= Al-Ittihad SC Aleppo (men's basketball) =

Men's basketball club in Aleppo, Syria

Al-Ittihad Ahli of Aleppo Sports Club
- Nickname: The Red Castle; Halab Al-Ahli
- Leagues: Syrian Basketball League
- Founded: 1951
- History: Al-Ahli Aleppo; 1951–1972; Al-Ittihad Aleppo; 1972–2022; Al-Ittihad Ahli Aleppo; 2022–
- Arena: Al-Hamadaniah Sports Arena (until Dec 2024)
- Capacity: 7,964
- Location: Aleppo, Syria
- Team colors: Red and White
- Main sponsor: Katarji Group, Syriatel
- President: Shadi Halweh (until Dec 2024)
- Head coach: Jad Al Hajj
- 2021–22 position: Syrian League, 1st of 12
- Championships: (1) Arab Club Basketball Championship (19) Syrian Basketball League (12) Syrian Basketball Cup (1) Syrian Basketball Super Cup
- Website: Official page
Home	Away	Third

Al-Ittihad Ahli of Aleppo SC active sections
Football	Basketball	Women’s Basketball

Al-Ittihad Ahli of Aleppo (Arabic: الاتحاد أهلي حلب) is a major professional basketball club. It is a part of the Al-Ittihad Sports Club, which is based in Aleppo, Syria. Al-Ittihad is the second most titled basketball club with 17 Syrian League titles and 10 Syrian Cups one of the most successful basketball clubs in Syria. Al-Ahli was founded in 1951, two years after the founding of the multi-sport club and the football team.

== History ==
The club, which was founded in 1951, is one of the most famous and popular basketball clubs in Syria. The club changed its name in 1972, its previous one, Al Ahli, being used as a club nickname.

The club's Great Era began in 1978 with the victory of the Syrian Cup and the defeat of Al Jalaa SC in the SBL final of the following 1979 season. In the league finals, Al-Ittihad defeated Al Jalaa in Aleppo twice 90-72 and 59-50, then achieved a third victory in the decisive match that took place in Damascus for exceptional circumstances 66-58. This season is also remarkable that they claimed the Republic Cup by defeating Al Jalaa 76-71.

Al Ittihad has twice been invited to take part in the FIBA European Champions Cup (EuroLeague). The first participation was in the 1979-80 season, during which the club, led by coach Munther Shalaby, faced in Group E the KK Partizan, BC Partizani Tirana and Budapest Honvéd SE. The club was supposed to take part in the 1981–82 FIBA European Champions Cup as well, but after its beginning they withdrew from the competition.

During the 1980s, Al-Ittihad was the Syrian League's hegemon as they won every domestic competition. The club's first major success on the international stage was third place at the 1991 Arab Basketball Championships. In the following season, the club won both home titles, advanced to the finals of the Arab Championship and defeated EO La Goulette Kram. The Great Era of domestic domination ended in the 1994 season with a loss in the SBL final with the Al-Wahda.

In the 2000 season, they won their last long title in the Syrian Cup, the penultimate title in the SBL and advanced to the WABA Champions Cup. In the 2001 season, however, they finished third behind Al-Wahda and Orthodox BC.

In the 2006 season, they won their last domestic SBL title, finishing ahead of Al Jalaa SC, Al-Jaish and Al Wahda in the Final Four. In the 2007 and 2008 seasons, they participated in the WABA Cup, but without significant success.

After the outbreak of the conflict in Syria and the Battle of Aleppo, the club's operations were limited and its survival uncertain. Fortunately, the sports club managed to survive and the first big success under coach Bassel al Hamwi was the Syrian Cup victory in the 2020 season.

In the 2022 season, Al-Ittihad won the Syrian Super Cup when they defeated Al-Wahda 60:52 in the final of the competition.

In 2022, the Syrian General Sports Federation approved the club's name change to Al-Ittihad Ahli of Aleppo SC, inspired by the club's original name Halab Al-Ahli Club; following pleads by the fans to restore the club's original name.

== Home arena ==
- Al-Assad Sports Arena: 1978–2021
- Al-Hamadaniah Sports Arena: 2021–present
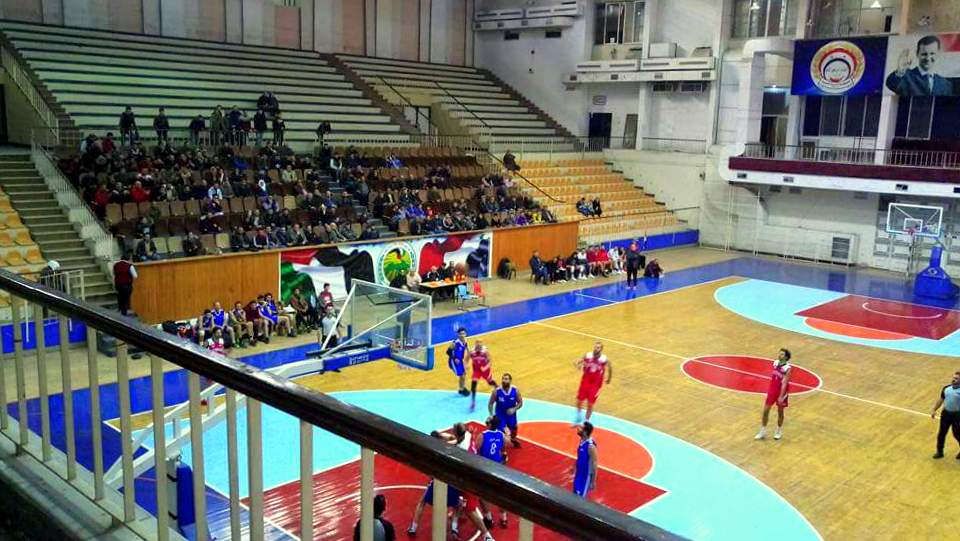
Al-Assad Sports Arena interior during a match

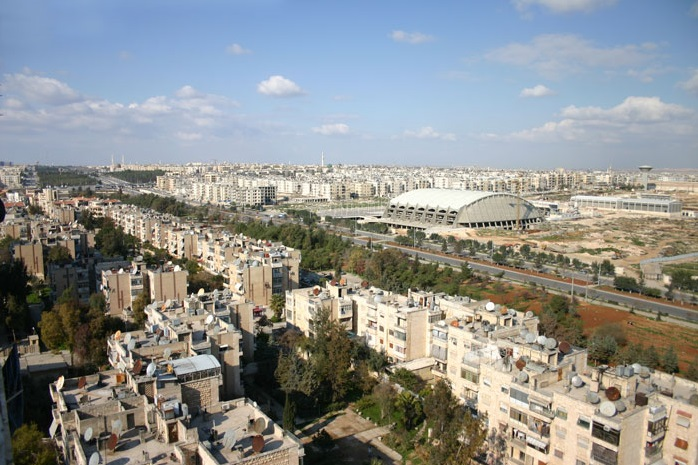
A panorama of Al-Hamadaniah Sports Arena

For many years, Ittihad has used the Al-Assad Sports Arena, with a seating capacity of 3,500, to host its home games. Currently, Ittihad uses the 7,964 seat Al-Hamadaniah Sports Arena for its home games.

== Club rivalries ==
Al-Ittihad Ahli of Aleppo SC plays the Aleppo city derby "El Clásico" with its main rival Al-Jalaa SC. also the most watched matches in Syria is the "Syrian El Clàsico" between Al-Ittihad Ahli of Aleppo SC and their biggest rival Al-Wahda SC Damascus

Other urban rivals of the club are Al-Hurriya SC, Al-Yarmouk SC (Homenetmen) and Ouroube SC.

== Honours ==
=== Domestic ===
- Syrian Basketball League
  - Winners (19): 1980, 1981, 1982, 1983, 1984, 1985, 1986, 1987, 1988, 1989, 1990, 1991, 1992, 1993, 1995, 1996, 2000, 2006, 2022
- Syrian Basketball Cup
  - Winners (12):
- Syrian Basketball Super Cup
  - Winners (1): 2021

=== International ===
- WABA Champions Cup
  - Third place (1): 2001
  - Sixth place (2): 2007 - 2008
- Arab Club Basketball Championship
  - Winners (1): 1992
  - Third place (1): 1991
- EuroLeague
  - Quarter-finals: 1979
- Dubai International Tournament
  - Third place (1): 2005

== International record ==
Seasons	Achievement	Notes
EuroLeague
1979–80	Quarter-final group stage	4th place in a group with KK Partizan, BC Partizani Tirana and Honvéd
1981–82	Quarter-final group stage	in a group with Spartak Levski, CSKA Moscow and Panathinaikos, withdrew before the competition
WABA Champions Cup
2001	Third place	eliminated by Al-Wahda and Orthodox BC
2007	Sixth place	eliminated in quarter-finals by Saba Battery
2008	Sixth place	eliminated in quarter-finals by Petrochimi
Arab Club Basketball Championship
1991	Third place	third place in Alexandria
1992	Champions	defeated EO La Goulette Kram in the final in Aleppo
2022	Round of 16	4th place in a group with Kuwait, Al Ittihad Alexandria and Al Ahly Benghazi

== Sponsorship ==
- As of 2022:

Official Shirt Sponsor	Katarji
Official Sport Clothing Manufacturer	Nike
Official Broadcaster	SYRTV

== Current roster ==
Squad for the 2026–2027 Syrian Basketball League season:

Al Ahly Aleppo roster
Players
Coaches

Pos.	No.	Nat.	Name	Ht.	Age
F	1	(Syria)	Anthony Bakar
G	3	(Lebanon)	Zaloum, Joseph	1.80 m (5 ft 11 in)	35 – 1 December 1990
G	10	(Syria)	Rami Merjaneh
G	7	(United States)	Antwan Scott (injured)
G	9	(Syria)	Isaac Oubeid
PF	11	(Syria)	Jamil Sadir
C	12	(Syria)	Abdulwahab Al-Hamwi
SF	22	(Syria)	Michael Madanly
PF	23	(Palestine)	Saleh Tofek

Head coach

- (Tunisia) Soufiane Ferjani

Legend

- (C) Team captain
- Injured

- Roster
Updated: 1 August 2026

Note: Flags indicate national team eligibility at FIBA-sanctioned events. Players may hold other non-FIBA nationalities not displayed.

== Transfers ==
Transfers for the 2021-22 season:

Joining

- (United States) Antwan Scott from (Saudi Arabia) Al Hilal SC
- (Algeria) Mohamed Harat from (Saudi Arabia) Al Fateh SC
- (Syria) Wael Jlilaty from (Saudi Arabia) Duba SC
- (Syria) Ishaq Oubid from (Syria) Jalaa SC
- (Syria) Abdulwahab Al-Hamwi from (Syria) Al-Karamah
- (Syria) Michael Madanly from (Syria) Jalaa SC

Leaving

- (Syria) Wissam Yaqqub to (Syria) Jalaa SC
- (Syria) Nazem Kassas to (Syria) Wahda SC

== Notable players ==
Note: Flags indicate national team eligibility at FIBA-sanctioned events. Players may hold other non-FIBA nationalities not displayed.

Criteria

To appear in this section a player must have either:

- Set a club record or won an individual award while at the club
- Played at least one official international match for their national team at any time
- Played at least one official NBA match at any time.

Lebanon

- Fadi El Khatib

Syria

- Micheal Madanly

== Head coaches ==
Nat.	Name	Years
(Syria)	Munther Shalaby	1978–?
(Syria)	Bassel Hamwi	2005–2010
(Egypt)	Sharif Azmi	2010
(Syria)	Bassel Hamwi	2010–2020
(Serbia)	Vinko Bakić	2020–2021
(Serbia)	Dejan Tomić	2021–2022
(Italy) (Lebanon)	Fuad Abou Chakra	2022–2023
(Lebanon)	Ghassan Sarkis	2023–present

== Season by season ==
Season	Tier	League	Pos.	Syrian Cup	Syrian Super Cup	Asian competitions	Pos.
2010–11	1	SBL	QF	QF	–	–	–
2011–12	1	SBL	2nd	QF	–	–	–
2012–13	1	SBL	No Championship				
2013–14	1	SBL	2nd	–	–	–	–
2014–15	1	SBL	2nd	–	–	–	–
2015–16	1	SBL	3rd	Runners-up	–	–	–
2016–17	1	SBL		–	–	–	–
2017–18	1	SBL		–	–	–	–
2018–19	1	SBL	3rd	2nd round	–	–	–
2019–20	1	SBL	–	Champions	No Championship		
2020–21	1	SBL	3rd	QF	No Championship		
2021–22	1	SBL	1st	Runners-up	1st	–	–

== All-time records ==
- Most Syrian Basketball Cup champions (21 championships)

== See also ==
- Al-Ittihad SC Aleppo
- Al-Ittihad SC Aleppo (women's basketball)
