= Al-Shaba Sports Arena =

Indoor sports hall in Aleppo, Syria

Coordinates: 36°12′21″N 37°08′44″E

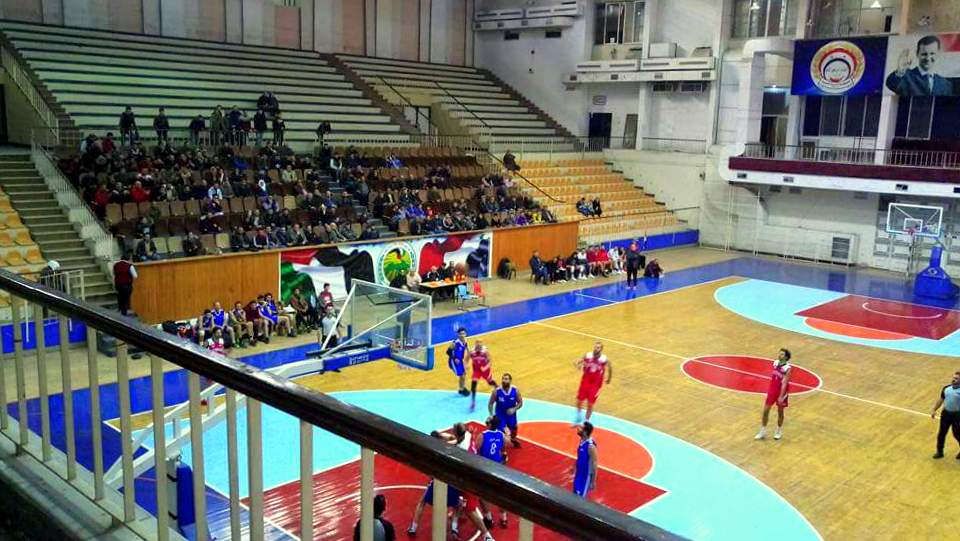
- The Sports Arena in 2017
- Interactive map of Al-Shaba Sports Arena
- Location: Aleppo, Syria
- Owner: Government of Syria
- Operator: Ministry of Education
- Capacity: 3,500

Construction
- Opened: 1978

Tenants
- Al-Ittihad SC (1978–2021); Al-Ittihad SC Women (1978–2021); Jalaa SC (1978–present); Al-Hurriya SC; Ouroube SC; Al Sekak CFS SC

Al-Shaba Sports Arena (Arabic: صالة الأسد الرياضية) is the 2nd largest indoor sports hall in Aleppo, Syria. With a seating capacity of 3,500 spectators, the arena is designated to host basketball, handball and volleyball matches. Al-Shaba Sports Arena is located in the central al-Jamiliyah district of Aleppo. It is the regular home of the domestic basketball competitions.

The construction of the arena was launched in 1968. However, the process was delayed several times due to political instability and the 1973 war with Israel. Finally, in 1978, the construction was completed and the arena was opened to host the matches of the Syrian Basketball League.

Al-Shaba Sports Arena is owned by the Government of Syria. It is operated by the Aleppo directorate of the Ministry of Education.

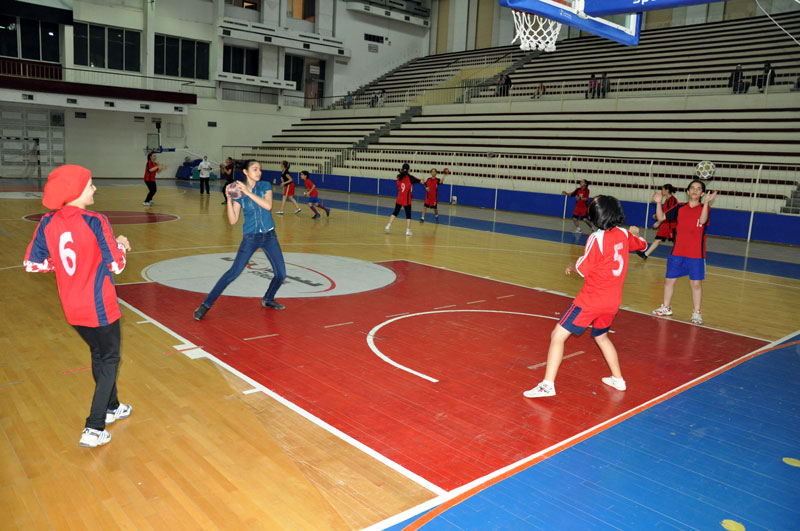
Al-Shaba Sports Arena in 2011
