= 2005 WABA Champions Cup =

The WABA Champions Cup 2005 was the 8th staging of the WABA Champions Cup, the basketball club tournament of West Asia Basketball Association. The tournament was held in Amman, Jordan between March 28 and April 1. The top four teams qualify for the FIBA Asia Champions Cup 2005.

== Standings ==
| Team | Pld | W | L | PF | PA | PD | Pts |
|---|---|---|---|---|---|---|---|
| (Lebanon) Sagesse | 5 | 5 | 0 | 470 | 388 | +82 | 10 |
| (Iran) Saba Battery Tehran | 5 | 4 | 1 | 471 | 386 | +85 | 9 |
| (Jordan) Fastlink | 5 | 3 | 2 | 454 | 428 | +26 | 8 |
| (Syria) Al-Jaish | 5 | 2 | 3 | 450 | 373 | +77 | 7 |
| (Iraq) Al-Hillah | 5 | 1 | 4 | 390 | 489 | −99 | 6 |
| (Yemen) Al-Sha'ab Ibb | 5 | 0 | 5 | 296 | 467 | −171 | 5 |

== Results ==
March 28
16:15

| Al-Hillah (Iraq) | 89–62 | (Yemen) Al-Sha'ab Ibb |
Scoring by quarter: 21–8, 29–15, 24–22, 15–17

Prince Hamzah Court, Amman

March 28
18:15

| Al-Jaish (Syria) | 77–81 | (Iran) Saba Battery Tehran |
Scoring by quarter: 25–17, 16–18, 20–19, 16–27

Prince Hamzah Court, Amman

March 28
20:30

| Fastlink (Jordan) | 83–87 | (Lebanon) Sagesse |
Scoring by quarter: 18–28, 30–16, 18–23, 17–20

Prince Hamzah Court, Amman

March 29
16:15

| Al-Sha'ab Ibb (Yemen) | 41–95 | (Iran) Saba Battery Tehran |
Scoring by quarter: 3–26, 7–28, 14–28, 17–13

Prince Hamzah Court, Amman

March 29
18:15

| Sagesse (Lebanon) | 108–77 | (Iraq) Al-Hillah |
Scoring by quarter: 28–15, 28–24, 29–16, 23–22

Prince Hamzah Court, Amman

March 29
20:30

| Fastlink (Jordan) | 89–87 | (Syria) Al-Jaish |
Scoring by quarter: 24–14, 20–19, 19–33, 26–21

Prince Hamzah Court, Amman

March 30
16:15

| Al-Jaish (Syria) | 98–51 | (Yemen) Al-Sha'ab Ibb |
Scoring by quarter: 30–13, 20–17, 26–15, 22–6

Prince Hamzah Court, Amman

March 30
18:15

| Saba Battery Tehran (Iran) | 75–86 | (Lebanon) Sagesse |
Scoring by quarter: 17–22, 21–24, 19–18, 18–22

Prince Hamzah Court, Amman

March 30
20:30

| Fastlink (Jordan) | 99–77 | (Iraq) Al-Hillah |
Scoring by quarter: 30–19, 32–22, 19–22, 18–14

Prince Hamzah Court, Amman

March 31
16:15

| Fastlink (Jordan) | 84–75 | (Yemen) Al-Sha'ab Ibb |
Scoring by quarter: 20–13, 13–11, 19–25, 32–26

Prince Hamzah Court, Amman

March 31
18:15

| Sagesse (Lebanon) | 88–86 | (Syria) Al-Jaish |
Scoring by quarter: 21–31, 22–21, 26–20, 19–14

Prince Hamzah Court, Amman

March 31
20:30

| Al-Hillah (Iraq) | 83–118 | (Iran) Saba Battery Tehran |
Scoring by quarter: 20–28, 24–23, 11–28, 28–39

Prince Hamzah Court, Amman

April 1
16:15

| Al-Sha'ab Ibb (Yemen) | 67–101 | (Lebanon) Sagesse |
Scoring by quarter: 22–25, 9–22, 16–29, 20–25

Prince Hamzah Court, Amman

April 1
18:15

| Al-Jaish (Syria) | 102–64 | (Iraq) Al-Hillah |
Scoring by quarter: 24–22, 31–20, 20–8, 27–14

Prince Hamzah Court, Amman

April 1
20:30

| Fastlink (Jordan) | 99–102 | (Iran) Saba Battery Tehran |
Scoring by quarter: 19–17, 19–21, 32–33, 29–31

Prince Hamzah Court, Amman
