= Jeunesse Sportivo Alep =

Men's basketball club in Aleppo, Syria

- Nickname: Jeunesse Sportivo Alep (Shabibeh)
- Leagues: Syrian Basketball League
- Founded: 1949
- History: Jeunesse Sportivo Alep; 1949–1978; Al-Jalaa SC; 1978–2025; Jeunesse Sportivo Alep; 2025–present
- Arena: Al-Assad Sports Arena (capacity: 3,500); Al-Jalaa Arena (capacity: cca 1000)
- Location: Aleppo, Syria
- Team colors: Blue and White
- Main sponsor: Katarji Group
- President: (Syria) Antoine Atta
- Head coach: (Syria) Aboud Shakour
- 2021–22 position: Syrian League, 3rd of 12
- Championships: (1) Arab Club Basketball Championship (28) Syrian Basketball League (14) Syrian Basketball Cup
- Website: Official page
Home	Away

Jeunesse Sportivo Alep active sections
Football	Basketball

Jeunesse Sportivo Alep (Arabic: نادي الشبيبة الرياضي, romanized: Shabibeh Sporting Club), formerly known as Jalaa Sporting Club (Arabic: نادي الجلاء الرياضي) is a Syrian basketball club based in the city of Aleppo. They compete in the Syrian Basketball League, and have qualified for the Asian Champions Cup on four occasions, with its best finish in 2006 and 2007, where they finished second on both occasions.

Jeunesse Sportivo Alep is the club with the largest number of titles in Syria and is the holder of the first Syrian basketball successes at the international level.

== History ==
Jeunesse Sportivo Alep was established under the name of the Catholic Youth Club and its headquarters was in Al-Aziziyah district. They managed to win the Syrian Basketball League for 23 consecutive years from 1956 until 1978. They also won 9 Syrian Basketball championships in this period.

They participated in the FIBA European Champions Cup in 6 times: 1958 (second round), 1970–71 (first round), 1971–72 (withdrew), 1972–73 (withdrew), 1975–76 (first round), and 1978–79 (quarterfinals group stage). However, they failed to secure any single win in all their matches in the competition.

Jalaa SC basketball logo until 2025

The club which became known as Jalaa Sporting Club won the first Arab Club Championship in 1978, when they beat Orthodox BC at home in Aleppo.

After 1979, there was a retreat from the positions, as the main rival of the Al-Ittihad SC club was the best basketball club in the country until the first half of the 1990s. The club therefore worked with juniors and youth.

In 2005, the team returned in excellent form by winning the Syrian Basketball Cup. In the following 2006 season, after defeating the cup triumph and participating in the SBL final, the team qualified for the FIBA Asia Champions Cup, where they reached the final in which they lost to Fastlink BC.

Al-Jalaa won the Syriatel Cup (Al-Jalaa International Championship) in 2005 after defeating the Lebanese Sagesse SC in the final and achieved runner-up in the Dubai International Championship 2007.

In the 2007 season, the club managed to win the domestic league and the cup and reach the final of the WABA league, where they lost to Saba Battery 79-82. In the same season, a team led by Sherif Azma reached the Asian Cup final, where they lost to Saba Battery 75:83.

In the 2008 and 2009 seasons, the club managed to win both domestic competitions (SBL and Cup), but with the exception of winning the Aleppo Cup, it did not succeed at the international level.

In the 2010 season, the CJS advanced to the 2010 WABA Cup as the Syrian league runner-up, and a 79:125 loss to Mahram BC prevented them from winning the competition. As finalists of the WABA Cup, they advanced to the 2010 Asian Cup, where they finished in 6th place after a quarter-final loss to Mahram BC.

In the 2011 season, they became SBL champions after the final victory over Al-Jaish and qualified for the WABA Cup. In the group stage of the tournament, they gradually defeated Al-Riyadi Beirut, Zob Ahan BC, Al Riyadi Amman and Al-Ahli Sanaa and advanced to the quarterfinals, in which they defeated ASU BC. The final of the WABA League in which they met Al-Riyadi Beirut lost in the decisive match 77:85.

As a finalist in the WABA league, the club participated in the 2011 FIBA Asia Champions Cup, in which after advancing from the group stage, it was eliminated in the quarterfinals with Smart Gilas and finished in 6th place.

In 2012, CJS defeated Al-Ittihad SC in the SBL final and won its last league title. After the outbreak of the Battle of Aleppo in 2012, the club's existence was threatened. However, the club managed to survive, and after the end of the war in Aleppo it continued its sports activities.

The CJS gained their first big success in a long time in the 2021 season, when they managed to beat the Al-Jaish SC in the Syrian Cup final.

In October 2025, Ministry of Sports and Youth officially approved the request of the club management to return the club's original name, Jeunesse Sportivo Alep (Shabibeh).

== Home arena ==
- Al-Assad Sports Arena: 1978–present
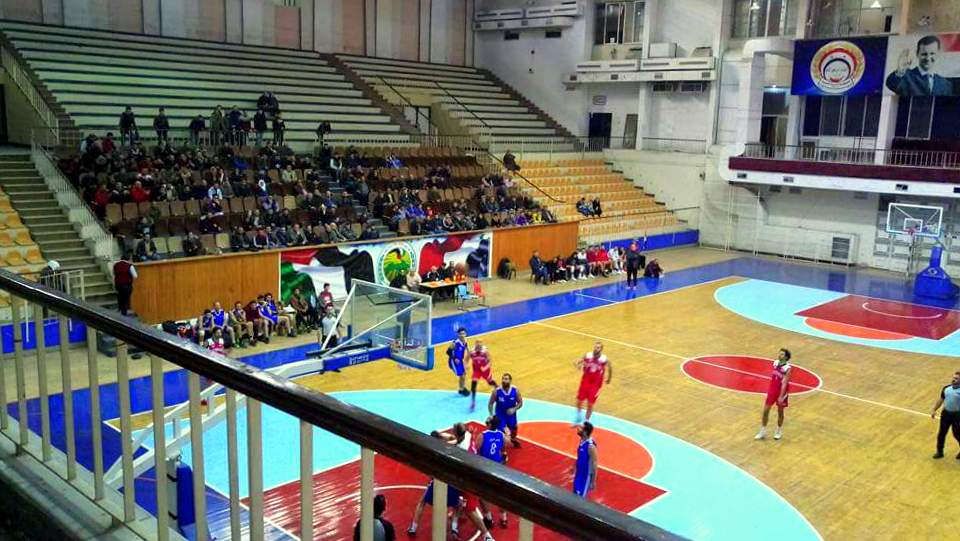
Al-Assad Sports Arena interior during a match

The club also uses its Al Jalaa Arena for its home matches.

== Club rivalry ==
Al-Jalaa SC plays the Aleppo city derby "El Clásico" with its main rival Al-Ittihad SC.

== Honours ==
=== Domestic ===
- Syrian Basketball League
  - Winners (28): 1957, 1958, 1959, 1960, 1961, 1962, 1963, 1964, 1965, 1966, 1967, 1968, 1969, 1970, 1971, 1972, 1973, 1974, 1975, 1976, 1977, 1978, 1979, 2007, 2008, 2009, 2011, 2012
- Syrian Basketball Cup
  - Winners (14): 2005, 2006, 2007, 2009, 2021

=== International ===
- FIBA Asia Champions Cup
  - Runners-Up: 2006 - 2007
  - Sixth place: 2010 - 2011
- WABA Champions Cup
  - Runners-Up: 2007 - 2010 - 2011
  - Third place: 2006
- Arab Club Basketball Championship
  - Winners (1): 1978
- EuroLeague
  - Quarterfinals: 1978
- Aleppo International Tournament
  - Champions (1): 2008
- Syriatel Cup
  - Champions (1): 2005
- Dubai International Tournament
  - Runners-Up: 2007
  - Third place: 2009
  - Fourth place: 2008 - 2010

== International record ==
Seasons	Achievement	Notes
EuroLeague
1957–58	Second round	eliminated by PBC Academic, 58-84 (L) in Sofia and 43-73 (L) in Aleppo
1970–71	First round	eliminated by PBC Academic, 69-86 (L) in Aleppo and 68-112 (L) in Sofia
1972–73	First round	eliminated by BC Partizani Tirana (withdrew from tournament)
1975–76	First round	eliminated by Resovia Rzeszów, 67-109 (L) in Rzeszów and 70-76 (L) in Aleppo
1978–79	Quarter-final group stage	4th place in a group with Olympiacos, Moderne and Wybrzeże Gdańsk
FIBA Asia Champions Cup
2006	Final	lost to Fastlink BC 69-94 in the final (Kuwait City)
2007	Final	lost to Saba Battery 75-83 in the final (Tehran)
2010	Sixth place	6th place in Doha
2011	Sixth place	6th place in Pasig
WABA Champions Cup
2006	Third place	defeated Blue Stars 2–0 in the 3rd place matches in Aleppo
2007	Final	lost to Saba Battery 79–82 in the final in Aleppo
2010	Final	lost to Mahram Tehran 79–125 in the final in Tehran
2011	Final	lost to Al Riyadi Beirut 2–3 in the final in Beirut
Arab Club Basketball Championship
1978	Champions	defeated Orthodox 84–71 in the final in Aleppo

== Sponsorship ==
As of 2022, the general sponsors of CJS are Katarji Group and Sinalco.

== Current roster ==
Squad for the 2021–2022 Syrian Basketball League season:

Al-Jalaa roster
Players
Coaches

Pos.	No.	Nat.	Name	Ht.	Age
PG	4	(Syria)	George Dolmeah
G	5	(Syria)	George Nano
G	6	(Syria)	Elias Azrieh	1.85 m (6 ft 1 in)	24 – 2 January 2002
C	7	(Syria)	Kamel Abdullalah
SG	9	(Syria)	George Sabbagh	1.81 m (5 ft 11 in)	25 – 10 June 2001
PF	10	(Syria)	Seboeh Kharadjian
PF	11	(Syria)	Jean Klze
SF	12	(Armenia)	Mahran Nerses	1.90 m (6 ft 3 in)	30 – 27 June 1996
PF	14	(Syria)	Yamen Haidar	1.97 m (6 ft 6 in)	37 – 2 April 1989
C	15	(Syria)	Wissam Yaqqub	2.12 m (6 ft 11 in)	44 – 1 January 1982
G	34	(Syria)	Sharbel Mobeiad
F	77	(Syria)	Rafayel Dolmayeh

Head coach

(Syria) Aboud Shakour

Legend

- (C) Team captain
- Injured

- Roster
Updated: 1 August 2023

Note: Flags indicate national team eligibility at FIBA-sanctioned events. Players may hold other non-FIBA nationalities not displayed.

== Transfers ==
Transfers for the 2021-22 season:

Joining

- (Tunisia) Mourad El Mabrouk from (Tunisia) ES Radès
- (Tunisia) Haithem Saada from (Tunisia) Ezzahra Sports
- (Syria) Wissam Yaqqub from (Syria) Al-Ittihad SC

Leaving

- (Syria) Michael Madanly to (Syria) Al-Ittihad SC
- (Syria) Ishaq Oubid to (Syria) Al-Ittihad SC

== Notable players ==
Note: Flags indicate national team eligibility at FIBA-sanctioned events. Players may hold other non-FIBA nationalities not displayed.

Criteria

To appear in this section a player must have either:

- Set a club record or won an individual award while at the club
- Played at least one official international match for their national team at any time
- Played at least one official NBA match at any time.

Syria

- Michel Madanly
- Ronaldo Mouchawar

United States

- Samaki Walker
- Damond Williams

== Head coaches ==
- (Syria) Gaby Arbadji (1957–1958)
- (Syria) Sherif Azmi (2005–2007)
- (Serbia) Georgi Petrović (2007–2008)
- (Bosnia and Herzegovina) Mensur Bajramović (2008–2010)
- (Syria) Robert Bachayani (2010–2012)
- (Syria) Samer Ismail (2021–2022)
- (Syria) Aboud Shakour (2022–present)

== Season by season ==
Season	Tier	League	Pos.	Syrian Cup	Syrian Super Cup	Asian competitions	Pos.
2011–12	1	SBL	1st	Runners-up	–	–	–
2012–13	1	SBL	No Championship				
2013–14	2	SBL 2	1st	–	–	–	–
2014–15	1	SBL	5th	–	–	–	–
2015–16	1	SBL	8th	–	–	–	–
2016–17	1	SBL		–	–	–	–
2017–18	1	SBL		–	–	–	–
2018–19	1	SBL	2nd	Semifinalists	–	–	–
2019–20	1	SBL	–	Semifinalists	No Championship		
2020–21	1	SBL	5th	Champions	No Championship		
2021–22	1	SBL	3rd	Semifinalists	5th	–	–

== All-time records ==
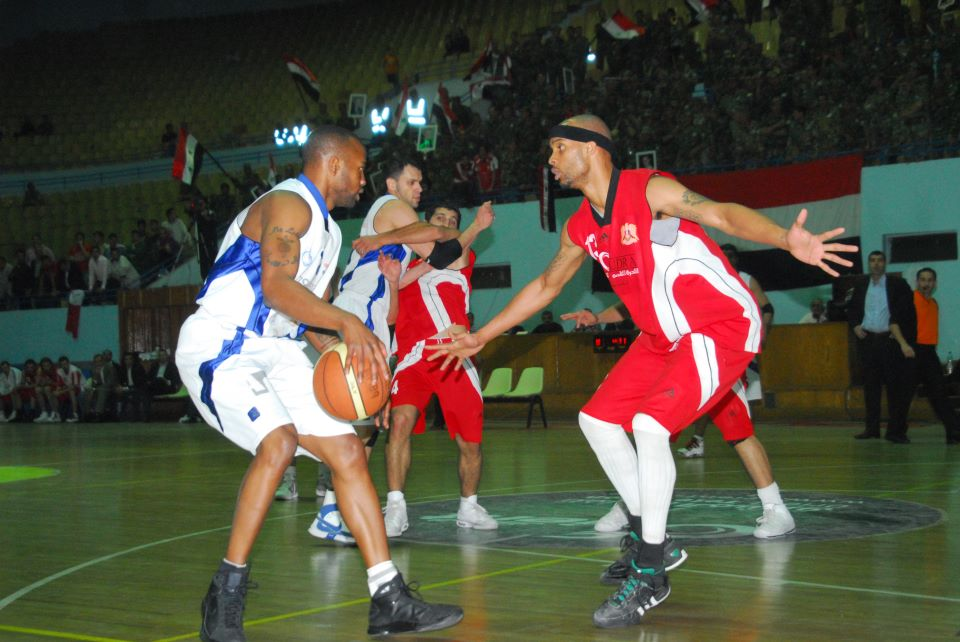
Damond Williams, 2008 Syrian Basketball League MVP

- Most Syrian Basketball League champions (18 championships)
- Most domestic titles (42 championships)
