= Al-Taliya SC (men's basketball) =

- Nickname: Hama Hurricane (Arabic: إعصار حماه)
- League: Syrian Basketball League
- Founded: 1941
- History: Al-Taliya SC; 1941–present
- Arena: Naseh al-Wani Arena
- Location: Hama, Syria
- Team colors: Red and White
- 2021–22 position: Syrian League, 8th of 12
Home	Away

Taliya active sections
Football	Basketball

Taliya SC (Arabic: نادي الطليعة الرياضي) is a Syrian professional basketball club, part of Al-Taliya Sports Club and based in Hama, Syria.

== League positions ==
- Syrian Basketball League
  - Fifth place (1): 2016 (Group B) – 2021
  - Sixth place (2): 2009 – 2014
  - Seventh place (3): 2005 – 2008 – 2010
