= 2001 WABA Champions Cup =

The WABA Champions Cup 2001 was the 4th staging of the WABA Champions Cup, the basketball club tournament of West Asia Basketball Association. The tournament was held in Damascus, Syria between May 14 and May 18. The winner qualify for the 2001 ABC Champions Cup.

== Standings ==
Team	Pld	W	L	Pts
(Syria) Al-Wahda	3	3	0	6
(Jordan) Orthodox	3	2	1	5
(Syria) Al-Ittihad	3	1	2	4
(Jordan) Al-Jazeera	3	0	3	3
