= Ouroube SC (women's basketball) =

Ouroube Sports Club
- Nickname: Ararat (Armenian: Արարատ)
- Leagues: Syrian Women Basketball League
- Founded: 1923
- History: Al-Ahd al-Jadid Aleppo; 1923–1971; Ouroube SC Aleppo; 1971–present
- Arena: Al-Yarmouk Sports Arena (capacity: cca 800)
- Location: Aleppo, Syria
- Team colors: Red and Blue
- President: (Syria) Elie Sanossian
- General manager: (Syria) Anna Marcosian
- Head coach: (Syria) Nazu Qayumji
- 2021–22 position: Syrian League, 10th of 10
- Website: Official page
Home	Away

Ouroube Sports Club (Arabic: نادي العروبة الرياضي) (Armenian: Ուրուբե) is a Syrian women's professional basketball club based in Aleppo. It is part of the Antranik Youth Association.

The team also has a men's football club.

== Honours ==
- Syrian Women Basketball League
  - Eighth place (2): 2009 – 2021
- Syrian Women Basketball League 2
  - Runners-up (1): 2020

== Current roster ==
Player line-up for the 2021–2022 season:

Betty Minasian - Nancy Begon - Marya Minasian - Rita Nahy - Naveer Narcis - Lucy Bodagian - Carla Barsumian - Mirna Akmkijan - Anna Aslanian - Patel Kirgizska - Natalie Nagar - Karen Chejo

Head Coach: Nazu Qayumji

Assistant Coach: Lucy Amirkhanian
