= Al-Hamadaniah Sports Arena =

Sports arena in Aleppo, Syria

Coordinates: 36°11′16″N 37°06′57″E

- صالة الحمدانية الرياضية
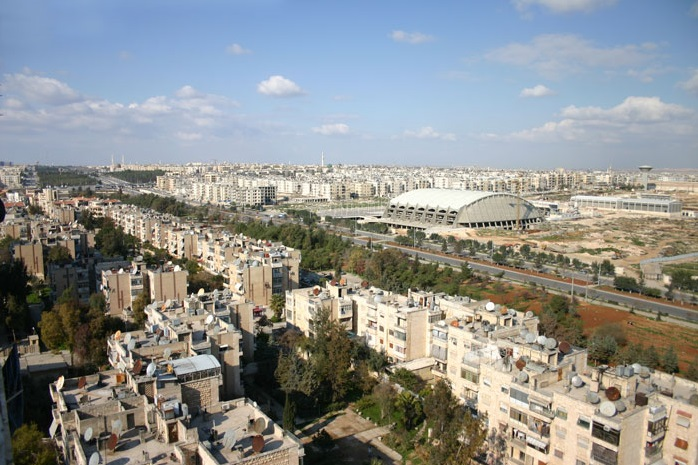
- Interactive map of Al-Hamadaniah Sports Arena
- Location: Salaheddine District, Aleppo, Syria
- Owner: Government of Syria
- Operator: General Sports Federation of Syria
- Capacity: 7,964 seats (sport); 14,000 (maximum capacity)
- Surface: Parquet, variable
- Record attendance: 13.500; Syria v Bahrain (1 July 2022)
- Field size: 60 by 25 metres (66 by 27 yd)

Construction
- Built: 2004–2020
- Opened: 17 December 2021
- Cost: LS 64.4 billion (Note: $23 million)
- Architect: Mazen Zain Al Din

Tenants
- Syria national basketball team (2022–present); Al-Ittihad SC (2021–present)

Al-Hamadaniah Sports Arena (Arabic: صالة الحمدانية الرياضية) is an indoor sports hall in Aleppo, Syria. With a seating capacity of 7,964, it is the largest indoor hall in Syria. It is designated to host basketball, handball and volleyball matches. Al-Hamadaniah Sports Arena is part of the al-Hamadaniah Sports City.

The arena is served by 4 additional indoor sports training halls. The playground of the arena has a length of 60 metres and a width of 25 metres.

== History ==
The construction process was launched in 2004 and scheduled to be completed in 2007. However, it was delayed for many years due to the corruption among the members of the Aleppo branch of the Syrian General Sports Federation. It was finally completed in 2020.

The arena was opened on 17 December 2021 by the basketball match of the home club Al-Ittihad SC Aleppo against Al-Jaish SC Damascus. In July 2022, the Syrian national basketball team played two matches in the arena against Bahrain and Iran as part of the 2023 FIBA World Cup qualification. A record 13,500 spectators came to the game against Bahrain, which was the highest qualifying attendance in the world in that period.

== See also ==
- Al-Assad Sports Arena
