= 2000 WABA Champions Cup =

The WABA Champions Cup 2000 was the 3rd staging of the WABA Champions Cup, the basketball club tournament of West Asia Basketball Association. The tournament was held in Damascus, Syria between May 2 and May 4. The winner qualify for the 2000 ABC Champions Cup.

== Standings ==
Team	Pld	W	L	Pts
(Syria) Al-Wahda	3	3	0	6
(Iran) Zob Ahan Isfahan	3	2	1	5
(Iraq) Al-Quwa Al-Jawiya	3	1	2	4
(Jordan) Orthodox	3	0	3	3
