= 2004 WABA Champions Cup =

The WABA Champions Cup 2004 was the 7th staging of the WABA Champions Cup, the basketball club tournament of West Asia Basketball Association. The tournament was held in Damascus, Syria between April 12 and April 16. The top two teams qualify for the 2004 FIBA Asia Champions Cup.

== Standings ==
Team	Pld	W	L	PF	PA	PD	Pts	Tiebreaker
(Lebanon) Sagesse	4	3	1	363	325	+38	7	1–1 / 1.047
(Syria) Al-Wahda	4	3	1	358	317	+41	7	1–1 / 0.989
(Iran) Sanam Tehran	4	3	1	374	364	+10	7	1–1 / 0.966
(Jordan) Orthodox	4	1	3	315	355	−40	5	
(Iraq) Al-Hillah	4	0	4	321	370	−49	4	

== Results ==
April 12
18:00

Al-Hillah (Iraq)	93–96	(Iran) Sanam Tehran

Al-Fayhaa Indoor Stadium, Damascus

April 12
21:30

Al-Wahda (Syria)	87–59	(Jordan) Orthodox

Al-Fayhaa Indoor Stadium, Damascus

April 13
18:00

Sagesse (Lebanon)	92–76	(Jordan) Orthodox

Al-Fayhaa Indoor Stadium, Damascus

April 13
21:30

Al-Wahda (Syria)	86–91	(Iran) Sanam Tehran

Al-Fayhaa Indoor Stadium, Damascus

April 14
18:00

Sagesse (Lebanon)	91–80	(Iran) Sanam Tehran

Al-Fayhaa Indoor Stadium, Damascus

April 14
21:30

Al-Wahda (Syria)	95–80	(Iraq) Al-Hillah

Al-Fayhaa Indoor Stadium, Damascus

April 15
18:00

Sagesse (Lebanon)	93–79	(Iraq) Al-Hillah

Al-Fayhaa Indoor Stadium, Damascus

April 15
21:30

Orthodox (Jordan)	94–107	(Iran) Sanam Tehran

Al-Fayhaa Indoor Stadium, Damascus

April 16
18:00

Al-Hillah (Iraq)	69–86	(Jordan) Orthodox

Al-Fayhaa Indoor Stadium, Damascus

April 16
21:30

Al-Wahda (Syria)	90–87	(Lebanon) Sagesse

Al-Fayhaa Indoor Stadium, Damascus
