= 1998 WABA Champions Cup =

Sporting event

The WABA Champions Cup 1998 was the first staging of the WABA Champions Cup, the basketball club tournament of the West Asia Basketball Association. The tournament was held in Amman, Jordan, from February 23 to February 27. The winner qualified for the ABC Champions Cup 1998.

== Standings ==
Team	Pld	W	L	Pts
(Lebanon) Al-Riyadi Beirut	4	4	0	8
(Jordan) Al-Jazeera	4	3	1	7
(Iran) Zob Ahan Isfahan	4	2	2	6
(Syria) Al-Wahda	4	1	3	5
(Yemen) Al-Mena	4	0	4	4
