= 2011 West Asian Basketball League =

The WABA Champions Cup 2011 was the 14th staging of the WABA Champions Cup, the basketball club tournament of West Asia Basketball Association.

== Group stage ==
=== Group A ===
	Team	W	L	Pts	PF	PA
1	(Syria) Al-Jalaa Aleppo	4	0	8	353	244
2	(Lebanon) Al-Riyadi Beirut	3	1	7	345	277
3	(Iran) Zob Ahan Isfahan	2	2	6	296	266
4	(Jordan) Al-Riyadi Amman	1	3	5	243	316
5	(Yemen) Al-Ahli	0	4	4	229	363

January 3, 2011

Al-Jalaa Aleppo	105–55	Al-Ahli

January 3, 2011

Al-Riyadi Beirut	81–66	Zob Ahan Isfahan

January 4, 2011

Al-Riyadi Amman	69–66	Al-Ahli

January 4, 2011

Al-Riyadi Beirut	67–85	Al-Jalaa Aleppo

January 5, 2011

Zob Ahan Isfahan	79–55	Al-Riyadi Amman

January 5, 2011

Al-Ahli	56–111	Al-Riyadi Beirut

January 6, 2011

Zob Ahan Isfahan	78–52	Al-Ahli

January 6, 2011

Al-Jalaa Aleppo	85–49	Al-Riyadi Amman

January 7, 2011

Al-Riyadi Beirut	86–70	Al-Riyadi Amman

January 7, 2011

Al-Jalaa Aleppo	78–73	Zob Ahan Isfahan

=== Group B ===
	Team	W	L	Pts	PF	PA
1	(Iran) Mahram Tehran	3	1	7	335	292
2	(Lebanon) Champville	3	1	7	338	314
3	(Syria) Al-Jaish	3	1	7	300	300
4	(Jordan) ASU	1	3	5	279	305
5	(Iraq) Duhok	0	4	4	299	340

January 12, 2011

Duhok	71–78	Champville

January 12, 2011

ASU	66–87	Mahram Tehran

January 13, 2011

Mahram Tehran	97–82	Duhok

January 13, 2011

Al-Jaish	69–59	ASU

January 14, 2011

Champville	86–81	Mahram Tehran

January 14, 2011

Duhok	77–78	Al-Jaish

January 15, 2011

Al-Jaish	95–94	Champville

January 15, 2011

ASU	87–69	Duhok

January 16, 2011

Mahram Tehran	70–58	Al-Jaish

January 16, 2011

Champville	80–67	ASU

== Quarterfinals ==
	Team #1	Agg.	Team #2	Game 1	Game 2
1.	Zob Ahan Isfahan (Iran)	2–0	(Lebanon) Champville	70–69	80-76
2.	Al-Jaish (Syria)	0–2	(Lebanon) Al-Riyadi Beirut	87–94	63–84
3.	ASU (Jordan)	0–2	(Syria) Al-Jalaa Aleppo	100–104	74–87
4.	Al-Riyadi Amman (Jordan)	0–2	(Iran) Mahram Tehran	63-95	62–95

== Semifinals ==
	Team #1	Agg.	Team #2	Game 1	Game 2	Game 3
1.	Al-Jalaa Aleppo (Syria)	2–1	(Iran) Zob Ahan Isfahan	89–76	76–93	91–87
2.	Mahram Tehran (Iran)	0–2	(Lebanon) Al-Riyadi Beirut	90–94	73–83	

== Finals ==
	Team #1	Agg.	Team #2	Game 1	Game 2	Game 3	Game 4	Game 5
1.	Al-Jalaa Aleppo (Syria)	2–3	(Lebanon) Al-Riyadi Beirut	91–77	79–67	85–101	77–85	0–20
