= Abdulwahab Al-Hamwi =

Syrian basketball player

Abdulwahab Al Hamwi
Al Ittihad Aleppo
- Position: Center
- League: Syrian Basketball League

Personal information
- Born: June 15, 1990 (age 36) Homs, Syria
- Listed height: 220 cm (7 ft 3 in)

Career information
- NBA draft: 2012: Undrafted
- Playing career: 2006–present

Career highlights
- Syrian League Champion (2022)

Abdulwahab Al-Hamwi (born June 15, 1990, in Homs) is a Syrian professional basketball player. He plays for Al-Ittihad SC of the Syrian Basketball League. He is also a member of the Syrian national basketball team.

== Career ==
Event	National Team	GP	GS	MPG	FG%	3P%	FT%	RPG	APG	SPG	BPG	PPG
2009 FIBA Championship Under-19	Syrian team U19	5		15.6	.409	.0	.0	.460	.060	.060	.100	.306
