= Syrian Basketball League =

Basketball league

- Organising body: Syrian Basketball Federation
- Founded: 1956; 70 years ago
- First season: 1956–1957
- Country: Syria
- Confederation: FIBA Asia (Asia)
- Number of teams: 8
- Level on pyramid: 1
- Relegation to: Division 2
- Domestic cup: Syrian Basketball Cup
- Supercup: Syrian Super Cup
- International cup(s): Basketball Champions League Asia; FIBA West Asia Super League; Arab Club Basketball Championship
- Current champions: Al Wahda (13th title) (2025)
- Most championships: Al-Shabibeh (29 titles)
- TV partners: Syria TV
- Website: www.syrbf.org
- 2025–26 season

The Syrian Basketball League (Arabic: الدوري السوري لكرة السلة) is the top-tier professional men's basketball league in Syria. It is organized annually as a national championship with playoffs and a national cup by the Syrian Basketball Federation. Both Aleppo teams, Al-Shabibeh and Al-Ittihad SC, dominated the league until 1993.

== History ==
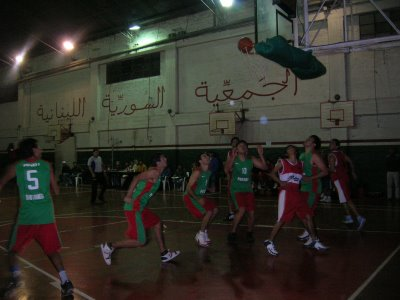
SBL during the 2008 season

Al-Shabibeh dominated the league from 1956 until 1978. Then another team from Aleppo, Al-Ittihad SC, took all the titles until 1993. Later on, Damascus clubs Al Wahda and Al-Jaish SC won some titles sporadically. In 2021, for the first time in SBL history, the league was won by a club from the city of Homs, Al-Karamah.

== Sponsorship ==
As of 2022, the league's main partners are Sinalco, Syriatel, Cham Wings Airlines, Sama TV and Syria TV.

== Competition format ==
The SBL is played by the international FIBA rules. Since 2020–21 the SBL season has a new format. In the regular season, all teams play each other first home and away.

Based on the order in the first round, the top four teams play the playoff system. The semi-final consists of a series played in the twice-to-beat format of the best team with the worst and the second with the third of four.

The final is played in the format of two advancing semi-finalists in a series of three winning matches in the best of five format.

=== Promotion and relegation ===
The two worst teams relegate at the end of the season and the two best teams in Division 2 advance to the league.

== Current clubs ==
As of 2024, there are the basketball clubs currently in the Syrian Basketball League:

Locations of teams in the Syrian Basketball League 2023–24

| Team | City | Venue |
|---|---|---|
| Al-Shabibeh | Aleppo | Al-Assad Sports Arena |
| Al-Ittihad SC | Aleppo | Al-Hamadaniah Sports Arena |
| Al-Hurriya SC | Aleppo | Al-Assad Sports Arena |
| Al-Jaish SC | Damascus | Al-Fayhaa Arena |
| Al Wahda SC | Damascus | Al-Fayhaa Arena |
| Al-Karamah SC | Homs | Ghazwan Abu Zaid Arena |
| Homs Al Fidaa | Homs | Ghazwan Abu Zaid Arena |
| Al-Nawair SC | Hama | Naseh al-Wani Arena |

== Title holders ==
| Season | Champion |
|---|---|
| 1956–57, 1957–58, 1958–59, 1959–60, 1960–61, 1961–62, 1962–63, 1963–64, 1964–65, 1965–66, 1966–67, 1967–68, 1968–69, 1969–70, 1970–71, 1971–72, 1972–73, 1973–74, 1974–75, 1975–76, 1976–77, 1977–78, 1978–79 | Al-Shabibeh |
| 1979–80, 1980–81, 1981–82, 1982–83, 1983–84, 1984–85, 1985–86, 1986–87, 1987–88, 1988–89, 1989–90, 1990–91, 1991–92, 1992–93 | Al-Ittihad SC |
| 1993–94 | Al Wahda |
| 1994–95 | Al-Ittihad SC |
| 1995–96 | Al-Ittihad SC |
| 1996–97 | Al Wahda |
| 1997–98 | Al Wahda |
| 1998–99 | Al Wahda |
| 1999–00 | Al-Ittihad SC |
| 2000–01 | Al Wahda |
| 2001–02 | Al Wahda |
| 2002–03 | Al Wahda |
| 2003–04 | Al-Jaish SC |
| 2004–05 | Al-Jaish SC |
| 2005–06 | Al-Ittihad SC |
| 2006–07 | Al-Shabibeh |
| 2007–08 | Al-Shabibeh |
| 2008–09 | Al-Shabibeh |
| 2009–10 | Al-Jaish SC |
| 2010–11 | Al-Shabibeh |
| 2011–12 | Al-Shabibeh |
| ~~2012–13~~ | No Championship |
| 2013–14 | Al Wahda |
| 2014–15 | Al Wahda |
| 2015–16 | Al-Jaish SC |
| 2016–17 | Al-Jaish SC |
| 2017–18 | Al-Jaish SC |
| 2018–19 | Al-Jaish SC |
| ~~2019–20~~ | Season was suspended at the semi-finals due to the COVID-19 pandemic in Syria |
| 2020–21 | Al-Karamah SC |
| 2021–22 | Al-Ittihad SC |
| 2022–23 | Al Wahda |
| 2023–24 | Al Wahda |
| 2024–25 | Al Wahda |
| 2025–26 | Al Wahda |

== Performances ==
=== Finals ===
| Season | Champions | Score | Runners-up |
|---|---|---|---|
| 2003–04 | Al-Jaish | No play-offs | Al-Shabibeh |
| 2004–05 | Al-Jaish | No play-offs | Al-Shabibeh |
| 2005–06 | Al-Ittihad | No play-offs | Al-Shabibeh |
| 2006–07 | Al-Shabibeh | 2–0 | Al-Ittihad |
| 2007–08 | Al-Shabibeh | No play-offs | Al-Jaish |
| 2008–09 | Al-Shabibeh | 3–0 | Al-Jaish |
| 2009–10 | Al-Jaish | 2–1 | Al-Shabibeh |
| 2010–11 | Al-Shabibeh | 3–0 | Al-Jaish |
| 2011–12 | Al-Shabibeh | 2–0 | Al-Ittihad |
| 2012–13 | No championship | | |
| 2013–14 | Al-Wahda | 1–0 | Al-Ittihad |
| 2014–15 | Al-Wahda | 2–1 | Al-Ittihad |
| 2015–16 | Al-Jaish | 3–0 | Al-Karamah |
| 2016–17 | Al-Jaish | No play-offs | — |
| 2017–18 | Al-Jaish | No play-offs | — |
| 2018–19 | Al-Jaish | 3–1 | Al-Shabibeh |
| 2019–20 | No championship | | |
| 2020–21 | Al-Karamah | 2–1 | Al-Wahda |
| 2021–22 | Al-Ittihad | 3–0 | Al-Karamah |
| 2022–23 | Al-Wahda | 3–0 | Al-Ittihad |
| 2023–24 | Al-Wahda | 4–0 | Al-Karamah |
| 2024–25 | Al-Wahda | 3–1 | Al-Ittihad |
| 2025–26 | Al-Wahda | 3–1 | Al-Ittihad |

=== Performance by club ===
| Club | Winners | Winning years |
|---|---|---|
| Al-Shabibeh | 28 | 1957, 1958, 1959, 1960, 1961, 1962, 1963, 1964, 1965, 1966, 1967, 1968, 1969, 1970, 1971, 1972, 1973, 1974, 1975, 1976, 1977, 1978, 1979, 2007, 2008, 2009, 2011, 2012 |
| Al-Ittihad SC | 19 | 1980, 1981, 1982, 1983, 1984, 1985, 1986, 1987, 1988, 1989, 1990, 1991, 1992, 1993, 1995, 1996, 2000, 2006, 2022 |
| Al Wahda | 13 | 1994, 1997, 1998, 1999, 2001, 2002, 2003, 2014, 2015, 2023, 2024, 2025, 2026 |
| Al-Jaish SC | 7 | 2004, 2005, 2010, 2016, 2017, 2018, 2019 |
| Al-Karamah SC | 1 | 2021 |

=== Performance by city ===
| City | Winners | Club(s) |
|---|---|---|
| Aleppo | 47 | Al-Shabibeh, Al-Ittihad SC |
| Damascus | 20 | Al Wahda, Al-Jaish SC |
| Homs | 1 | Al-Karamah SC |

== Women's league ==
These are the current teams in the women's league as of 2022:

| Team | City | Venue |
|---|---|---|
| Al-Shabibeh | Aleppo | Al-Jalaa Arena |
| Al-Ittihad SC | Aleppo | Al-Shaba Sports Arena |
| Ouroube SC | Aleppo | Al-Yarmouk Arena |
| Al-Thawra SC | Damascus | Al-Fayhaa Arena |
| Al-Wahda SC | Damascus | Al-Fayhaa Arena |
| Barada SC | Damascus | Al-Fayhaa Arena |
| Qasioun SC | Damascus | Al-Fayhaa Arena |
| Tishreen SC | Latakia | Latakia Sports Arena |
| Muhardeh SC | Muhardeh | Muhardeh Arena |
| Al-Sahel SC | Tartous | Basel al-Assad Arena |
