= Latakia Sports City =

Sports complex in Latakia, Syria

Coordinates: 35°33′38″N 35°44′41″E

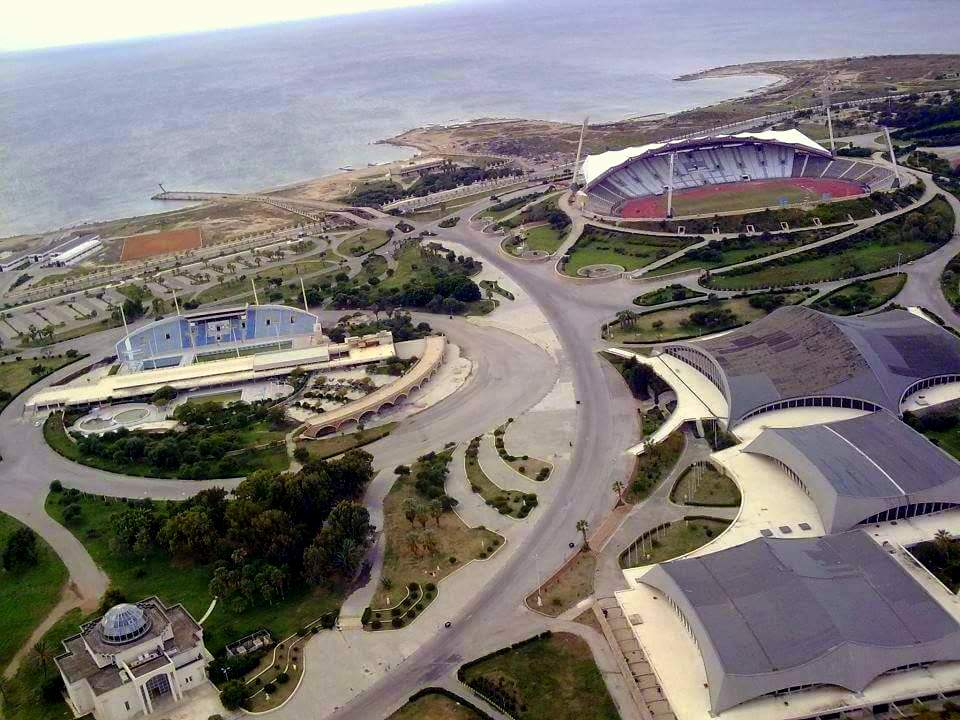
- Aerial view of the complex
- Interactive map of Latakia Sports City
- Location: Latakia, Syria
- Owner: Government of Syria
- Type: Sports complex

Construction
- Built: 1987

Latakia Sports City (Arabic: المدينة الرياضية باللاذقية) is a sports complex in Latakia, Syria. It was opened in 1987 on the occasion of the 10th Mediterranean Games hosted by Latakia during the same year.

The complex covers an area of 1,560,000 m², lying along the Mediterranean coastline with a length of 2.5 km. It is owned by the Government of Syria and operated by the Ministry of Local Administration.

As of 2018, the complex is undergoing a major renovation with an approximate cost of US$ 1 million.

It was formerly known as al-Assad Sports City (Arabic: مدينة الأسد الرياضية)

== Facilities ==
The complex is home to the following facilities:

- Football:
  - Latakia Sports City Stadium: the main football and athletics venue with a capacity of 45,000 spectators.
  - 2 natural-grass football training pitches.
  - 3 artificial-turf football training pitches.
- Indoor sports:
  - 3 indoor sports halls (mainly basketball, handball and volleyball), with a capacity of 5,200; 1,000 and 500 seats respectively.
  - 2 multi-functional mini halls for several types of Olympic sports.
- Water sports:
  - Olympic size (50×21 m) outdoor swimming pool as well as a diving pool (21×20 m) having a seating capacity of 3,660.
  - Indoor swimming pool (25×12.5 m).
  - 2 swimming pools for public.
- Horse racing:
  - Modern equestrian facilities with a capacity of 6,000 spectators.
  - Hippodrome (1,266 meters).
- Tennis:
  - The main court (hard) with a capacity of 1,000 seats.
  - 8 training courts (4 hard, 3 grass and 1 clay).
- Beach soccer pitch.
- Hotel.
- Yacht club.
- Contemporary art museum.
- Radio and TV broadcasting building.

== Gallery ==
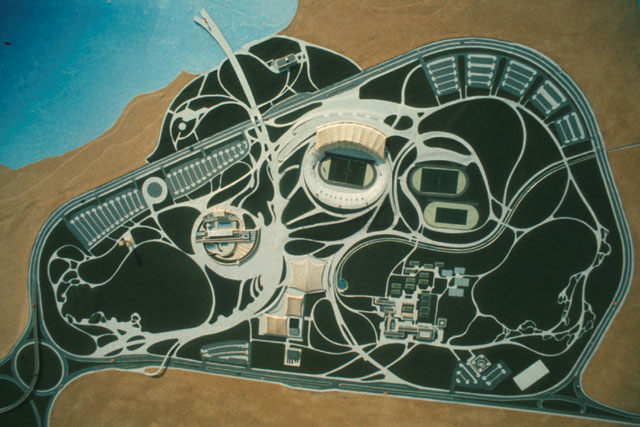
The site plan

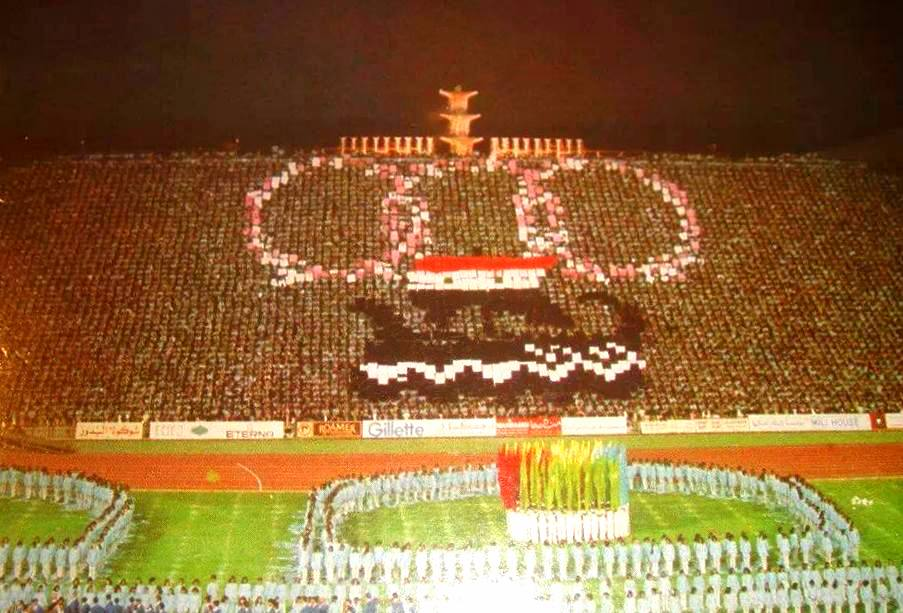
The 1987 Mediterranean Games opening ceremony at the main stadium

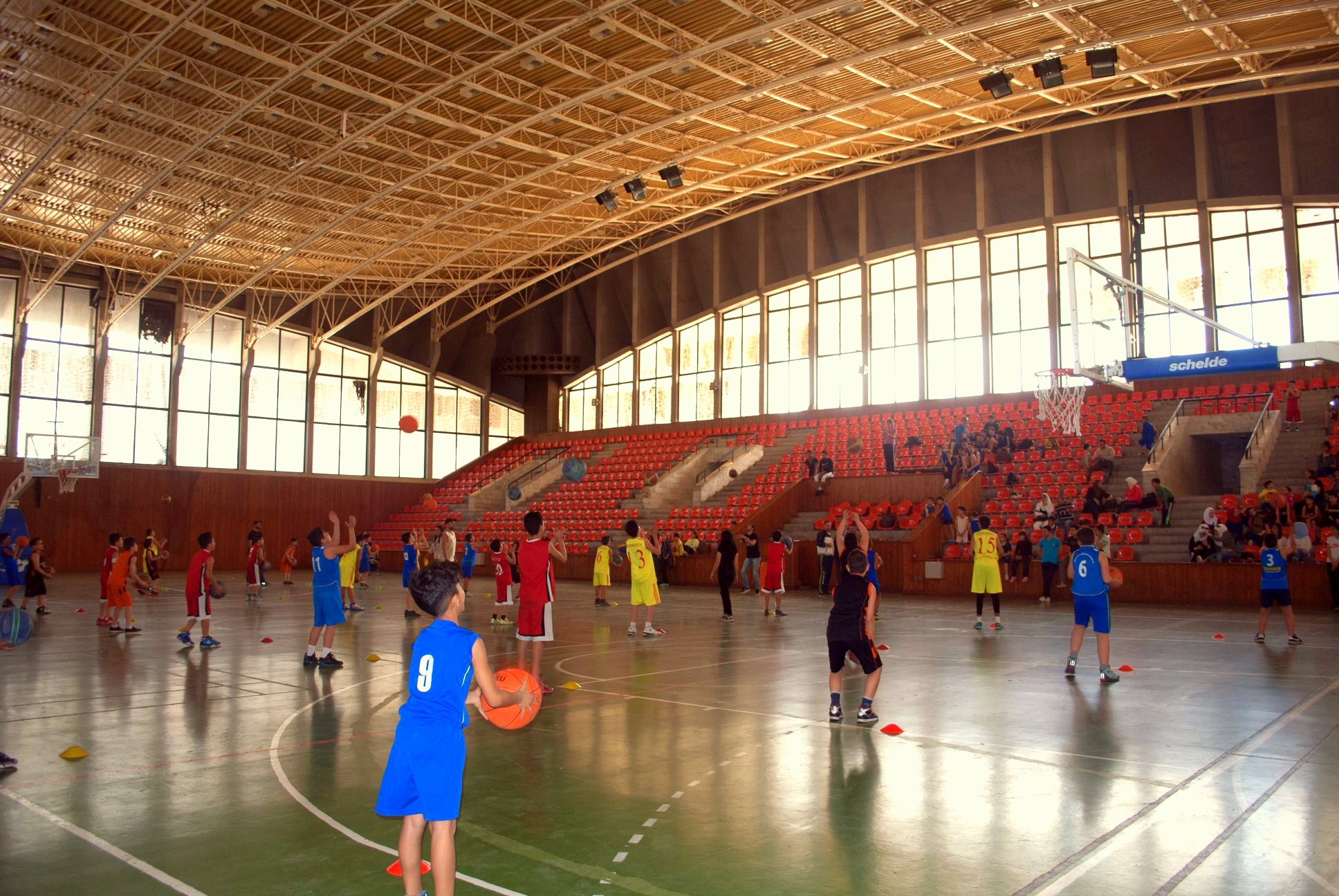
Hall No. 2 during the 2018 mini basketball festival
