= Homs Al Fidaa SC (men's basketball) =

Syrian basketball club

Homs Al Fidaa Club
- Nickname: The Knights (Arabic: الفرسان)
- League: Syrian Basketball League
- Founded: 1953
- History: Homs Al-Fedaa Club; 1953–present
- Arena: Ghazwan Abu Zaid Arena
- Location: Homs, Syria
- Team colors: Red and White
- President: (Syria) Youssef Salameh
- Head coach: (Syria) Assam al-Husain
- 2021–22 position: Syrian League, 6th of 12
| Home | Away |

Al-Wathba active sections
| Football | Basketball |

Homs Al Fidaa Club (Arabic: نادي حمص الفداء), formerly Al-Wathba Sport Club (Arabic: نادي الوثبة الرياضي) is a Syrian professional basketball club and department of the Homs Al Fidaa based in the city of Homs. The Knights are a two-time Syrian Cup finalist (2019, 2020) and they are among the six best Syrian clubs.

In August 2025, the club reverted to its original name, "Homs Al Fidaa."

== Honours ==
=== Domestic ===
- Syrian Basketball League
  - Sixth place (3): 2007 – 2008 – 2022
  - Seventh place (1): 2021
  - Eighth place (1): 2006
- Syrian Basketball Cup
  - Runners-up (2): 2019 – 2020
- Damascus Basketball Championship
  - Runners-up (1): 2009

Win the shield cup 2025

=== International ===
- Dubai International Championship
  - Quarterfinals (1): 2020

== Current roster ==
Squad for the 2021–2022 Syrian Basketball League season:

Al-Wathba roster
Players
Coaches

| Pos. | No. | Nat. | Name |
|---|---|---|---|
| G | 3 | (Syria) | Zakaria Alhusain |
| F | 10 | (Palestine) | Al-Hakam Abdullah |
| PF | 11 | (Syria) | Jamil Saddir |
| C | 23 | (Syria) | Ammar Wissam Yaqqub |
| PG | 26 | (Syria) | Anas Shaban |
| SF | | (Syria) | Joseph Yousef |

Head coach

(Syria) Assam al-Husain

Legend

- (C) Team captain
- Injured

- Roster
Updated: 5 January 2022

Note: Flags indicate national team eligibility at FIBA-sanctioned events. Players may hold other non-FIBA nationalities not displayed.
