= Ouroube SC =

- Full name: Ouroube Sports Club
- Nicknames: Ararat (Armenian: Արարատ)
- Founded: 1923
- Ground: Ri'ayet al-Shabab Stadium
- Capacity: 10,000
- League: Syrian League 3rd Division
Home colours	Away colours

Ouroube Sports Club (Arabic: نادي العروبة الرياضي) (Armenian: Ուրուբե) is a Syrian sports club based in Aleppo, best known for their football team and basketball teams (men and women). Founded in 1923, Ouroube is the oldest sports organization in Syria. The club is part of the Antranik Youth Association, which is a sports program of the AGBU organization. In general, 5 types of sports are being practiced by the club.

== History ==
The club was founded as al-Ahd al-Jadid (Arabic: العهد الجديد) in 1923 by Armenian refugees and survivors of the Armenian genocide.

Two minor sport clubs -Istiqlal (Arabic: الاستقلال) and al-Mish'al (Arabic: المشعل)- were also founded by the Armenians of Aleppo in 1930 and 1931 respectively. Al-Ahd al-Jadid and Istiqlal were specialized in football while al-Mish'al was a basketball club. Finally in 1971, the three clubs were merged into one sports organization to form the Ouroube Sports Club.

Ouroube have qualified for the final match of the first ever Syrian Cup competition played during the 1959–1960 season. However, the match which was scheduled against the al-Jaish Club was never played.

== Administration ==
Administrative Board of Ouroube SC:

Office	Name
President of the Board	Elie Sanossian
Vice-president	Henry Arslanian
Member of the Board	Shahnour Muradian
Member of the Board	Harout Muradian
Member of the Board	Vrej Kurumlian
Member of the Board	Jack Der-Khorenian
Member of the Board	Jemma Badra

Last updated: April 2013
Source: Aleppo sport community

== See also ==
- Al-Yarmouk SC (Syria)
