= Jeunesse Sportivo Alep (football) =

- Full name: Jeunesse Sportivo Alep
- Founded: 1949
- Ground: 7 April Stadium, Aleppo, Syria
- Capacity: 12,000
- President: (Syria) Antoine Atta
- League: Syrian League 3rd Division
Home colours	Away colours

Al-Jalaa active sections
Football	Basketball

Jeunesse Sportivo Alep (Arabic: نادي الشبيبة الرياضي, romanized: Al-Shabiba Sport Club), formerly known as Jalaa Sporting Club (Arabic: نادي الجلاء الرياضي) is a multi-sports club based in the Syrian city of Aleppo. They are most notable with their football and basketball branches. The club was founded in 1949. The football team is currently playing in the Syrian League 3rd Division. They play their home games at the 7 April Stadium.
