= Zain Club =

Zain
- Leagues: Jordanian Basketball League
- Founded: 2002; 24 years ago
- History: Fastlink BC; 2002–2007; Zain BC; 2007–2010
- Location: Amman, Jordan
- Championships: 1 FIBA Asian Cup; 6 Jordanian Championships
Home

Zain Basketball Club formerly known as Fastlink Basketball Club was a Jordanian basketball club based in Amman, Jordan. They compete in the Jordanian Premier Basketball League and have won six consecutive Jordanian championships in the period 2003 to 2008–09 season. The team has been disbanded in 2010.

== Tournament records ==
=== Jordanian Basketball League ===
- Jordanian Basketball Federation 2003: Champions
- Jordanian Basketball Federation 2004-05: Champions
- Jordanian Basketball Federation 2005-06: Champions
- Jordanian Basketball Federation 2006-07: Champions
- Jordanian Basketball Federation 2007-08: Champions
- Jordanian Basketball Federation 2008-09: Champions

=== WABA Champions Cup ===
- 2005: 3rd place
- 2006: Quarterfinalist
- 2008: 3rd place
- 2009: 2nd place

== Notable players ==
- (Jordan) Sam Daghlas
- (Jordan) Fadel Al-Najjar
- (Jordan) Enver Soobzokov
- (Jordan) Zaid Al-Khas
- (Jordan) Ahmad Al-Dwairi

== Notable coaches ==
- (Jordan) Maz Trakh (2004–2006)
