= Al-Fayhaa Sports Complex =

Sports complex in Damascus, Syria

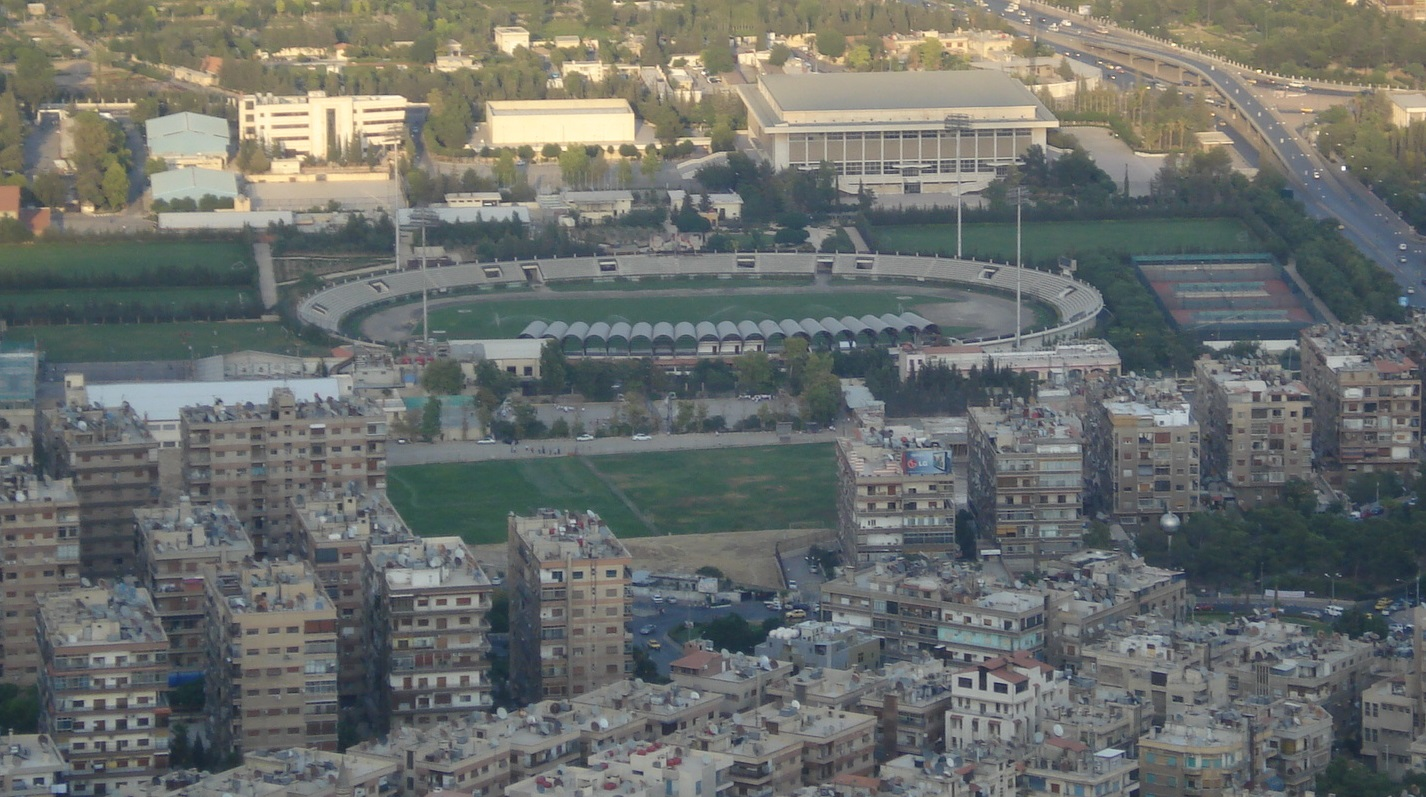
- The complex with the main stadium
- Interactive map of Al-Fayhaa Sports Complex
- Location: Al-Salihiyah district, Damascus; Syria
- Coordinates: 33°31′48″N 36°18′00″E
- Owner: Government of Syria
- Type: Football training facility

Construction
- Built: 1976

Tenants
- Syria national football team (training) (1976-); Syria women's national rugby sevens team (2018-)

Al-Fayhaa Sports Complex (Arabic: مَدِينَة ٱلْفَيْحَاء ٱلرِّيَاضِيَّة, romanized: Madīnat al-Fayḥāʾ ar-Riyāḍīyah), is a football training facility opened in 1976, serving as the headquarters of the Syrian Arab Federation for Football as well as the official training centre of the Syrian football team. It is located in the municipal district of al-Salihiyah at the heart of Damascus, the capital of Syria.

== Overview ==
Occupying and area of 250,000 m^{2}, al-Fayhaa Sports Complex was opened in 1976 to host the 5th Pan Arab Games of 1976.

The complex is home to the following facilities:

- Al-Fayhaa Stadium, is the main football stadium of the complex, able to hold up to 12,000 spectators.
- Regular-sized training pitch with natural grass.
- Regular-sized training pitch with artificial turf.
- Olympic swimming and diving complex, and indoor swimming pool.
- Al-Fayhaa Sports Arena, for basketball, handball and volleyball, with a seating capacity of 6000 spectators.
- The ball-shaped building of the Syrian Arab Federation for Football.
