= Aidin Nikkhah Bahrami =

Iranian basketball player

Personal information
- Born: February 5, 1982 Tehran, Iran
- Died: December 28, 2007 (aged 25)
- Listed height: 2.02 m (6 ft 8 in)
- Listed weight: 240 lb (109 kg)

Career information
- Playing career: 2000–2007
- Position: Power forward

Career history
- 2000–2003: Iran Nara
- 2003–2007: Saba Battery
Medals
Men's basketball
Representing Iran
Asian Games
Bronze medal – third place	2006 Doha	Team
Asian Championship
Gold medal – first place	2007 Tokushima	Team

Aidin Nikkhah Bahrami (Persian: آیدین نیکخواه بهرامی; February 5, 1982 – December 28, 2007) was an Iranian professional basketball player. He was a member of the Iranian national basketball team along with his brother Samad Nikkhah Bahrami.

== Career ==
He played for Saba Battery BC and helped the team win the Asian Championship. He was also one of the key members of the Iranian national team, winning the Gold Medal at the FIBA Asia Championship 2007.

== Death ==
Having played his last game with Saba Battery against Pardis, Aidin died in a road accident on December 28, 2007, at 4:00 am IRST on the way to Noshahr in the northern province of Mazandaran, when he lost control of his vehicle. His vehicle then collided with the crash barrier. He reportedly died on the scene.

It was also reported that there were two other passengers in his vehicle at the time of the collision. One of them (his fiancée) also died, but the other one was discharged from hospital without serious injuries. He was buried on 29 December 2007 at Tehran cemetery (Behesht-e Zahra) in the “celebrity” section (Naam Avaran).

== Honours ==
=== National team ===
- Asian Championship

Gold: 2007

- Asian Games

Bronze: 2006

=== Club ===
- Asian Championship

Gold: 2007 (Saba Battery)

- West Asian Championship

Gold: 2007 (Saba Battery)

- Iranian Basketball Super League
  - Champions: 2004, 2006, 2007 (Saba Battery)
