= Asghar Kardoust =

Iranian basketball player

No. 12 – Naft Abadan
- Position: Center
- League: Iranian League

Personal information
- Born: March 21, 1986 (age 40) Rasht, Iran
- Listed height: 7 ft 0 in (2.13 m)
- Listed weight: 280 lb (127 kg)

Career information
- Playing career: 2005–present

Career history
- 2005–2009: Saba Battery
- 2009–2010: Azad University
- 2010–2011: Rah & Tarabari
- 2011–2013: Foolad Mahan
- 2013: →Champville
- 2013–2014: Kazma
- 2014–2015: Naft Abadan
- 2015–2017: Nobogh Arak
- 2017–2018: Shardari Tabriz
- 2018–2019: Petroshimi Bandar Imam
- 2019–2020: Chemidor Tehran
- 2020–2021: Sanat Mes Rafsanjan
- 2021–2022: Sanat Mes Kerman
- 2022–present: Naft Abadan
Medals
Asian Games
Silver medal – second place	2014 Incheon	Team
Bronze medal – third place	2010 Guangzhou	Team
Asian Championship
Gold medal – first place	2013 Manila	Team
Bronze medal – third place	2015 Changsha	Team
Asian Cup
Gold medal – first place	2012 Tokyo	Team

Asghar Kardoust Poustinsaraei (Persian: اصغر كاردوست پوستین‌سرایی, born March 21, 1986) is an Iranian professional basketball player. He currently plays for Naft Abadan in the Iranian Super League as well as for the Iranian national basketball team, as a center. He participated in his first major international competition for the Iranian team at the 2010 FIBA World Championship in Turkey.

== Honours ==
=== National team ===
- Asian Championship
  - Gold medal: 2013
  - Bronze medal: 2015
- Asian Games
  - Bronze medal: 2010
- Asian Under-18 Championship
  - Gold medal: 2004

=== Club ===
- Asian Championship
  - Gold medal: 2007, 2008 (Saba Battery)
- West Asian Championship
  - Gold medal: 2007 (Saba Battery)
- Iranian Basketball Super League
  - Champions: 2006, 2007 (Saba Battery)
