= 2007 WABA Champions Cup =

The WABA Champions Cup 2007 was the 10th staging of the WABA Champions Cup, the basketball club tournament of West Asia Basketball Association. The tournament was held in Aleppo, Syria between April 1 and April 9. The top four teams from different countries qualify for the FIBA Asia Champions Cup 2007.

== Preliminary round ==
=== Group A ===
Team	Pld	W	L	PF	PA	PD	Pts	Tiebreaker
(Syria) Al-Jalaa Aleppo	4	3	1	339	319	+20	7	1−0
(Lebanon) Blue Stars	4	3	1	345	301	+44	7	0−1
(Jordan) Arena	4	2	2	314	341	−27	6	1−0
(Iran) Saba Battery Tehran	4	2	2	319	279	+40	6	0−1
(Iraq) Al-Kahraba	4	0	4	335	412	−77	4	

April 1
14:00

Blue Stars (Lebanon)	68–61	(Iran) Saba Battery Tehran
Scoring by quarter: 13−16, 22−10, 14−21, 19−14

Al-Jalaa Basketball Court, Aleppo

April 1
22:00

Al-Jalaa Aleppo (Syria)	106–88	(Iraq) Al-Kahraba
Scoring by quarter: 30−19, 24−21, 28−15, 24−33

Al-Jalaa Basketball Court, Aleppo

April 2
14:00

Al-Kahraba (Iraq)	85–109	(Lebanon) Blue Stars
Scoring by quarter: 22−29, 19−31, 13−28, 31−21

Al-Jalaa Basketball Court, Aleppo

April 2
16:15

Arena (Jordan)	80–96	(Syria) Al-Jalaa Aleppo
Scoring by quarter: 15−30, 14−26, 32−19, 19−21

Al-Jalaa Basketball Court, Aleppo

April 3
14:00

Saba Battery Tehran (Iran)	110–82	(Iraq) Al-Kahraba
Scoring by quarter: 36−26, 26−20, 20−14, 28−22

Al-Jalaa Basketball Court, Aleppo

April 3
16:15

Blue Stars (Lebanon)	90–71	(Jordan) Arena
Scoring by quarter: 19−15, 27−10, 21−21, 23−25

Al-Jalaa Basketball Court, Aleppo

April 4
14:00

Arena (Jordan)	76–75	(Iran) Saba Battery Tehran
Scoring by quarter: 17−18, 16−17, 18−18, 25−22

Al-Jalaa Basketball Court, Aleppo

April 4
21:30

Al-Jalaa Aleppo (Syria)	84–78	(Lebanon) Blue Stars
Scoring by quarter: 19−25, 20−13, 12−18, 33−22

Al-Jalaa Basketball Court, Aleppo

April 5
14:00

Al-Kahraba (Iraq)	80–87	(Jordan) Arena
Scoring by quarter: 23−19, 20−27, 17−23, 20−18

Al-Jalaa Basketball Court, Aleppo

April 5
16:15

Saba Battery Tehran (Iran)	73–53	(Syria) Al-Jalaa Aleppo
Scoring by quarter: 18−10, 15−19, 26−16, 14−8

Al-Jalaa Basketball Court, Aleppo

=== Group B ===
Team	Pld	W	L	PF	PA	PD	Pts	Tiebreaker
(Syria) Al-Ittihad Aleppo	4	3	1	315	301	+14	7	1−0
(Iran) Petrochimi Bandar Imam	4	3	1	309	250	+59	7	0−1
(Jordan) Aramex	4	2	2	289	300	−11	6	1−0
(Lebanon) Champville	4	2	2	319	283	+36	6	0−1
(Yemen) Al-Tilal	4	0	4	221	319	−98	4	

April 1
16:00

Al-Ittihad Aleppo (Syria)	77–59	(Yemen) Al-Tilal
Scoring by quarter: 23−20, 16−19, 19−16, 19−4

Al-Jalaa Basketball Court, Aleppo

April 1
18:00

Champville (Lebanon)	79–85	(Iran) Petrochimi Bandar Imam
Scoring by quarter: 14−21, 21−19, 23−26, 21−19

Al-Jalaa Basketball Court, Aleppo

April 2
19:00

Al-Tilal (Yemen)	46–79	(Lebanon) Champville
Scoring by quarter: 12−25, 12−22, 12−18, 10−14

Al-Jalaa Basketball Court, Aleppo

April 2
21:30

Aramex (Jordan)	82–87	(Syria) Al-Ittihad Aleppo
Scoring by quarter: 22−30, 20−13, 21−21, 19−23

Al-Jalaa Basketball Court, Aleppo

April 3
19:00

Petrochimi Bandar Imam (Iran)	79–49	(Yemen) Al-Tilal
Scoring by quarter: 27−11, 22−8, 17−12, 11−18

Al-Jalaa Basketball Court, Aleppo

April 3
21:30

Champville (Lebanon)	68–76	(Jordan) Aramex
Scoring by quarter: 17−20, 9−15, 11−19, 31−22

Al-Jalaa Basketball Court, Aleppo

April 4
16:15

Al-Ittihad Aleppo (Syria)	76–93	(Lebanon) Champville
Scoring by quarter: 28−30, 7−20, 20−21, 21−22

Al-Jalaa Basketball Court, Aleppo

April 4
19:00

Aramex (Jordan)	47–78	(Iran) Petrochimi Bandar Imam
Scoring by quarter: 7−12, 9−30, 14−16, 17−20

Al-Jalaa Basketball Court, Aleppo

April 5
19:00

Al-Tilal (Yemen)	67–84	(Jordan) Aramex
Scoring by quarter: 15−21, 12−17, 18−20, 22−26

Al-Jalaa Basketball Court, Aleppo

April 5
21:30

Petrochimi Bandar Imam (Iran)	67–75	(Syria) Al-Ittihad Aleppo
Scoring by quarter: 21−23, 15−14, 19−14, 12−24

Al-Jalaa Basketball Court, Aleppo

== Final round ==
Quarterfinals
April 7
(Syria) Al-Jalaa	87
(Lebanon) Champville	63
April 7
(Iran) Petrochimi (OT)	83
(Jordan) Arena	81
April 7
(Syria) Al-Ittihad	72
(Iran) Saba Battery	85
April 7
(Lebanon) Blue Stars	102
(Jordan) Aramex	62

Semifinals
April 8
(Syria) Al-Jalaa	70
(Iran) Petrochimi	58
April 8
(Iran) Saba Battery	68
(Lebanon) Blue Stars	63

Final
April 9
(Syria) Al-Jalaa	79
(Iran) Saba Battery	82
3rd place
April 9
(Iran) Petrochimi	64
(Lebanon) Blue Stars	87

Semifinals
April 8
(Lebanon) Champville	74
(Jordan) Arena	80
April 8
(Syria) Al-Ittihad	20
(Jordan) Aramex	0

5th place
April 9
(Jordan) Arena	76
(Syria) Al-Ittihad	72
7th place
April 9
(Lebanon) Champville	20
(Jordan) Aramex	0

=== Quarterfinals ===
April 7
14:00

Petrochimi Bandar Imam (Iran)	83–81 (OT)	(Jordan) Arena
Scoring by quarter: 15−19, 24−19, 15−20, 21−17, Overtime: 8−6
Pts: Lloreda 28; Rebs: Lloreda 14; Asts: Lloreda 6		Pts: I. Abbas 24; Rebs: Z. Abbas 11; Asts: Ensour 3

Al-Jalaa Basketball Court, Aleppo

April 7
16:15

Blue Stars (Lebanon)	102–62	(Jordan) Aramex
Scoring by quarter: 22−17, 24−13, 31−15, 25−17
Pts: Cantrell 24; Rebs: El Khatib 8 Asts: El Khatib 5		Pts: Lutfi 20; Rebs: Lutfi 13; Asts: Kamel 5

Al-Jalaa Basketball Court, Aleppo

April 7
19:00

Al-Ittihad Aleppo (Syria)	72–85	(Iran) Saba Battery Tehran
Scoring by quarter: 13−19, 19−24, 14−23, 26−19
Pts: Shawa 18; Rebs: Jolley 19; Asts: Kassas 8		Pts: Joseph 23; Rebs: Joseph 19; Asts: Ahmadian 5

Al-Jalaa Basketball Court, Aleppo

April 7
21:30

Al-Jalaa Aleppo (Syria)	87–63	(Lebanon) Champville
Scoring by quarter: 24−17, 25−10, 22−20, 16−16
Pts: Madanly 18; Rebs: Jones 9 Asts: Jones 7		Pts: Moucharef 15; Rebs: Abboud 11; Asts: Louis 3

Al-Jalaa Basketball Court, Aleppo

=== Semifinals 5th–8th ===
April 8
14:00

Champville (Lebanon)	74–80	(Jordan) Arena
Scoring by quarter: 25−17, 19−21, 8−21, 22−21

Al-Jalaa Basketball Court, Aleppo

April 8
16:15

Al-Ittihad Aleppo (Syria)	20–0	(Jordan) Aramex
Walkover

Al-Jalaa Basketball Court, Aleppo

=== Semifinals ===
April 8
19:00

Saba Battery Tehran (Iran)	68–63	(Lebanon) Blue Stars
Scoring by quarter: 19−13, 13−8, 13−25, 23−17
Pts: Dioumassi 25; Rebs: Joseph 15; Asts: Joseph 7		Pts: El Khatib 24; Rebs: Cantrell 17; Asts: El Khatib 5

Al-Jalaa Basketball Court, Aleppo

April 8
21:30

Al-Jalaa Aleppo (Syria)	70–58	(Iran) Petrochimi Bandar Imam
Scoring by quarter: 23−9, 16−18, 16−14, 15−17
Pts: Madanly 22; Rebs: Jones, Houston 13; Asts: Chouieri 4		Pts: Kabir 16; Rebs: Lloreda 20; Asts: Lloreda 5

Al-Jalaa Basketball Court, Aleppo

=== 7th place ===
April 9
14:00

Champville (Lebanon)	20–0	(Jordan) Aramex
Walkover

Al-Jalaa Basketball Court, Aleppo

=== 5th place ===
April 9
16:15

Arena (Jordan)	76–72	(Syria) Al-Ittihad Aleppo
Scoring by quarter: 26−13, 12−20, 18−19, 20−20

Al-Jalaa Basketball Court, Aleppo

=== 3rd place ===
April 9
19:00

Petrochimi Bandar Imam (Iran)	64–87	(Lebanon) Blue Stars
Scoring by quarter: 14−22, 21−20, 8−31, 21−14
Pts: Amorinejad 13; Rebs: Lloreda 10; Asts: Lloreda 4		Pts: El Khatib 32; Rebs: Cantrell 10; Asts: Akl, El Khatib 5

Al-Jalaa Basketball Court, Aleppo

=== Final ===
April 9
21:30

Al-Jalaa Aleppo (Syria)	79–82	(Iran) Saba Battery Tehran
Scoring by quarter: 13−16, 20−22, 23−20, 23−24
Pts: Madanly 30; Rebs: Jones 13; Asts: Chouieri 7		Pts: Dioumassi 28; Rebs: Joseph 12; Asts: Dioumassi 6

Al-Jalaa Basketball Court, Aleppo

== Final standing ==
Rank	Team	Record
1st place, gold medalist(s)	(Iran) Saba Battery Tehran	5−2
2nd place, silver medalist(s)	(Syria) Al-Jalaa Aleppo	5−2
3rd place, bronze medalist(s)	(Lebanon) Blue Stars	5−2
4	(Iran) Petrochimi Bandar Imam	4−3
5	(Jordan) Arena	4−3
6	(Syria) Al-Ittihad Aleppo	4−3
7	(Lebanon) Champville	3−4
8	(Jordan) Aramex	2−5
9	(Iraq) Al-Kahraba	0−4
9	(Yemen) Al-Tilal	0−4
