= Damian Cantrell =

American former professional basketball player

Personal information
- Born: May 17, 1976 (age 50) Oxnard, California
- Listed height: 6 ft 6 in (1.98 m)
- Listed weight: 233 lb (106 kg)

Career information
- High school: Santa Clara (Oxnard, California)
- College: Ventura (1994–1996); San Francisco (1996–1998)
- NBA draft: 1998: undrafted
- Playing career: 1998–2011
- Position: Forward

Career history
- 1998–1999: Atlético Echagüe
- 2000–2001: Ben Hur
- 2001: Las Vegas Silver Bandits
- 2001–2002: Ben Hur
- 2002–2003: Yakima SunKings
- 2003: Guaiqueríes de Margarita
- 2003: Talk 'N Text Phone Pals
- 2003–2004: Banco di Sardegna Sassari
- 2004–2005: Orange County Crush
- 2005–2006: Talk 'N Text Phone Pals
- 2006–2007: Blue Stars
- 2007–2009: Okapi Aalstar
- 2009–2010: Zain
- 2010–2011: La Unión

Career highlights
- Belgium Division I rebounding leader (2009); CBA champion (2003); All-CBA First Team (2003); CBA Newcomer of the Year (2003); CBA rebounding leader (2003); Torneo Nacional de Ascenso champion (2002)

Damian Heath Cantrell (born May 17, 1976) is an American former professional basketball player.

== High school career ==
Cantrell attended Santa Clara High School, where he was a standout athlete: he was named Athlete of the Year in his senior year in 1994 and received All-State Division IV honors. Coached by Lou Cvijanovich, he played both the guard and forward positions in high school; during his junior year he was a reserve, but a growth spurt from 6 ft 1 in to 6 ft 4 in helped him improve his game, and he averaged 22.5 points and 8.4 rebounds in his last year at Santa Clara, showing remarkable rebounding skills and a good 3-point shot. Despite Cantrell's 37-point effort in the IV-A championship game, Santa Clara lost the 1994 title to Verbum Dei High School.

== College career ==
Cantrell decided to attend Ventura College where he was a teammate of Rafer Alston and was coached by Phil Mathews. In his freshman year he averaged 9.0 points and 7.6 rebounds and was considered the best rebounder of the Ventura team. Ventura went 37-1 during Cantrell's first season and 34-2 in his second year, and in 1995 Ventura won the State championship. In 1996 Cantrell was named in the California All-State First Team.

After his sophomore year Cantrell, along with four other Ventura teammates, decided to follow coach Mathews who was hired as a coach by San Francisco. In his first year at San Francisco he led the team in rebounding with 209 rebounds (7.2 average) and was third in the entire West Coast Conference behind Brad Millard and Bryan Hill for total rebounds and fourth for rebounds per game. In his senior year of college he played a total of 646 minutes and earned All-WCC honors, again leading the team in rebounding with a 9.7 average. He was forced to miss a part of the season due to mononucleosis He was named USF Team co-MVP with Hakeem Ward. His 213 rebounds were second in the entire WCC in the 1997–98 season, behind only Bakari Hendrix of Gonzaga.

=== College statistics ===
Year	Team	GP	GS	MPG	FG%	3P%	FT%	RPG	APG	SPG	BPG	PPG
1996–97	San Francisco	29			.584	.600	.586	7.2	1.1	0.9	0.3	6.6
1997–98	San Francisco	22		29.4	.519	.190	.574	9.7	1.1	1.4	0.4	10.9
Career		51			.545	.269	.580	8.3	1.1	1.1	0.4	8.4

== Professional career ==
After the end of his college career Cantrell was automatically eligible for the 1998 NBA draft but he went undrafted. He signed for Argentine club Echagüe in 1998 but he played limited minutes (5.6 per game) and averaged 1.5 points per game and 0.6 rebounds. After playing for the Las Vegas Silver Bandits in the 2000–01 International Basketball League season, where he averaged 9.1 points and 6.7 rebounds, he had a very successful stint at Ben Hur, where in 32 games he averaged 21.3 points and 11.0 rebounds, playing 35.1 minutes per game and he was one of the key players in the 2001–02 Torneo Nacional de Ascenso season won by Ben Hur.

In 2002 he joined the Yakima SunKings of the Continental Basketball Association and he had a successful season: he started 32 of his 34 games, averaging 16.2 points and 12.8 rebounds while shooting 56.4% from the field (46% from three) and 78.2% from the free throw lime in the regular season, and in 5 playoffs games he averaged 18.4 points and 10.8 rebounds. His 434 regular season rebounds placed him 4th in the entire CBA. His remarkable season with the Yakima SunKings earned him the Continental Basketball Association Newcomer of the Year Award and All-CBA First Team honors.

He then moved to Venezuela, where he played for Guaiqueríes de Margarita. The New York Knicks signed Cantrell for the 2003 Reebok Pro Summer League but did not keep him in the final roster for the 2003–04 NBA season. Cantrell then went to the Philippines, signing for Talk 'N Text Phone Pals, where he also had a 52-point game during the season. He played the rest of the 2003–04 season in Italy with Banco di Sardegna Sassari, appearing in 18 games with averages of 13.5 points and 7.4 rebounds.

In 2004 he went back to the United States to play for the Orange County Crush, while in 2005 he played again for Talk 'N Text Phone Pals in the Philippines. In 2006 he moved to Lebanon and signed for Blue Stars, competing in the 2007 WABA Champions Cup. He then transferred to Okapi Aalstar in Belgium where he experienced two successful seasons: he led the Belgian Division I in rebounding in the 2008–09 season with a 9.4 average. After playing for Jordan team Zain, he signed for La Unión of Argentina, where he played his last season in professional basketball averaging 7.3 points and 6.9 rebounds in 12 games.
