= 1996–97 Iranian Basketball League Division One =

The following is the final results of the Iran Division One 1996/1997 basketball season.

== Participated teams ==
- ABFA Shiraz
- Fajr Gorgan
- Fath Tehran
- Foolad Mobarakeh Isfahan
- Gach Khorasan
- Mersad Shiraz
- Moghavemat Basij Shahrekord
- Paykan Tehran
- Rah Ahan Tehran
- Saina Kordestan
- Sepidrood Rasht
- Tarbiat Badani Babol
- Zob Ahan Isfahan
- Zoghalsang Kerman

== Final standing ==
1. Zob Ahan Isfahan
2. Paykan Tehran
3. Rah Ahan Tehran
