= 2004–05 Iranian Basketball Super League =

The following is the final results of the Iran Super League 2004/05 basketball season. After passing a season of hard work for all participating teams, the 2004-05 Iranian Super League came to its end, crowning Sanam as the Champions of Iran. Sanam thrashed its arch-rival, Saba Battery, 94-79 in the final match. This difference seemed to give a real shock to Saba, which came to this game, almost as an unbeatable team during the whole season. Even Andre Pitts and Lorenzo Hall could not help Saba to survive from the quagmire made by Sanam. In the first game, Saba beat Sanam 79-75.

== Regular season ==
=== Group A ===
Rank	Team	P	W	L	Pts
1	Saba Battery Tehran	14	13	1	27
2	Sanam Tehran	14	12	2	26
3	Paykan Tehran	14	10	4	24
4	Zob Ahan Isfahan	14	9	5	23
5	Pegah Shiraz	14	5	9	19
6	Shahrdari Gorgan	14	3	11	17
7	Payam Ertebatat Isfahan	14	2	12	16
8	Petrochimi Bandar Imam	14	2	12	16

=== Group B ===
Rank	Team	P	W	L	Pts
1	Mahram Tehran	14	12	2	26
2	Pegah Hamedan	14	10	4	24
3	Rah Ahan Tehran	14	10	4	24
4	Farsh Mashhad	14	8	6	22
5	Negarsang Shahrekord	14	5	9	19
6	Galin Macaron Babol	14	5	9	19
7	Shahid Ghandi Gonbad	14	3	11	17
8	Dokhaniat Tehran	14	3	11	17

== Playoffs ==
=== Championship ===
Round of 16
Saba Battery	2
Dokhaniat	0
Pegah Shiraz	2
Farsh	0
Zob Ahan	2
Negarsang	1
Petrochimi	2
Mahram	1
Sanam	2
Shahid Ghandi	0
Shahrdari Gorgan	1
Rah Ahan	2
Paykan	2
Galin Macaron	0
Payam Ertebatat	0
Pegah Hamedan	2

Quarter-finals
Saba Battery	2
Pegah Shiraz	0
Zob Ahan	2
Petrochimi	0
Sanam	2
Rah Ahan	0
Paykan	2
Pegah Hamedan	0

Semi-finals
Saba Battery	161
Zob Ahan	126
Sanam	175
Paykan	159

Final
Saba Battery	158
Sanam	169
Third place
Zob Ahan	131
Paykan	174

==== 1st round ====
Team 1	Series	Team 2	1st	2nd	3rd
Saba Battery	2 - 0	Dokhaniat	88 - 52	91 - 50	
Pegah Shiraz	2 - 0	Farsh	74 - 69	70 - 60	
Zob Ahan	2 - 1	Negarsang	92 - 98	75 - 62	86 - 68
Petrochimi	2 - 1	Mahram	73 - 71	81 - 82	70 - 62
Sanam	2 - 0	Shahid Ghandi	87 - 61	107 - 77	
Shahrdari Gorgan	1 - 2	Rah Ahan	75 - 69	61 - 70	78 - 81
Paykan	2 - 0	Galin Macaron	90 - 67	87 - 68	
Payam Ertebatat	0 - 2	Pegah Hamedan	75 - 83	72 - 95	

==== Quarterfinals ====
Team 1	Series	Team 2	1st	2nd	3rd
Saba Battery	2 - 0	Pegah Shiraz	88 - 58	74 - 55	
Zob Ahan	2 - 0	Petrochimi	81 - 70	80 - 75	
Sanam	2 - 0	Rah Ahan	91 - 74	102 - 89	
Paykan	2 - 0	Pegah Hamedan	95 - 90	93 - 75	

==== Semifinals ====
Team 1	Agg.	Team 2	1st	2nd
Saba Battery	161 - 126	Zob Ahan	79 - 61	82 - 65
Sanam	175 - 159	Paykan	85 - 82	90 - 77

==== 3rd place match ====
Team 1	Agg.	Team 2	1st	2nd
Zob Ahan	131 - 174	Paykan	73 - 100	58 - 74

==== Final ====
Team 1	Agg.	Team 2	1st	2nd
Saba Battery	158 - 169	Sanam	79 - 75	79 - 94

=== Classifications ===
Semi-finals
Pegah Shiraz	1
Pegah Hamedan	1
Petrochimi	0
Rah Ahan	2

Fifth place
Pegah Shiraz	0
Rah Ahan	2
Seventh place
Pegah Hamedan	80
Petrochimi	71

=== Relegation matches ===
Team 1	Series	Team 2	1st	2nd	3rd
Dokhaniat	1 - 2	Farsh	75 - 65	59 - 61	52 - 64
Negarsang	2 - 1	Mahram	83 - 89	97 - 82	87 - 78
Shahid Ghandi	1 - 2	Shahrdari Gorgan	65 - 54	51 - 69	58 - 71
Galin Macaron	1 - 2	Payam Ertebatat	68 - 93	99 - 83	79 - 97

== Final ranking ==
Rank	Team
1	Sanam Tehran
2	Saba Battery Tehran
3	Paykan Tehran
4	Zob Ahan Isfahan
5	Rah Ahan Tehran
6	Pegah Shiraz
7	Pegah Hamedan
8	Petrochimi Bandar Imam
9	Farsh Mashhad
9	Negarsang Shahrekord
9	Payam Ertebatat Isfahan
9	Shahrdari Gorgan
13	Dokhaniat Tehran
13	Galin Macaron Babol
13	Mahram Tehran
13	Shahid Ghandi Gonbad

- Sanam and Saba Battery qualified to 2005 WASL League.
- Dokhaniat, Galin Macaron, Shahid Ghandi and Mahram relegated to Division 1.
