= 2006 FIBA Asia Champions Cup =

17th Asia Champions Cup

Tournament details
- Host country: Kuwait
- Dates: 31 May–8 June
- Teams: 8
- Venue: 1 (in 1 host city)

Final positions
- Champions: Jordan (1st title)

The 2006 FIBA Asia Champions Cup was the 17th staging of the FIBA Asia Champions Cup, the basketball club tournament of FIBA Asia. The tournament was held in Kuwait City, Kuwait from May 31 to June 8, 2006.

== Qualification ==
According to the FIBA Asia rules, each zone had one place, and the hosts (Kuwait) and Asian champion (Qatar) were automatically qualified. The other three places are allocated to the zones according to performance in the 2005 FIBA Asia Champions Cup.

East Asia (1)	Gulf (1+1+1)	Middle Asia (1)	Southeast Asia (1)	West Asia (1+3)
~~TBD~~ *	(Kuwait) Al-Qadsia	(India) Young Cagers	~~TBD~~ *	(Iran) Saba Battery Tehran
	(Qatar) Al-Rayyan			(Lebanon) Sagesse
	(Saudi Arabia) Al-Ittihad			(Syria) Al-Jalaa Aleppo
				(Jordan) Fastlink

* Withdrew

== Preliminary round ==
=== Group A ===
Team	Pld	W	L	PF	PA	PD	Pts
(Saudi Arabia) Al-Ittihad	3	3	0	255	227	+28	6
(Qatar) Al-Rayyan	3	2	1	236	212	+24	5
(Iran) Saba Battery Tehran	3	1	2	250	243	+7	4
(Lebanon) Sagesse	3	0	3	197	256	−59	3

May 31
15:30

Sagesse (Lebanon)	58–78	(Saudi Arabia) Al-Ittihad
Scoring by quarter: 16–23, 6–21, 17–19, 19–15

Fajhan Hilal Al-Mutairi Court, Kuwait City

May 31
17:30

Al-Rayyan (Qatar)	78–61	(Iran) Saba Battery
Scoring by quarter: 15–20, 26–12, 18–15, 19–14

Fajhan Hilal Al-Mutairi Court, Kuwait City

June 1
15:30

Sagesse (Lebanon)	64–75	(Qatar) Al-Rayyan
Scoring by quarter: 11–22, 13–17, 13–16, 27–20

Fajhan Hilal Al-Mutairi Court, Kuwait City

June 1
17:30

Al-Ittihad (Saudi Arabia)	90–86 (OT)	(Iran) Saba Battery
Scoring by quarter: 21–21, 22–15, 20–22, 17–22, Overtime: 10–6

Fajhan Hilal Al-Mutairi Court, Kuwait City

June 2
15:30

Sagesse (Lebanon)	75–103	(Iran) Saba Battery
Scoring by quarter: 13–17, 20–23, 20–35, 22–28

Fajhan Hilal Al-Mutairi Court, Kuwait City

June 2
17:30

Al-Rayyan (Qatar)	83–87	(Saudi Arabia) Al-Ittihad
Scoring by quarter: 29–27, 15–24, 22–21, 17–15

Fajhan Hilal Al-Mutairi Court, Kuwait City

=== Group B ===
Team	Pld	W	L	PF	PA	PD	Pts
(Jordan) Fastlink	3	3	0	271	212	+59	6
(Syria) Al-Jalaa Aleppo	3	2	1	241	249	−8	5
(Kuwait) Al-Qadsia	3	1	2	242	232	+10	4
(India) Young Cagers	3	0	3	237	298	−61	3

May 31
19:30

Al-Qadsia (Kuwait)	74–82	(Syria) Al-Jalaa
Scoring by quarter: 16–20, 26–28, 14–20, 18–14

Fajhan Hilal Al-Mutairi Court, Kuwait City

May 31
21:30

Fastlink (Jordan)	104–79	(India) Young Cagers
Scoring by quarter: 34–20, 19–24, 22–14, 29–21

Fajhan Hilal Al-Mutairi Court, Kuwait City

June 1
19:30

Al-Qadsia (Kuwait)	107–79	(India) Young Cagers
Scoring by quarter: 31–15, 37–17, 23–20, 16–27

Fajhan Hilal Al-Mutairi Court, Kuwait City

June 1
21:30

Fastlink (Jordan)	96–72	(Syria) Al-Jalaa
Scoring by quarter: 29–20, 19–24, 25–17, 23–11

Fajhan Hilal Al-Mutairi Court, Kuwait City

June 2
19:30

Al-Qadsia (Kuwait)	61–71	(Jordan) Fastlink
Scoring by quarter: 17–13, 10–12, 17–27, 17–19

Fajhan Hilal Al-Mutairi Court, Kuwait City

June 2
21:30

Al-Jalaa (Syria)	87–79	(India) Young Cagers
Scoring by quarter: 18–16, 22–21, 22–21, 25–21

Fajhan Hilal Al-Mutairi Court, Kuwait City

== Final round ==
Quarterfinals
June 4
(Qatar) Al-Rayyan	68
(Kuwait) Al-Qadsia	65
June 4
(Jordan) Fastlink	91
(Lebanon) Sagesse	78
June 4
(Syria) Al-Jalaa	87
(Iran) Saba Battery	68
June 4
(India) Young Cagers	79
(Saudi Arabia) Al-Ittihad	107

Semifinals
June 6
(Qatar) Al-Rayyan	103
(Jordan) Fastlink	108
June 6
(Syria) Al-Jalaa	86
(Saudi Arabia) Al-Ittihad	83

Final
June 8
(Jordan) Fastlink	94
(Syria) Al-Jalaa	69
3rd place
June 8
(Qatar) Al-Rayyan	102
(Saudi Arabia) Al-Ittihad	64

Semifinals
June 6
(Kuwait) Al-Qadsia	66
(Lebanon) Sagesse	63
June 6
(Iran) Saba Battery	118
(India) Young Cagers	91

5th place
June 8
(Kuwait) Al-Qadsia	80
(Iran) Saba Battery	96
7th place
June 7
(Lebanon) Sagesse	111
(India) Young Cagers	71

=== Quarterfinals ===
June 4
15:30

Fastlink (Jordan)	91–78	(Lebanon) Sagesse
Scoring by quarter: 24–19, 24–21, 27–24, 16–14

Fajhan Hilal Al-Mutairi Court, Kuwait City

June 4
17:30

Young Cagers (India)	79–107	(Saudi Arabia) Al-Ittihad
Scoring by quarter: 24–28, 15–31, 9–22, 31–26

Fajhan Hilal Al-Mutairi Court, Kuwait City

June 4
19:30

Al-Rayyan (Qatar)	68–65	(Kuwait) Al-Qadsia
Scoring by quarter: 19–11, 18–9, 17–22, 14–23

Fajhan Hilal Al-Mutairi Court, Kuwait City

June 4
21:30

Al-Jalaa (Syria)	87–68	(Iran) Saba Battery
Scoring by quarter: 12–19, 18–17, 27–13, 30–19

Fajhan Hilal Al-Mutairi Court, Kuwait City

=== Semifinals 5th–8th ===
June 6
15:30

Young Cagers (India)	91–118	(Iran) Saba Battery

Fajhan Hilal Al-Mutairi Court, Kuwait City

June 6
17:30

Al-Qadsia (Kuwait)	66–63	(Lebanon) Sagesse

Fajhan Hilal Al-Mutairi Court, Kuwait City

=== Semifinals ===
June 6
19:30

Al-Jalaa (Syria)	86–83	(Saudi Arabia) Al-Ittihad
Scoring by quarter: 28–21, 24–21, 19–24, 15–17

Fajhan Hilal Al-Mutairi Court, Kuwait City

June 6
21:30

Al-Rayyan (Qatar)	103–108	(Jordan) Fastlink
Scoring by quarter: 32–20, 13–22, 30–28, 28–38

Fajhan Hilal Al-Mutairi Court, Kuwait City

=== 7th place ===
June 7
15:30

Young Cagers (India)	71–111	(Lebanon) Sagesse
Scoring by quarter: 16–26, 22–21, 11–31, 22–33

Fajhan Hilal Al-Mutairi Court, Kuwait City

=== 5th place ===
June 8
15:30

Al-Qadsia (Kuwait)	80–96	(Iran) Saba Battery
Scoring by quarter: 21–25, 19–27, 17–18, 23–26

Fajhan Hilal Al-Mutairi Court, Kuwait City

=== 3rd place ===
June 8
17:30

Al-Rayyan (Qatar)	102–64	(Saudi Arabia) Al-Ittihad
Scoring by quarter: 25–12, 28–19, 30–14, 19–19

Fajhan Hilal Al-Mutairi Court, Kuwait City

=== Final ===
June 8
19:30

Fastlink (Jordan)	94–69	(Syria) Al-Jalaa
Scoring by quarter: 22–19, 23–19, 27–12, 22–19
Pts: Cantrell 21		Pts: Custis 21

Fajhan Hilal Al-Mutairi Court, Kuwait City

== Final standing ==
Rank	Team	Record
Gold medal	(Jordan) Fastlink	6–0
Silver medal	(Syria) Al-Jalaa Aleppo	4–2
Bronze medal	(Qatar) Al-Rayyan	4–2
4	(Saudi Arabia) Al-Ittihad	4–2
5	(Iran) Saba Battery Tehran	3–3
6	(Kuwait) Al-Qadsia	2–4
7	(Lebanon) Sagesse	1–5
8	(India) Young Cagers	0–6
