= 2008 FIBA Asia Stanković Cup =

2nd Stanković Cup
- Official logo of the 2008 FIBA Asia Stanković Cup

Tournament details
- Host country: Kuwait
- Dates: October 9–13
- Teams: 5
- Venue(s): 1 (in 1 host city)

Final positions
- Champions: Jordan (1st title)

The FIBA Asia Stanković Cup 2008 served as the qualifying tournament for the 2009 FIBA Asia Championship. This competition is distinct from the Stanković Cup intercontinental tournament attended by teams outside the FIBA Asia zone.

== Qualification ==
According to the FIBA Asia rules, each zone had one place, and the hosts (Kuwait) and Asian champion (Iran) were automatically qualified. The other three places are allocated to the zones according to performance in the 2007 FIBA Asia Championship.

East Asia (1+1)	Gulf (1+1)	Middle Asia (1+1)	Southeast Asia (1)	West Asia (1+1+1)
~~TBD~~ *	Kuwait	Kazakhstan	~~TBD~~ *	~~Iran~~ *
~~TBD~~ *	Qatar	India		~~Lebanon~~ *
				Jordan

* Withdrew

== Results ==
Team	Pld	W	L	PF	PA	PD	Pts
Jordan	4	4	0	326	265	+61	8
Kazakhstan	4	3	1	291	298	−7	7
Kuwait	4	2	2	320	311	+9	6
Qatar	4	1	3	306	295	+11	5
India	4	0	4	217	291	−74	4

October 9
17:00

Kazakhstan	77–76	Qatar
Scoring by quarter: 13–16, 22–18, 27–25, 15–17

Fajhan Hilal Al-Mutairi Court, Kuwait City

October 9
19:00

Kuwait	81–69	India
Scoring by quarter: 10–20, 20–11, 23–22, 28–16

Fajhan Hilal Al-Mutairi Court, Kuwait City

October 10
17:00

India	48–69	Jordan
Scoring by quarter: 15–13, 12–24, 9–21, 12–11

Fajhan Hilal Al-Mutairi Court, Kuwait City

October 10
19:00

Qatar	70–88	Kuwait
Scoring by quarter: 21–25, 19–23, 17–24, 13–16

Fajhan Hilal Al-Mutairi Court, Kuwait City

October 11
17:00

Jordan	83–78	Qatar
Scoring by quarter: 25–13, 9–24, 24–17, 25–24

Fajhan Hilal Al-Mutairi Court, Kuwait City

October 11
19:00

Kuwait	82–85 (OT)	Kazakhstan
Scoring by quarter: 18–19, 19–22, 19–16, 17–16, Overtime: 9–12

Fajhan Hilal Al-Mutairi Court, Kuwait City

October 12
17:00

Kazakhstan	70–87	Jordan
Scoring by quarter: 18–20, 19–14, 18–31, 15–22

Fajhan Hilal Al-Mutairi Court, Kuwait City

October 12
19:00

Qatar	82–47	India
Scoring by quarter: 20–12, 25–8, 21–16, 16–11

Fajhan Hilal Al-Mutairi Court, Kuwait City

October 13
17:00

India	53–59	Kazakhstan
Scoring by quarter: 8–14, 13–20, 16–11, 16–14

Fajhan Hilal Al-Mutairi Court, Kuwait City

October 13
19:00

Jordan	87–69	Kuwait
Scoring by quarter: 23–12, 20–11, 21–24, 23–22

Fajhan Hilal Al-Mutairi Court, Kuwait City

== Final standing ==
Qualified for the 2009 FIBA Asia Championship

Rank	Team	Record
1st place, gold medalist(s)	Jordan	4–0
2nd place, silver medalist(s)	Kazakhstan	3–1
3rd place, bronze medalist(s)	Kuwait	2–2
4	Qatar	1–3
5	India	0–4

== Awards ==
2008 Stanković Cup Champions

Jordan
First title
