= Santa Clara High School =

"Santa Clara High School" may refer to:

- Santa Clara High School (Oxnard, California)
- Santa Clara High School (Santa Clara, California)
- Santa Clara High School (La Paz, Honduras) or Intituto Santa Clara
