= Mehran Shahintab =

Iranian basketball coach (born 1966)

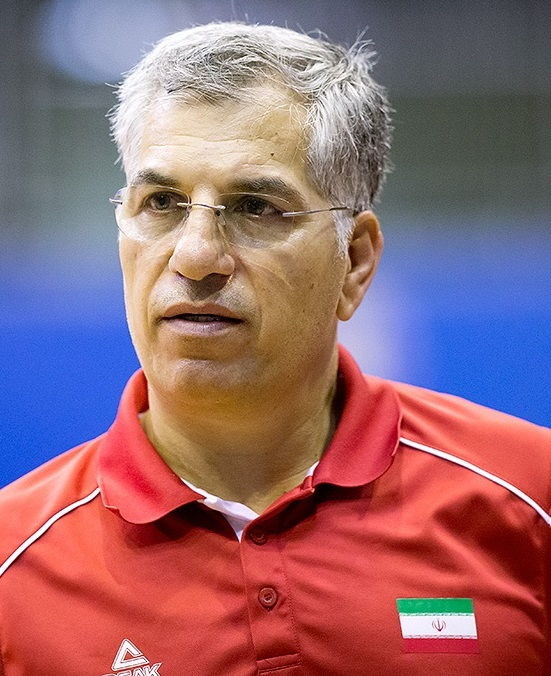

Current position
- Title: Head coach
- Team: Esteghlal Tehran BC
- Conference: Iran Basketball League

Biographical details
- Born: March 21, 1966 (age 60); Kermanshah, Iran

Coaching career (HC unless noted)
- 1999–2000: Peykan
- 2001–2008: Saba Battery
- 2008–2010: Saba Mehr
- 2010–2011: Petrochimi
- 2012–2014: Azad University
- 2015–2018: Petrochimi
- 2019–2020: Shahrdari Gorgan
- 2021–2022: Chemidor Qom
- 2022–2022: Al Shamal
- 2023–2024: Al Sadd Basketball Team

Accomplishments and honors

Championships
- FIBA Asia Championship (2013); FIBA Asia Cup (2014)

Awards
- Best Head Coach of the year, Iran National Basketball Super-league 2020; Best Head Coach of the tournament, Dubai International Tournament 2008; National Head Coach of the year – all sports, I.R. Iran 2004

Mehran Shahintab (born March 21, 1966 Kermanshah) is an Iranian professional basketball coach. Currently, he is head coach of the Esteghlal Tehran Basketball Team.

== Playing career ==
Shahintab began his career at the age of 16 and soon became a member of the Iran National Junior Team in 1985. From 1991 to 1998 he played for Rah-Ahan Basketball Club for 8 consecutive seasons. Shahintab joined Peykan Basketball Club in 1998 and with them, he reached the I.R. Iran Super League final.

In total, he played 16 seasons in Iran's top-tier level super league, playing with Pas, Persepolis, Rah-Ahan, Peykan, and Azad University Basketball Club.

Shahintab's first competition with the senior Iran National basketball team was the 1989 ABC Championship in Beijing, China. He helped Iran National basketball team to achieve the 4th place in 1993 ABC Championship in Jakarta. In 1995 after playing for Iran National basketball team in Asian Basketball Confederation (ABC) Championship in Seoul.Shahintab announced his retirement from international competition.

== Coaching career ==
Shahintab started his coaching career in the early 2000s, as the assistant head coach of Peykan Basketball Club, and then head coach of Saba Battery Basketball Club In 2001 to 2008, Shahintab won the Iranian national league title four times as well as at two times FIBA Asia Championship with Saba Battery. From 2008 to 2010, he coached Sabbs Mehr Club and won 3rd place in the 2009 Champions West Asian Basketball Association (WABA) cup in Jordan. In 2010 he became the head coach of Petrochimi Bandar Imam Basketball Club, and lead the club for 2011, 3rd place, Champions West Asian Basketball Association (WABA) cup in Lebanon. From 2012 to 2014, Shahintab was the head coach of Azad University Basketball Club. In two seasons with the club, he led the club to 3rd Place in Iran National Basketball Super-league in 2013 and 2014, Runner-up, Iran National Basketball Super-league. From 2015 to 2018, Shahintab was the head coach of Petrochimi Bandar Imam Basketball Club. In three seasons with the club, he was able to win the Iran National Basketball Super-league, the West Asian Basketball Association (WABA) cup in Jordan, and made it to the 2017 West Asian Basketball Association (WABA) cup in Jordan Final.

== National team coaching ==
=== Iran National men's Junior basketball team U16 and U18 (2000-2004) ===
In 2000, Shahintab was named the head coach of the Iran national men's junior basketball team. With Iran's U18, he took the silver medal at the WABA Championship U18 in Yemen 2000. With U16 he took the gold medal at the WABA Championship U16 in Tehran 2001, gold medal at the WABA Championship U16 in Jordan 2002, and finally the first gold medal in Iran's basketball history in Asia continent at the 2004 FIBA Asia Under-18 Championship at Bangalore, India.
