= 2003–04 Iranian Basketball Super League =

The following is the final results of the Iran Super League 2003/04 basketball season.

== Regular season ==
Rank	Team	Pld	W	L	Pts
1	Saba Battery Tehran	22	20	2	42
2	Sanam Tehran	22	20	2	42
3	Paykan Tehran	22	18	4	40
4	Zob Ahan Isfahan	22	17	5	39
5	Ghaem Reza Isfahan	22	13	9	35
6	Pegah Shiraz	22	12	10	34
7	Shahrdari Gorgan	22	9	13	31
8	Homa Tehran	22	7	15	29
9	Iran Nara Tehran	22	5	17	27
10	Petrochimi Bandar Imam	22	4	18	26
11	Negarsang Shahrekord	22	4	18	26
12	Rah Ahan Tehran	22	3	19	25

== Playoffs ==
Semi-finals
1	Saba Battery	75	87	–
4	Zob Ahan	67	70	–
3	Paykan	81	66	–
2	Sanam	89	69	–

Final
1	Saba Battery	77	72	76
2	Sanam	88	68	71
3rd place
4	Zob Ahan	90	63	75
3	Paykan	87	75	71

- Saba Battery qualified to WABA Champions Cup 2005.
