= San Miguel-Team Pilipinas =

San Miguel-Team Pilipinas basketball team
- Leagues: Philippine Basketball Association
- Founded: 2005
- History: San Miguel Beer; 2005–2007; San Miguel-Magnolia; 2005–2007; San Mig Coffee; 2005–2007; Purefoods Carne Norte Supremo; 2005–2007
- Arena: None
- Location: Philippines
- Team colors: Blue, white and red
- Head coach: Chot Reyes
- Championships: 2005 Brunei Cup; 2006 Brunei Cup
- Website: San Miguel Corporation
Home	Away

San Miguel-Team Pilipinas was the basketball team that represented the Philippines in international competitions from 2005 to 2007. The team was organized by the Philippine Basketball Association (PBA) during the period when the Basketball Association of the Philippines (BAP), the national sport association for basketball, was suspended by FIBA. The team was sponsored by San Miguel Corporation. San Miguel-Team Pilipinas was succeeded in 2009 by Powerade-Team Pilipinas, sponsored by Coca-Cola Bottlers Philippines, Inc.

The team represented the country in the 2005 FIBA Asia Champions Cup (fifth), the Las Vegas Global Hoop Summit (most exciting performing team), the William Jones Cup (third), and the 2005 Shell Rimula-Sultan Cup of Brunei (Champion). The team was bannered by Asi Taulava, Rommel Adducul, and Ren-Ren Ritualo. The Philippines was suspended by the International Basketball Federation (FIBA) due to political conflict between leaders of the Philippine Olympic Committee (POC) and the Basketball Association of the Philippines (BAP).

In 2006, it finished sixth in the William Jones Cup and fourth in the Al-Emadi International Basketball Tournament, held at Doha, Qatar. The team has recently played in a goodwill series against Lebanon and won the Shell Rimula-Sultan Cup title in Brunei for the second year in a row.

After the FIBA suspension of the BAP was lifted in February 2007, the team underwent intensive training in the United States training camp that was attended before by NBA players. During the said training trip, they also played some tune up games with some NCAA teams. Next stop for San Miguel–Team Pilipinas was the FIBA Asia Champions Cup 2007 held in Tehran, Iran. They played mostly against Arab teams that have two imports while they played without an import. After playing 8 games in 8 days, they finished 4th place in the tourney, a creditable showing as all the other teams played with imports.

== List of players ==
Pos.
No.
Player
School
SG
4
Mark Caguioa
(United States) Glendale
PF/C
5
Danny Seigle
(United States) Wagner
PG
6
Jimmy Alapag
(United States) CSU San Bernardino
SG
7
Dondon Hontiveros
(Philippines) University of Cebu
C
8
Asi Taulava
(United States) BYU–Hawaii
PF/C
9
Ranidel de Ocampo
(Philippines) St. Francis of Assisi
PF
10
Enrico Villanueva
(Philippines) Ateneo de Manila
PF/C
11
Mick Pennisi
(United States) Eastern Michigan
PF
12
Kerby Raymundo
(Philippines) San Juan de Letran
PG
13
Jayjay Helterbrand
(United States) Kentucky State
SG/SF
14
Ren-Ren Ritualo
(Philippines) De La Salle
PF/SF
15
Tony dela Cruz
(United States) UC Irvine

Pos.	No.	Player	School
PF/C	RL	Rommel Adducul	(Philippines) San Sebsatian
PF	RL	Rudy Hatfield	(United States) UM–Dearborn
PF/C	IL	Rafi Reavis	(United States) Coppin State
SF	RL	Niño Canaleta	(Philippines) UE
SF	RL	Kelly Williams	(United States) Oakland
SG	RL	Gabe Norwood	(United States) George Mason
Position			Name/s
Head coach:			(Philippines) Chot Reyes
Assistants:			(Philippines) Aboy Castro, (Philippines) Nash Racela
Consultants: Scout:			(United States) Tim Cone, (United States) Norman Black, (Philippines) Jong Uichico, (Philippines) Ryan Gregorio (Philippines) Binky Favis
Manager:			(Philippines) Robert Non
IL= Injured list RL= Reserve list			(Philippines) San Miguel
