= 2005–06 Iranian Basketball Super League =

The following is the final results of the Iran Super League 2005/06 basketball season. The powerhouse Saba Battery were crowned champions of Iran's Super League, beating Petrochimi of Mahshahr 3 times in a row in the final phase of the competitions which was 3 out of 5. Saba had only one loss through the whole season in a game against Pegah of Shiraz, and it kept its dominancy over the other teams. In the third and last clash, Garth Joseph, the tallest import in the Iranian Super League (218 cm) made the last shot in just 1 second to the end of the match, and changed the score to 66-64.

== Regular season ==
=== Group A ===
Rank	Team	P	W	L	Pts
1	Petrochimi Bandar Imam	14	12	2	26
2	Sanam Tehran	14	10	4	24
3	Zob Ahan Isfahan	14	10	4	24
4	Pegah Shiraz	14	9	5	23
5	Gol Gohar Sirjan	14	7	7	21
6	Shahrdari Gorgan	14	5	9	19
7	Farsh Mashhad	14	4	10	18
8	Azad University Tehran	14	0	14	14

=== Group B ===
Rank	Team	P	W	L	Pts
1	Saba Battery Tehran	14	14	0	28
2	Paykan Tehran	14	11	3	25
3	Azarpayam Urmia	14	10	4	24
4	Pegah Hamedan	14	8	6	22
5	Heyat Basketball Khuzestan	14	5	9	19
6	Mahram Tehran	14	4	10	18
7	Heyat Basketball Isfahan	14	3	11	17
8	Heyat Basketball Shahrekord	14	1	13	15

== Playoffs ==
=== Championship ===
Quarter-finals
Petrochimi	2
Pegah Hamedan	0
Zob Ahan	0
Paykan	2
Sanam	2
Azarpayam	0
Pegah Shiraz	1
Saba Battery	2

Semi-finals
Petrochimi	2
Paykan	0
Sanam	0
Saba Battery	2

Final
Petrochimi	0
Saba Battery	3
Third place
Paykan	3
Sanam	2

==== Quarterfinals ====
Team 1	Series	Team 2	1st	2nd	3rd
Petrochimi	2 - 0	Pegah Hamedan	94 - 91	84 - 73	
Zob Ahan	0 - 2	Paykan	57 - 65	40 - 70	
Sanam	2 - 0	Azarpayam	77 - 65	82 - 73	
Pegah Shiraz	1 - 2	Saba Battery	86 - 84	85 - 88	70 - 73

==== Semifinals ====
Team 1	Series	Team 2	1st	2nd	3rd
Petrochimi	2 - 0	Paykan	82 - 70	73 - 66	
Sanam	0 - 2	Saba Battery	73 - 81	88 - 90	

==== 3rd place match ====
Team 1	Series	Team 2	1st	2nd	3rd	4th	5th
Paykan	3 - 2	Sanam	76 - 78	80 - 86	85 - 72	75 - 74	69 - 67

==== Final ====
Team 1	Series	Team 2	1st	2nd	3rd	4th	5th
Petrochimi	0 - 3	Saba Battery	78 - 81	65 - 67	64 - 66		

=== Classifications ===
==== 5th-8th places ====
Semi-finals
Pegah Hamedan	0
Zob Ahan	2
Azarpayam	0
Pegah Shiraz	2

5th place
Zob Ahan	0
Pegah Shiraz	2
7th place
Pegah Hamedan	1
Azarpayam	0

==== 9th-16th places ====
Quarter-finals
Gol Gohar	2
HB Shahrekord	0
Farsh	0
Mahram	2
Shahrdari Gorgan	2
HB Isfahan	0
Azad University	1
HB Khuzestan	2

Semi-finals
Gol Gohar	152
Mahram	150
Shahrdari Gorgan	57
HB Khuzestan	84

9th place
Gol Gohar	69
HB Khuzestan	66
11th place
Mahram	w/o
Shahrdari Gorgan

==== 13th-16th places ====
Semi-finals
HB Shahrekord	2
Farsh	0
HB Isfahan	0
Azad University	2

13th place
HB Shahrekord
Azad University	w/o
15th place
Farsh
HB Isfahan	w/o

== Final ranking ==
Rank	Team
1	Saba Battery Tehran
2	Petrochimi Bandar Imam
3	Paykan Tehran
4	Sanam Tehran
5	Pegah Shiraz
6	Zob Ahan Isfahan
7	Pegah Hamedan
8	Azarpayam Urmia
9	Gol Gohar Sirjan
10	Heyat Basketball Khuzestan
11	Mahram Tehran
12	Shahrdari Gorgan
13	Azad University Tehran
14	Heyat Basketball Shahrekord
15	Heyat Basketball Isfahan
16	Farsh Mashhad

- Saba Battery and Petrochimi qualified to WABA Champions Cup 2007.
- HB Isfahan and Farsh Mashhad relegated to Division 1.
