= 2002 ABC Under-18 Championship =

2002 FIBA Under-18 Asia Cup
17th FIBA Under-18 Asian Basketball Championship

Tournament details
- Host country: Kuwait
- Dates: December 16–26
- Teams: 14
- Venue(s): 1 (in 1 host city)

Final positions
- Champions: China (7th title)

The FIBA Asia Under-18 Championship 2002 is the 17th edition of the International Basketball Federation FIBA Asia's youth championship for basketball. The games were held at Kuwait City from December 16–26, 2002.

== Draw ==
Group A	Group B	Group C	Group D
South Korea; Iran; Lebanon; ~~Mongolia~~ *	China; Qatar; Malaysia; Sri Lanka	Chinese Taipei; Hong Kong; India; Kuwait	Japan; Saudi Arabia; ~~Thailand~~ * ~~Bahrain~~ *

* Mongolia, Thailand and Bahrain withdrew from the tournament; Yemen was later added to Group D.

== Preliminary round ==
=== Group A ===
Team	Pld	W	L	PF	PA	PD	Pts	Tiebreaker
South Korea	2	1	1	131	129	+2	3	1–1 / 1.016
Iran	2	1	1	136	137	−1	3	1–1 / 0.993
Lebanon	2	1	1	116	117	−1	3	1–1 / 0.991

December 16
19:00

Iran	63–60	Lebanon

Fajhan Hilal Al-Mutairi Court, Kuwait City

December 17
17:00

Lebanon	56–54	South Korea

Fajhan Hilal Al-Mutairi Court, Kuwait City

December 18
9:00

South Korea	77–73	Iran

Fajhan Hilal Al-Mutairi Court, Kuwait City

=== Group B ===
Team	Pld	W	L	PF	PA	PD	Pts
China	3	3	0	301	156	+145	6
Qatar	3	2	1	236	208	+28	5
Malaysia	3	1	2	210	201	+9	4
Sri Lanka	3	0	3	167	349	−182	3

December 16
11:00

Qatar	73–58	Malaysia

Fajhan Hilal Al-Mutairi Court, Kuwait City

December 16
15:00

China	145–45	Sri Lanka

Fajhan Hilal Al-Mutairi Court, Kuwait City

December 17
9:00

Malaysia	47–79	China

Fajhan Hilal Al-Mutairi Court, Kuwait City

December 17
11:00

Sri Lanka	73–99	Qatar

Fajhan Hilal Al-Mutairi Court, Kuwait City

December 18
13:00

Malaysia	105–49	Sri Lanka

Fajhan Hilal Al-Mutairi Court, Kuwait City

December 18
19:00

China	77–64	Qatar

Fajhan Hilal Al-Mutairi Court, Kuwait City

=== Group C ===
Team	Pld	W	L	PF	PA	PD	Pts
Chinese Taipei	3	3	0	294	177	+117	6
Kuwait	3	2	1	203	206	−3	5
Hong Kong	3	1	2	212	247	−35	4
India	3	0	3	227	306	−79	3

December 16
9:00

Chinese Taipei	101–59	Hong Kong

Fajhan Hilal Al-Mutairi Court, Kuwait City

December 16
17:00

India	78–88	Kuwait

Fajhan Hilal Al-Mutairi Court, Kuwait City

December 17
15:00

India	71–120	Chinese Taipei

Fajhan Hilal Al-Mutairi Court, Kuwait City

December 17
19:00

Kuwait	68–55	Hong Kong

Fajhan Hilal Al-Mutairi Court, Kuwait City

December 18
15:00

Hong Kong	98–78	India

Fajhan Hilal Al-Mutairi Court, Kuwait City

December 18
17:00

Chinese Taipei	73–47	Kuwait

Fajhan Hilal Al-Mutairi Court, Kuwait City

=== Group D ===
Team	Pld	W	L	PF	PA	PD	Pts
Japan	2	2	0	228	147	+81	4
Saudi Arabia	2	1	1	168	138	+30	3
Yemen	2	0	2	111	222	−111	2

December 16
13:00

Japan	137–64	Yemen
Scoring by quarter: 35–15, 27–20, 35–16, 40–13

Fajhan Hilal Al-Mutairi Court, Kuwait City

December 17
13:00

Yemen	47–85	Saudi Arabia

Fajhan Hilal Al-Mutairi Court, Kuwait City

December 18
11:00

Japan	91–83	Saudi Arabia
Scoring by quarter: 27–22, 19–27, 23–14, 22–20

Fajhan Hilal Al-Mutairi Court, Kuwait City

== Quarterfinal round ==
=== Group I ===
Team	Pld	W	L	PF	PA	PD	Pts	Tiebreaker
South Korea	3	2	1	308	267	+41	5	1–0
Qatar	3	2	1	248	249	−1	5	0–1
Chinese Taipei	3	1	2	242	266	−24	4	1–0
Saudi Arabia	3	1	2	213	229	−16	4	0–1

December 20
13:00

Chinese Taipei	74–85	Qatar

Fajhan Hilal Al-Mutairi Court, Kuwait City

December 20
15:00

South Korea	77–88	Saudi Arabia

Fajhan Hilal Al-Mutairi Court, Kuwait City

December 21
15:00

Saudi Arabia	64–78	Chinese Taipei

Fajhan Hilal Al-Mutairi Court, Kuwait City

December 21
17:00

Qatar	89–114	South Korea

Fajhan Hilal Al-Mutairi Court, Kuwait City

December 22
15:00

South Korea	117–90	Chinese Taipei

Fajhan Hilal Al-Mutairi Court, Kuwait City

December 22
19:00

Qatar	74–61	Saudi Arabia

Fajhan Hilal Al-Mutairi Court, Kuwait City

=== Group II ===
Team	Pld	W	L	PF	PA	PD	Pts	Tiebreaker
Iran	3	2	1	244	202	+42	5	1–1 / 1.040
China	3	2	1	266	211	+55	5	1–1 / 1.000
Japan	3	2	1	258	211	+47	5	1–1 / 0.964
Kuwait	3	0	3	152	296	−144	3	

December 20
17:00

China	109–54	Kuwait

Fajhan Hilal Al-Mutairi Court, Kuwait City

December 20
19:00

Japan	75–83	Iran
Scoring by quarter: 16–18, 16–14, 19–18, 24–33

Fajhan Hilal Al-Mutairi Court, Kuwait City

December 21
13:00

Iran	72–74	China

Fajhan Hilal Al-Mutairi Court, Kuwait City

December 21
19:00

Kuwait	45–98	Japan
Scoring by quarter: 11–26, 10–20, 11–21, 13–31

Fajhan Hilal Al-Mutairi Court, Kuwait City

December 22
13:00

China	83–85	Japan
Scoring by quarter: 20–22, 19–23, 24–25, 20–15

Fajhan Hilal Al-Mutairi Court, Kuwait City

December 22
17:00

Iran	89–53	Kuwait

Fajhan Hilal Al-Mutairi Court, Kuwait City

=== Group III ===
Team	Pld	W	L	PF	PA	PD	Pts
Lebanon	2	2	0	199	130	+69	4
Hong Kong	2	1	1	144	158	−14	3
Sri Lanka	2	0	2	126	181	−55	2

December 20
11:00

Lebanon	97–70	Sri Lanka

Fajhan Hilal Al-Mutairi Court, Kuwait City

December 21
9:00

Sri Lanka	56–84	Hong Kong

Fajhan Hilal Al-Mutairi Court, Kuwait City

December 22
11:00

Hong Kong	60–102	Lebanon

Fajhan Hilal Al-Mutairi Court, Kuwait City

=== Group IV ===
Team	Pld	W	L	PF	PA	PD	Pts
Malaysia	2	2	0	151	117	+34	4
Yemen	2	1	1	147	167	−20	3
India	2	0	2	151	165	−14	2

December 20
9:00

Malaysia	74–61	India

Fajhan Hilal Al-Mutairi Court, Kuwait City

December 21
11:00

India	90–91	Yemen

Fajhan Hilal Al-Mutairi Court, Kuwait City

December 22
9:00

Yemen	56–77	Malaysia

Fajhan Hilal Al-Mutairi Court, Kuwait City

== Classification 5th–14th ==
=== 13th place ===
December 25
13:00

Sri Lanka	76–94	India

Fajhan Hilal Al-Mutairi Court, Kuwait City

=== 11th place ===
December 25
15:00

Hong Kong	75–81	Yemen

Fajhan Hilal Al-Mutairi Court, Kuwait City

=== 9th place ===
December 24
15:00

Lebanon	64–48	Malaysia

Fajhan Hilal Al-Mutairi Court, Kuwait City

=== 7th place ===
December 25
17:00

Saudi Arabia	71–61	Kuwait

Fajhan Hilal Al-Mutairi Court, Kuwait City

=== 5th place ===
December 25
19:00

Chinese Taipei	68–76	Japan
Scoring by quarter: 25–18, 13–26, 17–14, 13–18

Fajhan Hilal Al-Mutairi Court, Kuwait City

== Final round ==
Semifinals
December 24
South Korea	90
China	102
December 24
Iran	49
Qatar	48

Final
December 26
China	81
Iran	70
3rd place
December 26
South Korea	105
Qatar	88

=== Semifinals ===
December 24
17:00

South Korea	90–102	China

Fajhan Hilal Al-Mutairi Court, Kuwait City

December 24
19:00

Iran	49–48	Qatar

Fajhan Hilal Al-Mutairi Court, Kuwait City

=== 3rd place ===
December 26
9:00

South Korea	105–88	Qatar

Fajhan Hilal Al-Mutairi Court, Kuwait City

=== Final ===
December 26
11:00

China	81–70	Iran

Fajhan Hilal Al-Mutairi Court, Kuwait City

== Final standing ==
Qualified for the 2003 FIBA Under-19 World Championship

Rank	Team	Record
1st place, gold medalist(s)	China	7–1
2nd place, silver medalist(s)	Iran	4–3
3rd place, bronze medalist(s)	South Korea	4–3
4	Qatar	4–4
5	Japan	5–1
6	Chinese Taipei	4–3
7	Saudi Arabia	3–3
8	Kuwait	2–5
9	Lebanon	4–1
10	Malaysia	3–3
11	Yemen	2–3
12	Hong Kong	2–4
13	India	1–5
14	Sri Lanka	0–6

== Awards ==
2002 Asian Under-18 champions

China
Seventh title
