= Saba Battery Tehran BC =

Saba Battery
- Leagues: Iranian Super League
- Founded: 2002
- History: Saba Battery Tehran; 2002 – 2008; Saba Mehr Tehran; 2008 – 2009; Saba Mehr Qazvin; 2009 – 2010
- Arena: Azadi Basketball Hall; Shahid Babaei Arena
- Location: Tehran / Qazvin, Iran
- Team colors: White and Blue
- Championships: (2) Asian Cup (1) West Asian Cup (3) Iranian Championships
- Website: www.sabamehr.org
Home	Away

Saba Battery Tehran Basketball Club also known as Saba Mehr Qazvin Basketball Club was an Iranian professional basketball club based in Tehran and Qazvin, Iran. They competed in the Iranian Basketball Super League.

The team was part of Saba Battery Club, owned by Saba Battery Co from 2002 to 2008. In 2008, Saba Battery Co. refused to hold the team anymore and club saved by a private company and changed its name to Saba Mehr. In April 2009, the club transferred from Tehran to Qazvin.

== Tournament records ==
=== Iranian Super League ===
- 2003–04: Champions
- 2004–05: 2nd place
- 2005–06: Champions
- 2006–07: Champions
- 2007–08: 2nd place
- 2008–09: 3rd place
- 2009–10: 4th place

=== WABA Champions Cup ===
- 2005: 2nd place
- 2006: 2nd place
- 2007: Champions
- 2008: 2nd place
- 2009: 3rd place

=== Asia Champions Cup ===
- 2005: 4th place
- 2006: 5th place
- 2007: Champions
- 2008: Champions

== Coaches ==
- (Iran) Mehran Shahintab (2002–2010)

== Notable former players ==
- (Dominica) Garth Joseph
- (Iran) Hamed Afagh
- (Iran) Hamed Haddadi
- (Iran) Mohammad Hassanzadeh
- (Iran) Mehdi Kamrani
- (Iran) Asghar Kardoust
- (Iran) Aidin Nikkhah Bahrami
- (Iran) Samad Nikkhah Bahrami
- (Iran) Hamed Sohrabnejad
- (Iran) Saman Veisi
- (France) Makan Dioumassi
- (Nigeria) Gabe Muoneke
- (Nigeria) Jeff Varem
- (United States) Priest Lauderdale
- (United States) Omar Sneed
- (United States) Jackson Vroman
- (Uruguay) Leandro García

== Squads ==
- FIBA Asia Champions Cup 2007
  - Behnam Afradi, Babak Nezafat, Saman Veisi, Mohammad Sistani, Hamed Afagh, Aidin Nikkhah Bahrami, Gabe Muoneke, Garth Joseph, Asghar Kardoust, Karam Ahmadian, Samad Nikkhah Bahrami, Behzad Afradi. Coach: Mehran Shahintab
- FIBA Asia Champions Cup 2008
  - Mohammad Masoud Irani, Kamran Jamshidvand, Hamed Afagh, Mehdi Kamrani, Mohammad Sistani, DaJuan Tate, Gabe Muoneke, Asghar Kardoust, Karam Ahmadian, Saeid Tabeshnia, Hamed Haddadi, Samad Nikkhah Bahrami. Coach: Mehran Shahintab
