= Michele Serros =

American author, poet and comedic social commentator

Michele Marie Serros
- Born: February 10, 1966; Oxnard, California, U.S.
- Died: January 4, 2015 (aged 48); Berkeley, California, U.S.
- Occupations: Author, motivational speaker
- Writing career
- Pen name: medium brown girl, Mucha Michele, mira la michele
- Genres: Fiction, creative non-fiction, poetry, spoken word
- Website: www.miralamichele.com

Michele Marie Serros (February 10, 1966 – January 4, 2015) was an American author, poet and comedic social commentator. Hailed as "a Woman to Watch in the New Century" by Newsweek, She wrote several books and regularly contributed original commentaries to National Public Radio.

As a Latina writer drawing on her own life experiences, much of her works gave voice to the complexities of lives straddling two worlds: working-class Mexican-American heritage and southern California pop culture. She described how she never quite fit in through poems and prose that were both poignant and hilarious.

== Education and personal life ==
Born in Oxnard, California, Serros was the second daughter to George R. Serros (deceased 2016), a municipal court interpreter and Beatrice Ruiz Serros, a drafts person (deceased 1991). She has one sister, Yvonne, six years her senior. Growing up in the prominently Hispanic community of El Rio, a semi-rural, unincorporated community on the northeast edge of Oxnard, Serros was a latchkey child due to the arduous, burdensome work schedule endured by both parents. Upon returning to the community library for a book signing, she remarked, "This library was my home away from home when I was growing up" and considered herself a lifelong reader. She spent her free time watching TV game shows, digging holes in the backyard, and skateboarding.

When Michele was 11 years old, her parents separated. Feeling overwhelmed with fear and confusion she wrote to the only person she felt would understand, young-adult author Judy Blume. Blume wrote back suggesting that she keep a diary as an outlet for her emotions, thus inspiring a foundation for Serros' writing career.

Unlike the assertion made by many authors about their own time as a youth, Serros feels she wasn't a "nerdy, withdrawn teen" that ate lunch alone in the school yard. As a student at Rio Mesa High School, Serros had many friends and love interests who often ditched 5th period class to continue socializing. However, such social enthusiasm eventually led to her academic downfall and by the end of her sophomore year at Rio Mesa High School, her mother transferred her to Santa Clara High School, a private Catholic high school in Oxnard. Upon her 1984 graduation, Serros attended Ventura College for two years before transferring to Santa Monica City College. After an additional six years of sporadic study, she graduated cum laude from UCLA with a degree in Chicano Studies in 1996. She married musician Eugene Trautmann, a member of seminal rock bands Queens of the Stone Age and Eagles of Death Metal, and whom she had met 11 years earlier backstage at the Leave Your Mind at Home music festival in Antwerp, Belgium. Upon their separation and eventual divorce in 2001, Serros moved to the Washington Heights neighborhood of New York City. Since then, Michele continued to work diligently as a motivational speaker, was invited to deliver commencement speeches and attend book fairs all across the country. In the summer of 2010 Michele met restaurateur Antonio Magaña. After learning that they attended the same high school and were from the same city, Antonio asked Michele for a lunch date. They were engaged on Christmas night later that year and were married in the summer of 2011 in New York City on the rooftop of the judge's chambers. They made their home between California and New York.

She was diagnosed with adenoid cystic carcinoma of the salivary gland in 2013. The cancer had metastasized and while she endured chemotherapy, she died at the beginning of 2015.

== Professional life ==
While a student at Santa Monica City College, Serros's first book of poetry and short stories, Chicana Falsa and other stories of Death, Identity and Oxnard, was published in 1994. After Lalo Press, the original publisher ceased business, she continued to sell copies from her garage while maintaining a devoted following of fans as well as a place in academia where Chicana Falsa became required reading in many high schools and universities in Southern California.

With the success of Chicana Falsa, Serros was selected in 1994 as one of twelve poets to travel nationally with the touring music festival, Lollapalooza. In addition to reading her poetry in the festival's second stage arena, she inspired Billy Corgan of the Smashing Pumpkins to accompany her on bass guitar as she read, 'Mr. Boom Boom Man,' from Chicana Falsa. In November 1996, the spoken word label Mouth Almighty issued an audio version of Chicana Falsa.

In 1997, after learning of an extensive Life and Styles feature of Serros in The Los Angeles Times, Julie Grau (then an editor at Riverhead Books) phoned Serros to inquire about the rights to Chicana Falsa. The following year, Riverhead Books (Penguin/Putnam) reissued Chicana Falsa as well as published a book of short stories, Los Angeles Times Best Seller, How to be a Chicana Role Model in 2000.

At Europe, the Spanish songwriter Gabriel Sopeña used her poem Mi problema and made a version in Spanish, which in the shape of a song was sung by the Cuban artist Ludmila Mercerón, and appeared in 1999 on the album: Orillas: 13 poemas de mujeres hispanas.

In early 2001, Serros' work caught the attention of Ann Lopez, wife of comedian George Lopez. Following an interview with George Lopez and Warner Brother Studios producers, Serros, who had yet to write a script or screenplay, was hired in 2002 to write for the ABC television sitcom, George Lopez. She has stated, "An opportunity that hopefully with my contribution opened the door for a wider representation of Latinos in the mass media".

During the 2003 summer, she saw the surfing documentary, Step into Liquid and was floored by the film's tanker surfing segment shot in Galveston, Texas. Upon returning home from the movie, she emailed one of the surfers featured in the film, award-winning filmmaker, James Fulbright, and asked for the opportunity to experience firsthand what she had seen in the movie. In 2004, Serros was invited to tanker surf with Fulbright and his crew in the Gulf of Mexico for a featured segment of The CBS Evening News.

In 2005, Serros was approached by Alloy Entertainment to create a "Latina version" of their hugely successful Gossip Girl Young Adult Book Series. In 2006, her first young adult novel, Honey Blonde Chica was published followed by its sequel, ¡Scandalosa! in 2007.

In an interview with the Ventura County Star, Flea of the Red Hot Chili Peppers, stated he picked up a copy of How to be a Chicana Role Model as reading material for a trip and "By the time I got to the end of the book, I was crying like a hypersensitive wimp. I love crying like a hypersensitive wimp, so I looked (her up) on the Internet. We ended up becoming friends. I love California and Michele's writing is uniquely Californian-like Raymond Chandler or John Fante". In addition, alternative rock band, Rage Against the Machine, features a photograph of Serros' first book of poetry, Chicana Falsa, on the fold-out sleeve of their 1996 Grammy Award-winning album, Evil Empire.

== Published works ==
In addition to her books, Serros has written for the Los Angeles Times, Ms. Magazine, CosmoGirl, and The Washington Post and contributed satirical commentaries for National Public Radio (Latino USA, Morning Edition, Weekend All Things Considered, Anthem, Along for the Ride, and The California Report).

She recorded Selected Stories from Chicana Falsa for Mouth Almighty Records, (1997) and was selected by The Getty Research Institute and Poetry Society of America to have her poetry placed on MTA buses throughout Los Angeles County.

- Chicana Falsa and Other Stories of Death, Identity, and Oxnard Lalo Press 1994
- Chicana Falsa and Other Stories of Death, Identity, and Oxnard (reissue) 1998 Riverhead Books 1996 ISBN 1-57322-685-8
- How to be a Chicana Role Model Riverhead Books, 2000 ISBN 9781573228244
- Honey Blonde Chica (SimonPulse/Simon and Schuster) 2005 ISBN 978-1-4169-1591-1
- ¡Scandalosa! (SimonPulse) 2007 ISBN 978-1-4169-1593-5

== Public appearance and lectures ==
Serros was a national speaker to schools, universities and organizations. In 2002, she served as the commencement speaker for Stanford University's La Raza graduation. The same year, Serros was chosen by PEN Center USA to write and perform an original piece honoring John Steinbeck to commemorate the Twentieth Century Masters Tribute where she shared the Lincoln Center for the Performing Arts' stage with literary luminaries as Arthur Miller, William Kennedy, Dorothy Allison, Studs Terkel, Peter Matthiessen and George Plimpton.
