= Jean Abdelnour =

Lebanese basketball player (born 1983)

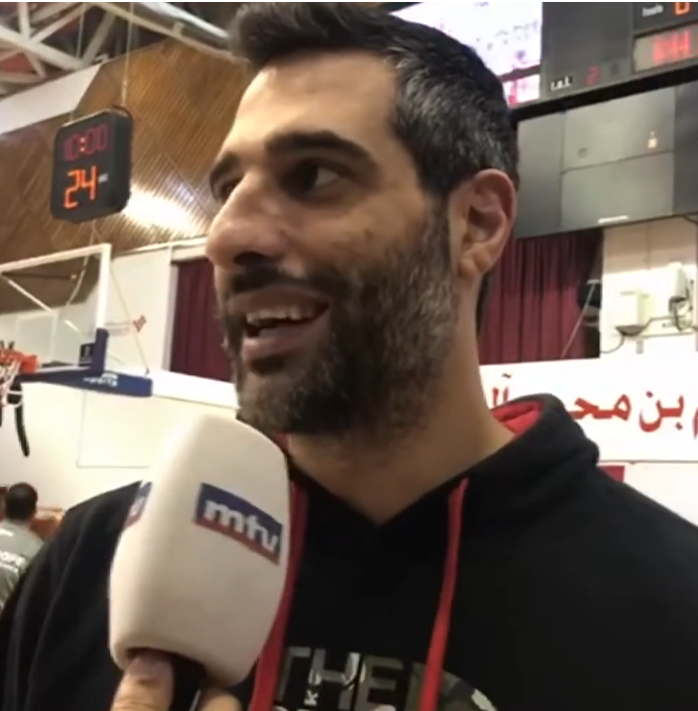

Personal information
- Born: November 29, 1983 (age 42) Beirut, Lebanon
- Listed height: 197 cm (6 ft 6 in)
- Listed weight: 224 lb (102 kg)

Career information
- Playing career: 2003–2023
- Position: Small forward

Career history
- 2003–2009: Blue Stars
- 2009–2023: Al Riyadi

Career highlights
- No. 4 retired by Al Riyadi
Medals
Men's basketball
Representing Lebanon
FIBA Asia Championship
Silver medal – second place	2007 Tokushima	Team

Jean Abdelnour (Arabic: جان عبد النور, born 29 November 1983) is a Lebanese former basketball player. He had a successful 2002–03 season with Ghazir which led him to be signed by the Bluestars for the 2003–04 season. He stayed with the Bluestars until the 2008–09 season where he was the leading Lebanese scorer on the team averaging 16 ppg and 7.4 rpg. After the season finished Bluestars dropped from the first division, and Abdelnour subsequently signed a 4-year contract with Sporting Al Riyadi Beirut. Abdel-Nour is also a member of the Lebanon national basketball team, with whom he competed at the 2006 FIBA World Championship.

== Awards and achievements ==
- Lebanese Basketball League Champion 2010,2013, 2014, 2015, 2016,2017,2019,2021,2023
- FIBA Asia Champions Cup 2011, 2017
