= Srđan Jovanović =

Serbian basketball coach and player

Parsa Mashhad
- Title: Head coach
- League: Iranian Basketball Super League

Personal information
- Born: 1 March 1976 (age 50) Belgrade, SR Serbia, SFR Yugoslavia
- Listed height: 1.95 m (6 ft 5 in)
- Listed weight: 88 kg (194 lb)

Career information
- NBA draft: 1998: undrafted
- Playing career: 1992–2010
- Position: Point guard / shooting guard
- Number: 14, 7, 13, 4
- Coaching career: 2012–present

Career history

Playing
- 1992–1993: Crvena zvezda
- 1993–1997: Aris BSA Thessaloniki
- 1997–1999: Stefanel Milano
- 1999–2000: Telit Trieste
- 2000–2001: Poliform Cantù
- 2001–2002: Crvena zvezda
- 2002–2003: Esse.Ti Imola
- 2004–2005: Atlas
- 2005–2006: Kecskeméti KTE
- 2006: Makedonikos
- 2006–2007: Kotwica Kołobrzeg
- 2007: Świecie
- 2008: PVSK Panthers
- 2008–2009: Shahrekord
- 2010: Xanthi

Coaching
- 2012–2013: Timișoara (assistant)
- 2019–present: Parsa Mashhad

Srđan Jovanović (Serbian Cyrillic: Срђан Јовановић; born 1 March 1976) is a Serbian-Greek professional basketball coach and former player, who is the current head coach for Avijeh Sanat Parsa Mashhad of the Iranian Basketball Super League. He holds Greek citizenship, under the name of Srtzan Karageorgiou (Greek: Σέρτζιαν Καραγεωργίου).

== Playing career ==
Jovanović had two stints with the Crvena zvezda of the Yugoslav League. In the 1992–93 season, he won the Yugoslav League with Crvena zvezda and played together with Dragoljub Vidačić, Nebojša Ilić, Saša Obradović, Mileta Lisica, Predrag Stojaković, Rastko Cvetković, Aleksandar Trifunović and Dejan Tomašević. Later, he also played the 2001–02 season for the Zvezda. During the 2004–05 season, he played for his hometown team Atlas of the First League of Serbia & Montenegro.

In Italy, Jovanović played for the Stefanel Milano, the Telit Trieste and the Poliform Cantù of the Lega Serie A and for the Esse.Ti Imola of the Serie A2.

In Greece, Jovanović played for the Aris BSA Thessaloniki, the Makedonikos of the Greek League and for the Xanthi of the Greek A2 League.

In later stage of his career Jovanović played in Hungary (Kecskeméti KTE and PVSK Panthers), Poland (Kotwica Kołobrzeg and Świecie) and Iran (Shahrekord). He retired as a player with Xanthi in 2010.

== Coaching career ==
In 2019, Jovanović was hired as the head coach for Avijeh Sanat Parsa Mashhad of the Iranian Basketball Super League.

== Career achievements and awards ==
- Yugoslav League champion: 1 (with Crvena zvezda: 1992–93)
