= Brian Beshara =

Lebanese basketball player (born 1977)

Personal information
- Born: 30 December 1977 (age 48) Dallas, Texas, U.S.
- Listed height: 6 ft 8 in (2.03 m)
- Listed weight: 209 lb (95 kg)

Career information
- High school: Highland Park (University Park, Texas)
- College: Rice (1996–1997); LSU (1998–2001)
- NBA draft: 2001: undrafted
- Playing career: 2001–2010
- Position: Forward

Career history
- 2001–2004: Hekmeh BC
- 2004–2005: Blue Stars
- 2005–2006: Champville SC
- 2006–2007: Sporting Al Riyadi Beirut
- 2007–2008: Al Mouttahed
- 2008–2009: Hekmeh BC
- 2009: Sporting Al Riyadi Beirut
- 2009–2010: Hekmeh BC
Medals
Men's basketball
Representing Lebanon
FIBA Asia Championship
Silver medal – second place	2005 Doha	Team
Silver medal – second place	2007 Tokushima	Team

Brian Anthony Beshara (Feghali) (born 30 December 1977) is a former Lebanese basketball player. Beshara was also a member of the Lebanese national basketball team. At 6'8", he was Lebanon's starting forward and played an important role on both the offensive and defensive sides. His former LSU coach John Brady describes him as follows:"Brian Beshara is a good basketball player. He's tough. He's competitive. He believes in what he's doing."

== College and Club Basketball ==
After graduating from Highland Park High School in Dallas, Texas, Beshara played college basketball first for one year at Rice and then three years with the LSU Tigers.

In 2001, he joined Lebanese Champions and Arab and Asian Club Champions Sagesse Beirut (Hekmeh), where he teamed up with local stars such as Fadi El Khatib and Elie Mechantaf and played under National Coach Ghassan Sarkis.

Following a two-year spell at Hekmeh BC (also known as Sagesse), Beshara left for the recently formed Lebanese club, Blue Stars, where he played for a couple of years during which he was limited with various injuries. After Blue Stars, Beshara rejoined his former coach, Sarkis, for the 2005/2006 season, with his new team, Champville SC.

Following a disagreement with the club's management, Beshara left Champville and found himself without a team for the 2006/2007 season, as Champville refused to free him from his contract and let him join league champions Sporting Al Riyadi Beirut. Later on, he played for a short period in Al Mouttahed, then spent some time between Hekmeh BC and Sporting Al Riyadi Beirut.

== National Team Basketball ==
Beshara played for Lebanese national basketball team. He played part in the qualification to the 2006 FIBA world championship in Japan.

Below are some statistics for his performance with the national team.

Competition	PPG	RPG	APG
FIBA Asia Championship for Men 2007	8.1	5.4	0.3
FIBA World Championship 2006	9.8	4.6	2

One of the highest achievements realized by the Lebanese national basketball team was their 74–73 victory over the French national basketball team on August 23, 2006 during the 2006 World Championship in Sendai, Japan. In the game, Beshara scored 11 points and led the team with 8 rebounds.
