= 2009 WABA Champions Cup =

The WABA Champions Cup 2009 was the 12th staging of the WABA Champions Cup, the basketball club tournament of West Asia Basketball Association. The tournament was held in Amman, Jordan between March 13 and March 21. The top three teams from different countries qualify for the 2009 FIBA Asia Champions Cup.

== Preliminary round ==
=== Group A ===
Team	Pld	W	L	PF	PA	PD	Pts
(Iran) Mahram Tehran	3	3	0	277	215	+62	6
(Lebanon) Al-Mouttahed Tripoli	3	2	1	268	196	+72	5
(Jordan) Orthodox	3	1	2	211	234	−23	4
(Yemen) Al-Ahli	3	0	3	171	282	−111	3

March 13
14:00

Mahram Tehran (Iran)	94–87	(Lebanon) Al-Mouttahed Tripoli
Scoring by quarter: 21–21, 19–21, 30–19, 24–26

Prince Hamzah Court, Amman

March 13
20:00

Al-Ahli (Yemen)	64–88	(Jordan) Orthodox
Scoring by quarter: 16–24, 16–23, 20–21, 12–20

Prince Hamzah Court, Amman

March 14
15:00

Al-Mouttahed Tripoli (Lebanon)	94–43	(Yemen) Al-Ahli
Scoring by quarter: 29–11, 29–16, 18–9, 18–7

Prince Hamzah Court, Amman

March 15
19:00

Al-Ahli (Yemen)	64–100	(Iran) Mahram Tehran
Scoring by quarter: 9–13, 18–30, 16–26, 21–31

Prince Hamzah Court, Amman

March 16
17:00

Al-Mouttahed Tripoli (Lebanon)	87–59	(Jordan) Orthodox
Scoring by quarter: 21–14, 22–15, 25–8, 19–22

Prince Hamzah Court, Amman

March 17
17:00

Orthodox (Jordan)	64–83	(Iran) Mahram Tehran
Scoring by quarter: 12–21, 19–26, 16–18, 17–18

Prince Hamzah Court, Amman

=== Group B ===
Team	Pld	W	L	PF	PA	PD	Pts	Tiebreaker
(Jordan) Zain	4	3	1	363	320	+43	7	1–1 / 1.024
(Lebanon) Al-Riyadi Beirut	4	3	1	402	322	+80	7	1–1 / 1.016
(Iran) Saba Mehr Tehran	4	3	1	350	298	+52	7	1–1 / 0.960
(Iraq) Al-Karkh	4	1	3	301	393	−92	5	
(Syria) Al-Jaish	4	0	4	291	374	−83	4	

March 13
16:00

Saba Mehr Tehran (Iran)	88–97	(Lebanon) Al-Riyadi Beirut
Scoring by quarter: 15–30, 20–21, 15–16, 38–30

Prince Hamzah Court, Amman

March 13
18:00

Al-Karkh (Iraq)	80–104	(Jordan) Zain
Scoring by quarter: 18–28, 17–25, 20–34, 25–17

Prince Hamzah Court, Amman

March 14
13:00

Al-Riyadi Beirut (Lebanon)	115–68	(Iraq) Al-Karkh
Scoring by quarter: 24–26, 6–30, 15–32, 23–27

Prince Hamzah Court, Amman

March 14
19:00

Al-Jaish (Syria)	74–89	(Jordan) Zain
Scoring by quarter: 16–19, 19–18, 20–26, 19–26

Prince Hamzah Court, Amman

March 15
15:00

Al-Karkh (Iraq)	56–98	(Iran) Saba Mehr Tehran
Scoring by quarter: 14–26, 15–23, 13–22, 14–27

Prince Hamzah Court, Amman

March 15
17:00

Al-Riyadi Beirut (Lebanon)	102–72	(Syria) Al-Jaish
Scoring by quarter: 25–12, 28–17, 25–23, 24–20

Prince Hamzah Court, Amman

March 16
15:00

Saba Mehr Tehran (Iran)	86–69	(Syria) Al-Jaish
Scoring by quarter: 25–11, 17–24, 24–17, 20–17

Prince Hamzah Court, Amman

March 16
19:00

Zain (Jordan)	94–88 (OT)	(Lebanon) Al-Riyadi Beirut
Scoring by quarter: 18–19, 17–24, 23–24, 23–14, Overtime: 13–7

Prince Hamzah Court, Amman

March 17
15:00

Al-Jaish (Syria)	76–97	(Iraq) Al-Karkh
Scoring by quarter: 24–30, 14–25, 18–21, 20–21

Prince Hamzah Court, Amman

March 17
19:00

Zain (Jordan)	76–78	(Iran) Saba Mehr Tehran
Scoring by quarter: 16–16, 20–22, 17–16, 23–24

Prince Hamzah Court, Amman

== Final round ==
Quarterfinals
March 18
(Iran) Mahram	112
(Iraq) Al-Karkh	83
March 18
(Lebanon) Al-Riyadi	96
(Jordan) Orthodox	80
March 18
(Jordan) Zain	81
(Yemen) Al-Ahli	35
March 18
(Lebanon) Al-Mouttahed	76
(Iran) Saba Mehr	82

Semifinals
March 20
(Iran) Mahram	69
(Lebanon) Al-Riyadi	56
March 20
(Jordan) Zain	83
(Iran) Saba Mehr	75

Final
March 21
(Iran) Mahram	96
(Jordan) Zain	85
3rd place
March 21
(Lebanon) Al-Riyadi	88
(Iran) Saba Mehr	91

Semifinals
March 20
(Iraq) Al-Karkh	80
(Jordan) Orthodox	93
March 20
(Yemen) Al-Ahli	68
(Lebanon) Al-Mouttahed	110

5th place
March 21
(Jordan) Orthodox	88
(Lebanon) Al-Mouttahed	90
7th place
March 21
(Iraq) Al-Karkh	85
(Yemen) Al-Ahli	56

=== Quarterfinals ===
March 18
13:00

Mahram Tehran (Iran)	112–83	(Iraq) Al-Karkh
Scoring by quarter: 21–21, 44–26, 30–19, 17–17

Prince Hamzah Court, Amman

March 18
15:00

Al-Mouttahed Tripoli (Lebanon)	76–82	(Iran) Saba Mehr Tehran
Scoring by quarter: 12–20, 14–12, 26–27, 24–23

Prince Hamzah Court, Amman

March 18
17:00

Al-Riyadi Beirut (Lebanon)	96–80	(Jordan) Orthodox
Scoring by quarter: 26–11, 21–19, 22–29, 27–21

Prince Hamzah Court, Amman

March 18
19:00

Zain (Jordan)	81–35	(Yemen) Al-Ahli
Scoring by quarter: 23–14, 17–3, 18–7, 23–11

Prince Hamzah Court, Amman

=== Semifinals 5th–8th ===
March 20
14:00

Al-Ahli (Yemen)	68–110	(Lebanon) Al-Mouttahed Tripoli
Scoring by quarter: 24–24, 16–33, 14–33, 14–20

Prince Hamzah Court, Amman

March 20
16:00

Al-Karkh (Iraq)	80–93	(Jordan) Orthodox
Scoring by quarter: 19–25, 18–27, 21–16, 22–25

Prince Hamzah Court, Amman

=== Semifinals ===
March 20
18:00

Mahram Tehran (Iran)	69–56	(Lebanon) Al-Riyadi Beirut
Scoring by quarter: 22–10, 16–20, 20–12, 11–14
Pts: Sohrabnejad 20		Pts: Ahmed 19

Prince Hamzah Court, Amman

March 20
20:00

Zain (Jordan)	83–75	(Iran) Saba Mehr Tehran
Scoring by quarter: 15–21, 17–18, 28–28, 23–8
Pts: Soobzokov 21		Pts: Vroman 32

Prince Hamzah Court, Amman

=== 7th place ===
March 21
10:00

Al-Karkh (Iraq)	85–56	(Yemen) Al-Ahli
Scoring by quarter: 24–17, 15–12, 26–14, 20–13

Prince Hamzah Court, Amman

=== 5th place ===
March 21
16:00

Orthodox (Jordan)	88–90	(Lebanon) Al-Mouttahed Tripoli
Scoring by quarter: 20–23, 21–32, 19–16, 28–19

Prince Hamzah Court, Amman

=== 3rd place ===
March 21
12:00

Al-Riyadi Beirut (Lebanon)	88–91	(Iran) Saba Mehr Tehran
Scoring by quarter: 19–25, 26–24, 23–20, 20–22
Pts: Riley 24		Pts: Varem 20

Prince Hamzah Court, Amman

=== Final ===
March 21
18:00

Mahram Tehran (Iran)	96–85	(Jordan) Zain
Scoring by quarter: 32–16, 20–26, 20–28, 24–15
Pts: Lauderdale 33		Pts: Lett 23

Prince Hamzah Court, Amman

== Final standing ==
Rank	Team	Record
1st place, gold medalist(s)	(Iran) Mahram Tehran	6–0
2nd place, silver medalist(s)	(Jordan) Zain	5–2
3rd place, bronze medalist(s)	(Iran) Saba Mehr Tehran	5–2
4	(Lebanon) Al-Riyadi Beirut	4–3
5	(Lebanon) Al-Mouttahed Tripoli	4–2
6	(Jordan) Orthodox	2–4
7	(Iraq) Al-Karkh	2–5
8	(Yemen) Al-Ahli	0–6
9	(Syria) Al-Jaish	0–4
