= Esteghlal Tehran BC =

- Nickname: Taj (The Crown); Esteghlal; The Blues
- Leagues: Iranian Basketball Super League
- Founded: 1947
- Dissolved: 1979
- History: Taj (1947–1979); Esteghlal (2025–present)
- Arena: Azadi Basketball Hall
- Capacity: 3,000
- Location: Tehran, Iran
- Team colors: Blue, white
- President: Ali Tajernia (acting)
- Head coach: Mehran Shahintab
- Team captain: Arsalan Kazemi
- Ownership: Persian Gulf Petrochemical Industries
- Website: fcesteghlal.ir
Home	Away

Esteghlal Tehran Basketball Club (Persian: باشگاه بسکتبال استقلال تهران), commonly known as Esteghlal, is a professional basketball club based in Tehran, Iran. It is the men's basketball section of the multi-sport club Esteghlal F.C. and currently competes in the Iranian Basketball Super League.

The club was originally established in 1947 under the name Taj as part of the Taj Sports and Cultural Organization. During the pre-revolution era, Taj was regarded as one of the pioneers of Iranian basketball, winning multiple Tehran Clubs Championship titles and the Iranian Club Championship while producing numerous players for the Iran men's national basketball team. Following the Iranian Revolution in 1979, the basketball section was dissolved and remained inactive for almost five decades.

In August 2025, Esteghlal officially re-established both its men's and women's basketball teams, marking the club's return to professional basketball after a 47-year absence. Former Iran national team head coach Mehran Shahintab was appointed as head coach, while national team captain Arsalan Kazemi became one of the club's first marquee signings of the modern era. The club also strengthened its roster with several experienced Iranian internationals and former NBA player Isaiah Whitehead ahead of its return to the Iranian Basketball Super League.

== History ==
=== Foundation and early years ===
Taj Basketball Club was founded in 1947 as part of the Taj Sports and Cultural Organization. Prior to this, the parent club had been established in 1945 under the name Docharkheh Savaran (Cyclists), with basketball being one of its original sporting disciplines.

The club won its first official title in the Tehran Basketball Championship in 1950. Taj went on to dominate the competition, winning additional championships in 1951, 1952, 1953, 1956, and 1957–58, a period widely regarded as the club's first golden era.

At the national level, Taj also achieved considerable success. In the final of the 1959 Iranian Club Championship, Taj defeated Bustan Varzesh (Army) 46–42 in a notable match played under floodlights to claim the national title. The club also participated in international exhibition matches; in 1957, Taj faced the Soviet Army basketball team during its tour of Iran.

=== Notable coaches and players ===
During the club's most successful period, Gholam Vaezi served as the team's head coach. Among the club's most prominent players was Mahmoud Mashhoun, who captained Taj and, alongside his brothers Kamal Mashhoun and Reza Mashhoun, represented the Iran men's national basketball team for many years. Other notable products of the club's youth system included Hassan Mirza Aghabig and Bahman Farzaneh, both of whom later became Iranian internationals.

=== Renaming and dissolution after the 1979 Revolution ===
Following the Iranian Revolution in 1979, the Taj Sports and Cultural Organization was renamed Esteghlal, and the basketball section adopted the new name accordingly. Enayatollah Atashi played a significant role in preventing the complete dissolution of the club after the revolution. Despite the continuation of some sporting sections under the Esteghlal name, the men's basketball team was dissolved and remained inactive for decades. Throughout the 1980s, 1990s, 2000s, and 2010s, the club had no official men's basketball activities, as Esteghlal primarily focused on its football operations.

=== Re-establishment ===
After an absence of approximately 47 years, Esteghlal's board of directors approved the re-establishment of both the men's and women's basketball teams in August 2025. The club returned to professional basketball by appointing Mehran Shahintab as head coach and signing several Iranian national team players. Club officials Ali Tajernia and Farideh Shojaei have been credited as the principal figures behind the revival of Esteghlal's basketball section.

== Honours ==
=== National competitions ===
Iranian Club Championship

- Champions (1): 1959

Tehran Clubs Championship

- Champions (6): 1950, 1951, 1952, 1953, 1956, 1957

=== Other honours ===
Iranian Basketball Super League qualification tournament

- Champions (1): 2025

== Players ==
=== Current roster ===
Note: Flags indicate national team eligibility at FIBA-sanctioned events. Players may hold other non-FIBA nationalities not displayed.

Esteghlal Tehran roster
Players
Coaches

Pos.	No.	Nat.	Name	Ht.
SF	4	(Iran)	Alireza Sharifi	2.03 m (6 ft 8 in)
SG	5	(Iran)	Ashkan Jafari	1.94 m (6 ft 4 in)
G	6	(Iran)	Arman Mohabbi	1.89 m (6 ft 2 in)
G	7	(Iran)	Navid Rezaeifar	1.94 m (6 ft 4 in)
F	8	(Iran)	Amir Niknam	1.97 m (6 ft 6 in)
PG	11	(Iran)	Mohammadmehdi Heydari	1.96 m (6 ft 5 in)
SF	13	(Iran)	Navid Khajehzadeh	1.95 m (6 ft 5 in)
PF	14	(Iran)	Arsalan Kazemi (C)	2.01 m (6 ft 7 in)
C	23	(Iran)	Hassan Aliakbari	2.18 m (7 ft 2 in)
SF	32	(Iran)	Mohammadmehdi Rahimi	2.02 m (6 ft 8 in)
G	44	(Iran)	Amirmohammad Habibi	1.90 m (6 ft 3 in)
PG	55	(Iran)	Mehdi Jafari	1.87 m (6 ft 2 in)

Head coach

- (Iran) Mehran Shahintab

Legend

- (C) Team captain
- Injured
