= 2006–07 Iranian Basketball Super League =

The following is the final results of the Iran Super League 2006/07 basketball season.

== Regular season ==
=== Group A ===
Rank	Team	P	W	L	Pts
1	Mahram Tehran	12	11	1	23
2	Zob Ahan Isfahan	12	9	3	21
3	Saba Battery Tehran	12	9	3	21
4	Heyat Basketball Gorgan	12	7	5	19
5	Payam Zanjan	12	3	9	15
6	Naft Tehran	12	1	11	13
7	Pegah Shiraz	12	2	10	12

=== Group B ===
Rank	Team	P	W	L	Pts
1	Petrochimi Bandar Imam	12	11	1	23
2	Paykan Tehran	12	10	2	22
3	Tarbiat Badani Kerman	12	6	6	18
4	Azad University Tehran	12	6	6	18
5	Setareh Benz Karaj	12	3	9	15
6	Gol Gohar Sirjan	12	3	9	15
7	Heyat Basketball Shahrekord	12	3	9	15

== Playoffs ==
=== Championship ===
Round of 16
Mahram
Bye
Payam Zanjan	149
Azad University	135
Saba Battery	193
Gol Gohar	140
Pegah Shiraz
Paykan	w/o
Zob Ahan	203
HB Shahrekord	172
Naft	126
TB Kerman	116
HB Gorgan	163
Setareh Benz	153
Bye
Petrochimi

Quarter-finals
Mahram	183
Payam Zanjan	147
Saba Battery	154
Paykan	135
Zob Ahan	157
Naft	146
HB Gorgan	141
Petrochimi	163

Semi-finals
Mahram	0
Saba Battery	2
Zob Ahan	1
Petrochimi	2

Final
Saba Battery	2
Petrochimi	0
Third place
Mahram	2
Zob Ahan	0

==== 1st round ====
Team 1	Agg.	Team 2	1st	2nd
Payam Zanjan	149 - 135	Azad University	87 - 83	62 - 52
Saba Battery	193 - 140	Gol Gohar	103 - 81	90 - 59
Pegah Shiraz	w/o	Paykan		
Zob Ahan	203 - 172	HB Shahrekord	103 - 97	100 - 75
Naft	126 - 116	TB Kerman	58 - 53	68 - 63
HB Gorgan	163 - 153	Setareh Benz	89 - 78	74 - 75

==== Quarterfinals ====
Team 1	Agg.	Team 2	1st	2nd
Mahram	183 - 147	Payam Zanjan	104 - 88	79 - 59
Saba Battery	154 - 135	Paykan	82 - 68	72 - 67
Zob Ahan	157 - 146	Naft	67 - 59	90 - 87
HB Gorgan	141 - 163	Petrochimi	74 - 83	67 - 80

==== Semifinals ====
Team 1	Series	Team 2	1st	2nd	3rd
Mahram	0 - 2	Saba Battery	83 - 88	73 - 83	
Zob Ahan	1 - 2	Petrochimi	92 - 86	76 - 91	70 - 97

==== 3rd place match ====
Team 1	Series	Team 2	1st	2nd	3rd
Mahram	2 - 0	Zob Ahan	83 - 81	73 - 71	

==== Final ====
Team 1	Series	Team 2	1st	2nd	3rd
Saba Battery	2 - 0	Petrochimi	103 - 100	73 - 72	

=== Classifications ===
==== 5th-8th places ====
Semi-finals
Payam Zanjan	136
Paykan	156
Naft	149
HB Gorgan	156

Fifth place
Paykan	151
HB Gorgan	161
Seventh place
Payam Zanjan	68
Naft	64

5th-8th

Team 1	Agg.	Team 2	1st	2nd
Payam Zanjan	136 - 156	Paykan	63 - 73	73 - 83
Naft	149 - 156	HB Gorgan	76 - 78	73 - 78

5th place match

Team 1	Agg.	Team 2	1st	2nd
Paykan	151 - 161	HB Gorgan	88 - 81	63 - 80

==== 9th-14th places ====
Quarter-finals
Azad University
Bye
Gol Gohar	w/o
Pegah Shiraz
HB Shahrekord	163
TB Kerman	158
Bye
Setareh Benz

Semi-finals
Azad University	140
Gol Gohar	164
HB Shahrekord	152
Setareh Benz	168

Ninth place
Gol Gohar	164
Setareh Benz	146
Eleventh place
Azad University	165
HB Shahrekord	139

9th-14th

Team 1	Agg.	Team 2	1st	2nd
Gol Gohar	w/o	Pegah Shiraz		
HB Shahrekord	163 - 158	TB Kerman	83 - 67	80 - 91

9th-12th

Team 1	Agg.	Team 2	1st	2nd
Azad University	140 - 164	Gol Gohar	54 - 71	86 - 93
HB Shahrekord	152 - 168	Setareh Benz	82 - 84	70 - 84

11th place match

Team 1	Agg.	Team 2	1st	2nd
Azad University	165 - 139	HB Shahrekord	90 - 65	75 - 74

9th place match

Team 1	Agg.	Team 2	1st	2nd
Gol Gohar	164 - 146	Setareh Benz	75 - 60	89 - 86

== Final ranking ==
Rank	Team
1	Saba Battery Tehran
2	Petrochimi Bandar Imam
3	Mahram Tehran
4	Zob Ahan Isfahan
5	Heyat Basketball Gorgan
6	Paykan Tehran
7	Payam Zanjan
8	Naft Tehran
9	Gol Gohar Sirjan
10	Setareh Benz Karaj
11	Azad University Tehran
12	Heyat Basketball Shahrekord
13	Tarbiat Badani Kerman
	Pegah Shiraz

- Saba Battery and Petrochimi qualified to WABA Champions Cup 2008.
- TB Kerman and Pegah Shiraz relegated to Division 1.
