= Terrance Dotsy =

American football player (born 1981)

No. 84
- Positions: Offensive lineman, defensive lineman

Personal information
- Born: November 24, 1981 (age 44); Oxnard, California, U.S.
- Listed height: 6 ft 3 in (1.91 m)
- Listed weight: 310 lb (141 kg)

Career information
- High school: Santa Clara (Oxnard)
- College: California
- NFL draft: 2002: undrafted

Career history
- Quad City Steamwheelers (2004); Dallas Desperados (2004–2008)

Awards and highlights
- Second-team All-Arena (2007)

Career AFL statistics
- Total tackles: 14
- Fumble recoveries: 1
- Pass deflections: 3
- Receptions: 31
- Receiving touchdowns: 7
- Stats at ArenaFan.com

Terrance Dotsy (born November 24, 1981) is an American former professional football lineman who played four seasons with the Dallas Desperados of the Arena Football League (AFL). He first enrolled at Ventura College before transferring to the University of California, Berkeley. Dotsy was also a member of the Quad City Steamwheelers of the af2.

== Early life ==
Dotsy played high school football at Santa Clara High School in Oxnard, California. He was a three-year starter at both tight end and defensive end for the Saints. He also started three seasons as a pitcher and first baseman on the baseball team. Dotsy was a starter on Santa Clara's state championship basketball team in 1999. He was named Santa Clara High School Athlete of the Year for 1998-99.

== College career ==
Dotsy played his first season of college football as a tight end for the Ventura Pirates of Ventura College in 1999. He was the team's third-leading receiver and was also a big factor in a rushing attack that averaged over 200 yards a game. He was named the team's Freshman of the Year and earned honorable mention Western State Conference honors.

Dotsy transferred to play for the California Golden Bears of the University of California, Berkeley from 2000 to 2002. He missed the first two games of his freshman season in 2000 due to a hand injury. He played in eight games in 2000, recording one solo tackle and one forced fumble. Dotsy played in 11 games in 2001, catching 3 passes for 26 yards. Prior to the 2002 season, Dotsy switched positions from tight end to defensive end. He missed the entire 2002 season due to an MCL tear in his knee. He majored in social welfare at California.

== Professional career ==
Dotsy played for the Quad City Steamwheelers of the af2 in 2004. He joined the team eleven games into the season, recording 4.5 tackles, including one for a loss, one sack, four pressures, one forced fumble and one pass breakup. He added a ten-yard catch on offense.

Dotsy signed with the Dallas Desperados on October 18, 2004. He played for the Desperados from 2005 to 2008, earning second-team All-Arena honors in 2007.

Dotsy had a workout with the Dallas Cowboys in 2007.
