= 2008 FIBA Asia Champions Cup =

Official logo

The FIBA Asia Champions Cup 2008 was the 19th staging of the FIBA Asia Champions Cup, the basketball club tournament of FIBA Asia. The tournament was held in Kuwait City, Kuwait between May 8, 2008 and May 19. The tournament was scheduled to end on May 16 but the schedule changed due to the death of the former Emir of Kuwait Sheikh Saad Al-Abdullah Al-Salim Al-Sabah. The committee decided to call off the play-off matches to decide the 5–10 positions.

== Preliminary round ==
=== Group A ===
| Team | Pld | W | L | PF | PA | PD | Pts |
|---|---|---|---|---|---|---|---|
| (Lebanon) Al-Riyadi Beirut | 4 | 4 | 0 | 339 | 246 | +93 | 8 |
| (Qatar) Al-Rayyan | 4 | 3 | 1 | 350 | 289 | +61 | 7 |
| (Kazakhstan) BC Almaty | 4 | 2 | 2 | 267 | 298 | −31 | 6 |
| (Jordan) Zain | 4 | 1 | 3 | 316 | 297 | +19 | 5 |
| (Indonesia) Muba Hang Tuah | 4 | 0 | 4 | 200 | 342 | −142 | 4 |

May 8
17:00

| Al-Rayyan (Qatar) | 92–48 | (Indonesia) Hang Tuah |
Scoring by quarter: 27–15, 27–18, 23–4, 15–11

Fajhan Hilal Al-Mutairi Court, Kuwait City

May 8
21:00

| Al-Riyadi (Lebanon) | 100–52 | (Kazakhstan) BC Almaty |
Scoring by quarter: 21–7, 31–14, 27–7, 21–24

Fajhan Hilal Al-Mutairi Court, Kuwait City

May 9
15:00

| Zain (Jordan) | 85–90 (OT) | (Qatar) Al-Rayyan |
Scoring by quarter: 18–15, 22–18, 9–22, 26–20, Overtime: 10–15

Fajhan Hilal Al-Mutairi Court, Kuwait City

May 9
17:00

| Hang Tuah (Indonesia) | 44–79 | (Lebanon) Al-Riyadi |
Scoring by quarter: 6–26, 6–18, 9–14, 23–21

Fajhan Hilal Al-Mutairi Court, Kuwait City

May 10
15:00

| BC Almaty (Kazakhstan) | 71–49 | (Indonesia) Hang Tuah |
Scoring by quarter: 25–14, 5–9, 24–6, 17–20

Fajhan Hilal Al-Mutairi Court, Kuwait City

May 10
17:00

| Al-Riyadi (Lebanon) | 72–71 | (Jordan) Zain |
Scoring by quarter: 17–17, 26–19, 19–15, 10–20

Fajhan Hilal Al-Mutairi Court, Kuwait City

May 11
15:00

| Al-Rayyan (Qatar) | 79–88 | (Lebanon) Al-Riyadi |
Scoring by quarter: 20–20, 17–29, 23–16, 19–23

Fajhan Hilal Al-Mutairi Court, Kuwait City

May 11
17:00

| Zain (Jordan) | 60–76 | (Kazakhstan) BC Almaty |
Scoring by quarter: 15–24, 11–16, 13–16, 21–20

Fajhan Hilal Al-Mutairi Court, Kuwait City

May 12
15:00

| Hang Tuah (Indonesia) | 59–100 | (Jordan) Zain |
Scoring by quarter: 13–17, 10–30, 10–26, 26–27

Fajhan Hilal Al-Mutairi Court, Kuwait City

May 12
17:00

| BC Almaty (Kazakhstan) | 68–89 | (Qatar) Al-Rayyan |
Scoring by quarter: 15–32, 17–16, 14–23, 22–18

Fajhan Hilal Al-Mutairi Court, Kuwait City

=== Group B ===
| Team | Pld | W | L | PF | PA | PD | Pts |
|---|---|---|---|---|---|---|---|
| (United Arab Emirates) Al-Wasl | 4 | 4 | 0 | 417 | 352 | +65 | 8 |
| (Iran) Saba Battery Tehran | 4 | 3 | 1 | 424 | 320 | +104 | 7 |
| (Bahrain) Al-Muharraq | 4 | 2 | 2 | 348 | 335 | +13 | 6 |
| (Kuwait) Al-Qadsia | 4 | 1 | 3 | 327 | 293 | +34 | 5 |
| (India) ONGC Dehradun | 4 | 0 | 4 | 241 | 457 | −216 | 4 |

May 8
15:00

| ONGC (India) | 58–109 | (Bahrain) Al-Muharraq |
Scoring by quarter: 8–29, 13–28, 14–29, 23–23

Fajhan Hilal Al-Mutairi Court, Kuwait City

May 8
19:00

| Saba Battery (Iran) | 92–60 | (Kuwait) Al-Qadsia |
Scoring by quarter: 22–6, 24–22, 29–19, 17–13

Fajhan Hilal Al-Mutairi Court, Kuwait City

May 9
19:00

| Al-Qadsia (Kuwait) | 116–35 | (India) ONGC |
Scoring by quarter: 28–6, 23–10, 41–10, 24–9

Fajhan Hilal Al-Mutairi Court, Kuwait City

May 9
21:00

| Al-Wasl (United Arab Emirates) | 116–110 (2OT) | (Iran) Saba Battery |
Scoring by quarter: 27–19, 22–15, 24–23, 22–38, Overtime: 11–11, 10–4

Fajhan Hilal Al-Mutairi Court, Kuwait City

May 10
19:00

| ONGC (India) | 72–102 | (United Arab Emirates) Al-Wasl |
Scoring by quarter: 16–27, 20–22, 24–30, 12–23

Fajhan Hilal Al-Mutairi Court, Kuwait City

May 10
21:00

| Al-Muharraq (Bahrain) | 83–69 | (Kuwait) Al-Qadsia |
Scoring by quarter: 19–22, 16–15, 21–15, 27–17

Fajhan Hilal Al-Mutairi Court, Kuwait City

May 11
19:00

| Saba Battery (Iran) | 130–76 | (India) ONGC |
Scoring by quarter: 35–10, 28–28, 29–28, 38–10

Fajhan Hilal Al-Mutairi Court, Kuwait City

May 11
21:00

| Al-Wasl (United Arab Emirates) | 116–88 | (Bahrain) Al-Muharraq |
Scoring by quarter: 31–18, 25–26, 33–16, 27–28

Fajhan Hilal Al-Mutairi Court, Kuwait City

May 12
19:00

| Al-Qadsia (Kuwait) | 82–83 (OT) | (United Arab Emirates) Al-Wasl |
Scoring by quarter: 22–29, 16–17, 14–17, 24–13, Overtime: 6–7

Fajhan Hilal Al-Mutairi Court, Kuwait City

May 12
21:00

| Al-Muharraq (Bahrain) | 68–92 | (Iran) Saba Battery |
Scoring by quarter: 17–33, 11–25, 14–21, 26–13

Fajhan Hilal Al-Mutairi Court, Kuwait City

== Knockout round ==
Quarter-finals
May 16 – Kuwait City
(Kuwait) Al-Qadsia | 80
(Lebanon) Al-Riyadi | 91
May 16 – Kuwait City
(Kazakhstan) BC Almaty | 77
(Iran) Saba Battery | 88
May 16 – Kuwait City
(Bahrain) Al-Muharraq | 78
(Qatar) Al-Rayyan | 95
May 16 – Kuwait City
(Jordan) Zain | 75
(United Arab Emirates) Al-Wasl | 84

Semi-finals
May 18 – Kuwait City
(Lebanon) Al-Riyadi | 68
(Iran) Saba Battery | 70
May 18 – Kuwait City
(Qatar) Al-Rayyan | 81
(United Arab Emirates) Al-Wasl | 57

Final
May 19 – Kuwait City
(Iran) Saba Battery | 82
(Qatar) Al-Rayyan | 75
Third place
May 19 – Kuwait City
(Lebanon) Al-Riyadi | 82
(United Arab Emirates) Al-Wasl | 87

=== Quarterfinals ===
May 16
14:00

| Al-Muharraq (Bahrain) | 78–95 | (Qatar) Al-Rayyan |
Scoring by quarter: 17–23, 12–20, 22–26, 27–26

Fajhan Hilal Al-Mutairi Court, Kuwait City

May 16
16:00

| Zain (Jordan) | 75–84 | (United Arab Emirates) Al-Wasl |
Scoring by quarter: 22–17, 20–18, 16–24, 17–25

Fajhan Hilal Al-Mutairi Court, Kuwait City

May 16
18:00

| Al-Qadsia (Kuwait) | 80–91 | (Lebanon) Al-Riyadi |
Scoring by quarter: 19–22, 19–20, 16–24, 26–25

Fajhan Hilal Al-Mutairi Court, Kuwait City

May 16
20:00

| BC Almaty (Kazakhstan) | 77–88 | (Iran) Saba Battery |
Scoring by quarter: 14–25, 21–14, 25–27, 17–22

Fajhan Hilal Al-Mutairi Court, Kuwait City

=== Semifinals ===
May 18
19:00

Semis

| Al-Riyadi (Lebanon) | 68–70 | (Iran) Saba Battery |
Scoring by quarter: 25–22, 14–20, 15–9, 14–19

Fajhan Hilal Al-Mutairi Court, Kuwait City

May 18
21:00

Semis

| Al-Rayyan (Qatar) | 81–57 | (United Arab Emirates) Al-Wasl |
Scoring by quarter: 18–16, 29–9, 19–9, 15–23

Fajhan Hilal Al-Mutairi Court, Kuwait City

=== Finals ===
May 19
19:00

Bronze

| Al-Riyadi (Lebanon) | 82–87 | (United Arab Emirates) Al-Wasl |
Scoring by quarter: 29–20, 15–21, 19–24, 19–22

Fajhan Hilal Al-Mutairi Court, Kuwait City

May 19
21:00

Gold

| Saba Battery (Iran) | 82–75 | (Qatar) Al-Rayyan |
Scoring by quarter: 16–15, 13–24, 32–14, 21–22
| Pts: Tate 30 | | Pts: Chatfield 29 |

Fajhan Hilal Al-Mutairi Court, Kuwait City

== Final standings ==
| Rank | Team | Record |
|---|---|---|
| Gold medal | (Iran) Saba Battery Tehran | 6–1 |
| Silver medal | (Qatar) Al-Rayyan | 5–2 |
| Bronze medal | (United Arab Emirates) Al-Wasl | 6–1 |
| 4th | (Lebanon) Al-Riyadi Beirut | 5–2 |
Failed to Reach Semifinals
| | (Bahrain) Al-Muharraq | 2–3 |
| | (Kazakhstan) BC Almaty | 2–3 |
| | (Kuwait) Al-Qadsia | 1–4 |
| | (Jordan) Zain | 1–4 |
Failed to Reach Quarterfinals
| | (Indonesia) Muba Hang Tuah | 0–4 |
| | (India) ONGC Dehradun | 0–4 |

== Awards ==
- Most Valuable Player: (Nigeria) Gabe Muoneke (Saba Battery Tehran)
