= Makan Dioumassi =

French basketball player

Personal information
- Born: July 21, 1972 (age 54) Paris, France
- Listed height: 6 ft 3 in (1.91 m)

Career information
- Playing career: 1992–2008
- Position: Guard

Career history
- 1992–1993: Paris Basket Racing
- 1993–1994: Saint-Brieuc Basket
- 1994–1995: Tours Joué Basket
- 1995–1997: Montpellier Paillade Basket
- 1997–2000: Le Mans Sarthe
- 2000: Pallacanestro Trieste
- 2000–2001: Andrea Costa Imola
- 2001–2002: Caja San Fernando
- 2002–2003: Hyères-Toulon
- 2003–2006: ASVEL Villeurbanne
- 2006–2008: Saba Battery Tehran
Medals
Representing France
Men's basketball
Olympic Games
| Silver medal – second place | 2000 Sydney | Team competition |

Makan Dioumassi (born July 21, 1972 in Paris) is a basketball player from France, who won the silver medal at the 2000 Summer Olympics with the Men's National Team. Playing as a shooting guard he was on the national side that claimed the bronze medal at the 2005 European Championships.
