= Brunei Cup =

The Brunei Cup was an annual basketball tournament held at Brunei from 2001 until 2008. First held in 2001, with most of the teams coming from Overseas Filipino workers in Brunei, the tournament has since expanded to include several professional and national teams around Asia and Australia. The games were held at Brunei's National Indoor Stadium.

== Tournament results ==
| Year | Final | | | Third-place game |
| Year | Winner | Score | Runner-up | 3rd Place | Score | 4th Place |
| 2001 | (Brunei) Mum Bakery | 00-00 | (Brunei) unknown | (Brunei) unknown | 00-00 | (Brunei) unknown |
| 2002 | (Brunei) Suncity Dragons | 00-00 | (Brunei) unknown | (Brunei) unknown | 00-00 | (Brunei) unknown |
| 2003 | (Brunei) Goh Brothers Goldsmiths | 79-77 | (Brunei) Suncity Dragons | (Brunei) SYH Tigers | 141-107 | (Brunei) CESK L. Mark Lakers |
| 2004 | TG South Korea | 00-00 | (Brunei) unknown | (Brunei) unknown | 00-00 | (Brunei) unknown |
| 2005 | (Philippines) San Miguel | 70-67 | (Philippines) Alaska Aces | (South Korea) Seoul SK Knights | 95-82 | (Japan) Toshiba Brave Thunders |
| 2006 | (Philippines) San Miguel | 96-65 | (Australia) Darwin All-Stars | (South Korea) Seoul SK Knights | 102-63 | Saudi Arabia All-Stars |
| 2007 | (South Korea) Changwon LG Sakers | 76-62 | (Philippines) Sta. Lucia Realtors | Singapore Slingers | 106-63 | (Australia) Darwin All-Stars |
| 2008 | Singapore Slingers | 86-75 | (South Korea) Changwon LG Sakers | (Australia) Darwin All-Stars | 88-45 | Jordan All-Stars |
