= 2005 FIBA Asia Champions Cup =

16th Asia Champions Cup

Tournament details
- Host country: Philippines
- Dates: 29 May–5 June
- Teams: 10
- Venues: 3 (in 3 host cities)

Final positions
- Champions: Qatar (2nd title)

Tournament statistics
- MVP: (Lebanon) Fadi El Khatib

The 2005 FIBA Asia Champions Cup was the 16th staging of the FIBA Asia Champions Cup, the basketball club tournament of FIBA Asia. The tournament was held for the first time in three cities: Quezon City, Pasay and Antipolo, in the Philippines from May 29 to June 5, 2005, with the Final being held in Araneta Coliseum.

Al-Rayyan from Qatar became the second team to win multiple titles by first dethroning the defending three-time champion Sagesse from Lebanon in the thrilling overtime game in the Semifinals, and then surviving Fastlink from Jordan in the Finals. They had previously won the championship in the 2002 edition at Kuala Lumpur.

== Preliminary round ==
=== Group A ===
Team	Pld	W	L	PF	PA	PD	Pts
(Iran) Saba Battery Tehran	4	4	0	321	233	+88	8
(Lebanon) Sagesse	4	3	1	335	300	+35	7
(Philippines) San Miguel Beer	4	2	2	334	301	+33	6
(Kazakhstan) Tobol Kostanay	4	1	3	275	321	−46	5
(India) Young Cagers	4	0	4	231	341	−110	4

May 29
12:30

Saba Battery (Iran)	71–51	(Lebanon) Sagesse
Scoring by quarter: 11–18, 12–10, 22–9, 26–14

Araneta Coliseum, Quezon City

May 29
18:00

San Miguel (Philippines)	81–49	(India) Young Cagers
Scoring by quarter: 28–14, 14–4, 26–19, 13–12

Araneta Coliseum, Quezon City

May 30
14:45

Young Cagers (India)	50–94	(Iran) Saba Battery
Scoring by quarter: 13–17, 6–19, 11–35, 20–23

Araneta Coliseum, Quezon City

May 30
19:15

Tobol (Kazakhstan)	67–88	(Philippines) San Miguel
Scoring by quarter: 14–20, 23–22, 18–18, 12–28

Araneta Coliseum, Quezon City

May 31
17:00

Saba Battery (Iran)	71–57	(Kazakhstan) Tobol
Scoring by quarter: 22–12, 14–11, 22–16, 13–18

Cuneta Astrodome, Pasay

May 31
19:15

Sagesse (Lebanon)	90–64	(India) Young Cagers
Scoring by quarter: 17–11, 20–15, 32–25, 21–13

Cuneta Astrodome, Pasay

June 1
17:00

Tobol (Kazakhstan)	75–94	(Lebanon) Sagesse
Scoring by quarter: 10–22, 26–19, 16–28, 23–25

Araneta Coliseum, Quezon City

June 1
19:15

San Miguel (Philippines)	75–85	(Iran) Saba Battery
Scoring by quarter: 14–19, 20–16, 21–24, 20–26

Araneta Coliseum, Quezon City

June 2
12:30

Young Cagers (India)	68–76	(Kazakhstan) Tobol
Scoring by quarter: 17–15, 18–16, 13–22, 20–23

Ynares Center, Antipolo

June 2
19:15

Sagesse (Lebanon)	100–90	(Philippines) San Miguel
Scoring by quarter: 27–17, 25–24, 20–14, 28–35

Ynares Center, Antipolo

=== Group B ===
Team	Pld	W	L	PF	PA	PD	Pts
(Qatar) Al-Rayyan	4	4	0	356	214	+142	8
(Jordan) Fastlink	4	3	1	338	326	+12	7
Al-Kuwait	4	2	2	325	342	−17	6
(Syria) Al-Jaish	4	1	3	292	325	−33	5
(United Arab Emirates) Al-Sharjah	4	0	4	242	346	−104	4

May 29
14:45

Al-Kuwait	89–85 (OT)	(Syria) Al-Jaish
Scoring by quarter: 19–21, 13–15, 25–18, 17–20, Overtime: 15–11

Araneta Coliseum, Quezon City

May 29
20:15

Al-Sharjah (United Arab Emirates)	61–89	(Jordan) Fastlink
Scoring by quarter: 12–21, 20–20, 16–19, 13–29

Araneta Coliseum, Quezon City

May 30
12:30

Al-Rayyan (Qatar)	101–44	(United Arab Emirates) Al-Sharjah
Scoring by quarter: 28–9, 24–9, 27–13, 22–13

Araneta Coliseum, Quezon City

May 30
17:00

Fastlink (Jordan)	99–95	Al-Kuwait
Scoring by quarter: 15–19, 27–21, 37–30, 20–25

Araneta Coliseum, Quezon City

May 31
12:30

Al-Kuwait	60–84	(Qatar) Al-Rayyan
Scoring by quarter: 13–18, 21–16, 6–20, 20–30

Cuneta Astrodome, Pasay

May 31
14:45

Al-Jaish (Syria)	78–94	(Jordan) Fastlink
Scoring by quarter: 17–21, 17–17, 22–33, 22–23

Cuneta Astrodome, Pasay

June 1
12:30

Al-Sharjah (United Arab Emirates)	74–81	Al-Kuwait
Scoring by quarter: 17–19, 9–24, 27–21, 21–17

Araneta Coliseum, Quezon City

June 1
14:45

Al-Rayyan (Qatar)	79–54	(Syria) Al-Jaish
Scoring by quarter: 24–13, 27–5, 15–20, 13–16

Araneta Coliseum, Quezon City

June 2
14:45

Fastlink (Jordan)	56–92	(Qatar) Al-Rayyan
Scoring by quarter: 10–24, 21–26, 8–15, 17–27

Ynares Center, Antipolo

June 2
17:00

Al-Jaish (Syria)	75–63	(United Arab Emirates) Al-Sharjah
Scoring by quarter: 22–15, 20–13, 17–15, 16–20

Ynares Center, Antipolo

== Classification 9th–10th ==
June 3
10:15

Young Cagers (India)	92–82	(United Arab Emirates) Al-Sharjah
Scoring by quarter: 24–27, 25–16, 11–14, 32–25

Ynares Center, Antipolo

== Final round ==
Quarterfinals
June 3
(Syria) Al-Jaish	65
(Iran) Saba Battery	76
June 3
(Philippines) San Miguel	83
(Jordan) Fastlink	86
June 3
(Kazakhstan) Tobol	82
(Qatar) Al-Rayyan	89
June 3
Al-Kuwait	92
(Lebanon) Sagesse	95

Semifinals
June 4
(Iran) Saba Battery	69
(Jordan) Fastlink	74
June 4
(Qatar) Al-Rayyan (OT)	87
(Lebanon) Sagesse	84

Final
June 5
(Jordan) Fastlink	76
(Qatar) Al-Rayyan	83
3rd place
June 5
(Iran) Saba Battery	71
(Lebanon) Sagesse	74

Semifinals
June 4
(Syria) Al-Jaish	57
(Philippines) San Miguel	73
June 4
(Kazakhstan) Tobol	87
Al-Kuwait	96

5th place
June 5
(Philippines) San Miguel	96
Al-Kuwait	84
7th place
June 5
(Syria) Al-Jaish	77
(Kazakhstan) Tobol	71

=== Quarterfinals ===
June 3
12:30

Al-Jaish (Syria)	65–76	(Iran) Saba Battery
Scoring by quarter: 16–13, 15–28, 22–19, 12–16

Ynares Center, Antipolo

June 3
14:45

Tobol (Kazakhstan)	82–89	(Qatar) Al-Rayyan
Scoring by quarter: 30–25, 17–22, 13–22, 22–20

Ynares Center, Antipolo

June 3
17:00

Al-Kuwait	92–95	(Lebanon) Sagesse
Scoring by quarter: 21–18, 25–20, 22–27, 24–30

Ynares Center, Antipolo

June 3
19:15

San Miguel (Philippines)	83–86	(Jordan) Fastlink
Scoring by quarter: 24–18, 14–21, 21–32, 24–15

Ynares Center, Antipolo

=== Semifinals 5th–8th ===
June 4
12:30

Al-Jaish (Syria)	57–73	(Philippines) San Miguel
Scoring by quarter: 16–19, 18–15, 5–20, 18–19

Ynares Center, Antipolo

June 4
14:45

Tobol (Kazakhstan)	87–96	Al-Kuwait
Scoring by quarter: 23–27, 15–27, 24–22, 25–20

Ynares Center, Antipolo

=== Semifinals ===
June 4
17:00

Saba Battery (Iran)	69–74	(Jordan) Fastlink
Scoring by quarter: 17–17, 15–21, 18–22, 19–14

Ynares Center, Antipolo

June 4
19:15

Sagesse (Lebanon)	84–87 (OT)	(Qatar) Al-Rayyan
Scoring by quarter: 22–20, 23–21, 14–22, 22–18, Overtime: 3–6

Ynares Center, Antipolo

=== 7th place ===
June 5
12:30

Al-Jaish (Syria)	77–71	(Kazakhstan) Tobol
Scoring by quarter: 20–16, 14–21, 23–20, 20–14

Araneta Coliseum, Quezon City

=== 5th place ===
June 5
14:45

San Miguel (Philippines)	96–84	Al-Kuwait
Scoring by quarter: 21–15, 21–25, 27–21, 27–23

Araneta Coliseum, Quezon City

=== 3rd place ===
June 5
17:00

Saba Battery (Iran)	71–74	(Lebanon) Sagesse
Scoring by quarter: 24–18, 14–22, 23–15, 10–19

Araneta Coliseum, Quezon City

=== Final ===
June 5
19:15

Fastlink (Jordan)	76–83	(Qatar) Al-Rayyan
Scoring by quarter: 20–24, 16–21, 18–16, 22–22
Pts: Thurman 22		Pts: Day 30

Araneta Coliseum, Quezon City

== Final standing ==
Rank	Team	Record
Gold medal	(Qatar) Al-Rayyan	7–0
Silver medal	(Jordan) Fastlink	5–2
Bronze medal	(Lebanon) Sagesse	5–2
4	(Iran) Saba Battery Tehran	5–2
5	(Philippines) San Miguel Beer	4–3
6	Al-Kuwait	3–4
7	(Syria) Al-Jaish	2–5
8	(Kazakhstan) Tobol Kostanay	1–6
9	(India) Young Cagers	1–4
10	(United Arab Emirates) Al-Sharjah	0–5

== Awards ==
- Most Valuable Player: (Lebanon) Fadi El Khatib (Sagesse)
- Best Rebounder: (Jordan) Ayman Dais (Fastlink)
- Best Passer: (India) Sambhaji Kadam (Young Cagers)

All-Star Team:

- (Lebanon) Fadi El Khatib (Sagesse)
- (Qatar) Saad Abdulrahman (Al-Rayyan)
- (Qatar) Erfan Ali (Al-Rayyan)
- (Jordan) Enver Soobzokov (Fastlink)
- (Philippines) Rommel Adducul (San Miguel)
