= Mario Abboud =

Lebanese basketball player (born 1981)

No. 15 – Mouttahed Tripoli
- Position: Center
- League: Lebanese Basketball League

Personal information
- Born: August 1, 1981 (age 45) Beirut, Lebanon
- Listed height: 6 ft 10 in (2.08 m)
- Listed weight: 255 lb (116 kg)

Career information
- Playing career: 2010–present

Mario Abboud (born 1 August 1981 in Beirut) is a Lebanese professional basketball center currently playing with Sporting Al Riyadi Beirut of the Lebanese Basketball League.

== Professional sports career ==
Abboud started his basketball career with in the 2012–13 season with Bejjeh SC when he was recruited by Sporting Al Riyadi Beirut Team. He joined Al Riyadi Beirut.
