= Eric Chatfield =

Australian rules footballer, born 1900

Personal information
- Full name: Eric William Chatfield
- Born: 26 November 1900; Bright, Victoria
- Died: 26 February 1985 (aged 84); Mosman, New South Wales

Playing career^{1}
Years	Club	Games (Goals)
1925, 1928	Fitzroy	17 (0)
- ^{1} Playing statistics correct to the end of 1928.

Eric William Chatfield (26 November 1900 – 26 February 1985) was an Australian rules footballer who played with Fitzroy in the Victorian Football League (VFL).
