= Lou Cvijanovich =

American basketball coach

Lou Cvijanovich (September 7, 1926 – November 24, 2018) was an American basketball coach for Santa Clara High School in Oxnard, California from 1958 to 1999. His 829 wins are the most by a high school basketball coach in California history.

== Biography ==
In addition to his 829 victories, Cvijanovich led the Santa Clara program to three California state championships (1989, 1990 and 1999), 15 CIF Southern Section titles, the second highest total in state history, and 30 league championships, the most ever. He was inducted into the California High School Sports Hall of Fame in 1999, the California Coaches Association Hall of Fame in 1998, the National High School Hall of Fame in 1997 and the Ventura County Athletic Hall of Fame. In 1996, Santa Clara High School renamed its gymnasium Cvijanovich Gymnasium. In 2012, the City of Oxnard renamed the portion of Laurel Street in front of Santa Clara High School Coach C Lane in his honor.

In addition to his time as the basketball coach at Santa Clara, Cvijanovich was the head football coach for 17 years and the head baseball coach for 11 years. He posted 104 wins in football, earning a pair of CIF championships and seven league crowns. In his time as the baseball coach, Cvijanovich guided the Saints to a 114–30–2 record, one CIF title, and five league championships. He is the only coach in California prep history to win CIF championships in football, basketball, and baseball.

University of California, Santa Barbara's head coach Bob Williams was quoted in 2004 saying: "Coach Cvijanovich has meant so much to basketball in the state of California, but more than that he has been a great teacher and a tremendous role model for young people." He died in Oxnard, California on November 24, 2018, at the age of 92.
