= Garth Joseph =

Dominica basketball player

Personal information
- Born: August 8, 1973 (age 53) Roseau, Dominica
- Listed height: 7 ft 2 in (2.18 m)
- Listed weight: 315 lb (143 kg)

Career information
- College: Saint Rose (1994–1997)
- NBA draft: 1997: undrafted
- Playing career: 1997–2015
- Position: Center
- Number: 32

Career history
- 1997–1998: Peristeri Athens
- 1998–1999: Mansfield Hawks
- 1999: Atlantic City Seagulls
- 1999–2000: Trenton Shooting Stars
- 2000–2001: Toronto Raptors
- 2001: Denver Nuggets
- 2001–2005: Shaanxi Kylins
- 2002: Adirondack Wildcats
- 2005: ÉS Chalon-sur-Saône
- 2005–2008: Saba Battery
- 2008–2009: Al Gezira
- 2009: BEEM
- 2010: Glam X-Men
- 2015: Prowlers

Career highlights
- Iranian Superleague champion (2006); Tehran Cup winner (2006); CBA blocks leader (2004); 4× CBA rebounding leader (2002–2005); 2× CBA Slam Dunk leader (2002, 2003); IBA champion (1999); IBA All-Star Second Team (1999); USBL All-Defensive Team (1999)
- Stats at NBA.com
- Stats at Basketball Reference

Garth McArthur Fitzgerald Joseph (born August 8, 1973) is a Dominican former professional basketball player.

At 7'2" and 315 pounds, his physique was often compared to that of Shaquille O'Neal, especially when he was a young and raw-skilled center at The College of St. Rose. However, he only appeared in a total of four National Basketball Association games, two with the Denver Nuggets and two with the Toronto Raptors during the 2000–01 NBA season. As of the 2018 offseason, Joseph is still the only Dominican player in NBA history.

Joseph was a member of the Dominica national basketball team.
