= Fajhan Hilal Al-Mutairi Court =

Coordinates: 29.3697°N 47.9783°E

- Interactive map of Fajhan Hilal Al-Mutairi Court
- Location: Kuwait City, Kuwait
- Capacity: 5,000

Tenant
- Al Qadisiya Kuwait

Fajhan Hilal Al-Mutairi Court is an indoor sporting arena located in Kuwait City, Kuwait. The capacity of the arena is 5,000 spectators. It hosts indoor sporting events such as basketball and hosts the home matches of Al Qadisiya Kuwait. It also hosted the FIBA Asia Champions Cup 2006 and FIBA Asia Champions Cup 2008 championships.
