= Blue Stars (Lebanon) =

- Founded: 2001
- Dissolved: 2009
- History: Blue Stars (2001–2009)
- Location: Jamhour, Baabda District, Lebanon

Blue Stars, also known as Jamhour Blue Stars, was a Lebanese professional basketball team based in Jamhour, Baabda District. They competed in the Lebanese Basketball League (LBL). Founded in 2001, they competed in the FIBA Asia Champions Cup 2007, finishing in 5th place. In May 2009, after the club's president suspended the financial sponsorship of the club, the administrative committee met and decided to dissolve the basketball team, officially give the players who signed the club's statements books of dispensation, and participate in the second division next season.

== Notable players ==
- (Lebanon) Jean Abdel-Nour (2003–09)
- (Lebanon) Rony Fahed (2002–2007)
- (Lebanon) Brian Beshara
- (Lebanon) Fadi El Khatib (2006–07)
- (Lebanon) Rodrigue Akl
- (United States) Cedric Henderson
- (United States) Jerald Honeycutt
- (Lebanon) Roy Samaha (2004–07)
- (United States) Dickey Simpkins (2005–06)
