= Santa Clara High School (Oxnard, California) =

Private Catholic high school in Oxnard, California

Location
- 2121 Saviers Road; Oxnard, Ventura, California 93033; United States; 34°10′43″N 119°10′42″W

Information
- Type: Private, Coeducational
- Motto: In Hoc Signo Vinces (With This Sign We Conquer)
- Religious affiliation: Roman Catholic
- Patron saint: St. Clare of Assisi
- Established: 1901; 125 years ago
- Founder: Santa Clara Parish
- Authority: Los Angeles Archdiocese
- Principal: Teresa Palmisano
- Grades: 9-12
- Average class size: 15-20
- Campus: Suburban
- Campus size: 18 Acres
- Colors: Navy and Gold
- Athletics conference: CIF Southern Section; Tri-County Athletic Association
- Nickname: Saints
- Accreditation: Western Association of Schools and Colleges
- Newspaper: The Clarion
- Tuition: $9,250 (2020-2021)
- Website: santaclarahighschool.com

Santa Clara High School (SCHS) is a private, Roman Catholic four-year high school serving grades 9-12 in Oxnard, California. It is in the Roman Catholic Archdiocese of Los Angeles. Originally founded in September 1901, it is the oldest high school in Ventura County.

== History ==
The school, originally named St. Joseph's Institute, was founded by the Sisters of St. Joseph of Carondelet on September 2, 1901. The school moved to the top floor of the Santa Clara Elementary School building on South "E" Street, and in April 1930, the name was changed to Santa Clara High School. Over the next two decades, increasing enrollment necessitated a new facility, and under the leadership of Monsignor Anthony Jacobs and a generous land grant from Mr. and Mrs. Joseph Friedrich, the new Santa Clara High School opened on South Saviers Road in the spring of 1952. In 1964, the high school annexed the adjacent empty junior high school facility, acquiring sixteen new classrooms, office space, and a new auditorium, doubling the capacity of the high school.

In 1967, the school became an Archdiocesan high school, and the operational responsibility of the school shifted to the Archdiocese of Los Angeles. In 1981, the Sisters of St. Joseph, who kept residences at the school, moved to St. Anthony's Convent, and their space was renovated into additional classrooms and office space. In 1986, a new gymnasium, Friedrich Pavilion, was constructed.

== Athletics ==
Santa Clara High School is a CIF Southern Section member school. As of 2018, the Saints compete in the Tri-County Athletic Association for all sports except football. The school's football team competed in the Citrus Coast League in 2018, but left after one season as it switched to eight-man football from the conventional 11-man format due to a lack of players.

Santa Clara is known for its success in basketball. Under head coach Lou Cvijanovich, who began coaching the boys' team in the 1958–59 school year, the Saints won 30 league titles (most league titles of any high school program in the country), 15 CIF-SS titles (second most in California high school history), as well as three California state championships (1989, 1990, 1999). The program appeared in three straight state championship games (1989–1991), winning titles in 1989 and 1990. In Cvijanovich's 41st and final season coaching for Santa Clara, the 1998–99 team captured the state title, winning 30 games and securing Cvijanovich's record 829th victory in the process. Twenty years later, and just three months after Cvijanovich's death, the Saints won a CIF-SS championship in 2019 under Bobby Tenorio.

The Santa Clara boys' soccer team won its first ever CIF-SS championship in 2017.

== Notable staff and alumni ==
- Lou Cvijanovich: Basketball coach from 1958-1999. Coach with the most wins in California high school history.
- Terrance Dotsy: American football player
- Dave Laut: UCLA graduate; won a bronze medal at the 1984 Summer Olympics for shot put. He was inducted into the Ventura County Sports Hall of Fame in 1997.
- Isaiah Mustafa: Actor and professional football player; appeared in Old Spice TV commercial
- Michele Serros: American novelist and poet
- Cierre Wood: NFL running back, Buffalo Bills; indicted on murder and 20 felony child abuse charges in the death of his girlfriend’s 5-year-old daughter in 2019
