= 2007 FIBA Asia Champions Cup =

The FIBA Asia Champions Cup 2007 was the 18th staging of the FIBA Asia Champions Cup, the basketball club tournament of FIBA Asia. The tournament was held in Tehran, Iran. Saba Battery of Tehran, Iran won the tournament after beating Al-Jalaa of Aleppo, Syria

== Preliminary round ==
=== Group A ===
Team	Pld	W	L	PF	PA	PD	Pts
(Lebanon) Blue Stars	2	2	0	177	128	+49	4
(Qatar) Al-Rayyan	2	1	1	168	123	+45	3
(India) Young Cagers	2	0	2	107	201	−94	2
(Jordan) Arena	Withdrew						
(Kuwait) Al-Qadsia	Withdrew						

May 12
19:00

Blue Stars (Lebanon)	76–68	(Qatar) Al-Rayyan
Scoring by quarter: 19–18, 22–16, 15–12, 20–22

Azadi Basketball Hall, Tehran

May 13
18:30

Al-Rayyan (Qatar)	100–47	(India) Young Cagers
Scoring by quarter: 21–10, 22–16, 37–10, 20–11

Azadi Basketball Hall, Tehran

May 15
18:30

Blue Stars (Lebanon)	101–60	(India) Young Cagers
Scoring by quarter: 32–21, 29–16, 25–7, 15–16

Azadi Basketball Hall, Tehran

=== Group B ===
Team	Pld	W	L	PF	PA	PD	Pts
(Iran) Saba Battery Tehran	4	4	0	352	267	+85	8
(Syria) Al-Jalaa	4	3	1	350	290	+60	7
(Kazakhstan) Astana Tigers	4	2	2	291	298	−7	6
(Philippines) San Miguel-Magnolia	4	1	3	333	370	−37	5
(Bahrain) Al-Muharraq	4	0	4	233	334	−101	4

May 12
16:45

Saba Battery (Iran)	78–48	(Bahrain) Al-Muharraq
Scoring by quarter: 18–11, 20–8, 26–10, 14–19

Azadi Basketball Hall, Tehran

May 12
21:15

Astana Tigers (Kazakhstan)	70–94	(Syria) Al-Jalaa
Scoring by quarter: 18–29, 13–21, 10–25, 29–19

Azadi Basketball Hall, Tehran

May 13
16:15

San Miguel (Philippines)	88–101	(Iran) Saba Battery
Scoring by quarter: 25–32, 13–19, 26–27, 24–23

Azadi Basketball Hall, Tehran

May 13
20:45

Al-Muharraq (Bahrain)	57–79	(Kazakhstan) Astana Tigers
Scoring by quarter: 15–25, 18–18, 16–15, 8–21

Azadi Basketball Hall, Tehran

May 14
18:30

Al-Jalaa (Syria)	78–48	(Bahrain) Al-Muharraq
Scoring by quarter: 18–11, 11–17, 26–11, 23–9

Azadi Basketball Hall, Tehran

May 14
20:45

Astana Tigers (Kazakhstan)	75–66	(Philippines) San Miguel
Scoring by quarter: 14–16, 19–11, 22–18, 20–21

Azadi Basketball Hall, Tehran

May 15
16:15

Saba Battery (Iran)	81–67	(Kazakhstan) Astana Tigers
Scoring by quarter: 25–21, 16–17, 18–14, 22–15

Azadi Basketball Hall, Tehran

May 15
20:45

San Miguel (Philippines)	80–114	(Syria) Al-Jalaa
Scoring by quarter: 20–22, 14–35, 22–24, 24–33

Azadi Basketball Hall, Tehran

May 16
16:15

Al-Jalaa (Syria)	64–92	(Iran) Saba Battery
Scoring by quarter: 19–17, 20–19, 11–26, 14–30

Azadi Basketball Hall, Tehran

May 16
20:45

Al-Muharraq (Bahrain)	80–99	(Philippines) San Miguel
Scoring by quarter: 17–20, 21–23, 24–36, 18–20

Azadi Basketball Hall, Tehran

== Knockout round ==
=== Championship ===
Quarter-finals
May 18 – Tehran
(Kazakhstan) Astana Tigers	75
(Qatar) Al-Rayyan	86
May 18 – Tehran
Bye
(Iran) Saba Battery
May 18 – Tehran
(Philippines) San Miguel	94
(Lebanon) Blue Stars	83
May 18 – Tehran
(India) Young Cagers	79
(Syria) Al-Jalaa	102

Semi-finals
May 19 – Tehran
(Qatar) Al-Rayyan	70
(Iran) Saba Battery	74
May 19 – Tehran
(Philippines) San Miguel	77
(Syria) Al-Jalaa	109

Final
May 20 – Tehran
(Iran) Saba Battery	83
(Syria) Al-Jalaa	75
Third place
May 20 – Tehran
(Qatar) Al-Rayyan	95
(Philippines) San Miguel	75

=== 5th–7th places ===
Semi-finals
May 19 – Tehran
(Lebanon) Blue Stars	115
(India) Young Cagers	73
May 19 – Tehran
Bye
(Kazakhstan) Astana Tigers

Fifth place
May 20 – Tehran
(Lebanon) Blue Stars	97
(Kazakhstan) Astana Tigers	82

=== Quarterfinals ===
May 18
16:15

San Miguel (Philippines)	94–83	(Lebanon) Blue Stars
Scoring by quarter: 27–26, 30–13, 13–24, 24–20

Azadi Basketball Hall, Tehran

May 18
18:30

Astana Tigers (Kazakhstan)	75–86	(Qatar) Al-Rayyan
Scoring by quarter: 23–25, 10–22, 20–21, 22–18

Azadi Basketball Hall, Tehran

May 18
20:45

Young Cagers (India)	79–102	(Syria) Al-Jalaa
Scoring by quarter: 24–24, 7–31, 24–26, 24–21

Azadi Basketball Hall, Tehran

=== Semifinals ===
May 19
18:30

5th–7th

Blue Stars (Lebanon)	115–73	(India) Young Cagers
Scoring by quarter: 25–15, 27–16, 34–14, 29–28

Azadi Basketball Hall, Tehran

May 19
16:15

Semis

Al-Rayyan (Qatar)	70–74	(Iran) Saba Battery
Scoring by quarter: 25–14, 11–22, 22–16, 12–22

Azadi Basketball Hall, Tehran

May 19
20:45

Semis

San Miguel (Philippines)	77–109	(Syria) Al-Jalaa
Scoring by quarter: 14–30, 28–24, 15–31, 20–24

Azadi Basketball Hall, Tehran

=== Finals ===
May 20
14:00

5th–6th

Blue Stars (Lebanon)	97–82	(Kazakhstan) Astana Tigers
Scoring by quarter: 23–19, 26–17, 24–21, 24–25

Azadi Basketball Hall, Tehran

May 20
16:15

Bronze

Al-Rayyan (Qatar)	95–75	(Philippines) San Miguel
Scoring by quarter: 20–19, 24–16, 27–17, 24–23

Azadi Basketball Hall, Tehran

May 20
18:30

Gold

Saba Battery (Iran)	83–75	(Syria) Al-Jalaa
Scoring by quarter: 20–13, 21–26, 15–15, 27–21
Pts: S. Nikkhah 25		Pts: Madanly 28

Azadi Basketball Hall, Tehran

== Final standings ==
Rank	Team	Record
Gold medal	(Iran) Saba Battery Tehran	6–0
Silver medal	(Syria) Al-Jalaa	5–2
Bronze medal	(Qatar) Al-Rayyan	3–2
4th	(Philippines) San Miguel-Magnolia	2–5
5th	(Lebanon) Blue Stars	4–1
6th	(Kazakhstan) Astana Tigers	2–4
7th	(India) Young Cagers	0–4
8th	(Bahrain) Al-Muharraq	0–4

== Awards ==
- Most Valuable Player: (Iran) S. Nikkhah (Saba Battery Tehran)
