= Heyat Basketball Shahrekord BC =

Heyat Basketball Shahrekord
- Leagues: Iranian Super League
- Arena: Takhti Arena
- Location: Shahrekord, Iran
- Team colors: White and Blue
- Championships: –
- Website: –
Home	Away

Heyat Basketball Shahrekord Basketball Club was an Iranian professional basketball club based in Shahrekord, Iran. They competed in the Iranian Basketball Super League.

== Notable former players ==
- (Iran) Rasoul Mozaffari
- (Iran) Behnam Yakhchali
- (Serbia) Srđan Jovanović
- (Serbia) Dušan Stević
