= Paykan Tehran Sports Club =

Sports club

Paykan Club is an Iranian sports club based in Tehran, Iran. The club was founded in 1967.

== Teams ==
- Paykan Football Club, competing in the Iran Pro League
- Paykan Volleyball Club, competing in the Iranian Super League
- Paykan Cycling Club
- Paykan Basketball Club
