= 2013 FIBA Asia Championship Group C =

Group C of the 2013 FIBA Asia Championship took place from 1 to 3 August 2011. This is the preliminary round of the 2013 FIBA Asia Championship, with the three teams with the best record (Iran, Korea, China) advancing to 2013 FIBA Asia Championship Group F. Malaysia, the last placed team, was relegated to the 13th–15th classification round.

All games were played at the Mall of Asia Arena in Pasay, Philippines.

== Summary ==
Iran opened the 2013 championship with an unprecedented 90-point win against Malaysia. In a close match between China and Korea, the match was tied with 30 seconds left when Cho Sung-min made his free throws to give the Koreans a two-point lead. Zhou Peng missed a shot for China, and Cho made both of his free throws off an intentional foul. The Koreans held on for the win when Chinese missed three more shots. On the next day, the Chinese scored a 91-point win against Malaysia, thereby eliminating them. Iran maintained a healthy lead against Korea in the second half, never relinquishing it to qualify for the next round. On the final day, the Malaysians had a better offensive output, but were still beaten by Korea, and Iran never relinquished the lead against China to win the group.

== Standings ==
Qualified for the Second Round Group F
Relegated to 13th–15th Classification

Team	Pld	W	L	PF	PA	PD	Pts
Iran	3	3	0	261	141	+120	6
South Korea	3	2	1	208	193	+15	5
China	3	1	2	223	155	+68	4
Malaysia	3	0	3	105	308	−203	3

All times are local (UTC+8).

== August 1 ==
=== Iran vs. Malaysia ===
1 August 2013
11:00

Report

Iran	115–25	Malaysia
Scoring by quarter: 42–3, 16–10, 33–2, 24–10
Pts: Haddadi 21; Rebs: Haddadi 8 Asts: three players 4		Pts: Gan 11; Rebs: Wong 2 Asts: Kuek 5

Mall of Asia Arena, Pasay
Referees: Yevgeniy Mikheyev (KAZ), Hatim Alharbi (KSA), Abdulkarim Shakeeb (BHR)

Iran
#	Player	Min	FG		2FG		FT		REB			AST	PF	TO	STL	BS	Pts
#	Player	Min	M/A	%	M/A	%	M/A	%	OFF	DEF	TOT	AST	PF	TO	STL	BS	Pts
4	Mohammad Jamshidi	25	6/10	60	6/8	75	0/0	0	1	2	3	4	0	3	2	0	12
5	Aren Davoudi	13	0/2	0	0/0	0	2/2	100	0	2	2	3	2	0	1	0	2
6	Javad Davari	16	1/5	20	0/3	0	5/6	83.3	0	0	0	1	2	0	0	0	8
7	Mehdi Kamrani	11	5/7	71.4	3/4	75	0/1	0	0	2	2	2	0	0	2	0	12
8	Saman Veisi	19	4/5	80	4/5	80	1/2	50	0	6	6	3	0	0	0	1	9
9	Oshin Sahakian	18	5/7	71.4	5/5	100	0/2	0	1	4	5	3	1	2	0	0	10
10	Hamed Afagh	20	3/10	30	2/5	40	0/0	0	0	2	2	4	2	0	0	0	7
11	Hamed Sohrabnejad	16	2/5	40	2/5	40	0/0	0	1	4	5	1	1	1	0	0	4
12	Asghar Kardoust	14	7/8	87.5	7/8	87.5	1/2	50	2	3	5	2	0	2	0	0	15
13	Rouzbeh Arghavan	20	2/4	50	2/4	50	0/1	0	2	4	6	2	1	0	0	0	4
14	Samad Nikkhah Bahrami	15	4/5	80	3/4	75	2/3	66.7	2	1	3	4	1	2	2	1	11
15	Hamed Haddadi	13	8/9	88.9	8/9	88.9	5/5	100	3	5	8	2	0	0	0	1	21
Totals		200	47/77	61	42/60	70	16/24	66.7	12	36	48	31	10	11	7	3	115

Malaysia
#	Player	Min	FG		2FG		FT		REB			AST	PF	TO	STL	BS	Pts
#	Player	Min	M/A	%	M/A	%	M/A	%	OFF	DEF	TOT	AST	PF	TO	STL	BS	Pts
4	Eng Heng Soo	22	1/3	33.3	1/3	33.3	0/0	0	0	4	4	0	2	5	0	0	2
5	Sing Tee Ng	6	0/4	0	0/3	0	0/0	0	0	0	0	0	1	0	1	0	0
6	Wee Seng Wong	10	1/5	20	0/1	0	0/0	0	0	0	1	1	0	0	0	0	3
7	Wei Hong Choo	18	0/5	0	0/1	0	0/0	0	0	3	3	1	2	3	0	0	0
8	Ban Sin Ooi	24	0/6	0/2	0	2/2	100	0	2	2	0	2	5	1	0	0	2
9	Wen Keong Tong	21	1/4	25	0/1	0	0/0	0	0	2	2	1	0	3	0	0	3
10	Hong Hoong Gan	22	4/6	66.7	1/3	33.3	0/0	0	1	0	1	0	0	5	0	0	11
11	Tian Yuan Kuek	28	1/6	16.7	1/4	25	0/0	0	0	5	5	0	4	7	0	0	2
13	Chin Yong Wong	29	0/4	0	0/3	0	0/0	0	0	2	2	2	4	4	0	0	0
14	Lok Seng Mak	11	1/2	50	1/2	50	0/0	0	0	2	2	1	0	1	0	0	2
15	Min Joe Foong	8	0/2	0	0/2	0	0/0	0	0	1	1	0	5	1	0	1	0
Totals		200	9/47	19.1	4/25	16	2/2	100	2	21	23	6	21	35	2	1	25

=== China vs. Korea ===
1 August 2013
17:45

Report

China	59–63	South Korea
Scoring by quarter: 15–13, 16–16, 11–17, 17–17
Pts: Yi 23; Rebs: Yi, Wang Z.L. 10; Asts: Sun 3		Pts: Kim J.S. 15; Rebs: Yang D.G., Cho 4 Asts: Yang D.G. 4

Mall of Asia Arena, Pasay
Referees: Mohammad Alamiri (BHR), Mohammad Ramadan Naser Abu Rashed (JOR), Ricor Buaron (PHI)

China
#	Player	Min	FG		2FG		FT		REB			AST	PF	TO	STL	BS	Pts
#	Player	Min	M/A	%	M/A	%	M/A	%	OFF	DEF	TOT	AST	PF	TO	STL	BS	Pts
4	Guo Ailun	4	1/1	100	1/1	100	0/0	0	0	1	1	0	1	1	0	0	2
5	Liu Xiaoyu	11	3/3	100	3/3	100	0/1	0	1	2	3	0	4	1	0	0	6
6	Chen Jianghua	25	1/5	20	1/3	33.3	0/2	0	0	1	1	1	4	1	0	0	2
7	Wang Shipeng	25	0/5	0	0/1	0	1/2	50	1	1	2	2	3	5	0	0	1
8	Zhu Fangyu	18	0/5	0	0/2	0	4/4	100	1	2	3	1	3	0	0	0	4
9	Sun Yue	27	1/5	20	1/2	50	0/0	0	0	1	1	3	1	1	2	1	2
10	Li Xiaoxu	7	0/1	0	0/1	0	0/0	0	0	1	1	1	2	0	0	0	0
11	Yi Jianlian	30	7/14	50	7/13	53.8	9/11	81.8	4	6	10	0	3	5	1	1	23
12	Zhang Bo	9	1/2	50	1/2	50	0/0	0	0	0	0	0	4	0	0	0	2
13	Wang Zhelin	18	2/3	66.7	2/3	66.7	1/4	25	6	4	10	0	1	2	1	0	5
14	Wang Zhizhi	3	2/2	100	2/2	100	0/0	0	0	0	0	0	0	1	0	0	4
15	Zhou Peng	22	3/9	33.3	3/8	37.5	2/2	100	0	2	2	2	0	0	0	0	8
Totals		200	21/55	38.2	21/41	51.2	17/26	65.4	16	22	38	10	26	18	4	2	59

South Korea
#	Player	Min	FG		2FG		FT		REB			AST	PF	TO	STL	BS	Pts
#	Player	Min	M/A	%	M/A	%	M/A	%	OFF	DEF	TOT	AST	PF	TO	STL	BS	Pts
4	Kim Min-Goo	5	0/0	0/0	0	0/0	0	0	0	0	0	1	1	0	0	0	0
5	Kim Sun-Hyung	17	3/6	50	3/5	60	3/5	60	0	2	2	1	2	2	0	0	3
6	Yang Dong-Geun	27	1/4	25	0/2	0	8/8	100	1	3	4	4	2	2	0	0	11
7	Kim Tae-Sul	13	0/3	0	0/2	0	3/4	75	1	2	3	1	1	2	0	0	3
8	Moon Seong-Gon	2	1/2	50	1/2	50	0/2	0	1	1	2	0	1	0	0	0	2
9	Yun Ho-Young	13	0/1	0	0/1	0	0/0	0	0	3	3	1	3	1	0	0	0
10	Cho Sung-Min	32	3/6	50	3/5	60	6/6	100	0	4	4	2	1	3	0	0	12
11	Kim Joo-Sung	19	6/7	85.7	6/6	100	3/3	100	2	1	3	1	3	1	1	0	15
12	Kim Jong-Kyu	26	1/4	25	1/4	25	0/0	0	0	1	1	0	0	0	0	0	2
13	Choi Jun-Yong	11	1/4	25	1/2	50	0/0	0	0	1	1	0	0	0	1	1	2
14	Lee Seung-Jun	21	3/6	50	3/6	50	0/0	0	1	0	1	1	4	2	1	0	6
15	Lee Jong-Hyun	14	0/3	0	0/3	0	1/2	50	1	2	3	2	0	1	0	0	1
Totals		200	19/46	41.3	18/38	47.4	24/30	80	7	21	28	14	22	16	4	1	63

== August 2 ==
=== China vs. Malaysia ===
2 August 2013
11:00

Report

China	113–22	Malaysia
Scoring by quarter: 31–2, 24–10, 24–7, 34–3
Pts: Wang Z.L. 21; Rebs: Wang Z.L. 8 Asts: Li 7		Pts: Ooi 9 Rebs: Gan. Wong C.Y. 4 Asts: Ooi, Tong 1

Mall of Asia Arena, Pasay

China
#	Player	Min	FG		2FG		FT		REB			AST	PF	TO	STL	BS	Pts
#	Player	Min	M/A	%	M/A	%	M/A	%	OFF	DEF	TOT	AST	PF	TO	STL	BS	Pts
4	Guo Ailun	18	7/8	87.5	5/5	100	0/0	0	♙	1	4	2	1	1	4	0	16
5	Liu Xiaoyu	22	2/6	33.3	1/4	25	2/2	100	♙	4	5	3	0	0	3	0	7
6	Chen Jianghua	10	0/3	0	0/1	0	0/0	0	♙	0	2	3	1	0	0	0	0
7	Wang Shipeng	20	1/3	33	0/0	0	2/3	66.7	0	2	2	3	1	0	0	0	5
8	Zhu Fangyu	19	6/9	66.7	2/2	100	0/0	0	♙	0	1	5	1	1	0	0	16
9	Sun Yue	20	2/6	33.3	0/1	0	0/0	0	0	4	4	2	0	0	0	0	6
10	Li Xiaoxu	24	4/6	66.7	4/6	66.7	0/0	0	2	5	7	7	2	1	0	0	8
11	Yi Jianlian	Did not play															
12	Zhang Bo	18	3/8	37.5	2/6	33.3	1/2	50	0	0	0	0	3	0	0	0	8
13	Wang Zhelin	23	9/12	75	9/12	75	3/7	42.9	5	3	8	0	1	0	0	2	21
14	Wang Zhizhi	18	8/11	72.7	7/9	77.8	0/0	0	1	2	3	5	0	0	0	1	17
15	Zhou Peng	10	3/4	75	3/4	75	3/5	60	1	4	5	0	0	0	0	0	9
Totals		200	45/76	59.2	33/50	66	11/19	57.9	17	26	43	27	9	4	7	3	113

Malaysia
#	Player	Min	FG		2FG		FT		REB			AST	PF	TO	STL	BS	Pts
#	Player	Min	M/A	%	M/A	%	M/A	%	OFF	DEF	TOT	AST	PF	TO	STL	BS	Pts
4	Eng Heng Soo	14	0/2	0	0/2	0	0/0	0	1	1	2	1	2	2	0	0	0
5	Sing Tee Ng	10	0/2	0	0/2	0	0/0	0	0	0	0	0	2	0	0	0	0
6	Wee Seng Wong	11	0/2	0	0/1	0	0/0	0	0	1	1	0	1	3	0	0	0
7	Wei Hong Choo	16	0/4	0	0/3	0	0/0	0	0	1	1	0	0	1	0	0	0
8	Ban Sin Ooi	27	2/9	22.2	0/2	0	3/4	75	0	2	4	1	1	9	0	0	9
9	Wen Keong Tong	26	1/4	25	1/3	33.3	0/0	0	0	1	1	1	3	4	0	0	2
10	Hong Hoong Gan	20	1/4	25	0/2	0	0/0	0	1	3	4	0	2	2	0	0	3
11	Tian Yuan Kuek	24	1/8	12.5	1/5	20	0/0	0	0	3	3	0	4	2	0	0	2
13	Chin Yong Wong	21	1/5	20	1/4	25	0/0	0	2	2	4	0	1	6	1	0	2
14	Lok Seng Mak	12	0/0	0	0/0	0	0/0	0	0	2	2	0	0	2	0	0	0
15	Min Joe Foong	19	2/4	50	2/4	50	0/0	0	1	2	3	0	1	2	0	0	4
Totals		200	8/44	18.2	5/27	18.5	3/4	75	7	21	28	3	17	33	1	0	22

=== Korea vs. Iran ===
2 August 2013
17:45

Report

South Korea	65–76	Iran
Scoring by quarter: 15–18, 19–12, 7–21, 24–25
Pts: Cho 15; Rebs: Kim M.G. 7 Asts: Kim J.S. 3		Pts: Haddadi 30; Rebs: Haddadi 13; Asts: Kamrani 9

Mall of Asia Arena, Pasay
Referees: Harja Jaladri (INA), Atanu Banerjee (IND), Ferdinand Pascual (PHI)

South Korea
#	Player	Min	FG		2FG		FT		REB			AST	PF	TO	STL	BS	Pts
#	Player	Min	M/A	%	M/A	%	M/A	%	OFF	DEF	TOT	AST	PF	TO	STL	BS	Pts
4	Kim Min-Goo	21	4/10	40	1/2	50	0/0	0	3	4	7	1	3	0	2	0	11
5	Kim Sun-Hyung	25	3/11	27.3	3/8	37.5	0/0	0	1	2	3	2	0	2	0	0	6
6	Yang Dong-Geun	15	1/4	25	1/2	50	0/0	0	0	0	0	0	2	1	0	0	2
7	Kim Tae-Sul	8	0/0	0	0/0	0	0/0	0	0	0	0	2	0	1	0	0	0
8	Moon Seong-Gon	1	0/1	0	0/0	0	0/0	0	0	0	0	0	0	0	0	0	0
9	Yun Ho-Young	10	0/0	0	0/0	0	1/2	50	0	1	1	1	2	1	0	0	1
10	Cho Sung-Min	31	3/8	37.5	1/3	33.3	7/8	87.5	2	2	4	2	3	0	1	0	15
11	Kim Joo-Sung	20	2/7	28.6	2/7	28.6	1/2	50	0	1	1	3	5	0	0	1	5
12	Kim Jong-Kyu	25	5/8	67.5	5/8	67.5	1/2	50	2	1	3	0	2	0	0	0	11
13	Choi Jun-Yong	11	0/2	0	0/2	0	2/3	66.7	0	2	2	1	0	1	0	1	2
14	Lee Seung-Jun	16	1/5	20	0/2	0	1/2	50	1	5	6	0	2	0	0	2	4
15	Lee Jong-Hyun	19	3/6	50	3/6	50	2/2	100	2	2	4	1	4	1	1	1	8
Totals		200	22/62	35.5	16/40	40	15/21	71.4	15	22	37	13	23	7	4	5	65

Iran
#	Player	Min	FG		2FG		FT		REB			AST	PF	TO	STL	BS	Pts
#	Player	Min	M/A	%	M/A	%	M/A	%	OFF	DEF	TOT	AST	PF	TO	STL	BS	Pts
4	Mohammad Jamshidi	12	1/2	50	0/0	0	0/0	0	0	1	1	0	2	0	0	0	3
5	Aren Davoudi	15	0/1	0	0/0	0	2/2	100	0	2	2	0	2	0	0	0	2
6	Javad Davari	4	0/1	0	0/0	0	0/0	0	0	0	0	0	1	2	0	0	0
7	Mehdi Kamrani	31	2/6	33.3	2/5	40	1/4	25	1	3	4	9	3	1	0	3	5
8	Saman Veisi	5	0/1	0	0/1	0	0/0	0	1	0	1	0	0	0	0	0	0
9	Oshin Sahakian	24	1/5	20	1/5	20	2/2	100	3	2	5	0	2	1	0	0	4
10	Hamed Afagh	17	1/4	25	1/2	50	0/0	0	2	1	3	1	5	0	2	0	2
11	Hamed Sohrabnejad	Did not play															
12	Asghar Kardoust	8	1/2	50	1/2	50	2/3	66.7	0	0	0	0	0	0	0	1	4
13	Rouzbeh Arghavan	17	1/5	20	1/4	25	1/2	50	4	2	6	0	4	3	0	0	3
14	Samad Nikkhah Bahrami	39	9/21	42.9	9/17	52.9	5/5	100	1	6	7	4	2	0	1	1	23
15	Hamed Haddadi	30	12/19	63.2	12/19	63.2	6/12	50	5	8	13	1	2	0	0	1	30
Totals		200	28/67	41.8	27/55	49.1	19/30	63.3	21	26	47	15	23	8	3	6	76

== August 3 ==
=== Malaysia vs. Korea ===
3 August 2013
11:00

Report

Malaysia	58–80	South Korea
Scoring by quarter: 15–22, 14–22, 19–14, 10–22
Pts: Kuek 25; Rebs: Ooi 6 Asts: Gan 3		Pts: Lee S.J. 18; Rebs: Lee S.J., Lee J.H. 9 Asts: Yang 6

Mall of Asia Arena, Pasay
Referees: Mohammad Naser Ramadan Abu Rashed (JOR), Hatim Hamed Alharbi (KSA), Glenn Cornelio (PHI)

Malaysia
#	Player	Min	FG		2FG		FT		REB			AST	PF	TO	STL	BS	Pts
#	Player	Min	M/A	%	M/A	%	M/A	%	OFF	DEF	TOT	AST	PF	TO	STL	BS	Pts
4	Eng Heng Soo	20	1/3	33.3	0/0	0	2/2	100	0	1	1	2	4	0	0	0	5
5	Sing Tee Ng	16	0/1	0	0/0	0	2/2	100	0	2	2	0	1	0	1	0	2
6	Wee Seng Wong	12	0/1	0	0/1	0	0/0	0	0	3	3	1	0	2	0	0	0
7	Wei Hong Choo	9	1/4	25	1/1	100	1/2	50	1	1	2	0	2	2	0	0	3
8	Ban Sin Ooi	27	1/11	9.1	0/7	0	2/2	100	3	3	6	2	3	5	0	0	5
9	Wen Keong Tong	17	0/1	0	0/1	0	0/0	0	0	2	2	2	0	2	1	0	0
10	Hong Hoong Gan	29	4/8	50	2/6	33.3	0/0	0	0	3	3	3	2	3	1	0	10
11	Tian Yuan Kuek	27	10/15	66.7	5/6	83.3	0/0	0	0	1	1	2	5	4	0	0	25
13	Chin Yong Wong	21	2/6	33.3	2/5	40	0/0	0	0	1	1	3	2	1	1	0	4
14	Lok Seng Mak	1	0/0	0	0/0	0	0/0	0	2	0	2	0	0	0	0	0	0
15	Min Joe Foong	20	2/6	33.3	2/5	40	0/0	0	1	1	2	0	2	1	1	0	4
Totals		200	21/56	37.5	12/32	37.5	7/8	87.5	7	19	26	15	21	20	5	0	58

South Korea
#	Player	Min	FG		2FG		FT		REB			AST	PF	TO	STL	BS	Pts
#	Player	Min	M/A	%	M/A	%	M/A	%	OFF	DEF	TOT	AST	PF	TO	STL	BS	Pts
4	Kim Min-Goo	15	2/7	28.6	0/0	0	0/0	0	1	2	3	2	1	2	0	0	6
5	Kim Sun-Hyung	20	2/8	25	2/5	40	0/0	0	1	2	3	3	0	1	0	0	4
6	Yang Dong-Geun	20	0/3	0	0/1	0	0/0	0	2	2	4	6	1	0	1	0	0
7	Kim Tae-Sul	20	1/2	50	1/1	100	1/2	50	2	2	4	4	2	1	1	0	3
8	Moon Seong-Gon	10	4/7	57.1	2/2	100	0/0	0	0	0	0	1	3	1	0	0	10
9	Yun Ho-Young	10	2/2	100	1/1	100	0/0	0	0	3	3	1	0	2	0	0	5
10	Cho Sung-Min	20	4/9	44.4	3/6	50	2/2	100	0	0	0	1	2	0	1	0	11
11	Kim Joo-Sung	20	2/3	66.7	2/3	66.7	3/4	75	1	2	3	2	0	2	1	0	7
12	Kim Jong-Kyu	19	2/5	40	2/5	40	0/0	0	1	2	3	2	5	3	0	0	4
13	Choi Jun-Yong	7	0/6	0	0/3	0	0/2	0	1	1	2	0	0	0	0	0	0
14	Lee Seung-Jun	20	8/8	100	8/8	100	2/4	50	3	6	9	1	3	5	0	0	18
15	Lee Jong-Hyun	21	4/5	80	4/5	80	4/7	57.1	5	4	9	3	0	2	1	3	12
Totals		200	31/65	47.7	25/40	62.5	12/21	57.1	17	26	43	26	17	19	5	3	80

=== Iran vs. China ===
3 August 2013
17:45

Report

Iran	70–51	China
Scoring by quarter: 26–16, 15–8, 13–17, 16–10
Pts: Haddadi 15; Rebs: Haddadi, Sahakian 7 Asts: Bahrami 8		Pts: Wang S.P. 11; Rebs: Zhu F.Y., Wang Z.Z. 5 Asts: Sun Y. 3

Mall of Asia Arena, Pasay

Iran
#	Player	Min	FG		2FG		FT		REB			AST	PF	TO	STL	BS	Pts
#	Player	Min	M/A	%	M/A	%	M/A	%	OFF	DEF	TOT	AST	PF	TO	STL	BS	Pts
4	Mohammad Jamshidi	7	0/4	0	0/2	0	0/0	0	0	1	1	1	2	0	0	0	0
5	Aren Davoudi	15	0/1	0	0/0	0	3/4	75	0	3	4	3	3	1	1	0	3
6	Javad Davari	10	0/2	0	0/1	0	0/0	0	1	1	2	0	2	2	1	0	0
7	Mehdi Kamrani	25	1/3	33.3	1/1	100	1/1	100	1	1	2	3	3	2	4	0	3
8	Saman Veisi	4	1/2	50	1/1	100	0/0	0	1	0	1	0	0	0	0	0	2
9	Oshin Sahakian	25	3/7	42.9	3/5	60	7/8	87.5	4	3	7	0	2	1	0	0	13
10	Hamed Afagh	26	5/8	62.5	3/5	60	0/0	0	1	2	3	1	0	1	0	0	12
11	Hamed Sohrabnejad	11	2/4	50	2/3	66.7	2/3	66.7	1	4	5	0	0	0	1	0	6
12	Asghar Kardoust	10	3/3	100	3/3	100	0/2	0	2	0	2	0	2	0	0	0	6
13	Rouzbeh Arghavan	9	0/2	0	0/1	0	0/0	0	0	1	1	0	2	1	1	0	0
14	Samad Nikkhah Bahrami	33	3/11	27.3	2/10	20	3/5	60	0	1	1	8	4	3	2	0	10
15	Hamed Haddadi	25	5/12	41.7	5/12	41.7	5/7	71.4	5	2	7	0	0	3	1	1	15
Totals		200	23/59	39	20/44	45.5	21/30	70	16	21	37	16	20	15	11	1	70

China
#	Player	Min	FG		2FG		FT		REB			AST	PF	TO	STL	BS	Pts
#	Player	Min	M/A	%	M/A	%	M/A	%	OFF	DEF	TOT	AST	PF	TO	STL	BS	Pts
4	Guo Ailun	18	1/4	25	1/3	33.3	1/2	50	2	2	4	2	3	2	0	0	3
5	Liu Xiaoyu	19	3/4	75	3/4	75	0/0	0	0	0	0	2	5	2	1	0	6
6	Chen Jianghua	3	0/1	0	0/0	0	0/0	0	0	0	0	0	1	1	0	0	0
7	Wang Shipeng	30	4/10	40	1/2	50	0/2	0	0	3	3	0	2	6	1	0	11
8	Zhu Fangyu	24	0/2	0	0/0	0	4/6	66.7	1	4	5	2	3	0	0	0	4
9	Sun Yue	19	0/3	0	0/0	0	0/2	0	0	2	2	3	2	1	2	0	0
10	Li Xiaoxu	21	3/6	50	3/6	50	0/0	0	2	4	6	0	0	2	0	0	6
11	Yi Jianlian	Did not play															
12	Zhang Bo	5	0/0	0	0/0	0	0/0	0	0	0	0	0	1	1	0	0	0
13	Wang Zhelin	20	3/5	60	3/5	60	0/0	0	1	0	1	0	3	2	0	0	6
14	Wang Zhizhi	20	3/8	37.5	1/5	20	1/2	50	1	4	5	0	2	1	1	1	9
15	Zhou Peng	20	2/3	66.7	2/2	100	2/2	100	0	3	3	0	4	1	0	1	6
Totals		200	19/46	41.3	14/27	51.9	8/16	50	10	23	33	9	27	22	5	2	51
