= Basketball at the 2010 Asian Games – Men's tournament =

Men at the 2010 Asian Games
- Venue: Huangpu Gymnasium; Guangti Gymnasium; Guangzhou International Sports Arena; Ying Tung Gymnasium
- Date: 13–26 November 2010
- Competitors: 189 from 16 nations

Medalists
gold medal	China
silver medal	South Korea
bronze medal	Iran

Men's basketball at the 2010 Asian Games was held in Guangzhou from 13 November to 26 November 2010.

== Squads ==
Afghanistan	Athletes from Kuwait	China	Chinese Taipei
Yousof Etemadi; Nafi Mashriqi; Qais Haider; Masseh Tahiry; Sayed Yussuf Ansary; Habib Kabir; Abdullah Karimi; Haroun Arefi; Ali Sajad Noorzad; Safi Mojaddidi; Shikaeb Rahi Soratgar; Mohammad Sayed Amiri	Ahmad Al-Baloushi; Shayee Mohanna; Saleh Al-Brahim; Rashed Al-Rabah; Abdulaziz Al-Rabiah; Abdulaziz Dhari; Mohammad Ashkanani; Abdulaziz Al-Hamidi; Nayef Al-Rashidi; Hussain Al-Khabbaz; Abdullah Al-Shammari	Ding Jinhui; Liu Wei; Zhang Qingpeng; Wang Shipeng; Zhu Fangyu; Sun Yue; Zhang Zhaoxu; Zhang Bo; Tang Zhengdong; Li Xiaoxu; Wang Zhizhi; Zhou Peng	Yang Chin-min; Chen Shih-nien; Lee Hsueh-lin; Mao Chia-en; Wu Tai-hao; Chen Shun-hsiang; Chou Po-chen; Tien Lei; Lin Chih-chieh; Lu Cheng-ju; Chien Chia-hung; Hung Chih-shan
Hong Kong	India	Iran	Japan
Liang Man Hung; Cheung Wai Hong; Chow Kin Wan; Mike Heung; Chow Ka Kui; Szeto Wai Kit; Chan Yik Lun; Poon Chi Ho; Fong Shing Yee; Wong Chun Wai; Lau Hoi To; Tsoi Lung Tak	Hareesh Koroth; C. V. Dinesh; Dishant Vipul Shah; Prakash Mishra; Kiranpal Singh; Vishesh Bhriguvanshi; Sunil Kumar Rathee; Eudrick Pereira; Trideep Rai; Jayram Jat; Yadwinder Singh; Jagdeep Singh	Amir Amini; Aren Davoudi; Javad Davari; Mehdi Kamrani; Saeid Davarpanah; Oshin Sahakian; Hamed Afagh; Hamed Sohrabnejad; Ali Jamshidi; Asghar Kardoust; Samad Nikkhah Bahrami; Ali Doraghi	Yusuke Okada; Daiji Yamada; Ryota Sakurai; Takumi Ishizaki; Kenta Hirose; Hiroyuki Kinoshita; Kosuke Takeuchi; Tomoo Amino; Ken Takeda; Yuta Tabuse; Shunsuke Ito; Joji Takeuchi
Jordan	Mongolia	North Korea	Philippines
Fadel Al-Najjar; Nedal Al-Sharif; Malek Khashan; Ahmad Al-Hamarsheh; Ali El-Zubi; Khaldoon Abu Ruqayah; Abdalla Abuqoura; Mohammad Hussein; Mahmoud Abdeen; Ali Jamal Zaghab; Mohammad Hadrab; Faisal Khair	Dambyn Bat-Erdene; Mönkhbayaryn Badrakh; Mönkhtöriin Otgonmönkh; Ganboldyn Battör; Oyuunbilegiin Sainbayar; Ganbaataryn Ikhbayar; Oyuuntsetsegiin Uuganbayar; Shiinengiin Sedbazar; Bataagiin Mönkhbold; Tserenjankharyn Sharavjamts; Tungalagiin Sanchir; Namjildorjiin Zoljargal	Choe Song-jin; O Jin-hyok; Ho Il; An Yong-bin; Pak Myong-jin; Pak Un-chol; Sin Kum-byol; Kye Kwang-u; Kim Un-chol; O Jin-chol; Ri Kum-song; Kim Chang-myong	Mark Barroca; Chris Tiu; JVee Casio; Sol Mercado; Japeth Aguilar; Greg Slaughter; Mac Baracael; Asi Taulava; Jason Ballesteros; Kelly Williams; Marcio Lassiter; Chris Lutz
Qatar	South Korea	Turkmenistan	Uzbekistan
Tanguy Ngombo; Abdullah Matalkeh; Saad Abdulrahman; Daoud Musa; Khalid Suliman; Mohammed Fakhirah; Yasseen Ismail; Baker Ahmad; Mame Ndour; Mohammed Abdulla; Hashim Zaidan; Hammam Omer	Park Chan-hee; Lee Jung-suk; Yang Dong-geun; Kim Joo-sung; Ha Seung-jin; Lee Kyu-sup; Cho Sung-min; Yang Hee-jong; Ham Ji-hoon; Kim Sung-chul; Lee Seung-jun; Oh Se-keun	Maksat Almerdenow; Allamyrad Şamämmedow; Toýly Baýryýew; Aleksandr Paşkow; Kerim Satylow; Kurbanmurad Karataýew; Igor Mazurow; Berdi Atahanow; Pawel Awerýanow; Begenç Akmämmedow; Rasul Kakalyýew; Maksim Otbozin	Kirill Gusev; Hurmatjon Nuraliev; Gennadiy Zinovev; Viacheslav Denisov; Evgeniy Shatrov; Denis Timofeev; Aleksandr Yahin; Evgeniy Pereverzev; Artur Sharafutdinov; Samandar Juginisov

== Results ==
All times are China Standard Time (UTC+08:00)

=== Qualifying round ===
==== Group A ====
Pos	Team	Pld	W	L	PF	PA	PD	Pts	Qualification
1	North Korea	1	1	0	78	71	+7	2	Preliminary round
2	Hong Kong	1	0	1	71	78	−7	1	

Source: Results

13 November
19:15

Hong Kong	71–78	North Korea
Scoring by quarter: 21–16, 16–20, 10–20, 24–22
Pts: Liang 12; Rebs: Fong 9 Asts: Wong 3		Pts: Pak U. 19; Rebs: Kye 13; Asts: Kye 5

Huangpu Gymnasium, Guangzhou
Referees: Eddie Viator (FRA), Teerapong Yodsint (THA), Ramesh Kumar (IND)

==== Group B ====
Pos	Team	Pld	W	L	PF	PA	PD	Pts	Qualification
1	Philippines	1	1	0	76	69	+7	2	Preliminary round
2	Athletes from Kuwait	1	0	1	69	76	−7	1	

Source: Results

13 November
19:15

Philippines	76–69	Athletes from Kuwait
Scoring by quarter: 11–16, 27–21, 19–22, 19–10
Pts: Lassiter 16; Rebs: Williams 10; Asts: Baracael 3		Pts: Al-Baloushi 21; Rebs: Al-Brahim 14; Asts: Al-Baloushi, Al-Brahim 2

Guangti Gymnasium, Guangzhou
Referees: Pablo Estévez (ARG), Ravshan Ganiev (UZB), Yang Maogong (CHN)

==== Group C ====
Pos	Team	Pld	W	L	PF	PA	PD	Pts	Qualification
1	Mongolia	1	1	0	90	85	+5	2	Preliminary round
2	Turkmenistan	1	0	1	85	90	−5	1	

Source: Results

14 November
19:15

Turkmenistan	85–90	Mongolia
Scoring by quarter: 24–27, 22–19, 19–24, 20–20
Pts: Paşkow 25; Rebs: Awerýanow 12; Asts: Baýryýew 4		Pts: Sedbazar 22; Rebs: Sedbazar 9 Asts: Ikhbayar 6

Guangti Gymnasium, Guangzhou
Referees: Lau Cheuk Fai (HKG), Kim Young-woo (KOR), Mohammad Al-Amiri (KUW)

==== Group D ====
Pos	Team	Pld	W	L	PF	PA	PD	Pts	Qualification
1	India	1	1	0	83	76	+7	2	Preliminary round
2	Afghanistan	1	0	1	76	83	−7	1	

Source: Results

15 November
19:15

Afghanistan	76–83	India
Scoring by quarter: 16–14, 22–16, 15–23, 23–30
Pts: Mojaddidi 25; Rebs: Mashriqi 12; Asts: Etemadi, Mojaddidi 5		Pts: J. Singh 22; Rebs: J. Singh 8 Asts: Rai 5

Guangti Gymnasium, Guangzhou
Referees: Cristiano Maranho (BRA), Ferdinand Pascual (PHI), Fong Kin Lung (HKG)

=== Preliminary round ===
==== Group E ====
Pos	Team	Pld	W	L	PF	PA	PD	Pts	Qualification
1	China	5	5	0	462	258	+204	10	Quarterfinals
2	South Korea	5	4	1	475	311	+164	9	Quarterfinals
3	Jordan	5	3	2	339	403	−64	8	Quarterfinals
4	North Korea	5	2	3	377	421	−44	7	Quarterfinals
5	Mongolia	5	1	4	310	438	−128	6	
6	Uzbekistan	5	0	5	283	415	−132	5	

Source: Results

16 November
19:15

China	91–46	Mongolia
Scoring by quarter: 22–8, 26–13, 19–13, 24–12
Pts: Zhou 16; Rebs: Li 9 Asts: Zhang B. 4		Pts: Ikhbayar 8 Rebs: Sainbayar 7 Asts: Badrakh 2

International Sports Arena, Guangzhou
Referees: Pablo Estévez (ARG), Amir Hossein Safarzadeh (IRI), Teerapong Yodsint (THA)

16 November
19:15

South Korea	103–54	Uzbekistan
Scoring by quarter: 25–11, 21–13, 28–16, 29–14
Pts: Lee S. 20; Rebs: Lee S. 8 Asts: Yang D. 4		Pts: Juginisov 27; Rebs: Juginisov 9 Asts: Gusev, Sharafutdinov 2

Ying Tung Gymnasium, Guangzhou
Referees: Ferdinand Pascual (PHI), Andy Cheung (HKG), Wu Ying-wei (TPE)

16 November
21:30

Jordan	90–80	North Korea
Scoring by quarter: 24–26, 23–13, 19–13, 24–28
Pts: Abuqoura 25; Rebs: Abuqoura 10; Asts: Abuqoura 3		Pts: Pak M. 27; Rebs: Kim U. 8 Asts: Pak U. 4

International Sports Arena, Guangzhou
Referees: Yasser Abbas (QAT), Prakash Sandou (IND), Naohiko Uchihara (JPN)

17 November
19:15

North Korea	62–98	China
Scoring by quarter: 15–25, 9–21, 21–28, 17–24
Pts: Pak U. 19; Rebs: Sin 8 Asts: O J.H., An, Sin 2		Pts: Wang Z. 14; Rebs: Li 9 Asts: Zhang B. 5

International Sports Arena, Guangzhou
Referees: Borys Shulga (UKR), Wu Ying-wei (TPE), Prakash Sandou (IND)

17 November
19:15

Uzbekistan	65–67	Mongolia
Scoring by quarter: 15–18, 13–18, 14–18, 23–13
Pts: Denisov 17; Rebs: Sharafutdinov 9 Asts: Pereverzev 4		Pts: Mönkhbold 17; Rebs: Sainbayar 8 Asts: Sainbayar 4

Ying Tung Gymnasium, Guangzhou
Referees: Naohiko Uchihara (JPN), Amir Hossein Safarzadeh (IRI), Ramesh Kumar (IND)

17 November
21:30

South Korea	95–49	Jordan
Scoring by quarter: 28–16, 25–12, 20–12, 22–9
Pts: Kim J., Lee S. 14; Rebs: Oh 8 Asts: Park 7		Pts: Hadrab 19; Rebs: Zaghab 6 Asts: five players 1

International Sports Arena, Guangzhou
Referees: Eddie Viator (FRA), Yasser Abbas (QAT), Ferdinand Pascual (PHI)

19 November
19:15

China	96–31	Uzbekistan
Scoring by quarter: 26–15, 22–4, 29–10, 19–2
Pts: Wang S. 20; Rebs: Zhang Z. 11; Asts: Zhang Q., Wang Z. 5		Pts: Juginisov 13; Rebs: Sharafutdinov 6 Asts: Pereverzev 2

International Sports Arena, Guangzhou
Referees: Lau Cheuk Fai (HKG), Naohiko Uchihara (JPN), Yasser Abbas (QAT)

19 November
19:15

Jordan	79–64	Mongolia
Scoring by quarter: 17–14, 18–9, 19–25, 25–16
Pts: Zaghab 17; Rebs: Zaghab 19; Asts: Abdeen 6		Pts: Otgonmönkh, Sanchir 12; Rebs: Mönkhbold 6 Asts: Battör 4

Ying Tung Gymnasium, Guangzhou
Referees: Ferdinand Pascual (PHI), Teerapong Yodsint (THA), Prakash Sandou (IND)

19 November
21:30

North Korea	66–96	South Korea
Scoring by quarter: 12–27, 18–28, 15–25, 21–16
Pts: Pak U. 20; Rebs: Pak U., Kim U. 3 Asts: Pak U. 4		Pts: Lee S. 23; Rebs: Lee S. 7 Asts: Yang H., Kim S. 3

International Sports Arena, Guangzhou
Referees: Pablo Estévez (ARG), Wu Ying-wei (TPE), Amir Hossein Safarzadeh (IRI)

21 November
19:15

South Korea	66–76	China
Scoring by quarter: 22–19, 13–19, 18–21, 13–17
Pts: Kim J. 18; Rebs: Yang H. 7 Asts: Yang D. 7		Pts: Sun 19; Rebs: Wang Z. 7 Asts: Sun 3

International Sports Arena, Guangzhou
Referees: Cristiano Maranho (BRA), Amir Hossein Safarzadeh (IRI), Ferdinand Pascual (PHI)

21 November
19:15

Mongolia	67–88	North Korea
Scoring by quarter: 18–24, 16–12, 15–24, 18–28
Pts: Sanchir 15; Rebs: Uuganbayar, Sedbazar 9 Asts: Battör 2		Pts: Pak M. 23; Rebs: Kye 7 Asts: Pak M. 5

Ying Tung Gymnasium, Guangzhou
Referees: Borys Shulga (UKR), Yasser Abbas (QAT), Ramesh Kumar (IND)

21 November
21:30

Uzbekistan	63–68 (OT)	Jordan
Scoring by quarter: 7–15, 15–20, 23–13, 12–9, Overtime: 6–11
Pts: Juginisov 14; Rebs: Juginisov 12; Asts: Denisov 5		Pts: Abuqoura 19; Rebs: Abuqoura 10; Asts: Abdeen 4

International Sports Arena, Guangzhou
Referees: Wu Ying-wei (TPE), Naohiko Uchihara (JPN), Teerapong Yodsint (THA)

22 November
19:15

China	101–53	Jordan
Scoring by quarter: 26–8, 21–7, 28–17, 26–21
Pts: Zhang Q. 31; Rebs: Tang 12; Asts: Zhang B. 6		Pts: Zaghab 19; Rebs: Zaghab 8 Asts: Abuqoura, Abdeen 2

International Sports Arena, Guangzhou
Referees: Eddie Viator (FRA), Prakash Sandou (IND), Ferdinand Pascual (PHI)

22 November
19:15

North Korea	81–70	Uzbekistan
Scoring by quarter: 17–11, 19–20, 14–9, 31–30
Pts: Pak U. 21; Rebs: Kim U. 7 Asts: Sin 5		Pts: Juginisov 25; Rebs: Nuraliev 10; Asts: Nuraliev, Denisov, Pereverzev 2

Ying Tung Gymnasium, Guangzhou
Referees: Fong Kin Lung (HKG), Wu Ying-wei (TPE), Teerapong Yodsint (THA)

22 November
21:30

Mongolia	66–115	South Korea
Scoring by quarter: 18–29, 11–29, 17–29, 20–28
Pts: Uuganbayar 27; Rebs: Uuganbayar 10; Asts: Uuganbayar 3		Pts: Park, Oh 16; Rebs: Lee S. 9 Asts: Ham 9

International Sports Arena, Guangzhou
Referees: Amir Hossein Safarzadeh (IRI), Ramesh Kumar (IND), Naohiko Uchihara (JPN)

==== Group F ====
Pos	Team	Pld	W	L	PF	PA	PD	Pts	Qualification
1	Japan	5	4	1	352	317	+35	9 (Note: Head-to-head result: JPN 57–56 IRI.)	Quarterfinals
2	Iran	5	4	1	360	286	+74	9	Quarterfinals
3	Philippines	5	3	2	356	323	+33	8 (Note: Head-to-head result: PHI 90–68 QAT.)	Quarterfinals
4	Qatar	5	3	2	371	383	−12	8	Quarterfinals
5	Chinese Taipei	5	1	4	365	356	+9	6	
6	India	5	0	5	292	431	−139	5	

Source: Results
Notes:

16 November
19:15

Qatar	97–48	India
Scoring by quarter: 22–9, 32–11, 21–18, 22–10
Pts: Ngombo 19; Rebs: Ngombo, Ahmad, Ndour 7 Asts: four players 3		Pts: Koroth 24; Rebs: J. Singh 6 Asts: Bhriguvanshi 4

Huangpu Gymnasium, Guangzhou
Referees: Eddie Viator (FRA), Yun Jong-hyun (KOR), Song Xiaojing (CHN)

16 November
21:30

Iran	65–48	Philippines
Scoring by quarter: 17–10, 18–10, 12–10, 18–18
Pts: Sohrabnejad 11; Rebs: Kardoust 9 Asts: Davoudi, Sahakian 3		Pts: Tiu 14; Rebs: Williams 13; Asts: Barroca 2

Huangpu Gymnasium, Guangzhou
Referees: Borys Shulga (UKR), Kim Young-woo (KOR), Song Yanping (CHN)

16 November
21:30

Japan	63–57	Chinese Taipei
Scoring by quarter: 7–14, 17–9, 18–17, 21–17
Pts: J. Takeuchi 15; Rebs: K. Takeuchi, J. Takeuchi 13; Asts: Sakurai 2		Pts: Tien, Lin 15; Rebs: Wu 13; Asts: Lee 3

Ying Tung Gymnasium, Guangzhou
Referees: Cristiano Maranho (BRA), Pak Jong-sik (PRK), Ravshan Ganiev (UZB)

17 November
19:15

Philippines	90–68	Qatar
Scoring by quarter: 23–14, 26–14, 19–18, 22–22
Pts: Casio 22; Rebs: Williams 9 Asts: Casio 5		Pts: Ngombo 18; Rebs: Ahmad 8 Asts: four players 1

Huangpu Gymnasium, Guangzhou
Referees: Cristiano Maranho (BRA), Andy Cheung (HKG), Zheng Jun (CHN)

17 November
21:30

Japan	57–56	Iran
Scoring by quarter: 17–19, 11–12, 15–16, 14–9
Pts: Ishizaki 13; Rebs: J. Takeuchi 10; Asts: Tabuse 4		Pts: Kamrani 15; Rebs: Sahakian 10; Asts: Kamrani, Afagh 2

Huangpu Gymnasium, Guangzhou
Referees: Pablo Estévez (ARG), Lau Cheuk Fai (HKG), Jiang Zhiyuan (CHN)

17 November
21:30

Chinese Taipei	93–66	India
Scoring by quarter: 25–21, 22–6, 25–19, 21–20
Pts: Lin 23; Rebs: Lee, Lin 5 Asts: Lee 10		Pts: J. Singh 22; Rebs: Rai, J. Singh 6 Asts: Bhriguvanshi 4

Ying Tung Gymnasium, Guangzhou
Referees: Ravshan Ganiev (UZB), Yun Jong-hyun (KOR), Duan Zhu (CHN)

19 November
19:15

Qatar	72–70	Chinese Taipei
Scoring by quarter: 20–14, 14–12, 16–23, 22–21
Pts: Ngombo 23; Rebs: Ismail 12; Asts: Ngombo, Abdulrahman, Musa 2		Pts: Lu 23; Rebs: Tien, Lin 6 Asts: Lee, Tien 4

Huangpu Gymnasium, Guangzhou
Referees: Borys Shulga (UKR), Yun Jong-hyun (KOR), Yang Maogong (CHN)

19 November
21:30

Philippines	58–60	Japan
Scoring by quarter: 14–9, 15–21, 14–18, 15–12
Pts: Lassiter 13; Rebs: Williams 12; Asts: Barroca 3		Pts: Ishizaki 16; Rebs: K. Takeuchi 11; Asts: Tabuse 4

Huangpu Gymnasium, Guangzhou
Referees: Eddie Viator (FRA), Ravshan Ganiev (UZB), Wang Xiaochun (CHN)

19 November
21:30

Iran	78–63	India
Scoring by quarter: 20–14, 24–15, 23–19, 11–15
Pts: Afagh 27; Rebs: Sohrabnejad 8 Asts: Kamrani 4		Pts: J. Singh 24; Rebs: Bhriguvanshi 8 Asts: Bhriguvanshi 4

Ying Tung Gymnasium, Guangzhou
Referees: Andy Cheung (HKG), Kim Young-woo (KOR), Wang Mei (CHN)

21 November
19:15

Japan	87–88	Qatar
Scoring by quarter: 26–21, 23–24, 20–22, 18–21
Pts: Kinoshita 23; Rebs: K. Takeuchi 7 Asts: Tabuse 4		Pts: Ngombo 33; Rebs: Ahmad 10; Asts: Ngombo 3

Huangpu Gymnasium, Guangzhou
Referees: Pablo Estévez (ARG), Andy Cheung (HKG), Zheng Jun (CHN)

21 November
21:30

Chinese Taipei	72–73	Iran
Scoring by quarter: 14–22, 19–14, 21–17, 18–20
Pts: Lin 22; Rebs: Wu, Lin 4 Asts: Lee, Lin, Hung 3		Pts: Kardoust 22; Rebs: Kardoust 16; Asts: Kamrani 4

Huangpu Gymnasium, Guangzhou
Referees: Eddie Viator (FRA), Song Yanping (CHN), Ravshan Ganiev (UZB)

21 November
21:30

India	57–78	Philippines
Scoring by quarter: 14–21, 16–10, 11–32, 16–15
Pts: J. Singh 14; Rebs: Koroth 7 Asts: five players 1		Pts: Casio 18; Rebs: Taulava 9 Asts: Casio, Baracael, Williams 3

Ying Tung Gymnasium, Guangzhou
Referees: Jiang Zhiyuan (CHN), Lau Cheuk Fai (HKG), Yun Jong-hyun (KOR)

22 November
19:15

Qatar	46–88	Iran
Scoring by quarter: 10–27, 16–24, 10–16, 10–21
Pts: Ismail 18; Rebs: Ismail 6 Asts: Musa 2		Pts: Afagh 33; Rebs: Kardoust 11; Asts: Kamrani 5

Huangpu Gymnasium, Guangzhou
Referees: Borys Shulga (UKR), Lau Cheuk Fai (HKG), Wang Xiaochun (CHN)

22 November
21:30

India	58–85	Japan
Scoring by quarter: 21–25, 11–18, 14–14, 12–28
Pts: Bhriguvanshi 15; Rebs: Bhriguvanshi 12; Asts: Bhriguvanshi 5		Pts: Kinoshita 13; Rebs: Ito 12; Asts: Kinoshita 4

Huangpu Gymnasium, Guangzhou
Referees: Cristiano Maranho (BRA), Pak Jong-sik (PRK), Duan Zhu (CHN)

22 November
21:30

Philippines	82–73	Chinese Taipei
Scoring by quarter: 20–21, 22–19, 22–14, 18–19
Pts: Taulava, Lassiter 18; Rebs: Williams 13; Asts: Casio 4		Pts: Lin 21; Rebs: Lee 9 Asts: Wu 3

Ying Tung Gymnasium, Guangzhou
Referees: Pablo Estévez (ARG), Wang Mei (CHN), Mohammad Al-Amiri (KUW)

=== Final round ===
Quarterfinals
24 November
South Korea	74
Philippines	66
24 November
Japan	92
North Korea	75
24 November
Iran	67
Jordan	43
24 November
China	71
Qatar	66

Semifinals
25 November
South Korea	55
Japan	51
25 November
Iran	65
China	68

Gold medal game
26 November
South Korea	71
China	77
Bronze medal game
26 November
Japan	66
Iran	74

Placings 5th–8th
25 November
Philippines	96
North Korea	69
25 November
Jordan	52
Qatar	60

Placings 5th–6th
26 November
Philippines	71
Qatar	81
Placings 7th–8th
26 November
North Korea	74
Jordan	79

==== Quarterfinals ====
24 November
13:15

South Korea	74–66	Philippines
Scoring by quarter: 21–19, 23–17, 17–15, 13–15
Pts: Oh 19; Rebs: Oh 9 Asts: four players 3		Pts: Taulava 23; Rebs: Williams 8 Asts: Casio 4

Huangpu Gymnasium, Guangzhou
Referees: Cristiano Maranho (BRA), Andy Cheung (HKG), Song Xiaojing (CHN)

24 November
15:30

Japan	92–75	North Korea
Scoring by quarter: 24–16, 26–14, 18–17, 24–28
Pts: Ishizaki, Kinoshita 16; Rebs: K. Takeuchi 9 Asts: Sakurai, Ishizaki 3		Pts: Sin 22; Rebs: Pak M., Sin, Kye 6 Asts: Kim U. 4

Huangpu Gymnasium, Guangzhou
Referees: Eddie Viator (FRA), Ravshan Ganiev (UZB), Yang Maogong (CHN)

24 November
19:15

Iran	67–43	Jordan
Scoring by quarter: 20–11, 12–6, 16–16, 19–10
Pts: Afagh 17; Rebs: Kardoust 15; Asts: Kamrani 3		Pts: Abuqoura 11; Rebs: Abuqoura 8 Asts: four players 1

Huangpu Gymnasium, Guangzhou
Referees: Borys Shulga (UKR), Wu Ying-wei (TPE), Ramesh Kumar (IND)

24 November
21:30

China	71–66	Qatar
Scoring by quarter: 20–16, 16–9, 19–22, 16–19
Pts: Wang Z. 18; Rebs: Wang Z. 9 Asts: Liu 6		Pts: Ngombo 24; Rebs: Ismail 17; Asts: Ismail 2

Huangpu Gymnasium, Guangzhou
Referees: Pablo Estévez (ARG), Teerapong Yodsint (THA), Mohammad Al-Amiri (KUW)

==== Placings 5th–8th ====
25 November
14:15

Philippines	96–69	North Korea
Scoring by quarter: 28–22, 26–15, 22–18, 20–14
Pts: Slaughter, Baracael 18; Rebs: Slaughter 13; Asts: Lutz 6		Pts: Pak M. 17; Rebs: Sin, Kim U. 6 Asts: Kye 5

Ying Tung Gymnasium, Guangzhou
Referees: Lau Cheuk Fai (HKG), Amir Hossein Safarzadeh (IRI), Prakash Sandou (IND)

25 November
16:30

Jordan	52–60	Qatar
Scoring by quarter: 21–16, 10–17, 13–9, 8–18
Pts: Al-Sharif 11; Rebs: Abuqoura 7 Asts: Abuqoura 7		Pts: Suliman 14; Rebs: Ahmad 7 Asts: Musa 3

Ying Tung Gymnasium, Guangzhou
Referees: Eddie Viator (FRA), Naohiko Uchihara (JPN), Wang Mei (CHN)

==== Semifinals ====
25 November
13:15

South Korea	55–51	Japan
Scoring by quarter: 9–14, 18–12, 19–12, 9–13
Pts: Kim J. 13; Rebs: Kim J. 9 Asts: Yang D. 4		Pts: K. Takeuchi 16; Rebs: K. Takeuchi 11; Asts: Hirose, Tabuse 4

International Sports Arena, Guangzhou
Referees: Borys Shulga (UKR), Yasser Abbas (QAT), Mohammad Al-Amiri (KUW)

25 November
15:30

Iran	65–68	China
Scoring by quarter: 12–8, 16–21, 19–19, 18–20
Pts: Kamrani 19; Rebs: Kardoust 9 Asts: Davoudi, Sahakian 2		Pts: Wang S. 20; Rebs: Wang Z. 9 Asts: Wang Z. 2

International Sports Arena, Guangzhou
Referees: Cristiano Maranho (BRA), Ferdinand Pascual (PHI), Ravshan Ganiev (UZB)

==== Placings 7th–8th ====
26 November
14:15

North Korea	74–79	Jordan
Scoring by quarter: 19–23, 7–20, 29–14, 19–22
Pts: Sin 18; Rebs: Pak U. 6 Asts: Kye 7		Pts: Abuqoura 20; Rebs: Abuqoura 13; Asts: Al-Sharif, Abuqoura 4

Ying Tung Gymnasium, Guangzhou
Referees: Ferdinand Pascual (PHI), Fong Kin Lung (HKG), Song Yanping (CHN)

==== Placings 5th–6th ====
26 November
16:30

Philippines	71–81	Qatar
Scoring by quarter: 17–17, 22–19, 25–24, 7–21
Pts: Williams 20; Rebs: Taulava 19; Asts: Casio 8		Pts: Ngombo 25; Rebs: Ngombo 12; Asts: Abdulrahman, Suliman, Ahmad 2

Ying Tung Gymnasium, Guangzhou
Referees: Naohiko Uchihara (JPN), Zheng Jun (CHN), Wu Ying-wei (TPE)

==== Bronze medal game ====
26 November
16:45

Japan	66–74	Iran
Scoring by quarter: 24–26, 12–17, 14–16, 16–15
Pts: Ishizaki 17; Rebs: K. Takeuchi 9 Asts: Tabuse 4		Pts: Afagh 27; Rebs: Sohrabnejad 8 Asts: Kamrani 6

International Sports Arena, Guangzhou
Referees: Eddie Viator (FRA), Prakash Sandou (IND), Yang Maogong (CHN)

==== Gold medal game ====
26 November
19:00

South Korea	71–77	China
Scoring by quarter: 21–27, 16–16, 19–21, 15–13
Pts: Yang D. 17; Rebs: Kim J., Yang H., Lee S. 4 Asts: Yang D., Yang H. 4		Pts: Wang Z. 20; Rebs: Ding 8 Asts: Sun 4

International Sports Arena, Guangzhou
Referees: Pablo Estévez (ARG), Cristiano Maranho (BRA), Borys Shulga (UKR)

== Final standing ==
Rank	Team	Pld	W	L
1st place, gold medalist(s)	China	8	8	0
2nd place, silver medalist(s)	South Korea	8	6	2
3rd place, bronze medalist(s)	Iran	8	6	2
4	Japan	8	5	3
5	Qatar	8	5	3
6	Philippines	9	5	4
7	Jordan	8	4	4
8	North Korea	9	3	6
9	Chinese Taipei	5	1	4
10	Mongolia	6	2	4
11	Uzbekistan	5	0	5
12	India	6	1	5
13	Turkmenistan	1	0	1
14	Afghanistan	1	0	1
15	Hong Kong	1	0	1
16	Athletes from Kuwait	1	0	1
