= 2013 FIBA Asia Championship Group F =

Group F of the 2013 FIBA Asia Championship was to take place from 5 to 7 August 2013. This is the Second round of the 2013 FIBA Asia Championship. The four teams with the best record advance to 2013 FIBA Asia Championship final round.

All games will be played at the Mall of Asia Arena in Pasay, Philippines. The competing teams are top three teams in Group C and Group D.

Group C

| Team | Pld | W | L | PF | PA | PD | Pts |
|---|---|---|---|---|---|---|---|
| Iran | 3 | 3 | 0 | 261 | 141 | +120 | 6 |
| South Korea | 3 | 2 | 1 | 208 | 193 | +15 | 5 |
| China | 3 | 1 | 2 | 223 | 155 | +68 | 4 |
| Malaysia | 3 | 0 | 3 | 105 | 308 | −203 | 3 |

Group D

| Team | Pld | W | L | PF | PA | PD | Pts |
|---|---|---|---|---|---|---|---|
| Kazakhstan | 3 | 3 | 0 | 240 | 210 | +30 | 6 |
| Bahrain | 3 | 2 | 1 | 244 | 221 | +23 | 5 |
| India | 3 | 1 | 2 | 236 | 227 | +9 | 4 |
| Thailand | 3 | 0 | 3 | 194 | 256 | −62 | 3 |

== Standings ==
| Qualified for the Final Round |
| Relegated to 9th–12th Classification |

The results and the points of the matches between the same teams that were already played during the preliminary round shall be taken into account for the second round.

| Team | Pld | W | L | PF | PA | PD | Pts |
|---|---|---|---|---|---|---|---|
| Iran | 5 | 5 | 0 | 408 | 283 | +125 | 10 |
| South Korea | 5 | 4 | 1 | 390 | 287 | +103 | 9 |
| China | 5 | 3 | 2 | 350 | 311 | +39 | 8 |
| Kazakhstan | 5 | 2 | 3 | 326 | 372 | −46 | 7 |
| Bahrain | 5 | 1 | 4 | 331 | 418 | −87 | 6 |
| India | 5 | 0 | 5 | 304 | 438 | −134 | 5 |

All times are local (UTC+8).

== August 5 ==
=== Iran vs. India ===
5 August 2013
12:45

Report

| Iran | 102–58 | India |
Scoring by quarter: 25–12, 26–10, 27–17, 24–19
| Pts: Afagh 16; Rebs: Sohrabnejad, Haddadi 7 Asts: Kamrani 5 | | Pts: Bhriguvanshi 15; Rebs: Al. Singh 7 Asts: Bhriguvanshi 7 |

Mall of Asia Arena, Pasay
Referees: Cheung Kwok Shun Andy (HKG), Ferdinand Pascual (PHI), Hatim Alharbi (KSA)

Iran
| # | Player | Min | FG | | 3FG | | FT | | REB | | | AST | PF | TO | STL | BS | Pts |
| # | Player | Min | M/A | % | M/A | % | M/A | % | OFF | DEF | TOT | AST | PF | TO | STL | BS | Pts |
|---|---|---|---|---|---|---|---|---|---|---|---|---|---|---|---|---|---|
| 4 | Mohammad Jamshidi | 22 | 1/3 | 33.3 | 0/2 | 0 | 4/4 | 100 | 2 | 1 | 3 | 3 | 0 | 0 | 0 | 0 | 7 |
| 5 | Aren Davoudi | 13 | 2/3 | 66.7 | 0/0 | 0 | 1/2 | 50 | 0 | 0 | 0 | 1 | 4 | 0 | 0 | 0 | 7 |
| 6 | Javad Davari | 18 | 2/4 | 50 | 0/1 | 0 | 2/2 | 100 | 1 | 1 | 2 | 1 | 2 | 1 | 1 | 0 | 8 |
| 7 | Mehdi Kamrani | 16 | 3/8 | 37.5 | 2/4 | 50 | 1/2 | 50 | 1 | 1 | 2 | 5 | 0 | 1 | 1 | 0 | 8 |
| 8 | Saman Veisi | 11 | 1/2 | 50 | 1/1 | 100 | 0/0 | 0 | 0 | 2 | 2 | 4 | 2 | 2 | 0 | 0 | 2 |
| 9 | Oshin Sahakian | 14 | 0/0 | 0 | 0/0 | 0 | 0/0 | 0 | 0 | 3 | 3 | 0 | 2 | 1 | 0 | 0 | 0 |
| 10 | Hamed Afagh | 22 | 6/10 | 60 | 2/3 | 66.7 | 0/0 | 0 | 1 | 2 | 3 | 3 | 2 | 1 | 0 | 0 | 16 |
| 11 | Hamed Sohrabnejad | 20 | 6/10 | 60 | 5/8 | 62.5 | 1/2 | 50 | 3 | 4 | 7 | 0 | 2 | 2 | 1 | 0 | 14 |
| 12 | Asghar Kardoust | 20 | 4/5 | 80 | 4/5 | 80 | 4/5 | 80 | 1 | 5 | 6 | 0 | 2 | 3 | 0 | 0 | 12 |
| 13 | Rouzbeh Arghavan | 9 | 0/1 | 0 | 0/1 | 0 | 1/2 | 50 | 2 | 2 | 4 | 1 | 1 | 2 | 0 | 1 | 1 |
| 14 | Samad Nikkhah Bahrami | 18 | 6/12 | 50 | 4/8 | 50 | 1/1 | 100 | 0 | 2 | 2 | 3 | 2 | 2 | 1 | 0 | 15 |
| 15 | Hamed Haddadi | 16 | 4/4 | 100 | 3/3 | 100 | 3/3 | 100 | 0 | 7 | 7 | 1 | 4 | 1 | 1 | 4 | 12 |
| Totals | | 200 | 35/62 | 56.5 | 21/36 | 58.3 | 18/23 | 78.3 | 13 | 34 | 47 | 22 | 24 | 16 | 5 | 5 | 102 |

India
| # | Player | Min | FG | | 3FG | | FT | | REB | | | AST | PF | TO | STL | BS | Pts |
| # | Player | Min | M/A | % | M/A | % | M/A | % | OFF | DEF | TOT | AST | PF | TO | STL | BS | Pts |
|---|---|---|---|---|---|---|---|---|---|---|---|---|---|---|---|---|---|
| 4 | Sambhaji Kadam | Did not play | | | | | | | | | | | | | | | |
| 5 | Narender Kumar Grewal | 28 | 4/10 | 40 | 4/8 | 50 | 2/3 | 66.7 | 3 | 1 | 4 | 2 | 3 | 2 | 0 | 0 | 10 |
| 6 | Pratham Singh | 6 | 1/2 | 50 | 0/0 | 0 | 2/2 | 100 | 0 | 0 | 0 | 1 | 0 | 0 | 0 | 0 | 5 |
| 7 | Vinay Kaushik | 11 | 1/1 | 100 | 1/1 | 100 | 0/0 | 0 | 0 | 0 | 0 | 0 | 1 | 0 | 0 | 0 | 2 |
| 8 | Arjun Singh | 3 | 0/0 | 0 | 0/0 | 0 | 0/0 | 0 | 0 | 0 | 0 | 1 | 2 | 3 | 0 | 0 | 0 |
| 9 | Vishesh Bhriguvanshi | 30 | 3/17 | 17.6 | 3/12 | 25 | 9/13 | 69.2 | 1 | 2 | 3 | 7 | 4 | 1 | 0 | 0 | 15 |
| 10 | Amritpal Singh | 21 | 1/5 | 20 | 1/5 | 20 | 3/6 | 50 | 2 | 5 | 7 | 0 | 3 | 1 | 0 | 0 | 5 |
| 11 | Joginder Singh | 22 | 1/7 | 14.3 | 0/2 | 0 | 0/0 | 0 | 1 | 1 | 2 | 1 | 5 | 3 | 0 | 0 | 3 |
| 12 | Satnam Singh Bhamara | 8 | 0/0 | 0 | 0/0 | 0 | 0/0 | 0 | 0 | 0 | 0 | 0 | 2 | 1 | 1 | 1 | 0 |
| 13 | Amjyot Singh | 31 | 4/10 | 40 | 2/7 | 28.6 | 0/2 | 0 | 2 | 3 | 5 | 1 | 2 | 1 | 0 | 2 | 10 |
| 14 | Yadwinder Singh | 22 | 2/5 | 40 | 2/5 | 40 | 0/0 | 0 | 2 | 0 | 2 | 0 | 2 | 1 | 2 | 0 | 4 |
| 15 | Rikin Shantilal Pethani | 17 | 2/6 | 33.3 | 2/6 | 33.3 | 0/2 | 0 | 0 | 1 | 1 | 0 | 0 | 0 | 0 | 1 | 4 |
| Totals | | 200 | 19/63 | 30.2 | 15/46 | 32.6 | 16/28 | 57.1 | 14 | 15 | 29 | 13 | 24 | 14 | 3 | 4 | 58 |

=== Kazakhstan vs. China ===
5 August 2013
17:45

Report

| Kazakhstan | 67–73 | China |
Scoring by quarter: 12–24, 18–18, 16–8, 21–23
| Pts: Johnson 13; Rebs: Ponomarev 10; Asts: Johnson 6 | | Pts: Zhou P. 17; Rebs: Zhou P. 8 Asts: Wang S.P. 7 |

Mall of Asia Arena, Pasay
Referees: Toru Katayose (JPN), Mohd Naser Abu Rashed (JOR), Thongchai Thaweewutsophon (THA)

Kazakhstan
| # | Player | Min | FG | | 3FG | | FT | | REB | | | AST | PF | TO | STL | BS | Pts |
| # | Player | Min | M/A | % | M/A | % | M/A | % | OFF | DEF | TOT | AST | PF | TO | STL | BS | Pts |
|---|---|---|---|---|---|---|---|---|---|---|---|---|---|---|---|---|---|
| 4 | Timur Sultanov | 4 | 0/1 | 0 | 0/0 | 0 | 0/0 | 0 | 0 | 0 | 0 | 0 | 0 | 0 | 0 | 0 | 0 |
| 5 | Jerry Johnson | 35 | 5/12 | 41.7 | 5/7 | 71.4 | 3/4 | 75 | 3 | 0 | 3 | 6 | 2 | 3 | 0 | 0 | 13 |
| 6 | Rustam Murzagaliyev | 25 | 2/4 | 50 | 0/0 | 0 | 0/0 | 0 | 0 | 1 | 1 | 1 | 1 | 2 | 0 | 0 | 6 |
| 7 | Mikhail Yevstigneyev | 21 | 1/4 | 25 | 1/4 | 25 | 9/10 | 90 | 2 | 6 | 8 | 1 | 3 | 0 | 0 | 0 | 11 |
| 8 | Vitaliy Lapchenko | 21 | 4/8 | 50 | 3/6 | 50 | 0/0 | 0 | 0 | 5 | 5 | 0 | 2 | 0 | 0 | 1 | 9 |
| 9 | Nikolay Bazhini | 7 | 0/1 | 0 | 0/1 | 0 | 0/2 | 0 | 0 | 0 | 0 | 0 | 0 | 1 | 0 | 0 | 0 |
| 10 | Konstantin Dvirnyy | Did not play | | | | | | | | | | | | | | | |
| 11 | Anton Ponomarev | 22 | 3/6 | 50 | 3/4 | 75 | 0/0 | 0 | 5 | 5 | 10 | 2 | 3 | 0 | 0 | 0 | 6 |
| 12 | Dmitriy Klimov | 16 | 2/2 | 100 | 1/1 | 100 | 2/2 | 100 | 1 | 2 | 3 | 1 | 5 | 3 | 0 | 0 | 7 |
| 13 | Rustam Yargaliyev | 26 | 3/13 | 23.1 | 2/6 | 33.3 | 2/2 | 100 | 0 | 3 | 3 | 2 | 4 | 2 | 0 | 0 | 9 |
| 14 | Leonid Bondarovich | 8 | 3/4 | 75 | 3/4 | 75 | 0/0 | 0 | 1 | 3 | 4 | 0 | 5 | 1 | 0 | 1 | 6 |
| 15 | Alexander Zhigulin | 14 | 0/4 | 0 | 0/2 | 0 | 0/0 | 0 | 1 | 0 | 1 | 0 | 5 | 0 | 0 | 0 | 0 |
| Totals | | 200 | 23/59 | 39 | 18/35 | 51.4 | 16/20 | 80 | 13 | 27 | 40 | 13 | 30 | 13 | 0 | 2 | 67 |

China
| # | Player | Min | FG | | 3FG | | FT | | REB | | | AST | PF | TO | STL | BS | Pts |
| # | Player | Min | M/A | % | M/A | % | M/A | % | OFF | DEF | TOT | AST | PF | TO | STL | BS | Pts |
|---|---|---|---|---|---|---|---|---|---|---|---|---|---|---|---|---|---|
| 4 | Guo Ailun | 7 | 1/2 | 50 | 1/2 | 50 | 0/0 | 0 | 0 | 1 | 1 | 0 | 0 | 0 | 0 | 0 | 2 |
| 5 | Liu Xiaoyu | 2 | 0/0 | 0 | 0/0 | 0 | 0/0 | 0 | 0 | 0 | 0 | 0 | 0 | 0 | 0 | 0 | 0 |
| 6 | Chen Jianghua | 25 | 1/2 | 50 | 1/1 | 100 | 2/2 | 100 | 0 | 4 | 4 | 2 | 1 | 2 | 0 | 0 | 4 |
| 7 | Wang Shipeng | 33 | 3/8 | 37.5 | 1/2 | 50 | 1/1 | 100 | 0 | 3 | 3 | 7 | 2 | 0 | 1 | 0 | 9 |
| 8 | Zhu Fangyu | 29 | 5/11 | 45.5 | 2/7 | 28.6 | 2/2 | 100 | 2 | 2 | 4 | 1 | 4 | 3 | 0 | 0 | 15 |
| 9 | Sun Yue | 27 | 1/9 | 11.1 | 0/2 | 0 | 3/4 | 75 | 0 | 1 | 1 | 3 | 2 | 1 | 0 | 0 | 6 |
| 10 | Li Xiaoxu | 12 | 1/1 | 100 | 1/1 | 100 | 1/3 | 33.3 | 0 | 0 | 0 | 0 | 4 | 1 | 0 | 0 | 3 |
| 11 | Yi Jianlian | Did not play | | | | | | | | | | | | | | | |
| 12 | Zhang Bo | 7 | 0/1 | 0 | 0/1 | 0 | 1/2 | 50 | 1 | 1 | 2 | 0 | 1 | 1 | 0 | 0 | 1 |
| 13 | Wang Zhelin | 9 | 1/1 | 100 | 1/1 | 100 | 2/2 | 100 | 3 | 1 | 4 | 1 | 4 | 1 | 0 | 0 | 4 |
| 14 | Wang Zhizhi | 22 | 4/12 | 33.3 | 4/11 | 36.4 | 4/4 | 100 | 0 | 6 | 6 | 0 | 0 | 0 | 0 | 1 | 12 |
| 15 | Zhou Peng | 28 | 6/12 | 50 | 5/10 | 50 | 4/10 | 40 | 5 | 3 | 8 | 0 | 3 | 1 | 0 | 1 | 17 |
| Totals | | 200 | 23/59 | 39 | 16/38 | 42.1 | 20/30 | 66.7 | 11 | 24 | 35 | 14 | 21 | 10 | 1 | 2 | 73 |

=== Korea vs. Bahrain ===
5 August 2013
22:30

Report

| South Korea | 96–51 | Bahrain |
Scoring by quarter: 18–13, 24–13, 30–21, 24–4
| Pts: Kim T.S. 17; Rebs: Kim J.S. 9 Asts: Kim T.S. 7 | | Pts: Ismaeel 19; Rebs: Akber 5 Asts: Kawaid 2 |

Mall of Asia Arena, Pasay
Referees: Harja Jaladri (INA), Ricor Buaron (PHI), Yuji Hirahara (JPN)

South Korea
| # | Player | Min | FG | | 3FG | | FT | | REB | | | AST | PF | TO | STL | BS | Pts |
| # | Player | Min | M/A | % | M/A | % | M/A | % | OFF | DEF | TOT | AST | PF | TO | STL | BS | Pts |
|---|---|---|---|---|---|---|---|---|---|---|---|---|---|---|---|---|---|
| 4 | Kim Min-Goo | 17:50 | 5-10 | 50 | 2-7 | 29 | 0-0 | 0 | 0 | 1 | 1 | 3 | 1 | 2 | 1 | 0 | 12 |
| 5 | Kim Sun-Hyung | 20:00 | 6-9 | 67 | 0-2 | 0 | 2-2 | 100 | 2 | 1 | 3 | 4 | 2 | 1 | 0 | 3 | 14 |
| 6 | Yang Dong-Geun | 16:13 | 1-3 | 33 | 0-2 | 0 | 0-0 | 0 | 1 | 1 | 2 | 3 | 1 | 1 | 0 | 0 | 2 |
| 7 | Kim Tae-Sul | 20:00 | 5-6 | 83 | 2-2 | 100 | 5-5 | 100 | 0 | 1 | 1 | 7 | 1 | 4 | 0 | 3 | 17 |
| 8 | Moon Seong-Gon | 07:52 | 1-4 | 25 | 0-3 | 0 | 0-0 | 0 | 0 | 1 | 1 | 0 | 1 | 1 | 0 | 2 | 2 |
| 9 | Yun Ho-Young | 11:19 | 0-1 | 0 | 0-1 | 0 | 0-0 | 0 | 1 | 0 | 1 | 1 | 1 | 0 | 1 | 0 | 0 |
| 10 | Cho Sung-Min | 24:12 | 6-9 | 67 | 2-5 | 40 | 0-0 | 0 | 0 | 1 | 1 | 4 | 1 | 2 | 0 | 2 | 14 |
| 11 | Kim Joo-Sung | 25:48 | 3-6 | 50 | 0-0 | 0 | 5-6 | 83 | 4 | 5 | 9 | 2 | 3 | 0 | 0 | 3 | 11 |
| 12 | Kim Jong-Kyu | 16:47 | 1-2 | 50 | 0-0 | 0 | 3-4 | 75 | 2 | 5 | 7 | 1 | 3 | 0 | 1 | 1 | 5 |
| 13 | Choi Jun-Yong | 10:00 | 1-4 | 25 | 0-2 | 0 | 0-2 | 0 | 0 | 2 | 2 | 2 | 0 | 1 | 1 | 0 | 2 |
| 14 | Lee Seung-Jun | 12:47 | 2-3 | 67 | 0-0 | 0 | 0-2 | 0 | 0 | 4 | 4 | 0 | 0 | 0 | 1 | 2 | 4 |
| 15 | Lee Jong-Hyun | 17:07 | 5-7 | 71 | 0-0 | 0 | 3-3 | 100 | 2 | 2 | 4 | 1 | 1 | 0 | 4 | 1 | 13 |
| Totals | | | 36-64 | 56 | 6-24 | 25 | 18-24 | 75 | 12 | 24 | 36 | 28 | 15 | 12 | 9 | 17 | 96 |

Bahrain
| # | Player | Min | FG | | 3FG | | FT | | REB | | | AST | PF | TO | STL | BS | Pts |
| # | Player | Min | M/A | % | M/A | % | M/A | % | OFF | DEF | TOT | AST | PF | TO | STL | BS | Pts |
|---|---|---|---|---|---|---|---|---|---|---|---|---|---|---|---|---|---|
| 4 | Mohamed Ebrahim | 13:05 | 0-4 | 0 | 0-0 | 0 | 0-0 | 0 | 1 | 1 | 2 | 0 | 3 | 0 | 0 | 1 | 0 |
| 5 | Hussain Al-Tawash | Did not play | | | | | | | | | | | | | | | |
| 6 | Mohamed Kawaid | 26:57 | 1-7 | 14 | 1-2 | 50 | 0-0 | 0 | 0 | 3 | 3 | 2 | 4 | 1 | 1 | 1 | 3 |
| 7 | Bader Malabes | 25:04 | 2-7 | 29 | 0-1 | 0 | 0-0 | 0 | 0 | 0 | 0 | 1 | 2 | 1 | 0 | 1 | 4 |
| 8 | Ahmed Ismaeel | 28:59 | 6-10 | 60 | 3-5 | 60 | 4-6 | 67 | 1 | 2 | 3 | 1 | 4 | 0 | 1 | 2 | 19 |
| 9 | Mohamed Alderazi | 20:20 | 3-3 | 100 | 1-1 | 100 | 0-0 | 0 | 1 | 2 | 3 | 0 | 3 | 1 | 0 | 2 | 7 |
| 10 | Abdul-Rahman Mubarak | 20:00 | 2-4 | 50 | 2-3 | 67 | 0-0 | 0 | 0 | 0 | 0 | 0 | 7 | 0 | 0 | 4 | 6 |
| 11 | Subah Azzam | 15:52 | 1-2 | 50 | 0-0 | 0 | 4-6 | 67 | 1 | 1 | 2 | 0 | 1 | 0 | 1 | 4 | 6 |
| 12 | Chester Giles | Did not play | | | | | | | | | | | | | | | |
| 13 | Yunes Kawaid | 11:26 | 2-4 | 50 | 0-0 | 0 | 0-0 | 0 | 0 | 0 | 0 | 0 | 2 | 0 | 0 | 0 | 4 |
| 14 | Ahmed Akber | 29:20 | 0-3 | 0 | 0-0 | 0 | 2-2 | 100 | 0 | 5 | 5 | 0 | 1 | 0 | 1 | 4 | 2 |
| 15 | Ahmed Aman | 08:53 | 0-0 | 0 | 0-0 | 0 | 0-0 | 0 | 0 | 1 | 1 | 0 | 1 | 0 | 0 | 3 | 0 |
| Totals | | | 17-44 | 39 | 7-12 | 58 | 10-14 | 71 | 4 | 15 | 19 | 4 | 28 | 3 | 4 | 22 | 51 |

== August 6 ==
=== Bahrain vs. Iran ===
6 August 2013
12:45

Report

| Bahrain | 56–75 | Iran |
Scoring by quarter: 6–23, 21–7, 14–33, 15–12
| Pts: Al-Tawash 15; Rebs: Kawaid 5 Asts: Al-Tawash 3 | | Pts: Nikkhah 17; Rebs: Sahakian 10; Asts: Kamrani 11 |

Mall of Asia Arena, Pasay
Referees: Mohd Naser Abu Rashed (JOR), Jassim Abdullah (QAT), Chen Ying-Cheng (TPE)

Bahrain
| # | Player | Min | FG | | 3FG | | FT | | REB | | | AST | PF | TO | STL | BS | Pts |
| # | Player | Min | M/A | % | M/A | % | M/A | % | OFF | DEF | TOT | AST | PF | TO | STL | BS | Pts |
|---|---|---|---|---|---|---|---|---|---|---|---|---|---|---|---|---|---|
| 4 | Mohamed Ebrahim | Did not play | | | | | | | | | | | | | | | |
| 5 | Hussain Al-Tawash | 25:43 | 5-10 | 50 | 4-6 | 67 | 1-1 | 100 | 1 | 1 | 2 | 3 | 2 | 0 | 0 | 2 | 15 |
| 6 | Mohamed Kawaid | 18:37 | 2-6 | 33 | 0-2 | 0 | 0-0 | 0 | 0 | 3 | 3 | 1 | 1 | 0 | 0 | 1 | 4 |
| 7 | Bader Malabes | 17:19 | 3-10 | 30 | 1-5 | 20 | 0-0 | 0 | 0 | 1 | 1 | 2 | 1 | 0 | 0 | 0 | 7 |
| 8 | Ahmed Ismaeel | 12:56 | 1-4 | 25 | 1-2 | 50 | 0-0 | 0 | 0 | 3 | 3 | 1 | 1 | 1 | 0 | 0 | 3 |
| 9 | Mohamed Alderazi | 32:36 | 6-12 | 50 | 1-4 | 25 | 1-1 | 100 | 0 | 4 | 4 | 4 | 4 | 2 | 0 | 3 | 14 |
| 10 | Abdul-Rahman Mubarak | 02:41 | 1-2 | 50 | 0-1 | 0 | 0-0 | 0 | 0 | 0 | 0 | 0 | 0 | 1 | 0 | 0 | 2 |
| 11 | Subah Azzam | 23:39 | 0-5 | 0 | 0-2 | 0 | 0-0 | 0 | 1 | 3 | 4 | 0 | 1 | 1 | 0 | 1 | 0 |
| 12 | Chester Giles | Did not play | | | | | | | | | | | | | | | |
| 13 | Yunes Kawaid | 26:24 | 4-6 | 67 | 0-0 | 0 | 0-0 | 0 | 1 | 4 | 5 | 1 | 0 | 0 | 0 | 1 | 8 |
| 14 | Ahmed Akber | 22:02 | 0-2 | 0 | 0-0 | 0 | 0-0 | 0 | 2 | 1 | 3 | 0 | 1 | 1 | 3 | 4 | 0 |
| 15 | Ahmed Aman | 17:57 | 1-4 | 25 | 1-3 | 33 | 0-0 | 0 | 2 | 2 | 4 | 0 | 2 | 0 | 1 | 4 | 3 |
| Totals | | | 23-61 | 38 | 8-25 | 32 | 2-2 | 100 | 7 | 22 | 29 | 12 | 13 | 6 | 4 | 16 | 56 |

Iran
| # | Player | Min | FG | | 3FG | | FT | | REB | | | AST | PF | TO | STL | BS | Pts |
| # | Player | Min | M/A | % | M/A | % | M/A | % | OFF | DEF | TOT | AST | PF | TO | STL | BS | Pts |
|---|---|---|---|---|---|---|---|---|---|---|---|---|---|---|---|---|---|
| 4 | Mohammad Jamshidi | 13:02 | 0-3 | 0 | 0-3 | 0 | 0-2 | 0 | 0 | 1 | 1 | 0 | 2 | 0 | 0 | 2 | 0 |
| 5 | Aren Davoudi | 14:14 | 0-2 | 0 | 0-2 | 0 | 2-2 | 100 | 1 | 0 | 1 | 0 | 0 | 0 | 0 | 2 | 2 |
| 6 | Javad Davari | 17:18 | 0-3 | 0 | 0-3 | 0 | 0-0 | 0 | 1 | 0 | 1 | 1 | 1 | 0 | 0 | 1 | 0 |
| 7 | Mehdi Kamrani | 17:28 | 4-6 | 67 | 1-2 | 50 | 0-0 | 0 | 1 | 1 | 2 | 11 | 1 | 0 | 0 | 2 | 9 |
| 8 | Saman Veisi | 18:40 | 2-9 | 22 | 0-2 | 0 | 1-2 | 50 | 2 | 4 | 6 | 0 | 3 | 0 | 0 | 0 | 5 |
| 9 | Oshin Sahakian | 28:58 | 2-3 | 67 | 0-1 | 0 | 0-0 | 0 | 0 | 10 | 10 | 3 | 1 | 0 | 0 | 2 | 4 |
| 10 | Hamed Afagh | 16:33 | 4-6 | 67 | 4-5 | 80 | 3-3 | 100 | 1 | 1 | 2 | 3 | 0 | 2 | 0 | 0 | 15 |
| 11 | Hamed Sohrabnejad | 11:01 | 0-3 | 0 | 0-2 | 0 | 0-2 | 0 | 0 | 1 | 1 | 0 | 1 | 0 | 0 | 0 | 0 |
| 12 | Asghar Kardoust | 17:02 | 3-6 | 50 | 0-0 | 0 | 6-8 | 75 | 3 | 1 | 4 | 1 | 0 | 0 | 0 | 0 | 12 |
| 13 | Rouzbeh Arghavan | 05:28 | 1-2 | 50 | 0-0 | 0 | 0-0 | 0 | 1 | 0 | 1 | 0 | 0 | 0 | 0 | 0 | 2 |
| 14 | Samad Nikkhah Bahrami | 22:41 | 7-11 | 64 | 3-3 | 100 | 0-0 | 0 | 0 | 6 | 6 | 5 | 2 | 2 | 0 | 0 | 17 |
| 15 | Hamed Haddadi | 17:28 | 4-6 | 67 | 0-0 | 0 | 1-2 | 50 | 3 | 5 | 8 | 0 | 1 | 0 | 2 | 2 | 9 |
| Totals | | | 27-60 | 45 | 8-23 | 35 | 13-21 | 62 | 13 | 30 | 43 | 24 | 12 | 4 | 2 | 11 | 75 |

=== China vs. India ===
6 August 2013
17:45

Report

| China | 79–45 | India |
Scoring by quarter: 22–14, 23–6, 15–9, 19–16
| Pts: Wang Z.Z. 18; Rebs: Wang Z.Z. 9 Asts: Zhang 5 | | Pts: At. Singh 16; Rebs: Bhriguvanshi 6 Asts: At. Singh 3 |

Mall of Asia Arena, Pasay
Referees: Ferdinand Pascual (PHI), Ricor Buaron (PHI), Yuji Hirahara (JPN)

China
| # | Player | Min | FG | | 3FG | | FT | | REB | | | AST | PF | TO | STL | BS | Pts |
| # | Player | Min | M/A | % | M/A | % | M/A | % | OFF | DEF | TOT | AST | PF | TO | STL | BS | Pts |
|---|---|---|---|---|---|---|---|---|---|---|---|---|---|---|---|---|---|
| 4 | Guo Ailun | 20:11 | 5-6 | 83 | 1-1 | 100 | 5-5 | 100 | 0 | 1 | 1 | 2 | 1 | 0 | 0 | 3 | 16 |
| 5 | Liu Xiaoyu | Did not play | | | | | | | | | | | | | | | |
| 6 | Chen Jianghua | 18:23 | 0-1 | 0 | 0-1 | 0 | 0-0 | 0 | 0 | 2 | 2 | 1 | 1 | 0 | 0 | 0 | 0 |
| 7 | Wang Shipeng | 19:59 | 1-4 | 25 | 1-4 | 25 | 0-0 | 0 | 1 | 4 | 5 | 1 | 1 | 0 | 0 | 2 | 3 |
| 8 | Zhu Fangyu | 18:42 | 2-5 | 40 | 2-5 | 40 | 1-2 | 50 | 1 | 2 | 3 | 0 | 0 | 0 | 1 | 3 | 7 |
| 9 | Sun Yue | 21:30 | 1-6 | 17 | 0-3 | 0 | 2-2 | 100 | 1 | 1 | 2 | 3 | 3 | 1 | 0 | 3 | 4 |
| 10 | Li Xiaoxu | 24:17 | 2-5 | 40 | 0-0 | 0 | 1-2 | 50 | 3 | 5 | 8 | 0 | 1 | 0 | 0 | 2 | 5 |
| 11 | Yi Jianlian | Did not play | | | | | | | | | | | | | | | |
| 12 | Zhang Bo | 19:54 | 1-7 | 14 | 0-4 | 0 | 2-2 | 100 | 0 | 2 | 2 | 5 | 1 | 1 | 0 | 1 | 4 |
| 13 | Wang Zhelin | 26:54 | 6-8 | 75 | 0-0 | 0 | 6-10 | 60 | 3 | 6 | 9 | 1 | 1 | 3 | 0 | 4 | 18 |
| 14 | Wang Zhizhi | 09:12 | 5-9 | 56 | 1-1 | 100 | 2-4 | 50 | 2 | 3 | 5 | 1 | 0 | 0 | 1 | 0 | 13 |
| 15 | Zhou Peng | 20:53 | 3-8 | 38 | 2-4 | 50 | 1-4 | 25 | 0 | 2 | 2 | 2 | 0 | 1 | 1 | 1 | 9 |
| Totals | | | 26-59 | 44 | 7-23 | 30 | 20-31 | 65 | 11 | 28 | 39 | 16 | 9 | 6 | 3 | 19 | 79 |

India
| # | Player | Min | FG | | 3FG | | FT | | REB | | | AST | PF | TO | STL | BS | Pts |
| # | Player | Min | M/A | % | M/A | % | M/A | % | OFF | DEF | TOT | AST | PF | TO | STL | BS | Pts |
|---|---|---|---|---|---|---|---|---|---|---|---|---|---|---|---|---|---|
| 4 | Sambhaji Kadam | Did not play | | | | | | | | | | | | | | | |
| 5 | Narender Kumar Grewal | 23:25 | 4-11 | 36 | 1-1 | 100 | 0-0 | 0 | 0 | 0 | 0 | 3 | 1 | 0 | 0 | 2 | 9 |
| 6 | Pratham Singh | 12:00 | 0-4 | 0 | 0-2 | 0 | 0-0 | 0 | 1 | 1 | 2 | 0 | 0 | 0 | 0 | 0 | 0 |
| 7 | Vinay Kaushik | 02:27 | 0-0 | 0 | 0-0 | 0 | 0-0 | 0 | 0 | 0 | 0 | 0 | 1 | 0 | 0 | 2 | 0 |
| 8 | Arjun Singh | Did not play | | | | | | | | | | | | | | | |
| 9 | Vishesh Bhriguvanshi | 34:49 | 1-3 | 33 | 0-2 | 0 | 0-0 | 0 | 0 | 6 | 6 | 1 | 6 | 1 | 1 | 2 | 2 |
| 10 | Amritpal Singh | 21:28 | 3-9 | 33 | 0-0 | 0 | 3-4 | 75 | 0 | 5 | 5 | 0 | 3 | 1 | 0 | 5 | 9 |
| 11 | Joginder Singh | 21:39 | 0-3 | 0 | 0-3 | 0 | 0-0 | 0 | 1 | 1 | 2 | 1 | 0 | 1 | 0 | 1 | 0 |
| 12 | Satnam Singh Bhamara | 08:13 | 1-3 | 33 | 0-0 | 0 | 0-0 | 0 | 0 | 1 | 1 | 0 | 1 | 0 | 0 | 2 | 2 |
| 13 | Amjyot Singh | 37:43 | 5-9 | 56 | 0-2 | 0 | 6-9 | 67 | 1 | 3 | 4 | 3 | 3 | 0 | 1 | 2 | 16 |
| 14 | Yadwinder Singh | 25:06 | 1-3 | 33 | 0-1 | 0 | 0-0 | 0 | 1 | 5 | 6 | 0 | 2 | 0 | 0 | 3 | 2 |
| 15 | Rikin Shantilal Pethani | 13:05 | 2-5 | 40 | 0-0 | 0 | 1-1 | 100 | 0 | 5 | 5 | 0 | 3 | 0 | 0 | 5 | 5 |
| Totals | | | 17-51 | 33 | 1-11 | 9 | 10-14 | 71 | 4 | 27 | 31 | 8 | 20 | 3 | 2 | 24 | 45 |

=== Kazakhstan vs. Korea ===
6 August 2013
22:30

Report

| Kazakhstan | 47–71 | South Korea |
Scoring by quarter: 14–16, 13–22, 9–19, 11–14
| Pts: Johnson 15; Rebs: Ponomarev 6 Asts: Johnson 2 | | Pts: Kim S.H., Kim M.G. 14; Rebs: Kim M.G., Kim J.S. 6 Asts: Kim T.S. 4 |

Mall of Asia Arena, Pasay
Referees: Mohammad Alamiri (KUW), Hatim Hamed Alhabri (KSA), Toru Katayose (JPN)

Kazakhstan
| # | Player | Min | FG | | 3FG | | FT | | REB | | | AST | PF | TO | STL | BS | Pts |
| # | Player | Min | M/A | % | M/A | % | M/A | % | OFF | DEF | TOT | AST | PF | TO | STL | BS | Pts |
|---|---|---|---|---|---|---|---|---|---|---|---|---|---|---|---|---|---|
| 4 | Timur Sultanov | 21:04 | 3-6 | 50 | 3-4 | 75 | 0-0 | 0 | 0 | 1 | 1 | 1 | 2 | 1 | 0 | 0 | 9 |
| 5 | Jerry Johnson | 22:39 | 6-7 | 86 | 3-4 | 75 | 0-0 | 0 | 0 | 2 | 2 | 2 | 2 | 0 | 0 | 2 | 15 |
| 6 | Rustam Murzagaliyev | 27:41 | 2-5 | 40 | 0-1 | 0 | 0-0 | 0 | 0 | 1 | 1 | 0 | 2 | 1 | 0 | 1 | 4 |
| 7 | Mikhail Yevstigneyev | 12:03 | 1-5 | 20 | 0-0 | 0 | 1-2 | 50 | 1 | 2 | 3 | 0 | 2 | 0 | 0 | 2 | 3 |
| 8 | Vitaliy Lapchenko | 13:29 | 0-8 | 0 | 0-4 | 0 | 0-0 | 0 | 1 | 2 | 3 | 0 | 0 | 0 | 0 | 5 | 0 |
| 9 | Nikolay Bazhini | 10:19 | 0-2 | 0 | 0-1 | 0 | 0-0 | 0 | 0 | 0 | 0 | 1 | 1 | 0 | 0 | 2 | 0 |
| 10 | Konstantin Dvirnyy | Did not play | | | | | | | | | | | | | | | |
| 11 | Anton Ponomarev | 26:49 | 3-12 | 25 | 0-5 | 0 | 0-0 | 0 | 2 | 4 | 6 | 0 | 1 | 0 | 0 | 5 | 6 |
| 12 | Dmitriy Klimov | 17:09 | 0-2 | 0 | 0-1 | 0 | 0-0 | 0 | 1 | 2 | 3 | 1 | 0 | 0 | 0 | 1 | 0 |
| 13 | Rustam Yargaliyev | 21:59 | 2-11 | 18 | 0-2 | 0 | 0-0 | 0 | 1 | 4 | 5 | 0 | 0 | 0 | 0 | 0 | 4 |
| 14 | Leonid Bondarovich | 14:11 | 3-4 | 75 | 0-0 | 0 | 0-0 | 0 | 4 | 0 | 4 | 0 | 2 | 0 | 0 | 2 | 6 |
| 15 | Alexander Zhigulin | 12:30 | 0-1 | 0 | 0-1 | 0 | 0-2 | 0 | 1 | 1 | 2 | 0 | 0 | 1 | 0 | 1 | 0 |
| Totals | | | 20-63 | 32 | 6-23 | 26 | 1-4 | 25 | 11 | 19 | 30 | 5 | 12 | 3 | 0 | 21 | 47 |

South Korea
| # | Player | Min | FG | | 3FG | | FT | | REB | | | AST | PF | TO | STL | BS | Pts |
| # | Player | Min | M/A | % | M/A | % | M/A | % | OFF | DEF | TOT | AST | PF | TO | STL | BS | Pts |
|---|---|---|---|---|---|---|---|---|---|---|---|---|---|---|---|---|---|
| 4 | Kim Min-Goo | 22:26 | 5-14 | 36 | 4-10 | 40 | 0-1 | 0 | 1 | 5 | 6 | 1 | 1 | 0 | 1 | 0 | 14 |
| 5 | Kim Sun-Hyung | 12:17 | 6-6 | 100 | 1-1 | 100 | 1-2 | 50 | 1 | 0 | 1 | 0 | 0 | 1 | 0 | 1 | 14 |
| 6 | Yang Dong-Geun | 19:03 | 3-6 | 50 | 0-2 | 0 | 0-0 | 0 | 0 | 3 | 3 | 2 | 1 | 1 | 0 | 2 | 6 |
| 7 | Kim Tae-Sul | 20:56 | 0-2 | 0 | 0-0 | 0 | 0-0 | 0 | 2 | 0 | 2 | 4 | 1 | 1 | 0 | 2 | 0 |
| 8 | Moon Seong-Gon | 01:59 | 1-3 | 33 | 1-3 | 33 | 0-0 | 0 | 0 | 0 | 0 | 0 | 0 | 0 | 0 | 0 | 3 |
| 9 | Yun Ho-Young | 11:56 | 1-3 | 33 | 0-0 | 0 | 0-0 | 0 | 1 | 1 | 2 | 2 | 0 | 0 | 0 | 0 | 2 |
| 10 | Cho Sung-Min | 21:43 | 5-12 | 42 | 2-6 | 33 | 0-0 | 0 | 0 | 3 | 3 | 0 | 1 | 1 | 0 | 2 | 12 |
| 11 | Kim Joo-Sung | 17:09 | 1-2 | 50 | 0-0 | 0 | 0-0 | 0 | 2 | 4 | 6 | 3 | 3 | 0 | 0 | 2 | 2 |
| 12 | Kim Jong-Kyu | 18:33 | 0-1 | 0 | 0-0 | 0 | 2-2 | 100 | 1 | 1 | 2 | 1 | 0 | 0 | 0 | 2 | 2 |
| 13 | Choi Jun-Yong | 09:35 | 0-1 | 0 | 0-1 | 0 | 1-2 | 50 | 1 | 3 | 4 | 2 | 3 | 0 | 0 | 0 | 1 |
| 14 | Lee Seung-Jun | 15:40 | 3-5 | 60 | 1-2 | 50 | 0-1 | 0 | 1 | 4 | 5 | 0 | 1 | 0 | 0 | 1 | 7 |
| 15 | Lee Jong-Hyun | 28:37 | 2-5 | 40 | 0-0 | 0 | 4-5 | 80 | 2 | 4 | 6 | 3 | 2 | 0 | 1 | 0 | 8 |
| Totals | | | 27-60 | 45 | 9-25 | 36 | 8-13 | 62 | 12 | 28 | 40 | 18 | 13 | 4 | 2 | 12 | 71 |

== August 7 ==
=== Iran vs. Kazakhstan ===
7 August 2013
12:45

Report

| Iran | 85–53 | Kazakhstan |
Scoring by quarter: 22–15, 19–9, 29–12, 15–17
| Pts: Haddadi 16; Rebs: Haddadi 9 Asts: Kamrani 7 | | Pts: Yargaliyev 14; Rebs: Ponomarev 7 Asts: Murzagaliyev 5 |

Mall of Asia Arena, Pasay
Referees: Mohammad Alamiri (KUW), Ricor Buaron (PHI), Cheung Kwok Shun Andy (HKG)

Iran
| # | Player | Min | FG | | 3FG | | FT | | REB | | | AST | PF | TO | STL | BS | Pts |
| # | Player | Min | M/A | % | M/A | % | M/A | % | OFF | DEF | TOT | AST | PF | TO | STL | BS | Pts |
|---|---|---|---|---|---|---|---|---|---|---|---|---|---|---|---|---|---|
| 4 | Mohammad Jamshidi | 18:38 | 1-3 | 33 | 0-2 | 0 | 1-2 | 50 | 0 | 2 | 2 | 3 | 2 | 0 | 0 | 1 | 3 |
| 5 | Aren Davoudi | 15:44 | 3-4 | 75 | 1-2 | 50 | 0-0 | 0 | 0 | 1 | 1 | 2 | 0 | 2 | 0 | 2 | 7 |
| 6 | Javad Davari | 11:53 | 1-3 | 33 | 1-2 | 50 | 0-0 | 0 | 0 | 2 | 2 | 1 | 3 | 0 | 0 | 1 | 3 |
| 7 | Mehdi Kamrani | 21:12 | 5-8 | 63 | 1-3 | 33 | 0-0 | 0 | 0 | 2 | 2 | 7 | 2 | 2 | 0 | 1 | 11 |
| 8 | Saman Veisi | 13:09 | 3-4 | 75 | 1-2 | 50 | 2-2 | 100 | 0 | 1 | 1 | 0 | 0 | 0 | 0 | 0 | 9 |
| 9 | Oshin Sahakian | 21:30 | 1-2 | 50 | 0-0 | 0 | 0-0 | 0 | 2 | 1 | 3 | 0 | 2 | 0 | 0 | 1 | 2 |
| 10 | Hamed Afagh | 20:12 | 6-9 | 67 | 1-2 | 50 | 2-3 | 67 | 2 | 0 | 2 | 2 | 0 | 3 | 0 | 1 | 15 |
| 11 | Hamed Sohrabnejad | 09:54 | 2-3 | 67 | 0-0 | 0 | 2-2 | 100 | 0 | 0 | 0 | 1 | 0 | 0 | 0 | 1 | 6 |
| 12 | Asghar Kardoust | 18:21 | 3-4 | 75 | 0-0 | 0 | 1-2 | 50 | 3 | 3 | 6 | 1 | 2 | 0 | 0 | 2 | 7 |
| 13 | Rouzbeh Arghavan | 12:12 | 1-2 | 50 | 0-0 | 0 | 0-0 | 0 | 0 | 1 | 1 | 1 | 0 | 0 | 0 | 1 | 2 |
| 14 | Samad Nikkhah Bahrami | 19:08 | 2-4 | 50 | 0-1 | 0 | 0-2 | 0 | 0 | 2 | 2 | 2 | 2 | 1 | 0 | 3 | 4 |
| 15 | Hamed Haddadi | 18:00 | 6-11 | 55 | 0-0 | 0 | 4-7 | 57 | 3 | 6 | 9 | 0 | 1 | 0 | 1 | 1 | 16 |
| Totals | | | 34-57 | 60 | 5-14 | 36 | 12-20 | 60 | 10 | 21 | 31 | 20 | 14 | 8 | 1 | 15 | 85 |

Kazakhstan
| # | Player | Min | FG | | 3FG | | FT | | REB | | | AST | PF | TO | STL | BS | Pts |
| # | Player | Min | M/A | % | M/A | % | M/A | % | OFF | DEF | TOT | AST | PF | TO | STL | BS | Pts |
|---|---|---|---|---|---|---|---|---|---|---|---|---|---|---|---|---|---|
| 4 | Timur Sultanov | 17:22 | 2-3 | 67 | 1-2 | 50 | 3-4 | 75 | 0 | 0 | 0 | 0 | 1 | 0 | 0 | 5 | 8 |
| 5 | Jerry Johnson | Did not play | | | | | | | | | | | | | | | |
| 6 | Rustam Murzagaliyev | 29:58 | 0-4 | 0 | 0-3 | 0 | 0-0 | 0 | 0 | 2 | 2 | 5 | 4 | 0 | 1 | 1 | 0 |
| 7 | Mikhail Yevstigneyev | Did not play | | | | | | | | | | | | | | | |
| 8 | Vitaliy Lapchenko | 27:37 | 3-11 | 27 | 0-0 | 0 | 2-2 | 100 | 4 | 1 | 5 | 1 | 2 | 1 | 1 | 1 | 8 |
| 9 | Nikolay Bazhini | 22:35 | 2-5 | 40 | 2-4 | 50 | 0-0 | 0 | 2 | 2 | 4 | 2 | 0 | 0 | 0 | 0 | 6 |
| 10 | Konstantin Dvirnyy | Did not play | | | | | | | | | | | | | | | |
| 11 | Anton Ponomarev | 16:02 | 2-5 | 40 | 0-0 | 0 | 1-2 | 50 | 2 | 5 | 7 | 0 | 3 | 1 | 0 | 5 | 5 |
| 12 | Dmitriy Klimov | 25:19 | 3-7 | 43 | 1-4 | 25 | 0-0 | 0 | 1 | 1 | 2 | 1 | 2 | 4 | 0 | 1 | 7 |
| 13 | Rustam Yargaliyev | 29:58 | 6-13 | 46 | 2-7 | 29 | 0-0 | 0 | 0 | 1 | 1 | 2 | 5 | 0 | 0 | 1 | 14 |
| 14 | Leonid Bondarovich | 15:46 | 0-4 | 0 | 0-0 | 0 | 0-0 | 0 | 0 | 1 | 1 | 0 | 3 | 0 | 0 | 2 | 0 |
| 15 | Alexander Zhigulin | 15:18 | 1-3 | 33 | 1-1 | 100 | 2-2 | 100 | 2 | 1 | 3 | 1 | 1 | 0 | 0 | 5 | 5 |
| Totals | | | 19-55 | 35 | 7-21 | 33 | 8-10 | 80 | 11 | 14 | 25 | 12 | 21 | 6 | 2 | 21 | 53 |

=== Bahrain vs. China ===
7 August 2013
17:45

Report

| Bahrain | 66–88 | China |
Scoring by quarter: 5–21, 15–21, 23–19, 23–27
| Pts: Al-Tawash 13; Rebs: Alderazi 8 Asts: Azzam 5 | | Pts: Chen J. 13; Rebs: Wang Z.Z. 9 Asts: Zhang 4 |

Mall of Asia Arena, Pasay
Referees: Mohd Naser Abu Rashed (JOR), Chong Yun Aun (MAS), Glenn Cornelio (PHI)

Bahrain
| # | Player | Min | FG | | 3FG | | FT | | REB | | | AST | PF | TO | STL | BS | Pts |
| # | Player | Min | M/A | % | M/A | % | M/A | % | OFF | DEF | TOT | AST | PF | TO | STL | BS | Pts |
|---|---|---|---|---|---|---|---|---|---|---|---|---|---|---|---|---|---|
| 4 | Mohamed Ebrahim | Did not play | | | | | | | | | | | | | | | |
| 5 | Hussain Al-Tawash | 32:55 | 6-14 | 43 | 1-3 | 33 | 0-0 | 0 | 0 | 0 | 0 | 3 | 2 | 0 | 0 | 2 | 13 |
| 6 | Mohamed Kawaid | 13:56 | 1-7 | 14 | 1-3 | 33 | 0-0 | 0 | 1 | 2 | 3 | 0 | 0 | 1 | 1 | 1 | 3 |
| 7 | Bader Malabes | 04:16 | 0-2 | 0 | 0-1 | 0 | 0-0 | 0 | 0 | 1 | 1 | 0 | 0 | 0 | 0 | 0 | 0 |
| 8 | Ahmed Ismaeel | Did not play | | | | | | | | | | | | | | | |
| 9 | Mohamed Alderazi | 32:30 | 4-12 | 33 | 0-3 | 0 | 1-2 | 50 | 1 | 7 | 8 | 1 | 0 | 0 | 0 | 1 | 9 |
| 10 | Abdul-Rahman Mubarak | 24:49 | 2-7 | 29 | 1-3 | 33 | 0-0 | 0 | 0 | 1 | 1 | 2 | 1 | 0 | 0 | 0 | 5 |
| 11 | Subah Azzam | 29:15 | 5-7 | 71 | 0-1 | 0 | 3-3 | 100 | 1 | 3 | 4 | 5 | 0 | 1 | 0 | 0 | 13 |
| 12 | Chester Giles | Did not play | | | | | | | | | | | | | | | |
| 13 | Yunes Kawaid | 25:28 | 3-7 | 43 | 0-1 | 0 | 4-4 | 100 | 0 | 3 | 3 | 2 | 2 | 1 | 0 | 1 | 10 |
| 14 | Ahmed Akber | 21:23 | 5-10 | 50 | 0-0 | 0 | 0-2 | 0 | 2 | 3 | 5 | 1 | 0 | 0 | 2 | 5 | 10 |
| 15 | Ahmed Aman | 15:23 | 1-4 | 25 | 1-3 | 33 | 0-0 | 0 | 0 | 3 | 3 | 0 | 2 | 2 | 0 | 3 | 3 |
| Totals | | | 27-70 | 39 | 4-18 | 22 | 8-11 | 73 | 5 | 23 | 28 | 14 | 7 | 5 | 3 | 13 | 66 |

China
| # | Player | Min | FG | | 3FG | | FT | | REB | | | AST | PF | TO | STL | BS | Pts |
| # | Player | Min | M/A | % | M/A | % | M/A | % | OFF | DEF | TOT | AST | PF | TO | STL | BS | Pts |
|---|---|---|---|---|---|---|---|---|---|---|---|---|---|---|---|---|---|
| 4 | Guo Ailun | 20:11 | 4-8 | 50 | 2-5 | 40 | 1-2 | 50 | 0 | 1 | 1 | 1 | 0 | 0 | 0 | 0 | 11 |
| 5 | Liu Xiaoyu | Did not play | | | | | | | | | | | | | | | |
| 6 | Chen Jianghua | 16:55 | 5-9 | 56 | 1-3 | 33 | 2-2 | 100 | 1 | 1 | 2 | 2 | 1 | 0 | 0 | 0 | 13 |
| 7 | Wang Shipeng | 19:22 | 2-4 | 50 | 2-4 | 50 | 0-0 | 0 | 0 | 2 | 2 | 2 | 1 | 0 | 0 | 1 | 6 |
| 8 | Zhu Fangyu | 24:34 | 2-5 | 40 | 0-2 | 0 | 1-2 | 50 | 0 | 3 | 3 | 3 | 2 | 0 | 0 | 2 | 5 |
| 9 | Sun Yue | 13:44 | 1-5 | 20 | 0-2 | 0 | 0-0 | 0 | 0 | 3 | 3 | 1 | 0 | 0 | 0 | 2 | 2 |
| 10 | Li Xiaoxu | 11:46 | 1-4 | 25 | 0-0 | 0 | 0-0 | 0 | 1 | 5 | 6 | 0 | 1 | 0 | 0 | 1 | 2 |
| 11 | Yi Jianlian | 12:50 | 5-7 | 71 | 1-1 | 100 | 1-1 | 100 | 1 | 5 | 6 | 0 | 0 | 0 | 0 | 0 | 12 |
| 12 | Zhang Bo | 19:44 | 1-4 | 25 | 0-2 | 0 | 3-4 | 75 | 2 | 0 | 2 | 4 | 0 | 1 | 0 | 1 | 5 |
| 13 | Wang Zhelin | 20:56 | 3-7 | 43 | 0-0 | 0 | 5-6 | 83 | 2 | 7 | 9 | 1 | 1 | 0 | 1 | 2 | 11 |
| 14 | Wang Zhizhi | 19:52 | 5-8 | 63 | 1-1 | 100 | 0-0 | 0 | 1 | 5 | 6 | 2 | 2 | 0 | 0 | 0 | 11 |
| 15 | Zhou Peng | 19:59 | 4-4 | 100 | 2-2 | 100 | 0-0 | 0 | 0 | 4 | 4 | 0 | 1 | 1 | 0 | 4 | 10 |
| Totals | | | 33-65 | 51 | 9-22 | 41 | 13-17 | 76 | 8 | 36 | 44 | 16 | 9 | 2 | 1 | 13 | 88 |

=== India vs. Korea ===
7 August 2013
22:30

Report

| India | 54–95 | South Korea |
Scoring by quarter: 11–28, 11–19, 18–16, 14–32
| Pts: P. Singh 18; Rebs: At. Singh 5 Asts: Y. Singh 3 | | Pts: Kim M.G., Cho 14; Rebs: Lee S.J. 9 Asts: Kim M.G. 9 |

Mall of Asia Arena, Pasay
Referees: Toru Katayose (JPN), Chen Ying-Cheng (TPE), Tan Chin Siong (MAS)

India
| # | Player | Min | FG | | 3FG | | FT | | REB | | | AST | PF | TO | STL | BS | Pts |
| # | Player | Min | M/A | % | M/A | % | M/A | % | OFF | DEF | TOT | AST | PF | TO | STL | BS | Pts |
|---|---|---|---|---|---|---|---|---|---|---|---|---|---|---|---|---|---|
| 4 | Sambhaji Kadam | Did not play | | | | | | | | | | | | | | | |
| 5 | Narender Kumar Grewal | 18 | 0/4 | 0 | 0/4 | 0 | 0/0 | 0 | 0 | 0 | 0 | 0 | 3 | 1 | 0 | 0 | 0 |
| 6 | Pratham Singh | 31 | 7/12 | 58.33 | 4/6 | 66.67 | 1/1 | 100 | 0 | 0 | 0 | 1 | 0 | 0 | 1 | 0 | 18 |
| 7 | Vinay Kaushik | Did not play | | | | | | | | | | | | | | | |
| 8 | Arjun Singh | Did not play | | | | | | | | | | | | | | | |
| 9 | Vishesh Bhriguvanshi | 30 | 3/10 | 30 | 3/8 | 37.50 | 0/0 | 0 | 0 | 0 | 0 | 0 | 5 | 3 | 1 | 0 | 6 |
| 10 | Amritpal Singh | 6 | 1/2 | 50 | 1/2 | 50 | 0/0 | 0 | 1 | 3 | 4 | 0 | 0 | 2 | 0 | 0 | 2 |
| 11 | Joginder Singh | 31 | 4/10 | 40 | 2/4 | 50 | 0/0 | 0 | 1 | 3 | 4 | 2 | 5 | 3 | 0 | 0 | 10 |
| 12 | Satnam Singh Bhamara | 12 | 1/2 | 50 | 1/2 | 50 | 1/2 | 50 | 0 | 3 | 3 | 0 | 2 | 0 | 0 | 0 | 3 |
| 13 | Amjyot Singh | 21 | 1/6 | 16.67 | 1/5 | 20 | 2/2 | 100 | 1 | 4 | 5 | 1 | 4 | 4 | 0 | 1 | 4 |
| 14 | Yadwinder Singh | 24 | 0/4 | 0 | 0/2 | 0 | 0/0 | 0 | 1 | 3 | 4 | 3 | 3 | 2 | 0 | 0 | 0 |
| 15 | Rikin Shantilal Pethani | 23 | 5/9 | 55.56 | 5/9 | 55.56 | 1/3 | 33.33 | 2 | 1 | 3 | 1 | 1 | 0 | 0 | 0 | 11 |
| Totals | | 200 | 22/59 | 37.29 | 17/42 | 40.48 | 5/8 | 62.5 | 6 | 17 | 23 | 8 | 23 | 15 | 2 | 1 | 54 |

South Korea
| # | Player | Min | FG | | 3FG | | FT | | REB | | | AST | PF | TO | STL | BS | Pts |
| # | Player | Min | M/A | % | M/A | % | M/A | % | OFF | DEF | TOT | AST | PF | TO | STL | BS | Pts |
|---|---|---|---|---|---|---|---|---|---|---|---|---|---|---|---|---|---|
| 4 | Kim Min-Goo | 17 | 5/9 | 55.56 | 1/2 | 50 | 0/0 | 0 | 1 | 7 | 8 | 9 | 0 | 1 | 2 | 1 | 14 |
| 5 | Kim Sun-Hyung | 12 | 2/4 | 50 | 2/2 | 100 | 2/3 | 66.67 | 0 | 0 | 0 | 0 | 1 | 0 | 0 | 0 | 6 |
| 6 | Yang Dong-Geun | 17 | 4/5 | 80 | 2/2 | 100 | 0/0 | 0 | 0 | 4 | 4 | 8 | 0 | 2 | 1 | 0 | 10 |
| 7 | Kim Tae-Sul | 12 | 0/2 | 0 | 0/1 | 0 | 1/2 | 50 | 0 | 0 | 0 | 1 | 1 | 0 | 1 | 0 | 1 |
| 8 | Moon Seong-Gon | 10 | 0/3 | 0 | 0/1 | 0 | 1/2 | 50 | 0 | 1 | 1 | 0 | 1 | 0 | 1 | 0 | 1 |
| 9 | Yoon Ho-Young | 17 | 1/3 | 33.33 | 0/1 | 0 | 0/0 | 0 | 0 | 3 | 3 | 0 | 0 | 0 | 3 | 1 | 3 |
| 10 | Cho Sung-Min | 16 | 5/6 | 83.33 | 2/2 | 100 | 1/1 | 100 | 0 | 3 | 3 | 3 | 3 | 3 | 0 | 0 | 14 |
| 11 | Kim Joo-Sung | 15 | 3/5 | 60 | 3/5 | 60 | 2/3 | 66.67 | 1 | 1 | 2 | 1 | 0 | 0 | 0 | 1 | 8 |
| 12 | Kim Jong-Kyu | 20 | 1/2 | 50 | 1/2 | 50 | 5/6 | 83.33 | 1 | 2 | 3 | 0 | 3 | 1 | 1 | 1 | 7 |
| 13 | Choi Jun-Yong | 16 | 4/8 | 50 | 3/6 | 50 | 4/4 | 100 | 1 | 0 | 1 | 3 | 0 | 2 | 0 | 2 | 13 |
| 14 | Lee Seung-Jun | 23 | 4/6 | 66.67 | 4/6 | 66.67 | 2/2 | 100 | 0 | 3 | 3 | 2 | 3 | 0 | 0 | 2 | 10 |
| 15 | Lee Jong-Hyun | 20 | 4/7 | 57.14 | 4/7 | 57.14 | 2/2 | 100 | 0 | 3 | 3 | 2 | 3 | 0 | 0 | 2 | 10 |
| Totals | | 200 | 33/60 | 55 | 22/37 | 59.46 | 18/23 | 78.26 | 8 | 29 | 37 | 27 | 13 | 9 | 10 | 10 | 95 |
