= Basketball at the 2010 Asian Games =

- Venue: Guangti Gymnasium; Huangpu Gymnasium; Guangzhou International Sports Arena; Ying Tung Gymnasium
- Date: 13–26 November 2010
- Competitors: 273 from 18 nations

Basketball was one of the 42 sports at the 16th Asian Games 2010 at Guangzhou, Guangdong, China. The event was held at the 13,000 seat Guangzhou International Sports Arena, Huangpu Gymnasium, Guangti Gymnasium, Ying Dong Gymnasium and Sports and Entertainment Centre.

China defeated Korea in both of the tournament's gold medal games; Iran won the men's bronze medal defeating Japan, and Japan defeated Chinese Taipei to win the bronze medal in the women's tournament.

== Schedule ==
Q	Qualification	P	Preliminary round	¼	Quarterfinals	½	Semifinals	F	Finals

Event↓/Date →	13th Sat	14th Sun	15th Mon	16th Tue	17th Wed	18th Thu	19th Fri	20th Sat	21st Sun	22nd Mon	23rd Tue	24th Wed	25th Thu	26th Fri
Men	Q	Q	Q	P	P		P		P	P		¼	½	F
Women						P		P		P		½	F	

== Medalists ==
Event	Gold	Silver	Bronze
Men	China; Ding Jinhui; Liu Wei; Zhang Qingpeng; Wang Shipeng; Zhu Fangyu; Sun Yue; Zhang Zhaoxu; Zhang Bo; Tang Zhengdong; Li Xiaoxu; Wang Zhizhi; Zhou Peng	South Korea; Park Chan-hee; Lee Jung-suk; Yang Dong-geun; Kim Joo-sung; Ha Seung-jin; Lee Kyu-sup; Cho Sung-min; Yang Hee-jong; Ham Ji-hoon; Kim Sung-chul; Lee Seung-jun; Oh Se-keun	Iran; Amir Amini; Aren Davoudi; Javad Davari; Mehdi Kamrani; Saeid Davarpanah; Oshin Sahakian; Hamed Afagh; Hamed Sohrabnejad; Ali Jamshidi; Asghar Kardoust; Samad Nikkhah Bahrami; Ali Doraghi
Women	China; Zhang Hanlan; Bian Lan; Ding Yuan; Zhang Wei; Miao Lijie; Guan Xin; Zhang Fan; Ma Zengyu; Chen Xiaoli; Gao Song; Liu Dan; Chen Nan	South Korea; Kim Bo-mi; Kim Ji-yoon; Jung Sun-hwa; Lee Mi-sun; Lee Kyung-eun; Kang A-jeong; Beon Yeon-ha; Park Jung-eun; Ha Eun-joo; Kim Dan-bi; Kim Kwe-ryong; Sin Jung-ja	Japan; Yoko Nagi; Maki Takada; Yuka Mamiya; Ai Mitani; Ayumi Suzuki; Hiromi Suwa; Saori Fujiyoshi; Yoshie Sakurada; Asami Yoshida; Yuko Oga; Reika Takahashi; Sachiko Ishikawa

== Medal table ==
Rank	Nation	Gold	Silver	Bronze	Total
1	China (CHN)	2	0	0	2
2	South Korea (KOR)	0	2	0	2
3	Iran (IRI)	0	0	1	1
3	Japan (JPN)	0	0	1	1
Totals (4 entries)		2	2	2	6

== Draw ==
The teams were seeded based on their final ranking at the 2006 Asian Games.

=== Men ===
- Best 8 teams from the basketball competition of the 2006 Asian Games that are participating in 2010 directly entered the second round.

Qualifying round – Group A

- Hong Kong
- North Korea
- Athletes from Kuwait*

Qualifying round – Group B

- ~~Saudi Arabia~~*
- Philippines

Qualifying round – Group C

- Turkmenistan
- Mongolia

Qualifying round – Group D

- Afghanistan
- India

Preliminary round – Group E

- China (Host)
- Jordan (4)
- South Korea (5)
- Uzbekistan (11)
- 1st Qualifying round – Group A
- 1st Qualifying round – Group C

Preliminary round – Group F

- Qatar (2)
- Iran (3)
- Japan (6)
- Chinese Taipei (8)
- 1st Qualifying round – Group B
- 1st Qualifying round – Group D

* The Philippines, which has made it to the latter stages of every Asian Games basketball tournament from 1951 to 2002, was originally drawn with Saudi Arabia but Saudi Arabia withdrew. Kuwait, which was originally drawn with Hong Kong and North Korea, was re-drawn with the Philippines to balance the number of teams in each group.

=== Women ===
Group A

- China (Host)
- South Korea (4)
- Thailand
- India

Group B

- Chinese Taipei (2)
- Japan (3)
- Maldives

== Final standing ==
=== Men ===
Rank	Team	Pld	W	L
1st place, gold medalist(s)	China	8	8	0
2nd place, silver medalist(s)	South Korea	8	6	2
3rd place, bronze medalist(s)	Iran	8	6	2
4	Japan	8	5	3
5	Qatar	8	5	3
6	Philippines	9	5	4
7	Jordan	8	4	4
8	North Korea	9	3	6
9	Chinese Taipei	5	1	4
10	Mongolia	6	2	4
11	Uzbekistan	5	0	5
12	India	6	1	5
13	Turkmenistan	1	0	1
14	Afghanistan	1	0	1
15	Hong Kong	1	0	1
16	Athletes from Kuwait	1	0	1

=== Women ===
Rank	Team	Pld	W	L
1st place, gold medalist(s)	China	5	5	0
2nd place, silver medalist(s)	South Korea	5	3	2
3rd place, bronze medalist(s)	Japan	4	3	1
4	Chinese Taipei	4	1	3
5	Thailand	4	2	2
6	Maldives	3	0	3
7	India	3	0	3
