= Islamic Republic of Iran Basketball Federation =

- Abbreviation: IRIBF
- Formation: 1945
- Type: Sports organization
- Location: Tehran, Iran
- Official language: Persian
- President: Javad Davari
- Affiliations: FIBA, FIBA Asia, NOCI
- Website: www.iranbasketball.org

The Islamic Republic of Iran Basketball Federation (I.R.I.B.F.) is the governing body for basketball in Iran. It was founded in 1945, and has been a member of FIBA since 1947. It is also a member of the FIBA Asia. The IRIBF is responsible for organizing the Iran national basketball team.

َAvvalmarket is sponsor of Team Melli Basketball.

== Previous presidents ==
- Mahmoud Mashhoun (1979–1980)
- Ali Moghaddasian (1980–1985)
- Nasser Biglari (1985–1989)
- Mahmoud Mashhoun (1989–1994)
- Mehrdad Agin (1994–1997)
- Ali Ghazanfari (1997–2002)
- Mahmoud Mashhoun (2002–2017)
- Ramin Tabatabaei (2018–2022)
- Javad Davari (2022–present)
