= Takumi Ishizaki =

Japanese basketball player

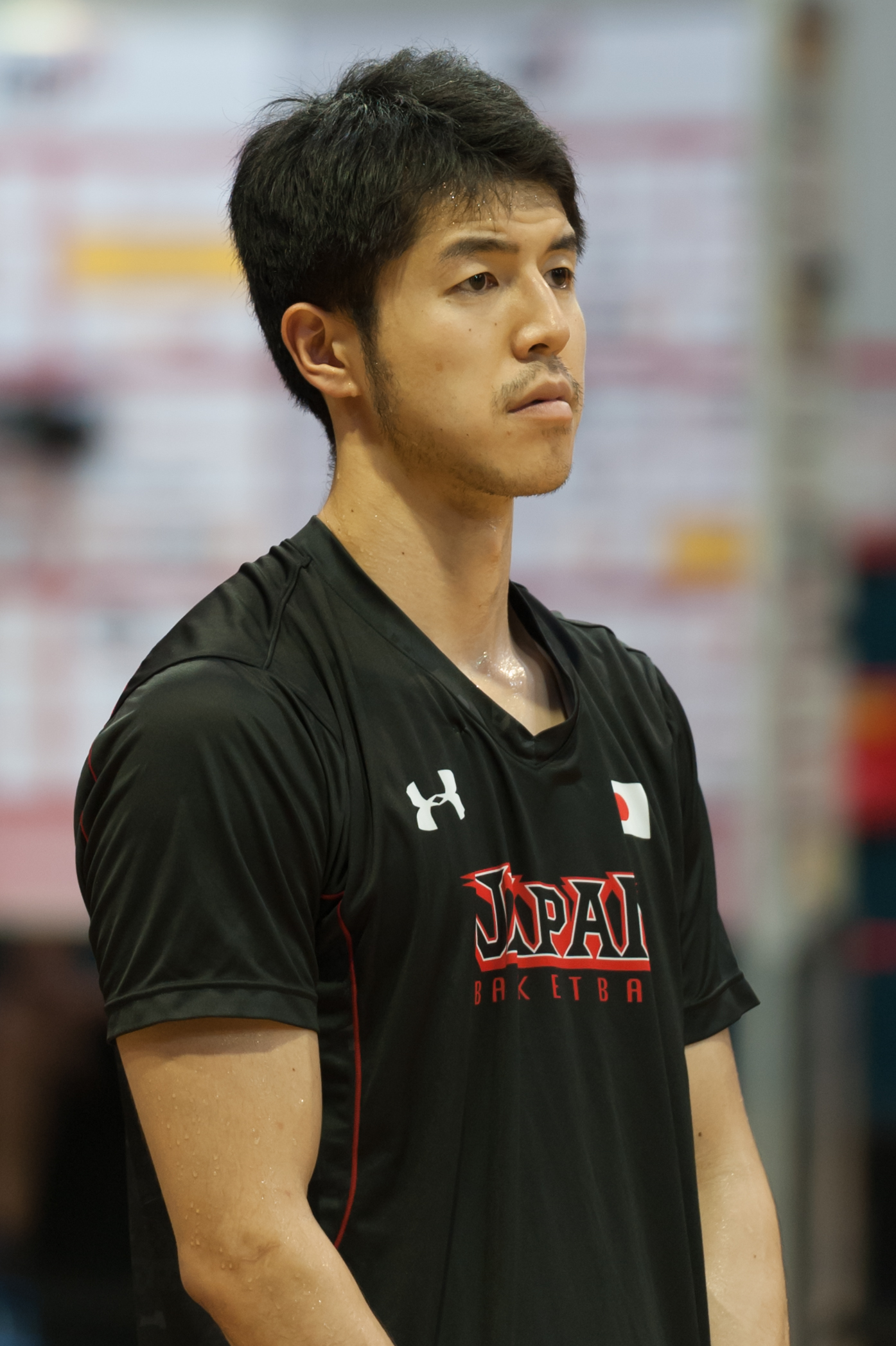

Personal information
- Born: June 6, 1984 (age 42)
- Listed height: 188 cm (6 ft 2 in)
- Listed weight: 85 kg (187 lb)

Career information
- Playing career: 2007–2021
- Position: Point guard
- Number: 0

Career history
- 2007–2010: Toshiba Brave Thunders Kanagawa
- 2010–2011: Shimane Susanoo Magic
- 2011–2013: Chemnitz 99
- 2013–2014: MHP Riesen Ludwigsburg
- 2014–2017: Nagoya Diamond Dolphins
- 2017–2021: Ryukyu Golden Kings
Medals
Men's basketball
Representing Japan
Asian Games
Bronze medal – third place	2014 Incheon	Team competition
East Asian Games
Bronze medal – third place	2009 Hong Kong	Team competition
FIBA Asia Challenge
Silver medal – second place	2010 Beirut	Team
William Jones Cup
Bronze medal – third place	2010 Taipei	Team

Takumi Ishizaki (石崎 巧, Ishizaki Takumi; born July 6, 1984) is a Japanese retired professional basketball player who formerly played for the Riesen Ludwigsburg in the German Basketball Bundesliga and BV Chemnitz 99 of the German ProA.

He has been a member of the Japan national basketball team.

== Career statistics ==
Legend
GP	Games played	GS	Games started	MPG	Minutes per game
FG%	Field goal percentage	3P%	3-point field goal percentage	FT%	Free throw percentage
RPG	Rebounds per game	APG	Assists per game	SPG	Steals per game
BPG	Blocks per game	PPG	Points per game	**Bold**	Career high

Year	Team	GP	GS	MPG	FG%	3P%	FT%	RPG	APG	SPG	BPG	PPG
2017-18	Ryukyu	55	8	12.7	.416	.402	.720	1.1	2.1	.3	.1	3.9
