= Shahrdari Arak BC =

Shahrdari Arak
- Leagues: Iranian Super League
- Founded: 2011; 6 years ago
- Arena: Arak Emam Khomeini Arena
- Location: Arak, Iran
- Team colors: White and orange
- President: Mohammadreza Azizmohammadi
- Head coach: (Iran) Mohammad kasaeipour
- Championships: –
- Website: portal.sportarak.ir

Shahrdari Arak BC is an Iranian professional basketball team based in Arak and was founded in 2011. The team compete in the Iranian Super League. They play their home games at Arak Emam Khomeini Arena .

== Franchise history ==
Shahrdari Arak BC Qualified to Iran's division 2 in 2014. In the Iran's division 2 league they became third team that could Qualified to Iranian Super League in 2015.

== Tournament records ==
=== Iranian Super League ===
- 2015-2016 : 4th place
- 2016-2017: 4th place
