= Liu Xiaoyu (basketball) =

Chinese basketball player

No. 19 – Beijing Royal Fighters
- Position: Point guard
- League: CBA

Personal information
- Born: 14 March 1989 (age 37) Changchun, Jilin, China
- Listed height: 6 ft 2 in (1.88 m)
- Listed weight: 170 lb (77 kg)

Career information
- NBA draft: 2013: undrafted
- Playing career: 2008–present

Career history

Playing
- 2008–2015: Guangdong Southern Tigers
- 2015–2017: Shanghai Sharks
- 2017–2022: Beijing Ducks
- 2023–2025: Beijing Royal Fighters
- 2025–2026: Ningbo Rockets
- 2026–present: Beijing Royal Fighters

Coaching
- 2025–2026: Ningbo Rockets (assistant)
- 2026–present: Beijing Royal Fighters (assistant)
Medals
Men's basketball
Representing China
East Asian Games
| Silver medal – second place | 2013 Tianjin |

Liu Xiaoyu (simplified Chinese: 刘晓宇; traditional Chinese: 劉曉宇; pinyin: Liú Xiǎoyǔ; born on 14 March 1989) is a Chinese professional basketball player for the Beijing Royal Fighters of the Chinese Basketball Association (CBA). He is a member of the Chinese men's national basketball team and played multiple international tournaments including the 2013 FIBA Asia Championship, 2014 Asian Games and 2017 FIBA Asia Cup.

In 2022, Liu signed with the Bay Area Dragons, but he didn't play any games.

In August 2026, Liu rejoined Beijing Royal Fighters as a player-coach.
