= Aren Davoudi =

Iranian basketball player

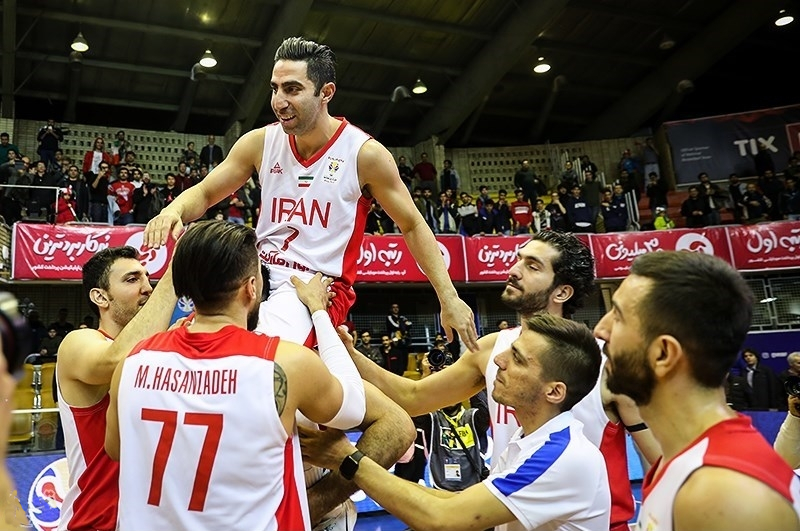

Personal information
- Born: 12 July 1986 (age 40) Isfahan, Iran
- Listed height: 5 ft 10 in (1.78 m)
- Listed weight: 172 lb (78 kg)

Career information
- Playing career: 2004–2022
- Position: Point guard

Career history
- 2004–2012: Zob Ahan Isfahan
- 2012–2014: Hamyari Shahrdari Zanjan
- 2014–2015: Azad University
- 2015–2016: Naft Abadan
- 2016–2017: Shahrdari Arak
- 2017–2018: Shahrdari Tabriz
- 2018–2019: Naft Abadan
- 2019–2020: Chemidor Tehran
- 2020–2021: Naft Abadan
- 2021–2022: Mahram Tehran
Medals
Men's basketball
Representing Iran
Asian Games
Silver medal – second place	2018 Jakarta	Team
Bronze medal – third place	2010 Guangzhou	Team
Asian Championship
Gold medal – first place	2009 Tianjin	Team
Gold medal – first place	2013 Manila	Team
Asian Cup
Gold medal – first place	2012 Tokyo	Team

Aren Davoudi Chegani (Persian: آرن داوودی چگانی; Armenian: Արեն Դավուդի, born 12 July 1986) is a professional Iranian basketball player of Armenian descent who currently plays for Hamyari Shahrdari of the Iranian Super League and also for the Iranian national basketball team. He is a 6-foot point guard.

From 2007, Davoudi has also been a member of the Iran national basketball team, but he first played for the team during their second consecutive gold medal run at the FIBA Asia Championship 2009. He saw action in six of nine games off the bench.

== Honours ==
=== National team ===
- Asian Championship
  - Gold medal: 2009, 2013
- Asian Games
  - Bronze medal: 2010
- Asian Under-18 Championship
  - Gold medal: 2004
  - Silver medal: 2002
