= Guangzhou International Sports Arena =

Sports venue in Guangzhou, China

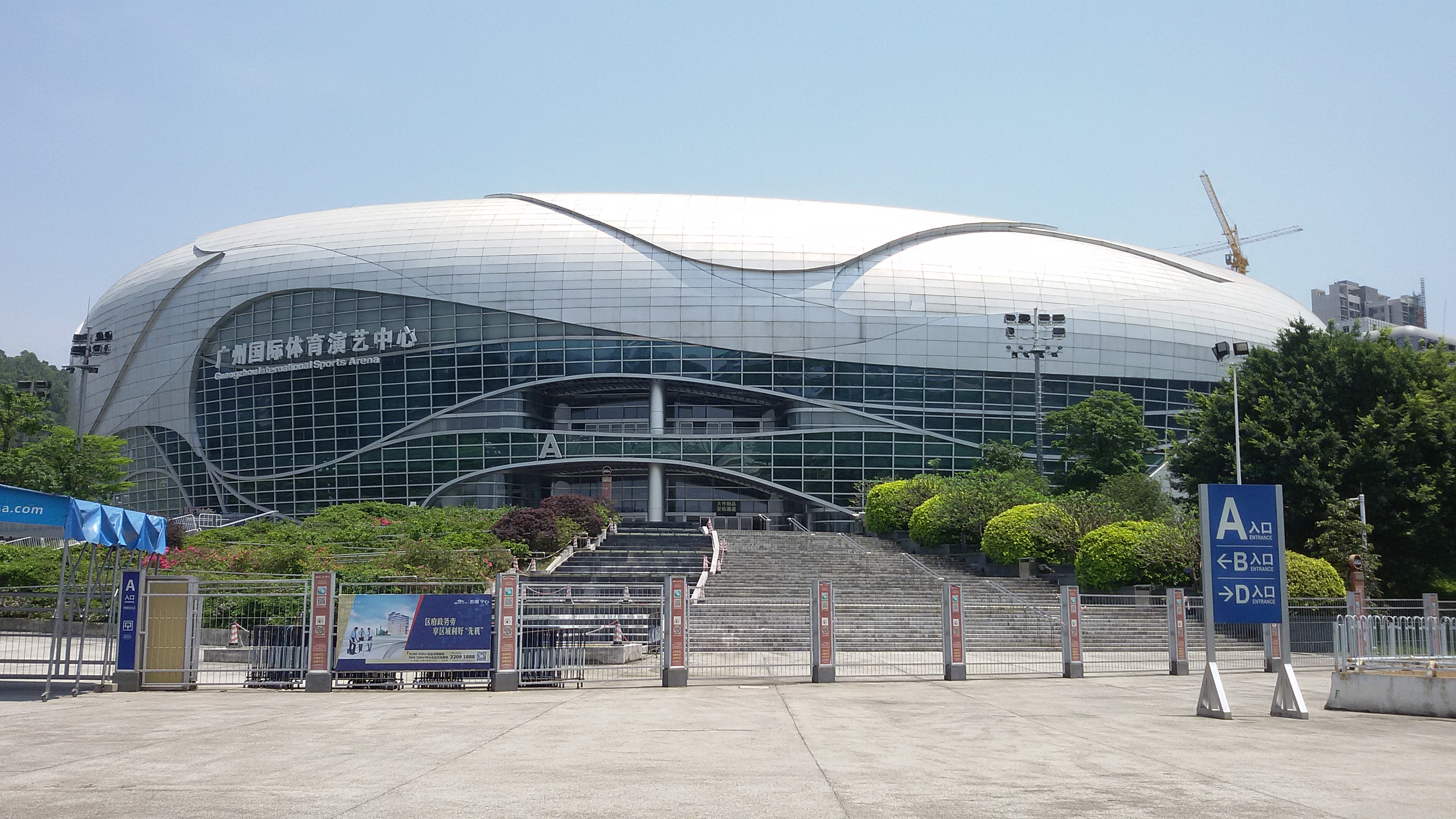
- Interactive map of Guangzhou International Sports Arena
- Location: Huangpu District, Guangzhou, China
- Coordinates: 23.179718°N 113.481195°E
- Owner: Guangzhou Entertainment District
- Capacity: 18,000
- Public transit: Luogang 6 7

Construction
- Groundbreaking: October 15, 2008
- Opened: September 30, 2010
- Architect: MANICA Architecture with Guangzhou Design Institute

Guangzhou International Sports Arena (Chinese: 广州国际体育演艺中心) is an indoor arena located in Guangzhou, China that was completed in September 2010. It is used mostly for basketball and it has a seating capacity of 18,000 spectators. On October 16, 2010, it hosted an NBA pre-season game between the New Jersey Nets and Houston Rockets. A sellout crowd attended this game as Houston beat New Jersey, 95–86.

== History ==
Designed by MANICA Architecture in partnership with the Guangzhou Design Institute, the Guangzhou Arena not only hosted the Asian Games events in 2010, but is home to a wide variety of events such as basketball, international ice events, and major music concerts. The building's design also specifically accommodates the standards of the NBA, a feature that will allow it to become home to the league's expansion throughout Asia.

The arena is planned as part of a larger Sport and Entertainment District in the heart of the new Luogang District to the East of downtown Guangzhou.

== Notable events ==
On 23 September 2011, Irish vocal pop band Westlife held a concert for Gravity Tour supporting their album Gravity.

On 18 April 2015, American singer-songwriter Katy Perry performed her first show of her Asian leg of the Prismatic World Tour at the arena. This was also her very first show in China.

On 3 June 2017, Joker Xue, a Chinese singer-songwriter, headlined the arena as part of his I Think I've Seen You Somewhere Tour.

On 30 August 2017, Ariana Grande performed at this arena for the first time as part of the Dangerous Woman Tour.

== See also ==
- List of indoor arenas in China
