= Hamed Sohrabnejad =

Iranian basketball player (born 1983)

Zob Ahan
- Position: Power forward
- League: Iranian League

Personal information
- Born: May 7, 1983 (age 43) Sanandaj, Iran
- Listed height: 6 ft 9 in (2.06 m)
- Listed weight: 209 lb (95 kg)

Career history
- –04: Paykan
- 2004–: Saba Battery
- –09: Mahram
- 2008: → Petrochimi
- 2009–10: Shahrdari Gorgan
- 2010: → Mahram
- 2010–2015: Petrochimi
- 2015–2016: Shahrdari Gorgan
- 2016–2017: Shahrdari Arak
- 2017–2018: Azad University
- 2018–2019: Shahrdari Gorgan
- 2019–2020: Mahram
- 2020–2021: Naft Abadan
- 2021–2022: Zob Ahan

Hamed Sohrabnejad
Medal record

Men's basketball

Representing Iran

Asian Games
Bronze medal – third place	2010 Guangzhou	Team

Asian Championship
Gold medal – first place	2009 Tianjin	Team
Gold medal – first place	2013 Manila	Team

Hamed Sohrabnejad (Persian: حامد سهراب‌نژاد, born May 7, 1983, in Sanandaj, Iran) is a professional Iranian basketball player who plays for Zob Ahan of the Iranian Super League and also the Iranian national basketball team. He is 6'9" in height.

== Honours ==
=== National team ===
- Asian Championship
  - Gold medal: 2009, 2013
- Asian Games
  - Bronze medal: 2010
- Islamic Solidarity Games
  - Bronze medal: 2005

=== Club ===
- Asian Championship
  - Gold medal: 2009, 2010 (Mahram)
- West Asian Championship
  - Gold medal: 2009 (Mahram)
- Iranian Basketball Super League
  - Champions: 2008, 2009 (Mahram)
