= Oshin Sahakian =

Iranian basketball player

No. 11 – Petrochimi
- Position: Power forward
- League: IBSL

Personal information
- Born: March 21, 1986 (age 40) Isfahan, Iran
- Listed height: 6 ft 7 in (2.01 m)
- Listed weight: 230 lb (104 kg)

Career information
- Playing career: 2004–present

Career history
- 2004–2012: Zob Ahan
- 2012–2013: Foolad Mahan
- 2013–2015: Mahram Tehran
- 2015–2016: Chemidor Tehran
- 2016–2018: Petrochimi

Oshin Sahakian (Persian: اوشین ساهاکیان, Armenian: Օշին Սահակյան; born March 21, 1986) is a professional Iranian basketball player of Persian and Armenian descent who plays for Petrochimi of the Iranian Super League and also the Iranian national basketball team.

== Honours ==
=== National team ===
- Asian Championship
  - Gold medal: 2007, 2009, 2013
- Asian Games
  - Silver medal: 2014
  - Bronze medal: 2010
- Asian Under-20 Championship
  - Gold medal: 2004
- Asian Under-18 Championship
  - Gold medal: 2004
  - Silver medal: 2002
- Asian Indoor Games
  - Gold medal: 2009
