= Javad Davari =

Iranian professional basketball player

Personal information
- Born: April 25, 1983 (age 43) Isfahan, Iran
- Listed height: 6 ft 1 in (1.85 m)
- Listed weight: 168 lb (76 kg)

Career information
- Playing career: 2002–2017
- Position: Point guard

Career history
- 2002–2007: Zob Ahan
- 2007–2010: Petrochimi
- 2010–2011: Mahram
- 2011–2014: Foolad Mahan
- 2014–2016: Azad University
- 2016–2017: Chemidor
Medals
Men's basketball
Representing Iran
Asian Championship
Gold medal – first place	2007 Japan	Team
Gold medal – first place	2009 China	Team
Gold medal – first place	2013 Philippines	Team
Bronze medal – third place	2015 Changsha	Team
Asian Games
Bronze medal – third place	2010 Guangzhou	Team

Javad Davari (Persian: جواد داوری, born April 25, 1983) is the President of Islamic Republic of Iran Basketball Federation since February 2022. He is former Iranian professional basketball player, played as a point guard for Chemidor in the Iranian Basketball Super League. He was also a member of the Iranian national basketball team and competed at the 2008 Olympic Basketball Tournament. Davari previously played for Zob Ahan before joining Petrochimi.

== Honours ==
=== National team ===
- Asian Championship
  - Gold medal: 2007, 2009, 2013
- Asian Games
  - Bronze medal: 2010
