= Li Xiaoxu =

Chinese basketball player

Li Xiaoxu 李晓旭
Personal information
- Born: 5 June 1990 (age 36) Huludao, Liaoning, China
- Listed height: 6 ft 9 1/2 in (2.07 m)
- Listed weight: 207 lb (94 kg)

Career information
- Playing career: 2005–2026
- Position: Power forward

Career history

Playing
- 2005–2026: Liaoning Flying Leopards

Coaching
- 2025–2026: Liaoning Flying Leopards (assistant)

Career highlights
- 3× CBA champion (2018, 2022, 2023, 2024)
Medals
Men's basketball
Representing China
FIBA Asia Championship
Silver medal – second place	2009 Tianjin
Asian Games
Gold medal – first place	2010 Guangzhou
FIBA Asia Under-18 Championship
Gold medal – first place	2006 Urumqi

Li Xiaoxu (Chinese: 李晓旭; pinyin: Lǐ Xiǎoxù) is a Chinese retired basketball player who mainly played for Liaoning Flying Leopards in the Chinese Basketball Association.

On 3 May 2026, Li decided to retire from professional basketball.

== Career statistics ==
=== CBA statistics ===
Year	Team	GP	RPG	APG	FG%	FT%	PPG
2005–06	Liaoning	25	2.3	0.2	.481	.593	3.6
2006–07	Liaoning	37	5.0	0.7	.546	.722	7.1
2007–08	Liaoning	43	6.4	1.4	.548	.647	9.8
2008–09	Liaoning	50	7.5	0.9	.568	.620	13.6
2009–10	Liaoning	36	8.5	1.8	.471	.649	15.5
2010–11	Liaoning	30	10.5	1.6	.455	.518	9.8
2011–12	Liaoning	32	10.8	1.0	.442	.567	10.9
2012–13	Liaoning	37	12.5	2.4	.489	.557	14.8
2013–14	Liaoning	36	9.0	1.2	.428	.514	8.8
2014–15	Liaoning	49	8.7	1.2	.421	.395	8.3
Career		375	8.1	1.2	.485	.578	10.2
