= Lee Seung-jun (basketball) =

American basketball player

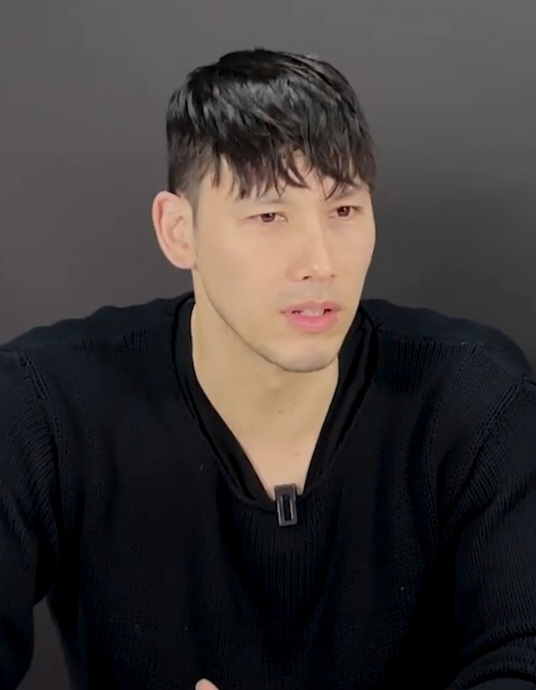
- Lee in 2021

Personal information
- Born: 18 March 1978 (age 48) United States
- Listed height: 6 ft 8 in (2.03 m)
- Listed weight: 225 lb (102 kg)

Career information
- High school: Shorecrest (Shoreline, Washington)
- College: Portland (1997–1999); Seattle Pacific (2000–2002)
- NBA draft: 2002: undrafted
- Position: Power forward

Career history
- 2005–2006: Bellingham Slam
- 2006–2007: CAB Madeira
- 2007–2008: Ulsan Mobis Phoebus
- 2008–2009: Singapore Slingers
- 2009: Élan Chalon
- 2009–2012: Seoul Samsung Thunders
- 2012–2014: Wonju Dongbu Promy
- 2015–2016: Seoul SK Knights
- 2016: Alab Pilipinas
Medals
Representing South Korea
Men's basketball
Asian Games
Silver medal – second place	2010 Guangzhou	Team
FIBA Asia Championship
Bronze medal – third place	2013 Manila	Team

- Lee Seung-jun
- Hangul: 이승준
- RR: I Seungjun
- MR: I Sŭngjun

Lee Seung-Jun (born Eric Lee Sandrin; 18 May 1978) is an American-born South Korean professional basketball player. He last played for Alab Pilipinas of the ASEAN Basketball League.

== Career ==
Lee's basketball career took him around the world, including two years in Luxembourg and one in Brazil. He later returned to the United States, and was playing for the Bellingham Slam in 2005 when he caught the attention of scouts for the Harlem Globetrotters, and signed for a season with them. On the team, he acquired the nickname "Shanghai". That year, he also played for the Los Angeles Lakers in the NBA Summer League and the Sacramento Kings in the NBA preseason. He went on to play for the Singapore Slingers, where he was noted for a September 2008 incident in which his trash-talking provoked members of the opposing Air21 Express team to violence; Ranidel de Ocampo deliberately walked under him during a dunk to cause him to lose his balance and fall over, while Homer Se later kicked him in the head and was ejected from the game. He played for South Korea at the 2010 Asian Games and the 2013 FIBA Asia Championship.

In mid-November 2016, Alab Pilipinas of the ASEAN Basketball League announced that they have signed Lee.

== Personal life ==
Lee grew up in the Pacific Northwest. His mother is Korean. His younger brother Daniel Sandrin also plays in the Korean Basketball League, for the Seoul Samsung Thunders under the name Lee Dong-Jun. He became a South Korean citizen in 2009, relinquishing his United States citizenship in the process. Lee is fluent in both Korean and English, and is a Chili's restaurant afficionado.

== See also ==
- List of former United States citizens who relinquished their nationality
