= Wang Shipeng =

Chinese basketball player

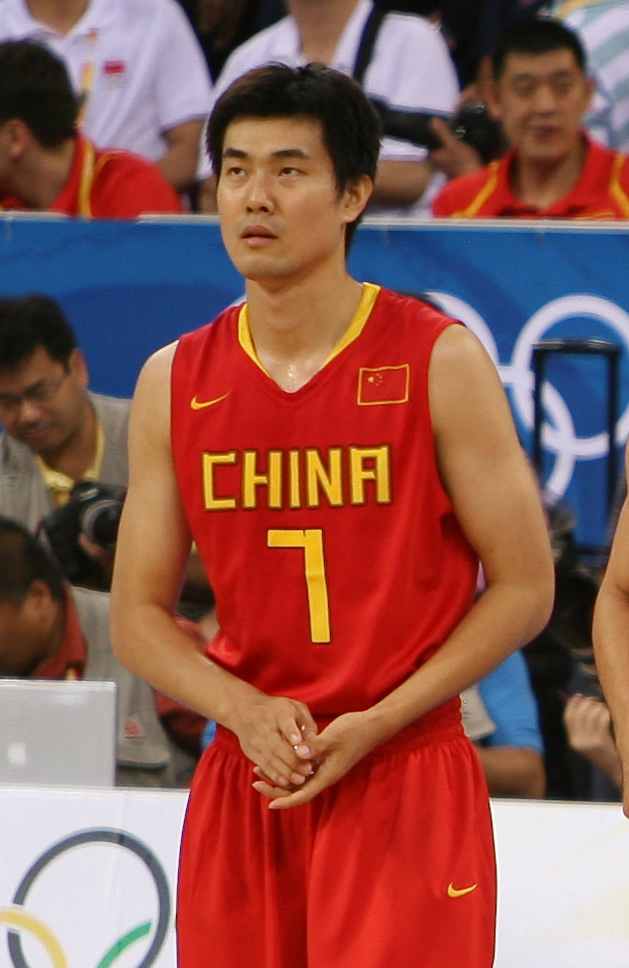
- Wang with China at the 2008 Olympics

Personal information
- Born: April 6, 1983 (age 43) Dandong, Liaoning, China
- Listed height: 6 ft 6 in (1.98 m)
- Listed weight: 212 lb (96 kg)

Career information
- Playing career: 2000–2016
- Position: Shooting guard / small forward

Career history
- 2000–2016: Guangdong Southern Tigers

Career highlights
- 8× CBA champion (2003–2006, 2008–2011, 2013); CBA Finals MVP (2011)
Medals
Men's basketball
Representing China
FIBA Asia Cup
Silver medal – second place	2009 Tianjin
Asian Games
Gold medal – first place	2006 Doha
Gold medal – first place	2010 Guangzhou
East Asian Games
Bronze medal – third place	2005 Macau

Wang Shipeng, (simplified Chinese: 王仕鹏; traditional Chinese: 王仕鵬; pinyin: Wáng Shìpéng; born April 6, 1983, in Dandong, Liaoning) (nickname: Wang 7 王七)is a former professional basketball player from the People's Republic of China. At a height of 1.98 m (6 ft 6 in), and a weight of 96 kg (212 lb), he played mainly at the shooting guard position, but he could also play as a small forward.

== Professional career ==
Wang played for the Guangdong Southern Tigers, a Chinese Basketball Association (CBA) team based in Guangzhou. Wang was the Chinese Basketball Association's Finals MVP in 2011.

== National team career ==
Wang was a primary 3 point shooter (along with Fangyu Zhu) in the Chinese National Team. Wang made a 3-point shot at the buzzer, which helped China beat Slovenia 78–77, in the last game of group D, in the 2006 FIBA World Championship. China advanced to the tournament's final 16 with the win. He also competed at the 2008 Summer Olympics and at the 2012 Summer Olympics.
