= 2013 FIBA Asia Championship Group E =

Group E of the 2013 FIBA Asia Championship will take place from 5 to 7 August 2013. This is the second round of the 2013 FIBA Asia Championship. The four teams with the best record advance to 2013 FIBA Asia Championship final round.

All games will be played at the Mall of Asia Arena in Pasay, Philippines. The competing teams are top three teams in Group A and Group B.

Group A

Team	Pld	W	L	PF	PA	PD	Pts
Chinese Taipei	3	3	0	265	233	+32	6
Philippines	3	2	1	234	221	+13	5
Jordan	3	1	2	221	215	+6	4
Saudi Arabia	3	0	3	180	231	−51	3

Group B

Team	Pld	W	L	PF	PA	PD	Pts
Qatar	2	2	0	162	138	+24	4
Japan	2	1	1	150	134	+16	3
Hong Kong	2	0	2	123	163	−40	2

== Standings ==
Qualified for the Final Round
Relegated to 9th–12th Classification

The results and the points of the matches between the same teams that were already played during the preliminary round shall be taken into account for the second round.

Team	Pld	W	L	PF	PA	PD	Pts	Tie
Philippines	5	4	1	393	351	+42	9	1–1, 1.03
Chinese Taipei	5	4	1	416	368	+48	9	1–1, 1.01
Qatar	5	4	1	378	347	+31	9	1–1, 0.95
Jordan	5	2	3	364	353	+11	7	
Japan	5	1	4	353	368	−15	6	
Hong Kong	5	0	5	287	404	−117	5	

All times are local (UTC+8).

== August 5 ==
=== Qatar vs. Jordan ===
5 August 2013
10:30

Report

Qatar	75–61	Jordan
Scoring by quarter: 23–23, 19–15, 19–14, 14–9
Pts: Hayes 15; Rebs: Y. Musa, Saeed 7 Asts: D. Musa 5		Pts: Hadrab 16; Rebs: Al-Sous 6 Asts: Al-Sous, Alhamarsheh 7

Mall of Asia Arena, Pasay
Referees: Chong Yun Aun (MAS), Snehal Bendke (IND), Wang Xiao Chun (CHN)

Qatar
#	Player	Min	FG		3FG		FT		REB			AST	PF	TO	STL	BS	Pts
#	Player	Min	M/A	%	M/A	%	M/A	%	OFF	DEF	TOT	AST	PF	TO	STL	BS	Pts
4	Mansour El Hadary	16:57	4/7	57	1/2	50	1/2	50	0	3	3	1	0	0	0	3	10
5	Jarvis Hayes	32:36	6/14	43	2/6	33	1/2	50	1	3	4	3	1	1	0	4	15
6	Abdulrahman Saad	1:39	0/1	0	0/1	0	0/0	0	0	1	1	0	0	0	0	0	0
7	Daoud Musa	29:19	4/8	50	2/6	33	3/3	100	2	1	3	5	2	0	1	2	13
8	Khalid Suliman	19:14	1/4	25	0/2	0	0/2	0	0	4	4	1	1	1	1	0	2
9	Ali Turki Ali	19:53	1/6	17	1/5	20	2/2	100	1	2	3	1	1	0	0	2	5
10	Yasseen Musa	31:56	6/11	55	0/1	0	2/4	50	2	5	7	3	0	0	0	1	14
11	Erfan Ali Saeed	32:52	4/10	40	0/1	0	3/4	75	3	4	7	2	1	0	2	1	11
12	Mohammed Saleem Abdulla	05:03	1/1	100	0/0	0	0/1	0	0	0	0	0	0	0	0	1	2
13	Mohammed Yousef	08:23	1/3	3	1/3	33	0/0	0	0	2	2	0	0	0	0	2	3
14	Malek Saleem	2:04	0/0	0	0/0	0	0/0	0	0	0	0	0	0	0	0	0	0
15	Baker Ahmad Mohammed	Did not play															
Totals			28/65	43	7-27	26	12/20	60	9	25	34	16	6	2	4	16	75

Jordan
#	Player	Min	FG		3FG		FT		REB			AST	PF	TO	STL	BS	Pts
#	Player	Min	M/A	%	M/A	%	M/A	%	OFF	DEF	TOT	AST	PF	TO	STL	BS	Pts
4	Fadel Al-Najjar	5:32	0/0	0	0/0	0	0/0	0	1	0	1	1	1	0	0	0	0
5	Ahmad Al-Dwairi	9:21	0/2	0	0/0	0	2/4	50	2	1	3	0	0	0	1	0	2
6	Hani Alfaraj	15:32	2/3	67	1/1	100	0/0	0	0	1	1	0	0	1	0	2	5
7	Ahmad Alhamarsheh	30:32	1/3	33	0/1	0	0/0	0	2	5	7	1	3	1	0	2	2
8	Jimmy Baxter	38:14	5/17	29	1/4	25	1/2	50	1	3	4	2	0	0	0	0	12
9	Khaldoon Abu-Ruqayyah	9:08	1/3	33	1/3	33	0/0	0	1	1	2	0	1	0	0	2	3
10	Abdallah AbuQoura	Did not play															
11	Wesam Al-Sous	29:52	4/9	44	4/8	50	2/2	100	2	5	7	6	0	0	0	2	14
12	Mahmoud Abdeen	4:35	0/1	0	0/1	0	0/0	0	0	1	1	1	0	0	0	0	1
13	Mohammad Shaher Hussein	12:25	1/4	25	0/1	0	1/2	50	0	4	4	0	1	0	0	1	3
14	Mohammad Hadrab	28:18	6/16	38	0/3	0	4/4	100	2	2	4	1	1	0	2	5	16
15	Ali Jamal Zaghab	16:26	2/4	50	0/0	0	0/0	0	1	3	4	0	0	0	0	1	4
Totals			22/62	35	7/22	32	10/14	71	12	26	38	12	10	2	3	17	61

=== Chinese Taipei vs. Hong Kong ===
5 August 2013
15:00

Report

Chinese Taipei	94–55	Hong Kong
Scoring by quarter: 19–19, 24–13, 31–11, 20–12
Pts: Chen S.C. 13; Rebs: Davis, Creighton 7 Asts: Lu C.J. 6		Pts: S.Y. Fong 13; Rebs: S.Y. Fong 15; Asts: three players 2

Mall of Asia Arena, Pasay
Referees: Mohd. AlAmiri (KUW), Amirhossein Safarzadeh (IRI), Atanu Banerjee (IND)

Chinese Taipei
#	Player	Min	FG		3FG		FT		REB			AST	PF	TO	STL	BS	Pts
#	Player	Min	M/A	%	M/A	%	M/A	%	OFF	DEF	TOT	AST	PF	TO	STL	BS	Pts
4	Tseng Wen-ting	6:50	1/2	50	0/1	0	0/0	0	0	0	0	0	2	0	0	2	2
5	Quincy Davis	20:50	3/4	75	0/0	0	3/4	75	1	6	7	1	4	1	3	0	9
6	Lee Hsueh-lin	Did not play															
7	Tien Lei	20:00	5/9	56	2/4	50	0/0	0	0	4	4	3	2	0	0	1	12
8	Chen Shih-chieh	18:46	4/5	80	1/1	100	4/4	100	0	3	3	4	0	3	0	1	13
9	Hung Chih-shan	21:13	3/7	43	1/4	25	0/0	0	0	6	6	1	1	1	0	4	7
10	Chou Po-Chen	14:47	3-4	75	1-1	100	0-1	0	0	2	2	1	2	2	2	3	7
11	Yang Chin-min	26:24	4-9	44	2-4	50	0-0	0	0	3	3	3	1	0	0	3	10
12	Lin Chih-chieh	13:35	2-5	40	1-4	25	1-2	50	0	3	3	6	0	0	0	0	6
13	Lu Cheng-ju	16:55	3-5	60	3-4	75	2-2	100	0	1	1	2	1	0	0	0	11
14	Tsai Wen-cheng	23:04	2-4	50	0-0	0	2-3	67	2	2	4	1	1	0	0	1	6
15	Douglas Creighton	17:31	4-5	80	3-4	75	0-0	0	1	6	7	2	0	0	0	0	11
Totals			34-59	58	14-27	52	12-16	75	4	36	40	24	14	7	5	15	94

Hong Kong
#	Player	Min	FG		3FG		FT		REB			AST	PF	TO	STL	BS	Pts
#	Player	Min	M/A	%	M/A	%	M/A	%	OFF	DEF	TOT	AST	PF	TO	STL	BS	Pts
4	Man Chun Lam	06:38	1-2	50	0-1	0	1-2	50	0	0	0	1	0	0	0	1	3
5	Tsz Lai Lau	19:09	1-6	17	1-6	17	0-0	0	0	1	1	1	0	0	0	1	3
6	Ki Lee	15:48	2-8	25	1-3	33	0-0	0	0	1	1	1	1	0	0	2	5
7	Kim Wong Li	27:56	2-8	25	0-3	0	0-2	0	2	1	3	2	4	0	0	3	4
8	Siu Wing Chan	24:58	1-6	17	1-5	20	0-0	0	1	4	5	2	1	1	0	1	3
9	Tung Leung Lau	11:12	2-3	67	0-0	0	0-0	0	0	0	0	0	3	0	0	1	4
10	Yik Lun Chan	21:04	3-7	43	3-5	60	0-0	0	0	1	1	1	0	0	0	1	9
11	Chi Ho Poon	Did not play															
12	Shing Yee Fong	24:12	5-13	38	1-2	50	2-2	100	7	8	15	2	2	0	0	3	13
13	Chun Wai Wong	19:49	1-8	13	0-4	0	0-0	0	0	4	4	1	1	1	0	4	2
14	Duncan Overbeck Reid	29:08	3-10	30	0-0	0	3-4	75	1	3	4	1	3	1	0	0	9
15	Wai Kit Szeto	Did not play															
Totals			21-71	30	7-29	24	6-10	60	11	23	34	12	15	3	0	17	55

=== Philippines vs. Japan ===
5 August 2013
20:30

Report

Philippines	90–71	Japan
Scoring by quarter: 17–14, 29–22, 29–15, 15–20
Pts: Douthit 19; Rebs: Douthit 10; Asts: Alapag 6		Pts: Sakuragi 19; Rebs: Sakuragi 13; Asts: three players 3

Mall of Asia Arena, Pasay
Referees: Arsen Andryushkin (KAZ), Yevgeniy Mikheyev (KAZ), Peng Ling (CHN)

Philippines
#	Player	Min	FG		3FG		FT		REB			AST	PF	TO	STL	BS	Pts
#	Player	Min	M/A	%	M/A	%	M/A	%	OFF	DEF	TOT	AST	PF	TO	STL	BS	Pts
4	Jimmy Alapag	15	2/3	67	2/3	67	0/0	0	0	3	3	6	2	1	0	0	6
5	LA Tenorio	15	1/7	14	1/3	33	6/7	88	0	3	3	2	1	2	2	0	9
6	Jeffrei Chan	19	6/7	86	4/5	80	0/0	0	0	1	1	1	2	3	0	0	16
7	Jayson William	18	2/9	22	0/1	0	3/3	100	0	0	0	3	2	0	2	0	7
8	Gary David	12	2/5	40	1-3	33	0/0	0	0	0	0	0	1	0	0	0	5
9	Ranidel de Ocampo	11	3/4	75	0/3	0	0/0	0	1	1	2	2	0	0	2	0	9
10	Gabe Norwood	18	0/0	0	2/2	100	3/4	75	0	3	3	2	3	0	1	0	7
11	Marcus Douthit	25	0/0	0	7/14	50	5/5	100	0	10	10	3	2	2	2	2	19
12	Larry Fonacier	23	1/1	100	0/1	0	0/0	0	1	3	4	2	1	0	0	0	3
13	June Mar Fajardo	04	0/0	0	0/1	0	0/0	0	0	0	0	0	2	0	0	1	0
14	Japeth Aguilar	17	3/3	75	0	100	1/2	50	1	0	1	0	3	0	0	1	7
15	Marc Pingris	22	0/0	0	1/1	100	0/0	0	1	1	2	3	3	1	2	1	2
Totals		200	30/61	49	12/20	44	18/21	86	5	25	30	24	22	10	11	5	90

Japan
#	Player	Min	FG		3FG		FT		REB			AST	PF	TO	STL	BS	Pts
#	Player	Min	M/A	%	M/A	%	M/A	%	OFF	DEF	TOT	AST	PF	TO	STL	BS	Pts
4	Keijuro Matsui	14	2/5	40	2/5	20	0/0	0	0	2	2	1	0	1	0	0	6
5	Daiki Tanaka	02	0/0	0	0/0	0	0/0	0	0	0	0	0	0	1	0	0	0
6	Makoto Hiejima	18	3/11	27	1/3	33	2/2	100	3	2	5	3	3	1	2	0	9
7	Atsuya Ota	6	1/4	25	0/0	0	0/0	0	3	1	4	1	0	2	0	0	2
8	Yuta Watanabe	5	1/3	33	0/0	0	0/0	0	0	0	0	0	1	0	0	0	2
9	Takahiro Kurihara	22	1/4	25	0/1	0	0/0	0	0	1	1	3	3	0	0	0	2
10	Kosuke Takeuchi	32	7/11	64	0/1	0	3/4	75	2	7	9	0	2	2	0	2	17
11	Ryota Sakurai	16	0/2	0	0/0	0	2/2	100	1	2	3	0	4	3	0	0	2
12	J.R. Sakuragi	30	6/14	43	1/1	100	6/7	86	6	7	13	3	1	2	0	1	19
13	Naoto Tsuji	27	3/7	43	2/4	50	0/0	0	0	1	1	1	1	4	0	0	8
14	Kosuke Kanamaru	22	2/8	25	0/3	0	0/0	0	1	1	2	0	1	2	0	0	4
15	Hiroshi Ichioka	7	0/1	0	0/0	0	0/0	0	1	1	2	0	3	0	0	1	0
Totals		200	26/70	37	6/18	33	13/15	87	21	27	48	12	19	19	2	4	71

== August 6 ==
=== Jordan vs. Hong Kong ===
6 August 2013
10:30

Report

Jordan	80–54	Hong Kong
Scoring by quarter: 18–9, 19–15, 26–16, 17–14
Pts: Hadrab 21; Rebs: Al-Dwairi, Hussein 8 Asts: Al-Najjar 5		Pts: S. Y. Fong 10; Rebs: C. W. Wong 6 Asts: S. W. Chan 3

Mall of Asia Arena, Pasay
Referees: Snehal Bendke (IND), Atanu Banerjee (IND), Tan Chin Siong (MAS)

Jordan
#	Player	Min	FG		3FG		FT		REB			AST	PF	TO	STL	BS	Pts
#	Player	Min	M/A	%	M/A	%	M/A	%	OFF	DEF	TOT	AST	PF	TO	STL	BS	Pts
4	Fadel Al-Najjar	22:34	3-10	30	0-7	0	1-4	25	0	5	5	5	1	1	0	2	7
5	Ahmad Al-Dwairi	18:35	1-1	100	0-0	0	2-2	100	4	4	8	0	2	0	1	4	4
6	Hani Alfaraj	17:21	2-4	50	0-2	0	0-0	0	3	1	4	0	2	1	0	0	4
7	Ahmad Alhamarsheh	18:51	2-4	50	1-2	50	2-2	100	0	4	4	4	2	0	0	0	7
8	Jimmy Baxter	21:11	1-6	17	0-3	0	0-0	0	0	2	2	3	3	1	0	0	2
9	Khaldoon Abu-Ruqayyah	Did not play															
10	Abdallah AbuQoura	19:34	3-6	50	0-1	0	0-0	0	3	1	4	0	1	0	0	0	6
11	Wesam Al-Sous	16:18	3-8	38	2-5	40	0-0	0	0	4	4	1	2	0	0	1	8
12	Mahmoud Abdeen	23:41	5-12	42	2-5	40	1-1	100	1	3	4	1	2	1	0	3	13
13	Mohammad Shaher Hussein	21:24	3-8	38	0-1	0	2-2	100	4	4	8	1	2	2	0	1	8
14	Mohammad Hadrab	20:25	7-10	70	2-2	100	5-6	83	3	4	7	2	0	0	0	1	21
15	Ali Jamal Zaghab	Did not play															
Totals			30-69	43	7-28	25	13-17	76	18	32	50	17	17	6	1	12	80

Hong Kong
#	Player	Min	FG		3FG		FT		REB			AST	PF	TO	STL	BS	Pts
#	Player	Min	M/A	%	M/A	%	M/A	%	OFF	DEF	TOT	AST	PF	TO	STL	BS	Pts
4	Man Chun Lam	18:30	2-5	40	1-3	33	2-2	100	3	2	5	2	2	0	0	3	7
5	Tsz Lai Lau	16:11	2-6	33	2-4	50	0-0	0	1	1	2	2	1	0	0	0	6
6	Ki Lee	24:09	3-8	38	1-5	20	0-0	0	2	1	3	2	1	0	0	3	7
7	Kim Wong Li	18:07	1-4	25	0-1	0	2-2	100	0	1	1	1	4	0	0	1	4
8	Siu Wing Chan	24:59	2-7	29	1-4	25	0-0	0	1	1	2	3	1	3	0	0	5
9	Tung Leung Lau	21:31	3-8	38	0-0	0	2-2	100	2	2	4	1	4	0	0	1	8
10	Yik Lun Chan	04:49	0-4	0	0-2	0	0-0	0	1	2	3	0	0	0	0	0	0
11	Chi Ho Poon	Did not play															
12	Shing Yee Fong	24:26	5-10	50	0-0	0	0-0	0	1	2	3	1	4	1	1	5	10
13	Chun Wai Wong	23:52	1-6	17	0-2	0	0-1	0	1	5	6	1	1	0	0	3	2
14	Duncan Overbeck Reid	19:34	2-6	33	0-0	0	1-2	50	1	0	1	0	0	0	1	0	5
15	Wai Kit Szeto	03:46	0-0	0	0-0	0	0-0	0	0	0	0	0	0	0	0	0	0
Totals			21-64	33	5-21	24	7-9	78	13	17	30	13	18	4	2	16	54

=== Japan vs. Chinese Taipei ===
6 August 2013
15:00

Report

Japan	76–79	Chinese Taipei
Scoring by quarter: 25–22, 16–22, 18–17, 17–18
Pts: Takeuchi 17; Rebs: Sakuragi 12; Asts: Sakurai 8		Pts: Tseng 19; Rebs: Davis 12; Asts: Tien 5

Mall of Asia Arena, Pasay
Referees: Arsen Andryushkin (KAZ), Peng Ling (CHN), Amirhossein Safarzadeh (IRI)

Japan
#	Player	Min	FG		3FG		FT		REB			AST	PF	TO	STL	BS	Pts
#	Player	Min	M/A	%	M/A	%	M/A	%	OFF	DEF	TOT	AST	PF	TO	STL	BS	Pts
4	Keijuro Matsui	Did not play															
5	Daiki Tanaka	17:02	3-6	50	2-2	100	0-0	0	1	1	2	0	0	0	0	3	8
6	Makoto Hiejima	04:04	0-1	0	0-1	0	0-0	0	0	0	0	1	1	0	0	2	0
7	Atsuya Ota	04:03	1-1	100	0-0	0	0-0	0	1	0	1	0	0	0	0	0	2
8	Yuta Watanabe	Did not play															
9	Takahiro Kurihara	15:16	2-2	100	0-0	0	1-2	50	2	0	2	0	0	1	0	1	5
10	Kosuke Takeuchi	35:56	7-17	41	0-1	0	3-5	60	2	5	7	2	2	1	1	2	17
11	Ryota Sakurai	34:08	5-7	71	1-2	50	2-2	100	1	3	4	8	3	0	1	2	13
12	J.R. Sakuragi	32:49	5-11	45	0-1	0	0-0	0	2	10	12	4	3	0	0	4	10
13	Naoto Tsuji	17:09	1-7	14	1-6	17	3-3	100	0	1	1	2	0	1	0	4	6
14	Kosuke Kanamaru	32:18	5-12	42	1-6	17	3-4	75	0	2	2	1	1	1	0	0	14
15	Hiroshi Ichioka	07:10	0-0	0	0-0	0	1-2	50	1	1	2	1	0	0	0	4	1
Totals			29-64	45	5-19	26	13-18	72	10	23	33	19	10	4	2	22	76

Chinese Taipei
#	Player	Min	FG		3FG		FT		REB			AST	PF	TO	STL	BS	Pts
#	Player	Min	M/A	%	M/A	%	M/A	%	OFF	DEF	TOT	AST	PF	TO	STL	BS	Pts
4	Tseng Wen-ting	22:26	6-10	60	2-3	67	5-7	71	2	2	4	1	2	0	1	0	19
5	Quincy Davis	29:58	3-10	30	0-0	0	2-2	100	4	8	12	1	1	0	0	0	8
6	Lee Hsueh-lin	16:21	0-0	0	0-0	0	0-0	0	1	2	3	1	0	0	0	3	0
7	Tien Lei	27:29	5-12	42	0-3	0	0-0	0	1	5	6	5	0	1	0	4	10
8	Chen Shih-chieh	21:17	3-12	25	0-3	0	4-4	100	3	2	5	1	0	1	0	0	10
9	Hung Chih-shan	02:24	0-1	0	0-0	0	0-0	0	0	0	0	0	0	0	0	1	0
10	Chou Po-Chen	00:02	0-0	0	0-0	0	0-0	0	0	0	0	0	0	0	0	0	0
11	Yang Chin-min	23:31	1-4	25	1-2	50	0-0	0	1	2	3	2	0	1	0	4	3
12	Lin Chih-chieh	27:24	5-11	45	2-7	29	4-5	80	2	4	6	1	5	0	0	2	16
13	Lu Cheng-ju	12:56	2-4	50	1-3	33	1-1	100	0	0	0	0	3	2	0	3	6
14	Tsai Wen-cheng	16:03	1-3	33	0-0	0	5-5	100	3	2	5	0	2	1	0	1	7
15	Douglas Creighton	00:02	0-0	0	0-0	0	0-0	0	0	0	0	0	0	0	0	0	0
Totals			26-67	39	6-21	29	21-24	88	17	27	44	12	13	6	1	18	79

=== Philippines vs. Qatar ===
6 August 2013
20:30

Report

Philippines	80–70	Qatar
Scoring by quarter: 20–20, 27–9, 16–15, 17–26
Pts: Douthit 19; Rebs: Douthit 14; Asts: Douthit 4		Pts: Hayes 17; Rebs: Hayes 11; Asts: El Hadary 5

Mall of Asia Arena, Pasay
Referees: Harja Jaladri (INA), Yevgeniy Mikheyev (KAZ), Wang Mei (CHN)

Philippines
#	Player	Min	FG		3FG		FT		REB			AST	PF	TO	STL	BS	Pts
#	Player	Min	M/A	%	M/A	%	M/A	%	OFF	DEF	TOT	AST	PF	TO	STL	BS	Pts
4	Jimmy Alapag	09:27	1-5	20	1-4	25	2-2	100	0	2	2	2	2	0	0	2	5
5	LA Tenorio	16:16	2-7	29	1-5	20	2-2	100	1	3	4	3	0	0	0	3	7
6	Jeffrei Chan	27:23	4-7	57	3-5	60	1-2	50	0	6	6	1	0	0	0	1	12
7	Jayson William	14:22	1-4	25	0-1	0	5-5	100	1	3	4	1	1	0	0	0	7
8	Gary David	08:35	2-7	29	1-2	50	0-0	0	2	3	5	1	0	0	0	0	5
9	Ranidel de Ocampo	16:51	2-6	33	0-2	0	0-0	0	0	2	2	0	1	0	0	1	4
10	Gabe Norwood	27:49	1-3	33	1-2	50	0-0	0	0	2	2	1	1	0	2	0	3
11	Marcus Douthit	28:33	7-13	54	0-0	0	5-6	83	3	11	14	4	4	0	1	3	19
12	Larry Fonacier	11:32	0-4	0	0-3	0	2-2	100	0	1	1	0	1	0	0	2	2
13	June Mar Fajardo	02:08	0-0	0	0-0	0	0-0	0	0	0	0	0	0	0	0	1	0
14	Japeth Aguilar	17:35	5-6	83	0-0	0	4-5	80	2	5	7	0	0	0	1	3	14
15	Marc Pingris	19:23	1-3	33	0-0	0	0-0	0	1	5	6	0	2	0	1	2	2
Totals			26-65	40	7-24	29	21-24	88	10	43	53	13	12	0	5	18	80

Qatar
#	Player	Min	FG		3FG		FT		REB			AST	PF	TO	STL	BS	Pts
#	Player	Min	M/A	%	M/A	%	M/A	%	OFF	DEF	TOT	AST	PF	TO	STL	BS	Pts
4	Mansour El Hadary	25:51	2-8	25	0-2	0	1-2	50	1	3	4	5	1	0	0	4	5
5	Jarvis Hayes	35:18	7-17	41	2-4	50	1-4	25	2	9	11	1	1	0	0	0	17
6	Abdulrahman Saad	02:45	0-1	0	0-1	0	0-0	0	0	2	2	0	0	0	0	3	0
7	Daoud Musa	23:16	3-10	30	1-5	20	1-1	100	0	4	4	3	0	1	0	1	8
8	Khalid Suliman	17:13	2-9	22	2-4	50	3-6	50	4	0	4	1	2	0	0	3	9
9	Ali Turki Ali	09:47	0-4	0	0-3	0	0-0	0	0	0	0	0	0	0	0	0	0
10	Yasseen Musa	23:56	3-7	43	0-2	0	2-2	100	2	5	7	0	1	1	0	2	8
11	Erfan Ali Saeed	28:46	6-14	43	0-4	0	1-1	100	2	2	4	1	0	1	1	2	13
12	Mohammed Saleem Abdulla	06:07	1-2	50	0-0	0	0-0	0	0	0	0	0	0	0	0	1	2
13	Mohammed Yousef	10:26	1-1	100	0-0	0	2-2	100	1	2	3	1	0	1	0	3	4
14	Malek Saleem	06:04	0-1	0	0-1	0	0-0	0	0	0	0	0	0	0	0	0	0
15	Baker Ahmad Mohammed	10:27	1-5	20	0-0	0	2-2	100	0	2	2	1	1	0	0	0	4
Totals			26-79	33	5-26	19	13-20	65	12	29	41	13	6	4	1	19	70

== August 7 ==
=== Japan vs. Jordan ===
7 August 2013
10:30

Report

Japan	56–65	Jordan
Scoring by quarter: 13–15, 11–15, 11–15, 21–20
Pts: Tsuji 14; Rebs: Sakuragi 10; Asts: Hiejima 4		Pts: Baxter 16; Rebs: Hussein 19; Asts: Al-Sous 5

Mall of Asia Arena, Pasay
Referees: Arsen Andryushkin (KAZ), Yevgeniy Mikheyev (KAZ), Wang Mei (CHN)

Japan
#	Player	Min	FG		3FG		FT		REB			AST	PF	TO	STL	BS	Pts
#	Player	Min	M/A	%	M/A	%	M/A	%	OFF	DEF	TOT	AST	PF	TO	STL	BS	Pts
4	Keijuro Matsui	02:57	0-1	0	0-0	0	0-0	0	0	0	0	0	0	0	0	2	0
5	Daiki Tanaka	08:37	1-2	50	0-1	0	0-0	0	0	0	0	0	0	0	0	0	2
6	Makoto Hiejima	20:25	1-6	17	0-0	0	2-2	100	0	2	2	4	0	2	0	1	4
7	Atsuya Ota	Did not play															
8	Yuta Watanabe	Did not play															
9	Takahiro Kurihara	25:55	4-8	50	0-1	0	0-0	0	1	1	2	0	3	0	0	4	8
10	Kosuke Takeuchi	33:05	2-8	25	0-0	0	3-4	75	1	4	5	3	1	1	2	3	7
11	Ryota Sakuragi	22:23	1-2	50	0-1	0	2-6	33	2	1	3	3	2	0	0	4	4
12	J.R. Sakuragi	33:42	1-10	10	0-1	0	3-4	75	1	9	10	2	3	1	0	3	5
13	Naoto Tsuji	18:01	5-12	42	4-10	40	0-0	0	0	0	0	0	0	1	0	1	14
14	Kosuke Kanamaru	21:38	2-9	22	1-5	20	0-0	0	1	3	4	0	1	0	0	2	5
15	Hiroshi Ichioka	13:11	3-7	43	0-0	0	1-2	50	4	1	5	0	0	0	2	1	7
Totals			20-65	31	5-19	26	11-18	61	10	21	31	12	10	5	4	21	56

Jordan
#	Player	Min	FG		3FG		FT		REB			AST	PF	TO	STL	BS	Pts
#	Player	Min	M/A	%	M/A	%	M/A	%	OFF	DEF	TOT	AST	PF	TO	STL	BS	Pts
4	Fadel Al-Najjar	00:40	0-0	0	0-0	0	1-2	50	0	0	0	0	0	0	0	0	1
5	Ahmad Al-Dwairi	08:24	1-1	100	0-0	0	0-0	0	0	1	1	0	2	0	0	4	2
6	Hani Alfaraj	09:30	0-0	0	0-0	0	1-2	50	0	0	0	1	1	0	1	1	1
7	Ahmad Alhamarsheh	33:06	3-4	75	2-3	67	2-2	100	1	5	6	1	0	0	0	3	10
8	Jimmy Baxter	37:15	6-16	38	1-5	20	3-4	75	0	6	6	1	3	3	0	0	16
9	Khaldoon Abu-Ruqayyah	00:40	0-0	0	0-0	0	0-0	0	0	0	0	0	0	0	0	0	0
10	Abdallah AbuQoura	Did not play															
11	Wesam Al-Sous	30:42	3-11	27	1-8	13	2-4	50	0	4	4	5	3	0	0	2	9
12	Mahmoud Abdeen	08:45	0-2	0	0-2	0	1-2	50	0	2	2	0	2	0	0	0	1
13	Mohammad Shaher Hussein	30:31	7-11	64	0-0	0	1-3	33	12	7	19	1	3	1	0	1	15
14	Mohammad Hadrab	24:22	2-7	29	1-3	33	1-2	50	1	7	8	0	1	0	3	4	6
15	Ali Jamal Zaghab	16:00	2-6	33	0-1	0	0-0	0	0	2	2	0	4	0	0	2	4
Totals			24-58	41	5-22	23	12-21	57	14	34	48	9	19	4	4	17	65

=== Chinese Taipei vs. Qatar ===
7 August 2013
15:00

Report

Chinese Taipei	68–71	Qatar
Scoring by quarter: 15–15, 13–14, 20–20, 20–22
Pts: Davis 23; Rebs: Davis 8 Asts: Lin C.C. 4		Pts: Y. Musa 20; Rebs: Y. Musa 19; Asts: D. Musa 4

Mall of Asia Arena, Pasay
Referees: Harja Jaladri (INA), Atanu Banerjee (IND), Yuji Hirahara (JPN)

Chinese Taipei
#	Player	Min	FG		3FG		FT		REB			AST	PF	TO	STL	BS	Pts
#	Player	Min	M/A	%	M/A	%	M/A	%	OFF	DEF	TOT	AST	PF	TO	STL	BS	Pts
4	Tseng Wen-ting	25:24	1-4	25	0-2	0	1-2	50	1	2	3	3	3	3	3	0	3
5	Quincy Davis	32:26	7-11	64	0-0	0	9-11	82	1	7	8	0	1	0	0	0	23
6	Lee Hsueh-lin	24:19	2-5	40	1-2	50	0-0	0	0	3	3	2	1	2	2	0	5
7	Tien Lei	20:19	3-11	27	0-3	0	0-0	0	2	5	7	0	1	1	1	0	6
8	Chen Shih-chieh	20:25	6-7	86	1-1	100	0-2	0	0	0	0	1	1	1	1	0	13
9	Hung Chih-shan	Did not play															
10	Chou Po-Chen	00:08	0-0	0	0-0	0	0-0	0	0	0	0	0	0	0	0	0	0
11	Yang Chin-min	11:52	2-3	67	0-1	0	3-4	75	1	0	1	0	1	0	0	0	7
12	Lin Chih-chieh	19:03	0-5	0	0-5	0	0-0	0	0	1	1	4	4	0	0	0	0
13	Lu Cheng-ju	26:36	2-8	25	2-6	33	0-0	0	0	4	4	1	2	1	0	0	6
14	Tsai Wen-cheng	04:19	0-0	0	0-0	0	0-0	0	2	0	2	0	0	0	0	0	0
15	Douglas Creighton	15:03	2-5	40	1-3	33	0-0	0	1	2	3	0	1	1	1	0	5
Totals			25-59	42	5-23	22	13-19	68	8	24	32	11	15	9	9	0	68

Qatar
#	Player	Min	FG		3FG		FT		REB			AST	PF	TO	STL	BS	Pts
#	Player	Min	M/A	%	M/A	%	M/A	%	OFF	DEF	TOT	AST	PF	TO	STL	BS	Pts
4	Mansour El Hadary	12:48	1-3	33	0-0	0	0-0	0	0	1	1	1	1	0	0	5	2
5	Jarvis Hayes	36:49	6-15	40	0-5	0	1-2	50	3	4	7	2	4	0	0	3	13
6	Abdulrahman Saad	Did not play															
7	Daoud Musa	31:26	4-12	33	2-8	25	0-0	0	1	5	6	4	2	2	0	4	10
8	Khalid Suliman	20:16	0-5	0	0-1	0	4-4	100	1	0	1	2	1	0	0	1	4
9	Ali Turki Ali	21:25	2-6	33	1-4	25	2-2	100	1	3	4	1	1	0	0	1	7
10	Yasseen Musa	35:27	9-15	60	0-2	0	2-2	100	9	10	19	2	2	0	0	1	20
11	Erfan Ali Saeed	18:01	2-6	33	1-2	50	3-4	75	3	3	6	0	1	0	0	1	8
12	Mohammed Saleem Abdulla	03:28	0-1	0	0-0	0	0-0	0	0	1	1	0	1	0	0	1	0
13	Mohammed Yousef	19:20	3-9	33	1-3	33	0-0	0	1	2	3	0	1	2	1	5	7
14	Malek Saleem	Did not play															
15	Baker Ahmad Mohammed	00:55	0-0	0	0-0	0	0-0	0	0	0	0	0	0	0	0	0	0
Totals			27-72	38	5-25	20	12-14	86	19	29	48	12	14	4	1	22	71

=== Hong Kong vs. Philippines ===
7 August 2013
20:30

Report

Hong Kong	55–67	Philippines
Scoring by quarter: 19–13, 14–15, 10–18, 12–21
Pts: S. W. Chan 16; Rebs: Reid 19; Asts: K. Lee, K. W. Li 3		Pts: Douthit 13; Rebs: Norwood 10; Asts: Castro 5

Mall of Asia Arena, Pasay
Referees: Amirhossein Safarzadeh (IRI), Abdulkarim Shakeeb (BHR), Shin Gi Rok (KOR)

Hong Kong
#	Player	Min	FG		3FG		FT		REB			AST	PF	TO	STL	BS	Pts
#	Player	Min	M/A	%	M/A	%	M/A	%	OFF	DEF	TOT	AST	PF	TO	STL	BS	Pts
4	Man Chun Lam	12	2/3	67	1/2	50	1/1	100	0	1	1	0	2	0	0	0	6
5	Tsz Lai Lau	2	0/1	0	0/1	0	0/0	0	0	0	0	0	0	0	0	0	0
6	Ki Lee	18	0/4	0	0/1	0	0/0	0	1	2	3	3	1	1	0	0	0
7	Kim Wong Li	33	2/14	14	1/4	25	1/1	100	4	2	6	3	0	0	0	0	6
8	Siu Wing Chan	21	6/12	50	4/9	44	0/0	0	1	2	3	0	4	2	0	0	16
9	Tung Leung Lau	11	1/2	50	0/0	0	1/2	50	1	1	2	0	2	1	0	0	3
10	Yik Lun Chan	18	1/8	13	0/4	0	0/0	0	0	1	1	1	3	1	2	0	2
11	Chi Ho Poon	Did not play															
12	Shing Yee Fong	17	2/6	33	0/1	0	0/0	0	0	4	4	1	5	0	0	0	4
13	Chun Wai Wong	29	2/10	20	1/9	11	1/2	50	0	6	6	0	3	1	1	0	6
14	Duncan Overbeck Reid	35	5/15	33	0/1	0	2/4	50	7	12	19	2	1	4	1	0	12
15	Wai Kit Szeto	Did not play															
Totals		200	21/75	28	7/32	22	6/10	60	14	31	45	10	21	10	4	0	55

Philippines
#	Player	Min	FG		3FG		FT		REB			AST	PF	TO	STL	BS	Pts
#	Player	Min	M/A	%	M/A	%	M/A	%	OFF	DEF	TOT	AST	PF	TO	STL	BS	Pts
4	Jimmy Alapag	13	0/4	0	0/4	0	1/2	50	0	2	2	1	0	0	0	1	1
5	LA Tenorio	17	3/7	43	1/4	25	2/2	100	1	0	1	1	2	2	0	0	9
6	Jeffrei Chan	21	4/8	50	3/5	60	1/1	100	0	1	1	0	0	0	0	0	12
7	Jayson William	25	2/3	67	0/0	0	7/8	88	2	4	6	5	0	0	1	0	11
8	Gary David	12	0/2	0	0/2	0	0/0	0	1	0	1	1	2	0	0	0	0
9	Ranidel de Ocampo	11	1/6	17	0/3	0	0/0	0	0	3	3	0	2	1	0	0	2
10	Gabe Norwood	28	4/6	67	1/2	50	2/3	67	2	8	10	1	3	1	1	1	11
11	Marcus Douthit	31	6/14	43	0/0	0	1/1	100	0	8	8	1	2	3	0	2	13
12	Larry Fonacier	14	1/5	20	0/4	0	0/0	0	0	0	0	0	0	0	0	0	2
13	June Mar Fajardo	2	0	0	0	0	0	0	0	0	0	0	0	0	0	0	0
14	Japeth Aguilar	7	0/2	0	0/2	0	0	0	0	0	0	0	0	0	0	0	0
15	Marc Pingris	14	2/3	67	0/0	0	2/2	100	2	2	4	1	2	1	0	0	6
Totals		200	23/60	38	5/24	21	16/19	84.21	8	28	36	11	13	8	2	4	67
