= 2013 FIBA Asia Championship Group B =

Group B of the 2013 FIBA Asia Championship took place from 1 to 3 August 2013. This is the preliminary round of the 2013 FIBA Asia Championship, with the three teams with the best records advance to 2013 FIBA Asia Championship Group E.

The competing teams are Hong Kong, Japan and Qatar. Lebanon originally qualified for the tournament, but was replaced by 2013 Gulf Basketball Championship fourth-placer United Arab Emirates after the former was suspended indefinitely by FIBA Asia due to internal squabbles in its national basketball federation. FIBA Asia eventually decided not to issue a replacement. This caused the remaining teams to qualify automatically to the second round.

== Summary ==
Qatar and Japan fought to a close opening game, which was won by the Qataris after Jarvis Hayes split his free throws with eight seconds remaining to provide the winning margin. The two teams then easily won over Hong Kong. All three teams qualified to the second round.

== Standings ==
Qualified for the Second Round Group E
Relegated to 13th–15th Classification

Team	Pld	W	L	PF	PA	PD	Pts
Qatar	2	2	0	162	138	+24	4
Japan	2	1	1	150	134	+16	3
Hong Kong	2	0	2	123	163	−40	2

All times are local (UTC+8).

== August 1 ==
=== Japan vs. Qatar ===
1 August 2013
15:30

Report

Japan	74–75	Qatar
Scoring by quarter: 25–21, 16–14, 20–18, 13–22
Pts: Kanamaru 27; Rebs: Takeuchi 10; Asts: Sakurai 5		Pts: Hayes 20; Rebs: Y. Musa 15; Asts: Y. Musa 4

Mall of Asia Arena, Pasay
Referees: Ferdinand Pascual (PHI), Tan Chin Siong (MAS), Wang Mei (CHN)

Japan
#	Player	Min	FG		2FG		FT		REB			AST	PF	TO	STL	BS	Pts
#	Player	Min	M/A	%	M/A	%	M/A	%	OFF	DEF	TOT	AST	PF	TO	STL	BS	Pts
4	Keijuro Matsui	8	1/5	20	0/0	0	0/0	0	0	0	0	1	1	0	0	0	3
5	Daiki Tanaka	14	1/3	33.3	1/2	50	0/0	0	0	0	0	0	1	0	0	0	2
6	Makoto Hiejima	20	2/8	25	1/5	20	0/0	0	1	1	2	4	1	2	2	1	5
7	Atsuya Ota	1	0/0	0	0/0	0	0/0	0	0	0	0	1	2	0	0	0	0
8	Yuta Watanabe	Did not play															
9	Takahiro Kurihara	26	3/5	60	2/3	66.7	0/0	0	1	2	3	1	3	1	1	0	7
10	Kosuke Takeuchi	35	3/12	25	3/12	25	4/6	66.7	3	7	10	0	2	1	0	1	10
11	Ryota Sakurai	20	0/3	0	0/3	0	3/4	75	0	3	3	5	0	1	0	0	3
12	J.R. Sakuragi	30	5/12	41.7	5/11	45.5	3/3	100	1	7	8	1	5	1	0	0	13
13	Naoto Tsuji	Did not play															
14	Kosuke Kanamaru	32	10/13	76.9	6/8	75	3/3	100	0	4	4	0	4	1	0	0	27
15	Hiroshi Ichioka	14	2/3	66.7	2/3	66.7	0/1	0	2	3	5	0	2	0	1	0	4
Totals		200	27/64	42.2	20/47	42.6	13/17	76.5	9	29	38	13	21	8	4	2	74

Qatar
#	Player	Min	FG		2FG		FT		REB			AST	PF	TO	STL	BS	Pts
#	Player	Min	M/A	%	M/A	%	M/A	%	OFF	DEF	TOT	AST	PF	TO	STL	BS	Pts
4	Mansour El Hadary	23	3/4	75	3/3	100	2/2	100	0	0	0	0	2	2	0	0	8
5	Jarvis Hayes	36	6/15	40	5/13	38.5	7/8	87.5	0	6	6	1	3	2	0	0	20
6	Abdulrahman Saad	Did not play															
7	Daoud Musa	17	3/9	33.3	0/1	0	0/0	0	0	2	2	1	2	0	0	0	3
8	Khalid Suliman	25	3/9	33.3	1/5	20	1/2	50	1	1	2	0	2	1	0	0	9
9	Ali Turki Ali	17	1/2	50	0/1	0	0/0	0	0	2	2	1	2	0	0	0	3
10	Yasseen Musa	33	4/7	57.1	3/5	60	3/6	50	7	8	15	4	4	1	0	1	12
11	Erfan Ali Saeed	32	4/14	28.6	2/7	28.6	4/4	100	3	3	6	1	2	2	0	3	14
12	Mohammed Saleem Abdulla	Did not play															
13	Mohammed Yousef	13	0/6	0	0/4	0	0/0	0	0	3	3	1	2	0	0	0	0
14	Malek Saleem	1	0/0	0	0/0	0	0/0	0	0	0	0	0	1	0	0	0	0
15	Baker Ahmad Mohammed	3	0/0	0	0/0	0	0/0	0	1	1	2	0	0	1	0	0	0
Totals		200	24/66	36.4	14/39	35.9	17/22	77.3	14	31	45	11	20	11	0	4	75

== August 2 ==
=== Japan vs. Hong Kong ===
2 August 2013
15:30

Report

Japan	76–59	Hong Kong
Scoring by quarter: 25–24, 16–16, 23–13, 12–6
Pts: Tsuji 17; Rebs: Sakuragi 12; Asts: Sakurai 4		Pts: Wong 23; Rebs: Reid 10; Asts: Reid 7

Mall of Asia Arena, Pasay
Referees: Chen Ying-Cheng (TPE), Chong Yun Aun (MAS), Hatim Alharbi (KSA)

Japan
#	Player	Min	FG		2FG		FT		REB			AST	PF	TO	STL	BS	Pts
#	Player	Min	M/A	%	M/A	%	M/A	%	OFF	DEF	TOT	AST	PF	TO	STL	BS	Pts
4	Keijuro Matsui	3	03	0	0/1	0	0/0	0	0	0	0	0	0	0	0	0	0
5	Daiki Tanaka	20	1/2	50	1/1	100	4/4	100	0	1	1	1	0	0	1	0	6
6	Makoto Hiejima	23	3/6	50	3/6	50	0/0	0	0	2	2	3	3	2	1	0	6
7	Atsuya Ota	13	2/2	100	2/2	100	0/1	0	0	1	1	2	1	1	0	0	4
8	Yuta Watanabe	6	1/4	25	1/4	25	2/4	50	1	0	1	1	0	1	1	0	4
9	Takahiro Kurihara	8	1/3	33.3	1/2	50	0/0	0	0	1	1	1	1	1	1	0	2
10	Kosuke Takeuchi	21	6/9	66.7	6/9	66.7	0/0	0	3	4	7	0	1	0	0	1	12
11	Ryota Sakurai	21	1/3	33.3	1/3	33.3	0/0	0	1	2	3	4	2	0	0	0	2
12	J.R. Sakuragi	23	5/9	55.6	5/9	55.6	0/0	0	4	8	12	2	1	1	0	1	10
13	Naoto Tsuji	21	6/11	54.5	2/3	66.7	1/1	100	0	3	3	3	2	1	1	0	17
14	Kosuke Kanamaru	19	3/8	37.5	1/5	20	2/2	100	0	5	5	1	1	1	0	0	10
15	Hiroshi Ichioka	23	0/2	0	0/2	0	3/4	75	1	4	5	2	3	3	0	0	3
Totals		200	29/62	46.8	23/47	48.9	12/16	75	10	32	42	20	15	11	5	2	76

Hong Kong
#	Player	Min	FG		2FG		FT		REB			AST	PF	TO	STL	BS	Pts
#	Player	Min	M/A	%	M/A	%	M/A	%	OFF	DEF	TOT	AST	PF	TO	STL	BS	Pts
4	Man Chun Lam	9	0/4	0	0/2	0	0/0	0	1	3	4	1	1	3	0	0	0
5	Tsz Lai Lau	6	0/2	0	0/1	0	0/0	0	0	0	0	0	0	0	0	0	0
6	Ki Lee	Did not play															
7	Kim Wong Li	26	3/8	37.5	2/5	40	2/2	100	1	1	2	2	1	1	0	0	9
8	Siu Wing Chan	20	2/5	40	1/3	33.3	0/0	0	1	0	1	0	3	3	0	0	5
9	Tung Leung Lau	14	1/3	33.3	1/3	33.3	0/0	0	2	2	4	0	2	2	0	0	2
10	Yik Lun Chan	32	3/14	21.4	1/6	16.7	0/0	0	2	2	4	0	1	1	1	0	8
11	Chi Ho Poon	Did not play															
12	Shing Yee Fong	27	0/2	0	0/2	0	0/0	0	2	6	8	2	4	0	0	0	0
13	Chun Wai Wong	30	8/15	53.3	4/7	57.1	3/7	42.9	0	3	3	1	4	1	0	0	23
14	Duncan Overbeck Reid	30	5/13	38.5	5/13	38.5	0/0	0	5	5	10	7	2	3	2	0	10
15	Wai Kit Szeto	6	1/3	33.3	1/3	33.3	0/0	0	1	1	2	0	0	0	0	0	2
Totals		200	23/69	33.3	15/45	33.3	5/9	55.6	15	25	40	13	18	15	3	0	59

== August 3 ==
=== Hong Kong vs. Qatar ===
3 August 2013
20:30

Report

Hong Kong	64–87	Qatar
Scoring by quarter: 14–32, 16–12, 17–20, 17–23
Pts: Chan S.W. 18; Rebs: Fong S.Y. 10; Asts: Li K.W. 6		Pts: Hayes 25; Rebs: Saad 9 Asts: D. Musa 6

Mall of Asia Arena, Pasay
Referees: Yevgeniy Mikheyev (KAZ), Snehal Bendke (IND), Tan Chin Siong (MAS)

Hong Kong
#	Player	Min	FG		2FG		FT		REB			AST	PF	TO	STL	BS	Pts
#	Player	Min	M/A	%	M/A	%	M/A	%	OFF	DEF	TOT	AST	PF	TO	STL	BS	Pts
4	Man Chun Lam	10	1/3	33	1/2	50	0/0	0	0	1	1	0	1	1	1	0	2
5	Tsz Lai Lau	12	3/6	50	1/1	100	0/0	0	1	1	1	0	1	0	0	0	8
6	Ki Lee	12	1/6	16.7	0/2	0	0/0	0	0	1	1	0	1	1	0	0	3
7	Kim Wong Li	23	2/4	50	2/4	50	0/0	0	1	0	1	6	0	2	0	0	4
8	Siu Wing Chan	26	6/11	54.5	1/2	50	1/2	50	1	0	1	2	3	4	2	0	18
9	Tung Leung Lau	19	2/6	33.3	2/6	33.3	0/0	0	1	5	6	0	0	1	1	1	4
10	Yik Lun Chan	12	0/3	0	0/0	0	0/0	0	0	2	2	0	1	1	0	0	0
11	Chi Ho Poon	Did not play															
12	Shing Yee Fong	33	4/8	50	4/8	50	0/0	0	2	8	10	1	3	0	1	0	8
13	Chun Wai Wong	26	3/11	27.3	2/6	33.3	2/2	100	2	4	6	0	2	1	0	0	9
14	Duncan Overbeck Reid	22	4/9	44.4	4/8	50	0/2	0	1	4	5	2	3	0	0	0	8
15	Wai Kit Szeto	5	0/0	0	0/0	0	0/0	0	0	1	1	1	1	1	0	0	0
Totals		200	26/67	38.8	17/39	43.6	3/6	50	8	27	35	12	16	12	5	0	64

Qatar
#	Player	Min	FG		2FG		FT		REB			AST	PF	TO	STL	BS	Pts
#	Player	Min	M/A	%	M/A	%	M/A	%	OFF	DEF	TOT	AST	PF	TO	STL	BS	Pts
4	Mansour El Hadary	13	1/2	50	0/0	0	0/0	0	0	1	1	3	1	0	0	0	3
5	Jarvis Hayes	24	10/13	76.9	5/7	71.4	0/1	0	1	1	2	0	1	1	1	0	25
6	Abdulrahman Saad	21	1/10	10	0/2	0	1/2	50	3	6	9	3	0	2	0	0	4
7	Daoud Musa	22	6/9	66.7	2/3	66.7	1/3	33.3	3	2	5	3	0	4	0	0	17
8	Khalid Suliman	14	2/6	33.3	2/2	100	3/4	75	0	2	2	1	0	1	0	0	7
9	Ali Turki Ali	31	3/9	33.3	1/4	25	0/0	0	1	2	3	2	0	1	0	1	8
10	Yasseen Musa	9	0/2	0	0/1	0	0/0	0	0	4	4	2	1	1	0	0	0
11	Erfan Ali Saeed	13	2/2	100	1/1	100	0/0	0	1	3	4	2	1	0	0	0	5
12	Mohammed Saleem Abdulla	11	2/5	40	2/4	50	3/4	75	3	2	5	0	0	0	0	0	7
13	Mohammed Yousef	17	2/3	66.7	2/3	66.7	1/2	50	1	3	4	1	3	0	2	1	5
14	Malek Saleem	16	1/7	14.3	0/1	0	0/0	0	0	4	4	2	1	2	0	0	3
15	Baker Ahmad Mohammed	10	1/2	50	1/2	50	1/2	50	1	0	1	2	0	1	0	0	3
Totals		200	31/70	44.3	16/30	53.3	10/18	55.6	14	30	44	21	8	13	3	2	87
