= 2013 FIBA Asia Championship Group A =

Group A of the 2013 FIBA Asia Championship took place from 1 to 3 August 2013. This is the preliminary round of the 2013 FIBA Asia Championship, with the three teams with the best records (Chinese Taipei, the Philippines and Jordan) advancing to 2013 FIBA Asia Championship Group E. Saudi Arabia, the last placed team, was relegated to the 13th–15th classification round.

All games were played at the Mall of Asia Arena in Pasay, Philippines.

== Summary ==
On the first day, Chinese Taipei defeated Jordan in a close match; meanwhile, the Philippines expectedly won against Saudi Arabia, but on a closer-than-expected winning margin. The next day, the Taiwanese blew out Saudi Arabia on their second match, while the Philippines outlasted Jordan in the final minutes to win. In a game that is colored by the killing of the Philippine Coast Guard to a Taiwanese fisherman at the waters near Batanes, and the subsequent withdrawal of invitation from the 2013 William Jones Cup by Taiwanese to the Philippines, which were defending champions, Chinese Taipei banked on Lu Cheng-ju and Lin Chih-chieh to defeat the Filipinos to win the group. In a virtual elimination game, the Jordanians won by 16 points to eliminate the Saudi Arabians.

== Standings ==
Qualified for the Second Round Group E
Relegated to 13th–15th Classification

Team	Pld	W	L	PF	PA	PD	Pts
Chinese Taipei	3	3	0	265	233	+32	6
Philippines	3	2	1	234	221	+13	5
Jordan	3	1	2	221	215	+6	4
Saudi Arabia	3	0	3	180	231	−51	3

All times are local (UTC+8).

== August 1 ==
=== Jordan vs. Chinese Taipei ===
1 August 2013
13:15

Report

Jordan	87–91	Chinese Taipei
Scoring by quarter: 20–26, 21–15, 26–24, 20–26
Pts: Baxter 30; Rebs: Baxter, Alhamarsheh 6 Asts: three players 4		Pts: Lin C.C. 27; Rebs: Davis 11; Asts: Lin C.C. 5

Mall of Asia Arena, Pasay
Referees: Atanu Banerjee (IND), Toru Katayose (JPN), Arsen Andryushkin (KAZ)

Jordan
#	Player	Min	FG		2FG		FT		REB			AST	PF	TO	STL	BS	Pts
#	Player	Min	M/A	%	M/A	%	M/A	%	OFF	DEF	TOT	AST	PF	TO	STL	BS	Pts
4	Fadel Al-Najjar	13	0/0	0	0/0	0	0/2	0	0	1	1	2	4	0	0	0	0
5	Ahmad Al-Dwairi	5	0/0	0	0/0	0	0/2	0	1	0	1	0	2	1	1	1	0
6	Hani Alfaraj	1	0/0	0/0	0	0/0	0	0	0	0	0	0	0	0	0	0	0
7	Ahmad Alhamarsheh	27	2/5	40	2/4	50	1/1	100	1	5	6	4	5	0	0	0	5
8	Jimmy Baxter	36	10/20	50	5/9	55.6	5/5	100	0	6	6	4	0	3	2	0	30
9	Khaldoon Abu-Ruqayyah	21	3/10	30	1/4	25	0/1	0	0	0	0	0	1	2	0	0	8
10	Abdallah AbuQoura	1	0/0	0	0/0	0	0/0	0	0	0	0	0	0	0	0	0	0
11	Wesam Al-Sous	30	6/11	54.5	2/3	66.7	2/3	66.7	0	2	2	4	5	1	1	0	18
12	Mahmoud Abdeen	13	4/6	66.7	3/4	75	1/3	33.3	1	0	1	1	1	2	0	0	10
13	Mohammad Shaher Hussein	12	0/3	0	0/3	0	2/2	100	4	3	7	0	4	0	0	0	2
14	Mohammad Hadrab	20	3/4	75	3/4	75	2/2	100	1	3	4	0	5	1	0	1	8
15	Ali Jamal Zaghab	21	3/8	37.5	3/8	37.5	0/0	0	3	1	4	2	3	5	0	1	6
Totals		200	31/67	46.3	19/39	48.7	13/21	61.9	12	21	33	17	31	15	4	3	87

Chinese Taipei
#	Player	Min	FG		2FG		FT		REB			AST	PF	TO	STL	BS	Pts
#	Player	Min	M/A	%	M/A	%	M/A	%	OFF	DEF	TOT	AST	PF	TO	STL	BS	Pts
4	Tseng Wen-ting	15	3/6	50	3/5	60	0/2	0	1	5	6	4	2	3	0	2	6
5	Quincy Davis	28	8/9	89	8/9	89	2/2	100	5	6	11	1	2	3	0	0	18
6	Lee Hsueh-lin	21	2/3	67	2/3	67	0/0	0	0	4	4	2	2	2	0	0	4
7	Tien Lei	26	5/12	42	5/10	50	2/5	40	0	2	2	2	2	0	1	0	12
8	Chen Shih-chieh	13	4/6	67	3/5	60	1/3	33	2	1	3	1	4	0	1	1	10
9	Hung Chih-shan	5	0/0	0	0/0	0	0/0	0	0	1	1	2	0	0	0	0	0
10	Chou Po-Chen	1	0/0	0	0/0	0	0/2	0	0	1	1	0	1	0	0	0	0
11	Yang Chin-min	19	0/2	0	0/0	0	5/8	63	1	5	6	1	5	0	1	0	5
12	Lin Chih-chieh	34	7/13	54	3/5	60	9/14	64	2	4	6	5	3	4	1	0	27
13	Lu Cheng-ju	10	1/3	33	1/2	50	0/0	0	0	0	0	1	0	1	0	0	2
14	Tsai Wen-cheng	14	1/3	33	1/3	33	2/2	100	0	0	0	2	1	0	1	0	4
15	Douglas Creighton	8	1/3	33	1/1	100	0/0	0	0	1	1	0	1	0	1	0	3
Totals		194	32/60	53	27/43	63	21/38	55	11	30	41	17	20	14	6	3	91

=== Saudi Arabia vs. Philippines ===
1 August 2013
20:30

Report

Saudi Arabia	66–78	Philippines
Scoring by quarter: 16–14, 12–21, 18–22, 20–21
Pts: M. Al-Muwallad 18; Rebs: Mo. Al-Marwani 12; Asts: four players 2		Pts: Tenorio, Fonacier 12; Rebs: Douthit 11; Asts: Tenorio 6

Mall of Asia Arena, Pasay
Referees: Amirhossein Safarzadeh (IRN), Cheung Kwok Shun Andy (HKG), Thongchai Thaweewutsophon (THA)

Saudi Arabia
#	Player	Min	FG		2FG		FT		REB			AST	PF	TO	STL	BS	Pts
#	Player	Min	M/A	%	M/A	%	M/A	%	OFF	DEF	TOT	AST	PF	TO	STL	BS	Pts
4	Mohammed Al-Marwani	33	3/10	30	3/10	30	6/6	100	1	11	12	1	3	1	0	1	12
5	Marzouq Al-Muwallad	15	0/3	0	0/1	0	4/8	50	0	3	3	2	3	3	1	0	4
6	Mohammed Al-Sager	9	0/2	0	0/1	0	0/0	0	1	2	3	0	1	1	0	0	0
7	Jaber Kabe	19	1/7	14.3	1/3	33.3	0/2	0	1	1	2	1	4	1	1	0	2
8	Fahad Belal	17	0/5	0	0/0	0	2/2	100	1	2	3	2	0	1	1	0	2
9	Mustafa Al-Hwsawi	30	4/8	50	3/4	75	2/3	66.7	1	5	6	2	1	0	0	1	11
10	Mohammed Abujabal	Did not play															
11	Turki Al-Muhanna	Did not play															
12	Mathna Al-Marwani	25	2/13	15.4	0/9	0	2/4	50	2	4	6	2	2	2	0	0	8
13	Ahmed Al-Mukhtar	Did not play															
14	Ayman Al-Muwallad	35	5/11	45.5	1/2	50	4/5	80	0	0	0	1	1	1	0	0	18
15	Nassir Abo Jalas	17	2/5	40	2/4	50	5/8	62.5	1	2	3	0	2	0	0	0	9
Totals		200	17/64	26.6	10/34	29.4	25/38	65.8	13	30	38	11	17	10	3	2	66

Philippines
#	Player	Min	FG		2FG		FT		REB			AST	PF	TO	STL	BS	Pts
#	Player	Min	M/A	%	M/A	%	M/A	%	OFF	DEF	TOT	AST	PF	TO	STL	BS	Pts
4	Jimmy Alapag	14	2/4	50	1/1	100	0/0	0	0	2	2	0	1	0	0	0	5
5	LA Tenorio	21	5/10	50	3/5	60	0/0	0	0	6	6	6	3	5	0	0	12
6	Jeffrei Chan	19	2/5	40	0/0	0	0/0	0	0	1	1	1	2	0	0	0	6
7	Jayson William	10	2/5	40	2/5	40	2/3	66.7	0	3	3	1	2	0	1	0	6
8	Gary David	12	2/11	18.2	2/5	40	0/0	0	0	1	1	0	2	0	0	0	4
9	Ranidel de Ocampo	15	4/5	80	3/3	100	0/0	0	2	4	6	3	4	2	0	0	9
10	Gabe Norwood	21	1/2	50	1/1	100	0/0	0	0	2	2	0	1	0	0	1	2
11	Marcus Douthit	21	4/10	40	4/10	40	2/3	66.7	4	7	11	1	4	5	0	2	10
12	Larry Fonacier	23	4/9	44.4	2/6	33.3	2/2	100	0	1	1	4	2	0	1	0	12
13	June Mar Fajardo	9	1/3	33.3	1/3	33.3	0/0	0	1	1	2	0	4	1	0	0	2
14	Japeth Aguilar	15	1/5	20	1/4	25	0/0	0	2	3	5	0	2	0	0	2	2
15	Marc Pingris	21	4/7	57.1	4/7	57.1	0/2	0	5	4	9	1	3	1	0	1	8
Totals		200	32/76	42.1	24/50	48	6/10	60	15	35	49	17	30	14	2	6	78

== August 2 ==
=== Chinese Taipei vs. Saudi Arabia ===
2 August 2013
13:15

Report

Chinese Taipei	90–67	Saudi Arabia
Scoring by quarter: 31–14, 17–20, 17–12, 25–21
Pts: Lu C.J. 25; Rebs: Davis 10; Asts: Chen S.C. 5		Pts: A. Al-Muwallad 15; Rebs: Mo. Al-Marwani 10; Asts: 3 players 1

Mall of Asia Arena, Pasay

Chinese Taipei
#	Player	Min	FG		2FG		FT		REB			AST	PF	TO	STL	BS	Pts
#	Player	Min	M/A	%	M/A	%	M/A	%	OFF	DEF	TOT	AST	PF	TO	STL	BS	Pts
4	Tseng Wen-ting	14	0/1	0	0/1	0	0/0	0	1	5	6	0	4	1	0	0	0
5	Quincy Davis	21	6/7	85.7	6/7	85.7	2/2	100	4	6	10	1	2	1	0	2	14
6	Lee Hsueh-lin	14	0/5	0	0/2	0	0/0	0	0	2	2	4	0	0	1	0	0
7	Tien Lei	17	2/4	50	1/2	50	1/2	50	2	3	5	3	3	1	0	1	6
8	Chen Shih-chieh	16	0/4	0	0/3	0	1/2	50	0	0	0	5	0	1	0	0	1
9	Hung Chih-shan	11	1/3	33.3	0/0	0	0/0	0	2	0	1	2	1	1	1	0	3
10	Chou Po-Chen	5	2/3	66.7	2/3	66.7	0/0	0	0	1	1	0	1	0	0	0	4
11	Yang Chin-min	18	2/6	33.3	0/1	0	0/0	0	1	3	4	4	1	1	1	0	6
12	Lin Chih-chieh	14	3/4	75	2/2	100	0/0	0	0	2	2	3	2	4	0	0	7
13	Lu Cheng-ju	27	9/14	64.3	2/2	100	0/0	0	0	4	4	2	4	1	0	0	25
14	Tsai Wen-cheng	20	3/7	42.9	1/3	33.3	1/2	50	4	2	6	3	2	0	0	0	8
15	Douglas Creighton	23	5/12	41.7	1/3	33.3	2/2	100	1	2	3	3	1	0	2	0	16
Totals		200	33/70	47.1	16/32	50	7/10	70	15	31	46	30	21	11	5	3	90

Saudi Arabia
#	Player	Min	FG		2FG		FT		REB			AST	PF	TO	STL	BS	Pts
#	Player	Min	M/A	%	M/A	%	M/A	%	OFF	DEF	TOT	AST	PF	TO	STL	BS	Pts
4	Mohammed Al-Marwani	34	3/11	27.3	3/11	27.3	0/0	0	3	7	10	0	3	2	0	1	6
5	Marzouq Al-Muwallad	24	5/12	41.7	4/9	44.4	3/4	75	0	2	2	0	1	1	0	0	14
6	Mohammed Al-Sager	10	2/4	50	2/3	66.7	2/2	100	0	1	1	1	0	0	0	0	6
7	Jaber Kabe	19	5/8	62.5	5/7	71.4	0/0	0	1	1	2	0	4	2	1	0	10
8	Fahad Belal	20	0/5	0	0/2	0	1/2	50	0	3	3	0	2	0	0	0	1
9	Mustafa Al-Hwsawi	23	0/5	0	0/2	0	1/2	50	6	3	9	0	1	1	0	0	1
10	Mohammed Abujabal	4	1/2	50	1/2	50	2/2	100	0	0	0	0	0	0	0	0	4
11	Turki Al-Muhanna	Did not play															
12	Mathna Al-Marwani	16	0/1	0	0/1	0	4/6	66.7	0	2	2	0	1	4	0	0	4
13	Ahmed Al-Mukhtar	3	0/0	0	0/0	0	0/0	0	2	0	2	1	0	1	0	0	0
14	Ayman Al-Muwallad	27	6/14	42.9	6/12	50	3/3	100	1	2	3	0	0	1	0	0	15
15	Nassir Abo Jalas	20	2/8	25	1/6	16.7	1/1	100	1	3	4	1	2	1	0	0	6
Totals		200	24/70	34.3	22/50	40	17/22	77.3	18	25	43	3	14	13	1	1	67

=== Jordan vs. Philippines ===
2 August 2013
20:30

Report

Jordan	71–77	Philippines
Scoring by quarter: 20–16, 18–17, 9–24, 24–20
Pts: Hadrab 19; Rebs: Hussein 9 Asts: Abdeen 4		Pts: Chan 17; Rebs: Douthit 9 Asts: Tenorio, Norwood 4

Mall of Asia Arena, Pasay
Referees: Mohammad Alamiri (KUW), Yuji Hirahara (JPN), Wang Mei (CHN)

Jordan
#	Player	Min	FG		2FG		FT		REB			AST	PF	TO	STL	BS	Pts
#	Player	Min	M/A	%	M/A	%	M/A	%	OFF	DEF	TOT	AST	PF	TO	STL	BS	Pts
4	Fadel Al-Najjar	05	0/0	0	0/0	0	0/0	0	1	1	1	0	1	0	0	0	0
5	Ahmad Al-Dwairi	0	0/0	0	0/0	0	0/0	0	0	0	0	0	0	0	0	0	0
6	Hani Alfaraj	08	0/5	0	0/5	0	0/0	0	1	1	2	2	0	0	3	0	0
7	Ahmad Alhamarsheh	31	1/7	14	0/4	0	0/2	0	3	5	8	1	3	5	0	0	3
8	Jimmy Baxter	38	6/13	46	5/9	56	1/3	33	1	5	6	2	1	3	0	0	14
9	Khaldoon Abu-Ruqayyah	13	1/3	33	0/0	0	0/0	0	1	1	2	1	1	1	0	0	3
10	Abdallah AbuQoura	08	1/1	100	1/1	100	0/2	0	1	0	1	0	1	1	0	0	2
11	Wesam Al-Sous	30	3/9	33	0/1	0	4/4	100	2	1	3	1	2	1	1	2	13
12	Mahmoud Abdeen	16	2/3	67	1/2	50	1/2	50	0	0	0	4	2	3	0	0	6
13	Mohammad Shaher Hussein	16	3/5	60	3/5	60	3/4	75	3	6	9	0	4	1	0	2	9
14	Mohammad Hadrab	20	6/11	55	5/9	55	5/5	100	2	1	3	0	2	0	0	0	19
15	Ali Jamal Zaghab	14	1/4	25	1/4	25	0/0	0	0	5	5	0	2	0	0	0	2
Totals		200	24/61	39	15/36	42	14/24	58	14	26	40	12	18	17	4	2	71

Philippines
#	Player	Min	FG		2FG		FT		REB			AST	PF	TO	STL	BS	Pts
#	Player	Min	M/A	%	M/A	%	M/A	%	OFF	DEF	TOT	AST	PF	TO	STL	BS	Pts
4	Jimmy Alapag	06	1/2	50	0/0	0	0/0	0	0	0	0	1	2	1	0	0	3
5	LA Tenorio	14	1/6	17	0/1	0	0/0	0	2	1	3	4	2	1	0	0	3
6	Jeffrei Chan	26	6/10	60	1/3	33	0/0	0	2	0	2	2	1	0	0	0	17
7	Jayson William	22	6/18	33	5/12	42	3/4	75	1	3	4	3	1	1	1	1	16
8	Gary David	07	0/2	0	0/2	0	2/2	100	0	0	0	1	1	1	0	0	2
9	Ranidel de Ocampo	26	4/11	36	1/5	20	0/0	0	2	2	4	0	5	2	0	0	11
10	Gabe Norwood	37	2/5	40	1/3	33	3/5	60	4	4	8	4	0	2	2	2	8
11	Marcus Douthit	32	4/7	57	4/7	57	3/6	50	1	8	9	1	3	3	1	3	11
12	Larry Fonacier	09	0/2	0	0/1	0	0/0	0	0	1	1	0	1	0	0	0	0
13	June Mar Fajardo	02	0/0	0	0/0	0	0/0	0	0	0	0	0	1	1	0	0	0
14	Japeth Aguilar	08	2/3	67	2/3	67	2/2	100	0	2	2	0	1	1	0	0	6
15	Marc Pingris	10	0/1	0	0/1	0	0/0	0	2	1	3	0	2	0	0	0	0
Totals		200	26/67	39	14/40	35	13/19	68	14	22	36	16	20	13	4	6	77

== August 3 ==
=== Philippines vs. Chinese Taipei ===
3 August 2013
20:30

Report

Philippines	79–84	Chinese Taipei
Scoring by quarter: 19–30, 24–12, 25–13, 11–29
Pts: Fonacier 21; Rebs: Douthit 10; Asts: William, Alapag 4		Pts: Lu C.J. 22; Rebs: Davis 10; Asts: Lin C.C. 12

Mall of Asia Arena, Pasay
Referees: Harja Jaladri (INA), Arsen Andryushkin (KAZ), Chong Yun Aun (MAS)

Philippines
#	Player	Min	FG		2FG		FT		REB			AST	PF	TO	STL	BS	Pts
#	Player	Min	M/A	%	M/A	%	M/A	%	OFF	DEF	TOT	AST	PF	TO	STL	BS	Pts
4	Jimmy Alapag	17	3/9	33.3	2/3	66.7	2/2	100	0	1	1	4	2	1	1	0	9
5	LA Tenorio	2	0/0	0	0/0	0	0/0	0	0	0	0	0	0	0	0	0	0
6	Jeffrei Chan	15	0/2	0	0/0	0	0/0	0	0	0	0	0	2	0	0	0	0
7	Jayson William	29	4/15	26.7	4/12	33.3	3/4	75	3	5	8	4	3	2	1	0	11
8	Gary David	6	0/5	0	0/4	0	0/0	0	0	1	1	0	1	0	0	0	0
9	Ranidel de Ocampo	19	5/13	38.5	2/7	28.6	0/0	0	3	1	4	0	2	0	1	0	13
10	Gabe Norwood	35	3/6	50	2/3	66.7	2/6	33.3	1	3	4	3	3	1	0	1	9
11	Marcus Douthit	30	5/9	55.6	5/9	55.6	6/8	75	5	5	10	0	2	1	1	2	16
12	Larry Fonacier	29	8/13	61.5	3/6	50	0/0	0	3	1	4	0	1	1	1	0	21
13	June Mar Fajardo	Did not play															
14	Japeth Aguilar	10	0/1	0	0/1	0	0/0	0	0	3	3	1	3	0	0	1	0
15	Marc Pingris	8	0/1	0	0/1	0	0/0	0	1	2	3	1	3	0	0	1	0
Totals		200	28/74	37.8	18/46	39.1	13/20	65	16	23	39	12	21	8	5	5	79

Chinese Taipei
#	Player	Min	FG		2FG		FT		REB			AST	PF	TO	STL	BS	Pts
#	Player	Min	M/A	%	M/A	%	M/A	%	OFF	DEF	TOT	AST	PF	TO	STL	BS	Pts
4	Tseng Wen-ting	27	5/6	83.3	3/3	100	4/4	100	0	1	1	5	4	3	0	2	16
5	Quincy Davis	23	3/3	100	3/3	100	0/0	0	0	10	10	1	3	3	0	1	6
6	Lee Hsueh-lin	29	0/1	0	0/0	0	0/0	0	0	5	5	2	1	2	0	0	0
7	Tien Lei	23	7/12	58.3	3/4	75	0/0	0	0	3	3	1	2	2	0	0	18
8	Chen Shih-chieh	8	0/2	0	0/1	0	0/0	0	1	0	1	0	0	1	0	0	0
9	Hung Chih-shan	2	0/0	0	0/0	0	0/0	0	0	0	0	1	1	0	0	0	0
10	Chou Po-Chen	Did not play															
11	Yang Chin-min	6	1/2	50	1/1	100	0/0	0	0	1	1	0	0	0	0	0	2
12	Lin Chih-chieh	35	6/14	42.9	3/8	37.5	5/8	62.5	1	8	9	12	1	3	1	0	20
13	Lu Cheng-ju	35	8/14	57.1	2/5	40	0/2	0	2	3	5	0	3	2	0	0	22
14	Tsai Wen-cheng	3	0/1	0	0/1	0	0/0	0	0	0	0	0	0	0	0	0	0
15	Douglas Creighton	7	0/1	0	0/0	0	0/0	0	0	0	0	1	1	0	0	0	0
Totals		200	30/56	53.6	15/26	64.3	9/14	64.3	5	32	37	23	16	17	1	3	84

=== Saudi Arabia vs. Jordan ===
3 August 2013
22:30

Report

Saudi Arabia	47–63	Jordan
Scoring by quarter: 12–18, 16–8, 11–20, 8–17
Pts: A. Al-Muwallad 16; Rebs: Mo. Al-Marwani 12; Asts: M. Al-Muwallad 5		Pts: Baxter 15; Rebs: Zaghab 10; Asts: Baxter 3

Mall of Asia Arena, Pasay
Referees: Atanu Banerjee (IND), Peng Ling (CHN), Amirhossein Safarzadeh (IRN)

Saudi Arabia
#	Player	Min	FG		2FG		FT		REB			AST	PF	TO	STL	BS	Pts
#	Player	Min	M/A	%	M/A	%	M/A	%	OFF	DEF	TOT	AST	PF	TO	STL	BS	Pts
4	Mohammed Al-Marwani	39	6/11	54.55	6/10	60	2/4	50	6	6	12	1	5	4	1	0	14
5	Marzouq Al-Muwallad	34	1/6	16.67	1/4	25	3/5	60	1	3	4	5	3	5	2	0	5
6	Mohammed Al-Sager	Did not play															
7	Jaber Kabe	33	2/10	20	0/0	0	2/6	33.33	1	3	4	1	2	3	1	0	6
8	Fahad Belal	Did not play															
9	Mustafa Al-Hwsawi	37	2/5	40	1/3	33.33	0/0	0	2	5	7	0	1	1	0	0	5
10	Mohammed Abujabal	Did not play															
11	Turki Al-Muhanna	Did not play															
12	Mathna Al-Marwani	18	0/7	0	0/3	0	1/2	50	1	5	6	0	3	2	0	0	1
13	Ahmed Al-Mukhtar	Did not play															
14	Ayman Al-Muwallad	33	4/18	22.22	4/10	40	8/13	61.54	0	2	2	0	2	0	0	0	16
15	Nassir Abo Jalas	2	0/0	0	0/0	0	0/0	0	0	0	0	0	1	0	0	0	0
Totals		200	15/57	26.32	14/40	35	16/30	53.33	11	24	35	7	17	15	4	0	47

Jordan
#	Player	Min	FG		2FG		FT		REB			AST	PF	TO	STL	BS	Pts
#	Player	Min	M/A	%	M/A	%	M/A	%	OFF	DEF	TOT	AST	PF	TO	STL	BS	Pts
4	Fadel Al-Najjar	21	0/2	0	0/0	0	0/0	0	0	4	4	2	3	1	3	0	0
5	Ahmad Al-Dwairi	2	0/0	0	0/0	0	2/4	50	0	1	1	0	0	0	0	0	2
6	Hani Alfaraj	9	0/2	0	0/1	0	0/0	0	2	0	2	1	3	0	1	0	0
7	Ahmad Alhamarsheh	30	3/7	42.86	3/6	50	0/0	0	3	5	8	2	1	3	0	1	6
8	Jimmy Baxter	29	6/14	42.86	6/11	54.55	3/3	100	2	3	5	3	4	0	0	0	15
9	Khaldoon Abu-Ruqayyah	12	2/2	100	1/1	100	0/0	0	1	2	3	0	2	2	0	0	5
10	Abdallah AbuQoura	13	1/3	33.33	1/3	33.33	1/3	33.33	0	4	4	2	1	0	0	0	3
11	Wesam Al-Sous	21	4/8	50	1/2	50	0/0	0	0	1	1	1	4	3	0	0	11
12	Mahmoud Abdeen	13	1/6	16.67	1/3	33.33	0/0	0	0	2	2	1	1	1	1	0	2
13	Mohammad Shaher Hussein	4	0/2	0	0/2	0	0/0	0	0	1	1	0	0	0	0	1	0
14	Mohammad Hadrab	22	3/7	42.86	2/3	66.66	2/2	100	2	2	4	0	3	3	0	0	9
15	Ali Jamal Zaghab	20	5/9	55.56	0/0	0	0/0	0	3	7	10	1	1	0	0	1	10
Totals		200	25/62	40.32	20/41	48.78	8/12	66.67	13	32	45	13	23	13	5	3	63
