= 2025–26 Georgia State Panthers men's basketball team =

American college basketball season

2025–26 Georgia State Panthers men's basketball
- Conference: Sun Belt Conference
- Record: 10–22 (7–11 Sun Belt)
- Head coach: Jonas Hayes (4th season)
- Assistant coaches: Jeff Dunlap (1st season); Jarvis Hayes (7th season); Allen Payne (4th season); Stevie Taylor (1st season)
- Home arena: GSU Convocation Center

2025–26 Sun Belt Conference men's basketball standings
	Conf.				Overall
Team	W		L	PCT	W		L	PCT
Troy	12	–	6	.667	20	–	11	.645
Marshall	11	–	7	.611	19	–	12	.613
Coastal Carolina	11	–	7	.611	19	–	12	.613
Appalachian State	11	–	7	.611	19	–	12	.613
Texas State	11	–	7	.611	19	–	12	.613
South Alabama	11	–	7	.611	21	–	10	.677
Arkansas State	11	–	7	.611	20	–	11	.645
Southern Miss	9	–	9	.500	16	–	15	.516
James Madison	9	–	9	.500	17	–	14	.548
Georgia Southern	8	–	10	.444	16	–	15	.516
Old Dominion	7	–	11	.389	11	–	20	.355
Louisiana	7	–	11	.389	10	–	21	.323
Georgia State	7	–	11	.389	10	–	21	.323
Louisiana–Monroe	1	–	17	.056	4	–	27	.129
† 2026 Sun Belt tournament winner As of February 27, 2026

The 2025–26 Georgia State Panthers men's basketball team represented Georgia State University during the 2025–26 NCAA Division I men's basketball season. The Panthers, led by third-year head coach Jonas Hayes, played their home games at the GSU Convocation Center in Atlanta, Georgia as members of the Sun Belt Conference.

== Previous season ==
The Panthers finished the 2024–25 season 14–19, 8–10 in Sun Belt play to finish in a four-way tie for eighth place. They would defeat Georgia Southern in the third round of the Sun Belt tournament before losing to Marshall in the fourth round.

== Offseason ==
=== Departures ===
Departures
Name	Number	Pos.	Height	Weight	Year	Hometown	Reason for departure
Jason Jackson	0	G	6'4"	185	Freshman	Sarasota, Florida	Transferred to Howard
Malik Ferguson	1	G	6'4"	190	Sophomore	Grovetown, Georgia	Transferred to Tennessee Tech
Justin Archer	2	F	6'7"	210	Graduate student	North Brunswick, New Jersey	Transferred to La Salle
Cesare Edwards	4	C	6'10"	235	Senior	Hartsville, South Carolina	Graduated; signed as a UDFA for the Oklahoma City Thunder
Brevyn Coleman	6	G	6'2"	185	Sophomore	Lakewood, Ohio	Transferred to Seward County CC
Zarique Nutter	7	F	6'7"	210	Senior	Newark, New Jersey	Transferred to Fordham
Darnell Evans	8	G	6'0"	165	Senior	Amityville, New York	Transferred to Clark Atlanta
Toneari Lane	11	G	6'5"	205	Senior	Atlanta, Georgia	Transferred to San Diego
Dhiaukuei "DK" Manyiel Dut	12	F	7'0"	210	RS Freshman	Rumbek, South Sudan	Transferred to California
Aaron Oh	14	G	6'0"	185	RS Sophomore	Buford, Georgia	
Nick McMullen	33	F	6'8"	235	Senior	Greensboro, North Carolina	Exhausted eligibility

=== Incoming transfers ===
Incoming transfers
Name	Number	Pos.	Height	Weight	Year	Hometown	Previous school
Jakai Newton	1	G	6'4"	205	RS Sophomore	Covington, Georgia	Indiana
James Cooper	2	F	6'8"	235	Graduate student	Mauldin, South Carolina	Oregon
Anthony Enoh	12	F	6'7"	225	Junior	Uyo, Nigeria	Jessup
Ayouba Berthe	20	G	6'5"	200	Senior	Minneapolis, Minnesota	Minot State

=== Recruiting class ===
College recruiting information
Name	Hometown	School	Height	Weight	Commit date
Christian Beam; C	Woodland, Alabama	Southern Union State Community College	7 ft 1 in (2.16 m)	255 lb (116 kg)	
Christian Beam; C	Recruit ratings: Rivals: 247Sports: ESPN: (N/A)				
Joah Chappelle; F	Atlanta, Georgia	Pearl River Community College	6 ft 8 in (2.03 m)	200 lb (91 kg)	
Joah Chappelle; F	Recruit ratings: Rivals: 247Sports: ESPN: (N/A)				
Chris Jones; G	Atlanta, Georgia	Douglass High School	6 ft 6 in (1.98 m)	205 lb (93 kg)	
Chris Jones; G	Recruit ratings: Rivals: 247Sports: ESPN: (N/A)				
Isaiah Sherrard; F	Westlake Village, California	Moorpark College	6 ft 7 in (2.01 m)	185 lb (84 kg)	
Isaiah Sherrard; F	Recruit ratings: Rivals: 247Sports: ESPN: (N/A)				
Micah Tucker; G	Atlanta, Georgia	Overtime Elite	6 ft 3 in (1.91 m)	190 lb (86 kg)	
Micah Tucker; G	Recruit ratings: Rivals: 247Sports: ESPN: (N/A)				
Overall recruit ranking:
Note: In many cases, Scout, Rivals, 247Sports, On3, and ESPN may conflict in their listings of height and weight.; In these cases, the average was taken. ESPN grades are on a 100-point scale.; Sources: "2025 Team Ranking". Rivals.

== Preseason ==
=== Preseason Sun Belt Conference poll ===
The Panthers were picked to finish in eleventh place in the conference's preseason poll. Redshirt sophomore guard Jelani Hamilton was named to the conference preseason second team.

Coaches poll
Predicted finish	Team (1st place Votes)
1	James Madison - 175 (1)
2	Arkansas State - 154 (3)
3	South Alabama - 152 (4)
4	Troy - 148 (1)
5	Old Dominion - 145 (2)
6	Marshall - 128 (1)
7	App State - 123 (1)
8	Texas State - 106
9	Louisiana - 95 (1)
10	Georgia Southern - 66
11	Georgia State - 59
12	Southern Miss - 57
13	Coastal Carolina - 43
14	ULM - 19

== Roster ==
2025–26 Georgia State Panthers men's basketball team
Players
Coaches

Pos.	#	Name	Height	Weight	Year	Previous school	Hometown
G	0	Micah Tucker	6 ft 3 in (1.91 m)	190 lb (86 kg)	Fr	Overtime Elite	Atlanta, Georgia
G	1	Jakai Newton	6 ft 4 in (1.93 m)	205 lb (93 kg)	RS So	Indiana	Covington, Georgia
F	2	James Cooper	6 ft 8 in (2.03 m)	235 lb (107 kg)	GS	Oregon	Mauldin, South Carolina
F	4	Trey Scott III	6 ft 11 in (2.11 m)	225 lb (102 kg)	RS Fr	Mount Vernon Presbyterian School	Atlanta, Georgia
F	6	Joah Chappelle	6 ft 8 in (2.03 m)	200 lb (91 kg)	So	Pearl River CC	Atlanta, Georgia
G	7	Emmanuel Koveos	6 ft 0 in (1.83 m)	160 lb (73 kg)	Jr	DME Academy	Rhodes, Greece
F	8	Isaiah Sherrard	6 ft 7 in (2.01 m)	185 lb (84 kg)	Jr	Moorpark College	Westlake Village, California
F	9	Kwame Tanic	6 ft 7 in (2.01 m)	200 lb (91 kg)	So	Lycée Français d'Irlande	Paris, France
G	10	Jelani Hamilton	6 ft 5 in (1.96 m)	200 lb (91 kg)	RS So	Iowa State	Marietta, Georgia
F	12	Anthony Enoh	6 ft 7 in (2.01 m)	225 lb (102 kg)	Jr	Jessup	Uyo, Nigeria
G	20	Ayouba Berthe	6 ft 5 in (1.96 m)	200 lb (91 kg)	Sr	Minot State	Minneapolis, Minnesota
F	21	Clash Peters	6 ft 9 in (2.06 m)	240 lb (109 kg)	So	Word of God Christian Academy	Long Beach, California
G	22	Malachi Brown	6 ft 1 in (1.85 m)	175 lb (79 kg)	Jr	Seton Hall	Buford, Georgia
C	32	Christian Beam	7 ft 1 in (2.16 m)	255 lb (116 kg)	So	Southern Union State CC	Woodland, Alabama
G	55	Chris Jones	6 ft 6 in (1.98 m)	205 lb (93 kg)	Fr	Douglass High School	Atlanta, Georgia

Head coach

- Jonas Hayes (Georgia)

Assistant coach(es)

- Jeff Dunlap (UCLA)
- Jarvis Hayes (Georgia)
- Allen Payne (Auburn)
- Stevie Taylor (Ohio)

Legend

- (C) Team captain
- (S) Suspended
- (I) Ineligible
- (W) Walk-on
- Injured
- Current redshirt

Roster
Last update: October 16, 2025

== Schedule and results ==
Date time, TV	Rank^{#}	Opponent^{#}	Result	Record	High points	High rebounds	High assists	Site (attendance) city, state
Exhibition
October 15, 2025*; 7:00 pm		Georgia; CareSource Invitational	L 61–65	–	–	–	–	GSU Convocation Center; Atlanta, GA
October 24, 2025*; 7:00 pm		at Morehouse	W 73–62	–	–	–	–	Forbes Arena (1,867); Atlanta, GA
Non-conference regular season
November 3, 2025*; 6:30 pm, ESPN+		at Eastern Michigan; MAC–SBC Challenge	L 49–71	0–1	13 – Hamilton	8 – Enoh	3 – Brown	George Gervin GameAbove Center (1,729); Ypsilanti, MI
November 7, 2025*; 7:00 pm, ESPN+		at Cincinnati	L 64–74	0–2	26 – Hamilton	9 – Chappelle	4 – Hamilton	Fifth Third Arena (10,009); Cincinnati, OH
November 10, 2025*; 7:00 pm, ESPN+		Presbyterian	L 61–63	0–3	23 – Chappelle	6 – Tied	4 – Tucker	GSU Convocation Center (1,262); Atlanta, GA
November 13, 2025*; 7:00 pm, ESPN+		Fort Valley State	W 90–56	1–3	18 – Tucker	12 – Chappelle	3 – Tied	GSU Convocation Center (1,832); Atlanta, GA
November 17, 2025*; 9:00 pm, ESPN+		at Arizona State	L 62–75	1–4	15 – Brown	9 – Newton	4 – Brown	Desert Financial Arena (5,925); Tempe, AZ
November 21, 2025*; 8:00 pm, SLN		at South Dakota State; Cancún Challenge	L 58–105	1–5	21 – Hamilton	4 – Beam	4 – Tucker	First Bank & Trust Arena (2,641); Brookings, SD
November 25, 2025*; 3:00 pm, FloSports		vs. Samford; Cancún Challenge	L 63–78	1–6	21 – Tucker	7 – Tied	3 – Brown	Hard Rock Hotel Riviera Maya; Cancun, Mexico
November 26, 2025*; 3:00 pm, FloSports		vs. New Mexico State; Cancún Challenge	L 58–77	1–7	15 – Tucker	11 – Chappelle	5 – Brown	Hard Rock Hotel Riviera Maya; Cancun, Mexico
December 2, 2025*; 7:00 pm, ESPN+		at Mercer	L 67–78	1–8	18 – Newton	9 – Chappelle	3 – Brown	Hawkins Arena (955); Macon, GA
December 6, 2025*; 3:00 pm, ESPN+		at Kennesaw State	L 69–92	1–9	15 – Brown	8 – Enoh	2 – Tied	Convocation Center (3,064); Kennesaw, GA
December 13, 2025*; 2:00 pm, ESPN+		Jacksonville State	W 77–73	2–9	23 – Hamilton	12 – Enoh	3 – Tied	GSU Convocation Center (1,698); Atlanta, GA
December 18, 2025; 8:00 pm, ESPN+		at Georgia Southern; Modern Day Hate	L 67–90	2–10 (0–1)	19 – Hamilton	6 – Hamilton	5 – Tied	Hill Convocation Center (1,850); Statesboro, GA
December 20, 2025; 1:00 pm, ESPN+		at Appalachian State	W 70–63	3–10 (1–1)	24 – Hamilton	9 – Enoh	5 – Tucker	Holmes Center (1,711); Boone, NC
December 28, 2025*; 5:00 pm, ESPN+		Columbia College (SC)	W 110–72	4–10	24 – Tucker	8 – Scott III	5 – Brown	GSU Convocation Center (1,562); Atlanta, GA
December 31, 2025; 4:00 pm, ESPN+		at Marshall	L 80–84	4–11 (1–2)	15 – Tied	7 – Chappelle	3 – Brown	Cam Henderson Center (3,684); Huntington, WV
January 3, 2026; 1:00 pm, ESPN+		at Coastal Carolina	W 89–71	5–11 (2–2)	23 – Brown	6 – Enoh	7 – Tucker	HTC Center (2,026); Conway, SC
January 8, 2026; 7:00 pm, ESPN+		Appalachian State	L 50–52	5–12 (2–3)	17 – Hamilton	9 – Beam	3 – Tucker	GSU Convocation Center (1,649); Atlanta, GA
January 10, 2026; 4:00 pm, ESPN+		Marshall	W 81–73	6–12 (3–3)	23 – Hamilton	8 – Beam	3 – Brown	GSU Convocation Center (1,892); Atlanta, GA
January 17, 2026; 3:30 pm, ESPN+		at Louisiana–Monroe	W 77–57	7–12 (4–3)	20 – Tied	9 – Hamilton	8 – Hamilton	Fant–Ewing Coliseum (1,402); Monroe, LA
January 22, 2026; 7:00 pm, ESPN+		Southern Miss	W 69–62	8–12 (5–3)	23 – Hamilton	10 – Brown	4 – Tucker	GSU Convocation Center (1,478); Atlanta, GA
January 24, 2026; 2:00 pm, ESPN+		Arkansas State	W 82–81	9–12 (6–3)	38 – Hamilton	4 – Chappelle	5 – Tied	GSU Convocation Center (2,078); Atlanta, GA
January 29, 2026; 8:00 pm, ESPN+		at Louisiana	L 72–82	9–13 (6–4)	25 – Brown	8 – Chappelle	3 – Tucker	Cajundome (2,436); Lafayette, LA
January 31, 2026; 8:00 pm, ESPN+		at South Alabama	L 67–69	9–14 (6–5)	21 – Brown	9 – Brown	6 – Hamilton	Mitchell Center (2,125); Mobile, AL
February 4, 2026; 7:00 pm, ESPN+		Troy	L 63–74	9–15 (6–6)	18 – Tucker	9 – Enoh	5 – Enoh	GSU Convocation Center (2,037); Atlanta, GA
February 7, 2026*; 2:00 pm, ESPN+		Northern Illinois; MAC–SBC Challenge	L 74–75	9–16	16 – Tied	13 – Beam	5 – Tucker	GSU Convocation Center (1,589); Atlanta, GA
February 12, 2026; 7:00 pm, ESPN+		at James Madison	L 79–81 ^{OT}	9–17 (6–7)	28 – Hamilton	7 – Hamilton	5 – Tucker	Atlantic Union Bank Center (2,947); Harrisonburg, VA
February 14, 2026; 3:30 pm, ESPN+		at Old Dominion	L 55–78	9–18 (6–8)	25 – Brown	6 – Beam	3 – Hamilton	Chartway Arena (4,759); Norfolk, VA
February 19, 2026; 8:00 pm, ESPN+		Georgia Southern; Modern Day Hate	W 66–64	10–18 (7–8)	19 – Brown	10 – Hamilton	3 – Tucker	GSU Convocation Center (3,479); Atlanta, GA
February 21, 2026; 4:00 pm, ESPN+		James Madison	L 65–80	10–19 (7–9)	22 – Tucker	6 – Hamilton	3 – Brown	GSU Convocation Center (1,396); Atlanta, GA
February 24, 2026; 7:30 pm, ESPN+		Coastal Carolina	L 71–76	10–20 (7–10)	26 – Brown	8 – Tied	6 – Brown	GSU Convocation Center (2,267); Atlanta, GA
February 27, 2026; 7:00 pm, ESPN+		Old Dominion	L 73–81	10–21 (7–11)	20 – Hamilton	11 – Chappelle	3 – Tied	GSU Convocation Center (2,752); Atlanta, GA
Sun Belt tournament
March 3, 2026*; 6:00 pm, ESPN+	(13)	vs. (12) Louisiana; First round	L 75–84	10–22	20 – Hamilton	6 – Tied	4 – Tied	Pensacola Bay Center; Pensacola, FL
*Non-conference game. ^{#}Rankings from AP Poll. (#) Tournament seedings in parentheses. All times are in Eastern.
