= Jonas Hayes =

American college basketball coach (born 1981)

Current position
- Title: Assistant coach
- Team: Georgia
- Conference: SEC

Biographical details
- Born: August 9, 1981 (age 45); Atlanta, Georgia, U.S.

Playing career
- 1999–2000: Western Carolina
- 2001–2004: Georgia
- Position: Forward

Coaching career (HC unless noted)
- 2005–2006: Morehouse (assistant)
- 2006–2007: South Carolina State (assistant)
- 2007–2012: Belmont Abbey (assistant)
- 2013–2018: Georgia (assistant)
- 2018–2021: Xavier (assistant)
- 2021–2022: Xavier (associate HC)
- 2022: Xavier (interim HC)
- 2022–2026: Georgia State
- 2026–present: Georgia (assistant)

Head coaching record
- Overall: 52–78 (.400)
- Tournaments: 4–0 (NIT)

Accomplishments and honors

Championships
- NIT (2022)

Jonas Hayes (born August 9, 1981) is an American college basketball coach and former player. He is an assistant coach for the Georgia Bulldogs. Hayes previously served as the head coach of the Georgia State Panthers from 2022 to 2026 and as an assistant coach and interim head coach for the Xavier Musketeers. He also has held assistant coaching positions at Morehouse, South Carolina State, and Belmont Abbey. As a player, Hayes played college basketball for the Western Carolina Catamounts and Georgia Bulldogs.

== College career ==
Hayes and his twin brother, Jarvis, initially enrolled at Western Carolina University in 1999 to play for the Western Carolina Catamounts. In his freshman season, Hayes averaged 8.0 points, 4.9 rebounds, 0.2 assists, 0.7 steals, and 0.5 blocks per game on an average of 18.4 minutes. He shot 63.0% from field goal range and 51.2% from the free throw line. His field goal percentage was the highest in the Southern Conference and the 12th-highest at the NCAA Division I level. Hayes played in 24 games and started one game at Western Carolina. The brothers initially remained there for one season before transferring to the University of Georgia in 2000.

Hayes had to sit out his sophomore season due to a former transfer rule. In his junior season, Hayes averaged 7.2 points, 5.0 rebounds, 0.5 assists, 0.6 steals, and 0.3 blocks per game on an average of 20.9 minutes. He shot 55.5% from field goal range and 71.4% from the free throw line. That year, he helped the Bulldogs to the NCAA Division I Tournament and had 14 points and 14 rebounds in the team's first-round win over Murray State. In his senior season, Hayes averaged 6.7 points, 4.4 rebounds, 0.7 assists, 0.4 steals, and 0.3 blocks per game on average of 21.1 minutes. He shot 52.8% from field goal range and 61.4% from the free throw line. In his fifth-year season, Hayes averaged 11.9 points, 5.3 rebounds, 1.0 assists, 0.8 steals, and 0.1 blocks per game on an average of 28.4 minutes. He shot 51.2% from field goal range and 65.7% from the free throw line. He graduated from the University of Georgia in 2004 with a bachelor's degree in child and family development.

== Coaching career ==
Following the end of his collegiate playing career, Hayes spent one season as an assistant coach at Frederick Douglass High School (Atl). One year later, he was hired by Morehouse College to be an assistant coach for the men's basketball team in 2005. He remained with the team for one season before being hired as an assistant for the South Carolina State Bulldogs. In 2007, Belmont Abbey College hired Hayes as an assistant, a post he remained at until 2012.

In 2012, Hayes returned to his alma mater as an operations coordinator for the men's basketball team. In 2013, he was promoted to the role of assistant coach. In his first three seasons as an assistant on Mark Fox's staff, the Bulldogs won 20 or more games, making an NCAA Tournament and two NIT Tournament appearances. Hayes is credited with aiding the development of forwards like Marcus Thornton and Yante Maten. He remained with Georgia until Fox's firing in 2018.

In 2018, Hayes was hired as an assistant coach for the Xavier Musketeers. In 2021, he was promoted to the role of associate head coach. Following the firing of Travis Steele at the end of the 2021–22 regular season, Hayes was named the team's interim head coach. He led the Musketeers to the school's second-ever NIT championship.

=== Georgia State ===
On April 6, 2022, Hayes was announced as the head coach of Georgia State.

== Head coaching record ==
Record table
| Season | Team | Overall | Conference | Standing | Postseason |
|---|---|---|---|---|---|
Xavier Musketeers (Big East Conference) (2022)
| 2021–22 | Xavier | 4–0 | | | NIT Champions |
| Xavier: | | 4–0 (1.000) | | | |
Georgia State Panthers (Sun Belt Conference) (2022–2026)
| 2022–23 | Georgia State | 10–21 | 3–15 | 14th | |
| 2023–24 | Georgia State | 14–17 | 8–10 | T–7th | |
| 2024–25 | Georgia State | 14–19 | 8–10 | T–8th | |
| 2025–26 | Georgia State | 10–22 | 7–11 | T–11th | |
| Georgia State: | | 48–78 (.381) | 27–46 (.370) | | |
| Total: | | 52–78 (.400) | | | |
National champion Postseason invitational champion Conference regular season champion Conference regular season and conference tournament champion Division regular season champion Division regular season and conference tournament champion Conference tournament champion

== Personal life ==
Hayes's twin brother, Jarvis, was born five minutes ahead of him and is a former National Basketball Association player and current assistant coach for his brother at GSU.
