= Mohammad Hadrab =

Jordanian basketball player

Zain Group
- Position: Forward
- League: Jordan Basketball League

Personal information
- Born: November 6, 1984 (age 42) Kuwait city
- Listed height: 6 ft 7 in (2.01 m)

Mohammad Hadrab
Medal record

Men's basketball

Representing Jordan

FIBA Asia Championship
Bronze medal – third place	2009 Tianjin	Team

Mohammad Hadrab (born November 6, 1984, in Jordan) is a Jordanian professional basketball player. He plays for Zaid of the Jordanian basketball league. He also is a member of the Jordan national basketball team.

== Career ==
Hamdan debuted for the Jordanian team at the FIBA Asia Championship 2009. He helped the squad to a national best third-place finish by averaging 5.3 points and 3.4 rebounds per game off the bench.
