= Daiki Tanaka =

Japanese basketball player

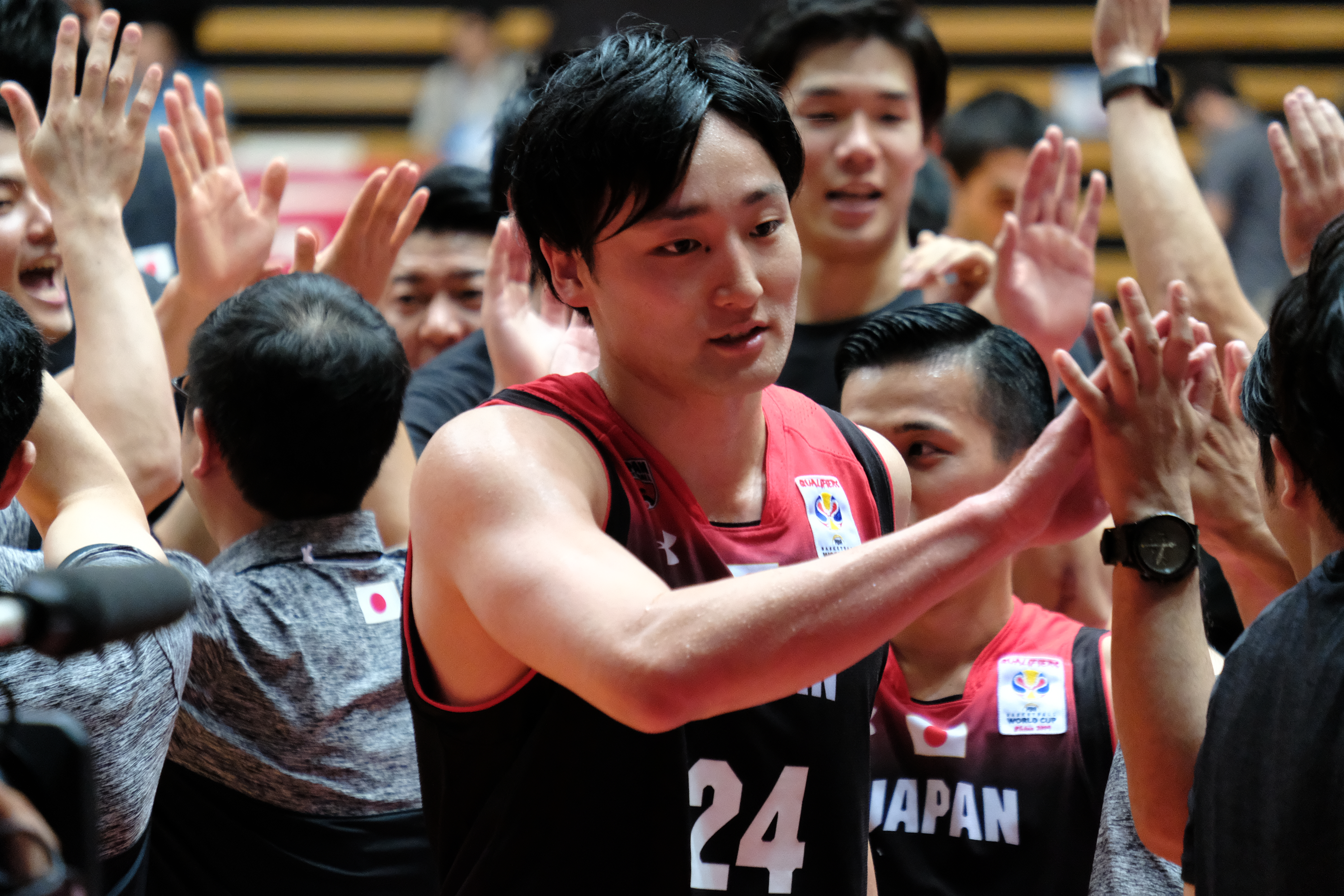

No. 13 – Sun Rockers Shibuya
- Position: Shooting guard
- League: B.League

Personal information
- Born: September 3, 1991 (age 35) Unzen, Nagasaki, Japan
- Listed height: 6 ft 4 in (1.93 m)
- Listed weight: 205 lb (93 kg)

Career information
- High school: Nagasaki Nishi
- College: Tokai University
- Playing career: 2014–present

Career history
- 2014–2023: Alvark Tokyo
- 2023–present: Sun Rockers Shibuya

Career highlights
- FIBA Asia Champions Cup champion (2019); 2× B.League champion (2018, 2019)
Medals
Men's basketball
Representing Japan
FIBA Asia Challenge
Silver medal – second place	2012 Japan	Team competition
Asian Games
Bronze medal – third place	2014 South Korea	Team competition
EABA Championship
Bronze medal – third place	2017 Nagano	Team
FIBA Asia Champions Cup
Silver medal – second place	2018 Thailand	Team
Gold medal – first place	2019 Thailand	Team

Daiki Tanaka (田中 大貴, Tanaka Daiki; born September 3, 1991) is a Japanese professional basketball player. He currently plays for the Sun Rockers Shibuya of the B.League in Japan.

He represented Japan's national basketball team at the 2017 FIBA Asia Cup, where he was Japan’s best passer and 3 point shooter.

== Career statistics ==
Legend
GP	Games played	GS	Games started	MPG	Minutes per game
FG%	Field goal percentage	3P%	3-point field goal percentage	FT%	Free throw percentage
RPG	Rebounds per game	APG	Assists per game	SPG	Steals per game
BPG	Blocks per game	PPG	Points per game	**Bold**	Career high

Year	Team	GP	GS	MPG	FG%	3P%	FT%	RPG	APG	SPG	BPG	PPG
2013-14	Toyota	19	0	11.5	.547	.300	.800	1.5	1.2	0.3	0.1	4.3
2014-15	Toyota	54		27.6	.481	.407	.843	2.2	2.4	1.3	0.2	11.6
2015-16	Toyota	47		25.6	.440	.349	.835	1.9	2.5	1.0	0.1	11.5
2016-17	A Tokyo	**62**	**59**	29.7	.447	.410	.769	**3.1**	2.6	**1.5**	.1	**13.4**
2017-18	A Tokyo	58	56	**29.3**	.442	.360	.787	2.0	**5.1**	1.2	.1	12.5
2018-19	A Tokyo	49	47	27.4	.457	.301	.781	2.2	4.5	1.1	.1	10.1
