= Kosuke Kanamaru =

Japanese basketball player

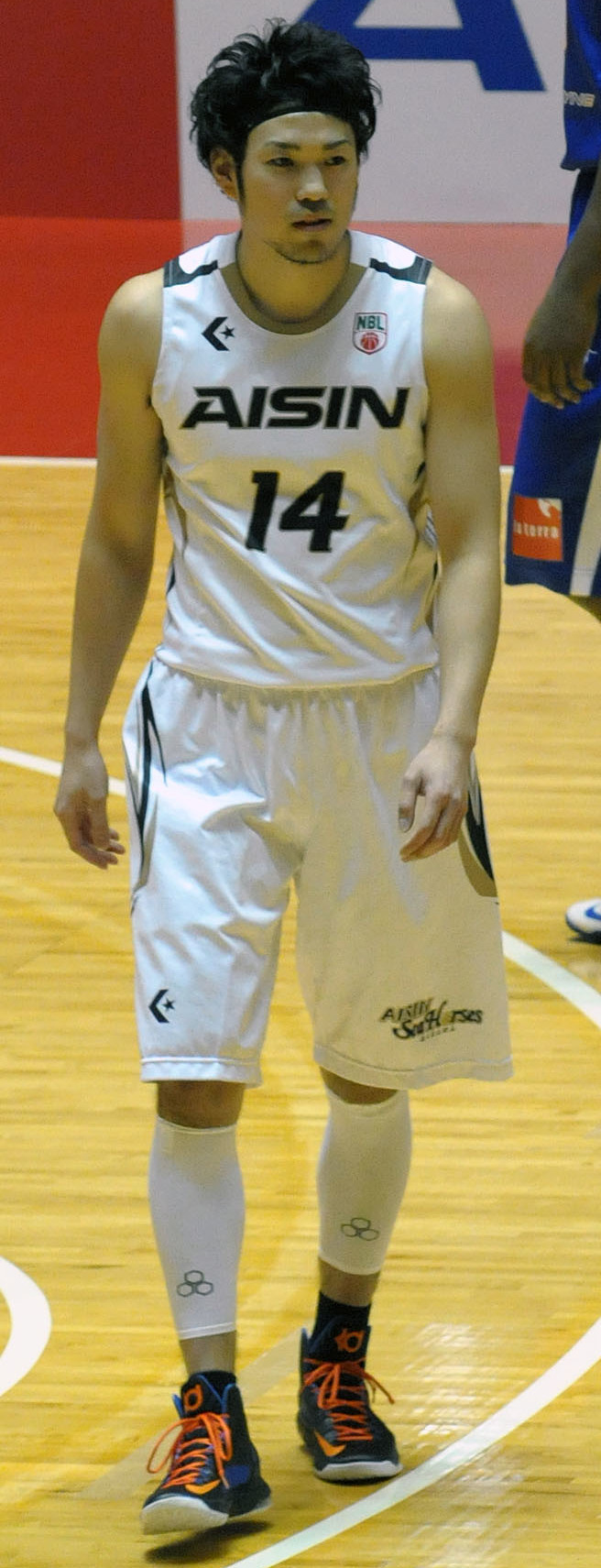
- Kanamaru in 2014

No. 14 – Saga Ballooners
- Position: Forward
- League: B.League

Personal information
- Born: March 8, 1989 (age 37) Nakagawa, Fukuoka
- Listed height: 6 ft 4 in (1.93 m)
- Listed weight: 194 lb (88 kg)

Career information
- High school: Fukuoka University Ohori (Fukuoka, Fukuoka)
- College: Meiji University
- Playing career: 2011–present

Career history
- 2011–2013: Panasonic Trians
- 2013-2021: Aisin SeaHorses Mikawa
- 2021-2022: Shimane Susanoo Magic
- 2022-2024: San-en NeoPhoenix
- 2024-present: Saga Ballooners

Career highlights
- JBL Rookie of the Year; JBL Free Throw Pct leader; JBL Best Five; 2x NBL 3point pct Leader; NBL Best Five; B.League Free Throw pct leader; B.League 3point pct leader; 2x B.League Best Five
Medals
Men's basketball
Representing Japan
FIBA Asia Cup
Silver medal – second place	2012 Tokyo	Japan
Asian Games
Bronze medal – third place	2014 Incheon	Japan

Kosuke Kanamaru (金丸晃輔, Kanamaru Kōsuke; born March 8, 1989) is a Japanese professional basketball player for the Saga Ballooners of the B.League.

== Career statistics ==
Legend
GP	Games played	GS	Games started	MPG	Minutes per game
FG%	Field goal percentage	3P%	3-point field goal percentage	FT%	Free throw percentage
RPG	Rebounds per game	APG	Assists per game	SPG	Steals per game
BPG	Blocks per game	PPG	Points per game	**Bold**	Career high

†	Denotes seasons in which Kanamaru won a championship
*	Led the league

Year	Team	GP	GS	MPG	FG%	3P%	FT%	RPG	APG	SPG	BPG	PPG
2011-12	Panasonic	41	41	33.7	.422	.383	.852	3.4	0.7	0.5	0.3	15.7
2012-13	Panasonic	30	29	32.8	.456	.461	.911*	2.4	0.9	0.5	0.4	15.6
2013-14	Aisin	52	50	31.9	.465	.473*	.868	2.3	0.9	0.5	0.2	15.4
2014-15†	Aisin	45	45	34.9	.485	.453*	.920*	2.7	1.0	0.8	0.0	19.7
2015-16	Aisin	51	50	33.0	.422	.365	.850	2.4	1.1	0.5	0.1	17.5
2016-17	Mikawa	54	52	29.4	.450	.426*	.908*	2.0	0.7	0.5	0.1	16.7
2017-18	Mikawa	57	50	28.1	.445	.395	.932*	1.9	1.1	0.6	0.1	15.7

== Personal life ==
He is a bass fishing enthusiast.
