= Atsuya Ota =

Japanese basketball player

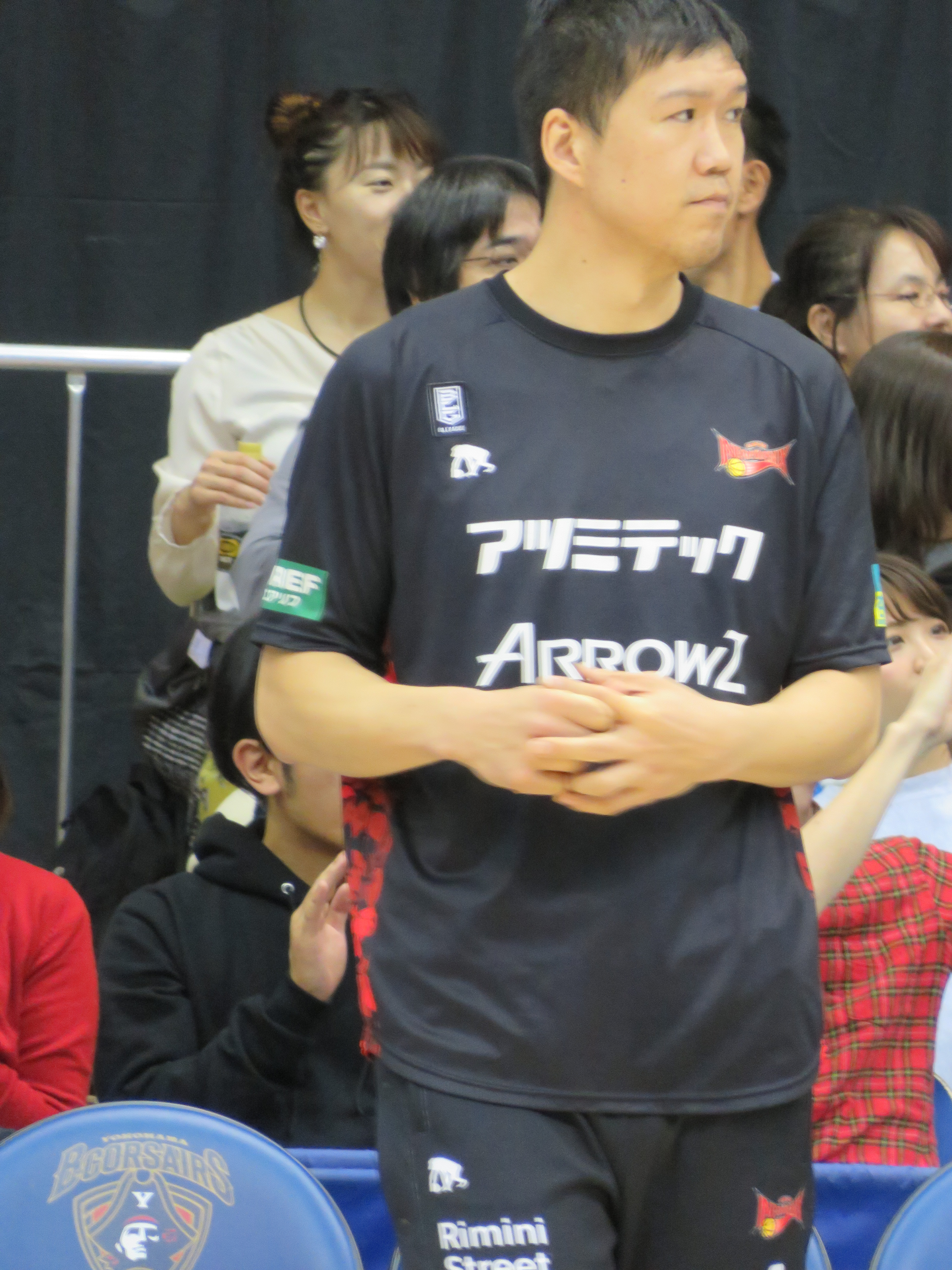

San-en NeoPhoenix
- Position: Center
- League: B.League

Personal information
- Born: April 6, 1984 (age 42) Toyokawa, Aichi, Japan
- Listed height: 6 ft 9 in (2.06 m)
- Listed weight: 247 lb (112 kg)

Career information
- High school: Kashiwa
- College: Nihon University
- Playing career: 2007–present

Career history
- 2007–present: San-en NeoPhoenix

Career highlights
- Bj League Best Five (2011-12); 3x bj League Champions
Medals
Men's basketball
Representing Japan
Asian Games
| Bronze medal – third place | 2014 South Korea | Team competition |

Atsuya Ota (太田 敦也, Ōta Atsuya; born April 6, 1984) is a Japanese professional basketball player. He currently plays for the San-en NeoPhoenix club of the B.League in Japan.

He represented Japan's national basketball team at the 2016 FIBA Asia Challenge.

He did judo at the elementary school. There was no judo club in his junior high school and switched to basketball. He received entrance offers from 73 high schools and chose the Kashiwa High School in Chiba Prefecture, following the Nakamura's advice.

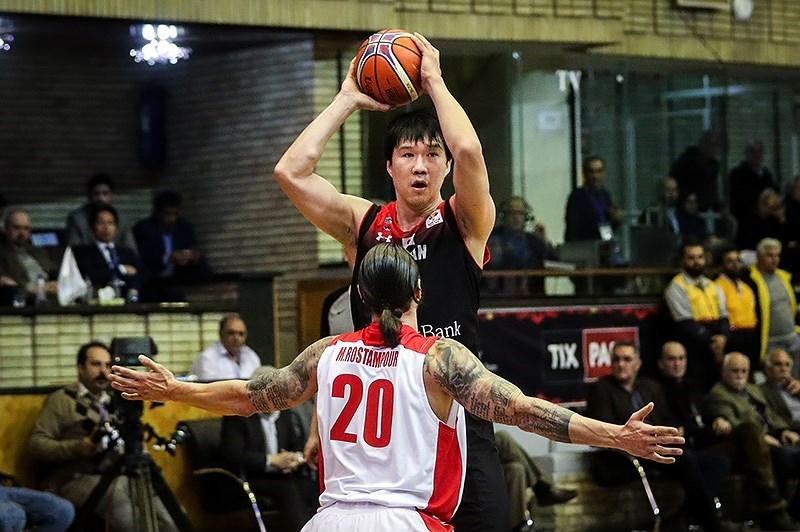
Ota with national team
