= Fadel Al-Najjar =

Jordanian basketball player

Ahli (Jordan)
- Position: Point guard
- League: Jordan Basketball League

Personal information
- Born: 2 April 1985 (age 41) Kuwait City
- Listed height: 6 ft 6 in (1.98 m)
- Listed weight: 200 lb (91 kg)

Career information
- College: ASU

Fadel Al-Najjar
Medal record

Men's basketball

Representing Jordan

FIBA Asia Championship
| Bronze medal – third place | 2009 Tianjin | Team |

Fadel Al-Najjar (Arabic: فضل النجار) (born 2 April 1985 in Kuwait City) is a Jordanian professional basketball player who currently plays for Al Ahli (Jordan) of the Jordanian Premier Basketball League "JPL". He plays in both the point guard and shooting guard positions.

Al-Najjar competed with the Jordanian team at the FIBA Asia Championship 2007 and FIBA Asia Championship 2009. Al-Sous averaged 1.9 points per game off the bench for the Jordanian squad in 2009, helping them to a third-place finish that was a national high.
