= Ali Jamal Zaghab =

Jordanian basketball player

Al-Jubaiha
- Position: Center / power forward
- League: Jordan Basketball League

Personal information
- Born: June 3, 1988 (age 38) Aqaba, Jordan
- Listed height: 6 ft 8 in (2.03 m)
- Listed weight: 275 lb (125 kg)

Career information
- NBA draft: 2010: undrafted
- Playing career: 2006–2021

Career history
- 2006–2017: Al Riyadi Amman
- 2017–2020: Al-Awdah
- 2020–2021: Al-Jubaiha

Ali Jamal Zaghab (born June 3, 1988) is a Jordanian professional basketball player. He plays for Al Riyadi Amman of the Jordanian basketball league. He also is a member of the Jordan national basketball team.

== Career ==
Zaghab debuted for the Jordanian team at the 2010 FIBA World Championship, playing center off the bench for the squad.
