= Naoto Tsuji =

Japanese basketball player

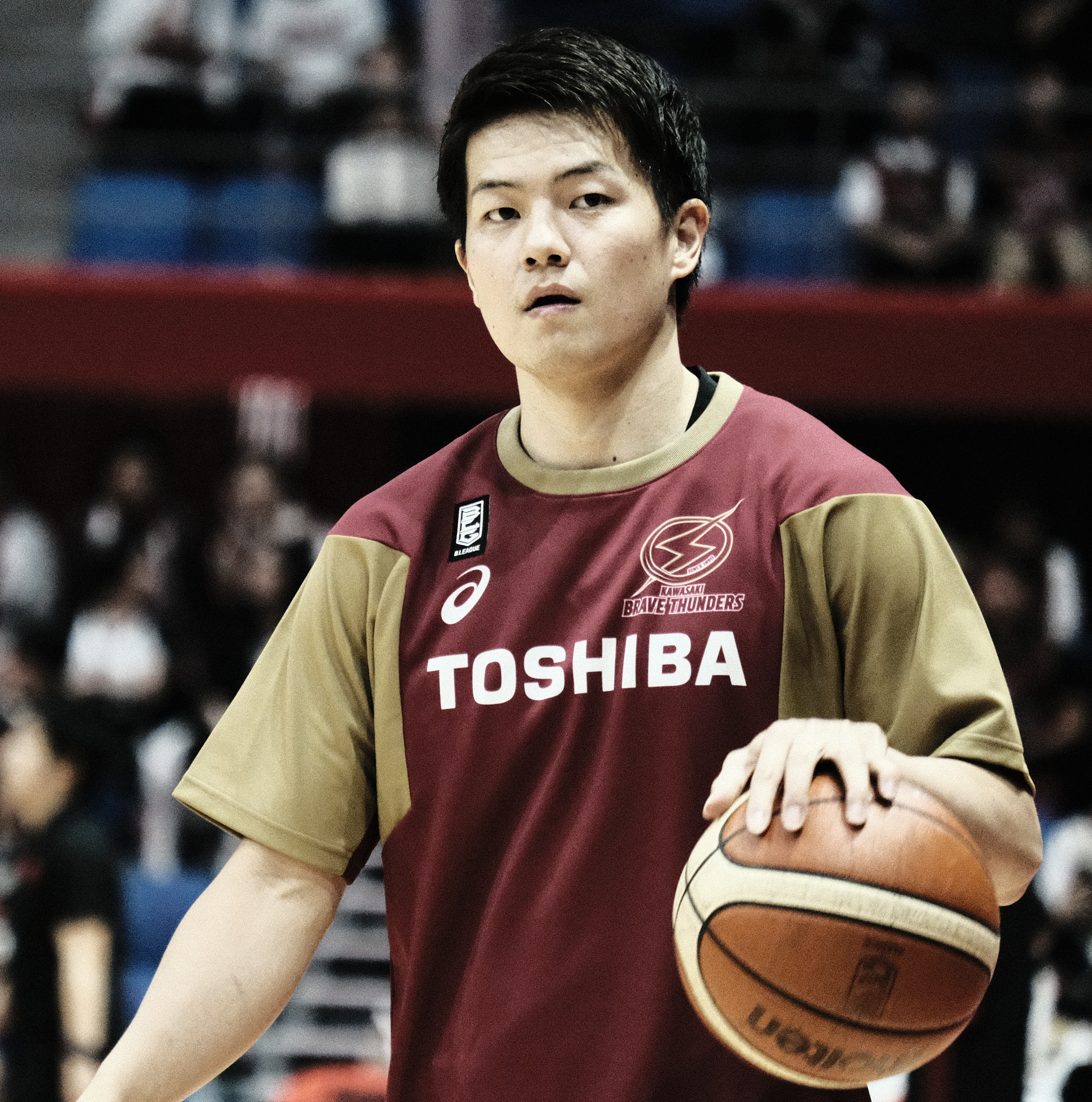

No. 9 – Gunma Crane Thunders
- Position: Point guard
- League: B.League

Personal information
- Born: September 8, 1989 (age 37) Habikino, Osaka, Japan
- Listed height: 6 ft 1 in (1.85 m)
- Listed weight: 185 lb (84 kg)

Career information
- High school: Rakunan
- College: Aoyama Gakuin University
- Playing career: 2012–present

Career history
- 2012–2021: Toshiba Brave Thunders Kanagawa
- 2021-2023: Hiroshima Dragonflies
- 2023-: Gunma Crane Thunders

Career highlights
- B1 League champion (2024); JBL Rookie of the Year (2013); NBL Playoff MVP (2014); 2x Japanese College Champions; 2x Japanese High School Champions

Medal record

Men's basketball

Representing Japan

Asian Games
Bronze medal – third place	2014 South Korea	Team competition

Naoto Tsuji (辻 直人, Tsuji Naoto; born September 8, 1989 in Habikino, Osaka, Japan) is a Japanese professional basketball player. As of 2018 he plays for the Kawasaki Brave Thunders of the B.League.

He has been a member of Japan's national basketball team on many occasions. At the 2016 FIBA World Olympic Qualifying Tournament – Belgrade, he was Japan's top scorer.

== Flagrant foul ==
He was disqualified from the B.League game at Toyama City Gymnasium for punching Grouses' Satoru Maeta on December 25, 2019.

== Career statistics ==
Legend
GP	Games played	GS	Games started	MPG	Minutes per game
FG%	Field goal percentage	3P%	3-point field goal percentage	FT%	Free throw percentage
RPG	Rebounds per game	APG	Assists per game	SPG	Steals per game
BPG	Blocks per game	PPG	Points per game	**Bold**	Career high

=== Regular season ===
Year	Team	GP	GS	MPG	FG%	3P%	FT%	RPG	APG	SPG	BPG	PPG
2012-13	Toshiba	42		27.9	.401	.366	.800	2.1	2.9	0.7	0.1	11.7
2013-14	Toshiba	54	54	25.8	.454	.460	.788	2.0	2.9	1.0	0.1	12.8
2014-15	Toshiba	54		28.2	.435	.399	.881	1.9	2.3	1.2	0.1	14.1
2015-16	Toshiba	52		28.7	.428	.415	.863	2.1	2.9	0.7	0.1	12.2
2016-17	Kawasaki											
