= Jarvis Hayes =

American-Qatari basketball player and coach (born 1981)

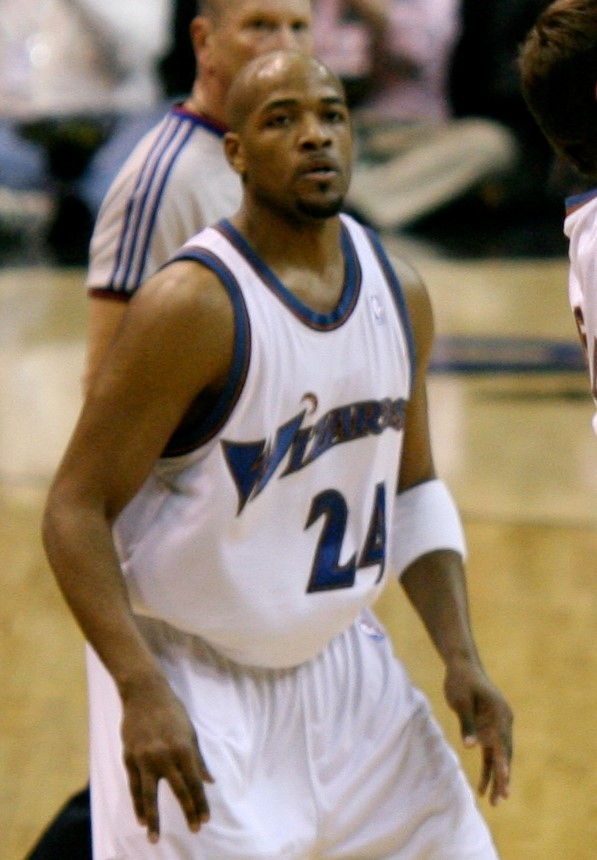
- Hayes in 2007

Georgia Bulldogs
- Title: Assistant coach
- League: SEC

Personal information
- Born: August 9, 1981 (age 45) Atlanta, Georgia, U.S.
- Listed height: 6 ft 8 in (2.03 m)
- Listed weight: 220 lb (100 kg)

Career information
- High school: Frederick Douglass (Atlanta, Georgia)
- College: Western Carolina (1999–2000); Georgia (2001–2003)
- NBA draft: 2003: 1st round, 10th overall pick
- Drafted by: Washington Wizards
- Playing career: 2003–2015
- Position: Small forward / shooting guard
- Number: 24, 9, 22
- Coaching career: 2018–present

Career history

Playing
- 2003–2007: Washington Wizards
- 2007–2008: Detroit Pistons
- 2008–2010: New Jersey Nets
- 2011: Aliağa Petkim
- 2011–2012: Krasnye Krylia
- 2013: Ironi Ashkelon
- 2013–2014: Sidigas Avellino
- 2014–2015: Asesoft Ploiești

Career highlights
- NBA All-Rookie Second Team (2004); Romanian League champion (2015); Russian Cup winner (2012); SEC Rookie of the Year – Coaches (2002); 2× First-team All-SEC (2002, 2003)
- Stats at NBA.com
- Stats at Basketball Reference

Jarvis James Hayes (born August 9, 1981) is an American-Qatari former professional basketball player and current coach. He is an assistant coach for the Georgia Bulldogs. Hayes was selected by the Washington Wizards with the 10th overall pick of the 2003 NBA draft.

== Early life and college career ==
Hayes was born five minutes ahead of his twin brother, Jonas. After attending Douglass High School in Atlanta, he, alongside his brother, enrolled at Western Carolina, where he became the first freshman in 40 seasons to lead the Southern Conference in scoring.

After a year, he transferred to Georgia, where he was named First Team All-SEC in both his sophomore and junior years. He became the first Bulldog to be so honored since Dominique Wilkins in 1981–82. He also stepped up in big games, averaging 28.5 points per game during the two games Georgia played in the 2002 NCAA tournament.

Hayes holds the rare distinction of having led two different conferences in scoring while in college.

== Professional career ==
=== NBA career ===
He was taken 10th in the 2003 NBA draft by the Washington Wizards, to back up Jerry Stackhouse, to come in off the bench and provide that deep range. Hayes averaged 13.0 points and 4.3 rebounds through the first three games of the season but hit the 'rookie wall' within a month. He was the Wizards' only representative at the season's All-Star Weekend in Los Angeles when he made the Rookie-Sophomore challenge. By season's end, he had made through a tough season and sported some solid numbers in spite of missing 12 games with various injuries. In that rookie season, he averaged 9.6 points while making 42 starts and playing an average of 29.2 minutes.

Hayes did well in his second season, filling in for Larry Hughes, averaging 10.2 points a game, until a night in February when he and Manu Ginobili bumped knees. A few games later, Hayes went up for a dunk against the Sacramento Kings and when he came down, his right knee had split completely open. For a year, he hoped things would get better without surgery. In his recovery period from the injury, he ballooned to 245 pounds reviewing local area restaurants with Washingtonian Magazine Food Critic Tom Head on a weekly radio segment.

In his third season, at a preseason game at Wake Forest, Hayes scored 18 points in the first half of a preseason matchup with the San Antonio Spurs on Tobacco Road. After that game, his right knee, which forced him to miss a third of the 2004–05 season after he fractured his kneecap, swelled through the night. Hayes missed the remainder of the preseason. Later, on December 16, 2005, he had to leave a Laker game. The knee had fractured again and again his season was over. On February 14, 2006, he had the long-delayed surgery with the pins.

In the 2006–07 season, he played 81 games, but only averaged 7.2 points, shot only 41% overall, but better than 36% from the three and 84.5% from the line. In the Wizards' injury plagued first round loss to the Cavs, he had started all four games, averaging 10.5 and 3.5 but shot only 32.6%. Even with a 29-point effort in the double triple-double overtime loss to the Nets in April 2007, he clearly was not the same player. Although he still had the ability to make his off-balance jump shots, he seemed to shy away from contact. From filling the lanes on the fast break as a healthy rookie he often settled for shots on the perimeter.

The Wizards declined to offer Hayes a contract after the 2006–07 season. On August 15, 2007, after four years with the Wizards, Hayes signed a contract for the veteran's minimum with the Detroit Pistons. Hayes became a player in the Pistons rotation, serving as the main backup for starter Tayshaun Prince. He averaged 6.7 points in 15.7 minutes, improved on his shooting numbers, and had another 29-point effort again as his best game.

Hayes signed with the New Jersey Nets on July 16, 2008. He became the team's 6th man, he also learned to play the power forward position during the season.

Hayes' final NBA game was played on April 9, 2010, in a 127 - 116 win over the Chicago Bulls where he played for 9 minutes and recorded 2 points and 1 steal.

=== European career ===
In January 2011, Hayes joined the Turkish club Aliağa Petkim. In July 2011, he signed a one-year deal with BC Krasnye Krylya Samara in Russia.

In February 2013, he joined the Israeli club Ironi Ashkelon.

On September 16, 2013, he signed a one-year deal with the Italian club Sidigas Avellino.

== Coaching career ==
Following his retirement from basketball, Hayes served as a TV analyst for the SEC Network and NBA TV. In 2018, he was hired as an assistant coach at Morehouse. After one season at Morehouse, he was hired as an assistant at Georgia State, a position he served for seven seasons from 2019 to 2026.

On April 8, 2026, Hayes was named an assistant coach at Georgia, joining the coaching staff of Bulldogs head coach Mike White.

== Qatari national team ==
Hayes became a naturalized citizen of Qatar in 2013 and played for the senior men's Qatari national basketball team until his retirement from basketball in 2015. He led the Qatar national team with 25 points, in an 87–64 win over Hong Kong, during group play of the 2013 FIBA Asia Championship in Manila, Philippines.

== Personal life ==
Hayes and his wife, Illia, were married in 2008. The couple has two sons: Jarvis Jr. and Myles.

== NBA career statistics ==
Legend
GP	Games played	GS	Games started	MPG	Minutes per game
FG%	Field goal percentage	3P%	3-point field goal percentage	FT%	Free throw percentage
RPG	Rebounds per game	APG	Assists per game	SPG	Steals per game
BPG	Blocks per game	PPG	Points per game	**Bold**	Career high
*	Led the league

=== Regular season ===
Year	Team	GP	GS	MPG	FG%	3P%	FT%	RPG	APG	SPG	BPG	PPG
2003–04	Washington	70	**42**	**29.2**	.400	.305	.786	3.8	1.5	**1.0**	**.2**	9.6
2004–05	Washington	54	22	28.9	.389	.341	.839	**4.2**	**1.7**	.9	**.2**	**10.2**
2005–06	Washington	21	13	24.6	.421	.362	.833	3.6	1.3	.8	.0	9.3
2006–07	Washington	81	17	20.1	.410	.361	**.845**	2.6	1.0	.6	**.2**	7.2
2007–08	Detroit	**82***	1	15.7	.431	.376	.750	2.2	.8	.6	.1	6.7
2008–09	New Jersey	74	1	24.8	**.445**	**.385**	.692	3.6	.7	.7	.1	8.7
2009–10	New Jersey	45	9	23.0	.421	.335	.778	2.4	.9	.6	**.2**	7.8
Career		427	115	23.2	.415	.356	.798	3.1	1.1	.7	.1	8.3

=== Playoffs ===
Year	Team	GP	GS	MPG	FG%	3P%	FT%	RPG	APG	SPG	BPG	PPG
2007	Washington	4	**4**	**34.8**	**.326**	**.368**	**.857**	**3.5**	**1.0**	**.5**	**.3**	**10.8**
2008	Detroit	**11**	0	5.5	.300	.357	.000	1.5	.4	.1	.2	2.1
Career		15	4	13.3	.316	.364	.857	2.0	.5	.2	.2	4.4
