= Khalid Suliman =

Qatari basketball player (born 1987)

Khalid Suliman Abdi
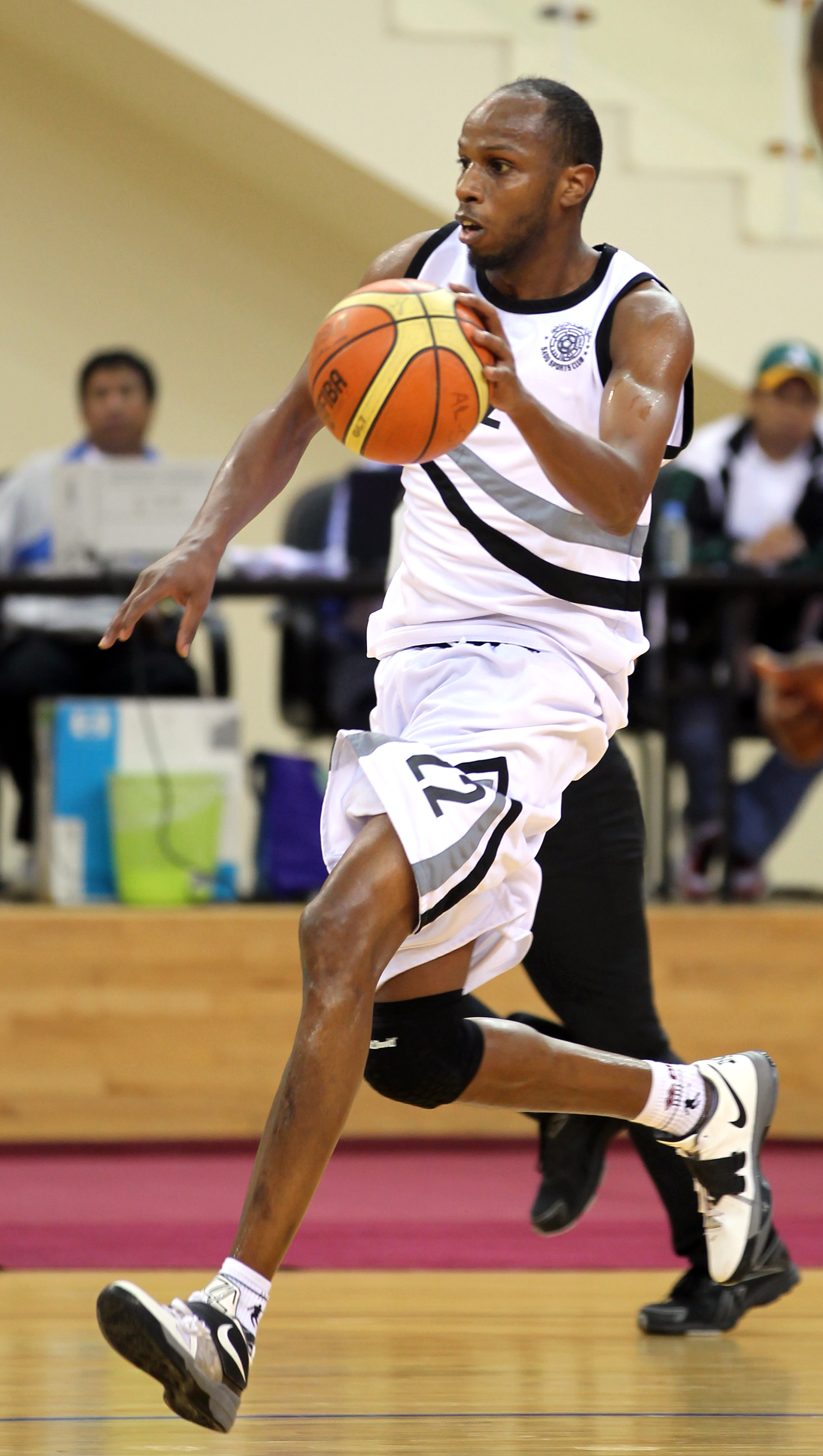
- Khalid Suliman Abdi in 2012

Al Ahli
- Position: Guard-Forward
- League: Qatar Basketball League

Personal information
- Born: February 7, 1987 (age 39) Doha, Qatar
- Listed height: 6 ft 6 in (1.98 m)

Career history
- 2005–2008: Al-Sadd
- 2008–2009: Al-Arabi
- 2009–2017: Al-Sadd
- 2017–2021: Al-Arabi
- 2021–present: Al-Ahli

Khalid Suliman Abdi (born February 7, 1987) is a professional basketball player. He plays for Al Ahli of the Qatar basketball league. He is also a member of the Qatar national basketball team.

Suliman competed for the Qatar national basketball team at the 2007 and FIBA Asia Championship 2009. He also competed for Qatar at their only FIBA World Championship performance to date, in 2006, where he averaged 3.8 points and 1.6 rebounds per game.
