= 2013 FIBA Asia Championship classification rounds =

The classification rounds of the 2013 FIBA Asia Championship are games of the 2013 FIBA Asia Championship in the Philippines to determine the final rankings of teams ranked 9th and below. Games, which will be held from August 5 to 11, are held in the Mall of Asia Arena in Pasay and in the Ninoy Aquino Stadium in nearby Manila.

There are two classification rounds, both single-elimination tournaments: for 13th and 9th places. The classification for 13th place involves teams that finished last in the preliminary round. Since there were only three teams in Group B, the fourth-placed team in Group A received a bye to the 13th place playoff, with the loser between the teams from Groups C and D ranked 15th place.

For the classification for 9th place, teams that finished fifth and sixth in the second round participate. The losers in the first round play for 11th place, while the winners place 9th place.

For classification for 8th place and better, see 2013 FIBA Asia Championship final round.

== Classification 13th–15th ==
These are the teams that finished last in their respective preliminary round groups.

Semifinal; 5 August – Manila			13th place 6 August – Manila
			1	Saudi Arabia	93
2	Malaysia	56		Thailand	80
3	Thailand	71

=== Semifinal ===
5 August 2013
18:00

Report

Malaysia	56–71	Thailand
Scoring by quarter: 7–22, 20–9, 14–17, 15–23
Pts: Soo 19; Rebs: C.Y. Wong 9 Asts: Tong 3		Pts: Klaewnarong 16; Rebs: Tongsri 16; Asts: three players 2

Ninoy Aquino Stadium, Manila
Referees: Abdulkarim Shakeeb (BHR), Shin Gi-Rok (KOR), Glenn Cornelio (PHI)

Malaysia
#	Player	Min	FG		3FG		FT		REB			AST	PF	TO	STL	BS	Pts
#	Player	Min	M/A	%	M/A	%	M/A	%	OFF	DEF	TOT	AST	PF	TO	STL	BS	Pts
4	Eng Heng Soo	27:33	5-14	36	2-6	33	7-7	100	1	2	3	2	3	1	0	5	19
5	Sing Tee Ng	10:46	1-3	33	1-3	33	0-0	0	0	1	1	0	1	2	0	3	3
6	Wee Seng Wong	06:01	1-1	100	1-1	100	0-0	0	0	1	1	0	0	0	0	0	3
7	Wei Hong Choo	05:17	1-2	50	0-0	0	0-0	0	0	2	2	0	0	0	0	2	2
8	Ban Sin Ooi	23:07	1-9	11	0-3	0	3-4	75	0	3	3	2	5	0	0	3	5
9	Wen Keong Tong	22:16	2-9	22	2-4	50	0-0	0	1	0	1	3	4	0	0	0	6
10	Hong Hoong Gan	24:56	2-8	25	2-6	33	0-0	0	0	1	1	1	2	1	0	3	6
11	Tian Yuan Kuek	22:59	1-5	20	1-1	100	0-0	0	0	2	2	0	2	0	1	3	3
13	Chin Yong Wong	29:33	2-7	29	1-4	25	0-0	0	3	6	9	2	1	0	1	4	5
14	Lok Seng Mak	09:11	2-2	100	0-0	0	0-2	0	0	0	0	0	1	0	0	2	4
15	Min Joe Foong	18:14	0-2	0	0-0	0	0-0	0	1	4	5	1	0	0	2	4	0
Totals			18-62	29	10-28	36	10-13	77	6	22	28	11	19	4	4	29	56

Thailand
#	Player	Min	FG		3FG		FT		REB			AST	PF	TO	STL	BS	Pts
#	Player	Min	M/A	%	M/A	%	M/A	%	OFF	DEF	TOT	AST	PF	TO	STL	BS	Pts
4	Chanachon Klahan	06:51	1-1	100	1-1	100	1-2	50	0	1	1	0	0	1	0	0	4
5	Attaporn Lertmalaiporn	19:32	5-6	83	1-2	50	0-0	0	1	1	2	2	5	1	0	1	11
6	Wattana Suttisin	31:20	4-7	57	0-1	0	5-9	56	2	3	5	2	0	1	1	1	13
7	Danai Kongkum	19:16	0-1	0	0-0	0	1-2	50	0	3	3	2	3	0	0	3	1
8	Wutipong Dasom	14:16	1-5	20	0-0	0	0-2	0	0	2	2	1	3	0	0	1	2
9	Anasawee Klaewnarong	16:18	6-12	50	2-3	67	2-4	50	0	3	3	0	1	1	0	2	16
10	Darongpan Apiromvilaichai	14:27	0-4	0	0-0	0	5-8	63	2	1	3	1	0	0	0	0	5
11	Darunpong Apiromvilaichai	17:16	1-6	17	0-1	0	0-0	0	1	4	5	0	5	1	0	1	2
12	Sukhdave Ghogar	07:39	0-4	0	0-0	0	0-0	0	2	0	2	0	2	2	0	3	0
13	Kannawat Lertlaokul	20:16	1-2	50	1-1	100	0-0	0	1	3	4	1	2	0	0	1	3
14	Kannut Samerjai	01:57	0-0	0	0-0	0	2-4	50	0	2	2	0	0	0	0	0	2
15	Wacharapong Tongsri	30:48	3-8	38	0-0	0	6-8	75	4	12	16	1	1	0	0	1	12
Totals			22-56	39	5-9	56	22-39	56	13	35	48	10	22	7	1	14	71

=== 13th place ===
6 August 2013
18:00

Report

Saudi Arabia	93–80	Thailand
Scoring by quarter: 23–27, 29–24, 18–17, 23–12
Pts: Belal 21; Rebs: Mo. Al-Marwani, Kabe 6 Asts: M. Al-Muwallad 10		Pts: Lertmalaiporn, Klaewnarong 15; Rebs: Tongsri 7 Asts: Klaewnarong 3

Ninoy Aquino Stadium, Manila
Referees: Cheung Kwok Shun (HKG), Abdurahim Shareeb (BHR), Wang Xiao Chun (CHN)

Saudi Arabia
#	Player	Min	FG		3FG		FT		REB			AST	PF	TO	STL	BS	Pts
#	Player	Min	M/A	%	M/A	%	M/A	%	OFF	DEF	TOT	AST	PF	TO	STL	BS	Pts
4	Mohammed Al-Marwani	26:17	5-7	71	0-0	0	1-2	50	4	2	6	1	2	0	0	5	11
5	Marzouq Al-Muwallad	36:16	6-11	55	2-4	50	6-11	55	0	2	2	10	3	1	0	3	20
6	Mohammed Al-Sager	14:30	3-6	50	1-2	50	0-0	0	1	1	2	4	1	1	0	3	7
7	Jaber Kabe	21:08	4-7	57	0-3	0	0-0	0	1	5	6	2	4	1	0	3	8
8	Fahad Belal	30:00	6-15	40	3-12	25	6-6	100	0	4	4	2	2	1	0	2	21
9	Mustafa Al-Hwsawi	34:43	2-5	40	1-2	50	2-4	50	0	1	1	2	0	0	0	1	7
10	Mohammed Abujabal	Did not play															
11	Turki Al-Muhanna	Did not play															
12	Mathna Al-Marwani	07:35	2-4	50	0-0	0	1-1	100	0	1	1	0	1	0	0	0	5
13	Ahmed Al-Mukhtar	Did not play															
14	Ayman Al-Muwallad	22:02	3-8	38	1-3	33	5-7	71	1	3	4	3	3	0	0	4	12
15	Nassir Abo Jalas	07:26	1-4	25	0-0	0	0-0	0	1	2	3	1	0	0	0	1	2
Totals			32-67	48	8-26	31	21-31	68	8	21	29	25	16	4	0	22	93

Thailand
#	Player	Min	FG		3FG		FT		REB			AST	PF	TO	STL	BS	Pts
#	Player	Min	M/A	%	M/A	%	M/A	%	OFF	DEF	TOT	AST	PF	TO	STL	BS	Pts
4	Chanachon Klahan	16:06	3-9	33	2-5	40	0-0	0	1	4	5	0	0	0	0	3	8
5	Attaporn Lertmalaiporn	31:06	4-7	57	1-3	33	6-6	100	1	5	6	1	8	3	0	2	15
6	Wattana Suttisin	Did not play															
7	Danai Kongkum	04:16	0-0	0	0-0	0	0-0	0	0	0	0	1	1	0	0	1	0
8	Wutipong Dasom	24:04	4-8	50	0-1	0	1-2	50	1	3	4	2	1	2	1	3	9
9	Anasawee Klaewnarong	23:53	6-12	50	0-2	0	3-6	50	0	2	2	3	2	1	0	2	15
10	Darongpan Apiromvilaichai	15:55	2-4	50	0-0	0	3-4	75	1	1	2	0	2	0	0	1	7
11	Darunpong Apiromvilaichai	20:02	2-6	33	1-3	33	1-2	50	0	4	4	2	4	0	1	4	6
12	Sukhdave Ghogar	20:26	2-4	50	0-0	0	4-4	100	3	1	4	1	2	1	0	5	8
13	Kannawat Lertlaokul	09:29	0-2	0	0-2	0	0-0	0	2	0	2	2	3	0	0	1	0
14	Kannut Samerjai	Did not play															
15	Wacharapong Tongsri	34:39	6-12	50	0-0	0	0-1	0	2	5	7	2	2	0	3	4	12
Totals			29-64	45	4-16	25	18-25	72	11	25	36	14	25	7	5	26	80

== Classification 9th–12th ==
These are the teams that finished fifth and sixth in their respective second round groups.

Semifinals
9 August
Japan	73
India	64
9 August
Bahrain	79
Hong Kong	87

9th place
10 August
Japan	79
Hong Kong	50
11th place
10 August
India	75
Bahrain	65

=== Semifinals ===
==== Bahrain vs. Hong Kong ====
9 August 2013
10:30

Report

Bahrain	79–87	Hong Kong
Scoring by quarter: 18–30, 25–13, 16–20, 20–24
Pts: Al-Tawash 29; Rebs: Al-Tawash, Kawaid 5 Asts: Kawaid 5		Pts: Reid 20; Rebs: Fong 12; Asts: Fong 5

Mall of Asia Arena, Pasay
Referees: Naser Mohammad Ramadan Abu Rashed (JOR), Shin Gi-Rok (KOR), Thongchai Thaweewutsophon (THA)

Bahrain
#	Player	Min	FG		3FG		FT		REB			AST	PF	TO	STL	BS	Pts
#	Player	Min	M/A	%	M/A	%	M/A	%	OFF	DEF	TOT	AST	PF	TO	STL	BS	Pts
4	Mohamed Ebrahim	Did not play															
5	Hussain Al-Tawash	38:39	9-14	64	3-6	50	8-9	89	0	5	5	4	1	0	0	3	29
6	Mohamed Kawaid	33:28	6-11	55	1-3	33	1-2	50	1	4	5	5	1	1	1	0	14
7	Bader Malabes	Did not play															
8	Ahmed Ismaeel	Did not play															
9	Mohamed Alderazi	29:36	6-11	55	4-9	44	0-0	0	1	2	3	2	4	0	0	4	16
10	Abdul-Rahman Mubarak	24:52	4-7	57	3-6	50	0-0	0	0	1	1	4	1	0	0	0	11
11	Subah Azzam	25:06	2-4	50	0-0	0	0-0	0	1	1	2	0	1	0	0	2	4
12	Chester Giles	Did not play															
13	Yunes Kawaid	16:28	0-3	0	0-0	0	0-0	0	0	0	0	1	3	1	0	1	0
14	Ahmed Akber	31:48	2-2	100	0-0	0	1-2	50	2	1	3	1	1	1	1	4	5
15	Ahmed Aman	Did not play															
Totals			29-52	56	11-24	46	10-13	77	5	14	19	17	12	3	2	14	79

Hong Kong
#	Player	Min	FG		3FG		FT		REB			AST	PF	TO	STL	BS	Pts
#	Player	Min	M/A	%	M/A	%	M/A	%	OFF	DEF	TOT	AST	PF	TO	STL	BS	Pts
4	Man Chun Lam	17:11	3-5	60	1-1	100	4-4	100	3	2	5	2	1	0	0	1	11
5	Tsz Lai Lau	05:57	1-3	33	1-3	33	0-0	0	1	0	1	0	0	0	0	1	3
6	Ki Lee	24:04	5-13	38	4-10	40	2-2	100	1	3	4	1	0	0	0	2	16
7	Kim Wong Li	28:24	4-7	57	3-5	60	1-2	50	1	3	4	3	0	0	0	3	12
8	Siu Wing Chan	17:05	1-4	25	1-4	25	2-2	100	1	0	1	3	1	0	0	3	5
9	Tung Leung Lau	03:21	0-0	0	0-0	0	0-0	0	0	1	1	1	1	0	0	0	0
10	Yik Lun Chan	09:58	1-4	25	0-3	0	0-0	0	0	0	0	2	1	0	0	0	2
11	Chi Ho Poon	Did not play															
12	Shing Yee Fong	36:38	6-14	43	0-0	0	1-1	100	6	6	12	5	0	2	0	1	13
13	Chun Wai Wong	19:35	1-3	33	1-2	50	2-3	67	0	0	0	1	0	0	0	0	5
14	Duncan Overbeck Reid	37:43	10-14	71	0-0	0	0-1	0	6	1	7	3	5	0	0	3	20
15	Wai Kit Szeto	Did not play															
Totals			32-67	48	11-28	39	12-15	80	19	16	35	21	9	2	0	14	87

==== Japan vs. India ====
9 August 2013
12:45

Report

Japan	73–64	India
Scoring by quarter: 16–25, 13–16, 21–13, 23–10
Pts: Takeuchi, Tsuji 12; Rebs: Sakuragi 11; Asts: Sakuragi 4		Pts: Bhriguvanshi 12; Rebs: Bhriguvanshi, Pethani 8 Asts: Bhriguvanshi 6

Mall of Asia Arena, Pasay
Referees: Chen Ying-Cheng (TPE), Glenn Cornelio (PHI), Wang Xiao Chun (CHN)

Japan
#	Player	Min	FG		3FG		FT		REB			AST	PF	TO	STL	BS	Pts
#	Player	Min	M/A	%	M/A	%	M/A	%	OFF	DEF	TOT	AST	PF	TO	STL	BS	Pts
4	Keijuro Matsui	7:23	1-4	25	1-4	25	0-0	0	0	0	0	1	0	0	0	0	3
5	Daiki Tanaka	23:35	4-8	50	0-2	0	1-1	100	0	3	3	1	0	1	0	0	9
6	Makoto Hiejima	19:37	5-9	56	0-0	0	0-0	0	0	3	3	1	3	4	1	0	10
7	Atsuya Ota	14:35	3-5	60	0-0	0	4-6	67	3	1	4	0	1	0	0	0	10
8	Yuta Watanabe	00:09	1-1	100	0-0	0	0-0	0	0	0	0	0	0	0	0	0	2
9	Takahiro Kurihara	09:23	0-2	0	0-1	0	0-0	0	0	0	0	0	1	1	0	0	0
10	Kosuke Takeuchi	34:02	4-11	36	0-1	0	4-4	100	1	5	6	1	4	2	0	2	12
11	Ryota Sakurai	20:00	1-4	25	0-1	0	0-0	0	2	2	4	3	0	0	0	0	2
12	J.R. Sakuragi	27:41	3-5	60	0-0	0	4-9	44	1	10	11	4	2	3	3	1	10
13	Naoto Tsuji	23:22	3-8	38	1-4	25	5-6	83	0	1	1	3	3	0	1	1	12
14	Kosuke Kanamaru	16:37	0-5	0	0-3	0	0-0	0	0	4	4	1	1	0	0	0	0
15	Hiroshi Ichioka	03:31	1-2	50	0-0	0	1-1	100	1	0	1	0	1	0	0	0	3
Totals			26-64	41	2-16	13	19-27	70	8	29	37	15	16	11	5	4	73

India
#	Player	Min	FG		3FG		FT		REB			AST	PF	TO	STL	BS	Pts
#	Player	Min	M/A	%	M/A	%	M/A	%	OFF	DEF	TOT	AST	PF	TO	STL	BS	Pts
4	Sambhaji Kadam	Did not play															
5	Narender Kumar Grewal	21:37	1-5	20	0-1	0	4-4	100	0	1	1	0	2	1	0	0	6
6	Pratham Singh	29:09	1-4	25	1-3	33	1-2	50	0	3	3	0	1	1	0	0	4
7	Vinay Kaushik	Did not play															
8	Arjun Singh	Did not play															
9	Vishesh Bhriguvanshi	35:33	4-12	33	2-6	33	2-2	100	0	8	8	6	2	3	3	0	12
10	Amritpal Singh	10:04	3-5	60	0-0	0	0-1	0	1	0	1	5	1	0	0	6	
11	Joginder Singh	33:39	4-9	44	1-5	20	0-0	0	1	4	5	3	2	4	0	0	9
12	Satnam Singh Bhamara	Did not play															
13	Amjyot Singh	20:58	3-10	30	0-2	0	3-5	60	4	3	7	0	4	3	3	1	9
14	Yadwinder Singh	15:26	2-5	40	1-3	33	2-2	100	1	3	4	1	4	2	0	0	7
15	Rikin Shantilal Pethani	33:30	5-10	50	0-1	0	1-2	50	2	6	8	0	4	4	0	0	11
Totals			23-60	38	5-21	24	13-18	72	9	28	37	10	24	19	6	1	64

=== 11th place ===
10 August 2013
10:30

Report

India	75–65	Bahrain
Scoring by quarter: 27–13, 13–26, 13–12, 22–14
Pts: Bhriguvanshi 19; Rebs: Pethani 8 Asts: Bhriguvanshi 4		Pts: Al-Tawash 20; Rebs: Alderazi 9 Asts: Al-Tawash 6

Mall of Asia Arena, Pasay
Referees: Cheung Kwok Shun Andy (HKG), Peng Ling (CHN), Shin Gi-Rok (KOR)

India
#	Player	Min	FG		3FG		FT		REB			AST	PF	TO	STL	BS	Pts
#	Player	Min	M/A	%	M/A	%	M/A	%	OFF	DEF	TOT	AST	PF	TO	STL	BS	Pts
4	Sambhaji Kadam	Did not play															
5	Narender Kumar Grewal	08:21	0-2	0	0-2	0	0-0	0	0	1	1	1	1	0	0	0	0
6	Pratham Singh	39:09	6-12	50	2-8	25	2-2	100	1	1	2	2	3	1	0	0	16
7	Vinay Kaushik	02:38	0-0	0	0-0	0	2-2	100	0	0	0	0	0	0	1	0	2
8	Arjun Singh	01:53	0-1	0	0-0	0	1-2	50	1	0	1	0	0	1	0	0	1
9	Vishesh Bhriguvanshi	37:07	4-8	50	1-2	50	10-15	67	4	3	7	4	2	2	0	0	19
10	Amritpal Singh	03:35	1-1	100	0-0	0	0-0	0	1	1	2	0	5	3	0	0	2
11	Joginder Singh	27:35	1-8	13	1-7	14	4-6	67	0	1	1	1	4	1	0	0	7
12	Satnam Singh Bhamara	08:25	3-4	75	0-0	0	0-0	0	2	2	4	0	1	2	0	0	6
13	Amjyot Singh	20:39	2-7	29	0-0	0	5-5	100	2	5	7	0	5	1	0	2	9
14	Yadwinder Singh	22:35	2-7	29	0-1	0	3-4	75	2	5	7	0	2	1	0	2	7
15	Rikin Shantilal Pethani	27:58	2-7	29	0-0	0	2-2	100	1	7	8	2	3	1	0	0	6
Totals			21-57	37	4-20	20	29-38	76	14	26	40	10	26	13	1	4	75

Bahrain
#	Player	Min	FG		3FG		FT		REB			AST	PF	TO	STL	BS	Pts
#	Player	Min	M/A	%	M/A	%	M/A	%	OFF	DEF	TOT	AST	PF	TO	STL	BS	Pts
4	Mohamed Ebrahim	Did not play															
5	Hussain Al-Tawash	40:00	7-18	39	2-6	33	4-4	100	2	5	7	6	4	5	0	0	20
6	Mohamed Kawaid	11:37	2-4	50	0-0	0	0-1	0	0	1	1	0	2	0	1	0	4
7	Bader Malabes	Did not play															
8	Ahmed Ismaeel	Did not play															
9	Mohamed Alderazi	28:44	4-9	44	1-4	25	2-3	67	1	8	9	0	4	2	0	0	11
10	Abdul-Rahman Mubarak	24:58	2-7	29	1-3	33	0-0	0	0	2	2	0	5	2	1	0	5
11	Subah Azzam	28:22	1-1	100	0-0	0	6-8	75	2	5	7	2	4	2	1	2	8
12	Chester Giles	Did not play															
13	Yunes Kawaid	34:25	5-14	36	0-0	0	2-3	67	2	4	6	1	3	0	0	0	12
14	Ahmed Akber	31:28	2-3	67	0-0	0	1-6	17	3	2	5	0	5	2	1	5	5
15	Ahmed Aman	00:22	0-0	0	0-0	0	0-0	0	0	0	0	0	0	0	0	0	0
Totals			23-56	41	4-13	31	15-25	60	10	27	37	9	27	13	4	7	65

=== 9th place ===
10 August 2013
12:45

Report

Hong Kong	50–79	Japan
Scoring by quarter: 16–17, 13–21, 9–15, 12–26
Pts: Reid 18; Rebs: Reid 13; Asts: Lee 5		Pts: Kanamaru 25; Rebs: Ota 9 Asts: Tsuji 4

Mall of Asia Arena, Pasay
Referees: Snehal Bendke (IND), Glenn Cornelio (PHI), Wang Xiao Chun (CHN)

Hong Kong
#	Player	Min	FG		2FG		FT		REB			AST	PF	TO	STL	BS	Pts
#	Player	Min	M/A	%	M/A	%	M/A	%	OFF	DEF	TOT	AST	PF	TO	STL	BS	Pts
4	Man Chun Lam	08:21	0-1	0	0-1	0	0-0	0	2	2	4	0	2	0	0	0	0
5	Tsz Lai Lau	06:48	0-1	0	0-1	0	0-0	0	0	0	0	0	1	2	0	0	0
6	Ki Lee	21:21	2-8	25	1-6	17	3-4	75	0	1	1	0	1	4	1	0	8
7	Kim Wong Li	25:15	2-5	40	1-3	33	3-4	75	3	2	5	5	4	5	2	0	8
8	Siu Wing Chan	28:01	1-7	14	0-4	0	0-2	0	1	2	3	2	1	5	0	0	2
9	Tung Leung Lau	20:07	2-6	33	0-0	0	2-4	50	2	5	7	1	2	0	0	0	6
10	Yik Lun Chan	23:01	2-8	25	1-5	20	0-0	0	1	2	3	2	1	4	0	0	5
11	Chi Ho Poon	Did not play															
12	Shing Yee Fong	Did not play															
13	Chun Wai Wong	19:21	1-4	25	0-2	0	0-0	0	2	1	3	1	3	2	0	0	2
14	Duncan Overbeck Reid	38:45	8-16	50	0-1	0	2-3	67	5	8	13	1	2	2	0	1	18
15	Wai Kit Szeto	08:55	0-1	0	0-0	0	1-2	50	1	1	2	0	0	0	0	0	1
Totals			18-57	32	3-23	13	11-19	58	17	24	41	12	17	24	3	1	50

Japan
#	Player	Min	FG		2FG		FT		REB			AST	PF	TO	STL	BS	Pts
#	Player	Min	M/A	%	M/A	%	M/A	%	OFF	DEF	TOT	AST	PF	TO	STL	BS	Pts
4	Keijuro Matsui	10:14	1-3	33	0-1	0	0-0	0	0	0	0	1	0	0	0	0	2
5	Daiki Tanaka	09:24	0-1	0	0-1	0	0-0	0	0	0	0	0	0	0	0	0	0
6	Makoto Hiejima	13:44	1-5	20	0-1	0	0-0	0	1	0	1	2	2	1	1	0	2
7	Atsuya Ota	18:42	7-8	88	0-0	0	1-2	50	3	6	9	3	3	0	0	0	15
8	Yuta Watanabe	21:32	5-10	50	0-2	0	3-3	100	0	4	4	1	0	3	1	1	13
9	Takahiro Kurihara	15:32	1-2	50	0-1	0	0-0	0	1	3	4	1	3	2	1	0	2
10	Kosuke Takeuchi	26:13	0-6	0	0-0	0	2-2	100	2	6	8	3	2	0	0	0	2
11	Ryota Sakurai	19:35	1-3	33	0-1	0	2-2	100	0	1	1	1	3	2	1	0	4
12	J.R. Sakuragi	01:42	0-0	0	0-0	0	0-0	0	0	0	0	0	1	0	0	0	0
13	Naoto Tsuji	15:02	2-3	67	0-1	0	0-0	0	0	2	2	4	0	1	1	0	4
14	Kosuke Kanamaru	34:00	11-18	61	3-6	50	0-0	0	0	0	0	0	2	2	1	0	25
15	Hiroshi Ichioka	14:15	5-10	50	0-0	0	0-0	0	5	3	8	0	2	0	1	0	10
Totals			34-69	49	3-14	21	8-9	89	12	25	37	16	18	11	7	1	79
