= 2014 Philippine FIBA Basketball World Cup team =

Philippines
- Head coach: Chot Reyes
- Preliminary round: 6th in group 21st place overall
- Biggest win: 81–79 (OT) Senegal (4 September 2014)
- Biggest defeat: 70–82 Greece (31 August 2014)
Home	Away

The Philippines men's national basketball team played at the 2014 FIBA Basketball World Cup held in Spain. The 24-team tournament began on August 30, and the winner automatically qualified for the 2016 Summer Olympics in Rio de Janeiro, Brazil. The Philippines qualified for the World Cup by virtue of the silver medal won by their 2013 FIBA Asia Championship squad.

Team Philippines were eliminated on the preliminary round with a 1-4 standing, but almost all of their losses were close games and was won by a small margin. This was the first time in 40 years since the Philippine national squad made an appearance and won a game in the World Cup.

== Qualification ==
The Philippines qualified for the 2014 FIBA Basketball World Cup through their finish in the 2013 FIBA Asia Championship which was hosted at home. They secured their place in the world cup by winning 86–79 over South Korea in the semifinal despite failing to clinch the title losing 71–85 to Iran in the final.

Qualified for the 2014 FIBA Basketball World Cup

Rank	Team	Record	FIBA World Rankings		
Rank	Team	Record	Before	After	Change
1st place, gold medalist(s)	Iran	9–0	20	20	0
2nd place, silver medalist(s)	Philippines	7–2	45	34	+11
3rd place, bronze medalist(s)	South Korea	7–2	33	31	+2
4th	Chinese Taipei	6–3	42	44	−2
5th	China	6–3	11	12	−1
6th	Qatar	5–3	36	42	−6
7th	Jordan	4–5	30	30	0
8th	Kazakhstan	3–6	47	52	−5
9th	Japan	3–4	35	35	0
10th	Hong Kong	1–6	71	69	+2
11th	India	2–6	58	61	−3
12th	Bahrain	2–6	75	73	+2
13th	Saudi Arabia	1–3	69	76	−7
14th	Thailand	1–4	85	79	+6
15th	Malaysia	0–4	69	71	−2

== Exhibition games ==
On July 25, 2014, the Philippine national team left for the United States for a training camp in Miami. They had two tune up games in Miami, winning 95–74 over a Miami Pro-Am selection and 93–84 over the Elev8 Sports Institute team which included players from the NBA D-League in its lineup.

In Spain, the national team played against a selection team consisting of players from the Liga ACB. They secured a 89–58 win in that game.

The Philippines participated in the Antibes International Basketball Tournament which was held in Antibes, France. Their opener against France ended in a 68–75 defeat, and loss their two succeeding games against Australia (75–97) and Ukraine (64–114).

They returned to Spain to play against the Basque Country. They loss 75–66 in their tune up against the Spanish autonomous region. The Philippines had three more tune up games against three national teams; a 74–83 loss to Angola, a 74–65 win over Egypt, and a 79–86 defeat to the Dominican Republic. A planned game against Mexico was cancelled.

=== Summary ===
Miami training camp

3 August

Miami Pro-Am Selection (United States)	74–95	Philippines

Miami

3 August

Elev8 Sports Institute (United States)	84–93	Philippines

Miami

Antibes International Basketball Tournament

15 August
20:30 (UTC+2)

Report

France	75–68	Philippines
Scoring by quarter: 22–20, 13–19, 17–16, 23–13
Pts: Batum 16; Rebs: Batum 11; Asts: Diot 6		Pts: Blatche, Lee 12; Rebs: Blatche 7 Asts: Blatche, Norwood, Tenorio 2

Azur Arena, Antibes, France
Referees: Luigi Lamonica (ITA), Fernando Rocha (POR), Milija Vojinovic (SRB)

16 August
18:00 (UTC+2)

Report

Philippines	75–97	Australia
Scoring by quarter: 17–20, 25–27, 21–26, 12–24
Pts: Blatche 20; Rebs: Blatche 10; Asts: Alapag, Tenorio 3		Pts: Baynes 15; Rebs: Motum 12; Asts: Exum 6

Azur Arena, Antibes, France
Referees: Joseph Bissang (FRA), David Chambon (FRA), Abdel Hamzaoui (FRA)

17 August
18:00 (UTC+2)

Report

Ukraine	114–64	Philippines
Scoring by quarter: 21–16, 40–19, 22–13, 31–16
Pts: Lypovyy 16; Rebs: Lypovyy 8 Asts: Mishula 9		Pts: de Ocampo 11; Rebs: Douthit 8 Asts: Norwood 3

Azur Arena, Antibes, France
Referees: Joseph Bissang (FRA), David Chambon (FRA), Abdel Hamzaoui (FRA)

Spain training camp

10 August

Liga ACB Selection (Spain)	58–89	Philippines
Scoring by quarter: 16–23, 15–27, 11–17, 16–22
Pts: Hernangomez 12		Pts: Blatche 18

Vitoria-Gasteiz

19 August
20:30 (UTC+2)

Basque Country (Basque Country (autonomous community))	75–66	Philippines
Scoring by quarter: 23–12, 20–12, 14–15, 18–27
Pts: Cortaberria 14; Rebs: M.Uriz 7 Asts: Cortareberria 4		Pts: Blatche 19; Rebs: Pingris 9 Asts: Alapag 2

Polideportivo Municipal J.A. Gasca, San Sebastián
Referees: Antonio Sacristán, Rubén Sánchez, Paul Urbano

21 August

Philippines	74–83	Angola
Scoring by quarter: 17–17, 17–26, 16–21, 24–19
Pts: Blatche 33		Pts: Cipriano 29

San Sebastián

24 August

Philippines	74–65	Egypt
Pts: Chan 20

Palacio Multiusos, Guadalajara
Attendance: 3,500+

26 August

Philippines	79–86	Dominican Republic
Scoring by quarter: 21–21, 23–27, 9–9, 26–29
Pts: Norwood 17		Pts: Feldeine 15

Palacio Multiusos, Guadalajara

== Roster ==
In January 2014, the Philippines reportedly wanted JaVale McGee and Andray Blatche to be naturalized as a Filipino for them to be able to represent the country in the upcoming World Cup. Gilas Pilipinas coach Chot Reyes confirmed the development. Antipolo representative Robbie Puno filed House Bills 3784 and 3783, the naturalization bills of JaVale McGee and Andray Blatche. On June 11, 2014, Blatche officially became a Filipino citizen with President Benigno Aquino III signing the relevant legislation. Under FIBA eligibility rules, Blatche became eligible to play for the national squad as a naturalized player with only one player designated as such only allowed to be a part of any national team.

Greg Slaughter, Jared Dillinger, Marcio Lassiter and Paul Lee were invited to join the training pool of the national squad and to be part of the 18-man pool. Lassiter and Slaughter expressed gratitude for the decision but declined the invitation because they thought that the 12-man roster that played on the 2013 FIBA Asia Championship were the ones who were deserving to play because they worked hard and helped the team to advance to the World Cup. The 18-man squad was decreased to a 16-man squad. Later on, Jay Washington was added to the pool to form a 17-man squad.

Larry Fonacier, from the 2013 FIBA Asia roster, backed out of the training pool because of different foot and back injuries that had plagued him the past two years. The 17-man squad was decreased to 16 as Chot Reyes announced the 16-man squad. On August 18, 2014, the final 12-man roster was announced.

Philippines men's national basketball team - 2014 FIBA Basketball World Cup roster
Players
Coaches

Pos.	No.	Name	Age – Date of birth	Height	Club	Ctr.
G	4	Jimmy Alapag (C)	36 – 30 December 1977	1.75 m (5 ft 9 in)	Talk 'N Text Tropang Texters	(Philippines)
G	5	LA Tenorio	30 – 9 July 1984	1.73 m (5 ft 8 in)	Barangay Ginebra San Miguel	(Philippines)
G	6	Jeff Chan	31 – 11 February 1983	1.91 m (6 ft 3 in)	Rain or Shine Elasto Painters	(Philippines)
G	7	Jayson William	28 – 30 June 1986	1.80 m (5 ft 11 in)	Talk 'N Text Tropang Texters	(Philippines)
G	8	Gary David	36 – 13 July 1978	1.88 m (6 ft 2 in)	Meralco Bolts	(Philippines)
F	9	Ranidel de Ocampo	32 – 8 December 1981	1.98 m (6 ft 6 in)	Talk 'N Text Tropang Texters	(Philippines)
G/F	10	Gabe Norwood	29 – 9 February 1985	1.98 m (6 ft 6 in)	Rain or Shine Elasto Painters	(Philippines)
C	11	Andray Blatche	28 – 22 August 1986	2.11 m (6 ft 11 in)	Brooklyn Nets	(United States)
C	12	June Mar Fajardo	24 – 17 November 1989	2.09 m (6 ft 10 in)	San Miguel Beermen	(Philippines)
G	13	Paul Lee	25 – 14 February 1989	1.81 m (5 ft 11 in)	Rain or Shine Elasto Painters	(Philippines)
C	14	Japeth Aguilar	27 – 25 January 1987	2.06 m (6 ft 9 in)	Barangay Ginebra San Miguel	(Philippines)
F/C	15	Marc Pingris	32 – 16 October 1981	1.96 m (6 ft 5 in)	San Mig Super Coffee Mixers	(Philippines)

Head coach

- Chot Reyes

Assistant coach(es)

- Jong Uichico
- Josh Reyes
- Norman Black

Consultants

- Tab Baldwin
- Natxo Lezcano

Team manager

- Butch Antonio

Legend

- (C) Team captain
- Club – describes last
  club before the tournament
- Age – describes age
  on 30 August 2014

== Uniform ==
- Supplier: Nike
- Main sponsor: Smart Communications

Home	Away

== Preliminary round ==
Qualified for the final round
Eliminated

Pos	Team	Pld	W	L	PF	PA	PD	Pts	Qualification
1	Greece	5	5	0	414	349	+65	10	Round of 16
2	Croatia	5	3	2	414	398	+16	8 (Note: Head-to-head record: Croatia 1–0 Argentina)	Round of 16
3	Argentina	5	3	2	420	371	+49	8	Round of 16
4	Senegal	5	2	3	348	399	−51	7	Round of 16
5	Puerto Rico	5	1	4	388	446	−58	6 (Note: Head-to-head record: Puerto Rico 1–0 Philippines)	
6	Philippines	5	1	4	383	404	−21	6	

Source: FIBA archive
Rules for classification: 1) points; 2) head-to-head points; 3) head-to-head goal average; 4) head-to-head number of points scored.
Notes:

All times are local to Spain, UTC+2.

=== Croatia ===
30 August 2014
12:30

Boxscore

Croatia	81–78 (OT)	Philippines
Scoring by quarter: 23–9, 14–22, 20–18, 14–22, Overtime: 10–7
Pts: Bogdanović 26; Rebs: Tomić 11; Asts: Tomić, Šarić 4		Pts: Blatche 28; Rebs: Blatche 12; Asts: Alapag 6

Palacio Municipal de Deportes San Pablo, Seville
Attendance: 3,500
Referees: José Reyes (MEX), Mohammad Al-Amiri (KUW), Fernando Rocha (POR)

=== Greece ===
31 August 2014
20:00

Boxscore

Philippines	70–82	Greece
Scoring by quarter: 10–20, 17–17, 18–21, 25–24
Pts: Blatche 21; Rebs: Blatche 14; Asts: Alapag 3		Pts: Printezis 25; Rebs: Bourousis 10; Asts: Papanikolaou 4

Palacio Municipal de Deportes San Pablo, Seville
Attendance: 5,554
Referees: Luigi Lamonica (ITA), Mohammad Al-Amiri (KUW), Stephen Seibel (CAN)

=== Argentina ===
1 September 2014
17:30

Boxscore

Argentina	85–81	Philippines
Scoring by quarter: 22–25, 21–13, 28–23, 14–20
Pts: Scola 19; Rebs: Mata 9 Asts: Scola, Campazzo 4		Pts: de Ocampo 18; Rebs: Blatche 15; Asts: Castro, Alapag 2

Palacio Municipal de Deportes San Pablo, Seville
Attendance: 6,071
Referees: Ilija Belošević (SRB), Juan González (ESP), Carlos Julio (ANG)

=== Puerto Rico ===
3 September 2014
13:30

Boxscore

Philippines	73–77	Puerto Rico
Scoring by quarter: 25–13, 19–26, 13–22, 16–16
Pts: Blatche 25; Rebs: Blatche 14; Asts: de Ocampo 3		Pts: Barea 30; Rebs: Franklin 9 Asts: Rivera 3

Palacio Municipal de Deportes San Pablo, Seville
Attendance: 4,998
Referees: José Reyes (MEX), Juan González (ESP), Carlos Julio (ANG)

=== Senegal ===
4 September 2014
14:00

Boxscore

Senegal	79–81 (OT)	Philippines
Scoring by quarter: 19–13, 5–24, 20–12, 20–15, Overtime: 15–17
Pts: Faye 20; Rebs: Dieng 14; Asts: D'Almeida 13		Pts: Blatche, Alapag 18; Rebs: Blatche 14; Asts: Alapag 4

Palacio Municipal de Deportes San Pablo, Seville
Attendance: 5,132
Referees: Ilija Belošević (SRB), Fernando Rocha (POR), Carlos Julio (ANG)
