= 2015 Belgian Basketball Supercup =

betFirst Liège	Telenet Oostende
67	80
	1	2	3	4	Total
betFirst Liège	19	16	15	17	67
Telenet Oostende	20	16	15	29	80
- Date: September 26, 2015
- Venue: Sleuyter Arena, Ostend

The 2015 Belgian Basketball Supercup was the 19th edition of the annual super cup game in Belgian basketball. This year reigning champions Telenet Oostende faced off against betFirst Liège, last years Cup Finalists. The game will be held in the Sleuyter Arena, which is the first time the game is held outside Knokke.

Oostende won the game 80–67, to win its 9th Supercup.

== Teams ==
Team	Qualified as	Appearance
Telenet Oostende	2014–15 League Champions	14th
betFirst Liège	2014–15 Cup runner-up	3rd

== Match ==
September 26, 2015
20:30

Boxscore

Telenet Oostende	80–67	betFirst Liège
Scoring by quarter: 20–19, 16–16, 15–15, 29–17
Pts: Boukichou 18; Rebs: Boukichou 13; Asts: Boukichou 6 PIR: Boukichou 33		Pts: Iarochevitch 13; Rebs: Penninck 8 Asts: Morrison 3 PIR: Iarochevitch 15

Sleuyter Arena, Ostend

Oostende	betFirst

Game rules Game was played under FIBA rules. 2015 Supercup Winners Telenet Oostende; 9th title
