= 2013 FIBA Asia Championship final round =

Basketball tournament round

The final round of the 2013 FIBA Asia Championship was a series of games in the 2013 FIBA Asia Championship in the Philippines to determine the final rankings of teams ranked 8th and above. Games were held in the Mall of Asia Arena in Pasay from August 9 to 11.

The final round was a single-elimination tournament with a consolation round for fifth place and a third-place playoff. The finalists and the winner of the third place playoff qualified for the 2014 FIBA Basketball World Cup in Spain.

== Championship bracket ==
Quarterfinals
9 August – Pasay
Philippines	88
Kazakhstan	58
9 August – Pasay
South Korea	79
Qatar	52
9 August – Pasay
Iran	94
Jordan	50
9 August – Pasay
Chinese Taipei	96
China	78

Semifinals
10 August – Pasay
Philippines	86
South Korea	79
10 August – Pasay
Iran	79
Chinese Taipei	60

Final
11 August – Pasay
Philippines	71
Iran	85
3rd place
11 August – Pasay
South Korea	75
Chinese Taipei	57

== Consolation bracket ==
Semifinals
10 August – Pasay
Kazakhstan	67
Qatar	72
10 August – Pasay
Jordan	76
China	79

5th place
11 August – Pasay
Qatar	85
China	96
7th place
11 August – Pasay
Kazakhstan	59
Jordan	88

== Quarterfinals ==
=== Iran vs. Jordan ===
9 August
15:00

Report

Iran	94–50	Jordan
Scoring by quarter: 31–11, 22–17, 21–8, 20–14
Pts: Haddadi 20; Rebs: Sahakian 9 Asts: Kamrani 11		Pts: Baxter 13; Rebs: Hadrab 8 Asts: Baxter 4

Mall of Asia Arena, Pasay
Referees: Yuji Hirahara (JPN), Hatim Hamed Alharbi (KSA), Cheung Kwok Shun Andy (HKG)

Iran
#	Player	Min	FG		3FG		FT		REB			AST	PF	TO	STL	BS	Pts
#	Player	Min	M/A	%	M/A	%	M/A	%	OFF	DEF	TOT	AST	PF	TO	STL	BS	Pts
4	Mohammad Jamshidi	20:08	3-7	43	1-3	33	4-4	100	1	1	2	1	1	4	2	0	11
5	Aren Davoudi	15:44	0-4	0	0-2	0	0-0	0	1	0	1	1	5	2	1	0	0
6	Javad Davari	07:10	1-3	33	0-1	0	0-0	0	0	0	0	2	1	0	0	0	2
7	Mehdi Kamrani	25:37	5-11	45	0-2	0	1-2	50	0	3	3	11	0	0	2	0	11
8	Saman Veisi	07:39	0-1	0	0-0	0	0-0	0	0	3	3	1	1	1	0	0	0
9	Oshin Sahakian	19:33	5-5	100	1-1	100	3-3	100	5	4	9	2	4	0	1	0	14
10	Hamed Afagh	26:37	6-7	86	4-5	80	2-2	100	1	2	3	0	2	3	0	0	18
11	Hamed Sohrabnejad	05:58	2-2	100	1-1	100	0-0	0	0	1	1	0	0	0	0	0	5
12	Asghar Kardoust	12:46	1-2	50	0-0	0	0-0	0	1	1	2	0	1	0	0	1	2
13	Rouzbeh Arghavan	16:32	1-3	33	1-2	50	0-0	0	1	6	7	0	3	1	0	1	3
14	Samad Nikkhah Bahrami	17:00	2-6	33	2-4	50	2-2	100	0	2	2	3	3	3	1	0	8
15	Hamed Haddadi	25:08	7-13	54	0-1	0	6-8	75	2	6	8	0	1	1	1	3	20
Totals			33-64	52	10-22	45	18-21	86	12	29	41	21	22	15	8	5	94

Jordan
#	Player	Min	FG		3FG		FT		REB			AST	PF	TO	STL	BS	Pts
#	Player	Min	M/A	%	M/A	%	M/A	%	OFF	DEF	TOT	AST	PF	TO	STL	BS	Pts
4	Fadel Al-Najjar	11:32	0-3	0	0-1	0	1-2	50	0	2	2	0	1	1	0	0	1
5	Ahmad Al-Dwairi	15:52	2-2	100	0-0	0	0-0	0	1	1	2	0	2	2	0	0	4
6	Hani Alfaraj	14:30	1-4	25	0-2	0	0-1	0	0	0	0	1	2	1	1	1	2
7	Ahmad Alhamarsheh	24:16	1-6	17	0-2	0	3-4	75	1	1	2	0	3	2	2	0	5
8	Jimmy Baxter	29:05	4-14	29	2-5	40	3-7	43	1	1	2	4	1	2	1	0	13
9	Khaldoon Abu-Ruqayyah	10:29	1-2	50	0-1	0	2-4	50	0	0	0	0	1	0	0	0	4
10	Abdallah AbuQoura	09:50	1-3	33	0-0	0	0-0	0	1	0	1	0	0	1	0	2	2
11	Wesam Al-Sous	21:04	1-7	14	1-6	17	0-0	0	1	0	1	2	2	2	0	0	3
12	Mahmoud Abdeen	10:52	0-4	0	0-3	0	2-2	100	0	0	0	3	0	1	0	0	2
13	Mohammad Shaher Hussein	12:04	0-3	0	0-0	0	0-0	0	1	2	3	0	3	2	0	1	0
14	Mohammad Hadrab	24:26	2-3	67	2-2	100	2-2	100	2	6	8	1	3	2	0	0	8
15	Ali Jamal Zaghab	15:55	2-2	100	0-0	0	2-3	67	1	2	3	0	3	1	2	1	6
Totals			15-53	28	5-22	23	15-25	60	9	15	24	11	21	17	6	5	50

=== Chinese Taipei vs. China ===
9 August
17:45

Report

Chinese Taipei	96–78	China
Scoring by quarter: 20–28, 20–22, 31–12, 25–16
Pts: Davis 26; Rebs: Davis 10; Asts: Lin C.C. 7		Pts: Yi 22; Rebs: Yi 10; Asts: Guo 7

Mall of Asia Arena, Pasay
Referees: Yevgeniy Mikheyev (KAZ), Atanu Banerjee (IND), Abdulkarim Shakeeb (BHR)

Chinese Taipei
#	Player	Min	FG		3FG		FT		REB			AST	PF	TO	STL	BS	Pts
#	Player	Min	M/A	%	M/A	%	M/A	%	OFF	DEF	TOT	AST	PF	TO	STL	BS	Pts
4	Tseng Wen-ting	08:50	0-1	0	0-0	0	0-0	0	0	1	1	2	2	3	0	1	0
5	Quincy Davis	37:47	12-13	92	0-1	0	2-4	50	4	6	10	1	3	1	0	3	26
6	Lee Hsueh-lin	Did not play															
7	Tien Lei	33:21	4-9	44	3-4	75	2-2	100	1	4	5	4	3	1	3	1	13
8	Chen Shih-chieh	03:25	0-0	0	0-0	0	0-0	0	0	0	0	0	2	1	0	0	0
9	Hung Chih-shan	30:19	4-8	50	3-6	50	0-0	0	0	4	4	5	2	1	0	0	11
10	Chou Po-Chen	Did not play															
11	Yang Chin-min	04:10	0-0	0	0-0	0	1-2	50	0	1	1	0	1	0	0	0	1
12	Lin Chih-chieh	26:44	6-14	43	2-5	40	3-3	100	0	2	2	7	0	3	1	0	17
13	Lu Cheng-ju	20:37	3-5	60	1-3	33	0-0	0	0	1	1	0	4	2	1	0	7
14	Tsai Wen-cheng	34:42	7-10	70	1-1	100	6-9	67	3	4	7	2	1	1	1	0	21
15	Douglas Creighton	Did not play															
Totals			36-60	60	10-20	50	14-20	70	8	23	31	21	18	13	6	5	96

China
#	Player	Min	FG		3FG		FT		REB			AST	PF	TO	STL	BS	Pts
#	Player	Min	M/A	%	M/A	%	M/A	%	OFF	DEF	TOT	AST	PF	TO	STL	BS	Pts
4	Guo Ailun	24:58	1-6	17	0-3	0	0-2	0	0	1	1	7	2	1	2	0	2
5	Liu Xiaoyu	07:31	0-0	0	0-0	0	0-0	0	1	0	1	1	0	0	0	0	0
6	Chen Jianghua	02:08	0-1	0	0-1	0	0-0	0	0	0	0	0	0	0	0	0	0
7	Wang Shipeng	26:55	6-14	43	3-9	33	2-5	40	0	4	4	4	1	2	0	0	17
8	Zhu Fangyu	22:51	4-6	67	3-3	100	0-0	0	0	1	1	1	2	1	1	0	11
9	Sun Yue	19:44	0-3	0	0-3	0	0-0	0	0	0	0	3	3	0	0	0	0
10	Li Xiaoxu	Did not play															
11	Yi Jianlian	27:27	11-18	61	0-1	0	0-0	0	5	5	10	1	2	2	0	0	22
12	Zhang Bo	04:24	0-2	0	0-0	0	0-0	0	0	1	1	0	0	0	0	0	0
13	Wang Zhelin	15:26	4-7	57	0-0	0	2-2	100	2	2	4	1	2	1	1	0	10
14	Wang Zhizhi	20:39	2-4	50	1-2	50	4-4	100	2	1	3	1	4	3	0	0	9
15	Zhou Peng	27:50	2-6	33	0-2	0	3-3	100	1	3	4	0	1	2	0	1	7
Totals			30-67	45	7-24	29	11-16	69	11	18	29	19	17	12	4	1	78

=== Philippines vs. Kazakhstan ===
9 August
20:30

Report

Philippines	88–58	Kazakhstan
Scoring by quarter: 32–15, 19–25, 16–9, 21–9
Pts: David 22; Rebs: Douthit 10; Asts: three players 4		Pts: Dmitriy Klimov 14; Rebs: Ponarev 12; Asts: three players 3

Mall of Asia Arena, Pasay
Attendance: 17,273
Referees: Mohammad Alamiri (KUW), Snehal Bendke (IND), Tan Chin Siong (MAS)

Philippines
#	Player	Min	FG		3FG		FT		REB			AST	PF	TO	STL	BS	Pts
#	Player	Min	M/A	%	M/A	%	M/A	%	OFF	DEF	TOT	AST	PF	TO	STL	BS	Pts
4	Jimmy Alapag	11:24	1-3	33	0-2	0	0-0	0	0	1	1	1	1	0	0	0	2
5	LA Tenorio	17:23	1-5	20	1-4	25	0-0	0	1	4	5	4	1	1	0	0	3
6	Jeffrei Chan	20:06	3-9	33	1-6	17	0-0	0	0	2	2	3	0	1	0	0	7
7	Jayson William	17:43	4-5	80	2-3	67	3-4	75	0	1	1	4	1	0	1	0	13
8	Gary David	17:33	7-11	64	4-6	67	4-4	100	0	2	2	1	1	0	0	0	22
9	Ranidel de Ocampo	12:03	2-4	50	2-3	67	0-0	0	2	1	3	1	4	1	1	0	6
10	Gabe Norwood	20:42	4-4	100	2-2	100	0-0	0	0	2	2	1	1	0	0	1	10
11	Marcus Douthit	22:53	2-9	22	0-0	0	1-2	50	0	10	10	2	1	2	0	2	5
12	Larry Fonacier	15:05	1-6	17	1-4	25	0-0	0	1	1	2	4	0	0	1	0	3
13	June Mar Fajardo	03:45	0-1	0	0-0	0	0-0	0	0	3	3	0	4	2	0	0	0
14	Japeth Aguilar	24:06	3-4	75	0-0	0	5-6	83	1	8	9	1	2	2	0	2	11
15	Marc Pingris	17:10	3-4	75	0-0	0	0-0	0	1	2	3	1	4	0	0	2	6
Totals			31-65	48	13-30	43	13-16	81	6	37	43	23	20	9	3	7	88

Kazakhstan
#	Player	Min	FG		3FG		FT		REB			AST	PF	TO	STL	BS	Pts
#	Player	Min	M/A	%	M/A	%	M/A	%	OFF	DEF	TOT	AST	PF	TO	STL	BS	Pts
4	Timur Sultanov	18:23	1-2	50	1-2	50	0-0	0	0	1	1	1	1	3	0	0	3
5	Jerry Johnson	27:11	2-11	18	1-4	25	3-4	75	0	1	1	3	3	0	0	0	8
6	Rustam Murzagaliyev	21:37	2-5	40	1-2	50	0-0	0	0	1	1	2	0	1	0	0	5
7	Mikhail Yevstigneyev	13:15	3-9	33	0-0	0	0-0	0	3	1	4	1	0	2	1	0	6
8	Vitaliy Lapchenko	14:16	2-6	33	0-2	0	1-2	50	0	0	0	0	1	0	0	0	5
9	Nikolay Bazhini	03:32	0-1	0	0-1	0	0-0	0	0	2	2	0	0	0	0	0	0
10	Konstantin Dvirnyy	Did not play															
11	Anton Ponomarev	28:00	3-10	30	0-2	0	2-2	100	4	8	12	0	3	1	0	1	8
12	Dmitriy Klimov	24:43	4-8	50	4-7	57	2-2	100	1	8	9	3	3	1	0	0	14
13	Rustam Yargaliyev	24:20	1-5	20	0-2	0	0-0	0	0	3	3	3	1	1	0	0	2
14	Leonid Bondarovich	12:28	2-9	22	0-0	0	0-0	0	2	0	2	0	4	0	0	0	4
15	Alexander Zhigulin	12:11	1-3	33	1-3	33	0-0	0	0	3	3	0	0	1	0	0	3
Totals			21-69	30	8-25	32	8-10	80	10	28	38	13	16	10	1	1	58

=== Korea vs. Qatar ===
9 August
22:30

Report

South Korea	79–52	Qatar
Scoring by quarter: 24–14, 16–14, 21–14, 18–10
Pts: Cho 16; Rebs: Kim M.G. 7 Asts: Kim M.G., Kim T.S. 4		Pts: Hayes, Saeed 10; Rebs: Hayes 6 Asts: D. Musa 4

Mall of Asia Arena, Pasay
Referees: Harja Jaladri (INA), Toru Katayose (JPN), Amirhossein Safarzadeh (IRN)

South Korea
#	Player	Min	FG		3FG		FT		REB			AST	PF	TO	STL	BS	Pts
#	Player	Min	M/A	%	M/A	%	M/A	%	OFF	DEF	TOT	AST	PF	TO	STL	BS	Pts
4	Kim Min-Goo	25:12	2-11	18	0-6	0	5-5	100	2	5	7	4	2	1	1	0	9
5	Kim Sun-Hyung	14:31	3-7	43	1-1	100	0-0	0	0	4	4	1	0	0	0	0	7
6	Yang Dong-Geun	13:43	3-5	60	1-3	33	0-2	0	0	3	3	2	2	1	3	0	7
7	Kim Tae-Sul	19:56	2-5	40	2-3	67	0-0	0	0	3	3	4	1	1	0	0	6
8	Moon Seong-Gon	Did not play															
9	Yun Ho-Young	20:54	4-8	50	2-2	100	0-0	0	2	2	4	2	4	2	0	1	10
10	Cho Sung-Min	21:06	6-9	67	2-4	50	2-2	100	0	1	1	1	3	2	1	0	16
11	Kim Joo-Sung	31:47	2-7	29	0-0	0	0-0	0	1	2	3	3	3	1	2	0	4
12	Kim Jong-Kyu	16:11	3-5	60	0-0	0	0-0	0	3	2	5	2	2	0	0	0	6
13	Choi Jun-Yong	04:33	0-1	0	0-0	0	0-0	0	0	0	0	0	0	0	0	0	0
14	Lee Seung-Jun	15:49	5-9	56	0-2	0	2-2	100	0	3	3	0	2	1	0	0	12
15	Lee Jong-Hyun	16:11	1-2	50	0-0	0	0-0	0	1	3	4	0	1	1	1	1	2
Totals			31-69	45	8-21	38	9-11	82	9	28	37	19	20	10	8	2	79

Qatar
#	Player	Min	FG		3FG		FT		REB			AST	PF	TO	STL	BS	Pts
#	Player	Min	M/A	%	M/A	%	M/A	%	OFF	DEF	TOT	AST	PF	TO	STL	BS	Pts
4	Mansour El Hadary	21:57	1-5	20	0-2	0	1-1	100	1	1	2	0	4	5	0	1	3
5	Jarvis Hayes	20:04	3-8	38	0-2	0	4-4	100	0	6	6	1	0	1	1	1	10
6	Abdulrahman Saad	15:45	2-5	40	0-2	0	2-3	67	2	3	5	1	4	2	0	0	6
7	Daoud Musa	27:38	1-2	50	0-0	0	1-2	50	3	2	5	2	1	2	0	1	3
8	Khalid Suliman	26:59	2-7	29	0-0	0	6-8	75	2	1	3	2	0	1	1	0	10
9	Ali Turki Ali	07:58	2-3	67	2-3	67	0-0	0	0	1	1	0	1	1	0	0	6
10	Yasseen Musa	28:50	3-11	27	0-3	0	3-4	75	0	4	4	4	2	2	0	1	9
11	Erfan Ali Saeed	18:00	0-4	0	0-2	0	1-2	50	0	2	2	0	0	0	0	0	1
12	Mohammed Saleem Abdulla	10:00	1-6	17	0-2	0	0-0	0	0	3	3	0	0	0	0	0	2
13	Mohammed Yousef	14:22	0-2	0	0-0	0	0-0	0	3	1	4	0	2	1	0	1	0
14	Malek Saleem	03:45	0-0	0	0-0	0	0-0	0	0	0	0	0	0	0	0	0	0
15	Baker Ahmad Mohammed	04:35	1-2	50	0-1	0	0-0	0	0	0	0	1	0	1	0	0	2
Totals			16-55	29	2-17	12	18-24	75	11	24	35	11	14	16	2	5	52

== Semifinals 5th–8th ==
=== Jordan vs. China ===
10 August
15:00

Report

Jordan	76–79	China
Scoring by quarter: 12–18, 15–14, 25-–23, 24–24
Pts: Al-Sous 17; Rebs: Hadrab 8 Asts: Baxter 8		Pts: Wang Z.Z. 33; Rebs: Wang Z.Z. 7 Asts: Sun 6

Mall of Asia Arena, Pasay
Referees: Toru Katayose (JPN), Ricor Buaron (PHI), Tan Chin Siong (MAS)

Jordan
#	Player	Min	FG		3FG		FT		REB			AST	PF	TO	STL	BS	Pts
#	Player	Min	M/A	%	M/A	%	M/A	%	OFF	DEF	TOT	AST	PF	TO	STL	BS	Pts
4	Fadel Al-Najjar	07:55	0-1	0	0-1	0	0-0	0	0	0	0	2	1	0	0	0	0
5	Ahmad Al-Dwairi	04:33	0-1	0	0-0	0	1-2	50	0	0	0	0	5	1	0	1	1
6	Hani Alfaraj	13:13	3-4	75	1-1	100	0-0	0	2	1	3	1	0	1	0	0	7
7	Ahmad Alhamarsheh	22:27	2-4	50	1-2	50	1-1	100	0	5	5	0	5	2	1	0	6
8	Jimmy Baxter	38:20	4-13	31	0-3	0	5-6	83	0	1	1	8	1	0	1	0	13
9	Khaldoon Abu-Ruqayyah	04:49	1-3	33	0-2	0	0-0	0	0	0	0	0	1	2	0	0	2
10	Abdallah AbuQoura	Did not play															
11	Wesam Al-Sous	23:46	6-11	55	5-10	50	0-0	0	0	1	1	1	1	2	1	0	17
12	Mahmoud Abdeen	16:24	2-3	67	1-2	50	0-0	0	0	3	3	2	2	1	0	0	5
13	Mohammad Shaher Hussein	15:47	3-7	43	0-0	0	1-2	50	1	3	4	0	5	0	0	1	7
14	Mohammad Hadrab	33:02	4-11	36	0-3	0	5-6	83	3	5	8	3	1	3	0	2	13
15	Ali Jamal Zaghab	19:38	2-4	50	0-0	0	1-2	50	2	2	4	0	4	0	1	0	5
Totals			27-62	44	8-24	33	14-19	74	8	21	29	17	26	12	4	4	76

China
#	Player	Min	FG		3FG		FT		REB			AST	PF	TO	STL	BS	Pts
#	Player	Min	M/A	%	M/A	%	M/A	%	OFF	DEF	TOT	AST	PF	TO	STL	BS	Pts
4	Guo Ailun	10:56	0-2	0	0-1	0	0-0	0	0	0	0	2	2	0	0	0	0
5	Liu Xiaoyu	18:50	0-1	0	0-1	0	0-0	0	0	0	0	1	4	1	0	0	0
6	Chen Jianghua	Did not play															
7	Wang Shipeng	29:03	3-6	50	0-2	0	0-0	0	0	4	4	4	0	1	2	0	6
8	Zhu Fangyu	12:43	0-1	0	0-1	0	1-2	50	0	3	3	0	2	1	0	0	1
9	Sun Yue	21:53	0-4	0	0-1	0	0-0	0	0	5	5	6	3	0	0	0	0
10	Li Xiaoxu	Did not play															
11	Yi Jianlian	32:26	6-12	50	0-0	0	6-10	60	1	3	4	5	2	4	1	0	18
12	Zhang Bo	Did not play															
13	Wang Zhelin	16:12	3-7	43	0-0	0	2-4	50	1	3	4	0	1	0	1	0	8
14	Wang Zhizhi	23:03	12-13	92	0-0	0	9-12	75	2	5	7	3	3	0	0	0	33
15	Zhou Peng	34:49	5-7	71	1-3	33	2-4	50	0	2	2	0	2	4	1	0	13
Totals			29-53	55	1-9	11	20-32	63	4	25	29	21	19	11	5	0	79

=== Kazakhstan vs. Qatar ===
10 August
22:30

Report

Kazakhstan	67–72	Qatar
Scoring by quarter: 15–20, 17–19, 13–19, 22–14
Pts: Yevstigneyev 24; Rebs: Yevstigneyev 13; Asts: Johnson 4		Pts: Y. Musa 18; Rebs: El Hadary 6 Asts: D. Musa 3

Mall of Asia Arena, Pasay
Referees: Ferdinand Pascual (PHI), Chong Yun Aun (MAS), Yuri Hirahara (JPN)

Kazakhstan
#	Player	Min	FG		3FG		FT		REB			AST	PF	TO	STL	BS	Pts
#	Player	Min	M/A	%	M/A	%	M/A	%	OFF	DEF	TOT	AST	PF	TO	STL	BS	Pts
4	Timur Sultanov	19:45	3-5	60	2-3	67	0-0	0	0	1	1	3	4	1	0	0	8
5	Jerry Johnson	33:17	3-14	21	0-6	0	3-3	100	1	1	2	4	4	2	0	0	9
6	Rustam Murzagaliyev	09:37	0-1	0	0-1	0	0-0	0	0	0	0	2	1	0	0	0	0
7	Mikhail Yevstigneyev	25:39	10-15	67	0-1	0	4-5	80	6	7	13	1	3	3	0	0	24
8	Vitaliy Lapchenko	15:00	3-5	60	1-2	50	0-0	0	1	1	2	0	2	0	1	0	7
9	Nikolay Bazhini	07:08	1-1	100	0-0	0	0-0	0	0	2	2	0	1	1	0	0	2
10	Konstantin Dvirnyy	Did not play															
11	Anton Ponomarev	27:54	2-7	29	1-4	25	0-0	0	3	4	7	2	3	1	1	0	5
12	Dmitriy Klimov	22:08	0-2	0	0-2	0	2-4	50	1	7	8	1	3	2	0	0	2
13	Rustam Yargaliyev	28:02	4-15	27	0-5	0	0-0	0	0	1	1	3	2	5	0	0	8
14	Leonid Bondarovich	04:44	1-4	25	0-0	0	0-0	0	0	0	0	0	1	0	0	0	2
15	Alexander Zhigulin	06:40	0-1	0	0-1	0	0-0	0	0	0	0	0	0	0	0	0	0
Totals			27-70	39	4-25	16	9-12	75	12	24	36	16	24	15	2	0	67

Qatar
#	Player	Min	FG		3FG		FT		REB			AST	PF	TO	STL	BS	Pts
#	Player	Min	M/A	%	M/A	%	M/A	%	OFF	DEF	TOT	AST	PF	TO	STL	BS	Pts
4	Mansour El Hadary	27:33	1-3	33	0-0	0	5-8	63	0	6	6	2	2	1	0	0	7
5	Jarvis Hayes	Did not play															
6	Abdulrahman Saad	16:28	2-6	33	1-3	33	2-2	100	0	3	3	0	2	2	1	0	7
7	Daoud Musa	32:55	6-11	55	1-5	20	2-2	100	0	2	2	3	0	3	1	1	15
8	Khalid Suliman	11:42	0-1	0	0-1	0	1-2	50	1	2	3	1	3	1	0	0	1
9	Ali Turki Ali	23:31	3-8	38	1-5	20	1-2	50	2	3	5	0	1	1	0	0	8
10	Yasseen Musa	31:36	7-13	54	0-0	0	4-4	100	2	3	5	2	1	1	1	1	18
11	Erfan Ali Saeed	Did not play															
12	Mohammed Saleem Abdulla	21:59	0-4	0	0-1	0	2-2	100	0	3	3	0	3	1	0	0	2
13	Mohammed Yousef	21:44	0-4	0	0-1	0	2-2	100	1	3	4	2	4	1	1	1	2
14	Malek Saleem	Did not play															
15	Baker Ahmad Mohammed	12:27	3-7	43	0-0	0	6-8	75	2	1	3	0	0	2	0	0	12
Totals			22-57	39	3-16	19	25-32	78	8	26	34	10	16	13	4	3	72

== Semifinals ==
=== Iran vs. Chinese Taipei ===
10 August
17:45

Report

Iran	79–60	Chinese Taipei
Scoring by quarter: 14–23, 27–12, 19–4, 19–21
Pts: Kamrani 19; Rebs: Haddadi 14; Asts: Kamrani 6		Pts: Davis 16; Rebs: Davis, Tien 5 Asts: Tsai, Tseng 3

Mall of Asia Arena, Pasay
Referees: Arsen Andryushkin (KAZ), Harja Jaladri (INA), Jassim Abdullah (QAT)

Iran
#	Player	Min	FG		3FG		FT		REB			AST	PF	TO	STL	BS	Pts
#	Player	Min	M/A	%	M/A	%	M/A	%	OFF	DEF	TOT	AST	PF	TO	STL	BS	Pts
4	Mohammad Jamshidi	06:04	1-4	25	0-3	0	0-0	0	0	2	2	1	0	1	0	0	2
5	Aren Davoudi	19:25	1-2	50	0-1	0	0-0	0	3	1	4	3	3	2	0	0	2
6	Javad Davari	Did not play															
7	Mehdi Kamrani	29:42	8-10	80	1-3	33	2-4	50	0	6	6	6	3	1	2	0	19
8	Saman Veisi	Did not play															
9	Oshin Sahakian	26:34	6-11	55	0-3	0	1-2	50	1	7	8	3	2	1	0	0	13
10	Hamed Afagh	33:59	4-10	40	1-5	20	1-1	100	1	2	3	4	2	0	4	0	10
11	Hamed Sohrabnejad	08:57	0-2	0	0-1	0	0-0	0	0	2	2	0	2	0	0	0	0
12	Asghar Kardoust	12:19	3-4	75	0-0	0	2-2	100	2	3	5	0	0	0	0	1	8
13	Rouzbeh Arghavan	04:11	0-0	0	0-0	0	0-0	0	0	0	0	0	2	0	0	0	0
14	Samad Nikkhah Bahrami	33:56	4-12	33	0-1	0	0-0	0	2	1	3	2	1	1	2	0	8
15	Hamed Haddadi	24:48	8-17	47	0-1	0	1-4	25	8	6	14	0	3	5	0	0	17
Totals			35-72	49	2-18	11	7-13	54	17	30	47	19	18	11	8	1	79

Chinese Taipei
#	Player	Min	FG		3FG		FT		REB			AST	PF	TO	STL	BS	Pts
#	Player	Min	M/A	%	M/A	%	M/A	%	OFF	DEF	TOT	AST	PF	TO	STL	BS	Pts
4	Tseng Wen-ting	23:12	3-7	43	0-2	0	0-0	0	1	0	1	3	2	1	2	0	6
5	Quincy Davis	29:35	6-9	67	0-0	0	4-6	67	2	3	5	1	2	1	0	1	16
6	Lee Hsueh-lin	Did not play															
7	Tien Lei	21:03	1-8	13	1-4	25	1-1	100	0	5	5	1	1	2	1	0	4
8	Chen Shih-chieh	14:43	5-7	71	0-1	0	1-2	50	0	1	1	0	0	1	0	0	11
9	Hung Chih-shan	22:09	2-6	33	1-5	20	0-0	0	1	2	3	2	3	0	0	0	5
10	Chou Po-Chen	03:36	0-0	0	0-0	0	0-0	0	1	0	1	1	0	0	0	0	0
11	Yang Chin-min	10:59	1-2	50	0-1	0	0-0	0	0	1	1	0	0	1	0	0	2
12	Lin Chih-chieh	19:16	1-6	17	1-6	17	0-0	0	0	3	3	2	0	4	0	0	3
13	Lu Cheng-ju	13:24	2-6	33	1-4	25	0-0	0	0	2	2	0	1	2	1	0	5
14	Tsai Wen-cheng	31:49	3-6	50	0-1	0	0-0	0	0	2	2	3	1	4	0	0	6
15	Douglas Creighton	10:08	1-3	33	0-0	0	0-0	0	0	0	0	1	0	1	0	0	2
Totals			25-60	42	4-24	17	6-9	67	5	19	24	14	10	17	4	1	60

=== Philippines vs. Korea ===
10 August
20:30

Report

Philippines	86–79	South Korea
Scoring by quarter: 15–19, 21–20, 29–17, 21–23
Pts: William 17; Rebs: Pingris 10; Asts: de Ocampo, William 4		Pts: Kim M.G. 27; Rebs: Kim J.S., Kim T.S. 5 Asts: Yang D.G. 7

Mall of Asia Arena, Pasay
Attendance: 18,631
Referees: Mohammad Al Amiri (KUW), Yevgeniy Mikheyev (KAZ), Wang Mei (CHN)

Philippines
#	Player	Min	FG		3FG		FT		REB			AST	PF	TO	STL	BS	Pts
#	Player	Min	M/A	%	M/A	%	M/A	%	OFF	DEF	TOT	AST	PF	TO	STL	BS	Pts
4	Jimmy Alapag	17:07	5-8	63	4-7	57	0-0	0	2	1	3	1	2	2	0	0	14
5	LA Tenorio	17:56	4-10	40	1-3	33	0-0	0	2	1	3	1	3	0	0	0	9
6	Jeffrei Chan	21:22	2-4	50	1-2	50	0-0	0	0	1	1	0	2	0	0	0	5
7	Jayson William	23:33	8-13	62	1-2	50	0-1	0	0	3	3	3	1	2	0	1	17
8	Gary David	04:23	0-3	0	0-1	0	0-0	0	2	0	2	0	1	0	1	0	0
9	Ranidel de Ocampo	23:47	5-9	56	1-2	50	0-0	0	1	5	6	3	3	1	0	1	11
10	Gabe Norwood	26:52	1-6	17	0-2	0	0-0	0	0	2	2	1	1	0	0	1	2
11	Marcus Douthit	13:14	0-5	0	0-0	0	2-2	100	2	1	3	1	0	0	0	2	2
12	Larry Fonacier	08:56	1-2	50	0-1	0	0-0	0	1	0	1	0	2	1	0	0	2
13	June Mar Fajardo	Did not play															
14	Japeth Aguilar	18:33	4-6	67	0-1	0	0-0	0	1	3	4	0	3	1	0	1	8
15	Marc Pingris	24:12	7-8	88	0-0	0	2-3	67	6	4	10	1	2	0	1	0	16
Totals			37-74	50	8-21	38	4-6	67	17	21	38	11	20	7	2	6	86

South Korea
#	Player	Min	FG		3FG		FT		REB			AST	PF	TO	STL	BS	Pts
#	Player	Min	M/A	%	M/A	%	M/A	%	OFF	DEF	TOT	AST	PF	TO	STL	BS	Pts
4	Kim Min-Goo	30:21	9-15	60	5-11	45	4-4	100	0	1	1	1	2	0	0	0	27
5	Kim Sun-Hyung	11:33	1-7	14	0-2	0	0-0	0	0	0	0	1	0	1	0	0	2
6	Yang Dong-Geun	32:34	3-11	27	1-5	20	4-4	100	1	2	3	7	0	0	1	0	11
7	Kim Tae-Sul	15:10	1-3	33	0-0	0	0-0	0	1	4	5	4	3	0	0	1	2
8	Moon Seong-Gon	Did not play															
9	Yun Ho-Young	08:53	0-0	0	0-0	0	0-0	0	0	2	2	0	0	0	0	0	0
10	Cho Sung-Min	21:30	2-5	40	2-4	50	0-0	0	0	0	0	1	4	2	0	0	6
11	Kim Joo-Sung	21:19	4-9	44	0-0	0	3-3	100	1	3	4	2	0	1	0	2	11
12	Kim Jong-Kyu	21:53	0-4	0	0-0	0	0-0	0	1	4	5	0	1	3	0	2	0
13	Choi Jun-Yong	Did not play															
14	Lee Seung-Jun	21:40	4-5	80	0-0	0	2-4	50	1	2	3	3	0	1	0	1	10
15	Lee Jong-Hyun	15:02	4-4	100	0-0	0	2-2	100	2	2	4	1	0	0	0	0	10
Totals			28-63	44	8-22	36	15-17	88	7	20	27	20	10	8	1	6	79

== 7th place ==
=== Jordan vs. Kazakhstan ===
11 August
12:30

Report

Jordan	88–59	Kazakhstan
Scoring by quarter: 30–18, 25–14, 18–12, 15–15
Pts: Abdeen 20; Rebs: Al-Najjar 7 Asts: Al-Najjar, Baxter 8		Pts: Yargaliyev 17; Rebs: Yevstigneyev 9 Asts: Johnson 3

Mall of Asia Arena, Pasay
Referees: Atanu Banerjee (IND), Wang Mei (CHN), Andy Cheung Kwok Shun (HKG)

Jordan
#	Player	Min	FG		3FG		FT		REB			AST	PF	TO	STL	BS	Pts
#	Player	Min	M/A	%	M/A	%	M/A	%	OFF	DEF	TOT	AST	PF	TO	STL	BS	Pts
4	Fadel Al-Najjar	26:05	2-7	29	1-4	25	0-0	0	1	6	7	8	3	4	0	0	5
5	Ahmad Al-Dwairi	20:07	5-7	71	0-0	0	0-0	0	2	1	3	1	2	0	1	1	10
6	Hani Alfaraj	24:41	6-9	67	2-2	100	1-1	100	0	4	4	1	3	0	1	0	15
7	Ahmad Alhamarsheh	20:09	1-1	100	0-0	0	2-2	100	0	4	4	6	1	0	0	0	4
8	Jimmy Baxter	18:47	4-7	57	3-4	75	1-2	50	0	0	0	8	1	1	0	0	12
9	Khaldoon Abu-Ruqayyah	23:27	3-6	50	1-3	33	1-3	33	0	3	3	1	0	2	1	0	8
10	Abdallah AbuQoura	17:57	0-1	0	0-0	0	2-6	33	1	3	4	0	1	2	0	0	2
11	Wesam Al-Sous	Did not play															
12	Mahmoud Abdeen	15:13	7-8	88	4-5	80	2-2	100	0	2	2	2	2	0	1	0	20
13	Mohammad Shaher Hussein	16:24	5-10	50	0-0	0	0-0	0	1	5	6	0	5	2	0	1	10
14	Mohammad Hadrab	Did not play															
15	Ali Jamal Zaghab	17:04	1-2	50	0-0	0	0-2	0	0	5	5	0	0	1	0	0	2
Totals			34-58	59	11-18	61	9-18	50	5	33	38	27	18	12	4	2	88

Kazakhstan
#	Player	Min	FG		3FG		FT		REB			AST	PF	TO	STL	BS	Pts
#	Player	Min	M/A	%	M/A	%	M/A	%	OFF	DEF	TOT	AST	PF	TO	STL	BS	Pts
4	Timur Sultanov	26:23	2-6	33	1-4	25	0-0	0	1	2	3	2	3	4	2	0	5
5	Jerry Johnson	24:06	1-5	20	1-2	50	1-2	50	1	1	2	3	2	0	1	0	4
6	Rustam Murzagaliyev	Did not play															
7	Mikhail Yevstigneyev	20:43	3-16	19	1-2	50	2-2	100	4	5	9	0	3	2	2	0	9
8	Vitaliy Lapchenko	18:28	0-2	0	0-1	0	0-0	0	1	3	4	0	2	2	0	0	0
9	Nikolay Bazhini	23:58	3-8	38	1-4	25	0-0	0	1	3	4	1	1	0	1	2	7
10	Konstantin Dvirnyy	Did not play															
11	Anton Ponomarev	05:30	2-2	100	0-0	0	0-0	0	0	0	0	0	0	0	0	0	4
12	Dmitriy Klimov	15:41	3-7	43	1-3	33	1-2	50	2	3	5	1	1	3	0	0	8
13	Rustam Yargaliyev	32:42	7-12	58	2-6	33	1-2	50	0	1	1	1	1	1	0	0	17
14	Leonid Bondarovich	08:25	0-2	0	0-0	0	2-2	100	0	1	1	0	1	1	0	0	2
15	Alexander Zhigulin	23:58	0-2	0	0-2	0	3-4	75	0	3	3	0	5	1	0	0	3
Totals			21-62	34	7-24	29	10-14	71	10	22	32	8	19	14	6	2	59

== 5th place ==
=== Qatar vs. China ===
11 August
14:45

Report

Qatar	85–96	China
Scoring by quarter: 21–20, 19–25, 15–25, 30–26
Pts: El Hadary 23; Rebs: Abdulla 10; Asts: El Hadary 5		Pts: Guo 21; Rebs: Wang Z.Z. 11; Asts: Guo 5

Mall of Asia Arena, Pasay
Referees: Toru Katayose (JPN), Yevgeniy Mikheyev (KAZ), Amirhossein Safarzadeh (IRI)

Qatar
#	Player	Min	FG		3FG		FT		REB			AST	PF	TO	STL	BS	Pts
#	Player	Min	M/A	%	M/A	%	M/A	%	OFF	DEF	TOT	AST	PF	TO	STL	BS	Pts
4	Mansour El Hadary	35:09	9-14	64	2-2	100	3-4	75	1	2	3	5	1	0	0	3	23
5	Jarvis Hayes	Did not play															
6	Abdulrahman Saad	15:09	5-9	56	3-6	50	0-0	0	2	2	4	3	0	3	0	3	13
7	Daoud Musa	29:14	1-6	17	0-5	0	3-4	75	0	4	4	4	2	1	0	2	5
8	Khalid Suliman	12:32	0-3	0	0-2	0	2-4	50	0	1	1	1	4	2	0	0	2
9	Ali Turki Ali	21:52	1-7	14	0-6	0	0-0	0	0	2	2	2	1	0	0	1	2
10	Yasseen Musa	Did not play															
11	Erfan Ali Saeed	Did not play															
12	Mohammed Saleem Abdulla	29:06	1-5	20	0-1	0	0-0	0	2	8	10	0	1	0	0	5	2
13	Mohammed Yousef	27:21	5-9	56	0-1	0	3-3	100	4	3	7	0	5	0	0	5	13
14	Malek Saleem	07:39	1-3	33	1-2	50	0-0	0	0	0	0	0	0	0	0	2	3
15	Baker Ahmad Mohammed	21:52	10-11	91	0-0	0	2-3	67	0	2	2	3	2	3	0	2	22
Totals			33-67	49	6-25	24	13-18	72	9	24	33	18	16	9	0	23	85

China
#	Player	Min	FG		3FG		FT		REB			AST	PF	TO	STL	BS	Pts
#	Player	Min	M/A	%	M/A	%	M/A	%	OFF	DEF	TOT	AST	PF	TO	STL	BS	Pts
4	Guo Ailun	25:54	8-10	80	0-2	0	5-6	83	0	1	1	5	0	1	0	3	21
5	Liu Xiaoyu	13:11	1-2	50	0-0	0	0-0	0	0	1	1	2	0	0	0	2	2
6	Chen Jianghua	Did not play															
7	Wang Shipeng	30:43	4-8	50	4-7	57	2-2	100	0	2	2	2	3	1	0	1	14
8	Zhu Fangyu	28:53	3-5	60	2-4	50	2-4	50	2	2	4	1	2	1	0	3	10
9	Sun Yue	09:36	1-1	100	1-1	100	0-0	0	0	2	2	1	0	0	0	1	3
10	Li Xiaoxu	Did not play															
11	Yi Jianlian	21:00	5-10	50	0-1	0	2-2	100	2	1	3	2	2	0	1	4	12
12	Zhang Bo	15:05	1-1	100	0-0	0	2-2	100	1	0	1	2	0	0	0	1	4
13	Wang Zhelin	14:51	4-6	67	0-0	0	1-2	50	2	3	5	0	3	0	0	4	9
14	Wang Zhizhi	18:48	3-8	38	0-0	0	7-9	78	2	9	11	1	3	0	1	0	13
15	Zhou Peng	21:55	3-11	27	1-3	33	1-2	50	1	5	6	0	4	1	0	1	8
Totals			33-62	53	8-18	44	22-29	76	10	26	36	16	17	4	2	20	96

== 3rd place ==
=== Chinese Taipei vs. Korea ===
11 August
17:00

Report

Chinese Taipei	57–75	South Korea
Scoring by quarter: 13–29, 16–21, 15–11, 13–14
Pts: Lu 13; Rebs: Davis 8 Asts: Lin C.C. 4		Pts: Kim M.G. 21; Rebs: Kim J.S., Yun 8 Asts: Yang D.G 8

Mall of Asia Arena, Pasay
Referees: Ferdinand Pascual (PHI), Mohammad Alamiri (KUW), Hatim Hamed Alharbi (KSA)

Chinese Taipei
#	Player	Min	FG		3FG		FT		REB			AST	PF	TO	STL	BS	Pts
#	Player	Min	M/A	%	M/A	%	M/A	%	OFF	DEF	TOT	AST	PF	TO	STL	BS	Pts
4	Tseng Wen-ting	20:42	3-6	50	0-0	0	1-5	20	3	2	5	1	1	1	0	1	7
5	Quincy Davis	36:25	4-6	67	0-0	0	4-8	50	1	7	8	1	1	2	0	1	12
6	Lee Hsueh-lin	Did not play															
7	Tien Lei	22:51	3-6	50	1-3	33	1-1	100	1	3	4	1	1	3	1	0	8
8	Chen Shih-chieh	16:00	1-8	13	0-2	0	4-4	100	1	0	1	3	2	1	1	0	6
9	Hung Chih-shan	27:20	2-5	40	2-5	40	0-0	0	0	5	5	2	4	2	0	0	6
10	Chou Po-Chen	Did not play															
11	Yang Chin-min	04:07	1-2	50	0-1	0	0-0	0	0	0	0	0	0	0	0	0	2
12	Lin Chih-chieh	19:57	0-6	0	0-3	0	0-0	0	0	2	2	4	0	4	2	0	0
13	Lu Cheng-ju	24:59	5-10	50	2-5	40	1-1	100	0	1	1	0	3	3	0	0	13
14	Tsai Wen-cheng	27:34	1-6	17	0-1	0	1-2	50	2	4	6	0	1	1	0	0	3
15	Douglas Creighton	Did not play															
Totals			20-55	36	5-20	25	12-21	57	8	24	32	12	13	17	4	2	57

South Korea
#	Player	Min	FG		3FG		FT		REB			AST	PF	TO	STL	BS	Pts
#	Player	Min	M/A	%	M/A	%	M/A	%	OFF	DEF	TOT	AST	PF	TO	STL	BS	Pts
4	Kim Min-Goo	24:52	8-14	57	5-10	50	0-0	0	3	1	4	3	1	1	1	1	21
5	Kim Sun-Hyung	Did not play															
6	Yang Dong-Geun	29:00	3-11	27	1-5	20	2-2	100	0	2	2	8	3	2	0	2	9
7	Kim Tae-Sul	14:08	2-5	40	1-1	100	2-2	100	0	3	3	1	0	0	2	0	7
8	Moon Seong-Gon	Did not play															
9	Yun Ho-Young	20:10	4-6	67	1-1	100	0-0	0	1	7	8	2	5	0	1	0	9
10	Cho Sung-Min	31:48	3-7	43	3-5	60	2-2	100	0	2	2	4	3	0	0	0	11
11	Kim Joo-Sung	28:05	6-14	43	0-1	0	0-0	0	3	5	8	1	3	1	0	0	12
12	Kim Jong-Kyu	22:41	2-4	50	0-0	0	0-0	0	1	3	4	1	3	1	0	0	4
13	Choi Jun-Yong	Did not play															
14	Lee Seung-Jun	12:27	0-2	0	0-1	0	0-0	0	1	1	2	0	2	2	1	0	0
15	Lee Jong-Hyun	16:45	1-2	50	0-0	0	0-0	0	1	1	2	1	2	2	0	3	2
Totals			29-65	45	11-24	46	6-6	100	10	25	35	21	22	9	5	6	75

== Final ==
=== Philippines vs. Iran ===
11 August
19:30

Report

Philippines	71–85	Iran
Scoring by quarter: 15–17, 19–18, 19–27, 18–23
Pts: William 18; Rebs: Pingris 8 Asts: Alapag 3		Pts: Haddadi 29; Rebs: Haddadi 16; Asts: Bahrami 7

Mall of Asia Arena, Pasay
Attendance: 19,987
Referees: Arsen Andryushkin (KAZ), Yuji Hirahara (JPN), Harja Jaladri (INA)

Philippines
#	Player	Min	FG		3FG		FT		REB			AST	PF	TO	STL	BS	Pts
#	Player	Min	M/A	%	M/A	%	M/A	%	OFF	DEF	TOT	AST	PF	TO	STL	BS	Pts
4	Jimmy Alapag	20:38	4-8	50	3-6	50	2-2	100	0	0	0	3	1	1	0	0	13
5	LA Tenorio	19:09	3-8	38	2-6	33	0-0	0	0	3	3	3	3	1	1	0	8
6	Jeffrei Chan	15:38	2-6	33	1-5	20	2-2	100	1	1	2	0	2	1	0	0	7
7	Jayson William	27:55	5-13	38	1-2	50	7-9	78	0	1	1	3	0	3	0	0	18
8	Gary David	05:16	1-3	33	0-0	0	0-0	0	0	0	0	1	3	0	0	0	2
9	Ranidel de Ocampo	27:09	3-13	23	2-8	25	1-1	100	3	3	6	1	4	1	3	0	9
10	Gabe Norwood	27:32	0-4	0	0-2	0	3-4	75	1	2	3	2	3	1	3	0	3
11	Marcus Douthit	Did not play															
12	Larry Fonacier	11:26	1-4	25	1-3	33	0-0	0	0	1	1	1	1	0	0	0	3
13	June Mar Fajardo	08:17	0-2	0	0-0	0	1-2	50	3	1	4	0	2	1	0	0	1
14	Japeth Aguilar	16:58	2-7	29	0-2	0	0-1	0	1	3	4	0	4	0	1	0	4
15	Marc Pingris	19:56	1-1	100	0-0	0	1-2	50	3	5	8	0	3	1	2	0	3
Totals			22-69	32	10-34	29	17-23	74	12	20	32	14	26	10	10	0	71

Iran
#	Player	Min	FG		3FG		FT		REB			AST	PF	TO	STL	BS	Pts
#	Player	Min	M/A	%	M/A	%	M/A	%	OFF	DEF	TOT	AST	PF	TO	STL	BS	Pts
4	Mohammad Jamshidi	Did not play															
5	Aren Davoudi	21:46	1-3	33	0-2	0	0-0	0	0	2	2	3	1	1	0	0	2
6	Javad Davari	Did not play															
7	Mehdi Kamrani	35:09	5-13	38	2-6	33	3-4	75	3	4	7	5	3	3	1	0	15
8	Saman Veisi	Did not play															
9	Oshin Sahakian	28:40	3-7	43	0-3	0	6-6	100	1	11	12	2	4	1	0	0	12
10	Hamed Afagh	33:57	2-6	33	0-4	0	0-0	0	2	3	5	1	1	3	1	0	4
11	Hamed Sohrabnejad	10:01	1-2	50	0-0	0	0-0	0	0	4	4	0	2	1	0	0	2
12	Asghar Kardoust	08:36	1-1	100	0-0	0	0-0	0	0	2	2	0	1	0	0	0	2
13	Rouzbeh Arghavan	00:48	0-0	0	0-0	0	0-0	0	0	0	0	0	1	0	0	0	0
14	Samad Nikkhah Bahrami	31:54	5-14	36	1-2	50	8-9	89	1	2	3	7	4	6	0	0	19
15	Hamed Haddadi	29:06	12-15	80	0-0	0	5-7	71	6	10	16	2	4	3	0	2	29
Totals			30-61	49	3-17	18	22-26	85	13	38	51	20	21	18	2	2	85
