= Wacharapong Tongsri =

Thai basketball player

Personal information
- Born: February 12, 1985 (age 41) Nakhon Nayok, Thailand
- Listed height: 5 ft 10 in (1.78 m)

Career information
- Playing career: 2012–present
- Position: Shooting guard

Wacharapong Tongsri (Thai: วัชระพงษ์ทองศรี; born February 12, 1985, in Nakhon Nayok, Thailand) is a Thai professional basketball player. He currently plays for the PEA Sports Club of the Thailand Basketball League. Tongsri is arguably Thailand's most prominent basketball figure.

He played most minutes and grabbed most rebounds for the Thailand national basketball team at the 2013 FIBA Asia Championship in the Philippines.

== Career overview ==
Wacharapong Tongsri played professional basketball for the following teams:

- 2012-14 Thailand Slammers
- 2015–present PEA (Thailand)
