= 2013 FIBA Asia Championship final =

- Event: 2014 FIBA Basketball World Cup
Iran	Philippines
(Iran)	(Philippines)
85	71
	1	2	3	4	Total
Iran	17	18	27	23	85
Philippines	15	19	19	18	71
- Date: 11 August 2015
- Venue: Mall of Asia Arena, Pasay
- Coaches: Memi Bečirovič (Iran); Chot Reyes (Philippines)
- Referees: Arsen Andryushkin; Yuji Hirahara; Harja Jaladri
- Attendance: 19,989

The final match of the 2013 FIBA Asia Championship was the game of the 2013 FIBA Asia Championship in the Philippines to determine the champion and runner-up. The game currently holds the most watched FIBA game in a tournament, even beating the FIBA Basketball World Cup.

== Road to the final ==
Iran		Results	Philippines	
Malaysia	115–25	Preliminary round	78–66	Saudi Arabia
South Korea	76–65	Preliminary round	77–71	Jordan
China	70–51	Preliminary round	79–84	Chinese Taipei
Team / Pld / W / L / PF / PA / PD / Pts; Iran / 3 / 3 / 0 / 261 / 141 / +120 / 6; South Korea / 3 / 2 / 1 / 208 / 193 / +15 / 5; China / 3 / 1 / 2 / 223 / 155 / +68 / 4; Malaysia / 3 / 0 / 3 / 105 / 308 / −203 / 3		Preliminary round	Team / Pld / W / L / PF / PA / PD / Pts; Chinese Taipei / 3 / 3 / 0 / 265 / 233 / +32 / 6; Philippines / 3 / 2 / 1 / 234 / 221 / +13 / 5; Jordan / 3 / 1 / 2 / 221 / 215 / +6 / 4; Saudi Arabia / 3 / 0 / 3 / 180 / 231 / −51 / 3	
India	102–56	Second round	90–71	Japan
Bahrain	75–56	Second round	80–70	Qatar
Kazakhstan	85–53	Second round	67–55	Hong Kong
Team / Pld / W / L / PF / PA / PD / Pts; Iran / 5 / 5 / 0 / 408 / 283 / +125 / 10; South Korea / 5 / 4 / 1 / 390 / 287 / +103 / 9; China / 5 / 3 / 2 / 350 / 311 / +39 / 8; Kazakhstan / 5 / 2 / 3 / 326 / 372 / −46 / 7; Bahrain / 5 / 1 / 4 / 331 / 418 / −87 / 6; India / 5 / 0 / 5 / 304 / 438 / −134 / 5		Second round	Team / Pld / W / L / PF / PA / PD / Pts / Tie; Philippines / 5 / 4 / 1 / 393 / 351 / +42 / 9 / 1–1, 1.03; Chinese Taipei / 5 / 4 / 1 / 416 / 368 / +48 / 9 / 1–1, 1.01; Qatar / 5 / 4 / 1 / 378 / 347 / +31 / 9 / 1–1, 0.95; Jordan / 5 / 2 / 3 / 364 / 353 / +11 / 7; Japan / 5 / 1 / 4 / 353 / 368 / −15 / 6; Hong Kong / 5 / 0 / 5 / 287 / 404 / −117 / 5	
Jordan	94–50	Quarterfinals	88–58	Kazakhstan
Chinese Taipei	79–60	Semifinals	86–79	South Korea

== Final ==
=== Philippines vs. Iran ===
11 August
19:30

Report

Philippines	71–85	Iran
Scoring by quarter: 15–17, 19–18, 19–27, 18–23
Pts: Castro 18; Rebs: Pingris 8 Asts: Alapag 3		Pts: Haddadi 29; Rebs: Haddadi 16; Asts: Nikkhah 7

Mall of Asia Arena, Pasay
Attendance: 19,989
Referees: Arsen Andryushkin (KAZ), Yuji Hirahara (JPN), Harja Jaladri (INA)

==== Box scores ====
Philippines
#	Player	Min	FG		3FG		FT		REB			AST	PF	TO	STL	BS	Pts
#	Player	Min	M/A	%	M/A	%	M/A	%	OFF	DEF	TOT	AST	PF	TO	STL	BS	Pts
4	Jimmy Alapag	20:38	4-8	50	3-6	50	2-2	100	0	0	0	3	1	1	0	0	13
5	LA Tenorio	19:09	3-8	38	2-6	33	0-0	0	0	3	3	3	3	1	1	0	8
6	Jeffrei Chan	15:38	2-6	33	1-5	20	2-2	100	1	1	2	0	2	1	0	0	7
7	Jayson William	27:55	5-13	38	1-2	50	7-9	78	0	1	1	3	0	3	0	0	18
8	Gary David	05:16	1-3	33	0-0	0	0-0	0	0	0	0	1	3	0	0	0	2
9	Ranidel De Ocampo	27:09	3-13	23	2-8	25	1-1	100	3	3	6	1	4	1	3	0	9
10	Gabe Norwood	27:32	0-4	0	0-2	0	3-4	75	1	2	3	2	3	1	3	0	3
11	Marcus Douthit	Did not play															
12	Larry Fonacier	11:26	1-4	25	1-3	33	0-0	0	0	1	1	1	1	0	0	0	3
13	June Mar Fajardo	08:17	0-2	0	0-0	0	1-2	50	3	1	4	0	2	1	0	0	1
14	Japeth Aguilar	16:58	2-7	29	0-2	0	0-1	0	1	3	4	0	4	0	1	0	4
15	Marc Pingris	19:56	1-1	100	0-0	0	1-2	50	3	5	8	0	3	1	2	0	3
Totals			22-69	32	10-34	29	17-23	74	12	20	32	14	26	10	10	0	71

Iran
#	Player	Min	FG		3FG		FT		REB			AST	PF	TO	STL	BS	Pts
#	Player	Min	M/A	%	M/A	%	M/A	%	OFF	DEF	TOT	AST	PF	TO	STL	BS	Pts
4	Mohammad Jamshidi	Did not play															
5	Aren Davoudi	21:46	1-3	33	0-2	0	0-0	0	0	2	2	3	1	1	0	0	2
6	Javad Davari	Did not play															
7	Mehdi Kamrani	35:09	5-13	38	2-6	33	3-4	75	3	4	7	5	3	3	1	0	15
8	Saman Veisi	Did not play															
9	Oshin Sahakian	28:40	3-7	43	0-3	0	6-6	100	1	11	12	2	4	1	0	0	12
10	Hamed Afagh	33:57	2-6	33	0-4	0	0-0	0	2	3	5	1	1	3	1	0	4
11	Hamed Sohrabnejad	10:01	1-2	50	0-0	0	0-0	0	0	4	4	0	2	1	0	0	2
12	Asghar Kardoust	08:36	1-1	100	0-0	0	0-0	0	0	2	2	0	1	0	0	0	2
13	Rouzbeh Arghavan	00:48	0-0	0	0-0	0	0-0	0	0	0	0	0	1	0	0	0	0
14	Samad Nikkhah Bahrami	31:54	5-14	36	1-2	50	8-9	89	1	2	3	7	4	6	0	0	19
15	Hamed Haddadi	29:06	12-15	80	0-0	0	5-7	71	6	10	16	2	4	3	0	2	29
Totals			30-61	49	3-17	18	22-26	85	13	38	51	20	21	18	2	2	85
