= 2013 FIBA Asia Championship =

International basketball tournament in the Philippines

Tournament details
- Host country: Philippines
- Dates: 1–11 August
- Teams: 15
- Venues: 2 (in 2 host cities)

Final positions
- Champions: Iran (3rd title)
- Runners-up: Philippines
- Third place: South Korea
- Fourth place: Chinese Taipei

Tournament statistics
- MVP: (Iran) Hamed Haddadi
- Top scorer: (Iran) Hamed Haddadi (18.8 points per game)

The 2013 FIBA Asia Championship for Men was the intercontinental championship for basketball organized by FIBA Asia that served as the qualifying tournament for the 2014 FIBA Basketball World Cup in Spain. The tournament was held from August 1–11 in Metro Manila, Philippines. Beirut, Lebanon was supposed to host the tournament but the hosting rights was given to the Philippines citing the Syrian Civil War and security concerns in the Middle East in general. This was also the last Asian Championships that served as the qualifying round for the FIBA Basketball World Cup, as a qualifying window was used starting 2019.

== Hosting ==
During the 2012 FIBA Asia Cup in Japan, FIBA Asia accepted the bids of the Philippines, Lebanon and Iran to host the 2013 FIBA Asia Championship. The Philippines' bid, which was presented by Samahang Basketbol ng Pilipinas (SBP; the national basketball federation) president Manuel V. Pangilinan, SBP secretary-general Sonny Barrios, Philippine Basketball Association commissioner Chito Salud and former FIBA Asia secretary general Moying Materlino, included hosting the games at the newly constructed Mall of Asia Arena. The Lebanese bid was presented by national team player Fadi El Khatib, which was a 10-minute video demonstration of the venues, of which Ghazir Club Court would be the primary arena. The FIBA Asia Executive Committee awarded the tournament to Lebanon, which shall be hosting its first championship.

Beirut was the host of the 2012 FIBA Asia Champions Cup, the Asian club championship. However, the final between Lebanese club Al-Riyadi and Mahram Tehran was put off due to political tension in the city. In a statement, FIBA Asia secretary general Hagop Khajirian said that "FIBA Asia will take a decision on holding the Final Game of the event very soon".

However, with the escalating Syrian civil war, FIBA Asia announced in January 2013 that they shall move the championship to the Philippines, after the SBP expressed willingly to still host the event. This would be the first time in 40 years that the Philippines hosted the championship.

== Qualification ==
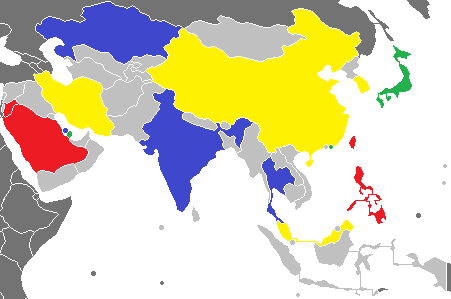
Teams that competed in the 2013 FIBA Asia Championship, grouped per preliminary round group,

According to the FIBA Asia rules, the host nation Philippines and 2012 FIBA Asia Cup champions Iran automatically qualified. East Asia, West Asia, Southeast Asia, and the Gulf each had two berths while Central Asia and South Asia each had one slot allotted. The other four places are allocated to the zones according to performance in the 2012 FIBA Asia Cup. Therefore, with Japan, Qatar, China, and Chinese Taipei finishing in the top four in that tournament other than Iran and Philippines which were both direct qualifiers, East Asia gained another three berths while the Gulf gained an additional slot.

Included are the teams' FIBA World Rankings prior to the tournament.

Event	Date	Location	Vacancies	Qualified
Host nation			1	Philippines (45)
2012 FIBA Asia Cup	14–22 September 2012	(Japan) Tokyo	1	Iran (20)
Central Asia qualifying	7 May 2013	(Kazakhstan) Astana	1	Kazakhstan (47)
East Asian Basketball Championship	16–21 May 2013	(South Korea) Incheon	5	South Korea (33); China (11); Japan (35); Hong Kong (71); Chinese Taipei (42)
Gulf Basketball Championship	30 September–6 October 2012	(Bahrain) Manama	3	Qatar (36); Bahrain (75); Saudi Arabia (69)
South Asian Qualifying Round	2–4 June 2013	(India) New Delhi	1	India (58)
Southeast Asia Basketball Championship	20–23 June 2013	(Indonesia) Medan	2	Thailand (85); Malaysia (69)
West Asia Basketball Championship	7–9 February 2013	(Iran) Tehran	2	~~Lebanon (25)~~*; Jordan (30)

Among teams that participated in 2011, Uzbekistan and Indonesia failed to qualify, and Syria did not participate. Returnees include Kazakhstan, which skipped the 2011 tournament after finishing ninth in 2009, Saudi Arabia, which failed to qualify in 2009 and last participated in 2005, Thailand, which last participated in 2001, and Hong Kong, which returned after failing to qualify in 2009 and 2011.

=== Suspension of the Lebanese federation ===
Lebanon originally qualified for the tournament after placing second in the 2013 West Asian Basketball Championship. However, after the country's basketball federation was suspended indefinitely by FIBA due to unresolved conflicts within the country's national basketball federation, they were replaced by fourth-placer Iraq, who declined due to lack of preparation time, and FIBA Asia instead invited the United Arab Emirates to replace them. After the United Arab Emirates declined the invitation for the same reason, and FIBA's confirmed the Lebanese federation's suspension, FIBA Asia decided not to invite any other team, reducing the total number of teams to 15. This left Group B with only three teams, and some games were moved from the Ninoy Aquino Stadium to compensate for the lost games involving Lebanon.

This meant all Group B teams thus automatically qualified for the second round, regardless of the outcome of their first round matches.

== Venues ==
The Mall of Asia Arena (MOA Arena) was chosen as the main venue for the championship, while the Ninoy Aquino Stadium served as the second venue for the tournament. Treston College Gym, the University of Makati Gym, the Makati Coliseum and the Cuneta Astrodome were the designated practice venues.

Pasay	Metro Manila
Mall of Asia Arena	2013 FIBA Asia Championship (Metro Manila)
Capacity: 20,000	2013 FIBA Asia Championship (Metro Manila)
Manila	2013 FIBA Asia Championship (Metro Manila)
Ninoy Aquino Stadium	2013 FIBA Asia Championship (Metro Manila)
Capacity: 6,000	2013 FIBA Asia Championship (Metro Manila)

== Draw ==
The draw was held at the Centennial Ballroom of the Manila Hotel on June 6. Unlike earlier championships where the draw favored stronger teams, FIBA Asia mandated that it will be a "pure draw", or the teams were not seeded, with the host country (the Philippines) picking 13th. At the time of the draw, two participants from the SEABA region were yet to be determined and were designated as "Southeast Asia 1" and "Southeast Asia 2". A separate draw would later be held to determine which teams would be designated as "Southeast Asia 1" and "Southeast Asia 2".

== Squads ==
Each team has a roster of twelve players. Only one naturalized player per team is allowed by FIBA.

== Tournament format ==
- Preliminary round: Three groups of four teams and a group of three teams. Teams from the same group play against each other once. Teams are ranked by points awarded in descending order. Top three advance to the second round.
  - Group tournament ranking system:
    - Games won: 2 points
    - Games lost by ordinary circumstances: 1 point
    - Games lost by default: 1 point, and the score at the time of stoppage if the defaulting team is trailing, or a score of 2–0 if it is leading or if the game is tied.
    - Games lost by forfeit: 0 points and a score of 20–0 against the forfeiting team.
  - Tiebreaking criteria:
    1. Game results between tied teams via points system above
    2. Goal average between games of the tied teams
    3. Goal average for all games of the tied teams
    4. Drawing of lots
- Second round: Groups A and B shall comprise Group E, while Groups C and D shall comprise Group F. Teams play against teams that have not played yet once, while the records for the teams that they had already met that also advanced are carried over. Same points and tiebreaking system as in the preliminary round. Top four advance to the final round.
- Final round: Single-elimination tournament for the championship
  - 3rd–4th classification: Playoff for semifinals losers
  - 5th–8th classification: Single-elimination tournament for quarterfinals losers
  - 9th–12th classification: Single-elimination tournament for fifth and sixth placers in the second round
  - 13th–15th classification: Single-elimination tournament for fourth placers in the preliminary round.

== Preliminary round ==
Qualified for the Second Round
Relegated to 13th–15th Classification

=== Group A ===
Team	Pld	W	L	PF	PA	PD	Pts
Chinese Taipei	3	3	0	265	233	+32	6
Philippines	3	2	1	234	221	+13	5
Jordan	3	1	2	221	215	+6	4
Saudi Arabia	3	0	3	180	231	−51	3

1 August 2013
Jordan	87–91	Chinese Taipei	Mall of Asia Arena, Pasay
Saudi Arabia	66–78	Philippines	Mall of Asia Arena, Pasay
2 August 2013
Chinese Taipei	90–67	Saudi Arabia	Mall of Asia Arena, Pasay
Jordan	71–77	Philippines	Mall of Asia Arena, Pasay
3 August 2013
Philippines	79–84	Chinese Taipei	Mall of Asia Arena, Pasay
Saudi Arabia	47–63	Jordan	Mall of Asia Arena, Pasay

=== Group B ===
Team	Pld	W	L	PF	PA	PD	Pts
Qatar	2	2	0	162	138	+24	4
Japan	2	1	1	150	134	+16	3
Hong Kong	2	0	2	123	163	−40	2

1 August 2013
Japan	74–75	Qatar	Mall of Asia Arena, Pasay
2 August 2013
Japan	76–59	Hong Kong	Mall of Asia Arena, Pasay
3 August 2013
Hong Kong	64–87	Qatar	Mall of Asia Arena, Pasay

=== Group C ===
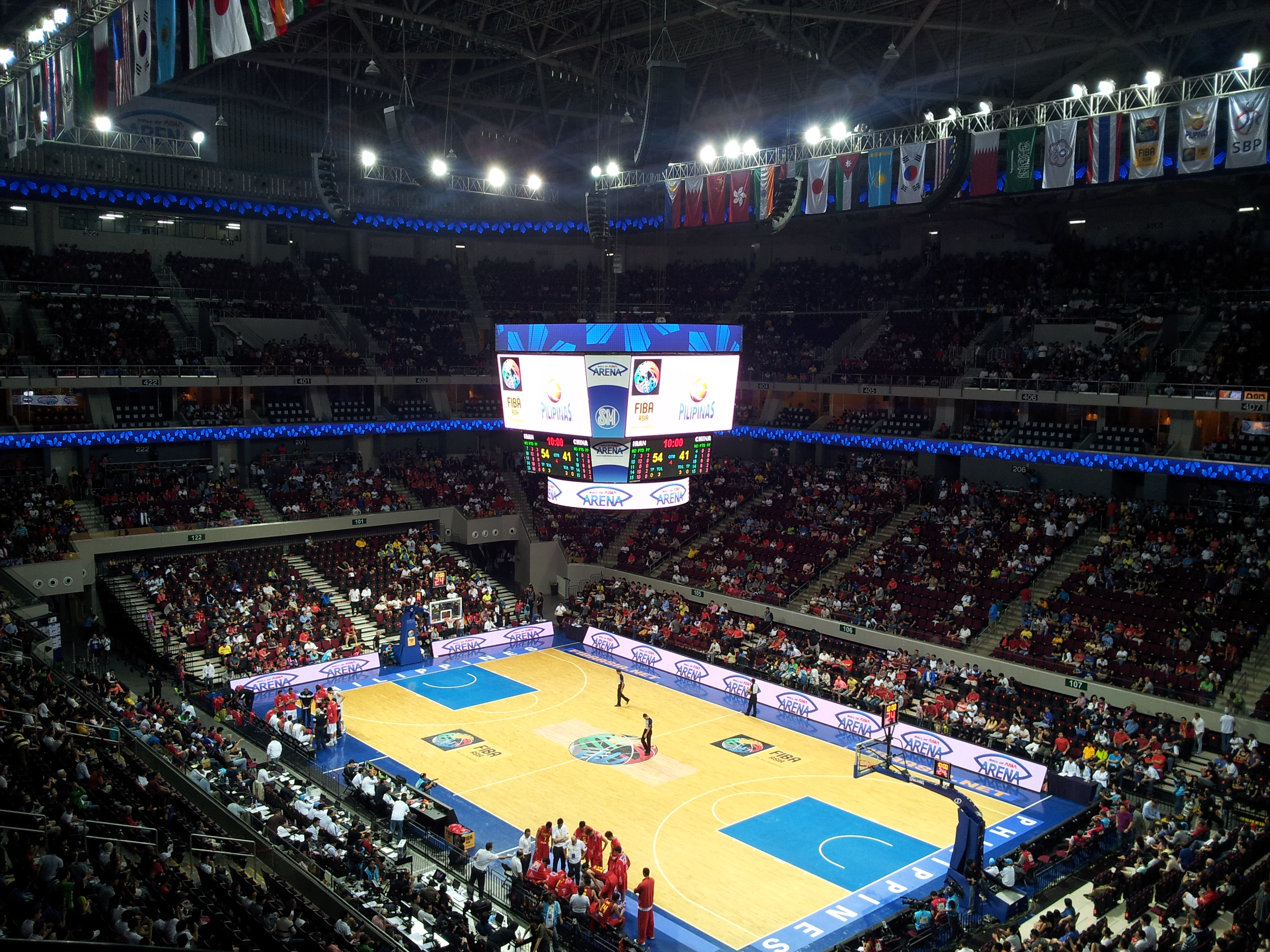
First-round game between Iran and China

Team	Pld	W	L	PF	PA	PD	Pts
Iran	3	3	0	261	141	+120	6
South Korea	3	2	1	208	193	+15	5
China	3	1	2	223	155	+68	4
Malaysia	3	0	3	105	308	−203	3

1 August 2013
Iran	115–25	Malaysia	Mall of Asia Arena, Pasay
China	59–63	South Korea	Mall of Asia Arena, Pasay
2 August 2013
China	113–22	Malaysia	Mall of Asia Arena, Pasay
South Korea	65–76	Iran	Mall of Asia Arena, Pasay
3 August 2013
Malaysia	58–80	South Korea	Mall of Asia Arena, Pasay
Iran	70–51	China	Mall of Asia Arena, Pasay

=== Group D ===
Team	Pld	W	L	PF	PA	PD	Pts
Kazakhstan	3	3	0	240	210	+30	6
Bahrain	3	2	1	244	221	+23	5
India	3	1	2	236	227	+9	4
Thailand	3	0	3	194	256	−62	3

1 August 2013
India	80–82	OT	Bahrain	Ninoy Aquino Stadium, Manila
Kazakhstan	81–67		Thailand	Mall of Asia Arena, Pasay
2 August 2013
Kazakhstan	79–76	OT	Bahrain	Ninoy Aquino Stadium, Manila
Thailand	65–89		India	Mall of Asia Arena, Pasay
3 August 2013
India	67–80		Kazakhstan	Mall of Asia Arena, Pasay
Bahrain	86–62		Thailand	Ninoy Aquino Stadium, Manila

== Classification 13th–15th ==
Semifinal; 5 August – Manila			13th place 6 August – Manila
			1	Saudi Arabia	93
2	Malaysia	56		Thailand	80
3	Thailand	71

== Second round ==
Qualified for the Final Round
Relegated to 9th–12th Classification

- The results and the points of the matches between the same teams that were already played during the preliminary round shall be taken into account for the second round.

=== Group E ===
Team	Pld	W	L	PF	PA	PD	Pts	Tie
Philippines	5	4	1	393	351	+42	9	1–1, 1.03
Chinese Taipei	5	4	1	416	368	+48	9	1–1, 1.01
Qatar	5	4	1	378	347	+31	9	1–1, 0.95
Jordan	5	2	3	364	353	+11	7	
Japan	5	1	4	353	368	−15	6	
Hong Kong	5	0	5	287	404	−117	5	

5 August 2013
Qatar	75–61	Jordan	Mall of Asia Arena, Pasay
Chinese Taipei	94–55	Hong Kong	Mall of Asia Arena, Pasay
Philippines	90–71	Japan	Mall of Asia Arena, Pasay
6 August 2013
Jordan	80–54	Hong Kong	Mall of Asia Arena, Pasay
Japan	76–79	Chinese Taipei	Mall of Asia Arena, Pasay
Philippines	80–70	Qatar	Mall of Asia Arena, Pasay
7 August 2013
Japan	56–65	Jordan	Mall of Asia Arena, Pasay
Chinese Taipei	68–71	Qatar	Mall of Asia Arena, Pasay
Hong Kong	55–67	Philippines	Mall of Asia Arena, Pasay

=== Group F ===
Team	Pld	W	L	PF	PA	PD	Pts
Iran	5	5	0	408	283	+125	10
South Korea	5	4	1	390	287	+103	9
China	5	3	2	350	311	+39	8
Kazakhstan	5	2	3	326	372	−46	7
Bahrain	5	1	4	331	418	−87	6
India	5	0	5	304	438	−134	5

5 August 2013
Iran	102–58	India	Mall of Asia Arena, Pasay
Kazakhstan	67–73	China	Mall of Asia Arena, Pasay
South Korea	96–51	Bahrain	Mall of Asia Arena, Pasay
6 August 2013
Bahrain	56–75	Iran	Mall of Asia Arena, Pasay
China	79–45	India	Mall of Asia Arena, Pasay
Kazakhstan	47–71	South Korea	Mall of Asia Arena, Pasay
7 August 2013
Iran	85–53	Kazakhstan	Mall of Asia Arena, Pasay
Bahrain	66–88	China	Mall of Asia Arena, Pasay
India	54–95	South Korea	Mall of Asia Arena, Pasay

== Classification 9th–12th ==
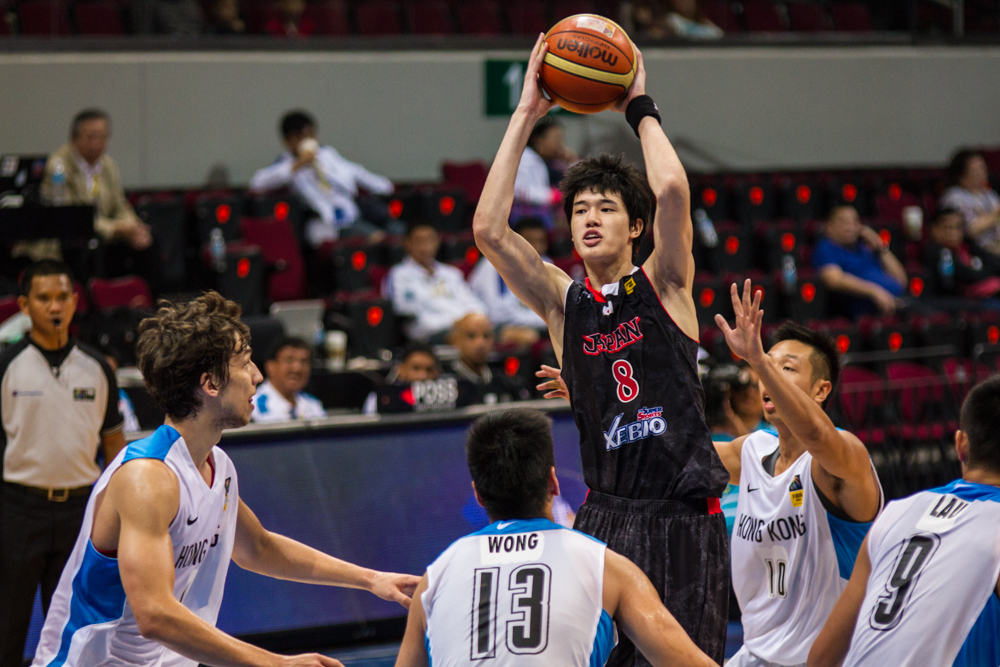
Classification match between Japan and Hong Kong

Semifinals
9 August
Japan	73
India	64
9 August
Bahrain	79
Hong Kong	87

9th place
10 August
Japan	79
Hong Kong	50
11th place
10 August
India	75
Bahrain	65

== Final round ==
Quarterfinals
9 August – Pasay
Philippines	88
Kazakhstan	58
9 August – Pasay
South Korea	79
Qatar	52
9 August – Pasay
Iran	94
Jordan	50
9 August – Pasay
Chinese Taipei	96
China	78

Semifinals
10 August – Pasay
Philippines	86
South Korea	79
10 August – Pasay
Iran	79
Chinese Taipei	60

Final
11 August – Pasay
Philippines	71
Iran	85
3rd place
11 August – Pasay
South Korea	75
Chinese Taipei	57

Semifinals
10 August – Pasay
Kazakhstan	67
Qatar	72
10 August – Pasay
Jordan	76
China	79

5th place
11 August – Pasay
Qatar	85
China	96
7th place
11 August – Pasay
Kazakhstan	59
Jordan	88

=== Quarterfinals ===
9 August
15:00

Report

Iran	94–50	Jordan
Scoring by quarter: 31–11, 22–17, 21–8, 20–14
Pts: Haddadi 20; Rebs: Sahakian 9 Asts: Kamrani 11		Pts: Baxter 13; Rebs: Hadrab 8 Asts: Baxter 4

Mall of Asia Arena, Pasay
Referees: Yuji Hirahara (JPN), Hatim Hamed Alharbi (KSA), Cheung Kwok Shun Andy (HKG)

9 August
17:45

Report

Chinese Taipei	96–78	China
Scoring by quarter: 20–28, 20–22, 31–12, 25–16
Pts: Davis 26; Rebs: Davis 10; Asts: Lin C.C. 7		Pts: Yi 22; Rebs: Yi 10; Asts: Guo 7

Mall of Asia Arena, Pasay
Referees: Yevgeniy Mikheyev (KAZ), Atanu Banerjee (IND), Abdulkarim Shakeeb (BHR)

9 August
20:30

Report

Philippines	88–58	Kazakhstan
Scoring by quarter: 32–15, 19–25, 16–9, 21–9
Pts: David 22; Rebs: Douthit 10; Asts: Tenorio, Castro, Fonacier 4		Pts: Klimov 14; Rebs: Ponomarev 12; Asts: Johnson, Yargaliyev, Klimov 3

Mall of Asia Arena, Pasay
Referees: Mohammad Alamiri (KUW), Snehal Bendke (IND), Tan Chin Siong (MAS)

9 August
22:30

Report

South Korea	79–52	Qatar
Scoring by quarter: 24–14, 16–14, 21–14, 18–10
Pts: Cho 16; Rebs: Kim M.G. 7 Asts: Kim M.G., Kim T.S. 4		Pts: Hayes, Saeed 10; Rebs: Hayes 6 Asts: D. Musa 4

Mall of Asia Arena, Pasay
Referees: Harja Jaladri (INA), Toru Katayose (JPN), Amirhossein Safarzadeh (IRN)

=== 5th–8th place semifinals ===
10 August
15:00

Report

China	79–76	Jordan
Scoring by quarter: 18–12, 14–15, 23–25, 24–24
Pts: Wang Z.Z. 33; Rebs: Wang Z.Z. 7 Asts: Sun 6		Pts: Al-Sous 17; Rebs: Hadrab 8 Asts: Baxter 8

Mall of Asia Arena, Pasay
Referees: Toru Katayose (JPN), Ricor Buaron (PHI), Tan Chin Siong (MAS)

10 August
22:30

Report

Kazakhstan	67–72	Qatar
Scoring by quarter: 15–20, 17–19, 13–19, 22–14
Pts: Yevstigneyev 24; Rebs: Yevstigneyev 13; Asts: Johnson 4		Pts: Y. Musa 18; Rebs: El Hadary 6 Asts: D. Musa 3

Mall of Asia Arena, Pasay
Referees: Ferdinand Pascual (PHI), Chong Yun Aun (MAS), Yuri Hirahara (JPN)

=== Semifinals ===
10 August
17:45

Report

Iran	79–60	Chinese Taipei
Scoring by quarter: 14–23, 27–12, 19–4, 19–21
Pts: Kamrani 19; Rebs: Haddadi 14; Asts: Kamrani 6		Pts: Davis 16; Rebs: Davis, Tien 5 Asts: Tseng, Tsai 3

Mall of Asia Arena, Pasay
Referees: Arsen Andryushkin (KAZ), Jassim Abdullah (QAT), Harja Jaladri (INA)

10 August
20:30

Report

Philippines	86–79	South Korea
Scoring by quarter: 15–19, 21–20, 29–17, 21–23
Pts: Castro 17; Rebs: Pingris 10; Asts: de Ocampo, Castro 4		Pts: Kim M.G. 27; Rebs: Kim J.S., Kim T.S. 5 Asts: Yang D.G. 7

Mall of Asia Arena, Pasay
Referees: Mohammad Al Amiri (KUW), Yevgeniy Mikheyev (KAZ), Wang Mei (CHN)

=== Seventh place game ===
11 August
12:30

Report

Jordan	88–59	Kazakhstan
Scoring by quarter: 30–18, 25–14, 18–12, 15–15
Pts: Abdeen 20; Rebs: Al-Najjar 7 Asts: Al-Najjar, Baxter 8		Pts: Yargaliyev 17; Rebs: Yevstigneyev 9 Asts: Johnson 3

Mall of Asia Arena, Pasay
Referees: Atanu Banerjee (IND), Wang Mei (CHN), Andy Cheung Kwok Shun (HKG)

=== Fifth place game ===
11 August
14:45

Report

Qatar	85–96	China
Scoring by quarter: 21–20, 19–25, 15–25, 30–26
Pts: El Hadary 23; Rebs: Abdulla 10; Asts: El Hadary 5		Pts: Guo 21; Rebs: Wang Z.Z. 11; Asts: Guo 5

Mall of Asia Arena, Pasay
Referees: Toru Katayose (JPN), Yevgeniy Mikheyev (KAZ), Amirhossein Safarzadeh (IRI)

=== Third place game ===
11 August
17:00

Report

Chinese Taipei	57–75	South Korea
Scoring by quarter: 13–29, 16–21, 15–11, 13–14
Pts: Lu 13; Rebs: Lin C.C. 4 Asts: Davis 8		Pts: Kim M.G. 21; Rebs: Kim J.S., Yun 8 Asts: Yang D.G 8

Mall of Asia Arena, Pasay
Referees: Ferdinand Pascual (PHI), Mohammad Alamiri (KUW), Hatim Hamed Alharbi (KSA)

=== Final ===
11 August
19:30

Report

Philippines	71–85	Iran
Scoring by quarter: 15–17, 19–18, 19–27, 18–23
Pts: Castro 18; Rebs: Pingris 8 Asts: Alapag 3		Pts: Haddadi 29; Rebs: Haddadi 16; Asts: Nikkhah 7

Mall of Asia Arena, Pasay
Attendance: 19,989
Referees: Arsen Andryushkin (KAZ), Yuji Hirahara (JPN), Harja Jaladri (INA)

== Final standings ==
Qualified for the 2014 FIBA Basketball World Cup

Rank	Team	Record	FIBA World Rankings		
Rank	Team	Record	Before	After	Change
1st place, gold medalist(s)	Iran	9–0	20	20	0
2nd place, silver medalist(s)	Philippines	7–2	45	34	+11
3rd place, bronze medalist(s)	South Korea	7–2	33	31	+2
4th	Chinese Taipei	6–3	42	44	−2
5th	China	6–3	11	12	−1
6th	Qatar	5–3	36	42	−6
7th	Jordan	4–5	30	30	0
8th	Kazakhstan	3–6	47	52	−5
9th	Japan	3–4	35	35	0
10th	Hong Kong	1–6	71	69	+2
11th	India	2–6	58	61	−3
12th	Bahrain	2–6	75	73	+2
13th	Saudi Arabia	1–3	69	76	−7
14th	Thailand	1–4	85	79	+6
15th	Malaysia	0–4	69	71	−2

== Awards ==
2013 Asian champions

Iran
Third title

- Most Valuable Player: (Iran) Hamed Haddadi
- All-Star Team:
  - PG – (Philippines) Jayson Castro
  - SG – (South Korea) Kim Min-goo
  - SF – (Chinese Taipei) Lin Chih-chieh
  - PF – (Iran) Oshin Sahakian
  - C – (Iran) Hamed Haddadi

== Statistical leaders ==
=== Player tournament averages ===
Points

Pos.	Name	PPG
1	(Iran) Hamed Haddadi	18.8
2	(China) Yi Jianlian	17.4
3	(Qatar) Jarvis Hayes	16.7
4	(Saudi Arabia) Aymam Almuwallad	15.3
5	(Chinese Taipei) Quincy Davis	14.7
6	(Jordan) Jimmy Baxter	14.1
7	(China) Wang Zhizhi	13.4
8	(India) Visresh Bhriguvanshi	13.1
9	(Kazakhstan) Mikhail Yevtigneyev	12.9
10	(Iran) Samad Nikkhah Bahrami	12.8

Rebounds

Pos.	Name	RPG
1	(Iran) Hamed Haddadi	10
1	(Saudi Arabia) Mohammed Almarwani	10
3	(Philippines) Marcus Douthit	9.4
3	(Japan) J.R. Sakuragi	9.4
5	(Chinese Taipei) Quincy Davis	9
6	(Qatar) Yasseen Musa	8.9
7	(Hong Kong) Fong Shing Yee	8.7
8	(Hong Kong) Duncan Reid	8.4
9	(Kazakhstan) Anton Ponomarev	7.8
10	(Japan) Kosuke Takeuchi	7.4

Assists

Pos.	Name	APG
1	(Iran) Mehdi Kamrani	6.6
2	(Kazakhstan) Jerry Johnson	5
3	(Chinese Taipei) Lin Chih-chieh	4.9
4	(South Korea) Yang Dong-geun	4.4
5	(Saudi Arabia) Marzouq Almuwallad	4.3
6	(Iran) Samad Nikkhah Bahrami	4.2
7	(Jordan) Jimmy Baxter	3.9
8	(Qatar) Daoud Mosa Daoud	3.6
9	(India) Visresh Bhriguvanshi	3.5
10	(Japan) Ryota Sakurai	3.4

Steals

Pos.	Name	SPG
1	(Iran) Mehdi Kamrani	1.56
2	(Iran) Hamed Afagh	1.33
2	(Iran) Samad Nikkhah Bahrami	1.33
4	(Japan) Makoto Hiejima	1.29
5	(Thailand) Wattana Suttisin	1.33
6	(Thailand) Attaporn Lertmalaiporn	1.2
7	(South Korea) Kim Tae-sul	1
7	(Saudi Arabia) Mazrouq Almuwallad	1
7	(Saudi Arabia) Jamer Kabe	1
7	(Malaysia) Sing Tee Ng	1

Blocks

Pos.	Name	BPG
1	(Philippines) Marcus Douthit	2
2	(Iran) Hamed Haddadi	1.67
2	(South Korea) Lee Jong-hyun	1.67
4	(Bahrain) Ahmed Akber	1.63
5	(India) Amjyot Singh	1.38
6	(Japan) Kosuke Takeuchi	1.29
7	(Chinese Taipei) Quincy Davis	1.22
8	(Thailand) Darunong Apiromvilaichai	1.2
9	(Philippines) Gabe Norwood	1
9	(Jordan) Mohammad Hadrab	1
9	(Qatar) Erfan Ali Saeed	1

Other statistical leaders

Stat	Name	Avg.
Field goal percentage	(Chinese Taipei) Quincy Davis	73.7%
3-point FG percentage	(Malaysia) Gan Hong Hoong	61.5%
Free throw percentage	(Jordan) Mohammad Hadrab	91.3%
Turnovers	(Malaysia) Ban Sin Ooi	6
Fouls	(Saudi Arabia) Mohammed Almarwani (Malaysia) Kuek Tian-yuan	4

=== Team tournament averages ===
Points

Pos.	Name	PPG
1	Iran	86.8
2	Chinese Taipei	79.9
3	Philippines	79.6
3	China	79.6
5	South Korea	78.1

Rebounds

Pos.	Name	RPG
1	Iran	44.6
2	Qatar	42.2
3	Philippines	41.2
4	Jordan	40.7
5	India	40.1

Assists

Pos.	Name	APG
1	Iran	20.9
2	South Korea	20.7
3	Chinese Taipei	18.2
4	China	16.4
5	Philippines	15.7

Steals

Pos.	Name	SPG
1	Iran	6.2
2	South Korea	5.9
3	Thailand	5.6
4	Chinese Taipei	5.3
5	Philippines	4.3
5	Jordan	4.3

Blocks

Pos.	Name	BPG
1	Philippines	4.9
1	South Korea	4.9
3	Bahrain	3.6
4	India	3.2
5	Jordan	3

|}

=== Tournament game highs ===
Category	Player game high	Total	Opponent (date)	Team game high	Total	Opponent (date)
Points	(China) Wang Zhizhi	33	Jordan (August 10)	Iran	115	Malaysia (August 1)
Rebounds	(Jordan) Mohammad Hussein (Qatar) Yasseen Musa (Hong Kong) Duncan Reid	19	Japan (August 7); Chinese Taipei (August 7); Philippines (August 7)	India	60	Thailand (August 2)
Assists	(Chinese Taipei) Lin Chih-chieh	12	Philippines (August 3)	Iran	31	Malaysia (August 1)
Steals	(Iran) Hamed Afagh (China) Guo Ailun (South Korea) Kim Tae-sul (Kazakhstan) Dmitriy Klimov	4	Chinese Taipei (August 10); Malaysia (August 2); Bahrain (August 5); Iran (August 7)	South Korea	12	Bahrain (August 5)
Blocks	(Bahrain) Ahmed Akber	5	India (August 10)	South Korea	10	India (August 7)

== Marketing ==
=== Broadcasting ===
FIBA announced that Chinese state broadcaster China Central Television (CCTV) earned the rights to broadcast FIBA events in China from 2013 to 2016, and that a record number of Asian broadcasters are to telecast the event. At least some matches were broadcast in 40 countries and territories all over the world.

These are the broadcasters from the participating teams:

Country	Broadcaster
Bahrain	Al Jazeera Sports +1
China	CCTV-5
Hong Kong	i-Cable Sports
India	Neo Sports
Iran	Channel 3
Japan	Fuji TV
Jordan	Al Jazeera Sports +1
Malaysia	Astro
Philippines	AksyonTV; Basketball TV; Hyper; TV5
Qatar	Al Jazeera Sports +1
Saudi Arabia	Al Jazeera Sports +1
South Korea	SBS ESPN
Chinese Taipei	Fox Sports Asia
Thailand	CTH

In the Philippines, Solar Entertainment Corporation's Basketball TV is the official home broadcaster airing all matches from the Mall of Asia Arena. Solar has the rights to all FIBA telecasts in the Philippines until 2015. For free TV, ABC Development Corporation's flagship network, TV5, aired games involving the Philippines and the immediately preceding match, while AksyonTV aired the afternoon matches. BTV aired all games of the knockout round, while TV5 aired two quarterfinal games, the semifinals, third-place playoff and final, and AksyonTV aired a quarterfinal.

The TV5 airings of Philippines games were consistently among the top ten telecasts of the night throughout the tournament, and even beat shows from ABS-CBN and GMA in Mega Manila. According to Nielsen Media Research, TV5's Mega Manila audience share on 10 August was 33.1%, as against GMA's 30.1% and ABS-CBN's 24.3%; numbers for 11 August improved, with TV's 38.1% beating GMA's 31.5% and ABS-CBN's 18.3%. National audience share showed TV5 winning with a 35.3% share, or about 5.7 million people, against 28.1% of GMA and 25% of ABS-CBN.

Date	Game	AGB Nielsen Mega Manila		TNS national	
Date	Game	Rating	Rank	Rating	Rank
1 August	Philippines vs. Saudi Arabia	11.1%	—	6.1%	—
2 August	Philippines vs. Jordan	12.1%	—	8.2%	—
3 August	China vs. Iran	6.8%	—	—N/a	
3 August	Philippines vs. Chinese Taipei	16%	7th	5%	—
5 August	Philippines vs. Japan	—N/a		9.8%	—
6 August	Philippines vs. Qatar	17.6%	10th	12%	10th
7 August	Philippines vs. Hong Kong	17.2%	10th	11.5%	10th
9 August	Philippines vs. Kazakhstan	19.8%	7th	12.7%	10th
10 August	Chinese Taipei vs. Iran	8.6%	—	5.6%	—
10 August	Philippines vs. Korea	22.9%	3rd	14.5%	8th
10 August	Kazakhstan vs. Qatar	3.5%	—	1.8%	—
11 August	Chinese Taipei vs. Korea	8.8%	—	8.8%	—
11 August	Philippines vs. Iran	28%	2nd	18.5%	7th

=== Soundtrack ===
There were 2 main soundtracks made for the Asian Championship, which was heard over in Philippine TV Broadcast.

- Saludo by Quest
- Gilas Anthem/Puso by JR Ponce Enrile

== Officials ==
=== Match commissioners ===
- (Philippines) Riel Banaria
- (Bahrain) Jaafar Ali Ghuloom
- (Hong Kong) Ip Fuk-Wah
- (China) Xin Ping

=== Referees ===
- (Bahrain) Abdulkarim Shakeeb
- (China) Peng Ling
- (China) Wang Xiao Chun
- (China) Wang Mei
- (Hong Kong) Cheung Kwok Shun Andy
- (Chinese Taipei) Chen Ying-Cheng
- (India) Atanu Banerjee
- (India) Snehal Bendke
- (Iran) Amirhossein Safarzadeh
- (Japan) Yuri Hirahara
- (Japan) Toru Katayose
- (Jordan) Mohd Naser Abu Rashed
- (Kazakhstan) Arsen Andryushkin
- (Kazakhstan) Yevgeniy Mikheyev
- (South Korea) Shin Gi-rok
- (Malaysia) Chong Yun Aun
- (Malaysia) Tan Chin Siong
- (Philippines) Ferdinand Pascual
- (Philippines) Ricor Buaron
- (Philippines) Glenn Cornelio
- (Qatar) Jassim Abdullah
- (Qatar) Yasser Abbas
- (Saudi Arabia) Hatim Alharbi
- (Thailand) Thongchai Thaweewutsophon
- (Indonesia) Harja Jaladri
- (Kuwait) Mohd Al-Amiri

== Sponsorship ==
- Bodog Asia
- Peak
- Smart Communications
