= Jimmy Baxter (basketball) =

American-Jordanian basketball player

Personal information
- Born: November 30, 1980 (age 45) St. Petersburg, Florida
- Listed height: 6 ft 7 in (2.01 m)
- Listed weight: 207 lb (94 kg)

Career information
- High school: Boca Ciega (Gulfport, Florida)
- College: South Florida (2000–2004)
- NBA draft: 2004: undrafted
- Playing career: 2005–2016
- Position: Shooting guard / small forward
- Number: 22

Career history
- 2005: Oliveirense Simoldes (Portugal)
- 2005–2006: JDA Dijon (France)
- 2006–2007: Edimes Pavia (Italy)
- 2007: Bipop-Carire Reggio Emilia (Italy)
- 2007–2008: Ventspils (Latvia)
- 2008: Base Oostende (Belgium)
- 2008–2009: Beşiktaş ColaTurka (Turkey)
- 2009–2010: Ironi Ashkelon (Israel)
- 2010–2011: Ilisiakos (Greece)
- 2011: Petrochimi Bandar Imam (Iran)
- 2011: Krka Novo mesto (Slovenia)
- 2012: Ikaros Kallitheas (Greece)
- 2012: Gießen 46ers (Germany)
- 2012–2013: Quimsa (Argentina)
- 2013: Guaiqueríes de Margarita (Venezuela)
- 2013–2014: Quimsa (Argentina)
- 2014–2015: São José Basketball (Brazil)
- 2015–2016: Peñarol de Mar del Plata (Argentina)
- 2016: Toros de Aragua (Venezuela)
- 2016: Club Deportivo Valdivia (Chile)

Career highlights
- LNB All-star (2006); LBL All-star (2008); HEBA A1 All-star (2011); NCAA Award of Valor (2004); Greek1 All- star (2012) Turkey1 All -star(2009)

Jimmy Baxter (born November 30, 1980) is an American-Jordanian professional basketball player who previously played for Ilisiakos B.C. in Greece and played for various other teams since then.

In 2004, Baxter, then a member of the USF Bulls men's basketball team, was awarded the NCAA Award of Valor for saving two men trapped in a vehicle after a violent crash. He also received a key to the City of Tampa for his efforts.

On January 20, 2016, Baxter signed with Toros de Aragua of the Venezuelan League.
