= Philippine government response to the COVID-19 pandemic =

Both the national government and local governments responded to the COVID-19 pandemic in the Philippines with various declarations of emergency, closure of schools and public meeting places, lockdowns, and other restrictions intended to slow the spread of the virus.

== National responses and regulations ==
President Rodrigo Duterte's Public Address on the COVID-19 pandemic on March 12.

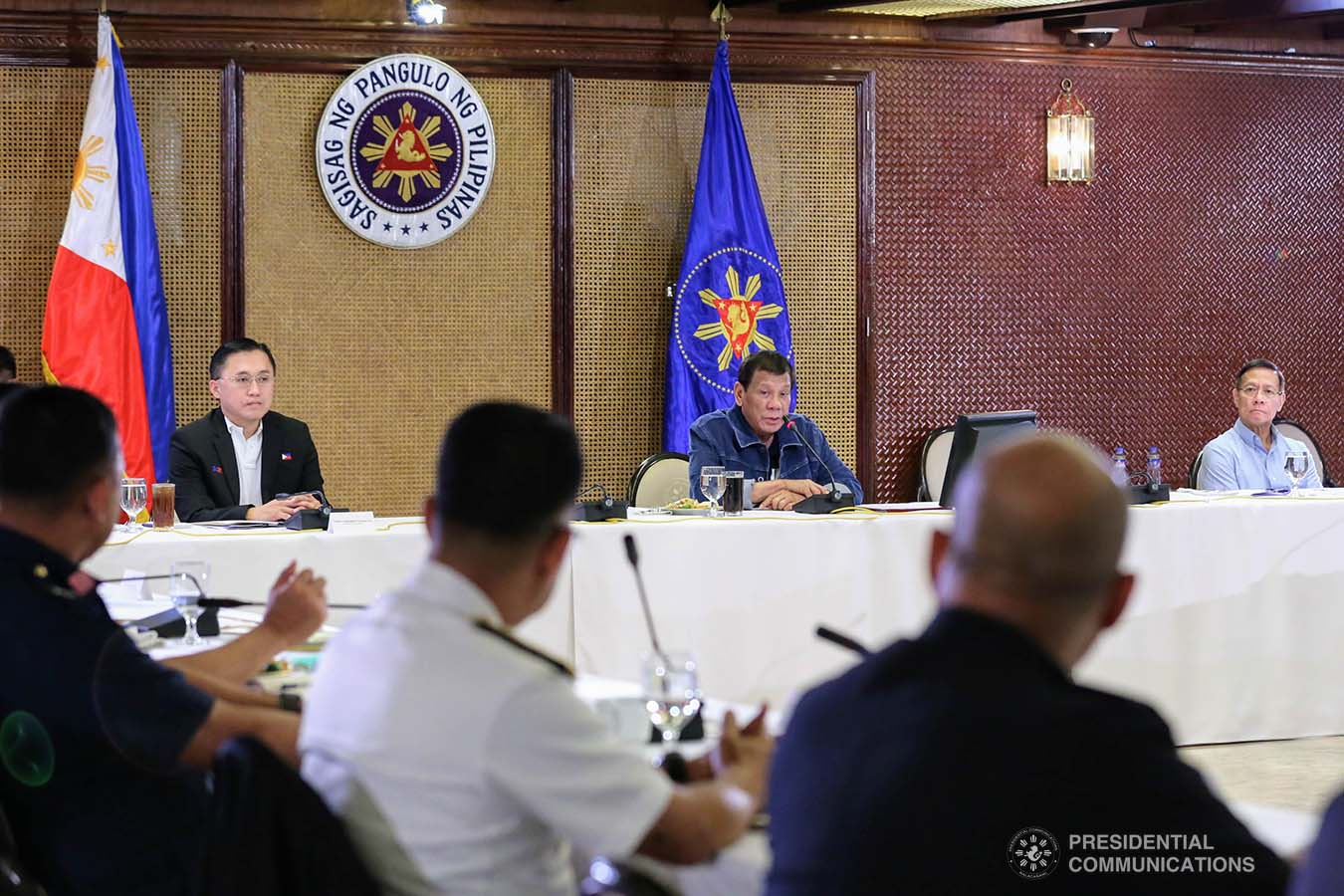
President Rodrigo Duterte presides over a meeting with the Inter-Agency Task Force for the Management of Emerging Infectious Diseases at Malacañang Palace in March 2020

=== Measures ===
Following the confirmation of the first localized transmission on March 7, 2020, the DOH raised its alert to Code Red Sub-Level 1. President Rodrigo Duterte later issued Proclamation No. 922 on March 9, formally declaring a state of public health emergency in the country, authorizing local government units to employ their local disaster risk reduction management funds.

The Department of Trade and Industry (DTI) on March 9 issued a directive ordering retailers to only allow the sale of two bottles of each type of disinfectant per person as a measure against hoarding. In line with the public health emergency declaration, the department imposed a 60-day price freeze on basic commodities.

On March 16, the president signed Proclamation No. 929 declaring a state of calamity throughout the country for six months, bringing into effect the following:

- price control of basic needs and commodities,
- granting interest-free loans,
- distribution of calamity funds,
- authorization of importation and receipt of donations, and
- hazard allowance for public health workers and government personnel in the fields of science and technology.

President Duterte signed administrative orders providing daily hazard pay and additional special risk allowance to front line government officials and employees including health workers. The office of Vice President Leni Robredo for its part raised funding for personal protective equipment.

The Department of Labor and Employment and the Department of Social Welfare and Development started their own emergency cash subsidy programs.

=== Bayanihan to Heal as One Act ===
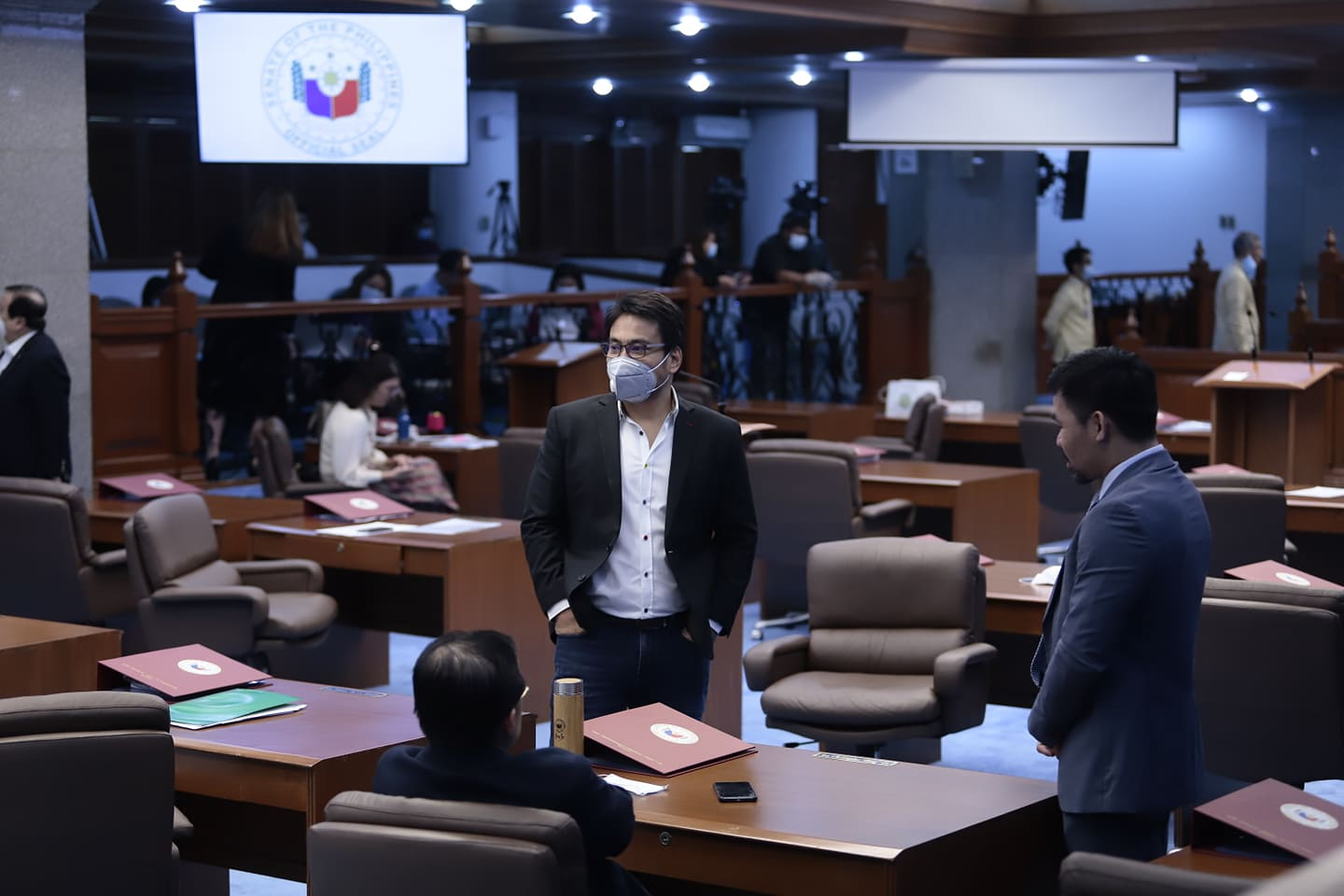
Senators during a special session to tackle the passage of the Bayanihan to Heal as One Act on March 23.

Following the sharp increase of confirmed COVID-19 cases, President Duterte called on Congress to hold special sessions on March 23 to enact the Bayanihan to Heal as One Act, which would "authorize the President to exercise powers necessary to carry out urgent measures to meet the current national emergency related to COVID-19 only for three months unless extended by Congress." The act would allow Duterte to "reallocate, realign, and reprogram" a budget of almost ₱275 billion(~US$5.37 billion) from the estimated ₱438 billion(~US$8.55 billion) national budget approved for 2020, in response to the pandemic; enable him to "temporarily take over or direct the operations" of public utilities and privately owned health facilities and other necessary facilities "when the public interest so requires" for quarantine, the accommodation of health professionals, and the distribution and storage of medical relief; and "facilitate and streamline" the accreditation of testing kits.

In the House of Representatives of the Philippines, the bill was introduced as House Bill No. 6616 with House Speaker Alan Peter Cayetano of Pateros–Taguig as its principal sponsor and was defended on the floor by Deputy Speaker Luis Raymund Villafuerte of Camarines Sur's 2nd district. Executive Secretary Salvador Medialdea addressed the session, stressing that the president needed "standby powers" to address the emergency. Some representatives questioned the nature, usage, and necessity of the "standby powers", claiming its susceptibility to abuse and corruption.

In the Senate of the Philippines, the bill was introduced as Senate Bill No. 1418 with Senate President Tito Sotto and Senator Pia Cayetano as its principal sponsors. Under the bill, Cayetano said that over 18 million Filipino households living below the poverty line would also receive financial incentives of around ₱5,000–8,000 (~US$97.45–155.92) per month for two months. Senators amended their version of the bill to include financial compensation of around ₱100,000 ($1,965.33) to be given by PhilHealth to health professionals who contracted the virus, as well as the provision of around ₱1 million-worth (~US$19,653.27) of financial aid to their families.

Both versions of the bill reportedly removed the usage of the term "emergency powers", replacing it with "authority". It also removed the term "take over of public utilities and private businesses", limiting President Duterte's abilities at most to "direct the operations" of such enterprises. The House version of the bill passed the House of Representatives in a 284–9 vote without abstentions, while its Senate version unanimously passed the Senate. Duterte signed the bill into law the following day.

=== Lockdowns ===
On March 12, 2020, President Duterte announced a partial lockdown covering the entirety of Metro Manila that was later put into place on March 15. The lockdown was further expanded on March 16, when President Duterte imposed an enhanced community quarantine (ECQ) throughout the entire island of Luzon and its associated islands. This was effectively a total lockdown, which had restricted travel and transportation, imposed strict home quarantine among all households, and closed all non-essential private establishments within the island group. This ECQ was extended and reimposed multiple times during the pandemic. Similarly, local governments outside Luzon and Metro Manila have imposed various measures to limit the spread of the virus in their communities. By mid-2020, most of the Philippines were placed in a more relaxed and centralized general community quarantine (GCQ), although certain parts of the country remained with stricter measures. Several clusters of the disease have led to localized lockdowns.

=== Cash aid ===
==== Social amelioration program ====
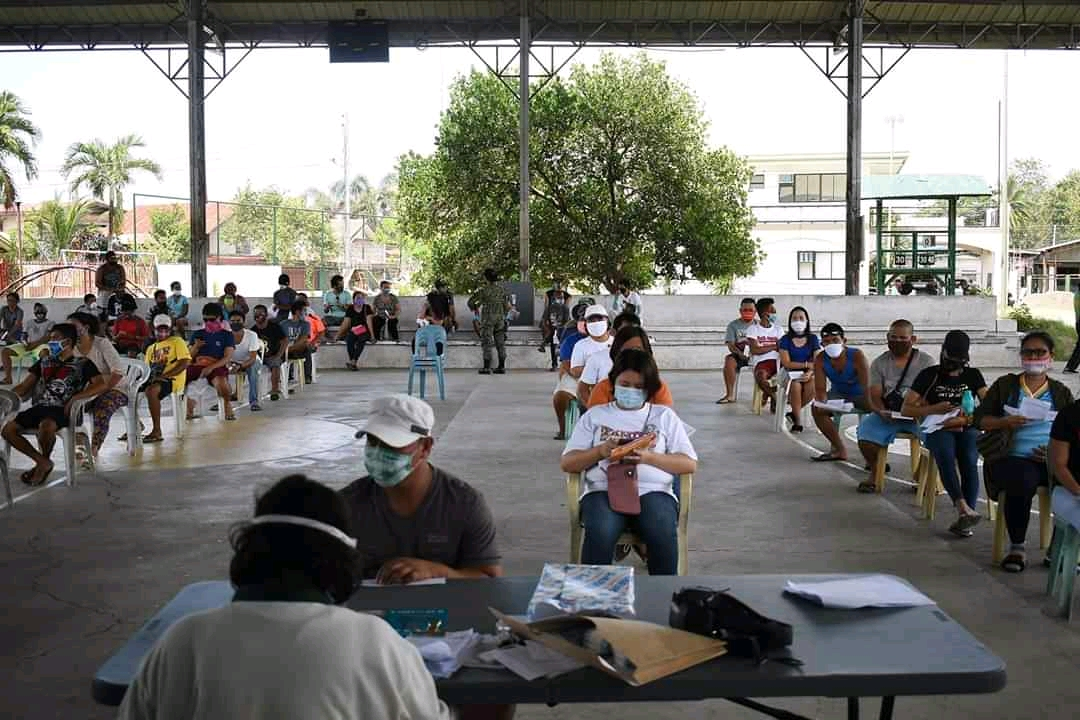
SAP grant beneficiaries in San Carlos, Negros Occidental waiting for the pay out of their grants

The Department of Social Welfare and Development (DSWD) is the agency responsible for the implementation of the national government's social amelioration program (SAP), an emergency cash subsidy meant for indigent families affected by the COVID-19 pandemic and relevant quarantine measures. As of April 14, 2020, around ₱57.8 billion have been released by the social welfare department to the country's 103 local government units (LGUs). The agency targets to make 18 million low-income households as beneficiaries of the program. Households with a family income of less than ₱10 thousand monthly income were given priority. The DSWD has devolved the distribution of the cash subsidy to the LGUS though the agency continues to provide support to the LGUs' efforts including "on-the-spot" validation of beneficiaries.

By May 17, the DSWD had reached 95 percent of its target, providing aid to 17.1 million beneficiary households with ₱96.7 billion worth of cash subsidy distributed.

The DSWD issued multiple warnings regarding misinformation on the cash aid program coming from unsanctioned Facebook pages.

For the second tranche of the SAP, the administration of President Rodrigo Duterte changed the responsibility of distributing cash aid from the local government units to the military and police amid complaints of slow delivery and misuse of funds meant for certain areas.

==== Universal healthcare ====
The Philippine Health Insurance Corporation (PhilHealth) announced that it would provide ₱30-billion ($581-million) worth of advance payment to its accredited health facilities for health care providers to obtain the liquid capital required to efficiently respond to the crisis. PhilHealth also subsided some of its policies on its members; it waived the 45-day coverage and single period of confinement policies while extending payment deadlines until the end of April and the failing period of claims from 60 days to at least 120 days. Also, PhilHealth announced that PUIs quarantined in its accredited facilities are entitled to a ₱14,000 ($270) health package, while those who tested positive for COVID-19 are entitled to a ₱32,000 ($580) beneficiary package.

==== Frontline workers compensation ====
On March 23, President Duterte signed Administrative Order No. 26, granting that front line government officials and employees receive a daily hazard pay of ₱500 ($9.87). On April 6, President Duterte signed Administrative Order No. 28, granting the payment of a special risk allowance to public health workers in addition to their hazard pay. According to the order, public health workers attending to COVID-19 patients, PUMs, and PUIs will receive at most a quarter of their basic pay.

==== Other measures ====
The Presidential Security Group (PSG) have implemented a "no-touch" policy during meetings by President Duterte with politicians, reporters, and visitors. Several government officials announced that they would donate portions of their salaries to help fund government initiatives responding to the pandemic. President Duterte said that he would donate a month of his salary, which amounts to ₱400,000, to the Office of Civil Defense. Some senators and around 200 members of the House of Representatives would also donate their salaries for May, while most Cabinet members would donate at most 75 percent of their salaries.

The Department of Labor and Employment (DOLE) announced it would initiate a cash assistance program worth ₱2 billion ($39 million) for workers in both the formal and informal sectors across the country affected by government-imposed quarantines. As of March 31, the department reported that at least 25,428 formal sectors and 5,220 informal sector workers were given cash assistance of ₱5,000 ($98) each.

=== Medical supply ===
The office of Vice President Leni Robredo raised about ₱28.8 million ($564,551) to purchase 64,367 sets of PPE and donate it to front line health professionals across the country. The first batch consisted of 7,350 PPEs that were donated to 490 professionals in eight hospitals in Manila and Quezon City with COVID-19 cases. By March 24, Robredo's office had delivered 23,475 sets of PPE to 62 medical facilities and communities across Metro Manila, La Union, and Quezon. Robredo also partnered with fashion designer Mich Dulce to mass-produce PPEs using locally sourced Taffeta fabric; the Vice President pledged to help donate the PPEs to medical professionals across the country.

=== Mass testing ===
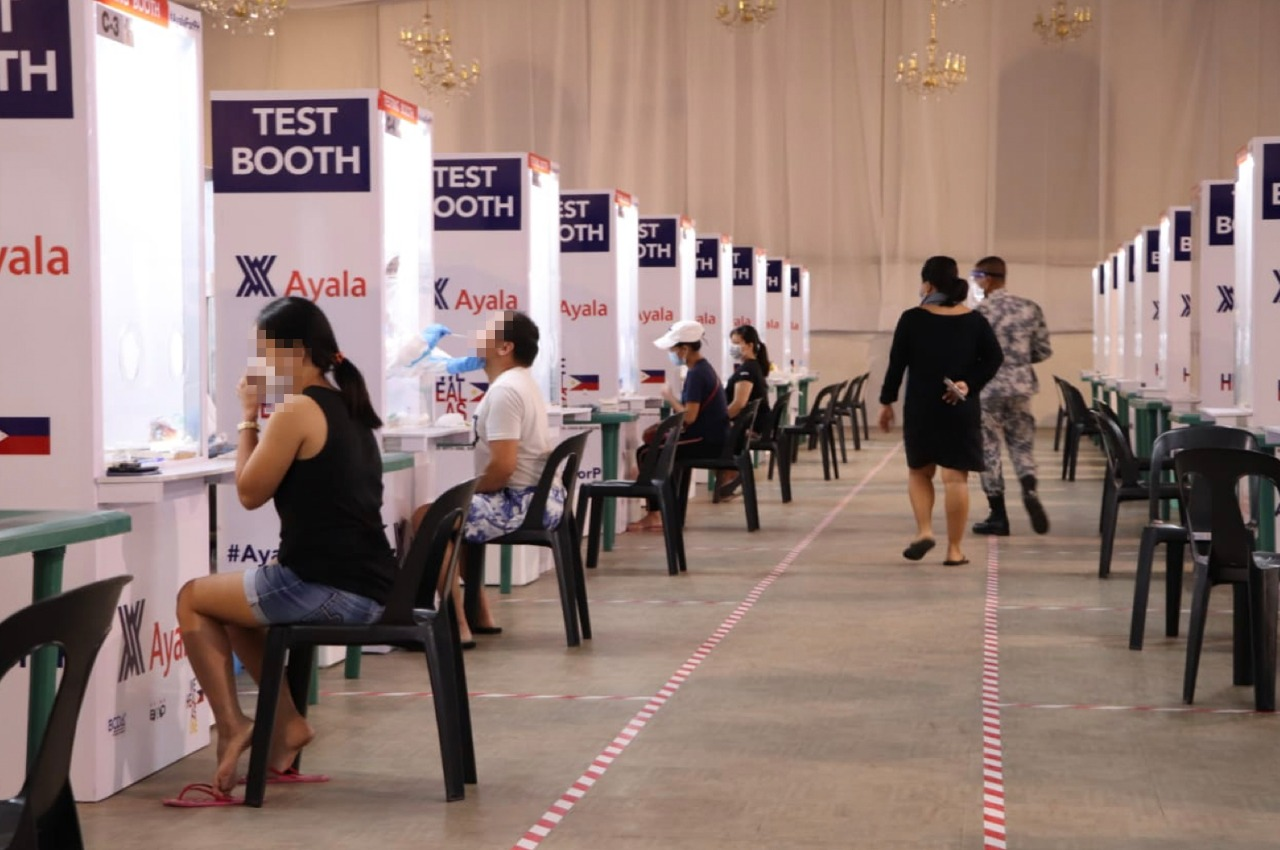
A COVID-19 swabbing center at Palacio de Maynila.

As part of the national government's efforts to conduct mass testing, it began setting up "mega swabbing centers" in May 2020 by repurposing various existing facilities. The first of such facilities opened at the Palacio de Manila along Roxas Boulevard on May 5. These facilities use reverse transcriptase polymerase chain reaction (RT-PCR) kits. The facilities are meant to prioritize the testing of around 25,000 overseas Filipino worker repatriates. Two more facilities opened: at the Enderun Colleges in Taguig and the Mall of Asia Arena in Pasay

A fourth facility was opened on May 20, 2020, at the Philippine Arena to test residents of Bulacan and Metro Manila. All swab samples collected from the testing centers will be processed by the Philippine Red Cross.

As of September 2020, the Philippine Government had reported that over 3 million people have been tested.

=== Travel restrictions ===
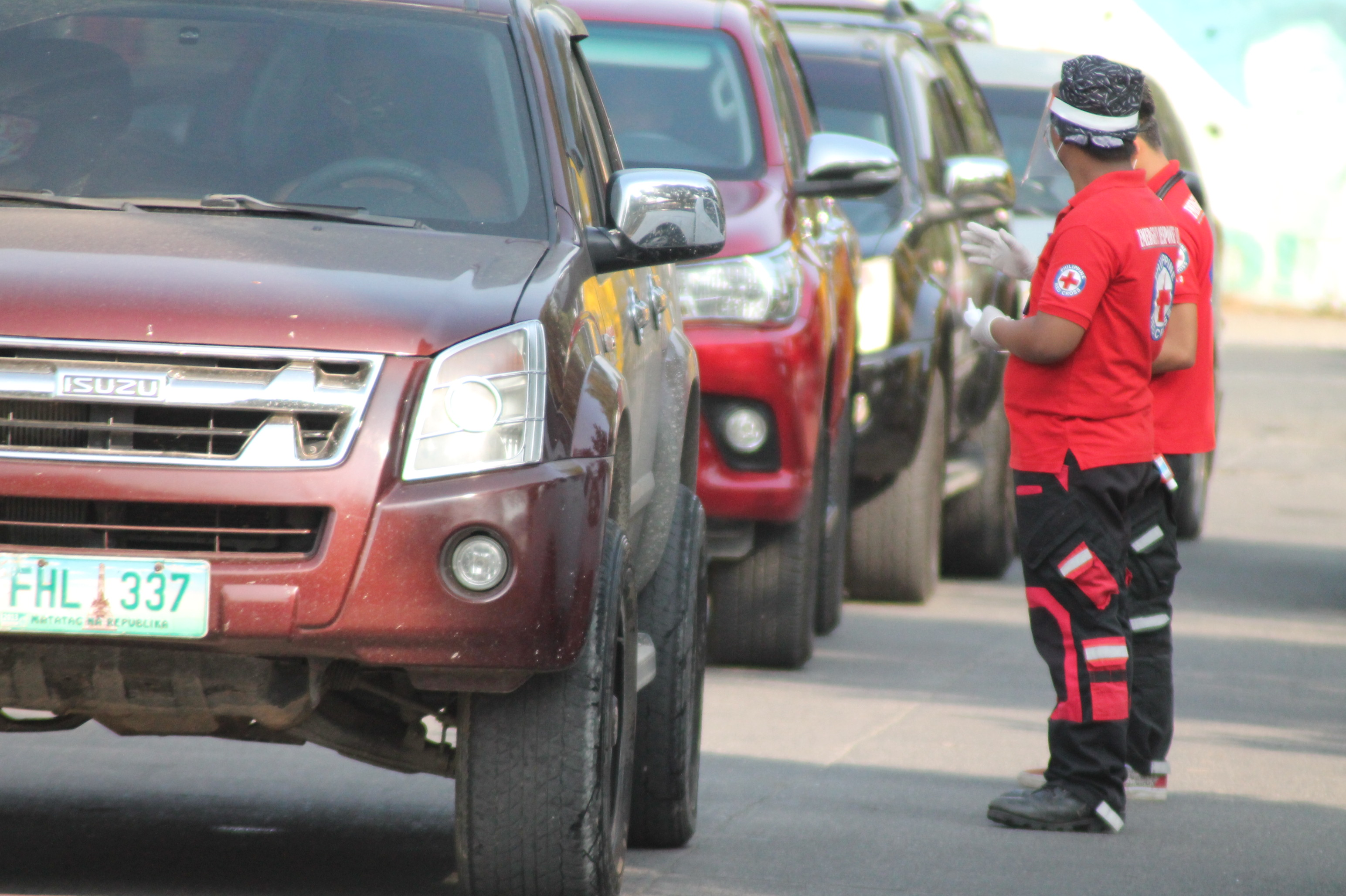
Thermal scanning at Bayombong, Nueva Vizcaya.

Ruffy Biazon, a member of the House of Representatives from Muntinlupa, called on the Civil Aviation Authority of the Philippines (CAAP) on January 22 to suspend flights from Wuhan to the Philippines. Royal Air Charter Service operates direct flights from Wuhan to Kalibo. By then, Philippine travel visas under the "visa-upon-arrival" (VUA) program were denied to tourists from Wuhan. On January 24, the Philippine government deported 135 individuals from Wuhan who arrived in the country through the Kalibo International Airport. There were calls for a wider temporary ban on people entering the country from anywhere in China. This was supported by Senators Ralph Recto, Bong Go, Risa Hontiveros, and Francis Pangilinan. However, the DOH and the Office of the President said there was no urgent need for such a measure.

On January 31, a travel ban on all Chinese nationals from Hubei and other affected areas in China was imposed. The VUA program for Chinese tourists and businessmen was also suspended. On February 2, a ban was introduced on all foreign travelers who visited China, Hong Kong, and Macau in the past 14 days; Philippine citizens and holders of permanent resident visas were allowed in the country but subjected to a mandatory 14-day quarantine. The Philippine government also ordered a ban on travel to China, Hong Kong, and Macau until further notice. On February 10, the ban was further extended to include Taiwan but was lifted on February 15. On February 14, the DOH announced that a risk assessment carried out to determine if Singapore would be placed under a travel ban. Philippine Foreign Secretary Teodoro Locsin Jr. announced that he would not fully support any official travel bans to Singapore. On February 26, travel to South Korea was banned, except for permanent residents, Filipino leaving for study, and overseas Filipino workers returning for work.

The Philippine Ports Authority had barred disembarkation by crew or passengers from vessels that have recently visited China and suspended the visitation privileges of relatives of Filipino seafarers and boarding privileges of non-government organizations providing emotional and spiritual support to seafarers.

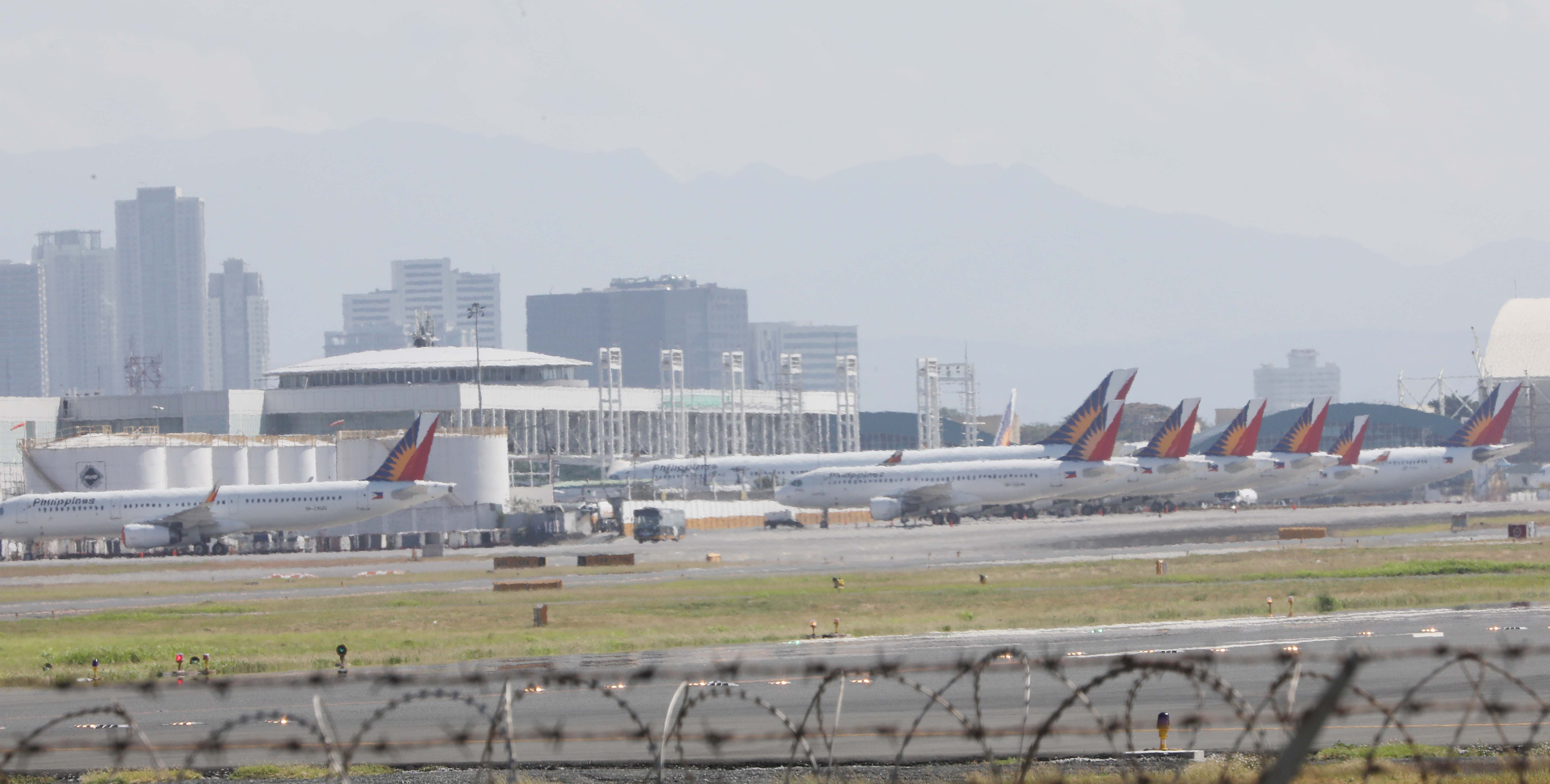
Grounded planes at Ninoy Aquino International Airport in Pasay, Metro Manila.

On March 19, Locsin announced that the Philippine government would deny the entry of all foreign nationals, effective that day "until further notice". All Philippine embassies and consulates would suspend the issuing of its visas to all foreign nationals and invalidate all existing ones. However, Locsin clarified that visas that had already been issued to families of Filipino nationals would remain valid.

On March 22, the Department of Transportation ordered a travel ban to all foreign nationals, with the exception of returning or repatriated overseas Filipinos, foreign spouses of Filipino citizens (and their children), and workers for international organizations and nongovernmental organizations accredited in the country.

The Philippines suspended all inbound commercial flight to its international airports for a week starting May 3. From May 11 to June 10, new regulations were imposed on inbound flights to Ninoy Aquino International Airport with charter flights allowed only on Mondays and Thursdays and commercial flights allowed in all the other five days. All flights required prior clearance from the DFA and CAAP.

=== Repatriation ===
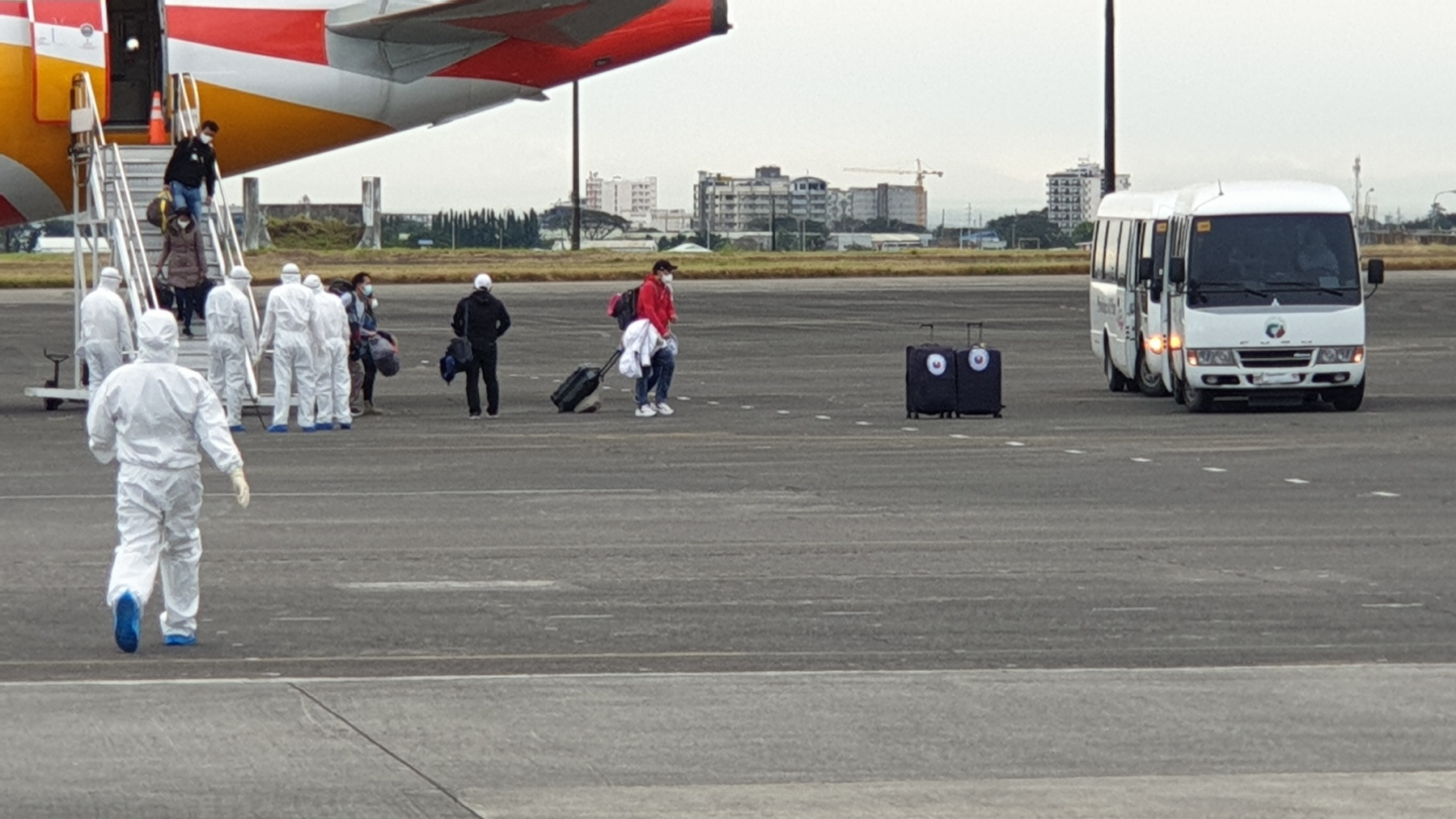
Repatriated Filipinos disembark their plane at Clark Air Base, Pampanga on February 9.

The Philippine national government has repatriated citizens from various COVID-19 affected countries and cruise ships. As of April 13, at least 13,000 overseas Filipino workers have been repatriated according to the DFA. Philippine Airlines, the country's flag carrier, has volunteered several repatriation flights as early as March.

The first of such efforts by the government involved repatriating Filipino nationals in Hubei, China. The government began the repatriation process on January 18. Upon arrival in the Philippines, individuals underwent mandatory quarantine for 14 days.

The Athlete's Village at the New Clark City Sports Hub, which also has a clinic run by the Philippine General Hospital, was chosen as the quarantine site for repatriated Filipinos and New Clark City was locked down on February 6 to prepare for the arrival of the repatriated.

=== Military and police ===
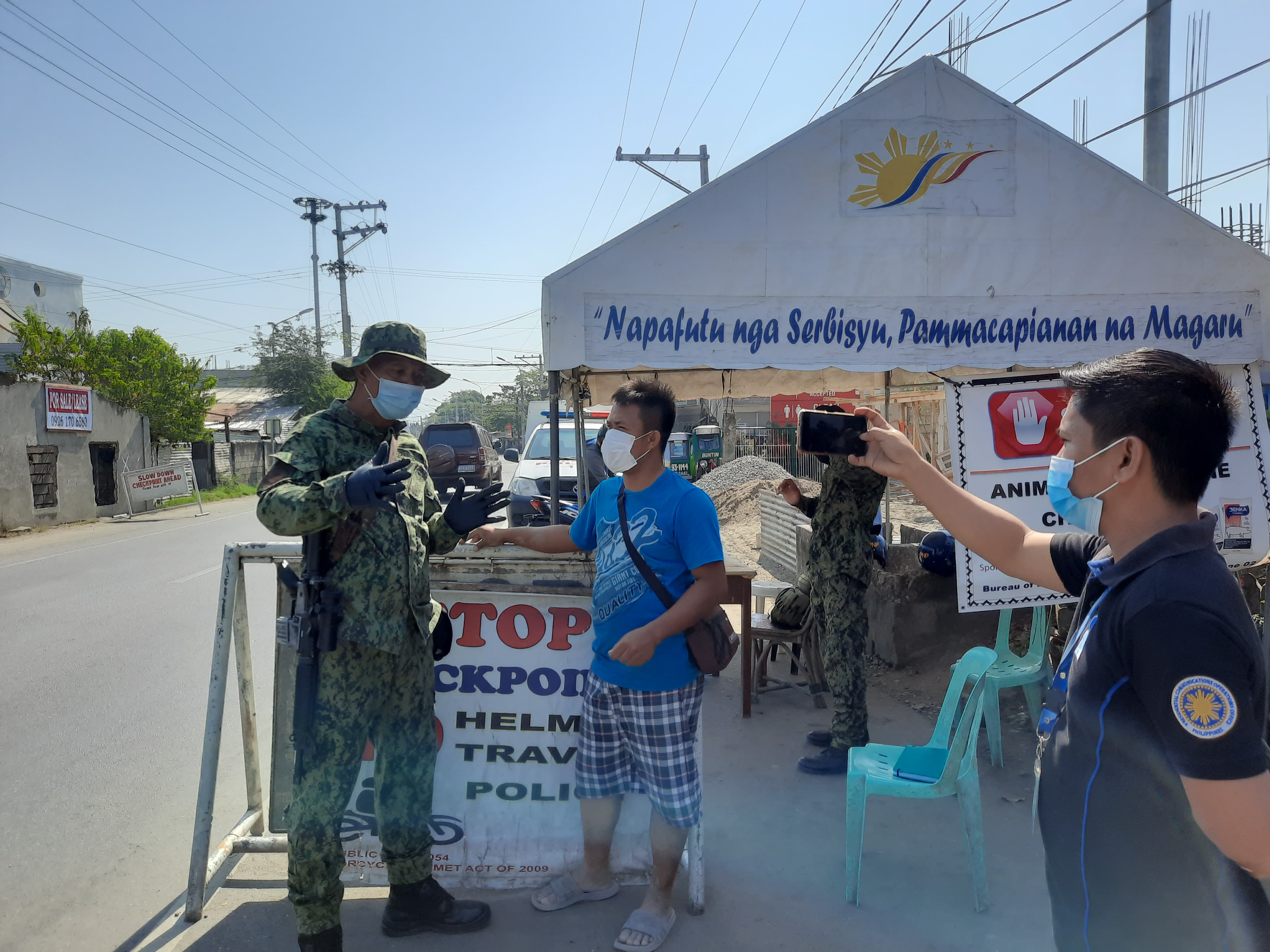
A police-manned checkpoint in Tuguegarao

Both the Armed Forces of the Philippines (AFP) and the Philippine National Police (PNP) have been deployed by the national government as front liners in addressing the pandemic. PNP Chief Archie Gamboa tasked his agency to increase their visibility in various communities and to arrest individuals and groups "without warning" involved in activities that violate quarantine protocols on physical distancing and mass gatherings. Border checkpoints maintained by the AFP, PNP, and the Philippine Coast Guard were installed in areas with community quarantine to control the traffic of people and goods and ultimately contain the spread of the virus across regions during the pandemic.

The PNP have also been tasked to arrest individuals who hoard essential goods in stores and to report firms that fail to comply with the directives of the DTI by manipulating the prices of such goods during the pandemic. The Philippine Air Force and Philippine Navy have utilized their aircraft and vessels for the delivery of personal protective equipment and medical supplies, as well as the transportation of health personnel, to various locations around the country.

On March 24, the PNP launched a task force in collaboration with the Department of Information and Communications Technology to search for and apprehend peddlers of misinformation and fake news related to the pandemic, in compliance with the Cybercrime Prevention Act and the Bayanihan to Heal as One Act. Both laws penalize fake news peddlers for a jail time of 12 years maximum or a fine of up to ₱1 million ($19,770).

Since April 15, PNP personnel have donated portions of their salaries to the Department of Finance to help sustain the national government's efforts in addressing the pandemic. Finance Secretary Carlos Dominguez III reported that, as of May 6, the PNP has raised over ₱228.45 million ($4.5 million) worth of cash donations.

Following the rise in violations by the public to adhere to quarantine protocols, President Rodrigo Duterte has threatened for both the military and the police to "take over" in enforcing the social distancing and curfew guidelines in a similar fashion to martial law. On April 20, a memo from the AFP regarding stricter quarantine protocols was leaked. The memo was later confirmed.

Since April 20, the AFP has deployed its field kitchens in various locations around the country to provide free meals for homeless people, stranded workers and students, informal settlers, and families in "depressed communities" affected by the quarantine impositions.

In July 2020, the Philippine government announced that the PNP will conduct house-to-house searches for people who might have been infected with COVID-19 and then forcibly relocate them to government-run isolation facilities, which according to Human Rights Watch, is a drug war tactic that will violate the rights of citizens.

=== Quarantine and isolation ===
The Department of Public Works and Highways and the Bases Conversion and Development Authority set up quarantine and isolation centers by repurposing facilities as "We Heal As One Centers". As of May 28, 2020, 10 such facilities had been completed.

== Controversies and criticisms ==
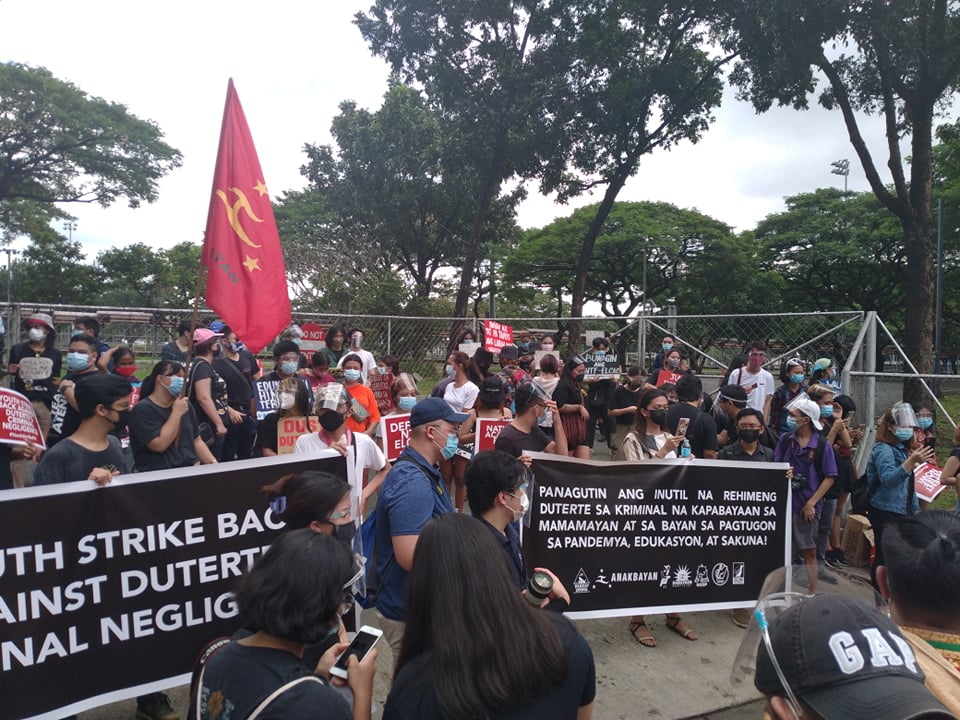
Youth Strike, November 17, 2020, in front of Ateneo de Manila University, was one of the physical protests that criticized government handling of the pandemic, among other issues

The government's handling of the COVID-19 pandemic has received criticism from social media platforms and were also met with physical protests. Drawing on the work of medical anthropologist Gideon Lasco, a report from The Lancet in September 2020 described Duterte's leadership during the pandemic as an example of how 'medical populism' undermines an effective public health response. The government rejected such analyses.

=== COVID-19 testing controversy ===
During the first months of the pandemic in the country, several government officials were reported to have been tested for COVID-19 without complying with the initial triage algorithm used by the Department of Health (DOH), which restricted asymptomatic individuals from being tested. Some family and staff members were also reportedly tested for COVID-19.

On March 24, 2020, the Philippines had only tested 1,793 people due to the lack of testing kits.

Public officials receiving quick results on their tests was perceived to be tantamount to receiving priority treatment as numerous people considered as actual patients under investigation – many of whom were front liners – were dying before their test results were out.

In September 2020, with the improvement of testing capabilities and change in algorithm that focused on front liners and people who were in contact with COVID-infected patients, the government reported that over 3 million people had been tested.

==== Background ====
===== Scarcity of laboratories and test kits =====
The Philippine government did not have the capacity to test for the SARS-CoV-2 virus until January 30, 2020, when the government-run Research Institute for Tropical Medicine (RITM) was finally able to run confirmatory tests. Until that date, samples from suspected COVID-19 cases had to be sent to Victorian Infectious Diseases Reference Laboratory in Melbourne, Australia, for testing.

However, there were still very few testing kits in the Philippines, and the RITM was still the only laboratory that had the ability to process test results. By March 9, 2020, only 200 to 250 tests could be processed per day.

By March 23, 2020, the number had gone up to almost 1,000 a day, as new laboratories gained the capacity to process test results and various entities donated about 100,000 test kits to the RITM. But the Philippines' overall capacity to test for COVID-19 was still very limited given the national spread of the disease.

On April 14, 2020, the Philippines' national government began "progressive mass testing" for COVID-19 after it received "tens of thousands of testing kits" from various donor countries, and SARS-COV-2 test kits produced by the University of the Philippines' Philippine Genome Center became available. To process these tests, the DOH reported that "dozens of testing laboratories" would come online within the month.

===== Philippine triage decision algorithm =====
As soon as the government gained the ability to conduct COVID-19 tests locally, the DOH developed a triage algorithm to serve as a "decision tool." The algorithm, released on January 30, 2020, determined which patients should be allowed to get tested considering the scarcity of test kits and the processing time of the few Philippine laboratories capable of doing COVID-19 tests.

The algorithm, released on January 30, 2020, sorted people into "patients under investigation" (PUI), who would be given tests; and "persons under monitoring" (PUM), who would not be tested, but would be told to go into a 14-day self quarantine. PUIs are individuals with symptoms (fever, respiratory infection, or both) with a history of travel to China in the past 14 days and/or exposure to another individual with confirmed COVID-19 infection. PUMs are individuals with travel history and/or known exposure to a confirmed case but exhibit no symptoms.

==== Prioritized testing for government officials ====
While some VIPs were legitimately on the priority list for testing, some of them who were not PUIs did not follow the medical protocol outlined by the DOH's triage algorithm and were tested ahead of symptomatic people who were on the priority list, hence the VIP treatment controversy. This included family members and the staff of current and former government officials.

Cavite Governor Jonvic Remulla admitted getting tested for COVID-19 despite being asymptomatic, bypassing the DOH's protocol and triage testing algorithm at the time. He later apologized to the public. A senator acknowledged that they got tested not because they were classified as "PUI" but because they were considered as "VIP".

DOH justified testing asymptomatic officials by citing the need to "preserve" certain high-ranking officials. DOH Secretary Francisco Duque III admitted that some "VIPs" have made direct requests to the RITM to be tested first. The DOH later issued a statement saying that these tests were a "courtesy" rather than "VIP treatment", adding that "there is no policy for VIP treatment and that all specimens are being processed on a first-in, first-out basis with courtesy accorded to officials holding positions in national security and public health."

In May 2020, there was a pending House Bill No. 6707 that pushed for baseline PCR testing for "vulnerable members of society", including "vulnerable asymptomatics". Senior Citizens Partylist Rep. Francisco Datol Jr. supported the bill, adding that more than 100 members of Congress who are senior citizens considered vulnerable to the disease should be prioritized for testing. However, he also said that congressmen and their employees should get tested first since they, too, "pay their contributions to the Philippine Health Insurance Corporation (PhilHealth)".

==== Reactions ====
This bypassing of the testing protocol of supposed VIPs has resulted in public outcry, given the scarcity of COVID-19 testing kits available to the public. On March 22, 2020, the hashtags "#NoToVIPTesting" and "#CheckYourPrivilege" trended on Twitter, reflecting public anger on the issue.

Some politicians issued apologies for getting tested, acknowledging that they "may have skipped" the protocols set by the DOH for determining which patients needed to get tested first.

=== NBI investigation of politicians who violated quarantine protocols ===
==== Mayor Vico Sotto ====
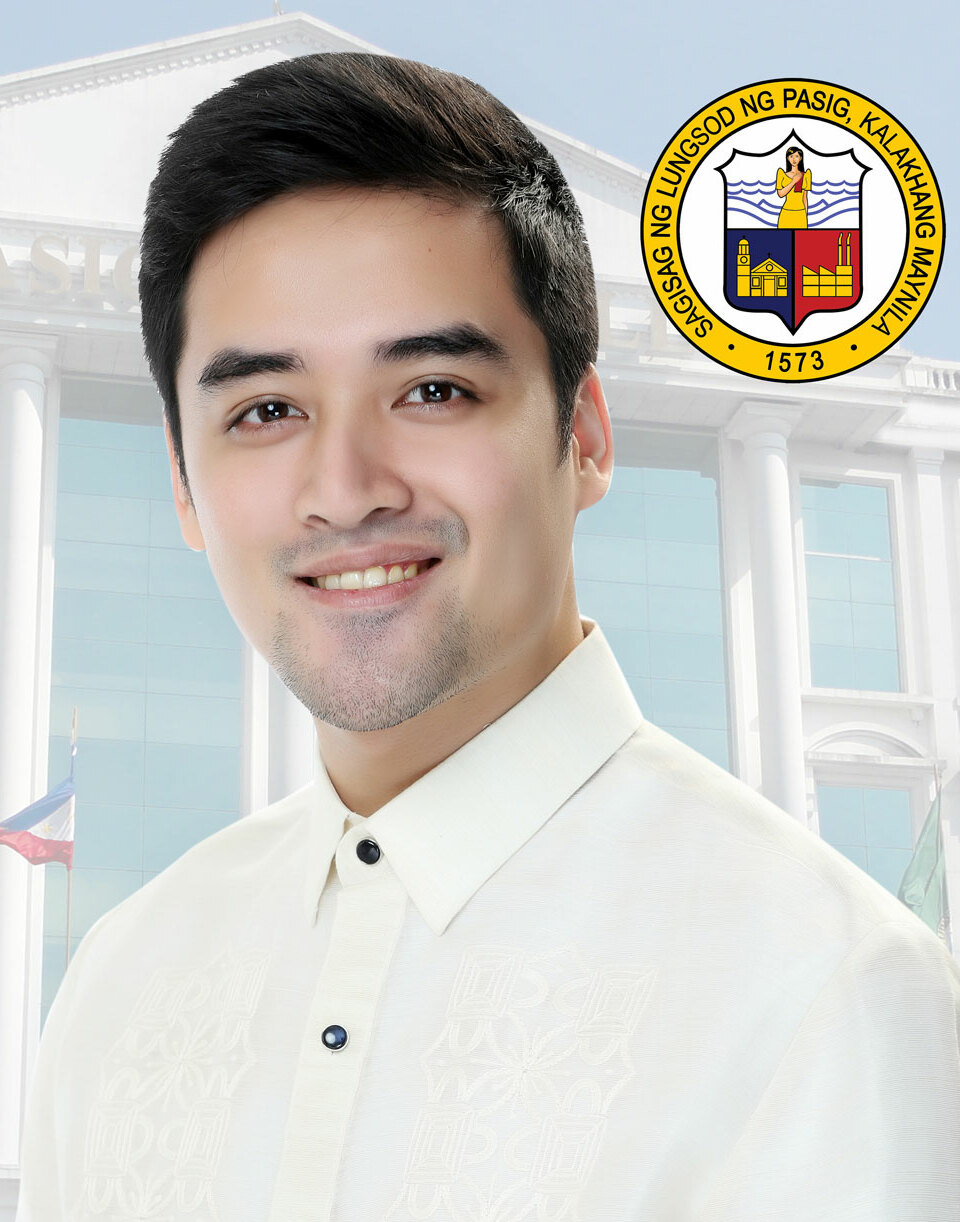
Mayor Vico Sotto

After the imposition of the enhanced community quarantine in Luzon and before the enactment of the Bayanihan law, Pasig Mayor Vico Sotto temporarily allowed limited operation of the city's tricycles to serve health care workers, government personnel and patients, despite the national government's ban on the operation of public transportation. Sotto said that banning all tricycles in the city would bring more risk to the city's health situation. After he aired the views and experiences of the local government of Pasig, Sotto complied with the inclusion of tricycles in the public transportation ban.

The National Bureau of Investigation (NBI), through its Deputy Director Ferdinand Lavin, confirmed on April 1, 2020, that NBI sent an invitation letter to Sotto for violation of Bayanihan to Heal as One Act. Lavin said that Sotto was scheduled to appear at the bureau on April 7, 2020, at 10 am. Sotto responded by saying that he had already complied with the national government's order to stop tricycle operations prior to the implementation of the law. Senate President Tito Sotto, an uncle of the mayor, criticized the move in a tweet, stating "NBI will be well advised to be cautious in their interpretation of the law I principally authored. Any so-called violation of RA 11469 can't be retroactive!". Liberal Party president and Senator Francis Pangilinan also questioned the NBI's actions, stating the unconstitutionality of criminalizing an act committed before the law was passed.

Social media users criticized the NBI for allegedly singling out the mayor, pointing out that Senator Koko Pimentel violated quarantine protocols a few days before but was given consideration by the government.

==== Koko Pimentel ====
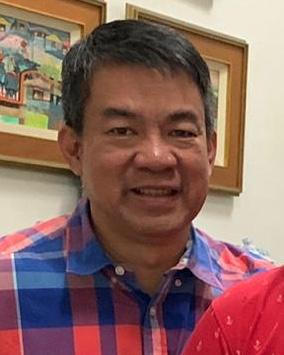
Koko Pimentel

The National Bureau of Investigation (NBI) spokesperson Deputy Director Ferdinand Lavin said that the bureau was also investigating Senator Aquilino Pimentel III for alleged violation of the Bayanihan Heal as One Act. Director Eric Distor of the NBI confirmed that Pimentel would also be invited to the bureau to explain. He would be summoned when his self-quarantine ended.

Pimentel had undergone testing for COVID-19 and was informed that he was positive for the disease while he was at the Makati Medical Center, accompanying his pregnant wife who was scheduled to give birth. The results came out on March 25 and Pimentel was tested positive for COVID-19, making the second Senator to do so after Migz Zubiri.

=== Quarantine violation–related controversies and incidents ===
==== Arrests of protesters in Quezon City ====
On April 1, 2020, around 150 protesters called on the local government for food aid amid the enhance community quarantine in Luzon. Local police dispersed protesters assembled along E. Delos Santos Avenue in Barangay Bagong Pag-asa, Quezon City, arresting 20 in the process for staging a rally without a permit. The NBI probed the incident, though it did not say what violations the organizers might face. The arrests were condemned by urban poor group Kalipunan ng Damayang Mahihirap (Kadamay) chair Bea Arellano.

==== Shooting of Winston Ragos ====
Winston Ragos was a Philippine Army veteran who served in the Battle of Marawi in 2017. He was shot dead by police for allegedly attempting to pull a gun at a checkpoint while the country was under enhanced community quarantine. Witnesses say Ragos did not have a gun and his mother claimed her son was suffering from post-traumatic stress disorder following his tour of duty.

On April 21, 2020, at 2:30 p.m., Police Master Sergeant Daniel Florendo, Jr. and some police trainees from the Philippine National Police-Highway Patrol Group were manning a control point on Maligaya Drive, Barangay Pasong Putik, Quezon City. The police officers said they asked Ragos to go home. They alleged that Ragos attempted to pull out a .38 caliber handgun from his sling bag, prompting Florendo to shoot Ragos. Florendo shot Ragos twice, causing Ragos to stagger before falling to the ground. Ragos was brought to Commonwealth Hospital and was declared dead at 5:57 p.m.

Police alleged to have found a .38 caliber pistol and a quarantine pass. The Philippine National Police (PNP) said that Florendo had made a "judgment call" when he shot Ragos. However, witnesses claimed the victim did not have a gun inside his bag.

Ragos's killing during the quarantine period led to heavy criticism of the PNP. Florendo surrendered to authorities and yielded his service firearm. Senator Risa Hontiveros asked the human rights sector and the police to investigate Ragos's death at the hands of law enforcement officers and said that there is no excuse for brutality and violence towards persons with mental illness and the powerless. The hashtag #JusticeForWinstonRagos trended online. The Quezon City government announced that the Quezon City Police Department was undertaking a thorough investigation of the incident. The Makabayan bloc of the House of Representatives condemned the shooting, saying the incident “highlights the draconian handling” of the coronavirus crisis.

The Philippine Army conferred military honors on former soldier Corporal Winston Ragos. The Philippine Army said it coordinated with Ragos's mother to extend honors to the soldier and proceed with funeral and burial arrangements at the Libingan ng mga Bayani on April 26, 2020.

==== Makati scuffling incident ====
The incident happened in Dasmariñas Village in Makati on April 27, 2020, involving a Spanish citizen, Javier Parra, and the police. The incident occurred when Police Senior Master Sergeant Roland Von Madrona and Bantay Bayan personnel Esteban Gaan were patrolling the village and saw Parra's housemaid, Cherilyn Escalante, watering plants outside his property's perimeter without wearing a face mask. Madrona and Gaan approached the maid and told her to wear a mask; she complied but Parra and his wife went outside and argued with the officers. The argument lasted six minutes and was recorded on video by Gaan. The exchange being recorded made Parra furious, and he proceeded to hurl insults at Gaan. Madrona attempted to arrest him but Parra evaded him and went inside the house. Parra claimed that he was told by the officer he would receive a fine of ₱1,000 due to not wearing the mask.

Officer Madrona filed criminal charges against Parra over the incident.

==== Debold Sinas birthday party controversy ====
Despite a ban on mass gatherings amidst enhanced community quarantine, National Capital Region Police Office (NCRPO) personnel celebrated the birthday of their chief Maj. Gen. Debold Sinas on May 8, 2020, at Camp Bagong Diwa. The birthday celebration was met with criticism on social media. The pictures of Sinas birthday party were circulated on the internet on May 13 showing the attendees appearing to disregard the rules on social distancing and mass gatherings. The Philippine National Police (PNP) chief Gen. Archie Gamboa ordered an investigation over Sinas's birthday party; however Gamboa defended Sinas, saying that he "do not think this is a violation." Responding to the criticism, Sinas issued an apology over the event, saying that he did not intend to disobey the protocols related to the enhanced community quarantine. He also added that some of the photos were manipulated. The NCRPO public information office clarified that some of the photos were taken in December 2019, and coincidentally, Sinas was wearing the same T-shirt on that day. Department of Interior and Local Government (DILG) Secretary Eduardo Año said that Sinas's birthday party "cannot be called a birthday party" but "that is uncalled for." The president added that he needs police officers like Sinas to enforce the law in Metro Manila.

On May 15, 2020, the PNP filed criminal charges against Sinas and 18 other officers who attended his birthday for violating quarantine guidelines. PNP Chief Gamboa said that, despite the controversy, Sinas may not be relieved from his post. Before the event, Sinas served as the police director in Cebu City from July 2018 to October 2019 before he was appointed as National Capital Region Chief Police Officer.

Despite the controversy, President Duterte said that Sinas will not be removed from his post and argued that Sinas is an honest and a good officer. Duterte's statement was met with condemnation from human rights groups.

==== "Non-essential" lugaw delivery viral video ====
The dish made news nationally in March 2021, during the COVID-19 pandemic in the Philippines, after a video surfaced on social media showing a delivery rider affiliated with GrabFood being denied access in Muzon, San Jose del Monte. He was to deliver lugaw to a customer in the barangay. A female barangay official claimed that the rider violated the curfew rules amid the reimplementation of the enhanced community quarantine in the Greater Manila Area, and alleged that lugaw was "not essential". The incident went viral. Responding to the incident, Presidential Spokesperson Harry Roque reiterated that food delivery services should remain unhampered even during the time of the community quarantine. He said that food items, such as lugaw, should be considered essential goods. Initially the official stood by her decision, saying their curfew rules only permitted the operation of food businesses from 5 in the morning to 6 in the afternoon, but later apologized for the incident and said she never meant to offend anyone. She added that she might have been exhausted, which led to her use of wrong words. The barangay also apologized over the incident and vowed such incident will not occur again.

==== Quarantine skipping controversy ====
A returning Filipina OFW named Gwyneth Anne Chua gained widespread media attention after skipping the mandatory quarantine upon arrival in the Philippines from Los Angeles, California, United States, on December 20, 2021. On the investigation by the Department of Tourism (DOT), Chua was seen leaving Berjaya Makati Hotel at 11:45pm, 15 minutes after checking in upon arrival. Supposed to be placed under five-day quarantine, Chua was fetched by her father to attend a party held in Barangay Poblacion in Makati on December 23 and, then on December 25 her mother transported her back to the hotel. On December 26, she underwent swab test and the result came out positive for COVID-19 the next day. She earned the nickname "Poblacion girl" on social media. On January 3, 2022, the Criminal Investigation and Detection Group (CIDG) planned to file charges against Chua, along with eight other people, for violating the sections of Republic Act No. 11332, which states "failure to comply with a quarantine/isolation order or directive duly issued by a public health authority," and "violation of any terms or conditions of the quarantine or isolation order or directive issued by a public health authority." Chua's parents and the personnel of the hotel would also face charges. On the same day, among close contacts of Chua, 11 have tested positive for the virus.

On January 5, 2022, the DOT suspended the accreditation of Berjaya Makati Hotel for three months over breaching the quarantine policy, giving them 15 working days to appeal the decision. On the same day, the Makati City Government, through its Business Permit and Licensing Office, served a closure order on the hotel.

=== Vaccine controversies ===
==== Military and PSG vaccination controversy ====
In 2020, members of the Presidential Security Group (PSG), Cabinet officials, a senator, and the Special Envoy for Public Diplomacy to China received vaccines without clearance from the Food and Drug Administration (FDA) or the Department of Health (DOH).

Duterte said in December 2020 that some members of the military received COVID-19 vaccine from Chinese manufacturer Sinopharm despite the vaccine not yet officially approved by the country's health authorities. A few days later, it was reported that some members of the PSG had also received vaccines from an unknown manufacturer. Defense Secretary Delfin Lorenzana said that the vaccine used by the security group were smuggled. Brig. Gen. Jesus Durante III said that members of the PSG were vaccinated as early as September 2020 and Duterte said that PSG personnel administered the vaccines themselves. Presidential Spokesperson Harry Roque urged the public to "just accept" that some soldiers have received COVID-19 vaccines. On December 28, the Armed Forces of the Philippines said that the PSG members were the first ones to be vaccinated to "protect" Duterte.

On December 29, FDA Director General Enrique Domingo said that the DOH and the FDA were not consulted over the inoculation of soldiers and other government officials. On December 30, Durante said that he will take "full responsibility" for the vaccine administered to the PSG.

In 2021, criminal investigations and hearings were ordered by the National Bureau of Investigation, the FDA, and the Philippine Senate over alleged irregularities with the vaccinations.

On January 4, 2021, Duterte ordered the PSG to either not attend any congressional meeting regarding the unauthorized vaccination or stay quiet during such a hearing, contradicting the Presidential Spokesperson who said that the PSG will submit to any investigation. On January 5, despite Duterte's threat of a potential "crisis" if senators questioned his military bodyguards, the Senate opened an investigation for the unauthorized use of COVID-19 vaccines. On January 6, Senator Sherwin Gatchalian said he found nothing wrong with giving vaccines to PSG members since they were considered frontliners, though he acknowledged and took issue with the fact that the vaccines were brought into the country illegally.

==== Vaccination priority list violations ====
Actor Mark Anthony Fernandez was given the AstraZeneca vaccine in Parañaque on March 22, 2021, despite allegedly not being on the priority list – which includes healthcare workers, followed by senior citizens, and followed by people with comorbidities. Parañaque Mayor Edwin Olivarez defended the vaccination of Fernandez, stating that the city was done inoculating healthcare workers and that Fernandez has comorbidities, making him eligible to be included on the city's "quick substitution list" for vaccination. The actor said that he received the vaccine but did not violate protocol, explaining that he was placed on the substitution list after several health workers failed to show up. President Duterte implied that Fernandez should be investigated when he ordered the DOH to look into the vaccination of an actor whom he did not identify.

On March 24, Duterte named in his public address nine different mayors who jumped the vaccination priority line.

=== Red-tagging on community pantries ===
The community pantries started on April 14, 2021, in the Loyola Heights barangay of Quezon City in the Philippines. It is a trend utilizing a similar concept that emerged across the country, in which small carts carrying essential items are parked along sidewalks for locals to get items for free. A community pantry was first established on Maginhawa Street in Quezon City by 26-year-old organizer Ana Patricia Non on April 14, 2021. Community pantries later spread across the country, many organized by people who are affected by the COVID-19 pandemic, stocking various items and food products.

However, amid reports of red-tagging by the National Task Force to End Local Communist Armed Conflict (NTF-ELCAC) and alleged profiling by police, Ana Patricia Non, fearing for her safety, temporarily ceased operations of her pantry. Non posted screenshots of Facebook posts made by Quezon City Police Department and NTF-ELCAC that claimed the pantries "are being used by communist groups for their propaganda." She appealed to Quezon City Mayor Joy Belmonte for help. The Philippine National Police denied allegations of profiling the organizers even though NTF-ELCAC spokesperson Lt. General Antonio Parlade Jr. explained that the task force was “checking the background” of the organizers who were working to provide food for people affected by the pandemic.

Justice Secretary Menardo Guevarra said that checking the profiles of pantry organizers could violate the Data Privacy Law.

=== Roque's outburst to doctors ===
On September 10, 2021, a video of Presidential spokesperson Harry Roque berating the doctors who opposed the implementation of general community quarantine (GCQ) during the IATF meeting was released to the public. Some groups and netizens condemned Roque's outburst and remarks. Roque later apologized for his remarks, stated that he advocated for the people who suffered hunger and joblessness if the ECQ will continue.

=== Pharmally scandal ===
Pharmally Pharmaceutical Corp. became involved in a scandal over allegations of overpriced medical supplies. The Senate conducted a hearing on the issue on September 24, 2021, where Pharmally's Krizle Mago admitted that the firm tampered with the expiration dates of face shields and that the firm delivered "substandard" face shields to the Department of Health (DOH). After Mago gave her testimony, senators said on September 26, 2021, that they could no longer contact Mago. The issue led the word war between Duterte and Senator Richard Gordon.

=== "No vaccination, no ride" policy ===
On January 17, 2022, the Department Order No. 2022-001 or the "no vaccination, no ride" policy in Metro Manila takes effect, as the country continues to log record-high numbers due to the Omicron-fueled surge. The policy bans the people from using the public transportation who are not fully vaccinated, except for the people "who have medical conditions that prevent them from being inoculated" and "those who need to get essential goods and services". Several lawmakers, netizens, labor groups, and Commission on Human Rights criticized the policy, calling it "anti-poor, anti-commuter, and discriminatory". The Department of Transportation (DOTr) denied that the policy is anti-poor, and added that the policy in public transportation is "legally valid" and to help "maintain and preserve safe travel". The agency also said that the policy does not violate Republic Act No. 11525, or the COVID-19 Vaccination Program Act of 2021, which states that "vaccination cards should not be considered a mandatory requirement for educational, employment, and other government transactions". The government would lift the policy on the areas under Alert Level 2.

=== Others ===
Other controversies including Duterte's threat to arrest who refused to take inoculated by the COVID-19 vaccine.

=== Social media ===
==== Allegations of hospital not counting COVID-19 deaths ====
On April 11, 2020, GMA News anchor Arnold Clavio alleged through his social media account that one hospital in Metro Manila was told not count COVID-19 deaths. Clavio said that the information came from a frontliner that he did not name and posted screenshots of a conversation involving the frontliner. The frontliner alleged that, due to lack of body bags, the bodies were spread out in the hospital hallway. The DOH responded to the allegations, clarifying that the agency has never issued any order to stop the census of COVID-19 deaths. The DOH added that they have spoken to Clavio and that the agency is investigating the allegations. The East Avenue Medical Center also denied the claims that they lack body bags for patients who have died.

==== Criticisms against Duterte ====
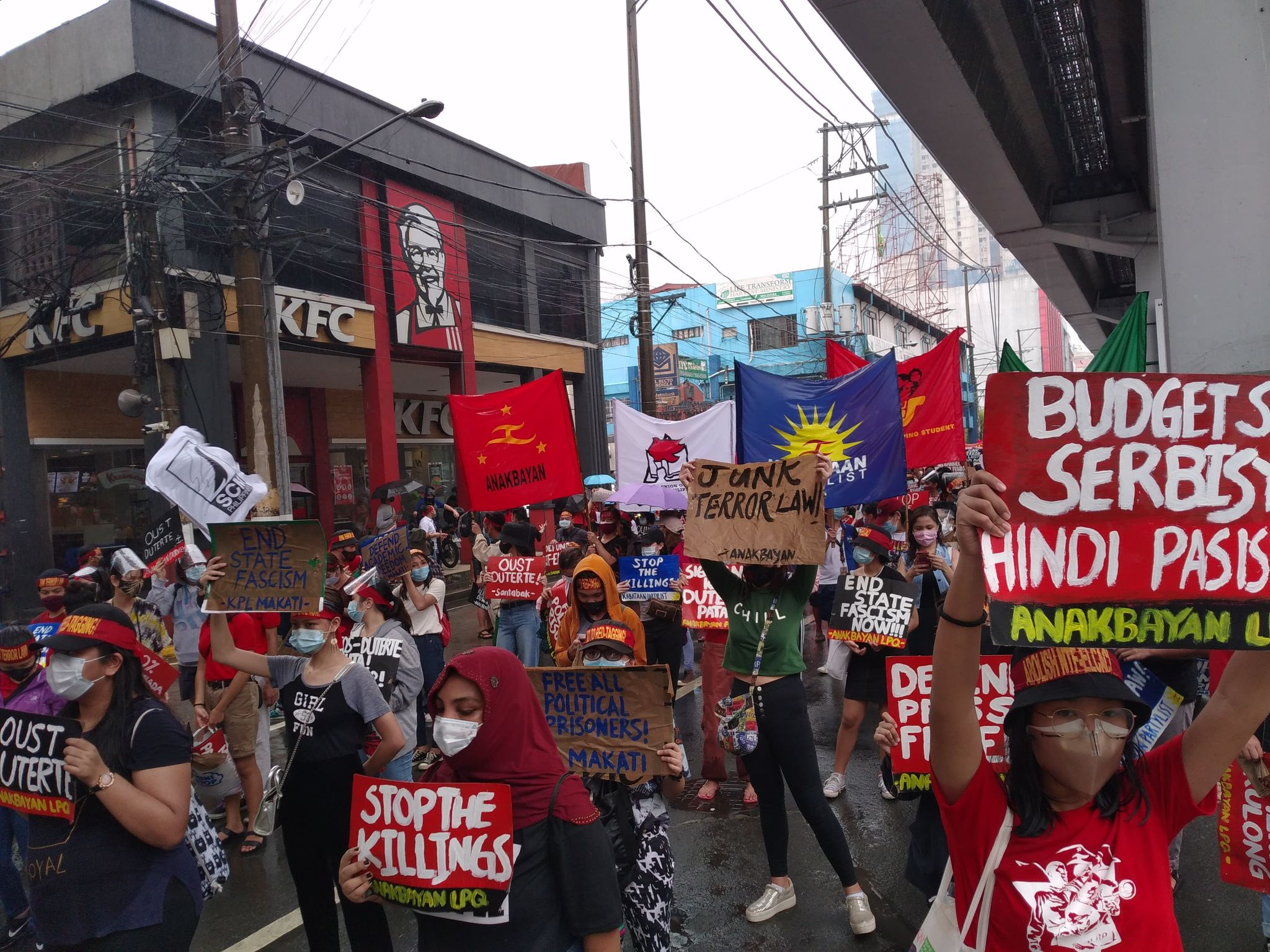
Criticisms against national government response towards COVID-19 and calls to oust Duterte, translated into physical protests. International Human Rights Day, December 10, 2020.

The hashtag #OustDuterte and #OustDuterteNow trended on social media one day after the beginning of pandemic in the Philippines. Netizens accused the government of failing to take immediate action by not imposing a ban on all incoming flights from China.

On April 2, 2020, the hashtag trended again on Twitter, which garnered 327,000 tweets following Duterte's remarks of ordering to "shoot" the violators of COVID-19 quarantine protocol during his speech on April 1. His remarks were widely condemned by Twitter users, including local celebrities.

On March 15, 2021, after a year of the declaration of the community quarantine in Metro Manila, #DutertePalpak went trending on social media. Netizens blamed the government for the resurgence of cases and its lack of proper response to the pandemic but Presidential Spokesperson Harry Roque said that the new variants of the virus caused the resurgence. A day after the hashtag went trending, People's Television Network, a state-run channel, accidentally placed the hashtag on their social media post regarding the provision of masks.

Duterte's cancellation of his weekly national address triggered the hashtag #NasaanAngPangulo (#WhereisthePresident) on April 7, 2021, with which netizens aired their speculations over president's health and his whereabouts. On the same day, Presidential Spokesperson Harry Roque said that Duterte would not deliver his public address due to the rising number of COVID-19 cases. On April 8, Senator Bong Go posted a picture of Duterte seated at a table with various documents. Duterte gave his last address on March 29. On April 10, Go posted another photo of Duterte riding a motorcycle and jogging at night.

== See also ==
- Indian state government responses to the COVID-19 pandemic
- U.S. federal government response to the COVID-19 pandemic
- U.S. state and local government responses to the COVID-19 pandemic
