= MVP Cup =

International basketball tournament

- Most recent season or competition: 2015 MVP Cup
- Logo used since 2015.
- Sport: Basketball
- Founded: 2010 (as the MVP Cup Invitational Championships)
- First season: 2015
- Country: Philippines
- Continent: FIBA Asia (Asia)
- Most recent champion: Philippines (2nd title)
- Most titles: Philippines (2 titles)
- Broadcaster: TV5
- Website: SBP.ph

The Manny V. Pangilinan Cup, also known as the MVP Cup, was an international basketball tournament in the Philippines organized by the Samahang Basketbol ng Pilipinas. An earlier version of the cup, dubbed the MVP Cup Invitational Championships, was conceived in 2010 to prepare the Philippine national basketball team for FIBA-related competitions by having them compete against other national teams or top-level professional clubs.

== History ==
In 2010, the Samahang Basketbol ng Pilipinas, led by the businessman Manny V. Pangilinan, organized a four-day pocket tournament to prepare the Smart Gilas Pilipinas for the 2011 FIBA Asia Championship and the 2010 Asian Games. The tournament, called the MVP Cup Invitational Championships, was set from June 24 to 27, 2010 at the Ninoy Aquino Stadium. The Jordan national basketball team and the Dongguan New Century of the Chinese Basketball Association were both invited to this cup. Philippine Basketball Association clubs Talk 'N Text Tropang Texters and Barangay Ginebra Kings also participated in the event.

In 2015, the cup was revived as a pocket tournament to prepare the Philippine national basketball team for the 2015 FIBA Asia Championship at Changsha, Hunan. The tournament was held from September 11 to 13, 2015 at the Smart Araneta Coliseum. Initially, the national teams of Lebanon and Chinese Taipei and New Zealand-based Wellington Saints confirmed their participation in the event. Lebanon later withdrew from the tournament without playing a game. The national teams of China, South Korea and Senegal had also been invited to join in the tournament but did not confirmed their participation.

The Samahang Basketbol ng Pilipinas projects the MVP Cup to become an annual tournament similar to the FIBA Stanković Continental Champions' Cup and William Jones Cup.

== Results ==
Year	Host	Final			Third place game		
Year	Host	Champion	Score	Second place	Third place	Score	Fourth place
2010; Details	Manila	Philippines	91–80	Jordan	(China); Dongguan New Century	No playoffs	(Philippines); Talk 'N Text
2015; Details	Quezon City	Philippines	No playoffs	(New Zealand); Wellington Saints	(Philippines); Talk 'N Text	No playoffs	Chinese Taipei

== Medal tally ==
=== By country ===
Country	Gold	Silver	Bronze	Total
Philippines	2	0	1	3
Jordan	0	1	0	1
New Zealand	0	1	0	1
China	0	0	1	1

=== By club or team ===
Club or Team	Gold	Silver	Bronze	Total
Philippines	2	0	0	2
Jordan	0	1	0	1
(New Zealand) Wellington Saints	0	1	0	1
(China) Dongguan New Century	0	0	1	1
(Philippines) Talk 'N Text	0	0	1	1

== Participation details ==
Team	MNL 2010	QC 2015	Total
(Philippines) Barangay Ginebra Kings	5th	-	1
Chinese Taipei	-	4th	1
(China) Dongguan New Century	3rd	-	1
Jordan	2nd	-	1
Philippines	1st	1st	2
(Philippines) Talk 'N Text Tropang Texters	4th	3rd	2
(New Zealand) Wellington Saints	-	2nd	1
Teams	5	4	
