= 2015 MVP Cup =

2nd MVP Cup

Tournament details
- Host country: Philippines
- Dates: September 11–13
- Teams: 4 (from 3 federations)
- Venue: 1 (in 1 host city)

Final positions
- Champions: Philippines (2nd title)

The 2015 Manny V. Pangilinan Cup, also known as the Master Game Face MVP Cup 2015 due to sponsorship reasons, was an invitational basketball tournament which was contested by four teams from September 11–13, 2015 at the Smart Araneta Coliseum, in Quezon City, Philippines. While a similarly named tournament was held in 2010, the 2010 MVP Invitational Champions' Cup, the 2015 MVP Cup is considered the inaugural edition of the MVP Cup and is planned to be held annually.

The tournament was a single-round robin format and the champions were awarded $25,000.

== Venue ==
Quezon City
Smart Araneta Coliseum	2015 MVP Cup (Philippines)
Capacity: 25,000	2015 MVP Cup (Philippines)

== Participants ==
- Philippines (hosts)
- Chinese Taipei
- (New Zealand) Wellington Saints
- (Philippines) Talk 'N Text

China, South Korea and Senegal were invited to join the tournament but neither three had confirmed their participation. Lebanon confirmed their participation but later withdrew from the tournament due to undisclosed reasons. Talk 'N Text Tropang Texters was a last minute replacement team following the withdrawal of Lebanon.

== Results ==
=== Standings ===
Team	Pld	W	L	PF	PA	PD	Pts
Philippines	3	3	0	267	235	+32	6
(New Zealand) Wellington Saints	3	2	1	290	242	+48	5
(Philippines) Talk 'N Text	3	1	2	254	285	−31	4
Chinese Taipei	3	0	3	248	297	−49	3

11 September
16:15

Report

Wellington Saints (New Zealand)	108–80	Chinese Taipei
Scoring by quarter: 31–24, 14–18, 31–18, 32–20
Pts: Ruscoe, Turner 25; Rebs: Watkins 13; Asts: Braswell 11		Pts: Liu 13; Rebs: Q. Davis, Liu 6 Asts: Chen S.H., Tsai 3

Smart Araneta Coliseum, Quezon City

11 September
19:00

Report

Talk 'N Text (Philippines)	77–93	Philippines
Scoring by quarter: 22–23, 18–22, 12–24, 25–24
Pts: Fonacier 20; Rebs: Fonacier 9 Asts: Fonacier 4		Pts: Romeo 22; Rebs: Abueva 7 Asts: Romeo 6

Smart Araneta Coliseum, Quezon City

12 September
15:00

Report

Talk 'N Text (Philippines)	99–91	Chinese Taipei
Scoring by quarter: 28–25, 16–22, 21–26, 34–18
Pts: Tautuaa 20; Rebs: Tautuaa 13; Asts: Miranda 6		Pts: Liu 24; Rebs: Q. Davis 9 Asts: Liu 5

Smart Araneta Coliseum, Quezon City

12 September
17:00

Report

Wellington Saints (New Zealand)	81–84	Philippines
Scoring by quarter: 23–20, 19–18, 23–16, 16–30
Pts: Braswell 25; Rebs: Turner 15; Asts: Braswell 5		Pts: Romeo 18; Rebs: Blatche 9 Asts: William 6

Smart Araneta Coliseum, Quezon City

13 September
15:00

Report 1, 2

Wellington Saints (New Zealand)	101–78	(Philippines) Talk 'N Text
Scoring by quarter: 20–14, 28–29, 24–17, 29–18
Pts: Bloxham 20; Rebs: Bloxham, Watkins 8 Asts: Bloxham 8		Pts: Tautuaa 26

Smart Araneta Coliseum, Quezon City

13 September
17:00

Report

Chinese Taipei	77–90	Philippines
Scoring by quarter: 15–27, 19–19, 25–27, 18–17
Pts: Lu 23; Rebs: Tien 5 Asts: Chen S.N. 7		Pts: Blatche 18; Rebs: Blatche 12; Asts: Romeo 4

Smart Araneta Coliseum, Quezon City

== Awards ==
2015 MVP Cup champions

Philippines
Second title
