= ASEAN Convention Center =

- Location within Luzon Location within Philippines

General information
- Status: Completed
- Type: Convention center
- Location: Clark Freeport Zone, Pampanga, Philippines
- Coordinates: 15°11′15″N 120°30′38″E
- Completed: 2016
- Renovated: 2017

Technical details
- Floor area: 5,300 m^{2} (57,000 sq ft)

The ASEAN Convention Center, formerly the Fontana Convention Center, is a convention center at the Clark Freeport Zone in Pampanga, Philippines. The building was originally constructed in February 2016 and was meant as one of the venues of one of the ministerial meetings of the 2017 ASEAN Summit. It was renovated for four months in 2017 and was renamed as the ASEAN Convention Center and the venue hosted the 11th ASEAN Defense Ministers' Meeting.

== History ==
Clark was first chosen as a venue for ministerial meetings during the 2017 ASEAN meetings, but in January 2017 organizers dropped plans to use the Fontana Leisure Parks complex, where the convention center stood. A Philippine organizing-committee official said the venue had to hold about 4,000 participants and guests. He noted that Subic, which had hosted the 1996 APEC summit, had a convention center but lacked enough hotel rooms, unlike Clark and its surrounding areas.

The former Fontana building was later renovated and refurbished as the ASEAN Convention Center, and it served as the official venue of the 11th ASEAN Defense Ministers' Meeting. The design firm Budji Royal Architects aimed to showcase modern Filipino sensibilities, and the renovated building was described as classy, sophisticated and elegant when it welcomed ASEAN ministers and delegates.

The convention center covers an area of 5,300 m^{2} (57,000 sq ft) and has a lobby, four banquet halls and has four Presidential rooms. Its facade was previously yellow in color prior to the 2017 renovations. The judo, jujitsu, and kurash competitions of the 2019 Southeast Asian Games are scheduled to be held at the convention center. During the COVID-19 pandemic, the convention center was temporarily converted to a 150-bed quarantine facility.
