= Ninoy Aquino Stadium =

Sports arena in Manila, Philippines

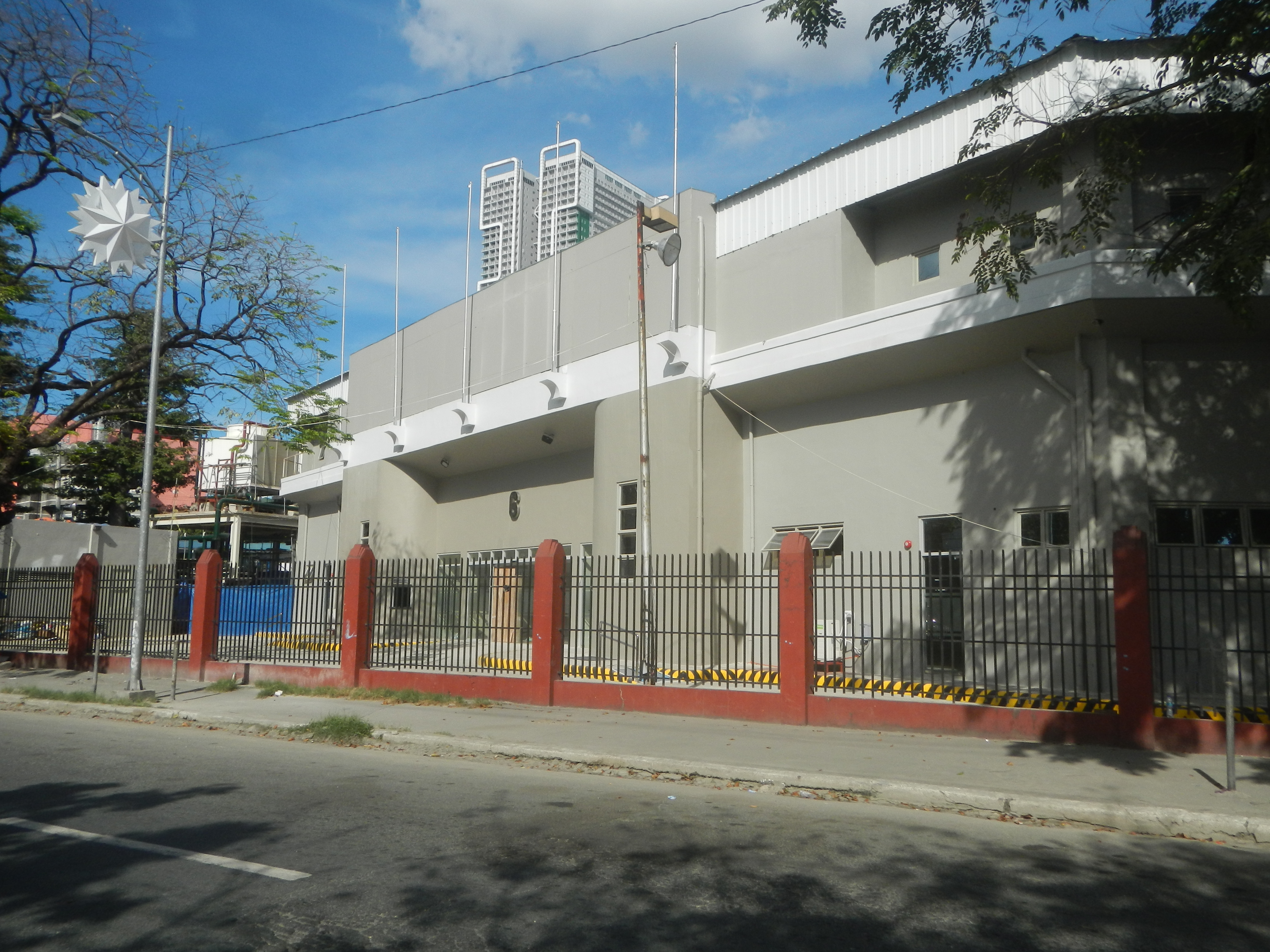
- Ninoy Aquino Stadium in 2021
- Interactive map of Ninoy Aquino Stadium
- Former names: Rizal Multi-Purpose Arena (until 1989)
- Location: Manila, Philippines
- Coordinates: 14°33′52″N 120°59′28″E
- Owner: Philippine Sports Commission
- Operator: Philippine Sports Commission
- Capacity: 6,000
- Public transit: Vito Cruz

Construction
- Renovated: 1989, 2013, 2019

Tenants
- UAAP (1997–2000, 2006–2007); NCAA (1999, 2006); PBA (2010–2011, 2024–present); Manila Metrostars (1998); PBL (1990–1996); Shakey's V-League; Manila Stars (2019–2023)

The Ninoy Aquino Stadium is an indoor sporting arena located in the Rizal Memorial Sports Complex in Manila, Philippines. Originally built in the 1950s, it was renovated and renamed for Philippine senator Ninoy Aquino in 1989.

== History ==
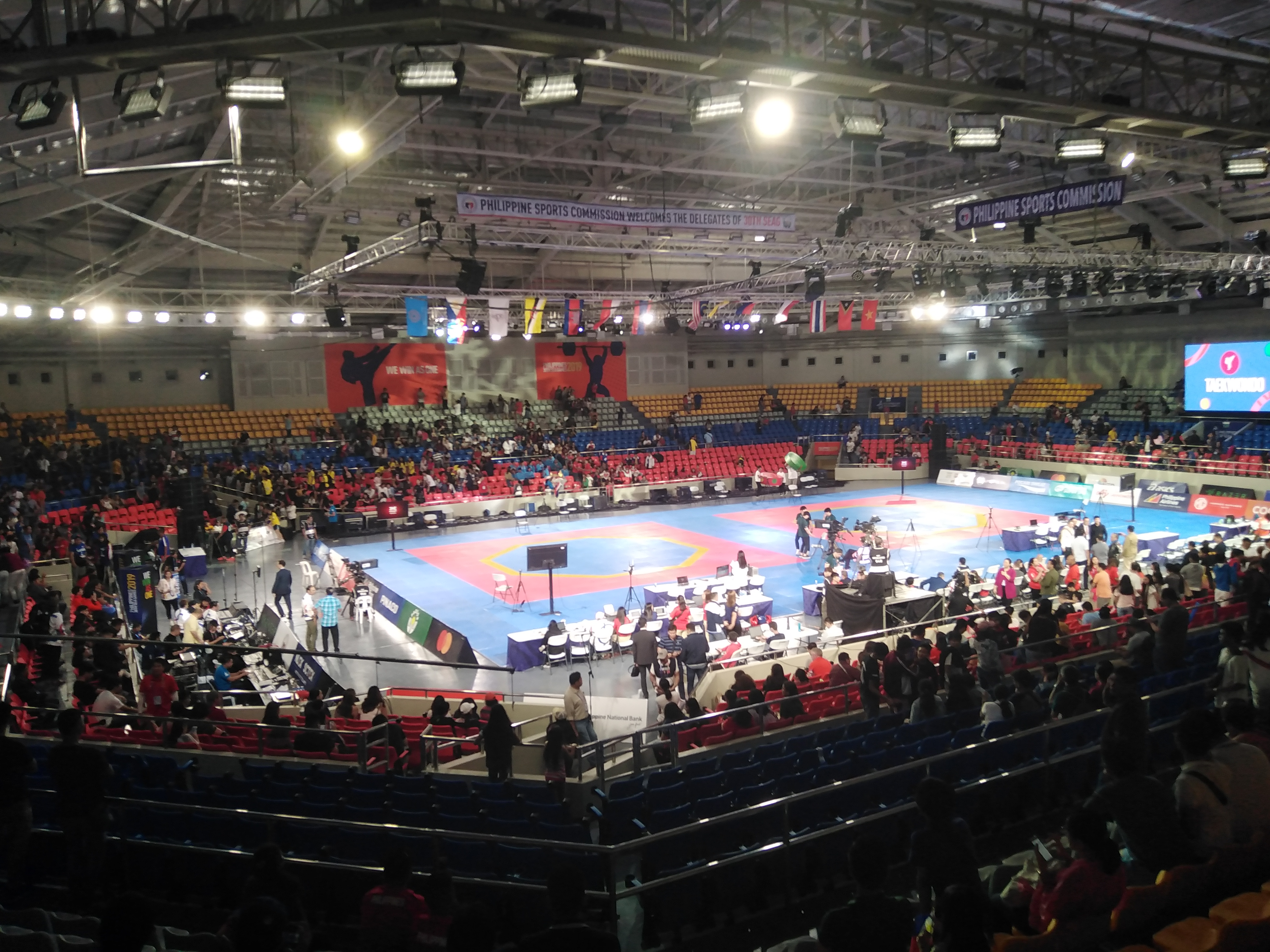
The venue's interior, during the 2019 Southeast Asian Games

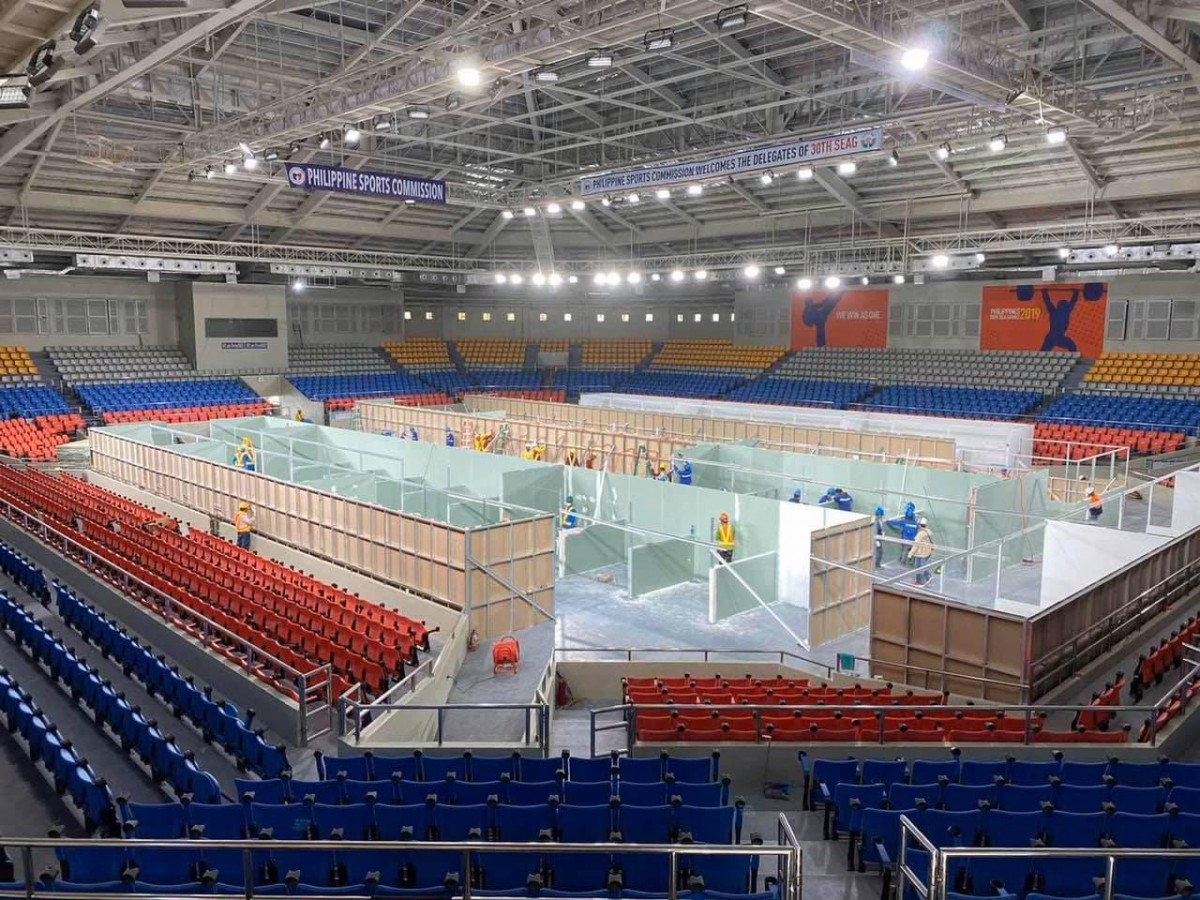
The venue as a COVID-19 quarantine facility

Ninoy Aquino Stadium was originally built in the 1950s as an open-air stadium, in time for the 1954 Asian Games. By the 1980s, it had been converted into an indoor arena named Rizal Multi-Purpose Arena, in time for the 1989 ABC Under-18 Championships, which opened on January 24, 1989. At the opening of the tournament, it was renamed Ninoy Aquino Stadium and a marker dedicating the arena was unveiled. The renovation included new chairs and a new scoring system from South Korea installed by Korean technicians. It also hosted the volleyball tournament of the 1991 Southeast Asian Games, the table tennis competitions of the 2005 Southeast Asian Games and the 2013 FIBA Asia Championship as the second venue of the tournament.

It has also hosted college basketball games (UAAP, NCAA, NCRAA and the NAASCU), taekwondo tournaments, the two editions of the BSCP National Pool Championships and was an alternate venue of PBA games. It was also the home court of the Manila Metrostars in the now defunct Metropolitan Basketball Association.

The Ninoy Aquino Stadium was renovated for the 2019 Southeast Asian Games to host the taekwondo and weightlifting competitions. New seats and a new air-conditioning system were installed in the arena with the plans for the facility to become "high-tech" or up to par with modern standards. Both the NCAA and the UAAP expressed interest to hold their games in the arena again. The renovation of the facility was completed on November 13, 2019, with the send-off ceremony for the Philippine team in preparation for the games held at the arena.

The facility was temporarily used as an refurbished as a quarantine and isolation center in April 2020 during the COVID-19 pandemic.

The wooden flooring used at the Mall of Asia Arena for the 2023 FIBA Basketball World Cup was donated to the Ninoy Aquino Stadium after the event.

== Notable events ==
- Asian Games (1954)
- 1989 ABC Under-18 Championship
- Southeast Asian Games (1991, 2005, 2019)
- 1998 SEABA Championship
- Hillsong United Live In Manila (2008)
- Pinoy Big Brother: Double Up The Big Night
- 2009 Asian Men's Volleyball Championship
- 2010 MVP Invitational Champions' Cup
- 2013 FIBA Asia Championship
- 2023 Asian Rhythmic Gymnastics Championships
- 2024 FIVB Women's Volleyball Challenger Cup
