= Patient under investigation =

Health care patient classification

A patient under investigation (or a person under investigation) refers to a person who had been in close contact with a person with confirmed infection or/and may have been to place where there is an outbreak or superspreading event. This person exhibits the symptoms of the disease and is required to be tested, and undergo a quarantine or isolation while waiting for the laboratory results. It is a term used by health care workers in classifying patients during evaluation and testing in contact tracing in times of infectious disease outbreaks.

== See also ==
- Disease surveillance – Monitoring spread of disease to establish patterns of progression
- Infection control – Medical discipline for preventing nosocomial or healthcare-associated infection
- Pandemic prevention – Organization and management of preventive measures against pandemics
- Social distancing – Infection control technique by keeping a distance from each other
- Super-spreader – Event spreading an infectious disease
- Transmission – Passing of a pathogen from one organism to another
- Triage – Emergency medical process
