= 2010 MVP Invitational Champions' Cup =

Tournament details
- Host country: Philippines
- Dates: June 24–27
- Teams: 5 (from 3 federations)
- Venue: 1 (in 1 host city)

Final positions
- Champions: Philippines (1st title)

The 2010 Manny V. Pangilinan Invitational Championships, also known as the 2010 Smart Philippines Invitational Challenge, was a five-team basketball tournament hosted from June 24-27, 2010. The tournament, named after Filipino businessman and sportsman Manny V. Pangilinan, took place at the Ninoy Aquino Stadium. The Philippine national team became champions, beating Jordan in the finals.

== Venue ==
Manila
Ninoy Aquino Stadium	2010 MVP Invitational Champions' Cup (Philippines)
Capacity: 6,000	2010 MVP Invitational Champions' Cup (Philippines)

== Results ==
The five teams participated in a round-robin elimination round with the top two teams playing for the championships at the finals scheduled on June 27. The two teams from the PBA, Barangay Ginebra Kings and the Talk 'N Text Tropang Texters played no bearing games. Ginebra played two games and Talk 'N Text played just one. All the other teams played three games each in the first round.

Key to colours in group tables
Top two placed teams advance to the finals

=== Standings ===
Team	Pld	W	L	PF	PA	PD	Pts
Jordan	3	3	0	238	209	+29	6
Philippines	3	2	1	229	224	+5	5
(China) Dongguan New Century	3	0	3	192	228	–36	3
(Philippines) Talk 'N Text	1	1	0	85	73	+12	2
(Philippines) Barangay Ginebra Kings	2	0	2	156	166	–10	2

June 24
16:30

Report

Barangay Ginebra Kings (Philippines)	81–84	Jordan
Scoring by quarter: 13–29, 18–13, 21–17, 29–25
Pts: Salvacion 15		Pts: Abbas 21

Ninoy Aquino Stadium, Manila

June 24
19:00

Report

Philippines	74–64	(China) Dongguan New Century
Scoring by quarter: 18–7, 16–25, 17–22, 23–10
Pts: Douthit 26		Pts: Kruger 16

Ninoy Aquino Stadium, Manila

June 25
17:00

Report

Dongguan New Century (China)	73–85	(Philippines) Talk 'N Text
Scoring by quarter: 15–26, 19–21, 21–23, 18–15
Pts: Kruger 24		Pts: Yee 15

Ninoy Aquino Stadium, Manila

June 25
19:00

Report

Jordan	85–73	Philippines
		Pts: Douthit 18

Ninoy Aquino Stadium, Manila

June 26

Report

Jordan	69–55	(China) Dongguan New Century
Pts: Hadrab 16

Ninoy Aquino Stadium, Manila

June 26

Report

Philippines	82–75	(Philippines) Barangay Ginebra Kings
Pts: Lutz 15		Pts: Villanueva 13

Ninoy Aquino Stadium, Manila

=== Final ===
June 27

Report

Philippines	91–80	Jordan
Scoring by quarter: 19–22, 26–14, 18–27, 28–17
Pts: Baracael 22		Pts: Abbas 25

Ninoy Aquino Stadium, Manila

== Awards ==
2010 MVP Cup champions

Philippines
First title
