= 2013 FIBA Asia Championship Group D =

Group D of the 2013 FIBA Asia Championship took place from 1 to 3 August 2011. This is the preliminary round of the 2013 FIBA Asia Championship, with the three teams with the best record (Kazakhstan, Bahrain and India) advancing to 2013 FIBA Asia Championship Group F.

Three games will be played at the Ninoy Aquino Stadium in Manila, Philippines, while the other three games will be played at the Mall of Asia Arena at nearby Pasay. Thailand, the last placed team, was relegated to the 13th–15th classification round.

== Summary ==
In Manila, Bahrain defeated India in their opening round via overtime; Mohamed Kawaid scored on a three-pointer to tie the game in regulation, while Mohamed Ebrahim converted a three-pointer of his own at with 49 seconds left in OT to put the Bahrainis up for good. In Pasay, the Kazakhs won when they built a large enough lead at the end of the third quarter that made a comeback from Thailand impossible. In a game of first day winners, the match in Manila went into overtime anew when Jerri Johnson scored on a three-pointer with 15 seconds left. In the overtime, Konstantin Dvirnyy scored the marginal free-throws with 21 seconds left to win the game for Kazakhstan. Elsewhere, India scored an easy win against Thailand in the game held at Pasay. On the final day, Bahrain and Kazakhstan easily beat Thailand and India respectively, qualifying both to the second round; India's win against Thailand the night earlier qualified them for the second round.

== Standings ==
| Qualified for the Second Round Group F |
| Relegated to 13th–15th Classification |

| Team | Pld | W | L | PF | PA | PD | Pts |
|---|---|---|---|---|---|---|---|
| Kazakhstan | 3 | 3 | 0 | 240 | 210 | +30 | 6 |
| Bahrain | 3 | 2 | 1 | 244 | 221 | +23 | 5 |
| India | 3 | 1 | 2 | 236 | 227 | +9 | 4 |
| Thailand | 3 | 0 | 3 | 194 | 256 | −62 | 3 |

All times are local (UTC+8).'

== August 1 ==
=== India vs. Bahrain ===
1 August 2013
18:00

Report

| India | 80–82 (OT) | Bahrain |
Scoring by quarter: 17–25, 15–12, 26–15, 12–18, Overtime: 10–12
| Pts: Grewal 25; Rebs: Al. Singh, At. Singh 10; Asts: Kadam 5 | | Pts: Kawaid 25; Rebs: Giles 14; Asts: Ismaeel 5 |

Ninoy Aquino Stadium, Manila
Referees: Jassim Abdullah (QAT), Chen Ying-Cheng (TPE), Harja Jaladri (INA)

India
| # | Player | Min | FG | | 2FG | | FT | | REB | | | AST | PF | TO | STL | BS | Pts |
| # | Player | Min | M/A | % | M/A | % | M/A | % | OFF | DEF | TOT | AST | PF | TO | STL | BS | Pts |
|---|---|---|---|---|---|---|---|---|---|---|---|---|---|---|---|---|---|
| 4 | Sambhaji Kadam | 30 | 0/4 | 0 | 0/2 | 0 | 3/6 | 50 | 0 | 4 | 4 | 5 | 3 | 4 | 1 | 0 | 3 |
| 5 | Narender Kumar Grewal | 37 | 11/16 | 68.8 | 11/14 | 78.6 | 3/7 | 42.9 | 1 | 2 | 3 | 1 | 0 | 0 | 2 | 0 | 25 |
| 6 | Pratham Singh | Did not play | | | | | | | | | | | | | | | |
| 7 | Vinay Kaushik | 3 | 0/1 | 0 | 0/0 | 0 | 0/0 | 0 | 0 | 0 | 0 | 0 | 0 | 0 | 0 | 0 | 0 |
| 8 | Arjun Singh | Did not play | | | | | | | | | | | | | | | |
| 9 | Vishesh Bhriguvanshi | 43 | 5/13 | 38.5 | 5/12 | 41.7 | 2/3 | 66.7 | 4 | 5 | 9 | 4 | 2 | 4 | 1 | 0 | 12 |
| 10 | Amritpal Singh | 42 | 6/20 | 30 | 6/20 | 30 | 2/8 | 25 | 3 | 11 | 14 | 1 | 4 | 5 | 0 | 3 | 14 |
| 11 | Joginder Singh | 16 | 2/6 | 33.3 | 0/1 | 0 | 0/0 | 0 | 0 | 1 | 1 | 2 | 5 | 3 | 0 | 0 | 6 |
| 12 | Satnam Singh Bhamara | Did not play | | | | | | | | | | | | | | | |
| 13 | Amjyot Singh | 35 | 7/12 | 58.3 | 7/12 | 58.3 | 2/2 | 100 | 5 | 9 | 14 | 2 | 5 | 5 | 1 | 0 | 10 |
| 14 | Yadwinder Singh | 15 | 0/3 | 0 | 0/1 | 0 | 0/0 | 0 | 1 | 4 | 5 | 0 | 5 | 1 | 0 | 0 | 0 |
| 15 | Rikin Shantilal Pethani | 5 | 2/2 | 100 | 2/2 | 100 | 0/0 | 0 | 0 | 0 | 0 | 0 | 2 | 0 | 0 | 0 | 4 |
| Totals | | 225 | 33/77 | 42.9 | 31/64 | 48.4 | 12/26 | 46.2 | 19 | 36 | 55 | 15 | 26 | 22 | 5 | 3 | 80 |

Bahrain
| # | Player | Min | FG | | 2FG | | FT | | REB | | | AST | PF | TO | STL | BS | Pts |
| # | Player | Min | M/A | % | M/A | % | M/A | % | OFF | DEF | TOT | AST | PF | TO | STL | BS | Pts |
|---|---|---|---|---|---|---|---|---|---|---|---|---|---|---|---|---|---|
| 4 | Mohamed Ebrahim | 36 | 5/16 | 31.2 | 2/7 | 28.6 | 0/0 | 0 | 1 | 1 | 2 | 3 | 3 | 4 | 1 | 0 | 13 |
| 5 | Hussain Al-Tawash | 17 | 0/4 | 0 | 0/2 | 0 | 1/2 | 50 | 0 | 3 | 3 | 2 | 1 | 1 | 0 | 0 | 1 |
| 6 | Mohamed Kawaid | 44 | 6/12 | 50 | 4/8 | 50 | 11/11 | 100 | 1 | 3 | 4 | 1 | 3 | 2 | 2 | 0 | 25 |
| 7 | Bader Malabes | 18 | 3/6 | 50 | 2/3 | 66.7 | 0/0 | 0 | 0 | 1 | 1 | 0 | 1 | 1 | 0 | 0 | 7 |
| 8 | Ahmed Ismaeel | 29 | 3/8 | 37.5 | 2/3 | 66.7 | 4/10 | 40 | 1 | 5 | 6 | 5 | 4 | 3 | 1 | 0 | 11 |
| 9 | Mohamed Alderazi | 29 | 3/8 | 37.5 | 1/3 | 33.3 | 2/2 | 100 | 2 | 0 | 2 | 1 | 3 | 2 | 1 | 0 | 10 |
| 10 | Ahmed Alderazi | Did not play | | | | | | | | | | | | | | | |
| 11 | Subah Azzam | 1 | 0/0 | 0 | 0/0 | 0 | 0/0 | 0 | 0 | 0 | 0 | 0 | 0 | 0 | 0 | 0 | 0 |
| 12 | Chester Giles | 30 | 6/12 | 50 | 6/12 | 50 | 1/4 | 25 | 3 | 11 | 14 | 1 | 4 | 2 | 0 | 0 | 13 |
| 13 | Yunes Kawaid | 5 | 0/1 | 0 | 0/1 | 0 | 0/0 | 0 | 0 | 0 | 0 | 0 | 2 | 0 | 0 | 0 | 0 |
| 14 | Ahmed Akber | 9 | 0/1 | 0 | 0/1 | 0 | 2/2 | 100 | 0 | 0 | 0 | 0 | 3 | 2 | 0 | 0 | 2 |
| 15 | Ahmed Aman | 6 | 0/1 | 0 | 0/0 | 0 | 0/0 | 0 | 0 | 2 | 2 | 0 | 1 | 1 | 0 | 0 | 0 |
| Totals | | 225 | 26/69 | 37.7 | 17/40 | 42.5 | 21/31 | 67.7 | 12 | 32 | 44 | 13 | 25 | 21 | 5 | 4 | 82 |

=== Kazakhstan vs. Thailand ===
1 August 2013
22:30

Report

| Kazakhstan | 81–67 | Thailand |
Scoring by quarter: 26–15, 16–18, 27–14, 12–20
| Pts: Ponomarev 21; Rebs: Ponomarev 13; Asts: Johnson 8 | | Pts: Dg. Apiromvilaichai 16; Rebs: Dg. Apiromvilaichai, Tongsri 4 Asts: Dg. Apiromvilaichai 4 |

Mall of Asia Arena, Pasay
Referees: Yuji Hirahara (JPN), Ling Peng (CHN), Shin Gi-Rok (KOR)

Kazakhstan
| # | Player | Min | FG | | 2FG | | FT | | REB | | | AST | PF | TO | STL | BS | Pts |
| # | Player | Min | M/A | % | M/A | % | M/A | % | OFF | DEF | TOT | AST | PF | TO | STL | BS | Pts |
|---|---|---|---|---|---|---|---|---|---|---|---|---|---|---|---|---|---|
| 4 | Timur Sultanov | 7 | 0/0 | 0 | 0/0 | 0 | 0/0 | 0 | 0 | 1 | 1 | 1 | 1 | 2 | 0 | 1 | 0 |
| 5 | Jerry Johnson | 28 | 6/11 | 54.55 | 5/5 | 100 | 2/3 | 66.67 | 2 | 2 | 4 | 8 | 3 | 2 | 1 | 0 | 15 |
| 6 | Rustam Murzagaliyev | 27 | 4/8 | 50 | 1/2 | 50 | 2/4 | 50 | 2 | 1 | 3 | 3 | 1 | 2 | 0 | 0 | 13 |
| 7 | Mikhail Yevstigneyev | Did not play | | | | | | | | | | | | | | | |
| 8 | Vitaliy Lapchenko | 26 | 3/6 | 50 | 3/5 | 60 | 0/0 | 0 | 3 | 3 | 6 | 0 | 3 | 3 | 0 | 0 | 6 |
| 9 | Nikolay Bazhkin | 3 | 0/0 | 0 | 0/0 | 0 | 0/0 | 0 | 0 | 0 | 0 | 0 | 0 | 1 | 0 | 0 | 0 |
| 10 | Konstantin Dvirnyy | 12 | 2/5 | 40 | 2/5 | 40 | 0/0 | 0 | 0 | 0 | 0 | 1 | 1 | 0 | 0 | 0 | 4 |
| 11 | Anton Ponomarev | 26 | 5/11 | 45.45 | 5/9 | 55.56 | 11/18 | 61.11 | 8 | 5 | 13 | 1 | 2 | 2 | 1 | 1 | 21 |
| 12 | Dmitriy Klimov | 24 | 5/11 | 45.45 | 3/7 | 42.86 | 0/0 | 0 | 1 | 6 | 7 | 2 | 3 | 0 | 0 | 0 | 12 |
| 13 | Rustam Yargaliyev | 29 | 3/12 | 25 | 2/6 | 33.33 | 0/0 | 0 | 5 | 4 | 9 | 2 | 3 | 3 | 0 | 0 | 7 |
| 14 | Leonid Bondarovich | Did not play | | | | | | | | | | | | | | | |
| 15 | Alexander Zhigulin | 14 | 1/3 | 33.33 | 0/1 | 0 | 0/0 | 0 | 3 | 2 | 5 | 0 | 2 | 2 | 0 | 0 | 3 |
| Totals | | 200 | 29/67 | 43.28 | 21/40 | 52.5 | 15/25 | 60 | 24 | 24 | 48 | 18 | 19 | 17 | 2 | 2 | 81 |

Thailand
| # | Player | Min | FG | | 2FG | | FT | | REB | | | AST | PF | TO | STL | BS | Pts |
| # | Player | Min | M/A | % | M/A | % | M/A | % | OFF | DEF | TOT | AST | PF | TO | STL | BS | Pts |
|---|---|---|---|---|---|---|---|---|---|---|---|---|---|---|---|---|---|
| 4 | Chanachon Klahan | 7 | 2/3 | 66.67 | 0/0 | 0 | 0/0 | 0 | 0 | 0 | 0 | 0 | 2 | 0 | 0 | 0 | 6 |
| 5 | Attaporn Lertmalaiporn | 16 | 0/1 | 0 | 0/1 | 0 | 0/0 | 0 | 0 | 0 | 0 | 2 | 0 | 3 | 0 | 0 | 0 |
| 6 | Wattana Suttisin | 19 | 0/1 | 0 | 0/0 | 0 | 3/6 | 50 | 1 | 2 | 3 | 1 | 2 | 3 | 0 | 0 | 3 |
| 7 | Danai Kongkum | 23 | 2/4 | 50 | 2/4 | 50 | 2/2 | 100 | 0 | 3 | 3 | 2 | 1 | 2 | 1 | 0 | 6 |
| 8 | Wutipong Dasom | 11 | 0/1 | 0 | 0/1 | 0 | 2/2 | 100 | 0 | 1 | 1 | 1 | 2 | 1 | 1 | 0 | 2 |
| 9 | Anasawee Klaewnarong | 15 | 3/5 | 60 | 2/2 | 100 | 1/2 | 50 | 0 | 1 | 1 | 0 | 1 | 1 | 0 | 0 | 8 |
| 10 | Darongpan Apiromvilaichai | 17 | 4/7 | 57.14 | 4/7 | 57.14 | 1/2 | 50 | 0 | 2 | 2 | 1 | 1 | 5 | 0 | 0 | 9 |
| 11 | Darunpong Apiromvilaichai | 34 | 5/16 | 31.25 | 4/8 | 50 | 5/6 | 83 | 2 | 2 | 4 | 4 | 2 | 1 | 1 | 2 | 16 |
| 12 | Sukhdave Ghogar | 15 | 1/3 | 33.33 | 1/3 | 33.33 | 0/0 | 0 | 0 | 1 | 1 | 1 | 3 | 1 | 1 | 0 | 2 |
| 13 | Kannawat Lertlaokul | 16 | 4/5 | 80 | 3/4 | 75 | 0/0 | 0 | 1 | 1 | 2 | 1 | 3 | 1 | 0 | 0 | 9 |
| 14 | Kannut Samerjai | 1 | 0/0 | 0 | 0/0 | 0 | 0/0/ | 0 | 0 | 0 | 0 | 0 | 0 | 0 | 0 | 0 | 0 |
| 15 | Wacharapong Tongsri | 20 | 3/6 | 50 | 3/4 | 75 | 0/0 | 0 | 1 | 3 | 4 | 0 | 4 | 0 | 0 | 0 | 6 |
| Totals | | 200 | 24/52 | 46.15 | 19/34 | 55.88 | 14/20 | 70 | 5 | 16 | 21 | 13 | 21 | 18 | 4 | 2 | 67 |

== August 2 ==
=== Kazakhstan vs. Bahrain ===
2 August 2013
18:00

Report

| Kazakhstan | 79–76 (OT) | Bahrain |
Scoring by quarter: 18–11, 4–11, 18–21, 26–23, Overtime: 13–10
| Pts: Yargaliyev 19; Rebs: Yevstigneyev 10; Asts: Johnson 8 | | Pts: Malabes, Ismaeel 14; Rebs: Giles 12; Asts: Kawaid 3 |

Ninoy Aquino Stadium, Manila
Referees: Wang Xiao Chun (CHN), Naser Mohammad Ramadan Abu Rashed (JOR), Tan Chin Siong (MAS)

Kazakhstan
| # | Player | Min | FG | | 2FG | | FT | | REB | | | AST | PF | TO | STL | BS | Pts |
| # | Player | Min | M/A | % | M/A | % | M/A | % | OFF | DEF | TOT | AST | PF | TO | STL | BS | Pts |
|---|---|---|---|---|---|---|---|---|---|---|---|---|---|---|---|---|---|
| 4 | Timur Sultanov | 4 | 0/2 | 0/2 | 0/0 | 0 | 0/0 | 0 | 0 | 0 | 0 | 0 | 1 | 0 | 0 | 0 | 0 |
| 5 | Jerry Johnson | 40 | 5/13 | 38.46 | 4/7 | 57.14 | 7/8 | 87.5 | 1 | 6 | 7 | 8 | 2 | 1 | 2 | 0 | 18 |
| 6 | Rustam Murzagaliyev | 12 | 1/4 | 25 | 0/0 | 0 | 0/0 | 0 | 1 | 3 | 4 | 1 | 2 | 1 | 0 | 0 | 3 |
| 7 | Mikhail Yevstigneyev | 28 | 3/9 | 33.33 | 3/9 | 33.33 | 10/15 | 66.67 | 6 | 4 | 10 | 1 | 4 | 2 | 1 | 0 | 16 |
| 8 | Vitaliy Lapchenko | 12 | 1/5 | 20 | 1/4 | 25 | 0/0 | 0 | 2 | 0 | 2 | 1 | 2 | 1 | 0 | 0 | 2 |
| 9 | Nikolay Bazhkin | Did not play | | | | | | | | | | | | | | | |
| 10 | Konstantin Dvirnyy | 35 | 3-9 | 33.33 | 3/5 | 60 | 6/6 | 100 | 3 | 2 | 5 | 2 | 4 | 1 | 2 | 0 | 12 |
| 11 | Anton Ponomarev | 26 | 1/8 | 12.5 | 0/5 | 0 | 1/2 | 50 | 4 | 4 | 8 | 1 | 5 | 3 | 0 | 0 | 4 |
| 12 | Dmitriy Klimov | 22 | 2/6 | 33.33 | 1/2 | 50 | 0/0 | 0 | 1 | 4 | 5 | 0 | 4 | 1 | 2 | 0 | 5 |
| 13 | Rustam Yargaliyev | 33 | 7/14 | 50 | 2/4 | 50 | 0/0 | 0 | 1 | 4 | 5 | 1 | 4 | 4 | 0 | 1 | 19 |
| 14 | Leonid Bondarovich | 3 | 0/2 | 0 | 0/2 | 0 | 0/0 | 0 | 0 | 0 | 0 | 0 | 0 | 0 | 0 | 0 | 0 |
| 15 | Alexander Zhigulin | 6 | 0/1 | 0 | 0/1 | 0 | 0/0 | 0 | 0 | 1 | 1 | 0 | 4 | 0 | 0 | 0 | 0 |
| Totals | | 200 | 23/73 | 31.51 | 14/39 | 35.90 | 24/31 | 77.42 | 19 | 28 | 47 | 15 | 32 | 14 | 7 | 1 | 79 |

Bahrain
| # | Player | Min | FG | | 2FG | | FT | | REB | | | AST | PF | TO | STL | BS | Pts |
| # | Player | Min | M/A | % | M/A | % | M/A | % | OFF | DEF | TOT | AST | PF | TO | STL | BS | Pts |
|---|---|---|---|---|---|---|---|---|---|---|---|---|---|---|---|---|---|
| 4 | Mohamed Ebrahim | 3 | 0/1 | 0 | 0/0 | 0 | 0/0 | 0 | 0 | 0 | 0 | 0 | 0 | 1 | 1 | 0 | 0 |
| 5 | Hussain Al-Tawash | 18 | 0/5 | 0 | 0/2 | 0 | 0/0 | 0 | 0 | 1 | 1 | 1 | 2 | 3 | 0 | 0 | 0 |
| 6 | Mohamed Kawaid | 28 | 2/5 | 40 | 0/1 | 0 | 6/8 | 75 | 0 | 2 | 2 | 3 | 5 | 3 | 1 | 0 | 12 |
| 7 | Bader Malabes | 35 | 3/10 | 30 | 1/7 | 14.28 | 6/6 | 100 | 0 | 5 | 5 | 2 | 2 | 2 | 0 | 0 | 14 |
| 8 | Ahmed Ismaeel | 30 | 4/7 | 57.14 | 4/5 | 80 | 6/7 | 85.71 | 0 | 2 | 2 | 1 | 3 | 2 | 0 | 0 | 14 |
| 9 | Mohamed Alderazi | 38 | 3/10 | 30 | 2/5 | 40 | 3/3 | 100 | 1 | 4 | 5 | 2 | 2 | 3 | 2 | 0 | 10 |
| 10 | Ahmed Alderazi | Did not play | | | | | | | | | | | | | | | |
| 11 | Subah Azzam | 15 | 3/3 | 100 | 2/2 | 100 | 0/0 | 0 | 1 | 3 | 4 | 1 | 1 | 2 | 0 | 0 | 7 |
| 12 | Chester Giles | 28 | 3/10 | 30 | 3/10 | 30 | 6/8 | 75 | 2 | 10 | 12 | 0 | 5 | 3 | 0 | 2 | 12 |
| 13 | Yunes Kawaid | 11 | 0/1 | 0 | 0/1 | 0 | 1/2 | 50 | 0 | 1 | 1 | 1 | 2 | 3 | 0 | 0 | 1 |
| 14 | Ahmed Akber | 14 | 2/3 | 66.67 | 2/3 | 66.67 | 2/3 | 66.67 | 2 | 0 | 2 | 0 | 3 | 0 | 0 | 0 | 6 |
| 15 | Ahmed Aman | Did not play | | | | | | | | | | | | | | | |
| Totals | | 200 | 20/55 | 36.36 | 14/36 | 38.89 | 30/37 | 81.08 | 6 | 28 | 34 | 11 | 25 | 22 | 4 | 2 | 76 |

=== Thailand vs. India ===
2 August 2013
22:30

Report

| Thailand | 65–89 | India |
Scoring by quarter: 13–27, 17–19, 15–21, 20–22
| Pts: Dg. Apiromvilaichai 10; Rebs: Dg. Apiromvilaichai 6 Asts: Kongkum, Ghogar 3 | | Pts: Grewal 24; Rebs: Y. Singh 9 Asts: J. Singh 4 |

Mall of Asia Arena, Pasay
Referees: Amirhossein Safarzadeh (IRI), Glenn Cornelio (PHI), Jassim Abdullah(QAT)

Thailand
| # | Player | Min | FG | | 2FG | | FT | | REB | | | AST | PF | TO | STL | BS | Pts |
| # | Player | Min | M/A | % | M/A | % | M/A | % | OFF | DEF | TOT | AST | PF | TO | STL | BS | Pts |
|---|---|---|---|---|---|---|---|---|---|---|---|---|---|---|---|---|---|
| 4 | Chanachon Klahan | 9 | 2/7 | 28.57 | 0/3 | 0 | 3/5 | 60 | 1 | 1 | 2 | 0 | 1 | 1 | 0 | 0 | 9 |
| 5 | Attaporn Lertmalaiporn | 18 | 2/4 | 50 | 0/1 | 0 | 0/0 | 0 | 0 | 2 | 2 | 1 | 0 | 1 | 1 | 0 | 6 |
| 6 | Wattana Suttisin | 17 | 2/5 | 40 | 2/5 | 0 | 3/6 | 50 | 2 | 3 | 5 | 2 | 5 | 1 | 3 | 0 | 7 |
| 7 | Danai Kongkum | 22 | 4/10 | 40 | 4/8 | 50 | 0/0 | 0 | 1 | 2 | 3 | 3 | 4 | 4 | 0 | 0 | 8 |
| 8 | Wutipong Dasom | 14 | 2/4 | 50 | 2/4 | 50 | 0/0 | 0 | 2 | 1 | 3 | 0 | 1 | 3 | 0 | 0 | 4 |
| 9 | Anasawee Klaewnarong | 10 | 1/3 | 33.33 | 1/3 | 33.33 | 0/0 | 0 | 0 | 2 | 2 | 0 | 4 | 3 | 0 | 0 | 2 |
| 10 | Darongpan Apiromvilaichai | 14 | 3/7 | 42.86 | 3/7 | 42.86 | 0/1 | 0 | 1 | 1 | 2 | 0 | 0 | 5 | 0 | 0 | 6 |
| 11 | Darunpong Apiromvilaichai | 26 | 4/10 | 40 | 3/8 | 37.5 | 1/2 | 50 | 2 | 4 | 6 | 1 | 1 | 0 | 0 | 3 | 10 |
| 12 | Sukhdave Ghogar | 14 | 1/2 | 50 | 1/2 | 50 | 0/0 | 0 | 1 | 1 | 2 | 3 | 1 | 1 | 0 | 0 | 2 |
| 13 | Kannawat Lertlaokul | 17 | 2/7 | 28.57 | 2/4 | 50 | 0/0 | 0 | 2 | 3 | 5 | 1 | 1 | 1 | 0 | 2 | 4 |
| 14 | Kannut Samerjai | 3 | 0/0 | 0 | 0 | 0 | 0 | 0 | 0 | 0 | 0 | 0 | 0 | 0 | 0 | 0 | 0 |
| 15 | Wacharapong Tongsri | 30 | 3/9 | 33.33 | 3/9 | 33.33 | 1/2 | 50 | 1 | 3 | 4 | 0 | 3 | 0 | 0 | 0 | 7 |
| Totals | | 200 | 26.68 | 38.24 | 21/54 | 38.89 | 8/16 | 50 | 13 | 23 | 36 | 11 | 21 | 20 | 4 | 5 | 65 |

India
| # | Player | Min | FG | | 2FG | | FT | | REB | | | AST | PF | TO | STL | BS | Pts |
| # | Player | Min | M/A | % | M/A | % | M/A | % | OFF | DEF | TOT | AST | PF | TO | STL | BS | Pts |
|---|---|---|---|---|---|---|---|---|---|---|---|---|---|---|---|---|---|
| 4 | Sambhaji Kadam | 7 | 0/0 | 0 | 0/0 | 0 | 0/0 | 0 | 2 | 0 | 2 | 0 | 0 | 0 | 0 | 0 | 0 |
| 5 | Narender Kumar Grewal | 30 | 10/20 | 50 | 9/16 | 56.25 | 3/5 | 60 | 4 | 2 | 6 | 1 | 2 | 1 | 0 | 0 | 24 |
| 6 | Pratham Singh | 6 | 0/0 | 0 | 0/0 | 0 | 1/2 | 50 | 1 | 1 | 2 | 0 | 1 | 0 | 0 | 0 | 1 |
| 7 | Vinay Kaushik | 8 | 1/3 | 33.33 | 0/1 | 0 | 0/0 | 0 | 1 | 0 | 1 | 1 | 1 | 1 | 0 | 0 | 3 |
| 8 | Arjun Singh | 3 | 0/2 | 0 | 0/2 | 0 | 1/4 | 25 | 2 | 1 | 3 | 1 | 0 | 1 | 0 | 0 | 1 |
| 9 | Vishesh Bhriguvanshi | 33 | 9/22 | 40.91 | 8/16 | 50 | 1/2 | 50 | 3 | 5 | 8 | 1 | 1 | 2 | 1 | 0 | 20 |
| 10 | Amritpal Singh | 15 | 3/7 | 42.86 | 3/6 | 50 | 3/4 | 75 | 2 | 5 | 7 | 1 | 3 | 2 | 0 | 0 | 9 |
| 11 | Joginder Singh | 29 | 4/10 | 40 | 1/2 | 50 | 2/2 | 100 | 1 | 3 | 4 | 4 | 2 | 1 | 2 | 0 | 13 |
| 12 | Satnam Singh Bhamara | 7 | 2/5 | 40 | 2/4 | 50 | 2/2 | 100 | 2 | 2 | 4 | 0 | 1 | 1 | 0 | 0 | 6 |
| 13 | Amjyot Singh | 18 | 2/2 | 100 | 2/2 | 100 | 4/6 | 66.67 | 3 | 5 | 8 | 0 | 3 | 5 | 0 | 2 | 8 |
| 14 | Yadwinder Singh | 23 | 1/5 | 20 | 1/5 | 20 | 0/0 | 0 | 5 | 4 | 9 | 0 | 3 | 2 | 1 | 1 | 2 |
| 15 | Rikin Shantilal Pethani | 17 | 1/5 | 20 | 1/5 | 20 | 0/2 | 0 | 2 | 4 | 6 | 1 | 1 | 3 | 0 | 3 | 2 |
| Totals | | 200 | 33/81 | 40.74 | 27/59 | 45.76 | 17/29 | 58.62 | 28 | 32 | 60 | 10 | 18 | 19 | 4 | 6 | 89 |

== August 3 ==
=== India vs. Kazakhstan ===
3 August 2013
13:15

Report

| India | 67–80 | Kazakhstan |
Scoring by quarter: 19–20, 19–23, 10–24, 19–13
| Pts: Bhriguvanshi 19; Rebs: Bhriguvanshi 6 Asts: Bhriguvanshi 5 | | Pts: Yevstigneyev 21; Rebs: Ponomarev 7 Asts: Johnson 6 |

Mall of Asia Arena, Pasay
Referees: Wang Mei (CHN), Jassim Abdullah (QAT), Toru Katayose (JPN)

India
| # | Player | Min | FG | | 2FG | | FT | | REB | | | AST | PF | TO | STL | BS | Pts |
| # | Player | Min | M/A | % | M/A | % | M/A | % | OFF | DEF | TOT | AST | PF | TO | STL | BS | Pts |
|---|---|---|---|---|---|---|---|---|---|---|---|---|---|---|---|---|---|
| 4 | Sambhaji Kadam | Did not play | | | | | | | | | | | | | | | |
| 5 | Narender Kumar Grewal | 37 | 6/14 | 42.86 | 4/8 | 50 | 0/0 | 0 | 1 | 2 | 3 | 1 | 2 | 2 | 0 | 0 | 14 |
| 6 | Pratham Singh | 10 | 1/1 | 100 | 1/1 | 100 | 0/0 | 0 | 0 | 0 | 0 | 0 | 1 | 1 | 1 | 0 | 2 |
| 7 | Vinay Kaushik | Did not play | | | | | | | | | | | | | | | |
| 8 | Arjun Singh | 6 | 0/1 | 0 | 0/0 | 0 | 1/2 | 50 | 1 | 1 | 2 | 1 | 0 | 1 | 0 | 0 | 1 |
| 9 | Vishesh Bhriguvanshi | 37 | 7/11 | 63.64 | 4/7 | 57.14 | 2/3 | 66.67 | 0 | 6 | 6 | 5 | 4 | 2 | 0 | 0 | 19 |
| 10 | Amritpal Singh | 22 | 1/4 | 25 | 1/4 | 25 | 2/4 | 50 | 1 | 3 | 4 | 0 | 4 | 3 | 0 | 3 | 4 |
| 11 | Joginder Singh | 27 | 4/8 | 50 | 3/4 | 75 | 1/2 | 50 | 2 | 3 | 5 | 1 | 1 | 6 | 0 | 0 | 10 |
| 12 | Satnam Singh Bhamara | 10 | 4/5 | 80 | 4/5 | 80 | 0/1 | 0 | 2 | 2 | 4 | 0 | 2 | 0 | 0 | 0 | 8 |
| 13 | Amjyot Singh | 30 | 2/6 | 33.33 | 2/6 | 33.33 | 1/2 | 50 | 5 | 0 | 5 | 1 | 4 | 4 | 0 | 2 | 5 |
| 14 | Yadwinder Singh | 10 | 1/3 | 33.33 | 1/1 | 100 | 2/2 | 100 | 0 | 2 | 2 | 1 | 1 | 1 | 0 | 0 | 4 |
| 15 | Rikin Shantilal Pethani | 6 | 0/1 | 0 | 0/1 | 0 | 0/0 | 0 | 0 | 0 | 0 | 0 | 0 | 0 | 0 | 0 | 0 |
| Totals | | 200 | 26/54 | 48.15 | 20/37 | 54.05 | 9/16 | 56.25 | 12 | 19 | 31 | 10 | 19 | 20 | 1 | 5 | 67 |

Kazakhstan
| # | Player | Min | FG | | 2FG | | FT | | REB | | | AST | PF | TO | STL | BS | Pts |
| # | Player | Min | M/A | % | M/A | % | M/A | % | OFF | DEF | TOT | AST | PF | TO | STL | BS | Pts |
|---|---|---|---|---|---|---|---|---|---|---|---|---|---|---|---|---|---|
| 4 | Timur Sultanov | 16 | 0/2 | 0 | 0/0 | 0 | 0/0 | 0 | 0 | 2 | 2 | 2 | 2 | 0 | 1 | 0 | 0 |
| 5 | Jerry Johnson | 30 | 6/12 | 50 | 4/7 | 57.14 | 2/2 | 100 | 2 | 2 | 4 | 6 | 1 | 2 | 1 | 0 | 19 |
| 6 | Rustam Murzagaliyev | 13 | 0/1 | 0 | 0/1 | 0 | 0/0 | 0 | 1 | 1 | 2 | 3 | 2 | 0 | 0 | 0 | 0 |
| 7 | Mikhail Yevstigneyev | 18 | 7/11 | 63.64 | 6/9 | 66.67 | 6/7 | 85.71 | 2 | 2 | 4 | 0 | 5 | 3 | 1 | 0 | 21 |
| 8 | Vitaliy Lapchenko | 20 | 4/8 | 50 | 4/8 | 50 | 0/0 | 0 | 2 | 1 | 3 | 0 | 2 | 1 | 1 | 0 | 8 |
| 9 | Nikolay Bazhkin | Did not play | | | | | | | | | | | | | | | |
| 10 | Konstantin Dvirnyy | Did not play | | | | | | | | | | | | | | | |
| 11 | Anton Ponomarev | 25 | 2/9 | 22.22 | 1/6 | 16.67 | 6/8 | 75 | 4 | 3 | 7 | 0 | 1 | 1 | 0 | 1 | 11 |
| 12 | Dmitriy Klimov | 26 | 3/11 | 27.28 | 3/7 | 42.86 | 0/0 | 0 | 3 | 2 | 5 | 4 | 1 | 2 | 1 | 0 | 6 |
| 13 | Rustam Yargaliyev | 32 | 6/11 | 54.55 | 5/9 | 55.56 | 0/0 | 0 | 1 | 2 | 3 | 3 | 0 | 3 | 1 | 0 | 13 |
| 14 | Leonid Bondarovich | 8 | 1/3 | 33 | 1/3 | 33 | 0/0 | 0 | 1 | 2 | 3 | 0 | 3 | 0 | 0 | 0 | 2 |
| 15 | Alexander Zhigulin | 7 | 1/2 | 50 | 0/0 | 0 | 0/0 | 0 | 1 | 0 | 1 | 1 | 1 | 0 | 0 | 0 | 3 |
| Totals | | 200 | 30/70 | 42.86 | 24/50 | 48 | 14/17 | 82.35 | 17 | 17 | 34 | 19 | 18 | 12 | 6 | 1 | 80 |

=== Bahrain vs. Thailand ===
3 August 2013
18:00

Report

| Bahrain | 86–62 | Thailand |
Scoring by quarter: 21–18, 22–17, 19–11, 24–16
| Pts: Alderazi 21; Rebs: Giles 18; Asts: four players 3 | | Pts: Lertmalaiporn, Lertlaokul 11; Rebs: Dg. Apiromvilaichai 7 Asts: Dasom 3 |

Ninoy Aquino Stadium, Manila
Referees: Ricor Buaron (PHI), Chen Ying-Cheng (TPE), Cheung Kwok Shun Andy (HKG)

Bahrain
| # | Player | Min | FG | | 2FG | | FT | | REB | | | AST | PF | TO | STL | BS | Pts |
| # | Player | Min | M/A | % | M/A | % | M/A | % | OFF | DEF | TOT | AST | PF | TO | STL | BS | Pts |
|---|---|---|---|---|---|---|---|---|---|---|---|---|---|---|---|---|---|
| 4 | Mohamed Ebrahim | Did not play | | | | | | | | | | | | | | | |
| 5 | Hussain Al-Tawash | 22 | 4/8 | 50 | 4/7 | 57.14 | 3/3 | 100 | 1 | 3 | 4 | 3 | 1 | 0 | 1 | 0 | 11 |
| 6 | Mohamed Kawaid | 11 | 0/2 | 0 | 0/2 | 0 | 0/0 | 0 | 0 | 0 | 0 | 2 | 1 | 0 | 1 | 0 | 0 |
| 7 | Bader Malabes | 21 | 0/4 | 0 | 0/2 | 0 | 0/0 | 0 | 0 | 4 | 4 | 2 | 3 | 2 | 0 | 0 | 0 |
| 8 | Ahmed Ismaeel | 30 | 4/10 | 40 | 3/6 | 50 | 2/3 | 66.67 | 0 | 0 | 0 | 3 | 3 | 2 | 0 | 0 | 11 |
| 9 | Mohamed Alderazi | 32 | 8/14 | 57.14 | 5/8 | 62.5 | 2/2 | 100 | 0 | 3 | 3 | 3 | 1 | 5 | 1 | 0 | 21 |
| 10 | Ahmed ALderazi | Did not play | | | | | | | | | | | | | | | |
| 11 | Subah Azzam | 14 | 2/2 | 100 | 2/2 | 100 | 0/0 | 0 | 1 | 5 | 6 | 0 | 5 | 0 | 0 | 0 | 4 |
| 12 | Chester Giles | 22 | 4/9 | 44.44 | 4/9 | 44.44 | 10/13 | 76.92 | 7 | 11 | 18 | 0 | 2 | 4 | 0 | 0 | 18 |
| 13 | Yunes Kawaid | 11 | 0/2 | 0 | 0/2 | 0 | 0/0 | 0 | 0 | 0 | 0 | 2 | 1 | 0 | 1 | 0 | 0 |
| 14 | Ahmed Akber | 17 | 4/4 | 100 | 4/4 | 100 | 1/2 | 50 | 3 | 0 | 3 | 0 | 3 | 2 | 0 | 1 | 9 |
| 15 | Ahmed Aman | Did not play | | | | | | | | | | | | | | | |
| Totals | | 200 | 30/61 | 49.18 | 26/46 | 56.52 | 22/27 | 81.48 | 12 | 32 | 44 | 16 | 20 | 17 | 3 | 3 | 86 |

Thailand
| # | Player | Min | FG | | 2FG | | FT | | REB | | | AST | PF | TO | STL | BS | Pts |
| # | Player | Min | M/A | % | M/A | % | M/A | % | OFF | DEF | TOT | AST | PF | TO | STL | BS | Pts |
|---|---|---|---|---|---|---|---|---|---|---|---|---|---|---|---|---|---|
| 4 | Chanachon Klahan | 14 | 0/4 | 0 | 0/0 | 0 | 3/5 | 60 | 0 | 1 | 1 | 0 | 1 | 0 | 0 | 0 | 3 |
| 5 | Attaporn Lertmalaiporn | 28 | 4/9 | 44.44 | 1/3 | 33.33 | 0/0 | 0 | 0 | 4 | 4 | 1 | 1 | 1 | 1 | 0 | 11 |
| 6 | Wattana Suttisin | Did not play | | | | | | | | | | | | | | | |
| 7 | Danai Kongkum | 13 | 1/4 | 25 | 1/4 | 25 | 0/0 | 0 | 0 | 0 | 0 | 1 | 1 | 2 | 2 | 0 | 2 |
| 8 | Wutipong Dasom | 28 | 2/7 | 28.57 | 2/7 | 28.57 | 1/2 | 50 | 1 | 0 | 1 | 3 | 3 | 1 | 1 | 0 | 5 |
| 9 | Anasawee Klaewnarong | 21 | 3/9 | 33.33 | 2/4 | 50 | 2/2 | 100 | 1 | 5 | 6 | 0 | 4 | 3 | 1 | 2 | 9 |
| 10 | Darongpan Apiromvilaichai | 21 | 1/5 | 20 | 1/3 | 33.33 | 3/5 | 60 | 2 | 1 | 3 | 0 | 1 | 0 | 0 | 0 | 5 |
| 11 | Darunpong Apiromvilaichai | 22 | 1/13 | 7.69 | 0/6 | 0 | 3/4 | 75 | 4 | 3 | 7 | 1 | 1 | 1 | 0 | 0 | 6 |
| 12 | Sukhdave Ghogar | 12 | 2/5 | 40 | 2/4 | 50 | 0/0 | 0 | 3 | 2 | 5 | 1 | 4 | 0 | 0 | 0 | 4 |
| 13 | Kannawat Lertlaokul | 12 | 4/5 | 80 | 4/5 | 80 | 3/6 | 50 | 2 | 0 | 2 | 1 | 3 | 0 | 1 | 0 | 11 |
| 14 | Kannut Samerjai | 2 | 0/1 | 0 | 0/1 | 0 | 0/0 | 0 | 0 | 0 | 0 | 0 | 0 | 0 | 0 | 0 | 0 |
| 15 | Wacharapong Tongsri | 21 | 2/6 | 33.33 | 2/6 | 33.33 | 2/2 | 100 | 1 | 3 | 4 | 1 | 1 | 0 | 0 | 0 | 6 |
| Totals | | 200 | 20/68 | 29.41 | 15/43 | 34.88 | 17/26 | 65.38 | 14 | 19 | 33 | 9 | 20 | 8 | 6 | 2 | 62 |
