= Basketball at the 2018 Asian Games – Men's tournament =

Asian Games

Men at the 2018 Asian Games
- Venues: Gelora Bung Karno Basketball Hall; Istora Gelora Bung Karno
- Dates: 14 August – 1 September 2018
- Competitors: 156 from 13 nations

Medalists
gold medal	China
silver medal	Iran
bronze medal	South Korea

The men's 5-on-5 basketball tournament at the 2018 Asian Games was held in Jakarta, Indonesia from 14 August to 1 September 2018.

== Squads ==
China	Chinese Taipei	Hong Kong	Indonesia
Tian Yuxiang; Fang Shuo; Zhao Tailong; Yu Changdong; Ding Yanyuhang; Zhao Rui; Liu Zhixuan; Zhou Qi; Dong Hanlin; Sun Minghui; Abdusalam Abdurixit; Wang Zhelin	Peng Chun-yen; Chou Yi-hsiang; Liu Cheng; Chou Po-chen; Chen Ying-chun; Hu Long-mao; Huang Tsung-han; Chiang Yu-an; Chen Kuan-chuan; Lin Chih-wei; Douglas Creighton; Huang Jhen	Cheng Ho Hang; Leung Shiu Wah; Lam Hoi Kwong; Lau Tsz Lai; Ricky Yang; Cheng Kam Hing; Adam Xu; Chow Ka Kui; Tsai Choi Kwan; Wu Cheuk Pan; Szeto Wai Kit; Au Yeung Wai Kong	Kaleb Ramot Gemilang; Abraham Damar Grahita; Andakara Prastawa; Sandy Febiansyakh Kurniawan; Kevin Sitorus; Muhammad Dhiyaul Haq; Ponsianus Nyoman Indrawan; Adhi Pratama Prasetyo; Valentino Wuwungan; Xaverius Prawiro; Arki Dikania Wisnu; Jamarr Johnson
Iran	Japan	Kazakhstan	Mongolia
Meisam Mirzaei; Sajjad Mashayekhi; Aren Davoudi; Behnam Yakhchali; Vahid Dalirzahan; Rouzbeh Arghavan; Mohammad Jamshidi; Samad Nikkhah Bahrami; Hamed Haddadi; Navid Rezaeifar; Arsalan Kazemi; Mohammad Hassanzadeh	Naoto Tsuji; Taichi Nakamura; Atsuya Ota; Leo Vendrame; Takuya Hashimoto; Naoya Kumagae; Keita Imamura; Avi Schafer; Takuma Sato; Yuya Nagayoshi; Shogo Tamaki; Tenketsu Harimoto	Azim Yagodkin; Shaim Kuanov; Nikolay Bazhin; Vadim Chsherbak; Rustam Murzagaliyev; Aimurat Satkeyev; Rustam Yergali; Askar Maidekin; Alexandr Zhigulin; Anton Bykov; Dmitriy Gavrilov; Maxim Marchuk	Bat-Erdeniin Boldbaatar; Otgonbaataryn Sergelen; Ariunboldyn Anand; Ochbadrakhyn Dölgöön; Battulgyn Batjavkhlan; Tungalagiin Sanchir; Battüvshingiin Bilgüün; Davaadorjiin Mönkhtüvshin; Pürevjavyn Bolortulga; Narangereliin Batbayar; Ochirbatyn Erdenetsogt; Otgonbayaryn Ochirbat
Philippines	Qatar	South Korea	Syria
Paul Lee; Gabe Norwood; Jordan Clarkson; Poy Erram; Stanley Pringle; Maverick Ahanmisi; Chris Tiu; James Yap; Raymond Almazan; Beau Belga; Christian Standhardinger; Asi Taulava	Mizo Amin; Mohamed Abdelaziz; Moustafa Lashin; Tanguy Ngombo; Mohammed Yousuf; Abdulrahim Abuissa; Khalid Suliman; Khaled Abdelbaset; Emir Mujkić; Nasser Al-Rayes; Faris Avdić; Abdelrahman Abdelhaleem	Kim Jun-il; Park Chan-hee; Choi Jun-yong; Lee Jung-hyun; Kim Sun-hyung; Heo Hoon; Heo Ung; Heo Il-young; Kang Sang-jae; Jeon Jun-beom; Ra Gun-ah; Lee Seoung-hyun	Khalil Khouri; Anthouny Bakar; Ahmad Khyyata; Tarek Al-Jabi; Jamil Saddir; Abdulwahab Al-Hamwi; Sharif Al-Osh; Omar Idelbi; Ammar Al-Ghamian; Omar Al-Shaikh; Muhieddin Kasaballi; Nazem Kassas
Thailand			
Eaktanat To-ngiw; Sorot Sunthonsiri; Suppawich Khukhandhin; Nakorn Jaisanuk; Sirapong Boonyai; Bandit Lakhan; Tawatchai Suktub; Anasawee Klaewnarong; Patiphan Klahan; Arnat Phuangla; Attapong Leelaphipatkul; Chitchai Ananti			

== Results ==
All times are Western Indonesia Time (UTC+07:00)

=== Preliminary ===
==== Group A ====
Pos	Team	Pld	W	L	PF	PA	PD	Pts	Qualification
1	South Korea	3	3	0	329	215	+114	6	Quarterfinals
2	Indonesia	3	1	2	232	264	−32	4 (Note: Tied on head-to-head wins (1). Head-to-head game points difference: INA +7, MGL +4, THA −11.)	Quarterfinals
3	Mongolia	3	1	2	233	264	−31	4	
4	Thailand	3	1	2	250	301	−51	4	

Source: OCA
Notes:

14 August
12:30

Thailand	87–86	Mongolia
Scoring by quarter: 26–14, 19–29, 23–19, 19–24
Pts: Klahan 18; Rebs: Klaewnarong, Klahan 10; Asts: Lakhan, Ananti 7		Pts: Sanchir 25; Rebs: Sanchir 13; Asts: Sergelen 6

Gelora Bung Karno Basketball Hall, Jakarta
Referees: Mohammad Doust (IRI), Kumiko Kumagai (JPN), Chen Ying-cheng (TPE)

14 August
18:30

Indonesia	65–104	South Korea
Scoring by quarter: 18–28, 13–25, 14–27, 20–24
Pts: Prastawa 20; Rebs: Johnson 8 Asts: Johnson 3		Pts: Ra 30; Rebs: Ra 19; Asts: Kim S. 7

Gelora Bung Karno Basketball Hall, Jakarta
Referees: Yuen Chun Yip (HKG), Hadi Salem (IRI), Anan Daraghma (PLE)

16 August
16:00

South Korea	108–73	Mongolia
Scoring by quarter: 26–15, 30–17, 23–24, 29–17
Pts: Heo I. 20; Rebs: Ra 14; Asts: Kim S. 6		Pts: Batbayar 15; Rebs: Bilgüün 6 Asts: Sanchir, Bilgüün, Batbayar 3

Gelora Bung Karno Basketball Hall, Jakarta
Referees: Imran Ali Baig (IND), Kumiko Kumagai (JPN), Chen Ying-cheng (TPE)

20 August
18:30

Indonesia	98–86	Thailand
Scoring by quarter: 30–29, 21–14, 21–23, 26–20
Pts: Johnson 28; Rebs: Johnson 16; Asts: Grahita, Prastawa 3		Pts: Jaisanuk 28; Rebs: Ananti 7 Asts: Lakhan 5

Gelora Bung Karno Basketball Hall, Jakarta
Referees: Yuen Chun Yip (HKG), Mohammad Doust (IRI), Kumiko Kumagai (JPN)

22 August
18:30

South Korea	117–77	Thailand
Scoring by quarter: 26–16, 36–20, 29–18, 26–23
Pts: Ra 21; Rebs: Kang, Lee S. 8 Asts: Park 7		Pts: Suktub 17; Rebs: Klahan, Ananti 6 Asts: Leelaphipatkul 6

Gelora Bung Karno Basketball Hall, Jakarta
Referees: Mohammad Doust (IRI), Chen Ying-cheng (TPE), Anan Daraghma (PLE)

25 August
18:30

Mongolia	74–69	Indonesia
Scoring by quarter: 14–18, 24–9, 21–23, 15–19
Pts: Sanchir 28; Rebs: Bolortulga 11; Asts: Sergelen, Sanchir 4		Pts: Wuwungan, Wisnu 15; Rebs: Johnson 15; Asts: Johnson 4

Gelora Bung Karno Basketball Hall, Jakarta
Referees: Yuen Chun Yip (HKG), Hadi Salem (IRI), Chen Ying-cheng (TPE)

==== Group B ====
Pos	Team	Pld	W	L	PF	PA	PD	Pts	Qualification
1	Iran	1	1	0	68	55	+13	2	Quarterfinals
2	Syria	1	0	1	55	68	−13	1	Quarterfinals

Source: OCA

25 August
10:00

Syria	55–68	Iran
Scoring by quarter: 9–16, 15–14, 14–22, 17–16
Pts: Al-Hamwi 19; Rebs: Al-Hamwi 10; Asts: Bakar, Saddir 3		Pts: Mashayekhi 17; Rebs: Haddadi, Kazemi 10; Asts: Mashayekhi 6

Gelora Bung Karno Basketball Hall, Jakarta
Referees: Ferdinand Pascual (PHI), Imran Ali Baig (IND), Budi Marfan (INA)

==== Group C ====
Pos	Team	Pld	W	L	PF	PA	PD	Pts	Qualification
1	Chinese Taipei	3	3	0	252	202	+50	6	Quarterfinals
2	Japan	3	2	1	235	224	+11	5	Quarterfinals
3	Qatar	3	1	2	231	245	−14	4	
4	Hong Kong	3	0	3	229	276	−47	3	

Source: OCA

14 August
10:00

Chinese Taipei	71–65	Japan
Scoring by quarter: 11–17, 19–20, 29–16, 12–12
Pts: Chen Y. 18; Rebs: Liu 9 Asts: Chen Y. 5		Pts: Harimoto 12; Rebs: Sato 8 Asts: Vendrame 6

Gelora Bung Karno Basketball Hall, Jakarta
Referees: Harja Jaladri (INA), Alexey Stepanenko (KAZ), Preeda Muongmee (THA)

14 August
16:00

Hong Kong	80–90	Qatar
Scoring by quarter: 16–27, 16–24, 16–22, 32–17
Pts: Lau 21; Rebs: Szeto 13; Asts: Szeto 7		Pts: Suliman 19; Rebs: Yousuf 10; Asts: Suliman 7

Gelora Bung Karno Basketball Hall, Jakarta
Referees: Kim Jong-kuk (KOR), Haryanto Sutaryo (INA), Imran Ali Baig (IND)

16 August
18:30

Japan	82–71	Qatar
Scoring by quarter: 17–23, 22–14, 22–18, 21–16
Pts: Hashimoto 22; Rebs: Schafer 7 Asts: Hashimoto 4		Pts: Ngombo 36; Rebs: Yousuf, Suliman 6 Asts: Suliman 6

Gelora Bung Karno Basketball Hall, Jakarta
Referees: Ferdinand Pascual (PHI), Yevgeniy Mikheyev (KAZ), Kim Jong-kuk (KOR)

20 August
16:00

Chinese Taipei	98–67	Hong Kong
Scoring by quarter: 24–13, 21–10, 30–19, 23–25
Pts: Liu 21; Rebs: Liu 8 Asts: Chou Y. 5		Pts: Xu 16; Rebs: Szeto 8 Asts: Szeto 5

Gelora Bung Karno Basketball Hall, Jakarta
Referees: Harja Jaladri (INA), Yevgeniy Mikheyev (KAZ), Zhu Duan (CHN)

22 August
16:00

Japan	88–82	Hong Kong
Scoring by quarter: 22–19, 20–22, 28–20, 18–21
Pts: Ota 19; Rebs: Ota 10; Asts: Vendrame 8		Pts: Leung 35; Rebs: Szeto 16; Asts: Yang 6

Gelora Bung Karno Basketball Hall, Jakarta
Referees: Budi Marfan (INA), Johan Christiana (INA), Haryanto Sutaryo (INA)

25 August
16:00

Qatar	70–83	Chinese Taipei
Scoring by quarter: 13–24, 22–15, 17–13, 18–31
Pts: Suliman, Al-Rayes 13; Rebs: Al-Rayes 9 Asts: Avdić 5		Pts: Chen Y. 20; Rebs: Chou P., Chen K. 8 Asts: Chen Y. 5

Gelora Bung Karno Basketball Hall, Jakarta
Referees: Harja Jaladri (INA), Yevgeniy Mikheyev (KAZ), Preeda Muongmee (THA)

==== Group D ====
Pos	Team	Pld	W	L	PF	PA	PD	Pts	Qualification
1	China	2	2	0	165	146	+19	4	Quarterfinals
2	Philippines	2	1	1	176	141	+35	3	Quarterfinals
3	Kazakhstan	2	0	2	125	179	−54	2	

Source: OCA

16 August
10:00

Kazakhstan	59–96	Philippines
Scoring by quarter: 9–16, 11–25, 23–20, 16–35
Pts: Bykov 13; Rebs: Gavrilov 8 Asts: Murzagaliyev 6		Pts: Pringle 18; Rebs: Almazan 8 Asts: Tiu 5

Gelora Bung Karno Basketball Hall, Jakarta
Referees: Yuen Chun Yip (HKG), Mohammad Doust (IRI), Jun Horiuchi (JPN)

21 August
16:00

Philippines	80–82	China
Scoring by quarter: 12–20, 19–16, 26–23, 23–23
Pts: Clarkson 28; Rebs: Clarkson, Standhardinger 8 Asts: Clarkson 4		Pts: Zhou 25; Rebs: Zhou 12; Asts: Liu, Sun 5

Gelora Bung Karno Basketball Hall, Jakarta
Referees: Yuen Chun Yip (HKG), Hadi Salem (IRI), Imran Ali Baig (IND)

23 August
16:00

Kazakhstan	66–83	China
Scoring by quarter: 18–26, 19–12, 12–31, 17–14
Pts: Yergali 15; Rebs: Bazhin, Bykov, Marchuk 6 Asts: Yergali 7		Pts: Liu 18; Rebs: Abdusalam 11; Asts: Liu 6

Gelora Bung Karno Basketball Hall, Jakarta
Referees: Mohammad Doust (IRI), Imran Ali Baig (IND), Anan Daraghma (PLE)

=== Final round ===
Quarterfinals
27 August
South Korea	91
Philippines	82
27 August
Iran	93
Japan	67
27 August
Chinese Taipei	82
Syria	75
27 August
China	98
Indonesia	63

Semifinals
30 August
South Korea	68
Iran	80
30 August
Chinese Taipei	63
China	86

Gold medal game
1 September
Iran	72
China	84
Bronze medal game
1 September
South Korea	89
Chinese Taipei	81

Classification 5–8
28 August
Philippines	113
Japan	80
28 August
Syria	76
Indonesia	66

Classification 5th–6th
31 August
Philippines	109
Syria	55
Classification 7th–8th
31 August
Japan	84
Indonesia	66

==== Quarterfinals ====
27 August
10:00

South Korea	91–82	Philippines
Scoring by quarter: 22–18, 20–26, 22–21, 27–17
Pts: Ra 30; Rebs: Ra 14; Asts: Kim S. 10		Pts: Clarkson 25; Rebs: Standhardinger 9 Asts: Lee 5

Gelora Bung Karno Basketball Hall, Jakarta
Referees: Yuen Chun Yip (HKG), Alexey Stepanenko (KAZ), Imran Ali Baig (IND)

27 August
12:30

Iran	93–67	Japan
Scoring by quarter: 25–14, 17–21, 25–19, 26–13
Pts: Haddadi 22; Rebs: Haddadi 15; Asts: Nikkhah, Kazemi 4		Pts: Kumagae 14; Rebs: Tsuji, Ota 5 Asts: Nakamura 7

Gelora Bung Karno Basketball Hall, Jakarta
Referees: Harja Jaladri (INA), Preeda Muongmee (THA), Chen Ying-cheng (TPE)

27 August
16:00

Chinese Taipei	82–75	Syria
Scoring by quarter: 24–19, 17–22, 16–17, 25–17
Pts: Chen Y. 24; Rebs: Chou P. 7 Asts: Creighton 4		Pts: Al-Jabi 28; Rebs: Al-Hamwi 11; Asts: Al-Hamwi 5

Gelora Bung Karno Basketball Hall, Jakarta
Referees: Ferdinand Pascual (PHI), Kumiko Kumagai (JPN), Hadi Salem (IRI)

27 August
18:30

China	98–63	Indonesia
Scoring by quarter: 26–13, 27–15, 27–16, 18–19
Pts: Abdusalam 24; Rebs: Abdusalam 10; Asts: Fang, Zhao R., Sun 4		Pts: Johnson 20; Rebs: Johnson 9 Asts: Johnson 4

Gelora Bung Karno Basketball Hall, Jakarta
Referees: Mohammad Doust (IRI), Snehal Bendke (IND), Kim Jong-kuk (KOR)

==== Classification 5–8 ====
28 August
16:00

Philippines	113–80	Japan
Scoring by quarter: 27–27, 30–20, 25–17, 31–16
Pts: Standhardinger 27; Rebs: Standhardinger 13; Asts: Clarkson 9		Pts: Nakamura 16; Rebs: Schafer 8 Asts: Nakamura 11

Gelora Bung Karno Basketball Hall, Jakarta
Referees: Yuen Chun Yip (HKG), Mohammad Doust (IRI), Kim Jong-kuk (KOR)

28 August
18:30

Syria	76–66	Indonesia
Scoring by quarter: 26–15, 26–9, 14–17, 10–25
Pts: Al-Jabi 33; Rebs: Al-Shaikh 11; Asts: Bakar, Al-Osh 4		Pts: Prawiro, Wisnu 14; Rebs: Johnson 7 Asts: Johnson 4

Gelora Bung Karno Basketball Hall, Jakarta
Referees: Hadi Salem (IRI), Alexey Stepanenko (KAZ), Imran Ali Baig (IND)

==== Semifinals ====
30 August
16:00

South Korea	68–80	Iran
Scoring by quarter: 14–21, 14–19, 20–23, 20–17
Pts: Ra 37; Rebs: Ra 12; Asts: Lee J. 7		Pts: Haddadi 23; Rebs: Hassanzadeh 11; Asts: Haddadi 8

Istora Gelora Bung Karno, Jakarta
Referees: Ferdinand Pascual (PHI), Alexey Stepanenko (KAZ), Jun Horiuchi (JPN)

30 August
18:30

Chinese Taipei	63–86	China
Scoring by quarter: 19–26, 11–11, 12–31, 21–18
Pts: Liu 24; Rebs: Liu, Lin 5 Asts: Liu, Chen Y., Lin 2		Pts: Zhou 22; Rebs: Zhou 16; Asts: Sun 6

Istora Gelora Bung Karno, Jakarta
Referees: Harja Jaladri (INA), Imran Ali Baig (IND), Anan Daraghma (PLE)

==== Classification 7th–8th ====
31 August
12:30

Japan	84–66	Indonesia
Scoring by quarter: 21–20, 18–12, 18–22, 27–12
Pts: Tsuji 29; Rebs: Ota 11; Asts: Harimoto 8		Pts: Johnson 23; Rebs: Johnson 12; Asts: Wisnu 6

Istora Gelora Bung Karno, Jakarta
Referees: Yuen Chun Yip (HKG), Kim Jong-kuk (KOR), Preeda Muongmee (THA)

==== Classification 5th–6th ====
31 August
18:30

Philippines	109–55	Syria
Scoring by quarter: 38–16, 22–18, 31–10, 18–11
Pts: Clarkson 29; Rebs: Standhardinger 15; Asts: Ahanmisi 7		Pts: Al-Jabi 23; Rebs: Al-Hamwi, Al-Osh 6 Asts: Al-Osh 4

Istora Gelora Bung Karno, Jakarta
Referees: Harja Jaladri (INA), Alexey Stepanenko (KAZ), Haryanto Sutaryo (INA)

==== Bronze medal game ====
1 September
12:30

South Korea	89–81	Chinese Taipei
Scoring by quarter: 21–11, 24–22, 27–20, 17–28
Pts: Ra 37; Rebs: Ra 17; Asts: Lee S. 15		Pts: Liu 25; Rebs: Liu 7 Asts: Chen Y. 7

Istora Gelora Bung Karno, Jakarta
Referees: Alexey Stepanenko (KAZ), Hadi Salem (IRI), Preeda Muongmee (THA)

==== Gold medal game ====
1 September
18:30

Iran	72–84	China
Scoring by quarter: 25–18, 20–23, 11–18, 16–25
Pts: Haddadi 27; Rebs: Haddadi 10; Asts: Nikkhah 8		Pts: Abdusalam 20; Rebs: Zhou 11; Asts: Fang 8

Istora Gelora Bung Karno, Jakarta
Referees: Ferdinand Pascual (PHI), Harja Jaladri (INA), Kim Jong-kuk (KOR)

== Final standing ==
Rank	Team	Pld	W	L
1st place, gold medalist(s)	China	5	5	0
2nd place, silver medalist(s)	Iran	4	3	1
3rd place, bronze medalist(s)	South Korea	6	5	1
4	Chinese Taipei	6	4	2
5	Philippines	5	3	2
6	Syria	4	1	3
7	Japan	6	3	3
8	Indonesia	6	1	5
9	Qatar	3	1	2
10	Mongolia	3	1	2
11	Kazakhstan	2	0	2
12	Thailand	3	1	2
13	Hong Kong	3	0	3
