= Basketball at the 2014 Asian Games – Men's tournament =

Men at the 2014 Asian Games
- Venue: Samsan World Gymnasium; Hwaseong Indoor Arena
- Date: 20 September – 3 October 2014
- Competitors: 188 from 16 nations

Medalists
gold medal	South Korea
silver medal	Iran
bronze medal	Japan

The men's tournament of the 2014 Asian Games Basketball Competition was held from 20 September to 3 October 2014 in Incheon, South Korea. China was the defending Gold medal winners of the competition in 2010, which they won in their home soil. South Korea emulated that feat by winning the Gold Medal in Incheon in 2014. Iran and Japan completed the podium by winning the Silver and Bronze medals, respectively. Games of the tournament were held at the 7,406 seat Samsan World Gymnasium, and the 5,158 seat Hwaseong Sports Complex.

== Squads ==
China	Chinese Taipei	Hong Kong	India
Liu Xiaoyu; Guo Ailun; Gu Quan; Zhou Qi; Zhao Tailong; Zhai Xiaochuan; Ding Yanyuhang; Zhou Peng; Xirelijiang Mugedaer; Sun Tonglin; Li Xiaoxu; Wang Zhelin	Tseng Wen-ting; Yang Chin-min; Wu Tai-hao; Tien Lei; Chen Shih-chieh; Hung Chih-shan; Liu Cheng; Tsai Wen-cheng; Lin Chih-chieh; Lu Cheng-ju; Ke Chi-hao; Chou Po-chen	Li Kim Wong; Lo Yi Ting; Lau Hoi To; Lee Ki; Chan Siu Wing; Ching Kin Man; Cheung Wai Hong; Cheng Kam Hing; Fong Shing Yee; Wong Chun Wai; Duncan Reid; Tsoi Lung Tak	Joginder Singh; Narender Kumar Grewal; Akilan Pari; Prakash Mishra; Pratham Singh; Vishesh Bhriguvanshi; Amritpal Singh; Prasanna Venkatesh; Palpreet Singh Brar; Amjyot Singh; Yadwinder Singh; Rikin Pethani
Iran	Japan	Jordan	Kazakhstan
Rouzbeh Arghavan; Sajjad Mashayekhi; Behnam Yakhchali; Mehdi Kamrani; Arman Zangeneh; Farid Aslani; Hamed Afagh; Oshin Sahakian; Asghar Kardoust; Mohammad Jamshidi; Samad Nikkhah Bahrami; Hamed Haddadi	Takumi Ishizaki; Ryumo Ono; Makoto Hiejima; Takatoshi Furukawa; Atsuya Ota; Naoto Tsuji; Kosuke Takeuchi; Daiki Tanaka; Tenketsu Harimoto; Yuki Togashi; Kosuke Kanamaru; Joji Takeuchi	Fadel Al-Najjar; Sinan Eid; Ahmad Al-Dwairi; Ahmad Al-Hamarsheh; Mohammad Hussein; Khaldoon Abu Ruqayah; Wesam Al-Sous; Mahmoud Abdeen; Mousa Al-Awadi; Ali Jamal Zaghab; Abdalla Abuqoura	Timur Sultanov; Vassiliy Savchenko; Rustam Murzagaliyev; Maxim Marchuk; Vitaliy Lapchenko; Anatoliy Kolesnikov; Pavel Ilyin; Anton Ponomarev; Dmitriy Klimov; Rustam Yargaliyev; Dmitriy Gavrilov
Kuwait	Maldives	Mongolia	Palestine
Mashari Abu Dhom; Ahmad Al-Baloushi; Hussain Al-Khabbaz; Abdullah Al-Shammari; Shayee Mohanna; Abdullah Al-Ajmi; Abdulaziz Dhari; Mohammad Ashkanani; Abdulaziz Al-Hamidi; Nayef Al-Rashidi; Saleh Al-Brahim; Nawwaf Al-Dhufairi	Ibrahim Rashwaan; Zakariya Abdul Latheef; Mohamed Zilaal; Ali Fazlee; Hussain Haleem; Ahmed Adhuham; Ahmed Ifsah; Ahmed Ali Musthafa; Ismail Vildhan Yoosuf; Ahmed Firash; Ilyas Ibrahim; Ahmed Aushan	Otgonbaataryn Sergelen; Mönkhbayaryn Badrakh; Oyuuntsetsegiin Uuganbayar; Ganboldyn Battör; Bataagiin Mönkhbold; Tungalagiin Sanchir; Battüvshingiin Bilgüün; Mönkhtöriin Otgonmönkh; Shiinengiin Sedbazar; Davaasambuugiin Delgernyam; Tserendagvyn Azbayar; Batdorjiin Odbayar	Ahmed Younis; Jamal Abu-Shamala; Ahmed Mahdi; Amin Salman; Wasim Mesk; Mousa Mousa; Ibrahim Aburahal; Sani Sakakini; Hamza Yousef; Salim Sakakini
Philippines	Qatar	Saudi Arabia	South Korea
Jimmy Alapag; LA Tenorio; Jeff Chan; Jared Dillinger; Gary David; Ranidel de Ocampo; Gabe Norwood; Marcus Douthit; June Mar Fajardo; Paul Lee; Japeth Aguilar; Marc Pingris	Boney Watson; Mansour El-Hadary; Mizo Amin; Daoud Musa; Khalid Suliman; Baker Ahmad; Yasseen Ismail; Erfan Ali Saeed; Mohammed Saleem; Mohammed Yousuf; Ahmed Al-Darwish; Omer Abdelqader	Mohammed Al-Marwani; Mohammed Fallatah; Marzouq Al-Muwallad; Jaber Al-Kaabi; Turki Al-Muhanna; Mustafa Al-Hawsawi; Rashad Shuri; Mohammed Al-Sager; Khalid Walibi; Abdullah Al-Taher; Ayman Al-Muwallad; Fahad Belal	Moon Tae-jong; Park Chan-hee; Yang Dong-geun; Kim Tae-sul; Lee Jong-hyun; Kim Sun-hyung; Cho Sung-min; Yang Hee-jong; Kim Joo-sung; Heo Il-young; Oh Se-keun; Kim Jong-kyu

== Results ==
All times are Korea Standard Time (UTC+09:00)

=== Qualifying round ===
==== Group A ====
Pos	Team	Pld	W	L	PF	PA	PD	Pts	Qualification
1	Kuwait	3	3	0	279	190	+89	6	Preliminary round
2	Mongolia	3	2	1	279	213	+66	5	Preliminary round
3	Hong Kong	3	1	2	257	212	+45	4	
4	Maldives	3	0	3	143	343	−200	3	

Source: Results

20 September
14:00

Mongolia	86–77	Hong Kong
Scoring by quarter: 17–21, 28–21, 14–12, 27–23
Pts: Sanchir 31; Rebs: Sanchir 13; Asts: Bilgüün, Otgonmönkh 3		Pts: Reid 15; Rebs: Reid 9 Asts: Lo 5

Samsan World Gymnasium, Incheon
Referees: Harja Jaladri (INA), Lei Si Man (MAC), Kim Jong-kuk (KOR)

20 September
16:15

Kuwait	116–44	Maldives
Scoring by quarter: 30–10, 29–7, 32–13, 25–14
Pts: Al-Shammari 23; Rebs: Al-Shammari 9 Asts: Dhari 5		Pts: Rashwaan 15; Rebs: Rashwaan, Zilaal 5 Asts: Rashwaan, Fazlee, Ifsah 3

Samsan World Gymnasium, Incheon
Referees: Shin Gi-rok (KOR), Lim Sok Hoon (MAS), Yang Hongfeng (CHN)

21 September
14:00

Hong Kong	65–81	Kuwait
Scoring by quarter: 15–20, 19–20, 22–19, 9–22
Pts: Lee 16; Rebs: Fong 10; Asts: Chan 2		Pts: Al-Baloushi, Al-Khabbaz 15; Rebs: Al-Rashidi, Al-Brahim 7 Asts: Al-Baloushi 3

Hwaseong Indoor Arena, Hwaseong
Referees: Lim Sok Hoon (MAS), Arnolfo Bermeo (PHI), Lee Seung-mu (KOR)

21 September
16:15

Maldives	54–112	Mongolia
Scoring by quarter: 10–15, 7–36, 15–34, 22–27
Pts: Rashwaan, Zilaal 12; Rebs: Firash 6 Asts: five players 1		Pts: Battör, Bilgüün, Odbayar 16; Rebs: Uuganbayar 8 Asts: Badrakh 5

Hwaseong Indoor Arena, Hwaseong
Referees: Reza Azarafza (IRI), Chan Mei Fung (HKG), Ryu Soo-hee (KOR)

22 September
14:00

Kuwait	82–81	Mongolia
Scoring by quarter: 25–24, 16–17, 17–22, 24–18
Pts: Dhari 13; Rebs: Dhari 8 Asts: Al-Shammari 5		Pts: Sanchir 23; Rebs: Sanchir 9 Asts: Sergelen 4

Samsan World Gymnasium, Incheon
Referees: Arsen Andryushkin (KAZ), Sung Ki-jun (KOR), Huang Chen-yu (TPE)

22 September
16:15

Hong Kong	115–45	Maldives
Scoring by quarter: 37–12, 17–5, 33–10, 28–18
Pts: Cheng, Wong 20; Rebs: Wong, Tsoi 9 Asts: Cheng 8		Pts: Zilaal 12; Rebs: Rashwaan 9 Asts: Zilaal, Fazlee 2

Samsan World Gymnasium, Incheon
Referees: Arnolfo Bermeo (PHI), Batbayaryn Ganzorig (MGL), Kim Cheong-soo (KOR)

==== Group B ====
Pos	Team	Pld	W	L	PF	PA	PD	Pts	Qualification
1	India	3	2	1	236	183	+53	5 (Note: Tied on head-to-head wins (1). Head-to-head game points average: IND 1.097, KAZ 1.079, KSA 0.846.)	Preliminary round
2	Kazakhstan	3	2	1	222	189	+33	5	Preliminary round
3	Saudi Arabia	3	2	1	221	227	−6	5	
4	Palestine	3	0	3	170	250	−80	3	

Source: Results
Notes:

20 September
14:00

Saudi Arabia	59–89	Kazakhstan
Scoring by quarter: 17–15, 12–20, 17–25, 13–29
Pts: M. Al-Muwallad 19; Rebs: M. Al-Muwallad, Al-Hawsawi 5 Asts: Al-Kaabi 2		Pts: Kolesnikov 18; Rebs: Kolesnikov 13; Asts: Sultanov 3

Hwaseong Indoor Arena, Hwaseong
Referees: Hwang In-tae (KOR), Reza Azarafza (IRI), Huang Chen-yu (TPE)

20 September
16:15

Palestine	49–89	India
Scoring by quarter: 6–20, 17–20, 18–28, 8–21
Pts: San. Sakakini 19; Rebs: San. Sakakini 12; Asts: Abu-Shamala 3		Pts: Amj. Singh 25; Rebs: Pethani 6 Asts: Bhriguvanshi 4

Hwaseong Indoor Arena, Hwaseong
Referees: Mohammad Reza Salehian (IRI), Yuji Higashi (JPN), Ryu Soo-hee (KOR)

21 September
14:00

Kazakhstan	72–50	Palestine
Scoring by quarter: 22–7, 12–6, 18–17, 20–20
Pts: Kolesnikov 21; Rebs: Ponomarev 11; Asts: Kolesnikov 3		Pts: San. Sakakini 28; Rebs: San. Sakakini 12; Asts: Abu-Shamala, Aburahal 3

Samsan World Gymnasium, Incheon
Referees: Yuji Higashi (JPN), Batbayaryn Ganzorig (MGL), Park Kyoung-jin (KOR)

21 September
16:15

India	67–73	Saudi Arabia
Scoring by quarter: 13–19, 14–21, 19–19, 21–14
Pts: Amr. Singh, Amj. Singh 19; Rebs: Bhriguvanshi 11; Asts: Bhriguvanshi 8		Pts: Belal 17; Rebs: Al-Marwani 13; Asts: A. Al-Muwallad 6

Samsan World Gymnasium, Incheon
Referees: Liang Bin (CHN), Lei Si Man (MAC), Hsieh Wen-wei (TPE)

22 September
14:00

Palestine	71–89	Saudi Arabia
Scoring by quarter: 18–17, 22–17, 21–29, 10–26
Pts: San. Sakakini 26; Rebs: San. Sakakini 16; Asts: San. Sakakini 2		Pts: M. Al-Muwallad, Al-Sager 26; Rebs: Al-Marwani 11; Asts: four players 1

Hwaseong Indoor Arena, Hwaseong
Referees: Harja Jaladri (INA), Jimmy Fung (HKG), Lee Kyoung-hwan (KOR)

22 September
16:15

Kazakhstan	61–80	India
Scoring by quarter: 14–24, 17–23, 19–22, 11–11
Pts: Ponomarev 16; Rebs: Ponomarev 14; Asts: Sultanov, Ilyin 2		Pts: J. Singh 25; Rebs: Amr. Singh, Amj. Singh 6 Asts: Pari 3

Hwaseong Indoor Arena, Hwaseong
Referees: Mohammad Al-Amiri (KUW), Choi Moon-shik (KOR), Yang Hongfeng (CHN)

=== Preliminary round ===
==== Group C ====
Pos	Team	Pld	W	L	PF	PA	PD	Pts	Qualification
1	China	2	2	0	135	117	+18	4	Quarterfinal round
2	Kazakhstan	2	1	1	133	144	−11	3	Quarterfinal round
3	Chinese Taipei	2	0	2	126	133	−7	2	

Source: Results

23 September
14:00

Chinese Taipei	68–74	Kazakhstan
Scoring by quarter: 14–23, 16–17, 13–9, 25–25
Pts: Lu 17; Rebs: Lin 6 Asts: Hung 4		Pts: Kolesnikov, Gavrilov 18; Rebs: Ponomarev 11; Asts: Ponomarev, Klimov 3

Samsan World Gymnasium, Incheon
Referees: Reza Azarafza (IRI), Chan Mei Fung (HKG), Batbayaryn Ganzorig (MGL)

24 September
14:00

Kazakhstan	59–76	China
Scoring by quarter: 7–19, 5–20, 22–15, 25–22
Pts: Ponomarev 11; Rebs: Murzagaliyev 9 Asts: Murzagaliyev 2		Pts: Wang 14; Rebs: Zhou Q., Li 7 Asts: Guo 3

Hwaseong Indoor Arena, Hwaseong
Referees: Mohammad Reza Salehian (IRI), Choi Moon-shik (KOR), Arnolfo Bermeo (PHI)

25 September
14:00

China	59–58	Chinese Taipei
Scoring by quarter: 17–10, 13–12, 17–16, 12–20
Pts: Zhou P., Wang 12; Rebs: Wang 8 Asts: Zhai 2		Pts: Tien 10; Rebs: Tseng 8 Asts: Liu, Lin, Ke 2

Samsan World Gymnasium, Incheon
Referees: Yuji Higashi (JPN), Mohammad Reza Salehian (IRI), Lee Kyoung-hwan (KOR)

==== Group D ====
Pos	Team	Pld	W	L	PF	PA	PD	Pts	Qualification
1	South Korea	2	2	0	188	136	+52	4	Quarterfinal round
2	Mongolia	2	1	1	150	164	−14	3	Quarterfinal round
3	Jordan	2	0	2	143	181	−38	2	

Source: Results

23 September
18:30

Jordan	74–83	Mongolia
Scoring by quarter: 18–14, 15–21, 18–28, 23–20
Pts: Al-Awadi 22; Rebs: Al-Dwairi 12; Asts: Al-Sous 5		Pts: Bilgüün 26; Rebs: Bilgüün 10; Asts: Badrakh 7

Samsan World Gymnasium, Incheon
Referees: Yuji Higashi (JPN), Shin Gi-rok (KOR), Arnolfo Bermeo (PHI)

24 September
18:30

Mongolia	67–90	South Korea
Scoring by quarter: 21–18, 17–21, 12–30, 17–21
Pts: Sanchir 24; Rebs: Bilgüün 7 Asts: Badrakh 2		Pts: Oh 22; Rebs: Oh 8 Asts: Kim T., Yang H. 4

Hwaseong Indoor Arena, Hwaseong
Referees: Mohammad Al-Amiri (KUW), Reza Azarafza (IRI), Jimmy Fung (HKG)

25 September
18:30

South Korea	98–69	Jordan
Scoring by quarter: 18–8, 32–17, 24–17, 24–27
Pts: Moon 21; Rebs: Kim J.S., Oh 8 Asts: Yang D., Kim T., Kim S. 4		Pts: Al-Sous 28; Rebs: Al-Hamarsheh 20; Asts: Al-Hamarsheh 7

Samsan World Gymnasium, Incheon
Referees: Harja Jaladri (INA), Arnolfo Bermeo (PHI), Yang Hongfeng (CHN)

==== Group E ====
Pos	Team	Pld	W	L	PF	PA	PD	Pts	Qualification
1	Iran	2	2	0	144	104	+40	4	Quarterfinal round
2	Philippines	2	1	1	148	144	+4	3	Quarterfinal round
3	India	2	0	2	117	161	−44	2	

Source: Results

23 September
14:00

Philippines	85–76	India
Scoring by quarter: 24–16, 26–21, 20–16, 15–23
Pts: Chan, Douthit 14; Rebs: Douthit 10; Asts: Alapag, Norwood 3		Pts: Amr. Singh 16; Rebs: Bhriguvanshi 6 Asts: Bhriguvanshi 5

Hwaseong Indoor Arena, Hwaseong
Referees: Arsen Andryushkin (KAZ), Sung Ki-jun (KOR), Hsieh Wen-wei (TPE)

24 September
14:00

India	41–76	Iran
Scoring by quarter: 16–22, 12–16, 8–20, 5–18
Pts: Amr. Singh 10; Rebs: Bhriguvanshi 9 Asts: J. Singh, Amr. Singh 4		Pts: Nikkhah, Haddadi 16; Rebs: Zangeneh 8 Asts: Nikkhah, Haddadi 4

Samsan World Gymnasium, Incheon
Referees: Harja Jaladri (INA), Hwang In-tae (KOR), Shin Gi-rok (KOR)

25 September
14:00

Iran	68–63	Philippines
Scoring by quarter: 29–17, 7–17, 14–19, 18–10
Pts: Nikkhah 23; Rebs: Haddadi 15; Asts: Kamrani 5		Pts: Lee 11; Rebs: Douthit 10; Asts: Tenorio 2

Hwaseong Indoor Arena, Hwaseong
Referees: Mansour Al-Ahmari (KSA), Hwang In-tae (KOR), Hsieh Wen-wei (TPE)

==== Group F ====
Pos	Team	Pld	W	L	PF	PA	PD	Pts	Qualification
1	Qatar	2	2	0	151	140	+11	4	Quarterfinal round
2	Japan	2	1	1	160	147	+13	3	Quarterfinal round
3	Kuwait	2	0	2	144	168	−24	2	

Source: Results

23 September
18:30

Qatar	79–69	Kuwait
Scoring by quarter: 21–16, 22–16, 19–14, 17–23
Pts: Suliman 25; Rebs: Suliman 9 Asts: Watson 4		Pts: Al-Baloushi 17; Rebs: Al-Shammari 7 Asts: Al-Baloushi 3

Hwaseong Indoor Arena, Hwaseong
Referees: Harja Jaladri (INA), Mohammad Reza Salehian (IRI), Hwang In-tae (KOR)

24 September
18:30

Kuwait	75–89	Japan
Scoring by quarter: 19–25, 13–30, 20–22, 23–12
Pts: Al-Baloushi 16; Rebs: Al-Rashidi 7 Asts: Dhari 4		Pts: Kanamaru 18; Rebs: K. Takeuchi 10; Asts: Ishizaki 6

Samsan World Gymnasium, Incheon
Referees: Arsen Andryushkin (KAZ), Lee Kyoung-hwan (KOR), Sung Ki-jun (KOR)

25 September
18:30

Japan	71–72	Qatar
Scoring by quarter: 22–21, 9–18, 25–19, 15–14
Pts: Tsuji 19; Rebs: K. Takeuchi 13; Asts: Hiejima 3		Pts: Musa 15; Rebs: Watson, Saeed, Yousuf 7 Asts: Yousuf 3

Hwaseong Indoor Arena, Hwaseong
Referees: Arsen Andryushkin (KAZ), Kim Jong-kuk (KOR), Reza Azarafza (IRI)

=== Quarterfinal round ===
==== Group G ====
Pos	Team	Pld	W	L	PF	PA	PD	Pts	Qualification
1	Iran	3	3	0	264	195	+69	6	Semifinals
2	Japan	3	2	1	234	224	+10	5	Semifinals
3	China	3	1	2	247	221	+26	4	Classification (5–8)
4	Mongolia	3	0	3	206	311	−105	3	Classification (5–8)

Source: Results

26 September
14:00

China	108–67	Mongolia
Scoring by quarter: 32–18, 18–17, 29–11, 29–21
Pts: Zhao 21; Rebs: Guo 9 Asts: Guo 6		Pts: Sanchir 15; Rebs: Sanchir 4 Asts: Badrakh 4

Samsan World Gymnasium, Incheon
Referees: Mohammad Al-Amiri (KUW), Jimmy Fung (HKG), Lee Seung-mu (KOR)

26 September
18:30

Iran	82–59	Japan
Scoring by quarter: 16–15, 29–22, 16–9, 21–13
Pts: Sahakian 17; Rebs: Haddadi 9 Asts: Afagh 4		Pts: Kanamaru 14; Rebs: J. Takeuchi 6 Asts: four players 2

Samsan World Gymnasium, Incheon
Referees: Arsen Andryushkin (KAZ), Kim Jong-kuk (KOR), Arnolfo Bermeo (PHI)

27 September
14:00

Mongolia	69–107	Iran
Scoring by quarter: 20–25, 17–27, 16–37, 16–18
Pts: Uuganbayar, Mönkhbold, Otgonmönkh 13; Rebs: Delgernyam 6 Asts: Azbayar 3		Pts: Jamshidi 20; Rebs: Yakhchali 8 Asts: Kamrani 6

Hwaseong Indoor Arena, Hwaseong
Referees: Arnolfo Bermeo (PHI), Park Kyoung-jin (KOR), Kim Jong-kuk (KOR)

27 September
18:30

Japan	79–72	China
Scoring by quarter: 14–21, 19–21, 21–19, 25–11
Pts: Hiejima 23; Rebs: J. Takeuchi 10; Asts: Hiejima 3		Pts: Ding, Zhou P. 14; Rebs: Sun 12; Asts: Guo, Sun 2

Hwaseong Indoor Arena, Hwaseong
Referees: Arsen Andryushkin (KAZ), Lei Si Man (MAC), Hwang In-tae (KOR)

28 September
15:15

Iran	75–67	China
Scoring by quarter: 22–13, 13–13, 21–18, 19–23
Pts: Nikkhah 14; Rebs: Haddadi 10; Asts: Nikkhah 7		Pts: Zhou Q. 17; Rebs: Zhou Q. 11; Asts: Guo 4

Samsan World Gymnasium, Incheon
Referees: Arsen Andryushkin (KAZ), Hwang In-tae (KOR), Arnolfo Bermeo (PHI)

28 September
19:45

Mongolia	70–96	Japan
Scoring by quarter: 23–29, 13–20, 18–22, 16–25
Pts: Sanchir 26; Rebs: Sanchir 6 Asts: Sergelen 4		Pts: Kanamaru, J. Takeuchi 23; Rebs: K. Takeuchi, J. Takeuchi 10; Asts: Hiejima 6

Samsan World Gymnasium, Incheon
Referees: Harja Jaladri (INA), Lim Sok Hoon (MAS), Kim Jong-kuk (KOR)

==== Group H ====
Pos	Team	Pld	W	L	PF	PA	PD	Pts	Qualification
1	South Korea	3	3	0	239	213	+26	6	Semifinals
2	Kazakhstan	3	1	2	190	201	−11	4 (Note: Tied on head-to-head wins (1). Head-to-head game points average: KAZ 1.048, QAT 1.008, PHI 0.951.)	Semifinals
3	Qatar	3	1	2	192	198	−6	4	Classification (5–8)
4	Philippines	3	1	2	230	239	−9	4	Classification (5–8)

Source: Results
Notes:

26 September
14:00

Kazakhstan	60–77	South Korea
Scoring by quarter: 5–20, 21–22, 14–15, 20–20
Pts: Gavrilov 17; Rebs: Marchuk, Gavrilov 8 Asts: Murzagaliyev 2		Pts: Oh 16; Rebs: Oh 6 Asts: Yang D., Kim T. 4

Hwaseong Indoor Arena, Hwaseong
Referees: Reza Azarafza (IRI), Lim Sok Hoon (MAS), Liang Bin (CHN)

26 September
18:30

Philippines	68–77	Qatar
Scoring by quarter: 19–19, 20–17, 12–20, 17–21
Pts: Alapag 15; Rebs: Pingris 8 Asts: Alapag, de Ocampo 3		Pts: Yousuf 19; Rebs: Yousuf 8 Asts: Watson, El-Hadary 3

Hwaseong Indoor Arena, Hwaseong
Referees: Harja Jaladri (INA), Lei Si Man (MAC), Mohammad Reza Salehian (IRI)

27 September
14:00

South Korea	97–95	Philippines
Scoring by quarter: 18–22, 26–29, 27–21, 26–23
Pts: Moon 38; Rebs: Oh 8 Asts: Kim T. 5		Pts: Alapag 25; Rebs: Fajardo 10; Asts: Norwood 5

Samsan World Gymnasium, Incheon
Referees: Mohammad Al-Amiri (KUW), Yang Hongfeng (CHN), Mohammad Reza Salehian (IRI)

27 September
18:30

Qatar	57–65	Kazakhstan
Scoring by quarter: 14–12, 14–11, 14–25, 15–17
Pts: Musa 16; Rebs: Yousuf 8 Asts: Watson, Musa 2		Pts: Kolesnikov 17; Rebs: Ponomarev 13; Asts: Sultanov, Murzagaliyev 3

Samsan World Gymnasium, Incheon
Referees: Harja Jaladri (INA), Reza Azarafza (IRI), Yuji Higashi (JPN)

28 September
15:15

Philippines	67–65	Kazakhstan
Scoring by quarter: 14–8, 21–13, 17–18, 15–26
Pts: Douthit 18; Rebs: Douthit 14; Asts: Alapag, de Ocampo, Norwood 2		Pts: Ilyin 21; Rebs: Kolesnikov, Ponomarev 10; Asts: Ilyin 4

Hwaseong Indoor Arena, Hwaseong
Referees: Yuji Higashi (JPN), Shin Gi-rok (KOR), Reza Azarafza (IRI)

28 September
19:45

South Korea	65–58	Qatar
Scoring by quarter: 12–17, 20–16, 17–12, 16–13
Pts: Kim S. 13; Rebs: Oh 8 Asts: Kim T. 5		Pts: Musa 16; Rebs: Yousuf 10; Asts: Watson, El-Hadary, Ismail 1

Hwaseong Indoor Arena, Hwaseong
Referees: Mohammad Al-Amiri (KUW), Mohammad Reza Salehian (IRI), Lei Si Man (MAC)

=== Classification (5–8) ===
Semifinals
29 September
Mongolia	78
Qatar	87
29 September
China	78
Philippines	71

Classification 5th–6th
1 October
Qatar	60
China	70
Classification 7th–8th
1 October
Mongolia	68
Philippines	84

==== Semifinals ====
29 September
16:15

Mongolia	78–87	Qatar
Scoring by quarter: 24–19, 14–23, 18–23, 22–22
Pts: Uuganbayar 25; Rebs: Bilgüün 6 Asts: Sergelen 7		Pts: Ahmad 27; Rebs: Saeed 8 Asts: El-Hadary 7

Samsan World Gymnasium, Incheon
Referees: Yuji Higashi (JPN), Hwang In-tae (KOR), Reza Azarafza (IRI)

29 September
16:15

China	78–71	Philippines
Scoring by quarter: 21–17, 21–17, 23–19, 13–18
Pts: Liu 16; Rebs: Zhou Q. 9 Asts: Liu 5		Pts: Douthit 24; Rebs: Tenorio 10; Asts: Tenorio 3

Hwaseong Indoor Arena, Hwaseong
Referees: Mohammad Al-Amiri (KUW), Kim Jong-kuk (KOR), Mohammad Reza Salehian (IRI)

==== Classification 7th–8th ====
1 October
15:15

Mongolia	68–84	Philippines
Scoring by quarter: 21–18, 9–20, 25–25, 13–21
Pts: Bilgüün 18; Rebs: Delgernyam 7 Asts: Sergelen 4		Pts: de Ocampo 25; Rebs: Fajardo 12; Asts: de Ocampo 7

Hwaseong Indoor Arena, Hwaseong
Referees: Reza Azarafza (IRI), Lee Seung-mu (KOR), Park Kyoung-jin (KOR)

==== Classification 5th–6th ====
1 October
15:15

Qatar	60–70	China
Scoring by quarter: 10–29, 20–16, 13–16, 17–9
Pts: Ahmad 24; Rebs: Yousuf 9 Asts: El-Hadary 4		Pts: Guo, Zhao 15; Rebs: Li 9 Asts: Liu, Zhao 2

Samsan World Gymnasium, Incheon
Referees: Yuji Higashi (JPN), Mohammad Reza Salehian (IRI), Sung Ki-jun (KOR)

=== Final round ===
Semifinals
1 October
Japan	63
South Korea	71
1 October
Iran	80
Kazakhstan	78

Gold medal game
3 October
South Korea	79
Iran	77
Bronze medal game
3 October
Japan	76
Kazakhstan	72

==== Semifinals ====
1 October
19:45

Japan	63–71	South Korea
Scoring by quarter: 20–18, 14–16, 9–15, 20–22
Pts: Tsuji 18; Rebs: J. Takeuchi 8 Asts: Hiejima, Tsuji 3		Pts: Lee 12; Rebs: Oh 9 Asts: Yang D., Kim T. 3

Samsan World Gymnasium, Incheon
Referees: Mohammad Al-Amiri (KUW), Yang Hongfeng (CHN), Lei Si Man (MAC)

1 October
19:45

Iran	80–78	Kazakhstan
Scoring by quarter: 23–22, 25–20, 16–22, 16–14
Pts: Nikkhah 27; Rebs: Haddadi 7 Asts: Kamrani 7		Pts: Ilyin, Ponomarev 16; Rebs: Kolesnikov 10; Asts: Murzagaliyev 3

Hwaseong Indoor Arena, Hwaseong
Referees: Harja Jaladri (INA), Liang Bin (CHN), Hwang In-tae (KOR)

==== Bronze medal game ====
3 October
16:00

Japan	76–72	Kazakhstan
Scoring by quarter: 20–22, 22–15, 15–19, 19–16
Pts: Kanamaru 21; Rebs: K. Takeuchi 9 Asts: Hiejima 9		Pts: Gavrilov 22; Rebs: Ponomarev 15; Asts: Murzagaliyev, Kolesnikov, Ilyin 3

Samsan World Gymnasium, Incheon
Referees: Reza Azarafza (IRI), Kim Jong-kuk (KOR), Yang Hongfeng (CHN)

==== Gold medal game ====
3 October
18:15

South Korea	79–77	Iran
Scoring by quarter: 25–16, 17–20, 16–25, 21–16
Pts: Moon 19; Rebs: Oh 6 Asts: Yang D. 5		Pts: Nikkhah 30; Rebs: Sahakian, Haddadi 6 Asts: Nikkhah, Haddadi 3

Samsan World Gymnasium, Incheon
Referees: Mohammad Al-Amiri (KUW), Harja Jaladri (INA), Liang Bin (CHN)

== Final standing ==
Rank	Team	Pld	W	L
1st place, gold medalist(s)	South Korea	7	7	0
2nd place, silver medalist(s)	Iran	7	6	1
3rd place, bronze medalist(s)	Japan	7	4	3
4	Kazakhstan	10	4	6
5	China	7	5	2
6	Qatar	7	4	3
7	Philippines	7	3	4
8	Mongolia	10	3	7
9	Chinese Taipei	2	0	2
9	India	5	2	3
9	Jordan	2	0	2
9	Kuwait	5	3	2
13	Hong Kong	3	1	2
13	Saudi Arabia	3	2	1
15	Maldives	3	0	3
15	Palestine	3	0	3
