= Abdullah Matalkeh =

Qatari basketball player (born 1991)

Al Wakrah
- Position: Center
- League: Qatari Basketball League

Personal information
- Born: March 8, 1991 (age 35) Doha, Qatar
- Listed height: 6 ft 8 in (2.03 m)

Career information
- Playing career: 2009–present

Career history
- 2009–2017: Al-Rayyan
- 2017–present: Al-Wakrah

Abdullah Shaher Matalkeh Abrahem (born March 8, 1991) is a Qatari professional basketball player. He currently plays for Al-Wakrah SC of the Qatari Basketball League and the FIBA Asia Champions Cup.

He represented Qatar's national basketball team at the 2016 FIBA Asia Challenge in Tehran, Iran.
