= Demarius Bolds =

American basketball player (born 1984)

Al-Shorta
- Position: Shooting guard
- League: Iraqi Basketball League

Personal information
- Born: May 6, 1984 (age 42) East St. Louis, Illinois
- Listed height: 6 ft 4 in (1.93 m)
- Listed weight: 198 lb (90 kg)

Career information
- High school: East St. Louis (East St. Louis, Illinois)
- College: Missouri Western (2004–2006)
- NBA draft: 2006: undrafted
- Playing career: 2007–present

Career history
- 2007–2008: St. Louis Stunners
- 2008–2009: Panevezys Techasas
- 2009–2010: Bashkimi Prizren
- 2011–2012: Milton Keynes Lions
- 2012–2013: BC Kolín
- 2013–2014: Apollon Patras
- 2014–2015: Naft Al-Janoob
- 2015: Al Rayyan
- 2015: Al-Shorta
- 2015–2016: Lavrio
- 2016: Sagesse
- 2016–2017: Lavrio
- 2017–2018: Al Mouttahed Tripoli
- 2018: Al Wakrah
- 2018: Al Muharraq
- 2018: Kymis
- 2018–2019: Champville SC
- 2019: Atlas Ferzol
- 2023–present: Al-Shorta

Career highlights
- Greek League Steals Leader (2014); BBL All-Defensive First Team (2012)

Demarius Bolds (born May 6, 1984) is an American professional basketball player for GS Pétroliers. Standing at 1.93 m (6 ft 4 in), he plays the shooting guard position. After two years at Missouri Western State University, Bolds entered the 2006 NBA draft but was not selected in the draft's two rounds.

== High school career ==
Bolds played high school basketball at Cahokia High School, in Cahokia, Illinois.

== College career ==
Bolds played college basketball for the Missouri Western Griffons from 2004 to 2006.

== Playing career ==
After going undrafted in the 2006 NBA draft Bolds played for the St. Louis Stunners during 2007–2008 season, as well as the Panevezys Techasas in 2008–2009.

On October 3, 2014, Bolds joined Nift Al-Janoub from Iraq. On February 23, 2015, Bolds left Nift Al-Janoub and joined Al Rayyan of the Qatari Basketball League.

He started the 2015–16 season with Final Gençlik. On December 10, 2015, he signed with Greek team Lavrio. He went on to average 15.9 points, 3.7 rebounds, 1.6 assists and 1.5 steals in 16 games for Lavrio. On April 10, 2016, he signed with Sagesse for the remainder of the season.

On June 19, 2016, Bolds returned to Lavrio, renewing his contract for one more year.

On August 17, 2017, Bolds joined Al Mouttahed Tripoli of the Lebanese Basketball League. On March 27, 2018, Bolds left Al Mouttahed and joined Al Wakrah of the Qatari Basketball League. He finished the season in Bahrain with Al Muharraq.

On July 10, 2018 he joined Kymis of the Greek Basket League. On October 20, 2018, he scored 31 points, grabbed 10 rebounds and gave 3 assists in a loss against Kolossos Rodou. On November 11, 2018, he left Kymis, after being replaced from Reggie Holmes in the team's squad. On November 20, 2018, he joined Champville SC of the Lebanese Basketball League.

On February 21, 2020, Bolds signed with GS Pétroliers in Algeria. However, the season was cancelled due to the COVID-19 pandemic.
