= Erfan Ali Saeed =

Qatari basketball player (born 1983)

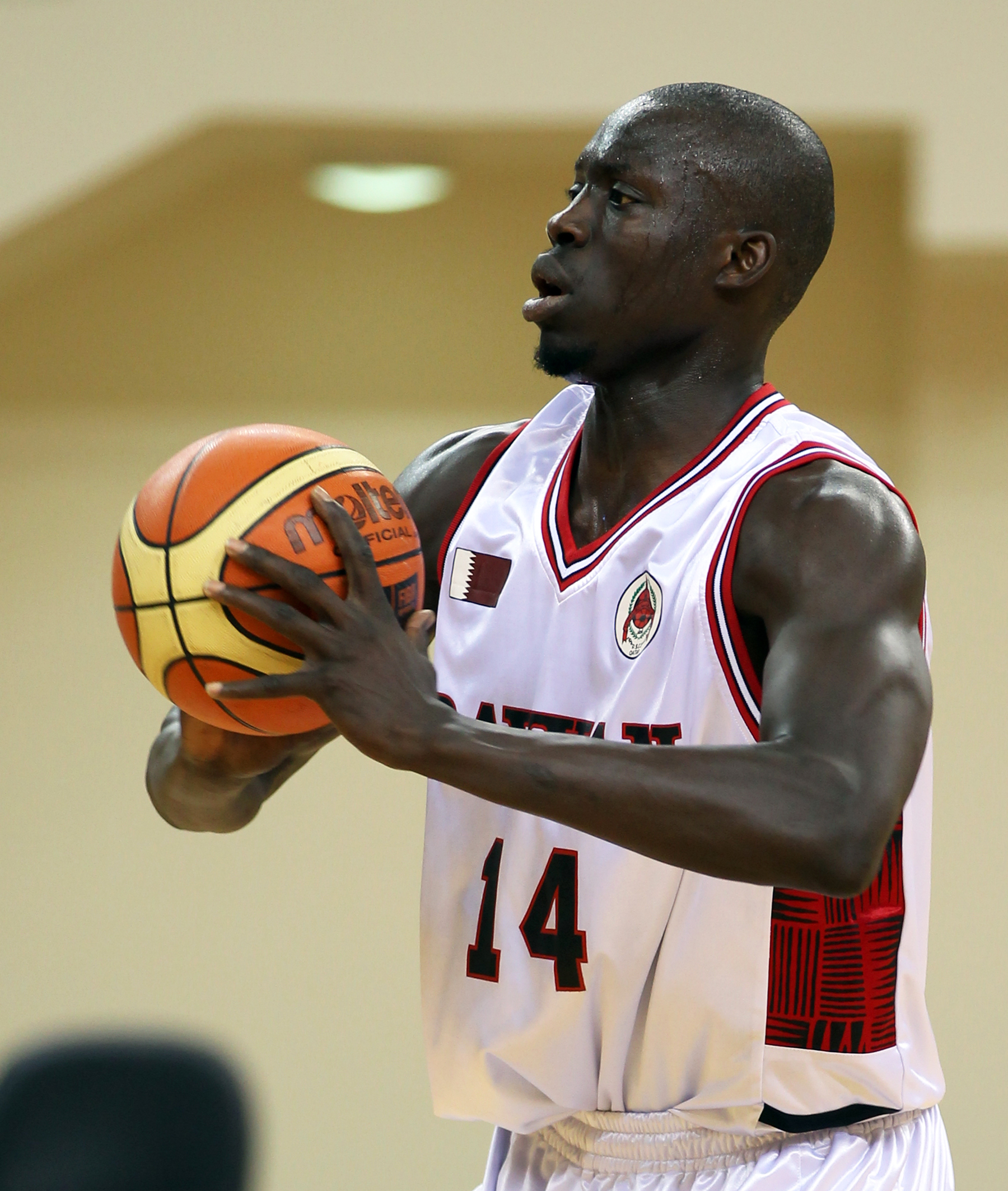
- Erfan Saeed in 2012

Personal information
- Born: 20 December 1983 (age 42) Doha, Qatar
- Listed height: 6 ft 7 in (2.01 m)

Career information
- Playing career: 1999–2024
- Position: Forward

Career history
- 2005–2007: Al-Rayyan
- 2007–2009: Al-Arabi
- 2009–2013: Al-Rayyan
- 2013–2016: Al-Sadd
- 2016–2017: El Jaish SC
- 2017–2022: Al-Wakrah
- 2022–2023: Al-Shamal
- 2023–2024: Al-Arabi
Medals
Representing Qatar
Men's basketball
Asian Games
Silver medal – second place	2006 Doha	Team
Men's 3x3 basketball
World Championships
Gold medal – first place	2014 Moscow	Team

Erfan Ali Saeed (Arabic: عرفان علي سعيد; born 20 December 1983) is a Qatari former professional basketball player who last played for Al-Arabi of the Qatari Basketball League. He also represented the Qatar national team.

Ali competed for Qatar at the 2007 and 2009 FIBA Asia Championship. He also competed for Qatar at their first FIBA World Championship in 2006, where he averaged 10 points, 5 rebounds, and 3 assists per game.
