= Abdelrahman Abdelhaleem =

Qatari basketball player (born 1996)

BK Sabah
- Position: Forward
- League: Qatari Basketball League; FIBA Asia Champions Cup

Personal information
- Born: June 26, 1996 (age 30) Doha, Qatar
- Listed height: 6 ft 8 in (2.03 m)

Career information
- Playing career: 2014–present

Career history
- 2014-2020: Al-Rayyan
- 2020-2022: Al-Wakrah
- 2022-2023: BK Sabah

Abdelrahman Yehia Abdelhaleem (born June 26, 1996) is a Qatari professional basketball player. He currently plays for BK Sabah.

He represented Qatar's national basketball team at the 2016 FIBA Asia Challenge in Tehran, Iran. There, he recorded most blocks for his team.
