= Malek Saleem =

Qatari basketball player (born 1985)

Al Wakrah
- Position: Forward
- League: Qatari Basketball League

Personal information
- Born: 13 May 1985 (age 41)
- Listed height: 6 ft 5 in (1.96 m)

Career information
- Playing career: 2005–present

Career history
- 2005–2016: Al-Rayyan
- 2016–present: Al-Wakrah

Malek Saleem Abdullah (born 13 May 1985) is a Qatari professional basketball player. He currently plays for Al Wakrah of the Qatari Basketball League.

He represented Qatar's national basketball team at the 2016 FIBA Asia Challenge in Tehran, Iran. There, he was his team's best free throw shooter.
