= Omer Abdelqader =

Qatari basketball player (born 1983)

Al-Khor
- Position: Center
- League: Qatar Basketball League

Personal information
- Born: October 1, 1983 (age 43) Qatar
- Listed height: 6 ft 9 in (2.06 m)

Career history
- 2005–2008: Al-Rayyan
- 2008–2009: Al-Arabi
- 2009–2010: Al-Gharafa
- 2010–2011: Al-Rayyan
- 2011–2013: Al-Gharafa
- 2013–2014: Al-Rayyan
- 2014–2018: Al-Gharafa
- 2018–2022: Al-Shamal
- 2022–present: Al-Khor

Omer Abdelqader
Medal record

Men's basketball

Representing Qatar

Asian Games
Silver medal – second place	2006 Doha	Team

Omer Abdelqader (born October 1, 1983, in Doha, Qatar) is a professional basketball player. He plays for Al-Khor of the Qatar basketball league. He is also a member of the Qatar national basketball team.

Abdelqader competed for the Qatar national basketball team at the 2007 and FIBA Asia Championship 2009. He also competed for Qatar at their only FIBA World Championship performance to date, in 2006, where he averaged 5.4 points and 5.8 rebounds per game.
