= Tanguy Ngombo =

Qatari basketball player (born 1984)

Al Rayyan Doha
- Position: Small forward

Personal information
- Born: July 18, 1984 (age 42) [disputed] Brazzaville, People's Republic of the Congo
- Listed height: 6 ft 6 in (1.98 m)
- Listed weight: 204 lb (93 kg)

Career information
- NBA draft: 2011: 2nd round, 57th overall pick
- Drafted by: Dallas Mavericks
- Playing career: 2005–2020

Career history
- 2005–2006: Inter Club Brazzaville
- 2006–2020: Al Rayyan
- Stats at Basketball Reference
Medals
Men's basketball
Representing Qatar
FIBA Asia Stanković Cup
| Bronze medal – third place | 2010 Beirut | National team |

Tanguy Alban Harrys Ngombo, often incorrectly written as Targuy Ngombo (born July 18, 1984 [disputed]), is a Congolese–Qatari professional basketball player who plays for Al Rayyan of the Qatari Basketball League. He has represented the Qatari national team in international competition. He was drafted by the Dallas Mavericks with the 57th pick in the 2011 NBA draft. His draft rights were subsequently traded to the Portland Trail Blazers and then to the Minnesota Timberwolves. He is the first Qatari national basketball player to be selected in the NBA draft.

== Career ==
Ngombo has played in Qatar since 2006 after playing for the Inter Club Brazzaville in his home nation of the Congo. In 2011, he helped Al Rayyan win the Qatar Basketball League. He led his team in scoring and rebounds, averaging 20.7 points and 8.9 rebounds per game. He then helped Al-Rayyan finish third in the FIBA Asia Champions Cup while averaging 16.3 points per game.

Ngombo has represented the Qatari national team since 2010. He played in the 2010 FIBA Asia Stanković Cup, helping Qatar win the bronze medal. He played in all 7 games and led the team in scoring in every game with an average of 30.0 points per game. He then played for Qatar in the 2010 Asian Games in Guangzhou, China. He played in all 8 games, averaging 19.6 points per game as Qatar finished in 5th place.

On June 23, 2011, he was drafted by the Dallas Mavericks with the 57th pick in the second round of the 2011 NBA draft. His draft rights were immediately traded to the Portland Trail Blazers as part of a three-team trade with the Denver Nuggets. The Blazers then traded his rights to the Minnesota Timberwolves in exchange for a future second-round pick. His rights were ultimately removed by Minnesota a month after general manager David Kahn was fired and replaced by Flip Saunders.

== Age discrepancy ==
In 2005, Ngombo, who was still playing with Congolese team Inter Club Brazzaville, was listed as being born on July 18, 1984, in the 2005 FIBA Africa Clubs Champions Cup. A few years later, he was listed as being born in 1989 by FIBA Asia in the 2010 FIBA Asia Champions Cup, the 2010 FIBA Asia Stanković Cup and the 2010 Asian Games. However, in 2011, FIBA published a piece of contradictory information by listing 1984 as Ngombo's birth year on the Qatar roster for the 2011 FIBA Asia Championship.

At the 2011 NBA draft, he was selected as Targuy Ngombo, who was a soon-to-be 22 year old player born in 1989. After the draft, reports surfaced claiming that Ngombo lied about his name and his birth date and that he was actually born in 1984, which would have made him ineligible for the draft. The NBA rules state that an international player who is over the age of 22 is not eligible for the draft and must be signed as a free agent. Additionally, the use of the name Targuy was a misspelling; he was often listed under that name in several FIBA competitions. His trade to the Timberwolves, which was first reported on the night of the draft, was reportedly being held up for several days because of the age discrepancy.
