= Mohamed Youssef (basketball) =

Libyan basketball player

Mohamed Youssef Kuneidir Youssef
Personal information
- Born: January 10, 1986 (age 40) Benghazi, Libya

Career information
- Playing career: 2008–present
- Position: Forward

Career history
- 2013–2015: El Jaish SC (Qatar)

Mohamed Youssef (born January 10, 1986) is a Libyan professional basketball player. From 2013-2015, he played for the El Jaish SC club of the Qatari Basketball League.

He represented Libya's national basketball team at the official 2009 FIBA Africa Championship, where he recorded most steals for Libya.
