= Qatar men's national basketball team =

Qatar
- FIBA ranking: 74 ▲2 (1 September 2026)
- Joined FIBA: 1977
- FIBA zone: FIBA Asia
- National federation: QBF
- Coach: Hakan Demir

FIBA World Cup
- Appearances: 2

FIBA Asia Cup
- Appearances: 11
- Medals: (bronze) Bronze: (2003, 2005)
| Home | Away |
Medal record
| Event | 1st | 2nd | 3rd |
|---|---|---|---|
| FIBA Asia Championship | 0 | 0 | 2 |
| FIBA Asia Challenge | 1 | 0 | 2 |
| Asian Games | 0 | 1 | 0 |
| Total | 1 | 1 | 4 |

The Qatar national basketball team represents Qatar in international basketball competitions. It is administered by the Qatar Basketball Federation. (Arabic: الاتحاد القطري لكرة السلة) The team won two bronze medals at the Asian Basketball Championship and belongs to the major contenders among Arab nations. Qatar will host the 2027 World Cup.

== Competitions ==
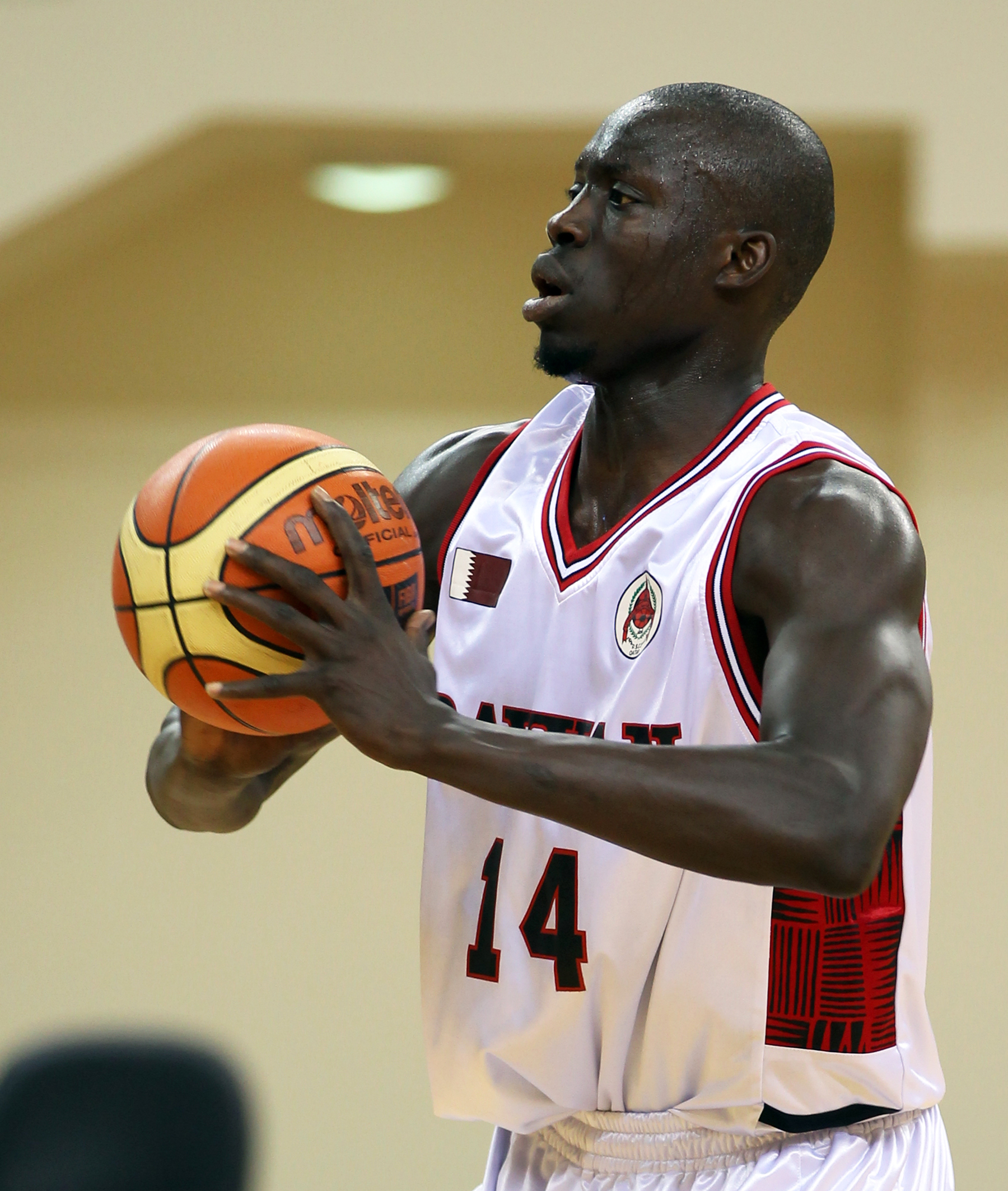
Erfan Saeed has been a member of Team Qatar for more than a decade.

=== FIBA Basketball World Cup ===
| Year | Position | Pld | W | L |
|---|---|---|---|---|
| (Argentina) 1950 | Not a FIBA member | | | |
| (Brazil) 1954 | Not a FIBA member | | | |
| (Chile) 1959 | Not a FIBA member | | | |
| (Brazil) 1963 | Not a FIBA member | | | |
| (Uruguay) 1967 | Not a FIBA member | | | |
| (Socialist Federal Republic of Yugoslavia) 1970 | Not a FIBA member | | | |
| (Puerto Rico) 1974 | Not a FIBA member | | | |
| (Philippines) 1978 | Not a FIBA member | | | |
| (Colombia) 1982 | Did not enter | | | |
| (Spain) 1986 | Did not enter | | | |
| (Argentina) 1990 | Did not enter | | | |
| (Canada) 1994 | Did not enter | | | |
| (Greece) 1998 | Did not enter | | | |
| (United States) 2002 | Did not qualify | | | |
| (Japan) 2006 | 21st place | 5 | 0 | 5 |
| (Turkey) 2010 | Did not qualify | | | |
| (Spain) 2014 | Did not qualify | | | |
| (China) 2019 | Did not qualify | | | |
| (Philippines) (Japan) (Indonesia) 2023 | Did not qualify | | | |
| (Qatar) 2027 | Qualified as host | | | |
| (France) 2031 | To be determined | | | |
| Total | 2/21 | 5 | 0 | 5 |

=== FIBA Asia Cup ===
| Year | Position | Pld | W | L |
|---|---|---|---|---|
| (Philippines) 1960 | Not a FIBA member | | | |
| (Taiwan) 1963 | Not a FIBA member | | | |
| (Malaysia) 1965 | Not a FIBA member | | | |
| (South Korea) 1967 | Not a FIBA member | | | |
| (Thailand) 1969 | Not a FIBA member | | | |
| (Japan) 1971 | Not a FIBA member | | | |
| (Philippines) 1973 | Not a FIBA member | | | |
| (Thailand) 1975 | Not a FIBA member | | | |
| (Malaysia) 1977 | Not a FIBA member | | | |
| (Japan) 1979 | did not enter | | | |
| (India) 1981 | did not enter | | | |
| (Hong Kong) 1983 | did not enter | | | |
| (Malaysia) 1985 | did not enter | | | |
| (Thailand) 1987 | did not enter | | | |
| (China) 1989 | did not enter | | | |
| (Japan) 1991 | 16th place | 7 | 1 | 6 |
| (Indonesia) 1993 | did not enter | | | |
| (South Korea) 1995 | did not enter | | | |
| (Saudi Arabia) 1997 | did not enter | | | |
| (Japan) 1999 | did not enter | | | |
| (China) 2001 | 5th place | 7 | 4 | 3 |
| (China) 2003 | 3rd place | 8 | 6 | 2 |
| (Qatar) 2005 | 3rd place | 8 | 7 | 1 |
| (Japan) 2007 | 7th place | 8 | 5 | 3 |
| (China) 2009 | 6th place | 9 | 4 | 5 |
| (China) 2011 | 16th place | 5 | 0 | 5 |
| (Philippines) 2013 | 6th place | 8 | 5 | 3 |
| (China) 2015 | 7th place | 9 | 4 | 5 |
| (Lebanon) 2017 | 13th place | 3 | 0 | 3 |
| (Indonesia) 2022 | did not qualify | | | |
| (Saudi Arabia) 2025 | 13th place | 3 | 0 | 3 |
| 2029 | To be determined | | | |
| Total | 11/31 | 75 | 36 | 39 |

=== Asian Games ===
- 1978 – 14th
- 2002 – 9th
- 2006 – (silver)
- 2010 – 5th
- 2014 – 6th
- 2018 – 9th
- 2022 – 11th
- 2026 – 10th

=== Arab Nations Championship ===
- 1974–1997 – ?
- 1999 – (bronze)
- 2000–2005 – ?
- 2007 – 5th
- 2010 – ?
- 2011 – (gold)
- 2015–2023 – ?

=== Pan Arab Games ===
- 1953–2004 – ?
- 2007 – (bronze)
- 2011 – (gold)

== Team ==
=== Current roster ===
Roster for the 2025 FIBA Asia Cup.

Qatar men's national basketball team – 2025 FIBA Asia Cup roster
Players
Coaches

| Pos. | No. | Name | Age – Date of birth | Height | Club | Ctr. |
|---|---|---|---|---|---|---|
| G | 0 | Brandon Goodwin (NP) | 29 – 2 October 1995 | 1.83 m (6 ft 0 in) | Free agent |
| F | 1 | Tyler Harris | 31 – 1 September 1993 | 2.01 m (6 ft 7 in) | Al-Rayyan | (Qatar) |
| G | 3 | Mahmoud Luay Darwish | 22 – 2 April 2003 | 1.91 m (6 ft 3 in) | Al Ahli SC | (Qatar) |
| G | 4 | Abdulrahman Saad (C) | 29 – 2 July 1996 | 1.90 m (6 ft 3 in) | Al-Arabi SC | (Qatar) |
| C | 5 | Seydou Ndoye | 26 – 10 May 1999 | 2.03 m (6 ft 8 in) | Al Sadd | (Qatar) |
| C | 8 | Zine Eddine Bedri | 22 – 15 October 2002 | 2.08 m (6 ft 10 in) | Columbia Lions | (United States) |
| PG | 13 | Omar Saad | 25 – 13 May 2000 | 1.84 m (6 ft 0 in) | Al-Wakrah SC | (Qatar) |
| F | 14 | Mohammed Abbasher | 21 – 6 July 2004 | 2.01 m (6 ft 7 in) | Al Ahli SC | (Qatar) |
| C | 19 | Moustapha Ndao | 20 – 27 April 2005 | 1.88 m (6 ft 2 in) | Al Ahli SC | (Qatar) |
| F | 23 | Babacar Dieng | 27 – 17 September 1997 | 1.96 m (6 ft 5 in) | Al Sadd | (Qatar) |
| C | 33 | Bobo Magassa | 24 – 4 September 2000 | 1.98 m (6 ft 6 in) | Al-Rayyan | (Qatar) |
| C | 44 | Alen Hadžibegović | 26 – 19 March 1999 | 2.11 m (6 ft 11 in) | BC Lietkabelis | (Lithuania) |

Head coach

- (Turkey) Hakan Demir

Assistant coach(es)

- (Turkey) Cengiz Karadağ

Legend

- (C) Team captain
- (NP) Naturalized player
- Club – describes last
  club before the tournament
- Age – describes age
  on 5 August 2025

=== Past rosters ===
==== 2017 FIBA Asia Cup ====
Roster for the 2017 FIBA Asia Cup.

Qatar men's national basketball team – 2017 FIBA Asia Cup roster
Players
Coaches

| Pos. | No. | Name | Age – Date of birth | Height | Club | Ctr. |
|---|---|---|---|---|---|---|
| SG | 4 | Abdulrahman Saad | 21 – 2 July 1996 | 1.85 m (6 ft 1 in) | Al Gharafa Doha | (Qatar) |
| G/F | 5 | Ahmad Al-Darwish | 27 – 12 April 1990 | 1.89 m (6 ft 2 in) | Al-Wakrah | (Qatar) |
| PG | 6 | Mansour El Hadary | 27 – 12 April 1990 | 1.77 m (5 ft 10 in) | El Jaish | (Qatar) |
| G/F | 9 | Hassan Mohamed | 26 – 3 August 1991 | 1.91 m (6 ft 3 in) | Al Rayyan Doha | (Qatar) |
| G | 10 | Abdulrahman Al-Muftah | 22 – 30 October 1994 | 1.81 m (5 ft 11 in) | Al-Ahli | (Qatar) |
| PF | 11 | Erfan Ali | 33 – 20 December 1983 | 1.98 m (6 ft 6 in) | El Jaish | (Qatar) |
| PF | 12 | Abdelrahman Abdelhaleem | 21 – 26 June 1996 | 2.05 m (6 ft 9 in) | Al Rayyan Doha | (Qatar) |
| F/C | 13 | Mohammed Yousuf | 34 – 9 September 1982 | 2.04 m (6 ft 8 in) | El Jaish | (Qatar) |
| C | 15 | Omer Abdelqader | 33 – 1 October 1983 | 2.07 m (6 ft 9 in) | Al Gharafa Doha | (Qatar) |
| PG | 16 | Mohamed Abdelaziz | 21 – 23 November 1995 | 1.79 m (5 ft 10 in) | Al Rayyan Doha | (Qatar) |
| C | 42 | Nasser Al-Rayes | 22 – 6 September 1994 | 2.08 m (6 ft 10 in) | Caltech Beavers | (United States) |

Head coach

- (Iraq) Kousay Hatem Khalaf

Assistant coach(es)

- (Egypt) Yaser Abdelrehim Abdelwahab Mohamed

Legend

- (C) Team captain
- (NP) Naturalized player
- Club – describes last
  club before the tournament
- Age – describes age
  on 8 August 2017

==== 2015 FIBA Asia Championship ====
2015 FIBA Asia Championship squad:

Qatar men's national basketball team – 2015 FIBA Asia Championship roster
Players
Coaches

| Pos. | No. | Name | Age – Date of birth | Height | Club |
|---|---|---|---|---|---|---|
| C | 4 | Abdelrahman Yehia Abdelhaleem | 19 – 26 June 1996 | 2.00 m (6 ft 7 in) | Al Rayyan Basketball Team | (Qatar) |
| PG | 5 | Trey Johnson | 31 – 30 August 1984 | 1.96 m (6 ft 5 in) | Marinos de Anzoátegui | (Venezuela) |
| SG | 6 | Saad Abdulrahman Ali | 30 – 2 May 1985 | 1.93 m (6 ft 4 in) | Al Sadd Basketball Team | (Qatar) |
| G/F | 7 | Daoud Musa | 33 – 2 February 1982 | 1.93 m (6 ft 4 in) | Al Sadd Basketball Team | (Qatar) |
| SF | 8 | Khalid Suliman | 28 – 7 February 1987 | 1.98 m (6 ft 6 in) | Al Sadd Basketball Team | (Qatar) |
| SG | 9 | Mohamed Hasaan A Mohamed | 24 – 3 August 1991 | 1.95 m (6 ft 5 in) | Al Rayyan Basketball Team | (Qatar) |
| G | 10 | Abdulrahman Mohamed Saad | 19 – 2 July 1996 | 1.88 m (6 ft 2 in) | Al Gharafa Doha | (Qatar) |
| PF | 11 | Erfan Ali | 31 – 20 December 1983 | 2.01 m (6 ft 7 in) | Al Sadd Basketball Team | (Qatar) |
| C | 12 | Mohamed Saleem Abdulla | 29 – 16 June 1986 | 2.01 m (6 ft 7 in) | Al Rayyan Basketball Team | (Qatar) |
| C | 13 | Mohd Yousuf Mohamed | 33 – 9 September 1982 | 2.05 m (6 ft 9 in) | El Jaish SC (basketball) | (Qatar) |
| F | 14 | Abduallah Shaher Matalkeh | 24 – 8 March 1991 | 2.01 m (6 ft 7 in) | Al Rayyan Basketball Team | (Qatar) |
| C | 15 | Khalid Abdalla Adam | 22 – 27 February 1993 | 2.05 m (6 ft 9 in) | Al Gharafa Doha | (Qatar) |

Head coach

- (Greece) Vassilis Fragkias

Assistant coach(es)

- (Greece) Georgios Bitzanis

Legend

- (C) Team captain
- Club – describes last
  club before the tournament
- Age – describes age
  on 19 September 2014

==== 2014 Asian Games ====
2014 Asian Games squad:

Qatar men's national basketball team – 2014 Asian Games roster
Players
Coaches

| Pos. | No. | Name | Age – Date of birth | Height | Club |
|---|---|---|---|---|---|---|
| PG | 4 | Boney Harold Watson | 36 – 26 March 1978 | 1.80 m (5 ft 11 in) | Al Rayyan Basketball Team | (Qatar) |
| PG | 5 | Mansour Atif El Hadary | 24 – 12 April 1990 | 1.80 m (5 ft 11 in) | Al-Arabi SC (Qatar) | (Qatar) |
| SG | 6 | Mohamed Hasaan A Mohamed | 24 – 3 August 1991 | 1.95 m (6 ft 5 in) | Al Rayyan Basketball Team | (Qatar) |
| G/F | 7 | Daoud Musa | 32 – 2 February 1982 | 1.93 m (6 ft 4 in) | Al Sadd Basketball Team | (Qatar) |
| SF | 8 | Khalid Suliman | 27 – 7 February 1987 | 1.98 m (6 ft 6 in) | Al Sadd Basketball Team | (Qatar) |
| SF | 9 | Baker Ahmad Mohamed | 28 – 11 August 1986 | 2.01 m (6 ft 7 in) | El Jaish SC | (Qatar) |
| PF | 10 | Yasseen Ismail (C) | 34 – 12 August 1980 | 2.03 m (6 ft 8 in) | Al Rayyan Basketball Team | (Qatar) |
| PF | 11 | Erfan Ali | 30 – 20 December 1983 | 2.01 m (6 ft 7 in) | Al Sadd Basketball Team | (Qatar) |
| PF | 12 | Mohammed Seleem Abdulla | 32 – 17 July 1982 | 2.01 m (6 ft 7 in) | Al Rayyan Basketball Team | (Qatar) |
| C | 13 | Mohd Yousuf Mohamed | 32 – 9 September 1982 | 2.05 m (6 ft 9 in) | El Jaish SC | (Qatar) |
| F | 14 | Ahmad Yousif Al Darwish | 24 – 12 April 1990 | 1.89 m (6 ft 2 in) | Al-Wakrah SC (basketball) | (Qatar) |
| PF | 15 | Omer Abdelqader | 30 – 1 October 1983 | 2.00 m (6 ft 7 in) | Al-Gharafa Sports Club | (Qatar) |

Head coach

- (Greece) Vassilis Fragkias

Assistant coach(es)

- (Greece) Georgios Bitzanis

Legend

- (C) Team captain
- Club – describes last
  club before the tournament
- Age – describes age
  on 19 September 2014
- Source: incheon2014ag.org

==== 2013 FIBA Asia Championship ====
2013 FIBA Asia Championship squad:

Head coach: Thomas Wisman

| # | Pos | Name | Height | Team |
|---|---|---|---|---|
| 4 | Guard | Mansour El Hadary | 5 ft 9 | Al Arabi |
| 5 | Forward | Jarvis Hayes | 6 ft 7 | Elizur Ashkelon |
| 6 | Guard | Saad Abdulrahman Ali | 6 ft 4 | Al Sadd |
| 7 | Guard | Daoud Musa | 6 ft 4 | Al Sadd |
| 8 | Forward | Khalid Suliman | 6 ft 6 | Al Sadd |
| 9 | Forward | Ali Turki Ali | 6 ft 7 | El Jaish |
| 10 | Center | Yasseen Ismail | 6 ft 8 | Al Rayyan |
| 11 | Forward | Erfan Ali Saeed | 6 ft 6 | Al Rayyan |
| 12 | Center | Mohammed Saleem Abdulla | 6 ft 9 | Al Rayyan |
| 13 | Center | Mohammed Yousuf | 6 ft 8 | El Jaish |
| 14 | Forward | Malek Saleem | 6 ft 4 | Al Rayyan |
| 15 | Forward | Baker Ahmad Mohammed | 6 ft 7 | El Jaish |

==== 2006 FIBA World Championship ====
2006 FIBA World Championship squad:

Head coach: Joseph Stiebing

| # | Pos | Name | Year Born | Team |
|---|---|---|---|---|
| 4 | Guard | Khalid Masoud Al Nasr | 1980 | (Qatar) Al Arabi |
| 5 | Guard | Malek Saleem Abdullah | 1985 | (Qatar) Al Rayyan |
| 6 | Guard | Saad Abdulrahman Ali | 1985 | (Qatar) Al Sadd |
| 7 | Guard | Daoud Musa | 1982 | Qatar Club |
| 8 | Forward | Khalid Suliman | 1987 | (Qatar) Al Sadd |
| 9 | Forward | Ali Turki | 1982 | (Qatar) Al Jaysh |
| 10 | Forward | Baker Ahmad Mohammed | 1986 | (Qatar) Al Rayyan |
| 11 | Forward | Erfan Ali Saeed | 1983 | (Qatar) Al Rayyan |
| 12 | Center | Mohammed Saleem Abdulla | 1982 | (Qatar) Al Rayyan |
| 13 | Forward | Hammam Ismail | 1983 | Free agent |
| 14 | Center | Hashim Zaidan | 1980 | (Qatar) Al-Ahli |
| 15 | Center | Omer Abdelqader | 1983 | (Qatar) Al Rayyan |

=== Notable players ===
Other current notable players from Qatar:

Qatar roster
| Players | Coaches |
|---|---|
| Pos. / No. / Name / Age – Date of birth / Height / Club / Ctr.; G / / Trey Johnson / 32 – 30 August 1984 / 1.96 m (6 ft 5 in) / Free agent | Legend: Club – describes current club; Age – describes age on 15 April 2017 |

=== Head coach history ===
- (United States) Joseph Stiebing – 2003–2006
- (United States) Kent Davison – 2006
- (United States) Joey Stiebing 2006–2007
- (United States) Eric Gardow – 2007–2008
- (Iraq) Kosay Hatem – 2011
- (United States) / (United Kingdom) Thomas Wisman – 2012–2013
- (Greece) Vassilis Fragkias – 2014–2017
- (Iraq) Kosay Hatem – 2017
- (Cyprus) Panayiotis Yiannaras – 2018–2020
- (Serbia) Miodrag Perišić – 2020–2023
- (Greece) Thanasis Skourtopoulos – 2023–2024
- (Turkey) Hakan Demir – 2024–

== See also ==
- Qatar women's national basketball team
- Qatar men's national under-19 basketball team
- Qatar men's national under-16 basketball team
- Qatar men's national 3x3 team
