= Justin Watts =

American basketball player (born 1990)

Personal information
- Born: July 1, 1990 (age 36) Durham, North Carolina, U.S.
- Listed height: 195 cm (6 ft 5 in)
- Listed weight: 102 kg (225 lb)

Career information
- High school: Jordan (Durham, North Carolina)
- College: North Carolina (2008–2012)
- NBA draft: 2012: undrafted
- Playing career: 2013–2023
- Position: Shooting guard / small forward

Career history
- 2013: Rockhampton Rockets
- 2014: Mineros de Caborca
- 2014–2015: Takamatsu Five Arrows
- 2015: Defensor Sporting
- 2016: Vaqueros de Agua Prieta
- 2016–2017: New Heroes Den Bosch
- 2017–2018: Czarni Słupsk
- 2018: Al Gharafa Doha
- 2018: Pieno žvaigždės
- 2018–2019: Fribourg Olympic
- 2019: Wilki Morskie Szczecin
- 2019: Alaska Aces
- 2019–2020: MKS Dąbrowa Górnicza
- 2021: Donar
- 2022–2023: Chernomorets Burgas

Career highlights
- bj league All-Star (2015); QBL champion (2013); NCAA champion (2009)

Justin Lee Watts (born July 1, 1990) is an American former professional basketball player. He played college basketball for the University of North Carolina, where he won an NCAA Championship as a freshman in 2009. He turned pro in 2013 and won a QBL championship with the Rockhampton Rockets. He went on to play with clubs in Mexico, Japan, Uruguay, the Netherlands, Poland, Qatar, Lithuania, Switzerland, the Philippines, and Bulgaria.

== High school career ==
Watts attended Charles E. Jordan High School in Durham, North Carolina. He was a three-year starter for Coach Kim Annas and was in the Jordan program for four seasons. He was a leading scorer on all three of the varsity teams he played on, topped by a senior season in which he averaged 24.4 points and 8.7 rebounds. Also an outstanding student, Watts was the Pac-6 Conference Player of the Year, the District 6 Player of the Year, and three-time all-conference selection and Jordan Most Valuable Player. He also made the all-tournament team at the GlaxoSmithKline Tournament in December 2007 and was named a second-team NCBCA All-State honoree in 2008.

In April 2024, Watts was inducted into the Jordan High School Hall of Fame.

== College career ==
On May 21, 2008, Watts signed a National Letter of Intent to play college basketball for the North Carolina Tar Heels.

As a freshman at UNC in 2008–09, Watts was a member of the national championship team that were victorious in the 2009 NCAA Men's Division I Basketball Tournament. He played in 27 games, including four of the six games in the NCAA Tournament, and scored the final two points against Michigan State in the NCAA championship game in Detroit. He totalled 19 points and five assists during the season and had a season-high nine points and four rebounds in Maui against Chaminade.

Watts had a subdued college career, as he finished his four-year stint with averages of 1.4 points and 1.3 rebounds in 6.7 minutes over 122 games. Throughout his time at UNC, Watts was co-captain on a team who were perennial finalists with multiple players every year being drafted to the NBA, and although his opportunities were limited playing alongside numerous NBA recruits, he still made an impact when he was on the court, as his versatility allowed him to play multiple positions from point guard to power forward.

=== College statistics ===
Legend
GP	Games played	GS	Games started	MPG	Minutes per game
FG%	Field goal percentage	3P%	3-point field goal percentage	FT%	Free throw percentage
RPG	Rebounds per game	APG	Assists per game	SPG	Steals per game
BPG	Blocks per game	PPG	Points per game	**Bold**	Career high

Year	Team	GP	GS	MPG	FG%	3P%	FT%	RPG	APG	SPG	BPG	PPG
2008–09	North Carolina	27	0	3.1	.242	.000	.429	.7	.2	.1	.1	.7
2009–10	North Carolina	23	**2**	6.2	.405	**.444**	.429	.8	**.8**	.2	**.2**	1.7
2010–11	North Carolina	34	0	**9.2**	.375	.333	**.533**	**1.9**	.5	.1	.1	**1.9**
2011–12	North Carolina	**38**	1	7.2	**.422**	.167	.368	1.3	.2	**.3**	.1	1.2
Career		122	3	6.7	.368	.286	.457	1.3	.4	.2	.1	1.4

== Professional career ==
=== Rockhampton Rockets (2013) ===
In March 2013, Watts signed with the Rockhampton Rockets for the 2013 Queensland Basketball League season. In his debut, he scored a season-high 28 points against the Gladstone Port City Power. He scored 20 points or more 13 times throughout the season, and helped the Rockets finish the regular season in first place with a 14–2 record. The Rockets went on to advance to the QBL Grand Final, where they defeated the Brisbane Capitals 102–95 to win the championship behind an 18-point effort from Watts. He appeared in all 18 games for the Rockets in 2013, averaging 22.3 points, 7.2 rebounds, 3.3 assists and 1.1 steals per game.

=== Mineros de Caborca (2014) ===
After negotiations with the Rockhampton Rockets fell through in March 2014, Watts joined Mexican team Mineros de Caborca for the 2014 CIBACOPA season. In his debut, he scored a season-high 36 points against Zonkeys de Tijuana. He scored 30 points or more five times throughout the season. In 21 games, he averaged 22.8 points, 5.3 rebounds, 3.0 assists and 1.5 steals per game.

=== Takamatsu Five Arrows (2014–2015) ===
On August 20, 2014, Watts signed with the Takamatsu Five Arrows for the 2014–15 Japanese bj league season. He made his debut for the Five Arrows in their season opener on October 4, scoring 17 points in an 87–72 win over Bambitious Nara. On December 14, he had a season-best game with 29 points and 17 rebounds in a 107–77 loss to the Akita Northern Happinets. On January 9, 2015, he was picked to compete in the 2015 bj league All-Star Game as a member of the Western Conference All-Star team. Watts helped Takamatsu finish the regular season as the eighth seed in the Western Conference with a 17–35 record. In their first-round playoff match-up with the first-seeded Kyoto Hannaryz, Takamatsu were defeated 2–0 despite an 18-point effort from Watts in Game 1. Watts appeared in all 54 games for Takamatsu in 2014–15, averaging 13.5 points, 4.5 rebounds, 2.6 assists and 1.0 steals per game.

=== Defensor Sporting (2015) ===
On August 22, 2015, Watts signed with Defensor Sporting for the 2015–16 LUB season. He sustained an injury on November 3, which resulted in him being replaced in the line-up by Robert Hornsby on November 8. In seven games for Defensor, Watts averaged 12.3 points, 3.9 rebounds and 1.6 assists per game.

=== Vaqueros de Agua Prieta (2016) ===
In March 2016, Watts had a four-game stint with CIBACOPA team Vaqueros de Agua Prieta, averaging 11.8 points per game.

=== Den Bosch (2016–2017) ===
On October 26, 2016, Watts signed with New Heroes Den Bosch of the Dutch Basketball League. Den Bosch finished the 2016–17 regular season in fourth place with a 14–14 record, and made it through to the semi-finals, where they were defeated 4–0 by the first-seeded Donar. In 25 games for Den Bosch, Watts averaged 14.0 points, 4.0 rebounds, 2.0 assists and 1.2 steals per game.

=== Czarni Słupsk (2017–2018) ===
On August 1, 2017, Watts signed with Polish team Czarni Słupsk for the 2017–18 PLK season. He left the team on January 10, 2018. In 13 games, he averaged 15.8 points, 4.8 rebounds and 2.7 assists per game.

=== Al Gharafa Doha (2018) ===
In February 2018, Watts joined Al Gharafa Doha of the Qatari Basketball League.

=== Pieno žvaigždės (2018) ===
In August 2018, Watts signed with Pieno žvaigždės of the Lithuanian Basketball League. He was released by the team on November 12. In 10 games, he averaged 8.8 points, 3.6 rebounds and 3.0 assists per game.

=== Fribourg Olympic Basket (2018–2019) ===
On November 13, 2018, Watts signed with Swiss team Fribourg Olympic Basket. In nine BCL games, he averaged 6.6 points, 1.7 rebounds, 1.7 assists per game. He also averaged 13.8 points, 4.0 rebounds, 3.5 assists and 1.3 steals in four SBL games.

=== Wilki Morskie Szczecin (2019) ===
On February 25, 2019, Watts signed with Wilki Morskie Szczecin of the Polish Basketball League, returning to the country for a second stint. In 14 games, he averaged 9.9 points, 3.1 rebounds, 1.8 assists and 1.3 steals per game.

=== Alaska Aces (2019) ===
On September 10, 2019, Watts signed with the Alaska Aces as the team's import for the 2019 PBA Governors' Cup. However, due to a calf injury, he was released after two games. He had 62 points and 26 rebounds over his two games.

=== MKS Dąbrowa Górnicza (2019–2020) ===
On December 17, 2019, Watts signed with MKS Dąbrowa Górnicza of the Polish Basketball League, returning to the country for a third stint. In nine games, he averaged 14.7 points, 3.3 rebounds, 1.7 assists and 1.0 steals per game.

=== Donar (2020–2021) ===
On July 15, 2020, Watts signed with Donar of the Dutch Basketball League. After encountering passport problems due to the COVID-19 pandemic, Watts was replaced on the roster by Henry Caruso before the preseason. He later joined Donar on January 11, 2021. In 19 games, he averaged 7.7 points and 3.3 rebounds per game.

=== Chernomorets Burgas (2022–2023) ===
In September 2022, Watts signed with Chernomorets Burgas of the Bulgarian National Basketball League. After appearing in four games, he missed a month of action due to a toe injury. He parted ways with the team in January 2023 after averaging 11 points, 3.6 rebounds and 2.1 assists in eight games.

== Personal life ==
Watts is the son of Gregory and Linda Watts. His cousin, Hank Poteat, played ten NFL seasons with Pittsburgh, Tampa Bay, New England, the New York Jets, and the Cleveland Browns.
