= Abdulrahman Saad =

Qatari-Egyptian basketball player (born 1996)

Abdulrahman Mohamed Saad
No. 2 – Al-Arabi
- Position: Guard
- League: Qatari Basketball League

Personal information
- Born: July 2, 1996 (age 30) Doha, Qatar
- Listed height: 6 ft 1 in (1.85 m)
- Listed weight: 190 lb (86 kg)

Career information
- Playing career: 2011–present

Career history
- 2011–2012: Al-Arabi
- 2012–2022: Al-Gharafa
- 2022–2023: Zamalek
- 2023–2024: Al-Gharafa
- 2024–present: Al-Arabi

Abdulrahman Mohamed Saad (born July 7, 1996) is a Qatari professional basketball player for Al-Arabi of the Qatari Basketball League. He previously played nine seasons for Al-Gharafa.

He represented Qatar's national basketball team at the 2015 FIBA Asia Championship in Changsha, China. There, he recorded most steals for his team.
