= El Jaish SC (basketball) =

- Leagues: Qatari Basketball League
- Founded: 2007
- Location: Doha, Qatar
- Head coach: Dragoslav Milovanovic
- Championships: Qatari Championship (2)
- Website: Official website
Home	Away

El Jaish SC is a Qatari professional basketball club. The club competes in the Qatari Basketball League.

The club has traditionally provided Qatar's national basketball team with key players.

== Current roster ==
Note: Flags indicate national team eligibility at FIBA-sanctioned events. Players may hold other non-FIBA nationalities not displayed.

El Jaish SC roster
Players
Coaches

Pos.	No.	Nat.	Name
PG	1	(Qatar)	Mansour El-Hadary
PG	6	(Qatar)	Fadi Hani Abilmoni
F	10	(Qatar)	Alioune Badara Ndoye
PF	11	(Qatar)	Ali Saeed Erfan
C	13	(Qatar)	Mohd Yousuf Mohmmed
PG	14	(United States)	Dominic James

Head coach

(Serbia) Dragoslav Milovanovic

Legend

- (C) Team captain
- Injured

- Roster
Updated: 6 August 2017

== Notable players ==
- (Qatar) Mohd Mohamed
- (Libya) Mohamed Youssef
- (United States) Anthony Anderson
- (United States) Devan Downey
- (United States) Sean Lampley
- (United States) Alex Legion
- (United States) Vernon Macklin

== See also ==
- El Jaish SC (football)
- El Jaish SC (handball)
- El Jaish SC (volleyball)
