= Railway Institute of Mongolia =

Academy in Bayangol, Ulaanbaatar, Mongolia

The Railway Institute of Mongolia (Mongolian: Төмөр Замын Дээд Сургууль) is a railway academy in Bayangol, Ulaanbaatar, Mongolia. It was established in 1953.

== Notable alumni ==
- Sergelen Otgonbaatar, basketball player
