= Daoud Musa =

Qatari basketball player (born 1982)

Daoud Musa Daoud
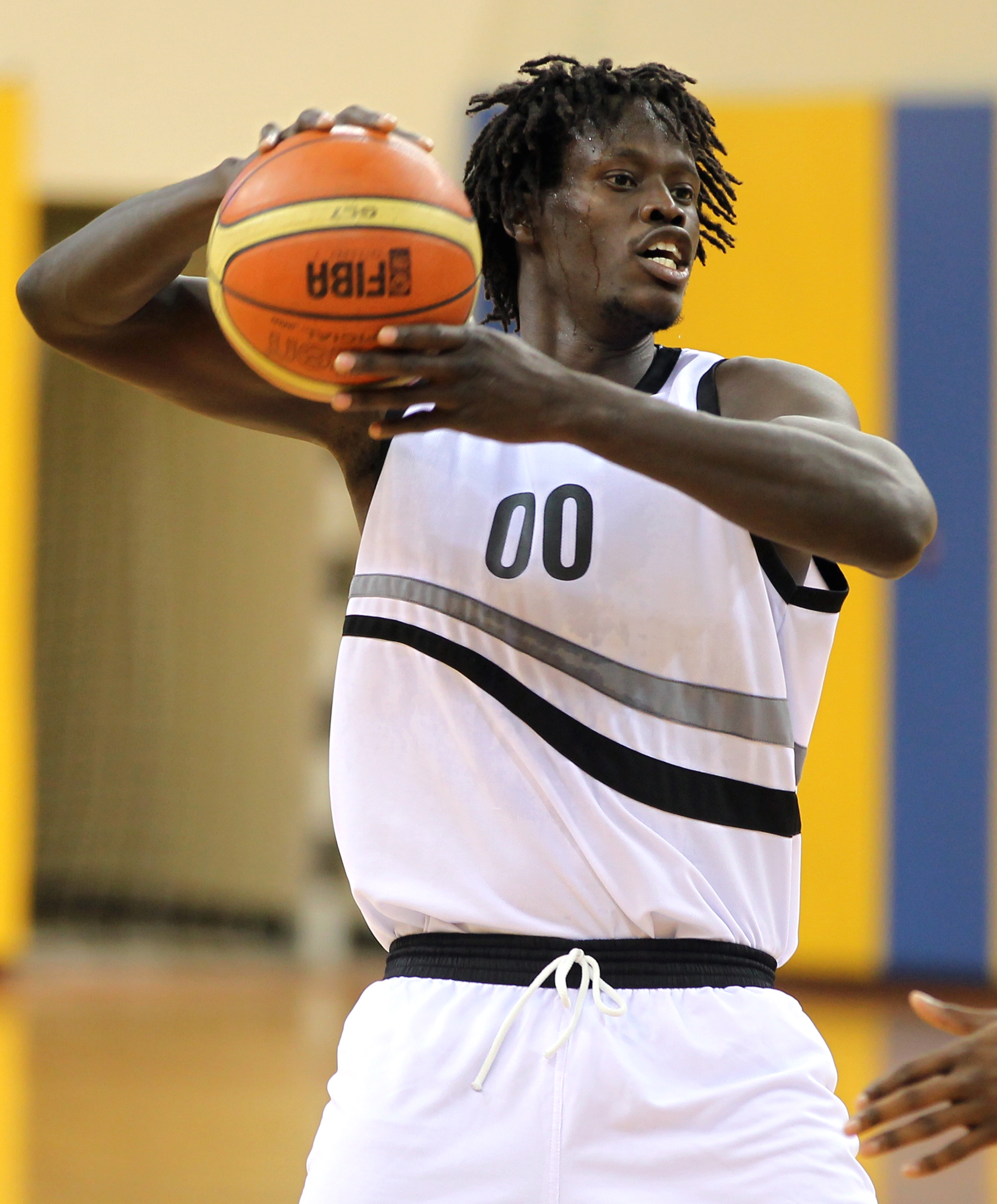
- Musa in 2012

Personal information
- Born: February 2, 1982 (age 44) Doha, Qatar
- Listed height: 6 ft 4 in (1.93 m)
- Position: Shooting guard

Career history
- 2005–2010: Qatar SC
- 2010–2016: Al-Sadd
- 2017–2018: Al-Khor

Daoud Musa Daoud (born February 2, 1982) is a former professional basketball player. He was also a member of the Qatar national basketball team.

Musa competed for the Qatar national basketball team at the 2005, 2007 and FIBA Asia Championship 2009. He also competed for Qatar at their only FIBA World Championship performance to date, in 2006, where he averaged 5.2 points per game. Previously he competed for the junior national team at the 1999 FIBA World Championship for Junior Men and 2001 FIBA World Championship for Young Men.
