= Khalid Abdalla Adam =

Qatari basketball player (born 1993)

Personal information
- Born: February 27, 1993 (age 33) Doha, Qatar
- Listed height: 6 ft 7 in (2.01 m)

Career information
- Playing career: 2012–2021
- Position: Forward

Career history
- 2012–2013: Al-Gharafa
- 2014–2016: Al-Shamal
- 2016–2021: Al-Gharafa

Khalid Abdalla Mohamed Adam (born February 27, 1993) is a Qatari former professional basketball player.

He represented Qatar's national basketball team at the 2016 FIBA Asia Challenge in Tehran, Iran.
