= Mohamed Abdelaziz (basketball) =

Qatari basketball player (born 1995)

Al Rayyan Doha
- Position: Point guard
- League: Qatari Basketball League; FIBA Asia Champions Cup

Personal information
- Born: November 23, 1995 (age 30) Doha, Qatar
- Listed height: 5 ft 10 in (1.78 m)

Career information
- Playing career: 2014–present

Career history
- 2014–2021: Al-Rayyan
- 2021–2022: Qatar SC
- 2022–present: Al-Rayyan

Mohamed Abdelaziz Elsayed Abdelkawy (born November 23, 1995) is a Qatari professional basketball player. He currently plays for Al Rayyan Doha of the Qatari Basketball League and the FIBA Asia Champions Cup.

He represented Qatar's national basketball team at the 2016 FIBA Asia Challenge in Tehran, Iran.
