= Mohammed Yousuf (basketball) =

Qatari basketball player (born 1982)

Mohammed Yousuf Mohamed
Al Gharafa Doha
- Position: Center
- League: QBL

Personal information
- Born: September 9, 1982 (age 44) Doha, Qatar
- Listed height: 6 ft 9 in (2.06 m)

Career information
- Playing career: 1999–present

Career history
- 2010–2012: Al-Sadd
- 2012–2013: El Jaish SC
- 2013–2015: Al-Arabi
- 2015–2017: El Jaish SC
- 2017–2019: Qatar SC
- 2019–present: Al-Gharafa

Mohammed Yousuf Mohamed (Arabic: محمد يوسف محمد) (born Sep 9, 1982) is a Qatari professional basketball player. He currently plays for Al-Gharafa SC of the Qatari Basketball League.

He represented Qatar's national basketball team at the 2015 FIBA Asia Championship in Changsha, China. There, he was his team's best rebounder.
