= Takuya Hashimoto =

Japanese basketball player

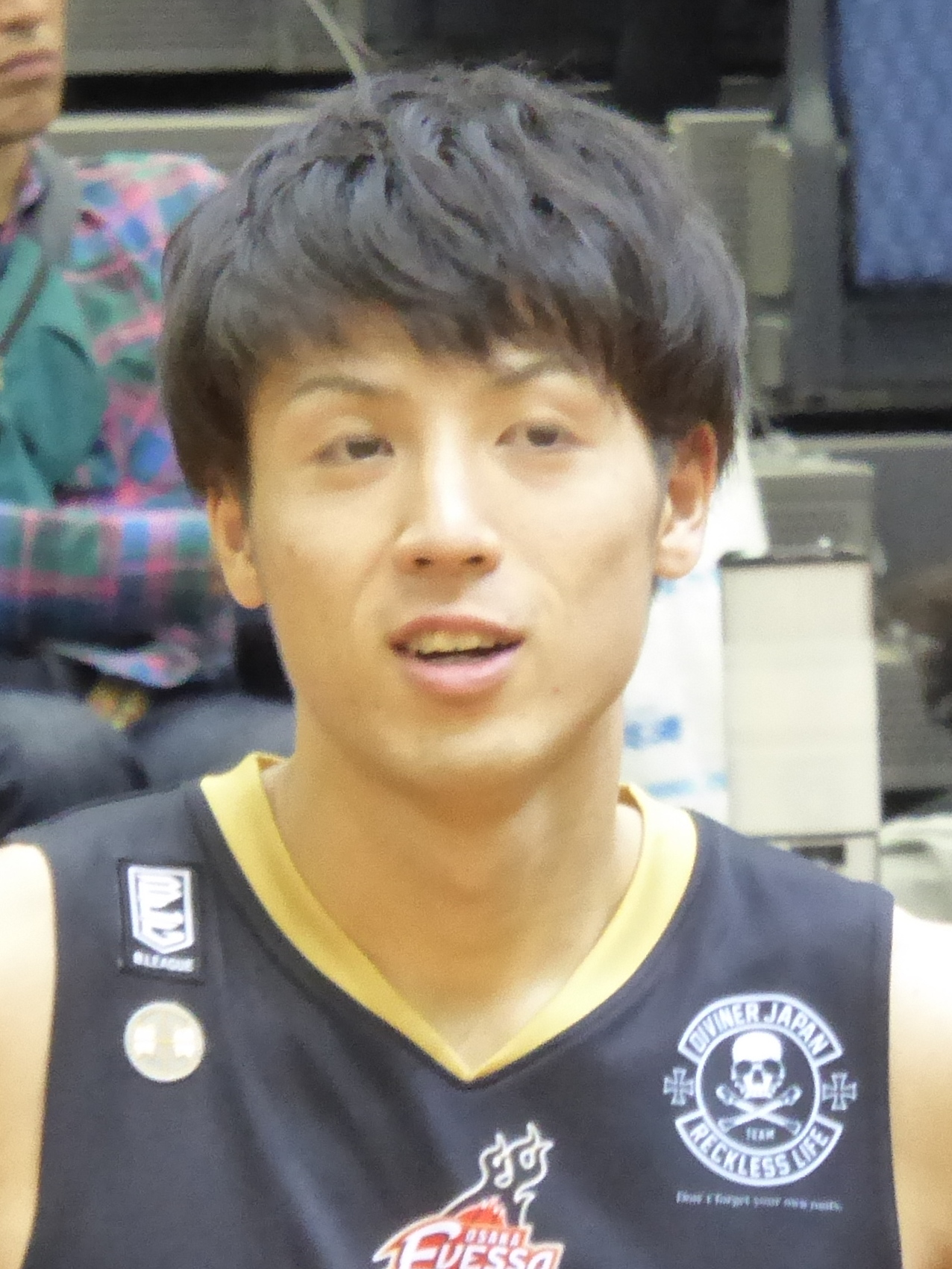

No. 14 – Osaka Evessa
- Position: Shooting guard
- League: B.League

Personal information
- Born: December 3, 1994 (age 31) Osaka, Osaka
- Listed height: 6 ft 2 in (1.88 m)
- Listed weight: 183 lb (83 kg)

Career information
- High school: Human Academy High School (Nagiso, Nagano)
- College: Ashiya University
- Playing career: 2012–present

Career history
- 2012-2013: Osaka Evessa
- 2016-: Osaka Evessa

Career highlights

Takuya Hashimoto (橋本拓哉, Hashimoto Takuya; born December 3, 1994) is a Japanese professional basketball player for Osaka Evessa of the B.League in Japan. He played college basketball for Ashiya University. The Japanese Olympic Committee penalized Hashimoto for buying sex in Jakarta and sent him back home on August 20, 2018. He had been suspended from official competition for one year.

== Career statistics ==
Legend
GP	Games played	GS	Games started	MPG	Minutes per game
FG%	Field goal percentage	3P%	3-point field goal percentage	FT%	Free throw percentage
RPG	Rebounds per game	APG	Assists per game	SPG	Steals per game
BPG	Blocks per game	PPG	Points per game	**Bold**	Career high

=== Regular season ===
Year	Team	GP	GS	MPG	FG%	3P%	FT%	RPG	APG	SPG	BPG	TO	PPG
2012-13	Osaka	33	0	7.6	33.8	0.0	45.0	1.4	0.2	0.2	0.4	0.7	1.7
2016-17	Osaka												
