= Mizo Amin =

Qatari basketball player (born 1991)

Mohamed Hassan A Mohamed
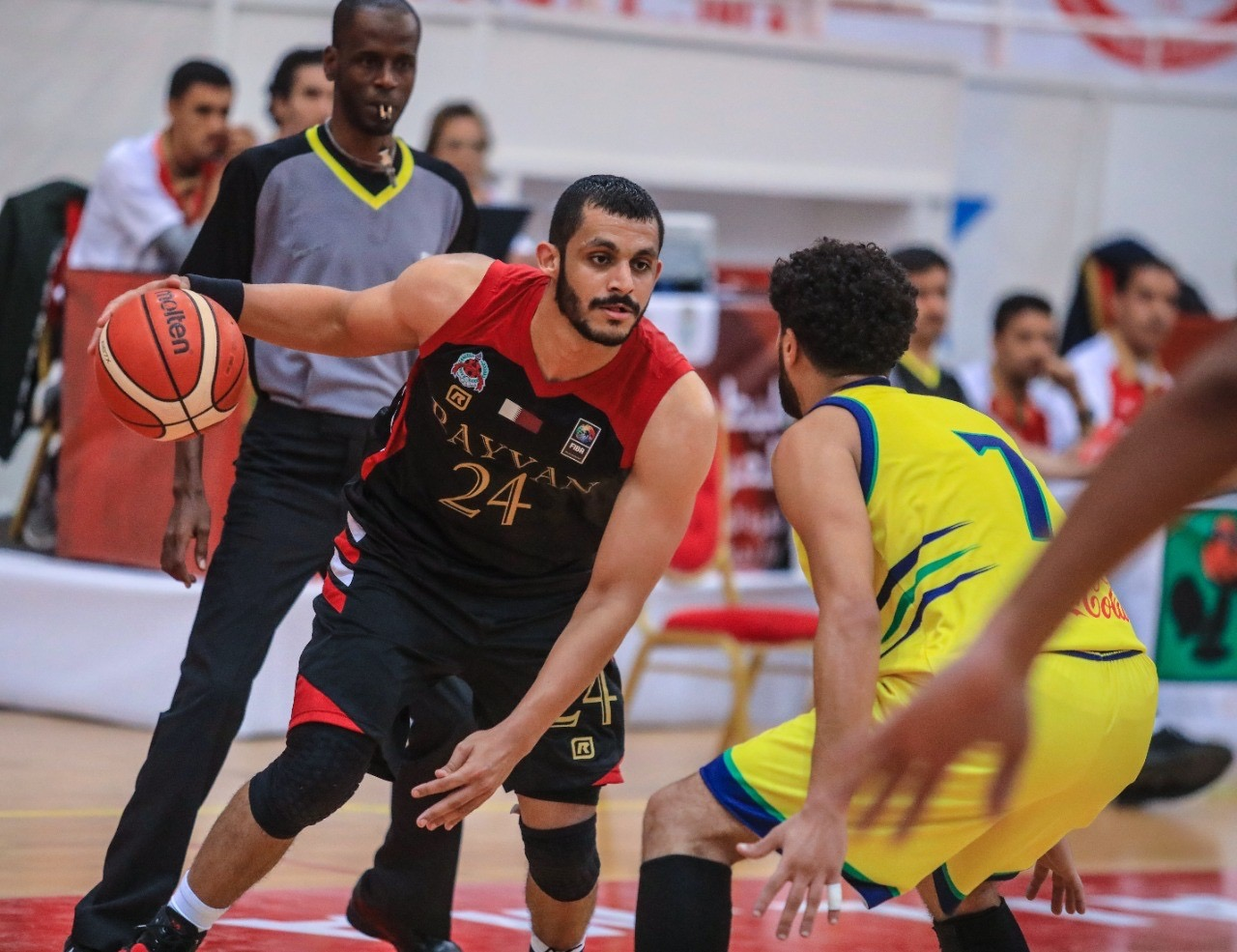
- Mohamed Hassan A Mohamed During the Arab Clubs Championship Morocco 2019 AKA Mizo Amin

Al Rayyan Doha
- Position: Guard / forward
- League: Qatari Basketball League

Personal information
- Born: August 3, 1991 (age 35) Cairo, Egypt
- Listed height: 6 ft 4 in (1.93 m)
- Listed weight: 218.2 lb (99 kg)

Career information
- High school: Doha Independent School
- College: Qatar University
- Playing career: 2008–present

Career history
- 2008–present: Al-Rayyan

Mohamed Hassan Abdelmoaty Mohamed (Arabic: محمد حسن عبد المعطي محمد أمين; born August 3, 1991), known professionally as Mizo Amin, is a professional basketball player. He was once the team captain of both Al Rayyan Sports Club and Qatar's national basketball team, participating at FIBA Asia championships.

He represented Qatar's national basketball team at the 2016 FIBA Asia Challenge in Tehran, Iran. There, he was his team's top scorer.
