= Al-Gharafa SC (basketball) =

Al Gharafa Doha
- Nickname: Al Fuhud (The Cheetahs)
- Leagues: Qatari Basketball League
- Founded: 1979
- Location: Doha, Qatar
- Head coach: Kosay Hatem
- Championships: Qatari Championship (2)
- Website: Presentation at Asia-basket.com

Al Gharafa Doha is a Qatari professional basketball club. The club competes in the Qatari Basketball League.

The club has traditionally provided Qatar's national basketball team with key players.

== History ==
The team originally competed under the name Al-Ittihad and changed its name to Al-Gharafa before the 2005 season.

The team won the Qatari League in 2014.

== Players ==
=== Current roster ===
Note: Flags indicate national team eligibility at FIBA-sanctioned events. Players may hold other non-FIBA nationalities not displayed.

Al Gharafa roster
Players
Coaches

Pos.	No.	Nat.	Name	Ht.
F	0	(Qatar)	Ahmad Osman	1.98 m (6 ft 6 in)
F/C	1	(United States)	C. J. Aiken	2.06 m (6 ft 9 in)
F	6	(Qatar)	Nedim Muslic	1.97 m (6 ft 6 in)
G	7	(Qatar)	Azzam Abuisneenah	1.91 m (6 ft 3 in)
G	8	(United States)	Kenny Brown	1.88 m (6 ft 2 in)
SG	10	(Qatar)	Raslan Abdulla	1.88 m (6 ft 2 in)
G	12	(United States)	Antonio Wade	1.85 m (6 ft 1 in)
C	18	(Qatar)	Mohammed Yousuf	2.06 m (6 ft 9 in)
G	21	(Qatar)	Amr Elgohary	1.85 m (6 ft 1 in)
F	22	(Qatar)	Marlen Issaybayev	1.90 m (6 ft 3 in)
F	24	(Senegal)	Ousseynou Mbow	1.96 m (6 ft 5 in)
F	38	(Qatar)	Mohammed Ouiri	1.93 m (6 ft 4 in)

Head coach

- (Iraq) Kosay Hatem

Legend

- (C) Team captain
- Injured

== Notable players ==
- (Qatar) Khalid Abdalla Adam
- (United States) Mychal Ammons
- (United States) Wayne Arnold
- (United States) Marcus Banks
- (Serbia) Nemanja Bešović
- (United States) Suleiman Braimoh
- (United States) Jordan Callahan
- (United States) Devan Downey
- (United States) (Iraq) Kevin Galloway
- (United States) Dominic James
- (United States) (North Macedonia) Jeremiah Massey
- (Qatar) Abdulrahman Mohamed Saad
- (United States) Franklin Session
- (United States) Eugene Spates
- (United States) Mike Taylor
- (United States) Justin Watts

== See also ==
- Al-Gharafa Sports Club
