= Otgonbaataryn Sergelen =

Mongolian basketball player (born 1989)

Sergelen Otgonbaatar
SBL Khasyn Khuleguud Becks
- Position: Point guard
- League: Mongolian National Basketball Association

Personal information
- Born: January 9, 1990 (age 36)
- Listed height: 5 ft 10 in (1.78 m)

Career information
- College: Mongolian Railway College
- Playing career: 2012–present

Career history
- 2012–present: SBL Khasyn Khuleguud Becks
Medals
Men's 3x3 basketball
Representing Mongolia
Asian Beach Games
Bronze medal – third place	2012 Haiyang	Team

Otgonbaataryn Sergelen (born January 9, 1989) is a Mongolian professional basketball player. He currently plays for the SBL Khasyn Khuleguud Becks club of the Mongolian National Basketball Association (MNBA).

He went to the Mongolian Railway College in Ulaanbaatar.

Sergelen Otgonbaatar represented Mongolia's national basketball team at multiple occasions such as the 2011 East Asian Basketball Championships in China. Later, he represented Mongolia at the 2012 Asian Beach Games, also in China, where he led Mongolia to the bronze medal, the country's first basketball medal in history. At the 2014 Asian Games in South Korea, he was Mongolia's best passer as he averaged 2.8 assists per game.
