= Heo Il-young =

South Korean basketball player

Heo Il-young 허일영
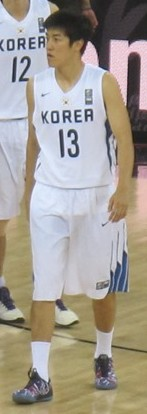

No. 11 – Changwon LG Sakers
- Position: Forward
- League: Korean Basketball League

Personal information
- Born: August 5, 1985 (age 41) Busan, South Korea
- Listed height: 6 ft 5 in (1.96 m)
- Listed weight: 201 lb (91 kg)

Career information
- High school: Dong-a High School
- College: Konkuk University
- Playing career: 2009–present

Career history
- 2009–2021: Daegu Orions / Goyang Orion Orions
- 2012–2014: → Sangmu (military service)
- 2021–2024: Seoul SK Knights
- 2024–: Changwon LG Sakers

Career highlights
- 3× KBL Championship (2016, 2022, 2025); KBL Playoffs Most Valuable Player Award (2025)
Medals
Representing South Korea
Men's basketball
Asian Games
Gold medal – first place	2014 Incheon	Team
Bronze medal – third place	2018 Jakarta–Palembang	Team
William Jones Cup
Silver medal – second place	2016 Taipei	Team

- Korean name
- Hangul: 허일영
- Hanja: 許日寧
- RR: Heo Ilyeong
- MR: Hŏ Iryŏng

Heo Il-young (born August 5, 1985) is a South Korean professional basketball player. He plays for Changwon LG Sakers in the Korean Basketball League and the South Korean national team.

== Early life ==
A native of Busan, Heo grew up playing baseball in elementary school. He was persuaded to switch sports in middle school due to his height and attended Dong-a High School, one of Busan's most notable high school basketball programs, where he was schoolmates with national teammate Kim Tae-sul. As he was taller than most of his peers in high school, he played as a center, before converting into a forward in college.

== Career ==
=== College ===
Heo went on to Konkuk University. During his senior year, he led the unfancied team to the final of the National Basketball Festival, a winter tournament contested by college teams and KBL D-League reserve teams, and was the tournament's top scorer.

=== Professional ===
Heo was the second overall pick of the 2009 KBL rookie draft and was chosen by Daegu Orions, which later moved to Goyang and became Goyang Orion Orions. Although he came from a lesser-known college basketball program, he emerged as the Orions' brightest prospects and dubbed the team's "solver" due to him scoring decisive points in the fourth quarter of crucial games. He finished his rookie season with an average of 10.5 points in 51 games.

In May 2012, Heo enlisted for mandatory military service and was assigned to the Sangmu team after completing basic training. He was discharged in January 2014.

During the 2019–20, Heo was plagued by a recurring hamstring injury which sidelined him for more than half the season's games. After the 2020-21 season ended, he became a free agent but chose not to renew with the Orions. He signed a three-year contract with Seoul SK Knights ahead of the 2021-22 season.

Following the conclusion of the 2023–24 KBL season, Heo Il-young entered free agency and signed a two-year contract with the Changwon LG Sakers on May 17, 2024. The agreement included an annual salary of ₩250 million for the first year. With the retirement of Kim Kang-seon, his former Goyang captain, at the end of that season, Heo remained the sole active player from the 2009 KBL draft class. With his 1985-born counterparts all having retired over the past few seasons, he and Ulsan Hyundai Mobis Phoebus captain Ham Ji-hoon became the two oldest registered players in the KBL.

In the 2024–25 season, Heo played a pivotal role in the LG Sakers' playoff run. His leadership and clutch performances were instrumental in the team's success, culminating in a historic victory in the KBL Finals. The Sakers clinched their first championship title in franchise history by defeating the Seoul SK Knights in a seven-game series. Heo's outstanding contributions during the playoffs earned him the Playoffs MVP, his first individual award. He became the first player to win the Championship with three different teams and the oldest recipient of the Playoffs MVP at age 39.

=== National team ===
In 2014, Heo participated in both the World Cup and the Asian Games. He was recalled for the 2018 Asian Games but missed out on the 2019 FIBA Basketball World Cup.

== Personal life ==
Heo married his girlfriend of three years in April 2016. They have two children, a son and a daughter.

Heo is a fan of his hometown KBO League team Lotte Giants and has been spotted attending their home matches.
