= Boney Watson =

American-Qatari basketball player

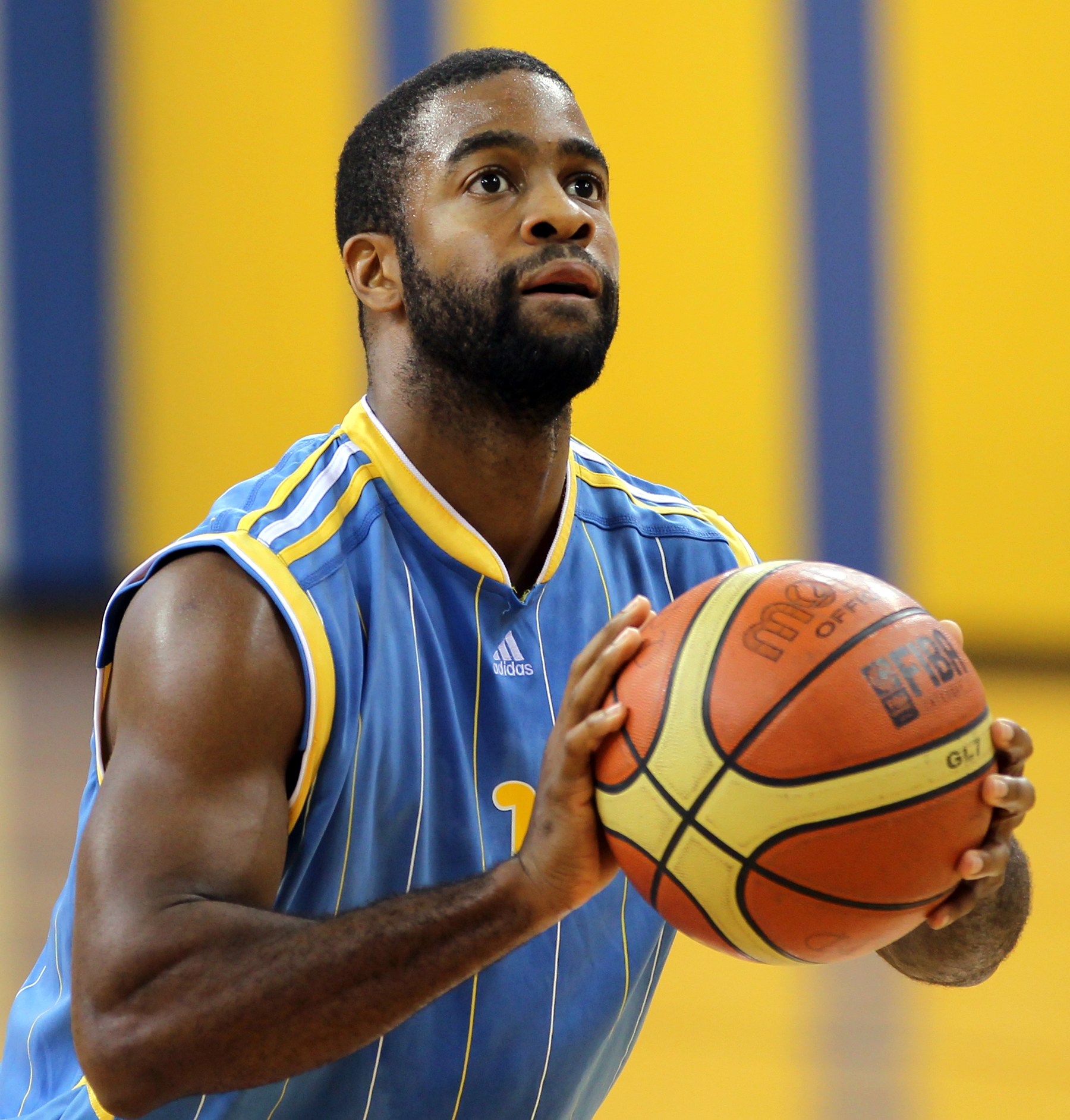
- Watson in 2012

Al-Rayyan
- Position: Point guard
- League: Qatari Basketball League

Personal information
- Born: March 26, 1978 (age 48) Lake City, Florida
- Listed height: 6 ft 0 in (1.83 m)
Medals
Representing Qatar
Men's 3x3 basketball
World championships
Gold medal – first place	2014 Moscow	Team
Asian championships
Gold medal – first place	2013 Doha	Team
Asian Beach Games
Gold medal – first place	2014 Phuket	Team

Boney Harold Watson (born March 26, 1978) is an American-Qatari basketball point guard. He was part of the Qatari team that won the 2013 FIBA Asia 3x3 Championship and 2014 FIBA 3x3 World Championships.
