= Al-Rayyan SC (basketball) =

Al Rayyan
- Nickname: The Lions; Al-Raheeb (The Fierce)
- Leagues: Qatari Basketball League; FIBA Asia Champions Cup
- Founded: 1970; 56 years ago
- Arena: Al Rayyan Indoor Arena
- Capacity: 2,000
- Location: Al-Rayyan, Qatar
- President: Sheikh Saud Bin Ali Al-Thani
- Head coach: Stergios Koufos
- Championships: Qatari Championship (18); Emir of Qatar Cup (9); Qatar Crown Prince Cup (6)
Home	Away

Al Rayyan Basketball Team (Arabic: فريق الريان لكرة السلة) is a Qatari professional basketball team based in Omm Alafai in the city of Al-Rayyan, Qatar. Al Rayyan is one of the most successful basketball clubs in Qatar, with many domestic and international titles to its name. It is part of the Al Rayyan Sports Club.

== History ==
=== Beginnings (1979–1998) ===
Al Rayyan Basketball Team participated in the league after the establishment of the Qatar Basketball Federation (QBF) headed by Mr. Nasser Al-Mubarak Al-Ali in 1979. They had to play in outside courts paved with cement as Al-Rayyan Sports Club, or any club for that matter, did not have air-conditioned halls at that time, meaning that the surface area would be very dangerous to play on. At a time while basketball was first being introduced to Qatar, there were only four other clubs competing in the basketball league.

A report published by QBF in 1982 stated the total number of basketball players in Al-Rayyan in 1970 was eight, with that number gradually decreasing throughout the decade, until 1974, when it was three. They were then coached by Sudanese Abdul Monem Salem. The game started to pick up in the early '80s after the formation of QBF. The playerbase increased, and South Korean coach Young-Suk was selected to bring the team glory. In the '80s, their team was one to be reckoned with, with the likes of Ahmed Mohammed Ali, the top scorer of the division in 1980–81, and Omar Mohammed, the top scorer of the youth division in the same year. Players were laid off in the mid-'80s, rendering the club ineligible to compete in the 1985–86 season. In 1988, the club had once again picked itself up again, with the juniors winning the 1988–89 and 1990–91 seasons. By 1992, the club had more than 95 players.

=== Golden era (1994–present) ===
The club was able to achieve its first league trophy in 1994 under the guidance of Colombian Coach Julio Salazar, being Assistant Coach Ahmed Abdul Hadi, Basketball Manager Rashid Tahkrooni and outstanding players Yasin Mahmoud, Abdullah Diab, Ebrahim Basheer, Mohamed Orabi, Khaled Suleman and Abdulaziz Tahkrooni. Sheikh Saud Bin Khaled Al-Thani, then-president of the Qatar Basketball Federation, awarded every player with a sum of 2,000 QR. In that first season with Coach Julio Salazar Rayyan Basketball won the Federation Cup, the Qatar Basketball League Dawry and the Emiry Cup. Coach Julio Salazar with Rayyan Club compiled a total of Ten Championships in the Professional Basketball League in Qatar and Four Championships in the Second Division Al Shabab in a period of four years. The team continued to show good performances in the basketball league throughout the new millennium, winning the Asia Champions Cup both in 2002 and 2005, as well as finishing runners-up in 2001, 2003, 2008 and 2010 and placed third in 2004, 2006, 2007 and 2011. They are the second most successful in the competition, and have the most total medals.

They have also had regional success, winning the Gulf Club Championship in 2002 and 2004, in addition to finishing runners-up three times: 2003, 2006 and 2011.

== Players ==
Note: Flags indicate national team eligibility at FIBA-sanctioned events. Players may hold other non-FIBA nationalities not displayed.

Al Rayyan roster
Players
Coaches

Pos.	No.	Nat.	Name	Ht.
PG	1	(Qatar)	Mohamed Abdelaziz	1.78 m (5 ft 10 in)
G	3	(Qatar)	Abdulaziz Al-Naemi	1.85 m (6 ft 1 in)
PG	4	(Qatar)	Jacey Cruz	1.75 m (5 ft 9 in)
G	6	(United States)	TJ Starks	1.88 m (6 ft 2 in)
G	7	(United States)	Malik Curry	1.85 m (6 ft 1 in)
F	8	(Qatar)	Tanguy Ngombo (C)	1.98 m (6 ft 6 in)
PG	10	(Qatar)	Abdulla Mousa	1.84 m (6 ft 0 in)
G	11	(Qatar)	Ibrahima Seck	1.83 m (6 ft 0 in)
C	12	(Qatar)	Meho Haracic	2.13 m (7 ft 0 in)
G	13	(Qatar)	Ali Tawfiq Abu	1.85 m (6 ft 1 in)
F	16	(Qatar)	Malek Saleem	1.96 m (6 ft 5 in)
F/C	21	(Senegal)	Mouhammad Faye	2.08 m (6 ft 10 in)
G/F	24	(Qatar)	Mizo Amin	1.93 m (6 ft 4 in)
PG	37	(Qatar)	Mohammed Al-Abdulrahman	1.78 m (5 ft 10 in)

Head coach

- (Greece) Stergios Koufos

Assistant coach(es)

- (Greece) Athanasios Molyvdas

Legend

- (C) Team captain
- Injured

== Honours ==
=== Domestic ===
- Qatari Championship

Winners (18): 1995–1996, 1996–1997, 1997–1998, 1998–1999, 1999–2000, 2001–2002, 2002–2003, 2003–2004, 2004–2005, 2005–2006, 2006–2007, 2008–2009, 2009–2010, 2010–2011, 2011–2012, 2014-2015, 2015-2016, 2022-2023

- Emir of Qatar Cup

Winners (9): 1993-1994, 1994-1995, 1998–1999, 1999-2000, 2003–2004, 2005–2006, 2009–2010, 2010–2011, 2012–2013

- Qatar Crown Prince Cup

Winners (6): 2001–2002, 2003–2004, 2004–2005, 2005–2006, 2007–2008, 2008–2009

=== International ===
- Gulf Club Championships

Winners (2): 2002, 2004

- FIBA Asia Champions Cup

Winners (2): 2002, 2005

== Managerial history ==
- (Qatar) Ahmed Hassan (1970–??)
- (Sudan) Abdul Monem Salem (c. 1974)
- (South Korea) Park Byung-suk (1979–80)
- (Qatar) Al-Ahmad (1980–82)
- (Egypt) Dr. Mustafa M Diab (1982–83)
- (Colombia) Julio Salazar (1993-1995)
- (Qatar) Ali Fakhro (c. 1998)
- (United States) Jack Olds (c. 1999)
- (Colombia) Julio Salazar (1999-2001)
- (Egypt) Ahmed Abdul Hadi (c. 2002)
- (United States) Willie Charles Richardson (2003–2004)
- (United States) Jaimie Angeli (2004–2007)
- (Australia) Brian Lester (2008–2009)
- (United States) Carl Nash (2009–2010)
- (United States) Russ Bergman (2010–2011)
- (United States) Brian Rowsom (2011–2014)
- (Australia) Brian Lester (2014)
- (Greece) Stergios Koufos (2014)

== Top league scorers each season ==
Season	Top scorer(s)	Points
1981	(Qatar) Ahmed Mohammed Ali	-
2011	(Qatar) (Republic of the Congo) Tanguy Ngombo	-
2012	(Qatar) (Republic of the Congo) Tanguy Ngombo	293

== Notable players ==
Qatar

- (Qatar) Yasseen Ismail
- (Qatar) Omer Abdelqader
- (Qatar) Erfan Ali Saeed
- (Qatar) (Republic of the Congo) Tanguy Ngombo

Jamaica

- (Jamaica) Kimani Ffriend

USA

- (United States) Tierre Brown
- (United States) Todd Day
- (United States) Charron Fisher
- (United States) A. J. Guyton
- (United States) Kris Johnson
- (United States) Marlon Parmer
- (United States) Boney Watson
- (United States) Suleiman Braimoh
- (United States) TJ Starks
