= Al Sadd Basketball Team =

Al Sadd
- Nickname: Al-Zaeem (The Boss); Al-Dheeb (The Wolf)
- Leagues: Qatari Basketball League
- Founded: 21 October 1969
- Arena: Jassim bin Hamad Indoor Hall
- Capacity: 4,000
- Location: Doha, Qatar
- Team colors: Black and White
- President: Khalid Abdulla Al-Tamimi
- Head coach: Vassilis Bratsiakos
- Championships: Qatari Championship (6); Emir of Qatar Cup (6); Qatar Crown Prince Cup (1)
- Website: Official website
Home	Away

Al Sadd Basketball Team (Arabic: فريق السد لكرة السلة) is a Qatari professional basketball team based in Doha, Qatar. Al Sadd Basketball Team is a branch of Sadd Sports Club, which is the most successful team in all of Qatar. The basketball team has won the Qatari Basketball League six times, its last in 2022, and the Emir of Qatar Cup six times.

== Honours ==
=== Domestic ===
- Qatari Championship

Winners (6): 1970, 1978, 1979, 1980, 2013, 2022

- Emir of Qatar Cup

Winners (6): 1980, 1981, 1989, 1991, 1996, 1999

- Qatar Crown Prince Cup

Winners (1): 2004

== Players ==
Note: Flags indicate national team eligibility at FIBA-sanctioned events. Players may hold other non-FIBA nationalities not displayed.

Al Sadd roster
Players
Coaches

Pos.	No.	Nat.	Name	Ht.
PG	1	(Qatar)	Omar Saad (C)	1.85 m (6 ft 1 in)
SG	2	(United States)	Vander Blue	1.93 m (6 ft 4 in)
F	3	(Qatar)	Mohamed Abed	1.94 m (6 ft 4 in)
F	5	(Qatar)	Babacar Dieng	1.96 m (6 ft 5 in)
SG	6	(Qatar)	Faisal Abuissa	1.88 m (6 ft 2 in)
PG	8	(Qatar)	Ahmed Mohamud	1.83 m (6 ft 0 in)
G	9	(Qatar)	Fahad Alojan	1.78 m (5 ft 10 in)
SG	10	(Libya)	Mohamed Sadi	1.94 m (6 ft 4 in)
C	12	(Qatar)	Sultan Abuissa	1.95 m (6 ft 5 in)
G	17	(Qatar)	Ahmad Mohamad	1.94 m (6 ft 4 in)
C	20	(United States)	Waverly Austin	2.11 m (6 ft 11 in)
F/C	34	(United States)	Clint Chapman	2.08 m (6 ft 10 in)

Head coach

- (Greece) Vassilis Bratsiakos

Legend

- (C) Team captain
- Injured

== Managerial history ==
- (United States) Bob Carroll (1987)
- (Kuwait) Abdulrahman Baker (1990)
- (Iraq) Mohammed Najjar (1997–1998)
- (Jordan) Samir Nassar (2005–2006)
- (Austria) John Wojtak (2008–2010)
- (Serbia) Zoran Krečković (2011–2012, 2014–2018)

== Notable players ==
- (Qatar) Youssef Al-Badr
- (Qatar) Abdulaziz Al Bakri
- (Qatar) Khaled Suliman
- (Qatar) Mohammed Awad
- (Qatar) Zayed Ali Baroud
- (Bahrain) Mohammed Yousef
- (Germany) Johannes Krug
- (Ivory Coast) (United States) Yessoufou Bassith
- (Iraq) Hassan Abdullah
- (Senegal) Dieng Bassirou
- (Senegal) Khalifa Diop Babacar
- (Serbia) (Philippines) Milan Vučićević
- (United States) Temi Soyebo
- (United States) Patrick Simpson
- (United States) Michael Sanders
- (United States) Curtis Haywood
- (United States) Christopher Garnett
- (United States) Jason Dixon
- (United States) Clint Deas
- (United States) Demond Cowins
- (United States) Michael Bell
- (United States) Michael Southall

== See also ==
- Al Sadd Handball Team
- Al Sadd Futsal Team
- Al Sadd Volleyball Team
