= Al-Wakrah SC (basketball) =

Al Wakrah
- Nickname: السماوي النواخذه "The Blue Wave" الموج الأزرق
- Leagues: Qatari Basketball League
- Founded: 1959
- Arena: Al Wakrah Indoor Hall
- Location: Al Wakrah, Qatar
- President: Sheikh Khalifa bin Hassan
- Head coach: Ihab Galal
Home	Away

Al Wakrah Basketball Team (Arabic: فريق كرة السلة الوكرة) is a professional basketball team based in the city of Al Wakrah, in southern Qatar. Al Wakrah's basketball team currently competes in the top tier of basketball, the Qatari Basketball League. It is part of the Al-Wakrah Sport Club multisport club.

== Honours ==
=== Domestic ===
- Emir of Qatar Cup

Runners-up (1): 2000–2001

== Notable players ==
To appear in this section a player must have either:

- Set a club record or won an individual award as a professional player.
- Played at least one official international match for his senior national team

- (Guam) Earnest Ross
- (Rwanda) Kenny Gasana
- (Togo) Jimmy Williams

== Managerial history ==
- (Egypt) Ihab Galal (2003–)

== See also ==
- Al-Wakrah Sport Club
- Qatari Basketball League
