= Qatari Basketball League =

Top-tier men's basketball league operating in Qatar

- Sport: Basketball
- Founded: 1979
- CEO: Sheikh Saoud bin Abdulrahman Al Thani
- No. of teams: 9
- Country: Qatar
- Continent: FIBA Asia (Asia)
- Most recent champion: Al-Arabi (11th title) (2025–26)
- Most titles: Al Rayyan (18 titles)
- Broadcasters: Al Jazeera Sports; Al Kass
- Feeder to: Basketball Champions League Asia; FIBA West Asia Super League; Arab Club Basketball Championship
- Website: Official website

The Qatari Basketball League (Arabic: الدوري القطري لكرة السلة) is the top-tier men's basketball league in Qatar. The winning team obtains the participation right to the FIBA West Asia Super League. The first official season took place in 1981/82. There is a second division and two domestic cup tournaments, the Emir of Qatar Cup and the Qatar Crown Prince Cup.

In the 2012–13 season, the league expanded for the first time in its history, going from 8 to 12 teams with the newly entered clubs including Lekhwiya, Al-Shamal Sports Club, Umm Salal SC, and Al-Khor Sports Club.

== Current clubs ==
As of the 2023–24 season.

Club	Location
Al Ahli	Doha
Al Arabi	Doha
Al Gharafa	Al-Gharafa
Al Rayyan	Al-Rayyan
Al Sadd	Al-Sadd, Doha
Al Wakrah	Al Wakrah
Qatar SC	Al Dafna, Doha
Al Shamal	Doha
Al Khor	Al Khor

== Championship history ==
- 1981–82: Al Arabi
- 1982–83: Al Arabi
- 1983–84: Al Arabi
- 1984–85: Al Arabi
- 1985–86: Al Arabi
- 1986–87: Qatar SC
- 1987–88: Qatar SC
- 1988–89: Qatar SC
- 1989–90: Qatar SC
- 1990–91: Qatar SC
- 1991–92: Al Arabi
- 1992–93: Qatar SC
- 1993–94: Al Arabi
- 1994–95: Qatar SC
- 1995–96: Al-Rayyan
- 1996–97: Al-Rayyan
- 1997–98: Al-Rayyan
- 1998–99: Al-Rayyan
- 1999–00: Al-Rayyan
- 2000–01: Al Ahli SC
- 2001–02: Al-Rayyan
- 2002–03: Al-Rayyan
- 2003–04: Al-Rayyan

- 2004–05: Al-Rayyan
- 2005–06: Al-Rayyan
- 2006–07: Al-Rayyan
- 2007–08: El Jaish
- 2008–09: Al-Rayyan
- 2009–10: Al-Rayyan
- 2010–11: Al-Rayyan
- 2011–12: Al-Rayyan
- 2012–13: Al Sadd
- 2013–14: Al-Gharafa
- 2014–15: Al-Rayyan
- 2015–16: Al-Rayyan
- 2016–17: El Jaish
- 2017–18: Al Arabi
- 2018–19: Al-Shamal
- 2019–20: Al-Shamal
- 2020–21: Al-Gharafa
- 2021–22: Al Sadd
- 2022–23: Al-Rayyan
- 2023–24: Al Arabi
- 2024–25: Al Arabi
- 2025–26: Al Arabi

== List of medal winners ==
Season	Champions	Score	Runners-up	Third place
2017–18	Al-Arabi (8)	61–59	Al-Wakrah	Qatar SC
2018–19	Al-Shamal	80–77	Al-Arabi	Qatar SC
2019–20	Al-Shamal (2)	81–70	Al-Gharafa	Al-Arabi
2020–21	Al-Gharafa (2)	89–71	Al-Shamal	Al-Arabi
2021–22	Al Sadd (6)	2–1	Al-Gharafa	Al-Wakrah
2022–23	Al-Rayyan (18)	75–68	Al-Shamal	Al Sadd
2023–24	Al-Arabi (9)	68–61	Al Ahli	
2024–25	Al-Arabi (10)	2–0	Al-Rayyan	Al Sadd
2025–26	Al-Arabi (11)	2–0	Al-Rayyan	Al Sadd

== Top-performing clubs ==
Club	Champions
Al-Rayyan	18
Al-Arabi	11
Qatar SC	7
Al Sadd	6
Al-Shamal	2
El Jaish	2
Al-Gharafa	2
Al Ahli	1

== Total titles won by town or city ==
Town or city	Number of titles	Clubs
Doha	29	Al Arabi (11), Qatar SC (7), El Jaish (2), Al Ahli SC (1), Al Sadd (6), Al-Gharafa (2)
Al Rayyan	18	Al Rayyan (18)

== Domestic competitions ==
=== Qatar Crown Prince Cup ===
- 1999–2000 : Al Ahli SC d. Al-Rayyan
- 2000–01 : Al Ahli SC d. Al Sadd
- 2001–02 : Al-Rayyan d. Qatar SC
- 2002–03 : Qatar SC d. Al-Rayyan
- 2003–04 : Al-Rayyan d. Qatar SC
- 2004–05 : Al-Rayyan d. Al Sadd
- 2005–06 : Al-Rayyan d. Al Gharafa

- 2006–07 : Al Arabi d. Al Sadd
- 2007–08 : Al-Rayyan d. Qatar SC
- 2008–09 : Al-Rayyan d. Qatar SC
- 2009–10 : El Jaish d. Al Gharafa
- 2010–11 : Al Gharafa d. Al Sadd
- 2011–12 : Al Arabi d. El Jaish

=== Emir of Qatar Cup ===
- 2000 : Al-Rayyan d. Al Arabi
- 2001 : Al-Rayyan d. Al Wakrah
- 2002 : Qatar SC d. Al-Rayyan
- 2003 : Al-Rayyan d. Qatar SC
- 2004 : Al Sadd d. Al-Rayyan
- 2005 : Al-Rayyan d. Al Arabi

- 2006 : Al-Rayyan d. Al Arabi
- 2007 : Qatar SC d. Al Sadd
- 2008 : Al-Rayyan d. Qatar SC
- 2009 : Al-Rayyan d. Qatar SC
- 2010 : Al Gharafa d. Al-Rayyan
- 2011 : Al Gharafa d. Al-Rayyan

- 2012 : Al Rayyan d. Al Sadd
- 2013 : Al Rayyan d. Al Sadd
- 2014 : Al Gharafa d. El Jaish
- 2015 : El Jaish d. Al Sadd
- 2016 : El Jaish d. Al Gharafa

== See also ==
- FIBA Asia Champions Cup
