= 2025 FIBA Asia Cup squads =

The lists below were the official squads that competed at the 2025 FIBA Asia Cup.

== Group A ==
=== Australia ===
The roster was announced on 29 June 2025.

Australia men's national basketball team – 2025 FIBA Asia Cup roster
Players
Coaches

Pos.	No.	Name	Age – Date of birth	Height	Club	Ctr.
C	1	Harry Wessels	22 – 6 August 2002	2.15 m (7 ft 1 in)	Saint Mary's Gaels	(United States)
PG	2	Reyne Smith	22 – 28 October 2002	1.86 m (6 ft 1 in)	Louisville Cardinals	(United States)
PG	4	Dash Daniels	17 – 18 December 2007	1.95 m (6 ft 5 in)	Melbourne United	(Australia)
F	6	William Hickey	26 – 18 January 1999	1.94 m (6 ft 4 in)	Illawarra Hawks	(Australia)
PG	7	Owen Foxwell	21 – 17 August 2003	1.88 m (6 ft 2 in)	South East Melbourne Phoenix	(Australia)
G	9	Jaylin Galloway	22 – 21 December 2002	1.97 m (6 ft 6 in)	Sydney Kings	(Australia)
F	10	Xavier Cooks	29 – 19 August 1995	2.03 m (6 ft 8 in)	Sydney Kings	(Australia)
PF	13	Josh Bannan	24 – 26 February 2001	2.08 m (6 ft 10 in)	Brisbane Bullets	(Australia)
SF	14	Jack White	28 – 5 August 1997	2.00 m (6 ft 7 in)	Melbourne United	(Australia)
SF	17	Jack McVeigh	29 – 27 June 1996	2.03 m (6 ft 8 in)	Houston Rockets	(United States)
F	21	Ben Henshall	21 – 22 June 2004	2.00 m (6 ft 7 in)	Perth Wildcats	(Australia)
C	22	Will Magnay (C)	27 – 10 June 1998	2.08 m (6 ft 10 in)	Tasmania JackJumpers	(Australia)

Head coach

- (Australia) Adam Caporn

Assistant coach(es)

- (United States) Garrett Jackson
- (Australia) David Patrick
- (Australia) Dean Vickerman

Legend

- (C) Team captain
- Club – describes last
  club before the tournament
- Age – describes age
  on 5 August 2025

=== Lebanon ===
The roster was announced on 29 July 2025.

Lebanon men's national basketball team – 2025 FIBA Asia Cup roster
Players
Coaches

Pos.	No.	Name	Age – Date of birth	Height	Club	Ctr.
SF	1	Omar Jamaleddine	25 – 13 June 2000	1.92 m (6 ft 4 in)	Kawasaki Brave Thunders	(Japan)
SG	5	Amir Saoud (C)	34 – 18 January 1991	1.87 m (6 ft 2 in)	Al Riyadi	(Lebanon)
SG	7	Karim Zeinoun	26 – 16 June 1999	1.88 m (6 ft 2 in)	Al Riyadi	(Lebanon)
SG	9	Sergio El Darwich	29 – 25 July 1996	1.94 m (6 ft 4 in)	Beirut Club	(Lebanon)
PG	10	Ali Mansour	27 – 1 January 1998	1.85 m (6 ft 1 in)	Al Riyadi	(Lebanon)
PF	11	Dedric Lawson (NP)	27 – 1 October 1997	2.06 m (6 ft 9 in)	Xinjiang Flying Tigers	(China)
PG	20	Wael Arakji	30 – 4 September 1994	1.93 m (6 ft 4 in)	Al-Ula	(Saudi Arabia)
F	23	Youssef Khayat	22 – 11 March 2003	2.05 m (6 ft 9 in)	Sagesse	(Lebanon)
PF	24	Hayk Gyokchyan	35 – 11 December 1989	2.03 m (6 ft 8 in)	Al Riyadi	(Lebanon)
PG	25	Ali Mezher	31 – 22 March 1994	1.82 m (6 ft 0 in)	Akita Northern Happinets	(Japan)
C	34	Gerard Hadidian	30 – 21 April 1995	2.02 m (6 ft 8 in)	Sagesse	(Lebanon)
PF	40	Ali Haidar	35 – 20 July 1990	2.06 m (6 ft 9 in)	Mariste	(Lebanon)

Head coach

- (Serbia) Miodrag Perišić

Assistant coach(es)

- (Serbia) Marko Filipovic

Legend

- (C) Team captain
- (NP) Naturalized player
- Club – describes last
  club before the tournament
- Age – describes age
  on 5 August 2025

=== Qatar ===
The roster was announced on 2 August 2025.

Qatar men's national basketball team – 2025 FIBA Asia Cup roster
Players
Coaches

Pos.	No.	Name	Age – Date of birth	Height	Club	Ctr.
G	0	Brandon Goodwin (NP)	29 – 2 October 1995	1.83 m (6 ft 0 in)	Free agent
F	1	Tyler Harris	31 – 1 September 1993	2.01 m (6 ft 7 in)	Al-Rayyan	(Qatar)
G	3	Mahmoud Luay Darwish	22 – 2 April 2003	1.91 m (6 ft 3 in)	Al Ahli SC	(Qatar)
G	4	Abdulrahman Saad (C)	29 – 2 July 1996	1.90 m (6 ft 3 in)	Al-Arabi SC	(Qatar)
C	5	Seydou Ndoye	26 – 10 May 1999	2.03 m (6 ft 8 in)	Al Sadd	(Qatar)
C	8	Zine Eddine Bedri	22 – 15 October 2002	2.08 m (6 ft 10 in)	Columbia Lions	(United States)
PG	13	Omar Saad	25 – 13 May 2000	1.84 m (6 ft 0 in)	Al-Wakrah SC	(Qatar)
F	14	Mohammed Abbasher	21 – 6 July 2004	2.01 m (6 ft 7 in)	Al Ahli SC	(Qatar)
C	19	Moustapha Ndao	20 – 27 April 2005	1.88 m (6 ft 2 in)	Al Ahli SC	(Qatar)
F	23	Babacar Dieng	27 – 17 September 1997	1.96 m (6 ft 5 in)	Al Sadd	(Qatar)
C	33	Bobo Magassa	24 – 4 September 2000	1.98 m (6 ft 6 in)	Al-Rayyan	(Qatar)
C	44	Alen Hadžibegović	26 – 19 March 1999	2.11 m (6 ft 11 in)	BC Lietkabelis	(Lithuania)

Head coach

- (Turkey) Hakan Demir

Assistant coach(es)

- (Turkey) Cengiz Karadağ

Legend

- (C) Team captain
- (NP) Naturalized player
- Club – describes last
  club before the tournament
- Age – describes age
  on 5 August 2025

=== South Korea ===
The roster was announced on 21 July 2025.

South Korea men's national basketball team – 2025 FIBA Asia Cup roster
Players
Coaches

Pos.	No.	Name	Age – Date of birth	Height	Club	Ctr.
C	0	Ha Yun-gi	26 – 12 March 1999	2.03 m (6 ft 8 in)	Suwon KT Sonicboom	(South Korea)
F	1	Lee Hyun-jung	24 – 23 October 2000	2.00 m (6 ft 7 in)	Nagasaki Velca	(Japan)
G	3	Jeong Seong-woo	31 – 17 August 1993	1.78 m (5 ft 10 in)	Daegu KOGAS Pegasus	(South Korea)
G	5	Yang Jun-seok	23 – 7 December 2001	1.80 m (5 ft 11 in)	Changwon LG Sakers	(South Korea)
G	6	Park Ji-hoon	30 – 21 January 1995	1.82 m (6 ft 0 in)	Anyang JKJ Red Boosters	(South Korea)
G	7	Yu Ki-sang	24 – 17 April 2001	1.88 m (6 ft 2 in)	Changwon LG Sakers	(South Korea)
G	9	Lee Jung-hyun	26 – 14 April 1999	1.90 m (6 ft 3 in)	Goyang Sono Skygunners	(South Korea)
F	11	Lee Woo-suk	26 – 10 July 1999	1.96 m (6 ft 5 in)	Sangmu	(South Korea)
F	12	Moon Jeong-hyeon	24 – 30 July 2001	1.95 m (6 ft 5 in)	Suwon KT Sonicboom	(South Korea)
C	15	Kim Jong-kyu (C)	34 – 3 July 1991	2.07 m (6 ft 9 in)	Anyang JKJ Red Boosters	(South Korea)
PF	22	Yeo Jun-seok	23 – 19 March 2002	2.02 m (6 ft 8 in)	Seattle Redhawks	(United States)
C	33	Lee Seoung-hyun	33 – 16 April 1992	1.97 m (6 ft 6 in)	Ulsan Hyundai Mobis Phoebus	(South Korea)

Head coach

- (South Korea) Ahn Joon-ho

Assistant coach(es)

- (South Korea) Seo Dong-chul

Legend

- (C) Team captain
- Club – describes last
  club before the tournament
- Age – describes age
  on 5 August 2025

== Group B ==
=== Guam ===
The roster was announced on 5 August 2025.

Guam men's national basketball team – 2025 FIBA Asia Cup roster
Players
Coaches

Pos.	No.	Name	Age – Date of birth	Height	Club	Ctr.
	0	Zander Kamai	20 – 1 July 2005	1.91 m (6 ft 3 in)	Barrigada Crusaders	(Guam)
F	3	Mark Johnson Jr.	32 – 19 October 1992	1.98 m (6 ft 6 in)	Barrigada Crusaders	(Guam)
C	5	Jonathan Galloway	29 – 19 June 1996	2.11 m (6 ft 11 in)	APOEL BC	(Cyprus)
G	21	Blaise Ada	20 – 1 January 2005	1.75 m (5 ft 9 in)	Father Duenas Memorial	(Guam)
PF	24	Ben Borja II	27 – 26 February 1998	2.01 m (6 ft 7 in)	California Maritime	(United States)
SG	30	Gabriel Simon	25 – 10 March 2000	1.88 m (6 ft 2 in)	Veltex Shizuoka	(Japan)
F	33	Earnest Ross	34 – 27 January 1991	1.96 m (6 ft 5 in)	Shonan United	(Japan)
PF	35	Matthew Fegurgur	23 – 4 September 2001	2.08 m (6 ft 10 in)	Long Beach State Beach	(United States)
SG	39	Jericho Cruz	34 – 11 October 1990	1.90 m (6 ft 3 in)	San Miguel Beermen	(Philippines)
F	42	Tai Wesley (C)	39 – 13 May 1986	1.93 m (6 ft 4 in)	South East Melbourne Phoenix	(Australia)

Head coach

- (United States) EJ Calvo

Assistant coach(es)

- (Guam) Chris Fernandez
- (Guam) Danny Payumo

Legend

- (C) Team captain
- Club – describes last
  club before the tournament
- Age – describes age
  on 5 August 2025

=== Iran ===
The roster was announced on 30 July 2025.

Iran men's national basketball team – 2025 FIBA Asia Cup roster
Players
Coaches

Pos.	No.	Name	Age – Date of birth	Height	Club	Ctr.
G	3	Sina Vahedi	24 – 8 January 2001	1.85 m (6 ft 1 in)	Tabiat Eslamshahr	(Iran)
PG	5	Mobin Sheikhi	28 – 15 March 1997	1.75 m (5 ft 9 in)	Shahrdari Gorgan	(Iran)
F	6	Mohammad Amini	20 – 26 April 2005	2.01 m (6 ft 7 in)	SLUC Nancy Basket	(France)
F	7	Navid Rezaeifar	28 – 23 August 1996	1.88 m (6 ft 2 in)	Shimidor	(Iran)
G	11	Mohammad Mehdi Heydari	19 – 28 April 2006	1.96 m (6 ft 5 in)	Mahgol Alborz	(Iran)
PF	12	Arman Zangeneh	32 – 15 June 1993	2.05 m (6 ft 9 in)	Tabiat Eslamshahr	(Iran)
PF	14	Arsalan Kazemi (C)	35 – 22 April 1990	2.02 m (6 ft 8 in)	Shahrdari Gorgan	(Iran)
F	17	Matin Aghajanpour	24 – 14 March 2001	1.98 m (6 ft 6 in)	Kalleh Mazandaran	(Iran)
PF	23	Mohammad Mehdi Rahimi	22 – 24 June 2003	2.02 m (6 ft 8 in)	Palayesh Naft Abadan	(Iran)
C	32	Hassan Aliakbari	29 – 7 July 1996	2.18 m (7 ft 2 in)	Tabiat	(Iran)
C	51	Salar Monji	28 – 10 April 1997	2.07 m (6 ft 9 in)	Shimidor	(Iran)
PG	55	Mahdi Jafari	21 – 4 October 2003	1.87 m (6 ft 2 in)	Mahgol Alborz	(Iran)

Head coach

- (Greece) Sotiris Manolopoulos

Assistant coach(es)

- (Iran) Mohammad Kasaeepour
- (Iran) Farzad Kouhian

Legend

- (C) Team captain
- Club – describes last
  club before the tournament
- Age – describes age
  on 5 August 2025

=== Japan ===
The roster was announced on 1 August 2025.

Japan men's national basketball team – 2025 FIBA Asia Cup roster
Players
Coaches

Pos.	No.	Name	Age – Date of birth	Height	Club	Ctr.
PG	2	Yuki Togashi	32 – 30 July 1993	1.67 m (5 ft 6 in)	Chiba Jets	(Japan)
SF	4	Akira Jacobs	21 – 13 April 2004	2.03 m (6 ft 8 in)	Fordham Rams	(United States)
PG	7	Kai Toews	26 – 17 September 1998	1.88 m (6 ft 2 in)	Alvark Tokyo	(Japan)
SF	13	Ren Kanechika	22 – 11 March 2003	1.96 m (6 ft 5 in)	Chiba Jets	(Japan)
C	14	Kano Toyoshige	23 – 6 October 2001	2.06 m (6 ft 9 in)	Sun Rockers Shibuya	(Japan)
SF	18	Yudai Baba	29 – 7 November 1995	1.95 m (6 ft 5 in)	Nagasaki Velca	(Japan)
SG	19	Yudai Nishida	26 – 13 March 1999	1.90 m (6 ft 3 in)	SeaHorses Mikawa	(Japan)
PG	23	John Harper Jr.	22 – 9 February 2003	1.81 m (5 ft 11 in)	Sun Rockers Shibuya	(Japan)
C	24	Josh Hawkinson (C, NP)	30 – 23 June 1995	2.08 m (6 ft 10 in)	Sun Rockers Shibuya	(Japan)
G	30	Keisei Tominaga	24 – 1 February 2001	1.88 m (6 ft 2 in)	Levanga Hokkaido	(Japan)
SF	91	Hirotaka Yoshii	27 – 4 June 1998	1.96 m (6 ft 5 in)	San-en NeoPhoenix	(Japan)
C	99	Koya Kawamata	27 – 16 June 1998	2.04 m (6 ft 8 in)	Nagasaki Velca	(Japan)

Head coach

- (United States) Tom Hovasse

Assistant coach(es)

- (Japan) Geoffrey Katsuhisa
- (Japan) Norio Sassa

Legend

- (C) Team captain
- (NP) Naturalized player
- Club – describes last
  club before the tournament
- Age – describes age
  on 5 August 2025

=== Syria ===
Syria men's national basketball team – 2025 FIBA Asia Cup roster
Players
Coaches

Pos.	No.	Name	Age – Date of birth	Height	Club	Ctr.
SG	00	Mohammad Albalbisi	18 – 31 July 2007	1.84 m (6 ft 0 in)	Al Wahda	(Syria)
SG	0	George Nounou	25 – 15 January 2000	1.82 m (6 ft 0 in)	Jalaa SC	(Syria)
G	1	Anthouny Bakar	31 – 10 January 1994	1.98 m (6 ft 6 in)	Al-Ittihad	(Syria)
SF	2	Omar Idelbi	26 – 13 July 1999	1.94 m (6 ft 4 in)	Al Wahda	(Syria)
G	4	George Dolmaye	23 – 1 January 2002	1.89 m (6 ft 2 in)	Al Jalaa	(Syria)
G	5	Keron DeShields (NP)	32 – 4 December 1992	1.91 m (6 ft 3 in)	Al-Ittihad	(Saudi Arabia)
PF	7	Kamel Abdulla	25 – 25 January 2000	2.02 m (6 ft 8 in)	Al Jalaa	(Syria)
PG	8	Majd Arbasha	35 – 21 April 1990	1.87 m (6 ft 2 in)	Al Wahda	(Syria)
PF	13	Mohamad Bilal Atli	30 – 1 January 1995	2.03 m (6 ft 8 in)	Al-Ittihad	(Syria)
PF	21	Omar Cheikh Ali	34 – 1 January 1991	2.04 m (6 ft 8 in)	Al-Karamah	(Syria)
PF	23	Hani Adribi (C)	34 – 4 October 1990	2.04 m (6 ft 8 in)	Al Wahda	(United Arab Emirates)
PF	33	Christian James Maran	26 – 1 December 1998	2.00 m (6 ft 7 in)	Al Wahda	(Syria)

Head coach

- (United States) Joseph Stiebing

Assistant coach(es)

- (Syria) Oday Al-Khabbaz
- (Syria) Ali Marhoon
- (Syria) Fawaz Mreish

Legend

- (C) Team captain
- (NP) Naturalized player
- Club – describes last
  club before the tournament
- Age – describes age
  on 5 August 2025

== Group C ==
=== China ===
China men's national basketball team – 2025 FIBA Asia Cup roster
Players
Coaches

Pos.	No.	Name	Age – Date of birth	Height	Club	Ctr.
G	0	Gao Shiyan	29 – 22 January 1996	1.86 m (6 ft 1 in)	Shandong Hi-Speed Kirin	(China)
PG	3	Hu Mingxuan	27 – 10 March 1998	1.93 m (6 ft 4 in)	Guangdong Southern Tigers	(China)
PG	5	Liao Sanning	24 – 29 January 2001	1.91 m (6 ft 3 in)	Beijing Royal Fighters	(China)
SG	6	Cheng Shuaipeng	26 – 3 June 1999	1.91 m (6 ft 3 in)	Zhejiang Golden Bulls	(China)
G	8	Zhao Rui (C)	29 – 14 January 1996	1.95 m (6 ft 5 in)	Xinjiang Flying Tigers	(China)
PF	10	Wang Junjie	20 – 3 April 2005	2.06 m (6 ft 9 in)	San Francisco Dons	(United States)
C	11	Yu Jiahao	22 – 18 March 2003	2.21 m (7 ft 3 in)	Zhejiang Golden Bulls	(China)
F	17	Zhao Jiayi	26 – 6 January 1999	2.02 m (6 ft 8 in)	Qingdao Eagles	(China)
C	21	Hu Jinqiu	25 – 24 September 1999	2.10 m (6 ft 11 in)	Zhejiang Lions	(China)
SF	26	Zhu Junlong	28 – 13 July 1997	2.01 m (6 ft 7 in)	Zhejiang Lions	(China)
PF	35	Li Xiangbo	25 – 22 October 1999	2.03 m (6 ft 8 in)	Guangzhou Loong Lions	(China)
F	39	Lei Meng	30 – 4 August 1995	1.95 m (6 ft 5 in)	Beijing Ducks	(China)

Head coach

- (China) Guo Shiqiang

Assistant coach(es)

- (China) Li Ang
- (Spain) Joaquín Ruiz Lorente
- (Spain) Ángel Sánchez-Cañete
- (China) Wang Han

Legend

- (C) Team captain
- Club – describes last
  club before the tournament
- Age – describes age
  on 5 August 2025

=== India ===
India men's national basketball team – 2025 FIBA Asia Cup roster
Players
Coaches

Pos.	No.	Name	Age – Date of birth	Height	Club	Ctr.
PG	1	Sahaij Sekhon	23 – 1 September 2001	1.94 m (6 ft 4 in)	Chandigarh Warriors	(India)
SG	5	Harsh Dagar	20 – 23 February 2005	1.89 m (6 ft 2 in)	Uttar Pradesh	(India)
PG	7	Muin Bek Hafeez (C)	29 – 16 March 1996	1.89 m (6 ft 2 in)	Tamil Nadu	(India)
SG	8	Kanwar Sandhu	25 – 30 October 1999	1.85 m (6 ft 1 in)	Punjab Warriors	(India)
PG	10	Arvind Muthu Krishnan	25 – 16 March 2000	1.87 m (6 ft 2 in)	Tamil Nadu	(India)
C	12	Princepal Singh	24 – 3 January 2001	2.08 m (6 ft 10 in)	Indian Railways	(India)
C	15	Palpreet Singh Brar	31 – 3 January 1994	2.10 m (6 ft 11 in)	Indian Railways	(India)
PF	17	Pratyanshu Tomar	25 – 17 June 2000	2.03 m (6 ft 8 in)	Karnataka	(India)
SF	19	Pranav Prince	22 – 19 June 2003	2.00 m (6 ft 7 in)	Tamil Nadu	(India)
C	23	Amaan Sandhu	22 – 8 December 2002	2.11 m (6 ft 11 in)	Punjab Warriors	(India)
PF	24	Arvinder Singh	22 – 3 December 2002	2.00 m (6 ft 7 in)	Indian Railways	(India)
SG	34	Vaisakh Karimbingal Manoj	23 – 19 July 2002	1.90 m (6 ft 3 in)	Kerala	(India)

Head coach

- (United States) Scott Flemming

Assistant coach(es)

- (India) Rama Gantupalli
- (India) Sambhaji Kadam

Legend

- (C) Team captain
- Club – describes last
  club before the tournament
- Age – describes age
  on 5 August 2025

=== Jordan ===
The roster was announced on 3 August 2025.

Jordan men's national basketball team – 2025 FIBA Asia Cup roster
Players
Coaches

Pos.	No.	Name	Age – Date of birth	Height	Club	Ctr.
G	0	Abdullah Olajuwon	21 – 11 February 2004	1.96 m (6 ft 5 in)	Kilgore	(United States)
SG	2	Dar Tucker (NP)	37 – 11 April 1988	1.90 m (6 ft 3 in)	Free agent
F	3	Abdul Rahman Olajuwon	19 – 18 December 2005	2.03 m (6 ft 8 in)	Tyler	(United States)
PG	5	Freddy Ibrahim	28 – 14 October 1996	1.90 m (6 ft 3 in)	Orthodox Club	(Jordan)
SF	7	Ahmad Al-Hamarsheh (C)	38 – 10 October 1986	1.96 m (6 ft 5 in)	Al-Wehdat	(Jordan)
G	11	Yazan Al Taweel	31 – 7 August 1993	1.90 m (6 ft 3 in)	Kofryouba	(Jordan)
C	12	Yousef Abu Wazaneh	31 – 6 December 1993	2.00 m (6 ft 7 in)	Orthodox Club	(Jordan)
C	14	Khaled Abu Aboud	28 – 22 May 1997	2.02 m (6 ft 8 in)	Kofryouba	(Jordan)
SF	17	Rawhi Kilani	18 – 25 August 2006	1.90 m (6 ft 3 in)	Amman United	(Spain)
SF	21	Hashem Abbas	26 – 30 March 1999	1.90 m (6 ft 3 in)	Al-Ahli	(Jordan)
PG	22	Malek Kannan	32 – 7 February 1993	1.85 m (6 ft 1 in)	Al-Ahli	(Jordan)
C	31	Faris Mucharbach	19 – 30 July 2006	2.12 m (6 ft 11 in)	UNLV Runnin' Rebels	(United States)

Head coach

- (Canada) Roy Rana

Assistant coach(es)

- (Jordan) Nayef Asfour
- (Germany) Henrik Rödl

Legend

- (C) Team captain
- (NP) Naturalized player
- Club – describes last
  club before the tournament
- Age – describes age
  on 5 August 2025

=== Saudi Arabia ===
Saudi Arabia men's national basketball team – 2025 FIBA Asia Cup roster
Players
Coaches

Pos.	No.	Name	Age – Date of birth	Height	Club	Ctr.
PG	00	Marzouq Al-Muwallad	32 – 6 August 1992	1.83 m (6 ft 0 in)	Al-Ahli	(Saudi Arabia)
C	4	Mohammed Al-Marwani (C)	36 – 24 April 1989	2.06 m (6 ft 9 in)	Al-Ittihad	(Saudi Arabia)
SG	5	Muhammad-Ali Abdur-Rahkman (NP)	30 – 1 September 1994	1.93 m (6 ft 4 in)	Bilbao	(Spain)
F	6	Mathna Almarwani	33 – 1 January 1992	1.92 m (6 ft 4 in)	Al-Ittihad	(Saudi Arabia)
PG	7	Mohammed Alsager	39 – 19 October 1985	1.82 m (6 ft 0 in)	Al-Ula	(Saudi Arabia)
SG	8	Fahad Belal	34 – 30 April 1991	1.86 m (6 ft 1 in)	Al-Ittihad	(Saudi Arabia)
G	10	Khalid Abdel Gabar	34 – 4 December 1990	1.83 m (6 ft 0 in)	Al Hilal	(Saudi Arabia)
C	12	Mohammed Alsuwailem	27 – 2 March 1998	2.08 m (6 ft 10 in)	Al-Ula	(Saudi Arabia)
SF	20	Ali Shubayli	29 – 18 January 1996	1.90 m (6 ft 3 in)	Al-Ahli	(Saudi Arabia)
SG	24	Manaf Mustafa Alsalem	22 – 7 July 2003	1.94 m (6 ft 4 in)	Al-Khowildiah	(Saudi Arabia)
F	35	Thamer Mahmoud Mohammed	28 – 19 May 1997	1.95 m (6 ft 5 in)	Al-Ahli	(Saudi Arabia)
PF	99	Musad Tariq Kadi	25 – 11 August 1999	1.96 m (6 ft 5 in)	Al-Nassr	(Saudi Arabia)

Head coach

- (Spain) Ricard Casas

Assistant coach(es)

- (Spain) Jordi Guardia
- (Lebanon) Krikor Krikorian

Legend

- (C) Team captain
- (NP) Naturalized player
- Club – describes last
  club before the tournament
- Age – describes age
  on 5 August 2025

== Group D ==
=== Chinese Taipei ===
Chinese Taipei men's national basketball team – 2025 FIBA Asia Cup roster
Players
Coaches

Pos.	No.	Name	Age – Date of birth	Height	Club	Ctr.
SG	0	Lin Ting-chien	25 – 31 October 1999	1.90 m (6 ft 3 in)	Tianjin Pioneers	(China)
F	1	Mohammad Gadiaga	27 – 27 April 1998	1.88 m (6 ft 2 in)	Akita Northern Happinets	(Japan)
SF	2	Ma Chien-hao	24 – 29 April 2001	2.01 m (6 ft 7 in)	Formosa Dreamers	(Chinese Taipei)
G	4	Robert Tsang Hinton	19 – 20 February 2006	1.96 m (6 ft 5 in)	Harvard Crimson	(United States)
F	5	Liu Cheng (C)	34 – 24 November 1990	1.92 m (6 ft 4 in)	Shanghai Sharks	(China)
G	8	Adam Tsang Hinton	22 – 9 July 2003	1.93 m (6 ft 4 in)	Cornell Cornell Big Red	(United States)
G	9	Chen Ying-chun	32 – 9 June 1993	1.81 m (5 ft 11 in)	Beijing Ducks	(China)
C	10	Hu Long-mao	32 – 22 December 1992	1.94 m (6 ft 4 in)	Kaohsiung Aquas	(Chinese Taipei)
C	34	Brandon Gilbeck (NP)	28 – 9 December 1996	2.13 m (7 ft 0 in)	Formosa Dreamers	(Chinese Taipei)
G	55	Gao Jin-wei	24 – 23 October 2000	1.70 m (5 ft 7 in)	Taoyuan Taiwan Beer Leopards	(Chinese Taipei)
C	62	Chen Kuan-chuan	31 – 30 December 1993	1.95 m (6 ft 5 in)	Taoyuan Pauian Pilots	(Chinese Taipei)
C	88	Tseng Hsiang-chun	26 – 8 August 1998	2.00 m (6 ft 7 in)	Fighting Eagles Nagoya	(Japan)

Head coach

- (Italy) Gianluca Tucci

Assistant coach(es)

- (Chinese Taipei) Yang Che-yi
- (Chinese Taipei) Yang I-feng

Legend

- (C) Team captain
- (NP) Naturalized player
- Club – describes last
  club before the tournament
- Age – describes age
  on 5 August 2025

=== Iraq ===
The roster was announced on 4 August 2025.

Iraq men's national basketball team – 2025 FIBA Asia Cup roster
Players
Coaches

Pos.	No.	Name	Age – Date of birth	Height	Club	Ctr.
C	0	Ihab Al-Zuhairi	27 – 24 April 1998	2.10 m (6 ft 11 in)	Air Defence SC	(Iraq)
SG	00	DeMario Mayfield (NP)	34 – 23 May 1991	1.90 m (6 ft 3 in)	Latina Basket	(Italy)
SG	1	Thulfiqar Hammoodi	32 – 6 August 1992	1.96 m (6 ft 5 in)	Air Defence SC	(Iraq)
PG	2	Mohammed Almahdi Abbas	24 – 20 January 2001	1.80 m (5 ft 11 in)		(Iraq)
C	3	Abdulla Hayder Alibraheemi	21 – 11 August 2003	2.05 m (6 ft 9 in)	Dijlah University College	(Iraq)
SF	6	Ali Alaa Hussein Al-Musawi	19 – 6 April 2006	2.00 m (6 ft 7 in)	Al-Hilla	(Iraq)
SG	7	Hassan Abdullah	33 – 4 February 1992	1.88 m (6 ft 2 in)	Al-Shorta	(Iraq)
F	14	Mohammed Falih Nali	25 – 15 May 2000	1.80 m (5 ft 11 in)	Al-Naft	(Iraq)
C	15	Mohammed Al-Khafaji	34 – 9 July 1991	2.09 m (6 ft 10 in)	Al-Shorta	(Iraq)
PF	24	Ali Ismael (C)	35 – 13 August 1989	2.00 m (6 ft 7 in)	Air Defence SC	(Iraq)
G	31	Abbas Alqarnami	27 – 15 August 1997		Air Defence SC	(Iraq)
G	33	Diar Ahmed Abdul Allah	25 – 17 July 2000	1.85 m (6 ft 1 in)	Al-Naft	(Iraq)

Head coach

- (Serbia) Veselin Matić

Assistant coach(es)

- (Iraq) Aqeel Al-Jasim

Legend

- (C) Team captain
- (NP) Naturalized player
- Club – describes last
  club before the tournament
- Age – describes age
  on 5 August 2025

=== New Zealand ===
The roster was announced on 16 July 2025.

New Zealand men's national basketball team – 2025 FIBA Asia Cup roster
Players
Coaches

Pos.	No.	Name	Age – Date of birth	Height	Club	Ctr.
F	0	Carlin Davison	21 – 21 August 2003	1.98 m (6 ft 6 in)	Taranaki Mountainairs	(New Zealand)
G	3	Mojave King	23 – 11 June 2002	1.93 m (6 ft 4 in)	New Zealand Breakers	(Australia)
PG	4	Dontae Russo-Nance	20 – 20 January 2005	1.90 m (6 ft 3 in)	Perth Wildcats	(Australia)
PG	5	Taylor Britt	28 – 22 September 1996	1.88 m (6 ft 2 in)	Canterbury Rams	(New Zealand)
SG	6	Taine Murray	23 – 19 April 2002	1.94 m (6 ft 4 in)	Brisbane Bullets	(Australia)
F	10	Ben Gold	22 – 26 April 2003	2.08 m (6 ft 10 in)	Marquette Golden Eagles	(United States)
PG	11	Flynn Cameron	25 – 30 June 2000	1.90 m (6 ft 3 in)	Adelaide 36ers	(Australia)
F	12	Max Darling	24 – 30 September 2000	1.96 m (6 ft 5 in)	Canterbury Rams	(New Zealand)
C	15	Jordan Hunt	27 – 12 September 1997	2.06 m (6 ft 9 in)	Franklin Bulls	(New Zealand)
PF	16	Tohi Smith-Milner	29 – 6 October 1995	2.06 m (6 ft 9 in)	Canterbury Rams	(New Zealand)
SF	20	Jordan Ngatai (C)	32 – 7 March 1993	1.96 m (6 ft 5 in)	Wellington Saints	(New Zealand)
F	27	Jack Andrew	23 – 8 October 2001	2.06 m (6 ft 9 in)	Taranaki Mountainairs	(New Zealand)

Head coach

- (New Zealand) Judd Flavel

Assistant coach(es)

- (New Zealand) Michael Fitchett
- (New Zealand) Daniel Sokolovsky

Legend

- (C) Team captain
- Club – describes last
  club before the tournament
- Age – describes age
  on 5 August 2025

=== Philippines ===
The roster was announced on 31 July 2025.

Philippines men's national basketball team – 2025 FIBA Asia Cup roster
Players
Coaches

Pos.	No.	Name	Age – Date of birth	Height	Club	Ctr.
G	3	Chris Newsome	35 – 25 July 1990	1.88 m (6 ft 2 in)	Meralco Bolts	(Philippines)
F	8	Calvin Oftana	29 – 3 January 1996	1.96 m (6 ft 5 in)	TNT Tropang 5G	(Philippines)
SG	9	Scottie Thompson	32 – 12 July 1993	1.85 m (6 ft 1 in)	Barangay Ginebra San Miguel	(Philippines)
SG	13	Jamie Malonzo	29 – 31 July 1996	2.01 m (6 ft 7 in)	Barangay Ginebra San Miguel	(Philippines)
C	15	June Mar Fajardo	35 – 17 November 1989	2.11 m (6 ft 11 in)	San Miguel Beermen	(Philippines)
G	17	CJ Perez	31 – 17 November 1993	1.88 m (6 ft 2 in)	San Miguel Beermen	(Philippines)
PG	24	Dwight Ramos	26 – 2 September 1998	1.93 m (6 ft 4 in)	Levanga Hokkaido	(Japan)
PF	25	Japeth Aguilar (C)	38 – 25 January 1987	2.06 m (6 ft 9 in)	Barangay Ginebra San Miguel	(Philippines)
F	28	Kevin Quiambao	24 – 22 April 2001	1.93 m (6 ft 4 in)	Goyang Sono Skygunners	(South Korea)
PF	32	Justin Brownlee (NP)	37 – 23 April 1988	2.00 m (6 ft 7 in)	Barangay Ginebra San Miguel	(Philippines)
F	33	Carl Tamayo	24 – 13 February 2001	2.03 m (6 ft 8 in)	Changwon LG Sakers	(South Korea)
C	34	A. J. Edu	25 – 1 January 2000	2.08 m (6 ft 10 in)	Toyama Grouses	(Japan)

Head coach

- (United States) Tim Cone

Assistant coach(es)

- (Philippines) Richard del Rosario
- (Philippines) Jong Uichico

Legend

- (C) Team captain
- (NP) Naturalized player
- Club – describes last
  club before the tournament
- Age – describes age
  on 5 August 2025
