= 2016 FIBA World Olympic Qualifying Tournaments for Men squads =

This article displays the squads of the teams that competed in 2016 FIBA World Olympic Qualifying Tournaments for Men. Each team consists of 12 players.

Age and club as of the start of the tournament, 4 July 2016.

== OQT Belgrade (Serbia) ==
=== Serbia ===
Serbian men's basketball national team roster
Players
Coaches

Pos.	No.	Name	Age – Date of birth	Height	Club	Ctr.
SG	7	Bogdan Bogdanović	23 – August 18, 1992	1.98 m (6 ft 6 in)	Fenerbahce	(Turkey)
SF	8	Nemanja Dangubić	23 – April 13, 1993	2.04 m (6 ft 8 in)	Crvena zvezda	(Serbia)
PF	12	Stefan Birčević	26 – December 13, 1989	2.10 m (6 ft 11 in)	Partizan	(Serbia)
C	14	Nikola Jokić	21 – February 19, 1995	2.11 m (6 ft 11 in)	Denver Nuggets	(United States)
PG	6	Stefan Jović	25 – November 3, 1990	1.98 m (6 ft 6 in)	Crvena zvezda	(Serbia)
SF	10	Nikola Kalinić	24 – November 8, 1991	2.02 m (6 ft 8 in)	Fenerbahce	(Turkey)
PG	9	Stefan Marković	28 – April 25, 1988	1.97 m (6 ft 6 in)	Baloncesto Málaga	(Spain)
G	11	Nemanja Nedović	24 – June 16, 1991	1.92 m (6 ft 4 in)	Baloncesto Málaga	(Spain)
C	13	Miroslav Raduljica	28 – January 5, 1988	2.13 m (7 ft 0 in)	Panathinaikos	(Greece)
SF	5	Marko Simonović	30 – March 8, 1986	2.02 m (6 ft 8 in)	Crvena zvezda	(Serbia)
PG	4	Miloš Teodosić (C)	29 – March 19, 1987	1.95 m (6 ft 5 in)	CSKA Moscow	(Russia)
C	15	Vladimir Štimac	28 – September 25, 1987	2.11 m (6 ft 11 in)	Crvena Zvezda	(Serbia)

Head coach

- (Serbia) Aleksandar Đorđević

Assistant coach(es)

- (Serbia) Miroslav Nikolić
- (Serbia) Jovica Antonić
- (Serbia) Milan Minić

Legend

- Club – describes last
  club before the tournament
- Age – describes age
  on 4 July 2016

=== Angola ===
Preliminary squad.

Angola men's national basketball team roster roster
Players
Coaches

Pos.	No.	Name	Age – Date of birth	Height	Club
PF	2	Gerson Domingos	20 – 16 April 1996	1.91 m (6 ft 3 in)	G.D. Interclube	(Angola)
PF	3	Gerson Gonçalves	20 – 29 March 1996	1.93 m (6 ft 4 in)	Petro de Luanda	(Angola)
SG	6	Carlos Morais (C)	30 – 16 October 1985	1.93 m (6 ft 4 in)	Recreativo do Libolo	(Angola)
G	8	Hermenegildo Santos	25 – 16 August 1990	1.88 m (6 ft 2 in)	Primeiro de Agosto	(Angola)
PF	9	Leonel Paulo	30 – 30 April 1986	1.98 m (6 ft 6 in)	Petro Atlético	(Angola)
PG	10	Sílvio Sousa	17 – 17 July 1998	2.03 m (6 ft 8 in)	Montverde Academy	(United States)
PG	11	Bruno Fernando	17 – 15 August 1998	2.08 m (6 ft 10 in)	Montverde Academy	(United States)
F/C	12	Felizardo Ambrósio	28 – 25 October 1987	2.01 m (6 ft 7 in)	Primeiro de Agosto	(Angola)
SF	13	Islando Manuel	25 – 11 February 1991	1.95 m (6 ft 5 in)	Primeiro de Agosto	(Angola)
G	14	Edson Ndoniema	25 – 11 February 1991	1.93 m (6 ft 4 in)	Primeiro de Agosto	(Angola)
C	15	Valdelício Joaquim	26 – 15 April 1990	2.09 m (6 ft 10 in)	Recreativo do Libolo	(Angola)
F	23	Reggie Moore	35 – 31 March 1981	2.00 m (6 ft 7 in)	Petro de Luanda	(Angola)

Head coach

- Carlos Dinis

Assistant coach(es)

- Jacinto Olim
- Miguel Ramos

Legend

- Club – describes last
  club before the tournament
- Age – describes age
  on 4 July 2016

=== Puerto Rico ===
Puerto Rico men's national basketball team roster
Players
Coaches

Pos.	No.	Name	Age – Date of birth	Height	Club
PG	2	Guillermo Diaz	31 – March 4, 1985	6 ft 2 in (1.88 m)	Capitanes de Arecibo	(Puerto Rico)
PF	13	Renaldo Balkman	31 – July 14, 1984	6 ft 8 in (2.03 m)	Capitanes de Arecibo	(Puerto Rico)
PG	5	José Juan Barea (C)	32 – June 26, 1984	6 ft 0 in (1.83 m)	Dallas Mavericks	(United States)
PF	1	Ramón Clemente	30 – December 11, 1985	6 ft 7 in (2.01 m)	Ferro Carril Oeste	(Argentina)
SG	23	John Holland	27 – November 6, 1988	6 ft 5 in (1.96 m)	Boston Celtics	(United States)
PG	7	Carlos Arroyo	36 – July 30, 1979	6 ft 2 in (1.88 m)	FC Barcelona	(Spain)
C	10	Jorge Brian Díaz	26 – November 13, 1989	6 ft 11 in (2.11 m)	Piratas de Quebradillas	(Puerto Rico)
PF	11	Ricky Sánchez	28 – July 6, 1987	6 ft 11 in (2.11 m)	Indios de Mayagüez (basketball)	(Puerto Rico)
SF	8	Ángel Daniel Vassallo	30 – April 2, 1986	6 ft 6 in (1.98 m)	Leones de Ponce	(Puerto Rico)
SG	33	David Huertas	29 – June 2, 1987	6 ft 5 in (1.96 m)	Capitanes de Arecibo	(Puerto Rico)
SF	15	Alex Galindo	31 – April 6, 1985	6 ft 7 in (2.01 m)	Indios de Mayagüez	(Puerto Rico)
C	36	Peter John Ramos	31 – April 23, 1985	7 ft 3 in (2.21 m)	Jilin Northeast Tigers	(China)

Head coach

- (Puerto Rico) Eddie Casiano

Assistant coach(es)

- (Puerto Rico) Manolo Cintrón
- (Puerto Rico) Omar González
- (Puerto Rico) Rafael Torres

Legend

- (C) Team captain
- Club field describes current pro club
- Age – describes age
  on July 4, 2016

=== Japan ===
Japan men's national basketball team roster roster
Players
Coaches
}

Pos.	No.	Name	Age – Date of birth	Height	Club
PG	0	Yuta Tabuse	35 – 5 October 1980	1.73 m (5 ft 8 in)	Link Tochigi Brex	(Japan)
PG	3	Naoto Tsuji	26 – 8 September 1989	1.85 m (6 ft 1 in)	Toshiba BT	(Japan)
SG	6	Makoto Hiejima	24 – 11 August 1990	1.90 m (6 ft 3 in)	Aisin SeaHorses Mikawa	(Japan)
C	8	Atsuya Ohta	32 – 6 April 1984	2.06 m (6 ft 9 in)	Higashimikawa Phoenix	(Japan)
C	10	Kosouke Takeuchi	31 – 29 January 1985	2.06 m (6 ft 9 in)	Hiroshima Dragonflies	(Japan)
PG	11	Ryomo Hashimoto	28 – 11 May 1988	1.78 m (5 ft 10 in)	Aisin SeaHorses Mikawa	(Japan)
F	12	Yuta Watanabe	21 – 13 October 1994	2.01 m (6 ft 7 in)	George Washington Colonials	(United States)
C	15	Joji Takeuchi	31 – 29 January 1985	2.07 m (6 ft 9 in)	Hitachi SR	(Japan)
G	16	Keijuro Matsui	30 – 16 October 1985	1.88 m (6 ft 2 in)	Toyota Alvark	(Japan)
SG	25	Takatoshi Furukawa	28 – 20 October 1987	1.90 m (6 ft 3 in)	Link Tochigi Brex	(Japan)
SF	34	Ryumo Ono	28 – 6 January 1988	1.98 m (6 ft 6 in)	Chiba Jets	(Japan)
G	42	Kenta Hirose	26 – 29 August 1989	1.93 m (6 ft 4 in)	Hitachi SR	(Japan)

Head coach

- (Japan) Kenji Hasegawa

Assistant coach(es)

- (Japan) Norio Sassa

Legend

- Club – describes last
  club before the tournament
- Age – describes age
  on July 4, 2016

=== Czech Republic ===
Czech Republic men's national basketball team roster
Players
Coaches
}

Pos.	No.	Name	Age – Date of birth	Height	Club	Ctr.
PF	4	Petr Benda	34 – 25 March 1982	2.04 m (6 ft 8 in)	ČEZ Nymburk	(Czech Republic)
PF	5	Patrik Auda	26 – 29 August 1989	2.06 m (6 ft 9 in)	Basquet Manresa	(Spain)
SF	6	Pavel Pumprla	29 – 13 June 1986	1.97 m (6 ft 6 in)	CB Estudiantes	(Spain)
SF	7	Vojtěch Hruban	26 – 29 August 1989	2.00 m (6 ft 7 in)	ČEZ Nymburk	(Czech Republic)
PG	8	Tomáš Satoranský	24 – 30 October 1991	2.00 m (6 ft 7 in)	FC Barcelona	(Spain)
SG	9	Jiří Welsch	36 – 27 January 1980	2.00 m (6 ft 7 in)	ČEZ Nymburk	(Czech Republic)
PF	10	Pavel Houška	32 – 23 January 1984	2.03 m (6 ft 8 in)	ČEZ Nymburk	(Czech Republic)
SF	11	Lukáš Palyza	26 – 10 October 1989	1.95 m (6 ft 5 in)	Prostějov	(Czech Republic)
PG	13	Jakub Šiřina	28 – 21 November 1987	1.87 m (6 ft 2 in)	BK Opava	(Czech Republic)
SF	21	Blake Schilb	32 – 23 December 1983	1.98 m (6 ft 6 in)	Galatasaray	(Turkey)
C	24	Jan Veselý	26 – 24 April 1990	2.13 m (7 ft 0 in)	Fenerbahçe	(Turkey)
SF	31	Martin Kriz	22 – 17 July 1993	1.98 m (6 ft 6 in)	ČEZ Nymburk	(Czech Republic)

Head coach

- (Israel) Ronen Ginzburg

Assistant coach(es)

- (Czech Republic) Pavel Beneš
- (Czech Republic) Lubomir Ružička

Legend

- Club – describes last
  club before the tournament
- Age – describes age
  on July 4, 2016

=== Latvia ===
Latvia men's national basketball team roster
Players
Coaches

Pos.	No.	Name	Age – Date of birth	Height	Club	Ctr.
F	5	Mareks Mejeris	24 – 2 September 1991	2.07 m (6 ft 9 in)	Chalon	(France)
G	7	Jānis Blūms	34 – 20 April 1982	1.91 m (6 ft 3 in)	Sidigas Avellino	(Italy)
SF	8	Jānis Bērziņš	23 – 4 May 1993	2.01 m (6 ft 7 in)	VEF Rīga	(Latvia)
G	9	Dairis Bertāns	26 – 9 September 1989	1.93 m (6 ft 4 in)	Bilbao Basket	(Spain)
SF	10	Jānis Timma	24 – 2 July 1992	2.01 m (6 ft 7 in)	Zenit	(Russia)
G	13	Jānis Strēlnieks	26 – 1 September 1989	1.91 m (6 ft 3 in)	Brose Baskets	(Germany)
PF	14	Kaspars Bērziņš	30 – 25 August 1985	2.11 m (6 ft 11 in)	Zenit	(Russia)
SF	15	Ojārs Siliņš	22 – 20 July 1993	2.04 m (6 ft 8 in)	Pallacanestro Reggiana	(Italy)
SG	21	Aigars Šķēle	23 – 4 December 1992	1.92 m (6 ft 4 in)	Valmiera	(Latvia)
F/C	32	Anžejs Pasečņiks	20 – 20 December 1995	2.16 m (7 ft 1 in)	Gran Canaria	(Spain)
F/C	33	Mārtiņš Meiers	25 – 30 March 1991	2.08 m (6 ft 10 in)	VEF Rīga	(Latvia)
PG	41	Ingus Jakovičs	23 – 18 April 1993	1.85 m (6 ft 1 in)	VEF Rīga	(Latvia)

Head coach

- (Latvia) Ainars Bagatskis

Assistant coach(es)

- (Latvia) Ainārs Zvirgzdiņš
- (Latvia) Artūrs Štālbergs
- (Latvia) Roberts Štelmahers

Legend

- Club – describes last
  club before the tournament
- Age – describes age
  on 4 July 2016

== OQT Manila (Philippines) ==
=== Turkey ===
Turkey national basketball team – 2016 FIBA World Olympic Qualifying Tournament roster roster
Players
Coaches

Pos.	No.	Name	Age – Date of birth	Height	Club
PG	1	Ender Arslan	33 – 13 January 1983	1.85 m (6 ft 1 in)	Darüşşafaka Doğuş	(Turkey)
C	3	Ömer Aşık	30 – 4 July 1986	2.13 m (7 ft 0 in)	New Orleans Pelicans	(United States)
SG	5	Sinan Güler	32 – 8 November 1983	1.92 m (6 ft 4 in)	Galatasaray	(Turkey)
G/F	6	Cedi Osman	21 – 8 April 1995	2.00 m (6 ft 7 in)	Anadolu Efes	(Turkey)
C	9	Semih Erden	29 – 28 July 1986	2.10 m (6 ft 11 in)	Darüşşafaka Doğuş	(Turkey)
G	10	Melih Mahmutoğlu	26 – 12 May 1990	1.91 m (6 ft 3 in)	Fenerbahçe	(Turkey)
C	11	Oğuz Savaş	28 – 13 July 1987	2.11 m (6 ft 11 in)	Darüşşafaka Doğuş	(Turkey)
PF	12	Samet Geyik	23 – 12 January 1993	2.06 m (6 ft 9 in)	Pınar Karşıyaka	(Turkey)
PG	13	Ali Muhammed	33 – 10 April 1983	1.78 m (5 ft 10 in)	Fenerbahçe	(Turkey)
G/F	15	Birkan Batuk	26 – 30 January 1990	1.96 m (6 ft 5 in)	Anadulo Efes	(Turkey)
G/F	21	Furkan Korkmaz	18 – 24 July 1997	2.00 m (6 ft 7 in)	Philadelphia 76ers	(United States)
G	25	Kenan Sipahi	21 – 26 May 1995	1.97 m (6 ft 6 in)	Fenerbahçe	(Turkey)

Head coach

- (Turkey) Ergin Ataman

Assistant coach(es)

- (Turkey) Ufuk Sarıca
- (Turkey) Yakup Sekizkök
- (Turkey) Serhat Şehit

Legend

- Club – describes last
  club before the tournament
- Age – describes age
  on 4 July 2016

=== Senegal ===
Senegal men's national basketball team roster
Players
Coaches

Pos.	No.	Name	Age – Date of birth	Height	Club
SG	3	El Hadji Malick	29 – 18 November 1986	1.96 m (6 ft 5 in)	Stade Gabèsien	(Tunisia)
G	4	Thierno Niang	26 – 8 March 1990	1.85 m (6 ft 1 in)	Geish Army	(Egypt)
PG	5	Louis Adams	26 – 22 January 1990	1.85 m (6 ft 1 in)	AS Douanes	(Senegal)
F	6	Ibrahima Thomas	29 – 7 February 1987	2.11 m (6 ft 11 in)	Cáceres	(Spain)
F	8	Antoine Mendy	32 – 16 August 1983	1.98 m (6 ft 6 in)	Orléans Loiret Basket	(France)
F	9	Maleye N'Doye	35 – 19 August 1980	1.99 m (6 ft 6 in)	Paris-Levallois Basket	(France)
C	10	Cheikh Mbodj	28 – 1 August 1987	2.08 m (6 ft 10 in)	Czarni Słupsk	(Poland)
PG	11	Clevin Hannah	28 – 15 November 1987	1.80 m (5 ft 11 in)	Dominion Bilbao	(Spain)
G	12	Serigne Gueye	24 – 12 January 1992	1.90 m (6 ft 3 in)	UGB St.Louis	(Senegal)
C	13	Hamady N'Diaye	29 – 12 January 1987	2.13 m (7 ft 0 in)	Bnei Herzliya	(Israel)
C	15	Abdoulaye N'Doye	20 – 23 August 1995	2.10 m (6 ft 11 in)	Élan Chalon	(France)

Head coach

- (Senegal) Cheikh Sarr

Assistant coach(es)

- (Senegal) Parfait Adjivon
- (Senegal) Raoul Toupane

Legend

- Club – describes last
  club before the tournament
- Age – describes age
  on 5 July 2016

=== Canada ===
Canada National Basketball Team roster
Players
Coaches

Pos.	No.	Name	Age – Date of birth	Height	Club
G	4	Philip Scrubb	23 – November 27, 1992	6 ft 3 in (1.91 m)	Skyliners Frankfurt	(Germany)
PG	5	Shai Gilgeous-Alexander	17 – July 12, 1998	6 ft 2 in (1.88 m)	Hamilton Heights Christian Academy	(Canada)
PG	6	Cory Joseph (C)	24 – September 20, 1991	6 ft 3 in (1.91 m)	Toronto Raptors	(Canada)
SF	7	Melvin Ejim	25 – March 4, 1991	6 ft 6 in (1.98 m)	Reyer Venezia Mestre	(Italy)
SF	8	Thomas Scrubb	24 – September 26, 1991	6 ft 6 in (1.98 m)	Kataja Basket Club	(Finland)
PF	9	Khem Birch	23 – September 28, 1992	6 ft 9 in (2.06 m)	Olympiacos B.C.	(Greece)
F	10	Anthony Bennett	23 – March 14, 1993	6 ft 8 in (2.03 m)	Toronto Raptors	(Canada)
PG	11	Tyler Ennis	21 – August 24, 1994	6 ft 2 in (1.88 m)	Milwaukee Bucks	(United States)
SG	12	Brady Heslip	26 – June 19, 1990	6 ft 1 in (1.85 m)	Pallacanestro Cantù	(Italy)
F/C	13	Tristan Thompson	25 – March 13, 1991	6 ft 9 in (2.06 m)	Cleveland Cavaliers	(United States)
F/C	14	Levon Kendall	32 – July 4, 1984	6 ft 10 in (2.08 m)	CB Estudiantes	(Spain)
C	15	Joel Anthony	33 – August 9, 1982	6 ft 9 in (2.06 m)	Detroit Pistons	(United States)

Head coach

- (Canada) Jay Triano

Assistant coach(es)

- (Canada) Dave Smart
- (Canada) Scott Morrison
- (Canada) Nathaniel Mitchell

Legend

- (C) Team captain
- Club – describes last
  professional club
- Age – describes age
  on 5 July 2016

=== France ===
France men's national basketball team roster
Players
Coaches

Pos.	No.	Name	Age – Date of birth	Height	Club	Ctr.
G	4	Thomas Heurtel	27 – 10 April 1989	1.88 m (6 ft 2 in)	Anadolu Efes S.K.	(Turkey)
SF	5	Nicolas Batum	27 – 14 December 1988	2.03 m (6 ft 8 in)	Charlotte Hornets	(United States)
G	6	Antoine Diot	27 – 17 January 1989	1.93 m (6 ft 4 in)	Valencia BC	(Spain)
F/C	7	Joffrey Lauvergne	24 – 30 September 1991	2.09 m (6 ft 10 in)	Denver Nuggets	(United States)
SF	8	Charles Lombahe-Kahudi	29 – 19 July 1986	1.97 m (6 ft 6 in)	ASVEL Basket	(France)
PG	9	Tony Parker	34 – 17 May 1982	1.86 m (6 ft 1 in)	San Antonio Spurs	(United States)
PF	11	Florent Piétrus	35 – 19 January 1981	2.01 m (6 ft 7 in)	SLUC Nancy	(France)
G	12	Nando de Colo	29 – 23 June 1987	1.96 m (6 ft 5 in)	CSKA Moscow	(Russia)
PF	13	Boris Diaw	34 – 16 April 1982	2.03 m (6 ft 8 in)	San Antonio Spurs	(United States)
SF	15	Mickaël Gelabale	33 – 22 May 1983	2.01 m (6 ft 7 in)	Le Mans Sarthe	(France)
C	17	Kim Tillie	27 – 15 July 1988	2.11 m (6 ft 11 in)	Laboral Kutxa Baskonia	(Spain)
F	18	Adrien Moerman	27 – 7 August 1988	2.06 m (6 ft 9 in)	Banvit B.K.	(Turkey)

Head coach

- (France) Vincent Collet

Assistant coach(es)

- (France) Jacques Commères
- (France) Ruddy Nelhomme

Legend

- Club – describes last
  club before the tournament
- Age – describes age
  on 5 July 2016

=== New Zealand ===
New Zealand Tall Blacks – 2016 FIBA World Olympic Qualifying Tournament roster
Players
Coaches

Pos.	No.	Name	Age – Date of birth	Height	Club
G	0	Tai Webster	21 – 29 May 1995	1.93 m (6 ft 4 in)	Nebraska Cornhuskers	(United States)
PG	3	Shea Ili	23 – 6 October 1992	1.83 m (6 ft 0 in)	New Zealand Breakers	(New Zealand)
SG	5	Everard Bartlett	30 – 6 February 1986	1.93 m (6 ft 4 in)	Southland Sharks	(New Zealand)
F	7	Mika Vukona	34 – 13 May 1982	1.98 m (6 ft 6 in)	Super City Rangers	(New Zealand)
G	8	Derone Raukawa	20 – 24 July 1995	1.95 m (6 ft 5 in)	Southland Sharks	(New Zealand)
G	9	Corey Webster	27 – 29 November 1988	1.88 m (6 ft 2 in)	New Zealand Breakers	(New Zealand)
SF	10	Thomas Abercrombie	29 – 5 July 1987	1.98 m (6 ft 6 in)	Pınar Karşıyaka	(Turkey)
PF	11	B.J. Anthony	27 – 20 July 1988	1.98 m (6 ft 6 in)	Wellington Saints	(New Zealand)
F/C	12	Isaac Fotu	22 – 18 December 1993	2.03 m (6 ft 8 in)	CAI Zaragoza	(Spain)
C	14	Robert Loe	24 – 5 August 1991	2.10 m (6 ft 11 in)	New Zealand Breakers	(New Zealand)
F	20	Jordan Ngatai	23 – 4 July 1993	1.95 m (6 ft 5 in)	Taranaki Mountainairs	(New Zealand)
C	44	Michael Karena	22 – 24 October 1993	2.09 m (6 ft 10 in)	Wright State Raiders	(United States)

Head coach

- (New Zealand) Paul Henare

Assistant coach(es)

- (New Zealand) Pero Cameron
- (New Zealand) Ross McMains
- (New Zealand) Mike Fitchett

Legend

- (C) Team captain
- Club – describes last
  club before the tournament
- Age – describes age
  on 5 July 2016

=== Philippines ===
Philippines men's national basketball team – 2016 FIBA World Olympic Qualifying Tournament roster
Players
Coaches

Pos.	No.	Name	Age – Date of birth	Height	Club	Ctr.
F/C	1	Andray Blatche (NP)	29 – 22 August 1986	2.11 m (6 ft 11 in)	Xinjiang Flying Tigers	(China)
G	2	Terrence Romeo	24 – 16 March 1992	1.80 m (5 ft 11 in)	GlobalPort Batang Pier	(Philippines)
G/F	3	Bobby Ray Parks Jr.	23 – 19 February 1993	1.93 m (6 ft 4 in)	Texas Legends	(United States)
G	6	Jeff Chan	32 – 11 February 1984	1.88 m (6 ft 2 in)	Rain or Shine Elasto Painters	(Philippines)
G	7	Jayson William (C)	30 – 30 June 1986	1.80 m (5 ft 11 in)	Tropang TNT	(Philippines)
G/F	10	Gabe Norwood	31 – 9 February 1985	1.98 m (6 ft 6 in)	Rain or Shine Elasto Painters	(Philippines)
G	11	Ryan Reyes	32 – 10 August 1983	1.88 m (6 ft 2 in)	Tropang TNT	(Philippines)
C	12	June Mar Fajardo	26 – 17 November 1989	2.11 m (6 ft 11 in)	San Miguel Beermen	(Philippines)
F	15	Marc Pingris	34 – 16 October 1981	1.93 m (6 ft 4 in)	Star Hotshots	(Philippines)
F	18	Troy Rosario	24 – 20 January 1992	2.01 m (6 ft 7 in)	Tropang TNT	(Philippines)
F/C	25	Japeth Aguilar	29 – 25 January 1987	2.07 m (6 ft 9 in)	Barangay Ginebra San Miguel	(Philippines)
F	33	Ranidel de Ocampo	34 – 8 December 1981	1.96 m (6 ft 5 in)	Tropang TNT	(Philippines)

Head coach

- (United States) Tab Baldwin

Assistant coach(es)

- (Philippines) Norman Black
- (Philippines) Alex Compton
- (Philippines) Jong Uichico
- (Philippines) Nash Racela
- (Philippines) Josh Reyes

Team manager

- (Philippines) Butch Antonio

Legend

- (C) Team captain
- (NP) Naturalized Player
- Club – describes last
  club before the tournament
- Age – describes age
  on July 4, 2016

== OQT Turin (Italy) ==
=== Greece ===
Greece men's national basketball team roster
Players
Coaches

Pos.	No.	Name	Age – Date of birth	Height	Club	Ctr.
PG	4	Giannis Athinaiou	28 – 17 May 1988	1.94 m (6 ft 4 in)	Olympiacos	(Greece)
PG	8	Nick Calathes	27 – 22 February 1989	1.98 m (6 ft 6 in)	Panathinaikos	(Greece)
C	9	Ioannis Bourousis (C)	32 – 17 November 1983	2.13 m (7 ft 0 in)	Laboral Kutxa Baskonia	(Spain)
PG	17	Vangelis Mantzaris	26 – 16 April 1990	1.96 m (6 ft 5 in)	Olympiacos	(Greece)
F/C	18	Dimitrios Agravanis	21 – 20 December 1994	2.08 m (6 ft 10 in)	Olympiacos	(Greece)
F	19	Giannis Papapetrou	22 – 30 March 1994	2.06 m (6 ft 9 in)	Olympiacos	(Greece)
F	25	Vassilis Charalampopoulos	19 – 6 January 1997	2.05 m (6 ft 9 in)	Panathinaikos	(Greece)
C	31	Georgios Bogris	27 – 19 February 1989	2.11 m (6 ft 11 in)	Bilbao Basket	(Spain)
G/F	33	Stratos Perperoglou	31 – 7 August 1984	2.03 m (6 ft 8 in)	FC Barcelona	(Spain)
F	34	Giannis Antetokounmpo	21 – 6 December 1994	2.11 m (6 ft 11 in)	Milwaukee Bucks	(United States)
C	41	Kosta Koufos	27 – 24 February 1989	2.13 m (7 ft 0 in)	Sacramento Kings	(United States)
SF	43	Thanasis Antetokounmpo	23 – 17 July 1992	2.01 m (6 ft 7 in)	Westchester Knicks	(United States)

Head coach

- (Greece) Fotios Katsikaris

Assistant coach(es)

- (Greece) Thanasis Skourtopoulos
- (Greece) Dimitrios Priftis

Legend

- Club – describes last
  club before the tournament
- Age – describes age
  in June 2016

=== Mexico ===
Mexico men's national basketball team roster
Players
Coaches

Pos.	No.	Name	Age – Date of birth	Height	Club
PG	4	Paul Stoll	30 – 14 December 1985	1.80 m (5 ft 11 in)	Avtodor Saratov	(Russia)
F	5	Marco Ramos	29 – 26 February 1987	1.98 m (6 ft 6 in)	Halcones Rojos Veracruz	(Mexico)
SF	6	Juan Toscano	23 – 10 April 1993	1.98 m (6 ft 6 in)	Marquette Golden Eagles	(United States)
PG	7	Jorge Gutiérrez	27 – 27 December 1988	1.91 m (6 ft 3 in)	Charlotte Hornets	(United States)
C	8	Israel Gutiérrez	23 – 15 January 1993	2.06 m (6 ft 9 in)	Boca Juniors (basketball)	(Argentina)
G/F	9	Francisco Cruz	26 – 3 October 1989	1.91 m (6 ft 3 in)	BK VEF Rīga	(Latvia)
SG	10	Gabriel Girón	28 – 27 February 1988	1.90 m (6 ft 3 in)	Fuerza Regia	(Mexico)
F/C	11	Edgar Garibay	26 – 5 March 1990	2.11 m (6 ft 11 in)	Gigantes del Estado de México	(Mexico)
PF	12	Héctor Hernández	31 – 15 June 1985	2.05 m (6 ft 9 in)	Pioneros de Quintana Roo	(Mexico)
SG	13	Orlando Méndez-Valdez	30 – 29 April 1986	1.83 m (6 ft 0 in)	Halcones de Xalapa	(Mexico)
C	14	Lorenzo Mata	29 – 8 July 1986	2.06 m (6 ft 9 in)	Halcones de Xalapa	(Mexico)
F/C	15	Rodrigo Adrián Zamora	29 – 28 October 1986	2.06 m (6 ft 9 in)	Halcones Rojos Veracruz	(Mexico)

Head coach

- (Spain) Sergio Valdeolmillos

Assistant coach(es)

- (Spain) Ramón Diaz

Legend

- Club – describes current
  or most recent club
- Age – describes age
  on July 4, 2016

=== Iran ===
Iran men's national basketball team roster
Players
Coaches

Pos.	No.	Name	Age – Date of birth	Height	Club	Ctr.
G	4	Adnan Doraghi	27 – 19 June 1989	1.90 m (6 ft 3 in)	Gorgan	(Iran)
PG	5	Sajjad Mashayekhi	22 – 23 February 1994	1.80 m (5 ft 11 in)	Mahram	(Iran)
PG	6	Farid Aslani	28 – July 4, 1988	1.83 m (6 ft 0 in)	Chemidor Tehran	(Iran)
PF	7	Mohammad Hassanzadeh	25 – 6 October 1990	2.05 m (6 ft 9 in)	Foolad Mahan Isfahan BC	(Iran)
SG	8	Behnam Yakhchali	20 – 12 July 1995	1.95 m (6 ft 5 in)	Petrochimi	(Iran)
F	9	Arman Zangeneh	23 – 15 June 1993	2.02 m (6 ft 8 in)	Petrochimi	(Iran)
F	10	Amir Sedighi	23 – 16 April 1993	1.86 m (6 ft 1 in)	Mahram	(Iran)
PF	11	Oshin Sahakian	30 – 21 March 1986	2.00 m (6 ft 7 in)	Mahram	(Iran)
C	12	Asghar Kardoust	30 – 21 March 1986	2.13 m (7 ft 0 in)	Mahram	(Iran)
SF	13	Mohammad Jamshidi	24 – July 30, 1991	1.99 m (6 ft 6 in)	Meralco Bolts	(Philippines)
G	14	Arsalan Kazemi	26 – April 22, 1990	2.03 m (6 ft 8 in)	Samen Mashhad	(Iran)
C	15	Hamed Haddadi	31 – 19 May 1985	2.18 m (7 ft 2 in)	Petrochimi	(Iran)

Head coach

- (Germany) Dirk Bauermann

Assistant coach(es)

- (Iran) Mehran Shahintab

Legend

- Club – describes last
  club before the tournament
- Age – describes age
  on 4 July 2016

=== Tunisia ===
Tunisia men's basketball national team roster
Players
Coaches

Pos.	No.	Name	Age – Date of birth	Height	Club	Ctr.
G	1	Omar Mouhli	30 – 19 March 1986	1.91 m (6 ft 3 in)	Etoile Sportive Du Sahel	(Tunisia)
F	2	Ziyed Chennoufi	27 – 29 November 1988	2.02 m (6 ft 8 in)	Club Africain	(Tunisia)
G	3	Mehdi Seyeh	25 – 4 September 1990	1.82 m (6 ft 0 in)	Etoile Sportive Du Sahel	(Tunisia)
PG	4	Omar Abada	23 – 20 April 1993	1.89 m (6 ft 2 in)	Etoile Sportive Radès	(Tunisia)
G	7	Mourad El Mabrouk	29 – 19 October 1986	1.89 m (6 ft 2 in)	Club Africain	(Tunisia)
C	11	Mokhtar Ghyaza	29 – 15 November 1986	2.04 m (6 ft 8 in)	Club Africain	(Tunisia)
SG	20	Michael Roll	29 – 12 April 1987	1.98 m (6 ft 6 in)	Saski Baskonia	(Spain)
F	23	Firas Lahyani	24 – 16 July 1991	2.01 m (6 ft 7 in)	US Monastir	(Tunisia)
C	30	Mohamed Abbassi	29 – 22 July 1986	2.02 m (6 ft 8 in)	Etoile Sportive Radès	(Tunisia)
G	66	Nizar Knioua	33 – 8 June 1983	1.89 m (6 ft 2 in)	Club Africain	(Tunisia)
F/C	86	Hamdi Braa	29 – 7 September 1986	2.03 m (6 ft 8 in)	Etoile Sportive Du Sahel	(Tunisia)
C	89	Makrem Ben Romdhane	27 – 27 March 1989	2.06 m (6 ft 9 in)	Etoile Sportive Du Sahel	(Tunisia)

Head coach

- (Tunisia) Adel Tlatli

=== Croatia ===
Croatia men's national basketball team roster
Players
Coaches

Pos.	No.	Name	Age – Date of birth	Height	Club	Ctr.
SF	4	Luka Babić	24 – 29 September 1991	2.01 m (6 ft 7 in)	Cedevita	(Croatia)
SG	5	Filip Krušlin	27 – 18 March 1989	1.96 m (6 ft 5 in)	Cibona	(Croatia)
PG	6	Rok Stipčević	30 – 20 May 1986	1.85 m (6 ft 1 in)	Dinamo Sassari	(Italy)
SG	7	Krunoslav Simon	31 – 24 June 1985	1.97 m (6 ft 6 in)	Armani Milano	(Italy)
SF	8	Mario Hezonja	21 – 25 February 1995	2.01 m (6 ft 7 in)	Orlando Magic	(United States)
PF	9	Dario Šarić	22 – 8 April 1994	2.08 m (6 ft 10 in)	Anadolu Efes	(Turkey)
PG	10	Roko Ukić (C)	31 – 5 December 1984	1.96 m (6 ft 5 in)	Pallacanestro Cantù	(Italy)
C	12	Darko Planinić	25 – 22 November 1990	2.11 m (6 ft 11 in)	Laboral Kutxa	(Spain)
C	14	Miro Bilan	26 – 21 July 1989	2.15 m (7 ft 1 in)	Cedevita	(Croatia)
PF	33	Željko Šakić	28 – 14 April 1988	2.03 m (6 ft 8 in)	Cibona	(Croatia)
PF	35	Marko Arapović	19 – 20 July 1996	2.07 m (6 ft 9 in)	Cedevita	(Croatia)
SG	44	Bojan Bogdanović	27 – 18 April 1989	2.00 m (6 ft 7 in)	Brooklyn Nets	(United States)

Head coach

- (Croatia) Aleksandar Petrović

Assistant coach(es)

- (Croatia) Dražen Anzulović
- (Croatia) Ivica Skelin
- (Croatia) Dražen Orešković

Legend

- (C) Team captain
- Club – describes last
  club before the tournament
- Age – describes age
  on 3 July 2016

=== Italy ===
Italy men's basketball national team roster
Players
Coaches

Pos.	No.	Name	Age – Date of birth	Height	Club	Ctr.
PG	2	Giuseppe Poeta	30 – 12 September 1985	1.91 m (6 ft 3 in)	Auxilium Torino	(Italy)
SG	3	Marco Belinelli	30 – 25 March 1986	1.96 m (6 ft 5 in)	Charlotte Hornets	(United States)
SG	4	Pietro Aradori	27 – 9 December 1988	1.98 m (6 ft 6 in)	Reggio Emilia	(Italy)
SG	5	Alessandro Gentile	23 – 12 November 1992	1.95 m (6 ft 5 in)	EA7 Milano	(Italy)
F/C	7	Andrea Bargnani	30 – 26 October 1985	2.12 m (6 ft 11 in)	Free agent
SF	8	Danilo Gallinari	27 – 8 August 1988	2.08 m (6 ft 10 in)	Denver Nuggets	(United States)
PF	9	Nicolò Melli	25 – 26 January 1991	2.05 m (6 ft 9 in)	Brose Baskets	(Germany)
C	12	Marco Cusin	31 – 28 February 1985	2.11 m (6 ft 11 in)	Vanoli Cremona	(Italy)
PF	13	Luigi Datome (C)	28 – 27 November 1987	2.02 m (6 ft 8 in)	Fenerbahçe	(Turkey)
C	14	Riccardo Cervi	25 – 19 June 1991	2.14 m (7 ft 0 in)	Sidigas Avellino	(Italy)
PG	23	Daniel Hackett	28 – 19 December 1987	1.99 m (6 ft 6 in)	Olympiacos	(Greece)
G	27	Stefano Tonut	22 – 7 November 1993	1.92 m (6 ft 4 in)	Reyer Venezia	(Italy)

Head coach

- (Italy) Ettore Messina

Assistant coach(es)

- (Italy) Luca Dalmonte
- (Italy) Mario Fioretti
- (Spain) Gov. Eduardo Buenavista

Legend

- (C) – Team Captain
- Club – describes last
  club before the tournament
- Age – describes age
  on 4 July 2016
