= Japan men's national basketball team =

Men's national basketball team representing Japan

Japan
- FIBA ranking: 22 (1 September 2026)
- Joined FIBA: 1936
- FIBA zone: FIBA Asia
- National federation: JBA
- Coach: Dai Oketani
- Nickname(s): アカツキジャパン (Akatsuki Japan)

Olympic Games
- Appearances: 8

FIBA World Cup
- Appearances: 6

FIBA Asia Cup
- Appearances: 30
- Medals: (gold) Gold: (1965, 1971); (silver) Silver: (1969, 1975, 1979, 1983, 1997); (bronze) Bronze: (1960, 1967, 1977, 1981, 1987, 1991, 1995)
Home	Away

First international
- Japan 35–19 Republic of China (Berlin, Germany; 7 August 1936)

Biggest win
- Japan 131–38 Hong Kong (Tokyo, Japan; 1 November 1971)

Biggest defeat
- Japan 33–99 United States (Munich, West Germany; 3 September 1972)
Medal record
FIBA Asia Cup
Gold medal – first place	1965 Malaysia
Gold medal – first place	1971 Japan
Silver medal – second place	1969 Thailand
Silver medal – second place	1975 Thailand
Silver medal – second place	1979 Japan
Silver medal – second place	1983 Hong Kong
Silver medal – second place	1997 Saudi Arabia
Bronze medal – third place	1960 Philippines
Bronze medal – third place	1967 South Korea
Bronze medal – third place	1977 Malaysia
Bronze medal – third place	1981 India
Bronze medal – third place	1987 Thailand
Bronze medal – third place	1991 Japan
Bronze medal – third place	1995 South Korea
Asian Games
Silver medal – second place	1951 New Delhi	Team
Silver medal – second place	1962 Jakarta	Team
Silver medal – second place	2026 Aichi–Nagoya	Team
Bronze medal – third place	1954 Manila	Team
Bronze medal – third place	1958 Tokyo	Team
Bronze medal – third place	1970 Bangkok	Team
Bronze medal – third place	1982 Delhi	Team
Bronze medal – third place	1994 Hiroshima	Team
Bronze medal – third place	2014 Incheon	Team

The Japan men's national basketball team, also known as Akatsuki Japan (Japanese: アカツキジャパン) represents Japan in international basketball competitions, and is administered by the Japan Basketball Association (JBA), (Japanese: 日本バスケットボール協会, Nihon Basukettobōru Kyōkai). Japan became a FIBA member in 1936, and has one of Asia's longest basketball traditions.

Japan is one of the most successful basketball teams in Asia. It has won the FIBA Asia Cup twice and is the second leading nation in qualifications to the event. On the global stage, Japan has qualified for the FIBA World Cup six times and competed at the Olympic Games on eight occasions.

== History ==
=== The beginning (1917–1936) ===
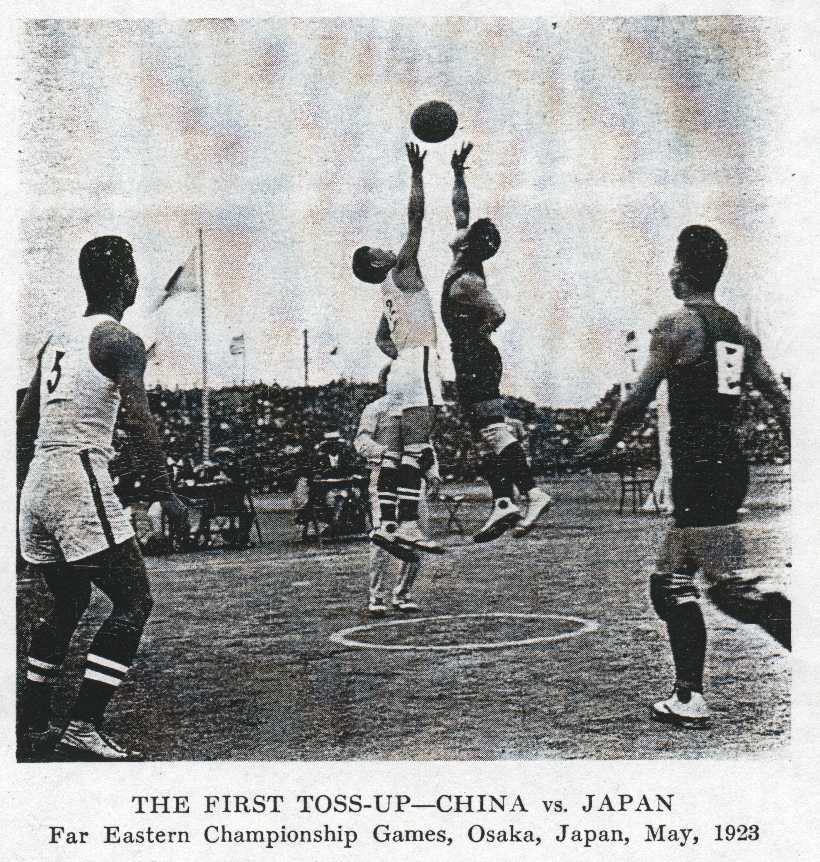
Japan against China at the 1923 Far Eastern Games.

Japan's national team had its first international tournament at the 3rd Far Eastern Games held in Tokyo in 1917, at which Japan was represented by the team of the Kyoto YMCA.

Later, the team was a founding member of the Olympics Basketball competition in Berlin 1936.

=== Establishment as a competitor at the global stage (1937–1976) ===
After 1936, Japan Henceforth, they participated almost every time until 1976. Team Japan was a regular at world tournaments. It had its debut at the FIBA World Championship in 1963. It was the top team in Asia, as it won the championship there in 1965 and 1971.

At the 1976 Summer Olympics, Japan's Shigeaki Abe put up a noteworthy performance of 38 points and 10 assists against Puerto Rico.

=== Continued success (1995–1998) ===
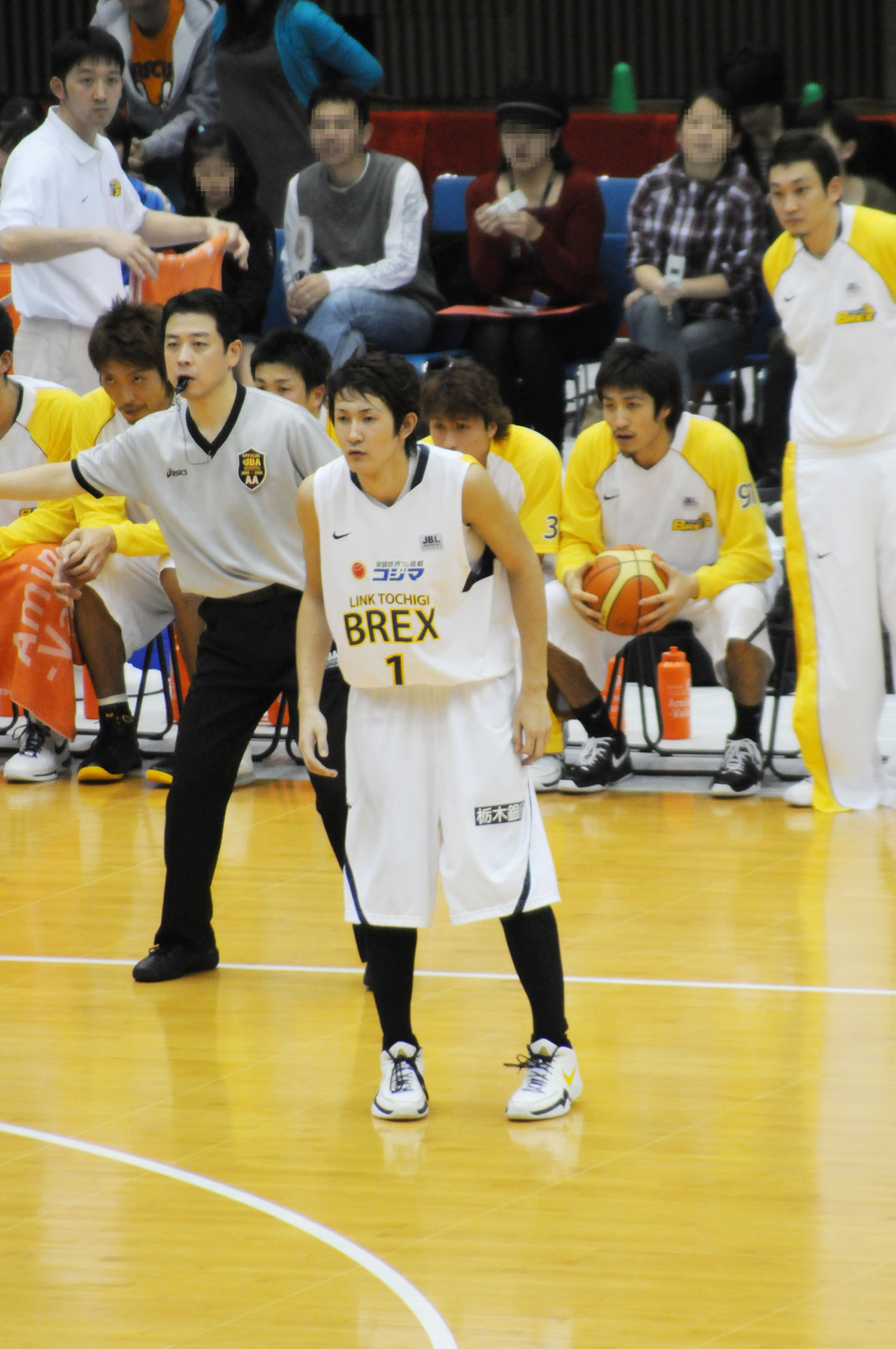
Takuya Kawamura drew the interest of scouts worldwide

As runner-up at the Fukuoka Universiade in 1995, Team Nippon (as the Japanese are also called) had a streak of success and qualified for the 1998 FIBA World Championship, its first qualification in over 30 years. Coached by the Croat Željko Pavličević, the team played well but did not make it out of the primary round, where it lost its fourth-place battle against former semi-finalist New Zealand.

=== Competition from the Middle East intensifies (1999–2009) ===
In the late 1990s, Japan played against more intense competition from the Middle East. Combined with many player absences from the team, Team Nippon struggled to win medals at the Asian Championships since its silver medal in 1997. At the 2008 event in their home country (Tokushima), the team finished at the 8th position and missed qualification for both the Beijing Olympic Tournament and qualification to the 2010 FIBA World Championship. At the 2009 FIBA Asia tournament the team sank to No. 10 position, its worst performance. This was partly due to the change of the head coach just before the tournament.

=== Recovery (2010–present) ===
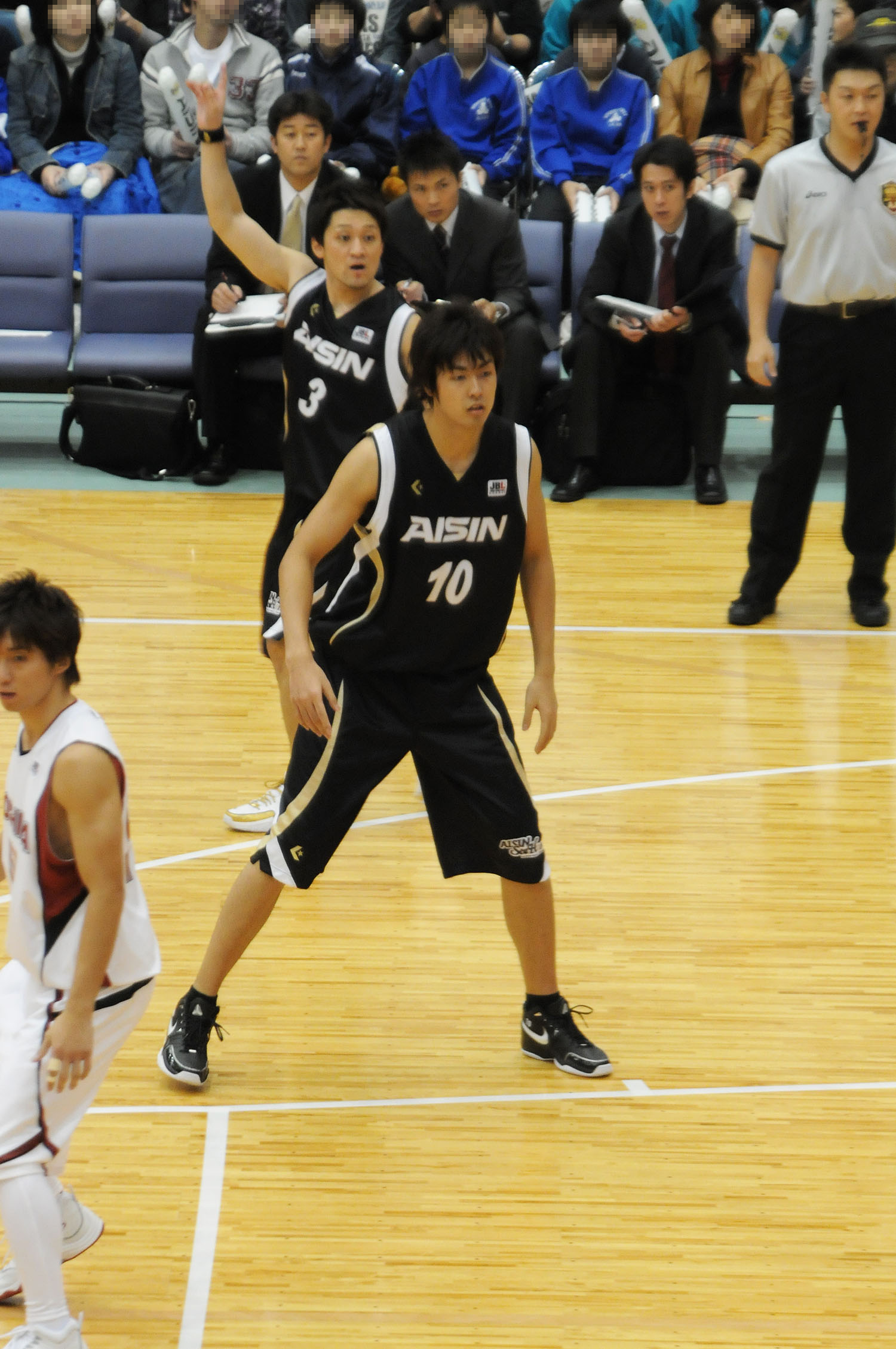
Kosuke Takeuchi had been the face of the national team for many years

Overshadowed by the drawbacks at international competitions, Japan brought forth several of Asia's elite basketball players who competed in the NBA and in Europe. These players included Yuta Tabuse, J.R. Sakuragi, Takuya Kawamura, Takumi Ishizaki and others. However, they rarely played for the national team, which caused Team Japan to fall behind Asia's elite competition from Iran, South Korea, the Philippines and China.

To better the results, the American coach Thomas Wisman took over the management of the team in 2010 and made some considerable improvements. Wisman just came off a phenomenal year in the Japanese Basketball League (JBL) where he had led Tochigi Brex to its first and only national title. At the FIBA Asia Stankovic Cup in 2010, Team Nippon was defeated by host Lebanon but exceeded expectations as it finished as runner-up. At the 2011 FIBA Asia Championship, the listed goal of the Final Four was missed as the team reached the 7th position out of 15. The team managed to defeat finalists Jordan but then lost to South Korea in the first playoff round and was defeated.

In March 2012, the Japan Association dismissed Wissmann and the country's coaching legend Kimikazu Suzuki took over the reins of the team. Suzuki, concurrently coaching the Aisin SeaHorses Mikawa had initial success as Team Nippon finished Runner-up at the next FIBA Asia Challenge tournament, which was held in Tokyo in September 2012. Aimed at the acquisition of a 2014 FIBA World Cup berth, the team, however, finished the 2013 FIBA Asia Championship in 9th place.

After Japan's missed opportunity to reach the World Cup, Team Nippon entered the 2015 FIBA Asia Championship, with the return of Yuta Tabuse and several other top players from the national team. They would win two of their three preliminary round games, to eventually make it all the way to the semi-finals of the competition for the first time since 1997. Although they would ultimately fall short in the round against the Philippines, and subsequently losing the third place game to Iran.

Two years later, Japan failed to make it into the quarter-finals at the 2017 FIBA Asia Cup, being defeated by South Korea in the qualification to the round. Following the event, Japan entered Asian Qualifiers for the 2019 FIBA World Cup, where they would amass an (8–5) record during their qualifying campaign to reach the finals. At the competition, Japan endured a disappointing tournament, losing all three of their group phase games, as well as their two classification matches to finish (0–5) to be eliminated.

Japan co-hosted the 2023 FIBA World Cup along with the Philippines and Indonesia. After losing their first game of the group phase against the eventually champions Germany, Akatsuki Japan obtained their first ever victory against a European opponent Finland 98–88. Following the historic win, Japan lost their final group game versus Australia, and sent to the classification round before exiting the tournament.

Japan played at the 2024 Olympics in Paris, and were allocated in Group B. In the first game, they lost to Germany. In the second game, Japan was close to an upset win against hosts France, conceding the game only after overtime. Yuki Kawamura followed Kevin Durant and Luol Deng as the third player in Olympic history to have more than 25+ points, 5+ rebounds and 5+ assists. They were eliminated after losing to Brazil on the final gameday.

== Competitive record ==
=== Olympic Games ===
Year	Position	Tournament	Host
1936	9	Basketball at the 1936 Summer Olympics	Berlin, Germany
1956	10	Basketball at the 1956 Summer Olympics	Melbourne, Australia
1960	15	Basketball at the 1960 Summer Olympics	Rome, Italy
1964	10	Basketball at the 1964 Summer Olympics	Tokyo, Japan
1972	14	Basketball at the 1972 Summer Olympics	Munich, West Germany
1976	11	Basketball at the 1976 Summer Olympics	Montreal, Canada
2020	11	Basketball at the 2020 Summer Olympics	Tokyo, Japan
2024	11	Basketball at the 2024 Summer Olympics	Paris, France

=== FIBA World Cup ===
FIBA World Cup record
Year	Position	Pld	W	L
(Argentina) 1950	No qualification for Asia			
(Brazil) 1954	Did not qualify			
(Chile) 1959	Did not qualify			
(Brazil) 1963	Preliminary round	8	1	7
(Uruguay) 1967	Classification round	8	2	6
(Socialist Federal Republic of Yugoslavia) 1970	Did not qualify			
(Puerto Rico) 1974	Did not qualify			
(Philippines) 1978	Did not qualify			
(Colombia) 1982	Did not qualify			
(Spain) 1986	Did not qualify			
(Argentina) 1990	Did not qualify			
(Canada) 1994	Did not qualify			
(Greece) 1998	Classification round	5	1	4
(United States) 2002	Did not qualify			
(Japan) 2006	Preliminary round	5	1	4
(Turkey) 2010	Did not qualify			
(Spain) 2014	Did not qualify			
(China) 2019	Preliminary round	5	0	5
(Philippines) (Japan) (Indonesia) 2023	Classification round	5	3	2
(Qatar) 2027	To be determined			
(France) 2031	To be determined			
Total	6/19	36	8	28

=== FIBA Asia Cup ===
FIBA Asia Cup record
Year	Position	Pld	W	L	PF	PA	PD
(Philippines) 1960	3rd place	9	5	4			
(Taiwan) 1963	Did not enter						
(Malaysia) 1965	Champions	9	8	1			
(South Korea) 1967	3rd place	9	7	2			
(Thailand) 1969	Runners-up	8	7	1			
(Japan) 1971	Champions	8	8	0			
(Philippines) 1973	4th place	10	6	4			
(Thailand) 1975	Runners-up	8	7	1			
(Malaysia) 1977	3rd place	9	7	2			
(Japan) 1979	Runners-up	8	7	1			
(India) 1981	3rd place	7	5	2			
(Hong Kong) 1983	Runners-up	7	5	2			
(Malaysia) 1985	5th place	6	5	1			
(Thailand) 1987	3rd place	8	6	2			
(China) 1989	4th place	7	4	3			
(Japan) 1991	3rd place	8	5	3			
(Indonesia) 1993	7th place	6	3	3			
(South Korea) 1995	3rd place	9	7	2			
(Saudi Arabia) 1997	Runners-up	7	4	3			
(Japan) 1999	5th place	7	5	2			
(China) 2001	6th place	6	2	4			
(China) 2003	6th place	7	3	4			
(Qatar) 2005	5th place	8	5	3			
(Japan) 2007	8th place	8	4	4			
(China) 2009	10th place	8	3	5			
(China) 2011	7th place	9	5	4			
(Philippines) 2013	9th place	7	3	4			
(China) 2015	4th place	9	5	4			
(Lebanon) 2017	9th place	4	2	2			
(Indonesia) 2022	7th place	5	3	2	480	392	+88
(Saudi Arabia) 2025	9th place	4	2	2	344	306	+38
Total	30/31	225	148	77			

=== Asian Games ===
Asian Games
Year	Position	Pld	W	L
(India) 1951	Runners-up	4	3	1
(Philippines) 1954	3rd place	6	3	3
(Japan) 1958	3rd place	7	6	1
(Indonesia) 1962	Runners-up	8	7	1
(Thailand) 1966	4th place	6	4	2
(Thailand) 1970	3rd place	8	5	3
(Iran) 1974	7th place	7	4	3
(Thailand) 1978	4th place	8	5	3
(India) 1982	3rd place	7	5	2
(South Korea) 1986	6th place	7	2	5
(China) 1990	4th place	7	3	4
(Japan) 1994	3rd place	5	3	2
(Thailand) 1998	10th place	5	2	3
(South Korea) 2002	6th place	6	2	4
(Qatar) 2006	6th place	8	4	4
(China) 2010	4th place	8	5	3
(South Korea) 2014	3rd place	7	4	3
(Indonesia) 2018	7th place	6	3	3
(China) 2022	8th place	6	3	3
(Japan) 2026	Runners-up	6	4	2
Total	19/19	132	77	55

=== East Asian Games ===
East Asian Games
Year	Position	Pld	W	L
(China) 1993	5th place			
(South Korea) 1997	5th place			
(Japan) 2001	3rd place			
(Macau) 2005	Runners-up			
(Hong Kong) 2009	3rd place			
(China) 2013	4th place			
Total	6/6	-	-	-

== Team ==
=== Current roster ===
Roster for the 2025 FIBA Asia Cup.

Japan men's national basketball team – 2025 FIBA Asia Cup roster
Players
Coaches

Pos.	No.	Name	Age – Date of birth	Height	Club	Ctr.
PG	2	Yuki Togashi	32 – 30 July 1993	1.67 m (5 ft 6 in)	Chiba Jets	(Japan)
SF	4	Akira Jacobs	21 – 13 April 2004	2.03 m (6 ft 8 in)	Fordham Rams	(United States)
PG	7	Kai Toews	26 – 17 September 1998	1.88 m (6 ft 2 in)	Alvark Tokyo	(Japan)
SF	13	Ren Kanechika	22 – 11 March 2003	1.96 m (6 ft 5 in)	Chiba Jets	(Japan)
C	14	Kano Toyoshige	23 – 6 October 2001	2.06 m (6 ft 9 in)	Sun Rockers Shibuya	(Japan)
SF	18	Yudai Baba	29 – 7 November 1995	1.95 m (6 ft 5 in)	Nagasaki Velca	(Japan)
SG	19	Yudai Nishida	26 – 13 March 1999	1.90 m (6 ft 3 in)	SeaHorses Mikawa	(Japan)
PG	23	John Harper Jr.	22 – 9 February 2003	1.81 m (5 ft 11 in)	Sun Rockers Shibuya	(Japan)
C	24	Josh Hawkinson (C, NP)	30 – 23 June 1995	2.08 m (6 ft 10 in)	Sun Rockers Shibuya	(Japan)
G	30	Keisei Tominaga	24 – 1 February 2001	1.88 m (6 ft 2 in)	Levanga Hokkaido	(Japan)
SF	91	Hirotaka Yoshii	27 – 4 June 1998	1.96 m (6 ft 5 in)	San-en NeoPhoenix	(Japan)
C	99	Koya Kawamata	27 – 16 June 1998	2.04 m (6 ft 8 in)	Nagasaki Velca	(Japan)

Head coach

- (United States) Tom Hovasse

Assistant coach(es)

- (Japan) Geoffrey Katsuhisa
- (Japan) Norio Sassa

Legend

- (C) Team captain
- (NP) Naturalized player
- Club – describes last
  club before the tournament
- Age – describes age
  on 5 August 2025

=== Head coaches ===
- (Japan) Nobuaki Asano – 1936
- (Japan) Keishu Makiyama – 1951–1954
- (Japan) Tetsuo Oba – 1954–1956
- (Japan) Seiichi Morisawa – 1957–1960
- (Japan) M. Maeda – 1956, 1960
- (Japan) Shiro Yoshii – 1962–1964
- (Brazil) Marco Antonio de Venetis – 1964
- (Japan) Tadashi Miura – 1965
- (Japan) Shutaro Shoji – 1966
- (Japan) Shigeyoshi Kasahara – 1967
- (Japan) Shiro Yoshii – 1967
- (Japan) Keishu Makiyama – 1969
- (Japan) Shigeyoshi Kasahara – 1970
- (Japan) Kuninaka Taketomi – 1971
- (Japan) Shigeyoshi Kasahara – 1972–1973
- (Japan) Masahiko Yoshida – 1974–1976
- (Japan) Shigeyoshi Kasahara – 1977
- (Japan) Yoshiaki Shimizu – 1978
- (Japan) Tsunetoshi Akiyoshi – 1978–1979
- (Japan) Mototaka Kohama – 1979
- (Japan) Yoshiaki Shimizu – 1980–1983
- (Japan) Mototaka Kohama – 1984–1989
- (Japan) Yoshiaki Shimizu – 1990
- (Japan) Yoshinori Shimizu – 1991–1994
- (United States) James Gordon – 1994
- (Japan) Toshimitsu Kawachi – 1995–1996
- (Japan) Mototaka Kohama – 1996–2000
- (United States) Tom Newell – 2000
- (Japan) Kenji Yoshida – 2000–2002
- (Croatia) Željko Pavličević – 2003–06
- (Japan) Kimikazu Suzuki – 2006–2007
- (United States) David Hobbs – 2009
- (Japan) Osamu Kuraishi – 2009
- (Japan) Shuji Ono – 2009
- (United States) Thomas Wisman – 2010–12
- (Japan) Kimikazu Suzuki – 2012–13
- (Japan) Kenji Hasegawa – 2014–2016
- (Montenegro) Luka Pavićević – 2016–17
- (Japan) Akira Rikukawa – 2017
- (Argentina) Julio César Lamas – 2017–2021
- (United States) Tom Hovasse – 2021–2026
- (Japan) Dai Oketani – 2026–present

=== Past rosters ===
1936 Olympic Games: finished 13th among 21 teams

Riichi Cho, T.Nakae, S.Ri, K.Yokoyama, T.Kanakogi, M.Maeda, U.Munakata, S.Matsui

1956 Olympic Games: finished 10th among 15 teams

Setsuo Nara, Jose Rodriguez, Kenichi Imaizumi, Hiroshi Saito, Reizo Ohira, Hitoshi Konno, Takashi Itoyama, Manabu Fujita, Takeo Sugiyama, Tetsuro Noborisaka, Riichi Arai (Coach: M.Maeda)

1960 Olympic Games: finished 15th among 16 teams

Setsuo Nara, Shutaro Shoji, Hiroshi Saito, Takashi Itoyama, Takeo Sugiyama, Kenichi Imaizumi, Yasukuni Oshima, Shoji Kamata, Masashi Shiga, Takashi Masuda, Kaoru Wakabayashi, Hideo Kanekawa (Coach: M.Maeda)

1963 World Championship: finished 13th among 13 teams

Setsuo Nara, Takashi Masuda, Masashi Shiga, Yasukuni Oshima, Kaoru Wakabayashi, Keizo Okayama, Isamu Yamaguchi, Yoshikuni Awano, Fumihiko Moroyama, Katsuji Tsunoda, Kunihiko Nakamura, Yoshitaka Egawa (Coach: Shiro Yoshii)

1964 Olympic Games: finished 10th among 16 teams

Takashi Masuda, Setsuo Nara, Masashi Shiga, Kaoru Wakabayashi, Fumihiko Moroyama, Katsuji Tsunoda, Kunihiko Nakamura, Yoshitaka Egawa, Nobuo Kaiho, Akira Kodama, Katsuo Bai, Seiji Fujie (Coach: Marco Antonio de Venetis)

1967 World Championship: finished 11th among 13 teams

Kaoru Wakabayashi, Fumihiko Moroyama, Kunihiko Nakamura, Yoshitaka Egawa, Akira Kodama, Masatomo Taniguchi, Nobuo Hattori, Kenji Soda, Masahiko Yoshida, Isao Kimura, Seiji Igarashi (Coach: Shutaro Shoji)

1972 Olympic Games: finished 14th among 16 teams

Kenji Soda, Masatomo Taniguchi, Nobuo Hattori, Kunihiko Yokoyama, Atsushi Somamoto, Hirofumi Numata, Shigeaki Abe, Mineo Yoshikawa, Kazufumi Sakai, Nobuo Chigusa, Satoshi Mori, Katsuhiko Sugita (Coach: S.Kasahara)

1976 Olympic Games: finished 11th among 12 teams

Hirofumi Numata, Shigeaki Abe, Satoshi Mori, Norihiko Kitahara, Hideki Hamaguchi, Kiyohide Kuwata, Koji Yamamoto, Yutaka Fujimoto, Shigeto Shimizu, Fumio Saito, Nobuo Chigusa, Shoji Yuki (Coach: Masahiko Yoshida)

1998 World Championship: finished 14th among 16 teams

Kenichi Sako, Maikeru Takahashi, Akifumi Yamasaki, Hiroshi Nagano, Makoto Hasegawa, Takehiko Orimo, Satoshi Sakumoto, Hiroyuki Tominaga, Takahiro Setsumasa, Makoto Minamiyama, Takeshi Yuki, Satoru Furuta (Coach: Mototaka Kohama)

2006 World Championship: finished 20th among 24 teams

Takehiko Orimo, Satoru Furuta, Takahiro Setsumasa, Shunsuke Ito, Joji Takeuchi, Kei Igarashi, Shinsuke Kashiwagi, Daiji Yamada, Ryota Sakurai, Kosuke Takeuchi, Takuya Kawamura, Tomoo Amino (Coach: Zeljko Pavlicevic)

2016 FIBA World Olympic Qualifying Tournaments

Roster for the 2016 FIBA World Olympic Qualifying Tournaments:

Japan men's national basketball team roster
Players
Coaches

Pos.	No.	Name	Age – Date of birth	Height	Club
PG	0	Yuta Tabuse	35 – 5 October 1980	1.73 m (5 ft 8 in)	Link Tochigi Brex	(Japan)
PG	3	Naoto Tsuji	26 – 8 September 1989	1.85 m (6 ft 1 in)	Toshiba BT	(Japan)
SG	6	Makoto Hiejima	24 – 11 August 1990	1.90 m (6 ft 3 in)	Aisin SeaHorses Mikawa	(Japan)
C	8	Atsuya Ota	32 – 6 April 1984	2.06 m (6 ft 9 in)	Higashimikawa Phoenix	(Japan)
C	10	Kosouke Takeuchi	31 – 29 January 1985	2.06 m (6 ft 9 in)	Hiroshima Dragonflies	(Japan)
PG	11	Ryoma Hashimoto	28 – 11 May 1988	1.78 m (5 ft 10 in)	Aisin SeaHorses Mikawa	(Japan)
F	12	Yuta Watanabe	21 – 13 October 1994	2.01 m (6 ft 7 in)	George Washington Colonials	(United States)
C	15	Joji Takeuchi	31 – 29 January 1985	2.07 m (6 ft 9 in)	Hitachi SR	(Japan)
G	16	Keijuro Matsui	30 – 16 October 1985	1.88 m (6 ft 2 in)	Toyota Alvark	(Japan)
SG	25	Takatoshi Furukawa	28 – 20 October 1987	1.90 m (6 ft 3 in)	Link Tochigi Brex	(Japan)
SF	34	Ryumo Ono	28 – 6 January 1988	1.98 m (6 ft 6 in)	Chiba Jets	(Japan)
G	42	Kenta Hirose	26 – 29 August 1989	1.93 m (6 ft 4 in)	Hitachi SR	(Japan)

Head coach

- (Japan) Kenji Hasegawa

Assistant coach(es)

- (Japan) Norio Sassa

Legend

- Club – describes last
  club before the tournament
- Age – describes age
  on 4 July 2016

2016 FIBA Asia Challenge

At the 2016 FIBA Asia Challenge.

Japan men's national basketball team – 2016 FIBA Asia Challenge roster
Players
Coaches

Pos.	No.	Name	Age – Date of birth	Height	Club	Ctr.
PG	3	Naoto Tsuji	27 – 8 September 1989	1.85 m (6 ft 1 in)	Kawasaki Brave Thunders	(Japan)
PF	5	Yuki Mitsuhara	26 – 12 December 1989	1.98 m (6 ft 6 in)	Sunrockers Shibuya	(Japan)
PG	6	Makoto Hiejima	26 – 11 August 1990	1.90 m (6 ft 3 in)	Seahorses Mikawa	(Japan)
PG	7	Ryusei Shinoyama	28 – 20 July 1988	1.78 m (5 ft 10 in)	Kawasaki Brave Thunders	(Japan)
C	8	Atsuya Ota	32 – 4 June 1984	2.06 m (6 ft 9 in)	San en Neophoneix	(Japan)
PG	11	Ryoma Hashimoto	28 – 11 May 1988	1.78 m (5 ft 10 in)	Seahorses Mikawa	(Japan)
SF	20	Takanobu Nishikawa	24 – 14 January 1992	1.96 m (6 ft 5 in)	Levanga Hokkiado	(Japan)
PG	22	Yuma Fujii	24 – 23 December 1991	1.78 m (5 ft 10 in)	Kawasaki Brave Thunders	(Japan)
SG	25	Takatoshi Furukawa	28 – 20 October 1987	1.90 m (6 ft 3 in)	Tochigi Brex	(Japan)
PF	35	Ira Brown	34 – 3 August 1982	1.93 m (6 ft 4 in)	Sunrockers Shibuya	(Japan)
PF	43	Yuya Nagayoshi	25 – 14 July 1991	1.98 m (6 ft 6 in)	Kawasaki Brave Thunders	(Japan)
SF	88	Tenketsu Harimoto	24 – 8 January 1992	1.97 m (6 ft 6 in)	Nagoya Diamond Dolphins	(Japan)

Head coach

- (Japan) Kenji Hasegawa

Assistant coach(es)

- (Japan) Kenji Sato

Legend

- Club – describes last
  club before the tournament
- Age – describes age
  on 9 September 2016

2023 FIBA Basketball World Cup: finished 19th among 32 teams

Roster for the 2023 FIBA Basketball World Cup.

Japan national basketball team – 2023 FIBA Basketball World Cup roster
Players
Coaches

Pos.	No.	Name	Age – Date of birth	Height	Club	Ctr.
PG	2	Yuki Togashi (C)	30 – 30 July 1993	1.67 m (5 ft 6 in)	Chiba Jets	(Japan)
PG	5	Yuki Kawamura	22 – 2 May 2001	1.72 m (5 ft 8 in)	Yokohama B-Corsairs	(Japan)
SG	6	Makoto Hiejima	33 – 11 August 1990	1.91 m (6 ft 3 in)	Utsunomiya Brex	(Japan)
SF	12	Yuta Watanabe	28 – 13 October 1994	2.06 m (6 ft 9 in)	Phoenix Suns	(United States)
SG	18	Yudai Baba	27 – 7 November 1995	1.95 m (6 ft 5 in)	Texas Legends	(United States)
SG	19	Yudai Nishida	24 – 13 March 1999	1.90 m (6 ft 3 in)	SeaHorses Mikawa	(Japan)
C	24	Josh Hawkinson	28 – 23 June 1995	2.08 m (6 ft 10 in)	Sun Rockers Shibuya	(Japan)
G	30	Keisei Tominaga	22 – 1 February 2001	1.88 m (6 ft 2 in)	Nebraska Cornhuskers	(United States)
SF	31	Shuta Hara	29 – 17 December 1993	1.87 m (6 ft 2 in)	Chiba Jets	(Japan)
PF	75	Soichiro Inoue	24 – 7 May 1999	2.01 m (6 ft 7 in)	Sun Rockers Shibuya	(Japan)
SF	91	Hirotaka Yoshii	25 – 4 June 1998	1.96 m (6 ft 5 in)	Alvark Tokyo	(Japan)
C	99	Koya Kawamata	25 – 16 June 1998	2.04 m (6 ft 8 in)	Shiga Lakes	(Japan)

Head coach

- (United States) Tom Hovasse

Assistant coach(es)

- (United States) Corey Gaines
- (Japan) Geoffrey Katsuhisa
- (Japan) Yoshio Sasa

Legend

- (C) Team captain
- Club – describes last
  club before the tournament
- Age – describes age
  on 25 August 2023

== Kit ==
=== Manufacturer ===
2015–2019 : Under Armour
2021–2022 : Nike, Inc.
2022–present : Jordan Brand

=== Sponsor ===
2015: Xebio
2016: Sportsnavi live
2017–present: SoftBank

== See also ==
- Japan women's national basketball team
- Japan men's national under-19 basketball team
- Japan men's national under-17 basketball team
- Japan men's national 3x3 team
