= John Harper Jr. =

Japanese basketball player (born 2003)

John Harper Jr. ハーパージュニア
- Harper with the Sunrockers

No. 3 – Tokyo Sunrockers
- Position: Point guard
- League: B.League

Personal information
- Born: February 9, 2003 (age 23) Okinawa, Japan
- Listed height: 181 cm (5 ft 11 in)
- Listed weight: 82 kg (181 lb)

Career information
- High school: Fukuoka Daiichi
- College: Tokai
- Playing career: 2021–present

Career history
- 2021: Ryukyu Golden Kings
- 2023: Gunma Crane Thunders
- 2024–present: Tokyo Sunrockers
Medals
Men's basketball
Representing Japan
Asian Games
Silver medal – second place	2026 Aichi–Nagoya	Team

John Lawrence Harper Jr. (Note: In Japanese, John Lawrence Harper Jr.'s name is rendered as Jan Rōrensu Hāpājunia (ジャン・ローレンス・ハーパージュニア). This is his registered name in the B.League. Prior to the 2025–26 B.League season, his registered name is Harper John Lawrence Jr. (ハーパー・ジャン・ローレンス・ジュニア)) is a Japanese basketball player who plays for the Tokyo Sunrockers of the B.League.

== Early life and education ==
John Harper Jr. was born on 9 February 2003 in the Okinawa Prefecture to an American father and a Japanese mother. He attended the Okinawa Municipal Koza Junior High School in Okinawa City.

Harper then studied at the Fukuoka Daiichi High School, where he played for the schoo's basketball team. He also attended Tokai University.

== Club career ==
=== B.League special designated player and college career ===
The Ryukyu Golden Kings of the B.League on January 2021 announced Harper to be their special designated player. Harper debuted on February 6, 2021, at 17 years, 11 months, and 28 days old, becoming the youngest player to appear in a B.League game. The following day, he set another age record by becoming the youngest player to score in the league.

After his stint with Ryuku, Harper enrolled with Tokai University in April 2021. He joined the Gunma Crane Thunders in January 2023.

The Sunrockers Shibuya announced Harper joined the team in January 2024 to help them in the latter stages of the 2023–24 season.

=== Shibuya/Tokyo Sunrockers ===
Harper started his professional career by signing a contract with the Sunrockers Shibuya in December 2024, in the middle of the 2024–25 season. At the time, he was still a student at Tokai University and was expected to graduate in March 2025.

== National team ==
Harper has been part of the Japan youth national team program as early as 2018. He played for the Japan U19 team in the 2021 FIBA Under-19 Basketball World Cup in Latvia.

He made his debut for the Japan senior national team in the February 2025 window of the qualifiers of the 2025 FIBA Asia Cup.

At the 2026 Asian Games, held in Japan, Harper helped Japan reach the final, where they lost to South Korea, earning a silver medal.
