= Ryoma Hashimoto =

Japanese basketball player

Ryoma Hashimoto 橋本竜馬
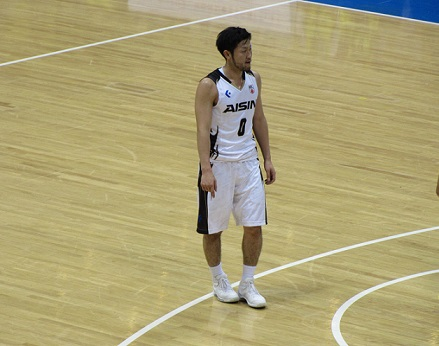

No. 0 – Alvark Tokyo
- Position: Point guard
- League: B.League

Personal information
- Born: May 11, 1988 (age 38) Sawara-ku, Fukuoka, Japan
- Listed height: 5 ft 10 in (1.78 m)
- Listed weight: 179 lb (81 kg)

Career information
- High school: Fukuoka University Ohori
- College: Aoyama Gakuin University
- Playing career: 2011–present

Career history
- 2011–2018: SeaHorses Mikawa
- 2018-2019: Ryukyu Golden Kings
- 2019-2023: Levanga Hokkaido
- 2023-oresent: Alvark Tokyo
Medals
Men's basketball
Representing Japan
EABA Championship
Bronze medal – third place	2017 Nagano	Team

Ryoma Hashimoto (橋本 竜馬, Hashimoto Ryōma) is a Japanese professional basketball player, currently playing for the Levanga Hokkaido club of the B.League in Japan. He represented Japan's national basketball team at the 2015 FIBA Asia Championship in Changsha, China.

== Career statistics ==
Legend
GP	Games played	GS	Games started	MPG	Minutes per game
FG%	Field goal percentage	3P%	3-point field goal percentage	FT%	Free throw percentage
RPG	Rebounds per game	APG	Assists per game	SPG	Steals per game
BPG	Blocks per game	PPG	Points per game	**Bold**	Career high

Year	Team	GP	GS	MPG	FG%	3P%	FT%	RPG	APG	SPG	BPG	PPG
2013-14	Aisin	54		17.8	.409	.367	.802	2.0	1.7	0.9	0	5.6
2014-15	Aisin	54	24	23.3	.386	.350	.868	2.1	1.4	1.0	0.0	5.1
2015-16	Aisin	53	48	28.3	.393	.358	.729	2.8	1.6	1.0	0.1	6.3
2016-17	Mikawa	43	35	21.5	.427	.378	.875	2.1	1.6	0.7	0.0	5.7
2017-18	Mikawa	52	40	25.3	.418	.390	.847	2.5	3.3	1.3	0.0	7.0
2018-19	Ryukyu	56	14	19.0	.352	.352	.833	1.7	1.9	0.7	0.1	3.4
