= Hirotaka Yoshii =

Japanese basketball player

No. 8 – Ibaraki Robots
- Position: Small forward
- League: B.League

Personal information
- Born: 4 June 1998 (age 28) Osaka Prefecture, Japan
- Listed height: 1.96 m (6 ft 5 in)
- Listed weight: 95 kg (209 lb)

Career information
- High school: Osaka Gakuin University High School
- College: Osaka Gakuin University
- Playing career: 2018–present

Career history
- 2018–2024: Alvark Tokyo
- 2024–2026: San-en NeoPhoenix
- 2026–present: Ibaraki Robots

Career highlights
- Represented Japan at the 2023 FIBA Basketball World Cup

Hirotaka Yoshii (Japanese: 吉井 裕鷹; born 4 June 1998) is a Japanese professional basketball player for the Ibaraki Robots of the B.League. He plays as a small forward.

== Professional career ==
Yoshii began his professional career as a specially designated athlete with Alvark Tokyo. In June 2025, he signed with San-en NeoPhoenix for the upcoming 2025–26 season.

== National team career ==
In 2022, Yoshii made his debut for the Japan men's national basketball team during the 2023 FIBA Basketball World Cup Asian Qualifiers and the 2022 FIBA Asia Cup. He represented Japan at the 2023 FIBA Basketball World Cup, and continued to contribute in the 2025 FIBA Asia Cup qualifiers, averaging 7.5 points, 4 rebounds, and 3.5 assists per game.
