= Norio Sassa =

Japanese basketball coach

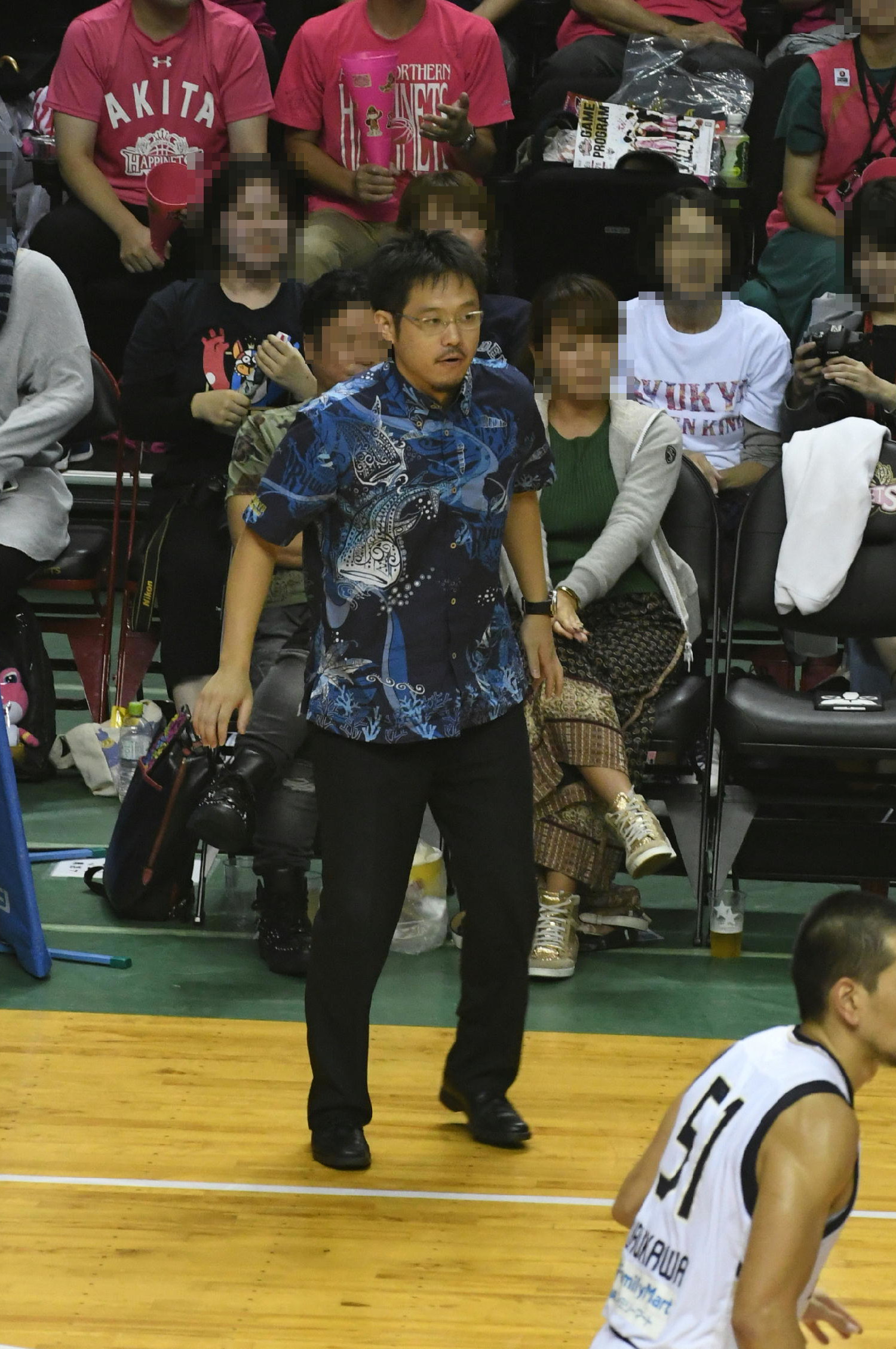

Utsunomiya Brex
- Position: Head coach
- League: B.League

Personal information
- Born: May 13, 1984 (age 42) Tokyo

Career information
- High school: Seikei (Musashino, Tokyo)
- College: Tokai University
- Coaching career: 2005–present

Career history

Coaching
- 2005-2009: Tokai University
- 2009-2012: Hitachi SunRockers (asst)
- 2013-2016: Link Tochigi Brex (asst)
- 2014-2017: Japan (asst)
- 2017-2019: Ryukyu Golden Kings
- 2020-present: Utsunomiya Brex (support)

Norio Sassa (佐々宜央, Sassa Norio) is the former Head coach of the Utsunomiya Brex in the Japanese B.League. He spent his childhood in America for eight years.

== Head coaching record ==
Legend
Regular season	G	Games coached	W	Games won	L	Games lost	W–L %	Win–loss %
Playoffs	PG	Playoff games	PW	Playoff wins	PL	Playoff losses	PW–L %	Playoff win–loss %

Team	Year	G	W	L	W–L%	Finish	PG	PW	PL	PW–L%	Result
Ryukyu Golden Kings	2017-18	60	42	18	.700	1st in Western	5	2	3	.400	Lost in 2nd round
Ryukyu Golden Kings	2018-19	60	40	20	.667	1st in Western	6	3	3	.500	Lost in 2nd round
Ryukyu Golden Kings	2019-20	20	13	7	.650	fired	-	-	-	–	-
