= Akira Jacobs =

Japanese basketball player (born 2004)

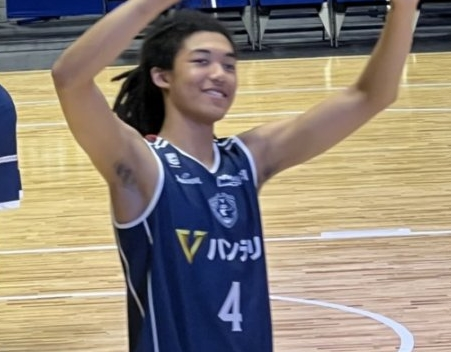
- Jacobs with the Yokohama B-Corsairs in 2022

No. 34 – Fordham Rams
- Position: Forward
- League: Atlantic 10 Conference

Personal information
- Born: April 13, 2004 (age 22) Yokohama, Japan
- Listed height: 6 ft 10 in (2.08 m)
- Listed weight: 220 lb (100 kg)

Career information
- High school: Redondo Union (Redondo Beach, California); Dymally (Los Angeles, California)
- College: Hawaii (2023–2025); Fordham (2025–present)
- Playing career: 2021–present

Career history
- 2021–2022: Yokohama B-Corsairs
Medals
Men's basketball
Representing Japan
FIBA Asia Under-18 Championship
Silver medal – second place	2022 Iran	Japan

Tajon Akira Jacobs (Japanese: ジェイコブス 晶, born April 13, 2004) is a Japanese basketball player for the Fordham Rams of the Atlantic 10 Conference. He was a member of the Japanese men's basketball team at the 2024 Summer Olympics.

== Early life ==
Jacobs was born in Yokohama, Japan, to a Japanese mother and an American father who was serving in the military. He moved with his family to Southern California a few months after he was born. Jacobs started playing basketball at the age of four because his mother was a fan and gave him basketball merchandise. He played on the basketball teams when he attended Redondo Union High School and Dymally High School in California.

Jacobs regularly visited Japan on trips as a child. While on a trip there when he was aged 16, he decided to stay so he could explore new opportunities.

== Basketball career ==
=== Early career (2021–2023) ===
Jacobs joined the under-18 team of the Yokohama B-Corsairs for the 2021–22 season. He was promoted to the senior professional team as a special designated player and became the youngest player to appear in a first division B.League game when he debuted for the B-Corsairs on November 13, 2021, at the age of 17 years and 7 months. On February 3, 2022, he scored his first points as the youngest player in B.League history to score in a game.

Jacobs appeared at the Basketball Without Borders Asia camp in 2022 and earned the Patrick Baumann Sportsmanship Award. On September 30, 2022, Jacobs joined the NBA Global Academy, a basketball training program at the Australian Institute of Sport in Canberra. He was the first Japanese prospect to join an NBA Academy on a full-time basis.

=== Hawaii (2023–2025) ===
On July 14, 2023, the Hawaii Rainbow Warriors announced that they had signed Jacobs to become the first Japanese player to join the program. Jacobs chose to play for the Rainbow Warriors because of Hawaii's links to Japanese culture and its closeness to both Japan and California. He averaged 2.4 points in 28 games during his freshman season.

=== Fordham (2025–Present) ===
On April 29, 2025, the Fordham Rams announced they had signed Jacobs.

== National team career ==
Jacobs was a member of the under-18 Japanese men's national team that won the silver medal at the 2022 FIBA U18 Asian Championship; he was injured during the second game and missed the rest of the tournament. He played for the under-19 team at the 2023 FIBA Under-19 Basketball World Cup and averaged 17 points per game. Jacobs was included on the extended training camp roster for the Japan senior national team at the 2023 FIBA Basketball World Cup.

Jacobs was invited to Japan's basketball training camp for the 2024 Paris Olympics and named to their final roster.

== Personal life ==
Jacobs holds dual Japanese and American citizenship.
