= Kenji Hasegawa =

Japanese basketball coach (born 1960)

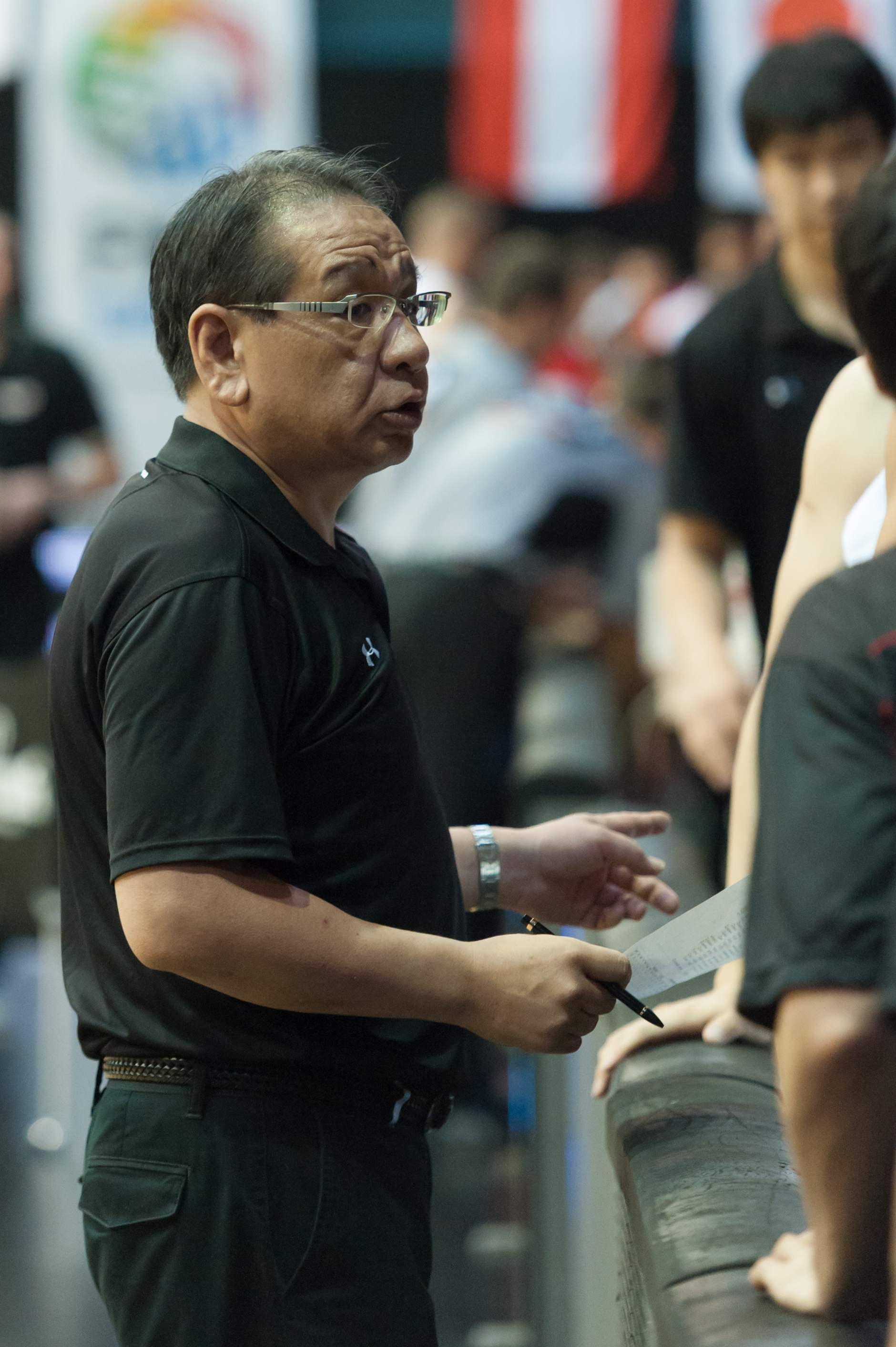

Personal information
- Born: April 4, 1960 (age 66) Ichikawa, Chiba

Career information
- High school: Senshu University Matsudo
- College: Aoyama Gakuin University
- Position: Head coach

Career history

Coaching
- 1985–1988: Aoyama Gakuin University (assistant)
- 1997–2013, 1989–1993: Aoyama Gakuin University
- 2007: Japan (Universiade)
- 2014–2016: Japan
- 2017: Link Tochigi Brex

Kenji Hasegawa (長谷川健志, Hasegawa Kenji) is a Japanese basketball coach. He was the head coach of the Japan national basketball team from 2014 until his resignation in late 2016.

Hasegawa coached the Japanese Universiade team at the 2007 Summer Universiade in Bangkok, Thailand and the Aoyama Gakuin University basketball team. He led Aoyama to a quarter-finals appearance at the 2013 Emperor's Cup after beating Levanga Hokkaido.

== Head coaching record ==
Legend
| Regular season | G | Games coached | W | Games won | L | Games lost | W–L % | Win–loss % |
| Playoffs | PG | Playoff games | PW | Playoff wins | PL | Playoff losses | PW–L % | Playoff win–loss % |

| Team | Year | G | W | L | W–L% | Finish | PG | PW | PL | PW–L% | Result |
|---|---|---|---|---|---|---|---|---|---|---|---|
| Link Tochigi Brex | 2017 | 13 | 4 | 9 | .308 | Fired | - | - | - | – | |
