= Shigeaki Abe =

Japanese basketball player (born 1947)

Personal information
- Nationality: Japanese
- Born: 22 September 1947 (age 77); Tsuruoka, Japan
- Height: 1.78 m (5 ft 10 in)
- Weight: 70 kg (150 lb)

Sport
- Sport: Basketball

Shigeaki Abe (阿部 成章, Abe Shigeaki; born 22 September 1947) is a Japanese basketball player. He competed in the 1972 and 1976 Summer Olympics.

At the 1976 Summer Olympics, he put up a noteworthy performance of 38 points and 10 assists against Puerto Rico.
