= Koya Kawamata =

Japanese basketball player (born 1998)

No. 99 – Ryukyu Golden Kings
- Position: Center
- League: B.League

Personal information
- Born: 16 June 1998 (age 28) Tokushima, Tokushima, Japan
- Listed height: 6 ft 8 in (2.03 m)
- Listed weight: 243 lb (110 kg)

Career information
- High school: Tokushima Prefectural Jonan High School
- College: Tenri University
- Playing career: 2020–present

Career history
- 2020–2021: Saga Ballooners
- 2021–2024: Shiga Lakes
- 2024–2026: Nagasaki Velca
- 2026–present: Ryukyu Golden Kings

Career highlights
- B.League Most Impressive Player (2024)

Koya Kawamata (川真田 紘也, Kawamata Kōya; born June 16, 1998), nicknamed "Mikey" (マイキー), is a Japanese professional basketball player for the Ryukyu Golden Kings of the B.League.

== Professional career ==
During the 2020–21 B.League season, Kawamata played on the Saga Ballooners under special designated player status.

Following the 2020–21 season, Kawamata signed with the Shiga Lakes. While on the Lakes, he was given the nickname "Mikey" by his teammates. They chose the name as they thought his college nickname, "Matty" (マッティ)—a play on the end his family name, "mata"—did not suit him, and a character named Mikey from the series Tokyo Revengers was popular at the time.

On June 25, 2024, Kawamata signed with the Nagasaki Velca.

On June 8, 2026, it was announced that Kawamata had exercised his player option, ending his contract with the Velca and signing with the Ryukyu Golden Kings.

== National team career ==
Kawamata represented Japan at the 2023 FIBA Basketball World Cup and 2027 FIBA Basketball World Cup Asian Qualifiers.
