= Geoffrey Katsuhisa =

Japanese basketball coach

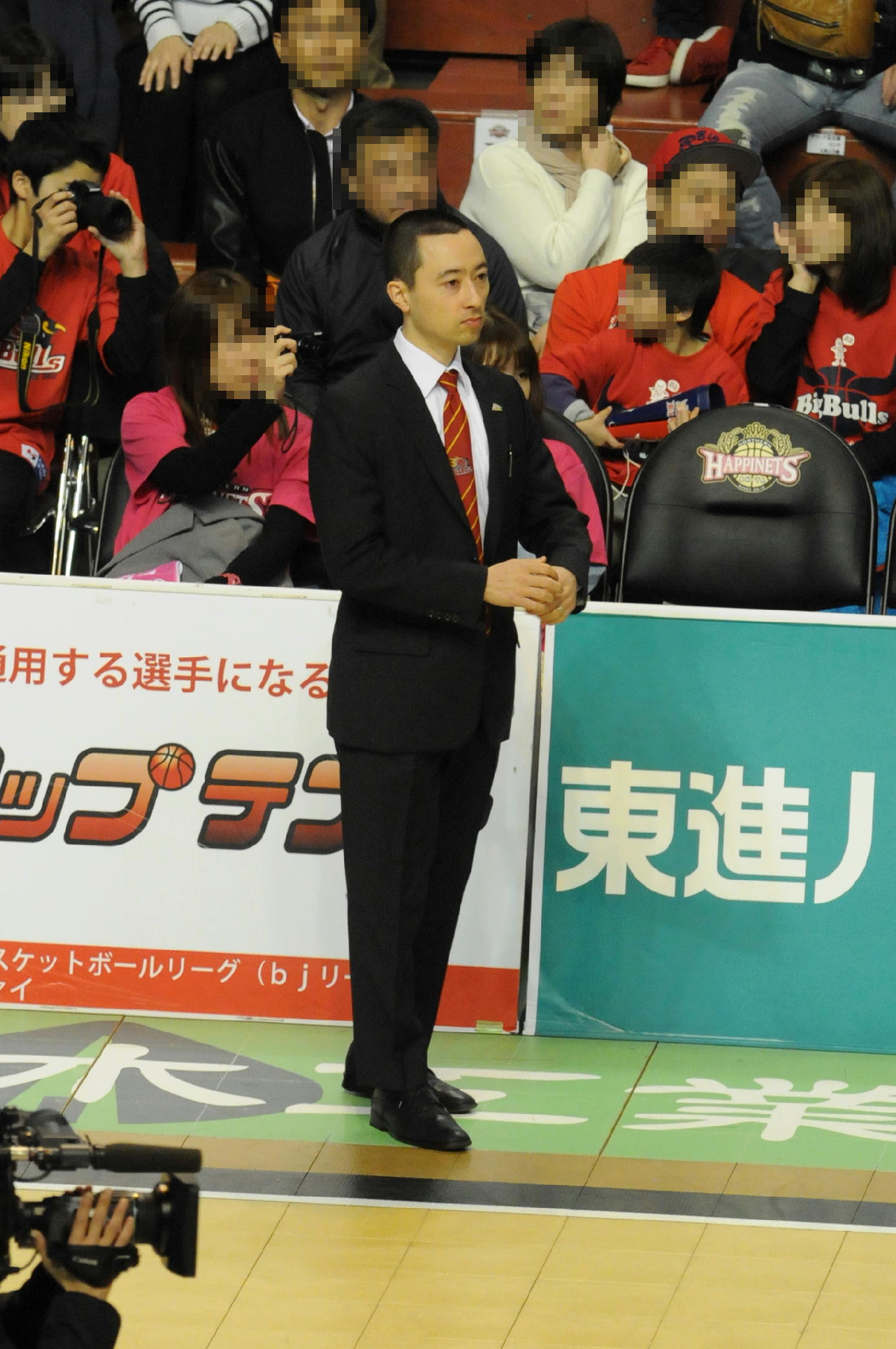
- Geoffrey Katsuhisa.jpg

Kawasaki Brave Thunders
- Position: Assistant coach
- League: B.League

Personal information
- Born: May 18, 1981 (age 45) Tokyo, Japan

Career information
- College: Santa Clara University

Career history

Coaching
- 2011–2015: Chiba Jets (asst.)
- 2015–2016: Iwate Big Bulls
- 2016-2017: Hitachi SunRockers Tokyo-Shibuya (asst)
- 2017-2018: Sun Rockers Shibuya
- 2019-: Kawasaki Brave Thunders (asst)

Geoffrey Katsuhisa (勝久 ジェフリー, Katsuhisa Jefuri) is the assistant coach of the Kawasaki Brave Thunders in the Japanese B.League.

== Head coaching record ==
Legend
Regular season	G	Games coached	W	Games won	L	Games lost	W–L %	Win–loss %
Playoffs	PG	Playoff games	PW	Playoff wins	PL	Playoff losses	PW–L %	Playoff win–loss %

Team	Year	G	W	L	W–L%	Finish	PG	PW	PL	PW–L%	Result
Iwate Big Bulls	2015-16	52	30	22	.577	5th in Bj Eastern	4	2	2	.500	Lost in second round
Sun Rockers Shibuya	2017-18	60	28	32	.467	5th in Eastern	-	-	-	–	-
Sun Rockers Shibuya	2018-19	8	1	7	.125	Fired	-	-	-	–	-
