= Keijuro Matsui =

Japanese basketball player

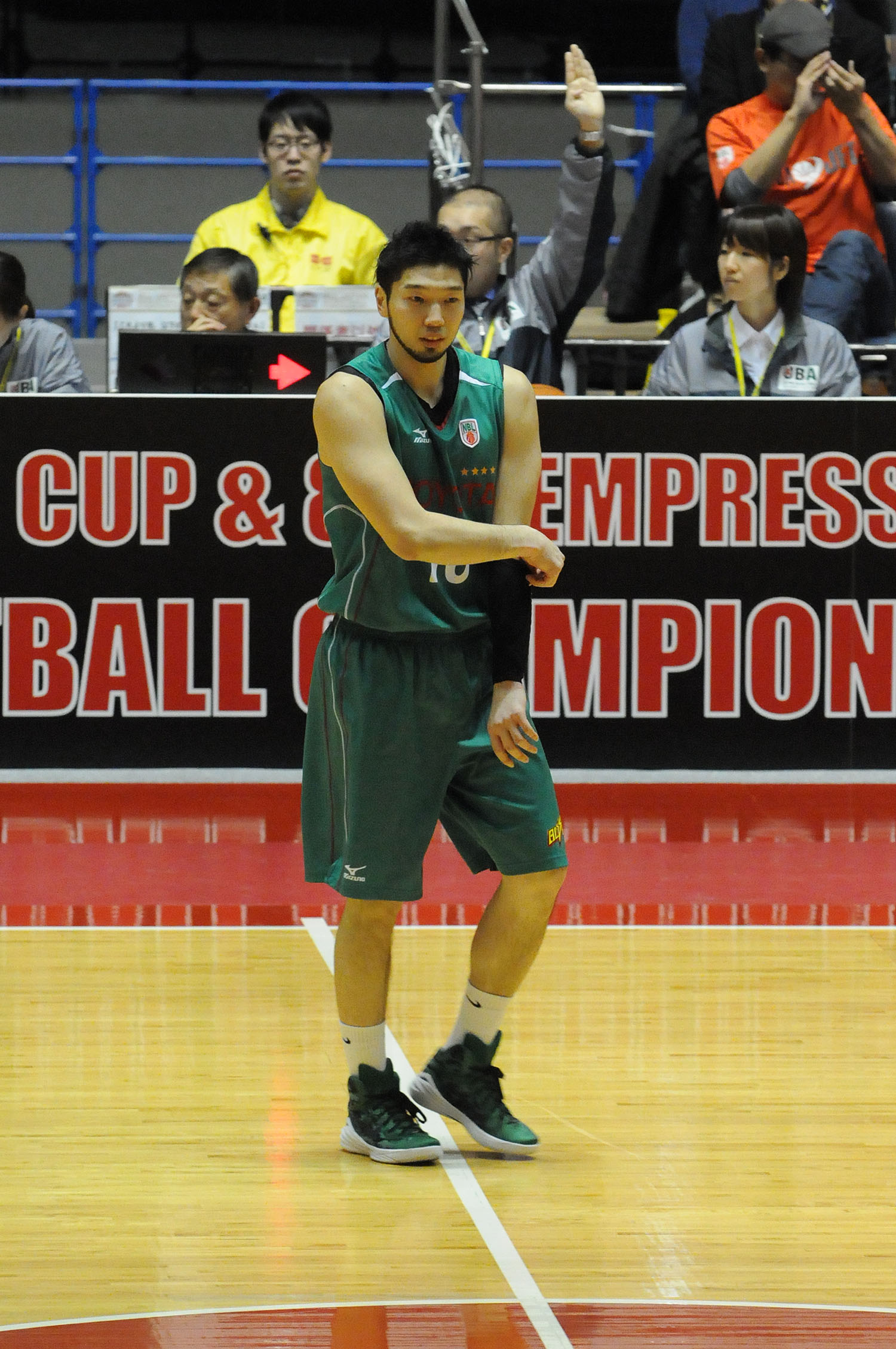

No. 16 – Kagawa Five Arrows
- Position: Guard
- League: B.League

Personal information
- Born: October 16, 1985 (age 41) Suginami, Tokyo, Japan
- Listed height: 6 ft 2 in (1.88 m)
- Listed weight: 183 lb (83 kg)

Career information
- High school: Montrose Christian School (Rockville, Maryland)
- College: Columbia (2005–2009)
- NBA draft: 2009: undrafted
- Playing career: 2009–present

Career history
- 2009–2010: Rera Kamuy Hokkaido
- 2010–2011: Hitachi SunRockers
- 2011–2017: Toyota Alvark
- 2017–2019: SeaHorses Mikawa
- 2019–2021: Kyoto Hannaryz
- 2021–2023: Toyama Grouses
- 2023–present: Kagawa Five Arrows

Keijuro Matsui (popularly known as KJ) (born October 16, 1985) is a Japanese professional basketball player for the Kagawa Five Arrows of the B.League. He is a former guard for the Columbia Lions basketball team at Columbia University and the first Japanese native basketball player in NCAA Division I history. Matsui also played in the 2005 Nike Hoop Summit for the World Select Team, only the second Japanese to do so. In the summit he scored seven points in 11 minutes. Following his collegiate career, he relocated to his native country, where he has played ever since.

== Career statistics ==
Legend
GP	Games played	GS	Games started	MPG	Minutes per game
FG%	Field goal percentage	3P%	3-point field goal percentage	FT%	Free throw percentage
RPG	Rebounds per game	APG	Assists per game	SPG	Steals per game
BPG	Blocks per game	PPG	Points per game	**Bold**	Career high

†	Denotes seasons in which Matsui won an championship
*	Led the league

Year	Team	GP	GS	MPG	FG%	3P%	FT%	RPG	APG	SPG	BPG	PPG
2009-10	Hokkaido	41		17.05	.413	.399	.757	1.78	0.44	0.27	0	6.76
2010-11	Hitachi	36		22.17	.417	.349	.800	1.58	0.81	0.28	0.05	8.42
2011-12†	Toyota	42		18.83	.449	.424	.813	1.76	0.55	0.36	0.07	8.69
2012-13	Toyota	42		18.7	.458	.494*	.814	2.2	0.8	0.2	0.1	9.6
2013-14	Toyota	54		21.6	.446	.408	.839	1.8	1.0	0.5	0.0	10.7
2014-15	Toyota	54	5	22.3	.406	.432	.676	2.3	1.3	0.6	0.0	9.4
2015-16	Toyota	55	13	20.8	.478	.449*	.816	1.4	1.4	0.6	0	11.2
2016-17	A Tokyo	59	6	16.8	.399	.395	.939	1.4	0.4	0.2	0.1	6.1
2017-18	Mikawa	55	6	12.8	.440	.403	.677	0.9	0.9	0.4	0.0	4.9
