= Tokyo Sunrockers =

Professional basketball team in Shibuya, Tokyo, Japan

- Leagues: B.League
- Founded: 1935; 91 years ago
- History: Hitachi Honsha Rising Sun; 1935–2000; Hitachi SunRockers; 2000–2013; Hitachi SunRockers Tokyo; 2013–2016; Hitachi SunRockers Tokyo Shibuya; 2016–2017; SunRockers Shibuya; 2017–2026; Tokyo SunRockers; 2026–present
- Arena: Aoyama Gakuin University Memorial Hall
- Capacity: 2,500
- Location: Shibuya, Tokyo
- Head coach: Shawn Dennis
- Retired numbers: 2 (11, 20)
- Website: Official site
Home	Away

The Tokyo Sunrockers are a Japanese professional basketball team based in Tokyo and acquired by Sega Sammy. The team competes in the B.League Premier, the highest division of the B.League, as a member of the Eastern Conference. Starting from the 2026–27 season, the team will play its home games at Toyota Arena Tokyo in Aomi, Kōtō Ward, which they share with Alvark Tokyo. Until 2000, the team was known as Hitachi Honsha Rising Sun.

== Current roster ==
Note: Flags indicate national team eligibility at FIBA-sanctioned events. Players may hold other non-FIBA nationalities not displayed.

Sun Rockers Shibuya roster
Players
Coaches

Pos.	No.	Nat.	Name	Ht.	Age
G	5	(Kazakhstan)	Anthony Clemmons	1.87 m (6 ft 2 in)	32 – 15 August 1994
F/C	8	(Japan)	Josh Hawkinson	2.08 m (6 ft 10 in)	31 – 23 June 1995
G	9	(Japan)	Leo Vendrame	1.83 m (6 ft 0 in)	32 – 14 November 1993
G	10	(Japan)	Genki Kojima	1.81 m (5 ft 11 in)	32 – 19 February 1994
G	13	(Japan)	Daiki Tanaka	1.93 m (6 ft 4 in)	35 – 3 September 1991
F/C	14	(United States)	James Michael McAdoo	2.06 m (6 ft 9 in)	33 – 4 January 1993
F	16	(Japan)	Aki Chambers	1.91 m (6 ft 3 in)	36 – 19 September 1990
G	28	(Japan)	Kazuma Tsuya	1.90 m (6 ft 3 in)	28 – 7 June 1998
F	34	(United States)	Ryan Kelly	2.11 m (6 ft 11 in)	35 – 9 April 1991
F/C	43	(Japan)	Yuya Nagayoshi	1.98 m (6 ft 6 in)	35 – 14 July 1991
G	44	(Japan)	Kaito Morizane	1.87 m (6 ft 2 in)	29 – 26 August 1997
F	92	(Japan)	Keisuke Murakoshi	1.95 m (6 ft 5 in)	32 – 16 March 1994

Head coach

- Ken Hamanaka

Assistant coach(es)

- Taishiro Shimizu

Legend

- (C) Team captain
- Injured

- Roster
Updated: February 10, 2023

== Notable players ==
To appear in this section a player must have either:

- Set a club record or won an individual award as a professional player.
- Played at least one official international match for his senior national team at any time.

- (Cameroon) Alfred Aboya
- (United States) David Benoit
- (Japan) Ira Brown
- (United States) Scott Burrell
- (United States) Stanley Burrell
- (United States) Mo Charlo
- (United States) Peter Cornell
- (United States) Brian Evans
- (United States) Darren Fenn
- (United States) R. T. Guinn
- (Japan) Keishi Handa
- (United States) Juaquin Hawkins
- (United States) Josh Heytvelt
- (Japan) Kei Igarashi
- (Trinidad and Tobago) Kadeem Jack
- (Qatar) Trey Johnson
- (Japan) Shinsuke Kashiwagi
- (United States) Jonathan Kerner
- (United States) Jai Lewis
- (Sweden) Christian Maråker
- (Japan) Keijuro Matsui
- (United States) Kevin Murphy
- (Japan) Yuki Mitsuhara
- (Japan) Yuto Otsuka
- (Canada) Chad Posthumus
- (Canada) Robert Sacre
- (United States) Jamar Smith
- (Japan) Joji Takeuchi
- (United States) Darius Rice
- (United States) Lamar Rice
- (United States) Darryl Webb

=== Hitachi Osaka players ===
- (United States) Derek Grimm
- (United States) Ricky Santos
- (Japan) Haruyuki Ishibashi

== Coaches ==
- (United States) Bob Pierce (1997–2001)
- (Japan) Osamu Kuraishi
- (Japan) Shuji Ono (2005–2013)
- (United States) Tim Lewis (2013–14)
- (United States) Michael Olson (2014–16)
- (Canada) BT Toews (2016–17)
- (Japan) Geoffrey Katsuhisa (2017-)
- (United States) Kyle Bailey (asst)

== Arenas ==
- Aoyama Gakuin University
- Sumida City Gymnasium

== Practice facilities ==
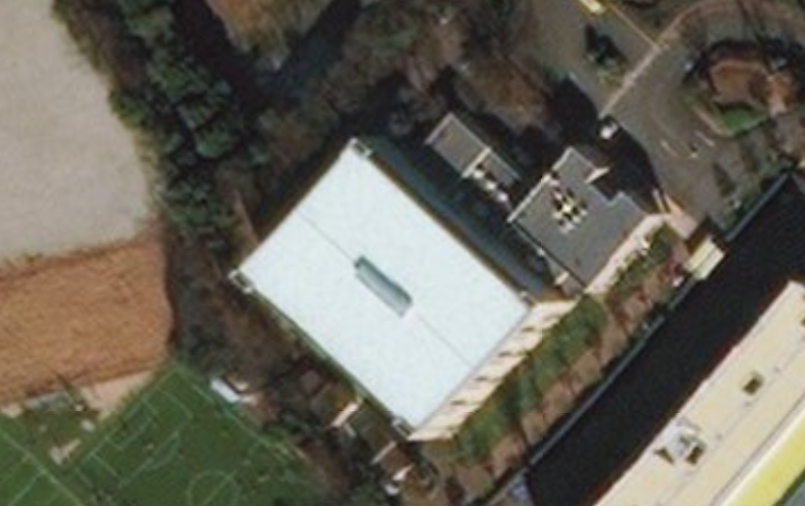
Hitachi Kashiwa Gymnasium

They practice at the Hitachi Kashiwa Gymnasium in Hitachidai, Kashiwa, Chiba.
