= 2016 FIBA Asia Challenge squads =

The following are the squads of the 12 teams that will participate at the 2016 FIBA Asia Challenge.

== Group A ==
=== China ===
China men's national basketball team - 2016 FIBA Asia Challenge roster
Players
Coaches

Pos.	No.	Name	Age – Date of birth	Height	Club	Ctr.
SG	5	Cui Jinming	24 – July 11, 1992	1.93 m (6 ft 4 in)	Jilin Northeast Tigers	(China)
F	6	He Tianju	25 – December 28, 1990	2.06 m (6 ft 9 in)	Liaoning Flying Leopards	(China)
PG	7	Fang Shuo	26 – September 7, 1990	1.88 m (6 ft 2 in)	Beijing Ducks	(China)
SG	9	Yuan Shuai	22 – July 18, 1994	1.90 m (6 ft 3 in)	Shanxi Zhongyu Brave Dragons	(China)
SF	11	Liu Zhixuan	25 – January 7, 1991	1.93 m (6 ft 4 in)	Liaoning Flying Leopards	(China)
PF	14	Zou Yuchen	20 – July 5, 1996	2.08 m (6 ft 10 in)	Bayi Rockets	(China)
C	15	Fan Ziming	18 – April 29, 1998	2.11 m (6 ft 11 in)	Foshan Long-Lions	(China)
SF	20	Zhan Yanhao	18 – October 25, 1997	1.95 m (6 ft 5 in)	Zhejiang Guangsha Lions	(China)
C	21	Hu Jinqiu	18 – September 24, 1997	2.08 m (6 ft 10 in)	Zhejiang Guangsha Lions	(China)
PF	22	Tao Hanlin	25 – June 4, 1991	2.08 m (6 ft 10 in)	Shandong Golden Stars	(China)
G	23	Zhao Dapeng	26 – August 7, 1990	1.95 m (6 ft 5 in)	Zhejiang Guangsha Lions	(China)
PG	33	Wu Qian	22 – July 7, 1994	1.90 m (6 ft 3 in)	Zhejiang Golden Bulls	(China)

Head coach

- (China) Li Nan

Assistant coach(es)

- (China) Fan Bin

Legend

- (C) Team captain
- (NP) Naturalized Player
- Club – describes last
  club before the tournament
- Age – describes age
  on September 9, 2016

=== Kazakhstan ===
Kazakhstan men's national basketball team - 2016 FIBA Asia Challenge roster
Players
Coaches

Pos.	No.	Name	Age – Date of birth	Height	Club	Ctr.
G	4	Pavel Ilin	24 – 24 May 1992	1.94 m (6 ft 4 in)	BC Astana	(Kazakhstan)
G	5	Shaim Kuanov	25 – 28 July 1991	1.81 m (5 ft 11 in)	BK Tobol Kostanay	(Kazakhstan)
G	6	Ibragim Konyssov	20 – 28 March 1996	1.84 m (6 ft 0 in)	BK Barsy Atyrau	(Kazakhstan)
F	7	Nikolay Bazhkin	25 – 9 December 1990	1.97 m (6 ft 6 in)	Tigers Astana	(Kazakhstan)
G	10	Vassiliy Savchenko	29 – 13 June 1987	1.89 m (6 ft 2 in)	Barsy Atyrau	(Kazakhstan)
C	14	Vitaliy Lapchenko	24 – 27 August 1992	2.06 m (6 ft 9 in)	BC Astana	(Kazakhstan)
F	15	Pavel Micheev	33 – 30 May 1983	2.00 m (6 ft 7 in)	Krasnye Krylia	(Russia)
C	22	Askar Maidekin	19 – 28 May 1997	2.05 m (6 ft 9 in)		(Kazakhstan)
G	23	Kadyrzhan Gubashev	26 – 31 January 1990	1.80 m (5 ft 11 in)	Barsy Atyrau	(Kazakhstan)
F	33	Rustam Utegen	20 – 14 February 1996	1.91 m (6 ft 3 in)	Barsy Atyrau	(Kazakhstan)
C	37	Mikhail Yevstigneyev	32 – 5 July 1984	2.00 m (6 ft 7 in)	Barsy Atyrau	(Kazakhstan)
F	45	Yuriy Kozhanov	26 – 5 January 1990	1.90 m (6 ft 3 in)	Almaty Legion	(Kazakhstan)

Head coach

- (Ukraine) Eduard Skrypets

Legend

- Club – describes last
  club before the tournament
- Age – describes age
  on 9 September 2016

== Group B ==
=== Philippines ===
Philippines men's national basketball team - 2016 FIBA Asia Challenge roster
Players
Coaches

Pos.	No.	Name	Age – Date of birth	Height	Club	Ctr.
C	7	Arnold Van Opstal	24 – December 15, 1991	2.06 m (6 ft 9 in)	Free agent
F/C	8	Russel Escoto	23 – December 4, 1992	1.98 m (6 ft 6 in)	Phoenix Petroleum Accelerators	(Philippines)
G	9	Ed Daquioag	25 – August 18, 1991	1.78 m (5 ft 10 in)	Phoenix Petroleum Accelerators	(Philippines)
F/C	11	Chris Javier	23 – December 6, 1992	1.93 m (6 ft 4 in)	UE Red Warriors	(Philippines)
F	12	Mac Belo	23 – February 12, 1993	1.91 m (6 ft 3 in)	Phoenix Petroleum Accelerators	(Philippines)
G	13	Mike Tolomia	23 – January 6, 1993	1.83 m (6 ft 0 in)	Phoenix Petroleum Accelerators	(Philippines)
F	14	Kevin Ferrer	23 – March 26, 1993	1.96 m (6 ft 5 in)	Mighty Sports	(Philippines)
G/F	16	Roger Pogoy	24 – June 16, 1992	1.88 m (6 ft 2 in)	FEU Tamaraws	(Philippines)
G/F	17	CJ Perez	22 – November 17, 1993	1.88 m (6 ft 2 in)	Lyceum Pirates	(Philippines)
F	18	Carl Bryan Cruz	25 – August 21, 1991	1.93 m (6 ft 4 in)	FEU Tamaraws	(Philippines)
G/F	19	Von Pessumal	23 – February 12, 1993	1.88 m (6 ft 2 in)	Tanduay Light Rhum Masters	(Philippines)
F/C	21	Alfonzo Gotladera	24 – February 16, 1992	1.98 m (6 ft 6 in)	Ateneo Blue Eagles	(Philippines)

Head coach

- (Philippines) Josh Reyes

Assistant coach(es)

- (Philippines) Mike Oliver

Team manager

- (Philippines) Butch Antonio

Legend

- (C) Team captain
- Club – describes last
  club before the tournament
- Age – describes age
  on September 9, 2016

=== India ===
India men's national basketball team roster
Players
Coaches

Pos.	No.	Name	Age – Date of birth	Height	Club
F	4	Arshpreet Singh Bhullar	19 – October 2, 1996	1.90 m (6 ft 3 in)	Ludhiana Basketball Academy	(India)
F	9	Vishesh Bhriguvanshi	24 – September 13, 1991	1.95 m (6 ft 5 in)	ONGC	(India)
C	10	Amritpal Singh (C)	25 – January 5, 1991	2.07 m (6 ft 9 in)	ONGC	(India)
F	12	Basil Philip	25 – January 10, 1991	1.84 m (6 ft 0 in)	Central Excise & Customs	(India)
PF	14	Yadwinder Singh	29 – December 30, 1986	1.98 m (6 ft 6 in)	ONGC	(India)
C	15	Rikin Shantilal Pethani	25 – December 2, 1990	2.03 m (6 ft 8 in)	Income Tax (basketball)	(India)
C	22	Ravi Bhardwaj	23 – October 31, 1992	2.07 m (6 ft 9 in)
SG	25	Hariram Ragupathy	18 – April 25, 1998	1.84 m (6 ft 0 in)	Loyola College, Chennai	(India)
PF	27	Amjyot Singh	24 – January 27, 1992	2.03 m (6 ft 8 in)	Agleymina Hamamatsu	(Japan)
F	46	Prasanna Venkatesh Sivakumar	23 – September 25, 1992	1.86 m (6 ft 1 in)	Indian Overseas Bank (basketball)	(India)
PG	66	Akilan Pari	27 – July 20, 1989	1.80 m (5 ft 11 in)	Income Tax (basketball)	(India)
PG	99	Talwinderjit Singh	29 – October 20, 1986	1.82 m (6 ft 0 in)

Head coach

- (India) Sat Prakash Yadav

Assistant coach(es)

- (India) Sunny Cheruthottil Varghese

Legend

- (C) Team captain
- Club – describes last
  club before the tournament
- Age – describes age
  on September 9, 2016

== Group C ==
=== Iran ===
Iran men's national basketball team - 2016 FIBA Asia Challenge roster
Players
Coaches

Pos.	No.	Name	Age – Date of birth	Height	Club	Ctr.
SF	4	Adnan Doraghi	27 – June 19, 1989	1.90 m (6 ft 3 in)	Shahrdari Gorgan	(Iran)
PG	5	Sajjad Mashayekhi	22 – February 23, 1994	1.80 m (5 ft 11 in)	Chemidor Tehran	(Iran)
PG	6	Farid Aslani	28 – July 4, 1988	1.83 m (6 ft 0 in)	Chemidor Tehran	(Iran)
SF	7	Mohammad Hassanzadeh	25 – October 6, 1990	2.03 m (6 ft 8 in)	Sanat Naft Abadan	(Iran)
PG	8	Behnam Yakhchali	26 – July 12, 1990	1.95 m (6 ft 5 in)	Petrochimi Bandar Imam	(Iran)
PG	9	Vahid Dalirzahan	21 – March 28, 1995	1.98 m (6 ft 6 in)	Niroo Zamini	(Iran)
SG	10	Ali Allahverdi	19 – November 14, 1996	1.98 m (6 ft 6 in)	Chemidor Tehran	(Iran)
PF	11	Oshin Sahakian	30 – March 21, 1986	2.00 m (6 ft 7 in)	Chemidor Tehran	(Iran)
C	12	Rouzbeh Arghavan	28 – May 18, 1988	2.14 m (7 ft 0 in)	Azad University	(Iran)
SF	13	Mohammad Jamshidi	25 – July 30, 1991	1.99 m (6 ft 6 in)	Sanat Naft Abadan	(Iran)
F	14	Arsalan Kazemi	26 – April 22, 1990	1.99 m (6 ft 6 in)	Niroo Zamini	(Iran)
C	15	Hamed Haddadi	31 – May 19, 1985	2.18 m (7 ft 2 in)	Petrochimi Bandar Imam	(Iran)

Legend

- (C) Team captain
- (NP) Naturalized Player
- Club – describes last
  club before the tournament
- Age – describes age
  on September 9, 2016

=== Qatar ===
Qatar men's national basketball team - 2016 FIBA Asia Challenge roster
Players
Coaches

Pos.	No.	Name	Age – Date of birth	Height	Club
G	4	Abdulrahman Mohamed Saad	20 – July 2, 1996	1.88 m (6 ft 2 in)	Al Gharafa Doha	(Qatar)
SG	5	Malek Saleem Abdullah	31 – May 13, 1985	1.93 m (6 ft 4 in)	Al Rayyan Doha	(Qatar)
G	6	Boney Harold Watson	38 – March 26, 1978	1.80 m (5 ft 11 in)	Al-Wakrah Sport Club (basketball)	(Qatar)
SG	7	Abdulrahman Ibrahim Al-Muftah	21 – October 30, 1994	1.81 m (5 ft 11 in)	Qatar SC	(Qatar)
F	8	Yassin Mahdi Taha	24 – January 1, 1992	2.01 m (6 ft 7 in)	Qatar SC	(Qatar)
SG	9	Mohamed Hasaan A Mohamed	25 – August 3, 1991	1.95 m (6 ft 5 in)	Al Rayyan Doha	(Qatar)
F	10	Abduallah Shaher Matalkeh	25 – March 8, 1991	2.01 m (6 ft 7 in)	Al Rayyan Doha	(Qatar)
F	11	Erfan Ali	32 – December 20, 1983	2.01 m (6 ft 7 in)	Al Sadd Basketball Team	(Qatar)
C	12	Abdelrahman Yehia Abdelhaleem	20 – June 26, 1996	2.00 m (6 ft 7 in)	Al Rayyan Doha	(Qatar)
C	13	Mohd Yousuf Mohamed	34 – September 9, 1982	2.05 m (6 ft 9 in)	El Jaish SC (basketball)	(Qatar)
C	14	Khalid Abdalla Adam	23 – February 27, 1993	2.05 m (6 ft 9 in)	Al-Shamal Sports Club	(Qatar)
G	15	Mohamed Abdelaziz Abdelkawy	20 – November 23, 1995	1.79 m (5 ft 10 in)	Al Rayyan Doha	(Qatar)

Head coach

- (Greece) Vassilis Fragkias

Assistant coach(es)

- (Greece) Georgios Bitzanis

Legend

- (C) Team captain
- Club – describes last
  club before the tournament
- Age – describes age
  on September 9, 2016

=== Iraq ===
Iraq men's national basketball team - 2016 FIBA Asia Challenge roster
Players
Coaches

Pos.	No.	Name	Age – Date of birth	Height	Club	Ctr.
F	4	Ahmed Al-Tameemi	32 – 13 March 1984	2.00 m (6 ft 7 in)	Duhok SC	(Iraq)
F	5	Dhulfiqar Al-Hchaimi	25 – 24 May 1991	1.93 m (6 ft 4 in)	Al-Mina'a (basketball club)	(Iraq)
PG	6	Ali Aljuboori	29 – 9 April 1987	1.65 m (5 ft 5 in)	Al-Mina'a (basketball club)	(Iraq)
F	7	Ali Ismael	27 – 13 August 1989	1.95 m (6 ft 5 in)	Al-Shorta SC (basketball)	(Iraq)
G	8	Omar Alazawi	28 – 12 May 1988	1.88 m (6 ft 2 in)	Naft Al-Janoob South Oil Basketball Club	(Iraq)
F	9	Kevin Galloway	28 – 23 May 1988	2.00 m (6 ft 7 in)	Homenetmen Beirut B.C.	(Lebanon)
SF	10	Ali Hamad	30 – 27 May 1986	1.93 m (6 ft 4 in)	Naft Al-Janoob South Oil Basketball Club	(Iraq)
SF	12	Hussein Talib	26 – 1 June 1990	1.98 m (6 ft 6 in)
C	13	Ali Hameed	32 – 26 April 1984	2.09 m (6 ft 10 in)	Al-Mina'a (basketball club)	(Iraq)
C	14	Ihab Al-Zuhairi	18 – 24 April 1998	2.07 m (6 ft 9 in)
C	15	Mohammed Al-Khafaji	25 – 9 July 1991	2.06 m (6 ft 9 in)	Al-Shorta SC (basketball)	(Iraq)
SG	30	Hassan Abdullah	24 – 4 February 1992	1.88 m (6 ft 2 in)	Al-Kahraba (men's basketball)	(Iraq)

Head coach

- (Serbia) Srdjan Antic

Legend

- Club – describes last
  club before the tournament
- Age – describes age
  on 9 September 2016

== Group D ==
=== Japan ===
Japan men's national basketball team - 2016 FIBA Asia Challenge roster
Players
Coaches

Pos.	No.	Name	Age – Date of birth	Height	Club	Ctr.
PG	3	Naoto Tsuji	27 – 8 September 1989	1.85 m (6 ft 1 in)	Kawasaki Brave Thunders	(Japan)
PF	5	Yuki Mitsuhara	26 – 12 December 1989	1.98 m (6 ft 6 in)	Sunrockers Shibuya	(Japan)
PG	6	Makoto Hiejima	26 – 11 August 1990	1.90 m (6 ft 3 in)	Seahorses Mikawa	(Japan)
PG	7	Ryusei Shinoyama	28 – 20 July 1988	1.78 m (5 ft 10 in)	Kawasaki Brave Thunders	(Japan)
C	8	Atsuya Ota	32 – 4 June 1984	2.06 m (6 ft 9 in)	San en Neophoneix	(Japan)
PG	11	Ryoma Hashimoto	28 – 11 May 1988	1.78 m (5 ft 10 in)	Seahorses Mikawa	(Japan)
SF	20	Takanobu Nishikawa	24 – 14 January 1992	1.96 m (6 ft 5 in)	Levanga Hokkiado	(Japan)
PG	22	Yuma Fujii	24 – 23 December 1991	1.78 m (5 ft 10 in)	Kawasaki Brave Thunders	(Japan)
SG	25	Takatoshi Furukawa	28 – 20 October 1987	1.90 m (6 ft 3 in)	Tochigi Brex	(Japan)
PF	35	Ira Brown	34 – 3 August 1982	1.93 m (6 ft 4 in)	Sunrockers Shibuya	(Japan)
PF	43	Yuya Nagayoshi	25 – 14 July 1991	1.98 m (6 ft 6 in)	Kawasaki Brave Thunders	(Japan)
SF	88	Tenketsu Harimoto	24 – 8 January 1992	1.97 m (6 ft 6 in)	Nagoya Diamond Dolphins	(Japan)

Head coach

- (Japan) Kenji Hasegawa

Assistant coach(es)

- (Japan) Kenji Sato

Legend

- Club – describes last
  club before the tournament
- Age – describes age
  on 9 September 2016

=== South Korea ===
Korea men's national basketball team - 2016 FIBA Asia Challenge roster
Players
Coaches

Pos.	No.	Name	Age – Date of birth	Height	Club	Ctr.
G	1	Kim Si-rae	27 – March 22, 1989	1.78 m (5 ft 10 in)	Korea Armed Forces Athletic Corps	(South Korea)
F	3	Lee Jung-hyun	29 – March 3, 1987	1.91 m (6 ft 3 in)	Anyang KGC	(South Korea)
G	5	Kim Sun-hyung	28 – July 1, 1988	1.87 m (6 ft 2 in)	Seoul SK Knights	(South Korea)
G	6	Heo Hoon	21 – August 16, 1995	1.80 m (5 ft 11 in)	Yonsei University	(South Korea)
G	9	Heo Ung	23 – August 5, 1993	1.86 m (6 ft 1 in)	Wonju Dongbu Promy	(South Korea)
F	10	Cho Sung-min	32 – December 23, 1983	1.89 m (6 ft 2 in)	Busan KT Sonicboom	(South Korea)
F	11	Heo Il-young	31 – August 5, 1985	1.95 m (6 ft 5 in)	Goyang Orion Orions	(South Korea)
F	12	Jeong Hyo-geun	22 – December 14, 1993	2.01 m (6 ft 7 in)	Incheon ET Land Elephants	(South Korea)
C	14	Choi Bu-kyung	27 – June 28, 1989	2.00 m (6 ft 7 in)	Korea Armed Forces Athletic Corps	(South Korea)
C	15	Kim Jong-kyu	25 – July 3, 1991	2.07 m (6 ft 9 in)	Changwon LG Sakers	(South Korea)
C	31	Jang Jae-sok	25 – February 3, 1991	2.04 m (6 ft 8 in)	Goyang Orion Orions	(South Korea)
F	33	Lee Seung-hyun	24 – April 16, 1992	1.97 m (6 ft 6 in)	Goyang Orion Orions	(South Korea)

Head coach

- (South Korea) Hur Jae

Assistant coach(es)

- (South Korea) Kim Sang-sik

Legend

- (C) Team captain
- (NP) Naturalized Player
- Club – describes last
  club before the tournament
- Age – describes age
  on September 9, 2016
