= 2019 FIBA Basketball World Cup qualification (Asia) =

2019 FIBA Basketball World Cup
Asian Qualification

Tournament details
- Dates: 23 November 2017 – 24 February 2019
- Teams: 16 (from 2 confederations)

Official website
- Asian qualifiers website

The 2019 FIBA Basketball World Cup qualification for the FIBA Asia-Oceania region began in November 2017 and concluded in February 2019. The process determined the seven teams that would join the automatically qualified hosts China at the 2019 FIBA Basketball World Cup.

== Seeding ==
The 16 participating teams at the 2017 FIBA Asia Cup did participate in the first round of the FIBA Basketball World Cup Asian qualifiers. China, the host of the 2019 FIBA Basketball World Cup, also participated in the qualifiers despite being automatically qualified for the FIBA Basketball World Cup as hosts. The seeding of eight pots used in the draw were determined on the basis of the team's FIBA World Rankings and "geographic principles". Teams in pots with an odd number were either drawn on Group A or B while teams in pots with an even number were drawn on Group C or D.

Pot 1	Pot 2	Pot 3	Pot 4	Pot 5	Pot 6	Pot 7	Pot 8
Australia; New Zealand	Iran; Jordan	China; Philippines*	Lebanon; Qatar	South Korea*; Japan*	India*; Kazakhstan*	Chinese Taipei*; Hong Kong*	Iraq; Syria

- (*) At the time of the draw, teams which hasn't secured qualification for the 2017 FIBA Asia Cup. Discounting FIBA Basketball World Cup hosts China, four teams from the East Asia region, a team each for Central Asia, Southeast Asia, and South Asia have not qualified yet at that time for the FIBA Asia Cup and thus placeholder teams selected on the basis of FIBA World Rankings were used for the draw. Should these teams have not qualify for the continental tournament, the qualifying teams could have replaced them. All of the placeholder teams later secured qualification.

== First round ==
All times are local.

=== Group A ===
Pos	Team	Pld	W	L	PF	PA	PD	Pts	Qualification
1	New Zealand	6	5	1	579	439	+140	11	Second round
2	South Korea	6	4	2	530	502	+28	10	Second round
3	China	6	3	3	503	414	+89	9	Second round
4	Hong Kong	6	0	6	404	661	−257	6	

Source: FIBA
Rules for classification: 1) Points; 2) Head-to-head results; 3) Points difference; 4) Points scored.

23 November 2017	New Zealand	80–86	South Korea	Wellington
19:10	Scoring by quarter: 18–17, 21–24, 20–19, 21–26
	Pts: C. Webster 16; Rebs: Pledger, Vukona 8 Asts: T. Webster 5	Boxscore	Pts: Jeon 22; Rebs: Oh 10; Asts: Choi 7	Arena: TSB Bank Arena; Attendance: 2,826; Referees: Ferdinand Pascual (PHI), Chung Yi-chih (TPE), Yu Jung (TPE)

23 November 2017	China	96–44	Hong Kong	Nanjing
19:30	Scoring by quarter: 32–16, 21–6, 20–11, 23–11
	Pts: Mugedaer 17; Rebs: Wang Zh. 11; Asts: Wang Zi. 5	Boxscore	Pts: Liang 14; Rebs: Reid 8 Asts: Reid 4	Arena: Gymnasium of Youth Olympic Games Sport Park; Attendance: 14,000; Referees: Scott Beker (AUS), Joenard Garcia (PHI), Michael Aylen (AUS)

26 November 2017	South Korea	81–92	China	Goyang
19:00	Scoring by quarter: 28–26, 12–18, 18–27, 23–21
	Pts: Heo H. 16; Rebs: Lee S. 5 Asts: Heo H. 4	Boxscore	Pts: Ding 30; Rebs: Wang Zh. 11; Asts: Liu, Sun 4	Arena: Goyang Gymnasium; Attendance: 4,376; Referees: Vaughan Mayberry (AUS), Takaki Kato (JPN), Christopher Reid (AUS)

26 November 2017	Hong Kong	74–133	New Zealand	Hong Kong
20:00	Scoring by quarter: 22–36, 18–35, 17–35, 17–27
	Pts: Reid 17; Rebs: Reid 8 Asts: Lee 4	Boxscore	Pts: Ngatai 18; Rebs: Loe, Te Rangi 6 Asts: T. Webster 9	Arena: Southorn Stadium; Attendance: 1,161; Referees: Yuji Hirahara (JPN), Ricor Buaron (PHI), Yuji Higashi (JPN)

23 February 2018	South Korea	93–72	Hong Kong	Seoul
19:30	Scoring by quarter: 25–20, 25–14, 29–25, 14–13
	Pts: Lee J.H. 20; Rebs: Ratliffe 9 Asts: Park 5	Boxscore	Pts: Lee Ka. 23; Rebs: Reid 13; Asts: Chan, Reid 3	Arena: Jamsil Arena; Attendance: 2,847; Referees: Matthew Beattie (AUS), Yu Jung (TPE), James Boyer (AUS)

23 February 2018	China	73–82	New Zealand	Dongguan
19:30	Scoring by quarter: 14–14, 24–23, 20–18, 15–27
	Pts: Yi 37; Rebs: Guo, Yi 6 Asts: Guo 5	Boxscore	Pts: C. Webster, T. Webster 18; Rebs: Pledger 6 Asts: C. Webster, T. Webster 5	Arena: Nissan Sports Centre; Attendance: 8,200; Referees: Ferdinand Pascual (PHI), Chen Ying-cheng (TPE), Alexey Stepanenko (KAZ)

26 February 2018	South Korea	84–93	New Zealand	Seoul
19:30	Scoring by quarter: 24–21, 24–28, 13–23, 23–21
	Pts: Ratliffe 29; Rebs: Ratliffe 11; Asts: Lee J.H. 6	Boxscore	Pts: C. Webster 30; Rebs: I. Fotu 11; Asts: C. Webster 6	Arena: Jamsil Arena; Attendance: 4,770; Referees: Glenn Cornelio (PHI), Takaki Kato (JPN), Yu Jung (TPE)

26 February 2018	Hong Kong	58–111	China	Hong Kong
20:00	Scoring by quarter: 15–33, 24–28, 13–23, 14–23
	Pts: Reid 16; Rebs: Reid 8 Asts: Chan 4	Boxscore	Pts: Guo 15; Rebs: three players 6 Asts: Guo, Wu 6	Arena: Southorn Stadium; Attendance: 1,500; Referees: James Boyer (AUS), Matthew Beattie (AUS), Yuji Higashi (JPN)

28 June 2018	New Zealand	124–65	Hong Kong	Rotorua
19:10	Scoring by quarter: 32–17, 31–18, 30–15, 31–15
	Pts: Abercrombie, Loe 18; Rebs: three players 7 Asts: Ili 10	Boxscore	Pts: Fong, Tsai 17; Rebs: Cheng, Fong 3 Asts: Xu 7	Arena: Energy Events Centre; Attendance: 2,500; Referees: Yuji Higashi (JPN), Joenard Garcia (PHI), Reynaldo Yante (PHI)

28 June 2018	China	74–82	South Korea	Shenzhen
19:30	Scoring by quarter: 13–21, 26–21, 10–24, 25–16
	Pts: Abudurexiti 15; Rebs: Abudurexiti 10; Asts: Liu 6	Boxscore	Pts: Ratliffe 25; Rebs: Ratliffe 11; Asts: Lee J.H. 5	Arena: Shenzhen Universiade Center; Attendance: 8,343; Referees: Chris Reid (AUS), Michael Aylen (AUS), Yuji Hirahara (JPN)

1 July 2018	New Zealand	67–57	China	Auckland
15:10	Scoring by quarter: 15–18, 22–11, 14–19, 16–9
	Pts: Fotu 15; Rebs: Loe 10; Asts: Ili 6	Boxscore	Pts: Abudurexiti 23; Rebs: Abudurexiti 12; Asts: Zhao J. 4	Arena: Spark Arena; Attendance: 8,431; Referees: Harja Jaladri (INA), Ricor Buaron (PHI), Yevgeniy Mikheyev (KAZ)

1 July 2018	Hong Kong	91–104	South Korea	Hong Kong
20:00	Scoring by quarter: 21–30, 24–24, 26–24, 20–26
	Pts: Lee 28; Rebs: Li 8 Asts: Li 5	Boxscore	Pts: Ratliffe 43; Rebs: Ratliffe 18; Asts: Lee J.H., Ratliffe 5	Arena: Southorn Stadium; Attendance: 1,851; Referees: Michael Aylen (AUS), Mohammad Doost (IRN), Christopher Reid (AUS)

=== Group B ===
Pos	Team	Pld	W	L	PF	PA	PD	Pts	Qualification
1	Australia	6	5	1	525	392	+133	11	Second round
2	Philippines	6	4	2	470	482	−12	10	Second round
3	Japan	6	2	4	469	464	+5	8	Second round
4	Chinese Taipei	6	1	5	426	552	−126	7	

Source: FIBA
Rules for classification: 1) Points; 2) Head-to-head results; 3) Points difference; 4) Points scored.

24 November 2017	Japan	71–77	Philippines	Tokyo
19:00	Scoring by quarter: 10–18, 18–19, 27–22, 16–18
	Pts: Hiejima 20; Rebs: Brown 15; Asts: Hiejima 5	Boxscore	Pts: William 20; Rebs: Blatche 12; Asts: William 6	Arena: Komazawa Gymnasium; Attendance: 3,482; Referees: Budi Marfan (INA), Nicolas Fernandes (TAH), Ryan Jones (NZL)

24 November 2017	Chinese Taipei	66–104	Australia	Taipei
19:00	Scoring by quarter: 13–27, 13–18, 20–26, 20–33
	Pts: Davis 17; Rebs: Davis 5 Asts: Chiang, Y. Chou 4	Boxscore	Pts: Cadee 16; Rebs: Creek 6 Asts: four players 4	Arena: Taipei Heping Basketball Gymnasium; Attendance: 5,000; Referees: Hwang In-tae (KOR), Harja Jaladri (INA), Haryanto Sutaryo (INA)

27 November 2017	Australia	82–58	Japan	Adelaide
19:00	Scoring by quarter: 23–22, 20–9, 17–19, 22–8
	Pts: Kickert 22; Rebs: Kay 10; Asts: Cadee 8	Boxscore	Pts: Hiejima 17; Rebs: Brown 8 Asts: Shinoyama, Takeuchi 2	Arena: Titanium Arena; Attendance: 4,200; Referees: Yuen Chun Yip (HKG), Wang Mei (CHN), Kim Jong-kuk (KOR)

27 November 2017	Philippines	90–83	Chinese Taipei	Quezon City
19:30	Scoring by quarter: 18–23, 26–19, 21–22, 25–19
	Pts: William 20; Rebs: Blatche 14; Asts: Ravena 5	Boxscore	Pts: Davis 20; Rebs: Davis 9 Asts: Chiang 6	Arena: Smart Araneta Coliseum; Attendance: 11,444; Referees: Ryan Jones (NZL), Ye Nan (CHN), Nicolas Fernandes (TAH)

22 February 2018	Australia	84–68	Philippines	Melbourne
19:30	Scoring by quarter: 19–19, 18–13, 26–17, 21–19
	Pts: Gliddon 16; Rebs: Creek 11; Asts: Cadee 5	Boxscore	Pts: Fajardo 15; Rebs: Blatche 7 Asts: Aguilar, Ravena 2	Arena: Margaret Court Arena; Attendance: 6,504; Referees: Ye Nan (CHN), Hwang In-tae (KOR), Chan Owe Shiong (MAS)

22 February 2018	Japan	69–70	Chinese Taipei	Yokohama
19:30	Scoring by quarter: 11–17, 24–12, 14–22, 20–19
	Pts: Tsuji 26; Rebs: Brown 8 Asts: Uto 5	Boxscore	Pts: Chen Y.C., Hu L.M. 15; Rebs: Davis 11; Asts: Davis 6	Arena: Yokohama International Swimming Pool; Attendance: 4,990; Referees: Harja Jaladri (INA), Ryan Jones (NZL), Nicolas Fernandes (TAH)

25 February 2018	Australia	88–68	Chinese Taipei	Melbourne
15:00	Scoring by quarter: 26–15, 21–10, 21–24, 20–19
	Pts: Creek 18; Rebs: Brandt, Creek 9 Asts: Cadee 6	Boxscore	Pts: Chen 22; Rebs: Davis 11; Asts: Chou Y., Davis 4	Arena: Margaret Court Arena; Attendance: 4,209; Referees: Hwang In-tae (KOR), Owe Shiong Chan (MAS), Ye Nan (CHN)

25 February 2018	Philippines	89–84	Japan	Pasay
19:30	Scoring by quarter: 21–22, 25–19, 26–20, 17–23
	Pts: Blatche 18; Rebs: Blatche 16; Asts: Ravena 5	Boxscore	Pts: Hiejima 23; Rebs: Brown 8 Asts: Shinoyama 4	Arena: Mall of Asia Arena; Attendance: 10,422; Referees: Nicolas Fernandes (TAH), Duan Zhu (CHN), Ryan Jones (NZL)

29 June 2018	Japan	79–78	Australia	Chiba
19:40	Scoring by quarter: 23–16, 19–17, 22–25, 15–20
	Pts: Fazekas 25; Rebs: Fazekas 12; Asts: Hiejima 6	Boxscore	Pts: Goulding 22; Rebs: Maker 12; Asts: Dellavedova 8	Arena: Chiba Port Arena; Attendance: 6,000; Referees: Marwan Egho (LBN), Ceciline Vincent (IND), Imran Baig (IND)

29 June 2018	Chinese Taipei	71–93	Philippines	Taipei
19:00	Scoring by quarter: 19–16, 18–28, 23–24, 11–25
	Pts: Davis 17; Rebs: Davis 7 Asts: Tseng, Yang 4	Boxscore	Pts: Fajardo 22; Rebs: Blatche 12; Asts: Romeo 6	Arena: Taipei Heping Basketball Gymnasium; Attendance: 7,000; Referees: Rabah Noujaim (LBN), Budi Marfan (INA), Preeda Muongmee (THA)

2 July 2018	Chinese Taipei	68–108	Japan	Taipei
19:00	Scoring by quarter: 15–27, 13–20, 29–30, 11–31
	Pts: Peng 19; Rebs: Davis 8 Asts: Tseng 3	Boxscore	Pts: Fazekas 32; Rebs: Fazekas 11; Asts: Hiejima 6	Arena: Taipei Heping Basketball Gymnasium; Attendance: 7,000; Referees: Rabah Noujaim (LBN), Hwang In-tae (KOR), Haryanto Sutaryo (INA)

2 July 2018	Philippines	53–89	Australia	Bocaue
19:30	Scoring by quarter: 18–23, 19–29, 16–37, game abandoned
	Pts: Blatche 12; Rebs: Blatche 10; Asts: Romeo 5	Boxscore	Pts: Goulding 20; Rebs: three players 4 Asts: three players 4	Arena: Philippine Arena; Attendance: 22,181; Referees: Ahmed Al-Bulushi (OMA), Hatim Al-Harbi (KSA), Paul Skayem (LBN)
Note: Australia won by default after the Philippine team was left with one player following a bench-clearing brawl.

=== Group C ===
Pos	Team	Pld	W	L	PF	PA	PD	Pts	Qualification
1	Jordan	6	5	1	575	452	+123	11 (Note: Jordan 1–1, +3 PD; Lebanon 1–1, –3 PD)	Second round
2	Lebanon	6	5	1	531	398	+133	11	Second round
3	Syria	6	2	4	402	503	−101	8	Second round
4	India	6	0	6	413	568	−155	6	

Source: FIBA
Rules for classification: 1) Points; 2) Head-to-head results; 3) Points difference; 4) Points scored.
Notes:

23 November 2017	Syria	72–109	Jordan	Zouk Mikael, Lebanon (Note: Syria played their home matches in Lebanon because of security concerns from the Syrian Civil War.)
17:00	Scoring by quarter: 14–30, 11–24, 22–22, 25–33
	Pts: Al-Jabi 20; Rebs: Todorović 10; Asts: three players 2 each	Boxscore	Pts: Kayed 24; Rebs: Abbas 10; Asts: Abdeen 6	Arena: Nouhad Nawfal Sports Complex; Attendance: 400; Referees: Mohammadreza Salehian (IRI), Hadi Salem (IRI), Alexandr Rulyov (KAZ)

23 November 2017	Lebanon	107–72	India	Zouk Mikael
21:00	Scoring by quarter: 23–11, 32–16, 30–25, 22–20
	Pts: Ibrahim 22; Rebs: Ibrahim 10; Asts: Arakji 6	Boxscore	Pts: Brar, Gill 13; Rebs: Bhamara 8 Asts: Pari 7	Arena: Nouhad Nawfal Sports Complex; Attendance: 1,900; Referees: Mohammad Doost (IRI), Alexey Stepanenko (KAZ), Sadegh Ghanbaridamanab (IRI)

26 November 2017	India	57–74	Syria	Bengaluru
19:00	Scoring by quarter: 14–15, 14–20, 14–25, 15–14
	Pts: Bhamara 14; Rebs: Annadurai 10; Asts: Pari 8	Boxscore	Pts: Madanly 21; Rebs: Al-Hamwi 13; Asts: Alhaddad 8	Arena: Sree Kanteerava Indoor Stadium; Attendance: 750; Referees: Reynaldo Yante (PHI), Chuang Chih-chun (TPE), Ho Chang-jen (TPE)

26 November 2017	Jordan	87–83	Lebanon	Amman
19:00	Scoring by quarter: 26–17, 19–19, 20–22, 22–25
	Pts: Tucker 32; Rebs: Hussein 9 Asts: Abbas 5	Boxscore	Pts: Arakji 21; Rebs: Bawji 8 Asts: Arakji 8	Arena: Prince Hamza Arena; Referees: Ahmed Al-Suwaili (IRQ), Yevgeniy Mikheyev (KAZ), Glenn Cornelio (PHI)

23 February 2018	Syria	63–87	Lebanon	Zouk Mikael, Lebanon
17:00	Scoring by quarter: 20–27, 20–20, 10–24, 13–16
	Pts: Hawkins 24; Rebs: Al-Hamwi 9 Asts: Madanly 7	Boxscore	Pts: Saoud 26; Rebs: Majok 11; Asts: Arakji 5	Arena: Nouhad Nawfal Sports Complex; Attendance: 2,800; Referees: Yevgeniy Mikheyev (KAZ), Mohammadreza Salehian (IRI), Hadi Salem (IRI)

23 February 2018	India	88–102	Jordan	Bengaluru
19:00	Scoring by quarter: 20–26, 18–25, 23–15, 27–36
	Pts: Annadurai 28; Rebs: Annadurai 11; Asts: Bhamara 8	Boxscore	Pts: Hussein 19; Rebs: Hussein 17; Asts: Abdeen, Tucker 7	Arena: Sree Kanteerava Indoor Stadium; Attendance: 2,000; Referees: Jassim Abdullah (QAT), Preeda Muongmee (THA), Alexandr Rulyov (KAZ)

26 February 2018	India	50–90	Lebanon	Bengaluru
19:00	Scoring by quarter: 16–22, 9–25, 12–21, 13–22
	Pts: J. Singh 14; Rebs: Y. Singh 7 Asts: Annadurai 4	Boxscore	Pts: Majok 17; Rebs: Majok 10; Asts: Arakji 6	Arena: Sree Kanteerava Indoor Stadium; Attendance: 1,000; Referees: Preeda Muongmee (THA), Jassim Abdullah (QAT), Alexandr Rulyov (KAZ)

26 February 2018	Jordan	87–62	Syria	Amman
19:00	Scoring by quarter: 16–12, 28–18, 20–16, 23–16
	Pts: Tucker 28; Rebs: Alhamarsheh 9 Asts: Abdeen 5	Boxscore	Pts: Hawkins 22; Rebs: Hawkins 10; Asts: Madanly 4	Arena: Prince Hamza Arena; Attendance: 9,000; Referees: Mohammad Doost (IRI), Hatim Alharbi (KSA), Sadegh Ghanbaridamanab (IRI)

28 June 2018	Syria	81–76	India	Zouk Mikael, Lebanon
17:00	Scoring by quarter: 21–12, 22–18, 21–24, 17–22
	Pts: Al-Hamwi 19; Rebs: Al-Hamwi 11; Asts: Madanly 4	Boxscore	Pts: S. Singh 18; Rebs: Arumugam, S. Singh 8 Asts: Pari 5	Arena: Nouhad Nawfal Sports Complex; Attendance: 200; Referees: Chen Ying-cheng (TPE), Ahmed Al-Shuwaili (IRQ), Chuang Chih-chun (TPE)

28 June 2018	Lebanon	77–76	Jordan	Zouk Mikael
21:30	Scoring by quarter: 24–14, 14–16, 20–24, 19–22
	Pts: Saoud 18; Rebs: Bawji 7 Asts: Saoud 6	Boxscore	Pts: Al-Dwairi 16; Rebs: Abbas 10; Asts: Abdeen 4	Arena: Nouhad Nawfal Sports Complex; Attendance: 7,500; Referees: Ferdinand Pascual (PHI), Takaki Kato (JPN), Jung Yu (TPE)

1 July 2018	Jordan	114–70	India	Amman
19:00	Scoring by quarter: 26–15, 29–18, 28–15, 31–22
	Pts: Al-Dwairi 21; Rebs: Al-Dwairi 7 Asts: Abbas 6	Boxscore	Pts: Arumugam 23; Rebs: S. Singh 8 Asts: Joseph, Pari 5	Arena: Prince Hamza Arena; Attendance: 5,000; Referees: Glenn Cornelio (PHI), Hadi Salem (IRN), Ho Chang-jen (TPE)

1 July 2018	Lebanon	87–50	Syria	Zouk Mikael
21:30	Scoring by quarter: 22–9, 23–21, 23–9, 19–11
	Pts: Saoud 28; Rebs: Bawji 15; Asts: Chartouny, Faris 4	Boxscore	Pts: Madanly 15; Rebs: Al-Hamwi 11; Asts: Madanly 4	Arena: Nouhad Nawfal Sports Complex; Attendance: 3,500; Referees: Alexey Stepanenko (KAZ), Anan Daraghma (PLE), Alexandr Rulyov (KAZ)

=== Group D ===
Pos	Team	Pld	W	L	PF	PA	PD	Pts	Qualification
1	Iran	6	5	1	454	351	+103	11	Second round
2	Kazakhstan	6	3	3	420	436	−16	9	Second round
3	Qatar	6	2	4	408	465	−57	8 (Note: Qatar 2–0; Iraq 0–2)	Second round
4	Iraq	6	2	4	412	442	−30	8	

Source: FIBA
Rules for classification: 1) Points. 2) Head-to-head results. 3) Points difference. 4) Points scored.
Notes:

24 November 2017	Qatar	70–82	Kazakhstan	Doha
18:00	Scoring by quarter: 20–20, 26–23, 7–19, 17–20
	Pts: Mohmmed 22; Rebs: Mohmmed, Saeed 7 Asts: Saad 4	Boxscore	Pts: Ponomarev 23; Rebs: Marchuk 7 Asts: Murzagaliyev 5	Arena: Ali Bin Hamad al-Attiyah Arena; Attendance: 950; Referees: Rabah Noujaim (LBN), Preeda Muongmee (THA), Anan Daraghma (PLE)

24 November 2017	Iraq	74–66	Iran	Amman, Jordan (Note: Iraq played their home matches in various countries because of security concerns from the Iraqi Civil War.)
19:00	Scoring by quarter: 20–22, 21–17, 14–15, 19–12
	Pts: Mayfield 24; Rebs: Mayfield 10; Asts: Mayfield 5	Boxscore	Pts: Aslani 16; Rebs: Kazemi 7 Asts: Hassanzadeh, Zangeneh 3	Arena: Prince Hamza Arena; Attendance: 400; Referees: Marwan Egho (LBN), Ceciline Vincent (IND), Mohammad Taha (JOR)

27 November 2017	Iran	65–39	Qatar	Tehran
17:00	Scoring by quarter: 20–12, 13–7, 16–12, 16–8
	Pts: Mirzaei 14; Rebs: Kazemi 17; Asts: Jamshidi 6	Boxscore	Pts: Saad 18; Rebs: Saad 6 Asts: three players 1	Arena: Azadi Basketball Hall; Attendance: 1,000; Referees: Paul Skayem (LBN), Ahmed Al-Bulushi (OMA), Imran Baig (IND)

27 November 2017	Kazakhstan	82–76(OT)	Iraq	Astana
20:00	Scoring by quarter: 21–15, 14–18, 22–24, 16–16, Overtime: 9–3
	Pts: Kolesnikov 21; Rebs: Kolesnikov 9 Asts: Kolesnikov 4	Boxscore	Pts: Abdullah 27; Rebs: Abdulqader 10; Asts: Abdulqader 5	Arena: Saryarka Velodrome; Attendance: 1,630; Referees: Marwan Egho (LBN), Hatim Alharbi (KSA), Chan Owe Shiong (MAS)

22 February 2018	Iraq	66–77	Qatar	Tehran, Iran
18:00	Scoring by quarter: 17–20, 15–19, 14–21, 20–17
	Pts: Mayfield 15; Rebs: Mayfield, Hameed 8 Asts: Mayfield 6	Boxscore	Pts: Saad 19; Rebs: Saeed 14; Asts: Elhadary 4	Arena: Azadi Basketball Hall; Attendance: 200; Referees: Marwan Egho (LBN), Ahmed Al-Bulushi (OMA), Amarjot Mavi (IND)

22 February 2018	Kazakhstan	54–75	Iran	Astana
20:00	Scoring by quarter: 15–16, 10–16, 11–15, 18–28
	Pts: Murzagaliyev 18; Rebs: Kolesnikov 14; Asts: Yergali 5	Boxscore	Pts: Nikkhah 21; Rebs: Haddadi 20; Asts: Nikkhah 8	Arena: Saryarka Velodrome; Attendance: 1,545; Referees: Rabah Noujaim (LBN), Ceciline Vincent (IND), Imran Baig (IND)

25 February 2018	Kazakhstan	96–63	Qatar	Astana
18:00	Scoring by quarter: 18–19, 15–14, 32–19, 31–11
	Pts: Yergali 22; Rebs: Marchuk 11; Asts: Murzagaliyev 9	Boxscore	Pts: Saad 15; Rebs: Saeed, Suliman 7 Asts: Saad 3	Arena: Saryarka Velodrome; Attendance: 1,652; Referees: Rabah Noujaim (LBN), Imran Baig (IND), Ceciline Vincent (IND)

25 February 2018	Iran	83–53	Iraq	Tehran
18:00	Scoring by quarter: 21–22, 19–13, 24–10, 19–8
	Pts: Nikkhah 16; Rebs: Haddadi 9 Asts: Nikkhah 7	Boxscore	Pts: Abdullah 12; Rebs: Mayfield 8 Asts: Abdulqader, Mayfield 3	Arena: Azadi Basketball Hall; Attendance: 2,300; Referees: Marwan Egho (LBN), Ahmed Al-Bulushi (OMA), Amarjot Singh (IND)

29 June 2018	Qatar	75–77	Iran	Doha
16:00	Scoring by quarter: 14–11, 24–18, 18–27, 19–21
	Pts: Johnson 21; Rebs: Suliman 9 Asts: three players 3	Boxscore	Pts: Haddadi 23; Rebs: Haddadi, Kazemi 14; Asts: Nikkhah 6	Arena: Al-Gharafa Sports Club Multi-Purpose Hall; Attendance: 200; Referees: Wang Mei (CHN), Yuen Chun Yip (HKG), Haryanto Sutaryo (INA)

29 June 2018	Iraq	64–50	Kazakhstan	Doha, Qatar
20:00	Scoring by quarter: 10–20, 11–16, 19–10, 24–4
	Pts: Ismael 22; Rebs: Mayfield 10; Asts: Abdulqader 6	Boxscore	Pts: Marchuk 14; Rebs: three players 6 Asts: Murzagaliyev 9	Arena: Al-Gharafa Sports Club Multi-Purpose Hall; Attendance: 200; Referees: Duan Zhu (CHN), Chan Owe Shiong (MAS), Ryan Jones (NZL)

2 July 2018	Iran	88–56	Kazakhstan	Tehran
16:30	Scoring by quarter: 31–6, 14–25, 20–9, 23–16
	Pts: Yakhchali 20; Rebs: Kazemi, Yakhchali 7 Asts: Nikkhah 6	Boxscore	Pts: Yergali 10; Rebs: Maidekin 7 Asts: Yergali 4	Arena: Azadi Basketball Hall; Attendance: 2,350; Referees: Ye Nan (CHN), Budi Marfan (INA), Preeda Muongmee (THA)

2 July 2018	Qatar	84–79(OT)	Iraq	Doha
18:00	Scoring by quarter: 19–24, 14–16, 28–17, 14–18, Overtime: 9–4
	Pts: Elhadary 21; Rebs: Johnson 7 Asts: Elhadary 5	Boxscore	Pts: Mayfield 27; Rebs: Mayfield 11; Asts: Mayfield 10	Arena: Al-Gharafa Sports Club Multi-Purpose Hall; Attendance: 550; Referees: Kim Jong-kuk (KOR), Mohammad Taha (JOR), Goh Poh Seng (SGP)

== Second round ==
In the second round, the top three teams from each group were placed in a group with three teams from another group. All results from the first qualification round were carried over to the second round. Games were played in September 2018, November 2018 and February 2019. The top three teams in each group along with the better placed fourth team qualified for the FIBA Basketball World Cup.

The 2019 FIBA Basketball World Cup host, China, was not taken into consideration for qualifying spots. However, all results related to the previous games of China in the relevant group were taken into account for the final standings.

=== Group E ===
Pos	Team	Pld	W	L	PF	PA	PD	Pts	Qualification
1	New Zealand	12	10	2	1090	861	+229	22 (Note: New Zealand 1–1, +3 PD; South Korea 1–1, –3 PD)	2019 FIBA Basketball World Cup
2	South Korea	12	10	2	1062	927	+135	22	2019 FIBA Basketball World Cup
3	Jordan	12	7	5	1037	951	+86	19 (Note: Jordan 1–1, +15 PD; China 1–1, –15 PD)	2019 FIBA Basketball World Cup
4	China (Note: China qualified as the host nation, and to determine the final standings of the Asian Qualifiers, China was not included. However all results related to the previous games of China in the relevant group were taken into account for the final standings.)	12	7	5	1004	834	+170	19	2019 FIBA Basketball World Cup as host
5	Lebanon	12	6	6	945	858	+87	18	
6	Syria	12	2	10	793	1088	−295	14	

Source: FIBA
Rules for classification: 1) Points; 2) Head-to-head results; 3) Points difference; 4) Points scored.
Notes:

13 September 2018	Syria	66–107	New Zealand	Zouk Mikael, Lebanon
17:00	Scoring by quarter: 12–20, 14–25, 19–31, 21–31
	Pts: Cheikh 16; Rebs: Al-Hamwi 8 Asts: Al-Hamwi 5	Boxscore	Pts: three players 16; Rebs: Loe 8 Asts: Ili, Kenny 5	Arena: Nouhad Nawfal Sports Complex; Attendance: 120; Referees: Ferdinand Pascual (PHI), Alexandr Rulyov (KAZ), Sadegh Ghanbaridamanab (IRI)

13 September 2018	Jordan	75–86	South Korea	Amman
18:30	Scoring by quarter: 18–17, 14–18, 25–24, 18–27
	Pts: Tucker 24; Rebs: Abbas 12; Asts: Abdeen 5	Boxscore	Pts: Ratliffe 30; Rebs: Ratliffe 7 Asts: Lee J.H. 8	Arena: Prince Hamza Arena; Attendance: 5,500; Referees: Ricor Buaron (PHI), Yu Jung (TPE), Imran Baig (IND)

13 September 2018	Lebanon	92–88(OT)	China	Zouk Mikael
21:30	Scoring by quarter: 17–20, 19–16, 18–25, 23–16, Overtime: 15–11
	Pts: Haidar 26; Rebs: Haidar 9 Asts: Akl 6	Boxscore	Pts: Zhou P. 22; Rebs: Hu J. 12; Asts: Hu J., Zhou P. 4	Arena: Nouhad Nawfal Sports Complex; Attendance: 6,289; Referees: Yevgeniy Mikheyev (KAZ), Takaki Kato (JPN), Mohammadreza Salehian (IRI)

17 September 2018	New Zealand	63–60	Lebanon	Rotorua
19:10	Scoring by quarter: 7–18, 18–7, 20–21, 18–14
	Pts: Ili 14; Rebs: Loe 11; Asts: T. Webster 4	Boxscore	Pts: Rustom 19; Rebs: Haidar, Majok 11; Asts: Akl 4	Arena: Energy Events Centre; Referees: Ferdinand Pascual (PHI), Chuang Chih-chun (TPE), Alexandr Rulyov (KAZ)

17 September 2018	China	88–79	Jordan	Beijing
19:35	Scoring by quarter: 14–21, 14–13, 27–23, 33–22
	Pts: Wu 17; Rebs: Wu 7 Asts: Hu M. 9	Boxscore	Pts: Tucker 23; Rebs: Al-Dwairi 7 Asts: three players 3	Arena: Cadillac Arena; Attendance: 12,000; Referees: Michael Aylen (AUS), Ricor Buaron (PHI), Vaughan Mayberry (AUS)

17 September 2018	South Korea	103–66	Syria	Goyang
20:00	Scoring by quarter: 24–13, 23–17, 32–20, 24–18
	Pts: Ratliffe 41; Rebs: Ratliffe 17; Asts: Choi 8	Boxscore	Pts: Hawkins 33; Rebs: Hawkins 11; Asts: Alhaddad 4	Arena: Goyang Gymnasium; Attendance: 1,279; Referees: Scott Beker (AUS), Yuji Hirahara (JPN), Christopher Reid (AUS)

29 November 2018	New Zealand	95–69	Jordan	Christchurch
19:10	Scoring by quarter: 29–17, 22–13, 22–16, 22–23
	Pts: Abercrombie 18; Rebs: Vukona 7 Asts: Ili 9	Boxscore	Pts: Abuwazaneh 13; Rebs: Abbas, Abuwazaneh 7 Asts: Al-Awadi, Eid 3	Arena: Horncastle Arena; Attendance: 5,000; Referees: Yu Jung (TPE), Budi Marfan (INA), Yuen Chun Yip (HKG)

29 November 2018	South Korea	84–71	Lebanon	Busan
19:30	Scoring by quarter: 14–14, 13–21, 28–17, 29–19
	Pts: Ratliffe 23; Rebs: Ratliffe 13; Asts: Kim 5	Boxscore	Pts: Haidar 19; Rebs: Majok 17; Asts: Akl, Haidar 2	Arena: Sajik Arena; Attendance: 1,949; Referees: Takaki Kato (JPN), Ricor Buaron (PHI), Yuji Hirahara (JPN)

29 November 2018	China	101–52	Syria	Shanghai
20:00	Scoring by quarter: 31–4, 18–19, 29–9, 23–20
	Pts: Wu 18; Rebs: Wang Zh. 9 Asts: Guo 6	Boxscore	Pts: Al Osh 15; Rebs: three players 6 Asts: Khori 4	Arena: Shanghai Baoshan Indoor Stadium; Attendance: 4,000; Referees: Ferdinand Pascual (PHI), Scott Beker (AUS), James Boyer (AUS)

2 December 2018	New Zealand	97–74	Syria	Wellington
15:10	Scoring by quarter: 31–5, 30–21, 25–24, 11–24
	Pts: Abercrombie 15; Rebs: three players 4 Asts: Perrott-Hunt 6	Boxscore	Pts: Aljabi 18; Rebs: Al-Hamwi 9 Asts: Al Osh 5	Arena: TSB Bank Arena; Attendance: 3,100; Referees: Ferdinand Pascual (PHI), Takaki Kato (JPN), Ricor Buaron (PHI)

2 December 2018	South Korea	88–67	Jordan	Busan
15:00	Scoring by quarter: 17–16, 15–14, 25–19, 31–18
	Pts: Lee J.H. 19; Rebs: Ratliffe 16; Asts: Lee J.H. 6	Boxscore	Pts: Tucker 20; Rebs: three players 8 Asts: Kanaan 4	Arena: Sajik Arena; Attendance: 3,132; Referees: Yevgeniy Mikheyev (KAZ), James Boyer (AUS), Michael Aylen (AUS)

2 December 2018	China	72–52	Lebanon	Foshan
19:35	Scoring by quarter: 17–10, 26–9, 20–15, 9–18
	Pts: Yi 15; Rebs: Yi 8 Asts: Wu 4	Boxscore	Pts: Ibrahim 14; Rebs: Majok 10; Asts: Abdelnour 3	Arena: Foshan International Sports and Cultural Center; Attendance: 11,000; Referees: Scott Beker (AUS), Budi Marfan (INA), Alexandr Rulyov (KAZ)

22 February 2019	Syria	74–87	South Korea	Zouk Mikael, Lebanon
16:00	Scoring by quarter: 15–24, 17–17, 15–27, 27–19
	Pts: Aljabi 17; Rebs: Al-Hamwi 10; Asts: Alhaddad 4	Boxscore	Pts: Ratliffe 25; Rebs: Ratliffe 12; Asts: Park 8	Arena: Nouhad Nawfal Sports Complex; Attendance: 100; Referees: Yevgeniy Mikheyev (KAZ), Ricor Buaron (PHI), Yuji Hirahara (JPN)

22 February 2019	Jordan	86–62	China	Amman
19:30	Scoring by quarter: 24–18, 24–12, 16–17, 22–15
	Pts: Tucker 32; Rebs: Hussein 14; Asts: Tucker 5	Boxscore	Pts: Zhao R. 20; Rebs: Zhou Q. 10; Asts: Fang 3	Arena: Prince Hamza Arena; Attendance: 6,628; Referees: Michael Aylen (AUS), James Boyer (AUS), Budi Marfan (INA)

22 February 2019	Lebanon	67–69	New Zealand	Zouk Mikael
21:30	Scoring by quarter: 13–16, 17–21, 22–15, 15–17
	Pts: Haidar 16; Rebs: Haidar 11; Asts: Arakji 4	Boxscore	Pts: Abercrombie 19; Rebs: Delany 8 Asts: Ili 6	Arena: Nouhad Nawfal Sports Complex; Attendance: 7,500; Referees: Harja Jaladri (INA), Takaki Kato (JPN), Christopher Reid (AUS)

24 February 2019	Syria	59–90	China	Zouk Mikael, Lebanon
12:30	Scoring by quarter: 18–12, 13–25, 12–21, 16–32
	Pts: Magd Harbasha 12; Rebs: Hani Adribe 8 Asts: William Alhaddad 5	Boxscore	Pts: Zhou Q. 32; Rebs: Zhou Q. 10; Asts: Fang, Yu 4	Arena: Nouhad Nawfal Sports Complex; Attendance: 100; Referees: Ferdinand Pascual (PHI), Takaki Kato (JPN), Yuji Hirahara (JPN)

24 February 2019	Jordan	86–80	New Zealand	Amman
16:30	Scoring by quarter: 16–19, 20–16, 24–21, 26–24
	Pts: Tucker 25; Rebs: Tucker 14; Asts: Tucker 8	Boxscore	Pts: Webster 18; Rebs: Abercrombie, Ili 8 Asts: Webster 7	Arena: Prince Hamza Arena; Attendance: 6,000; Referees: Yevgeniy Mikheyev (KAZ), Harja Jaladri (INA), Chun Yip Yuen (HKG)

24 February 2019	Lebanon	72–84	South Korea	Zouk Mikael
16:30	Scoring by quarter: 29–18, 15–22, 20–22, 8–22
	Pts: Arakji 19; Rebs: Abdelnour 9 Asts: Arakji 5	Boxscore	Pts: Ratliffe 25; Rebs: Ratliffe 11; Asts: Lee S.H., Park 4	Arena: Nouhad Nawfal Sports Complex; Attendance: 7,500; Referees: Michael Aylen (AUS), James Boyer (AUS), Budi Marfan (INA)

=== Group F ===
Pos	Team	Pld	W	L	PF	PA	PD	Pts	Qualification
1	Australia	12	10	2	1055	727	+328	22	2019 FIBA Basketball World Cup
2	Japan	12	8	4	988	844	+144	20 (Note: Japan 2–0; Iran 0–2)	2019 FIBA Basketball World Cup
3	Iran	12	8	4	890	811	+79	20	2019 FIBA Basketball World Cup
4	Philippines	12	7	5	970	935	+35	19	2019 FIBA Basketball World Cup
5	Kazakhstan	12	4	8	828	963	−135	16	
6	Qatar	12	2	10	732	1027	−295	14	

Source: FIBA
Rules for classification: 1) Points; 2) Head-to-head results; 3) Points difference; 4) Points scored.
Notes:

13 September 2018	Iran	81–73	Philippines	Tehran
17:00	Scoring by quarter: 21–22, 19–16, 23–21, 18–14
	Pts: Nikkhah 21; Rebs: Kazemi 11; Asts: Mashayekhi, Nikkhah 4	Boxscore	Pts: Standhardinger 30; Rebs: Standhardinger 12; Asts: Cabagnot 5	Arena: Azadi Basketball Hall; Attendance: 2,475; Referees: Duan Zhu (CHN), Hwang In-tae (KOR), Kim Jong-kuk (KOR)

13 September 2018	Qatar	43–95	Australia	Doha
18:00	Scoring by quarter: 12–24, 12–16, 3–30, 16–25
	Pts: Ngombo 14; Rebs: Ngombo 8 Asts: Lashin, Ngombo 2	Boxscore	Pts: Wagstaff 18; Rebs: Brandt 7 Asts: three players 4	Arena: Al-Gharafa Sports Club Multi-Purpose Hall; Attendance: 957; Referees: Marwan Egho (LBN), Ahmed Al-Suwaili (IRQ), Mohammad Taha (JOR)

13 September 2018	Kazakhstan	70–85	Japan	Almaty
20:00	Scoring by quarter: 20–28, 14–21, 16–21, 20–15
	Pts: Kuanov 16; Rebs: Marchuk 6 Asts: Kuanov 5	Boxscore	Pts: Hachimura 24; Rebs: Brown 8 Asts: Togashi 4	Arena: Baluan Sholak Sports Palace; Attendance: 2,500; Referees: Rabah Noujaim (LBN), Budi Marfan (INA), Yuen Chun Yip (HKG)

17 September 2018	Japan	70–56	Iran	Tokyo
17:10	Scoring by quarter: 16–22, 15–13, 26–8, 13–13
	Pts: Hachimura 25; Rebs: Brown, Takeuchi 8 Asts: Hachimura, Hiejima 3	Boxscore	Pts: Yakhchali 21; Rebs: Mirzaei 8 Asts: Kazemi 3	Arena: Ota City General Gymnasium; Referees: Budi Marfan (INA), Marwan Egho (LBN), Yuen Chun Yip (HKG)

17 September 2018	Australia	94–41	Kazakhstan	Bendigo
19:00	Scoring by quarter: 22–6, 19–13, 24–15, 29–7
	Pts: McCarron 15; Rebs: Johnson, Sobey 5 Asts: Johnson, Kay 5	Boxscore	Pts: Gavrilov 8 Rebs: Zhigulin 6 Asts: Marchuk 3	Arena: Bendigo Stadium; Attendance: 3,023; Referees: Hwang In-tae (KOR), Kim Jong-kuk (KOR), Imran Baig (IND)

17 September 2018	Philippines	92–81	Qatar	Quezon City
19:30	Scoring by quarter: 15–26, 24–26, 28–12, 25–17
	Pts: Aguilar, Cabagnot 16; Rebs: Aguilar 9 Asts: four players 3	Boxscore	Pts: Yousuf 26; Rebs: Ngombo 10; Asts: Yousuf, Ngombo 5	Arena: Smart Araneta Coliseum; Attendance: 0 (Note: The game was played behind closed doors due to sanctions imposed by FIBA following the Philippines-Australia brawl.); Referees: Rabah Noujaim (LBN), Ahmed Al-Shuwaili (IRQ), Ryan Jones (NZL)

30 November 2018	Australia	76–47	Iran	Melbourne
19:35	Scoring by quarter: 24–16, 19–8, 21–10, 12–13
	Pts: Johnson 12; Rebs: Hodgson, Kay 6 Asts: Cadee 4	Boxscore	Pts: Yakhchali 12; Rebs: Mirzaei 6 Asts: Davoudi, Jamshidi 2	Arena: Margaret Court Arena; Attendance: 5,325; Referees: Chuang Chih-chun (TPE), Kim Jong-kuk (KOR), Park Kyoung-jin (KOR)

30 November 2018	Japan	85–47	Qatar	Toyama
19:00	Scoring by quarter: 20–15, 11–17, 30–8, 24–7
	Pts: Fazekas 19; Rebs: Fazekas 10; Asts: Tanaka 7	Boxscore	Pts: Abdelhaleem, Yousuf 10; Rebs: Yousuf 5 Asts: four players 2	Arena: Toyama City Gymnasium; Attendance: 4,300; Referees: Rabah Noujaim (LBN), Ryan Jones (NZL), Ahmed Al-Shuwaili (IRQ)

30 November 2018	Philippines	88–92	Kazakhstan	Pasay
19:30	Scoring by quarter: 18–17, 21–23, 23–25, 26–27
	Pts: Pringle 29; Rebs: Fajardo 13; Asts: Pringle 4	Boxscore	Pts: Zhigulin 30; Rebs: Bykov 9 Asts: Murzagaliyev 6	Arena: Mall of Asia Arena; Attendance: 16,798; Referees: Hwang In-tae (KOR), Harja Jaladri (INA), Ye Nan (CHN)

3 December 2018	Australia	110–59	Qatar	Melbourne
19:35	Scoring by quarter: 30–18, 20–16, 32–14, 28–11
	Pts: Cadee 21; Rebs: Blanchfield, Kay 6 Asts: Sobey 7	Boxscore	Pts: Yousuf 13; Rebs: Mujkić, Saleem 4 Asts: Hassan 3	Arena: Margaret Court Arena; Attendance: 3,546; Referees: Hwang In-tae (KOR), Park Kyoung-jin (KOR), Kim Jong-kuk (KOR)

3 December 2018	Japan	86–70	Kazakhstan	Toyama
19:00	Scoring by quarter: 19–25, 15–8, 28–25, 24–12
	Pts: Fazekas 41; Rebs: Fazekas 15; Asts: Tanaka 4	Boxscore	Pts: Zhigulin 23; Rebs: Bykov 7 Asts: Marchuk 4	Arena: Toyama City Gymnasium; Attendance: 4,192; Referees: Yu Jung (TPE), Chuang Chin-chun (TPE), Ahmed Al-Suwaili (IRQ)

3 December 2018	Philippines	70–78	Iran	Pasay
19:30	Scoring by quarter: 20–19, 19–16, 15–15, 16–28
	Pts: Castro 19; Rebs: Standhardinger 8 Asts: Lassiter 7	Boxscore	Pts: Jamshidi 26; Rebs: Hassanzadeh, Mirzaei 8 Asts: Jamshidi 7	Arena: Mall of Asia Arena; Attendance: 14,743; Referees: Duan Zhu (CHN), Rabah Noujaim (LBN), Marwan Egho (LBN)

21 February 2019	Kazakhstan	60–81	Australia	Astana
20:00	Scoring by quarter: 20–27, 8–12, 8–17, 24–25
	Pts: Clemmons 31; Rebs: Gavrilov, Zhigulin 8 Asts: Clemmons, Zhigulin 3	Boxscore	Pts: Humphries 17; Rebs: Humphries 7 Asts: Naar 6	Arena: Saryarka Velodrome; Attendance: 1,960; Referees: Rabah Noujaim (LBN), Kim Jong-kuk (KOR), Leong Chuen Wing (SGP)

21 February 2019	Iran	89–97	Japan	Tehran
18:00	Scoring by quarter: 28–35, 17–20, 22–23, 22–19
	Pts: Jamshidi 33; Rebs: Hassanzadeh, Mirzaei 8 Asts: Yakhchali 6	Boxscore	Pts: Fazekas 26; Rebs: Fazekas 8 Asts: Hiejima 6	Arena: Azadi Basketball Hall; Attendance: 3,000; Referees: Duan Zhu (CHN), Ye Nan (CHN), Park Kyoung-jin (KOR)

21 February 2019	Qatar	46–84	Philippines	Doha
19:00	Scoring by quarter: 11–15, 10–16, 9–31, 16–22
	Pts: Saeed 10; Rebs: Saeed 8 Asts: Suliman 3	Boxscore	Pts: Blatche 17; Rebs: Blatche 15; Asts: Blatche 7	Arena: Al-Gharafa Sports Club Multi-Purpose Hall; Attendance: 3,272; Referees: Hwang In-tae (KOR), Yu Jung (TPE), Ahmed Al-Shuwaili (IRQ)

24 February 2019	Qatar	48–96	Japan	Doha
17:30	Scoring by quarter: 8–15, 17–27, 9–22, 14–32
	Pts: Al-Rayes, Fouda 11; Rebs: Abdelhaleem 9 Asts: Fouda 3	Boxscore	Pts: Fazekas 20; Rebs: Fazekas 19; Asts: Hiejima, Tsuji 4	Arena: Al-Gharafa Sports Club Multi-Purpose Hall; Attendance: 269; Referees: Hwang In-tae (KOR), Chuang Chih-chun (TPE), Kim Jong-kuk (KOR)

24 February 2019	Iran	85–74	Australia	Tehran
18:00	Scoring by quarter: 25–15, 18–15, 20–22, 22–22
	Pts: Jamshidi 25; Rebs: Mirzaei 10; Asts: Jamshidi, Yakhchali 4	Boxscore	Pts: Creek 20; Rebs: Creek 9 Asts: Naar 6	Arena: Azadi Basketball Hall; Attendance: 2,500; Referees: Rabah Noujaim (LBN), Yu Jung (TPE), Ahmed Al-Shuwaili (IRQ)

24 February 2019	Kazakhstan	75–93	Philippines	Astana
20:30	Scoring by quarter: 21–22, 19–23, 20–26, 15–22
	Pts: Clemmons 27; Rebs: Murzagaliyev, Yergali 6 Asts: Clemmons 9	Boxscore	Pts: Blatche 41; Rebs: Blatche 13; Asts: four players 3	Arena: Saryarka Velodrome; Attendance: 2,392; Referees: Duan Zhu (CHN), Ye Nan (CHN), Park Kyoung-jin (KOR)

=== Best fourth placed team ===
Pos	Grp	Team	Pld	W	L	PF	PA	PD	Pts	Qualification
1	F	Philippines	12	7	5	970	935	+35	19	2019 FIBA Basketball World Cup
2	E	Lebanon	12	6	6	945	858	+87	18	(Note: China, the fourth placers of Group E already qualified as the host nation, and to determine the final standings of the Asian Qualifiers, China was not included. However all results related to the previous games of China in the relevant group were taken into account for the final standings. Lebanon, the fifth placers, were considered as fourth placers for the purpose of determining the team that qualified as the best fourth placed team.)

Source: FIBA

== Statistical leaders ==
=== Players ===
Points

Pos.	Name	PPG
1	(Japan) Nick Fazekas	27.2
2	(South Korea) Ricardo Ratliffe	26.7
3	(Jordan) Dar Tucker	21.5
4	(Iraq) DeMario Mayfield	19.5
5	(Lebanon) Wael Arakji	16.3

Rebounds

Pos.	Name	RPG
1	(South Korea) Ricardo Ratliffe	12.5
1	(Japan) Nick Fazekas	12.5
3	(Philippines) Andray Blatche	12.4
4	(Iran) Arsalan Kazemi	9.4
5	(Japan) Ira Brown	9.0

Steals

Pos.	Name	SPG
1	(Iraq) DeMario Mayfield	2.7
2	(Syria) Micheal Madanly	2.3
3	(Philippines) Andray Blatche	2.0
3	(Iran) Sajjad Mashayekhi	2.0
5	(Philippines) Gabe Norwood	1.9

Assists

Pos.	Name	APG
1	(Lebanon) Wael Arakji	5.7
2	(New Zealand) Shea Ili	5.5
3	(Iraq) DeMario Mayfield	5.3
4	(New Zealand) Tai Webster	5.0
5	(South Korea) Lee Jung-hyun	4.5

Blocks

Pos.	Name	BPG
1	(Lebanon) Ater Majok	2.5
1	(Chinese Taipei) Quincy Davis	2.5
3	(Philippines) Andray Blatche	2.4
4	(Syria) Abdulwahab Al-Hamwi	2.0
5	(South Korea) Ricardo Ratliffe	1.7

Minutes

Pos.	Name	MPG
1	(Iraq) DeMario Mayfield	37.7
2	(Iran) Behnam Yakhchali	33.7
3	(South Korea) Ricardo Ratliffe	33.5
4	(Chinese Taipei) Quincy Davis	33.0
5	(Kazakhstan) Rustam Yergali	31.6

Double-Doubles

Pos.	Name	DblDbl
1	(South Korea) Ricardo Ratliffe	8
2	(Philippines) Andray Blatche	6
3	(Japan) Nick Fazekas	5
4	(Lebanon) Ater Majok	4
5	(Jordan) Zaid Abbas	3
5	(Syria) Abdulwahab Al-Hamwi	3

Other statistical leaders

Stat	Name	Avg.
Field goal percentage	(Australia) Mitch Creek	64.0%
3-point FG percentage	(Philippines) Jayson Castro	58.6%
Free throw percentage	(Japan) Nick Fazekas	86.2%
Turnovers	(India) Satnam Singh	4.5
Fouls	(Lebanon) Ater Majok	3.3

== Controversy ==
=== Australia – Philippines brawl ===
During the Group B match between the Philippines and Australia on 2 July 2018 in the Philippine Arena, a bench-clearing brawl broke out when an Australian player intentionally elbowed a Filipino player with 4:02 remaining in the third quarter, resulting in 13 players (nine from the Philippines and four from Australia) being ejected. The game was halted with 1:57 remaining in the third quarter when two of the remaining Filipino players fouled out, and awarded the win to Australia by default.
