= 2016 FIBA Asia Challenge =

6th Asia Challenge

Tournament details
- Host country: Iran
- Dates: 9–18 September
- Teams: 12 (from 1 federation)
- Venue: 2 (in 1 host city)

Final positions
- Champions: Iran (3rd title)

Tournament statistics
- MVP: (Iran) Hamed Haddadi
- Top scorer: (Jordan) Tucker (26.8)
- Top rebounds: (Iran) Haddadi (13.8)
- Top assists: (South Korea) Kim S.H. (6.0)
- PPG (Team): Jordan (94.8)
- RPG (Team): Iran (51.8)
- APG (Team): South Korea (17.4)

Official website
- http://www.fiba.com/

The 2016 FIBA Asia Challenge was the 6th FIBA Asia Challenge, an international basketball tournament of FIBA Asia which was hosted by Iran from 9–18 September 2016. This tournament served as the first step in determining the process of the qualifiers for the 2017 FIBA Asia Cup which will feature teams from both FIBA Asia and FIBA Oceania for the first time. Iran are the defending champion from 2014.

The top five teams earned their respective sub-confederations an extra berth for the 2017 FIBA Asia Cup which is formerly named as the FIBA Asia Championship. The 2017 tournament is not an edition of the FIBA Asia Challenge, which was formerly named as FIBA Asia Cup until 2014.

== Qualification ==
According to the FIBA Asia rules, the number of participating teams in the 2016 FIBA Asia Challenge is twelve. Each zone had one place, and the hosts (Iran) and the defending FIBA Asia Championship titleholder (China) were automatically qualified. The other two places were allocated to the zones according to performance in the 2015 FIBA Asia Championship; as a result, Southeast Asia and West Asia zones were allocated an additional berth each.

In the event of a withdrawal or non-participation by qualified teams, FIBA Asia has the right to invite other teams, while endeavoring to maintain, as far as possible, a certain balance between sub-zones.

Included are teams' FIBA World Ranking prior to the tournament.

Central Asia (1)	East Asia (1+1+1+1)	Gulf (1)	South Asia (1)	Southeast Asia (1+1)	West Asia (1+1+1)
Kazakhstan (56)	China (14)	Qatar (50)	India (53)	Philippines (27)	Iran (25)
	South Korea (30)			Thailand (81)	Jordan (28)
	Chinese Taipei (48)				Iraq (NR)
	Japan (48)				

== Venue ==
The Azadi Indoor Stadium, also known as the Twelve Thousand People Sport Hall, was the venue of competition. However quarterfinals matches were held in Azadi Basketball Hall due to Tehran Derby.

== Draw ==
The results of the draw for the competition was announced on August 14, 2016.

== Preliminary round ==
All teams advanced to the second round.

All times are local (UTC+4:30).

=== Group A ===
Pos	Team	Pld	W	L	PF	PA	PD	Pts	Qualification
1	China	2	2	0	200	161	+39	4	Second Round
2	Jordan	2	1	1	165	165	0	3	Second Round
3	Kazakhstan	2	0	2	156	195	−39	2	Second Round

Source: FIBA Asia

9 September
18:30

Boxscore

China	94–76	Jordan
Scoring by quarter: 24–23, 31–9, 10–20, 29–24
Pts: Yuan 19; Rebs: Hu 9 Asts: Fang 5		Pts: Tucker 29; Rebs: Tucker 8 Asts: Abbas, Al-Awadi 2

Azadi Indoor Stadium, Tehran
Referees: Harja Jaladri (INA), Preeda Muongmee (THA), Mohammadreza Salehian (IRI)

10 September
20:45

Boxscore

Jordan	89–71	Kazakhstan
Scoring by quarter: 37–13, 13–19, 18–24, 21–15
Pts: Abbas 22; Rebs: Abbas, Hussein 7 Asts: Tucker 6		Pts: Micheev 20; Rebs: Bazhkin, Micheev 7 Asts: Yevstigneyev 4

Azadi Indoor Stadium, Tehran
Referees: Hwang In-tae (KOR), Takaki Kato (JPN), Mohammad Doost (IRI)

11 September
20:45

Boxscore

Kazakhstan	85–106	China
Scoring by quarter: 24–32, 20–33, 19–22, 22–19
Pts: Ilin 21; Rebs: Lapchenko 7 Asts: Ilin 4		Pts: Hu 19; Rebs: Hu 7 Asts: Liu 5

Azadi Indoor Stadium, Tehran
Referees: Ahmed Al Bulushi (OMA), Kim Jong-kuk (KOR), Hassan Nikkhah Gorshari (IRI)

=== Group B ===
Pos	Team	Pld	W	L	PF	PA	PD	Pts	Qualification
1	Chinese Taipei	2	2	0	177	142	+35	4	Second Round
2	India	2	1	1	157	173	−16	3	Second Round
3	Philippines	2	0	2	159	178	−19	2	Second Round

Source: FIBA Asia

9 September
20:45

Boxscore

Philippines	83–91	India
Scoring by quarter: 25–16, 21–31, 12–21, 25–23
Pts: Belo 21; Rebs: Daquioag 7 Asts: Daquioag 3		Pts: Amj. Singh 24; Rebs: Amj. Singh 18; Asts: Amr. Singh 5

Azadi Indoor Stadium, Tehran
Referees: Hwang In-tae (KOR), Ahmed Al-Suwaili (IRQ), Mohammad Doost (IRI)

10 September
16:15

Boxscore

India	66–90	Chinese Taipei
Scoring by quarter: 20–26, 15–15, 15–26, 16–23
Pts: Bhriguvanshi 34; Rebs: Amr. Singh 10; Asts: Amr. Singh 3		Pts: Chou Y.H. 23; Rebs: Davis 14; Asts: Chiang 6

Azadi Indoor Stadium, Tehran
Referees: Kim Jong-kuk (KOR), Ahmed Al-Suwaili (IRQ), Hassan Nikkhah Gorshari (IRI)

11 September
16:15

Boxscore

Chinese Taipei	87–76	Philippines
Scoring by quarter: 17–24, 21–19, 24–19, 25–14
Pts: Davis 19; Rebs: Davis 16; Asts: Davis 5		Pts: Belo 17; Rebs: Van Opstal 8 Asts: Ferrer 3

Azadi Indoor Stadium, Tehran
Referees: Yuji Hirahara (JPN), Hwang In-tae (KOR), Mohammadreza Salehian (IRI)

=== Group C ===
Pos	Team	Pld	W	L	PF	PA	PD	Pts	Qualification
1	Iran (H)	2	2	0	175	100	+75	4	Second Round
2	Iraq	2	1	1	122	148	−26	3	Second Round
3	Qatar	2	0	2	103	152	−49	2	Second Round

Source: FIBA Asia
(H) Hosts

9 September
16:15

Boxscore

Iran	81–49	Qatar
Scoring by quarter: 28–7, 19–15, 11–14, 23–13
Pts: Haddadi 15; Rebs: Kazemi 10; Asts: Jamshidi 4		Pts: M. Mohamed, M. H. Mohamed 11; Rebs: Saad 7 Asts: Watson 3

Azadi Indoor Stadium, Tehran
Referees: Ferdinand Pascual (PHI), Alexey Stepanenko (KAZ), Takeki Kato (JPN)

10 September
18:30

Boxscore

Qatar	54–71	Iraq
Scoring by quarter: 10–14, 9–14, 20–20, 15–23
Pts: M. H . Mohamed 18; Rebs: M. Mohamed 7 Asts: Watson 4		Pts: Galloway 21; Rebs: Hameed 11; Asts: Galloway 3

Azadi Indoor Stadium, Tehran
Referees: Ahmed Al Bulushi (OMA), Reynaldo Yante (PHI), Yu Jung (TPE)

11 September
18:30

Boxscore

Iraq	51–94	Iran
Scoring by quarter: 10–23, 13–26, 12–25, 16–20
Pts: Galloway 10; Rebs: Galloway 7 Asts: Galloway 5		Pts: Haddadi 15; Rebs: Kazemi 11; Asts: Kazemi 5

Azadi Indoor Stadium, Tehran
Referees: Rabah Noujaim (LIB), Alexey Stepanenko (KAZ), Reynaldo Yante (PHI)

=== Group D ===
Pos	Team	Pld	W	L	PF	PA	PD	Pts	Qualification
1	South Korea	2	2	0	164	116	+48	4	Second Round
2	Japan	2	1	1	169	147	+22	3	Second Round
3	Thailand	2	0	2	110	180	−70	2	Second Round

Source: FIBA Asia

9 September
14:00

Boxscore

Japan	73–80	South Korea
Scoring by quarter: 22–13, 12–25, 21–16, 18–26
Pts: Hiejima 29; Rebs: Brown 14; Asts: Hiejima 6		Pts: Kim S.H. 22; Rebs: Kim J.K. 10; Asts: Kim S.H. 8

Azadi Indoor Stadium, Tehran
Referees: Ahmed Al Bulushi (OMA), Mohammad Taha (JOR), Reynaldo Yante (PHI)

10 September
14:00

Boxscore

South Korea	84–43	Thailand
Scoring by quarter: 28–8, 14–11, 23–9, 19–15
Pts: Lee J.H. 12; Rebs: Jang 9 Asts: Heo H., Kim S.H. 6		Pts: Jakrawan 8 Rebs: Ghogar 7 Asts: Muangboon 2

Azadi Indoor Stadium, Tehran
Referees: Ferdinand Pascual (PHI), Alexey Stepanenko (KAZ), Mohammad Taha (JOR)

11 September
14:00

Boxscore

Thailand	67–96	Japan
Scoring by quarter: 22–17, 17–26, 14–27, 14–26
Pts: Klahan 17; Rebs: Jakrawan 8 Asts: Muangboon 2		Pts: Brown 19; Rebs: Brown 11; Asts: Shinoyama 9

Azadi Indoor Stadium, Tehran
Referees: Ferdinand Pascual (PHI), Mohammad Taha (JOR), Yu Jung (TPE)

== Second round ==
=== Group E ===
Pos	Team	Pld	W	L	PF	PA	PD	Pts	Qualification
1	China	5	4	1	432	384	+48	9 (Note: China 94–76 Jordan)	Final round
2	Jordan	5	4	1	514	418	+96	9	Final round
3	Chinese Taipei	5	3	2	440	421	+19	8 (Note: India 66–90 Chinese Taipei)	Final round
4	India	5	3	2	392	448	−56	8	Final round
5	Philippines	5	1	4	427	458	−31	6	
6	Kazakhstan	5	0	5	409	485	−76	5	

Source: FIBA Asia
Notes:

12 September
10:00

Boxscore

Jordan	121–65	India
Scoring by quarter: 37–17, 19–16, 29–20, 36–12
Pts: Eid 19; Rebs: Zaghab 10; Asts: Abu Hawwas 6		Pts: Amj. Singh, Amr. Singh 13; Rebs: Amr. Singh 10; Asts: Bhardwaj, Bhriguvanshi 2

Azadi Indoor Stadium, Tehran
Referees: Hwang In-tae (KOR), Takaki Kato (JPN), Hassan Nikkhah Gorshari (IRI)

12 September
12:00

Boxscore

China	75–65	Philippines
Scoring by quarter: 18–14, 21–12, 18–25, 18–14
Pts: Hu 21; Rebs: Zou 13; Asts: Cui, Liu 3		Pts: Belo 16; Rebs: Belo 7 Asts: five players 2 each

Azadi Indoor Stadium, Tehran
Referees: Ahmed Al-Suwaili (IRQ), Kim Jong-kuk (KOR), Mohammadreza Salehian (IRI)

12 September
14:00

Boxscore

Kazakhstan	77–92	Chinese Taipei
Scoring by quarter: 13–24, 17–14, 22–24, 25–30
Pts: Ilin 21; Rebs: Yevstigneyev 7 Asts: Gubashev, Micheev 3		Pts: Liu 28; Rebs: Chiang, Chou P.C. 7 Asts: Davis 5

Azadi Indoor Stadium, Tehran
Referees: Yuji Hirahara (JPN), Preeda Muongmee (THA), Mohammad Doost (IRI)

13 September
10:00

Boxscore

Philippines	98–86	Kazakhstan
Scoring by quarter: 27–15, 20–22, 23–29, 28–20
Pts: Belo 30; Rebs: Belo 11; Asts: Daquioag 4		Pts: Yevstigneyev 23; Rebs: Bazhkin 18; Asts: Ilin 3

Azadi Indoor Stadium, Tehran
Referees: Hwang In-tae (KOR), Takaki Kato (JPN), Mohammad Doost (IRI)

13 September
12:00

Boxscore

India	70–64	China
Scoring by quarter: 14–17, 17–12, 20–16, 19–19
Pts: Amr. Singh 23; Rebs: Amr. Singh 14; Asts: Bhriguvanshi 6		Pts: Hu 19; Rebs: Hu 9 Asts: Fang 4

Azadi Indoor Stadium, Tehran
Referees: Ahmed Al-Suwaili (IRQ), Preeda Muongmee (THA), Hassan Nikkhah Gorshari (IRI)

13 September
16:00

Boxscore

Chinese Taipei	83–109	Jordan
Scoring by quarter: 19–24, 19–25, 24–30, 21–30
Pts: Davis 24; Rebs: Davis 9 Asts: Liu, Chou P. 3		Pts: Tucker 36; Rebs: Abbas 12; Asts: Tucker 4

Azadi Indoor Stadium, Tehran
Referees: Yuji Hirahara (JPN), Kim Jong-kuk (KOR), Mohammadreza Salehian (IRI)

14 September
10:00

Boxscore

Jordan	119–105	Philippines
Scoring by quarter: 32–20, 33–25, 34–25, 20–35
Pts: Tucker 37; Rebs: Hussein 13; Asts: Al-Awadi 5		Pts: Pessumal 30; Rebs: Belo 6 Asts: Perez 3

Azadi Indoor Stadium, Tehran
Referees: Yuji Hirahara (JPN), Kim Jong-kuk (KOR), Mohammadreza Salehian (IRI)

14 September
12:00

Boxscore

China	93–88	Chinese Taipei
Scoring by quarter: 23–18, 26–30, 21–15, 23–25
Pts: Hu 24; Rebs: Hu 11; Asts: Hu, Liu 3		Pts: Davis, Liu 19; Rebs: Chiang 9 Asts: Chou Y.H. 3

Azadi Indoor Stadium, Tehran
Referees: Hwang In-tae (KOR), Takaki Kato (JPN), Mohammad Doost (IRI)

14 September
16:00

Boxscore

Kazakhstan	90–100	India
Scoring by quarter: 21–19, 22–32, 28–20, 19–29
Pts: Yevstigneyev 30; Rebs: Yevstigneyev 8 Asts: Kuanov 4		Pts: T. Singh 32; Rebs: Amj. Singh 14; Asts: Amj. Singh 8

Azadi Indoor Stadium, Tehran
Referees: Ahmed Al-Suwaili (IRQ), Preeda Muongmee (THA), Hassan Nikkhah Gorshari (IRI)

=== Group F ===
Pos	Team	Pld	W	L	PF	PA	PD	Pts	Qualification
1	Iran (H)	5	5	0	442	245	+197	10	Final Round
2	South Korea	5	4	1	399	341	+58	9	Final Round
3	Japan	5	3	2	372	345	+27	8	Final Round
4	Iraq	5	2	3	369	386	−17	7	Final Round
5	Qatar	5	1	4	292	379	−87	6	
6	Thailand	5	0	5	282	460	−178	5	

Source: FIBA Asia
(H) Hosts

12 September
16:00

Boxscore

Iraq	65–67	Japan
Scoring by quarter: 8–13, 29–15, 15–20, 13–19
Pts: Galloway 15; Rebs: Galloway 11; Asts: Galloway 6		Pts: Furukawa 18; Rebs: Brown 18; Asts: three players 2

Azadi Indoor Stadium, Tehran
Referees: Ferdinand Pascual (PHI), Ahmed Al Bulushi (OMA), Mohammad Taha (JOR)

12 September
18:00

Boxscore

Iran	114–41	Thailand
Scoring by quarter: 34–17, 26–9, 23–11, 34–4
Pts: Arghavan 16; Rebs: Mirzaei 9 Asts: Jamshidi 7		Pts: Sunthonsiri 8 Rebs: Klahan 4 Asts: Korsah-dick, Sunthonsiri 2

Azadi Indoor Stadium, Tehran
Referees: Yevgeniy Mikheyev (KAZ), Alexey Stepanenko (KAZ), Yu Jung (TPE)

12 September
20:00

Boxscore

Qatar	60–86	South Korea
Scoring by quarter: 16–21, 9–21, 11–21, 24–23
Pts: Watson 18; Rebs: Erfan 6 Asts: Watson 3		Pts: Kim S.H., Lee J.H. 15; Rebs: Lee S.H. 8 Asts: Heo H., Kim J.K. 5

Azadi Indoor Stadium, Tehran
Referees: Rabah Noujaim (LIB), Harja Jaladri (INA), Reynaldo Yante (PHI)

13 September
14:00

Boxscore

Thailand	62–64	Qatar
Scoring by quarter: 16–28, 24–7, 8–16, 14–13
Pts: Muangboon 18; Rebs: Ghogar 8 Asts: Sunthonsiri 4		Pts: M. Mohamed, M. H. Mohamed 16; Rebs: Erfan 11; Asts: Watson 7

Azadi Indoor Stadium, Tehran
Referees: Harja Jaladri (INA), Yevgeniy Mikheyev (KAZ), Reynaldo Yante (PHI)

13 September
18:00

Boxscore

Japan	57–68	Iran
Scoring by quarter: 13–17, 13–20, 20–16, 11–15
Pts: Hiejima 14; Rebs: Brown 16; Asts: Hiejima 4		Pts: Haddadi 20; Rebs: Haddadi 14; Asts: five players 2

Azadi Indoor Stadium, Tehran
Referees: Ahmed Al Bulushi (OMA), Mohammad Taha (JOR), Yu Jung (TPE)

13 September
20:00

Boxscore

South Korea	102–80	Iraq
Scoring by quarter: 28–19, 23–17, 30–20, 21–24
Pts: Lee J.H. 22; Rebs: Choi 7 Asts: Cho, Kim S.H. 5		Pts: Galloway 22; Rebs: Talib 6 Asts: Galloway 5

Azadi Indoor Stadium, Tehran
Referees: Rabah Noujaim (LIB), Alexey Stepanenko (KAZ), Ferdinand Pascual (PHI)

14 September
14:00

Boxscore

Iraq	102–69	Thailand
Scoring by quarter: 25–16, 24–18, 25–16, 28–19
Pts: Galloway 37; Rebs: Galloway 13; Asts: Galloway 5		Pts: Jakrawan 14; Rebs: Klahan 6 Asts: Muangboon 5

Azadi Indoor Stadium, Tehran
Referees: Ahmed Al Bulushi (OMA), Harja Jaladri (INA), Reynaldo Yante (PHI)

14 September
18:00

Boxscore

Iran	85–47	South Korea
Scoring by quarter: 26–4, 16–17, 23–10, 20–16
Pts: Haddadi 29; Rebs: Haddadi 10; Asts: Jamshidi 5		Pts: Choi 15; Rebs: three players 4 Asts: Kim S.H. 3

Azadi Indoor Stadium, Tehran
Referees: Rabah Noujaim (LIB), Yevgeniy Mikheyev (KAZ), Yu Jung (TPE)

14 September
20:00

Boxscore

Qatar	65–79	Japan
Scoring by quarter: 12–20, 14–22, 18–11, 21–26
Pts: Saad 17; Rebs: Erfan 7 Asts: Saad 6		Pts: Shinoyama 16; Rebs: Brown, Furukawa 5 Asts: Hiejima 5

Azadi Indoor Stadium, Tehran
Referees: Ferdinand Pascual (PHI), Alexey Stepanenko (KAZ), Mohammad Taha (JOR)

== Final round ==
5th place game
E1	China	75
F3	Japan	67
7th place game
E3	Chinese Taipei	68
E4	India	80

5th–8th place semifinals
E1	China	88
E3	Chinese Taipei	66
F3	Japan	77
E4	India	66

Quarterfinals
E1	China	79
F4	Iraq	85
F2	South Korea	70
E3	Chinese Taipei	69
E2	Jordan	87
F3	Japan	80
F1	Iran	77
E4	India	47

Semifinals
F4	Iraq	72
F2	South Korea	78
E2	Jordan	63
F1	Iran	74

Final
South Korea	47
Iran	77
Bronze medal game
Iraq	72
Jordan	94

=== Quarterfinals ===
16 September
14:00

Boxscore

South Korea	70–69	Chinese Taipei
Scoring by quarter: 18–20, 24–18, 16–19, 12–12
Pts: Kim J.K. 22; Rebs: Heo I.Y., Kim J.K. 8 Asts: Kim S.H. 11		Pts: Davis 21; Rebs: Davis 12; Asts: Chou Y.H. 4

Azadi Basketball Hall, Tehran
Referees: Rabah Noujaim (LIB), Mohammad Doost (IRI), Yuji Hirahara (JPN)

16 September
16:15

Boxscore

Iraq	85–79	China
Scoring by quarter: 23–22, 16–21, 21–20, 25–16
Pts: Galloway 26; Rebs: Galloway 13; Asts: Galloway 8		Pts: Yuan 26; Rebs: Hu 7 Asts: Liu 8

Azadi Basketball Hall, Tehran
Referees: Ferdinand Pascual (PHI), Harja Jaladri (INA), Takaki Kato (JPN)

16 September
18:30

Boxscore

India	47–77	Iran
Scoring by quarter: 14–18, 17–20, 2–26, 14–13
Pts: Bhriguvanshi 14; Rebs: Y. Singh 8 Asts: Pari 3		Pts: Haddadi 17; Rebs: Haddadi 23; Asts: Haddadi 4

Azadi Basketball Hall, Tehran
Referees: Yevgeniy Mikheyev (KAZ), Ahmed Al-Suwaili (IRQ), Kim Jong-kuk (KOR)

16 September
20:45

Boxscore

Jordan	87–80	Japan
Scoring by quarter: 22–26, 23–15, 21–18, 21–21
Pts: Tucker 33; Rebs: Tucker 9 Asts: Tucker 7		Pts: Hiejima 17; Rebs: Brown 12; Asts: Shinoyama 4

Azadi Basketball Hall, Tehran
Referees: Ahmed Al Bulushi (OMA), Hwang In-tae (KOR), Yu Jung (TPE)

=== Classification 5th–8th ===
17 September
14:00

Boxscore

Chinese Taipei	66–88	China
Scoring by quarter: 7–15, 20–27, 21–34, 18–12
Pts: Davis 16; Rebs: Davis 7 Asts: Chou Y.H. 2		Pts: Fang 25; Rebs: Hu 17; Asts: four players 2

Azadi Indoor Stadium, Tehran
Referees: Yuji Hirahara (JPN), Kim Jong-kuk (KOR), Ahmed Al-Suwaili (IRQ)

17 September
16:15

Boxscore

Japan	77–66	India
Scoring by quarter: 22–14, 18–19, 20–18, 17–15
Pts: Brown 20; Rebs: Brown 14; Asts: Shinoyama 7		Pts: Amr. Singh 22; Rebs: Amr. Singh 14; Asts: Bhriguvanshi 5

Azadi Indoor Stadium, Tehran
Referees: Ahmed Al Bulushi (OMA), Mohammad Doost (IRI), Hwang In-tae (KOR)

=== Semifinals ===
17 September
18:30

Boxscore

Jordan	63–74	Iran
Scoring by quarter: 18–16, 10–19, 22–18, 13–21
Pts: Tucker 25; Rebs: Hussein 17; Asts: Al-Awadi, Abuwazaneh 2		Pts: Haddadi 26; Rebs: Haddadi 20; Asts: Jamshidi 4

Azadi Indoor Stadium, Tehran
Referees: Rabah Noujaim (LIB), Ferdinand Pascual (PHI), Alexey Stepanenko (KAZ)

17 September
20:45

Boxscore

South Korea	78–72	Iraq
Scoring by quarter: 19–18, 20–14, 13–22, 26–18
Pts: Lee S.H. 22; Rebs: Kim J.K. 9 Asts: Kim S.H. 9		Pts: Al-Khafaji 17; Rebs: Galloway 9 Asts: Galloway 8

Azadi Indoor Stadium, Tehran
Referees: Yevgeniy Mikheyev (KAZ), Harja Jaladri (INA), Yu Jung (TPE)

=== Seventh place game ===
18 September
14:00

Boxscore

Chinese Taipei	68–80	India
Scoring by quarter: 22–17, 10–16, 18–19, 18–28
Pts: Chiang 16; Rebs: Davis 15; Asts: Chou Y.H. 3		Pts: Bhriguvanshi 22; Rebs: Amr. Singh 13; Asts: Bhriguvanshi 4

Azadi Indoor Stadium, Tehran
Referees: Ahmed Al-Suwaili (IRQ), Mohammadreza Salehian (IRI), Reynaldo Yante (PHI)

=== Fifth place game ===
18 September
16:15

Boxscore

China	75–67	Japan
Scoring by quarter: 18–12, 16–15, 19–15, 22–25
Pts: Hu 18; Rebs: Hu 16; Asts: Liu 4		Pts: Hiejima 23; Rebs: Brown 11; Asts: Hiejima 4

Azadi Indoor Stadium, Tehran
Referees: Harja Jaladri (INA), Hwang In-tae (KOR), Alexey Stepanenko (KAZ)

=== Third place game ===
18 September
18:30

Boxscore

Jordan	94–72	Iraq
Scoring by quarter: 26–14, 22–15, 22–27, 24–16
Pts: Tucker 19; Rebs: Tucker 7 Asts: Eid 4		Pts: Galloway 12; Rebs: Galloway 9 Asts: Hamad 2

Azadi Indoor Stadium, Tehran
Referees: Ferdinand Pascual (PHI), Ahmed Al-Bulushi (OMA), Takaki Kato (JPN)

=== Final ===
18 September
20:45

Boxscore

Iran	77–47	South Korea
Scoring by quarter: 13–9, 17–11, 23–14, 24–13
Pts: Haddadi 20; Rebs: Haddadi 23; Asts: Jamshidi 7		Pts: Lee S.H. 13; Rebs: Lee S.H. 5 Asts: Kim S.H. 4

Azadi Indoor Stadium, Tehran
Referees: Rabah Noujaim (LIB), Yuji Hirahara (JPN), Yevgeniy Mikheyev (KAZ)

== Final rankings ==
Earned their respective sub-confederations an extra berth for the 2017 FIBA Asia Cup

Rank	Team	Record
1st place, gold medalist(s)	Iran	8–0
2nd place, silver medalist(s)	South Korea	6–2
3rd place, bronze medalist(s)	Jordan	6–2
4	Iraq	3–5
5	China	6–2
6	Japan	4–4
7	India	4–4
8	Chinese Taipei	3–5
9	Philippines	1–4
10	Qatar	1–4
11	Kazakhstan	0–5
12	Thailand	0–5

== Awards ==
2016 FIBA Asia Challenge champions

Iran
Third title

- Most Valuable Player – (Iran) Hamed Haddadi
- PG – (South Korea) Kim Sun-hyung
- SG – (Jordan) Dar Tucker
- SF – (Iran) Mohammad Jamshidi
- PF – (Iraq) Kevin Galloway
- C – (Iran) Hamed Haddadi
