= Shinoyama =

Shinoyama (written: 篠山) is a Japanese surname. Notable people with the surname include:

- Kishin Shinoyama (篠山 紀信, born 1940), Japanese photographer
- Ryusei Shinoyama (篠山 竜青, born 1988), Japanese basketball player
