= Abdusalam Abdurixit =

Chinese basketball player (born 1996)

No. 23 – Xinjiang Flying Tigers
- Position: Small forward
- League: CBA

Personal information
- Born: May 20, 1996 (age 30) Altay, Xinjiang, China
- Listed height: 2.03 m (6 ft 8 in)
- Listed weight: 85 kg (187 lb)

Career information
- NBA draft: 2018: undrafted
- Playing career: 2015–present

Career history
- 2015–present: Xinjiang Flying Tigers

Career highlights
- CBA MVP (2024); CBA champion (2017); CBA Most Improved Player (2019); FIBA Asia Champions Cup champion (2016)
Medals
Men's basketball
Representing China
Asian Games
Gold medal – first place	2018 Jakarta-Palembang

Abdusalam Abdurixit (Chinese: 阿不都沙拉木·阿不都热西提; pinyin: Ābùdūshālāmù·Ābùdūrèxītí; Uyghur: ئابدۇسالام ئابدۇرېشىت, romanized: Abdusalam Abdurëshit; born May 20, 1996) is a Chinese professional basketball player for the Xinjiang Flying Tigers of the Chinese Basketball Association (CBA).

"Abudushalamu Abudurexiti" is the Chinese Pinyin rendering of his name. His given name has been spelled as "Abdusalam" on the back of his Chinese national team jersey and his patronymic has been spelled as "Abdurixit" in English language materials distributed to the foreign media by China's national team.

== Professional career ==
After winning the national youth championship in 2014, Abdusalam began his professional career with the Xinjiang Flying Tigers in the 2015–16 season. In his first season, he averaged 4.0 points, 1.6 rebounds, and 0.5 assists in 7.3 minutes per game. He also helped his team win the 2016 FIBA Asia Champions Cup, scoring 19 points in the championship game against Al Riyadi.

Despite assuming a greater role in the 2016–17 season for the Flying Tigers, receiving 9.6 minutes per game and starting in 12 games, Abdusalam averaged 3.1 points, 1.6 rebounds, and 0.3 assists. In the 2017 CBA Playoffs his team won the CBA title with a 4–0 sweep of the Guangdong Southern Tigers in the Finals.

In the 2017–18 season, Abdusalam averaged 6.9 points, 4.1 rebounds, and 0.7 assists in 19.1 minutes per game. Despite limited production, he received workouts with NBA teams for the 2018 NBA draft in May 2018.

He joined the Golden State Warriors for the 2018 NBA Summer League.

== National team career ==
Abdusalam has played for the Chinese national team at 2019 FIBA World Cup qualification. On November 26, 2017, he recorded 15 points, seven rebounds, and three assists in a 92–81 win over South Korea. In December 2017, FIBA columnist Enzo Flojo named Abdusalam among the five best Asian power forwards who played at FIBA competitions in 2017.

Abdusalam was included in China's squad for the 2023 FIBA Basketball World Cup qualification.

== Personal life ==
Abdusalam is an ethnic Uyghur.
