= Coras de Nayarit =

Mexican basketball club

Coras de Nayarit is a basketball club based in Tepic, Nayarit, Mexico, that plays in the Circuito de Baloncesto de la Costa del Pacífico (CIBACOPA). Their home games are played at Gimnasio Estatal Niños Heroes.
