= Kevin Galloway =

Iraqi-American basketball player

Free agent
- Position: Guard / small forward

Personal information
- Born: May 23, 1988 (age 38) Fresno, California, U.S.
- Listed height: 6 ft 7 in (2.01 m)
- Listed weight: 215 lb (98 kg)

Career information
- High school: Sacramento (Sacramento, California)
- College: USC (2006–2007); College of Southern Idaho (2007–2008); Kentucky (2008–2009); Texas Southern (2010–2011)
- NBA draft: 2011: undrafted
- Playing career: 2011–present

Career history
- 2011–2012: Idaho Stampede
- 2012–2013: Hamamatsu Phoenix
- 2013–2014: Osaka Evessa
- 2014–2015: Apollon Patras
- 2015–2016: Al Gharafa Doha
- 2016–2017: Homenetmen
- 2017–2018: Faros Larissas
- 2018: Club Malvín
- 2018–2019: Al Riyadi
- 2019: Al-Arabi
- 2019: Al Riyadi
- 2019–2020: Al-Arabi
- 2020–2021: Al-Naft
- 2023–2024: Al-Difaa Al-Jawi

Career highlights
- First-team All-SWAC (2011)

Kevin Dwayne Galloway (born May 23, 1988) is an Iraqi-American professional basketball player.

== High school ==
Galloway attended Sacramento Charter High School, in Sacramento, California, where he played high school basketball.

== College career ==
Galloway played NCAA Division I college basketball at USC (2006–2007), the College of Southern Idaho (2007–2008), Kentucky (2008–2009), and Texas Southern (2010–2011).

== Professional career ==
Galloway began his pro career in the 2011–12 season, the NBA Development League's Idaho Stampede. In the 2014–15 season, he played with the Greek Basket League club Apollon Patras. In the 2015–16 season, he played with the Lebanese club Homenetmen Beirut B.C. till the end of 2016–17 season. In the 2017–18 season, he joined the Greek club Faros Larissas. He left Faros and joined Club Malvín of the Liga Uruguaya de Basketball. On October 4, 2018, Galloway came back to the Lebanese Basketball League, and he signed with Al Riyadi Beirut

== National team career ==
Galloway became a naturalized citizen of Iraq, and was a member of the senior Iraqi national basketball team at the 2016 FIBA Asia Challenge, in Tehran, Iran. He led the Iraqi team in points, rebounds, assists, and steals at the tournament.
