= Ira Brown =

American-born Japanese basketball player

Ira Brown アイラ・ブラウン
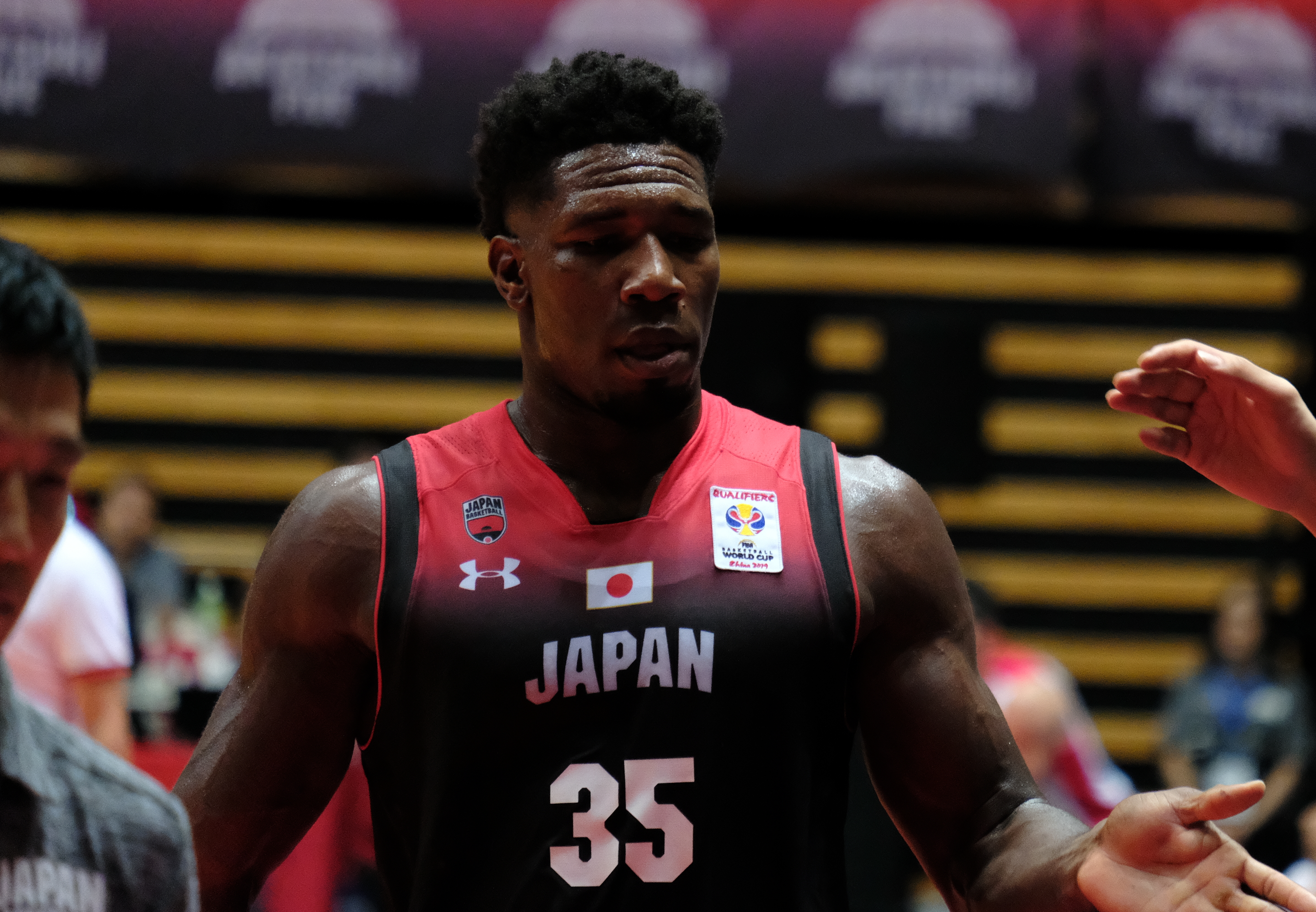

No. 50 – Rizing Zephyr Fukuoka
- Position: Power forward
- League: B.League

Personal information
- Born: August 3, 1982 (age 44) Corsicana, Texas, U.S.
- Listed height: 6 ft 4 in (1.93 m)
- Listed weight: 236 lb (107 kg)

Career information
- High school: Willis (Willis, Texas)
- College: Phoenix College (2005–2007); Gonzaga (2007–2009)
- NBA draft: 2009: undrafted
- Playing career: 2009–present

Career history
- 2010: Coras de Tepic
- 2010–2011: Asociación Española
- 2011: San Miguel Beermen
- 2011: Lagartos UAN de Tepic
- 2011–2014: Toyama Grouses
- 2014–2017: Sunrockers Shibuya
- 2017–2019: Ryukyu Golden Kings
- 2019–2023: Osaka Evessa
- 2023–2024: Chiba Jets Funabashi
- 2024: Hiroshima Dragonflies
- 2024–present: Rizing Zephyr Fukuoka

Career highlights
- 2x B.League Dunk Contest Winner (2017, 2018); bj league Best Five (2013); CIBACOPA All-Star (2010)
Medals
Men's basketball
Representing Japan
EABA Championship
Bronze medal – third place	2017 Nagano	Team

Ira Brown
- Pitcher
- Born: August 3, 1982 (age 44); Corsicana, Texas
- Bats: Right Throws: Right

Ira Demon Brown (born August 3, 1982) is a Japanese-American professional basketball player for the Rizing Zephyr Fukuoka of the Japanese B.League. He had also spent three years with the Hirachi/Shibuya Sunrockers, as well as two years with the Toyama Grouses during his career in Japan.

== Early life ==
Brown grew up in Corsicana, Texas, in a three-bedroom house along with "roughly 15 relatives." The house burned down in a fire, forcing him to relocate to another home, though he often stayed with friends. When he was 14 years old, Brown moved in with his former youth baseball coach, Earl Mitchell, in Conroe, Texas. He was eventually adopted by Mitchell.

== College career ==
Brown began his college career at Phoenix College before transferring to Gonzaga in 2007.

== Professional career ==
In 2010, Brown earned league all-star honors as a member of the Coras de Tepic of the Circuito de Baloncesto de la Costa del Pacífico (CIBACOPA).

On October 2, 2024, Brown signed with the Hiroshima Dragonflies of the B.League. On November 10, his contract was expired.

On November 14, 2024, Brown signed with the Rizing Zephyr Fukuoka.

=== The Basketball Tournament ===
Brown played for Team A Few Good Men in the 2018 edition of The Basketball Tournament. In two games, he averaged five points per game and 4.5 rebounds per game on 40 percent shooting. A Few Good Men made it to the Second Round before falling to Team Gael Force.

== National team career ==
He became a Japanese citizen after extensive language testing and a waiting period which took two years. As of 2018, he resides in Okinawa.

He was a member of Japan's national basketball team at the 2016 FIBA Asia Challenge in Tehran, Iran, where he recorded the most rebounds, steals and blocks for his team.

He played 3x3 basketball for Japan in the 2021 Olympics.

== Baseball career ==
Brown was drafted in 2001 by the Kansas City Royals, and played in the minors for five years.

== Career statistics ==
Legend
GP	Games played	GS	Games started	MPG	Minutes per game
FG%	Field goal percentage	3P%	3-point field goal percentage	FT%	Free throw percentage
RPG	Rebounds per game	APG	Assists per game	SPG	Steals per game
BPG	Blocks per game	PPG	Points per game	**Bold**	Career high

Year	Team	GP	GS	MPG	FG%	3P%	FT%	RPG	APG	SPG	BPG	PPG
2011–12	Toyama	52	52	30.6	.475	.323	.625	6.3	1.9	1.4	0.9	12.7
2012–13	Toyama	50	48	31.8	.537	.254	.658	9.1	3.2	2.0	1.2	16.5
2013–14	Toyama	52	52	34.2	.523	.419	.650	10.0	3.3	1.6	2.6	16.8
2014–15	Hitachi	54	45	27.8	.503	.364	.651	7.9	2.1	0.9	1.0	13.7
2015–16	Hitachi	54	50	29.3	.506	.214	.667	6.9	1.9	1.2	0.8	13.2
2016–17	Shibuya	57	44	29.3	.517	.358	.597	8.3	2.5	1.3	0.9	13.7
2017–18	Ryukyu	60	58	28.7	.490	.409	.614	7.0	2.9	1.3	0.8	11.2
