= Cui Jinming =

Chinese basketball player (born 1992)

Cui Jinming 崔晋铭
No. 5 – Jilin Northeast Tigers
- Position: Guard
- League: Chinese Basketball Association

Personal information
- Born: July 11, 1992 (age 34) Changchun, Jilin, China
- Listed height: 6 ft 4 in (1.93 m)

Career information
- Playing career: 2013–present

Career history
- 2013–present: Jilin Northeast Tigers

Cui Jinming (born July 11, 1992) is a Chinese professional basketball player.

== Career ==
Cui is a basketball player for the Jilin Northeast Tigers of the Chinese Basketball Association.

Cui represented China's national basketball team at the 2016 FIBA Asia Challenge in Tehran, Iran.
