= Liu Zhixuan =

Chinese basketball player

Liu Zhixuan 刘志轩
Personal information
- Born: January 7, 1991 (age 35) Yingkou, Liaoning, China
- Listed height: 196 cm (6 ft 5 in)
- Listed weight: 88 kg (194 lb)

Career information
- Playing career: 2012–2024
- Position: Shooting guard / small forward

Career history

Playing
- 2012–2022: Liaoning Flying Leopards
- 2022–2024: Jiangsu Dragons

Coaching
- 2024–2025: Liaoning Flying Leopards (assistant)

Career highlights
- 2× CBA Champion (2018) (2022)
Medals
Men's basketball
Representing China
Asian Games
Gold medal – first place	2018 Jakarta

Liu Zhixuan (Chinese: 刘志轩), born January 7, 1991) is a Chinese former professional basketball player of the Chinese Basketball Association (CBA). He represented China's national basketball team at the 2016 FIBA Asia Challenge in Tehran, Iran, where he recorded most assists for his team and was also the best 3 point and free throw shooter.
