= Zou Yuchen =

Chinese basketball player

Zou Yuchen 邹雨宸
No. 10 – Beijing Royal Fighters
- Position: Center
- League: Chinese Basketball Association

Personal information
- Born: July 5, 1996 (age 30) Anshan, Liaoning, China
- Listed height: 6 ft 10 in (2.08 m)
- Listed weight: 238 lb (108 kg)

Career information
- High school: Shenzhen Middle School
- College: Shenzhen Sports School
- Playing career: 2014–present

Career history
- 2014–2021: Bayi Rockets
- 2021–present: Beijing Royal Fighters

Career highlights
- CBA blocks leader (2017)
Medals
Men's basketball
Representing China
FIBA U18 Asian Championship
Gold medal – first place	2014 Doha

Zou Yuchen
- Traditional Chinese: 鄒雨宸
- Simplified Chinese: 邹雨宸
Transcriptions
Standard Mandarin
- Hanyu Pinyin: Zōu Yǔchén

Zou Yuchen (simplified Chinese: 邹雨宸; traditional Chinese: 鄒雨宸; pinyin: Zōu Yǔchén; born July 5, 1996) is a Chinese male professional basketball player who currently plays for Beijing Royal Fighters in the Chinese Basketball Association.

== Career ==
Zou Yuchen was born in Anshan, Liaoning to a basketball family. His parents were players from the Bayi Basketball Team, now known as the Bayi Rockets. While he was a child, Zou was bulkier than many of his peers and had the build of a basketball player. His family immigrated from Anshan to Zhuhai during his childhood, but there was not a professional basketball team in those days. Dai Yixin, the president of Shenzhen Sports School who once recruited Yi Jianlian to the school, introduced Zou to Shenzhen Sports School, but Zou's parents refused the offer. Dai requested that the famous basketball coach Ma Yuenan attempt to persuade Zou's parents. Finally, Zou's parents agreed that Zou would go to the sports school. Zou formally started his basketball career in September 2008.

Zou started as a member of the Juvenile Group in Liaoning's basketball team. In 2009, he became a member of Bayi Youth Basketball Team. In March 2016, he was chosen to play in China men's national basketball team at the 2016 Summer Olympics in Rio de Janeiro, Brazil.
