= Ferdinand Pascual =

Filipino basketball referee (born 1970)

- Born: July 30, 1970 (age 56)
- Education: University of Baguio
- Occupation: Basketball referee

Ferdinand "Bong" Pascual (born July 30, 1970) is a Filipino basketball referee who has officiated in the FIBA World Cup and the Summer Olympics. He also served as a referee for the UNTV Cup and the National Collegiate Athletic Association (NCAA).

== Early life and education ==
Pascual was born on July 30, 1970 He spent his early years in Cabanatuan. He was sent to Baguio to complete his education where he studied at the University of Baguio. He was part of the university's basketball team, the Cardinals. He obtained a commerce degree in the University and became a nursing aide prior to becoming a full-time referee. He has also considered pursuing a career in dentistry.

== Refereeing career ==
=== Domestic ===
Pascual also was a former referee at the Philippine Basketball Association who officiated from 2006 to 2012. He also served as a referee for the UNTV Cup and the National Collegiate Athletic Association (NCAA).

=== International ===
Pascual has been officiating FIBA-sanctioned basketball games since November 12, 2002. Pascual has officiated in various international competitions including the 2014 and 2019 FIBA World Cup. He officiated in a pre-Olympic tournament held prior to the 2008 Summer Olympics.

In 2016, Pascual was nominated by the FIBA as one of the officials that was to work in the 2016 Summer Olympics held at Rio de Janeiro, Brazil. Pascual is the second Filipino referee to officiate an Olympic basketball game, next to Medardo Felipe in the 1984 Olympic Games. He officiated games at the 2020 Summer Olympics in Tokyo, Japan held in 2021, despite not being able to officiate in the Olympic qualifier in Victoria, Canada due to logistics issue caused by the COVID-19 pandemic.

=== FIBA Basketball World Cup ===
Ferdinand Pascual first officiated in a FIBA Basketball World Cup in 2014. In that edition held in Spain, Pascual was the only Asian to officiate beyond the preliminary round and was involved in two matches: Lithuania's 76–71 victory over New Zealand in the Round of 16 and the United States' 119–76 quarterfinal win against Slovenia.

In the 2019 edition hosted in China, Pascual was one of the referees tasked to officiate games. Among the games he officiated are: The United States 93–92 overtime win against Turkey in the preliminaries, the United States' 69–53 victory over Greece in the second round, France 89–79 win over the United States in the quarterfinal, and the bronze medal match which saw France clinching third place by winning 67–59 over Australia.

== Personal life ==
Pascual is married and has three children.
