= Ryusei Shinoyama =

Japanese basketball player

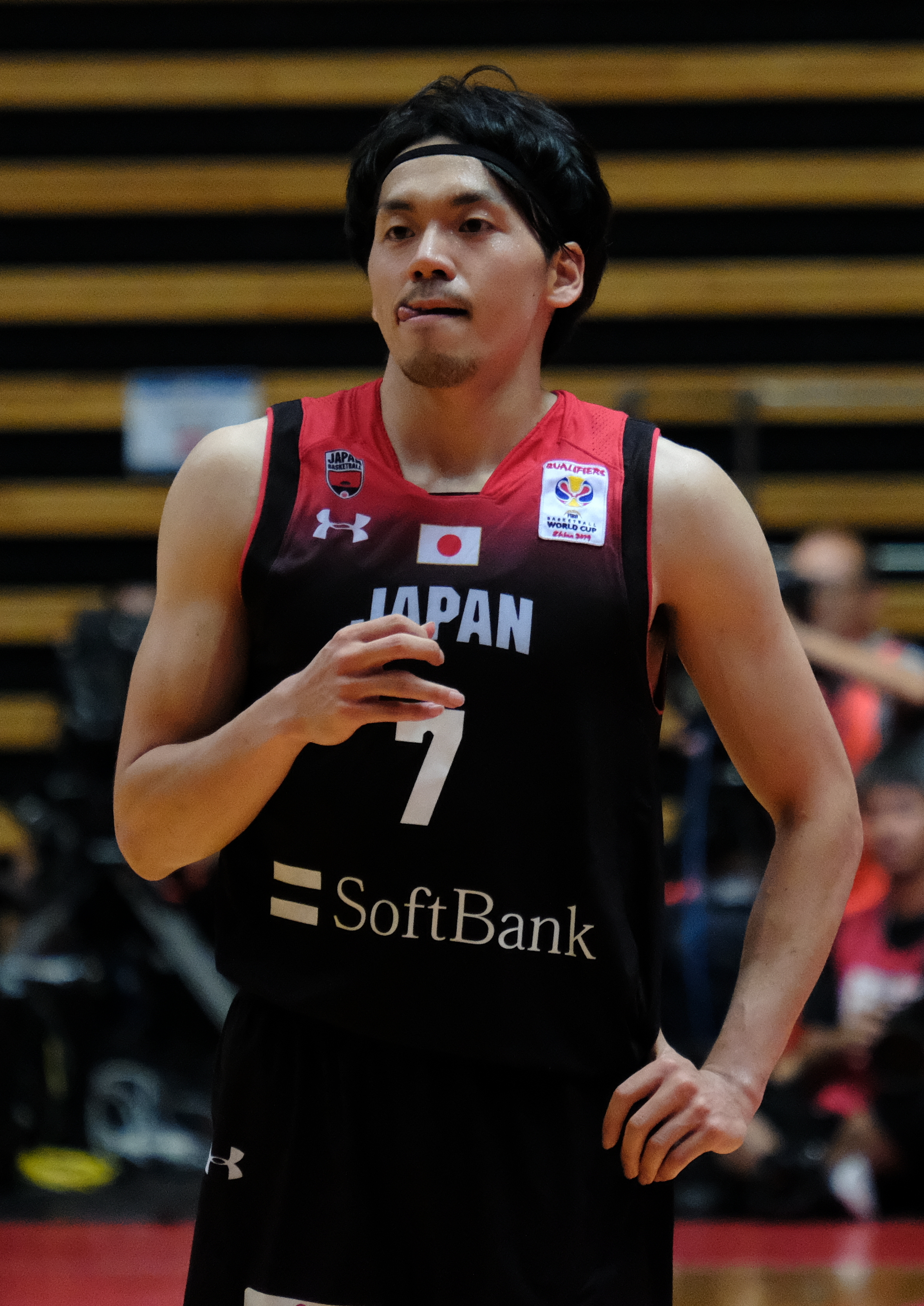

No. 7 – Kawasaki Brave Thunders
- Position: Point guard
- League: B.League

Personal information
- Born: July 20, 1988 (age 38) Aoba-ku, Yokohama. Kanagawa, Japan
- Listed height: 5 ft 10 in (1.78 m)
- Listed weight: 170 lb (77 kg)

Career information
- High school: Hokuriku
- College: Nihon University
- Playing career: 2011–present

Career history
- 2011–present: Kawasaki Brave Thunders

Career highlights
- B.League FT% Leader (2025)

Ryūsei Shinoyama (篠山 竜青, Shinoyama Ryūsei; born July 20, 1988 in Tokyo) is a Japanese professional basketball player for the Kawasaki Brave Thunders of the B.League.

He was a member of Japan's national basketball team at the 2016 FIBA Asia Challenge in Tehran, Iran, where he recorded most assists for Japan.

He is a member of Japan's national basketball team at the 2019 FIBA Basketball World Cup qualification (Asia).

== Career statistics ==
Legend
GP	Games played	GS	Games started	MPG	Minutes per game
FG%	Field goal percentage	3P%	3-point field goal percentage	FT%	Free throw percentage
RPG	Rebounds per game	APG	Assists per game	SPG	Steals per game
BPG	Blocks per game	PPG	Points per game	**Bold**	Career high

Year	Team	GP	GS	MPG	FG%	3P%	FT%	RPG	APG	SPG	BPG	TO	PPG
2011-12	Toshiba	36	25	23.1	.393	.374	.731	2.1	2.4	**1.1**	0	1.4	7.2
2012-13	Toshiba	42	42	26.7	.518	.477	.820	**2.4**	3.1	**1.1**	0.1	1.6	6.6
2013-14	Toshiba	49	44	22.7	**.525**	**.493**	.581	1.7	2.5	1.0	0.1	1.4	5.1
2014-15	Toshiba	19	17	22.0	.467	.417	**.833**	1.5	2.7	0.7	0	**1.0**	5.0
2015-16	Toshiba	51	36	21.4	.476	.324	.810	1.6	2.5	**1.1**	0.1	1.7	4.3
2016-17	Kawasaki	**60**	**60**	22.6	.477	.299	.671	0.8	3.3	0.9	**0.2**	1.3	7.5
2017-18	Kawasaki	56	51	23.1	.471	.361	.783	2.0	3.7	0.9	0.1	1.6	8.5
2018-19	Kawasaki	**60**	52	**26.8**	.490	.412	.809	1.8	4.6	0.8	0.1	1.3	**9.0**
2019-20	Kawasaki	27	25	22.2	.494	.326	.745	1.8	**4.7**	1.0	0.1	1.8	8.3
2020-21	Kawasaki	59	33	20.0	.454	.337	.700	1.3	**4.7**	0.7	0.1	1.2	5.9
2021-22	Kawasaki	55	14	17.8	.443	.330	.757	1.2	3.8	0.7	0.1	1.2	5.4
2022-23	Kawasaki	28	2	16.2	.403	.361	.688	1.4	2.8	0.5	0.0	1.2	4.9
Career		542	401	22.1	.469	.371	.740	1.7	3.5	0.9	0.1	1.4	6.6
