= Lee Seoung-hyun =

South Korean basketball player

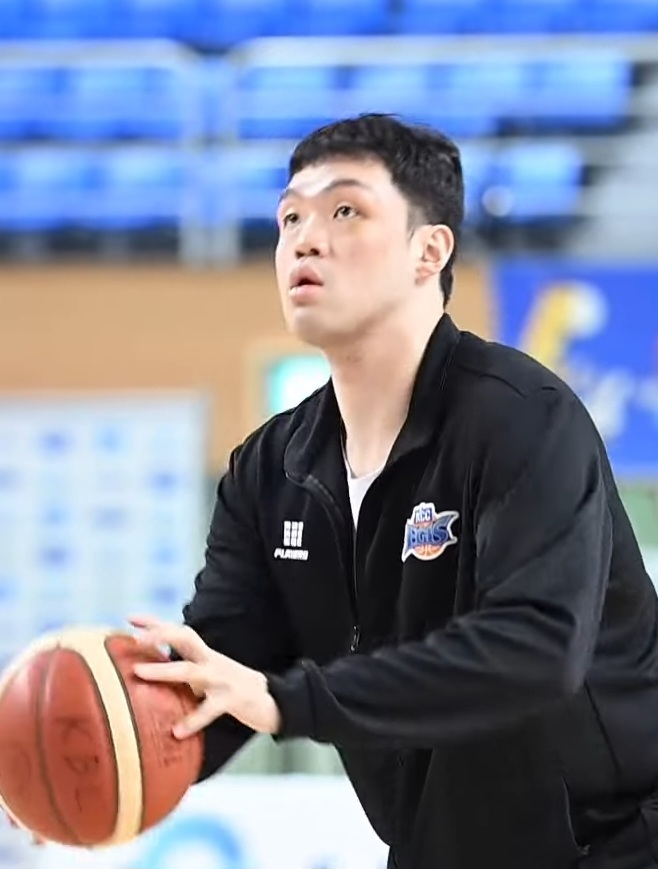

No. 33 – Jeonju KCC Egis
- Position: Power forward
- League: KBL

Personal information
- Born: April 16, 1992 (age 34) Gumi, North Gyeongsang, South Korea
- Listed height: 6 ft 6 in (1.98 m)

Career information
- College: Korea University
- KBL draft: 2014: 1st round, 1st overall pick
- Playing career: 2014–present

Career history
- 2014–2022: Goyang Orion Orions
- 2022–present: Jeonju KCC Egis

- Lee Seoung-hyun
- Hangul: 이승현
- RR: I Seunghyeon
- MR: I Sŭnghyŏn

Lee Seoung-hyun (Korean: 이승현; born April 16, 1992) is a South Korean professional basketball player for the Jeonju KCC Egis of the Korean Basketball League.

He represented South Korea's national basketball team at the 2016 FIBA Asia Challenge, where he recorded most minutes for his team.
