= Takatoshi Furukawa =

Japanese basketball player (born 1987)

Takatoshi Furukawa 古川孝敏
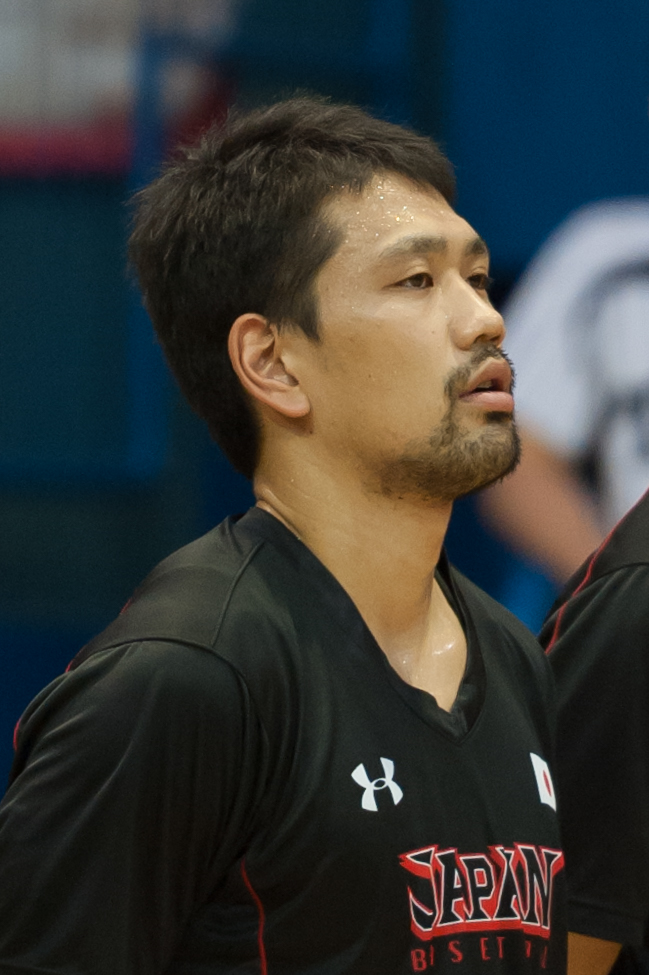
- Furukawa with national team in 2015

No. 51 – Akita Northern Happinets
- Position: Shooting guard
- League: B.League

Personal information
- Born: October 20, 1987 (age 39) Tokyo, Japan
- Listed height: 6 ft 3 in (1.91 m)
- Listed weight: 198 lb (90 kg)

Career information
- High school: Mikage Technical
- College: Tokai University

Career history
- 2010–2013: Aisin SeaHorses Mikawa
- 2013–2017: Link Tochigi Brex
- 2017–2019: Ryukyu Golden Kings
- 2019–present: Akita Northern Happinets

Career highlights
- JBL 3point pct Leader (2011–12); 2× NBL Free Throw pct leader (2014, 16); B.League Finals MVP (2016–17); 2× JBL All-star (2012,13); B.League All-star (2018); B.League Finals MVP (2017); B.League Free Throw pct leader (2020–21)
Medals
Men's basketball
Representing Japan
Asian Games
Bronze medal – third place	2014 South Korea	Team competition

Takatoshi Furukawa (born October 20, 1987) is a Japanese professional basketball player who currently plays for Akita Northern Happinets in the B.League.

He was a member of the Japan national basketball team that competed in the 2015 FIBA Asia Championship. As a member of Team Japan, he is especially known for his outside shooting.

== Akita Northern Happinets ==
Furukawa accepted a three-year contract for Akita Happinets on June 11, 2019. He became the first Happinets player to lead the B.League in free throw percentage in 2021.

== Career statistics ==
Legend
GP	Games played	GS	Games started	MPG	Minutes per game
FG%	Field goal percentage	3P%	3-point field goal percentage	FT%	Free throw percentage
RPG	Rebounds per game	APG	Assists per game	SPG	Steals per game
BPG	Blocks per game	PPG	Points per game	**Bold**	Career high

†	Denotes seasons in which Furukawa won an championship
*	Led the league

=== Regular season ===
Year	Team	GP	GS	MPG	FG%	3P%	FT%	RPG	APG	SPG	BPG	PPG
2010-11	Aisin	36		17.9	.381	.337	.812	1.4	0.6	0.2	0.1	5.4
2011-12	Aisin	42	42	31.5	.441	.446*	.870	2.2	1.0	0.5	0.0	11.1
2012-13†	Aisin	38	38	29.5	.375	.359	.829	1.9	0.8	0.4	0.2	8.9
2013-14	Tochigi	51	50	27.4	.422	.353	.905*	2.3	1.1	0.4	0.0	11.4
2014-15	Tochigi	54	54	26.7	.466	.431	.846	2.1	0.9	0.4	0.1	13.1
2015-16	Tochigi	54	54	28.8	.452	.391	.893*	2.6	1.0	0.7	0.1	15.7
2016-17†	Tochigi	48	44	22.8	.411	.374	.891	1.6	0.8	0.6	0.1	11.1
2017-18	Ryukyu	49	27	22.5	.388	.362	.835	2.3	1.5	0.4	0.1	9.6
2018-19	Ryukyu	54	54	28.4	.417	.355	.890	2.6	1.1	0.5	0.2	10.5
2019-20	Akita	30	29	25.3	.325	.301	.868	2.2	1.8	0.4	0.1	8.7
2020-21	Akita	54	46	23.8	.423	.393	.910*	2.1	1.7	0.6	0.0	10.0

=== Playoffs ===
Year	Team	GP	GS	MPG	FG%	3P%	FT%	RPG	APG	SPG	BPG	PPG
2011-12	Aisin	7		31.1	.305	.282	.750	2.6	1.0	0.7	0.0	7.1
2012-13	Aisin	7		32.7	.397	.440	.900	2.4	1.1	0.0	0.1	10.0
2013-14	Tochigi	3		29.0	.432	.444	1.000	2.0	1.7	1.3	0.0	15.0
2014-15	Tochigi	4		31.0	.420	.313	.895	4.3	1.0	1.0	0.3	16.0
2015-16	Tochigi	5		32.2	.368	.359	.923	3.2	1.2	0.8	0.0	16.4
2016-17	Tochigi	6	6	23:52	.446	.458	.778	1.8	1.2	0.33	0.0	11.3
2017-18	Ryukyu	5	5	24:43	.286	.208	1.000	2.8	0.8	0.0	0.2	9.0
2018-19	Ryukyu	6	6	25:08	.348	.375	.800	2.2	0.8	0.0	0.0	7.0

=== Early cup games ===
Year	Team	GP	GS	MPG	FG%	3P%	FT%	RPG	APG	SPG	BPG	PPG
2018	Ryukyu	2	2	21:49	.462	.143	1.000	3.5	0.0	1.0	0.0	9.0
2019	Akita	1	1	20:05	.500	.000	.750	1.0	0.0	0.0	0.0	11.0

=== Preseason games ===
Year	Team	GP	GS	MPG	FG%	3P%	FT%	RPG	APG	SPG	BPG	PPG
2019	Akita	3	3	21.0	.412	.500	.571	1.3	1.0	0.3	0.0	7.3

Source: UtsunomiyaToyamaSendai

=== Non-FIBA events stats ===
Year	Team	GP	GS	MPG	FG%	3P%	FT%	RPG	APG	SPG	BPG	PPG
2011	Universiade	8		16.36	.414	.412	1.000	3.0	0.9	0.4	0.0	8.4

=== FIBA Senior team events stats ===
Year	Team	GP	GS	MPG	FG%	3P%	FT%	RPG	APG	SPG	BPG	PPG
2015	FIBA Asia Cup	9		19.54	.374	.288	.737	2.8	0.3	0.4	0.0	10.8
2016	Olympic Qualifier - Serbia	2		9.46	.000	.000	.000	2.5	0.0	0.0	0.0	0.0
2017	FIBA Asia Cup	4		13.28	.611	.545	.750	0.2	0.5	0.2	0.0	7.8
2017	Asian World Cup Qualifier	7		7.31	.105	.077	1.000	1.3	0.1	0.0	0.0	1.1

=== William Jones Cup ===
Year	Team	GP	GS	MPG	FG%	3P%	FT%	RPG	APG	SPG	BPG	PPG
2012	Japan	8		21	.409	.395	1.000	1.9	0.9	0.6	0.0	9.9
2014	Japan	9		22	.413	.419	.900	1.6	0.9	0.4	0.0	8.2
2015	Japan	6		26	.426	.452	1.000	3.2	1.2	0.7	0.0	11.0
Career		23		23	.414	.419	.962	2.1	1.0	0.6	0.0	9.5

=== Terrific 12 ===
Year	Team	GP	GS	MPG	FG%	3P%	FT%	RPG	APG	SPG	BPG	PPG
2018	Ryukyu	4		23.7				5.0	1.0	0.3	0.0	8.5
