= Fang Shuo =

Chinese basketball player (born 1990)

Changsha Yongsheng
- Position: Combo guard
- League: NBL

Personal information
- Born: 7 September 1990 (age 36) Beijing, China
- Listed height: 1.88 m (6 ft 2 in)
- Listed weight: 82 kg (181 lb)

Career information
- NBA draft: 2019: undrafted
- Playing career: 2008–present

Career history
- 2008–2026: Beijing Ducks
- 2026–present: Changsha Yongsheng

Career highlights
- CBA champion (2012)
Medals
Men's basketball
Representing China
Asian Games
Gold medal – first place	2018 Jakarta

Fang Shuo (Chinese: 方硕; born September 7, 1990) is a Chinese professional basketball player for Changsha Yongsheng of the Chinese National Basketball League (NBL). He is a point guard by position, and has represented China internationally, being included in the squad for the 2019 FIBA Basketball World Cup. On 14 August 2026, Fang left the Beijing Ducks and joined Changsha Yongsheng.
