= Makoto Hiejima =

Japanese basketball player (born 1990)

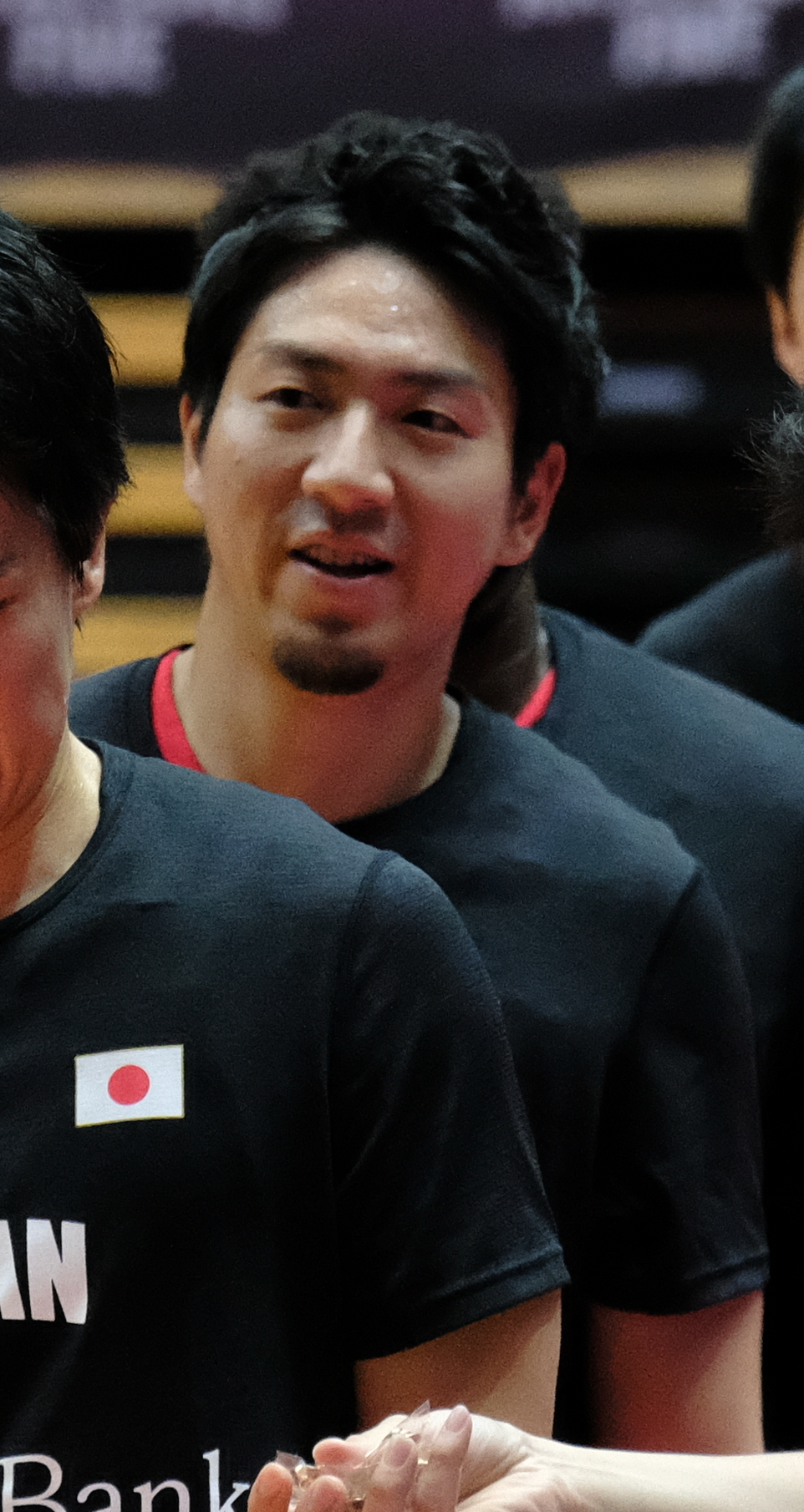
- Hiejima in September 2018

No. 6 – Utsunomiya Brex
- Position: Shooting guard
- League: B.League

Personal information
- Born: August 11, 1990 (age 36) Fukuoka, Japan
- Listed height: 191 cm (6 ft 3 in)
- Listed weight: 88 kg (194 lb)

Career information
- High school: Rakunan (Kyoto, Japan)
- College: Aoyama Gakuin University
- NBA draft: 2012: undrafted
- Playing career: 2013–present

Career history
- 2013–2018: Aisin SeaHorses Mikawa
- 2018–2019: Brisbane Bullets
- 2019–present: Utsunomiya Brex

Career highlights
- EASL Champion (2026); EASL Finals MVP (2026); BCL Asia Champion (2025); Japanese B.League MVP (2018); Japanese NBL champion (2015); Japanese B.League Champion (2022 2025); B.League 3FG% Leader (2025); Japanese NBL Rookie of the Year (2014)
Medals
Men's basketball
Representing Japan
Asian Games
| Bronze medal – third place | 2014 South Korea | Team competition |
EABA Championship
| Bronze medal – third place | 2017 Nagano | Team |

Makoto Hiejima (Japanese: 比江島慎; born August 11, 1990) is a Japanese professional basketball player for Utsunomiya Brex of the Japanese B.League.

== Professional career ==
A Fukuoka Prefecture native and Rakunan High School alum, Hiejima attended Aoyama Gakuin University before making his pro debut with the Aisin SeaHorses Mikawa in 2013. He played a pivotal role in helping the rebranded SeaHorses Mikawa win the B.League West Division (46–14) in 2016–17 in the circuit's inaugural campaign and finish first in the Central Division (48–12) in 2017–18, when he was named league MVP behind averages of 12.9 points, 4.1 assists and 2.9 rebounds in 55 games.

In July 2018, Hiejima signed a five-year deal with Link Tochigi Brex. As part of his deal with the Brex, he was free to pursue higher-level opportunities elsewhere and return to Tochigi at any time. The following month, he signed with the Brisbane Bullets of the Australian NBL under the league's Asian Player rule. On January 5, 2019, he was released by the Bullets. Four days later, he joined Link Tochigi Brex for the rest of the season.

== National team career ==
In 2013, Hiejima made his international debut for Japan at the FIBA Asia Championship. In 2014, he helped Japan win bronze at the Asian Games.

== Career statistics ==
Legend
| GP | Games played | GS | Games started | MPG | Minutes per game |
| FG% | Field goal percentage | 3P% | 3-point field goal percentage | FT% | Free throw percentage |
| RPG | Rebounds per game | APG | Assists per game | SPG | Steals per game |
| BPG | Blocks per game | PPG | Points per game | **Bold** | Career high |

| † | Denotes seasons in which Hiejima won a championship |

| Year | Team | GP | GS | MPG | FG% | 3P% | FT% | RPG | APG | SPG | BPG | PPG |
|---|---|---|---|---|---|---|---|---|---|---|---|---|
| 2013–14 | Aisin | 53 | 5 | 30.4 | .501 | .462 | .762 | 3.1 | 2.9 | 1.1 | .3 | 11.8 |
| 2014–15† | Aisin | 42 | 36 | 29.3 | .466 | .294 | .738 | 2.9 | 3.0 | 1.3 | .3 | 10.2 |
| 2015–16 | Aisin | 51 | 51 | 32.6 | .493 | .369 | .771 | 3.2 | 2.9 | 1.3 | .4 | 14.3 |
| 2016–17 | Mikawa | 59 | 55 | 29.1 | .474 | .420 | .769 | 3.1 | 3.4 | 1.2 | .4 | 12.9 |
| 2017–18 | Mikawa | 55 | 44 | 25.9 | .505 | .395 | .760 | 2.9 | 4.1 | 1.2 | .5 | 12.9 |
| 2018–19 | Brisbane | 3 | 0 | .6 | .000 | .000 | .000 | .0 | .0 | .0 | .0 | .0 |
| 2018–19 | Utsunomiya | 29 | 7 | 23.3 | .502 | .429 | .653 | 2.2 | 3.5 | 1.1 | .5 | 9.9 |
| 2019–20 | Utsunomiya | 40 | 39 | 24.3 | .457 | .352 | .793 | 2.1 | 3.5 | 1.0 | .4 | 10.0 |
| 2020–21 | Utsunomiya | 42 | 20 | 18.9 | .479 | .342 | .744 | 1.5 | 2.3 | 0.7 | .2 | 8.4 |
| 2021–22† | Utsunomiya | 51 | 51 | 22.0 | .494 | .420 | .710 | 2.2 | 3.7 | 1.1 | .4 | 11.5 |
