= 2016 Philippines men's national basketball team results =

The Philippines national basketball team, led by head coach Tab Baldwin, participated at one of the three the FIBA World Olympic Qualifying Tournaments which was hosted at home after failing to win the final against China at the 2015 FIBA Asia Championship where the champion automatically qualified for the 2016 Summer Olympics.

The Gilas Cadets led by head coach Nash Racela participated at the regional 2016 SEABA Cup.

== Record ==
| Competition | GP | W | L |
|---|---|---|---|
| 2016 FIBA World Olympic Qualifying Tournament | 2 | 0 | 2 |
| FIBA Asia Challenge | 5 | 1 | 4 |
| SEABA Cup | 5 | 5 | 0 |
| Imperial Basketball City Tournament | 2 | 1 | 1 |

== Uniforms ==
Until July 2016, September 2016 onwards
| Philippines 1st Uniform | Philippines 2nd Uniform |

2016 FIBA World Olympic Qualifying Tournament
| Philippines 1st Uniform | Philippines 2nd Uniform |

The national team adopted a new uniform for the 2016 FIBA World Olympic Qualifying Tournament in July 2016. At the 2016 FIBA Asia Challenge, the national team used the old uniform once again.

== Tournaments ==
=== SEABA Cup ===
==== Preliminary round ====
22 May
17:30 (UTC+7)

Stats

| Philippines | 108–84 | Malaysia |
Scoring by quarter: 29–20, 23–20, 28–20, 28–24
| Pts: Rosario 19; Rebs: Jose 15; Asts: Tolomia 4 | | Pts: Wong Y.H. 22; Rebs: Kwaan Y.J. 11; Asts: Kwaan Y.J. 4 |

Stadium 29, Bangkok
Referees: Ceciline Michael Vino Vincent Francis Victor (IND), Harja Jaladri (INA), Preeda Muongmee (THA)

24 May
16:00 (UTC+7)

Stats

| Singapore | 59–81 | Philippines |
Scoring by quarter: 14–27, 15–14, 12–18, 18–22
| Pts: Goh 17; Rebs: Toh Q.H. 9 Asts: Goh 3 | | Pts: Jalalon 17; Rebs: Jose, Rosario 9 Asts: Rosario, Tolomia 4 |

Stadium 29, Bangkok
Referees: Yu Jung (TPE), Suebpong Wichaiphin (THA), Ting Pick Kieng (MAS)

25 May
16:00 (UTC+7)

Stats

| Philippines | 83–52 | Indonesia |
Scoring by quarter: 25–16, 16–10, 19–17, 23–9
| Pts: Pogoy, Tolomia 12; Rebs: Holmqvist, Rosario 9 Asts: Jalalon, Tolomia 7 | | Pts: Surliyadin 12; Rebs: Wardana 9 Asts: Surliyadin 5 |

Stadium 29, Bangkok
Referees: Ceciline Michael Vino Vincent Francis Victor (IND), Wu Xin (SIN), Suebpong Wichaiphin (THA)

26 May
18:30 (UTC+7)

Stats

| Thailand | 65–66 | Philippines |
Scoring by quarter: 12–21, 21–11, 15–17, 17–17
| Pts: Ananti 14; Rebs: Chanthachon 13; Asts: Chanthachon, Samerjai 2 | | Pts: Rosario 20; Rebs: Jose 12; Asts: Jalalon 3 |

Stadium 29, Bangkok
Referees: Ceciline Michael Vino Vincent Francis Victor (IND), Harja Jaladri (INA), Ting Pick Kieng (MAS)

==== Final ====
28 May
15:00 (UTC+7)

Stats

| Thailand | 80–97 | Philippines |
Scoring by quarter: 22–22, 23–27, 17–18, 18–30
| Pts: Ananti 19; Rebs: Chanthachon 8 Asts: Samerjai 4 | | Pts: Rosario 17; Rebs: four players 7 each Asts: Jalalon, Rosario 3 |

Stadium 29, Bangkok
Referees: Yu Jung (TPE), Ceciline Michael Vino Vincent Francis Victor (IND), Wu Xin (SIN)

=== Imperial Basketball City Tournament ===
==== Semifinal ====
25 June
20:30 (UTC+2)

Report

| Italy | 106–70 | Philippines |
Scoring by quarter: 40–7, 24–16, 24–27, 18–20
| Pts: Gallinari 20; Rebs: Aradori 7 Asts: Hackett 5 | | Pts: Blatche 21; Rebs: Blatche 6 Asts: Blatche 4 |

Land Rover Arena, Bologna
Referees: Alessandro Vicino (ITA), Luca Weidmann (ITA), Federico Di Francesco (ITA)

==== Third place game ====
26 June
18:00 (UTC+2)

Report

| China | 69–72 | Philippines |
Scoring by quarter: 23–22, 11–12, 17–20, 18–18
| Pts: Zhou P. 18; Rebs: Zhou P. 10; Asts: Li G., Zhou P. 4 | | Pts: Romeo 18; Rebs: Blatche 12; Asts: Blatche, Chan, Parks Jr. 2 |

Land Rover Arena, Bologna
Referees: Gianluca Mattioli (ITA), Alessandro Martolini (ITA), Federico Di Francesco (ITA)

=== FIBA World Olympic Qualifying Tournament ===
5 July
21:00 (UTC+8)

Boxscore

| France | 93–84 | Philippines |
Scoring by quarter: 22–30, 23–13, 32–23, 16–18
| Pts: De Colo 27; Rebs: Diaw 9 Asts: Diaw, Parker 6 | | Pts: Blatche 21; Rebs: Rosario 9 Asts: William 3 |

Mall of Asia Arena, Pasay
Attendance: 15,000
Referees: Luigi Lamonica (ITA), Michael Aylen (AUS), Elias Koromilas (GRE)

6 July
21:00 (UTC+8)

Boxscore

| Philippines | 80–89 | New Zealand |
Scoring by quarter: 17–21, 14–17, 22–22, 27–29
| Pts: Blatche 30; Rebs: Blatche, Norwood 7 Asts: Norwood, William 3 | | Pts: T. Webster 25; Rebs: T. Webster 11; Asts: Ili 4 |

Mall of Asia Arena, Pasay
Attendance: 13,000
Referees: Saša Pukl (SLO), Elias Koromilas (GRE), Miguel Pérez (ESP)

=== FIBA Asia Challenge ===
==== Preliminary round ====
9 September
20:45 (UTC+4:30)

Boxscore

| Philippines | 83–91 | India |
Scoring by quarter: 25–16, 21–31, 12–21, 25–23
| Pts: Belo 21; Rebs: Daquioag 7 Asts: Daquioag 3 | | Pts: Amj. Singh 24; Rebs: Amj. Singh 18; Asts: Amr. Singh 5 |

Azadi Basketball Hall, Tehran
Referees: Hwang In-tae (KOR), Ahmed Al-Suwaili (IRQ), Mohammad Doost (IRI)

11 September
16:15 (UTC+4:30)

Boxscore

| Chinese Taipei | 87–76 | Philippines |
Scoring by quarter: 17–24, 21–19, 24–19, 25–14
| Pts: Davis 19; Rebs: Davis 16; Asts: Davis 5 | | Pts: Belo 17; Rebs: Van Opstal 8 Asts: Ferrer 3 |

Azadi Basketball Hall, Tehran
Referees: Yuji Hirahara (JPN), Hwang In-tae (KOR), Mohammadreza Salehian (IRI)

==== Second round ====
12 September
12:00 (UTC+4:30)

Boxscore

| China | 75–65 | Philippines |
Scoring by quarter: 18–14, 21–12, 18–25, 18–14
| Pts: Hu 21; Rebs: Zou 13; Asts: Cui, Liu 3 | | Pts: Belo 16; Rebs: Belo 7 Asts: 5 players 2 each |

Azadi Basketball Hall, Tehran
Referees: Ahmed Al-Suwaili (IRQ), Kim Jong-kuk (KOR), Mohammadreza Salehian (IRI)

13 September
10:00 (UTC+4:30)

Boxscore

| Philippines | 98–86 | Kazakhstan |
Scoring by quarter: 27–15, 20–22, 23–29, 28–20
| Pts: Belo 30; Rebs: Belo 11; Asts: Daquioag 4 | | Pts: Yevstigneyev 23; Rebs: Bazhkin 18; Asts: Ilin 3 |

Azadi Basketball Hall, Tehran
Referees: Hwang In-tae (KOR), Takaki Kato (JPN), Mohammad Doost (IRI)

14 September
10:00 (UTC+4:30)

Boxscore

| Jordan | 119–105 | Philippines |
Scoring by quarter: 32–20, 33–25, 34–25, 20–35
| Pts: Tucker 37; Rebs: Hussein 13; Asts: Al-Awadi 5 | | Pts: Pessumal 30; Rebs: Belo 6 Asts: Perez 3 |

Azadi Basketball Hall, Tehran
Referees: Yuji Hirahara (JPN), Kim Jong-kuk (KOR), Mohammadreza Salehian (IRI)

== Exhibition games ==
7 June
18:00 (UTC+8)

Report

| Philippines | 71–64 (Note: The match followed a modified format with the score of both teams reverted to 0 after the end of each quarter. The scores of both teams would be 71–64 if the scores in all four quarters were add up.) | Iran |
Scoring by quarter: 21–13, 15–16, 17–16, 18–19

Gatorade Hoops Center, Mandaluyong
Attendance: 0 (Note: The match was played behind closed doors.)

8 June
19:00 (UTC+8)

Report

| Philippines | 81–70 | Iran |
Scoring by quarter: 29–15, 19–23, 19–12, 14–20
| Pts: Blatche 20; Rebs: Blatche 11; Asts: William 6 | | Pts: Yakhchali 16; Rebs: Hassanzadeh 10; Asts: Jamshidi 7 |

Smart Araneta Coliseum, Quezon City
Referees: Ariel Bermeo (PHI), Ricor Buaron (PHI), Jonard Garcia (PHI)

21 June
20:15 (UTC+3)

Report 1, 2

| Turkey | 103–68 | Philippines |
Scoring by quarter: 30–19, 27–13, 24–21, 22–15
| Pts: Erden 16 | | Pts: Blatche 23 |

Abdi İpekçi Arena, Istanbul

1 July
19:00 (UTC+8)

| Turkey | 84–76 | Philippines |
Scoring by quarter: 19–20, 21–13, 25–20, 19–23
| Pts: Mohammed 16 | | Pts: Blatche 20 |

Mall of Asia Arena, Pasay

== Rosters ==
=== SEABA Cup ===
The following was the roster for the 2016 SEABA Cup.

Philippines men's national basketball team - 2016 SEABA Cup roster
Players
Coaches

| Pos. | No. | Name | Age – Date of birth | Height | Club | Ctr. |
|---|---|---|---|---|---|---|
| G | 5 | Almond Vosotros | 26 – 26 January 1990 | 1.78 m (5 ft 10 in) | Blackwater Elite | (Philippines) |
| G | 6 | Jio Jalalon | – | 1.78 m (5 ft 10 in) | Racal Tile Masters | (Philippines) |
| F | 8 | Russel Escoto | – | 1.98 m (6 ft 6 in) | Phoenix Petroleum Accelerators | (Philippines) |
| F | 9 | Raymar Jose | – | 1.93 m (6 ft 4 in) | Phoenix Petroleum Accelerators | (Philippines) |
| F | 12 | Mac Belo | 23 – 12 February 1993 | 1.93 m (6 ft 4 in) | Phoenix Petroleum Accelerators | (Philippines) |
| G | 13 | Mike Tolomia | – | 1.80 m (5 ft 11 in) | Phoenix Petroleum Accelerators | (Philippines) |
| G | 14 | Kevin Ferrer | 23 – 26 March 1993 | 1.93 m (6 ft 4 in) | Mighty Sports | (Philippines) |
| F | 15 | Jonas Tibayan | 17 – 27 January 1999 | 1.82 m (6 ft 0 in) | Chiang Kai Shek College | (Philippines) |
| G/F | 16 | Roger Pogoy | 23 – 16 June 1992 | 1.91 m (6 ft 3 in) | Phoenix Petroleum Accelerators | (Philippines) |
| F | 18 | Troy Rosario (C) | 24 – 20 January 1992 | 2.01 m (6 ft 7 in) | Tropang TNT | (Philippines) |
| F | 19 | Von Pessumal | 23 – 12 February 1993 | 1.88 m (6 ft 2 in) | Tanduay Light Rhum Masters | (Philippines) |
| C | 20 | Ken Holmqvist | – | 2.03 m (6 ft 8 in) | Far Eastern University | (Philippines) |

Head coach

- (Philippines) Nash Racela (Note: Racela was the head coach of the national team that participate dat the 2016 SEABA Cup. Baldwin remains the coach of the team that will participate at the 2016 FIBA World Olympic Qualifying Tournament in Manila.)

Assistant coaches

- (Philippines) Michael Oliver
- (Philippines) Joshua Vincent Racela

Legend

- (C) Team captain
- Club – describes last
  club before the tournament
- Age – describes age
  on 22 May 2016

=== FIBA World Olympic qualifying tournament ===
The following was the 12-man roster of the Philippines national team for the 2016 FIBA World Olympic Qualifying Tournament.

Philippines men's national basketball team - 2016 FIBA World Olympic Qualifying Tournament roster
Players
Coaches

| Pos. | No. | Name | Age – Date of birth | Height | Club | Ctr. |
|---|---|---|---|---|---|---|
| C | 1 | Andray Blatche (NP) | 29 – 22 August 1986 | 2.11 m (6 ft 11 in) | Xinjiang Flying Tigers | (China) |
| G | 2 | Terrence Romeo | 24 – 16 March 1992 | 1.78 m (5 ft 10 in) | GlobalPort Batang Pier | (Philippines) |
| G | 3 | Bobby Ray Parks Jr. | 23 – 19 February 1993 | 1.93 m (6 ft 4 in) | Texas Legends | (United States) |
| G | 6 | Jeff Chan | 32 – 11 February 1984 | 1.88 m (6 ft 2 in) | Rain or Shine Elasto Painters | (Philippines) |
| G | 7 | Jayson William (C) | 30 – 30 June 1986 | 1.80 m (5 ft 11 in) | Tropang TNT | (Philippines) |
| G/F | 10 | Gabe Norwood | 31 – 9 February 1985 | 1.98 m (6 ft 6 in) | Rain or Shine Elasto Painters | (Philippines) |
| G | 11 | Ryan Reyes | 32 – 10 August 1983 | 1.88 m (6 ft 2 in) | Tropang TNT | (Philippines) |
| C | 12 | June Mar Fajardo | 26 – 17 November 1989 | 2.09 m (6 ft 10 in) | San Miguel Beermen | (Philippines) |
| F | 15 | Marc Pingris | 34 – 16 October 1981 | 1.95 m (6 ft 5 in) | Star Hotshots | (Philippines) |
| F | 18 | Troy Rosario | 24 – 20 January 1992 | 2.01 m (6 ft 7 in) | Tropang TNT | (Philippines) |
| F | 25 | Japeth Aguilar | 29 – 25 January 1987 | 2.07 m (6 ft 9 in) | Barangay Ginebra San Miguel | (Philippines) |
| F | 33 | Ranidel de Ocampo | 34 – 8 December 1981 | 1.98 m (6 ft 6 in) | Tropang TNT | (Philippines) |

Head coach

- (United States) Tab Baldwin

Assistant coaches

- (United States) Norman Black
- (Philippines) Alex Compton
- (Philippines) Jong Uichico
- (Philippines) Nash Racela
- (Philippines) Josh Reyes

Team manager

- (Philippines) Butch Antonio

Legend

- (C) Team captain
- (IN) Inactive
- (NP) Naturalized Player
- Club – describes last
  club before the tournament
- Age – describes age
  on 4 July 2016

=== FIBA Asia Challenge ===
This was the 12-man roster of the Philippines national team for the 2016 FIBA Asia Challenge.

Philippines men's national basketball team - 2016 FIBA Asia Challenge roster
Players
Coaches

| Pos. | No. | Name | Age – Date of birth | Height | Club | Ctr. |
|---|---|---|---|---|---|---|
| C | 7 | Arnold Van Opstal | 24 – 15 December 1991 | 2.06 m (6 ft 9 in) | De La Salle Green Archers | (Philippines) |
| F/C | 8 | Russel Escoto | 23 – 4 December 1992 | 1.98 m (6 ft 6 in) | FEU Tamaraws | (Philippines) |
| G | 9 | Ed Daquioag | 25 – 18 August 1991 | 1.78 m (5 ft 10 in) | UST Growling Tigers | (Philippines) |
| F/C | 11 | Chris Javier | 23 – 6 December 1992 | 1.93 m (6 ft 4 in) | UE Red Warriors | (Philippines) |
| F | 12 | Mac Belo | 23 – 12 February 1993 | 1.91 m (6 ft 3 in) | FEU Tamaraws | (Philippines) |
| G | 13 | Mike Tolomia | 23 – 6 January 1993 | 1.83 m (6 ft 0 in) | FEU Tamaraws | (Philippines) |
| F | 14 | Kevin Ferrer | 23 – 26 March 1993 | 1.96 m (6 ft 5 in) | UST Growling Tigers | (Philippines) |
| G/F | 16 | Roger Pogoy | 24 – 16 June 1992 | 1.88 m (6 ft 2 in) | FEU Tamaraws | (Philippines) |
| G/F | 17 | CJ Perez | 22 – 17 November 1993 | 1.88 m (6 ft 2 in) | Lyceum Pirates | (Philippines) |
| F | 18 | Carl Bryan Cruz | 25 – 21 August 1991 | 1.93 m (6 ft 4 in) | FEU Tamaraws | (Philippines) |
| G/F | 19 | Von Pessumal | 23 – 12 February 1993 | 1.88 m (6 ft 2 in) | Ateneo Blue Eagles | (Philippines) |
| F/C | 21 | Alfonzo Gotladera | 24 – 16 February 1992 | 1.98 m (6 ft 6 in) | Ateneo Blue Eagles | (Philippines) |

Head coach

- (Philippines) Josh Reyes

Assistant coaches

- (Philippines) Mike Oliver

Team manager

- (Philippines) Butch Antonio

Legend

- (C) Team captain
- (NP) Naturalized Player
- Club – describes last
  club before the tournament
- Age – describes age
  on 9 September 2016

== See also ==
- 2015 Philippines national basketball team results

== Notes ==
| Preceded by 2015 | Philippines national basketball team results 2016 | Succeeded by 2017 |
