= 2017 Philippines men's national basketball team results =

The Philippines men's national basketball team, led by head coach Chot Reyes qualified for the 2017 FIBA Asia Cup and the first round of the 2019 FIBA Basketball World Cup Asian qualifiers by earning the sole Southeast Asia berth at the 2017 SEABA Championship. In the first round of the FIBA Basketball World Cup qualifiers the Philippines was grouped with Australia, Japan and Chinese Taipei. They won over Japan in Tokyo and secured a win over Chinese Taipei at home in Quezon City. They will play against the two teams one more time as well as Australia twice in 2018.

Furthermore, two separate national teams were formed for both the 2017 FIBA Asia Cup and the Southeast Asian Games due to the overlapping schedule of the two competitions. Reyes mentored the team that participated in the FIBA Asia Cup while Jong Uichico coached the team that played at the Southeast Asian Games.

Prior to the FIBA Asia Cup stint the national team participated at the 2017 William Jones Cup.

== Record ==
Competition	Result	GP	W	L
SEABA Championship	Champions	6	6	0
William Jones Cup	4th place	8	6	2
FIBA Asia Cup	7th place	6	4	2
Southeast Asian Games	Champions	5	5	0

== Uniforms ==
Philippines 1st Uniform
Philippines 2nd Uniform

== Tournaments ==
=== SEABA Championship ===
May 12
19:00 (UTC+8)

Stats

Myanmar	40–147	Philippines
Scoring by quarter: 7–32, 5–34, 17–44, 11–37
Pts: Wana 12; Rebs: M. Aung 8 Asts: M. Aung, Han 2		Pts: Abueva 22; Rebs: Almazan, Rosario 7 Asts: Jalalon 10

Smart Araneta Coliseum, Quezon City
Referees: Jung Yu (TPE), Chuen Wing Leong (SIN), Samphan Kamphusiriphan (THA)

May 13
19:00 (UTC+8)

Stats

Philippines	113–66	Singapore
Scoring by quarter: 31–9, 32–20, 26–22, 24–15
Pts: Abueva 15; Rebs: Blatche 9 Asts: William 5		Pts: Liew 14; Rebs: Wong 6 Asts: Kwek 4

Smart Araneta Coliseum, Quezon City
Referees: Yuen Chun Yip (HKG), Chuang Chih-Chun (TPE), Harja Jaladri (INA)

May 14
19:00 (UTC+8)

Stats

Malaysia	51–106	Philippines
Scoring by quarter: 17–36, 9–25, 9–27, 16–18
Pts: Heng 12; Rebs: Choo 4 Asts: three players 2 each		Pts: Blatche, Rosario 13; Rebs: Blatche, Jalalon 8 Asts: Romeo 7

Smart Araneta Coliseum, Quezon City
Referees: Chuang Chih-Chun (TPE), Samphan Kamphusiriphan (THA), Leong Chuen Wing (SIN)

May 16
19:00 (UTC+8)

Stats

Philippines	108–53	Thailand
Scoring by quarter: 18–14, 33–12, 29–17, 28–10
Pts: Aguilar 23; Rebs: Fajardo 11; Asts: Abueva 6		Pts: Chanthachon 16; Rebs: Chanthachon 7 Asts: C. Klahan 3

Smart Araneta Coliseum, Quezon City
Referees: Chuang Chih-Chun (TPE), Harja Jaladri (INA), Leong Chuen Wing (SIN)

May 17
19:00 (UTC+8)

Stats

Vietnam	52–107	Philippines
Scoring by quarter: 16–28, 13–25, 11–36, 12–18
Pts: Nguyễn Thân Nhân 11; Rebs: Nguyễn Văn Hùng 5 Asts: five players 1 each		Pts: Wright 19; Rebs: Fajardo 12; Asts: Romeo 6

Smart Araneta Coliseum, Quezon City
Referees: Yu Jung (TPE), Chan Kin Pong (MAC), Linn Maung (MYA)

May 18
19:00 (UTC+8)

Stats

Philippines	97–64	Indonesia
Scoring by quarter: 34–14, 17–16, 27–17, 19–17
Pts: Blatche 21; Rebs: Blatche 10; Asts: Pogoy 6		Pts: Wisnu 11; Rebs: Sitorus 5 Asts: Wuysang 5

Smart Araneta Coliseum, Quezon City
Referees: Chuang Chih-Chun (TPE), Yuen Chun Yip (HKG), Ting Pick Kieng (MAS)

=== William Jones Cup ===
July 15
15:00 (UTC+8)

Report

Team Canada 150	90–77	Philippines
Scoring by quarter: 19–20, 25–14, 22–20, 24–23
Pts: Williamson 15; Rebs: Bachynski 6 Asts: Kapelan, Williamson 3		Pts: Ravena 12; Rebs: Standhardinger 10; Asts: 3 players 3

Taipei Peace International Basketball Hall, Taipei

July 16
19:00 (UTC+8)

Report

Philippines	88–72	Chinese Taipei Blue
Scoring by quarter: 23–22, 24–18, 20–21, 21–11
Pts: Standhardinger, Wright 17; Rebs: Standhardinger 15; Asts: Ravena 4		Pts: Lu Zheng-ru 16; Rebs: Chou Po-hsun 10; Asts: Liu Cheng 4

Taipei Peace International Basketball Hall, Taipei

July 17
15:00 (UTC+8)

Report

Philippines	93–82	Chinese Taipei White
Scoring by quarter: 18–20, 26–24, 25–18, 24–20
Pts: Wright 21; Rebs: Myers 14; Asts: Ravena 7		Pts: Chen Ying-chun 17; Rebs: Barone 12; Asts: Chen Ying-chun 5

Taipei Peace International Basketball Hall, Taipei

July 18
13:00 (UTC+8)

Report

Japan U24	85–100	Philippines
Scoring by quarter: 16–19, 26–22, 24–25, 19–34
Pts: Sugiura 22; Rebs: Ando 7 Asts: Hara 4		Pts: Standhardinger 22; Rebs: Myers 17; Asts: Ravena, Wright 4

Taipei Peace International Basketball Hall, Taipei

July 19
17:00 (UTC+8)

Philippines	72–83	South Korea
Scoring by quarter: 16–20, 21–22, 14–24, 21–17
Pts: Jalalon 18; Rebs: Myers 17; Asts: Ravena 5		Pts: Lee Jung-hyun (basketball, born 1987), Oh se-keun 14 each Rebs: Kim sun-hyung 7 Asts: Heo Hoon 4

Taipei Peace International Basketball Hall, Taipei

20 July
17:00 (UTC+8)

Report

Iraq	75–84	Philippines
Scoring by quarter: 19–15, 3–21, 27–27, 26–21
Pts: Mayfield 29; Rebs: Al-Hchaimi 10; Asts: Mayfield 4		Pts: Myers 16; Rebs: Myers 18; Asts: Ravena 6

Taipei Peace International Basketball Hall, Taipei

July 21
15:00 (UTC+8)

Report

Philippines	80–91	Atletas All-Star Lithuania
Scoring by quarter: 22–17, 19–33, 18–22, 21–19
Pts: Myers, Ravena 14; Rebs: Myers 7 Asts: Ravena 5		Pts: Žukauskas 22; Rebs: Beniušis 7 Asts: Žukauskas 7

Taipei Peace International Basketball Hall, Taipei

July 22
13:00 (UTC+8)

Report

India	70–101	Philippines
Scoring by quarter: 24–27, 7–27, 24–26, 15–21
Pts: Am. Singh 25; Rebs: Pandi 10; Asts: Bukankere Krishne Gowda 2		Pts: Wright 19; Rebs: Myers 7 Asts: Jalalon 5

Taipei Peace International Basketball Hall, Taipei

July 23
17:00 (UTC+8)

Report

Philippines	90–82	Iran
Scoring by quarter: 26–22, 24–20, 20–20, 20–20
Pts: Myers 21; Rebs: Myers 21; Asts: Pogoy, Ravena 3		Pts: Pazrofteh, Soleymani 21; Rebs: Pazrofteh 14; Asts: Falahat 6

Taipei Peace International Basketball Hall, Taipei

=== FIBA Asia Cup ===
Preliminary Round – Group B

August 9
13:30 (UTC+3)

Box score

China	87–96	Philippines
Scoring by quarter: 16–26, 23–27, 31–23, 17–20
Pts: Guo 18; Rebs: Hu 7 Asts: Guo, Liu 5		Pts: Romeo 26; Rebs: Pogoy, Standhardinger 6 Asts: William 7

Nouhad Nawfal Stadium, Zouk Mikael
Referees: Rabah Noujaim (LBN), Scott Paul Beker (AUS), Yevgeniy Mikheyev (KAZ)

August 11
16:00 (UTC+3)

Box score

Philippines	84–68	Iraq
Scoring by quarter: 17–19, 15–12, 28–9, 24–28
Pts: Romeo 17; Rebs: three players 7 each Asts: William 6		Pts: Galloway 23; Rebs: Galloway 14; Asts: Galloway 6

Nouhad Nawfal Stadium, Zouk Mikael
Referees: Rabah Noujaim (LBN), Ryan Jones (NZL), Toru Katayose (JPN)

August 13
16:00 (UTC+3)

Box score

Philippines	80–74	Qatar
Scoring by quarter: 25–16, 16–11, 18–20, 21–27
Pts: Wright 25; Rebs: Norwood, Pogoy 7 Asts: Norwood 5		Pts: Elhadary 23; Rebs: Saad 11; Asts: Elhadary 6

Nouhad Nawfal Stadium, Zouk Mikael
Referees: Ryan Jones (NZL), Marwan Egho (LBN), Kim Jong-kuk (KOR)

Quarterfinals

August 16
18:30 (UTC+3)

Box score

Philippines	86–118	South Korea
Scoring by quarter: 18–26, 31–31, 13–29, 24–32
Pts: Romeo 22; Rebs: Aguilar 9 Asts: William, Wright 4		Pts: Oh 22; Rebs: Oh, Park 5 Asts: Park 9

Nouhad Nawfal Stadium, Zouk Mikael
Referees: Scott Paul Beker (AUS), Matthew Beattie (AUS), Ryan Jones (NZL)

5th–8th place semifinals

August 19
16:00 (UTC+3)

Box score

Lebanon	106–87	Philippines
Scoring by quarter: 29–18, 21–24, 25–19, 31–26
Pts: El Khatib 36; Rebs: Pelle 13; Asts: El Khatib 8 Blocks: Pelle 9		Pts: Romeo 19; Rebs: Aguilar 6 Asts: William 7

Nouhad Nawfal Stadium, Zouk Mikael
Referees: Scott Paul Beker (AUS), Matthew Beattie (AUS), Alexey Stepanenko (KAZ)

Seventh place game

August 20
13:30 (UTC+3)

Box score

Philippines	75–70	Jordan
Scoring by quarter: 17–17, 18–10, 23–26, 17–17
Pts: Romeo, Wright 13; Rebs: Aguilar 7 Asts: William 8		Pts: Al-Awadi 21; Rebs: Hussein 15; Asts: Abdeen 4

Nouhad Nawfal Stadium, Zouk Mikael
Referees: Wang Mei (CHN), Mohammad Doost (IRI), Chuang Chih-Chun (TPE)

=== Southeast Asian Games ===
Preliminary Round – Group A

August 20
21:30 (UTC+8)

Report

Thailand	74–81	Philippines
Scoring by quarter: 12–22, 22–14, 25–24, 15–21
Pts: Lamb 17; Rebs: Jakrawan 14; Asts: Samerjai 3		Pts: Rosario 16; Rebs: Rosario, Standhardinger 10 each Asts: Amer 10

MABA Stadium
Referees: Ji Hu (CHN), Rendra Lesmana (INA), Hwee Liak Wong (SGP)

August 22
18:00 (UTC+8)

Report

Philippines	129–34	Myanmar
Scoring by quarter: 31–7, 29–3, 38–6, 31–18
Pts: Jose 22; Rebs: Standhardinger 11; Asts: Tolomia 6		Pts: Kyaw 12; Rebs: Han, Phyo 5 each Asts: Aung 4

MABA Stadium
Referees: Hwee Liak Wong (SGP), Rendra Lesmana (INA), Thongpathoum Mikeo (LAO)

August 23
18:00 (UTC+8)

Report

Malaysia	66–98	Philippines
Scoring by quarter: 20–18, 15–29, 11–26, 20–25
Pts: Kuek 14; Rebs: Ting 5 Asts: Teo 4		Pts: Standhardinger 18; Rebs: Standhardinger 18; Asts: Ravena 3

MABA Stadium

Semifinal

August 25
17:00 (UTC+8)

Report

Philippines	68–60	Singapore
Scoring by quarter: 15–12, 17–12, 17–18, 19–18
Pts: Rosario 14; Rebs: Standhardinger 11; Asts: Amer 4		Pts: Low 14; Rebs: Goh 8 Asts: Wong 3

MABA Stadium

Gold medal match

August 26
20:15 (UTC+8)

Report

Philippines	94–55	Indonesia
Scoring by quarter: 19–15, 26–12, 22–11, 27–17
Pts: Tolomia 20; Rebs: Parks 12; Asts: Parks 5		Pts: Pratama, Kurniawan 10 each Rebs: Lopez 7 Asts: Prastawa 3

MABA Stadium
Attendance: 2,123

=== 2019 FIBA Basketball World Cup qualifiers ===
Phase: Asia - First round

Pos	Team	Pld	W	L	PF	PA	PD	Pts	Qualification
1	Australia	2	2	0	186	124	+62	4	Second round
2	Philippines	2	2	0	167	154	+13	4	Second round
3	Japan	2	0	2	129	159	−30	2	Second round
4	Chinese Taipei	2	0	2	149	194	−45	2	

Updated to match(es) played on 27 November 2017. Source: FIBA
Rules for classification: 1) Points. 2) Points difference. 3) Head-to-head results. 4) Points scored.

November 24
19:00 (UTC+9)

Boxscore

Japan	71–77	Philippines
Scoring by quarter: 10–18, 18–19, 27–22, 16–18
Pts: Hiejima 20; Rebs: Brown 15; Asts: Hiejima 5		Pts: William 20; Rebs: Blatche 12; Asts: William 6

Komazawa Gymnasium, Tokyo
Referees: Budi Marfan (INA), Nicolas Fernandes (TAH), Ryan Jones (NZL)

November 27
19:00 (UTC+8)

Boxscore

Philippines	90–83	Chinese Taipei
Scoring by quarter: 18–23, 26–19, 21–22, 25–19
Pts: William 20; Rebs: Blatche 14; Asts: Ravena 5		Pts: Davis 20; Rebs: Davis 9 Asts: Chiang 6

Smart Araneta Coliseum, Quezon City
Referees: Ryan Jones (NZL), Nicolas Fernandes (TAH), Ye Nan (CHN)

== Rosters ==
=== SEABA Championship ===
This was roster of the Philippines national team for the 2017 SEABA Championship.

Philippines men's national basketball team pool roster
Players
Coaches

Pos.	No.	Name	Age – Date of birth	Height	Club	Ctr.
F	8	Calvin Abueva	29 – February 4, 1988	1.91 m (6 ft 3 in)	Alaska Aces	(Philippines)
F/C	25	Japeth Aguilar	30 – January 25, 1987	2.06 m (6 ft 9 in)	Barangay Ginebra San Miguel	(Philippines)
F/C	20	Raymond Almazan	27 – August 2, 1989	2.03 m (6 ft 8 in)	Rain or Shine Elasto Painters	(Philippines)
F/C	11	Andray Blatche (NP)	30 – August 22, 1986	2.11 m (6 ft 11 in)	Xinjiang Flying Tigers	(China)
C	15	June Mar Fajardo	27 – November 17, 1989	2.08 m (6 ft 10 in)	San Miguel Beermen	(Philippines)
G/F	22	Allein Malicsi	29 – September 18, 1987	1.93 m (6 ft 4 in)	Star Hotshots	(Philippines)
G	6	Jio Jalalon	24 – August 2, 1992	1.75 m (5 ft 9 in)	Star Hotshots	(Philippines)
G/F	16	Roger Pogoy	24 – June 16, 1992	1.88 m (6 ft 2 in)	TNT KaTropa	(Philippines)
G	7	Terrence Romeo	25 – March 16, 1992	1.80 m (5 ft 11 in)	GlobalPort Batang Pier	(Philippines)
F	18	Troy Rosario	25 – January 20, 1992	2.01 m (6 ft 7 in)	TNT KaTropa	(Philippines)
G	17	Jayson William	30 – June 30, 1986	1.78 m (5 ft 10 in)	TNT KaTropa	(Philippines)
G/F	35	Matthew Wright	25 – March 7, 1992	1.93 m (6 ft 4 in)	Phoenix Fuel Masters	(Philippines)

Head coach

- (Philippines) Chot Reyes

Assistant coaches

- (Philippines) Jong Uichico
- (Philippines) Jimmy Alapag

Team manager

- (Philippines) Butch Antonio

Legend

- (C) Team captain
- (NP) Naturalized Player
- Club – describes last
  club before the tournament
- Age – describes age
  on May 12, 2017

=== William Jones Cup ===
This was roster of the Philippines national team for the 2017 William Jones Cup.

Philippines men's national basketball team - 2017 William Jones Cup roster
Players
Coaches

Pos.	No.	Name	Age – Date of birth	Height	Club	Ctr.
G	1	Kiefer Ravena	23 – October 27, 1993	1.91 m (6 ft 3 in)	Alab Pilipinas	(Philippines)
F	2	Mac Belo	24 – February 12, 1993	1.99 m (6 ft 6 in)	Blackwater Elite	(Philippines)
G	3	Ed Daquioag	25 – August 18, 1991	1.93 m (6 ft 4 in)	Blackwater Elite	(Philippines)
F	4	Carl Bryan Cruz	25 – August 21, 1991	2.04 m (6 ft 8 in)	Alaska Aces	(Philippines)
G	6	Jio Jalalon	24 – August 2, 1992	1.89 m (6 ft 2 in)	Star Hotshots	(Philippines)
G	7	Bobby Parks Jr.	24 – February 19, 1993	2.04 m (6 ft 8 in)	Alab Pilipinas	(Philippines)
F	8	Raymar Jose	24 – August 6, 1992	2.06 m (6 ft 9 in)	Cignal HD Hawkeyes	(Philippines)
G	9	Almond Vosotros	27 – January 26, 1990	1.94 m (6 ft 4 in)	Free agent
G	13	Mike Tolomia	24 – January 6, 1993	1.93 m (6 ft 4 in)	Rain or Shine Elasto Painters	(Philippines)
F	14	Kevin Ferrer	24 – March 26, 1993	1.98 m (6 ft 6 in)	Barangay Ginebra San Miguel	(Philippines)
G/F	16	Roger Pogoy	25 – June 16, 1992	1.98 m (6 ft 6 in)	TNT KaTropa	(Philippines)
G/F	19	Von Pessumal	24 – February 12, 1993	1.98 m (6 ft 6 in)	San Miguel Beermen	(Philippines)
F	21	Alfonzo Gotladera	25 – February 16, 1992	2.03 m (6 ft 8 in)	NLEX Road Warriors	(Philippines)
G/F	23	Kobe Paras	19 – September 19, 1997	2.07 m (6 ft 9 in)	Cal State Northridge	(United States)
	24	Mike Myers (I)	25 – July 2, 1992	2.11 m (6 ft 11 in)	TNT KaTropa	(Philippines)
F	34	Christian Standhardinger	28 – July 4, 1989	2.06 m (6 ft 9 in)	Free agent
G	35	Matthew Wright	25 – March 7, 1992	1.94 m (6 ft 4 in)	Phoenix Fuel Masters	(Philippines)

Head coach

- (Philippines) Chot Reyes

Assistant coaches

- (Philippines) Jong Uichico
- (Philippines) Joshua Vincent Reyes
- (Philippines) Jim Castro
- (Philippines) Jem Ryn Betia

Team manager

- (Philippines) Butch Antonio

Legend

- (C) Team captain
- (I) Import
- Club – describes last
  club before the tournament
- Age – describes age
  on July 16, 2017

=== FIBA Asia Cup ===
On 25 July 2017, Philippines coach Chot Reyes released the final lineup for the Philippines for the 2017 FIBA Asia Cup. Christian Standhardinger, who played with the national team in the 2017 William Jones Cup, will be the team's naturalized player, with Andray Blatche unable to compete due to various reasons.

Philippines men's national basketball team - 2017 FIBA Asia Cup roster
Players
Coaches

Pos.	No.	Name	Age – Date of birth	Height	Club	Ctr.
G	7	Jayson William	31 – June 30, 1986	1.78 m (5 ft 10 in)	TNT KaTropa	(Philippines)
G	2	Terrence Romeo	25 – March 16, 1992	1.80 m (5 ft 11 in)	GlobalPort Batang Pier	(Philippines)
G	6	Jio Jalalon	25 – August 2, 1992	1.75 m (5 ft 9 in)	Star Hotshots	(Philippines)
G/F	16	Roger Pogoy	25 – June 16, 1992	1.88 m (6 ft 2 in)	TNT KaTropa	(Philippines)
G/F	35	Matthew Wright	25 – March 7, 1992	1.93 m (6 ft 4 in)	Phoenix Fuel Masters	(Philippines)
G/F	5	Gabe Norwood	32 – 9 February 1985	1.98 m (6 ft 6 in)	Rain or Shine Elasto Painters	(Philippines)
F	8	Calvin Abueva	29 – February 4, 1988	1.91 m (6 ft 3 in)	Alaska Aces	(Philippines)
F/C	25	Japeth Aguilar	30 – January 25, 1987	2.06 m (6 ft 9 in)	Barangay Ginebra San Miguel	(Philippines)
F/C	20	Raymond Almazan	28 – August 2, 1989	2.03 m (6 ft 8 in)	Rain or Shine Elasto Painters	(Philippines)
C	15	June Mar Fajardo	27 – November 17, 1989	2.08 m (6 ft 10 in)	San Miguel Beermen	(Philippines)
F	34	Christian Standhardinger (NP)	28 – July 4, 1989	2.01 m (6 ft 7 in)	Free agent
F	4	Carl Bryan Cruz	25 – August 21, 1991	1.93 m (6 ft 4 in)	Alaska Aces	(Philippines)

Head coach

- (Philippines) Chot Reyes

Assistant coaches

- (Philippines) Joshua Vincent Reyes
- (Philippines) Jem Ryn Betia

Team manager

- (Philippines) Butch Antonio

Legend

- (C) Team captain
- (NP) Naturalized player
- Club – describes last
  club before the tournament
- Age – describes age
  on August 8, 2017

=== Southeast Asian Games ===
The following is the roster of the Philippines national team for the 2017 Southeast Asian Games

Philippines men's national basketball team - 2017 Southeast Asian Games roster
Players
Coaches

Pos.	No.	Name	Age – Date of birth	Height	Club	Ctr.
PG	13	Mike Tolomia	20 – January 6, 1997	1.93 m (6 ft 4 in)	Rain or Shine Elasto Painters	(Philippines)
SG	19	Von Pessumal	18 – February 12, 1999	1.98 m (6 ft 6 in)	San Miguel Beermen	(Philippines)
SF	14	Kevin Ferrer	22 – March 26, 1995	1.99 m (6 ft 6 in)	Barangay Ginebra San Miguel	(Philippines)
PF	4	Carl Bryan Cruz	17 – August 21, 1999	2.03 m (6 ft 8 in)	Alaska Aces	(Philippines)
PF	16	Troy Rosario	19 – January 20, 1998	2.03 m (6 ft 8 in)	TNT KaTropa	(Philippines)
G	9	Almond Vosotros	22 – January 26, 1995	1.91 m (6 ft 3 in)	Free agent
C	8	Raymar Jose	23 – August 6, 1994	2.03 m (6 ft 8 in)	Cignal HD Hawkeyes	(Philippines)
PG	7	Baser Amer	22 – September 29, 1994	1.90 m (6 ft 3 in)	Meralco Bolts	(Philippines)
G	3	Bobby Parks Jr.	23 – February 19, 1994	2.00 m (6 ft 7 in)	Alab Pilipinas	(Philippines)
PG	1	Kiefer Ravena	21 – October 27, 1995	1.91 m (6 ft 3 in)	Alab Pilipinas	(Philippines)
SF	6	Kobe Paras	19 – September 19, 1997	2.06 m (6 ft 9 in)	Cal State Northridge	(United States)
C	34	Christian Standhardinger	22 – July 4, 1995	2.06 m (6 ft 9 in)	Free agent	(Philippines)

Head coach

- (Philippines) Jong Uichico

Assistant coaches

- (Philippines) Jimmy Alapag

Team manager

- To be announced

Legend

- (C) Team captain
- (NP) Naturalized Player
- Club – describes last
  club before the tournament
- Age – describes age
  on August 19, 2017

=== 2019 FIBA Basketball World Cup qualification (Asia) – First Round ===
Versus Japan and Chinese Taipei

On 23 November 2017, Philippines coach Chot Reyes released the final lineup for the Philippines for the 2019 FIBA Basketball World Cup qualification match against Japan and Chinese Taipei.

Philippines men's national basketball team – 2019 FIBA Basketball World Cup qualification roster
Players
Coaches

Pos.	No.	Name	Age – Date of birth	Height	Club	Ctr.
G	1	Kiefer Ravena	24 – October 27, 1993	1.83 m (6 ft 0 in)	NLEX Road Warriors	(Philippines)
G/F	5	Gabe Norwood	32 – February 9, 1985	1.98 m (6 ft 6 in)	Rain or Shine Elasto Painters	(Philippines)
G	7	Jayson William	31 – June 30, 1986	1.80 m (5 ft 11 in)	TNT KaTropa	(Philippines)
F	8	Calvin Abueva	29 – February 4, 1988	1.86 m (6 ft 1 in)	Alaska Aces	(Philippines)
F/C	11	Andray Blatche (NP)	31 – August 22, 1986	2.11 m (6 ft 11 in)	Xinjiang Flying Tigers	(China)
C	15	June Mar Fajardo	28 – November 17, 1989	2.11 m (6 ft 11 in)	San Miguel Beermen	(Philippines)
G	16	Roger Pogoy	25 – June 16, 1992	1.82 m (6 ft 0 in)	TNT KaTropa	(Philippines)
F	18	Troy Rosario	25 – January 20, 1992	2.01 m (6 ft 7 in)	TNT KaTropa	(Philippines)
G/F	22	Allein Malicsi	30 – September 18, 1987	1.93 m (6 ft 4 in)	Blackwater Elite	(Philippines)
F/C	25	Japeth Aguilar	30 – January 25, 1987	2.08 m (6 ft 10 in)	Barangay Ginebra San Miguel	(Philippines)
F	35	Matthew Wright	26 – February 7, 1991	1.87 m (6 ft 2 in)	Phoenix Fuel Masters	(Philippines)
G	6	Kevin Alas	26 – November 13, 1991	1.83 m (6 ft 0 in)	NLEX Road Warriors	(Philippines)

Head coach

- (Philippines) Chot Reyes

Assistant coach(es)

- (Philippines) Joshua Vincent Reyes
- (Philippines) Jong Uichico

Team manager

- (Philippines) Butch Antonio

Legend

- (C) Team captain
- (NP) Naturalized player
- Club – describes last
  club before the tournament
- Age – describes age
  on 24 November 2017

== See also ==
- 2016 Philippines national basketball team results

Preceded by 2016	Philippines national basketball team results 2016	Succeeded by 2018
