= 2015 Philippines men's national basketball team results =

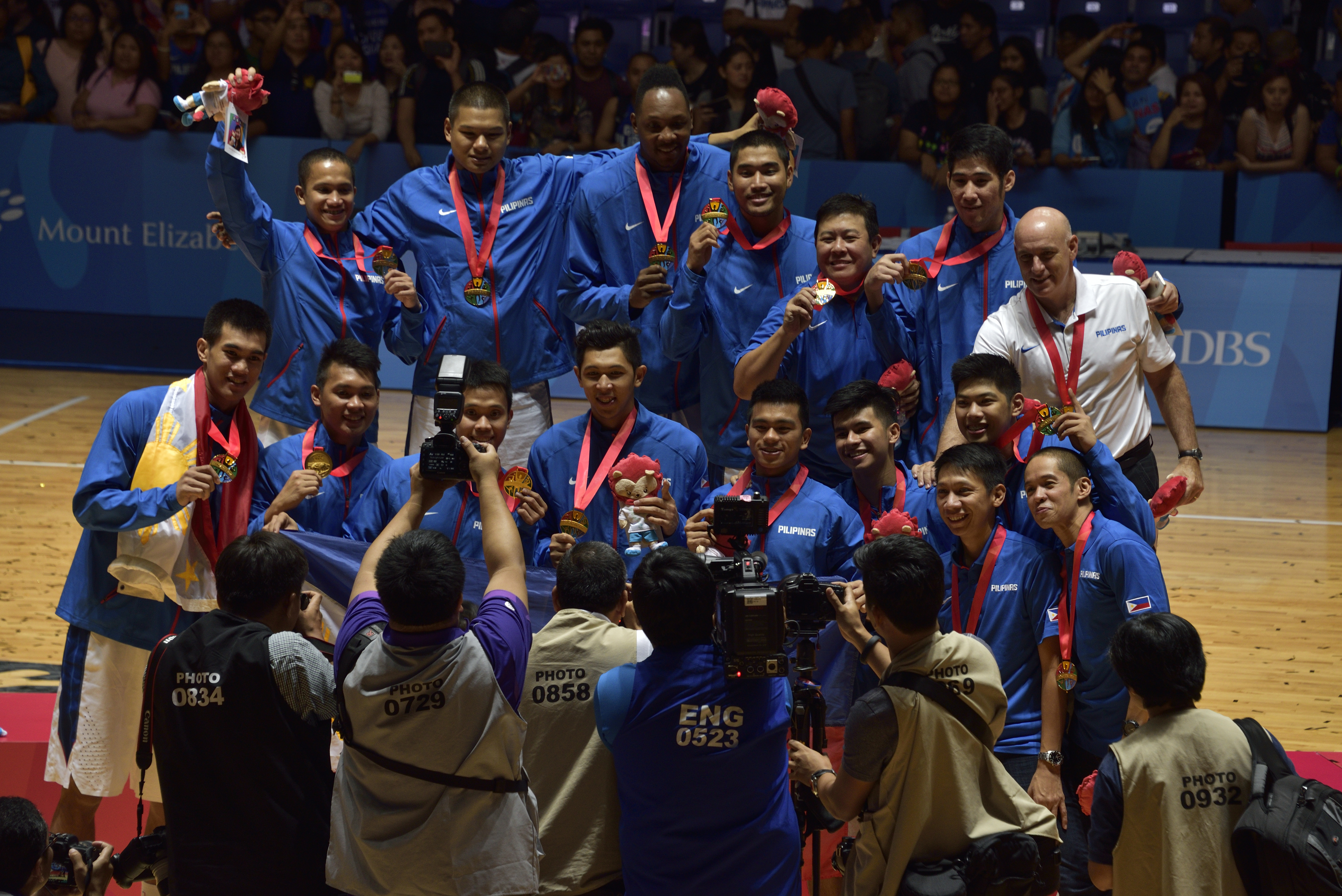
The national team at the 2015 Southeast Asian Games

The Philippines national basketball team is led by newly appointed head coach Tab Baldwin whose 4-year contract started in January 2015. Baldwin's first tournament as head coach was the 2015 SEABA Championship where he led a national team composed mostly of collegiate and amateur players. The Philippines won the gold medal at the aforementioned tournament. The national team participated at the 2015 FIBA Asia Championship and had a training camp in Turkey, participated at the 2015 Toyota Four Nations Cup in Estonia and 2015 MVP Cup which was hosted at home in Quezon City.

== Record ==
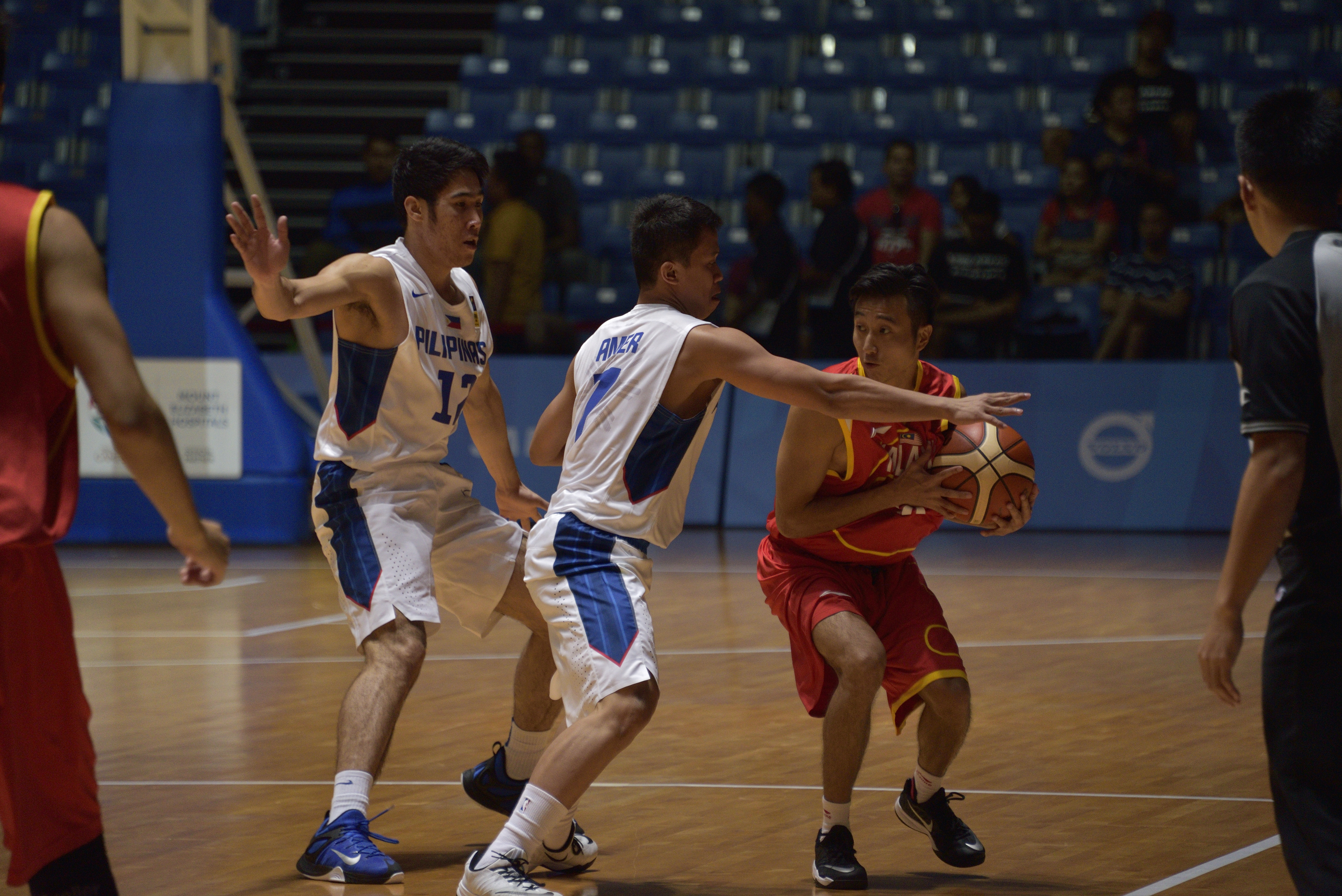
Philippines v. Malaysia at the 2015 SEA Games

Competition	GP	W	L
2015 FIBA Asia Championship	9	7	2
2015 William Jones Cup	8	6	2
2015 SEABA Championship	5	5	0
2015 Southeast Asian Games	5	5	0
2015 Toyota Four Nations Cup	3	0	3
2015 MVP Cup	3	3	0
Total	33	26	7

== Uniforms ==
Philippines 1st Uniform
Philippines 2nd Uniform

== Tournaments ==
=== SEABA Championship ===
April 27
18:00

Stats

Indonesia	36–92	Philippines
Scoring by quarter: 7–26, 12–24, 10–21, 7–21
Pts: Pamungkas 12; Rebs: Nugroho 5 Asts: Priasmoro 2		Pts: Parks 15; Rebs: Parks 6 Asts: Jalalon, Ravena, Torres 3

OCBC Arena, Kallang

April 28
16:00

Stats

Laos	37–124	Philippines
Scoring by quarter: 5–37, 4–32, 9–35, 19–20
Pts: Labouaphieng 11; Rebs: Lothalath, Phongphoumy, Labouaphieng 6 Asts: Phongphoumy, Sonenalad 1		Pts: Rosario 19; Rebs: Thompson 10; Asts: Thompson 7

OCBC Arena, Kallang

April 29
18:00

Stats

Philippines	104–42	Malaysia
Scoring by quarter: 23–14, 34–15, 22–6, 25–7
Pts: Ravena 15; Rebs: Torres 9 Asts: Jalalon 6		Pts: Koh 11; Rebs: Koh, Kwaan 5 Asts: Tong 3

OCBC Arena, Kallang

April 30
18:00

Stats

Philippines	140–29	Brunei
Scoring by quarter: 36–10, 32–6, 37–3, 35–10
Pts: Parks 19; Rebs: Rosario 8 Asts: Thompson 12		Pts: Ching 9 Rebs: Hj Hussin 3 Asts: Lim 2

OCBC Arena, Kallang

May 1
20:00

Stats

Singapore	56–82	Philippines
Scoring by quarter: 19–26, 11–25, 17–24, 9–7
Pts: Wong 17; Rebs: Wong 6 Asts: Wong, Oh 3		Pts: Douthit 16; Rebs: Douthit 7 Asts: Jalalon 4

OCBC Arena, Kallang

=== Southeast Asian Games ===
==== Group stage ====
June 10
13:00

Report

Indonesia	52–81	Philippines
Scoring by quarter: 4–14, 20–21, 10–25, 18–21
Pts: Sanjaya 9 Rebs: Enguio Lopez 7 Asts: Wisnu, R. Gunawan, Sitepu 2		Pts: Ravena 16; Rebs: Rosario 11; Asts: Amer, Douthit 3

OCBC Arena Hall 1, Kallang
Referees: Leong Chuen Wing (SIN), Thongchai Thaweewutsophon (THA), Chuang Chih Chun (TPE)

June 11
16:00

Report

Philippines	100–48	Malaysia
Scoring by quarter: 20–9, 28–11, 27–15, 25–13
Pts: Vosotros 21; Rebs: Torres, Douthit 8 Asts: Ravena 6		Pts: Yeo 10; Rebs: Tian 5 Asts: Wen 3

OCBC Arena Hall 1, Kallang
Referees: Jontapa Nattapong (THA), Wu Xin (SIN), Yang Xiaoguang (CHN)

June 12
18:00

Report

Philippines	126–21	Timor-Leste
Scoring by quarter: 40–3, 23–8, 36–5, 27–5
Pts: Rivero 24; Rebs: Thompson 9 Asts: Khobuntin 6		Pts: Miranda 6 Rebs: Da Silva Ribeiro 6 Asts: Pereira 2

OCBC Arena Hall 1, Kallang
Referees: Leong Chuen Wing (SIN), Jontapa Nattapong (THA), Lwin Htoo Wai (MYA)

==== Semifinal ====
June 14
18:00

Report

Philippines	80–75	Thailand
Scoring by quarter: 14–22, 19–21, 26–13, 21–19
Pts: Rosario 27; Rebs: Rosario 12; Asts: Ferrer 4		Pts: Kruatiwa, Muangboon 15; Rebs: Apiromvilachai 5 Asts: Ghogar, Klahan 4

OCBC Arena Hall 1, Kallang
Referees: Yong Sern Tee (MAS), Naing Phyo Win (MYA), Yang Xiaoguang (CHN)

==== Final ====
June 15
20:00

Report

Philippines	72–64	Indonesia
Scoring by quarter: 22–15, 17–11, 19–21, 14–17
Pts: Belo 22; Rebs: 4 players 5 Asts: Ravena 3		Pts: Kurniawan 16; Rebs: Wisnu, R. Gunawan 5 Asts: Wuysang 5

OCBC Arena Hall 1, Kallang
Referees: Poh Seng Goh (SIN), Yong Sern Tee (MAS), Yang Xiaoguang (CHN)

=== Toyota Four Nations Cup ===
August 20
17:30

Report

Netherlands	89–62	Philippines
Scoring by quarter: 21–20, 18–18, 29–4, 21–20
Pts: Schaftenaar 15; Rebs: Schaftenaar, De Pagter 7		Pts: Abueva 12; Rebs: Blatche 12

Saku Suurhall Arena, Tallinn
Attendance: 500

August 21
17:30

Report

Philippines	80–90	Estonia
Scoring by quarter: 18–33, 17–22, 22–22, 23–13
Pts: Blatche 16; Rebs: Norwood 5		Pts: Talts 20; Rebs: Vene 8

Saku Suurhall Arena, Tallinn
Attendance: 3,000

August 22
17:30

Report

Iceland	86–76	Philippines
Scoring by quarter: 22–16, 21–22, 16–18, 27–20
Pts: Vilhjálmsson 19; Rebs: Bæringsson, Ermolinskij 6		Pts: Blatche 22; Rebs: Blatche, Norwood, Tautuaa 6

Saku Suurhall Arena, Tallinn
Attendance: 500

=== William Jones Cup ===
August 30
19:00

Report

Philippines	77–69	Chinese Taipei A
Scoring by quarter: 26–20, 21–11, 7–23, 23–15
Pts: Romeo 18; Rebs: Tautuaa 9 Asts: William 4		Pts: Chen S.N., Davis 12; Rebs: Davis 13; Asts: Chen S.N. 4

Xinchuang Gymnasium, New Taipei City
Referees: Jafar Mohammadpour, Matthew Bathurstt, Horiuchi Jun

August 31
17:00

Report

South Korea	82–70	Philippines
Scoring by quarter: 20–21, 16–13, 18–20, 28–16
Pts: Lee S.H. 19; Rebs: Moon T.Y. 12; Asts: Park C.H., Kim T.S. 4		Pts: Romeo 23; Rebs: Abueva, De Ocampo 6 Asts: William 3

Xinchuang Gymnasium, New Taipei City
Referees: Matthew Bathurstt, Jafar Mohammadpour, Horiuchi Jun

September 1
13:00

Report

Philippines	85–71	(Russia) Spartak Primorye
Scoring by quarter: 20–23, 23–17, 18–10, 24–21
Pts: De Ocampo 13; Rebs: Abueva 8 Asts: Tautuaa 5		Pts: Glazyrin 23; Rebs: Fediushin 8 Asts: Savelev 3

Xinchuang Gymnasium, New Taipei City
Referees: Shin Gi Rok, Leong Chuen Wing, Huang Hsien-Ming

September 2
15:00

Report

Japan	60–75	Philippines
Scoring by quarter: 10–11, 15–18, 19–17, 16–29
Pts: Takeuchi 15; Rebs: Takeuchi 13; Asts: Three players 2		Pts: Romeo 16; Rebs: Abueva 8 Asts: William 5

Xinchuang Gymnasium, New Taipei City
Referees: Chen Hung-Ming, Lin Chieh-Hung, Wei Sheng-Hsuan

September 3
13:00

Report

Philippines	65–74	Iran
Scoring by quarter: 14–17, 17–17, 16–20, 18–20
Pts: Taulava 12; Rebs: Taulava 8 Asts: Norwood 3		Pts: Haddadi 22; Rebs: Haddadi 15; Asts: Kamrani 4

Xinchuang Gymnasium, New Taipei City
Referees: Wu Liang-Min, Hsien Wen-Wei, Chang Lu-Yueh

September 4
13:00

Report

Philippines	92–88 (OT)	(New Zealand) Wellington Saints
Scoring by quarter: 25–25, 7–17, 20–17, 26–19, Overtime: 14–10
Pts: William 22; Rebs: Abueva 10; Asts: William 5		Pts: Davis 31; Rebs: Davis 13; Asts: Bloxham 7

Xinchuang Gymnasium, New Taipei City
Referees: Chen Caun-Chih, Chu Sheng-Tung, Huang Hsien-Ming

September 5
17:00

Report

USA Overtake-Select (United States)	74–78	Philippines
Scoring by quarter: 13–15, 17–25, 17–20, 27–18
Pts: Chandler 20; Rebs: Warner 16; Asts: Hall 2		Pts: Abueva 20; Rebs: Abueva, Tautuaa 8 Asts: Ganuelas 4

Xinchuang Gymnasium, New Taipei City
Referees: Wu Liang-Min, Chan Wai Seong, Hsien Wen-Wei

September 6
13:00

Report

Philippines	96–67	Chinese Taipei B
Scoring by quarter: 24–21, 26–11, 32–21, 14–14
Pts: David 22; Rebs: Ramos 10; Asts: William 4		Pts: Chien 18; Rebs: Chen 8 Asts: Lin 6

Xinchuang Gymnasium, New Taipei City
Referees: Horiuchi Jun, Shin Gi Rok, Ho Ming Tat

=== MVP Cup ===
September 11
19:00

Report

Talk 'N Text (Philippines)	77–93	Philippines
Scoring by quarter: 22–23, 18–22, 12–24, 25–24
Pts: Fonacier 20; Rebs: Fonacier 9 Asts: Fonacier, J. Reyes, Miranda 4		Pts: Romeo 22; Rebs: Abueva 7 Asts: Romeo 6

Smart Araneta Coliseum, Quezon City

September 12
17:00

Report

Wellington Saints (New Zealand)	81–84	Philippines
Scoring by quarter: 23–20, 19–18, 23–16, 16–30
Pts: Braswell 25; Rebs: Turner 15; Asts: Braswell 5		Pts: Romeo 18; Rebs: Blatche 9 Asts: William 6

Smart Araneta Coliseum, Quezon City

September 13
17:00

Report

Chinese Taipei	77–90	Philippines
Scoring by quarter: 15–27, 19–19, 25–27, 18–17
Pts: Lu 23; Rebs: Tien 5 Asts: Chen S.N. 7		Pts: Blatche 18; Rebs: Blatche 12; Asts: Romeo 4

Smart Araneta Coliseum, Quezon City

=== FIBA Asia Championship ===
==== Preliminary round ====
September 23
11:45

Boxscore

Philippines	73–75	Palestine
Scoring by quarter: 27–12, 18–28, 14–15, 14–20
Pts: Blatche 21; Rebs: Blatche 11; Asts: Blatche, Intal 2		Pts: Abu-Shamala 26; Rebs: Abu-Shamala 15; Asts: Qahwash 3

Changsha Social Work College's gymnasium, Changsha
Referees: Marwan Egho (LIB), Zhu Duan (CHN), Victor Min De Mah (SIN)

September 24
09:30

Boxscore

Philippines	101–50	Hong Kong
Scoring by quarter: 28–15, 23–7, 32–16, 18–12
Pts: William 21; Rebs: Blatche, De Ocampo 8 Asts: Ganuelas-Rosser 3		Pts: S. Chan 13; Rebs: C. Wong 10; Asts: Reid 5

Changsha Social Work College's gymnasium, Changsha
Referees: Naser Abu Rashed (JOR), Andryushkin Arsen (KAZ), Victor Mah (SIN)

September 25
16:45

Boxscore

Kuwait	64–110	Philippines
Scoring by quarter: 11–34, 16–21, 21–32, 16–23
Pts: A. Al-Shammari 15; Rebs: A. Al-Shammari, Borhamah 4 Asts: Alsaeid 5		Pts: Romeo 19; Rebs: Taulava 10; Asts: four players 2

Changsha Social Work College's gymnasium, Changsha
Referees: Andryushkin Arsen (KAZ), Naser Rashed (JOR), Victor Mah (SIN)

==== Second round ====
September 27
16:45

Boxscore

Japan	66–73	Philippines
Scoring by quarter: 18–14, 15–21, 13–19, 20–19
Pts: Hiejima 17; Rebs: Takeuchi 11; Asts: four players 2		Pts: Blatche 18; Rebs: Blatche 10; Asts: William 4

Changsha Social Work College's gymnasium, Changsha
Referees: Marwan Egho (LIB), Harja Jaladri (INA), Victor Mah (SIN)

September 28
11:45

Boxscore

Philippines	87–73	Iran
Scoring by quarter: 22–25, 15–18, 28–17, 22–13
Pts: William 26; Rebs: De Ocampo 10; Asts: Norwood, William 3		Pts: Nikkhah Bahrami 21; Rebs: Sahakian 8 Asts: Kamrani 3

Changsha Social Work College's gymnasium, Changsha
Referees: Harja Jaladri (INA), Intae Hwang (KOR), Yevgeniy Mikheyev (KAZ)

September 29
14:30

Boxscore

Philippines	99–65	India
Scoring by quarter: 16–17, 26–19, 23–14, 34–15
Pts: Romeo 20; Rebs: Abueva, Intal 7 Asts: Intal, Romeo 4		Pts: Bhriguvanshi 21; Rebs: Amr. Singh 13; Asts: Bhriguvanshi, Amj. Singh 3

Changsha Social Work College's gymnasium, Changsha
Referees: Marwan Egho (LIB), Intae Hwang (KOR), Ling Peng (CHN)

==== Final round ====
===== Quarterfinals =====
October 1
21:30

Boxscore

Philippines	82–70	Lebanon
Scoring by quarter: 20–16, 17–16, 20–17, 25–21
Pts: William 25; Rebs: Blatche 17; Asts: Blatche 3		Pts: Haidar 18; Rebs: Bawji 13; Asts: Youngblood 5

Changsha Social Work College's gymnasium, Changsha
Referees: Mohammad Al-Amiri (KUW), Naser Abu Rashed (JOR), Yevgeniy Mikheyev (KAZ)

===== Semifinals =====
October 2
22:00

Boxscore

Japan	70–81	Philippines
Scoring by quarter: 17–16, 22–23, 15–15, 16–27
Pts: Hiejima 28; Rebs: Takeuchi 16; Asts: Hiejima 2		Pts: Blatche 22; Rebs: Blatche 13; Asts: William 7

Changsha Social Work College's gymnasium, Changsha
Referees: Yevgeniy Mikheyev (KAZ), Arsen Andryuhskin (KAZ), Snehal Bendke (IND)

===== Final =====
October 3
20:30

Boxscore

China	78–67	Philippines
Scoring by quarter: 23–19, 23–16, 14–15, 18–17
Pts: Guo 19; Rebs: Yi 15; Asts: Ding 3		Pts: Blatche 17; Rebs: William 6 Asts: Romeo 3

Changsha Social Work College's gymnasium, Changsha
Referees: Marwan Egho (LIB), Arsen Andryuhskin (KAZ), Toru Katayose (JPN)

== See also ==
- 2014 Philippines national basketball team results

Preceded by 2014	Philippines national basketball team results 2015	Succeeded by 2016
