= 2014 Philippines men's national basketball team results =

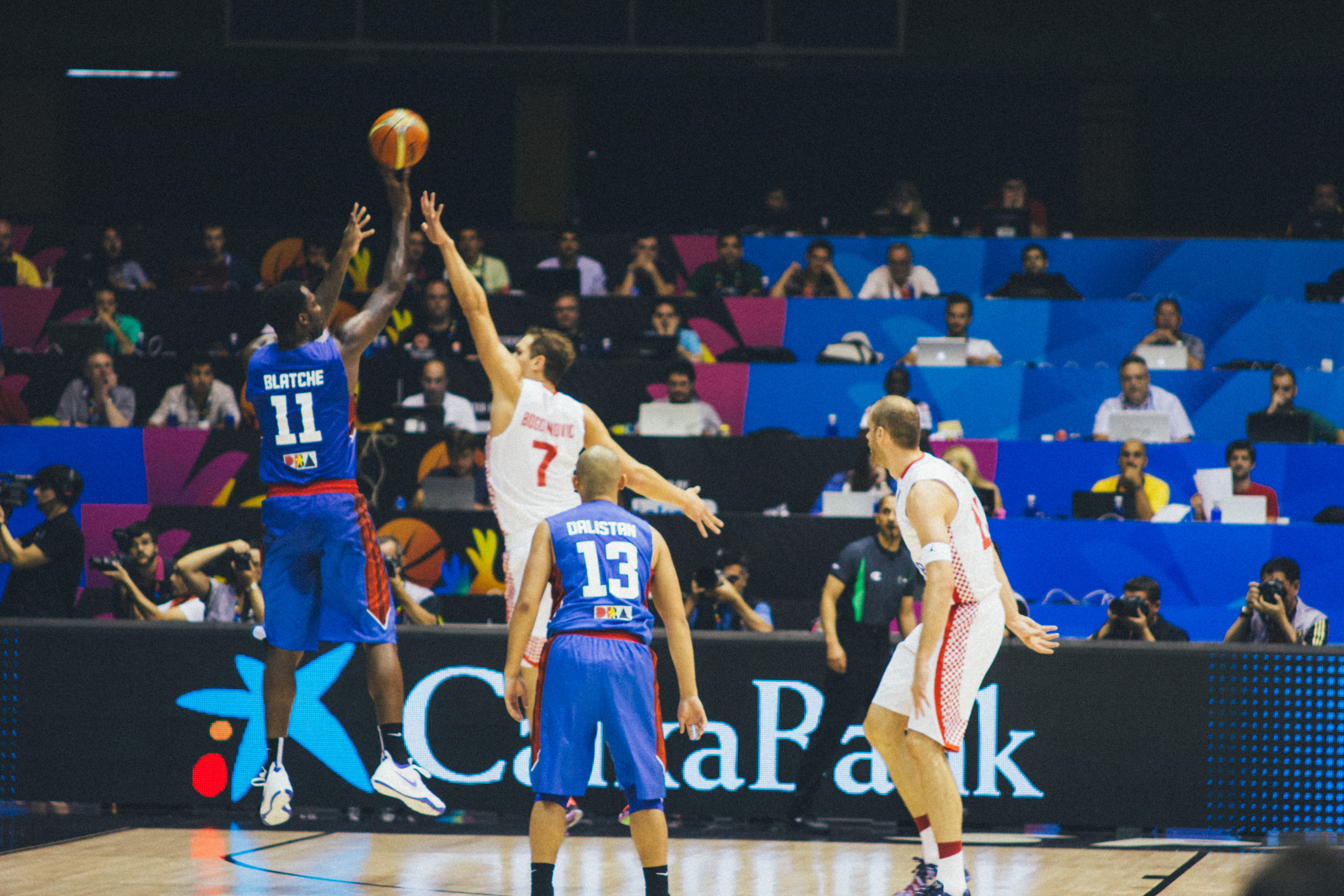
Philippines vs Croatia at the 2014 FIBA World Cup

The Philippines national basketball team in 2014 led by head coach Chot Reyes first tournament was the 2014 FIBA Asia Cup where they managed to finish third. The team had a series training camps in Miami in the United States, in Antibes, France where they participated in a pocket tournament, and Spain the host country of the FIBA World Cup. They returned to the FIBA World Cup after 36 years last participating in the 1978 edition. The national team did not get past the group stage with only a lone win against Senegal. The win against Senegal was the Philippines first win at the FIBA World Cup since 1974. However the national team did not meet expectations at the Asian Games and failed to reach the medal round. Head Chot Reyes is later replaced by Tab Baldwin who assumed Reyes' former post the next year.

== Record ==
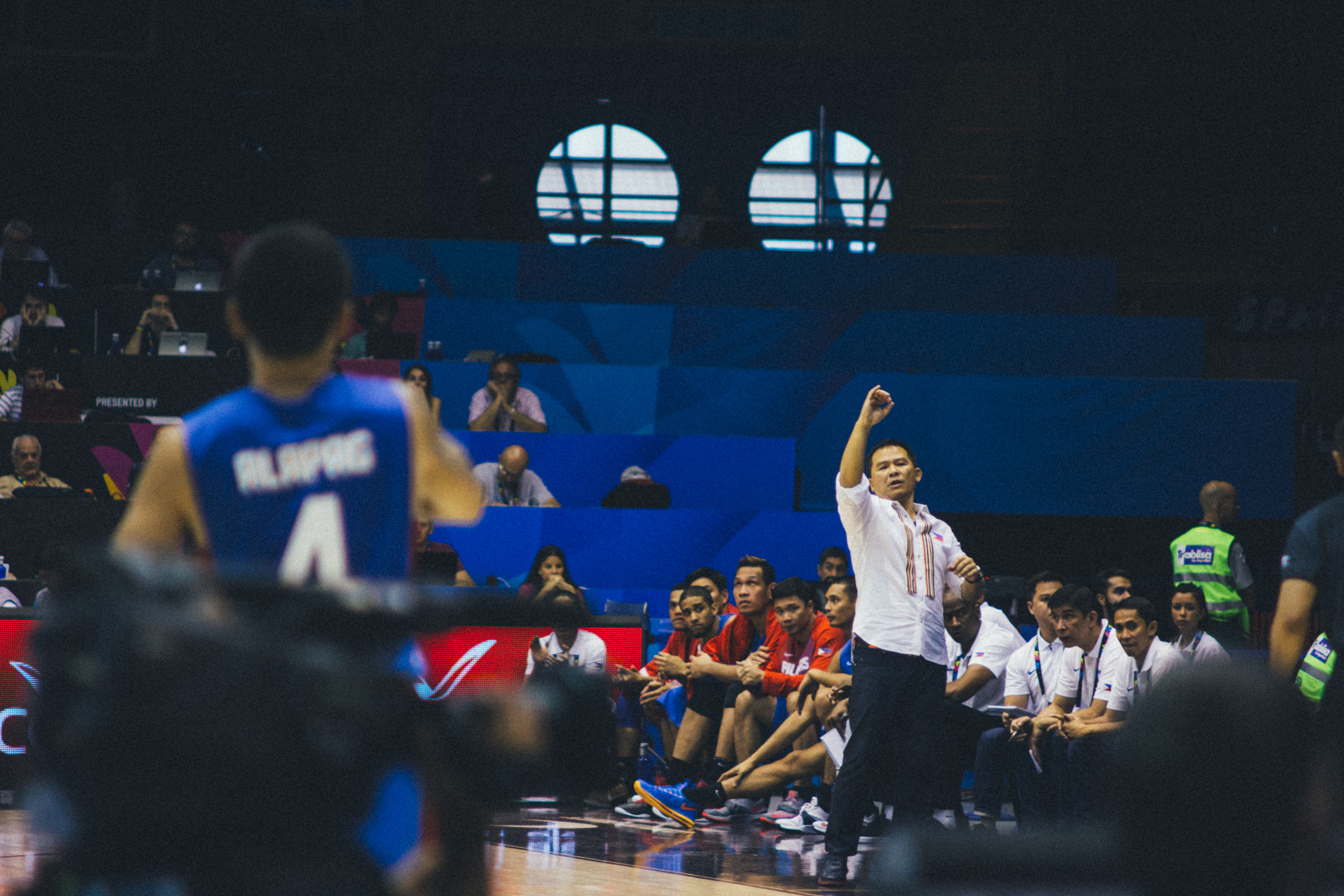
Head coach, Chot Reyes giving instructions to Jimmy Alapag

Competition	GP	W	L
2014 FIBA World Cup	5	1	4
2014 FIBA Asia Cup	6	5	1
2014 Asian Games	7	3	4
2014 Antibes International Basketball Tournament	3	0	3
Exhibition games	8	5	3
Total	29	14	15

== Uniforms ==
Philippines 1st Uniform
Philippines 2nd Uniform

== Tournaments ==
=== FIBA Asia Cup ===
==== Group stage ====
July 12
14:45 (UTC+8)

Report

Philippines	78–64	Chinese Taipei
Scoring by quarter: 20–10, 16–16, 11–24, 31–14
Pts: Lee 18; Rebs: Douthit 16; Asts: Lee, Tenorio 4		Pts: Hu L.M. 15; Rebs: Davis 9 Asts: Peng C.Y. 8

Wuhan Sprts Center Gymnasium, Wuhan
Referees: Marwan Egho (LIB), Haryanto Sutaryo (INA), Ceciline Michael Vino (IND)

July 14
14:45 (UTC+8)

Report

Philippines	74–57	Singapore
Scoring by quarter: 25–14, 18–17, 13–8, 18–18
Pts: David, Lee 10; Rebs: Belga 7 Asts: Alas, Lee 3		Pts: Ng H.B. 17; Rebs: Lim, Ng H.B. 8 Asts: 5 players 1

Wuhan Sports Center Gymnasium, Wuhan
Referees: Zhu Duan (CHN), Amirhossein Safarzadeh (IRI), Ceciline Michael Vino (IND)

July 15
17:15 (UTC+8)

Report

Jordan	70–71	Philippines
Scoring by quarter: 12–17, 18–13, 22–19, 18–22
Pts: Al-Sous 14; Rebs: Al Dwairi 13; Asts: Al Hamarsheh, Eid 3		Pts: Lee 16; Rebs: Douthit 9 Asts: De Ocampo 2

Wuhan Sports Center Gymnasium, Wuhan
Referees: Marwan Egho (LIB), Snehal Bendke (IND), Mei Wang (CHN)

==== Quarterfinals ====
July 17
17:15 (UTC+8)

Report

Philippines	70–66	India
Scoring by quarter: 20–17, 25–16, 15–14, 10–19
Pts: Lee 15; Rebs: Douthit 12; Asts: Lee 3		Pts: Singh Amr. 20; Rebs: Singh Amr., Singh Amj. 10; Asts: Singh P. 4

Wuhan Sports Center Gymnasium, Wuhan
Referees: Arsen Andryushkin (KAZ), Ying-Cheng Chen (TPE), Zhu Duan (CHN)

==== Semifinals ====
July 18
17:15 (UTC+8)

Report

Philippines	55–76	Iran
Scoring by quarter: 13–20, 15–19, 16–22, 11–15
Pts: David, De Ocampo, Tenorio 11; Rebs: De Ocampo, Douthit 8 Asts: Aguilar, Belga, David, Douthit, Lee 1		Pts: Jamshidi 19; Rebs: Sahakian 9 Asts: Haddadi 9

Wuhan Sports Center Gymnasium, Wuhan
Referees: Arsen Andryushkin (KAZ), Naser Mohammad Ramadan Abu Rashed (JOR), Naohiko Uchihara (JPN)

==== 3rd place ====
July 19
17:15 (UTC+8)

Report

China	79–80	Philippines
Scoring by quarter: 24–15, 20–23, 18–22, 17–20
Pts: Makan 23; Rebs: Zhou 5 Asts: Wang 5		Pts: De Ocampo 18; Rebs: Douthit 22; Asts: Tenorio 4

Wuhan Sports Center Gymnasium, Wuhan
Referees: Marwan Egho(LIB), Snehal Bendke (IND), Amirhossein Safarzadeh (IRI)

=== Antibes International Basketball Tournament ===
August 15
20:30 (UTC+2)

Report

France	75–68	Philippines
Scoring by quarter: 22–20, 13–19, 17–16, 23–13
Pts: Batum 16; Rebs: Batum 11; Asts: Diot 6		Pts: Blatche, Lee 12; Rebs: Blatche 7 Asts: Blatche, Norwood, Tenorio 2

Azur Arena, Antibes, France
Referees: Luigi Lamonica (ITA), Fernando Rocha (POR), Milija Vojinovic (SRB)

August 16
18:00 (UTC+2)

Report

Philippines	75–97	Australia
Scoring by quarter: 17–20, 25–27, 21–26, 12–24
Pts: Blatche 20; Rebs: Blatche 10; Asts: Alapag, Tenorio 3		Pts: Baynes 15; Rebs: Motum 12; Asts: Exum 6

Azur Arena, Antibes, France
Referees: Joseph Bissang (FRA), David Chambon (FRA), Abdel Hamzaoui (FRA)

August 17
18:00 (UTC+2)

Report

Ukraine	114–64	Philippines
Scoring by quarter: 21–16, 40–19, 22–13, 31–16
Pts: Lypovyy 16; Rebs: Lypovyy 8 Asts: Mishula 9		Pts: De Ocampo 11; Rebs: Douthit 8 Asts: Norwood 3

Azur Arena, Antibes, France
Referees: Joseph Bissang (FRA), David Chambon (FRA), Abdel Hamzaoui (FRA)

=== FIBA World Cup ===
==== Group stage ====
August 30
12:30 (UTC+2)

Boxscore

Croatia	81–78 (OT)	Philippines
Scoring by quarter: 23–9, 14–22, 20–18, 14–22, Overtime: 10–7
Pts: Bogdanović 26; Rebs: Tomić 11; Asts: Tomić, Šarić 4		Pts: Blatche 28; Rebs: Blatche 12; Asts: Alapag 6

Palacio Municipal de Deportes San Pablo, Seville
Attendance: 3,500
Referees: José Reyes (MEX), Mohammad Al-Amiri (KUW), Fernando Rocha (POR)

August 31
20:00 (UTC+2)

Boxscore

Philippines	70–82	Greece
Scoring by quarter: 10–20, 17–17, 18–21, 25–24
Pts: Blatche 21; Rebs: Blatche 14; Asts: Alapag 3		Pts: Printezis 25; Rebs: Bourousis 10; Asts: Papanikolaou 4

Palacio Municipal de Deportes San Pablo, Seville
Attendance: 5,554
Referees: Luigi Lamonica (ITA), Mohammad Al-Amiri (KUW), Stephen Seibel (CAN)

September 1
17:30 (UTC+2)

Boxscore

Argentina	85–81	Philippines
Scoring by quarter: 22–25, 21–13, 28–23, 14–20
Pts: Scola 19; Rebs: Mata 9 Asts: Scola, Campazzo 4		Pts: De Ocampo 18; Rebs: Blatche 15; Asts: Castro, Alapag 2

Palacio Municipal de Deportes San Pablo, Seville
Attendance: 6,071
Referees: Ilija Belošević (SRB), Juan González (ESP), Carlos Julio (ANG)

September 3
13:30 (UTC+2)

Boxscore

Philippines	73–77	Puerto Rico
Scoring by quarter: 25–13, 19–26, 13–22, 16–16
Pts: Blatche 25; Rebs: Blatche 14; Asts: De Ocampo 3		Pts: Barea 30; Rebs: Franklin 9 Asts: Rivera 3

Palacio Municipal de Deportes San Pablo, Seville
Attendance: 4,998
Referees: José Reyes (MEX), Juan González (ESP), Carlos Julio (ANG)

September 4
14:00 (UTC+2)

Boxscore

Senegal	79–81 (OT)	Philippines
Scoring by quarter: 19–13, 5–24, 20–12, 20–15, Overtime: 15–17
Pts: Faye 20; Rebs: Dieng 14; Asts: D'Almeida 13		Pts: Blatche, Alapag 18; Rebs: Blatche 14; Asts: Alapag 4

Palacio Municipal de Deportes San Pablo, Seville
Attendance: 5,132
Referees: Ilija Belošević (SRB), Fernando Rocha (POR), Carlos Julio (ANG)

=== Asian Games ===
==== Group stage ====
September 23
14:00

Boxscore

Philippines	85–76	India
Scoring by quarter: 24–16, 26–21, 20–16, 15–23
Pts: Douthit, Chan 14; Rebs: Douthit 10; Asts: Alapag, Norwood 3		Pts: Amr. Singh 16; Rebs: Bhriguvanshi 6 Asts: Bhriguvanshi 5

Hwaseong Sports Complex, Hwaseong
Referees: Arsen Andryushkin (KAZ), Kijun Sung (KOR), Hsieh Wen Wei (TPE)

September 25
14:00

Boxscore

Iran	68–63	Philippines
Scoring by quarter: 29–17, 7–17, 14–19, 18–10
Pts: Nikkhah Bahrami 21; Rebs: Haddadi 15; Asts: Nikkhah Bahrami 5		Pts: Lee 11; Rebs: Douthit 10; Asts: Tenorio 2

Hwaseong Sports Complex, Hwaseong
Referees: Mansour Saeed Alahmari (KSA), Hwang Intae (KOR), Hsieh Wen Wei (TPE)

==== Quarterfinals - Group H ====
September 26
18:30

Boxscore

Philippines	68–77	Qatar
Scoring by quarter: 19–19, 20–17, 12–20, 17–21
Pts: Alapag 15; Rebs: Pingris 8 Asts: Alapag, De Ocampo 3		Pts: M.Y. Mohamed 19; Rebs: M.Y. Mohamed 8 Asts: Watson, El Hadary 3

Hwaseong Sports Complex, Hwaseong
Referees: Harja Jaladri (INA), Man Lei Si (MAC), Mohammadreza Salehian (IRI)

September 27
14:00

Boxscore

South Korea	97–95	Philippines
Scoring by quarter: 18–22, 26–29, 27–21, 26–23
Pts: Moon T.J. 38; Rebs: Oh S.K. 8 Asts: Kim T.S. 5		Pts: Alapag 25; Rebs: Fajardo 10; Asts: Norwood 5

Samsan World Gymnasium, Incheon
Referees: Mohammad Al-Amiri (KUW), Yang Hongfeng (CHN), Mohammad Reza Salehian (IRI)

September 28
15:15

Boxscore

Philippines	67–65	Kazakhstan
Scoring by quarter: 14–8, 21–13, 17–18, 15–26
Pts: Douthit 18; Rebs: Douthit 14; Asts: three players 2		Pts: Ilin 21; Rebs: Kolesnikov, Ponomarev 10; Asts: Ilin 4

Hwaseong Sports Complex, Hwaseong
Referees: Yuji Higashi (JPN), Girok Shin (KOR), Reza Azarafza (IRI)

==== Classification round ====
September 29
16:15

Boxscore

China	78–71	Philippines
Scoring by quarter: 21–17, 21–17, 23–19, 13–18
Pts: Liu 16; Rebs: Zhou Q. 9 Asts: Liu 5		Pts: Douthit 24; Rebs: Tenorio 10; Asts: Tenorio 3

Hwaseong Sports Complex, Hwaseong
Referees: Mohammad Alamiri (KUW), Jongkuk Kim (KOR), Mohammadreza Salehian (IRI)

October 1
15:15

Boxscore

Mongolia	68–84	Philippines
Scoring by quarter: 21–18, 9–20, 25–25, 13–21
Pts: Battuvshin 18; Rebs: Davaasambuu 7 Asts: Otgonbaatar 4		Pts: De Ocampo 25; Rebs: Fajardo 12; Asts: De Ocampo 7

Hwaseong Sports Complex, Hwaseong
Referees: Reza Azarafza (IRI), Seungmu Lee (KOR), Kyoungjin Park (KOR)

== Exhibition games ==
August 2

Miami Pro-Am Selection (United States)	74–95	Philippines

Miami

August 3

Elev8 Sports Institute (United States)	84–93	Philippines

Miami

August 10

Liga ACB Selection (Spain)	58–89	Philippines
Scoring by quarter: 16–23, 15–27, 11–17, 16–22
Pts: Hernangomez 12		Pts: Blatche 18

Vitoria-Gasteiz

August 19
20:30 (UTC+2)

Basque Country (Basque Country (autonomous community))	75–66	Philippines
Scoring by quarter: 23–12, 20–12, 14–15, 18–27
Pts: Cortaberria 14; Rebs: M. Uriz 7 Asts: Cortareberria 4		Pts: Blatche 19; Rebs: Pingris 9 Asts: Alapag 2

Polideportivo Municipal J.A. Gasca, San Sebastián
Referees: Antonio Sacristán, Rubén Sánchez, Paul Urbano

August 21

Philippines	74–83	Angola
Scoring by quarter: 17–17, 17–26, 16–21, 24–19
Pts: Blatche 33		Pts: Cipriano 29

San Sebastián

August 24

Philippines	74–65	Egypt
Pts: Chan 20

Palacio Multiusos, Guadalajara
Attendance: 3,500+

August 26

Philippines	79–86	Dominican Republic
Scoring by quarter: 21–21, 23–27, 9–9, 26–29
Pts: Norwood 17		Pts: Feldeine 15

Palacio Multiusos, Guadalajara

Preceded by 2013	Philippines national basketball team results 2014	Succeeded by 2015
