= 2016 Imperial Basketball City Tournament =

Tournament details
- Host country: Italy
- Dates: 25–26 June
- Teams: 4
- Venue(s): 1 (in 1 host city)

Final positions
- Champions: Canada

Tournament statistics
- MVP: (Canada) Khem Birch

The 2016 Imperial Basketball City Tournament was a four nation international basketball tournament held in Bologna, Italy. All matches of the tournament scheduled from 25 to 26 June 2016 was hosted at the Land Rover Arena.

The tournament follows a Single-elimination tournament with the winners of the initial two matches to contest at the final and the losers to participate at the 3rd place match.

== Results ==
Times listed are local (UTC+2:00)

Semifinals
25 June
Canada	95
China	69
25 June
Italy	106
Philippines	70

Final
26 June
Canada	74
Italy	71
3rd place match
26 June
China	69
Philippines	72

=== Semifinals ===
25 June
18:00

Boxscore

Canada	95–69	China
Scoring by quarter: 23–8, 23–23, 21–20, 28–18
Pts: Heslip 33; Rebs: Birch 10; Asts: Ejim, Scrubb 5		Pts: Yi 22; Rebs: Wang 8 Asts: Guo 6

Land Rover Arena, Bologna
Referees: Gianluca Mattioli (ITA), Saverio Lanzarini (ITA), Alessandro Martolini (ITA)

25 June
20:30

Boxscore

Italy	106–70	Philippines
Scoring by quarter: 40–7, 24–16, 24–27 , 18–20
Pts: Gallinari 20; Rebs: Aradori 7 Asts: Hackett 5		Pts: Blatche 21; Rebs: Blatche 6 Asts: Blatche 4

Land Rover Arena, Bologna
Referees: Alessandro Vicino (ITA), Luca Weidmann (ITA), Federico Di Francesco (ITA)

=== Third place match ===
26 June
18:00

Boxscore

China	69–72	Philippines
Scoring by quarter: 23–22, 11–12, 17–20, 18–18
Pts: Zhou P. 18; Rebs: Zhou P. 10; Asts: Li G., Zhou P. 4		Pts: Romeo 18; Rebs: Blatche 12; Asts: Blatche, Chan, Parks Jr. 2

Land Rover Arena, Bologna
Referees: Gianluca Mattioli (ITA), Alessandro Martolini (ITA), Federico Di Francesco (ITA)

=== Final ===
26 June
20:45

Boxscore

Canada	74–71 (OT)	Italy
Scoring by quarter: 19–16, 14–15, 14–13, 14–17, Overtime: 13–10
Pts: Scrubb 18; Rebs: Birch 11; Asts: Ennis 8		Pts: Gallinari, Gentile 16; Rebs: Datome, Gallinari 5 Asts: Cinciarini, Della Valle, Gallinari 2

Land Rover Arena, Bologna
Referees: Saverio Lanzarini (ITA), Alessandro Vicino (ITA), Luca Weidmann (ITA)
