= Mike Myers (basketball) =

American basketball player

Michael Myers
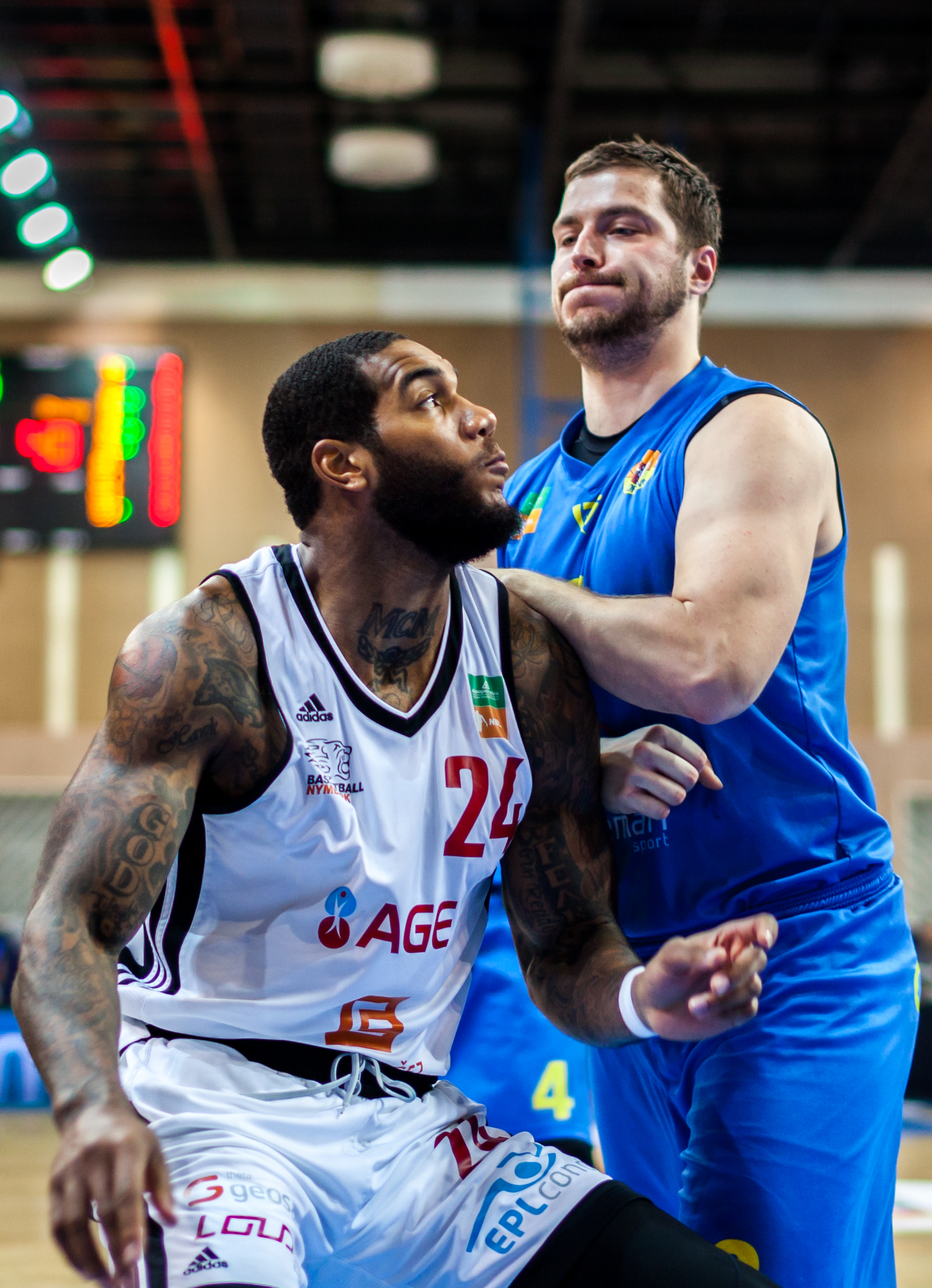

No. 24 – Lobos de Puebla
- Position: Center
- League: LNBP

Personal information
- Born: July 2, 1992 (age 34) Camden, New Jersey, U.S.
- Listed height: 6 ft 9 in (2.06 m)
- Listed weight: 239 lb (108 kg)

Career information
- High school: Camden
- College: Angelina (2011–2013); UMES Hawks (2013–2015)
- NBA draft: 2015: undrafted
- Playing career: 2015–present

Career history
- 2015: Helsinki Seagulls
- 2015: Rapla
- 2015–2016: JSA Bordeaux
- 2016–2017: Mens Sana Siena
- 2017–2018: Oostende
- 2018–2019: Nymburk
- 2019–2021: Prometey
- 2021–2022: Suwon KT Sonicboom
- 2022–2023: Astana
- 2023: Ionikos Nikaias
- 2023–2024: Esenler Erokspor
- 2024–2025: Trepça
- 2025: Dorados de Chihuahua
- 2025: Büyükçekmece
- 2026: Toros Laguna
- 2026–present: Lobos de Puebla

Career highlights
- Kosovo Superleague champion (2025); Kosovo Superleague Finals MVP (2025); Kosovo Cup winner (2025); Ukrainian League champion (2021); Czech League champion (2019); Czech Cup winner (2019); Belgian League champion (2018); Belgian Cup winner (2018)

Michael Charles Myers (born July 2, 1992) is an American professional basketball player for Lobos de Puebla of the Liga Nacional de Baloncesto Profesional (LNBP). He played college basketball for the UMES Hawks. Myers has played in several countries.

== Professional career ==
=== Büyükçekmece Basketbol (2025–present) ===
On November 14, 2025, he signed with ONVO Büyükçekmece of the Basketbol Süper Ligi (BSL).
