= Almond Vosotros =

Filipino basketball player

Free agent
- Position: Point guard / shooting guard

Personal information
- Born: January 26, 1990 (age 36) Albay, Philippines
- Listed height: 5 ft 10 in (1.78 m)
- Listed weight: 165 lb (75 kg)

Career information
- High school: San Sebastian (Manila)
- College: De La Salle
- PBA draft: 2015: 2nd round, 13th overall pick
- Drafted by: Blackwater Elite
- Playing career: 2015–present

Career history
- 2015–2016: Blackwater Elite
- 2018: Mono Thewphaingarm
- 2018: PEA
- 2018–2019: Caloocan Supremos
- 2019–2020, 2024–2025: TNT Tropang Giga/5G

Career highlights
- PBA champion (2024 Governors'); PBA All-Star (2017); MPBL All-Star (2019); UAAP champion (2013); PCCL champion (2013)
Medals
Men's basketball
Philippines
SEABA Championship
Gold medal – first place	2015 Singapore	Team
SEABA Cup
Gold medal – first place	2016 Bangkok	Team
SEA Games
Gold medal – first place	2015 Singapore	Team
Gold medal – first place	2017 Kuala Lumpur	Team
Men's 3x3 basketball
Philippines
SEA Games
Silver medal – second place	2023 Phnom Penh	Team

Almond Pineda Vosotros (born January 26, 1990) is a Filipino professional basketball player who last played for the TNT Tropang 5G of the Philippine Basketball Association (PBA). In 2018, he signed with Mono Thewphaingarm of the GSB Thailand Basketball Super League. After the season ended, he signed with PEA of the Thailand Basketball League.

== High school career ==
Vosotros studied at San Sebastian College – Recoletos de Manila. He played a pivotal role in the Staglets’ historic fourth straight NCAA championship in 2008.

== College career ==
Vosotros played collegiate basketball at DLSU where he first suited up for the Archers in 2010 and first earned his reputation as a clutch player. In his sophomore season with the Archers, he averaged 6.8 ppg while developing into a deadly shooter from three-point range. The following season, he earned the starting "two" spot and became the team's second leading scorer with 10.5 points per outing, while converting 29 team-best three-point conversions. In 2013, he posted averages of 14 points (second behind Jeron Teng), five rebounds, two assists and one steal per game, while leading the Archers to their first championship since 2007. He also steered the Archers to the PCCL championship that same year. He last played for La Salle in 2014.

== Amateur career ==
Vosotros suited up for the Cebuana Lhuillier Gems in the PBA D-League, where he scored a career-high 26 points in 2014.

== Professional career ==
Vosotros was drafted by the Blackwater Elite with the 13th overall pick in the 2015 PBA draft. He signed a two-year rookie contract with the Elite.

On May 30, 2025, Vosotros returns to active line-up of TNT Tropang 5G. On the very same day Vosotros named Best Player of the Game versus NorthPort Batang Pier scoring 12 points 4/7 from the three point line.

== PBA career statistics ==
Legend
GP	Games played	MPG	Minutes per game	FG%	Field-goal percentage
3FG%	3-point field-goal percentage	4P%	4-point field-goal percentage	FT%	Free-throw percentage
RPG	Rebounds per game	APG	Assists per game	SPG	Steals per game
BPG	Blocks per game	PPG	Points per game	127	Career high

As of the end of 2024–25 season

=== Season-by-season averages ===
Year	Team	GP	MPG	FG%	3P%	4P%	FT%	RPG	APG	SPG	BPG	PPG
2015–16	Blackwater	13	7.9	.308	.143	—	—	.5	.6	.2	.1	1.4
2019	TNT	15	9.4	.406	.417	—	1.000	1.1	1.0	.2	—	2.3
2020	TNT	14	6.4	.387	.200	—	.000	.7	.5	.2	—	1.9
2024–25	TNT	21	9.2	.418	.414	.000	.667	.6	.4	.2	.0	4.5
Career		63	8.3	.393	.343	.000	.727	.7	.6	.2	.0	2.8

== International career ==
Vosotros was a member of the 12-man Sinag Pilipinas national team that competed in the 2015 Southeast Asian Games basketball tournament and 2015 SEABA Championship, both held in Singapore, where they won gold medals in both occasions.
