= Quincy Davis (basketball) =

Taiwanese basketball player

Quincy Davis III
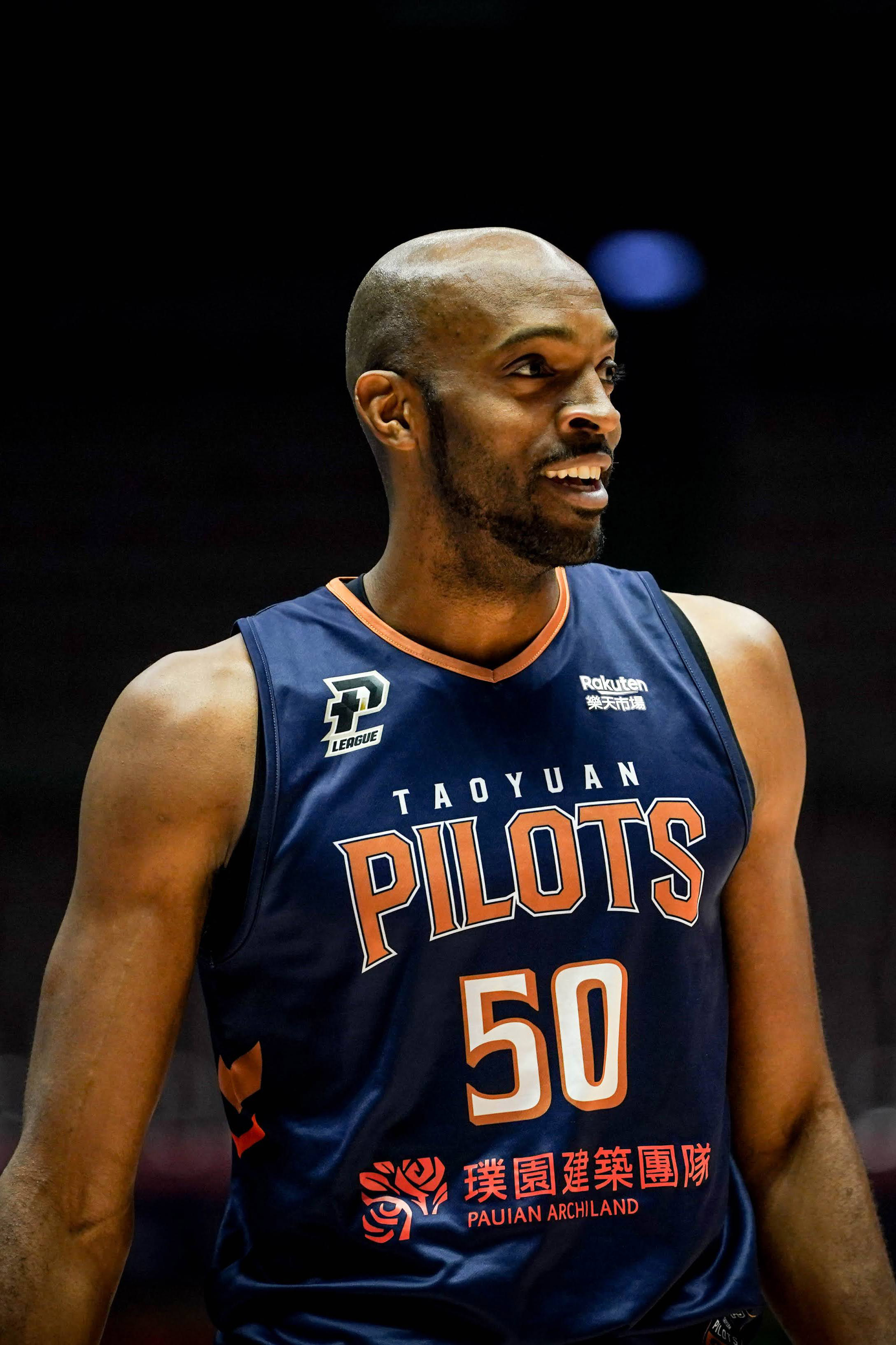
- Davis with the Taoyuan Pilots in 2021

Free Agent
- Position: Power forward / center

Personal information
- Born: 16 February 1983 (age 43) Los Angeles, California, U.S.
- Listed height: 6 ft 8 in (2.03 m)
- Listed weight: 251 lb (114 kg)

Career information
- High school: McGill–Toolen (Mobile, Alabama)
- College: Tulane (2002–2006)
- NBA draft: 2006: undrafted
- Playing career: 2006–present

Career history
- 2006–2007: ETHA Engomis
- 2007–2008: Belenenses Montepio
- 2008–2009: Deportivo Táchira BBC
- 2010: Jiangsu Dragons
- 2011: Bornova Belediye
- 2011–2018: Pure Youth
- 2020–2021: Taoyuan Pilots
- 2021–2024: New Taipei Kings
- 2025–2026: Yankey Ark
- 2026: New Taipei Kings

Career highlights
- P. League+ champion (2024)
Medals
Representing Chinese Taipei
FIBA Asia Challenge
Silver medal – second place	2014 Wuhan	Team
William Jones Cup
Silver medal – second place	2013 Taipei	Team
Silver medal – second place	2014 Taipei	Team
Bronze medal – third place	2015 Taipei	Team
Bronze medal – third place	2016 Taipei	Team
EABA Championship
Gold medal – first place	2017 Nagano	Team
East Asian Games
Gold medal – first place	2013 Tianjin	Team

Quincy Davis
- Traditional Chinese: 戴維斯
- Simplified Chinese: 戴维斯
Transcriptions
Standard Mandarin
- Hanyu Pinyin: Dàiwéisī
- Bopomofo: ㄉㄞˋ ㄨㄟˊ ㄙ
- Wade–Giles: Tai4-wei2-ssŭ1

Quincy Spencer Davis III (Chinese: 戴維斯; born 16 February 1983) is an American-born Taiwanese professional basketball player who last played for the New Taipei Kings of the Basketball Champions League Asia (BCL Asia). He renounced his U.S. citizenship in June 2013 to naturalize in Taiwan so that he could play for the Chinese Taipei national team in international competition.

== Childhood and education ==
Davis was born in Los Angeles, California in an African American family. He graduated from McGill–Toolen Catholic High School in Mobile, Alabama in 2002 before going on to Tulane University, where he played for Tulane Green Wave men's basketball. As a freshman, in a game against the University of Southern Mississippi he matched the school record for single-game field goal percentage. In his four-year career there until 2006, he scored a total of 1,106 points, including 56 games with more than 10 points and 12 with more than 20. He collected 559 rebounds, including 226 offensive rebounds, making him one of just fourteen players in school history to achieve both a thousand points and five hundred rebounds. He also set the school record with a .577 career field goal percentage.

== Early career ==
Davis first went overseas to play for ETHA Engomis in Cyprus in 2006. The next season, he played in Portugal. In February 2008 he signed with Deportivo Táchira, a Liga Profesional de Baloncesto team in Venezuela. There, he appeared in eight games, averaging 5.5 points per game. The following year, he moved to mainland China to play in the National Basketball League. After his next season in Turkey, he came to Taiwan to join Pure-Youth Construction in the Super Basketball League. In March 2012, he won SBL's Player of the Month award for leading his team to a 6–1 record that month with an average of 20.1 points, 14 rebounds, 1.9 blocks, two assists, and 1.4 steals per game.

Davis also became a partner in Coast To Coast Basketball, a basketball instruction institute founded in 2007 by fellow expatriate player Edward Hardy II.

== Naturalization in Taiwan ==
The suggestion that Davis join the Chinese Taipei national team was first floated in January 2013 at the SBL 2012 MVP award ceremony. At the time, Davis stated that he was open to the idea of naturalizing as a Republic of China citizen so he could represent Taiwan in international competition. He said that of all the places in which he had played basketball, he felt happiest in Taiwan. However, naturalization would require him to renounce his U.S. citizenship, as Taiwan allows multiple citizenship only for its own citizens who have emigrated, and not for immigrants applying to become new citizens. Furthermore, as Davis did not meet the ordinary residence requirements for naturalization and his case would thus be processed by special dispensation, Taiwan sports officials also had to lobby for the support of the Ministry of the Interior. Contract length and salary negotiations introduced further delays, until in May 2013 it was announced that Davis had agreed to a US$20,000/month, two-year contract and had officially applied for naturalization.

On 25 June 2013, Davis went to the American Institute in Taiwan, the de facto U.S. embassy, to renounce his citizenship. The AIT processed his case and he received his Certificate of Loss of Nationality three days later, temporarily making him a stateless person. He was officially naturalized as a citizen of the Republic of China on 9 July.

== Later career ==
Davis played with the Chinese Taipei team in an exhibition game against visiting National Basketball Association players from his former country on 29 June, scoring 25 points. He then represented the Chinese Taipei team in the 2013 William Jones Cup and in the FIBA Championship 2013, where he scored an average of 14.7 points per game. Davis led the team to second place in the 2014 FIBA Asia Cup, scoring 19 points and grabbing 12 rebounds in the final game against Iran. Davis was barred from participating in the 2014 Asian Games because he had not fulfilled the residency requirements to represent Taiwan as a naturalized citizen.

In 2022, P. League+ announced it would reconsider its policies towards naturalized players; it was rumored that Davis would have his status in the league changed to "foreign player" from local, which he found shocking and later stated made him consider retirement. After a meeting was held by the board of directors, the league announced that he would continue to be treated as a local player for the 2023 season.

In 2023-24 season, he was suspended twice due to domestic violence charges. In March 2021, he was sentenced to 30 days in prison. He was suspended for the first 20 matches of the season by P. League+ and was fined NT$35,000. He was found guilty on April 9, 2024 after first reading. He was then suspended for the rest of the season (including playoffs) from that day onwards.

On March 13, 2026, Davis returned to the New Taipei Kings of the East Asia Super League (EASL).

== Personal life ==
Davis was married to a Taiwanese national. The couple separated, then finalized their divorce in September 2022. His former wife later filed a protection order against Davis. The pair were involved in an altercation in May 2023, and Davis was originally found guilty of assault. Upon appeal, the ruling was changed to negligent injury.

Davis is a vegan, and opened Uncle Q, a vegan restaurant in Taipei at the end of 2019. The restaurant primarily serves American style food.

== See also ==
- List of former United States citizens who relinquished their nationality
