= Andray Blatche =

American-Filipino basketball player (born 1986)

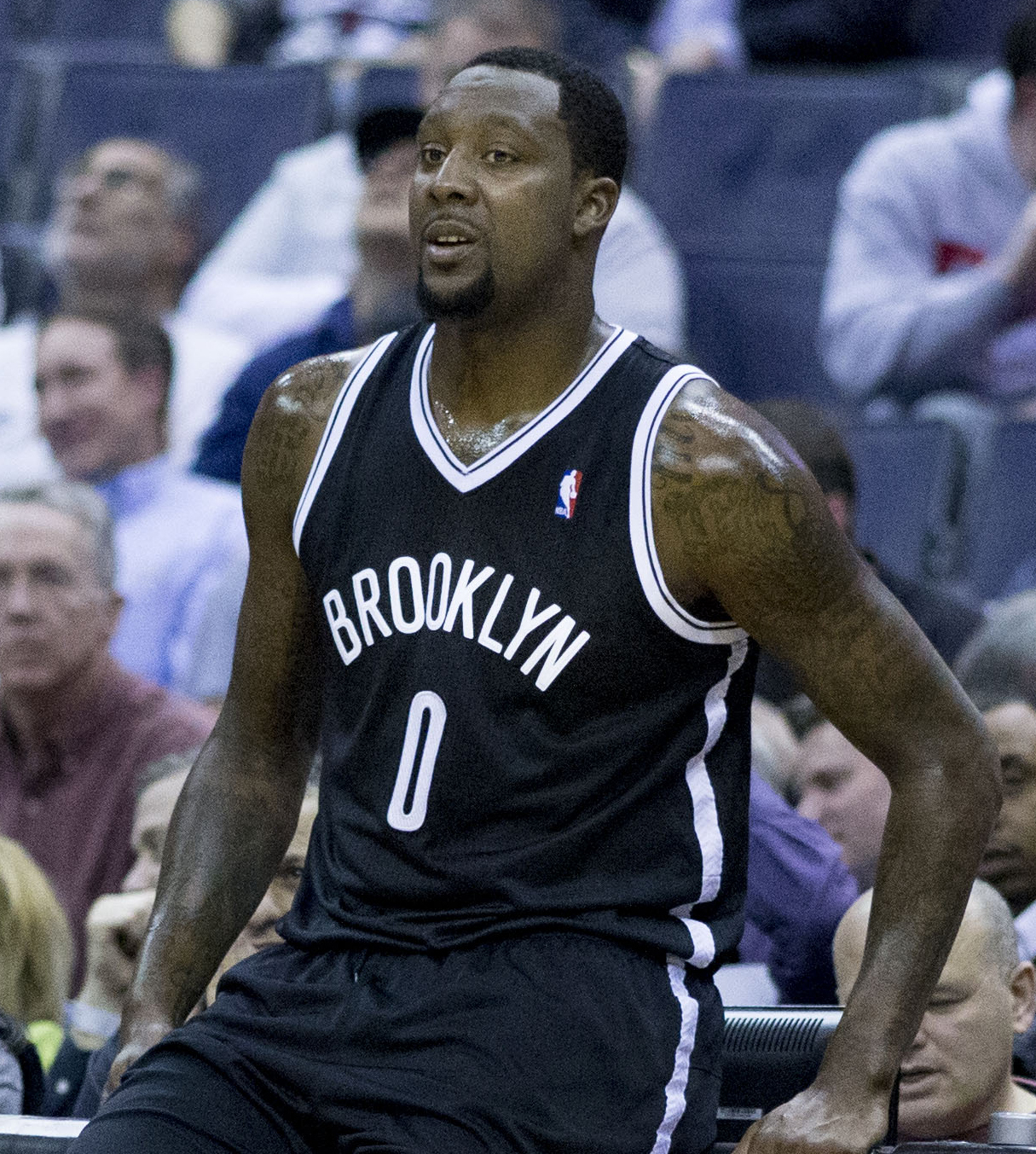
- Blatche with the Brooklyn Nets in 2014

Personal information
- Born: August 22, 1986 (age 40) Syracuse, New York, U.S.
- Listed height: 6 ft 11 in (2.11 m)
- Listed weight: 260 lb (118 kg)

Career information
- High school: Henninger (Syracuse, New York); South Kent School (South Kent, Connecticut)
- NBA draft: 2005: 2nd round, 49th overall pick
- Drafted by: Washington Wizards
- Playing career: 2005–2019
- Position: Power forward / center
- Number: 32, 7, 0

Career history
- 2005–2012: Washington Wizards
- 2005–2006: →Roanoke Dazzle
- 2012–2014: Brooklyn Nets
- 2014–2018: Xinjiang Flying Tigers
- 2018–2019: Tianjin Gold Lions

Career highlights
- CBA champion (2017); 2× CBA All-Star (2015, 2017)

Career statistics
- Points: 5,706 (10.1 ppg)
- Rebounds: 3,024 (5.4 rpg)
- Assists: 798 (1.4 apg)
- Stats at NBA.com
- Stats at Basketball Reference

Andray Maurice Blatche (born August 22, 1986) is an American-Filipino former professional basketball player. He played nine seasons in the National Basketball Association (NBA) between 2005 and 2014 before playing overseas. He played high school basketball at Henninger High School and South Kent School before he was drafted in the second round of the 2005 NBA draft by the Washington Wizards.

Born in New York and an American by birth, Blatche became a naturalized citizen of the Philippines in June 2014, enabling him to join the country's national basketball team.

== High school career ==
Blatche spent four years at Henninger High School in Syracuse, New York and then an extra year at the South Kent School in South Kent, Connecticut. He averaged 27.5 points, 16.0 rebounds and 6.0 blocks per game during his fifth-year campaign in 2004–05 as he guided South Kent to a 32–9 record.

Considered a five-star recruit by Rivals.com, Blatche was listed as the No. 2 power forward and the No. 4 player in the nation in 2005.

He declared for the 2005 NBA draft out of high school, and while originally thought of as a first-round prospect, he slipped to the second round and was taken by the Washington Wizards with the 49th overall pick.

== Professional career ==
=== Washington Wizards (2005–2012) ===
Blatche was shot in a carjacking on September 25, 2005, and as a result missed training camp. He recovered successfully and played his first game with Washington versus Seattle on November 11, 2005, scoring five points in a 137–96 Wizards victory. On December 14, 2005, he was assigned to the Roanoke Dazzle of the NBA Development League. On January 2, 2006, he was recalled by the Wizards. He finished the 2005–06 season only playing in 29 games for the Wizards, averaging 2.3 points and 1.3 rebounds.

With the injuries to Wizards' centers Etan Thomas and Michael Ruffin, Blatche was occasionally pressed into service as a backup center in the 2006–07 season. On August 17, 2007, Blatche re-signed with the Wizards to a multi-year deal. During the 2007–08 season, Blatche continued showing improvement, and with center Etan Thomas out with a season-ending heart condition, his minutes increased. At the end of the season, Blatche played in every game for the Wizards, starting 15, averaging 8.2 points, 5.2 rebounds and 1.4 blocks.

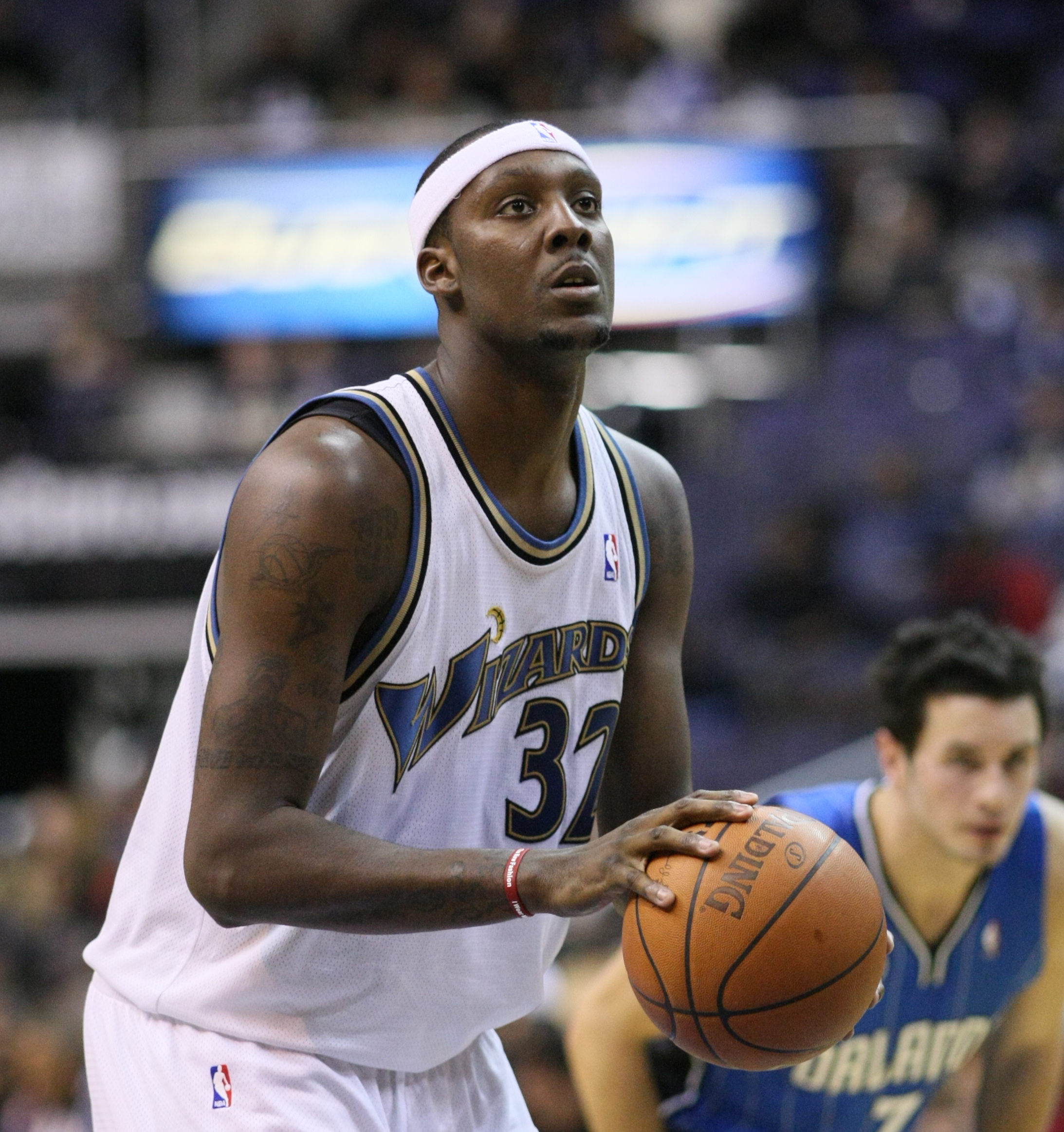
Blatche with the Wizards

On January 9, 2010, Blatche was fined $10,000 by the Wizards for participating in Gilbert Arenas' mimicking gunplay before a game on January 5, 2010, against the Philadelphia 76ers. Arenas was being investigated for a prior incident involving guns in the Wizards' locker room, but made light of the accusations by pointing his finger at his teammates, as if he were shooting them. His teammates were photographed smiling and laughing with him.

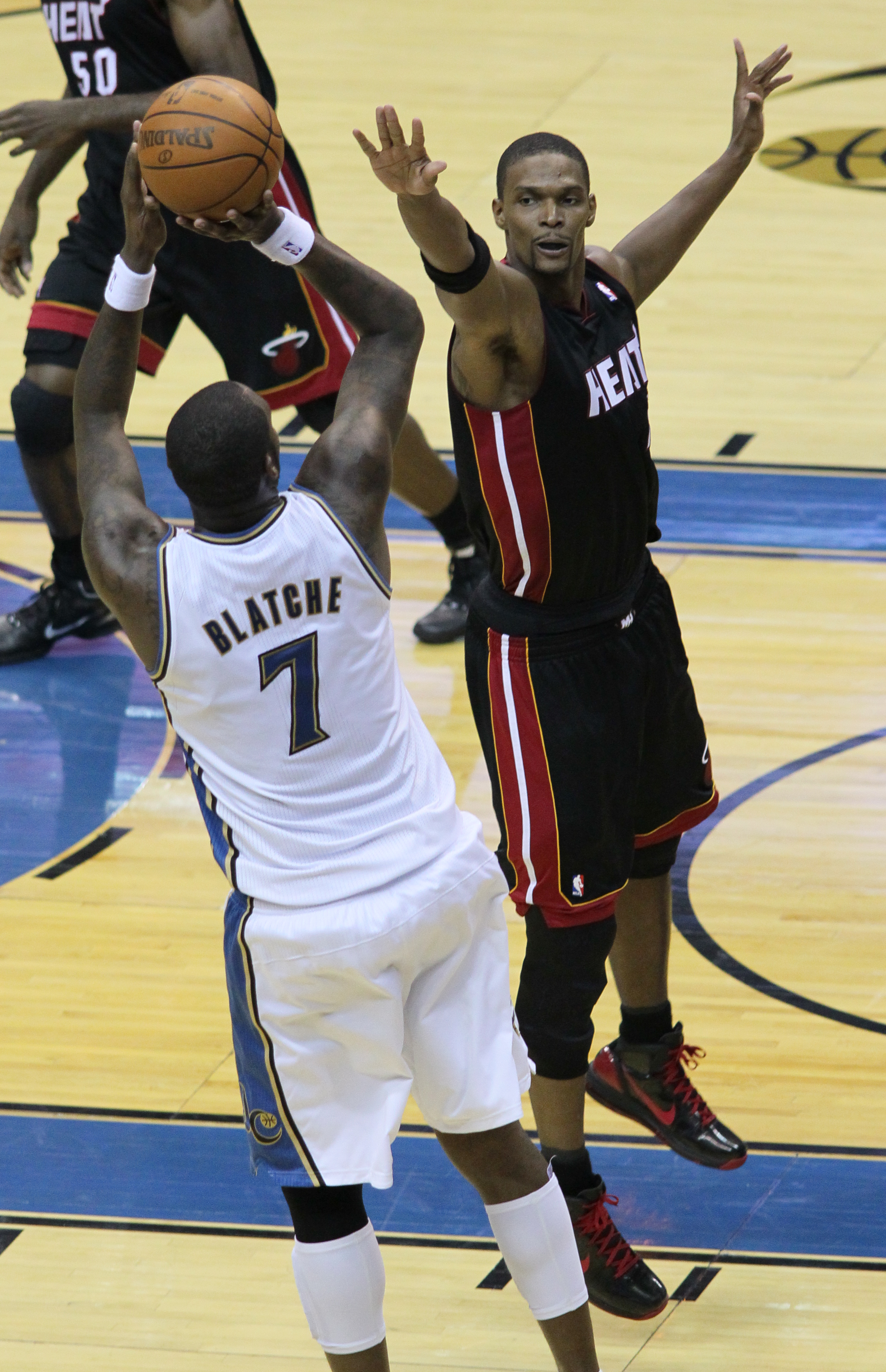
Blatche shooting over Chris Bosh

On February 28, 2010, he scored a career high 36 points on 17–31 shooting during the Wizards' 89–85 victory against the New Jersey Nets. Blatche continued to be the starter on the team, and his stats significantly improved. Blatche just missed a triple-double as he had 20 points, a career-high 13 assists, nine rebounds and two steals in the Wizards' 109–99 victory over the New Jersey Nets on April 4. In September 2010, he signed a veteran extension with the Wizards. The 2010–11 NBA season was a career year for Blatche, with 63 starts in 64 games played, and career highs in points (16.8), rebounds (8.2), assists (2.3) and steals (1.5).

On March 20, 2012, the Wizards announced that they were benching Blatche indefinitely due to lack of conditioning, and on July 16, he was waived via the amnesty clause. Blatche would later be vocal about his treatment by the Wizards organization, stating, "When things weren't starting well, they used me as an excuse." He also claimed that the management deliberately tried to ruin his career: "For them to say, ‘Oh, he's a bad teammate. He's a cancer in the locker room.’ He's this and that. All that was a bunch of lies! A bunch of lies. That's what really made me mad. That showed me, they tried to end me." Coach Randy Wittman responded to the allegations by saying, "I’m not going to get into that. We did everything we could to help him, as we will with every player that ever comes here."

=== Brooklyn Nets (2012–2014) ===
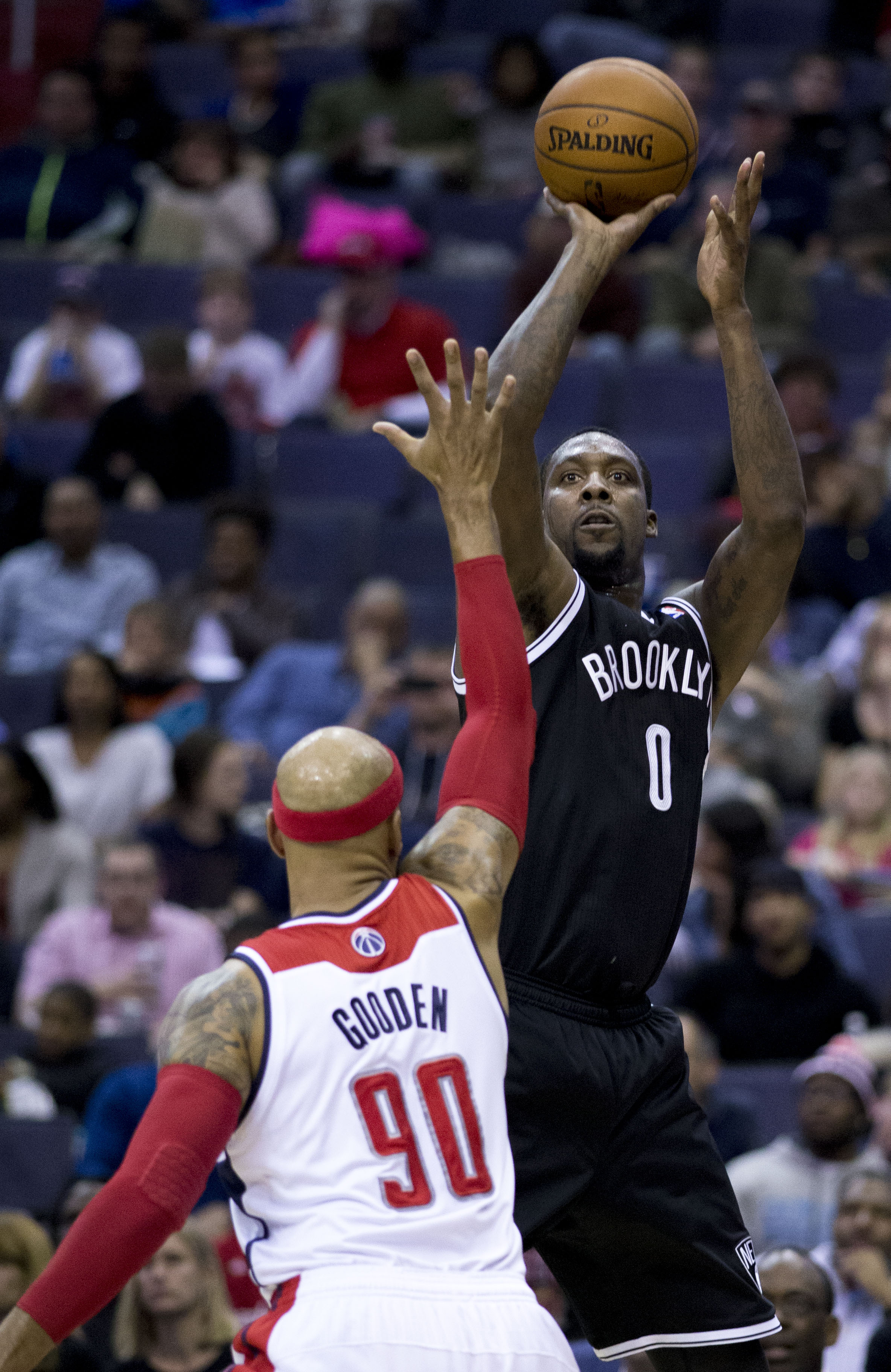
Blatche taking a jump shot over Drew Gooden.

On September 12, 2012, Blatche signed with the Brooklyn Nets. After Blatche signed with the Nets, he decided to wear number 0. "Zero reminds of me how everybody gave up on me", he said. When Brook Lopez injured his foot, Blatche was given the chance to start in his absence. Without Lopez, the Nets struggled with a 2–5 record. Despite the Nets' struggles without Lopez, Blatche played well, averaging 18.1 points and 8.8 rebounds. On January 4, 2013, Blatche made his return to the Verizon Center and was playing the Washington Wizards. When Blatche entered that game in the first quarter, he was booed heartily by the fans in attendance. In 19 minutes of game action, Blatche had 13 points and 12 rebounds.

Blatche played in all 82 regular season games in 2012–13, averaging 10.3 points and 5.1 rebounds and set a career high in field goal percentage (51.2%). Blatche also played in seven playoff games for the Nets and averaged 10.3 points and 4.9 rebounds.

On July 11, 2013, Blatche re-signed with the Nets. In December 2013, starting center Brook Lopez went down with a season-ending foot injury, increasing Blatche's minutes. In the first game without Lopez, Blatche had 11 points and seven rebounds in 25 minutes of action in a loss to the Indiana Pacers.

On June 20, 2014, Blatche opted out of his contract with the Nets, thus becoming an unrestricted free agent.

=== Xinjiang Flying Tigers (2014–2018) ===
On September 20, 2014, Blatche signed a one-year, $2.5 million contract with the Xinjiang Flying Tigers of the Chinese Basketball Association. Following the conclusion of the 2014–15 CBA regular season, Blatche terminated his contract with Xinjiang on February 1, 2015. In 38 games, he averaged 31.1 points, 14.6 rebounds, 5.1 assists and 2.8 steals per game.

In March 2015, Blatche re-signed with Xinjiang on a three-year, $7.5 million contract.

In November 2016, Blatche sustained an injury and was subsequently replaced on the roster temporarily by Ben Bentil. He returned to action in late December and went on to lead Xinjiang to the CBA Finals, where they swept the series against the Guangdong Southern Tigers 4–0 to claim the championship.

On January 4, 2018, it was announced that Augusto Lima was taking Blatche's spot on the roster. Blatche was criticized for his poor performance and negative attitude during the early stages of the 2017–18 season. He averaged 12.8 points and 6.4 rebounds in the five games he played, and had a negative impact on the team's defensive efforts. He returned to the team in March 2018 for their playoff series against Guangdong.

=== Tianjin Gold Lions (2018–2019) ===
In December 2018, Blatche signed with the Tianjin Gold Lions of the Chinese Basketball Association. In 19 games, he averaged 20.7 points, 11.0 rebounds, 4.1 assists, 1.7 steals and 1.8 blocks per game.

=== Later years (2020–2025) ===
Blatche played in the 2020 Dubai Basketball International Championship with non-league Philippine-based team Mighty Sports. He helped Mighty clinch the title in the club tournament held in the United Arab Emirates.

In 2021, he expressed interest to join the Philippine Basketball Association (PBA). Despite having Filipino citizenship by this time, naturalized players like himself are still considered as imports. Imports are also subject to height cap restriction.

Blatche joined Strong Group Athletics (SGA), another non-league Philippine-based side, for the Dubai International Basketball Championship in 2024. By this time Blatche has given up on his prospect of playing in the PBA. He rejoined SGA for the 2025 edition of the tournament. Blatche has announced his retirement in February 2025.

== Career statistics ==
Legend
GP	Games played	GS	Games started	MPG	Minutes per game
FG%	Field goal percentage	3P%	3-point field goal percentage	FT%	Free throw percentage
RPG	Rebounds per game	APG	Assists per game	SPG	Steals per game
BPG	Blocks per game	PPG	Points per game	**Bold**	Career high
*	Led the league

=== NBA ===
==== Regular season ====
Year	Team	GP	GS	MPG	FG%	3P%	FT%	RPG	APG	SPG	BPG	PPG
2005–06	Washington	29	0	6.0	.388	.231	**.833**	1.3	.3	.2	.2	2.2
2006–07	Washington	56	13	12.2	.437	.148	.612	3.4	.7	.3	.6	3.7
2007–08	Washington	**82***	15	20.4	.474	.231	.695	5.2	1.1	.6	**1.4**	7.5
2008–09	Washington	71	36	24.0	.471	.238	.704	5.3	1.7	.7	1.0	10.0
2009–10	Washington	81	36	27.9	.478	**.295**	.744	6.3	2.1	1.0	.9	14.1
2010–11	Washington	64	**63**	**33.9**	.445	.222	.777	**8.2**	**2.3**	**1.5**	.8	**16.8**
2011–12	Washington	26	13	24.1	.380	.286	.673	5.8	1.1	.8	.7	8.5
2012–13	Brooklyn	**82***	8	19.0	**.512**	.136	.685	5.1	1.0	1.0	.7	10.3
2013–14	Brooklyn	73	7	22.2	.476	.278	.742	5.3	1.5	1.0	.5	11.2
**Career**		564	191	22.1	.467	.237	.725	5.4	1.4	.9	.8	10.1

==== Playoffs ====
Year	Team	GP	GS	MPG	FG%	3P%	FT%	RPG	APG	SPG	BPG	PPG
2007	Washington	2	0	12.5	**.667**	.000	**1.000**	3.5	.0	.0	.0	4.5
2008	Washington	6	0	14.8	.429	.000	.333	3.3	.2	**.3**	**1.0**	3.7
2013	Brooklyn	7	0	**19.7**	.500	.000	.824	4.9	**1.3**	.3	.4	**10.3**
2014	Brooklyn	**12**	0	14.3	.448	.000	.833	**5.0**	.3	**.5**	.2	6.4
**Career**		27	0	15.7	.476	.000	.733	4.5	.5	.4	.4	6.7

=== CBA ===
Year	Team	GP	MPG	FG%	3P%	FT%	RPG	APG	SPG	BPG	PPG
2014–15	Xinjiang	38	**38.8**	**.558**	.372	**.777**	**14.6**	**5.1**	**2.8**	.9	**31.1**
2015–16	Xinjiang	**42**	31.8	.545	**.401**	.726	10.4	4.0	2.2	1.0	23.3
2016–17	Xinjiang	37	29.6	.532	.361	.719	10.4	3.6	2.3	**1.5**	22.5
**Career**		117	33.4	.546	.378	.743	10.91	4.3	2.4	1.1	25.6

== National team career ==
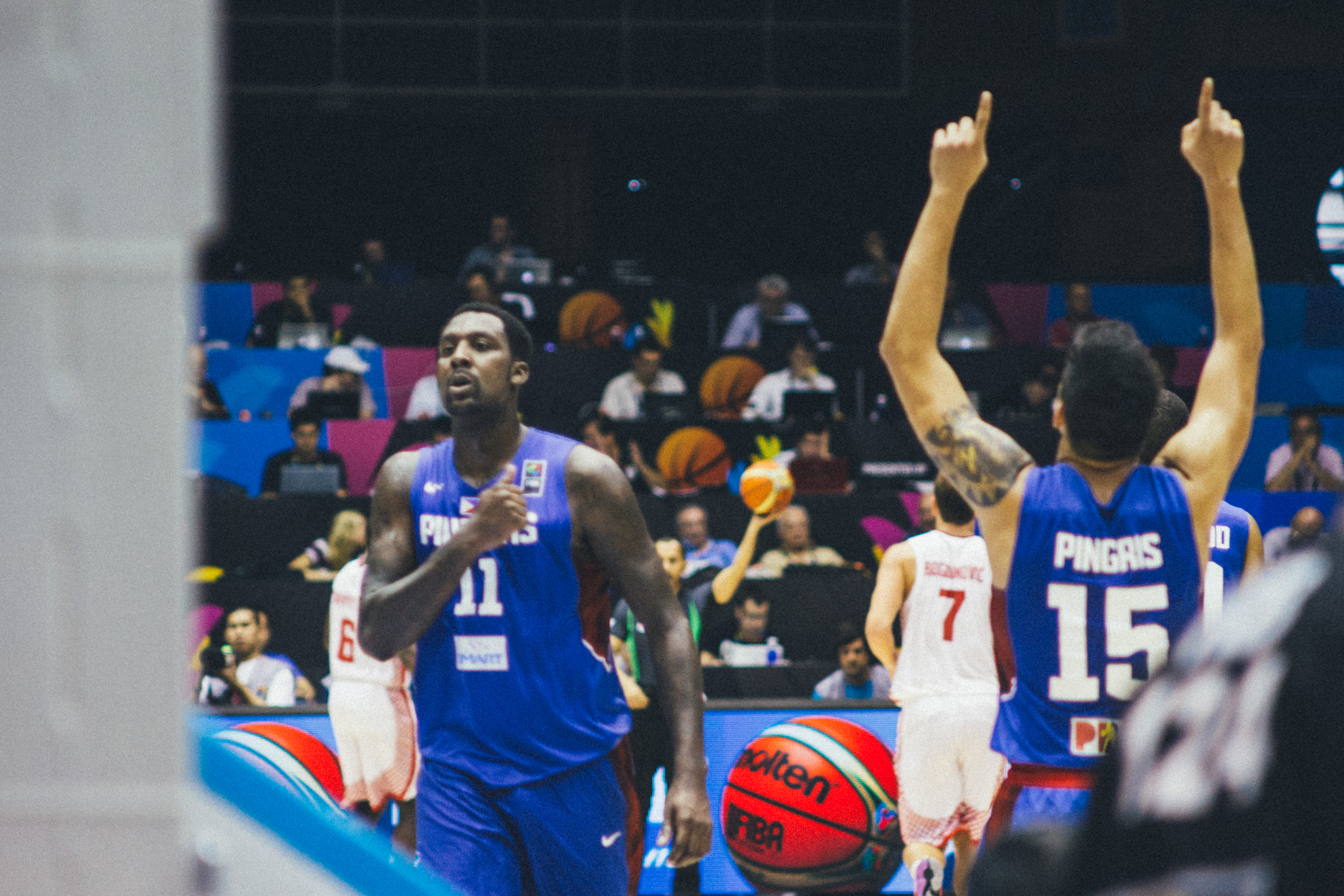
Blatche with the Philippine national team at the 2014 FIBA World Cup.

In January 2014, Blatche was asked by the Gilas Pilipinas to take part as a naturalized player for the 2014 FIBA Basketball World Cup in Spain and the 2014 Asian Games in Incheon, South Korea. On May 26, 2014, a bill granting Blatche's Filipino citizenship was approved by the Philippine Senate. On June 11, 2014, Blatche officially became a Filipino citizen upon the signing of Republic Act 10636 by Philippine President Benigno Aquino III.

In August 2014, Blatche was named in the 2014 Philippine FIBA Basketball World Cup and Asian Games squad. He was later disqualified to play in the 2014 Asian Games due to eligibility issues cited by the Olympic Council of Asia (OCA), as he lacked the required three-year residency in the Philippines. In five games at the World Cup, he averaged 21.2 points, 13.8 rebounds and 1.6 steals per game. With an 18-point, 14-rebound performance, Blatche helped the Philippines to their first World Cup win in 40 years, defeating Senegal 81–79 in overtime.

In 2015, Blatche played for the Philippines at the 2015 FIBA Asia Championship under new head coach Tab Baldwin. In nine games, he averaged 17.8 points, 9.2 rebounds and 1.2 assists per game. The following year, the team competed in the FIBA Olympic Qualifying Tournament, where in two games, he scored a total of 51 points.

Blatche was expected to suit up for the 2017 FIBA Asia Cup but pulled out due to security concerns over the militant situation in the host country Lebanon. He was replaced by Christian Standhardinger as the Philippine team's naturalized citizen.

On July 2, 2018, Blatche was involved in a brawl during the Philippines' 2019 FIBA World Cup qualifier against Australia.

In January 2020, the Samahang Basketbol ng Pilipinas bared that they are "moving on" from Blatche, and are looking for another naturalized player for the national team.

== Personal life ==
On the Sunday morning of September 25, 2005, three months after the Wizards selected him with the 49th overall pick in the NBA draft, Blatche was shot in an attempted carjacking that took place near his home in Alexandria, Virginia. Police said Blatche was ordered out of the car by men who emerged from a van and was shot before he could fully exit. Blatche's mother, Angela Oliver, said he was shot once in the chest, but that the bullet did not hit any vital organs. He was released from hospital two days later. As a result of his injuries, he missed the Wizards' training camp, although he could walk on his own three days after the shooting and one day after being released from the hospital.

On August 2, 2007, Blatche was charged with sexual solicitation in the Logan Circle neighborhood of Washington, D.C. after allegedly soliciting sex from an undercover police officer. The solicitation charge was dropped after Blatche followed court orders and attended a day-long seminar for men who solicit prostitutes.

Blatche was arrested on June 4, 2008, in Virginia on charges of reckless driving and driving on a suspended license for the third time. Blatche was going 86 mph in a 70 mph zone in a Mercedes on Interstate 85. He was released on bond.

In June 2011, Blatche established the Andray Blatche Foundation and went on a charity mission to Jamaica where he donated sneakers, basketballs and gave a $50,000 check to Jamaican schools.
