= 2010–11 Iranian Basketball Super League =

Locations of the 2010–11 season teams

The following is the results of the Iran Super League 2010/11 basketball season, Persian Gulf Cup.

== Regular season ==
=== Standings ===
Rank	Team	Pld	W	L	PF	PA	PD	Pts
1	Mahram Tehran	22	20	2	2027	1518	+509	42
2	Zob Ahan Isfahan	22	19	3	1874	1492	+382	41
3	Petrochimi Bandar Imam	22	17	5	1792	1465	+327	39
4	Rah & Tarabari Qom	22	16	6	1736	1617	+119	38
5	Towzin Electric Kashan	22	15	7	1542	1406	+136	37
6	Azad University Tehran	22	10	12	1732	1723	+9	32
7	Shahrdari Gorgan	22	8	14	1445	1644	−199	30
8	Caspian Qazvin	22	7	15	1388	1571	−183	29
9	B.A Shiraz	22	7	15	1638	1844	−206	29
10	Melli Haffari Ahvaz	22	6	16	1582	1865	−283	28
11	Heyat Basketball Shahrekord	22	5	17	1449	1682	−233	27
12	Bank Saman Tehran	22	2	20	1490	1868	−378	24

=== Results ===
	AZD	SAM	BAS	CAS	HBS	MAH	HAF	PET	RAH	GOR	TEC	ZOB
Azad University		109–85	100–99	78–71	83–74	78–94	97–78	67–94	82–85	68–70	83–51	73–77
Bank Saman	72–85		76–78	73–84	53–68	51–120	101–89	69–97	77–95	61–69	65–85	78–84
B.A Shiraz	72–78	87–66		62–65	75–70	65–90	98–93	75–89	90–97	83–82	60–62	84–103
Caspian	63–81	51–74	69–50		65–57	60–89	85–77	50–67	81–84	61–63	46–65	49–75
HB Shahrekord	72–64	69–53	81–84	66–61		65–86	70–78	67–92	74–77	84–70	56–66	51–88
Mahram	98–96	106–70	91–59	90–56	86–45		117–48	92–79	91–81	100–60	89–63	74–78
Melli Haffari	86–76	78–66	81–89	57–69	80–69	71–95		67–93	64–62	102–109	50–78	74–72
Petrochimi	81–63	89–64	100–76	76–69	85–55	74–68	86–52		66–50	81–54	79–63	75–79
Rah & Tarabari	77–58	75–59	99–86	88–58	95–67	84–94	89–72	74–67		80–70	65–49	84–79
Shahrdari Gorgan	62–83	64–61	78–61	55–63	71–56	71–88	67–66	55–78	71–78		42–49	64–82
Towzin Electric	72–59	88–74	79–44	73–62	72–68	82–83	87–60	73–65	62–49	71–45		94–98
Zob Ahan	90–71	98–42	95–61	71–50	98–65	82–86	90–59	83–79	100–68	88–53	64–58	

== Relegation ==
Relegation
9	B.A Shiraz	84	91	71
12	Bank Saman	92	81	77
10	Melli Haffari	65	60	63
11	HB Shahrekord	68	40	52

== Playoffs ==
Fifth place
4	Rah & Tarabari	73	72	—
6	Azad University	80	80	—
Seventh place
8	Caspian	78
7	Shahrdari Gorgan	82

Consolation semifinals
8	Caspian	64	84	—
4	Rah & Tarabari	72	87	—
7	Shahrdari Gorgan	80	81	75
6	Azad University	69	92	81

Quarterfinals
1	Mahram	95	102	—
8	Caspian	60	61	—
4	Rah & Tarabari	51	71	—
5	Towzin Electric	82	76	—
2	Zob Ahan	76	91	—
7	Shahrdari Gorgan	61	67	—
3	Petrochimi	94	73	82
6	Azad University	95	64	81

Semifinals
1	Mahram	96	77	83	—	—
5	Towzin Electric	79	74	82	—	—
2	Zob Ahan	79	77	82	—	—
3	Petrochimi	72	66	77	—	—

Final
1	Mahram	101	95	76	71	105
2	Zob Ahan	76	92	89	73	96
3rd place
5	Towzin Electric	73	83	71	68	0
3	Petrochimi	92	81	68	75	20

=== Semifinals ===
Mahram vs. Towzin Electric

May 5
15:30

Report

Mahram	96–79	Towzin Electric
Scoring by quarter: 26–17, 29–24, 24–17, 17–21
Pts: Kambala 21; Rebs: Kambala 10; Asts: Williams 5		Pts: Jovanović 27; Rebs: Doraghi 8 Asts: Davarpanah 3

Azadi Basketball Hall, Tehran
Referees: Verej Abkarian, Jafar Mohammadpour, Sadegh Ghanbari

May 6
17:00

Report

Mahram	77–74	Towzin Electric
Scoring by quarter: 19–20, 24–20, 17–18, 17–16
Pts: Kambala 17; Rebs: Kambala 10; Asts: four players 2		Pts: Jovanović 32; Rebs: Doraghi 13; Asts: Jovanović 3

Azadi Basketball Hall, Tehran
Referees: Reza Javadi, Reza Azarafza, Nasr Saeidinia

May 9
17:00

Report

Towzin Electric	82–83	Mahram
Scoring by quarter: 17–18, 20–24, 22–30, 23–11
Pts: Jovanović 29; Rebs: Hassanzadeh 12; Asts: Mohammed 2		Pts: Kambala 24; Rebs: Kamrani 7 Asts: Williams 3

Ketabchi Arena, Kashan
Referees: Reza Javadi, Reza Azarafza, Nasr Saeidinia

Zob Ahan vs. Petrochimi

May 5
17:00

Report

Zob Ahan	79–72	Petrochimi
Scoring by quarter: 20–31, 19–10, 20–21, 20–10
Pts: Powell, Monroe 21; Rebs: Sahakian 8 Asts: Monroe 4		Pts: Baxter 23; Rebs: Sohrabnejad 17; Asts: Veisi, Kabir 2

Mellat Arena, Isfahan
Referees: Heros Avanesian, Amir Hossein Safarzadeh, Javad Zare

May 6
17:00

Report

Zob Ahan	77–66	Petrochimi
Scoring by quarter: 18–13, 15–11, 25–17, 19–25
Pts: Afagh 22; Rebs: Sahakian 11; Asts: Sahakian 2		Pts: Giles 25; Rebs: Sohrabnejad, Giles 7 Asts: Baxter, Kabir 1

Mellat Arena, Isfahan
Referees: Heros Avanesian, Amir Hossein Safarzadeh, Sadegh Ghanbari

May 9
17:00

Report

Petrochimi	77–82	Zob Ahan
Scoring by quarter: 15–23, 22–28, 20–12, 20–19
Pts: Baxter, Giles 14; Rebs: Sohrabnejad 10; Asts: Veisi, Nasajpour 3		Pts: Barro, Monroe 18; Rebs: Barro 14; Asts: Powell 5

Besat Andisheh Arena, Mahshahr
Referees: Heros Avanesian, Amir Hossein Safarzadeh, Sadegh Ghanbari

=== Final ===
Mahram vs. Zob Ahan

May 16
15:45

Report

Mahram	101–76	Zob Ahan
Scoring by quarter: 13–18, 36–11, 26–23, 26–24
Pts: Nikkhah 28; Rebs: Samb 14; Asts: four players 3		Pts: Powell 25; Rebs: Sahakian, Barro 10; Asts: Monroe 3

Azadi Basketball Hall, Tehran
Referees: Heros Avanesian, Ramin Hosseinzadeh, Hassan Nikkhah

May 17
15:45

Report

Mahram	95–92	Zob Ahan
Scoring by quarter: 20–19, 23–23, 22–21, 30–29
Pts: Kamrani 20; Rebs: Samb 9 Asts: Williams 3		Pts: Monroe 31; Rebs: Sahakian 11; Asts: Powell, Afagh, Monroe 1

Azadi Basketball Hall, Tehran
Referees: Heros Avanesian, Ramin Hosseinzadeh, Hassan Nikkhah

May 20
17:00

Report

Zob Ahan	89–76	Mahram
Scoring by quarter: 19–12, 30–10, 12–21, 28–33
Pts: Powell 19; Rebs: Sahakian 7 Asts: Davoudi, Powell 3		Pts: Nikkhah 28; Rebs: Samb 11; Asts: Kamrani 4

Mellat Arena, Isfahan
Referees: Amir Hossein Safarzadeh, Hassan Nikkhah, Mohammad Shahmirzadi

May 21
17:00

Report

Zob Ahan	73–71	Mahram
Scoring by quarter: 18–21, 19–21, 21–15, 15–14
Pts: Powell 28; Rebs: Sahakian 13; Asts: four players 1		Pts: Samb 26; Rebs: Samb 10; Asts: Atashi, Kamrani, Williams 2

Mellat Arena, Isfahan
Referees: Amir Hossein Safarzadeh, Hassan Nikkhah, Mohammad Shahmirzadi

May 23
15:45

Report

Mahram	105–96 (OT)	Zob Ahan
Scoring by quarter: 19–23, 18–13, 23–31, 29–22, Overtime: 16–7
Pts: Samb 35; Rebs: Samb 23; Asts: Kamrani 3		Pts: Powell 26; Rebs: Sahakian 19; Asts: Powell 4

Azadi Basketball Hall, Tehran
Referees: Heros Avanesian, Amir Hossein Safarzadeh, Mahmoud Oliazadeh

== Final standings ==
Rank	Team	Qualification or relegation
1	Mahram Tehran	2012 West Asian Basketball League
2	Zob Ahan Isfahan	2012 West Asian Basketball League
3	Petrochimi Bandar Imam	2012 West Asian Basketball League
4	Towzin Electric Kashan	
5	Azad University Tehran	
6	Rah & Tarabari Qom	
7	Shahrdari Gorgan	
8	Caspian Qazvin	
9	Melli Haffari Ahvaz	
10	Bank Saman Tehran	
11	B.A Shiraz	Relegation to the first division
12	Heyat Basketball Shahrekord	Relegation to the first division
