= 2011–12 Iranian Basketball Super League =

Locations of the 2011–12 season teams

The following is the results of the Iran Super League 2011/12 basketball season, named as the Persian Gulf Cup.

== Regular season ==
=== Standings ===
Rank	Team	Pld	W	L	PF	PA	PD	Pts
1	Mahram Tehran	22	22	0	1978	1508	+470	44
2	Foolad Mahan Isfahan	22	18	4	1756	1522	+234	40
3	Petrochimi Bandar Imam	22	15	7	1659	1469	+190	37
4	Azad University Tehran	22	15	7	1658	1540	+118	37
5	Zob Ahan Isfahan	22	14	8	1627	1482	+145	36
6	Sanaye Petrochimi Mahshahr	22	11	11	1479	1468	+11	33
7	Melli Haffari Ahvaz	22	8	14	1475	1562	−87	30
8	Shahrdari Gorgan	22	7	15	1453	1569	−116	29
9	Hamyari Shahrdari Zanjan	22	7	15	1477	1715	−238	29
10	Pouya Tehran	22	6	16	1477	1786	−309	28
11	Louleh a.s Shiraz	22	6	16	1427	1549	−122	28
12	Jahesh Tarabar Qom	22	3	19	1464	1760	−296	25

=== Results ===
	AZD	FLD	JAH	LAS	MAH	HAF	PET	PUY	SPM	GOR	ZAN	ZOB
Azad University		76–80	71–64	75–46	77–100	72–61	79–72	105–58	87–64	92–57	81–59	82–79
Foolad Mahan	92–57		77–65	79–73	70–81	73–53	95–84	83–56	80–73	91–75	89–66	76–82
Jahesh Tarabar	72–73	79–105		68–77	64–100	58–75	83–81	57–64	82–70	73–77	66–68	45–75
Louleh a.s	69–81	61–64	83–82		71–85	58–57	65–72	75–69	61–65	72–44	74–64	59–79
Mahram	89–77	82–70	94–45	101–74		80–67	92–83	121–59	94–74	97–71	86–51	92–74
Melli Haffari	54–66	70–81	102–99	63–60	77–94		59–71	72–62	70–64	80–58	75–71	61–68
Petrochimi	80–59	70–71	88–52	72–60	70–92	77–64		72–39	62–55	78–56	95–58	76–70
Pouya	78–72	69–81	78–83	76–69	74–93	67–56	68–87		84–94	72–65	88–94	68–114
Sanaye Petrochimi	75–73	47–64	76–49	49–45	61–70	71–60	55–71	76–63		67–47	85–71	71–56
Shahrdari Gorgan	57–60	72–74	66–57	70–46	71–79	75–62	55–58	55–56	67–47		90–71	70–66
Shahrdari Zanjan	69–73	50–86	84–63	67–66	60–83	60–76	73–74	77–70	34–70	103–95		54–70
Zob Ahan	65–70	81–75	76–58	67–63	68–73	77–61	69–66	85–59	78–70	68–60	60–73	

== Relegation ==
Relegation
9	Shahrdari Zanjan	67	83	—
12	Jahesh Tarabar	60	78	—
10	Pouya	47	77	60
11	Louleh a.s	76	69	65

== Playoffs ==
Fifth place
5	Zob Ahan	73	65	—
6	Sanaye Petrochimi	90	79	—
Seventh place
8	Shahrdari Gorgan	76	69	X
7	Melli Haffari	70	75	X

Consolation semifinals
8	Shahrdari Gorgan	52	63	—
5	Zob Ahan	62	74	—
7	Melli Haffari	89	64	61
6	Sanaye Petrochimi	80	80	72

Quarterfinals
1	Mahram	94	109	—
8	Shahrdari Gorgan	73	53	—
4	Azad University	73	81	—
5	Zob Ahan	49	76	—
2	Foolad Mahan	92	95	—
7	Melli Haffari	83	65	—
3	Petrochimi	62	70	74
6	Sanaye Petrochimi	58	71	59

Semifinals
1	Mahram	113	97	92	—	—
4	Azad University	95	81	78	—	—
2	Foolad Mahan	82	73	84	75	73
3	Petrochimi	75	64	105	80	75

Final
1	Mahram	81	95	111	—	—
3	Petrochimi	73	82	93	—	—
Third place
4	Azad University	49	67	69	—	—
2	Foolad Mahan	74	88	80	—	—

=== Quarterfinals ===
Mahram vs. Shahrdari Gorgan

April 14
16:00

Report

Mahram	94–73	Shahrdari Gorgan
Scoring by quarter: 20–24, 36–7, 21–21, 17–21
Pts: Sedighi 21; Rebs: Mashayekhi 9 Asts: Aslani, Sedighi 2		Pts: Askarnejad 32; Rebs: Askarnejad 12; Asts: Allahverdi 4

Azadi Basketball Hall, Tehran
Referees: Verej Abkarian, Amir Vahedpour, Asghar Ghasemian

April 19
16:00

Report

Shahrdari Gorgan	53–109	Mahram
Scoring by quarter: 7–31, 13–25, 16–25, 17–28
Pts: Abramian 15; Rebs: Bakhshi 12; Asts: Safaei 3		Pts: Aslani 24; Rebs: Rahmati, Mashayekhi 10; Asts: Mashayekhi 5

Azadi Basketball Hall, Tehran
Referees: Mahmoud Oliazadeh, Amir Hossein Safarzadeh, Mohammad Shahmirzadi

Azad University vs. Zob Ahan

April 14
16:00

Report

Zob Ahan	49–73	Azad University
Scoring by quarter: 14–10, 14–28, 7–21, 14–14
Pts: Akbari 14; Rebs: Sahakian 7 Asts: Salmani 4		Pts: Vučićević 18; Rebs: Nabipour 9 Asts: Smith 4

Mellat Arena, Isfahan
Referees: Amir Hossein Safarzadeh, Mohsen Roshanzamir, Alireza Nasser-Afshar

April 17
16:00

Report

Azad University	81–76	Zob Ahan
Scoring by quarter: 20–21, 21–19, 17–23, 23–13
Pts: Vučićević 23; Rebs: Arghavan 8 Asts: Vučićević 4		Pts: Ahmadian 17; Rebs: Salmani, Ahmadian 5 Asts: Sahakian, Ahmadian 2

Azadi Basketball Hall, Tehran
Referees: Heros Avanesian, Hassan Nikkhah, Mohammad Shahmirzadi

Foolad Mahan vs. Melli Haffari

April 14
16:00

Report

Melli Haffari	83–92	Foolad Mahan
Scoring by quarter: 23–21, 20–26, 17–29, 23–16
Pts: Wright 37; Rebs: Boroun 9 Asts: Wright, Ad. Doraghi 4		Pts: Davari 24; Rebs: Kardoust 10; Asts: Davari, Anderson 3

22 Bahman Arena, Ahvaz
Referees: Hassan Nikkhah, Jafar Mohammadpour, Mohammad Shahmirzadi

April 17
16:00

Report

Foolad Mahan	95–65	Melli Haffari
Scoring by quarter: 19–14, 18–20, 27–13, 31–18
Pts: Anderson 31; Rebs: Hassanzadeh 14; Asts: Davari 8		Pts: Ad. Doraghi 26; Rebs: Ghasemi, Karimi 7 Asts: four players 1

Mokhaberat Arena, Isfahan
Referees: Verej Abkarian, Behrouz Ebrahimi, Javad Zare

Petrochimi vs. Sanaye Petrochimi

April 14
16:00

Report

Sanaye Petrochimi	58–62	Petrochimi
Scoring by quarter: 14–19, 14–8, 10–14, 20–21
Pts: Lett 20; Rebs: Vraneš 16; Asts: Amini 3		Pts: Forte 19; Rebs: Sohrabnejad, Akindele, Forte 8 Asts: Forte 4

Besat Andisheh Arena, Mahshahr
Referees: Reza Javadi, Reza Azarafza, Nasr Saeidinia

April 17
16:00

Report

Petrochimi	70–71	Sanaye Petrochimi
Scoring by quarter: 16–23, 15–16, 13–8, 26–24
Pts: Akindele 23; Rebs: Akindele 22; Asts: Forte 4		Pts: Zandi 24; Rebs: Vraneš, Lett 11; Asts: Lett 6

Besat Andisheh Arena, Mahshahr
Referees: Amir Hossein Safarzadeh, Jafar Mohammadpour, Sadegh Ghanbari

April 20
16:00

Report

Petrochimi	74–59	Sanaye Petrochimi
Scoring by quarter: 15–18, 21–17, 20–10, 18–14
Pts: Akindele 16; Rebs: Forte 12; Asts: Forte 5		Pts: Zandi 18; Rebs: Vraneš, Lett 10; Asts: Amini 3

Besat Andisheh Arena, Mahshahr
Referees: Heros Avanesian, Verej Abkarian, Reza Javadi

=== Semifinals ===
Mahram vs. Azad University

April 23
15:45

Report

Azad University	95–113	Mahram
Scoring by quarter: 15–25, 19–30, 30–26, 31–32
Pts: Khabbazan 18; Rebs: Nabipour 9 Asts: Khabbazan 3		Pts: Nikkhah 26; Rebs: Sow 14; Asts: Nikkhah 4

Azadi Basketball Hall, Tehran
Referees: Verej Abkarian, Reza Javadi, Reza Azarafza

April 24
17:00

Report

Mahram	97–81	Azad University
Scoring by quarter: 28–21, 23–24, 26–21, 20–15
Pts: Afagh, Nikkhah 26; Rebs: Afagh, Sow 6 Asts: Kamrani, Nikkhah 5		Pts: Nabipour 27; Rebs: Nabipour 7 Asts: Vučićević 2

Azadi Basketball Hall, Tehran
Referees: Amir Hossein Safarzadeh, Ramin Hosseinzadeh, Mohammad Shahmirzadi

May 2
17:00

Report

Mahram	92–78	Azad University
Scoring by quarter: 17–24, 28–7, 24–24, 23–23
Pts: Nikkhah 32; Rebs: Sow 10; Asts: Nikkhah 4		Pts: Nabipour 21; Rebs: Arghavan 7 Asts: Smith 4

Azadi Basketball Hall, Tehran
Referees: Verej Abkarian, Reza Javadi, Rasoul Davari

Foolad Mahan vs. Petrochimi

April 23
17:00

Report

Foolad Mahan	82–75	Petrochimi
Scoring by quarter: 26–18, 12–20, 26–20, 18–17
Pts: Davari 23; Rebs: Leather 9 Asts: Nezafat 7		Pts: Lalehzadeh 14; Rebs: Sohrabnejad 8 Asts: Forte 4

Mokhaberat Arena, Isfahan
Referees: Amir Hossein Safarzadeh, Ramin Hosseinzadeh, Behrouz Ebrahimi

April 24
17:00

Report

Foolad Mahan	73–64	Petrochimi
Scoring by quarter: 17–23, 19–8, 12–19, 25–14
Pts: Kardoust 26; Rebs: Kardoust 12; Asts: Davari 3		Pts: Forte 20; Rebs: Akindele 9 Asts: Atashi 3

Mokhaberat Arena, Isfahan
Referees: Heros Avanesian, Verej Abkarian, Sadegh Ghanbari

May 2
17:00

Report

Petrochimi	105–84	Foolad Mahan
Scoring by quarter: 17–26, 24–20, 23–22, 41–16
Pts: Davarpanah, Akindele 20; Rebs: Akindele 14; Asts: Forte 7		Pts: Anderson 25; Rebs: Leather 12; Asts: Nezafat, Ghasemzadeh 3

Besat Andisheh Arena, Mahshahr
Referees: Amir Hossein Safarzadeh, Jafar Mohammadpour, Mohammad Shahmirzadi

May 3
17:00

Report

Petrochimi	80–75	Foolad Mahan
Scoring by quarter: 12–24, 24–19, 24–14, 20–18
Pts: Akindele 26; Rebs: Akindele 14; Asts: Forte 5		Pts: Davari 21; Rebs: Leather 9 Asts: Kardoust, Anderson 2

Besat Andisheh Arena, Mahshahr
Referees: Amir Hossein Safarzadeh, Mahmoud Oliazadeh, Alireza Nasser-Afshar

May 9
17:00

Report

Petrochimi	75–73	Foolad Mahan
Scoring by quarter: 22–20, 12–18, 22–17, 19–18
Pts: Akindele 29; Rebs: Akindele 6 Asts: Forte 3		Pts: Leather 15; Rebs: Leather 17; Asts: Nezafat, Davari, Anderson 2

Besat Andisheh Arena, Mahshahr
Referees: Heros Avanesian, Amir Hossein Safarzadeh, Ramin Hosseinzadeh

=== 3rd place ===
Azad University vs. Foolad Mahan

May 14
16:00

Report

Foolad Mahan	74–49	Azad University
Scoring by quarter: 17–10, 20–14, 21–6, 16–19
Pts: Leather 19; Rebs: Leather 11; Asts: Davari 4		Pts: Vučićević 13; Rebs: Vučićević 8 Asts: Mohseni 2

Mokhaberat Arena, Isfahan
Referees: Shahram Parniak, Amir Vahedpour, Mohsen Roshanzamir

May 15
16:00

Report

Foolad Mahan	88–67	Azad University
Scoring by quarter: 19–18, 26–20, 23–18, 20–11

Mokhaberat Arena, Isfahan
Referees: Shahram Parniak, Amir Vahedpour, Mohsen Roshanzamir

May 21
14:30

Report

Azad University	69–80	Foolad Mahan
Scoring by quarter: 19–11, 18–27, 15–25, 17–17
Pts: Khabbazan 22; Rebs: Khabbazan, Arghavan, Reihani 7 Asts: Khabbazan 2		Pts: Leather 20; Rebs: Leather 9 Asts: Davari, Tavakkoli 2

Azadi Basketball Hall, Tehran
Referees: Hassan Nikkhah, Shahram Parniak, Mahmoud Oliazadeh

=== Final ===
Mahram vs. Petrochimi

May 14
17:00

Report

Petrochimi	73–81	Mahram
Scoring by quarter: 17–28, 18–17, 15–18, 23–18
Pts: Jamshidi 14; Rebs: Akindele 8 Asts: Forte 3		Pts: Tskitishvili 22; Rebs: Sow 10; Asts: Nikkhah 4

Besat Andisheh Arena, Mahshahr
Referees: Ramin Hosseinzadeh, Reza Javadi, Reza Azarafza

May 15
17:00

Report

Petrochimi	82–95	Mahram
Scoring by quarter: 24–25, 19–25, 25–22, 14–23
Pts: Davarpanah 27; Rebs: Akindele 8 Asts: Davarpanah 5		Pts: Tskitishvili 29; Rebs: Sow 14; Asts: Kamrani 4

Besat Andisheh Arena, Mahshahr
Referees: Ramin Hosseinzadeh, Reza Javadi, Reza Azarafza

May 21
16:45

Report

Mahram	111–93	Petrochimi
Scoring by quarter: 22–23, 32–19, 28–19, 29–32
Pts: Nikkhah 25; Rebs: Sow 14; Asts: Kamrani 8		Pts: Atashi 21; Rebs: Akindele 11; Asts: Forte 8

Azadi Basketball Hall, Tehran
Referees: Amir Hossein Safarzadeh, Ramin Hosseinzadeh, Mohammad Shahmirzadi

== Final standings ==
Rank	Team	Qualification or relegation
1	Mahram Tehran	2013 West Asian Basketball League
2	Petrochimi Bandar Imam	2013 West Asian Basketball League
3	Foolad Mahan Isfahan	2013 West Asian Basketball League
4	Azad University Tehran	
5	Sanaye Petrochimi Mahshahr	
6	Zob Ahan Isfahan	
7	Melli Haffari Ahvaz	
8	Shahrdari Gorgan	
9	Louleh a.s Shiraz	
10	Hamyari Shahrdari Zanjan	
11	Pouya Tehran	Relegation to the first division
12	Jahesh Tarabar Qom	Relegation to the first division
