= Hamed Afagh =

Iranian basketball player (born 1983)

No. 10 – Shahrdari Arak
- Position: Shooting guard
- League: Iranian League

Personal information
- Born: February 1, 1983 (age 43) Mashhad, Iran
- Listed height: 6 ft 2 in (1.88 m)
- Listed weight: 181 lb (82 kg)

Career information
- Playing career: 2001–present

Career history
- 2001–2003: Farsh Mashhad
- 2003–2009: Saba Battery
- 2009–2010: Mahram
- 2010–2011: Zob Ahan
- 2011–2012: Mahram
- 2012–2015: Petrochimi
- 2015–2017: Shahrdari Arak
Medals
Asian Championship
Gold medal – first place	2007 Tokushima	Team
Gold medal – first place	2009 Tianjin	Team
Gold medal – first place	2013 Manila	Team
Bronze medal – third place	2015 Changsha	Team
Asian Games
Silver medal – second place	2014 Incheon	Team
Bronze medal – third place	2006 Doha	Team
Bronze medal – third place	2010 Guangzhou	Team
Asian Cup
Gold medal – first place	2012 Tokyo	Team

Hamed Afagh Eslamieh (Persian: حامد آفاق اسلامیه; born February 1, 1983) is a professional Iranian basketball player who plays for Shahrdari Arak of the Iranian Super League and also for the Iranian national basketball team. He is 6 feet 2 inches (1.88 m) in height.

== Honours ==
=== National team ===
- Asian Championship
  - Gold medal: 2007, 2009, 2013
- Asian Games
  - Bronze medal: 2006, 2010
- Islamic Solidarity Games
  - Bronze medal: 2005
- Asian Indoor Games
  - Gold medal: 2009

=== Club ===
- Asian Championship
  - Gold medal: 2007, 2008 (Saba Battery), 2009, 2010 (Mahram)
- West Asian Championship
  - Gold medal: 2007 (Saba Battery), 2010, 2012 (Mahram)
- Iranian Super League
  - Champions: 2004, 2006, 2007 (Saba Battery), 2010, 2012 (Mahram), 2013 (Petrochimi)
