= Jackson Vroman =

American basketball player (1981–2015)

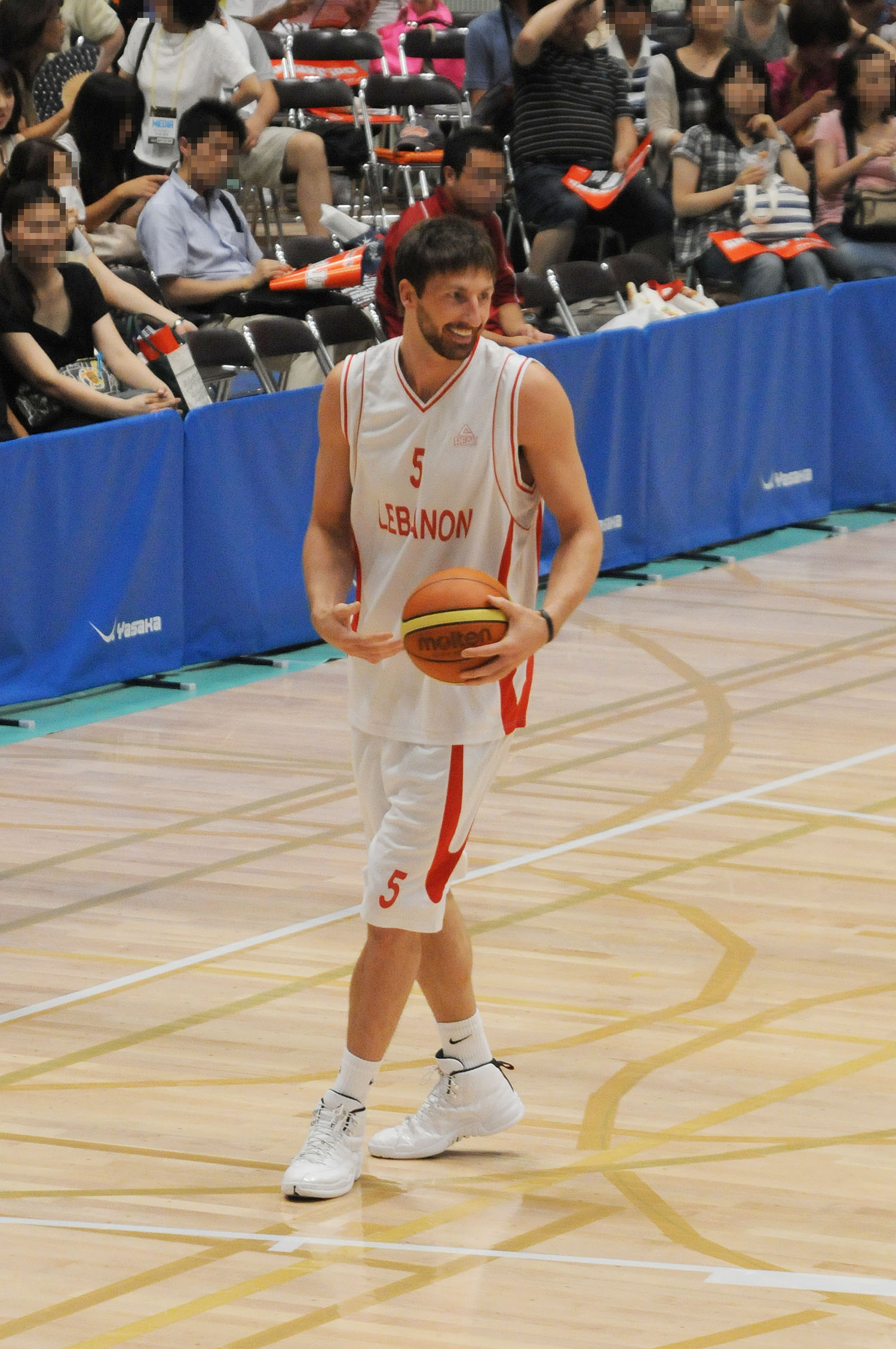
- Vroman with Lebanon against Japan

Personal information
- Born: June 6, 1981 Laguna, California, U.S.
- Died: June 29, 2015 (aged 34) Los Angeles County, California, U.S.
- Listed height: 6 ft 10 in (2.08 m)
- Listed weight: 220 lb (100 kg)

Career information
- High school: Viewmont (Bountiful, Utah)
- College: Snow College (2000–2002); Iowa State (2002–2004)
- NBA draft: 2004: 2nd round, 31st overall pick
- Drafted by: Chicago Bulls
- Playing career: 2004–2015
- Position: Power forward / center
- Number: 4

Career history
- 2004–2005: Phoenix Suns
- 2005–2006: New Orleans Hornets (Note: During the 2005–06 and 2006–07 seasons, the team was known as the New Orleans/Oklahoma City Hornets during their temporary relocation to Oklahoma City due to Hurricane Katrina.)
- 2006–2007: CB Gran Canaria
- 2007–2008: CB Girona
- 2008: BC Lietuvos Rytas
- 2009: Saba Mehr
- 2009–2010: Mahram
- 2010–2011: Dongguan Leopards
- 2011: Incheon ET Land Elephants
- 2011–2012: Jiangsu Dragons
- 2012: Barangay Ginebra Kings
- 2012–2013: Shandong Lions
- 2013–2014: Jiangsu Dragons
- 2014: Capitanes de Arecibo

Career highlights
- FIBA Asia Champions Cup MVP (2009)
- Stats at NBA.com
- Stats at Basketball Reference

Jackson Brett Vroman (June 6, 1981 – June 29, 2015) was an American-born Lebanese professional basketball player who starred at Iowa State University. Mr. Vroman was naturalized as a Lebanese citizen to play for the Lebanon national basketball team, replacing the other naturalized American Lebanese player, Joe Vogel. He is the son of former NBA player Brett Vroman, who played briefly for the Utah Jazz in the 1980–81 NBA season.

== Early life and education ==
His senior year in high school, he played at Viewmont High School in Bountiful, Utah for coach Emery. He later attended and played basketball at Snow College in Ephraim, Utah and Iowa State University.

During his time at Iowa State, Vroman was a subject of an NCAA rule violation when it was revealed that his former head coach Larry Eustachy paid players, including Vroman, for making free throws during practice and games during the 2002–03 season.

== Professional career ==
Vroman was a second-round draft pick of the Chicago Bulls in the 2004 NBA draft. He played for the Phoenix Suns and the New Orleans Hornets/New Orleans/Oklahoma City Hornets, averaging 4.6 points and 3.8 rebounds per game.

During the 2004–05 NBA season he was part of a trade that saw him and teammates Casey Jacobsen and Maciej Lampe being sent to the Hornets for guard Jim Jackson.

In the 2006–07 season, he played for CB Gran Canaria in the Spanish ACB. He began the 2007/08 season with CB Girona before being signed by BC Lietuvos Rytas in February 2008. In October 2010 he signed with the Dongguan Leopards in China. For the 2011–12 season, he signed with the Incheon ET Land Elephants in South Korea, but in December 2011, he signed a contract with the Jiangsu Dragons.

He then signed for the Barangay Ginebra Kings in the Philippines and played his first game for them on March 4, 2012. Later that year, he joined the Shandong Lions of China.

== Personal life ==
His father, Brett, had a 12-year basketball career and played for the Utah Jazz during the 1980–81 NBA season.

=== Death ===
Vroman was found dead in a swimming pool at his friend's home in Hollywood, California on June 29, 2015. The death was ruled accidental; security camera footage showed him falling into his pool.

Autopsy showed an enlarged heart, with toxicology reports showing ketamine, cocaine, and GHB in his system.

== Honours ==
=== Club ===
- Asian Championship
  - Champions: 2009, 2010 (Mahram)
- West Asian Championship
  - Champions: 2010 (Mahram)
  - 3rd: 2009 (Saba Mehr)
- Iranian Basketball Super League
  - Champions: 2009–10 (Mahram)
  - 3rd: 2008–09 (Saba Mehr)

=== Individual ===
- Asian Championship
  - Most Valuable Player: 2009 (Mahram)
- FIBA Asia Championship 2009 6th-top scorer averaging 17.3 ppg
- FIBA Asia Championship 2009 5th-top rebounder averaging 8.1 rpg
