= Mehdi Kamrani =

Iranian basketball player (born 1982)

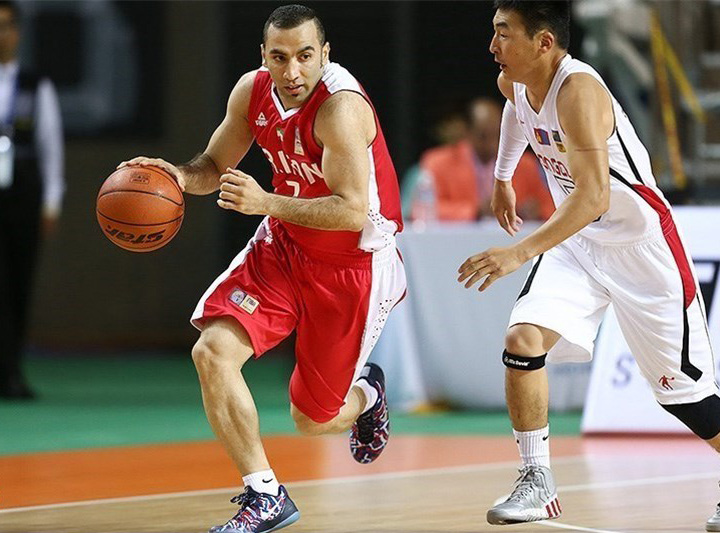

Personal information
- Born: June 1, 1982 (age 44) Ray, Iran
- Listed height: 6 ft 2 in (1.88 m)
- Listed weight: 165 lb (75 kg)

Career information
- Playing career: 2000–2022
- Position: Point guard

Career history
- 2000–2003: Paykan
- 2003–2005: Saba Battery
- 2005–2006: Paykan
- 2006–2013: Mahram Tehran
- 2008: →Saba Battery
- 2013–2014: Petrochimi
- 2014–2015: Jiangsu Tongxi
- 2015–2016: Beijing Beikong
- 2016–2017: Jilin Jiutai Countryside Commercial Bank
- 2018–2020: Chemidor Qom
- 2020–2022: Mahram Tehran
Medals
Men's basketball
Representing Iran
Asian Championship
| Gold medal – first place | 2007 Japan | Team |
| Gold medal – first place | 2009 China | Team |
| Gold medal – first place | 2013 Philippines | Team |
| Bronze medal – third place | 2015 Changsha | Team |
Asian Games
| Silver medal – second place | 2014 Incheon | Team |
| Bronze medal – third place | 2006 Doha | Team |
| Bronze medal – third place | 2010 Guangzhou | Team |

Mehdi Kamrani (Persian: مهدی کامرانی, born June 1, 1982, in Ray, Iran) is an Iranian professional basketball player.

== Career statistics ==
| Year | Team | GP | GS | MPG | FG% | 3P% | FT% | RPG | APG | SPG | BPG | PPG |
|---|---|---|---|---|---|---|---|---|---|---|---|---|
| 2014–15 | Jiangsu Monkey King | 35 | 34 | 37.1 | .463 | .339 | .745 | 3.5 | 5.2 | 2.8 | 0.1 | 16.4 |
| 2015–16 | Beikong Fly Dragons | 34 | 34 | 39.4 | .447 | .380 | .675 | 4.6 | 6.5 | 2.8 | 0.1 | 19.3 |

== Honours ==
=== National team ===
- Asian Championship
  - Gold medal: 2007, 2009, 2013
- Asian Games
  - Bronze medal: 2006, 2010
- Islamic Solidarity Games
  - Bronze medal: 2005
- Asian Indoor Games
  - Gold medal: 2009

=== Club ===
- Asian Championship
  - Gold medal: 2008 (Saba Battery), 2009, 2010 (Mahram)
- West Asian Championship
  - Gold medal: 2009, 2010, 2012 (Mahram)
- Iranian Basketball Super League
  - Champions: 2004 (Saba Battery), 2008, 2009, 2010, 2011, 2012 (Mahram)

== Personal life ==
On 8 February 2026, Kamrani responded to the high casualty rate of the 2025–2026 Iranian protests on his Instagram, saying: "No matter who you negotiate with, you cannot negotiate with the Iranian people for this crime you committed."
