= Samad Nikkhah Bahrami =

Iranian basketball player

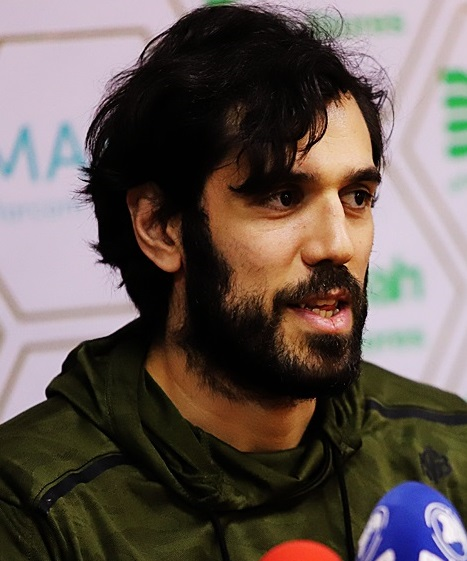
- Nikkhah in 2020

Personal information
- Born: 11 May 1983 (age 43) Tehran, Iran
- Listed height: 6 ft 6 in (1.98 m)
- Listed weight: 212 lb (96 kg)

Career information
- Playing career: 2001–2021
- Position: Small forward

Career history
- 2001–2002: Iran Nara
- 2002–2005: Sanam
- 2005: → Saba Battery
- 2005–2006: Petrochimi
- 2006–2008: Mahram
- 2007–2008: → Saba Battery
- 2008: Cholet
- 2008–2009: Pau-Orthez
- 2009–2013: Mahram
- 2013: → Foolad Mahan
- 2013–2014: Fujian SBS Sturgeons
- 2014–2015: Petrochimi
- 2015–2016: Zhejiang Golden Bulls
- 2016–2017: Guangzhou Long-Lions
- 2017–2018: Nanjing Monkey King
- 2019–2021: Mahram

Career highlights
- 3x FIBA Asia Championship All-Star Selection (2009, 2011, 2015); FIBA Asia Challenge MVP (2012); 4× FIBA Asian Club champion (2007, 2008, 2009, 2010); FIBA Asian Club MVP (2007); 2× Olympic Stints (2008, 2020)
Medals
Men's basketball
Representing Iran
FIBA Asia Championship
Gold medal – first place	2007 Tokushima	Team
Gold medal – first place	2009 Tianjin	Team
Gold medal – first place	2013 Manila	Team
Bronze medal – third place	2015 Changsha	Team
Asian Games
Silver medal – second place	2014 Incheon	Team
Silver medal – second place	2018 Jakarta-Palembang	Team
Bronze medal – third place	2006 Doha	Team
Bronze medal – third place	2010 Guangzhou	Team
Asian Cup
Gold medal – first place	2012 Tokyo	Team
William Jones Cup
Gold medal – first place	2009 Taipei	Team
Gold medal – first place	2011 Taipei	Team
Silver medal – second place	2012 Taipei	Team
Gold medal – first place	2013 Taipei	Team

Mohammad Samad Nikkhah Bahrami (Persian: محمدصمد نیکخواه بهرامی, born 11 May 1983) is an Iranian former professional basketball player.

== Pro career ==
He previously played for Saba Battery as a subsidiary player, teaming with his since-deceased brother Aidin Nikkhah Bahrami to help the team win the Asian Championship.

=== Cholet ===
On 22 August 2008, Nikkhah signed a one-year deal with French LNB side Cholet Basket for an undisclosed fee. By doing so he became the first Iranian to ever play professional basketball in France. He left Cholet on 30 September by mutual consent due to administrative problems.

=== ÉB Pau-Orthez ===
On 21 October 2008, Nikkhah Bahrami signed a one-year contract with another French side Élan Béarnais Pau-Orthez.

== Career statistics ==
Year	Team	GP	GS	MPG	FG%	3P%	FT%	RPG	APG	SPG	BPG	PPG
2013–14	Fujian Sturgeons	31	31	42.3	.469	.394	.783	5.7	4.1	1.5	0.1	16.6
2015–16	Zhejiang Golden Bulls	38	38	39.3	.413	.335	.756	6.1	3.6	1.7	0.3	17.9

== Honours ==
=== National team ===
- FIBA Asia Championship
  - Gold medal: 2007, 2009, 2013
- Asian Games
  - Bronze medal: 2006, 2010
- Asian Cup
  - Gold medal: 2012
- Asian Indoor Games
  - Gold medal: 2009

=== Club ===
- Asian Championship
  - Gold medal: 2007, 2008 (Saba Battery), 2009, 2010 (Mahram)
- West Asian Championship
  - Gold medal: 2003 (Sanam), 2009, 2010, 2012 (Mahram)
- Iranian Super League
  - Champions: 2003, 2005 (Sanam), 2008, 2009, 2010, 2011, 2012 (Mahram)

Olympic Games
Preceded by Zahra Nemati	Flagbearer for Iran (with Hanieh Rostamian); Tokyo 2020	Succeeded by Incumbent
