= 2012 West Asian Basketball League =

The 2012 West Asian Basketball League was the 2nd season of the modern era of the West Asian Basketball League.

== Preliminary round ==
=== Group A ===
Team	Pld	W	L	PF	PA	PD	Pts
(Lebanon) Al-Riyadi Beirut	4	4	0	439	280	+159	8
(Iran) Zob Ahan Isfahan	4	3	1	331	302	+29	7
(Iran) Petrochimi Bandar Imam	4	2	2	350	258	+92	6
(Jordan) Aramex	4	1	3	308	335	−27	5
(Yemen) Al-Tilal	4	0	4	213	466	−253	4

January 11
16:00

Report

Al-Riyadi Beirut (Lebanon)	140–62	(Yemen) Al-Tilal
Scoring by quarter: 39–10, 37–25, 35–8, 29–19
Pts: Saoud 28; Rebs: Ahmed, Kanaan 8 Asts: Saoud 10		Pts: Yaeesh 13; Rebs: Abdulghafor 6 Asts: Al-Qaisi 5

Manara Court, Beirut

January 11
18:00

Report

Petrochimi Bandar Imam (Iran)	70–77	(Iran) Zob Ahan Isfahan
Scoring by quarter: 22–17, 18–21, 15–16, 15–23
Pts: Hubálek 30; Rebs: Parker, Hubálek 7 Asts: Nasajpour 6		Pts: Sahakian 29; Rebs: Woods 19; Asts: Baheran 6

Manara Court, Beirut

January 12
16:00

Report

Aramex (Jordan)	78–111	(Lebanon) Al-Riyadi Beirut
Scoring by quarter: 17–26, 18–26, 24–34, 19–25
Pts: Herring 21; Rebs: Adais 12; Asts: Herring 5		Pts: Ahmed 25; Rebs: Ahmed 14; Asts: Mahmoud 6

Manara Court, Beirut

January 12
18:00

Report

Al-Tilal (Yemen)	42–119	(Iran) Petrochimi Bandar Imam
Scoring by quarter: 6–31, 13–30, 9–28, 14–30
Pts: Al-Qaisi 9 Rebs: Mashda 6 Asts: Al-Rashedi 4		Pts: Koochoie 21; Rebs: Foroutan 8 Asts: Nasajpour 7

Manara Court, Beirut

January 13
16:00

Report

Zob Ahan Isfahan (Iran)	103–57	(Yemen) Al-Tilal
Scoring by quarter: 28–11, 21–12, 22–17, 32–17
Pts: Woods 22; Rebs: Woods 12; Asts: Akbari, Honarmand 6		Pts: Macalou 19; Rebs: Macalou 7 Asts: Al-Qaisi, Macalou 3

Manara Court, Beirut

January 13
18:00

Report

Petrochimi Bandar Imam (Iran)	85–55	(Jordan) Aramex
Scoring by quarter: 14–16, 17–12, 31–11, 23–16
Pts: Hubálek 29; Rebs: Hubálek 13; Asts: Parker, Sohrabnejad 6		Pts: Kamel, Adais 11; Rebs: Adais 15; Asts: Al-Zubi 4

Manara Court, Beirut

January 14
16:00

Report

Aramex (Jordan)	71–87	(Iran) Zob Ahan Isfahan
Scoring by quarter: 17–25, 18–19, 20–16, 16–27
Pts: Adais 26; Rebs: Adais 14; Asts: Adais 3		Pts: Woods 22; Rebs: Woods 11; Asts: Davoudi 6

Manara Court, Beirut

January 14
18:00

Report

Al-Riyadi Beirut (Lebanon)	84–76	(Iran) Petrochimi Bandar Imam
Scoring by quarter: 22–26, 17–16, 29–12, 16–22
Pts: Abdelnour 20; Rebs: Ahmed 13; Asts: Spencer 7		Pts: Jamshidi 25; Rebs: Sohrabnejad 9 Asts: Hubálek 3

Manara Court, Beirut

January 15
16:00

Report

Al-Tilal (Yemen)	52–104	(Jordan) Aramex
Scoring by quarter: 9–24, 21–25, 16–25, 6–30
Pts: Saplana 16; Rebs: Macalou 9 Asts: Al-Qaisi 5		Pts: Adais 20; Rebs: Adais 16; Asts: Al-Zubi 7

Manara Court, Beirut

January 15
18:00

Report

Zob Ahan Isfahan (Iran)	64–104	(Lebanon) Al-Riyadi Beirut
Scoring by quarter: 9–30, 19–21, 23–25, 13–28
Pts: Woods 31; Rebs: Woods 26; Asts: Davoudi 7		Pts: Spencer 30; Rebs: Ahmed 10; Asts: Mahmoud 8

Manara Court, Beirut

=== Group B ===
Team	Pld	W	L	PF	PA	PD	Pts
(Iran) Mahram Tehran	4	4	0	348	259	+89	8
(Lebanon) Champville	4	3	1	343	304	+39	7
(Lebanon) Al-Mouttahed Tripoli	4	2	2	318	358	−40	6
(Iraq) Duhok	4	1	3	356	389	−33	5
(Jordan) ASU	4	0	4	301	356	−55	4

January 25
16:00

Report

Champville (Lebanon)	98–91	(Iraq) Duhok
Scoring by quarter: 25–22, 25–24, 21–25, 27–20
Pts: Hoskin 30; Rebs: Thompson 13; Asts: Ibrahim 5		Pts: Battles 22; Rebs: Battles 16; Asts: Q. Abdullah 6

Dik El-Mehdi, Beirut

January 25
18:00

Report

Al-Mouttahed Tripoli (Lebanon)	73–106	(Iran) Mahram Tehran
Scoring by quarter: 22–22, 17–19, 13–38, 21–27
Pts: Johnson 17; Rebs: Daniels 7 Asts: Johnson 4		Pts: Nikkhah 21; Rebs: Nikkhah 12; Asts: Kamrani, Tskitishvili 5

Dik El-Mehdi, Beirut

January 26
16:00

Report

ASU (Jordan)	70–84	(Lebanon) Champville
Scoring by quarter: 18–23, 16–17, 13–16, 23–28
Pts: Henderson 23; Rebs: Henderson, Abbas 6 Asts: Al-Awadi 4		Pts: El Khatib 23; Rebs: Thompson 14; Asts: Stephan 6

Dik El-Mehdi, Beirut

January 26
18:00

Report

Duhok (Iraq)	87–97	(Lebanon) Al-Mouttahed Tripoli
Scoring by quarter: 19–24, 26–20, 24–32, 18–21
Pts: Oguchi 29; Rebs: Q. Abdullah 5 Asts: Q. Abdullah 5		Pts: Johnson 37; Rebs: Bawji 13; Asts: Johnson 3

Dik El-Mehdi, Beirut

January 27
16:00

Report

Al-Mouttahed Tripoli (Lebanon)	72–68	(Jordan) ASU
Scoring by quarter: 26–15, 19–16, 11–18, 16–19
Pts: Johnson 23; Rebs: Bawji 11; Asts: Balaa 3		Pts: Al-Sous 15; Rebs: Hadrab 11; Asts: Al-Sous, Al-Awadi 6

Dik El-Mehdi, Beirut

January 27
18:00

Report

Mahram Tehran (Iran)	88–65	(Iraq) Duhok
Scoring by quarter: 26–24, 19–18, 22–18, 21–5
Pts: Tskitishvili 29; Rebs: Tskitishvili 14; Asts: Kamrani 7		Pts: A. Abdullah, Dheyaa 16; Rebs: Q. Abdullah, Ahmad 4 Asts: Amer, A. Abdullah 3

Dik El-Mehdi, Beirut

January 28
16:00

Report

Champville (Lebanon)	97–76	(Lebanon) Al-Mouttahed Tripoli
Scoring by quarter: 19–25, 27–16, 25–21, 26–14
Pts: El Khatib 26; Rebs: Hoskin 15; Asts: Stephan, El Khatib 5		Pts: Johnson 21; Rebs: Balaa 7 Asts: Johnson 5

Dik El-Mehdi, Beirut

January 28
18:00

Report

ASU (Jordan)	57–87	(Iran) Mahram Tehran
Scoring by quarter: 20–8, 11–38, 8–24, 18–17
Pts: Shaher 16; Rebs: Shaher 14; Asts: Day, Abdeen 2		Pts: Nikkhah 22; Rebs: Sow 13; Asts: Kamrani 5

Dik El-Mehdi, Beirut

January 29
16:00

Report

Duhok (Iraq)	113–106	(Jordan) ASU
Scoring by quarter: 29–31, 30–22, 16–24, 28–19
Pts: Battles 28; Rebs: Q. Abdullah 11; Asts: Oguchi 5		Pts: Day, Abbas 23; Rebs: Abbas 12; Asts: Day 5

Dik El-Mehdi, Beirut

January 29
18:00

Report

Mahram Tehran (Iran)	67–64	(Lebanon) Champville
Scoring by quarter: 21–17, 16–7, 15–9, 15–31
Pts: Nikkhah 20; Rebs: Sow 14; Asts: Kamrani 4		Pts: El Khatib 26; Rebs: Thompson 9 Asts: El Khatib 3

Dik El-Mehdi, Beirut

== Knockout round ==
Quarterfinals
B1	(Iran) Mahram	91	91	—
A4	(Jordan) Aramex	52	55	—
A2	(Iran) Zob Ahan	74	82	—
B3	(Lebanon) Al-Mouttahed	71	78	—
A1	(Lebanon) Al-Riyadi	108	114	—
B4	(Iraq) Duhok	93	91	—
B2	(Lebanon) Champville	79	84	—
A3	(Iran) Petrochimi	66	71	—

Semifinals
B1	(Iran) Mahram	100	88	99
A2	(Iran) Zob Ahan	86	91	85
A1	(Lebanon) Al-Riyadi	104	78	93
B2	(Lebanon) Champville	100	85	67

Final
B1	(Iran) Mahram	87	67	92	93	96
A1	(Lebanon) Al-Riyadi	91	59	76	101	86

=== Quarterfinals ===
Mahram vs. Aramex

February 6
18:00

Aramex (Jordan)	52–91	(Iran) Mahram Tehran
Scoring by quarter: 11–29, 16–23, 14–22, 11–17
Pts: Zaghab 14; Rebs: Asts:		Pts: Sedighi, Tskitishvili 13; Rebs: Asts:

Prince Hamzah Court, Amman

February 21
19:30

Report

Mahram Tehran (Iran)	91–55	(Jordan) Aramex
Scoring by quarter: 31–13, 23–13, 19–8, 18–21
Pts: Sedighi 17; Rebs: Dargi 9 Asts: Nikkhah 5		Pts: Bostami 15; Rebs: Jabri 9 Asts: Jabri 2

Azadi Basketball Hall, Tehran

Zob Ahan vs. Al-Mouttahed

February 7
18:00

Report

Al-Mouttahed Tripoli (Lebanon)	71–74	(Iran) Zob Ahan Isfahan
Scoring by quarter: 21–15, 10–25, 20–15, 20–19
Pts: Johnson 22; Rebs: Bawji 14; Asts: Balaa 5		Pts: Woods 29; Rebs: Woods 15; Asts: Davoudi 4

Amchit Court, Byblos

February 20
17:30

Report

Zob Ahan Isfahan (Iran)	82–78	(Lebanon) Al-Mouttahed Tripoli
Scoring by quarter: 17–18, 14–22, 25–13, 26–25
Pts: Woods 27; Rebs: Akbari 8 Asts: Davoudi 8		Pts: Johnson 19; Rebs: Brand 9 Asts: Johnson 7

Mellat Arena, Isfahan

Al-Riyadi vs. Duhok

February 14
17:00

Duhok (Iraq)	93–108	(Lebanon) Al-Riyadi Beirut
Scoring by quarter: 23–24, 20–20, 23–32, 27–32
Pts: Tarver 33; Rebs: Asts:		Pts: Spencer, Ahmed 25; Rebs: Saoud 14; Asts: Spencer 9

Education College Sports, Duhok

February 28
16:00

Report

Al-Riyadi Beirut (Lebanon)	114–91	(Iraq) Duhok
Scoring by quarter: 38–15, 15–20, 29–33, 32–23
Pts: Spencer 34; Rebs: Ahmed 12; Asts: Mahmoud 7		Pts: Battles 37; Rebs: Battles 18; Asts: Q. Abdullah 6

Manara Court, Beirut

Champville vs. Petrochimi

February 13
17:30

Report

Petrochimi Bandar Imam (Iran)	66–79	(Lebanon) Champville
Scoring by quarter: 18–18, 6–11, 15–28, 27–22
Pts: Hubálek 19; Rebs: Rezaei 5 Asts: Forte 3		Pts: Hoskin 29; Rebs: Thompson, Hoskin, El Khatib 11; Asts: El Khatib 6

Andisheh Arena, Mahshahr

February 27
18:00

Report

Champville (Lebanon)	84–71	(Iran) Petrochimi Bandar Imam
Scoring by quarter: 29–23, 18–15, 11–20, 26–13
Pts: El Khatib 29; Rebs: Thompson 11; Asts: El Khatib 6		Pts: Akindele 26; Rebs: Akindele 11; Asts: Forte 3

Dik El-Mehdi, Beirut

=== Semifinals ===
Mahram vs. Zob Ahan

March 5
17:30

Report

Mahram Tehran (Iran)	100–86	(Iran) Zob Ahan Isfahan
Scoring by quarter: 23–13, 24–31, 24–22, 29–20
Pts: Nikkhah 27; Rebs: Tskitishvili 20; Asts: Nikkhah 5		Pts: Anderson 47; Rebs: Woods 14; Asts: Davoudi 6

Azadi Basketball Hall, Tehran

March 12
17:30

Report

Zob Ahan Isfahan (Iran)	91–88 (OT)	(Iran) Mahram Tehran
Scoring by quarter: 17–16, 27–25, 15–26, 22–14, Overtime: 10–7
Pts: Anderson 21; Rebs: Woods 8 Asts: Anderson 8		Pts: Tskitishvili, Nikkhah 22; Rebs: Tskitishvili 11; Asts: Kamrani, Nikkhah 5

Mellat Arena, Isfahan

March 20
16:00

Report

Mahram Tehran (Iran)	99–85	(Iran) Zob Ahan Isfahan
Scoring by quarter: 19–22, 16–20, 28–18, 36–25
Pts: Nikkhah 37; Rebs: Tskitishvili 17; Asts: Kamrani 5		Pts: Anderson 27; Rebs: Woods 13; Asts: Baheran, Davoudi, Woods 2

Azadi Basketball Hall, Tehran

Al-Riyadi vs. Champville

March 6
18:00

Report

Al-Riyadi Beirut (Lebanon)	104–100 (2OT)	(Lebanon) Champville
Scoring by quarter: 26–23, 26–18, 16–18, 17–26, Overtime: 6–6, 13–9
Pts: Spencer 31; Rebs: Ahmed 11; Asts: Mahmoud, Ahmed 4		Pts: Hoskin 33; Rebs: Hoskin 11; Asts: Ibrahim 6

Manara Court, Beirut

March 13
18:00

Report

Champville (Lebanon)	85–78	(Lebanon) Al-Riyadi Beirut
Scoring by quarter: 24–20, 17–19, 22–23, 22–16
Pts: El Khatib 27; Rebs: Hawe 16; Asts: El Khatib 4		Pts: Ahmed 24; Rebs: Ahmed 11; Asts: Spencer 5

Dik El-Mehdi, Beirut

March 20
18:00

Report

Al-Riyadi Beirut (Lebanon)	93–67	(Lebanon) Champville
Scoring by quarter: 23–12, 23–15, 29–12, 18–28
Pts: El Turk 23; Rebs: Abdelnour 12; Asts: Spencer 6		Pts: Ibrahim 20; Rebs: El Khatib 7 Asts: Dandache, Stephan 2

Manara Court, Beirut

=== Final ===
Mahram vs. Al-Riyadi

April 2
18:00

Report

Al-Riyadi Beirut (Lebanon)	91–87	(Iran) Mahram Tehran
Scoring by quarter: 23–18, 29–22, 22–25, 17–22
Pts: Spencer 39; Rebs: Ahmed 11; Asts: Spencer 7		Pts: Sow 22; Rebs: Sow 10; Asts: Kamrani 7

Manara Court, Beirut

April 3
18:00

Report

Al-Riyadi Beirut (Lebanon)	59–67	(Iran) Mahram Tehran
Scoring by quarter: 26–18, 12–15, 14–19, 7–15
Pts: Ahmed 17; Rebs: Ahmed 9 Asts: Spencer 4		Pts: Tskitishvili 25; Rebs: Tskitishvili 18; Asts: Kamrani 6

Manara Court, Beirut

April 9
19:30

Report

Mahram Tehran (Iran)	92–76	(Lebanon) Al-Riyadi Beirut
Scoring by quarter: 12–14, 23–23, 29–24, 28–15
Pts: Nikkhah 29; Rebs: Sow 14; Asts: Kamrani 4		Pts: Spencer 21; Rebs: Spencer 8 Asts: Kanaan 3

Azadi Basketball Hall, Tehran

April 10
19:30

Report

Mahram Tehran (Iran)	93–101	(Lebanon) Al-Riyadi Beirut
Scoring by quarter: 17–17, 25–20, 23–28, 28–36
Pts: Kamrani 28; Rebs: Nikkhah 12; Asts: Nikkhah 3		Pts: Spencer 36; Rebs: Spencer, El Turk, Pharis 8 Asts: Spencer 3

Azadi Basketball Hall, Tehran

April 16
19:15

Report

Mahram Tehran (Iran)	96–86	(Lebanon) Al-Riyadi Beirut
Scoring by quarter: 31–13, 19–21, 30–34, 16–18
Pts: Nikkhah 28; Rebs: Sow 11; Asts: Sow 4		Pts: Abdelnour, Spencer 24; Rebs: Ahmed 20; Asts: Ahmed 4

Azadi Basketball Hall, Tehran
