= Mehrad Atashi =

Iranian basketball player

No. 4 – Chemidor Qom
- Position: Guard
- League: IBSL

Personal information
- Born: February 25, 1986 (age 40) Rey, Iran
- Listed height: 6 ft 4 in (1.93 m)
- Listed weight: 187 lb (85 kg)

Career information
- Playing career: 2006–present

Career history
- 2004–2005: Sanam Tehran
- 2006–2007: Petrochimi Imam
- 2007–2011: Mahram Tehran
- 2011–2012: Petrochimi Imam
- 2012–2013: Esteghlal Qeshm
- 2013–2014: Sanaye Petrochimi
- 2014–2015: Mahram Tehran
- 2015–2016: Naft Abadan
- 2016–2017: Petrochimi Imam
- 2017–2018: Naft Abadan
- 2018–2020: Mahram Tehran
- 2020–2021: Chemidor Qom

Mehrad Atashi
Medal record

Men's basketball

Representing Iran

Asian Under-18 Championship
Gold medal – first place	2004 Bangalore	Team

Mehrad Atashi (Persian: مهراد آتشی, born February 25, 1986, in Rey, Iran) is an Iranian professional basketball player. He currently plays for Chemidor Qom in Iranian Basketball Super League as well as with the Iranian national basketball team, as a Guard.

== National team ==
He was selected to play for Iran national team in 2010 World Championship held in Turkey. And also was a member of national team in 2011 FIBA Asia Championship.

== Honours ==
=== National team ===
- Asian Under-18 Championship
  - Gold medal: 2004

=== Club ===
- Asian Championship
  - Gold medal: 2009, 2010 (Mahram)
- West Asian Championship
  - Gold medal: 2009, 2010 (Mahram)
- Iranian Super League
  - Champions: 2005 (Sanam), 2008, 2009, 2010, 2011 (Mahram)
