= Slobodan Agoč =

Serbian basketball player (born 1977)

Personal information
- Born: 18 January 1977 (age 49) Novi Sad, SR Serbia, SFR Yugoslavia
- Listed height: 2.06 m (6 ft 9 in)

Career information
- Playing career: 1997–2013
- Position: Power forward
- Coaching career: 2016–present

Career history

Playing
- 1997–1998: Borovica Ruma
- 1998–1999: Ibon Nikšić
- 1999–2000: Vojvodina
- 2000–2001: Zastava Kragujevac
- 2001–2002: Sloga
- 2002–2004: Beopetrol
- 2004–2005: Lovćen
- 2005–2006: BC Timișoara
- 2006–2007: Hamyari Shahrdari Zanjan
- 2007: BC Al Hala
- 2007–2008: MZT Skopje
- 2008–2009: AMAK SP
- 2009–2010: Towzin Electric
- 2010: Novi Sad
- 2010–2011: Vojvodina Srbijagas
- 2011–2012: BC Pouya Tajik
- 2012–2013: Vojvodina Srbijagas

Coaching
- 2016–2019: Vojvodina (assistant)
- 2017–2021: Vojvodina (U19 coach)
- 2021–2022: Spartak Subotica (assistant)

Slobodan Agoč (Serbian Cyrillic: Слободан Агоч; born 18 January 1977) is a Serbian professional basketball coach and former player.

== Personal life ==
His son, Stefan (born 2002) is a basketball player, also. Stefan was a member of the Serbia national under-16 team at the 2018 FIBA Europe Under-16 Championship.
