= Mohammad Hassanzadeh =

Iranian basketball player

No. 7 – Zob Ahan Isfahan BC
- Position: Power forward
- League: Iranian League

Personal information
- Born: 6 October 1990 (age 36) Shiraz, Iran
- Listed height: 2.04
- Listed weight: 104

Career information
- Playing career: 2008–present

Career history
- 2008–2010: Saba Mehr
- 2010–2011: Towzin Electric
- 2011–2012: Foolad Mahan
- 2012–2015: Azad University
- 2015–2019: Sanat Naft Abadan
- 2019–2020: Petrochimi Bandar Imam
- 2020–2021: Sanat Naft Abadan
- 2021–2022: Mahram Tehran
- 2022–present: Zob Ahan Isfahan BC

Career highlights
- Iranian Basketball Super League MVP (2018-19)
Medals
Men's basketball
Representing Iran
Asian Games
| Silver medal – second place | 2018 Jakarta | Team |
Asian Championship
| Bronze medal – third place | 2015 Changsha |
Asian Cup
| Gold medal – first place | 2016 Tehran |
Asian Under-18 Championship
| Gold medal – first place | 2008 Tehran |
William Jones Cup
| Gold medal – first place | 2015 Taipei |
| Silver medal – second place | 2012 Taipei |

Mohammad Hassanzadeh Saberi Akhlaghi (Persian: محمد حسن‌زاده صابری اخلاقی, born 6 October 1990, in Shiraz) is an Iranian professional basketball player. He currently plays for Zob Ahan Isfahan in the Iranian Super League as well as for the Iranian national basketball team, as a forward. He participated in his first major international competition for the Iranian team at the 2010 FIBA World Championship in Turkey. He is 6 ft 7 in (2.01 m) tall.

== Honours ==
=== National team ===
- Qualify To 2009 FIBA Under-19 World Championship with Iran national basketball team
- Qualify To 2010 FIBA Basketball World Cup with Iran national basketball team
- Qualify To 2019 FIBA Basketball World Cup with Iran national basketball team
- Qualify To the 2020 Olympic with the Iranian national team
- Asian Under-18 Championship
- 2008 FIBA Asia Under-18 Championship - Gold Medal
- FIBA Asia Cup 2008 Tokushima - Gold Medal
- 2015 FIBA Asia Championship - Bronze Medal
- William Jones Cup 2015 - Gold Medal
- William Jones Cup 2014 - Silver Medal
- FIBA Asia Cup 2013 - Gold Medal
- 2012 FIBA Asia Cup - Gold Medal
- 2014 FIBA Asia Cup - Gold Medal
- 2016 FIBA Asia Challenge - Gold Medal
