= Nikoloz Tskitishvili =

Georgian basketball player (born 1983)

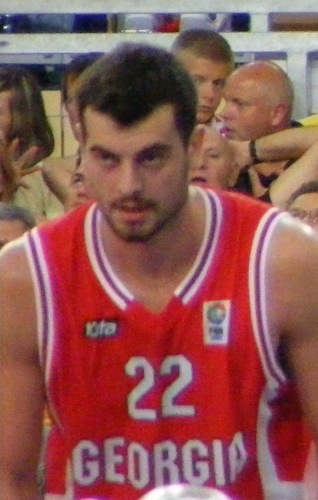
- Tskitishvili, with the Georgian NT, in 2010.

Personal information
- Born: April 14, 1983 (age 43) Tbilisi, Georgian SSR, Soviet Union
- Listed height: 7 ft 0 in (2.13 m)
- Listed weight: 245 lb (111 kg)

Career information
- NBA draft: 2002: 1st round, 5th overall pick
- Drafted by: Denver Nuggets
- Playing career: 1997–2019
- Position: Power forward / center
- Number: 22, 20, 17, 15

Career history
- 1997–1999: Kolkha
- 1999–2001: KD Slovan
- 2002: Benetton Treviso
- 2002–2005: Denver Nuggets
- 2005: Golden State Warriors
- 2005–2006: Minnesota Timberwolves
- 2006: Phoenix Suns
- 2007: Caja San Fernando
- 2007–2008: Siviglia Wear Teramo
- 2008–2009: Alta Gestión Fuenlabrada
- 2009: Panionios
- 2009–2010: Alta Gestión Fuenlabrada
- 2010–2011: Lagun Aro GBC
- 2011–2012: Mahram Tehran
- 2012: Foolad Mahan Isfahan
- 2012–2013: Champville
- 2013–2014: Al Sharjah
- 2014–2015: Champville
- 2015: Link Tochigi Brex
- 2015–2016: Champville
- 2016: Chemidor Tehran
- 2016–2017: Al Manama
- 2017: Dinamo Tbilisi
- 2017–2018: Byblos Club
- 2018: BC Sokhumi
- 2019: Beirut Club
- 2019: Henan Golden Elephants

Career highlights
- Italian League champion (2002); Italian Supercup winner (2002); Iranian Super League champion (2012); WABA Champions Cup champion (2012); Asia Champions Cup champion (2012)
- Stats at NBA.com
- Stats at Basketball Reference

Nikoloz Tskitishvili (Georgian: ნიკოლოზ ცქიტიშვილი; born April 14, 1983) is a Georgian former professional basketball player. At 7 feet tall, he played as power forward-center. Tskitishvili was selected fifth overall by the Denver Nuggets in the 2002 NBA draft. He also played for the senior Georgian national basketball team.

== Professional career ==
=== Europe ===
From January to July 2002, Tskitishvili played in Italy, for Benetton Treviso, winning the Italian League championship under head coach Mike D'Antoni. He played in 13 games, averaging 6.6 points per game (with a high of 15). Around that time, he was selected as the 5th overall pick of the 2002 NBA draft.

=== NBA ===
On February 25, 2005, Tskitishvili was traded by the Nuggets, to the Golden State Warriors, along with Rodney White, in exchange for Eduardo Nájera, Luis Flores, and a 2007 future first-round draft pick. In three seasons with the Nuggets, Tskitishvili averaged 3.8 points and 1.9 rebounds per game, and shot 30 percent from the field, while appearing in 143 total games.

After playing just 12 games for the Warriors, he signed as a free agent with the Minnesota Timberwolves, after playing on their NBA Summer League team. He was traded half-way through the 2005–06 season, to the Phoenix Suns, in exchange for a second-round draft pick.

Tskitishvili's final NBA game was Game 4 of the 2006 Western Conference Finals on May 30, 2006, in a 106–86 win over the Dallas Mavericks. Tskitishvili only played for a minute and half (substituting at the very end of the game for Leandro Barbosa) and recorded no stats. Phoenix would go on to lose games 5 and 6 (with Tskitishvili not playing in either game), thus losing the series to Dallas 4 - 2.

On June 30, 2006, Tskitishvili was claimed off of waivers by the Portland Trail Blazers. He was waived five days later, after the team announced they would re-sign center Joel Przybilla. On October 2, 2006, Tskitishvili was signed by the New York Knicks, and he was later waived by them on October 25.

With career averages of 2.9 points and 1.8 rebounds per game, over his first four NBA seasons, Tskitishvili is widely considered to be a major draft bust. Former ESPN writer Bill Simmons claimed that Tskitishvili is "the worst-case scenario for any foreign pick" in the NBA. Columnist David Schoenfield of ESPN's Page 2, ranked Tskitishvili 30th, on his "100 worst draft picks ever", in 2006, and in 2008, ESPN's Adam Reisinger rated Tskitishvili as the worst NBA draft lottery pick ever selected.

=== Return to Europe ===
After playing in the NBA, Tskitishvili returned to Europe. In Europe, he had playing stints in the Spanish League (Caja San Fernando, Fuenlabrada, Lagun Aro GBC), Italian League (Teramo Basket), and Greek League (Panionios). After that, he left Europe and went to Asia, in order to continue his playing career.

=== Asia ===
While playing in Iran, Tskitishvili won an Iranian Super League championship in 2012, with Mahram. He started the 2012–13 season with Iran's Foolad Mahan Esfahan, but he was released in November 2012. The next month, he signed with Champville, from Lebanon's Division A, and posted 17.9 points, 10.9 rebounds, and 1.5 blocks per game, in 27 games played. On October 27, 2014, he signed for a second stint with Champville.

=== NBA comeback attempt ===
On September 25, 2015, Tskitishvili signed with the Los Angeles Clippers, returning to the NBA, after a nine-year absence. However, he was later waived by the Clippers, on October 3, 2015.

=== Return to Asia ===
On October 11, 2015, Tskitishvili signed with the Fujian Sturgeons of the Chinese Basketball Association (CBA). However, he left the team before the season began, and signed with the Japanese club, Link Tochigi Brex, on November 2. On December 24, he left Tochigi Brex, after averaging eight points and four rebounds per game.

The next day, he returned to Champville. On April 3, 2016, he left Champville, and signed with Chemidor Tehran, of the Iranian Super League.

In late December 2017, he signed with Byblos Club, of the Lebanese Basketball League.

== Career statistics ==
Legend
GP	Games played	GS	Games started	MPG	Minutes per game
FG%	Field goal percentage	3P%	3-point field goal percentage	FT%	Free throw percentage
RPG	Rebounds per game	APG	Assists per game	SPG	Steals per game
BPG	Blocks per game	PPG	Points per game	**Bold**	Career high

=== NBA ===
==== Regular season ====
Year	Team	GP	GS	MPG	FG%	3P%	FT%	RPG	APG	SPG	BPG	PPG
2002–03	Denver	**81**	**16**	**16.3**	.293	.243	.738	**2.2**	**1.1**	**0.4**	**0.4**	**3.9**
2003–04	Denver	39	0	7.9	.328	.273	**.793**	1.6	0.3	0.2	0.2	2.7
2004–05	Denver	23	0	6.9	.294	.000	.571	1.3	0.2	0.3	0.3	1.5
2004–05	Golden State	12	0	5.2	.304	.200	.000	1.0	0.5	0.0	0.3	1.3
2005–06	Minnesota	5	0	2.6	.250	.000	.500	0.4	0.0	0.0	0.0	0.6
2005–06	Phoenix	12	0	7.2	**.364**	**.333**	.667	1.7	0.3	0.1	0.2	2.8
Career		172	16	11.3	.304	.235	.730	1.8	0.7	0.3	0.2	2.9

==== Playoffs ====
Year	Team	GP	GS	MPG	FG%	3P%	FT%	RPG	APG	SPG	BPG	PPG
2005–06	Phoenix	4	0	2.0	.000	.000	.500	.3	.5	.0.	.0	.3
