= Mostafa Hashemi =

Iranian basketball player and coach

Mostafa Hashemi (Born 1962) is an Iranian basketball coach.

He was a player of Iran national basketball team, also coach of Mahram Basketball club, Chemidor Tehran BC and assistant coach of Iran national basketball team.
