= Ali Doraghi =

Iranian professional basketball player

Naft Abadan
- Position: Center
- League: Iranian League

Personal information
- Born: September 20, 1984 (age 42) Ahvaz, Iran
- Listed height: 6 ft 11 in (2.11 m)
- Listed weight: 235 lb (107 kg)

Career information
- Playing career: 2004–present

Career history
- 2004–2008: Petrochimi
- 2008–2010: a.s Bond
- 2010–2011: Towzin Electric
- 2011–2012: Melli Haffari
- 2012–2015: Petrochimi
- 2015–2016: Samen Mashhad
- 2017: Niroo Ahvaz
- 2018: Naft Abadan
- 2019–2020: Exxon Sport Club
- 2020–2021: Khane Khouzestan
- 2021–2022: Naft Abadan

Ali Doraghi
Medal record

Men's basketball

Representing Iran

Asian Games
Bronze medal – third place	2010 Guangzhou	Team

Asian Championship
Gold medal – first place	2007 Tokushima	Team
Gold medal – first place	2009 Tianjin	Team

Ali Doraghi (Persian: علی دورقی, born September 20, 1984) is an Iranian professional basketball player, currently playing as a center for Naft Abadan in the Iranian Basketball Super League. He is also a member of the Iranian national basketball team that won the gold medal at the FIBA Asia Championship 2007 and he competed at the 2008 Olympic Basketball Tournament. He is 6 ft 11 in (2.11 m) in height.

== Honours ==
=== National team ===
- Asian Championship
  - Gold medal: 2007, 2009
- Asian Games
  - Bronze medal: 2010
- Asian Under-20 Championship
  - Gold medal: 2004
