= Chemidor Tehran BC =

Iranian basketball club

Chemidor Qom
- Leagues: Iranian Super League
- Founded: 2009; 16 years ago
- Arena: Shahid Heidarian
- Location: Qom, Iran
- Team colors: White and purple
- President: Henrik Derghokasian
- Head coach: Mostafa Hashemi
- Championships: (1) WABA Cup
- Website: chemidorsportclub.com

Chemidor Qom Basketball Club is an Iranian professional basketball team based in Qom and was founded in 2009. The team compete in the Iranian Super League. They play their home games at Shahid Heidarian Arena.

== Franchise history ==
Chemidor Qom BC started to play in the Tehran province basketball league in 2014 and they became champion and Qualified to Iran's division 2. In Iran's division 2 league they became champion and Qualified to Iranian Super League in 2015.

== Tournament records ==
=== Iranian Super League ===
- 2015-2016 : 3rd place
- 2016-2017 : 5th place
- 2017-2018 : —
- 2018-2019 : 1st place in west asia championship and 3rd place in Iranian Super League
- 2019-2020 : —
- 2020-2021 : 3rd place

== Players ==
=== Current roster ===
Note: Flags indicate national team eligibility at FIBA-sanctioned events. Players may hold other non-FIBA nationalities not displayed.

Chemidor Qom roster
Players
Coaches

Pos.	No.	Nat.	Name	Ht.	Wt.	Age
PG	2	(Iran)	Rafi Derghokasian	1.78 m (5 ft 10 in)	78 kg (172 lb)	26 – 28 April 1998
	3	(Iran)	Ali Daryaei	1.96 m (6 ft 5 in)	89 kg (196 lb)
SG	4	(Iran)	Mehrad Atashi	1.91 m (6 ft 3 in)	85 kg (187 lb)	39 – 25 February 1986
	5	(Iran)	Emad Salmani	1.87 m (6 ft 2 in)	90 kg (198 lb)	34 – 2 August 1990
SG	6	(Iran)	Vahid Hajian	1.88 m (6 ft 2 in)	84 kg (185 lb)
SG	8	(Iran)	Ehsan Samadi	1.94 m (6 ft 4 in)	88 kg (194 lb)	26 – 3 April 1998
PF	9	(Iran)	Morteza Taheri	2.04 m (6 ft 8 in)	104 kg (229 lb)	28 – 18 August 1996
PF	10	(Iran)	Miro Ghazari Moghaddam	1.94 m (6 ft 4 in)	98 kg (216 lb)	27 – 17 January 1998
C	11	(Iran)	Mehdi Esmaeili	2.05 m (6 ft 9 in)	114 kg (251 lb)	41 – 17 January 1984
	13	(Iran)	Navid Khajehzadeh	1.95 m (6 ft 5 in)	92 kg (203 lb)
PF	14	(Iran)	Arsalan Kazemi	2.00 m (6 ft 7 in)	102 kg (225 lb)	34 – 22 April 1990
C	41	(Iran)	Ali Asgarinejad	2.12 m (6 ft 11 in)	95 kg (209 lb)
SF	86	(Iran)	Amirhossein Azari	1.93 m (6 ft 4 in)	97 kg (214 lb)	26 – 12 September 1998
F/C		(Nigeria)	Ike Diogu	2.06 m (6 ft 9 in)	116 kg (256 lb)	41 – 11 September 1983

Head coach

- (Iran) Mostafa Hashemi

Assistant coach(es)

- (Iran) Ahmad Mazistan

Legend

- (C) Team captain
- Injured

- Roster
Updated: March 9, 2021

=== Notable players ===
- (Iran) Javad Davari
- (Iran) Amir Sedighi
- (Iran) Iman Zandi
- (Iran) Arman Zangeneh
- (Iran) Amir Amini
- (Iran) Farid Aslani
- (Iran) Sajjad Mashayekhi
- (Iran) Aren Davoudi
- (Iran) Mehdi Kamrani
- (Iran) Asghar Kardoust
- (Iran) Mohammad Jamshidi
- (Iran) Mike Rostampour
- (Iran) Vahid Dalirzahan
- (United States) Daequan Cook
- (United States) Robert Upshaw
- (Serbia) Nikola Popović
- (Serbia) Ivan Paunić
- (Georgia (country)) Nikoloz Tskitishvili
- (Dominican Republic) Eloy Vargas
- (France) Hervé Touré
- (Lithuania) Povilas Čukinas
