= Mohammad Jamshidi =

Iranian basketball player

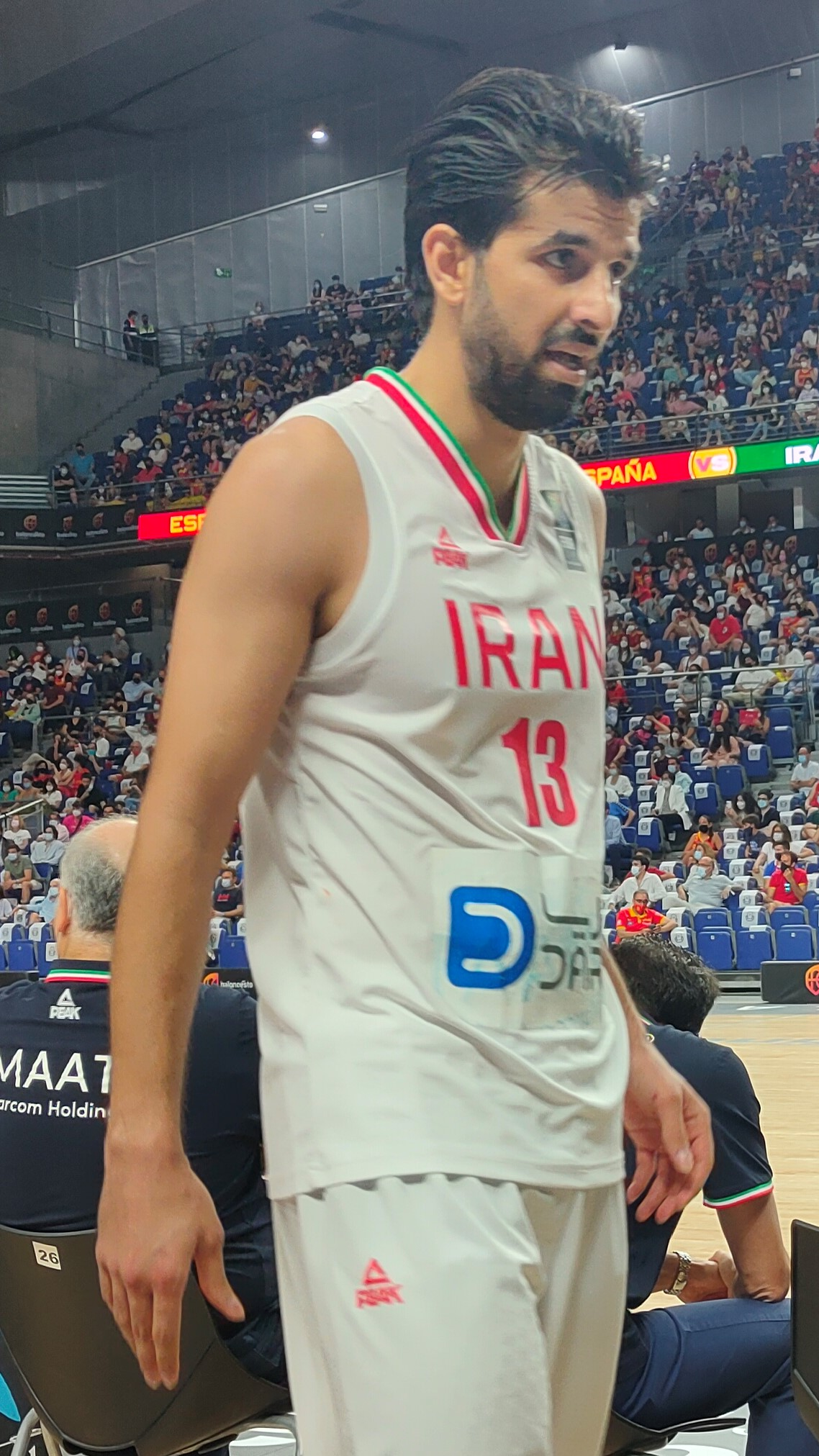
- 2021

No. 13 – Mahram Tehran
- Position: Shooting guard / small forward
- League: Iranian League

Personal information
- Born: 30 July 1991 (age 35) Shahr-e Kord, Iran
- Listed height: 6 ft 6 in (1.98 m)
- Listed weight: 210 lb (95 kg)

Career information
- Playing career: 2009–present

Career history
- 2009–2010: Petrochimi Imam
- 2010–2011: Towzin Kashan
- 2011–2012: Petrochimi Imam
- 2012–2015: Azad University
- 2015–2016: Naft Abadan
- 2016: Meralco Bolts
- 2017: Petrochimi Imam
- 2017–2018: Naft Abadan
- 2018–2020: Chemidor Qom
- 2020–2023: Shahrdari Gorgan
- 2023-present: Mahram Tehran
Medals
Men's basketball
Representing Iran
Asian Championship
Gold medal – first place	2013 Manila
Bronze medal – third place	2015 Changsha
Silver medal – second place	2017 Beirut
Asian Games
Silver medal – second place	2014 Incheon	Team
Silver medal – second place	2018 Jakarta	Team
Bronze medal – third place	2026 Aichi–Nagoya	Team
Asian Cup
Gold medal – first place	2012 Tokyo
Gold medal – first place	2014 Wuhan
Gold medal – first place	2016 Tehran

Mohammad Jamshidi Jafarabadi (Persian: محمد جمشیدی جعفرآبادی, born 30 July 1991), known as Mohammad Jamshidi, is an Iranian professional basketball player who is playing for the Mahram Tehran in the Iranian Super League. A 6'6" swingman, he is also a member of the Iranian men's national basketball team.
