= Loren Woods =

American basketball player (born 1978)

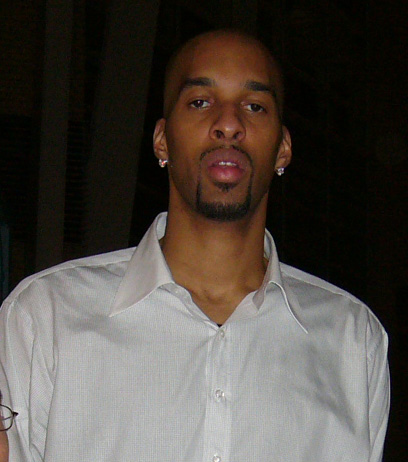
- Woods in 2005

Personal information
- Born: June 21, 1978 (age 48) St. Louis, Missouri, U.S.
- Listed height: 7 ft 1 in (2.16 m)
- Listed weight: 245 lb (111 kg)

Career information
- High school: Cardinal Ritter College Prep (St. Louis, Missouri)
- College: Wake Forest (1996–1998); Arizona (1999–2001)
- NBA draft: 2001: 2nd round, 46th overall pick
- Drafted by: Minnesota Timberwolves
- Playing career: 2001–2018
- Position: Center
- Number: 3, 1, 33

Career history
- 2001–2003: Minnesota Timberwolves
- 2003–2004: Miami Heat
- 2004–2006: Toronto Raptors
- 2007: Austin Toros
- 2007: Žalgiris Kaunas
- 2007–2008: Efes Pilsen
- 2008: Houston Rockets
- 2008–2009: Žalgiris Kaunas
- 2009: CAI Zaragoza
- 2009–2010: Mahram Tehran
- 2010–2011: Al Riyadi Beirut
- 2011–2012: Zob Ahan Isfahan
- 2012–2014: Al Riyadi Beirut
- 2016–2018: Al Hala
- 2018: Al Ahli

Career highlights
- 2× West Asian Basketball Cup champion (2010, 2011); Third-team Parade All-American (1996); McDonald's All-American (1996)
- Stats at NBA.com
- Stats at Basketball Reference
Medals
Men's basketball
Representing United States
Summer Universiade
Gold medal – first place	1997 Trapani	Team competition

Loren Gerard Woods (born June 21, 1978) is an American former professional basketball player. He previously played six seasons in the National Basketball Association (NBA).

== High school and college career ==
Born in St. Louis, Missouri, Woods attended high school at Cardinal Ritter College Prep. He started his college career at Wake Forest University, where he was supposed to take over the center position once Tim Duncan left. However, he transferred to the University of Arizona.

== Professional career ==
Woods was selected by the Minnesota Timberwolves in the second round of the 2001 NBA draft. After leaving the Timberwolves, Woods played for the Miami Heat and the Toronto Raptors, where he appeared in 45 games during the 2004–05 season and posted a career best 3.9 points per game. On 15 August 2006, he signed with the Sacramento Kings as a backup center, but he was waived before the season began.

Woods joined the Lithuanian giants Žalgiris Kaunas in 2007. In June 2007, he joined the Turkish side Efes Pilsen. He signed two 10-day contracts with the Houston Rockets on 21 March and 1 April 2008. He was then waived by the Rockets on 14 July 2008. he signed again with Žalgiris Kaunas on 16 July. His tenure with the Rockets ended up being his last time in the NBA, as his final game was Game 1 of the 2008 Western Conference First Round against the Utah Jazz on April 19, 2008. In his final game, Woods played for only one minute but was able to record 2 points and 1 rebound. Houston would go on to lose the series to Utah in 6 games.

Woods joined CAI Zaragoza in 2009.

In October 2010 he signed with Al Riyadi Beirut in Lebanon, where he averaged 14.3 points and 14.3 rebounds. In 2012, he signed with Al Riyadi Beirut again. On 20 December 2014 he was released by Al Riyadi Beirut.

== NBA career statistics ==
Legend
GP	Games played	GS	Games started	MPG	Minutes per game
FG%	Field goal percentage	3P%	3-point field goal percentage	FT%	Free throw percentage
RPG	Rebounds per game	APG	Assists per game	SPG	Steals per game
BPG	Blocks per game	PPG	Points per game	**Bold**	Career high

=== Regular season ===
Year	Team	GP	GS	MPG	FG%	3P%	FT%	RPG	APG	SPG	BPG	PPG
2001–02	Minnesota	**60**	0	8.6	.344	.000	.733	2.0	.4	**.3**	.6	1.8
2002–03	Minnesota	38	11	9.3	.382	**.333**	**.778**	2.5	**.5**	**.3**	.3	2.1
2003–04	Miami	38	2	13.3	.458	.000	.600	3.5	.3	**.3**	.5	3.2
2004–05	Toronto	45	**30**	**15.8**	.433	.000	.576	**4.9**	.4	.2	**.9**	**3.9**
2005–06	Toronto	27	4	12.0	.475	.000	.429	4.1	.1	**.3**	**.9**	2.3
2007–08	Houston	7	0	2.4	**.600**	.000	.000	.1	.3	.0	.0	.9
Career		215	47	11.3	.419	.143	.642	3.2	.3	.3	.6	2.6

=== Playoffs ===
Year	Team	GP	GS	MPG	FG%	3P%	FT%	RPG	APG	SPG	BPG	PPG
2003	Minnesota	**2**	0	1.0	.333	.000	.000	.5	.0	.0	.0	1.0
2004	Miami	1	0	**2.0**	.000	.000	.000	.0	.0	.0	.0	.0
2008	Houston	1	0	1.0	**1.000**	.000	.000	**1.0**	.0	.0	.0	**2.0**
Career		4	0	1.3	.500	.000	.000	.5	.0	.0	.0	1.0

=== Euroleague ===
Year	Team	GP	GS	MPG	FG%	3P%	FT%	RPG	APG	SPG	BPG	PPG	PIR
2007–08	Efes Pilsen	16	11	21.1	.590	.000	.766	6.5	.9	.8	1.4	8.0	13.8
2008–09	Žalgiris	8	8	31.2	.569	.000	.711	9.0	1.5	1.4	2.4	12.3	20.3

== National team career ==
In July 2013, Woods became a naturalized Lebanese citizen, and a member of their national basketball team.

After the 2013 suspension in which Lebanon were unable to compete FIBA competitions, he was once again called by 2015 head coach Veselin Matić as a solution to the 5 position for the coming 2015 FIBA Asia Championship in September.

== Acting career ==
Woods appeared in the 2022 holiday musical movie Spirited as The Ghost of Christmas Yet To Come.

== See also ==
- List of NCAA Division I men's basketball players with 13 or more blocks in a game
