= Zlatko Jovanović =

Bosnian basketball player

Alba Fehérvár
- Title: Head coach
- League: Nemzeti Bajnokság I/A

Personal information
- Born: January 15, 1984 (age 42) Zrenjanin, SR Serbia, SFR Yugoslavia
- Listed height: 1.85 m (6 ft 1 in)
- Listed weight: 85 kg (187 lb)

Career information
- NBA draft: 2006: undrafted
- Playing career: 2001–2020
- Position: Point guard
- Coaching career: 2021–present

Career history

Playing
- 2001–2002: Polet Keramika
- 2002–2003: Rudar Pljevlja
- 2003–2004: Banjalučka pivara
- 2004: Igokea
- 2004–2006: Banjalučka pivara
- 2006–2007: Borac Nektar
- 2007–2008: Novi Sad
- 2007–2008: Borac Nektar
- 2008–2009: Sloboda Tuzla
- 2009–2010: Bosna
- 2010: Borac Nektar
- 2010–2011: Towzin Electric
- 2011–2015: BC Timişoara
- 2015–2016: Sanat Naft Abadan
- 2016–2017: Spars Sarajevo
- 2017–2018: Union Tours Basket Métropole
- 2018–2019: Sloboda Tuzla
- 2019: Vendée Challans
- 2019–2020: Prievidza

Coaching
- 2021–2023: Komárno
- 2023–2026: Budapest Honvéd
- 2026–present: Alba Fehérvár

Zlatko Jovanović (born January 15, 1984) is a Bosnian professional basketball coach and former player, who is the current head coach for Alba Fehérvár of the Nemzeti Bajnokság I/A. He represented Bosnia and Herzegovina internationally as a player.
