= Cheikh Samb =

Senegalese basketball player

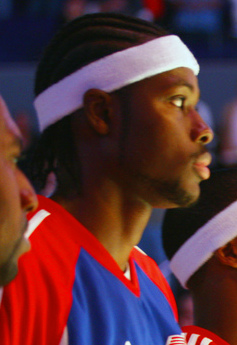
- Samb with the Los Angeles Clippers in 2009

Personal information
- Born: October 22, 1984 (age 42) Dakar, Senegal
- Listed height: 7 ft 1 in (2.16 m)
- Listed weight: 245 lb (111 kg)

Career information
- NBA draft: 2006: 2nd round, 51st overall pick
- Drafted by: Los Angeles Lakers
- Playing career: 2005–2017
- Position: Center
- Number: 35, 34, 25

Career history
- 2005–2007: WTC Cornellá
- 2007–2008: Detroit Pistons
- 2007–2008: →Fort Wayne Mad Ants
- 2008–2009: Denver Nuggets
- 2008–2009: →Colorado 14ers
- 2009: Los Angeles Clippers
- 2009: New York Knicks
- 2009-2010: Real Madrid
- 2010–2011: Mahram Tehran
- 2011–2017: Al-Ahli Dubai
- Stats at NBA.com
- Stats at Basketball Reference

Samb Cheikh Tidiane (born October 22, 1984) is a Senegalese former professional basketball player. He played at the center position.

== Basketball career ==
In the 2005–06 season, Samb played for WTC Cornellá in the Spanish second division, averaging 9.6 points, 7.7 rebounds and 3.1 blocks, shooting 51.4% from the field and 76.1% from the free-throw line, playing an average of 26 minutes per game in 29 games. He led the league in blocked shots, registering more blocks than the totals of all but one team in the league.

Samb was drafted by the Los Angeles Lakers in the second round (51st pick overall) of the 2006 NBA draft, but was traded that day to the Detroit Pistons for shooting guard Maurice Evans. After being drafted, he played for the Pistons in the NBA Summer League, averaging 7.2 points, 4.8 rebounds and 1.8 blocks, while shooting 65.2% from the field and 60.0% from the free-throw line. He would be loaned back to the same Spanish outfit for 2006–07.

In his second season with Cornellá, Samb averaged 10.5 points, 7.3 rebounds, and 2.9 blocks, while shooting 52% from the field, and 61% from the free-throw line, playing 24 minutes per game in only 19 games, in an injury-plagued season. Joining the Pistons for another Summer League, Samb posted slightly better numbers than in the previous edition, starting in four and playing in all five games. Subsequently, he signed a contract with the Pistons on July 17, 2007.

On November 16, 2007, Samb played his first NBA regular season game: against the Los Angeles Lakers, he had four rebounds, two points, and two blocks in 15 minutes, before being allocated to the NBA Development League, with the Fort Wayne Mad Ants, the first NBA player assigned to the team in their history.

On December 14, in his second D-League game, against the Dakota Wizards, Samb took an elbow to his mouth and lost two front teeth. The teeth, knocked out at the root, were subsequently put in a saline solution and he was taken to a dentist to have them reset. He also suffered a probable upper jawbone fracture.

Samb was recalled to the NBA on December 21, switching to the Mad Ants again on January 29, 2008. On February 3, he recorded a triple double with the Ants, with 12 points, 12 rebounds and 11 blocks. On March 22, he was once again recalled to the Pistons.

On November 3, 2008, Samb was traded along with Antonio McDyess and Chauncey Billups to the Denver Nuggets, in exchange for Allen Iverson. He (along with Sonny Weems) was later assigned to the Colorado 14ers, a team associated with the Nuggets in the NBA Development League. On January 5, 2009, the Nuggets traded Samb, along with cash considerations, to the Los Angeles Clippers for a conditional second-round draft pick.

On February 16, 2009, Samb was waived by the Clippers. On March 2, he signed a 10-day contract with the New York Knicks. After this expired on March 12, 2009, the Knicks signed him to a second 10-day contract and, on March 23, released the player, who made appeared in 2 games with them.

On October 1, 2009, he signed a one-month contract with Spanish giants Real Madrid. He only appeared in one game and was released in November.

He was on the Toronto Raptors' roster for the 2010 NBA Summer League. In the final game of Summer League, Samb scored 11 points, grabbed 15 rebounds and 7 blocked shots.

On November 1, 2010, Samb was drafted by the Sioux Falls Skyforce with the 11th overall pick in the 2010 NBA Development League Draft. He did not make the final 10 man roster, however.

Samb signed with defending Iranian Super League champions Mahram Tehran in December 2010.

== NBA career statistics ==
Legend
GP	Games played	GS	Games started	MPG	Minutes per game
FG%	Field goal percentage	3P%	3-point field goal percentage	FT%	Free throw percentage
RPG	Rebounds per game	APG	Assists per game	SPG	Steals per game
BPG	Blocks per game	PPG	Points per game	**Bold**	Career high

=== Regular season ===
Year	Team	GP	GS	MPG	FG%	3P%	FT%	RPG	APG	SPG	BPG	PPG
2007–08	Detroit	4	0	**7.8**	**.750**	–	.500	**1.8**	.0	**.3**	.5	**1.8**
2008–09	Denver	6	0	4.0	.154	.000	–	1.5	**.2**	**.3**	**.8**	0.7
2008–09	L.A. Clippers	**10**	0	5.1	.250	.000	**.600**	1.3	.0	.1	.5	1.1
2008–09	New York	2	0	4.0	.000	–	.000	1.0	.0	.0	.0	0.0
Career		22	0	5.2	.250	.000	.444	1.4	.0	.2	.5	1.0

== Personal life ==
Samb is the older brother of basketball player Mamadou Samb.
