= Chris Monroe (basketball) =

American basketball player (born 1981)

Personal information
- Born: January 19, 1981 (age 45) Silver Spring, Maryland, U.S.
- Listed height: 6 ft 3 in (1.91 m)
- Listed weight: 208 lb (94 kg)

Career information
- High school: Good Counsel (Olney, Maryland)
- College: George Washington (1999–2003)
- NBA draft: 2003: undrafted
- Playing career: 2003–2013
- Position: Shooting guard / point guard

Career history
- 2003: Dexia Mons-Hainaut
- 2003–2004: BK Kalendermacher Klosterneuburg
- 2004: Florence Flyers
- 2004–2006: Atomerőmű SE
- 2006–2007: Edimes Pavia
- 2007–2008: Eldo Napoli
- 2008–2009: Chorale Roanne
- 2009–2010: PAOK Thessaloniki
- 2010: Armani Jeans Milano
- 2010–2011: Enel Brindisi
- 2011: Zob Ahan
- 2011: Budivelnyk Kyiv
- 2011–2012: KAOD
- 2012: Khimik Yuzhny
- 2012–2013: Ural Ekaterinburg

Career highlights
- 2× Hungarian League champion (2005, 2006); Hungarian Cup winner (2005); Hungarian League MVP (2006); EuroCup scoring leader (2009); Russian SuperLeague champion (2013); First-team All-Atlantic 10 (2003); Second-team All-Atlantic 10 (2002); Third-team All-Atlantic 10 (2001); Atlantic 10 All-Rookie Team (2000)

Christopher Edward Monroe (born January 19, 1981) is an American former professional basketball player. A 6 ft 3 in (1.91 m) guard, he played college basketball for the George Washington Colonials from 1999 to 2003. Monroe finished his college career with 2,249 points, becoming George Washington's all-time leading scorer, and was inducted into the university's Athletic Hall of Fame in 2012.

During a professional career that lasted from 2003 to 2013, Monroe played in several European countries as well as Iran. His achievements included two Hungarian League championships with Atomerőmű SE, the 2006 Hungarian League MVP award, the 2008–09 EuroCup scoring title with Chorale Roanne, and the 2013 Russian SuperLeague championship with Ural Ekaterinburg.

== Early life and high school career ==
Monroe was born in Silver Spring, Maryland, to Barbara and Charles Monroe. He attended Good Counsel High School.

As a junior, Monroe averaged 17 points and 10 rebounds per game and helped Good Counsel compile a 22–8 record and win the Maryland Private School championship. He earned honorable mention All-Metro honors from The Washington Post and was a Street & Smith's honorable mention All-American.

== College career ==
Monroe played four seasons at George Washington University from 1999 to 2003. He moved into the starting lineup during his freshman season and finished the year as the team's leading rebounder with 6.8 rebounds per game. He was subsequently selected to the Atlantic 10 All-Rookie Team.

Monroe developed into one of the leading scorers in the Atlantic 10 Conference. He earned Third Team All-Atlantic 10 honors in 2001 and Second Team honors in 2002. During his junior season in 2001–02, he averaged 21.1 points and 6.1 rebounds per game.

As a senior in 2002–03, Monroe averaged 20.3 points per game and was named First Team All-Atlantic 10. On March 10, 2003, he scored 23 points against Massachusetts to pass Joe Holup and become George Washington's all-time leading scorer.

Monroe finished his four-year college career with 2,249 points in 118 games, an average of 19.1 points per game. He also recorded 712 rebounds, 254 assists, 116 steals and 39 blocks. At the time of his graduation, he held George Washington career records for points, free throws made (720) and free throws attempted (1,096). He was named his team's MVP three times and was inducted into the George Washington Athletic Hall of Fame in 2012.

== Professional career ==
=== Early career and Atomerőmű (2003–2006) ===
After completing his college career in 2003, Monroe began playing professionally. He had an early stint in Belgium with Dexia Mons-Hainaut before moving to Austria, where he signed with BK Kalendermacher Klosterneuburg. He averaged more than 22 points per game in Austria.

In 2004, Monroe also made two appearances for the Florence Flyers of the United States Basketball League, averaging 14.0 points and 3.5 rebounds per game.

Monroe then joined Hungarian club Atomerőmű SE, where he spent two seasons. He helped the club win consecutive Hungarian League championships in 2005 and 2006, as well as the Hungarian Cup in 2005, and was named the Hungarian League MVP in 2006. During the 2006 championship finals, he scored 41 points in a 98–96 road victory over Albacomp in Game 2.

=== Pavia and Napoli (2006–2008) ===
For the 2006–07 season, Monroe moved to Italy and signed with Edimes Pavia of the country's second division. He averaged 23.4 points per game over 43 appearances and finished as one of the league's leading scorers.

The following season, he joined Eldo Napoli of the Lega Basket Serie A. Monroe appeared in 31 league games and averaged 16.6 points, 4.0 rebounds and 2.9 assists per game.

=== Chorale Roanne (2008–2009) ===
In 2008, Monroe signed with French club Chorale Roanne. In the French Pro A, he averaged 15.8 points, 3.4 rebounds and 3.5 assists per game.

Monroe was particularly productive in the 2008–09 EuroCup. In five games, he averaged a competition-leading 20.6 points per game while shooting 51.4 percent from three-point range.

=== PAOK Thessaloniki (2009–2010) ===
In August 2009, Monroe signed with PAOK Thessaloniki for the 2009–10 season, joining a roster coached by Soulis Markopoulos.

Monroe became one of PAOK's main offensive players. In 25 Greek Basketball League games, he averaged 14.5 points, 4.1 rebounds, 2.5 assists and 1.0 steal in 31.3 minutes per game, while shooting 39.5 percent from three-point range.

On November 1, 2009, Monroe helped PAOK defeat city rivals Aris and was subsequently named the Greek League's MVP of the second round of the season.

PAOK finished the regular season in fifth place and qualified for the league playoffs. Monroe appeared in both playoff games, averaging 11.0 points and 6.0 rebounds per game.

=== Olimpia Milano (2010) ===
On May 12, 2010, following the conclusion of PAOK's season, Monroe signed with Armani Jeans Milano for the remainder of the 2009–10 Italian season.

He became part of Milano's rotation during the playoffs. In the deciding fifth game of the league semifinals against Caserta, Monroe made a late three-pointer as Milano won 65–59 to advance to the Italian League Finals. In Game 1 of the finals against Montepaschi Siena, he led Milano with 15 points. Milano eventually finished as league runners-up.

=== Brindisi and Zob Ahan (2010–2011) ===
On July 14, 2010, Monroe signed with Enel Brindisi.

Later in the season, he moved to Iran and joined Zob Ahan for the league playoffs. In 10 games with the club, Monroe scored 171 points and collected 57 rebounds.

=== Ukraine and return to Greece (2011–2012) ===
Monroe signed with Czech club Nymburk in August 2011, but after dealing with an injury he did not ultimately begin the season with the club.

Later in 2011, he joined Budivelnyk Kyiv in Ukraine. In December, he scored 22 points in a 104–77 victory over BC Odessa.

In late 2011, Monroe returned to Greece and signed with KAOD. He appeared in four Greek League games, averaging 8.0 points, 1.8 rebounds and 1.0 assist per game. In January 2012, he left KAOD and returned to Ukraine to join Khimik Yuzhny.

=== Ural Ekaterinburg (2012–2013) ===
For the 2012–13 season, Monroe played for Ural Ekaterinburg in Russia. He led the team in scoring during the season with 14.9 points per game and helped Ural win the Russian second-tier SuperLeague championship.

In the championship series against Universitet Yugra, Monroe averaged 17.5 points, 7.0 rebounds and 4.3 assists per game. After Ural lost the opening game, he recorded 27 points and 10 rebounds in Game 2, helping the club win the next three games and capture the title.

Monroe also appeared in two FIBA EuroChallenge qualifying games for Ural, averaging 22.0 points, 3.5 rebounds and 5.5 assists per game. Ural was the final club of his professional playing career.

== Post-playing career ==
After his playing career, Monroe returned to George Washington. He joined the university's athletic department in 2014 and later served as Associate Director of Development.
