= Mahram Tehran BC =

Mahram Tehran
- Leagues: Iranian Super League
- Founded: 1999; 27 years ago
- Arena: Azadi Basketball Hall
- Capacity: 3,000
- Location: Tehran, Iran
- Team colors: White and Red
- President: Amir Mohammad Ganji
- Championships: 2 Asian Cup; 4 West Asian Cup; 6 Iranian Championships
- Website: mahramclub.ir
Home	Away

Mahram Tehran Basketball Club is an Iranian professional basketball club based in Tehran, Iran. They compete in the Iranian Basketball Super League. Mahram is considered one of the giants of Iranian Basketball and were Champions of Asia in 2009 and 2010. Mahram has won the Iranian Basketball Super League championship a total of six times.

They are owned and sponsored by Mahram Food Company, Which is afood processing company located in Tehran.

== History ==
Mahram was founded in 1999 and is owned by the Mahram Food Company. Mahram won its first Iranian Basketball Super League championship in 2008 and won the next four editions as well, Mahram won its first Asian Champions Cup in 2009 and repeated the feat in 2010. Mahram's streak was broken in 2012 when they finished in second place in the Super League, Mahram won the Iranian Super League for the sixth time in 2015 after a two year absence. Notable national team players such as Hamed Haddadi and Mehdi Kamrani have played for Mahram over the years.

== Tournament records ==
=== Iranian Super League ===
- 2004–05: 13th place
- 2005–06: 11th place
- 2006–07: 3rd place
- 2007–08: Champions
- 2008–09: Champions
- 2009–10: Champions
- 2010–11: Champions
- 2011–12: Champions
- 2012–13: 2nd place
- 2013–14: 2nd place
- 2014–15: Champions
- 2017–18: 2nd place
- 2019–20: Cancelled
- 2020–21: 2nd place

=== WABA Champions Cup ===
- 2009: Champions
- 2010: Champions
- 2011: 3rd place
- 2012: Champions
- 2014: Champions

=== Asian Champions Cup ===
- 2009: Champions
- 2010: Champions
- 2011: 2nd place
- 2012: 2nd place

=== ABA Club Championship ===
- 2009: Champions

=== Dubai International Tournament ===
- 2007: Champions
- 2008: 5th place
- 2009: 6th place
- 2010: Champions

== Coaches ==
- (Iran) Hassan Negahdari (2004–2005)
- (Iran) Mohammad Mehdi Izadpanah (2005–2006)
- (Serbia) Radenko Orlović (2006–2007)
- (Iran) Mostafa Hashemi (2007–2010)
- (Iran) Mehran Shahintab (2010–2011)
- (Iran) Mostafa Hashemi (2011–2012)
- (Slovenia) Memi Bečirovič (2012–2013)
- (Iran) Mostafa Hashemi (2013–2015, 2017–2018, 2019-)

== Players ==
=== FIBA Hall of Famers ===
Mahram Tehran BC Hall of Famers
Players
No.	Nat.	Name	Position	Tenure	Inducted
11	(New Zealand)	Pero Cameron	PF	2005	2017

=== Notable players ===
- (Belize) Marlon Garnett
- (Bulgaria) Priest Lauderdale
- (Georgia (country)) Nikoloz Tskitishvili
- (Iran) Hamed Afagh
- (Iran) Javad Davari
- (Iran) Hamed Haddadi
- (Iran) Mehdi Kamrani
- (Iran) Samad Nikkhah Bahrami
- (Iran) Jaber Rouzbahani
- (Iran) Hamed Sohrabnejad
- (Iran) Saman Veisi
- (Jordan) Rasheim Wright
- (Latvia) Kaspars Kambala
- (Lebanon) Jackson Vroman
- (Montenegro) Nebojša Bogavac
- (Netherlands) Francisco Elson
- (New Zealand) Pero Cameron
- (Panama) Jaime Lloreda
- (Senegal) Cheikh Samb
- (Senegal) Pape Sow
- (Slovenia) Marko Milič
- (Spain) Óscar Yebra
- (United States) Marlon Garnett
- (United States) Rashard Griffith
- (United States) Art Long
- (United States) Tony Madison
- (United States) Arnett Moultrie
- (United States) Lee Nailon
- (United States) Jacob Pullen
- (United States) DaJuan Summers
- (United States) Chris Williams
- (United States) Loren Woods

== Squads ==
- 2009 FIBA Asia Champions Cup
  - Mehrad Atashi, Saman Veisi, Kaveh Nourafza, Mehdi Kamrani, Kaveh Gharieh, Aidin Kabir, Hamed Afagh, Hamed Sohrabnejad, Jackson Vroman, Houman Rezaei, Samad Nikkhah Bahrami, Priest Lauderdale. Coach: Mostafa Hashemi
- 2010 FIBA Asia Champions Cup
  - Mehrad Atashi, Jackson Vroman, Kaveh Nourafza, Mehdi Kamrani, Loren Woods, Aidin Kabir, Hamed Afagh, Hamed Sohrabnejad, Mehdi Esmaeili, Mohammad Reza Dargi, Samad Nikkhah Bahrami, Saman Veisi. Coach: Mostafa Hashemi
