= Joseph Forte =

American basketball player (born 1981)

Personal information
- Born: March 23, 1981 (age 45) Atlanta, Georgia, U.S.
- Listed height: 6 ft 4 in (1.93 m)
- Listed weight: 194 lb (88 kg)

Career information
- High school: DeMatha (Hyattsville, Maryland)
- College: North Carolina (1999–2001)
- NBA draft: 2001: 1st round, 21st overall pick
- Drafted by: Boston Celtics
- Playing career: 2001–2015
- Position: Shooting guard
- Number: 40

Career history
- 2001–2002: Boston Celtics
- 2002–2003: Seattle SuperSonics
- 2004–2005: Asheville Altitude
- 2005–2006: Apollon Patras BC
- 2006–2007: Montepaschi Siena
- 2007–2008: UNICS Kazan
- 2008: Fortitudo Bologna
- 2008–2009: Snaidero Udine
- 2010: Nuova Pallacanestro Pavia
- 2011: Pistoia Basket
- 2011: Ironi Ashkelon
- 2012: Petrochimi Bandar Imam BC
- 2014–2015: Maccabi Tel Aviv

Career highlights
- Consensus first-team All-American (2001); ACC co-Player of the Year (2001); First-team All-ACC (2001); Second-team All-ACC (2000); ACC Rookie of the Year (2000); All-ACC Freshman Team (2000); No. 40 honored by North Carolina Tar Heels; First-team Parade All-American (1999); McDonald's All-American (1999)
- Stats at NBA.com
- Stats at Basketball Reference

Joseph Xavier Forte (born March 23, 1981) is an American former professional basketball player. He played two seasons in the National Basketball Association (NBA) and was an All-American player at North Carolina.

== Beginnings ==
Forte got his start at DeMatha Catholic High School in Hyattsville, Maryland. There, Forte played under the instruction of legendary high school prep coach Morgan Wootten. Forte's teammate at DeMatha, Keith Bogans, has played for several teams in the NBA. Forte was named Washington Post All Met Basketball Player of the Year in his senior year, during which he averaged 22.1 points, 7.2 rebounds and 2.7 assists.

== Career highlights ==
After a two-year college career at University of North Carolina at Chapel Hill (highlights of which included winning the 2000 Atlantic Coast Conference Rookie of the Year as well as 2001 ACC Men's Basketball Player of the Year) that was marked by flashes of brilliant play, he was selected by the Boston Celtics with the 21st pick in the 2001 NBA draft.

Forte would only play in the NBA for 2 seasons for a total of 25 games (8 games for Boston in his rookie season, and 17 games for the Seattle SuperSonics in his sophomore season). In those 25 games, Forte averaged 1.2 points and 0.7 assists per game, struggling to convert from his natural shooting guard position to point guard. His final NBA game was played on April 16, 2003 in a 84 - 70 win over the Phoenix Suns where he recorded 2 assists and no points in 5 minutes of playing time.

After being released by the Sonics, Forte couldn't find a roster spot in the NBA and joined the Asheville Altitude of the NBA D-League. During the summer of 2005, Forte played with Team Certified of the Entertainers Basketball Classic at Rucker Park, leading the team to the playoffs. After the summer, he went to Greece to play with Apollon Patras. He then moved to the Italian club Montepaschi Siena, which won the 2007 Italian championship game.

In July 2007, he signed with the Russian team UNICS Kazan. In January 2008 he signed for Fortitudo Bologna with a franchise option for the following season. He was waived after only two games played and in December 2008 he joined Snaidero Udine, another Italian Serie A team. In May 2009 he asked to be waived for personal matters. On January 8, 2010, he joined Nuova Pallacanestro Pavia, an Italian LegaDue team (Italian second division).

Forte signed with Pistoia Basket of Italy on August 20, 2010 for the 2011 season. With Pistoia, he averaged 18.9 points and 3.6 assists per game in the regular season In an 82–81 loss to Fileni BPA Jesi on January 9, 2011, Forte amassed 34 points, the third-highest single-game total in team history. Forte left Pistoia after being a key component and frequent starter in the team's playoff run.

On October 6, 2011, Israeli side Ironi Ashkelon signed Forte to a one-week trial. However, Forte ultimately ended up signing with Iranian Basketball Super League team Petrochimi Bandar Imam BC for 2012. Through his first two games in league play, Forte averaged 9.1 points, 3.0 assists, and 2.5 rebounds per game.

== Family ==
Forte's younger brother, Jason, played college basketball for Brown University and was named Ivy League player of the year in 2004.
