= Pape Sow =

Senegalese basketball player (born 1981)

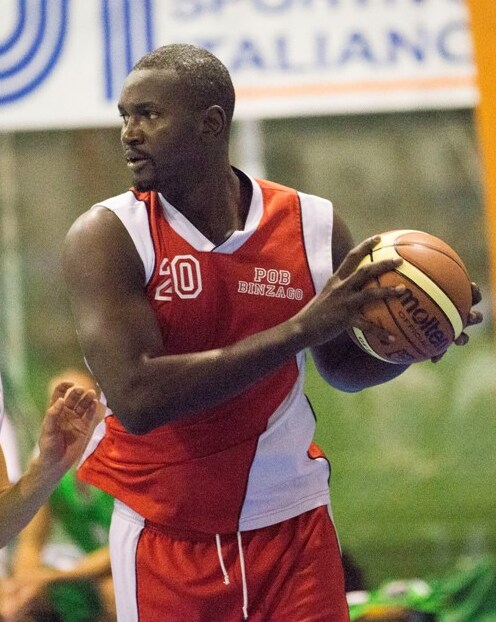
- Sow in 2014

Personal information
- Born: 22 November 1981 (age 44) Dakar, Senegal
- Listed height: 2.08 m (6 ft 10 in)
- Listed weight: 113 kg (249 lb)

Career information
- College: Chaffey (2000–2001); Cal State Fullerton (2001–2004)
- NBA draft: 2004: 2nd round, 47th overall pick
- Drafted by: Miami Heat
- Playing career: 2004–2014
- Position: Power forward
- Number: 9

Career history
- 2004–2005: Toronto Raptors
- 2005–2006: Arkansas RimRockers
- 2006–2007: Toronto Raptors
- 2007–2008: Asseco Prokom Gdynia
- 2009: Olimpia Milano
- 2009: Asseco Prokom Gdynia
- 2010: Meridiano Alicante
- 2010–2011: Caja Laboral
- 2011: Joventut Badalona
- 2011–2012: Mahram Tehran BC
- 2012–2013: Amchit Club
- 2013: Ferrol CB
- 2013: Manama
- 2014: Al Ahli Bahrein

Career highlights
- PLK Best Defender (2008); First-team All-Big West (2004); Second-team All-Big West (2002)
- Stats at NBA.com
- Stats at Basketball Reference

Pape Sow (/pɔːp/ /soʊ/ PAP so; born 22 November 1981) is a Senegalese former professional basketball player who played for the Toronto Raptors of the National Basketball Association (NBA) and for several European and Asian teams.

== College career ==
Sow is fluent in three different languages, English, French, and his native Wolof. Sow attended college at California State University, Fullerton, in California, United States. He was selected to the All-Big West Conference first-team in 2004 and second-team in 2002.

== Professional career ==
Sow was drafted by the Miami Heat in the second round, 47th selection, of the 2004 NBA draft. The draft rights to Sow were acquired by the Toronto Raptors (along with a 2005 second round pick from the Heat) for the draft rights to center Albert Miralles, the 39th overall pick.

Sow played his NBA rookie season for the Raptors and showed considerable promise with his athleticism and aggressiveness in the paint although only netting 2.3 points, 2.1 rebounds and 0.1 assists per game.

After missing the entire 2005-06 pre-season play with a groin injury and playing one game with Toronto in the regular season, he was assigned to the Arkansas RimRockers of the D-League on 20 November 2005, with whom he wowed fans by posting a 40-point, 14-rebound performance on 27 November in a 112–102 road win against the Fort Worth Flyers. In a 108–101 win against the Austin Toros on 23 December, Sow scored an outstanding double-double of 27 points and a D-League season-high 24 rebounds.

On 18 January 2006, Sow was called up to the Raptors by then-general manager Rob Babcock. Initially, head coach Sam Mitchell said in a radio interview that "I have no minutes for Pape Sow. We have no injuries. He's going to practice with us, he's going to be with the team. But I have no minutes for (Sow)." However, due to a shoulder injury to center Rafael Araujo (who also suffered from poor play prior to the injury), Sow was able to get regular playing time.

On the first day of the 2006 Summer League season, Sow broke a vertebra during practice after driving to the hoop and falling to the ground while colliding with a teammate. Sow returned to action on 22 January 2007, playing the final 3 minutes and scoring 3 points in a game against the Charlotte Bobcats.

Sow signed with Armani Jeans (Olimpia Milano) in July 2008, and later he returned to Asseco Prokom Gdynia for the 2009–10 season. He parted ways with Gdynia in December 2009.

In January 2010, Sow signed a contract with Meridiano Alicante in Spain, but the contract was terminated by mutual consent in December 2010. He then signed a temporary contract with Caja Laboral.

In 2012, he signed with Amchit of Lebanon.
