= Towzin Electric Kashan BC =

Towzin Electric Kashan
- Leagues: Super League
- Founded: 2008
- History: Towzin Electric Tehran; 2008–2009; Towzin Electric Kashan; 2009–2011
- Arena: Ketabchi Arena
- Location: Kashan, Iran
- Team colors: White and Black
- President: Mahmoud Pouyan
- Head coach: (Serbia) Vlado Đurović
- Championships: –
- Website: www.towzinbasketball.com
Home	Away

Towzin Electric Kashan is a professional Iranian basketball club based in Kashan, Iran. The team compete in the Iranian Basketball Super League.

== Roster ==
Note: Flags indicate national team eligibility at FIBA-sanctioned events. Players may hold other non-FIBA nationalities not displayed.

Number	Player	Position	Height (m)
4	(Iran) Yashar Shahmoradi	SG	1.84
5	(Bosnia and Herzegovina) Zlatko Jovanović	PG	1.81
6	(Iran) Vahid Hajian (C)	SG	1.88
7	(Iran) Houman Movahedpour	PG	1.80
8	(Iran) Saeid Davarpanah	SG	1.90
10	(Iran) Saeid Mehdiyar	PF	2.04
11	(Iran) Mohammad Hassanzadeh	PF	2.02
12	(Iran) Mohammad Jamshidi	SF	1.98
13	(Iran) Arman Zangeneh	SF	2.02
14	(Iran) Mohsen Moradkhani	C	2.13
15	(Iran) Ali Doraghi	C	2.10
16	(Serbia) Nenad Mišanović	C	2.17

Position	Name
Head Coach	(Serbia) Vlado Đurović
Assistant Coach	(Iran) Saeid Tabeshnia

== Coaches ==
- (Iran) Majid Salehi Marzijarani (2008–2010)
- (Serbia) Vlado Đurović (2010–present)

== Notable former players ==
- (Serbia) Slobodan Agoč
