= Jahesh Tarabar Qom BC =

Iranian professional basketball club

Jahesh Tarabar Qom BC is an Iranian professional basketball club. The club competes in the Iranian Super League.
