= Azad University Tehran BC =

Azad University Tehran
- Leagues: Iranian Super League
- Founded: 1991; 26 years ago
- Arena: Azadi Basketball Hall (Capacity: 3000)
- Location: Tehran, Iran
- Team colors: White and Blue
- President: Mohammad Dadkan
- Head coach: (Iran) Farzad Kouhian
- Championships: –
- Website: www.iau.ac.ir
Home	Away

Azad University Tehran Basketball Club is an Iranian professional basketball club based in Tehran, Iran. They compete in the Iranian Basketball Super League. The club is sponsored by and represents Azad University.

== History ==
Azad University Basketball Club was founded in 1991 in Tehran, Iran and represents in the Islamic Azad University in Tehran. Azad finished in fourth place in the 2011–12 season.

== Tournament records ==
=== Iranian Super League ===
- 2005–06: 13th place
- 2006–07: 11th place
- 2007–08: 11th place
- 2008–09: 9th place
- 2009–10: 5th place
- 2010–11: 5th place
- 2011–12: 4th place
- 2012–13: 6th place

== Roster ==
Number	Player	Position	Height (m)
4	(Iran) Pouya Tajik (C)	PF	2.00
5	(Iran) Reza Lotfi	SF	1.98
6	(Iran) Mohammad Reza Ebrahiminia	SF	1.98
7	(Iran) Mojtaba Bani-Aghil	SG	1.91
8	(Serbia) Saša Đorđević	PG	1.90
9	(Iran) Siavash Mohseni	SG	1.84
10	(Iran) Mohammad Reza Amel Khabbazan	PG	1.90
11	(Iran) Vahid Ameri
12	(Iran) Rouzbeh Arghavan	C	2.14
13	(Iran) Mousa Nabipour	C	2.10
14	(Iran) Navid Farahani	SF	1.94
15	(Iran) Amir Abbas Mohebbat	PF	2.00
16	(Iran) Shahabeddin Reihani	C	2.10
17	(Iran) Mohsen Ghomashchi	PF	1.98
19	(Latvia) Sandis Buškevics	PG	1.90
20	(Iran) Shahab Asghari	SG	1.94

Position	Name
Head Coach	(Iran) Mostafa Hashemi
Assistant Coach	(Iran) Mehran Atashi

== Notable former players ==
- (Iran) Amir Amini
- (Iran) Asghar Kardoust
- (Nigeria) Ejike Ugboaja
- (United States Virgin Islands) Kevin Sheppard
- page on Asia-Basket
