= Azadi Basketball Hall =

Indoor basketball arena in Tehran, Iran

Coordinates: 35°43′43″N 51°15′47″E

- Mahmoud Mashhoun Hall
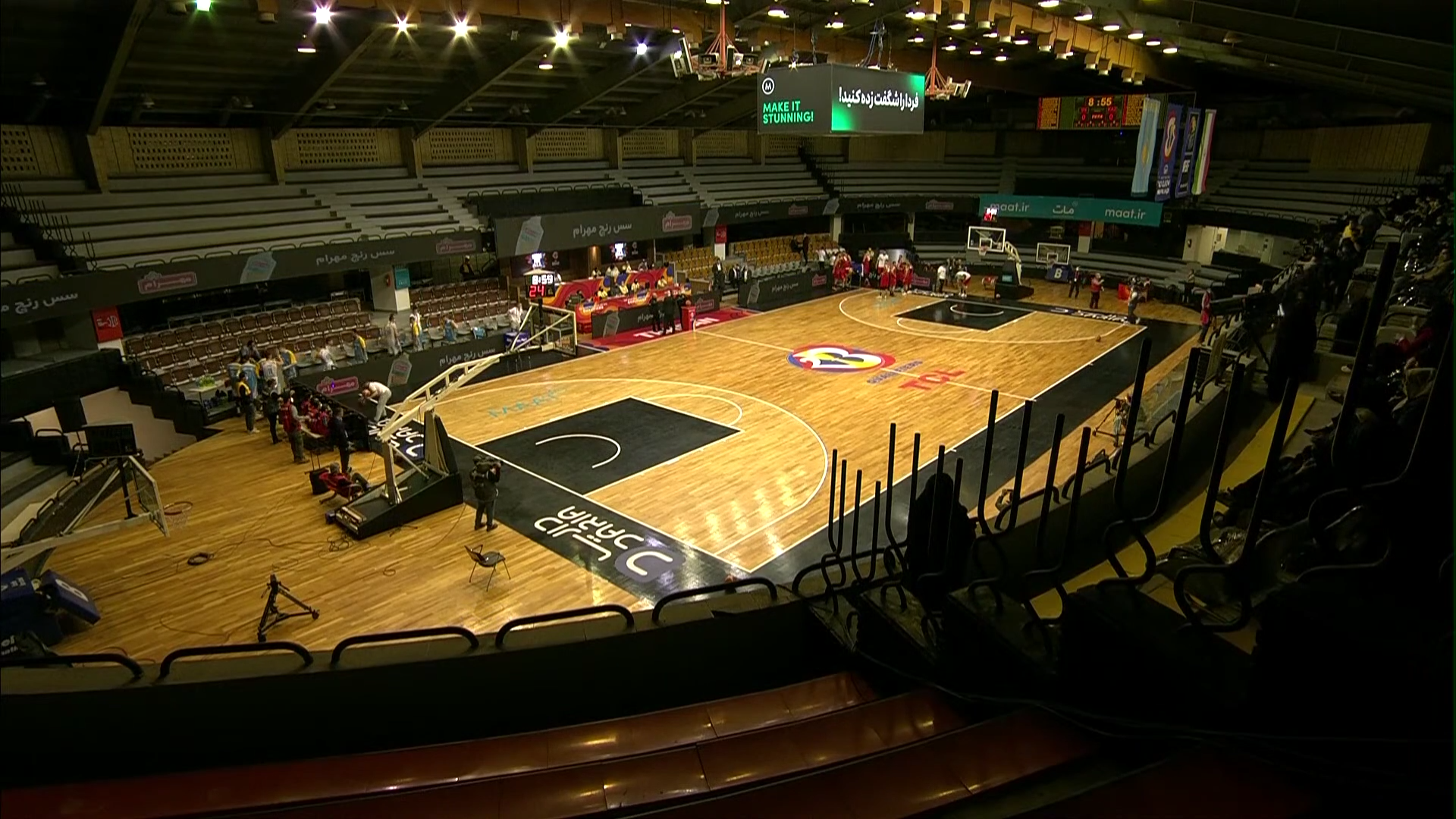
- Interior view of Azadi Basketball Hall
- Interactive map of Azadi Basketball Hall
- Full name: Azadi Basketball Hall
- Location: Tehran, Iran
- Owner: Ministry of Sports
- Operator: Tehran Municipality
- Capacity: 3,000
- Surface: 3168 m^{2}
- Field size: 72 x 44 m

Construction
- Opened: 1971
- Renovated: 2005
- Architect: Abdol-Aziz Farmanfarmaian

Tenants
- Iran national basketball team Mahram Tehran; Azad University Tehran

The Azadi Basketball Hall also known as Mahmoud Mashhoun Hall is an all-seater indoor arena located in Tehran, Iran. It is a part of 5 Halls Complex within the Azadi Sport Complex. It seats 3,000 people.

== Hosted events ==
- Basketball at the 1974 Asian Games
- Basketball at the 1997 West Asian Games
- 2002 WABA Championship
- 2003 WABA Champions Cup
- 2004 WABA Championship
- 2004 FIBA Asia Under-20 Championship
- 2007 FIBA Asia Champions Cup
- 2008 FIBA Asia Under-18 Championship
- 2010 WABA Champions Cup
- 2013 WABA Championship
- 2013 FIBA Asia Under-16 Championship
- 2014 WABA Champions Cup
- 2016 FIBA Asia Under-18 Championship
- 2016 FIBA Asia Challenge (only one matchday)
- 2022 FIBA U18 Asian Championship
