= Louleh a.s Shiraz BC =

B.A Shiraz
- Leagues: Super League
- Founded: 2005; 12 years ago
- History: Louleh Sabz a.s Shiraz; 2005–2009; Louleh a.s Bond Shiraz; 2009–2010; B.A Shiraz; 2010–2011; Louleh a.s Shiraz; 2011–2017
- Arena: Khaneh Basketball
- Location: Shiraz, Iran
- Team colors: White and Blue
- Championships: –
- Website: www.a-s-pipe.com
Home	Away

B.A logo

Louleh a.s Shiraz was a professional Iranian basketball club based in Shiraz, Iran. The team competes in the Iranian Basketball Super League.

== Notable former players ==
- (Iran) Ali Doraghi
- (Serbia) Milan Vučićević
- (Slovenia) Saša Zagorac
- (United States Virgin Islands) Kevin Sheppard

== See also ==
- The Iran Job
