= 2009–10 Iranian Basketball Super League =

Locations of the 2009–10 season teams

The following is the results of the Iran Super League 2009/10 basketball season, Persian Gulf Cup.

== Regular season ==
=== Standings ===
Rank	Team	Pld	W	L	PF	PA	PD	Pts
1	Mahram Tehran	16	16	0	1465	1194	+271	32
2	Zob Ahan Isfahan	16	13	3	1344	1216	+128	29
3	Petrochimi Bandar Imam	16	9	7	1182	1126	+56	25
4	Saba Mehr Qazvin	16	9	7	1177	1145	+32	25
5	Shahrdari Gorgan	16	7	9	1340	1309	+31	23
6	Azad University Tehran	16	6	10	1328	1391	−63	22
7	Louleh a.s Bond Shiraz	16	6	10	1275	1393	−118	22
8	Towzin Electric Kashan	16	4	12	1144	1218	−74	20
9	Heyat Basketball Shahrekord	16	2	14	1135	1398	−263	18
—	Trust Pasargad Shiraz	—	—	—	—	—	—	—

=== Results ===
	ASB	AZD	HBS	MAH	PET	SAB	GOR	TEC	PAS	ZOB
a.s Bond		94–85	91–83	64–91	80–71	83–91	85–80	72–67	99–63	85–82
Azad University	97–79		91–88	83–96	90–87	89–77	91–95	86–77	X	82–97
HB Shahrekord	95–87	73–83		75–105	46–61	53–76	108–104	63–72	84–48	72–90
Mahram	99–70	99–84	123–77		91–71	80–68	95–80	87–75	112–85	94–92
Petrochimi	88–71	77–60	81–65	67–74		78–73	73–65	92–68	98–52	80–83
Saba Mehr	92–87	88–81	71–42	66–77	63–60		83–78	62–55	X	73–87
Shahrdari Gorgan	95–83	90–75	83–62	78–98	71–73	77–64		79–62	84–55	74–77
Towzin Electric	83–67	90–73	90–76	71–75	67–69	58–71	84–96		83–42	63–75
Trust Pasargad	X	67–99	82–77	55–97	64–77	67–85	71–97	86–95		48–104
Zob Ahan	94–77	84–78	90–57	73–81	89–84	60–59	96–95	75–62	99–56	

- Trust Pasargad withdrew from the league with three games remaining. All results were declared null and void.

== Playoffs ==
=== Classification 5th–8th ===
5th–8th places
5	Shahrdari Gorgan	77	66	—
8	Towzin Electric	79	73	—
6	Azad University	83	96	—
7	a.s Bond	78	87	—

5th place
8	Towzin Electric	73	78	—
6	Azad University	89	84	—
7th place
5	Shahrdari Gorgan	81	82	—
7	a.s Bond	84	105	—

=== Championship ===
Semi-finals
1	Mahram	84	92	—
4	Saba Mehr	71	83	—
2	Zob Ahan	86	72	77
3	Petrochimi	90	64	63

Final
1	Mahram	96	93	—
2	Zob Ahan	73	75	—
3rd place
4	Saba Mehr	64	63	—
3	Petrochimi	71	93	—

== Final standings ==
Rank	Team	Qualification or relegation
1	Mahram Tehran	2011 West Asian Basketball League
2	Zob Ahan Isfahan	2011 West Asian Basketball League
3	Petrochimi Bandar Imam	
4	Saba Mehr Qazvin	
5	Azad University Tehran	
6	Towzin Electric Kashan	
7	Louleh a.s Bond Shiraz	
8	Shahrdari Gorgan	
9	Heyat Basketball Shahrekord	
—	Trust Pasargad Shiraz	Relegation to the first division
