= Melli Haffari Company Ahvaz Sports Club =

- Full name: Melli Haffari Company Ahvaz Sports Club
- Based in: Ahvaz, Iran
- Colors: Yellow and Red
- President: karimi

Melli Haffari Company Ahvaz Sports Club (Persian: باشگاه ورزشی شرکت ملی حفاری اهواز) is an Iranian multi-sports club affiliated to National Iran Drilling Company and located in Ahvaz. NBA Basketball player Hamed Haddadi and Olympic Games Weightlifting Medalists Behdad Salimi and Navvab Nasirshalal are notable athletes at the club.

== Football ==
Hafari Ahvaz Football Club is an Iranian football team based in Ahvaz who currently compete in the 2nd Division the third-tier football league in Iran.

== Basketball ==
Melli Haffari Ahvaz Basketball Club is an Iranian professional basketball club based in Ahvaz, Iran. They compete in the Iranian Basketball Super League. During the 2011 NBA lockout, then-Memphis Grizzlies center Hamed Haddadi played for Melli Haffari Ahvaz for a few games. He returned to the NBA when the lockout ended.
