= 2010 WABA Champions Cup =

The WABA Champions Cup 2010 was the 13th staging of the WABA Champions Cup, the basketball club tournament of West Asia Basketball Association. The tournament was held in Tehran, Iran. The top four teams from different countries qualify to the FIBA Asia Champions Cup 2010.

== Standings ==
Team	Pld	W	L	PF	PA	PD	Pts
(Iran) Mahram Tehran	5	5	0	536	392	+144	10
(Syria) Al-Jalaa Aleppo	5	4	1	511	499	+12	9
(Iran) Zob Ahan Isfahan	5	3	2	457	433	+24	8
(Lebanon) Al-Riyadi Beirut	5	2	3	475	464	+11	7
(Lebanon) Hoops	5	1	4	468	502	−34	6
(Iraq) Duhok	5	0	5	362	519	−157	5

== Results ==
March 8
17:00

Al-Riyadi Beirut (Lebanon)	88–94	(Iran) Mahram Tehran
Scoring by quarter: 31–20, 13–25, 20–20, 24–29

Azadi Basketball Hall, Tehran

March 8
19:00

Zob Ahan Isfahan (Iran)	92–74	(Iraq) Duhok
Scoring by quarter: 23–12, 15–25, 33–10, 21–27

Azadi Basketball Hall, Tehran

March 9
17:00

Mahram Tehran (Iran)	87–70	(Iran) Zob Ahan Isfahan
Scoring by quarter: 24–21, 22–21, 19–16, 22–12

Azadi Basketball Hall, Tehran

March 9
19:00

Al-Jalaa Aleppo (Syria)	112–107 (OT)	(Lebanon) Al-Riyadi Beirut
Scoring by quarter: 21–27, 21–21, 22–24, 31–23, Overtime: 17–12

Azadi Basketball Hall, Tehran

March 10
17:00

Hoops (Lebanon)	99–69	(Iraq) Duhok
Scoring by quarter: 30–18, 26–20, 27–17, 16–14

Azadi Basketball Hall, Tehran

March 10
19:00

Zob Ahan Isfahan (Iran)	92–99	(Syria) Al-Jalaa Aleppo
Scoring by quarter: 26–29, 30–16, 21–29, 15–25

Azadi Basketball Hall, Tehran

March 11
17:00

Mahram Tehran (Iran)	120–74	(Lebanon) Hoops
Scoring by quarter: 24–13, 24–24, 36–19, 36–18

Azadi Basketball Hall, Tehran

March 11
19:00

Al-Riyadi Beirut (Lebanon)	73–100	(Iran) Zob Ahan Isfahan
Scoring by quarter: 11–32, 14–26, 24–31, 24–11

Azadi Basketball Hall, Tehran

March 12
17:00

Duhok (Iraq)	81–110	(Iran) Mahram Tehran
Scoring by quarter: 10–31, 17–25, 25–28, 29–26

Azadi Basketball Hall, Tehran

March 12
19:00

Hoops (Lebanon)	110–117 (OT)	(Syria) Al-Jalaa Aleppo
Scoring by quarter: 14–30, 31–21, 22–21, 31–26, Overtime: 12–19

Azadi Basketball Hall, Tehran

March 13
17:00

Al-Riyadi Beirut (Lebanon)	93–85	(Lebanon) Hoops
Scoring by quarter: 22–22, 22–17, 22–18, 27–28

Azadi Basketball Hall, Tehran

March 13
19:00

Al-Jalaa Aleppo (Syria)	104–65	(Iraq) Duhok
Scoring by quarter: 17–20, 28–24, 30–7, 29–14

Azadi Basketball Hall, Tehran

March 14
9:30

Hoops (Lebanon)	100–103 (OT)	(Iran) Zob Ahan Isfahan
Scoring by quarter: 20–21, 21–22, 19–18, 29–28, Overtime: 11–14

Azadi Basketball Hall, Tehran

March 14
15:00

Duhok (Iraq)	73–114	(Lebanon) Al-Riyadi Beirut
Scoring by quarter: 10–29, 18–32, 26–30, 19–23

Azadi Basketball Hall, Tehran

March 14
17:00

Mahram Tehran (Iran)	125–79	(Syria) Al-Jalaa Aleppo
Scoring by quarter: 32–20, 28–20, 36–22, 29–17

Azadi Basketball Hall, Tehran
