= 2010 FIBA Asia Champions Cup =

21st Asia Champions Cup
- Official logo of the tournament

Tournament details
- Host country: Qatar
- Dates: May 22–30
- Teams: 10
- Venue(s): 1 (in 1 host city)

Final positions
- Champions: Iran (Mahram Tehran's 2nd title; Iran's 4th title)

Tournament statistics
- Games played: 33

The FIBA Asia Champions Cup 2010 was the 21st staging of the FIBA Asia Champions Cup, the basketball club tournament of FIBA Asia. The tournament was held in Doha, Qatar in the hall of Al-Rayyan Sports Club Gharafa between May 22, 2010, and May 30, involving 10 teams and distributed to two groups as follows:

== Qualification ==
Host team
Defending champion

Participating teams for the tournament
West Asia (4)	Gulf (4)	Central Asia (1)	Southeast Asia (1)	East Asia
(Lebanon) Al-Riyadi Beirut	(Qatar) Al-Rayyan	(Kazakhstan) Astana Tigers	(Philippines) Smart Gilas	No team participated
(Jordan) ASU	(Iran) Mahram Tehran			No team participated
(Syria) Al-Jalaa Aleppo	(Saudi Arabia) Al-Hilal			No team participated
(Iraq) Duhok	(United Arab Emirates) Al-Nasr			No team participated

== Preliminary round ==
=== Group A ===
Pos	Team	Pld	W	L	PF	PA	PD	Pts	Qualification
1	(Qatar) Al-Rayyan	4	4	0	338	261	+77	8	Advanced to the quarterfinals
2	(Iran) Mahram Tehran	4	3	1	344	267	+77	7	Advanced to the quarterfinals
3	(Kazakhstan) Astana Tigers	4	2	2	266	302	−36	6	Advanced to the quarterfinals
4	(Philippines) Smart Gilas	4	1	3	277	323	−46	5	Advanced to the quarterfinals
5	(Iraq) Duhok (E)	4	0	4	276	348	−72	4	Elimination

Source: Unknown
(E) Eliminated

All times are local (UTC+3).

May 22
14:00

Astana Tigers (Kazakhstan)	49–77	(Iran) Mahram
Scoring by quarter: 8–19, 16–16, 7–26, 18–16

Al-Gharafa Indoor Stadium, Doha

May 22
18:00

Al-Rayyan (Qatar)	88–66	(Iraq) Duhok
Scoring by quarter: 21–16, 19–15, 25–21, 23–14

Al-Gharafa Indoor Stadium, Doha

May 23
16:00

Duhok (Iraq)	68–75	(Kazakhstan) Astana Tigers
Scoring by quarter: 10–19, 18–21, 25–25, 15–10

Al-Gharafa Indoor Stadium, Doha

May 23
18:00

Smart Gilas (Philippines)	58–86	(Qatar) Al-Rayyan
Scoring by quarter: 24–23, 17–13, 10–23, 7–27

Al-Gharafa Indoor Stadium, Doha

May 24
14:00

Mahram (Iran)	109–68	(Iraq) Duhok
Scoring by quarter: 24–21, 38–14, 29–13, 18–20

Al-Gharafa Indoor Stadium, Doha

May 24
20:00

Astana Tigers (Kazakhstan)	77–71 (OT)	(Philippines) Smart Gilas
Scoring by quarter: 20–14, 16–16, 15–14, 10–17, Overtime: 16–10

Al-Gharafa Indoor Stadium, Doha

May 25
18:00

Al-Rayyan (Qatar)	86–65	(Kazakhstan) Astana Tigers
Scoring by quarter: 28–17, 21–13, 22–17, 15–18

Al-Gharafa Indoor Stadium, Doha

May 25
20:00

Smart Gilas (Philippines)	72–86	(Iran) Mahram
Scoring by quarter: 16–23, 17–15, 20–23, 19–25

Al-Gharafa Indoor Stadium, Doha

May 26
18:00

Mahram (Iran)	72–78	(Qatar) Al-Rayyan
Scoring by quarter: 14–18, 14–15, 28–21, 16–24

Al-Gharafa Indoor Stadium, Doha

May 26
20:00

Duhok (Iraq)	74–76	(Philippines) Smart Gilas
Scoring by quarter: 22–18, 12–18, 19–16, 21–24

Al-Gharafa Indoor Stadium, Doha

=== Group B ===
Team	Pld	W	L	PF	PA	PD	Pts
(Lebanon) Al-Riyadi Beirut	4	4	0	335	309	+26	8
(Jordan) ASU	4	3	1	336	274	+62	7
(Syria) Al-Jalaa Aleppo	4	2	2	329	313	+16	6
(Saudi Arabia) Al-Hilal	4	1	3	280	341	−28	5
(United Arab Emirates) Al-Nasr	4	0	4	311	354	−43	4

All times are local (UTC+3).

May 22
18:00

Al-Jalaa Aleppo (Syria)	77–87	(Lebanon) Al-Riyadi
Scoring by quarter: 19–17, 19–19, 14–26, 25–25

Al-Gharafa Indoor Stadium, Doha

May 22
20:00

Al-Nasr (United Arab Emirates)	69–77	(Saudi Arabia) Al-Hilal
Scoring by quarter: 17–17, 18–30, 26–14, 8–16

Al-Gharafa Indoor Stadium, Doha

May 23
14:00

ASU (Jordan)	90–74	(United Arab Emirates) Al-Nasr
Scoring by quarter: 30–13, 22–14, 12–16, 26–31

Al-Gharafa Indoor Stadium, Doha

May 23
20:00

Al-Hilal (Saudi Arabia)	63–93	(Syria) Al-Jalaa Aleppo
Scoring by quarter: 19–29, 8–26, 25–11, 11–27

Al-Gharafa Indoor Stadium, Doha

May 24
16:00

Al-Riyadi (Lebanon)	83–77	(Saudi Arabia) Al-Hilal
Scoring by quarter: 25–23, 24–13, 23–14, 11–27

Al-Gharafa Indoor Stadium, Doha

May 24
18:00

Al-Jalaa Aleppo (Syria)	64–78	(Jordan) ASU
Scoring by quarter: 8–13, 12–19, 24–21, 20–25

Al-Gharafa Indoor Stadium, Doha

May 25
14:00

Al-Nasr (United Arab Emirates)	85–95	(Syria) Al-Jalaa Aleppo
Scoring by quarter: 20–24, 22–20, 16–20, 27–31

Al-Gharafa Indoor Stadium, Doha

May 25
16:00

ASU (Jordan)	72–73	(Lebanon) Al-Riyadi
Scoring by quarter: 12–18, 23–23, 15–20, 22–12

Al-Gharafa Indoor Stadium, Doha

May 26
14:00

Al-Hilal (Saudi Arabia)	63–96	(Jordan) ASU
Scoring by quarter: 21–27, 22–26, 14–17, 6–26

Al-Gharafa Indoor Stadium, Doha

May 26
16:00

Al-Riyadi (Lebanon)	92–83	(United Arab Emirates) Al-Nasr
Scoring by quarter: 22–23, 22–17, 26–26, 22–17

Al-Gharafa Indoor Stadium, Doha

== Knockout round ==
=== Championship ===
Fifth place
A3	(Kazakhstan) Astana Tigers	73
B3	(Syria) Al-Jalaa Aleppo	65
Seventh place
B4	(Saudi Arabia) Al-Hilal	95
A4	(Philippines) Smart Gilas	100

5th–8th place semifinals
B4	(Saudi Arabia) Al-Hilal	50
A3	(Kazakhstan) Astana Tigers	64
A4	(Philippines) Smart Gilas	81
B3	(Syria) Al-Jalaa Aleppo	83

Quarterfinals
A1	(Qatar) Al-Rayyan	97
B4	(Saudi Arabia) Al-Hilal	59
A3	(Kazakhstan) Astana Tigers	59
B2	(Jordan) ASU	74
B1	(Lebanon) Al-Riyadi Beirut	74
A4	(Philippines) Smart Gilas	63
A2	(Iran) Mahram Tehran	88
B3	(Syria) Al-Jalaa Aleppo	60

Semifinals
A1	(Qatar) Al-Rayyan	82
B2	(Jordan) ASU	62
B1	(Lebanon) Al-Riyadi Beirut	64
A2	(Iran) Mahram Tehran	71

Final
A1	(Qatar) Al-Rayyan	73
A2	(Iran) Mahram Tehran	93
Third place
B2	(Jordan) ASU	78
B1	(Lebanon) Al-Riyadi Beirut (OT)	82

=== Quarter-finals ===
All times are local (UTC+3).

May 28
14:00

ASU (Jordan)	74–59	(Kazakhstan) Astana Tigers
Scoring by quarter: 13–15, 17–12, 24–13, 20–19

Al-Gharafa Indoor Stadium, Doha

May 28
16:00

Mahram Tehran (Iran)	88–60	(Syria) Al-Jalaa Aleppo
Scoring by quarter: 23–21, 21–13, 24–14, 20–12

Al-Gharafa Indoor Stadium, Doha

May 28
18:00

Al-Rayyan (Qatar)	97–59	(Saudi Arabia) Al-Hilal
Scoring by quarter: 29–14, 17–19, 32–13, 19–13

Al-Gharafa Indoor Stadium, Doha

May 28
20:00

Al-Riyadi Beirut (Lebanon)	74–63	(Philippines) Smart Gilas
Scoring by quarter: 9–10, 25–24, 22–13, 18–16

Al-Gharafa Indoor Stadium, Doha

=== Semi-finals ===
All times are local (UTC+3).

May 29
14:00

5th–8th

Al-Hilal (Saudi Arabia)	50–64	(Kazakhstan) Astana Tigers
Scoring by quarter: 16–22, 15–16, 9–10, 10–16

Al-Gharafa Indoor Stadium, Doha

May 29
16:00

5th–8th

Smart Gilas (Philippines)	81–83	(Syria) Al-Jalaa Aleppo
Scoring by quarter: 21–14, 21–17, 17–26, 22–26

Al-Gharafa Indoor Stadium, Doha

May 29
18:00

Semis

Al-Rayyan (Qatar)	82–62	(Jordan) ASU
Scoring by quarter: 18–16, 18–14, 21–9, 25–23

Al-Gharafa Indoor Stadium, Doha

May 29
20:00

Semis

Al-Riyadi Beirut (Lebanon)	64–71	(Iran) Mahram Tehran
Scoring by quarter: 13–17, 8–15, 13–21, 30–18

Al-Gharafa Indoor Stadium, Doha

=== Finals ===
All times are local (UTC+3).

May 28
22:00

9th–10th

Duhok (Iraq)	77–85	(United Arab Emirates) Al-Nasr
Scoring by quarter: 24–21, 9–25, 17–20, 27–19

Al-Gharafa Indoor Stadium, Doha

May 30
14:00

7th–8th

Al-Hilal (Saudi Arabia)	95–100 (OT)	(Philippines) Smart Gilas
Scoring by quarter: 20–14, 27–27, 19–24, 20–21, Overtime: 12–14

Al-Gharafa Indoor Stadium, Doha

May 30
16:00

5th–6th

Astana Tigers (Kazakhstan)	73–65	(Syria) Al-Jalaa Aleppo
Scoring by quarter: 18–21, 17–15, 20–17, 18–12

Al-Gharafa Indoor Stadium, Doha

May 30
18:00

Bronze

ASU (Jordan)	78–82 (OT)	(Lebanon) Al-Riyadi Beirut
Scoring by quarter: 6–19, 25–14, 20–21, 18–15, Overtime: 9–13

Al-Gharafa Indoor Stadium, Doha

May 30
20:00

Gold

Al-Rayyan (Qatar)	73–93	(Iran) Mahram Tehran
Scoring by quarter: 20–22, 13–24, 16–30, 24–17

Al-Gharafa Indoor Stadium, Doha

== Final standings ==
Rank	Team	Record
Gold medal	(Iran) Mahram Tehran	6–1
Silver medal	(Qatar) Al-Rayyan	6–1
Bronze medal	(Lebanon) Al-Riyadi Beirut	6–1
4th	(Jordan) ASU	4–3
5th	(Kazakhstan) Astana Tigers	4–2
6th	(Syria) Al-Jalaa Aleppo	3–3
7th	(Philippines) Smart Gilas	2–5
8th	(Saudi Arabia) Al-Hilal	1–6
9th	(United Arab Emirates) Al-Nasr	1–4
10th	(Iraq) Dohuk	0–5
