= 2020–21 Iranian Basketball Super League =

Locations of the 2020–21 season teams

The 2020–21 Iran Super League season was the 31st season of the Iranian basketball league.

== Regular season ==
=== Group A ===
Pos	Team	Pld	W	L	PF	PA	PD	Pts	Qualification
1	Shahrdari Gorgan	14	14	0	1214	935	+279	28	Qualification to playoffs
2	Palayesh Naft Abadan	14	10	4	1058	906	+152	24	Qualification to playoffs
3	Exxon Tehran	14	9	5	957	963	−6	23	Qualification to playoffs
4	Avijeh Sanat Parsa Mashhad	14	8	6	1045	980	+65	22	Qualification to playoffs
5	Sanat Mes Rafsanjan	14	6	8	1001	961	+40	20	Qualification to playoffs
6	Shora & Shahrdari Qazvin	14	6	8	1047	1087	−40	20	Qualification to playoffs
7	Khaneh Basketball Khuzestan	14	2	12	910	1151	−241	16	Qualification to playoffs
8	Raad Padafand Mashhad	14	1	13	939	1188	−249	15	Qualification to playoffs

Source: IRIBF

Home \ Away	AVI	EXX	KBK	NAF	RAD	SMR	SHG	SSQ
Avijeh Sanat Parsa Mashhad	—	76–66	85–67	68–67	94–60	73–66	74–97	73–76
Exxon Tehran	62–58	—	74–66	75–72	75–61	69–75	44–64	90–88
Khaneh Basketball Khuzestan	50–89	69–83	—	63–75	66–88	45–89	68–98	89–87
Palayesh Naft Abadan	71–59	77–53	64–54	—	97–71	66–48	67–89	82–70
Raad Padafand Mashhad	78–95	58–61	68–88	61–98	—	68–79	61–79	68–81
Sanat Mes Rafsanjan	66–70	64–79	80–65	58–65	85–58	—	60–78	79–81
Shahrdari Gorgan	86–79	74–54	79–55	87–78	102–68	88–78	—	98–87
Shora & Shahrdari Qazvin	68–52	61–72	92–65	50–79	88–71	56–74	62–95	—

Source: IRIBF
Legend: Blue = home team win; Red = away team win.
Matches with lighter background shading were decided after overtime.

=== Group B ===
Pos	Team	Pld	W	L	PF	PA	PD	Pts	Qualification
1	Mahram Tehran	14	13	1	1211	816	+395	27	Qualification to playoffs
2	Chemidor Qom	14	12	2	1269	1039	+230	26	Qualification to playoffs
3	Zob Ahan Isfahan	14	10	4	1123	904	+219	24	Qualification to playoffs
4	Sanat Mes Kerman	14	7	7	981	1021	−40	21	Qualification to playoffs
5	Koochin Amol	14	7	7	1063	989	+74	21	Qualification to playoffs
6	Shahrdari Bandar Abbas	14	5	9	1018	1102	−84	19	Qualification to playoffs
7	Niroo Zamini Tehran	14	2	12	861	1205	−344	16	Qualification to playoffs
8	Ayandehsazan Tehran	14	0	14	824	1274	−450	14	Qualification to playoffs

Source: IRIBF

Home \ Away	AYA	CHE	KCH	MAH	NIR	SMK	SHB	ZOB
Ayandehsazan Tehran	—	62–107	69–110	52–112	69–70	51–65	57–72	55–89
Chemidor Qom	108–71	—	89–98	66–82	109–69	88–75	76–68	84–78
Koochin Amol	85–48	58–70	—	41–78	87–48	69–85	100–91	55–63
Mahram Tehran	109–40	87–89	76–72	—	86–44	86–45	77–56	84–80
Niroo Zamini Tehran	68–65	66–107	58–82	47–90	—	56–82	66–88	65–81
Sanat Mes Kerman	96–70	69–88	61–68	55–87	93–71	—	70–51	46–75
Shahrdari Bandar Abbas	89–63	67–96	74–65	65–87	92–87	80–82	—	72–101
Zob Ahan Isfahan	94–52	89–92	79–73	64–70	74–46	81–57	75–53	—

Source: IRIBF
Legend: Blue = home team win; Red = away team win.
Matches with lighter background shading were decided after overtime.

== Playoffs ==
1/8 finals
A1	Shahrdari Gorgan	2
B8	Ayandehsazan Tehran	0
B4	Sanat Mes Kerman	0
A5	Sanat Mes Rafsanjan	2
B2	Chemidor Qom	2
A7	Khaneh Basketball Khuzestan	0
A3	Exxon Tehran	2
B6	Shahrdari Bandar Abbas	1
B1	Mahram Tehran	2
A8	Raad Padafand Mashhad	0
A4	Avijeh Sanat Parsa Mashhad	1
B5	Koochin Amol	2
A2	Palayesh Naft Abadan	2
B7	Niroo Zamini Tehran	0
B3	Zob Ahan Isfahan	2
A6	Shora & Shahrdari Qazvin	1

Quarterfinals
A1	Shahrdari Gorgan	2
A5	Sanat Mes Rafsanjan	0
B2	Chemidor Qom	2
A3	Exxon Tehran	1
B1	Mahram Tehran	2
B5	Koochin Amol	0
A2	Palayesh Naft Abadan	2
B3	Zob Ahan Isfahan	1

Semifinals
A1	Shahrdari Gorgan	3
B2	Chemidor Qom	0
B1	Mahram Tehran	3
A2	Palayesh Naft Abadan	2

Final
A1	Shahrdari Gorgan	3
B1	Mahram Tehran	1
Third place
B2	Chemidor Qom (OT)	90
A2	Palayesh Naft Abadan	85

=== 1/8 finals ===
Team 1	Series	Team 2	Game 1	Game 2	Game 3
Shahrdari Gorgan	2–0	Ayandehsazan Tehran	112–55	90–64	
Sanat Mes Kerman	0–2	Sanat Mes Rafsanjan	64–71	72–89	
Chemidor Qom	2–0	Khaneh Basketball Khuzestan	109–66	117–59	
Exxon Tehran	2–1	Shahrdari Bandar Abbas	79–68	81–88	93–89
Mahram Tehran	2–0	Raad Padafand Mashhad	88–56	83–64	
Avijeh Sanat Parsa Mashhad	1–2	Koochin Amol	66–94	83–75	66–74
Palayesh Naft Abadan	2–0	Niroo Zamini Tehran	87–48	81–60	
Zob Ahan Isfahan	2–1	Shora & Shahrdari Qazvin	74–80 (OT)	81–72	98–86

=== Quarterfinals ===
Team 1	Series	Team 2	Game 1	Game 2	Game 3
Shahrdari Gorgan	2–0	Sanat Mes Rafsanjan	104–61	81–74	
Chemidor Qom	2–1	Exxon Tehran	62–65	87–77	83–54
Mahram Tehran	2–0	Koochin Amol	82–59	92–62	
Palayesh Naft Abadan	2–1	Zob Ahan Isfahan	68–59	70–77	68–60

=== Semifinals ===
Team 1	Series	Team 2	Game 1	Game 2	Game 3	Game 4	Game 5
Shahrdari Gorgan	3–0	Chemidor Qom	91–65	95–91	83–76		
Mahram Tehran	3–2	Palayesh Naft Abadan	89–72	59–69	70–74	90–86 (OT)	85–83

=== Final ===
Team 1	Series	Team 2	Game 1	Game 2	Game 3	Game 4	Game 5
Shahrdari Gorgan	3–1	Mahram Tehran	84–72	78–101	88–66	110–103 (OT)	

18 April 2021
21:30

Report

Shahrdari Gorgan	84–72	Mahram Tehran
Scoring by quarter: 25–14, 14–16, 24–21, 21–21
Pts: Petty 24; Rebs: Aminu 11; Asts: Jamshidi 8		Pts: Nikkhah 30; Rebs: Zangeneh, Summers 8 Asts: Kamrani, Nikkhah 5

Azadi Basketball Hall, Tehran

20 April 2021
20:15

Report

Mahram Tehran	101–78	Shahrdari Gorgan
Scoring by quarter: 35–20, 25–16, 16–21, 25–21
Pts: Nikkhah 21; Rebs: Summers 11; Asts: Kamrani 5		Pts: Petty 16; Rebs: Kolasangiani 7 Asts: Jamshidi 3

Azadi Basketball Hall, Tehran

22 April 2021
20:15

Report

Shahrdari Gorgan	88–66	Mahram Tehran
Scoring by quarter: 21–18, 18–8, 22–24, 27–16
Pts: Aminu 20; Rebs: Aminu 14; Asts: Jamshidi 8		Pts: Nikkhah 22; Rebs: Khandanpour, Summers 6 Asts: Hosseinzadeh 3

Azadi Basketball Hall, Tehran

24 April 2021
20:30

Report

Mahram Tehran	103–110 (OT)	Shahrdari Gorgan
Scoring by quarter: 20–19, 27–35, 33–21, 16–21, Overtime: 7–14
Pts: Summers 27; Rebs: Nikkhah 6 Asts: Trent 7		Pts: Petty 36; Rebs: Aminu 20; Asts: Jamshidi 5

Azadi Basketball Hall, Tehran

== Statistical leaders ==
Category	Player	Team	Average
Points	(Iran) Mohammad Jamshidi	Shahrdari Gorgan	21.0
Rebounds	(Iran) Arsalan Kazemi	Chemidor Qom	12.8
Assists	(Iran) Mohammad Jamshidi	Shahrdari Gorgan	6.1
Blocks	(Germany) Waverly Austin	Shora & Shahrdari Qazvin	2.2
Steals	(Serbia) Aleksandar Ponjavić	Avijeh Sanat Parsa Mashhad	2.6

== Imports ==
The following is the list of imports, which had played for their respective teams at least once, with the returning imports in italics.

Team	Player 1	Player 2	Replaced
Avijeh Sanat Parsa Mashhad	(Serbia) Nikola Maravić	(Serbia) Aleksandar Ponjavić	—
Ayandehsazan Tehran	—	—	—
Chemidor Qom	(Nigeria) Ike Diogu	(Bulgaria) E. J. Rowland	(United States) Kelvin Amayo (Serbia) Nikola Popović
Exxon Tehran	(Croatia) Zoran Vrkić	(United States) Corin Henry	—
Khaneh Basketball Khuzestan	(United States) Reger Dowell	(United States) Chris Ware	—
Koochin Amol	—	—	—
Mahram Tehran	(United States) Malique Trent	(United States) DaJuan Summers	—
Niroo Zamini Tehran	—	—	—
Palayesh Naft Abadan	—	—	—
Raad Padafand Mashhad	—	—	—
Sanat Mes Kerman	(British Virgin Islands) Norville Carey	(United States) Devin Martin	—
Sanat Mes Rafsanjan	(South Sudan) Emmanuel Malou	—	—
Shahrdari Bandar Abbas	(United States) Oumar Barry	(United States) Darryl Bryant	—
Shahrdari Gorgan	(United States) Perry Petty	(Nigeria) Alade Aminu	—
Shora & Shahrdari Qazvin	(Germany) Waverly Austin	(United States) Malcolm Grant	—
Zob Ahan Isfahan	(Serbia) Sava Lešić	(United States) Justin Dentmon	(United States) Devin Sweetney
