= 2023–24 Iranian Basketball Super League =

Locations of the 2023–24 season teams

The 2023–24 Iran Super League season was the 34th season of the Iranian basketball league. Shahrdari Gorgan was the defending champion.

== Regular season ==
Pos	Team	Pld	W	L	PF	PA	PD	Pts	Qualification
1	Shahrdari Gorgan	22	20	2	2028	1630	+398	42	Qualification to playoffs
2	Zob Ahan Isfahan	22	16	6	1729	1620	+109	38	Qualification to playoffs
3	Tabiat Eslamshahr	22	15	7	1791	1634	+157	37	Qualification to playoffs
4	Mahram Tehran	22	15	7	1908	1815	+93	37	Qualification to playoffs
5	Sanat Mes Kerman	22	13	9	1703	1678	+25	35	Qualification to playoffs
6	Palayesh Naft Abadan	22	13	9	1755	1752	+3	35	Qualification to playoffs
7	Kalleh Mazandaran	22	12	10	1909	1761	+148	34	Qualification to playoffs
8	Limondis Shiraz	22	8	14	1848	1891	−43	30	Qualification to playoffs
9	Averta Sari	22	8	14	1732	1834	−102	30	Relegation playoffs
10	Sanat Mes Rafsanjan	22	6	16	1680	1832	−152	28	Relegation playoffs
11	Foolad Hormozgan	22	5	17	1702	1849	−147	27	Relegation playoffs
12	Raad Padafand Tehran	22	1	21	1523	2012	−489	23	Relegation playoffs

Source: Varzesh3

== Playoffs ==
Quarterfinals
1	Shahrdari Gorgan	3
8	Limondis Shiraz	0
4	Mahram Tehran	3
5	Sanat Mes Kerman	1
2	Zob Ahan Isfahan	3
7	Kalleh Mazandaran	1
3	Tabiat Eslamshahr	3
6	Palayesh Naft Abadan	2

Semifinals
1	Shahrdari Gorgan	3
4	Mahram Tehran	0
2	Zob Ahan Isfahan	1
3	Tabiat Eslamshahr	3

Final
1	Shahrdari Gorgan	2
3	Tabiat Eslamshahr	3

=== Relegation ===
The higher-seeded team played the first and third leg (if necessary) at home.

Team 1	Series	Team 2	Game 1	Game 2	Game 3
Averta Sari	2–0	Raad Padafand Tehran	94–77	64–57	
Sanat Mes Rafsanjan	0–2	Foolad Hormozgan	69–78	66–105	

=== Quarterfinals ===
The higher-seeded team played the first, second and fifth leg (if necessary) at home.

Team 1	Series	Team 2	Game 1	Game 2	Game 3	Game 4	Game 5
Shahrdari Gorgan	3–0	Limondis Shiraz	102–71	89–77	88–73		
Mahram Tehran	3–1	Sanat Mes Kerman	88–71	100–95 (OT)	79–92	80–74	
Zob Ahan Isfahan	3–1	Kalleh Mazandaran	90–82	80–57	80–105	100–85	
Tabiat Eslamshahr	3–2	Palayesh Naft Abadan	88–94	101–87	82–85	91–83	81–75

=== Semifinals ===
The higher-seeded team played the first, second and fifth leg (if necessary) at home.

Team 1	Series	Team 2	Game 1	Game 2	Game 3	Game 4	Game 5
Shahrdari Gorgan	3–0	Mahram Tehran	84–59	76–70	89–84		
Zob Ahan Isfahan	1–3	Tabiat Eslamshahr	74–84	68–64	68–74	83–90	

=== Final ===
The higher-seeded team played the first, second and fifth leg (if necessary) at home.

Team 1	Series	Team 2	Game 1	Game 2	Game 3	Game 4	Game 5
Shahrdari Gorgan	2–3	Tabiat Eslamshahr	79–86	105–82	99–95	82–86	94–99 (OT)

17 May 2024
16:00

Report

Shahrdari Gorgan	79–86	Tabiat Eslamshahr
Scoring by quarter: 15–28, 30–15, 14–19, 20–24
Pts: Cherry 23; Rebs: Kazemi 7 Asts: Vahedi, Rezaeifar, Cherry 3		Pts: Stevens 31; Rebs: Dragović 10; Asts: Dragović 5

Imam Khomeini Hall, Gorgan

19 May 2024
16:00

Report

Shahrdari Gorgan	105–82	Tabiat Eslamshahr
Scoring by quarter: 17–25, 25–19, 27–22, 36–16
Pts: Vahedi 25; Rebs: Kazemi 9 Asts: Vahedi 6		Pts: Stevens 27; Rebs: Davarpanah, Stevens 3 Asts: Shahrian, Dragović 6

Imam Khomeini Hall, Gorgan

5 June 2024
16:00

Report

Tabiat Eslamshahr	95–99	Shahrdari Gorgan
Scoring by quarter: 25–25, 22–23, 27–21, 21–30
Pts: Stevens 39; Rebs: Davarpanah, Dragović 5 Asts: Stevens 10		Pts: Vahedi 33; Rebs: Kazemi 17; Asts: Kazemi 8

Azadi Basketball Hall, Tehran

7 June 2024
16:00

Report

Tabiat Eslamshahr	86–82	Shahrdari Gorgan
Scoring by quarter: 30–24, 19–27, 20–20, 17–11
Pts: Stevens 41; Rebs: Zangeneh 13; Asts: Stevens 6		Pts: Vahedi 18; Rebs: Monji 14; Asts: Kazemi 6

Azadi Basketball Hall, Tehran

19 May 2024
16:00

Report

Shahrdari Gorgan	94–99 (OT)	Tabiat Eslamshahr
Scoring by quarter: 22–27, 20–24, 24–17, 14–12, Overtime: 14–19
Pts: Vahedi 22; Rebs: Kazemi 9 Asts: Kazemi 5		Pts: Stevens 44; Rebs: Davarpanah 9 Asts: Stevens 6

Imam Khomeini Hall, Gorgan
