= 2022–23 Iranian Basketball Super League =

Locations of the 2022–23 season teams

The 2022–23 Iran Super League season was the 33rd season of the Iranian basketball league. Shahrdari Gorgan won the title after beating Kalleh Mazandaran in the final.

== Regular season ==
Pos	Team	Pld	W	L	PF	PA	PD	Pts	Qualification
1	Shahrdari Gorgan	22	20	2	1793	1476	+317	42	Group A
2	Zob Ahan Isfahan	22	16	6	1739	1563	+176	38	Group A
3	Kalleh Mazandaran	22	15	7	1857	1646	+211	37	Group A
4	Palayesh Naft Abadan	22	14	8	1749	1631	+118	36	Group A
5	Mahram Tehran	22	14	8	1735	1602	+133	36	Group B
6	Avijeh Sanat Parsa Mashhad	22	12	10	1547	1545	+2	34	Group B
7	Sanat Mes Kerman	22	11	11	1526	1571	−45	33	Group B
8	Nobough Arak	22	10	12	1506	1546	−40	32	Group B
9	Sanaye Foolad Hormozgan	22	9	13	1460	1569	−109	30	Group C
10	Sanat Mes Rafsanjan	22	6	16	1392	1523	−131	27	Group C
11	Raad Padafand Tehran	22	3	19	1529	1861	−332	25	Group C
12	Toufargan Azarshahr	22	2	20	1336	1636	−300	22	Group C

Source: Varzesh3

Home \ Away	AVI	KAL	MAH	NOB	NAF	RAD	SMK	SMR	SAN	SHG	TUF	ZOB
Avijeh Sanat Parsa Mashhad	—	73–82	65–64	70–68	70–74	90–55	57–63	81–59	71–63	82–95	58–57	87–84
Kalleh Mazandaran	80–64	—	84–73	88–77	84–78	106–77	92–76	76–78	103–63	83–88	94–56	84–78
Mahram Tehran	92–69	74–70	—	79–63	83–72	92–65	91–98	79–81	20–0	88–92	74–68	69–68
Nobough Arak	52–54	60–69	83–98	—	77–76	86–69	64–52	73–65	73–65	61–86	74–66	62–64
Palayesh Naft Abadan	67–72	94–91	79–64	70–63	—	91–53	89–81	84–78	79–70	78–91	99–80	88–89
Raad Padafand Tehran	70–76	75–82	72–95	68–79	65–77	—	72–76	64–74	61–70	66–86	85–80	88–99
Sanat Mes Kerman	72–75	65–64	90–89	60–69	61–71	90–71	—	51–50	80–74	43–64	84–56	51–63
Sanat Mes Rafsanjan	70–61	59–73	55–70	57–62	62–74	68–78	60–68	—	74–62	73–91	74–62	61–68
Sanaye Foolad Hormozgan	79–72	92–86	87–96	65–57	82–81	75–56	85–66	71–63	—	66–86	81–85	72–85
Shahrdari Gorgan	71–66	111–103	82–98	93–58	88–83	102–71	94–77	20–0	85–56	—	20–0	88–83
Toufargan Azarshahr	64–81	63–88	72–80	53–71	67–82	72–75	50–63	70–67	0–20	65–87	—	86–99
Zob Ahan Isfahan	64–53	72–75	87–67	79–74	60–63	95–73	71–59	85–64	90–62	76–73	80–64	—

Source: Varzesh3
Legend: Blue = home team win; Red = away team win.
Matches with lighter background shading were decided after overtime.

== Second round ==
=== Group A ===
Home \ Away	KAL	NAF	SHG	ZOB
Kalleh Mazandaran	—	79–75	94–104	100–83
Palayesh Naft Abadan	85–88	—	79–85	83–75
Shahrdari Gorgan	94–72	76–71	—	82–80
Zob Ahan Isfahan	77–75	83–77	0–20	—

Source: Varzesh3
Legend: Blue = home team win; Red = away team win.
Matches with lighter background shading were decided after overtime.

=== Group B ===
Home \ Away	AVI	MAH	NOB	SMK
Avijeh Sanat Parsa Mashhad	—	81–86	87–89	82–88
Mahram Tehran	74–83	—	65–64	95–70
Nobough Arak	64–60	89–85	—	61–56
Sanat Mes Kerman	77–72	80–75	89–56	—

Source: Varzesh3
Legend: Blue = home team win; Red = away team win.
Matches with lighter background shading were decided after overtime.

=== Group C ===
Home \ Away	RAD	SAN	SMR	TUF
Raad Padafand Tehran	—	72–84	91–96	20–0
Sanaye Foolad Hormozgan	20–0	—	58–57	94–72
Sanat Mes Rafsanjan	91–56	92–77	—	20–0
Toufargan Azarshahr	0–20	0–20	0–20	—

Source: Varzesh3
Legend: Blue = home team win; Red = away team win.
Matches with lighter background shading were decided after overtime.

=== Standings ===
Pos	Team	Pld	W	L	PF	PA	PD	Pts	Qualification
1	Shahrdari Gorgan	28	26	2	2254	1872	+382	54	Qualification to playoffs
2	Kalleh Mazandaran	28	18	10	2365	2164	+201	46	Qualification to playoffs
3	Zob Ahan Isfahan	28	18	10	2137	2000	+137	45	Qualification to playoffs
4	Palayesh Naft Abadan	28	15	13	2219	2117	+102	43	Qualification to playoffs
5	Mahram Tehran	28	17	11	2215	2069	+146	45	Qualification to playoffs
6	Sanat Mes Kerman	28	15	13	1986	2012	−26	43	Qualification to playoffs
7	Nobough Arak	28	14	14	1929	1988	−59	42	Qualification to playoffs
8	Avijeh Sanat Parsa Mashhad	28	13	15	2012	2023	−11	41	Qualification to playoffs
9	Sanaye Foolad Hormozgan	28	14	14	1813	1862	−49	41	Relegation playoffs
10	Sanat Mes Rafsanjan	28	11	17	1768	1805	−37	38	Relegation playoffs
11	Raad Padafand Tehran	28	5	23	1788	2152	−364	32	Relegation playoffs
—	Toufargan Azarshahr	28	2	26	1408	1830	−422	23	Withdrew

Source: Varzesh3

== Playoffs ==
Quarterfinals
1	Shahrdari Gorgan	3
8	Avijeh Sanat Parsa Mashhad	0
4	Palayesh Naft Abadan	3
5	Mahram Tehran	2
2	Kalleh Mazandaran	3
7	Nobough Arak	1
3	Zob Ahan Isfahan	3
6	Sanat Mes Kerman	0

Semifinals
1	Shahrdari Gorgan	2
4	Palayesh Naft Abadan	1
2	Kalleh Mazandaran	2
3	Zob Ahan Isfahan	1

Final
1	Shahrdari Gorgan	2
2	Kalleh Mazandaran	0

=== Relegation ===
The higher-seeded team played the first, second and fifth leg (if necessary) at home.

Team 1	Series	Team 2	Game 1	Game 2	Game 3	Game 4	Game 5
Sanaye Foolad Hormozgan		Bye					
Sanat Mes Rafsanjan	3–0	Raad Padafand Tehran	76–71	69–58	68–66 (OT)		

=== Quarterfinals ===
The higher-seeded team played the first, second and fifth leg (if necessary) at home.

Team 1	Series	Team 2	Game 1	Game 2	Game 3	Game 4	Game 5
Shahrdari Gorgan	3–0	Avijeh Sanat Parsa Mashhad	91–81	75–70	93–81		
Palayesh Naft Abadan	3–2	Mahram Tehran	100–92	89–99	72–71	78–82	88–87 (OT)
Kalleh Mazandaran	3–1	Nobough Arak	86–67	102–95	70–74	74–62	
Zob Ahan Isfahan	3–0	Sanat Mes Kerman	84–77	92–84 (OT)	90–75		

=== Semifinals ===
The higher-seeded team played the first and third leg (if necessary) at home.

Team 1	Series	Team 2	Game 1	Game 2	Game 3
Shahrdari Gorgan	2–1	Palayesh Naft Abadan	93–81	92–95	79–67
Kalleh Mazandaran	2–1	Zob Ahan Isfahan	66–71	82–73	93–89 (OT)

=== Final ===
The higher-seeded team played the first and third leg (if necessary) at home.

Team 1	Series	Team 2	Game 1	Game 2	Game 3
Shahrdari Gorgan	2–0	Kalleh Mazandaran	73–58	81–79	

22 May 2023
16:10

Report

Shahrdari Gorgan	73–58	Kalleh Mazandaran
Scoring by quarter: 17–14, 16–12, 23–19, 17–13
Pts: Yakhchali, Jamshidi 18; Rebs: Yakhchali, Jamshidi, Petty 6 Asts: Yakhchali, Petty 4		Pts: Aghajanpour 23; Rebs: Mirzaei 14; Asts: Rembert 6

Imam Khomeini Hall, Gorgan

25 May 2023
16:00

Report

Kalleh Mazandaran	79–81	Shahrdari Gorgan
Scoring by quarter: 22–19, 21–26, 12–20, 24–16
Pts: Mirzaei 17; Rebs: N. Yazarloo 10; Asts: Rembert 8		Pts: Petty 35; Rebs: Yakhchali, Petty 8 Asts: Yakhchali 8

Payambar Azam Arena, Amol
