= 2025–26 Iranian Basketball Super League =

35th season of the Iranian Basketball Super League

- League: Iranian Basketball Super League
- Sport: Basketball
- Duration: 2 October 2025 – present
- Teams: 12
- TV partner(s): IRIB Varzesh, IRIB TV3

Regular season

Second stage

Playoffs

Finals

IBSL seasons
- ← 2024–25 2026–27 →

The 2025–26 Iran Super League season was the 35th season of the Iranian basketball league. The season began on 2 October 2025. A total of 12 teams are competing in the league, with Esteghlal Tehran making its debut in the competition.

== Background ==
The Iranian Basketball Super League (IBSL) is the highest tier of professional club basketball in Iran. It has been organized by the Iran Basketball Federation since 1991.

The league consists of 12 teams competing in a two-phase format. During the regular season, each team plays every other team in a double round-robin format. The top teams then advance to the playoffs, where the league champion is determined.

Throughout the league's history, clubs such as Mahram Tehran, Zob Ahan Isfahan, Petrochimi Bandar Imam, and Shahrdari Gorgan have been among the most successful teams. Mahram dominated the league during the late 2000s, while Petrochimi Bandar Imam enjoyed considerable success throughout the 2010s. Since the early 2020s, Shahrdari Gorgan has established itself as the league's dominant club, winning multiple consecutive championships.

The league champion qualifies for the premier Asian club competition, including the Basketball Champions League Asia.

== Regular season ==
=== Standings ===
| Pos | Team | Pld | W | L | PF | PA | PD | Pts | Qualification |
|---|---|---|---|---|---|---|---|---|---|
| 1 | Shahrdari Gorgan | 19 | 16 | 3 | 1552 | 1287 | +265 | 35 | Qualification to playoffs |
| 2 | Esteghlal Tehran | 19 | 16 | 3 | 1555 | 1333 | +222 | 35 | Qualification to playoffs |
| 3 | Kalleh Mazandaran | 19 | 16 | 3 | 1609 | 1367 | +242 | 35 | Qualification to playoffs |
| 4 | Tabiat | 19 | 13 | 6 | 1544 | 1416 | +128 | 32 | Qualification to playoffs |
| 5 | Palayesh Naft Abadan | 19 | 12 | 7 | 1647 | 1441 | +206 | 31 | Qualification to playoffs |
| 6 | Naft va Gaz Zagros Jonoubi | 19 | 9 | 10 | 1577 | 1567 | +10 | 28 | Qualification to playoffs |
| 7 | Golnoor Isfahan | 19 | 8 | 11 | 1334 | 1390 | −56 | 27 | Qualification to playoffs |
| 8 | Pas Kurdistan | 20 | 5 | 15 | 1305 | 1662 | −357 | 25 | Qualification to playoffs |
| 9 | Raad Padafand Isfahan | 19 | 4 | 15 | 1385 | 1562 | −177 | 23 | |
| 10 | Mahgol Alborz | 19 | 4 | 15 | 1450 | 1633 | −183 | 23 | |
| 11 | Petro Novin Mahshahr | 19 | 2 | 17 | 1166 | 1466 | −300 | 21 | |

Updated to match(es) played on 5 February 2026. Source: لیگ برتر بسکتبال ایران – Varzesh3

== WASL qualification ==
| Pos | Team | Pld | W | L | PF | PA | PD | Pts | Qualification |
|---|---|---|---|---|---|---|---|---|---|
| 1 | Esteghlal Tehran | 4 | 4 | 0 | 290 | 240 | +50 | 8 | Qualified for the West Asia Super League |
| 2 | Palayesh Naft Abadan | 4 | 2 | 2 | 333 | 344 | −11 | 6 | Qualified for the West Asia Super League |
| 3 | Naft va Gaz Zagros Jonoubi | 4 | 0 | 4 | 261 | 300 | −39 | 4 | |

== Changes ==
The 2025–26 season began with 12 participating clubs. The most notable change was the debut of Esteghlal Tehran, which entered the league for the first time after assembling a squad featuring several members of the Iran national basketball team.

Several clubs, including Shahrdari Gorgan, Naft Abadan, Kalleh Mazandaran, and Tabiat, strengthened their rosters by signing multiple foreign players. Esteghlal Tehran also entered the season with a squad featuring several Iranian national team players.

=== Coaching changes ===
Several clubs appointed new head coaches ahead of the season. Esteghlal Tehran entered the league under a new coaching staff, while Tabiat also made changes to its coaching personnel before the start of the campaign.

The League Organization also announced that only clubs that had settled all outstanding financial obligations would be eligible to participate in the 2025–26 season.

=== Team changes ===
The season featured two notable changes in league membership. Zob Ahan Isfahan did not participate in the competition, while Esteghlal Tehran joined the league as a new entrant.
