= 2024–25 Iranian Basketball Super League =

Locations of the 2024–25 season teams

The 2024–25 Iran Super League season was the 35th season of the Iranian basketball league. Tabiat Eslamshahr was the defending champion.

== Regular season ==
=== Standings ===
Pos	Team	Pld	W	L	PF	PA	PD	Pts	Qualification
1	Kalleh Mazandaran	20	17	3	1789	1548	+241	37	Qualification to playoffs
2	Tabiat Eslamshahr	20	16	4	1778	1506	+272	36	Qualification to playoffs
3	Palayesh Naft Abadan	20	15	5	1618	1446	+172	35	Qualification to playoffs
4	Shahrdari Gorgan	20	13	7	1637	1427	+210	33	Qualification to playoffs
5	Golnoor Isfahan	20	11	9	1531	1524	+7	31	Qualification to playoffs
6	Mahgol Alborz	20	11	9	1693	1609	+84	31	Qualification to playoffs
7	Payesh Part Shahroud	20	10	10	1501	1599	−98	30	Qualification to playoffs
8	Zob Ahan Isfahan	20	7	13	1401	1513	−112	27	Qualification to playoffs
9	Petro Novin Mahshahr	20	4	16	1463	1693	−230	24	
10	Aseman Velayat Mashhad	20	3	17	1464	1793	−329	23	
11	Ayandehsazan Tehran	20	3	17	1419	1636	−217	23	
—	Foolad Hormozgan	0	0	0	0	0	0	0	Withdrew

Source: Varzesh3

=== Results ===
Home \ Away	AVM	AYA	FLD	GOL	KAL	MAH	NAF	PPS	PET	SHG	TAB	ZOB
Aseman Velayat Mashhad	—	78–72	X	77–85	78–112	70–69	65–88	76–81	110–105	78–107	85–122	75–77
Ayandehsazan Tehran	71–69	—	X	77–82	70–87	66–77	71–93	65–77	87–80	68–77	77–81	76–83
Foolad Hormozgan	93–73	72–75	—	82–80	X	113–115	X	89–64	X	90–93	X	X
Golnoor Isfahan	82–71	95–70	X	—	77–85	73–68	65–79	73–81	82–61	66–80	76–68	85–52
Kalleh Mazandaran	98–67	102–89	102–98	102–88	—	92–87	62–47	100–84	96–74	76–73	103–76	66–55
Mahgol Alborz	99–69	107–104	X	75–81	85–89	—	103–76	81–67	88–61	85–77	80–88	76–68
Palayesh Naft Abadan	79–68	71–48	107–87	97–63	74–82	80–78	—	90–74	100–61	79–70	77–89	88–55
Payesh Part Shahroud	92–83	55–58	X	62–77	87–84	87–78	89–92	—	97–96	62–73	51–84	68–62
Petro Novin Mahshahr	76–70	73–59	105–103	68–74	72–99	82–86	89–93	66–76	—	82–74	66–87	87–81
Shahrdari Gorgan	99–47	76–58	X	79–68	88–82	92–71	80–82	85–70	84–49	—	77–81	101–75
Tabiat Eslamshahr	96–61	102–73	92–88	92–84	107–89	104–112	66–64	102–61	82–50	92–80	—	84–56
Zob Ahan Isfahan	83–67	71–60	86–84	80–55	70–83	83–88	68–69	74–80	68–65	56–65	84–75	—

Source: Varzesh3
Legend: Blue = home team win; Red = away team win.
Matches with lighter background shading were decided after overtime.

== Playoffs ==
Quarterfinals
1	Kalleh Mazandaran	3
8	Zob Ahan Isfahan	0
4	Shahrdari Gorgan	3
5	Golnoor Isfahan	0
2	Tabiat Eslamshahr	3
7	Payesh Part Shahroud	0
3	Palayesh Naft Abadan	3
6	Mahgol Alborz	1

Semifinals
1	Kalleh Mazandaran	1
4	Shahrdari Gorgan	3
2	Tabiat Eslamshahr	3
3	Palayesh Naft Abadan	1

Final
4	Shahrdari Gorgan	3
2	Tabiat Eslamshahr	0

=== Quarterfinals ===
The higher-seeded team played the first, second and fifth leg (if necessary) at home.

Team 1	Series	Team 2	Game 1	Game 2	Game 3	Game 4	Game 5
Kalleh Mazandaran	3–0	Zob Ahan Isfahan	97–67	85–67	78–75		
Shahrdari Gorgan	3–0	Golnoor Isfahan	76–66	78–65	73–65		
Tabiat Eslamshahr	3–0	Payesh Part Shahroud	89–70	97–74	101–70		
Palayesh Naft Abadan	3–1	Mahgol Alborz	78–69	88–97	95–83	100–92	

=== Semifinals ===
The higher-seeded team played the first, second and fifth leg (if necessary) at home.

Team 1	Series	Team 2	Game 1	Game 2	Game 3	Game 4	Game 5
Kalleh Mazandaran	1–3	Shahrdari Gorgan	82–76	68–122	83–89	86–95	
Tabiat Eslamshahr	3–1	Palayesh Naft Abadan	79–73	80–78	72–80	89–82	

=== Final ===
The higher-seeded team played the first, second and fifth leg (if necessary) at home.

Team 1	Series	Team 2	Game 1	Game 2	Game 3	Game 4	Game 5
Tabiat Eslamshahr	0–3	Shahrdari Gorgan	78–81	73–100	95–98 (2OT)		

30 April 2025
16:00

Report

Tabiat Eslamshahr	78–81	Shahrdari Gorgan
Scoring by quarter: 29–23, 18–19, 17–28, 14–11
Pts: Buva 21; Rebs: Buva 14; Asts: Mozaffari 6		Pts: Cosey 24; Rebs: Kazemi 17; Asts: Cosey 8

Azadi Basketball Hall, Tehran

2 May 2025
16:00

Report

Tabiat Eslamshahr	73–100	Shahrdari Gorgan
Scoring by quarter: 20–27, 19–23, 23–26, 11–24
Pts: Buva 25; Rebs: Buva 8 Asts: Vahedi 4		Pts: A. Yazarloo 22; Rebs: Kazemi 8 Asts: Cosey 11

Azadi Basketball Hall, Tehran

5 May 2024
18:00

Report

Shahrdari Gorgan	98–95 (2OT)	Tabiat Eslamshahr
Scoring by quarter: 23–20, 14–21, 17–19, 22–16, Overtime: 9–9, 13–10
Pts: Cosey 26; Rebs: Kazemi 24; Asts: Cosey 10		Pts: Vahedi 36; Rebs: Zangeneh 15; Asts: Vahedi 6

Imam Khomeini Hall, Gorgan
