= 2018–19 Iranian Basketball Super League =

Locations of the 2018–19 season teams

The 2018–19 Iran Super League season was the 29th season of the Iranian basketball league.

Shahrdari Tabriz was the defending champion, but the club withdrew before the start of the season.

== Regular season ==
=== Standings ===
Pos	Team	Pld	W	L	PF	PA	PD	Pts	Qualification
1	Petrochimi Bandar Imam	16	15	1	1388	971	+417	31	Qualification to playoffs
2	Chemidor Tehran	16	14	2	1209	1000	+209	30	Qualification to playoffs
3	Shahrdari Gorgan	16	11	5	1147	1101	+46	27	Qualification to playoffs
4	Palayesh Naft Abadan	16	11	5	1171	1047	+124	27	Qualification to playoffs
5	Zob Ahan Isfahan	16	8	8	1077	1075	+2	24	Qualification to playoffs
6	Avijeh Sanat Parsa Mashhad	16	4	12	1157	1254	−97	20	Qualification to playoffs
7	Pegah Tehran	16	4	12	1124	1257	−133	20	Qualification to playoffs
8	Niroo Zamini Tehran	16	4	12	1012	1231	−219	20	Qualification to playoffs
9	Raad Padafand Dezful	16	1	15	921	1270	−349	17	

Source: IRIBF

=== Results ===
Home \ Away	AVI	CHE	NIR	NAF	PEG	PET	RAD	SHG	ZOB
Avijeh Sanat Parsa Mashhad	—	57–79	79–69	63–70	81–70	63–77	74–44	62–64	59–71
Chemidor Tehran	82–76	—	76–61	65–61	74–71	82–67	87–70	81–62	69–54
Niroo Zamini Tehran	79–70	53–91	—	61–74	55–76	46–82	77–73	60–81	80–76
Palayesh Naft Abadan	80–61	52–57	81–64	—	80–76	90–97	75–49	89–79	63–55
Pegah Tehran	108–105	60–94	63–77	72–74	—	66–90	78–67	66–68	63–77
Petrochimi Bandar Imam	98–53	88–85	112–51	68–62	95–49	—	92–47	101–50	81–76
Raad Padafand Dezful	85–91	51–75	60–57	49–91	63–67	42–97	—	65–92	46–73
Shahrdari Gorgan	89–78	69–58	68–61	76–58	77–66	52–62	77–64	—	74–56
Zob Ahan Isfahan	89–85	48–54	69–61	55–71	80–73	57–81	67–46	74–69	—

Source: IRIBF
Legend: Blue = home team win; Red = away team win.
Matches with lighter background shading were decided after overtime.

== Playoffs ==
Quarterfinals
1	Petrochimi Bandar Imam	2
8	Niroo Zamini Tehran	0
4	Palayesh Naft Abadan	2
5	Zob Ahan Isfahan	0
2	Chemidor Tehran	2
7	Pegah Tehran	0
3	Shahrdari Gorgan	2
6	Avijeh Sanat Parsa Mashhad	0

Semifinals
1	Petrochimi Bandar Imam	1
4	Palayesh Naft Abadan	3
2	Chemidor Tehran	1
3	Shahrdari Gorgan	3

Final
4	Palayesh Naft Abadan	3
3	Shahrdari Gorgan	1
Third place
1	Petrochimi Bandar Imam	—
2	Chemidor Tehran	—

- Petrochimi Bandar Imam and Chemidor Tehran decided to share the third place and cancel the third place series.

=== Quarterfinals ===
The higher-seeded team played the second and third leg (if necessary) at home.

Team 1	Series	Team 2	Game 1	Game 2	Game 3
Petrochimi Bandar Imam	2–0	Niroo Zamini Tehran	103–49	114–61	
Palayesh Naft Abadan	2–0	Zob Ahan Isfahan	69–65	75–42	
Chemidor Tehran	2–0	Pegah Tehran	77–50	84–70	
Shahrdari Gorgan	2–0	Avijeh Sanat Parsa Mashhad	86–77	97–59	

=== Semifinals ===
The higher-seeded team played the first, second and fifth leg (if necessary) at home.

Team 1	Series	Team 2	Game 1	Game 2	Game 3	Game 4	Game 5
Petrochimi Bandar Imam	1–3	Palayesh Naft Abadan	75–73	58–68	70–79	65–74	
Chemidor Tehran	1–3	Shahrdari Gorgan	73–74	92–68	64–81	60–74	

=== Final ===
The higher-seeded team played the first, second and fifth leg (if necessary) at home.

Team 1	Series	Team 2	Game 1	Game 2	Game 3	Game 4	Game 5
Shahrdari Gorgan	1–3	Palayesh Naft Abadan	63–67	81–79	74–99	55–58	

26 April 2019
16:00

Report

Shahrdari Gorgan	63–67	Palayesh Naft Abadan
Scoring by quarter: 16–21, 15–14, 16–22, 16–10
Pts: Sedighi 19; Rebs: Sohrabnejad, Petty 7 Asts: Petty, Nezafat 7		Pts: Davoudi 15; Rebs: Rostampour 8 Asts: Davarpanah 11

Imam Khomeini Hall, Gorgan

27 April 2019
16:00

Report

Shahrdari Gorgan	81–79	Palayesh Naft Abadan
Scoring by quarter: 23–14, 25–20, 11–14, 22–31
Pts: Petty 21; Rebs: Sohrabnejad 8 Asts: Nezafat 6		Pts: Davarpanah 25; Rebs: Hassanzadeh 10; Asts: Davoudi 11

Imam Khomeini Hall, Gorgan

1 May 2019
16:00

Report

Palayesh Naft Abadan	99–74	Shahrdari Gorgan
Scoring by quarter: 30–16, 23–18, 19–17, 27–23
Pts: Rostampour 19; Rebs: Hassanzadeh 10; Asts: Mozaffari 9		Pts: Petty 17; Rebs: four players 3 Asts: Petty, Nezafat 3

17th Shahrivar Arena, Abadan

2 May 2019
16:00

Report

Palayesh Naft Abadan	58–55	Shahrdari Gorgan
Scoring by quarter: 11–14, 13–10, 17–12, 17–19
Pts: Davarpanah 14; Rebs: Hassanzadeh 10; Asts: Mozaffari 5		Pts: Petty 15; Rebs: Dragović 11; Asts: Dragović, Petty 5

17th Shahrivar Arena, Abadan
