= 2016–17 Iranian Basketball Super League =

Locations of the 2016–17 season teams

The 2016–17 Iran Super League season was the 27th season of the Iranian basketball league.

== Regular season ==
=== Standings ===
Pos	Team	Pld	W	L	PF	PA	PD	Pts
1	Petrochimi Bandar Imam	18	16	2	1503	1228	+275	34
2	Palayesh Naft Abadan	18	15	3	1454	1279	+175	33
3	Azad University Tehran	18	12	6	1338	1181	+157	30
4	Shahrdari Arak	18	11	7	1360	1281	+79	29
5	Chemidor Tehran	18	10	8	1368	1360	+8	28
6	Shahrdari Tabriz	18	9	9	1347	1261	+86	27
7	Shahrdari Kashan	18	7	11	1344	1452	−108	25
8	Niroo Zamini Tehran	18	6	12	1233	1339	−106	24
9	Shahrdari Gorgan	18	4	14	1185	1387	−202	22
10	Louleh a.s Shiraz	18	0	18	1122	1486	−364	17

Source: IRIBF

=== Results ===
Home \ Away	AZD	CHE	LAS	NIR	NAF	PET	SHA	SHG	SHK	SHT
Azad University Tehran	—	89–71	92–57	62–68	65–68	69–77	82–62	101–57	81–74	85–62
Chemidor Tehran	68–70	—	93–63	73–71	70–76	82–85	85–79	77–75	77–81	58–90
Louleh a.s Shiraz	71–74	69–76	—	78–102	75–89	59–91	65–89	72–79	77–87	69–78
Niroo Zamini Tehran	58–79	57–73	74–69	—	55–79	78–94	75–87	75–62	84–59	64–80
Palayesh Naft Abadan	75–60	93–82	88–67	80–53	—	78–65	86–80	68–66	82–84	71–76
Petrochimi Bandar Imam	73–66	94–75	96–48	87–70	82–87	—	74–66	84–55	91–59	74–61
Shahrdari Arak	78–67	74–77	20–0	72–61	86–70	69–76	—	88–74	79–98	81–76
Shahrdari Gorgan	45–68	59–87	84–60	53–54	49–84	81–85	67–80	—	77–70	60–67
Shahrdari Kashan	55–65	72–79	79–77	85–74	82–91	62–82	77–91	72–86	—	64–79
Shahrdari Tabriz	62–63	63–65	95–46	67–60	82–89	63–93	71–79	95–56	80–84	—

Source: IRIBF
Legend: Blue = home team win; Red = away team win.

== Second round ==
=== Group A ===
Pos	Team	Pld	W	L	PF	PA	PD	Pts	Qualification
1	Petrochimi Bandar Imam	26	23	3	2221	1778	+443	49	Qualification to playoffs
2	Azad University Tehran	26	17	9	1933	1722	+211	43	Qualification to playoffs
3	Chemidor Tehran	26	14	12	1979	1986	−7	40	Qualification to playoffs
4	Shahrdari Kashan	26	10	16	1846	2048	−202	36	Qualification to playoffs
5	Shahrdari Gorgan	26	5	21	1697	2012	−315	31	

Source: IRIBF

Home \ Away	AZD	CHE	PET	SHG	SHK
Azad University Tehran	—	80–73	70–67	75–76	83–49
Chemidor Tehran	69–76	—	86–89	81–71	77–72
Petrochimi Bandar Imam	80–64	112–81	—	98–68	97–66
Shahrdari Gorgan	61–83	74–76	47–83	—	51–55
Shahrdari Kashan	66–64	52–68	68–92	74–64	—

Source: IRIBF
Legend: Blue = home team win; Red = away team win.

=== Group B ===
Pos	Team	Pld	W	L	PF	PA	PD	Pts	Qualification
1	Palayesh Naft Abadan	24	20	4	1995	1740	+255	44	Qualification to playoffs
2	Shahrdari Arak	24	14	10	1786	1714	+72	38	Qualification to playoffs
3	Shahrdari Tabriz	24	12	12	1820	1747	+73	36	Qualification to playoffs
4	Niroo Zamini Tehran	24	7	17	1602	1768	−166	31	Qualification to playoffs
—	Louleh a.s Shiraz	0	0	0	0	0	0	0	Withdrew

Source: IRIBF

Home \ Away	LAS	NIR	NAF	SHA	SHT
Louleh a.s Shiraz	—	0–20	X	X	66–81
Niroo Zamini Tehran	X	—	57–64	60–57	57–74
Palayesh Naft Abadan	100–80	87–79	—	113–71	106–77
Shahrdari Arak	X	80–52	69–61	—	58–67
Shahrdari Tabriz	X	67–64	108–110	80–91	—

Source: IRIBF
Legend: Blue = home team win; Red = away team win.

== Playoffs ==
Quarterfinals
A1	Petrochimi Bandar Imam	3
B4	Niroo Zamini Tehran	0
B2	Shahrdari Arak	3
A3	Chemidor Tehran	2
B1	Palayesh Naft Abadan	3
A4	Shahrdari Kashan	0
A2	Azad University Tehran	3
B3	Shahrdari Tabriz	1

Semifinals
A1	Petrochimi Bandar Imam	3
B2	Shahrdari Arak	0
B1	Palayesh Naft Abadan	3
A2	Azad University Tehran	2

Final
A1	Petrochimi Bandar Imam	3
B1	Palayesh Naft Abadan	0
Third place
B2	Shahrdari Arak	1
A2	Azad University Tehran	3

=== Quarterfinals ===
The higher-seeded team played the first, second and fifth leg (if necessary) at home.

Team 1	Series	Team 2	Game 1	Game 2	Game 3	Game 4	Game 5
Petrochimi Bandar Imam	3–0	Niroo Zamini Tehran	86–70	79–70	83–73		
Shahrdari Arak	3–2	Chemidor Tehran	79–69	98–62	87–91	83–87	75–60
Palayesh Naft Abadan	3–0	Shahrdari Kashan	66–60	78–64	71–66		
Azad University Tehran	3–1	Shahrdari Tabriz	90–74	89–81	91–95	89–77	

=== Semifinals ===
The higher-seeded team played the first, second and fifth leg (if necessary) at home.

Team 1	Series	Team 2	Game 1	Game 2	Game 3	Game 4	Game 5
Petrochimi Bandar Imam	3–0	Shahrdari Arak	91–58	90–70	79–67		
Palayesh Naft Abadan	3–2	Azad University Tehran	80–74	88–86	89–98	74–85	85–66

=== Third place ===
The higher-seeded team played the first, second and fifth leg (if necessary) at home.

Team 1	Series	Team 2	Game 1	Game 2	Game 3	Game 4	Game 5
Azad University Tehran	3–1	Shahrdari Arak	95–94	97–93	64–73	81–74	

=== Final ===
The higher-seeded team played the first, second and fifth leg (if necessary) at home.

Team 1	Series	Team 2	Game 1	Game 2	Game 3	Game 4	Game 5
Petrochimi Bandar Imam	3–0	Palayesh Naft Abadan	80–74	84–62	87–73		

21 May 2017

Petrochimi Bandar Imam	80–74	Palayesh Naft Abadan
Scoring by quarter: 18–21, 23–17, 22–18, 17–18
Pts: Haddadi 24; Rebs: Haddadi 18; Asts: Yakhchali, Haddadi 3		Pts: Davarpanah 25; Rebs: Mirzaei 6 Asts: Perkins 6

Besat Andisheh Arena, Mahshahr

22 May 2017

Petrochimi Bandar Imam	84–62	Palayesh Naft Abadan
Scoring by quarter: 19–15, 15–21, 31–9, 19–17
Pts: Haddadi 17; Rebs: Haddadi 15; Asts: White 3		Pts: Davarpanah 22; Rebs: Mashayekhi, Mirzaei, Richards 5 Asts: Richards 5

Besat Andisheh Arena, Mahshahr

25 May 2017

Palayesh Naft Abadan	73–87	Petrochimi Bandar Imam
Scoring by quarter: 16–30, 25–23, 13–13, 19–21
Pts: Davarpanah 26; Rebs: Mirzaei 13; Asts: Perkins 7		Pts: Haddadi 28; Rebs: Haddadi 13; Asts: White 7

17th Shahrivar Arena, Abadan
