= 2017–18 Iranian Basketball Super League =

Locations of the 2017–18 season teams

The 2017–18 Iran Super League season was the 28th season of the Iranian basketball league.

== Regular season ==
=== Standings ===
Pos	Team	Pld	W	L	PF	PA	PD	Pts	Qualification
1	Petrochimi Bandar Imam	16	15	1	1408	1077	+331	31	Qualification to playoffs
2	Shahrdari Tabriz	16	12	4	1335	1057	+278	28	Qualification to playoffs
3	Palayesh Naft Abadan	16	11	5	1293	1155	+138	27	Qualification to playoffs
4	Mahram Tehran	16	11	5	1252	1096	+156	27	Qualification to playoffs
5	Azad University Tehran	16	7	9	1071	1101	−30	23	Qualification to playoffs
6	Niroo Zamini Tehran	16	6	10	1062	1135	−73	22	Qualification to playoffs
7	Yes-Al Gorgan	16	5	11	1089	1349	−260	21	Qualification to playoffs
8	Shahrdari Gorgan	16	3	13	1063	1251	−188	19	Qualification to playoffs
9	Raad Padafand Khuzestan	16	2	14	956	1308	−352	18	

Source: IRIBF

=== Results ===
Home \ Away	AZD	MAH	NIR	NAF	PET	RAD	SHG	SHT	YES
Azad University Tehran	—	63–58	69–73	60–64	69–88	71–55	63–60	56–78	83–71
Mahram Tehran	80–75	—	74–76	70–76	73–82	92–45	75–72	73–69	101–55
Niroo Zamini Tehran	36–60	62–79	—	59–70	66–77	78–66	81–63	76–80	74–59
Palayesh Naft Abadan	80–70	86–85	80–71	—	64–80	105–57	96–80	90–101	95–41
Petrochimi Bandar Imam	82–56	80–81	91–57	81–75	—	93–51	101–56	71–66	108–58
Raad Padafand Khuzestan	55–69	62–77	43–51	73–91	56–86	—	77–65	46–93	78–76
Shahrdari Gorgan	68–72	62–77	76–70	71–76	74–88	68–59	—	56–73	82–77
Shahrdari Tabriz	81–74	59–68	79–70	78–68	89–93	103–49	96–52	—	102–57
Yes-Al Gorgan	72–61	72–89	69–62	78–77	86–107	90–84	70–58	58–88	—

Source: IRIBF
Legend: Blue = home team win; Red = away team win.

== Playoffs ==
Quarterfinals
1	Petrochimi Bandar Imam	3
8	Shahrdari Gorgan	0
4	Mahram Tehran	3
5	Azad University Tehran	1
2	Shahrdari Tabriz	3
7	Yes-Al Gorgan	0
3	Palayesh Naft Abadan	3
6	Niroo Zamini Tehran	0

Semifinals
1	Petrochimi Bandar Imam	2
4	Mahram Tehran	3
2	Shahrdari Tabriz	3
3	Palayesh Naft Abadan	2

Final
4	Mahram Tehran	2
2	Shahrdari Tabriz	3
Third place
1	Petrochimi Bandar Imam	3
3	Palayesh Naft Abadan	0

=== Quarterfinals ===
The higher-seeded team played the first, second and fifth leg (if necessary) at home.

Team 1	Series	Team 2	Game 1	Game 2	Game 3	Game 4	Game 5
Petrochimi Bandar Imam	3–0	Shahrdari Gorgan	89–73	83–57	98–69		
Mahram Tehran	3–1	Azad University Tehran	80–70	75–66	96–101 (2OT)	83–79	
Shahrdari Tabriz	3–0	Yes-Al Gorgan	95–61	89–72	99–64		
Palayesh Naft Abadan	3–0	Niroo Zamini Tehran	85–73	78–60	72–67		

=== Semifinals ===
The higher-seeded team played the first, second and fifth leg (if necessary) at home.

Team 1	Series	Team 2	Game 1	Game 2	Game 3	Game 4	Game 5
Petrochimi Bandar Imam	2–3	Mahram Tehran	92–75	77–83	94–88	87–94	94–106
Shahrdari Tabriz	3–2	Palayesh Naft Abadan	81–75	69–75	69–77	101–95 (OT)	99–92

=== Third place ===
The higher-seeded team played the first, second and fifth leg (if necessary) at home.

Team 1	Series	Team 2	Game 1	Game 2	Game 3	Game 4	Game 5
Petrochimi Bandar Imam	3–0	Palayesh Naft Abadan	88–78	87–70	106–102		

=== Final ===
The higher-seeded team played the first, second and fifth leg (if necessary) at home.

Team 1	Series	Team 2	Game 1	Game 2	Game 3	Game 4	Game 5
Shahrdari Tabriz	3–2	Mahram Tehran	85–82	87–97	91–94	95–86	85–73

5 February 2018
16:00

Report

Shahrdari Tabriz	85–82	Mahram Tehran
Scoring by quarter: 20–21, 29–17, 20–24, 16–20
Pts: Jordan, Puljko, Arghavan 18; Rebs: Jordan 11; Asts: Jordan 7		Pts: Pullen 38; Rebs: Moultrie 18; Asts: Hosseinzadeh 4

Sadra Arena, Tabriz

6 February 2018
16:00

Report

Shahrdari Tabriz	87–97	Mahram Tehran
Scoring by quarter: 22–20, 21–24, 24–21, 20–32
Pts: Puljko 24; Rebs: Kardoust, Pazirofteh 8 Asts: Jordan 7		Pts: Pullen 33; Rebs: Moultrie 10; Asts: Pullen 6

Sadra Arena, Tabriz

9 February 2018
16:00

Report

Mahram Tehran	94–91	Shahrdari Tabriz
Scoring by quarter: 17–21, 32–28, 21–24, 24–18
Pts: Pullen 33; Rebs: Moultrie 8 Asts: Pullen 6		Pts: Jordan 22; Rebs: Jordan, Kardoust 7 Asts: Davoudi 5

Azadi Basketball Hall, Tehran

10 February 2018
16:00

Report

Mahram Tehran	86–95	Shahrdari Tabriz
Scoring by quarter: 11–23, 23–22, 26–26, 26–24
Pts: Hosseinzadeh 39; Rebs: Rezaeifar, Sedighi, Moultrie 4 Asts: Pullen 4		Pts: Jordan 24; Rebs: Kardoust 13; Asts: Puljko 8

Azadi Basketball Hall, Tehran

13 February 2018
16:00

Report

Shahrdari Tabriz	85–73	Mahram Tehran
Scoring by quarter: 27–16, 22–19, 16–27, 20–11
Pts: Jordan 26; Rebs: Kardoust 14; Asts: Puljko 6		Pts: Pullen 25; Rebs: Moultrie 11; Asts: Rezaeifar 4

Sadra Arena, Tabriz
