= Alade Aminu =

Nigerian-American basketball player (born 1987)

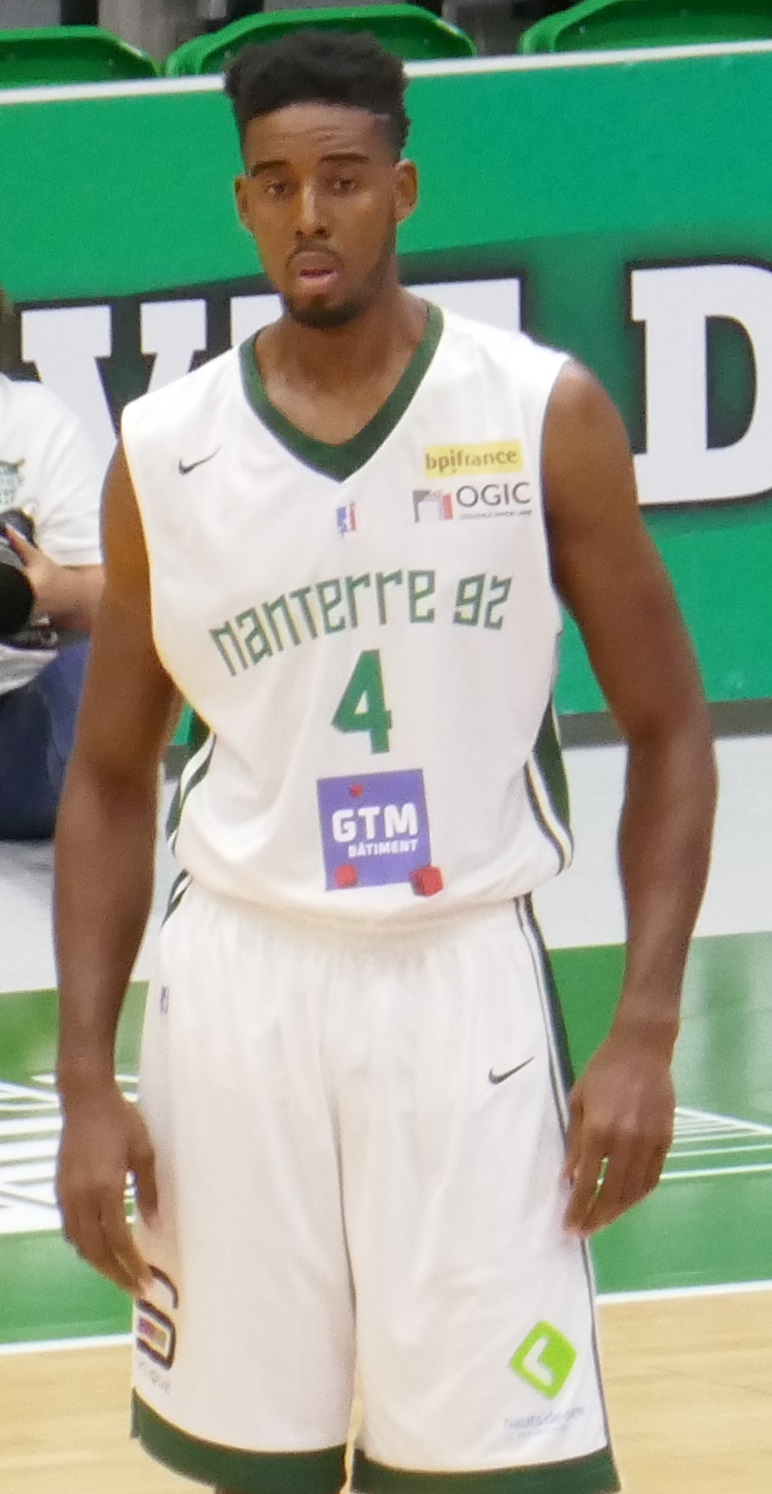
- Aminu with Nanterre 92 in 2017

Personal information
- Born: September 14, 1987 (age 39) Atlanta, Georgia, U.S.
- Listed height: 6 ft 10 in (2.08 m)
- Listed weight: 235 lb (107 kg)

Career information
- High school: Stephenson (Stone Mountain, Georgia)
- College: Georgia Tech (2005–2009)
- NBA draft: 2009: undrafted
- Playing career: 2009–2022
- Position: Center
- Number: 4, 14, 21, 34, 42

Career history
- 2009–2010: Erie BayHawks
- 2010: Bakersfield Jam
- 2010–2012: Élan Chalon
- 2012–2013: Pınar Karşıyaka
- 2013: Enel Brindisi
- 2014: Banvit
- 2014–2015: TED Ankara
- 2015–2016: Hapoel Eilat
- 2016–2017: Al Riyadi
- 2017–2018: Nanterre 92
- 2018–2019: Hapoel Tel Aviv
- 2019–2020: Polski Cukier Toruń
- 2020–2021: Bilbao Basket
- 2021: Shahrdari Gorgan
- 2021: Atléticos de San Germán
- 2022: Gigantes de Carolina

Career highlights
- Iranian League champion (2021); French League champion (2012); Lebanese League champion (2017); 2× French Cup winner (2011, 2012); French Leader Cup winner (2012); French League All-Star (2012); Israeli League All-Star (2016); Israeli League Rebounding Leader (2016); NBA D-League All-Star (2010); All-NBA D-League Third Team (2010)
- Stats at Basketball Reference
Medals
Men's basketball
Representing Nigeria
FIBA Africa Championship
Gold medal – first place	2015 Tunisia

Abdul Wahab "Alade" Aminu (born September 14, 1987) is a Nigerian-American former professional basketball player. He played college basketball for the Georgia Tech Yellow Jackets, before playing professionally in France, Turkey, Italy, Israel, and Lebanon. In 2015–16, he was the top rebounder in the Israel Basketball Premier League.

== Early life and college career ==
Aminu attended Stephenson High School in Stone Mountain, Georgia. He played college basketball for the Georgia Institute of Technology's Yellow Jackets.

In his freshman year at Georgia Tech, Aminu came off the bench in 24 games, averaging 2.4 points and 1.8 rebounds per game, while shooting 48.9% from the floor.

In his sophomore year, Aminu's role increased slightly, in which he played 18 games, averaging 5.4 points and 3.2 rebounds per game, shooting 58.3% from the floor (his best shooting percentage during his college career).

In his senior year, he averaged 11.8 points, 7.9 rebounds and 1.1 steals per game, shooting 52.2% from the floor.

== Professional career ==
=== D-League (2009–2010) ===
After going undrafted in the 2009 NBA draft, Aminu joined the Washington Wizards for the 2009 NBA Summer League. On November 5, 2009, Aminu was selected with the 10th overall pick in the 2009 NBA D-League by the Fort Wayne Mad Ants. However, he was subsequently acquired by the Erie BayHawks in a trade. On February 13, 2010, Aminu participated in the 2010 D-League All-Star Game.

On March 2, 2010, The BayHawks sent Aminu in a trade to the Bakersfield Jam. In 9 games played for the Jam, he averaged 19.3 points and 9.2 rebounds per game.

On March 26, 2010, Aminu signed a 10-day contract with the Miami Heat. However, Aminu was later waived by the Heat on April 7.

=== Élan Chalon (2010–2012) ===
In July 2010, Aminu joined the Charlotte Bobcats and the Atlanta Hawks for the 2010 NBA Summer League.

On July 9, 2010, Aminu signed with the French team Élan Chalon for the 2010–11 season. On May 21, 2011, Aminu recorded a career-high 27 points, shooting 13-of-14 from the field, along with six rebounds in an 85–107 blowout loss to ASVEL Basket. Aminu won the 2011 French Cup with Chalon.

On June 13, 2011, Aminu signed a one-year contract extension with Chalon. In his second season with the team, Aminu won the a treble – the 2012 French Leaders Cup, the 2012 French Cup and the 2012 French League Championship titles with Chalon. In 54 games played during the 2011–12 season, he averaged 11.9 points, 6.7 rebounds and 1 steals per game.

=== Pınar Karşıyaka (2012–2013) ===
On August 24, 2012, Aminu signed with the Turkish team Pınar Karşıyaka for the 2012–13 season. Aminu helped Karşıyaka reach the 2013 FIBA EuroChallenge Finals, where they eventually lost to Krasnye Krylia.

=== Enel Brindisi and Banvit (2013–2014) ===
In July 2013, Aminu joined the Toronto Raptors for the 2013 NBA Summer League.

On September 23, 2013, Aminu signed a one-year deal with the Italian team Enel Brindisi. However, on December 30, 2013, Aminu parted ways with Brindisi. On January 6, 2014, Aminu returned to Turkey for a second stint, joining Banvit for the rest of the season. Aminu helped Banvit reach the 2014 Turkish League Semifinals, where they were eventually eliminated by Galatasaray.

=== TED Ankara (2014–2015) ===
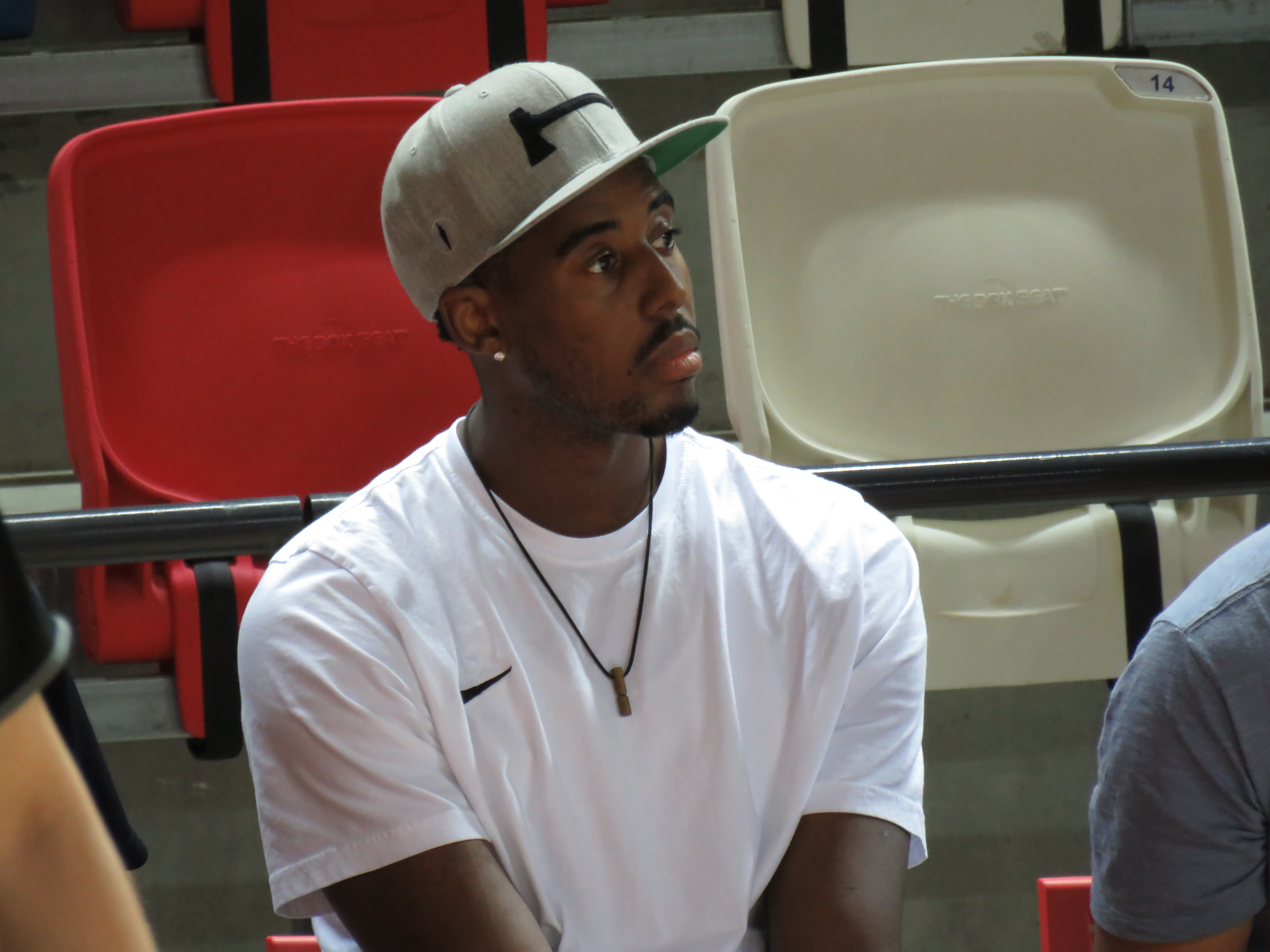
Aminu in September 2015

On August 15, 2014, Aminu signed with TED Ankara for the 2014–15 season. On February 28, 2015, Aminu recorded a season-high 26 points without missing a single shot (12-of-12 from the field), along with eleven rebounds in an 85–97 loss to Eskişehir.

=== Hapoel Eilat (2015–2016) ===
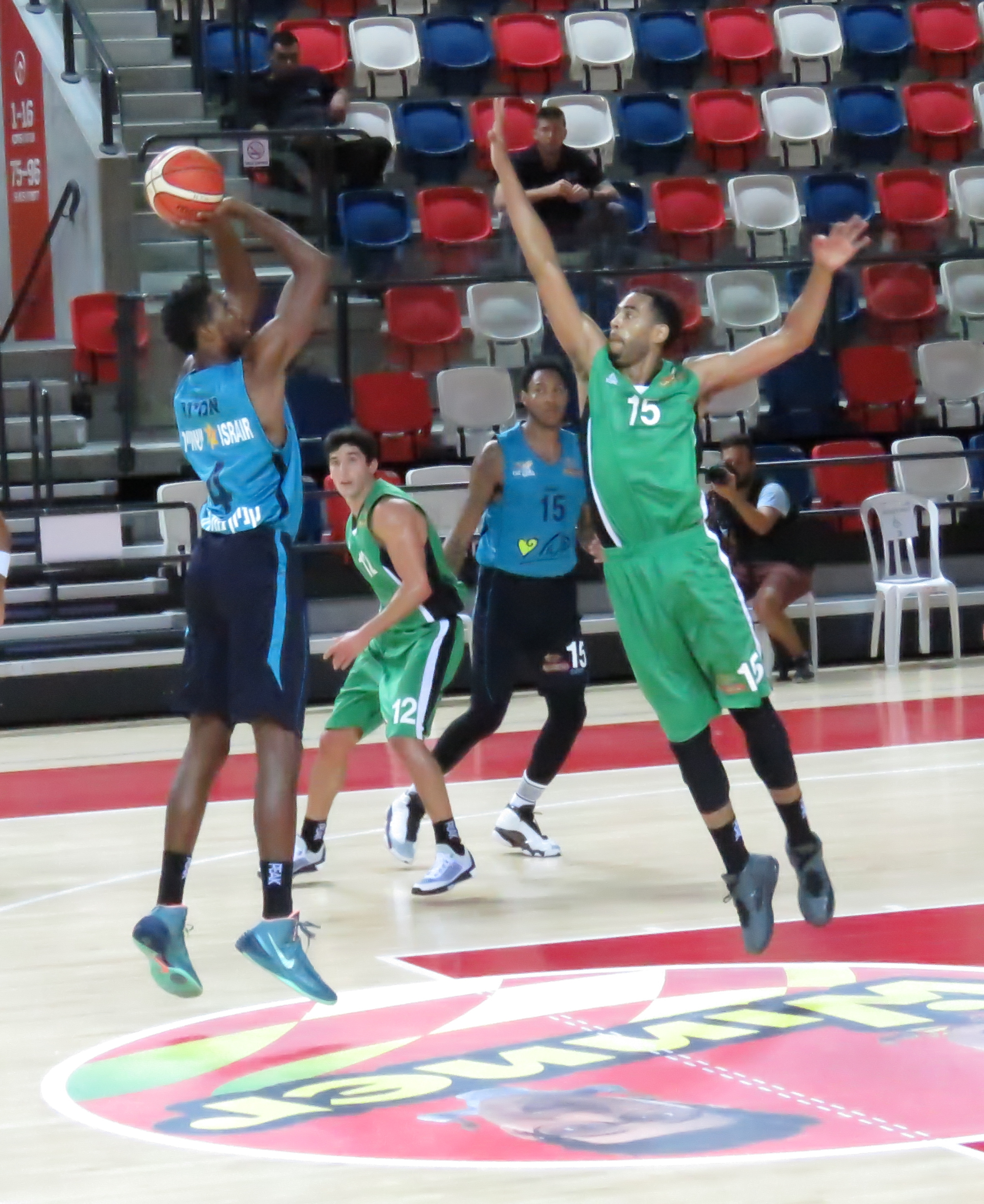
Aminu (left) with Hapoel Eilat in September 2015

On September 11, 2015, Aminu signed a one-year deal with the Israeli team Hapoel Eilat. On October 26, 2015, Aminu recorded a season-high 25 points, shooting 8-of-13 from the field, along with twelve rebounds, five assists and two steals in an 84–86 loss to Ironi Nahariya. On March 25, 2016, Aminu participated in the 2016 Israeli All-Star Game and the Slam Dunk Contest during the same event.

In 37 games played for Eilat, Aminu finished the season as the 2016 Israeli League Rebounding Leader with 10 rebounds per game, and third-leading player in efficiency rating (22.6 per game). He also averaged 14.7 points, 1.5 assists and 1.7 blocks per game. Aminu helped Eilat reach the 2016 Israeli League Semifinals, where they eventually lost to Hapoel Jerusalem.

=== Al Riyadi (2016–2017) ===
On August 8, 2016, Aminu signed with the Lebanese team Sporting Al Riyadi Beirut. In 37 games played during the 2016–17 season, he averaged 15 points, 9.3 rebounds, 1.5 assists. 1.3 steals and 1.1 blocks per game. Aminu won the 2017 Lebanese League Championship with Al Riyadi.

=== Nanterre 92 (2017–2018) ===
On July 28, 2017, Aminu returned to France for a second stint, signing a one-year deal with Nanterre 92. Aminu helped Nanterre reach the 2018 FIBA Champions League Round of 16, where they were eventually eliminated by his former team Banvit.

=== Hapoel Tel Aviv (2018–2019) ===
On July 26, 2018, Aminu signed with the Israeli team Hapoel Tel Aviv for the 2018–19 season. On November 19, 2018, Aminu recorded a season-highs 21 points and 13 rebounds, shooting 9-of-13 from the field, in an 85–62 win over Maccabi Rishon LeZion. Aminu helped Hapoel reach the 2019 Israeli League Playoffs, where they eventually were eliminated by Maccabi Tel Aviv in the Quarterfinals.

=== Polski Cukier Toruń (2019–2020) ===
On September 10, 2019, he signed with Polski Cukier Toruń of the PLK.

=== Bilbao Basket (2020–2021) ===
On December 16, 2020, Aminu signed a two-month contract with Bilbao Basket of the Liga ACB.

=== Shahrdari Gorgan (2021) ===
On February 8, 2021, Aminu signed with Shahrdari Gorgan of the Iranian Basketball Super League (IBSL). In April, he won the 2020–21 IBSL championship.

=== Atléticos de San Germán / Gigantes de Carolina (2021–2022) ===
On May 27, 2021, Aminu signed with Atléticos de San Germán of the Baloncesto Superior Nacional. On May 2, 2022, he parted ways with the team. The next day, he signed with Gigantes de Carolina.

== Nigerian national team ==
Aminu is a member of the senior men's Nigerian national basketball team. He participated in the 2012 and the 2016 Summer Olympics.

In August 2015, Aminu helped the Nigerian team to win the 2015 AfroBasket and earning a gold medal.

== Personal life ==
Aminu's father is from Nigeria, and his mother is from New York City. He was born in Atlanta, and grew up in nearby Stone Mountain, Georgia. His brother, Al-Farouq, was a professional basketball player who most notably played for the Portland Trail Blazers of the NBA.
