= 2019–20 Iranian Basketball Super League =

Locations of the 2019–20 season teams

The 2019–20 Iran Super League season was the 30th season of the Iranian basketball league.

== Regular season ==
=== Standings ===
Pos	Team	Pld	W	L	PF	PA	PD	Pts	Qualification
1	Shahrdari Gorgan	24	22	2	1757	1352	+405	46	Qualification to playoffs
2	Petrochimi Bandar Imam	24	19	5	1823	1454	+369	43	Qualification to playoffs
3	Chemidor Qom	24	18	6	1935	1674	+261	42	Qualification to playoffs
4	Palayesh Naft Abadan	24	18	6	1773	1579	+194	42	Qualification to playoffs
5	Mahram Tehran	24	17	7	1835	1626	+209	41	Qualification to playoffs
6	Avijeh Sanat Parsa Mashhad	24	16	8	1856	1744	+112	40	Qualification to playoffs
7	Shahrdari Bandar Abbas	24	10	14	1695	1791	−96	34	Qualification to playoffs
8	Exxon Tehran	24	10	14	1777	1780	−3	34	Qualification to playoffs
9	Zob Ahan Isfahan	24	11	13	1640	1699	−59	34	
10	Raad Padafand Shahrekord	24	5	19	1551	1900	−349	29	
11	Sanat Mes Kerman	24	5	19	1587	1923	−336	29	
12	Shora & Shahrdari Qazvin	24	3	21	1655	1915	−260	27	
13	Niroo Zamini Tehran	24	2	22	1464	1911	−447	25	
—	Toufargan Azarshahr	0	0	0	0	0	0	0	Withdrew

Source: IRIBF

=== Results ===
Home \ Away	AVI	CHE	EXX	MAH	NIR	NAF	PET	RAD	MES	SHB	SHG	SSQ	TUF	ZOB
Avijeh Sanat Parsa Mashhad	—	79–87	70–67	71–81	85–73	81–83	79–71	91–75	81–50	92–74	83–87	88–79	86–66	109–89
Chemidor Qom	78–70	—	70–65	68–66	86–72	81–85	63–82	95–46	88–63	93–63	80–86	97–71	85–75	89–82
Exxon Tehran	117–118	68–73	—	68–72	82–70	46–57	53–82	83–61	78–62	70–67	57–70	77–73	86–82	76–80
Mahram Tehran	63–68	83–82	92–76	—	89–50	55–58	61–64	73–47	80–58	86–69	67–66	86–62	89–71	80–83
Niroo Zamini Tehran	44–53	67–89	63–84	70–91	—	54–74	53–96	77–101	76–80	74–55	69–82	81–72	X	55–83
Palayesh Naft Abadan	59–74	66–72	91–90	86–93	97–54	—	76–66	96–65	92–67	81–69	61–70	85–62	93–87	57–66
Petrochimi Bandar Imam	84–43	75–73	86–78	74–76	20–0	69–66	—	98–48	92–38	78–58	55–70	94–67 (Note: The game wasn't held amidst concerns over the coronavirus pandemic, the first leg result was also counted for the second leg.)	86–61	67–52
Raad Padafand Shahrekord	76–77	68–83	67–74	49–63	72–60	59–72	51–89	—	69–72	70–69	60–78	79–75	70–74	72–84
Sanat Mes Kerman	70–60	63–88	91–95	80–87	82–57	51–67	76–83	70–87	—	66–69	61–85	77–71	79–76	78–96
Shahrdari Bandar Abbas	57–58	63–93	68–62	83–75	94–73	58–63	73–79	89–69	82–76	—	56–72	85–81	81–90	74–60
Shahrdari Gorgan	62–58	73–58	70–57	65–46	78–49	53–61	66–47	77–40	84–47	85–76	—	84–58	20–0	82–44
Shora & Shahrdari Qazvin	64–85	57–71	62–67	76–89	81–64	65–75	67–94	72–61	75–61	69–76	62–92	—	63–56	63–73
Toufargan Azarshahr	56–68	81–88	70–73	X	79–53	61–81	0–20	93–85	80–65	X	61–73	83–87	—	96–75
Zob Ahan Isfahan	54–83	61–78	65–87	53–81	85–59	59–65	67–78	83–59	81–48	66–68	0–20	74–71	74–77	—

Source: IRIBF
Legend: Blue = home team win; Red = away team win.
Matches with lighter background shading were decided after overtime.

== Playoffs ==
Quarterfinals
1	Shahrdari Gorgan
8	Exxon Tehran
4	Palayesh Naft Abadan
5	Mahram Tehran
2	Petrochimi Bandar Imam
7	Shahrdari Bandar Abbas
3	Chemidor Qom
6	Avijeh Sanat Parsa Mashhad

Semifinals

Final
Third place

- The Iranian government postponed the playoffs due to the coronavirus pandemic in Iran. On April 15, 2020, after two months of suspension, the Iranian Basketball Federation officially ended the 2019–20 season, the title was not assigned.
