= Jonas Lalehzadeh =

American Iranian basketball player

No. 22 – Petrochimi Mahshahr
- Position: Shooting guard
- League: Iran Super League

Personal information
- Listed height: 6 ft 5 in (1.96 m)

Career information
- College: UC Irvine

Career history
- 2011–2012: Petrochimi Bandar Imam (Iran)
- 2012–present: Petrochimi Mahshahr

Jonas Lalehzadeh is an American Iranian professional basketball player playing in the Iran Super League and NBA Developmental League. He led the Iranian Superleague in scoring and total points scored for the 2012–2013 season.
