= 1998–99 Iranian Basketball Super League =

The following is the final results of the Iran Super League 1998/1999 basketball season. This season is the 1st season since the establishment of the Iran Super League.

== Participated teams ==
- Fajr Sepah Tehran
- Foolad Mobarakeh Isfahan
- Moghavemat Basij Shahrekord
- Paykan Tehran
- Rah Ahan Tehran
- Shahrdari Gorgan
- Tarbiat Badani Khorramabad
- Zob Ahan Isfahan

== Final standing ==
1. Zob Ahan Isfahan
2. Paykan Tehran
3. Fajr Sepah Tehran
