= 2014–15 Iranian Basketball Super League =

Locations of the 2014–15 season teams

The 2014–15 Iran Super League season was the 25th season of the Iranian basketball league. The league used the two-conference format this time, starting with the National League. The Professional League was the second conference in the season. Teams were not allowed to hire foreign players or imports in the first conference National League.

== Conference 1 ==
=== Regular season ===
==== Standings ====
Pos	Team	Pld	W	L	PF	PA	PD	Pts	Qualification
1	Mahram Tehran	16	14	2	1245	1002	+243	30	Qualification to playoffs
2	Azad University Tehran	16	13	3	1159	965	+194	29	Qualification to playoffs
3	Petrochimi Bandar Imam	16	13	3	1284	1023	+261	29	Qualification to playoffs
4	Foolad Haft Almas Qazvin	16	8	8	1149	1164	−15	24	Qualification to playoffs
5	Palayesh Naft Abadan	16	8	8	1154	1187	−33	24	
6	Pemina Isfahan	16	6	10	1097	1161	−64	22	
7	Shahrdari Gorgan	16	6	10	1053	1091	−38	22	
8	Samen Mashhad	16	3	13	1127	1252	−125	19	
9	Sanaye Petrochimi Mahshahr	16	1	15	857	1280	−423	17	

Source: IRIBF

==== Results ====
Home \ Away	AZD	FHA	MAH	NAF	PEM	PET	SAM	SPM	SHG
Azad University Tehran	—	68–48	49–62	82–67	71–57	83–66	65–62	89–52	57–48
Foolad Haft Almas Qazvin	72–71	—	64–71	84–72	77–61	73–75	64–53	88–59	68–82
Mahram Tehran	70–77	95–74	—	74–58	82–66	71–66	82–59	95–52	76–48
Palayesh Naft Abadan	51–70	86–78	65–86	—	86–78	79–86	79–69	65–54	88–94
Pemina Isfahan	56–63	76–85	71–82	68–72	—	60–70	81–77	87–53	62–55
Petrochimi Bandar Imam	91–87	94–60	72–75	75–49	92–48	—	77–49	97–39	82–78
Samen Mashhad	72–89	79–87	64–80	78–87	83–84	65–95	—	106–87	66–64
Sanaye Petrochimi Mahshahr	43–71	58–68	41–71	43–77	51–62	53–75	64–84	—	75–72
Shahrdari Gorgan	48–67	64–59	76–73	68–73	62–80	54–71	67–61	73–33	—

Source: IRIBF
Legend: Blue = home team win; Red = away team win.

=== Playoffs ===
- The results of the games during the regular season shall be taken into account for the playoffs.

Semifinals
1	Mahram Tehran	3
4	Foolad Haft Almas Qazvin	0
2	Azad University Tehran	2
3	Petrochimi Bandar Imam	3

Final
1	Mahram Tehran	3
3	Petrochimi Bandar Imam	1
Third place
4	Foolad Haft Almas Qazvin	1
2	Azad University Tehran	3

==== Semifinals ====
The higher-seeded team played the third and fifth leg (if necessary) at home.

Team 1	Series	Team 2	Game 1	Game 2	Game 3	Game 4	Game 5
Mahram Tehran	3–0	Foolad Haft Almas Qazvin	95–74	71–64	87–59		
Azad University Tehran	2–3	Petrochimi Bandar Imam	83–66	87–91	70–66	69–72	68–73

==== Third place ====
The higher-seeded team played the third and fifth leg (if necessary) at home.

Team 1	Series	Team 2	Game 1	Game 2	Game 3	Game 4	Game 5
Azad University Tehran	3–1	Foolad Haft Almas Qazvin	71–72	68–48	68–64	88–70	

==== Final ====
The higher-seeded team played the third and fifth leg (if necessary) at home.

Team 1	Series	Team 2	Game 1	Game 2	Game 3	Game 4	Game 5
Mahram Tehran	3–1	Petrochimi Bandar Imam	75–72	71–66	54–61	74–73	

== Conference 2 ==
=== Regular season ===
==== Standings ====
Pos	Team	Pld	W	L	PF	PA	PD	Pts	Qualification
1	Azad University Tehran	16	14	2	1295	1064	+231	30	Qualification to playoffs
2	Mahram Tehran	16	13	3	1407	1169	+238	29	Qualification to playoffs
3	Petrochimi Bandar Imam	16	13	3	1335	1104	+231	29	Qualification to playoffs
4	Shahrdari Gorgan	16	9	7	1202	1245	−43	25	Qualification to playoffs
5	Palayesh Naft Abadan	16	8	8	1330	1303	+27	24	
6	Sanaye Petrochimi Mahshahr	16	6	10	1183	1391	−208	22	
7	Pemina Isfahan	16	4	12	1205	1236	−31	20	
8	Samen Mashhad	16	4	12	1188	1399	−211	20	
9	Foolad Haft Almas Qazvin	16	1	15	1005	1239	−234	17	

Source: IRIBF

==== Results ====
Home \ Away	AZD	FHA	MAH	NAF	PEM	PET	SAM	SPM	SHG
Azad University Tehran	—	92–40	67–83	90–84	72–56	70–54	93–51	92–57	78–64
Foolad Haft Almas Qazvin	51–72	—	65–84	57–69	70–77	56–83	64–66	66–67	72–75
Mahram Tehran	70–73	83–54	—	94–91	89–78	88–89	103–86	115–70	91–45
Palayesh Naft Abadan	81–68	70–73	81–80	—	93–87	65–70	96–78	94–95	108–88
Pemina Isfahan	82–87	73–57	57–64	84–74	—	64–69	87–78	78–82	68–77
Petrochimi Bandar Imam	72–79	86–62	91–99	88–68	74–72	—	85–52	102–63	87–75
Samen Mashhad	76–102	84–80	68–89	86–89	91–88	60–103	—	89–95	87–90
Sanaye Petrochimi Mahshahr	81–86	85–74	77–91	84–100	84–83	51–91	58–67	—	73–76
Shahrdari Gorgan	62–74	73–64	77–84	81–67	75–71	80–91	77–69	87–61	—

Source: IRIBF
Legend: Blue = home team win; Red = away team win.

=== Playoffs ===
- The results of the games during the regular season shall be taken into account for the playoffs.

Semifinals
1	Azad University Tehran	4
4	Shahrdari Gorgan	0
2	Mahram Tehran	4
3	Petrochimi Bandar Imam	1

Final
1	Azad University Tehran	3
2	Mahram Tehran	4
Third place
4	Shahrdari Gorgan	0
3	Petrochimi Bandar Imam	3

==== Semifinals ====
The higher-seeded team played the third, fourth and seventh leg (if necessary) at home.

Team 1	Series	Team 2	Game 1	Game 2	Game 3	Game 4	Game 5	Game 6	Game 7
Azad University Tehran	4–0	Shahrdari Gorgan	78–64	74–62	96–78	93–68			
Mahram Tehran	4–1	Petrochimi Bandar Imam	88–89	99–91	73–66	70–56	82–75		

==== Third place ====
The higher-seeded team played the third and fifth leg (if necessary) at home.

Team 1	Series	Team 2	Game 1	Game 2	Game 3	Game 4	Game 5
Petrochimi Bandar Imam	3–0	Shahrdari Gorgan	87–75	91–80	85–67		

==== Final ====
The higher-seeded team played the third, fourth and seventh leg (if necessary) at home.

Team 1	Series	Team 2	Game 1	Game 2	Game 3	Game 4	Game 5	Game 6	Game 7
Azad University Tehran	3–4	Mahram Tehran	73–70	67–83	84–78	77–67	77–85	79–93	92–95 (OT)
