= 1999–2000 Iranian Basketball Super League =

The following are the final results of the Iran Super League 1999/2000 basketball season.

== Participated teams ==
- Dokhaniat Urmia
- Fajr Sepah Tehran
- Foolad Mobarakeh Isfahan
- Homa Tehran
- Paykan Tehran
- Rah Ahan Tehran
- Shahrdari Gorgan
- Zob Ahan Isfahan

== Final standing ==
1. Zob Ahan Isfahan
2. Paykan Tehran
3. Shahrdari Gorgan
4. Foolad Mobarakeh Isfahan
