= 2015–16 Iranian Basketball Super League =

Basketball Season

Locations of the 2015–16 season teams

The 2015–16 Iran Super League season was the 26th season of the Iranian basketball league.

== Regular season ==
=== Standings ===
Pos	Team	Pld	W	L	PF	PA	PD	Pts	Qualification
1	Petrochimi Bandar Imam	24	20	4	1926	1596	+330	44	Qualification to playoffs
2	Chemidor Tehran	24	18	6	1752	1613	+139	42	Qualification to playoffs
3	Palayesh Naft Abadan	24	17	7	1811	1777	+34	41	Qualification to playoffs
4	Shahrdari Arak	24	15	9	1912	1809	+103	39	Qualification to playoffs
5	Azad University Tehran	24	13	11	1810	1682	+128	37	Qualification to playoffs
6	Shahrdari Gorgan	24	11	13	1813	1832	−19	35	Qualification to playoffs
7	Samen Mashhad	24	8	16	1770	1868	−98	32	Qualification to playoffs
8	Shahrdari Tabriz	24	3	21	1523	1788	−265	27	Qualification to playoffs
9	Niroo Zamini Tehran	24	3	21	1432	1784	−352	27	
—	Ayandehsazan Mihan Isfahan	0	0	0	0	0	0	0	Withdrew

Source: IRIBF

=== Results ===
==== Round 1 ====
Home \ Away	AYA	AZD	CHE	NIR	NAF	PET	SAM	SHA	SHG	SHT
Ayandehsazan Mihan Isfahan	—	55–80	68–86	66–58	78–84	53–79	62–64	61–90	0–20	67–60
Azad University Tehran	97–80	—	56–66	97–57	87–54	82–73	76–56	69–73	95–92	70–51
Chemidor Tehran	86–61	67–70	—	83–47	77–67	67–77	83–70	72–65	76–72	68–59
Niroo Zamini Tehran	20–0	57–79	51–58	—	74–76	52–77	63–71	51–102	57–55	63–67
Palayesh Naft Abadan	68–58	81–68	77–67	68–62	—	82–78	74–65	78–82	94–72	75–65
Petrochimi Bandar Imam	95–60	75–65	83–50	89–52	91–67	—	86–90	78–77	87–63	77–43
Samen Mashhad	97–81	79–83	73–77	68–69	72–84	83–94	—	74–79	72–87	84–68
Shahrdari Arak	68–60	89–86	90–76	81–63	79–81	70–73	73–69	—	93–90	71–65
Shahrdari Gorgan	78–61	80–76	62–78	91–83	82–80	70–59	79–87	88–75	—	76–66
Shahrdari Tabriz	69–66	47–65	63–81	53–58	62–66	64–87	52–54	74–82	53–62	—

Source: IRIBF
Legend: Blue = home team win; Red = away team win.
Matches with lighter background shading were decided after overtime.

==== Round 2 ====
Home \ Away	AZD	CHE	NIR	NAF	PET	SAM	SHA	SHG	SHT
Azad University Tehran	—		78–61		63–70	72–73		87–85	80–58
Chemidor Tehran	68–61	—	71–56	84–60		81–73		67–56	78–67
Niroo Zamini Tehran			—					46–63	63–65
Palayesh Naft Abadan	87–77		66–62	—	64–78	89–85		83–68	81–70
Petrochimi Bandar Imam		76–60	74–63		—		82–71		86–59
Samen Mashhad			76–59		66–92	—		71–67	90–98
Shahrdari Arak	83–68	82–97	76–63	70–77		83–69	—	84–91	82–75
Shahrdari Gorgan					73–84			—	89–79
Shahrdari Tabriz									—

Source: IRIBF
Legend: Blue = home team win; Red = away team win.
Matches with lighter background shading were decided after overtime.

== Playoffs ==
- The results of three games between the teams during the regular season shall be taken into account for the playoffs in the quarterfinals and the semifinals.

Quarterfinals
1	Petrochimi Bandar Imam	4
8	Shahrdari Tabriz	0
4	Shahrdari Arak	4
5	Azad University Tehran	3
2	Chemidor Tehran	4
7	Samen Mashhad	0
3	Palayesh Naft Abadan	4
6	Shahrdari Gorgan	1

Semifinals
1	Petrochimi Bandar Imam	4
4	Shahrdari Arak	0
2	Chemidor Tehran	3
3	Palayesh Naft Abadan	4

Final
1	Petrochimi Bandar Imam	4
3	Palayesh Naft Abadan	0
Third place
4	Shahrdari Arak	0
2	Chemidor Tehran	3

5th–8th semifinals
8	Shahrdari Tabriz	WD
5	Azad University Tehran
7	Samen Mashhad	4
6	Shahrdari Gorgan	1

Fifth place
8	Shahrdari Tabriz
7	Samen Mashhad	WD
Seventh place
5	Azad University Tehran
6	Shahrdari Gorgan	WD

=== Quarterfinals ===
The higher-seeded team played the fifth and seventh leg (if necessary) at home.

Team 1	Series	Team 2	Game 1	Game 2	Game 3	Game 4	Game 5	Game 6	Game 7
Petrochimi Bandar Imam	4–0	Shahrdari Tabriz	77–43	87–64	86–59	96–69			
Shahrdari Arak	4–3	Azad University Tehran	73–69	89–86	83–68	71–76	85–86	73–97	91–90
Chemidor Tehran	4–0	Samen Mashhad	83–70	77–73	81–73	65–64			
Palayesh Naft Abadan	4–1	Shahrdari Gorgan	80–82	94–72	83–68	79–74	78–77		

=== Classification ===
The higher-seeded team played the fourth, sixth and seventh leg (if necessary) at home.

Team 1	Series	Team 2	Game 1	Game 2	Game 3	Game 4	Game 5	Game 6	Game 7
Shahrdari Gorgan	1–4	Samen Mashhad	87–72	79–87	67–71	67–83	69–97		

=== Semifinals ===
The higher-seeded team played the fifth and seventh leg (if necessary) at home.

Team 1	Series	Team 2	Game 1	Game 2	Game 3	Game 4	Game 5	Game 6	Game 7
Petrochimi Bandar Imam	4–0	Shahrdari Arak	78–77	73–70	82–71	100–86			
Chemidor Tehran	3–4	Palayesh Naft Abadan	67–77	77–67	84–60	83–90 (OT)	75–67	73–78	74–77

=== Third place ===
The higher-seeded team played the first, second and fifth leg (if necessary) at home.

Team 1	Series	Team 2	Game 1	Game 2	Game 3	Game 4	Game 5
Chemidor Tehran	3–0	Shahrdari Arak	89–83	79–74	65–63		

=== Final ===
The higher-seeded team played the first, second, fifth and seventh leg (if necessary) at home.

Team 1	Series	Team 2	Game 1	Game 2	Game 3	Game 4	Game 5	Game 6	Game 7
Petrochimi Bandar Imam	4–0	Palayesh Naft Abadan	77–71	74–55	76–72	83–57			

10 April 2016

Petrochimi Bandar Imam	77–71	Palayesh Naft Abadan
Scoring by quarter: 20–15, 14–15, 20–18, 23–23
Pts: Haddadi 23; Rebs: Haddadi 13; Asts: four players 2		Pts: Jamshidi 22; Rebs: Hassanzadeh 10; Asts: Jamshidi 4

Besat Andisheh Arena, Mahshahr

11 April 2016

Petrochimi Bandar Imam	74–55	Palayesh Naft Abadan
Scoring by quarter: 19–12, 11–16, 25–9, 19–18
Pts: Sosa 20; Rebs: Haddadi 11; Asts: Sosa 3		Pts: Hassanzadeh 11; Rebs: Hassanzadeh 12; Asts: Davoudi 4

Besat Andisheh Arena, Mahshahr

14 April 2016

Palayesh Naft Abadan	72–76	Petrochimi Bandar Imam
Scoring by quarter: 22–16, 11–16, 21–19, 18–25
Pts: Jovanović 23; Rebs: Hassanzadeh 10; Asts: Davoudi 4		Pts: Haddadi 23; Rebs: Haddadi 12; Asts: Sosa, Haddadi 4

17th Shahrivar Arena, Abadan

15 April 2016

Palayesh Naft Abadan	57–83	Petrochimi Bandar Imam
Scoring by quarter: 13–20, 12–23, 17–23, 15–17
Pts: Jovanović 22; Rebs: N'Doye 8 Asts: Khalilnejad 2		Pts: Dean 24; Rebs: Haddadi 9 Asts: Hosseinzadeh 4

17th Shahrivar Arena, Abadan
