= 2000–01 Iranian Basketball Super League =

The following is the final results of the Iran Super League 2000/01 basketball season.

== Participated teams ==
- Foolad Mobarakeh Isfahan
- Homa Tehran
- Iran Nara Tehran
- Moghavemat Basij Shiraz
- Paykan Tehran
- Rah Ahan Tehran
- Shahrdari Gorgan
- Zob Ahan Isfahan

== Final standing ==
1. Zob Ahan Isfahan
2. Foolad Mobarakeh Isfahan
3. Iran Nara Tehran
