= Navid Rezaeifar =

Iranian basketball player (born 1996)

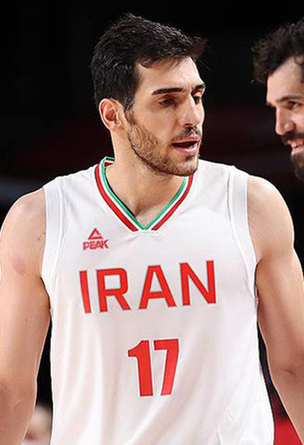

No. 7 – Shahrdari Gorgan
- Position: Shooting guard
- League: IBSL

Personal information
- Born: 23 August 1996 (age 30) Tonekabon, Iran
- Listed height: 6 ft 4 in (1.93 m)

Career history
- 2012–2018: Mahram Tehran
- 2018–2019: Petrochimi Bandar Imam
- 2019–2021: Shahrdari Gorgan
- 2021–2022: Chemidor Qom
- 2022–2023: Naft Abadan
- 2023–present: Shahrdari Gorgan
Medals
Men's basketball
Representing Iran
Asian Games
Silver medal – second place	2018 Jakarta	Team
Bronze medal – third place	2026 Aichi–Nagoya	Team
Asian Championship
Silver medal – second place	2017 Beirut
Bronze medal – third place	2025 Jeddah

Navid Rezaeifar (born 23 August 1996) is an Iranian basketball player for Shahrdari Gorgan and the Iranian national team.

He participated at the 2017 FIBA Asia Cup, and the 2020 Summer Olympics. He was named as one of the top 5 players in the 2017 William Jones Cup.
