= Nikola Maravić =

Serbian basketball player

No. 15 – Avijeh Sanat Parsa Mashhad
- Position: Center
- League: Iranian Basketball Super League

Personal information
- Born: July 31, 1989 (age 37) Belgrade, SFR Yugoslavia
- Listed height: 2.12 m (6 ft 11 in)
- Listed weight: 105 kg (231 lb)

Career information
- NBA draft: 2011: undrafted
- Playing career: 2006–present

Career history
- 2006–2012: Mega Vizura
- 2012–2013: Vršac
- 2013–2015: Borac Čačak
- 2015: Igokea
- 2015–2016: Cherno More
- 2016: Hallmann Vienna
- Dinamo Tbilisi
- 2017: Levski Sofia
- 2018: Academic Plovdiv
- 2018–2019: Levski Lukoil
- 2020–present: Avijeh Sanat Parsa Mashhad

Nikola Maravić (Serbian Cyrillic: Никола Маравић, born July 31, 1989) is a Serbian professional basketball player for Avijeh Sanat Parsa Mashhad of the Iranian Basketball Super League.

== Professional career ==
Maravić started his career in 2006 in Mega Vizura. He stayed in Mega until 2012. Then he signed with Vršac. On his debut for Vršac he scored 4 points in an 82–91 home defeat against Vojvodina. On August 23, 2013, he signed with Borac Čačak. On September 11, 2017, he signed with Levski Sofia.
