= Nikola Dragović =

Serbian basketball player

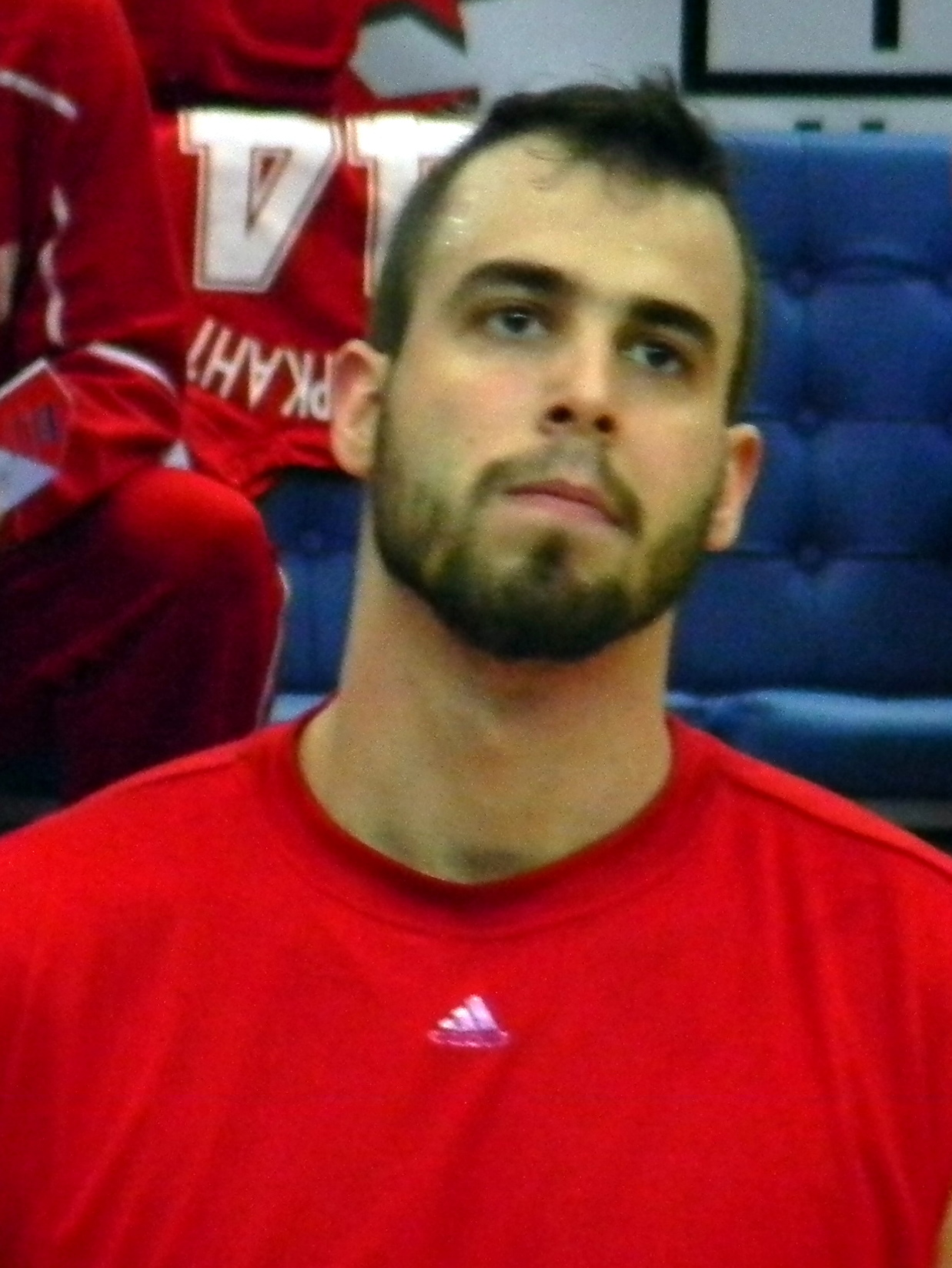
- Dragović with Spartak in March 2011.

Free agent
- Position: Power forward

Personal information
- Born: December 20, 1987 (age 38) Titograd, SR Montenegro, SFR Yugoslavia
- Listed height: 2.06 m (6 ft 9 in)
- Listed weight: 105 kg (231 lb)

Career information
- College: UCLA (2006–2010)
- NBA draft: 2010: undrafted
- Playing career: 2005–present

Career history
- 2005–2006: Mega Ishrana
- 2010–2012: Spartak Saint Petersburg
- 2012–2014: Scandone Avellino
- 2014–2015: Igokea
- 2015: Lukoil Academic
- 2015: Mitteldeutscher BC
- 2016: Vanoli Cremona
- 2016–2017: ASVEL
- 2017–2018: Basket Zaragoza
- 2018: Baxi Manresa
- 2019: Mineros de Zacatecas
- 2019–2020: Shahrdari Gorgan
- 2020–2021: OKK Beograd
- 2021: Kolossos Rodou
- 2021–2022: Nazm Avaran Sirjan
Medals
Men's basketball
Representing Serbia
Universiade
Gold medal – first place	2011 Shenzhen	Team competition
U20 European Championship
Gold medal – first place	2007 Slovenia	Team
Representing Serbia and Montenegro
U20 European Championship
Gold medal – first place	2006 Turkey	Team
U18 European Championship
Gold medal – first place	2005 Serbia and Montenegro	Team
European Championship for Cadets
Gold medal – first place	2003 Spain	Team

Nikola Dragović (born December 20, 1987) is a Serbian professional basketball player. He played college basketball at UCLA.

== Early career ==
Dragović grew up with KK Avala Ada (nowadays Mega Basket) juniors and made his debut with the senior team during the 2005–06 season.

From 2006 to 2010, Dragović played college basketball at UCLA.

== Professional career ==
In 2010, he signed for Spartak St. Petersburg and he stayed there till the end of 2011–12 season when his contract has expired and the team decided not to prolong it. The forward struggled with injuries throughout the 2011–12 season missing bigger part of the games.

In August 2012, he signed with Italian team Sidigas Avellino. In August 2013, he re-signed with them for one more season.

In September 2014, he signed a one-year deal with Igokea. On February 4, 2015, he left Igokea. Later that month, he signed with Lukoil Academic of the Bulgarian League for the rest of the season.

In November 2015, he signed with the German club Mitteldeutscher BC of the Basketball Bundesliga for the rest of the season. On January 3, 2016, he left Mitteldeutscher BC and signed with Vanoli Cremona of the Italian Serie A for the rest of the season.

On July 5, 2016, he signed with French club ASVEL Basket.

On August 1, 2017, he signed with Spanish club Basket Zaragoza for the 2017–18 season.

In January 2019, Dragović joined Mexican team Mineros de Zacatecas.

On March 19, 2021, Dragović moved to Greece for Kolossos Rodou. In three games, he averaged 7.7 points and 3.7 rebounds per game. On October 12, Dragović signed with Nazm Avaran Sirjan of the Iranian Basketball Super League.

== National team career ==
Dragović has been member of the Serbia U-16, U-18 and U-20 national teams, won the gold medal at the 2003 European U-16 Championship in Spain, won the gold medal at the 2005 European -18 Championship at Serbia, won the gold medal at the 2006 European U-20 Championship in Nova Gorica. Dragović was also a member of the team that represented Serbia at the 2011 Summer Universiade in Shenzhen, finishing as the gold medal winners.

== See also ==
- List of Serbian NBA Summer League players
