= Persepolis BC =

Basketball team based in Iran

- League: Iranian Basketball Super League
- Location: Tehran, Iran

Persepolis Basketball Club is an Iranian basketball club based in Tehran, Iran. In May 2006, the team did poorly in the Iranian Basketball Super League and was under financial pressure.

== See also ==
- Persepolis club
