= Meisam Mirzaei =

Iranian basketball player (born 1992)

No. 4 – Kalleh
- Position: Center
- League: IBSL

Personal information
- Born: 15 April 1992 (age 34) Tehran, Iran
- Listed height: 6 ft 10 in (2.08 m)

Career history
- 2012–2014: Azad University
- 2014–2016: Petrochimi Bandar Imam
- 2016–2017: Naft Abadan
- 2017–2020: Petrochimi Bandar Imam
- 2020–2021: Mahram Tehran
- 2021–2022: Shahrdari Gorgan
- 2022–present: Kalleh
Medals
Men's basketball
Representing Iran
Asian Games
| Silver medal – second place | 2018 Jakarta | Team |
FIBA Asia Cup
| Silver medal – second place | 2017 Lebanon |

Meisam Mirzaei Talarposhti (میثم میرزایی تَلارپُشتی, born 15 April 1992) is an Iranian basketball player for the Iranian national team.

He participated at the 2017 FIBA Asia Cup.
