= Arman Zangeneh =

Iranian basketball player

No. 12 – Tabiat Eslamshahr
- Position: Power forward
- League: Iranian super League

Personal information
- Born: June 15, 1993 (age 33) Tehran, Iran
- Listed height: 6 ft 8 in (2.03 m)
- Listed weight: 234 lb (106 kg)

Career information
- Playing career: 2010–present

Career history
- 2010–2011: Towzin Electric Kashan
- 2011–2012: Mahram Tehran
- 2012–2013: Hamyari Shahrdari Zanjan
- 2013–2015: Mahram Tehran
- 2015–2016: Petrochimi Bandar Imam
- 2017–2018: Naft Abadan
- 2018–2019: Chemidor Qom
- 2019–2021: Mahram Tehran
- 2021–2023: Zob Ahan Isfahan
- 2023–present: Tabiat Eslamshahr

Career highlights
- 2010 Summer Youth Olympics (participated); 2014 FIBA Basketball World Cup (participated); 2019 FIBA Basketball World Cup (participated); Iranian League Champion (2012) (2015) (2016); Iranian League Runner Up (2014) (2019) (2021)
Medals
Men's basketball
Representing Iran
Asian Games
Silver medal – second place	2014 Incheon	Team
Bronze medal – third place	2026 Aichi–Nagoya	Team
FIBA Asia Cup
Bronze medal – third place	2025 Jeddah
Asian Challenge
Gold medal – first place	2014 Wuhan
William Jones Cup
Silver medal – second place	2012 Taipei
WABA Champions Cup
Gold medal – first place	2012 Mahram
Gold medal – first place	2014 Mahram
Gold medal – first place	2016 Petrochimi
Gold medal – first place	2019 Chemidor

Arman Zangeneh (Persian: آرمان زنگنه, born June 15, 1993) is an Iranian professional basketball player.

He currently plays for Zob Ahan Isfahan BC in the Iranian Super League as well as for the Iranian national basketball team, as a power forward. He is 6 ft 8 in (203 cm) in height. He was a member of Iran 3x3 national basketball youth team attending in 2010 Summer Youth Olympics. He was introduced to national team in 2014 FIBA Asia Cup by Memi Bečirovič, and participated in the 2014 World Cup in Spain and 2019 World Cup in China with the Iranian national basketball team.
