= Arsalan Kazemi =

Iranian basketball player (born 1990)

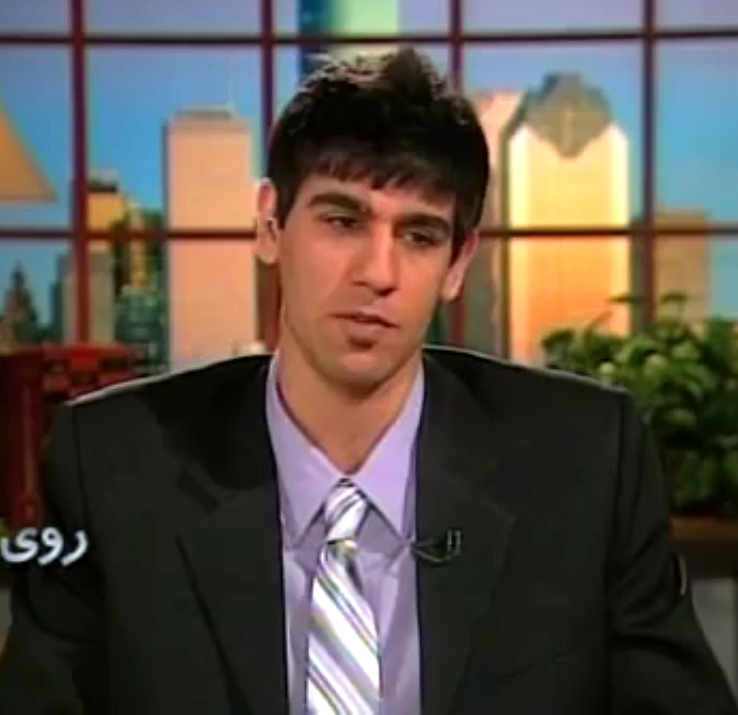

No. 14 – Shahrdari Gorgan
- Position: Power forward
- League: Iranian Basketball Super League; Basketball Champions League Asia; FIBA West Asia Super League

Personal information
- Born: 22 April 1990 (age 36) Isfahan, Iran
- Listed height: 6 ft 7 in (2.01 m)
- Listed weight: 226 lb (103 kg)

Career information
- High school: The Patterson School (Lenoir, North Carolina)
- College: Rice (2009–2012); Oregon (2012–2013)
- NBA draft: 2013: 2nd round, 54th overall pick
- Drafted by: Washington Wizards
- Playing career: 2013–present

Career history
- 2007–2008: Zob Ahan Isfahan
- 2013–2014: Petrochimi Bandar Imam
- 2014–2015: Chongqing Soaring Dragons
- 2015–2016: Samen Mash'had
- 2016–2017: Niroo Zamini (Army)
- 2017–2019: Petrochimi Bandar Imam
- 2019–2020: Mahram Tehran
- 2020–2021: Chemidor Qom
- 2021–2023: Zob Ahan Isfahan BC
- 2023–present: Shahrdari Gorgan

Career highlights
- Iranian League champion (2014); Pac-12 All-Defensive Team (2013); 2× Second-team All-C-USA (2011, 2012); USBWA Most Courageous Award (2011)
- Stats at Basketball Reference
Medals
Men's basketball
Representing Iran
FIBA Asia Cup
Silver medal – second place	2017 Beirut
Bronze medal – third place	2025 Jeddah
FIBA Asia Challenge
Gold medal – first place	2014 Wuhan
Gold medal – first place	2016 Tehran
Asian Games
Silver medal – second place	2018 Jakarta	Team
Bronze medal – third place	2026 Aichi–Nagoya	Team

Arsalan Kazemi Naeini (Persian: ارسلان کاظمی نائینی; born 22 April 1990) is an Iranian professional basketball player for Shahrdari Gorgan of the Iranian Basketball Super League. He played college basketball for the Oregon Ducks and the Rice Owls basketball teams. He was the 54th overall pick in the 2013 NBA draft by the Washington Wizards, becoming the first Iranian to be drafted into the league. His rights were later traded to the Philadelphia 76ers.

He was the captain of the Iranian under-18 national basketball team and has previously played for Zob Ahan Isfahan in the Iranian Basketball Super League at the age of 17 before travelling to the United States in February 2008.

== College career ==
=== Rice ===
Kazemi received scholarship offers from Maryland, Seton Hall, Oklahoma State, Missouri, Nebraska and Rice. On 1 November 2008, Kazemi committed to play for Rice University. He became the first Iranian national to play Division I basketball. He was a member of McMurtry College at Rice University.

==== Freshman ====
Kazemi averaged 10.3 ppg and 9.1 rpg in his first season at Rice. Kazemi was named in the Conference USA (C-USA) All-Freshman Team alongside HS teammate and current NBA player Hassan Whiteside.

==== Sophomore ====
As a sophomore Kazemi was picked by the league's coaches to the pre-season all C-USA 2nd team. Kazemi got off to a fast start averaging 17.5 points and 11.14 rebounds in the first 14 games of the season, before conference play started. He recorded nine total double double's in the first 14 games, which included a 26-point and 14-rebound game against Miami in the ACC and a 19-point and 17-rebound game against LSU in the SEC. In the weeks of 27 December 2010 and 3 January 2011 Kazemi was named C-USA player of the week becoming the first and only player to receive the honor two weeks in a row for the 2010–2011 season. Kazemi didn't miss a beat when entering conference play putting up a career high 28 points in the team's first conference game of the season against Tulane University on 5 January 2011. Kazemi would get another career high against Tulane, this time grabbing 19 rebounds on 2 February 2011. Kazemi finished conference play with 8 more double doubles. Some notable games included a 28-point 13-rebound game against Tulane, a 17-point 13-rebound game against University of Houston, a 21-point 16-rebound game against SMU, and a 24-point 18-rebound game against SMU again. Kazemi finished up C-USA play with 9 double doubles (including the conference tournament) and a conference average of 13.6 points and 10.9 rebounds. This brought his season total of double doubles to 18, which placed him in the top ten among all of active Div I players. His play in Conference USA earned him a spot on the All Conference 2nd team just as predicted in the pre-season. Kazemi averaged 15.2 points and 11 rebounds, having a total of 487 points, 120 offensive rebounds, 231 defensive rebounds making a grand total of 351 rebounds on the year.

The all-conference team was not Kazemi's only honor in the 2010–2011 season. To go along with his 2 time player of the week and all conference team, Kazemi was named to the all National Association of Basketball Coaches (NABC) all-district second team for district 11 along with Aaron Johnson from UAB and Will Barton from Memphis. Later Kazemi was named to the NCAA all-international first team that included Tristan Thompson from Texas and Nikola Vučević from USC. Kazemi made one more all-district team, this one being the United States Basketball Writers Association (USBWA) All-District VII team. The team also featured 2010 C-USA player of the year Randy Culpepper from UTEP, the Big 12's all-time leading scorer LaceDarius Dunn from Baylor, and Jordan Hamilton from Texas. Kazemi would be honored one more time by the USBWA. They gave him the 2010-2011 Most Courageous Award. Kazemi became the third recipient of the award. Dave Rose, the coach of BYU, and Kelvin Davis of San Diego State were the other two winners in years past.

=== Oregon ===
After his junior year, Kazemi transferred to the University of Oregon. He was granted a hardship waiver by the NCAA over Rice's objections, meaning that he could play immediately, without needing to sit out a year. Kazemi was granted a hardship waiver by the NCAA in light of alleged discrimination that he experienced while a member of the basketball team at Rice. According to Kazemi's application for a hardship waiver, Rice Athletic Director Rick Greenspan allegedly made derogatory remarks to Kazemi, his teammates, and an assistant coach, Marco Morcos. One of Kazemi's teammates, Omar Oraby, was granted a hardship waiver as well and was able to play for the University of Southern California immediately. Subsequently, Morcos was fired and has since filed a complaint with the Equal Employment Opportunity Commission alleging the existence of a hostile work environment at Rice, although Morcos has failed to produce any evidence of such treatment. Kazemi would not comment on the hardship waiver and Rice has categorically denied the allegations. The hardship waiver claims made by Kazemi and Oraby were not investigated by the NCAA, which granted the waivers over Rice's objections.

Kazemi had a successful senior season with Oregon, and averaged nearly a double-double in points and rebounds. He led the Ducks to the Sweet Sixteen of the NCAA men's basketball championships, in those 3 games he averaged 15 rebounds, 10 points, and 2.3 assists a game. The Ducks were knocked out by the eventual winners, the Louisville Cardinals.

=== College statistics ===
Year	Team	GP	GS	MPG	FG%	3P%	FT%	RPG	APG	SPG	BPG	PPG
2009–10	Rice	30	21	27.9	.530	.000	.610	9.1	1.2	1.6	0.9	10.3
2010–11	Rice	32	30	29.8	.525	.000	.720	11.0	1.3	1.2	0.8	15.2
2011–12	Rice	33	32	29.4	.594	.000	.681	10.3	2.1	2.1	1.0	12.1
2012–13	Oregon	35	27	28.8	.587	.000	.682	9.9	1.4	2.1	0.6	9.3

== Professional career ==
Kazemi was drafted by the Washington Wizards with the 54th pick in the 2013 NBA draft. His rights were later traded to the Philadelphia 76ers on draft night. Kazemi became the first Iranian-born player to be drafted by an NBA team. He joined the 76ers for the 2013 NBA Summer League where he averaged 4.6 points and 4.6 rebounds in five games. Despite showing potential during the summer league, Sixers General Manager Sam Hinkie said "He would get a chance to work on his game somewhere else for a year, then [we] would have the opportunity to reassess where he is later."

Kazemi returned to Iran for the 2013–14 season and signed with Petrochimi Bandar Imam.

In July 2014, Kazemi re-joined the 76ers for the 2014 NBA Summer League. In September 2014, he signed with the Chongqing Soaring Dragons of the Chinese Basketball Association. He appeared in 27 games for Chongqing and averaged 15.0 points and 13.7 rebounds per game.

In July 2015, Kazemi again re-joined the 76ers for the 2015 NBA Summer League, where he led the game against the Boston Celtics in rebounds. On 29 September 2015, he signed a training camp deal with the Atlanta Hawks after the 76ers renounced his draft rights. He was waived by the Hawks on 10 October after appearing in one preseason game. Two days later, he was claimed off waivers by the Houston Rockets and joined their team. He was waived by the Rockets on 24 October after appearing in one preseason game. On 29 December, he returned to his native Iran, signing with Samen Mash'had, reuniting with former Petrochimi Bandar Imam's coach Mehran Hatemi.

Kazemi spent the 2019–20 season with Mahram Tehran BC and averaged 9.6 points, 10.6 rebounds, 2.5 assists and 2.2 steals per game. On 7 September 2020, Kazemi signed with Chemidor Tehran BC.

He joined Shahrdari Gorgan for the 2023–24 season.

== International career ==
As captain of the Iranian under-19 team, Kazemi led the Iranian national team with 16.6PPG, 12.2RPG and 3 assists to become the team's highest scorer at the FIBA Under-19 World Championship 2009 in Auckland, New Zealand.

Kazemi was initially called up to the national senior team in August 2010 for the Stanković Cup, ahead of the much anticipated 2010 FIBA World Championship. Kazemi went on to be Iran's second leading scorer in the competition after Hamed Haddadi with an average of 12ppg, 7.4rpg and 2.8spg.

Following several impressive performances, Kazemi received much praise amongst international media. SLAM Magazine rated Kazemi as one of the top 5 NBA draft prospects competing in the tournament.

== Career statistics ==
Year	Team	GP	GS	MPG	FG%	3P%	FT%	RPG	APG	SPG	BPG	PPG
2013–14	Petrochimi	19	19	28.3	.591	.000	.576	11.1	1.5	2.2	0.7	13.1
2014–15	Beikong Fly Dragons	27	25	38.9	.661	.000	.583	13.7	3.4	3.2	0.3	15.0

== See also ==
- Iranian American
