= Aleksandar Ponjavić =

Serbian basketball player

Zlatibor
- Position: Shooting guard
- League: Basketball League of Serbia

Personal information
- Born: March 3, 1991 (age 35) Gornji Milanovac, SR Serbia, SFR Yugoslavia
- Listed height: 2.00 m (6 ft 7 in)
- Listed weight: 86 kg (190 lb)

Career information
- NBA draft: 2013: undrafted
- Playing career: 2009–present

Career history
- 2009–2010: FMP Reserves
- 2010–2011: Radnički Basket
- 2012–2014: Helios Domžale
- 2014–2015: Zlatarog Laško
- 2015–2016: Tajfun
- 2016–2017: Bourg-en-Bresse
- 2017–2018: Igokea
- 2018–2019: Naturtex-SZTE-Szedeák
- 2019–2020: Kaposvári
- 2020–2021: Avijeh Sanat Parsa Mashhad
- 2022: Borac Banja Luka
- 2022–present: Zlatibor

Career highlights
- France B League champion (2017); Bosnian Cup winner (2018)
Medals
Men's basketball
Representing Serbia
U18 European Championship
Gold medal – first place	2009 France	Team
U16 European Championship
Gold medal – first place	2007 Greece	Team

Aleksandar Ponjavić (born March 3, 1991) is a Serbian professional basketball player for Zlatibor the Basketball League of Serbia.
