= Sanaye Hormozgan BC =

Iranian professional basketball club

Sanaye Poshtiban Hormozgan
- Leagues: Iranian Super League
- Location: Bandar Abbas, Iran
- Team colors: Orange and Blue
- Website: –
Home	Away

Sanaye Hormozgan is an Iranian professional basketball club based in Bandar Abbas, Iran. They compete in the Iranian Basketball Super League.

== players ==
=== Notable players ===
- (Ukraine) Kyrylo Fesenko
- (United States) Darryl Bryant
