= Perry Petty =

American basketball player (born 1988)

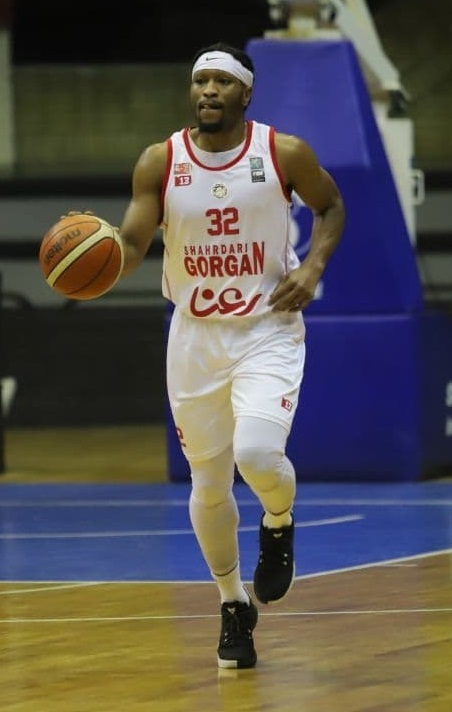
- Petty in Shahrdari Gorgan team(2020)

No. 00 – City Oilers
- Position: Point guard / shooting guard
- League: BAL

Personal information
- Born: August 5, 1988 (age 38) Milwaukee, Wisconsin
- Listed height: 6 ft 1 in (1.85 m)
- Listed weight: 189.2 lb (86 kg)

Career information
- High school: MacDowell Montessori (Milwaukee, Wisconsin)
- College: Allen CC (2006–2008); Santa Clara (2008–2009); Texas–Pan American (2010–2011)
- NBA draft: 2011: undrafted
- Playing career: 2011–present

Career history
- 2011: BK Vahostav-SK Zilina
- 2011: Reno Bighorns
- 2012: Central Illinois Drive
- 2012–2013: CSS Giurgiu
- 2013: Trotamundos
- 2013–2014: Tsmoki-Minsk
- 2014: VL Pesaro
- 2014: Virtus Roma
- 2014: Szolnoki Olaj
- 2014–2015: Al Mouttahed Tripoli
- 2015: Apollon Patras
- 2016–2017: Körmend
- 2017: Faros Larissas
- 2018: Dzūkija Alytus
- 2018–2023: Shahrdari Gorgan
- 2023: Al Ahly Benghazi
- 2023: City Oilers
- 2023–2024: Mahram Tehran
- 2024–2025: City Oilers
- 2025–present: Shahrdari Gorgan

Career highlights
- 3× Iranian Super League champion (2021–2023); Iranian Super League MVP (2019); Hungarian Cup winner (2016); PBL champion (2012); PBL MVP (2012); PBL Playoffs MVP (2012); All-PBL first team (2012)

Parish Perry Petty (born August 5, 1988) is an American professional basketball player who currently plays for the City Oilers. He played college basketball for Allen Community College, Santa Clara University and University of Texas–Pan American.

== High school career ==
Petty played high school basketball at MacDowell Montessori School in Milwaukee, Wisconsin. Petty gained all-conference and honorable mention all-region his senior year but team lost in the first round of the state playoffs his senior year and made it to the quarterfinals his junior year.

== College career ==
Petty played college basketball for Allen Community College, Santa Clara University and University of Texas–Pan American.

== Professional career ==
On August 3, 2017, Petty joined Faros Larissas of the Greek Basket League.

On November 2, 2018, he joined Shahrdari Gorgan of the Iranian Super League. On April 24, 2021, he forced the game 4 of Iranian Basketball Super League final to over time with a 3/4 court shot with 0.3 seconds to go which eventually they win the game 110-103 and became the champions for the first time.

In November 2023. Petty played for Ugandan champions City Oilers in the 2024 BAL qualification tournament. Petty helped the Oilers qualify for their second consecutive BAL.

After spending time in Iran with Mahram Tehran BC of the Iranian Basketball Super League, Petty returned to the City Oilers for a second stint in November 2024.
