= Zob Ahan Isfahan BC =

Zob Ahan Isfahan
- Leagues: Iranian Super League
- Founded: 1969; 57 years ago
- Arena: Hassan Rahnama Arena in Mellat Sport Complex
- Location: Isfahan, Iran
- Team colors: White and Green
- President: Khosro Ebrahimi
- Head coach: (Iran) Farzad Kouhian
- Championships: (7) Iranian Championships
- Website: www.zobahanclub.com
Home	Away

Zob Ahan Basketball Club (Persian: باشگاه بسکتبال ذوب‌آهن اصفهان, Bashgah-e Beskâtbal-e Zubâhen Esfehan) is an Iranian professional basketball club based in Isfahan, Iran. They compete in the Iranian Basketball Super League. Zob Ahan has won a record seven Iranian Super League championships.

It is sponsored by the Isfahan Steel Company, which also goes by the name Zob Ahan. Zob Ahan basketball team is the basketball club of the multisport Zob Ahan Cultural and Sport Club.

== Tournament records ==
=== Iranian Super League ===
- 1993–94: Champions
- 1994–95: Champions
- 1995–96: 2nd place
- 1996–97: Champions
- 1997–98: 2nd place
- 1998–99: Champions
- 1999–00: Champions
- 2000–01: Champions
- 2001–02: Champions
- 2003–04: 3rd place
- 2004–05: 3rd place
- 2005–06: 6th place
- 2006–07: 4th place
- 2007–08: 4th place
- 2008–09: 2nd place
- 2009–10: 2nd place
- 2010–11: 2nd place
- 2011–12: 6th place
- 2013–14: 4th place
- 2018–19: 5th place
- 2019–20: 9th place

=== WABA Champions Cup ===
- 1998: 3rd place
- 2000: 2nd place
- 2002: 4th place
- 2003: 3rd place
- 2010: 3rd place
- 2011: 4th place

=== Asian Champions Cup ===
- 1990: 4th place
- 1995: 7th place
- 1997: 8th place
- 2000: 7th place
- 2001: 9th place

== Players ==
=== Current roster ===
Note: Flags indicate national team eligibility at FIBA-sanctioned events. Players may hold other non-FIBA nationalities not displayed.

Zob Ahan Isfahan roster
Players
Coaches

Pos.	No.	Nat.	Name	Ht.
PG	5	(Iran)	Sajjad Mashayekhi	1.80 m (5 ft 11 in)
PG	6	(Iran)	Farid Aslani	1.83 m (6 ft 0 in)
PF	7	(Iran)	Mohammad Hassanzadeh	2.03 m (6 ft 8 in)
SG	8	(Iran)	Ali Kashani	1.86 m (6 ft 1 in)
G	11	(Iran)	Amir Gholizadeh	1.98 m (6 ft 6 in)
PF	12	(Iran)	Arman Zangeneh	2.03 m (6 ft 8 in)
F	14	(Iran)	Arsalan Kazemi	2.00 m (6 ft 7 in)
F	15	(Iran)	Hamid Ziaei	2.00 m (6 ft 7 in)
G/F	23	(Iran)	Mohammad Jafari	1.96 m (6 ft 5 in)
G/F	55	(Slovenia)	Blaž Mesiček	1.97 m (6 ft 6 in)
SF	99	(Iran)	Mohammad Reza Akbari	1.96 m (6 ft 5 in)

Head coach

- (Iran) Farzad Kouhian

Legend

- (C) Team captain
- Injured

== Notable former players ==
- (Iran) Farid Aslani
- (Iran) Reza Abdollahi
- (Iran) Hamed Afagh
- (Iran) Javad Davari
- (Iran) Arsalan Kazemi
- (Iran) Jaber Rouzbahani
- (Iran) Iman Zandi
- (Greece) Nestoras Kommatos
- (Lithuania) Tomas Nagys
- (Senegal) Ousmane Barro
- (Serbia) Petar Arsić
- (Montenegro) Slavko Vraneš
- (United States) Marlon Garnett
- (United States) Carlos Powell
