= Iranian Basketball Super League =

Iranian BasketbaII League

Iranian Basketball Super League (IBSL)
- Current season, competition or edition: 2025–26 Iranian Basketball Super League
- Sport: Basketball
- Founded: 1989; 1998 (current format)
- No. of teams: 12
- Country: Iran
- Continent: FIBA Asia (Asia)
- Most recent champion: Shahrdari Gorgan (4th title)
- Most titles: Zob Ahan (7 titles)
- Broadcaster: IRIB TV3 IRIB Varzesh IRIB Provincial Channels
- Feeder to: FIBA West Asia Super League
- Website: IranBasketball.org

The Iranian Basketball Super League (IBSL) is a professional men's basketball league in Iran. It was founded in 1998. The current champions is Shahrdari Gorgan. The league follows the promotion and relegation system in which the worst two teams are relegated to 1st Division.

== Current clubs ==
- Golnoor Isfahan
- Kalleh Mazandaran
- Mahgol Alborz
- Palayesh Naft Abadan
- Payesh Part Shahroud
- Petro Novin Mahshahr
- Shahrdari Gorgan
- Tabiat Eslamshahr
- Esteghlal Tehran
- Pas Kordestan
- Raad Padafand Isfahan
- Naft Zagros Jonoubi

== Valiahd Cup ==
The Valiahd Cup (Prince Cup) was the first Iranian basketball league where clubs from all around the country competed to win the title. This league was abandoned after the Iranian Revolution in 1979.

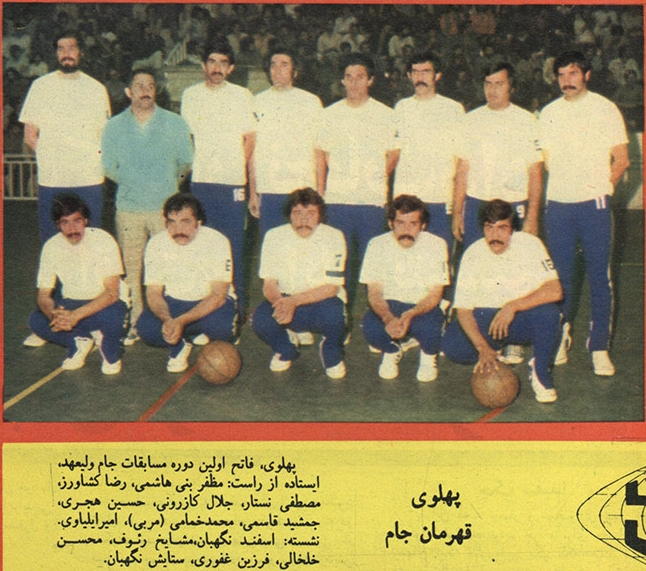
The picture of the Tehran Pahlavi team, the champion of the first Iranian men's club basketball league, the Prince Cup in 1975.

Season	Champion	Runner-up	Third place
1975	Pahlavi Tehran	Persepolis Gorgan	Pas Tehran
1976	Persepolis		Pas Tehran
1977	Dokhaniat Tehran	Irana Tehran	Sepahan Isfahan

== League champions ==
=== Division One ===
Season	Champion	Runner-up	Third place
1989–1990	Jandarmeri Tehran	Shahin Gorgan	
1991–1992	Shahrdari Isfahan	Shahrdari Gorgan	Gostaresh Tehran
1992–1993	Shahrdari Isfahan	Azad University Tehran	Etka Gorgan
1993–1994	Zob Ahan Isfahan	Bank Tejarat Tehran	Etka Gorgan
1994–1995	Zob Ahan Isfahan	Bank Tejarat Tehran	Etka Gorgan; Rah Ahan Tehran
1995–1996	Paykan Tehran	Zob Ahan Isfahan	Rah Ahan Tehran
1996–1997	Zob Ahan Isfahan	Paykan Tehran	Rah Ahan Tehran
1997–1998	Paykan Tehran	Zob Ahan Isfahan	Fath Tehran

=== Super League ===
Season	Champion	Runner-up	Third place
1998–1999	Zob Ahan Isfahan	Paykan Tehran	Fajr Sepah Tehran
1999–2000	Zob Ahan Isfahan	Paykan Tehran	Shahrdari Gorgan
2000–2001	Zob Ahan Isfahan	Foolad Mobarakeh Isfahan	Iran Nara Tehran
2001–2002	Zob Ahan Isfahan	Sanam Tehran	Paykan Tehran
2002–2003	Sanam Tehran	Iran Nara Tehran	Zob Ahan Isfahan
2003–2004	Saba Battery Tehran	Sanam Tehran	Zob Ahan Isfahan
2004–2005	Sanam Tehran	Saba Battery Tehran	Paykan Tehran
2005–2006	Saba Battery Tehran	Petrochimi Bandar Imam	Paykan Tehran
2006–2007	Saba Battery Tehran	Petrochimi Bandar Imam	Mahram Tehran
2007–2008	Mahram Tehran	Saba Battery Tehran	Kaveh Tehran
2008–2009	Mahram Tehran	Zob Ahan Isfahan	Saba Mehr Qazvin
2009–2010	Mahram Tehran	Zob Ahan Isfahan	Petrochimi Bandar Imam
2010–2011	Mahram Tehran	Zob Ahan Isfahan	Petrochimi Bandar Imam
2011–2012	Mahram Tehran	Petrochimi Bandar Imam	Foolad Mahan Isfahan
2012–2013	Petrochimi Bandar Imam	Mahram Tehran	Foolad Mahan Isfahan
2013–2014	Petrochimi Bandar Imam	Mahram Tehran	Azad University Tehran
2014–2015	Mahram Tehran	Petrochimi Bandar Imam	Azad University Tehran
2014–2015	Mahram Tehran	Azad University Tehran	Petrochimi Bandar Imam
2015–2016	Petrochimi Bandar Imam	Palayesh Naft Abadan	Chemidor Tehran
2016–2017	Petrochimi Bandar Imam	Palayesh Naft Abadan	Azad University Tehran
2017–2018	Shahrdari Tabriz	Mahram Tehran	Petrochimi Bandar Imam
2018–2019	Palayesh Naft Abadan	Shahrdari Gorgan	Chemidor Tehran; Petrochimi Bandar Imam
2019–2020	The league has been canceled due to COVID-19 pandemic		
2020–2021	Shahrdari Gorgan	Mahram Tehran	Chemidor Qom
2021–2022	Shahrdari Gorgan	Zob Ahan Isfahan	Chemidor Qom; Nazmavaran Sirjan
2022–2023	Shahrdari Gorgan	Kalleh Mazandaran	Palayesh Naft Abadan; Zob Ahan Isfahan
2023–2024	Tabiat Eslamshahr	Shahrdari Gorgan	Mahram Tehran; Zob Ahan Isfahan
2024–2025	Shahrdari Gorgan	Tabiat Eslamshahr	Kalleh Mazandaran; Palayesh Naft Abadan

== Titles by club ==
Team	Winners	Runners-Up	Years won	Years runner-up
Zob Ahan Isfahan	7	6	1994, 1995, 1997, 1999, 2000, 2001, 2002	1996, 1998, 2009, 2010, 2011, 2022
Mahram Tehran	6	4	2008, 2009, 2010, 2011, 2012, 2015	2013, 2014, 2018, 2021
Petrochimi Bandar Imam	4	3	2013, 2014, 2016, 2017	2006, 2007, 2012
Shahrdari Gorgan	4	3	2021, 2022, 2023, 2025	1992, 2019, 2024
Saba Battery Tehran	3	2	2004, 2006, 2007	2005, 2008
Paykan Tehran	2	3	1996, 1998	1997, 1999, 2000
Sanam Tehran	2	2	2003, 2005	2002, 2004
Shahrdari Isfahan	2	0	1992, 1993	
Palayesh Naft Abadan	1	2	2019	2016, 2017
Tabiat Eslamshahr	1	1	2024	2025
Jandarmeri Tehran	1	0	1990	–
Shahrdari Tabriz	1	0	2018	–

== Titles by city ==
City (Province)	Winners	Runners-up
Tehran (Tehran)	14	16
Isfahan (Isfahan)	9	7
Gorgan (Golestan)	4	3
Mahshahr (Khuzestan)	4	3
Abadan (Khuzestan)	1	2
Tabriz (East Azerbaijan)	1	0
Eslamshahr (Tehran)	1	1
Amol (Mazandaran)	0	1

== Notable foreign players ==
- (Bosnia and Herzegovina) Zlatko Jovanović
- (Bosnia and Herzegovina) Nedžad Sinanović
- (Bulgaria) Ibrahim Jaaber
- (Dominica) Garth Joseph
- (France) Makan Dioumassi
- (Georgia (country)) Nikoloz Tskitishvili
- (Greece) Nestoras Kommatos
- (Latvia) Kaspars Kambala
- (Lithuania) Marius Prekevičius
- (Mali) Soumaila Samake
- (Netherlands) Francisco Elson
- (New Zealand) Pero Cameron
- (Nigeria) Gabe Muoneke
- (Nigeria) Julius Nwosu
- (Nigeria) Ejike Ugboaja
- (Panama) Jaime Lloreda
- (Senegal) Cheikh Samb
- (Senegal) Pape Sow
- (Slovenia) Sani Bečirovič
- (Slovenia) Marko Milič
- (Spain) Óscar Yebra
- (United States) Torraye Braggs
- (United States) Ed Elisma
- (United States) Joseph Forte
- (United States) Marlon Garnett
- (United States) Mark Karcher
- (United States) Priest Lauderdale
- (United States) Art Long
- (United States) Tony Madison
- (United States) Lee Nailon
- (United States) Perry Petty
- (United States) Carlos Powell
- (United States) Andre Brown
- (United States) Jacob Pullen
- (United States) Alvin Sims
- (United States) Jabari Smith
- (United States) Daequan Cook
- (United States) Omar Sneed
- (United States) Jackson Vroman
- (United States) Robert Whaley
- (United States) Loren Woods
- (United States) DaJuan Summers
- (United States) Ike Diogu
- (United States) Dwight Buycks
- (United States) Russ Smith
- (United States) Jordan Hamilton
- (United States Virgin Islands) Kevin Sheppard
- (Uruguay) Leandro García
