= Shahrdari Gorgan BC =

Shahrdari Gorgan
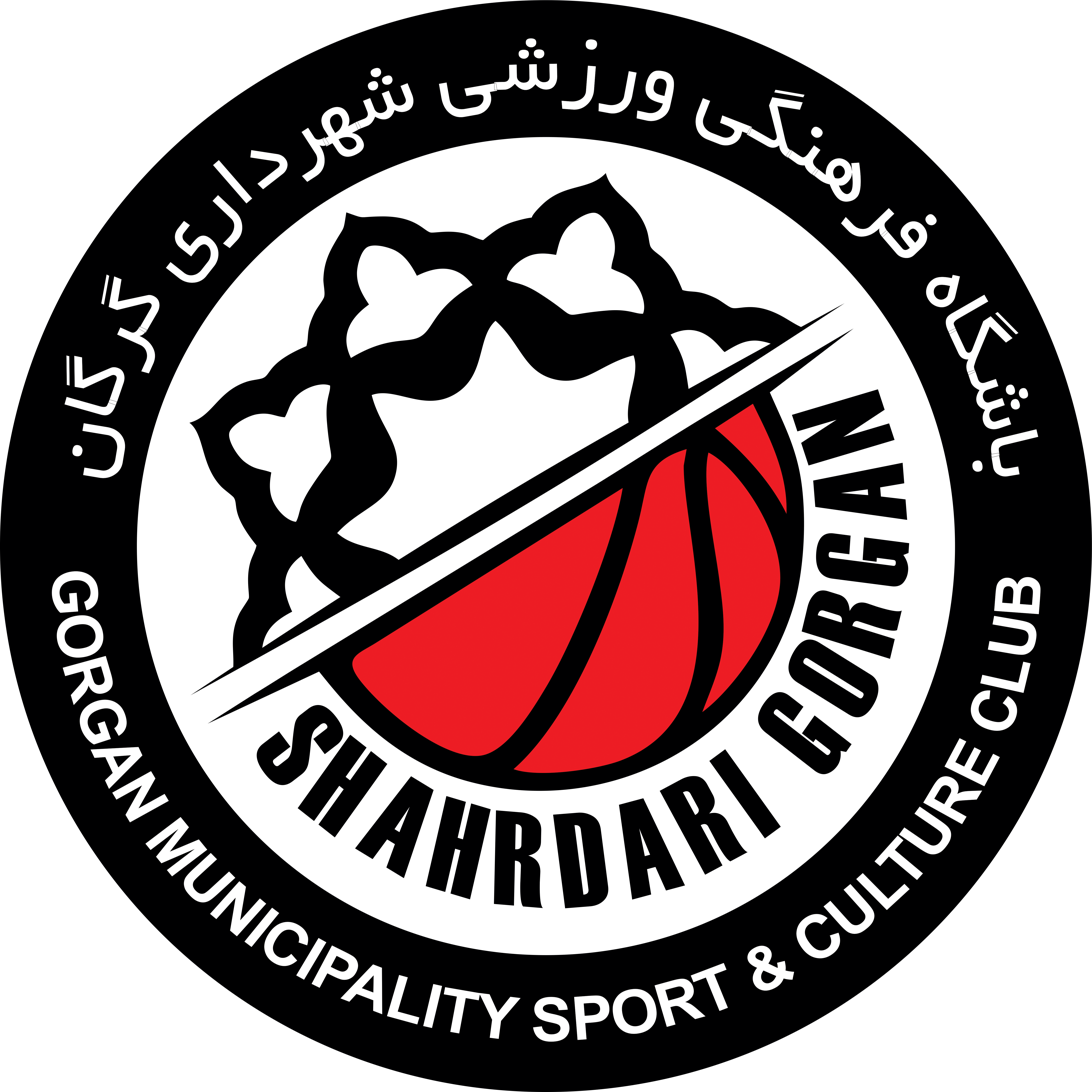
- Nickname: Eagles
- Leagues: Iranian Super League
- Founded: 1969; 57 years ago
- Arena: Imam Khomeini Hall
- Location: Gorgan, Iran
- Team colors: Red, white, black
- Head coach: Saleh Makhdomi
- Championships: 4 (2020-21, 2021-22, 2022-23, 2024-25)
Home	Away

Shahrdari Gorgan Basketball Club is a professional basketball club based in Gorgan, Iran. Established in 1969, they compete in the Iranian Basketball Super League and are nearly always in the title fight, winning multiple national championships in the past decade. In the 2022–23 season, Gorgan played in the West Asia Super League (WASL), and were runners-up in the West Asia division finals. The team plays their home games in the Gorgan Eagles Castle.

== Honours ==
Iranian Basketball Super League

- Champions (4): 2020-21, 2021-22, 2022-23, 2024–25

WASL West Asia League

- Runners-up (2): 2022–23, 2023–24

West Asia Super League

- Third Place (1): 2023–24

== Players ==
=== Current roster ===
Note: Flags indicate national team eligibility at FIBA-sanctioned events. Players may hold other non-FIBA nationalities not displayed.

Shahrdari Gorgan roster
Players
Coaches

Pos.	No.	Nat.	Name	Ht.
SG	1	(Iran)	Piter Girgoorian	2.01 m (6 ft 7 in)
C	4	(Iran)	Meisam Mirzaei (C)	2.07 m (6 ft 9 in)
PG	5	(Iran)	Mobin Sheikhi	1.75 m (5 ft 9 in)
PF	7	(Iran)	Mohammad Hassanzadeh	2.03 m (6 ft 8 in)
F	8	(Iran)	Amir Sedighi	2.03 m (6 ft 8 in)
G	9	(Iran)	Khashayar Aliakbari	1.86 m (6 ft 1 in)
F	12	(Iran)	Pedram Fakhfouri	1.95 m (6 ft 5 in)
SG	14	(Iran)	Nosratollah Yazarloo	1.97 m (6 ft 6 in)
SG	25	(United States)	Jordan Hamilton	2.01 m (6 ft 7 in)
G	32	(United States)	Perry Petty	1.87 m (6 ft 2 in)
F	88	(Iran)	Amirhossein Yazarloo	1.85 m (6 ft 1 in)

Head coach

- (Iran) Saleh Makhdomi

Legend

- (C) Team captain
- Injured

== Tournament records ==
=== Iranian Super League ===
- 2001–02: 9th place
- 2002–03: 5th place
- 2003–04: 7th place
- 2004–05: 9th place
- 2005–06: 12th place
- 2006–07: 5th place
- 2007–08: 6th place
- 2008–09: 8th place
- 2009–10: 8th place
- 2010–11: 7th place
- 2011–12: 8th place
- 2012–13: 4th place
- 2013–14: 9th place
- 2014–15: 4th place
- 2015–16: 7th place
- 2016–17: 9th place
- 2017–18: 8th place
- 2018–19: 2nd place
- 2019–20: Cancelled
- 2020–21: 1st place
- 2021–22: 1st place
- 2022–23: 1st place
- 2023–24: 2nd place
- 2024–25: 1st place
