= Palayesh Naft Abadan BC =

Palayesh Naft Abadan پالایش نفت آبادان Palâyesh-e Nuft-e Âbadan
- Leagues: Iranian Super League
- Founded: 2014; 12 years ago
- Arena: 17 shahrivar complex
- Location: Abadan, Iran
- Team colors: Yellow and Blue
- Website: –
Home	Away

Palayesh Naft Abadan Basketball Club is an Iranian professional basketball club based in Abadan, Iran. They compete in the Iranian Basketball Super League.

Sanat Naft made the final of the Iranian Super League in 2016, but were swept 4–0 by rivals Petrochimi.

Sana Naft wins his first title of the Iranian Super League in 2019, after beating 3-1 Shahrdari Gorgan BC.

== Roster ==
=== Male Team ===
Note: Flags indicate national team eligibility at FIBA-sanctioned events. Players may hold other non-FIBA nationalities not displayed.

Number	Player	Position'	Height (m)
4	(Iran) Mehrad Atashi	SG	1.91
5	(Bosnia and Herzegovina) Zlatko Jovanovic	PG	1.81
6	(Iran) Ashkan Khalilnejad	SF	1.91
2	(Iran) Hesam Rezai	SG	1.88
7	(Iran) Mohammad Hassanzadeh	PF	2.03
11	(Iran) Mohammad Bagher Ghamari	PF	1.95
12	(Iran) Arash Moradi		
14	(Serbia) Miljan Pupovic	C	2.10
15	(Iran) Mohammad Shahsavand	C	2.10
16	(Iran) Nima Ameripour		
17	(Iran) Ahmad Dashtimofared		
19	(Senegal) Abdoulaye N'Doye	C	2.13

Position	Name
Head Coach	(Iran) Hemad Sameri
Assistant Coach	(Iran) Amin Khishkar
