= 2007–08 Iranian Basketball Super League =

Locations of the 2007–08 season teams

The following is the final results of the Iran Super League 2007/08 basketball season.

== Regular season ==
=== Standings ===
Rank	Team	Pld	W	L	PF	PA	PD	Pts
1	Mahram Tehran	22	20	2	2016	1509	+507	42
2	Saba Battery Tehran	22	18	4	1895	1548	+347	40
3	Zob Ahan Isfahan	22	16	6	1793	1644	+149	38
4	Kaveh Tehran	22	15	7	1862	1699	+163	37
5	Pardis Mottahed Qazvin	22	13	9	1814	1808	+6	35
6	BEEM Mazandaran	22	12	10	1752	1732	+20	34
7	Petrochimi Bandar Imam	22	12	10	1726	1752	–26	34
8	Ararat Tehran	22	9	13	1723	1796	–73	31
9	Shahrdari Gorgan	22	7	15	1532	1661	–129	29
10	Gol Gohar Sirjan	22	5	17	1609	1890	–281	27
11	Azad University Tehran	22	4	18	1556	1788	–232	26
12	Heyat Basketball Shahrekord	22	1	21	1565	2016	–451	23

=== Results ===
	ARA	AZD	BEM	GOL	HBS	KAV	MAH	PAR	PET	SAB	GOR	ZOB
Ararat		81–80	81–75	89–83	118–82	89–71	69–91	87–92	81–85	67–80	77–68	73–93
Azad University	82–84		56–80	65–66	97–92	69–100	37–96	62–69	50–53	78–91	81–86	75–64
BEEM	94–84	81–83		89–60	101–72	85–84	63–92	82–74	92–85	88–82	80–70	63–65
Gol Gohar	77–86	100–93	83–96		101–73	74–86	59–103	93–101	95–84	59–113	77–78	65–69
HB Shahrekord	70–82	81–68	72–80	65–69		90–97	72–101	62–78	91–94	72–106	79–87	66–82
Kaveh	71–69	87–77	94–69	87–64	101–52		91–90	76–63	86–77	66–81	81–67	84–92
Mahram	84–64	106–71	101–75	90–59	90–44	71–58		100–78	84–63	92–78	108–83	83–87
Pardis	99–97	71–60	93–82	95–71	98–77	91–105	63–88		104–106	66–92	80–64	89–70
Petrochimi	75–64	83–88	72–69	89–63	85–69	76–83	77–94	77–66		77–76	68–63	79–97
Saba Battery	82–51	68–59	90–61	85–73	97–56	115–110	71–74	93–73	85–70		66–56	85–78
Shahrdari Gorgan	83–61	63–57	62–79	69–55	85–67	59–67	63–76	71–77	73–80	54–78		61–81
Zob Ahan	79–69	86–68	77–68	85–63	99–61	79–77	84–102	93–94	79–71	68–81	86–67	

== Playoffs ==
=== Championship ===
First round
Ararat	1
Shahrdari Gorgan	2
Pardis	1
HB Shahrekord	2
Petrochimi	2
Gol Gohar	1
BEEM	2
Azad University	0

Quarterfinals
Mahram	2
Shahrdari Gorgan	0
Kaveh	2
HB Shahrekord	0
Saba Battery	2
Petrochimi	0
Zob Ahan	2
BEEM	1

Semifinals
Mahram	3
Kaveh	0
Saba Battery	3
Zob Ahan	2

Final
Mahram	2
Saba Battery	0
Third place
Kaveh	2
Zob Ahan	0

==== 1st round ====
Team 1	Series	Team 2	1st	2nd	3rd
Ararat	1–2	Shahrdari Gorgan	69–66	67–92	61–77
Pardis	1–2	HB Shahrekord	86–83	78–90	78–84
Petrochimi	2–1	Gol Gohar	95–101	79–43	20–0
BEEM	2–0	Azad University	84–68	20–0	

==== Quarterfinals ====
Team 1	Series	Team 2	1st	2nd	3rd
Mahram	2–0	Shahrdari Gorgan	86–69	20–0	
Kaveh	2–0	HB Shahrekord	106–63	95–79	
Saba Battery	2–0	Petrochimi	71–61	94–74	
Zob Ahan	2–1	BEEM	83–86	86–69	74–73

==== Semifinals ====
Mahram vs. Kaveh

February 14
15:00

Kaveh	90–92	Mahram
Scoring by quarter: 15–25, 38–31, 18–21, 19–15
Pts: Sneed 30; Rebs: Sneed 12; Asts: Jones 7		Pts: Nikkhah 34; Rebs: Kamrani, Madison, Sohrabnejad, Nikkhah, Long 7 Asts: Madison 6

Azadi Basketball Hall, Tehran

February 16
17:00

Kaveh	98–102	Mahram
Scoring by quarter: 23–18, 29–29, 20–22, 26–33
Pts: Sneed 23; Rebs: Zarghi 9 Asts: Amini, Sneed 5		Pts: Nikkhah 27; Rebs: Long 18; Asts: Kamrani 7

Azadi Basketball Hall, Tehran

February 19
16:00

Mahram	93–80	Kaveh
Scoring by quarter: 29–22, 24–14, 22–20, 18–24
Pts: Nikkhah 23; Rebs: Sohrabnejad 12; Asts: Kamrani, Sohrabnejad 4		Pts: Sneed 27; Rebs: Sneed 14; Asts: Sneed, Jones 4

Azadi Basketball Hall, Tehran

Saba Battery vs. Zob Ahan

February 20
16:00

Zob Ahan	79–78	Saba Battery
Scoring by quarter: 21–23, 27–21, 17–19, 14–15
Pts: Cameron 29; Rebs: Sahakian 7 Asts: Cameron 5		Pts: Haddadi 17; Rebs: Haddadi 14; Asts: Dioumassi 5

Mellat Arena, Isfahan

February 22
16:00

Zob Ahan	64–72	Saba Battery
Scoring by quarter: 15–15, 5–22, 27–21, 17–14
Pts: Baheran 17; Rebs: Sahakian, Rouzbahani 6 Asts: Baheran 6		Pts: Joseph 22; Rebs: Haddadi 16; Asts: Afagh 4

Mellat Arena, Isfahan

February 24
15:00

Saba Battery	103–56	Zob Ahan
Scoring by quarter: 29–9, 19–22, 27–9, 28–16
Pts: Afagh 24; Rebs: Haddadi 13; Asts: Dioumassi 8		Pts: Akbari 10; Rebs: Arsić 6 Asts: Baheran 4

Azadi Basketball Hall, Tehran

February 26
15:00

Saba Battery	83–84	Zob Ahan
Scoring by quarter: 21–30, 23–21, 21–19, 18–14
Pts: Dioumassi 23; Rebs: Joseph 17; Asts: Haddadi 3		Pts: Baheran, Sahakian 22; Rebs: Rouzbahani 12; Asts: Baheran 6

Azadi Basketball Hall, Tehran

February 29
16:00

Saba Battery	88–80	Zob Ahan
Scoring by quarter: 19–20, 18–21, 23–19, 28–20
Pts: Haddadi 28; Rebs: Haddadi 24; Asts: Joseph, Ahmadian, Tabeshnia 3		Pts: Cameron 17; Rebs: Rouzbahani 7 Asts: Cameron 5

Azadi Basketball Hall, Tehran

==== 3rd place match ====
March 3

Kaveh	103–94	Zob Ahan

Azadi Basketball Hall, Tehran

March 5

Zob Ahan	52–74	Kaveh

Mellat Arena, Isfahan

==== Final ====
March 3
18:00

Mahram	101–93	Saba Battery
Scoring by quarter: 33–22, 30–25, 23–20, 15–26
Pts: Nikkhah 26; Rebs: Nikkhah 7 Asts: Kamrani 7		Pts: Haddadi 28; Rebs: Haddadi 10; Asts: Jamshidvand, Afagh, Joseph, Ahmadian, Tabeshnia 2

Azadi Basketball Hall, Tehran

March 5
16:00

Saba Battery	93–106	Mahram
Scoring by quarter: 25–20, 25–32, 16–29, 27–25
Pts: Afagh, Joseph 14; Rebs: Kardoust 7 Asts: Dioumassi 7		Pts: Madison 24; Rebs: Madison, Long 8 Asts: Kamrani 6

Azadi Basketball Hall, Tehran

=== Classification 5th–8th ===
Classification 5th–8th
Shahrdari Gorgan	2
HB Shahrekord	0
Petrochimi
BEEM	WD

5th place
Tehran
Shahrdari Gorgan	69
Petrochimi	97
7th place
HB Shahrekord
BEEM	WD

Team 1	Series	Team 2	1st	2nd	3rd
Shahrdari Gorgan	2–0	HB Shahrekord	83–77	72–49	
Petrochimi	w/o	BEEM			

=== Classification 9th–12th ===
All matches in Azadi Basketball Hall, Tehran.

Team 1	Score	Team 2
Pardis	78–70	Gol Gohar
Ararat	91–74	Azad University
Gol Gohar	75–81	Ararat
Azad University	70–82	Pardis
Gol Gohar	83–93	Azad University
Pardis	70–74	Ararat

Rank	Team	Pld	W	L	Pts
9	Ararat	3	3	0	6
10	Pardis	3	2	1	5
11	Azad University	3	1	2	4
12	Gol Gohar	3	0	3	3

== Final standings ==
Rank	Team	Qualification or relegation
1	Mahram Tehran	2009 WABA Champions Cup
2	Saba Battery Tehran	2009 WABA Champions Cup
3	Kaveh Tehran	
4	Zob Ahan Isfahan	
5	Petrochimi Bandar Imam	
6	Shahrdari Gorgan	
7	Heyat Basketball Shahrekord	
8	BEEM Mazandaran	
9	Ararat Tehran	
10	Pardis Mottahed Qazvin	
11	Azad University Tehran	Relegation to the first division
12	Gol Gohar Sirjan	Relegation to the first division
