= 2001–02 Iranian Basketball Super League =

The following is the final results of the Iran Super League 2001/02 basketball season.

== Regular season ==
=== Group A ===
| Rank | Team |
|---|---|
| 1 | Sanam Tehran |
| 2 | Simin Sepahan Isfahan |
| 3 | Homa Tehran |
| 4 | PAS Tehran |
| 5 | Petrochimi Bandar Imam |
| 6 | Tarbiat Badani Fars |

=== Group B ===
| Rank | Team |
|---|---|
| 1 | Zob Ahan Isfahan |
| 2 | Paykan Tehran |
| 3 | Iran Nara Tehran |
| 4 | Farsh Mashhad |
| 5 | Shahrdari Gorgan |
| 6 | Rah Ahan Tehran |

== Playoffs ==
=== Championship ===
Quarter-finals
Sanam | 2
Farsh | 0
Homa | 0
Paykan | 2
Simin Sepahan | 2
Iran Nara | 0
PAS | 0
Zob Ahan | 2

Semi-finals
Sanam | 2
Paykan | 1
Simin Sepahan | 0
Zob Ahan | 2

Final
Sanam | 0
Zob Ahan | 2
3rd place
Paykan | 2
Simin Sepahan | 0

=== Classification 5th–8th ===
5th–8th places
Farsh | 2
Homa | 1
Iran Nara | 2
PAS | 0

5th place
Farsh | 0
Iran Nara | 2
7th place
Homa | 2
PAS | 0

=== Classification 9th–12th ===
| Rank | Team |
|---|---|
| 9 | Shahrdari Gorgan |
| 10 | Petrochimi Bandar Imam |
| 11 | Rah Ahan Tehran |
| 12 | Tarbiat Badani Fars |

== Final standing ==
| Rank | Team |
|---|---|
| 1 | Zob Ahan Isfahan |
| 2 | Sanam Tehran |
| 3 | Paykan Tehran |
| 4 | Simin Sepahan Isfahan |
| 5 | Iran Nara Tehran |
| 6 | Farsh Mashhad |
| 7 | Homa Tehran |
| 8 | PAS Tehran |
| 9 | Shahrdari Gorgan |
| 10 | Petrochimi Bandar Imam |
| 11 | Rah Ahan Tehran |
| 12 | Tarbiat Badani Fars |

- Zob Ahan and Sanam qualified to WABA Champions Cup 2003.
- Rah Ahan and TB Fars relegated to Division 1.
