= Amir Amini (basketball) =

Iranian professional basketball player

Personal information
- Born: June 10, 1984 (age 42) Tehran, Iran
- Listed height: 6 ft 3 in (1.91 m)
- Listed weight: 183 lb (83 kg)

Career information
- Playing career: 2003–2017
- Position: Point guard

Career history
- 2003–2007: Paykan
- 2007–2008: Kaveh
- 2008–2009: Azad University Tehran
- 2009–2012: Petrochimi Imam Harbour Bandar
- 2012–2013: Foolad Sepahan Tehran
- 2013–2014: Sanaye Petrochimi Mahshahr
- 2014–2015: Petrochimi Bandar Imam Harbour
- 2016–2017: Chemidor
Medals
Men's basketball
Representing Iran
Asian Games
Bronze medal – third place	2006 Doha	Team
Bronze medal – third place	2010 Guangzhou	Team
Asian Championship
Gold medal – first place	2007 Tokushima	Team
Gold medal – first place	2009 Tianjin	Team

Amir Amini (Persian: امیر امینی, born June 10, 1984) is an Iranian former professional basketball player. He was also a member of the Iranian national basketball team.

== Early life ==
Amini was born in Tehran, Iran on June 10, 1984.

== Professional career ==
Amini began his professional career playing for Peykan Tehran in the Iran Basketball Superleague from 2003-2007.

From 2007 to 2008, he played for Kaveh Tehran in the Iran Superleague.

From 2008 to 2009, Amini played for Azad University Tehran.

From 2009 to 2012, he played for Petrochimi Imam Harbour Bandar.

From 2012 to 2013, Amini played for Foolad Sepahan Tehran (Sepahan S.C.).

From 2013 to 2014, he played for Sanaye Petrochimi Mahshahr.

From 2014 to 2015, Amini played for Petrochimi Bandar Imam Harbour.

From 2016 to 2017, Amini played for Chemidor Tehran.

== National team career ==
Amini competed for the Iran men's national basketball team, winning a bronze medal at the 2006 Asian Games in Qatar, gold medal at 2007 FIBA Asia Championship in Japan, gold medal at 2009 FIBA Asia Championship in China, and bronze medal at 2010 Asian Games in China.

In his youth, he won a gold medal at the 2001 West Asian Youth Championship in Yemen, silver medal at the 2002 ABC Under-18 Championship in Kuwait, gold medal at 2004 FIBA Asia Under-20 Championship in Tehran.

He participated in the 2008 Summer Olympics in China, representing Iran.

== Honours ==
=== National team ===
- Asian Championship
  - Gold medal: 2007, 2009
- Asian Games
  - Bronze medal: 2006, 2010
- Asian Under-20 Championship
  - Gold medal: 2004
- Asian Under-18 Championship
  - Silver medal: 2002
- Islamic Solidarity Games
  - Bronze medal: 2005
