= Mousa Nabipour =

Iranian basketball player (born 1983)

Personal information
- Born: August 14, 1983 (age 43) Behshahr, Iran
- Listed height: 6 ft 11 in (2.11 m)
- Listed weight: 231 lb (105 kg)

Career information
- Playing career: 2001–2021
- Position: Center

Career history
- 2001–2006: Sanam
- 2006–2007: Shahrdari Gorgan
- 2007–2008: Kaveh
- 2008–2009: BEEM
- 2009–2013: Azad University
- 2013–2015: Mahram
- 2015–2018: Petrochimi
- 2018–2019: Naft Abadan
- 2020–2021: Ayandeh Sazan

Mousa Nabipour
Medal record

Men's basketball

Representing Iran

Asian Games
Bronze medal – third place	2006 Doha	Team

Asian Championship
Gold medal – first place	2007 Tokushima	Team

Mousa Nabipour (Persian: موسی نبی پور, born August 14, 1983, in Behshahr) is an Iranian former professional basketball player. He is 6'11" in height. He was also a member of the Iranian national basketball team that won the FIBA Asia Championship 2007, and he competed at the 2008 Olympic basketball Tournament.

== Honours ==
=== National team ===
- Asian Championship
  - Gold medal: 2007
- Asian Games
  - Bronze medal: 2006

=== Club ===
- Iranian Super League
  - Champions: 2003, 2005 (Sanam)
