= 1996 ABC Under-22 Championship =

1996 FIBA Asia U-20 Championship
2nd Asian Basketball Championship

Tournament details
- Host country: China
- Dates: November 1–9
- Teams: 16
- Venue(s): 2 (in 1 host city)

Final positions
- Champions: South Korea (1st title)

The ABC Under-22 Championship 1996 is the 2nd edition of the ABC's championship for young men basketball. The games were held at Shanghai from November 1–9, 1996.

== Preliminary round ==
=== Group A ===
Team	Pld	W	L	PF	PA	PD	Pts
China	3	3	0	307	172	+135	6
Chinese Taipei	3	2	1	298	224	+74	5
Thailand	3	1	2	208	251	−43	4
Macau	3	0	3	160	326	−166	3

November 1

Chinese Taipei	98–60	Thailand
Scoring by half: 43–31, 55–29

Shanghai

November 1

China	110–40	Macau
Scoring by half: 59–25, 51–15

Shanghai

November 2

Macau	61–118	Chinese Taipei
Scoring by half: 29–58, 32–60

Shanghai

November 2

Thailand	50–94	China
Scoring by half: 33–48, 17–46

Shanghai

November 3

Thailand	98–59	Macau
Scoring by half: 48–35, 50–24

Shanghai

November 3

China	103–82	Chinese Taipei
Scoring by half: 44–38, 59–44

Shanghai

=== Group B ===
Team	Pld	W	L	PF	PA	PD	Pts
South Korea	3	3	0	341	197	+144	6
Saudi Arabia	3	2	1	253	216	+37	5
Malaysia	3	1	2	163	230	−67	4
India	3	0	3	225	339	−114	3

November 1

South Korea	152–83	India
Scoring by half: 72–40, 80–43

Shanghai

November 1

Saudi Arabia	71–44	Malaysia
Scoring by half: 40–21, 31–23

Shanghai

November 2

Malaysia	48–92	South Korea
Scoring by half: 28–41, 20–51

Shanghai

November 2

India	75–116	Saudi Arabia
Scoring by half: 45–64, 30–52

Shanghai

November 3

Malaysia	71–67	India
Scoring by half: 43–30, 28–37

Shanghai

November 3

South Korea	97–66	Saudi Arabia
Scoring by half: 44–30, 53–36

Shanghai

=== Group C ===
Team	Pld	W	L	PF	PA	PD	Pts
Japan	3	3	0	230	200	+30	6
Iran	3	2	1	199	193	+6	5
Kyrgyzstan	3	1	2	204	212	−8	4
Hong Kong	3	0	3	176	204	−28	3

November 1

Kyrgyzstan	57–60	Iran
Scoring by half: 33–39, 24–21

Shanghai

November 1

Japan	66–52	Hong Kong
Scoring by half: 28–26, 38–26

Shanghai

November 2

Iran	65–71	Japan
Scoring by half: 39–33, 26–38

Shanghai

November 2

Hong Kong	59–64	Kyrgyzstan
Scoring by half: 29–37, 30–27

Shanghai

November 3

Iran	74–65	Hong Kong
Scoring by half: 41–36, 33–29

Shanghai

November 3

Japan	93–83	Kyrgyzstan
Scoring by half: 36–41, 57–42

Shanghai

=== Group D ===
Team	Pld	W	L	PF	PA	PD	Pts
Kazakhstan	3	3	0	217	156	+61	6
Philippines	3	2	1	196	172	+24	5
Kuwait	3	1	2	156	190	−34	4
Indonesia	3	0	3	143	194	−51	3

November 1

Kuwait	33–73	Kazakhstan
Scoring by half: 19–41, 14–32

Shanghai

November 1

Philippines	59–40	Indonesia
Scoring by half: 27–21, 32–19

Shanghai

November 2

Indonesia	43–59	Kuwait
Scoring by half: 24–24, 19–35

Shanghai

November 2

Kazakhstan	68–63	Philippines
Scoring by half: 35–30, 33–33

Shanghai

November 3

Kazakhstan	76–60	Indonesia
Scoring by half: 31–33, 45–27

Shanghai

November 3

Philippines	74–64	Kuwait
Scoring by half: 34–26, 40–38

Shanghai

== Quarterfinals ==
=== Group I ===
Team	Pld	W	L	PF	PA	PD	Pts
China	3	3	0	271	223	+48	6
Saudi Arabia	3	2	1	245	231	+14	5
Philippines	3	1	2	228	257	−29	4
Japan	3	0	3	229	262	−33	3

November 5

China	86–64	Philippines
Scoring by half: 43–23, 43–41

Shanghai

November 5

Japan	67–77	Saudi Arabia
Scoring by half: 34–45, 33–32

Shanghai

November 6

Saudi Arabia	83–93	China
Scoring by half: 43–47, 40–46

Shanghai

November 6

Philippines	93–86	Japan
Scoring by half: 44–39, 49–47

Shanghai

November 7

Saudi Arabia	85–71	Philippines
Scoring by half: 48–34, 37–37

Shanghai

November 7

China	92–76	Japan
Scoring by half: 55–38, 37–38

Shanghai

=== Group II ===
Team	Pld	W	L	PF	PA	PD	Pts
South Korea	3	3	0	311	236	+75	6
Kazakhstan	3	2	1	246	228	+18	5
Chinese Taipei	3	1	2	250	275	−25	4
Iran	3	0	3	214	282	−68	3

November 5

Chinese Taipei	76–83	Kazakhstan
Scoring by half: 32–28, 44–55

Shanghai

November 5

Iran	72–109	South Korea
Scoring by half: 34–59, 38–50

Shanghai

November 6

South Korea	114–94	Chinese Taipei
Scoring by half: 58–45, 56–49

Shanghai

November 6

Kazakhstan	93–64	Iran
Scoring by half: 45–32, 48–32

Shanghai

November 7

Chinese Taipei	80–78 (OT)	Iran
Scoring by half: 38–30, 31–39 Overtime: 11–9

Shanghai

November 7

South Korea	88–70	Kazakhstan
Scoring by half: 51–35, 37–35

Shanghai

=== Group III ===
Team	Pld	W	L	PF	PA	PD	Pts	Tiebreaker
Thailand	3	3	0	272	223	+49	6	
Indonesia	3	1	2	202	222	−20	4	1–1 / 1.065
Kyrgyzstan	2	1	2	247	254	−7	4	1–1 / 1.019
India	3	1	2	257	279	−22	4	1–1 / 0.934

November 5

Thailand	84–55	Indonesia
Scoring by half: 37–24, 47–31

Shanghai

November 5

Kyrgyzstan	95–103	India
Scoring by half: 37–47, 58–56

Shanghai

November 6

India	86–96	Thailand
Scoring by half: 51–49, 35–47

Shanghai

November 6

Indonesia	59–70	Kyrgyzstan
Scoring by half: 17–32, 42–38

Shanghai

November 7

Indonesia	88–68	India
Scoring by half: 59–25, 29–43

Shanghai

November 7

Thailand	92–82	Kyrgyzstan
Scoring by half: 41–35, 51–47

Shanghai

=== Group IV ===
Team	Pld	W	L	PF	PA	PD	Pts
Kuwait	3	3	0	250	193	+57	6
Hong Kong	3	2	1	194	183	+11	5
Malaysia	3	1	2	206	207	−1	4
Macau	3	0	3	176	243	−67	3

November 5

Macau	54–93	Kuwait
Scoring by half: 31–50, 23–43

Shanghai

November 5

Hong Kong	60–51	Malaysia
Scoring by half: 34–24, 26–27

Shanghai

November 6

Malaysia	84–64	Macau
Scoring by half: 41–37, 43–27

Shanghai

November 6

Kuwait	74–68	Hong Kong
Scoring by half: 34–34, 40–34

Shanghai

November 7

Kuwait	83–71	Malaysia
Scoring by half: 47–38, 36–33

Shanghai

November 7

Macau	58–66	Hong Kong
Scoring by half: 21–38, 37–28

Shanghai

== Classification 5th–16th ==
=== 15th place ===
November 8

India	96–106	Macau
Scoring by half: 48–50, 48–56

Shanghai

=== 13th place ===
November 8

Kyrgyzstan	65–72	Malaysia
Scoring by half: 29–33, 36–39

Shanghai

=== 11th place ===
November 8

Indonesia	78–83 (OT)	Hong Kong
Scoring by half: 38–39, 36–35 Overtime: 4–9

Shanghai

=== 9th place ===
November 8

Thailand	82–72	Kuwait
Scoring by half: 46–34, 36–38

Shanghai

=== 7th place ===
November 9

Japan	86–79	Iran
Scoring by half: 43–49, 43–30

Shanghai

=== 5th place ===
November 9

Philippines	95–92	Chinese Taipei
Scoring by half: 53–49, 42–43

Shanghai

== Final round ==
Semifinals
November 8
China	76
Kazakhstan	67
November 8
Saudi Arabia	70
South Korea	103

Final
November 9
China	71
South Korea	79
3rd place
November 9
Kazakhstan	54
Saudi Arabia	68

=== Semifinals ===
November 8

China	76–67	Kazakhstan
Scoring by half: 32–30, 44–37

Shanghai

November 8

Saudi Arabia	70–103	South Korea
Scoring by half: 23–50, 47–53

Shanghai

=== 3rd place ===
November 9

Kazakhstan	54–68	Saudi Arabia
Scoring by half: 28–38, 26–30

Shanghai

=== Final ===
November 9

China	71–79	South Korea
Scoring by half: 34–29, 37–50

Shanghai

== Final standing ==
Qualified for the 1997 FIBA Under-22 World Championship

Rank	Team	Record
1st place, gold medalist(s)	South Korea	8–0
2nd place, silver medalist(s)	China	7–1
3rd place, bronze medalist(s)	Saudi Arabia	5–3
4	Kazakhstan	5–3
5	Philippines	4–3
6	Chinese Taipei	3–4
7	Japan	4–3
8	Iran	2–5
9	Thailand	5–2
10	Kuwait	4–3
11	Hong Kong	3–4
12	Indonesia	1–6
13	Malaysia	3–4
14	Kyrgyzstan	2–5
15	Macau	1–6
16	India	1–6

== Awards ==
1996 Asian Under-22 champions

South Korea
First title
