= Kimia Yazdian =

Iranian basketball player

Kimiya Yazdian
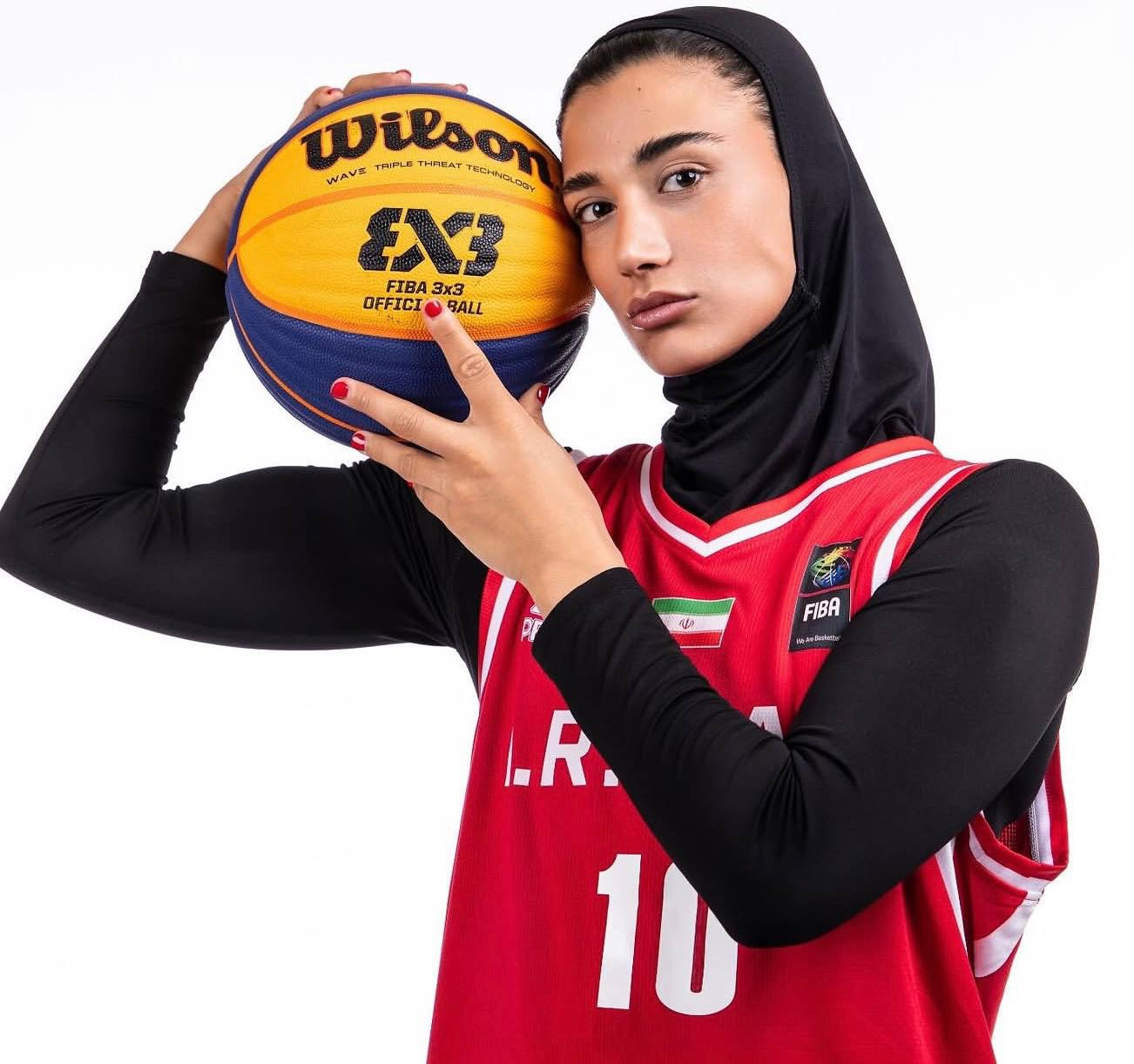

No. 10 – Esteghlal Woman's Basketball Team
- Position: Small forward Power forward
- League: Iranian Women's Basketball League

Personal information
- Born: 13 July 1996 (age 30) Tehran, Iran
- Listed height: 180 cm (5 ft 11 in)

Career information
- Playing career: 2005–present

Kimiya Yazdian Tehrani (Persian: کیمیا یزدیان طهرانی, born July 13, 1996) is an Iranian Basketball player for (Pishro women's Basketball team) and Iran women's national basketball team and Iran women's national 3x3 team.

She participated at the 18th Asian Games in Jakarta–Palembang, 2018 FIBA 3x3 World Cup and 2019 FIBA 3x3 World Cup – Women's tournament in the Netherlands. Kimiya Yazdian Tehrani is also known as the first Iranian female basketball player legionnaire. She is also known as the most decorated player in the Iranian Women's Basketball Premier League. Her last championship was with Esteghlal Club in the 2025–2026 season in the Iran Premier Basketball League.

== Biography ==
Kimia Yazdian Tehrani began playing basketball at the age of 10 through her school and was invited to the Iran U16 National Team training camp at the age of 13. Throughout her career, she has represented Iran at the youth, junior, and senior national team levels and is recognized as one of the country's most prominent women's 3×3 basketball players. She is also recognized as the first Iranian woman basketball player to compete professionally abroad.

She started her club career with Sardaran Karaj before joining Rah Ahan upon the recommendation of Pouran and Parvaneh Abbasi. Throughout her professional career, she has played for several clubs in the Iranian Women's Basketball Premier League, including Koosha, Bahman Group, Shahrdari Gorgan, and Sahar Academy, and currently plays for Esteghlal.

With Koosha, Yazdian Tehrani won the Iranian Women's Basketball League championship and was named the league's Best Young Player (Rookie of the Year) in 2018. She has also won 13 Iranian National Championship titles in the youth and junior categories with the Tehran provincial team.

At the international level, she has been a regular member of the Iran Women's National 3×3 Basketball Team and won a bronze medal at the West Asia Championship. She also earned a bronze medal at the FISU World University Championship with the Iranian university team. This achievement is recognized as the first team world medal in the history of Iranian women's sports.

Yazdian Tehrani has also played professionally outside Iran, competing in the Qatar Basketball League as an international player.

Alongside her professional playing career, she has been actively involved in coaching youth basketball, mentoring and developing young athletes, many of whom have gone on to earn invitations to Iran's national team training camps.

== Achievements and Honors of Kimia Yazdian Tehrani ==
=== Club Achievements ===
Throughout her professional career, Kimia Yazdian Tehrani has won numerous titles with some of the top women's basketball clubs in Iran, including:

- Champion of the Iranian Women's Basketball Super League with Koosha Sepehr Sabalan.
- Runner-up of the Iranian Women's Basketball Super League with Koosha Sepehr Sabalan.
- Iranian Women's Basketball League Champion with Shimidar.
- Multiple-time Iranian Women's Basketball League Champion with Bahman Group.
- Multiple-time Iranian Women's Basketball League Runner-up with Bahman Group.
- Third Place in the Iranian Women's Basketball League with Nikan Tarabar.
- Iranian Women's Basketball League Champion with Esteghlal Tehran.

=== National Team and International Achievements ===
Kimia Yazdian Tehrani has represented Iran at both the senior women's national basketball team and the national 3×3 basketball team in numerous international competitions.

Her major achievements include:

- Member of the Iran Women's National Basketball Team.
- Member of the Iran Women's National 3×3 Basketball Team.
- Silver Medalist at the Asian University 3×3 Basketball Championship.
- Bronze Medalist at the FISU World University Championship.
- Silver Medalist at the FIBA Asia Division B Championship.
- Champion of the West Asia Basketball Championship.
- Runner-up at the Asian Women's Club Championship.

==== International Competitions ====
- 2018 Asian Games (Jakarta).
- 2018 FIBA 3×3 Basketball World Cup.
- 2019 FIBA 3×3 Basketball World Cup.
- Participation in five editions of the FIBA 3×3 World Championships.
- Represented Iran in West Asian and Asian Division competitions.

=== Individual Honors ===
- Selected as one of the top players of the Iranian Women's Basketball Super League (approximately 2018).

== Coaching and Educational Career ==
Kimia Yazdian Tehrani is the founder, director, and head coach of KYT Academy, a basketball academy dedicated to developing young talents and professional athletes for national and international competition.

She also organizes basketball camps, tournaments, and educational events. In addition, she is recognized as one of the pioneers in the development and promotion of 3×3 basketball in Iran.

Instagram: @kyt.academy

== International Professional Career ==
Kimia Yazdian Tehrani is recognized as the first Iranian woman basketball player to play professionally abroad. She competed in the Qatar Basketball League, representing clubs in Qatar and becoming the first Iranian female basketball player to establish a professional international playing career.
