= 2008–09 Iranian Basketball Super League =

Locations of the 2008–09 season teams

The following is the final results of the Iran Super League 2008/09 basketball season, Persian Gulf Cup.

== Regular season ==
=== Standings ===
Rank	Team	Pld	W	L	PF	PA	PD	Pts
1	Saba Mehr Tehran	24	21	3	2098	1778	+320	45
2	Petrochimi Bandar Imam	24	21	3	1985	1606	+379	45
3	Mahram Tehran	24	19	5	2075	1808	+267	43
4	Zob Ahan Isfahan	24	18	6	1971	1686	+285	42
5	BEEM Mazandaran	24	13	11	1906	1836	+70	37
6	Louleh Sabz a.s Shiraz	24	11	13	2005	2022	−17	35
7	Tractorsazi Kordestan	24	11	13	1937	1987	−50	35
8	Shahrdari Gorgan	24	11	13	1947	2050	−103	35
9	Azad University Tehran	24	10	14	1939	1940	−1	34
10	Ararat Tehran	24	7	17	1886	2090	−204	31
11	Heyat Basketball Langaroud	24	7	17	1768	1997	−229	31
12	Heyat Basketball Shahrekord	24	7	17	1889	2143	−254	31
13	Heyat Basketball Khorasan Razavi	24	0	24	1726	2189	−463	24

- In April 2009 Saba Mehr transferred from Tehran to Qazvin.

=== Results ===
	ARA	AZD	BEM	HBK	HBL	HBS	LAS	MAH	PET	SAB	GOR	TRC	ZOB
Ararat		87–93	70–77	60–58	84–88	91–80	98–94	81–93	74–94	86–78	94–92	80–84	66–81
Azad University	81–65		67–77	86–68	100–92	92–94	73–86	89–98	74–77	73–77	102–82	62–74	85–75
BEEM	95–81	84–72		107–93	94–68	88–76	76–56	77–66	69–75	70–73	72–65	94–104	87–92
HB Khorasan Razavi	97–99	82–92	50–85		78–81	82–92	82–102	68–90	62–97	73–103	86–101	70–96	79–94
HB Langaroud	63–74	68–77	87–74	79–64		81–76	68–64	49–87	60–89	61–84	77–71	90–93	74–76
HB Shahrekord	89–82	85–95	84–79	84–76	82–79		73–84	73–104	70–90	43–85	78–82	73–83	105–106
Louleh a.s	109–98	79–65	82–84	87–65	92–86	92–86		95–101	93–98	95–105	95–78	92–89	64–82
Mahram	85–69	76–74	85–73	76–71	86–79	114–69	86–75		69–75	94–85	95–67	98–89	91–89
Petrochimi	82–54	85–78	79–55	97–48	79–64	107–71	80–59	72–71		54–61	82–60	97–71	70–61
Saba Mehr	101–66	88–70	79–63	115–79	106–77	103–82	97–74	72–80	95–93		93–84	75–73	94–91
Shahrdari Gorgan	90–80	92–91	100–94	89–78	97–66	85–84	77–79	82–98	66–82	60–71		90–84	85–82
Tractorsazi	93–80	77–78	75–81	91–68	84–81	78–86	90–86	68–67	60–80	69–78	91–95		67–94
Zob Ahan	93–67	72–70	57–51	86–49	86–50	85–54	85–71	67–65	61–51	68–80	96–57	92–54	

== Relegation ==
Relegation
9	Azad University	83	99	—
12	HB Shahrekord	55	60	—
10	Ararat	74	57	—
11	HB Langaroud	91	81	—

== Playoffs ==
Quarter-finals
5	BEEM	91	82	—
7	Tractorsazi	99	85	—
Seventh place
8	Shahrdari Gorgan	DQ	—	—
6	Louleh a.s	—	—

Semi-finals
8	Shahrdari Gorgan	WD	—	—
5	BEEM	—	—
7	Tractorsazi	100	83	82
6	Louleh a.s	87	110	80

Final
1	Saba Mehr	77	110	—
8	Shahrdari Gorgan	72	70	—
4	Zob Ahan	67	86	—
5	BEEM	62	71	—
2	Petrochimi	91	79	—
7	Tractorsazi	79	63	—
3	Mahram	88	106	—
6	Louleh a.s	68	88	—

Semifinals
1	Saba Mehr	83	88	80
4	Zob Ahan	79	89	91
2	Petrochimi	91	71	64
3	Mahram	79	79	65

Final
4	Zob Ahan	106	76	—
3	Mahram	113	91	—
Third place
1	Saba Mehr	101	81	—
2	Petrochimi	72	78	—

== Final standings ==
Rank	Team	Qualification or relegation
1	Mahram Tehran	2010 WABA Champions Cup
2	Zob Ahan Isfahan	2010 WABA Champions Cup
3	Saba Mehr Qazvin	
4	Petrochimi Bandar Imam	
5	Tractorsazi Kordestan	
6	BEEM Mazandaran	
7	Louleh Sabz a.s Shiraz	
8	Shahrdari Gorgan	
9	Azad University Tehran	
10	Heyat Basketball Langaroud	
11	Heyat Basketball Shahrekord	Relegation to the first division
12	Ararat Tehran	Relegation to the first division
13	Heyat Basketball Khorasan Razavi	Relegation to the first division
