= Hamed Haddadi =

Iranian basketball player (born 1985)

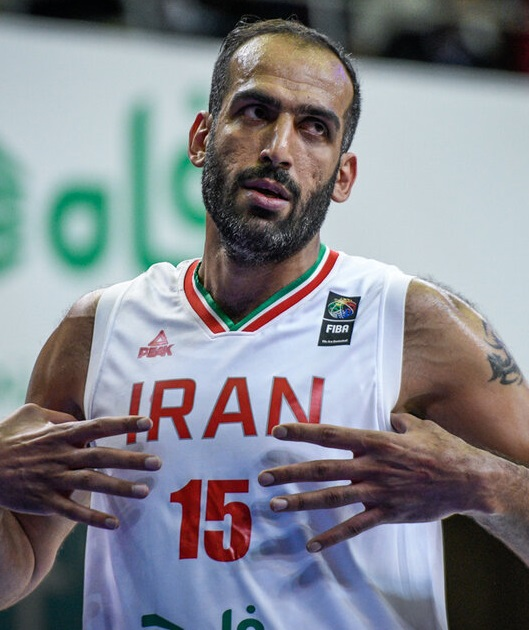
- Haddadi in 2020

No. 15 – Esteghlal BC
- Position: Center
- League: IBSL

Personal information
- Born: 19 May 1985 (age 41) Ahvaz, Iran
- Listed height: 7 ft 2 in (2.18 m)
- Listed weight: 263 lb (119 kg)

Career information
- NBA draft: 2004: undrafted
- Playing career: 2002–present

Career history
- 2002–2006: Paykan Tehran
- 2003: →Al-Nasr
- 2004: →Sanam Tehran
- 2007–2008: Saba Battery Tehran
- 2008–2013: Memphis Grizzlies
- 2008: →Dakota Wizards
- 2011: Melli Haffari Ahvaz
- 2013: Phoenix Suns
- 2013: Foolad Mahan Isfahan
- 2013–2014: Sichuan Blue Whales
- 2014: Mahram Tehran
- 2014–2015: Qingdao DoubleStar Eagles
- 2015: Mahram Tehran
- 2015–2016: Sichuan Blue Whales
- 2016: Petrochimi Bandar Imam
- 2016–2017: Sichuan Blue Whales
- 2017: Petrochimi Bandar Imam
- 2017–2018: Sichuan Blue Whales
- 2018–2019: Xinjiang Flying Tigers
- 2019: Champville SC
- 2019: Palayesh Naft Abadan
- 2019–2020: Nanjing Monkey Kings
- 2020–2023: Sichuan Blue Whales
- 2024–2025: Palayesh Naft Abadan
- 2025–present: Esteghlal BC

Career highlights
- 3× FIBA Asia Cup Champion (2007, 2009, 2013); 4× FIBA Asia Cup MVP (2007, 2009, 2013, 2017); CBA champion (2016); CBA Finals MVP (2016); 2× FIBA Asia Challenge champion (2014, 2016); 2x Asian Games Silver Medallist (2014, 2018); 2× FIBA Asian Club champion (2008, 2013); FIBA Asia Under-20 Championship Champion (2004); ×4 FIBA Basketball World Cup Appearance (2010, 2014, 2019, 2023); ×2 Olympic Games Stints (2008, 2020); Olympic rebounding leader (2008); Olympic blocks leader (2008, 2020); No.15 retired by Iran men's national basketball team
- Stats at NBA.com
- Stats at Basketball Reference
Medals
Men's basketball
Representing Iran
FIBA Asia Cup
Gold medal – first place	2007 Tokushima
Gold medal – first place	2009 Tianjin
Gold medal – first place	2013 Manila
Silver medal – second place	2017 Beirut
Bronze medal – third place	2015 Changsha
Asian Games
Silver medal – second place	2014 Incheon	Team
Silver medal – second place	2018 Jakarta-Palembang	Team
Bronze medal – third place	2006 Doha	Team
FIBA Asia Challenge
Gold medal – first place	2014 Wuhan
Gold medal – first place	2016 Tehran

Hamed Ehdadi Haddadi (Persian: حامد حدادی, Persian pronunciation: [hɑmɛd ɛ hæddɑdi], born 19 May 1985) is an Iranian professional basketball player for (Esteghlal BC) of the Iranian Basketball Super League (IBSL). He played at the center position and is 7 ft 2 in (2.18 meters) tall and weighs 254 pounds (115 kilograms). Haddadi was the first Iranian to play in the National Basketball Association (NBA) when he debuted with the Memphis Grizzlies in 2008. He played with the Grizzlies until 2013 before bouncing around the league with the Phoenix Suns. In 2013, he returned home to Iran before playing in China.

== Professional career ==
=== Iran ===
Before officially playing for a professional Iranian team, Haddadi started his basketball stint with a hometown team of his known as Shahin Ahvaz. His stint there would ultimately allow Haddadi to play in the Iranian Basketball Super League with Paykan Tehran and Saba Battery. In 2004, Haddadi would also play for Sanam Tehran for a bit as well. In August 2007, while still playing in Iran, he rejected a contract offer from the Serbian League team Partizan Belgrade in order to play for Saba Battery.

During the 2011 NBA lockout, Haddadi signed a short-term contract with his hometown team, Melli Haffari Ahvaz. During this period Haddadi received no salary from the team.

During the 2013 offseason, Haddadi signed a short-term contract with Foolad Mahan Isfahan. After his first stint with the Chinese Basketball Association, Haddadi would return to Iran once again to play for Mahram Tehran to play out the rest of their season.

On 9 March 2016, Haddadi signed with Petrochimi Bandar Imam of the Iranian Super League. However, he wouldn't make his debut until later on in March due to his CBA Finals duties with the Sichuan Blue Whales at the time. He would return to that same team once again after the 2016-17 CBA season concluded for Sichuan. This time around, however, he would play for them for the entirety of the 2017–18 season.

On 14 December 2025, Haddadi signed with Esteghlal BC of the Iranian Basketball Super League (IBSL).

=== United Arab Emirates ===
In 2003, Haddadi was assigned by Paykan Tehran to play for Al-Nasr from Dubai in the United Arab Emirates for a short period of time. He would ultimately return with Paykan after his stint with Al-Nasr.

=== NBA career ===
==== Memphis Grizzlies ====
Before the 2004 NBA draft, Haddadi declared himself eligible for the draft as an early entrant. However, he went undrafted in the draft and therefore became a free agent.

Haddadi received offers from NBA teams prior to the 2008 Summer Olympics and stated he would sign with a team after the games. Complications existed because of legal restrictions regarding business dealings between U.S. companies and Iranian citizens.

On 28 August 2008, Haddadi signed with the NBA's Memphis Grizzlies as a free-agent. Haddadi scored four points in 17 minutes of action in his first NBA preseason game, an 7 October 2008 loss at the Houston Rockets.

Haddadi averaged 1.7 points and 3.3 rebounds in 9.7 minutes in six preseason games with the Grizzlies, and made his regular season debut on 30 December, when he played 4 minutes in a loss against the Phoenix Suns, hitting both of his free throws and grabbing one rebound.

On 25 November 2008, Memphis assigned Haddadi to the Dakota Wizards of the NBA D-League. On Tuesday, 23 December 2008, Haddadi was recalled by the Grizzlies. Haddadi scored a then career-high 10 points, with 8 rebounds and a block in less than 10 minutes to key a 12–0 run in the 4th quarter, sparking the Grizzlies to a come-from-behind victory at the Golden State Warriors on 30 March 2009.

On 31 December 2011, he re-signed with the Memphis Grizzlies a one-year $1.3 million contract. On 17 April 2012, Hamed came off the bench to score 8 points in 12 minutes and give the Grizzlies a boost to lead them to a victory over the rival Minnesota Timberwolves. On 28 July 2012, Haddadi re-signed with the Memphis Grizzlies.

On 30 January 2013, Haddadi was traded to the Toronto Raptors along with Rudy Gay as part of a three-way deal that sent José Calderón to the Detroit Pistons and Ed Davis, Tayshaun Prince, Austin Daye, and a second-round pick to the Memphis Grizzlies. However, Haddadi could not immediately report to the Raptors due to immigration issues. He would never play a single game for the Raptors.

==== Phoenix Suns ====
On 21 February 2013, the Raptors traded Haddadi and a second-round draft pick to the Phoenix Suns for Sebastian Telfair. During his tenure with the Suns, Haddadi decided to wear the number 98 as a tribute of sorts to his home nation's national telephone code.

Haddadi did not play for the Suns until 6 March 2013, in a game against the Raptors, the team that Haddadi was first traded to. On 9 March 2013, Haddadi recorded 6 points, 3 blocks and a career-high 11 rebounds in 28 minutes off the bench, contributing to the Suns 107–105 win over the Houston Rockets.

Despite gaining professional career highs in his short stint with the team, Haddadi was waived by the Suns on 29 June 2013.

=== China ===
In September 2013, Haddadi signed with the Sichuan Blue Whales of the Chinese Basketball Association as the bonus foreign Asian player that's allowed to be on the expansion CBA team.

On 15 September 2014, Haddadi agreed to terms with Qingdao DoubleStar Eagles. With Haddadi's help, the Eagles were one of the top teams during the 2014–15 season. During his time in Qingdao, Haddadi would average 20.4 points, 13.9 rebounds, 3.7 assists, and 2.3 blocks for the team's surprise rise.

In September 2015, Haddadi returned to the Sichuan Blue Whales as their bonus foreign Asian player due to them having one of the worst records that season. During his second stint in Sichuan, Haddadi would help the team reach their first playoff stint in CBA history. He would help the Blue Whales sweep the Zhejiang Lions in the first round and the Xinjiang Flying Tigers in the second round before playing in the championship series against the Liaoning Flying Leopards. Before Haddadi would return to his home nation with Petrochimi Bandar Imam in Iran, he would help lead Sichuan to a 4–1 Finals series win over the Liaoning Flying Leopards, and thus becoming the CBA Finals MVP in the process. After finishing his most recent stint in his home nation, he'd return to Sichuan as an exception player for the two international players allowed on their roster.

After taking a year off from Chinese basketball, Haddadi returned to the CBA once again, this time playing as a starting centre for the Xinjiang Flying Tigers.

== National team career ==
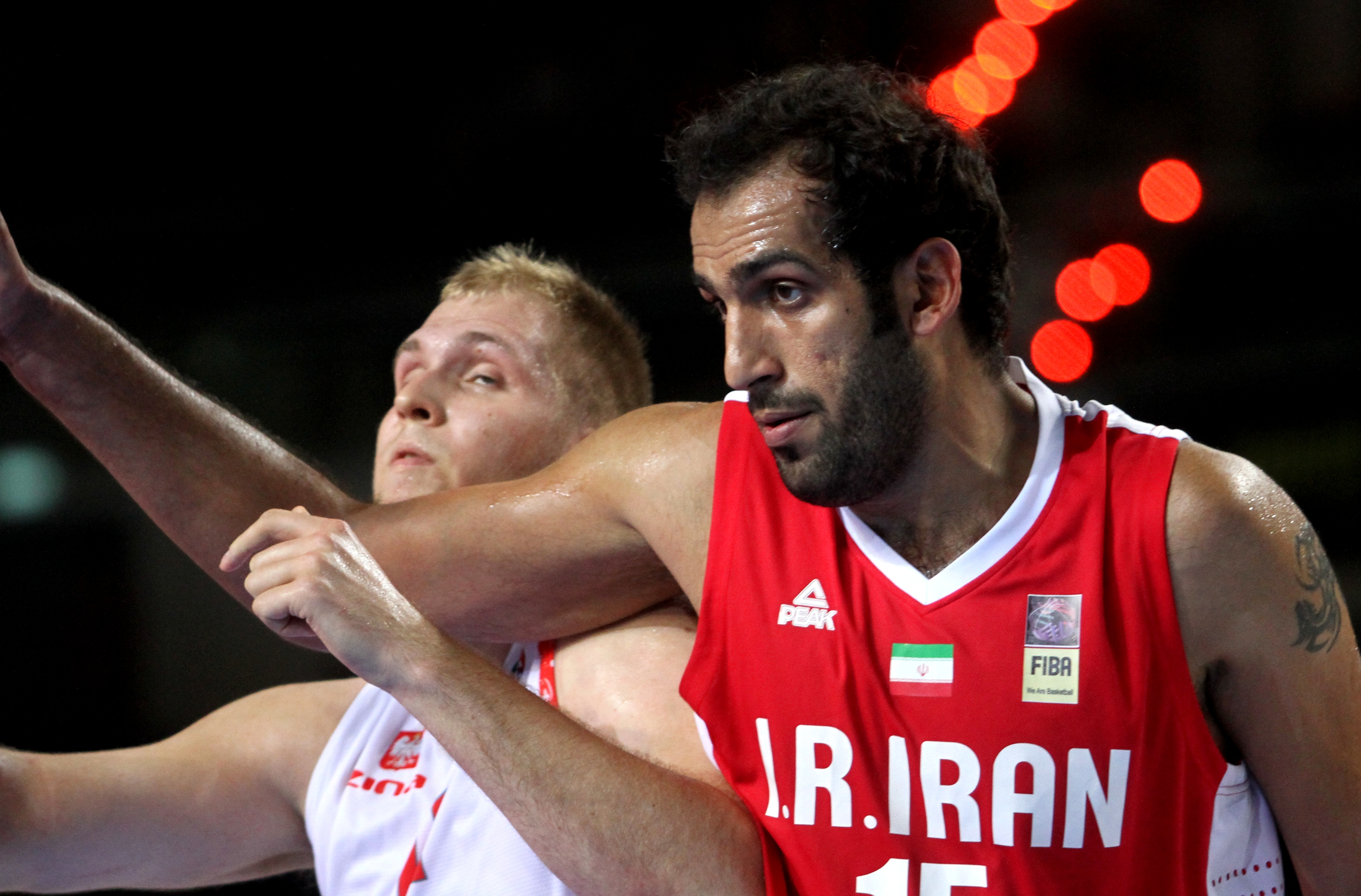
Haddadi with the national team in 2014.

Haddadi won a silver medal at the 2002 Asian Under-18 Championship and a gold medal at the 2004 Asian U20 Championship while playing on Iran's junior national teams. He won gold medals at the 2004 and 2005 West Asian Championships with the senior Iranian national basketball team.

Haddadi also won a bronze medal at the 2006 Asian Games and gold medals at the 2007 FIBA Asia Championship, 2009 FIBA Asia Championship, and the 2013 FIBA Asia Championship. He was also named the MVP of the latter four tournaments.

At the 2008 Summer Olympics in Beijing, he led the tournament with the highest average blocked shots per game and rebounds per game.

Haddadi was involved in a brawl in the 2009 William Jones cup against team Jordan, which was a vital game in the cup. It later led to the outcome of the championship where Iran won despite having a 6–2 standing while Jordan had a 7–1 record.

Haddadi led team Iran to back-to-back FIBA Asia championships, where they beat Jordan in the semifinals 77–75, and defeated tournament favorite and host China, 70–52.

Haddadi scored a game high 18 points in a loss to France in the preliminary round of the 2020 Olympics in Tokyo.

=== Retired number ===
The Iran Basketball Federation retired Hamed Haddadi's number 15 jersey on 21 February 2025, ahead of an Asia cup Qualifying game against India. It was the first jersey number retirement in Iran for any sport.

== Other ventures ==
In September 2009, Haddadi hosted a weekend basketball camp for children on the campus of California State University, Northridge. The camp catered mainly to the Iranian American community, and coaches included Haddadi himself, his manager, Mayar Zokaei, Los Angeles Lakers forward Ron Artest (now known as Metta World Peace), and Iranian professional basketball players Behdad Sami and Benny Koochoie, amongst others. The camp attracted over 100 children and was the first sports camp ever by an Iranian athlete in the United States.

Haddadi also spearheaded the Hamed Haddadi Javanan Foundation, a charity organization formed with the intention of awarding college scholarships to student athletes across the nation.

== NBA career statistics ==
Legend
GP	Games played	GS	Games started	MPG	Minutes per game
FG%	Field goal percentage	3P%	3-point field goal percentage	FT%	Free throw percentage
RPG	Rebounds per game	APG	Assists per game	SPG	Steals per game
BPG	Blocks per game	PPG	Points per game	**Bold**	Career high

=== Regular season ===
Year	Team	GP	GS	MPG	FG%	3P%	FT%	RPG	APG	SPG	BPG	PPG
2008–09	Memphis	19	0	6.3	.484	.000	.600	2.5	.4	.1	.6	2.5
2009–10	Memphis	**36**	0	6.7	.387	.000	**.737**	2.1	.3	.0	.4	1.7
2010–11	Memphis	31	0	5.4	.517	.000	.652	2.2	.2	.1	.4	2.4
2011–12	Memphis	35	0	5.9	**.542**	.000	.692	2.0	.2	.0	.7	2.0
2012–13	Memphis	13	0	6.7	.333	.000	.500	1.8	.3	.1	.5	1.2
2012–13	Phoenix	17	0	**13.8**	.459	.000	.520	**5.1**	**.5**	**.3**	**1.2**	**4.1**
Career		151	0	7.0	.463	.000	.632	2.5	.3	.1	.6	2.2

=== Playoffs ===
Year	Team	GP	GS	MPG	FG%	3P%	FT%	RPG	APG	SPG	BPG	PPG
2011	Memphis	**9**	0	3.4	.300	.000	**.833**	.9	.0	.0	**.6**	1.2
2012	Memphis	4	0	**5.3**	**1.000**	.000	.500	**2.3**	**.3**	.0	.5	**1.3**
Career		13	0	3.9	.417	.000	.750	1.3	.1	.0	.5	1.2

== Honors ==
=== National team ===
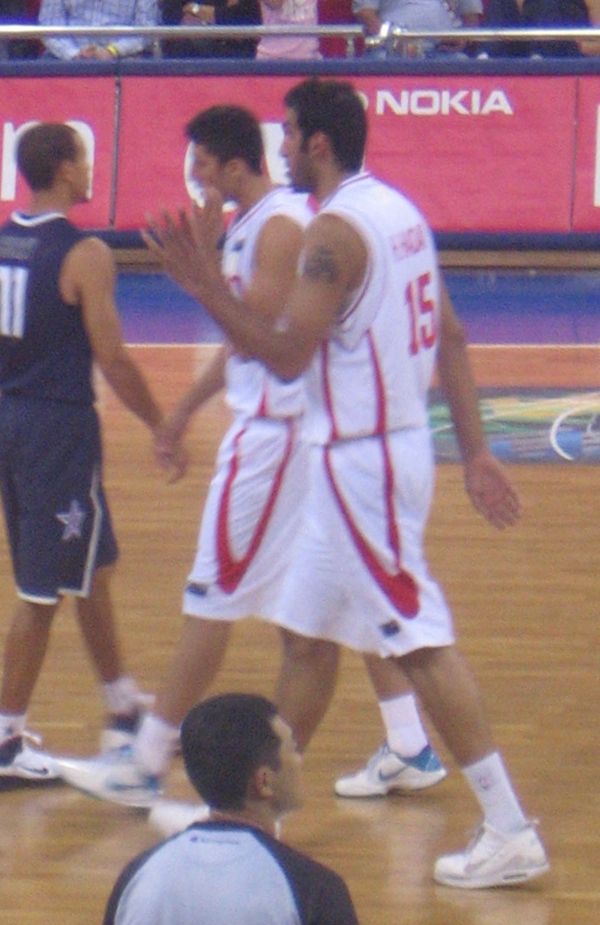
Haddadi playing for Iran in 2010

- Asia Cup
  - Gold medal: 2007, 2009, 2013
  - Silver medal: 2017
  - Bronze medal: 2015
- Asian Games
  - Silver medal: 2014, 2018
  - Bronze medal: 2006
- FIBA Asia Challenge
  - Gold medal: 2014, 2016
- Asian Under-20 Championship
  - Gold medal: 2004
- Asian Under-18 Championship
  - Silver medal: 2002
- William Jones Cup
  - 2009 – Champions
  - 2011 – Champions
  - 2013 – Champions
  - 2015 – Champions

=== Club ===
- Asian Champions Cup
  - Gold medal: 2008 (Saba Battery)
  - Gold medal: 2013 (Foolad Mahan)
- Chinese Basketball Association
  - Champions: 2016 (Sichuan Blue Whales)
- Iranian Basketball Super League
  - Champions: 2017, 2018 (Petrochimi)

=== Individual ===
- Asian Cup
  - MVP: 2007, 2009, 2013, 2017
- FIBA Asia Challenge
  - MVP: 2014, 2016
- Chinese Basketball Association
  - CBA Finals MVP: 2016
