= 2006 FIBA Asia Under-18 Championship =

2006 FIBA Under-18 Asia Cup
19th FIBA Under-18 Asian Basketball Championship

Tournament details
- Host country: China
- Dates: September 1–9
- Teams: 16
- Venue(s): 2 (in 1 host city)

Final positions
- Champions: China (8th title)

Tournament statistics
- MVP: (China) Chen Jianghua

The FIBA Asia Under-18 Championship 2006 is the 2006 edition of the International Basketball Federation FIBA Asia's youth championship for basketball. The games were held at Urumqi, China

The top 3 teams qualified for the 2007 FIBA Under-19 World Championship.

== Draw ==
Group A	Group B	Group C	Group D
Iran; India; Singapore; Chinese Taipei	South Korea; Syria; Kazakhstan; Yemen	China; Hong Kong; Japan; Kyrgyzstan	Lebanon; Thailand; Kuwait; Malaysia

== Preliminary round ==
=== Group A ===
Team	Pld	W	L	PF	PA	PD	Pts
Chinese Taipei	3	3	0	261	151	+110	6
Iran	3	2	1	245	200	+45	5
Singapore	3	1	2	170	235	−65	4
India	3	0	3	172	262	−90	3

September 1
15:00

Iran	59–87	Chinese Taipei
Scoring by quarter: 13–26, 13–17, 14–21, 19–23

Xinjiang Sports Center Stadium, Urumqi

September 1
15:00

India	59–78	Singapore
Scoring by quarter: 17–20, 16–24, 10–13, 16–21

Hong Shan Stadium, Urumqi

September 2
15:00

Singapore	51–98	Iran
Scoring by quarter: 17–26, 12–27, 7–28, 15–17

Xinjiang Sports Center Stadium, Urumqi

September 2
15:00

Chinese Taipei	96–51	India
Scoring by quarter: 23–10, 18–12, 28–18, 27–11

Hong Shan Stadium, Urumqi

September 3
15:00

Iran	88–62	India
Scoring by quarter: 21–14, 22–14, 18–15, 27–19

Xinjiang Sports Center Stadium, Urumqi

September 3
15:00

Singapore	41–78	Chinese Taipei
Scoring by quarter: 11–27, 11–22, 11–19, 8–10

Hong Shan Stadium, Urumqi

=== Group B ===
Team	Pld	W	L	PF	PA	PD	Pts
South Korea	3	3	0	281	252	+29	6
Kazakhstan	3	2	1	272	226	+46	5
Yemen	3	1	2	229	252	−23	4
Syria	3	0	3	212	264	−52	3

September 1
17:00

South Korea	97–82	Yemen
Scoring by quarter: 30–26, 26–17, 22–17, 19–22

Xinjiang Sports Center Stadium, Urumqi

September 1
17:00

Syria	60–99	Kazakhstan
Scoring by quarter: 14–24, 17–25, 12–34, 17–16

Hong Shan Stadium, Urumqi

September 2
17:00

Kazakhstan	88–96	South Korea
Scoring by quarter: 18–24, 21–19, 25–25, 24–28

Xinjiang Sports Center Stadium, Urumqi

September 2
17:00

Yemen	77–70	Syria
Scoring by quarter: 22–15, 18–15, 21–17, 16–23

Hong Shan Stadium, Urumqi

September 3
17:00

South Korea	88–82	Syria
Scoring by quarter: 26–12, 21–21, 29–17, 12–32

Xinjiang Sports Center Stadium, Urumqi

September 3
17:00

Kazakhstan	85–70	Yemen
Scoring by quarter: 21–18, 22–19, 24–16, 18–17

Hong Shan Stadium, Urumqi

=== Group C ===
Team	Pld	W	L	PF	PA	PD	Pts
China	3	3	0	367	179	+188	6
Japan	3	2	1	313	270	+43	5
Kyrgyzstan	3	1	2	207	280	−73	4
Hong Kong	3	0	3	175	333	−158	3

September 1
19:30

China	105–41	Kyrgyzstan
Scoring by quarter: 21–10, 23–9, 33–7, 28–15

Xinjiang Sports Center Stadium, Urumqi

September 1
19:30

Hong Kong	67–108	Japan
Scoring by quarter: 23–29, 8–22, 16–26, 20–31

Hong Shan Stadium, Urumqi

September 2
19:30

Japan	94–124	China
Scoring by quarter: 21–29, 26–29, 21–33, 26–33

Xinjiang Sports Center Stadium, Urumqi

September 2
19:30

Kyrgyzstan	87–64	Hong Kong
Scoring by quarter: 19–18, 19–18, 24–10, 25–18

Hong Shan Stadium, Urumqi

September 3
19:30

China	138–44	Hong Kong
Scoring by quarter: 16–20, 24–20, 36–17, 35–22

Xinjiang Sports Center Stadium, Urumqi

September 3
19:30

Japan	111–79	Kyrgyzstan
Scoring by quarter: 30–26, 26–17, 22–17, 19–22

Hong Shan Stadium, Urumqi

=== Group D ===
Team	Pld	W	L	PF	PA	PD	Pts
Lebanon	3	3	0	305	134	+171	6
Kuwait	3	2	1	227	229	−2	5
Thailand	3	1	2	186	254	−68	4
Malaysia	3	0	3	178	279	−101	3

September 1
21:30

Lebanon	117–29	Malaysia
Scoring by quarter: 38–10, 28–6, 27–8, 24–5

Xinjiang Sports Center Stadium, Urumqi

September 1
21:30

Thailand	70–76	Kuwait
Scoring by quarter: 18–22, 16–14, 17–17, 19–23

Hong Shan Stadium, Urumqi

September 2
21:30

Kuwait	73–86	Lebanon
Scoring by quarter: 16–12, 16–22, 15–27, 26–25

Xinjiang Sports Center Stadium, Urumqi

September 2
21:30

Malaysia	76–84	Thailand
Scoring by quarter: 21–25, 15–13, 19–25, 21–21

Hong Shan Stadium, Urumqi

September 3
21:30

Lebanon	102–32	Thailand
Scoring by quarter: 29–3, 26–12, 27–8, 20–9

Xinjiang Sports Center Stadium, Urumqi

September 3
21:30

Kuwait	78–73	Malaysia
Scoring by quarter: 16–11, 12–14, 29–16, 21–32

Hong Shan Stadium, Urumqi

== Quarterfinal round ==
=== Group I ===
Team	Pld	W	L	PF	PA	PD	Pts
China	3	3	0	275	177	+98	6
Chinese Taipei	3	2	1	242	252	−10	5
Kazakhstan	3	1	2	237	221	+16	4
Kuwait	3	0	3	185	289	−104	3

September 4
17:00

Chinese Taipei	106–76	Kuwait
Scoring by quarter: 29–12, 23–19, 26–10, 28–35

Xinjiang Sports Center Stadium, Urumqi

September 4
19:30

Kazakhstan	66–87	China
Scoring by quarter: 17–31, 17–23, 15–23, 17–10

Xinjiang Sports Center Stadium, Urumqi

September 5
19:30

China	101–57	Chinese Taipei
Scoring by quarter: 24–22, 25–7, 27–22, 25–6

Hong Shan Stadium, Urumqi

September 5
19:30

Kuwait	55–96	Kazakhstan
Scoring by quarter: 7–19, 13–21, 12–25, 23–31

Xinjiang Sports Center Stadium, Urumqi

September 6
19:30

China	87–54	Kuwait
Scoring by quarter: 14–13, 15–25, 13–19, 12–30

Xinjiang Sports Center Stadium, Urumqi

September 6
21:30

Chinese Taipei	79–75	Kazakhstan
Scoring by quarter: 26–17, 14–18, 20–19, 19–21

Xinjiang Sports Center Stadium, Urumqi

=== Group II ===
Team	Pld	W	L	PF	PA	PD	Pts
South Korea	3	3	0	272	256	+16	6
Lebanon	3	2	1	269	235	+34	5
Japan	3	1	2	249	262	−13	4
Iran	3	0	3	224	261	−37	3

September 4
15:00

Iran	70–77	Lebanon
Scoring by quarter: 17–21, 17–11, 21–22, 15–23

Xinjiang Sports Center Stadium, Urumqi

September 4
21:30

South Korea	87–85	Japan
Scoring by quarter: 27–26, 10–8, 30–28, 20–23

Xinjiang Sports Center Stadium, Urumqi

September 5
17:00

Japan	99–75	Iran
Scoring by quarter: 23–12, 22–18, 29–20, 25–25

Xinjiang Sports Center Stadium, Urumqi

September 5
21:30

Lebanon	92–100	South Korea
Scoring by quarter: 23–27, 21–18, 27–23, 21–32

Xinjiang Sports Center Stadium, Urumqi

September 6
15:00

Iran	79–85	South Korea
Scoring by quarter: 13–26, 27–21, 12–23, 27–15

Xinjiang Sports Center Stadium, Urumqi

September 6
17:00

Japan	65–100	Lebanon
Scoring by quarter: 11–17, 20–30, 13–28, 21–25

Xinjiang Sports Center Stadium, Urumqi

=== Group III ===
Team	Pld	W	L	PF	PA	PD	Pts
Syria	3	3	0	239	202	+37	6
Kyrgyzstan	3	2	1	236	210	+26	5
Malaysia	3	1	2	216	233	−17	4
Singapore	3	0	3	195	241	−46	3

September 4
19:30

Singapore	59–72	Malaysia
Scoring by quarter: 19–22, 10–11, 16–22, 14–17

Hong Shan Stadium, Urumqi

September 4
21:30

Syria	67–65	Kyrgyzstan
Scoring by quarter: 18–23, 9–17, 18–8, 22–17

Hong Shan Stadium, Urumqi

September 5
15:00

Kyrgyzstan	81–64	Singapore
Scoring by quarter: 19–17, 25–10, 19–17, 18–20

Xinjiang Sports Center Stadium, Urumqi

September 5
21:30

Malaysia	65–84	Syria
Scoring by quarter: 15–21, 19–25, 12–21, 19–17

Hong Shan Stadium, Urumqi

September 6
19:30

Singapore	72–88	Syria
Scoring by quarter: 15–28, 10–23, 22–20, 25–17

Hong Shan Stadium, Urumqi

September 6
21:30

Kyrgyzstan	90–79	Malaysia
Scoring by quarter: 21–17, 15–18, 30–26, 24–18

Hong Shan Stadium, Urumqi

=== Group IV ===
Team	Pld	W	L	PF	PA	PD	Pts
Yemen	3	3	0	245	179	+66	6
Thailand	3	2	1	203	230	−27	5
India	3	1	2	218	211	+7	4
Hong Kong	3	0	3	185	231	−46	3

September 4
15:00

India	77–81	Thailand
Scoring by quarter: 21–25, 23–20, 15–20, 18–16

Hong Shan Stadium, Urumqi

September 4
17:00

Yemen	85–62	Hong Kong
Scoring by quarter: 27–10, 18–7, 26–21, 14–24

Hong Shan Stadium, Urumqi

September 5
15:00

Hong Kong	65–78	India
Scoring by quarter: 18–26, 5–13, 18–16, 24–23

Hong Shan Stadium, Urumqi

September 5
17:00

Thailand	54–95	Yemen
Scoring by quarter: 16–23, 12–21, 11–26, 15–25

Hong Shan Stadium, Urumqi

September 6
15:00

India	63–65	Yemen
Scoring by quarter: 13–16, 9–10, 23–15, 18–24

Hong Shan Stadium, Urumqi

September 6
17:00

Hong Kong	58–68	Thailand
Scoring by quarter: 19–28, 10–17, 17–11, 12–12

Hong Shan Stadium, Urumqi

== Classification 9th–14th ==
=== 15th place ===
September 8
15:00

Singapore	79–74	Hong Kong
Scoring by quarter: 20–18, 20–18, 15–23, 24–15

Xinjiang Sports Center Stadium, Urumqi

=== 13th place ===
September 8
15:00

Malaysia	90–99	India
Scoring by quarter: 21–22, 23–28, 19–28, 27–21

Hong Shan Stadium, Urumqi

=== 11th place ===
September 8
17:00

Kyrgyzstan	77–78	Thailand
Scoring by quarter: 14–21, 14–21, 22–14, 27–22

Xinjiang Sports Center Stadium, Urumqi

=== 9th place ===
September 8
17:00

Syria	75–63	Yemen
Scoring by quarter: 17–14, 15–16, 26–19, 17–14

Hong Shan Stadium, Urumqi

== Classification 5th–8th ==
Semifinals
September 8
Kazakhstan	78
Iran	50
September 8
Japan	98
Kuwait	80

5th place
September 9
Kazakhstan	108
Japan	80
7th place
September 9
Iran	102
Kuwait	66

=== Semifinals ===
September 8
19:30

Kazakhstan	78–50	Iran
Scoring by quarter: 30–14, 13–11, 21–13, 14–12

Hong Shan Stadium, Urumqi

September 8
21:30

Japan	98–80	Kuwait
Scoring by quarter: 18–17, 23–22, 21–19, 36–22

Hong Shan Stadium, Urumqi

=== 7th place ===
September 9
15:00

Iran	102–66	Kuwait
Scoring by quarter: 15–12, 22–12, 38–23, 27–19

Hong Shan Stadium, Urumqi

=== 5th place ===
September 9
17:30

Kazakhstan	108–80	Japan
Scoring by quarter: 28–15, 25–26, 27–17, 28–22

Xinjiang Sports Center Stadium, Urumqi

== Final round ==
Semifinals
September 8
China	129
Lebanon	76
September 8
South Korea	72
Chinese Taipei	66

Final
September 9
China	99
South Korea	83
3rd place
September 9
Lebanon	83
Chinese Taipei	60

=== Semifinals ===
September 8
19:30

China	129–76	Lebanon
Scoring by quarter: 33–15, 26–15, 37–23, 33–23

Xinjiang Sports Center Stadium, Urumqi

September 8
21:30

South Korea	72–66	Chinese Taipei
Scoring by quarter: 24–20, 14–14, 16–15, 18–17

Xinjiang Sports Center Stadium, Urumqi

=== 3rd place ===
September 9
17:00

Lebanon	83–60	Chinese Taipei
Scoring by quarter: 21–15, 21–14, 20–14, 21–17

Hong Shan Stadium, Urumqi

=== Final ===
September 9
19:30

China	99–83	South Korea
Scoring by quarter: 25–22, 23–16, 28–23, 23–22

Xinjiang Sports Center Stadium, Urumqi

== Final standing ==
Qualified for the 2007 FIBA Under-19 World Championship

Rank	Team	Record
1st place, gold medalist(s)	China	8–0
2nd place, silver medalist(s)	South Korea	7–1
3rd place, bronze medalist(s)	Lebanon	6–2
4	Chinese Taipei	5–3
5	Kazakhstan	5–3
6	Japan	4–4
7	Iran	3–5
8	Kuwait	2–6
9	Syria	4–3
10	Yemen	4–3
11	Thailand	4–3
12	Kyrgyzstan	3–4
13	India	2–5
14	Malaysia	1–6
15	Singapore	2–5
16	Hong Kong	0–7

== Awards ==
2006 Asian Under-18 champions

China
Eighth title
