= BEEM Mazandaran Cultural and Sport Club =

BEEM Mazandaran
- Leagues: Iranian Super League
- Founded: 2006
- History: 2006–2009
- Arena: Shahid Sojoudi Arena
- Location: Babol, Iran
- Team colors: White and Blue
- President: Ahmad Saeidian
- Ownership: Bijan Mehshat
- Website: www.beemclub.com
Home	Away

BEEM Babol Cultural and Sport Club was an Iranian multisport club based in Babol, Iran.

The club is owned by BEEM (Blitz-Elektro-Erzeugnisse Manufaktur) a German electrical appliance company based in Rosbach vor der Höhe. The Managing Director of the company is Iranian Bijan Mehshat.

== Basketball ==
BEEM competed in 2007–08 and 2008–09 season and respectively finished 8th and 6th.

=== Notable players ===
- (Dominica) Garth Joseph
- (Iran) Mousa Nabipour
- (Iran) Pouya Tajik
- (Iran) Iman Zandi
- (Mali) Soumaila Samake
- (United States) Josh Moore

== Volleyball ==
BEEM competed in 2008–09 season and finished 3rd.

=== Notable players ===
- (Bulgaria) Evgeni Ivanov
- (Bulgaria) Ivan Tassev
