= Pardis Mottahed Qazvin =

Iranian sport club

Pardis Mottahed Qazvin Club was an Iranian multisport club based in Qazvin, Iran. They competed in the Iranian Basketball Super League and the Iranian Volleyball Super League.

== Basketball ==
Pardis competed in 2007–08 season and finished 10th.

=== Notable players ===
- (United States) Jabari Smith

== Volleyball ==
Pardis competed in 2008–09 season and finished 4th.
