= Kaveh Tehran BC =

Iranian basketball club

Kaveh Tehran
- Leagues: Iranian Super League
- Founded: 2006
- History: 2006–2008
- Arena: Azadi Basketball Hall
- Location: Tehran, Iran
- Team colors: White and Black
- President: Kambiz Shokouhi Azar
- Championships: (1) Iranian Division 1
- Website: www.kavehbasket.com
| Home | Away |

Kaveh Tehran Basketball Club was an Iranian professional basketball club based in Tehran, Iran. They competed in the Iranian Basketball Super League 2007–08 season.

== Notable former players ==
- (Iran) Amir Amini
- (Iran) Saeid Davarpanah
- (Iran) Mousa Nabipour
- (Slovenia) Ivica Jurković
- (United States) Omar Sneed
