= Evgeni Ivanov (volleyball) =

Bulgarian volleyball player

Personal information
- Full name: Evgeni Ivanov
- Nationality: Bulgarian
- Born: 3 June 1974 (age 52); Sofia, Bulgaria
- Height: 2.10 m (6 ft 11 in)
- Weight: 98 kg (216 lb)
- Spike: 351 cm (138 in)
- Block: 340 cm (130 in)

Volleyball information
- Position: Middle blocker

Career
Years	Teams
2000–2001; 2001–2002; 2002–2003; 2003–2005; 2005–2006; 2006–2007; 2007–2008; 2008–2009; 2009–2010; 2010–2012	VC CSKA Sofia; Cagliari Volley; Pallavolo Piacenza; Slavia Sofia; Tourcoing Lille; Fakel Novy Urengoy; BOT Skra Bełchatów; Jastrzębski Węgiel; BEEM Mazandaran; Saipa Teheran; VC CSKA Sofia

National team
1992–2008	Bulgaria (231)
Honours
Representing Bulgaria
Men's volleyball
World Cup
Bronze medal – third place	2007 Japan
- Last updated: 20 February 2017

Evgeni Ivanov (Bulgarian: Евгени Иванов) (born 3 June 1974 in Sofia, Bulgaria) is a former Bulgarian volleyball player, a former member of Bulgaria men's national volleyball team, a participant of the Olympic Games (Atlanta 1996, Beijing 2008), a bronze medalist of the World Cup 2007.

== Personal life ==
Ivanov was born in Sofia, Bulgaria. He has wife and two children - Sarah and Simona. Creator and owner of the first private organization dealing with sports management, marketing and public health in Bulgaria - ASEM GROUP Ltd. ("ASEM Group" Ltd.). Ivanov develop original projects related to the prevention and care of children's health, supports national campaigns promoting junior sport and promotes physical activity for the whole family as a healthy lifestyle.

== Career ==
=== Clubs ===
He is alumnus of the Bulgarian club VC CSKA Sofia. His first coach was Nikolai Adamov, who worked with this team. In season 2006/2007 was a player of the BOT Skra Bełchatów. He won with club from Bełchatów title of Polish Champion and Polish Cup 2007. In 2007/2008 played for another Polish club - Jastrzębski Węgiel, but the team lost their 3rd place match with AZS Olsztyn. Club didn't renew the contract. Then he played in Iran to 2010. In 2010, he returned to VC CSKA Sofia, where in 2012 ended his career as an active competitor.

== Sporting achievements ==
=== Clubs ===
==== National championships ====
- 2006/2007 Polish Cup, with BOT Skra Bełchatów
- 2006/2007 Polish Championship, with BOT Skra Bełchatów
- 2009/2010 Bulgarian Championship, with CSKA Sofia
- 2010/2011 Bulgarian Championship, with CSKA Sofia
