= Jabari Smith =

American basketball player (born 1977)

Personal information
- Born: February 12, 1977 (age 49) Atlanta, Georgia, U.S.
- Listed height: 6 ft 11 in (2.11 m)
- Listed weight: 250 lb (113 kg)

Career information
- High school: Booker T. Washington (Atlanta, Georgia)
- College: Atlanta Metropolitan State (1996–1998); LSU (1998–2000)
- NBA draft: 2000: 2nd round, 45th overall pick
- Drafted by: Sacramento Kings
- Playing career: 2000–2010
- Position: Center / power forward
- Number: 52, 41, 55

Career history
- 2000–2001: Sacramento Kings
- 2001–2002: Philadelphia 76ers
- 2002: CB Granada
- 2003–2004: Sacramento Kings
- 2004–2005: New Jersey Nets
- 2006–2007: Beşiktaş Cola Turka
- 2007–2008: Pardis Mottahed Qazvin BC
- 2009: Vaqueros de Bayamón
- 2009: Conquistadores de Guaynabo
- 2010: Pioneros de Quintana Roo

Career highlights
- Second-team All-SEC (2000)
- Stats at NBA.com
- Stats at Basketball Reference

Jabari Montsho Smith Sr. (born February 12, 1977) is an American former professional basketball player who played four seasons in the National Basketball Association (NBA).

== Professional career ==
After a college career at Louisiana State University, he was selected by the Sacramento Kings in the second round of the 2000 NBA draft. He has played for the Kings, the Philadelphia 76ers and the New Jersey Nets over a span of 5 years, for a total of 108 games and averages of 3 points and 1.6 rebounds per game. His final NBA game was played in Game 4 of the 2005 Eastern Conference First Round on May 1, 2005, against the Miami Heat. In that game, Smith only played for 44 seconds (substituting at the very end of the 4th quarter for Vince Carter) and recorded no stats. The Nets would lose the game and get swept by Miami. In that first round series, Smith played in 3 games for a total of 3 minutes.

Smith also played in Spain, Turkey, Iran, Puerto Rico, and Mexico. He last played with Pioneros de Quintana Roo in Mexico.

== Career statistics ==
Legend
GP	Games played	GS	Games started	MPG	Minutes per game
FG%	Field goal percentage	3P%	3-point field goal percentage	FT%	Free throw percentage
RPG	Rebounds per game	APG	Assists per game	SPG	Steals per game
BPG	Blocks per game	PPG	Points per game	**Bold**	Career high

=== NBA ===
Year	Team	GP	GS	MPG	FG%	3P%	FT%	RPG	APG	SPG	BPG	PPG
2000–01	Sacramento	19	0	10.5	.426	—	.667	.9	.7	.4	.0	2.9
2001–02	Sacramento	12	0	5.9	.286	.000	.500	1.2	.5	.2	**.3**	1.5
2001–02	Philadelphia	11	0	10.0	**.476**	.000	**.750**	1.3	.5	.4	.2	**5.0**
2003–04	Sacramento	31	0	5.4	.371	.000	.600	1.0	.4	.1	.2	2.1
2004–05	New Jersey	**45**	**2**	**14.4**	.419	**.500**	.745	**2.5**	**.8**	**.6**	**.3**	3.7
Career		108	2	9.8	.413	.125	.690	1.6	.6	.3	.2	3.0

== Personal life ==
His son, Jabari Smith Jr., is an NBA player for the Houston Rockets. He played in college for the Auburn Tigers basketball team. Smith and his son are one of several pairs of fathers and sons to have both played against LeBron James throughout James's 24-year career.

Smith's cousin Kwame Brown was selected as the first overall pick in the 2001 NBA draft.
