= Omar Sneed =

American basketball player

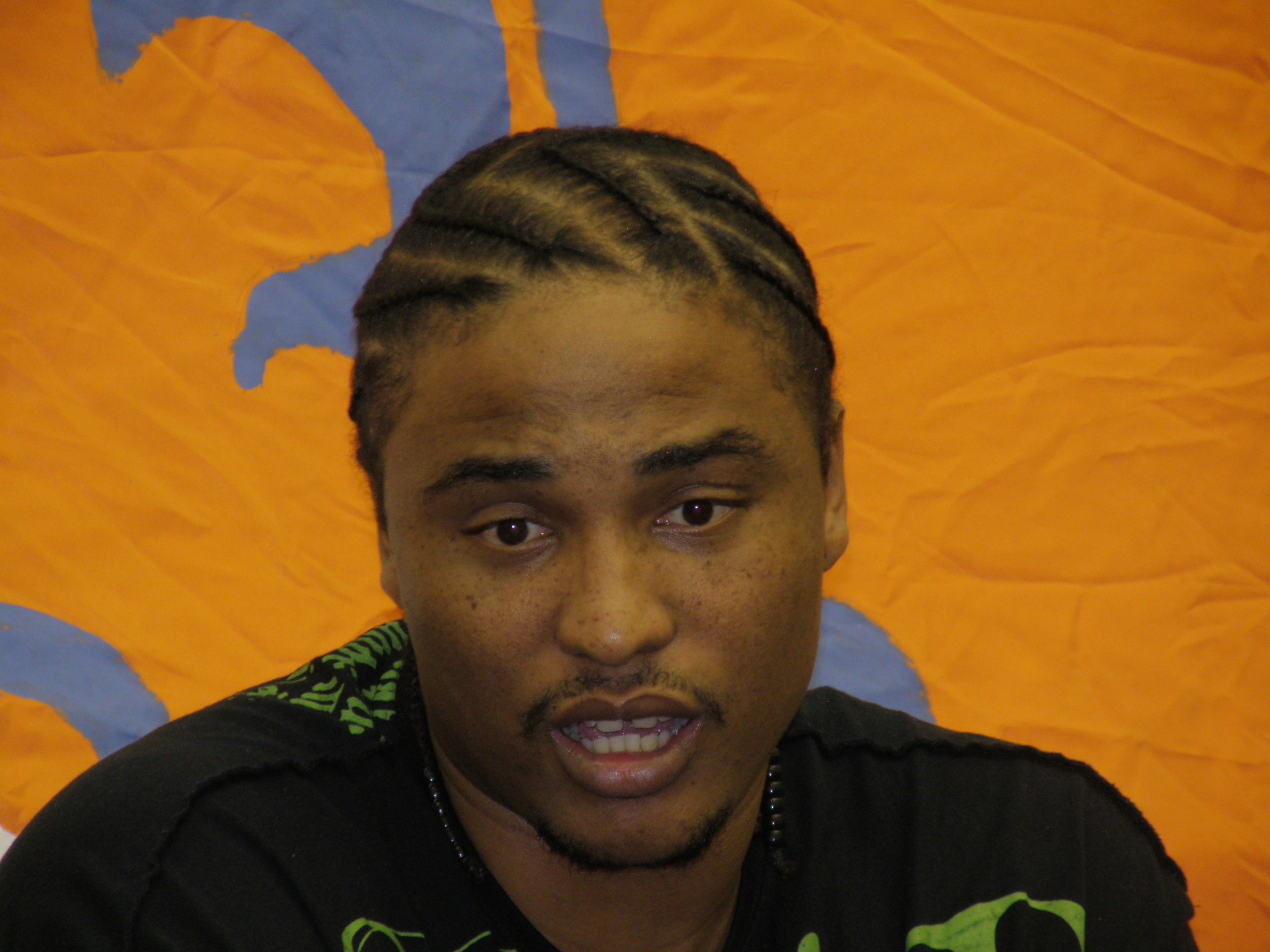
- Sneed in 2009

Beaumont Panthers
- Title: Head coach
- League: TBL

Personal information
- Born: October 9, 1976 (age 50) Beaumont, Texas
- Listed height: 6 ft 6 in (1.98 m)
- Listed weight: 239 lb (108 kg)

Career information
- High school: West Brook (Beaumont, Texas)
- College: San Jacinto (1995–1997); Memphis (1997–1999)
- NBA draft: 1999: undrafted
- Playing career: 1999–2014
- Position: Small forward / power forward
- Coaching career: 2021–present

Career history

Playing
- 1999: Sabios de Manizales
- 1999–2000: Melco Ieper
- 2000: San Lázaro
- 2000–2001: BSW Weert
- 2001–2002: Power Wevelgem
- 2002–2003: Znicz Pruszków
- 2003–2004: London Towers
- 2004–2005: Elitzur Ashkelon
- 2005–2006: Maccabi Rishon LeZion
- 2006–2008: Lokomotiv Rostov
- 2008: Kaveh
- 2008: Saba Battery
- 2008: Maccabi Rishon LeZion
- 2008–2009: Hapoel Jerusalem
- 2009–2010: Elitzur Ashkelon
- 2010–2011: Pinar Karşıyaka
- 2011: Defensor Sporting
- 2012: Mersin BB
- 2012: Powerade Tigers
- 2012–2013: Mersin BB
- 2014: Ankara DSİ

Coaching
- 2021–present: Beaumont Panthers

Career highlights
- 2× Israeli Basketball Premier League Quintet (2006, 2009); DBL All-Star (2001); DBL scoring champion (2001); Second-team All-C-USA (1999); First-team All-C-USA (1998)

Omar Shariff Sneed (born October 9, 1976) is an American professional basketball coach and former player who is the head coach for the Beaumont Panthers of The Basketball League (TBL). A Texas native, Sneed played high school basketball at West Brook in Beaumont.

He then played two years in junior college at San Jacinto, being named a first team NJCAA All-American. He played his junior and senior seasons in the NCAA Division I with the Memphis Tigers, being a two-time all-conference selection. After going undrafted in the 1999 NBA draft, Sneed started his professional career in Colombia. Over the years he has played in several countries in Asia, Europe and South America, being the top scorer of the Dutch league in 2001 and being named in the top-5 of the Israeli Basketball Premier League. He retired from professional basketball in 2015 after a season in the Turkish second division.

== High school career ==
Sneed was born in Texas to Robert and Gertrude Sneed. He attended West Brook High School in Beaumont, where he averaged 32 points per game as a sophomore in the 1992–93 season. As a senior, Sneed averaged 21 points and 13 rebounds per game, being selected in the All-State First Team by the Texas Association of Basketball Coaches (TABC).

== College career ==
=== San Jacinto ===
Sneed was recruited by NCAA Division I programs Houston and Texas during his high school career. He signed with Houston in April 1995; however, Sneed did not qualify academically to play in the NCAA, and he decided to play for a junior college in the NJCAA, choosing San Jacinto College, a community college in the Houston area which competed in the NJCAA Division I.

In his freshman season Sneed averaged 21 points and 10.9 rebounds per game, shooting 60.3% from the field. At the end of the season, Sneed was named in the All-TEC first team as one of the best players in the conference. As a sophomore, Sneed played along future NBA player Steve Francis, who had joined San Jacinto as a freshman in 1996; in a game against Blinn College, Sneed scored a career-high 43 points. Sneed averaged 24.2 points and 11.3 rebounds per game, shooting 58.2% from the field, and was ranked 7th in the nation among junior college players. San Jacinto reached the championship game during the 1997 NJCAA Division I tournament in Hutchinson, Kansas, losing to Indian Hills Community College of Iowa, 80–89. Sneed was the top scorer of the game with 26 points (18 in the first half). At the end of the season, Sneed was named the 1997 TEAC MVP, and was included in the All-Conference First Team; he was also a first-team All-American, and the Basketball Times named him JUCO National Player of the Year.

=== Memphis ===
In May 1997, Sneed signed a National Letter of Intent to play for Memphis in the NCAA Division I. He chose to wear jersey number 31 and made his debut with the Tigers in the season opener against Louisiana–Monroe on November 15, 1997; in the following game, he recorded a double-double with 23 points and 10 rebounds against Vanderbilt. On December 20, he scored a new career-high 30 points against Tennessee. On February 2, 1998 Sneed was named Conference USA Player of the Week; on February 11, he posted 37 points and 20 rebounds, career-highs at Memphis, in a double overtime loss against DePaul. On February 21, he scored 34 points (with 8 rebounds) against Louisville, earning his second Conference USA Player of the Week nomination on February 23. He had 12 double-doubles in the season, leading the team in scoring in 18 games and in rebounding in 16 games. He also led the Conference USA in scoring (22.7 points per game) and rebounding (9.7) in conference games only (16 appearances). He started all 29 games, playing a total of 1,053 minutes (36.3 per game), and averaged 20.9 points and 9.2 rebounds for the season, shooting 58.5% from the field. At the end of the season he was named the team MVP, and a first-team All-Conference USA selection. He was also named in the USBWA All-District 4 team and in the NABC District 7 First Team, and the Tennessee Sports Writers Association named him Player of the Year.

Before the start of his senior season, Sneed was named in the preseason first-team All-Conference USA by the coaches, who also named him the preseason Conference USA Player of the Year. The USBWA also named him in the preseason watchlist for the Oscar Robertson Trophy. Sneed debuted in the season opener against UNC Wilmington, scoring 10 points. Sneed averaged 16.7 points and 7.5 rebounds per game, leading the team in scoring and rebounding. During his senior year he recorded 6 double-doubles, bringing his career total to 18. He started all 28 games, playing 890 total minutes (31.8 per game). He played his last game with Memphis on March 3, 1999, against South Florida during the 1999 Conference USA tournament, fouling out in the final minute after having posted 16 points and 10 rebounds. At the end of the year, Sneed was named in the NABC All-District 7 First Team and in the All-Conference USA Second Team. Sneed scored a total of 1,072 points in two seasons (the fourth player to do so in Memphis history), which at the time of his retirement ranked him 29th in the program's all-time scoring list.

=== College statistics ===
Year	Team	GP	GS	MPG	FG%	3P%	FT%	RPG	APG	SPG	BPG	PPG
1997–98	Memphis	29	29	36.3	.585	.238	.667	9.2	2.2	1.6	0.4	20.9
1998–99	Memphis	28	28	31.8	.506	.162	.642	7.5	1.7	1.4	0.2	16.7
Career		57	57	34.1	.548	.190	.655	8.4	2.0	1.5	0.3	18.8

== Professional career ==
After the end of his senior season, Sneed was automatically eligible for the 1999 NBA draft, where he went undrafted. He was selected by the San Diego Stingrays in the third round (24th overall) of the 1999 IBL draft, and by the Rockford Lightning in the eighth round (65th overall) of the 1999 CBA draft. Sneed opted to play abroad, and signed with Sabios de Manizales in Colombia in the fall of 1999, playing in the Copa Costeñita, the national basketball championship of Colombia. He then signed in November 1999 for Melco Ieper in Belgium, and played one game for the team; he also played for San Lázaro in the Dominican Republic. In 2000 he signed for BSW Weert of the Dutch Basketball League, and he led the league in scoring in the 2000–01 season, averaging 27.1 points per game. He was also named the All-Star Game MVP after posting 30 points and 14 rebounds.

In the summer of 2001, Sneed played for the Houston Rockets in the Rocky Mountain Revue, an NBA Summer League tournament. He then joined Power Wevelgem in Belgium, where he ranked second in the league in scoring with 20.9 points per game. Sneed was selected by the Huntsville Flight in the 12th round (92nd overall) in the 2002 National Basketball Development League draft. Instead of signing for a NBDL team, Sneed joined Znicz Pruszków, and during the 2002–03 Polish Basketball League season he averaged 17.5 points, 5.6 rebounds, 2.2 assists and 1.4 steals per game over 25 appearances. In October 2003, Sneed signed for the London Towers in the British Basketball League. He played 33 games in the 2003–04 BBL season, averaging 22.3 points, 8.8 rebounds, 4 assists and 1.7 steals per game, placing fifth in the league in rebounding.

Sneed had his first experience in Israel in the 2004–05 season, during which he played for Elitzur Ashkelon. He averaged 19.1 points, 7.3 rebounds, 3.2 assists and 1.4 steals per game for the team in the regular season, and he also participated in the playoffs. For the following season, Sneed signed with another Israeli team, Maccabi Rishon LeZion: he averaged 18.4 points, 7.4 rebounds and 4.3 assists per game, earning his first selection in the Israeli Basketball Premier League Quintet, the all-league first team. In 2006, Sneed signed a contract for Lokomotiv Rostov of the Russian Super League, and he averaged 11.5 points, 7 rebounds and 2.3 assists per game over 22 appearances, placing fifth in the league in rebounding. He also took part in the 2006–07 FIBA EuroCup with the team. He stayed with the club for the following season, and played 4 games (14.7 points, 2.3 rebounds, 2 assists) before moving to Iran and signing for Kaveh BC of Tehran. During the 2007–08 Iranian Basketball Super League he also took part in postseason play in the series lost 0–3 by Kaveh to Mahram, scoring 30, 23 and 27 points, respectively. He also played in the 2008 WABA Champions Cup with Saba Battery, another club from Tehran.

In July 2008 he signed with Hapoel Jerusalem, thus returning to Israel and finding coach Guy Goodes who had already coached him Maccabi Rishon LeZion in 2004–05. With Hapoel he averaged 14.7 points, 7.2 rebounds and 5 assists (a career-high) per game in the 2008–09 season, earning his second nomination in the Premier League Quintet. He also took part in the 2008–09 FIBA EuroChallenge, averaging 15.8 points and 5 rebounds over 5 games. In 2009 he left Hapoel and returned to Elitzur Ashkelon for a second stint with the club. He averaged 16 points, 7 rebounds and 3 assists per game during the 2009–10 season. He then signed for Pinar Karşıyaka of the Turkish Basketball Super League and played 7 league games (13 points, 4.7 rebounds, 2.7 assists) and 4 games in the 2010–11 FIBA EuroChallenge (2 in the qualifying rounds and 2 in the regular season) before leaving the team in December 2010.

In late 2011 he participated in the Liga Uruguaya de Básquetbol with Defensor Sporting, and was later cut during the season after 3 games. He signed for Mersin BB in January 2012, and played 15 games during the 2011–12 Turkish Basketball League, averaging 16.9 points, 6.7 rebounds and 3.2 assists per game. In 2012 he played 9 games between June and July for the Powerade Tigers during the 2012 PBA Governors' Cup. He returned to Mersin for the 2011–12 Turkish Basketball League, averaging 12.5 points and 6.1 rebounds over 11 appearances. After being inactive for the 2013–14 season, he briefly played for Ankara DSİ in the Turkish Basketball First League, the second tier of Turkish basketball, appearing in 2 games (2 points and 4 rebounds per game).
