= Basketball at the 1998 Asian Games – Men's tournament =

Men at the 1998 Asian Games
- Venue: Thammasat Gymnasium 1 Suphan Buri Provincial Gymnasium
- Date: 8–19 December 1998
- Nations: 12

Medalists
gold medal	China
silver medal	South Korea
bronze medal	Philippines

The 1998 Men's Asian Games Basketball Tournament was held in Thailand from 8 to 19 December 1998.

== Results ==
=== Preliminary round ===
==== Group A ====
Pos	Team	Pld	W	L	PF	PA	PD	Pts	Qualification
1	China	2	2	0	219	100	+119	4	Quarterfinals
2	Thailand	2	1	1	130	178	−48	3	Quarterfinals
3	Hong Kong	2	0	2	111	182	−71	2	Classification 9th–12th

Source: Results

8 December

China	105–47	Hong Kong

Thammasat Gymnasium 1, Bangkok

10 December

Hong Kong	64–77	Thailand

Thammasat Gymnasium 1, Bangkok

12 December

Thailand	53–114	China

Thammasat Gymnasium 1, Bangkok

==== Group B ====
Pos	Team	Pld	W	L	PF	PA	PD	Pts	Qualification
1	South Korea	2	2	0	167	154	+13	4	Quarterfinals
2	Iran	2	1	1	157	162	−5	3	Quarterfinals
3	Uzbekistan	2	0	2	157	165	−8	2	Classification 9th–12th

Source: Results

8 December

Iran	75–84	South Korea

9 December

Uzbekistan	78–82	Iran

10 December

South Korea	83–79	Uzbekistan

==== Group C ====
Pos	Team	Pld	W	L	PF	PA	PD	Pts	Qualification
1	Chinese Taipei	2	2	0	162	117	+45	4	Quarterfinals
2	United Arab Emirates	2	1	1	129	164	−35	3	Quarterfinals
3	Japan	2	0	2	137	147	−10	2	Classification 9th–12th

Source: Results

8 December

Japan	74–75	United Arab Emirates

Thammasat Gymnasium 1, Bangkok

10 December

United Arab Emirates	54–90	Chinese Taipei

Thammasat Gymnasium 1, Bangkok

12 December

Chinese Taipei	72–63	Japan

Thammasat Gymnasium 1, Bangkok

==== Group D ====
Pos	Team	Pld	W	L	PF	PA	PD	Pts	Qualification
1	Philippines	2	2	0	144	102	+42	4	Quarterfinals
2	Kazakhstan	2	1	1	129	103	+26	3	Quarterfinals
3	Kyrgyzstan	2	0	2	100	168	−68	2	Classification 9th–12th

Source: Results

8 December

Philippines	53–52	Kazakhstan

Provincial Gymnasium, Suphan Buri

9 December

Kyrgyzstan	50–91	Philippines

Provincial Gymnasium, Suphan Buri

10 December

Kazakhstan	77–50	Kyrgyzstan

Provincial Gymnasium, Suphan Buri

=== Classification 9th–12th ===
Pos	Team	Pld	W	L	PF	PA	PD	Pts
1	Uzbekistan	3	3	0	253	180	+73	6
2	Japan	3	2	1	226	205	+21	5
3	Hong Kong	3	1	2	201	230	−29	4
4	Kyrgyzstan	3	0	3	182	247	−65	3

Source: Results

13 December

Japan	80–57	Kyrgyzstan

14 December

Hong Kong	74–71	Kyrgyzstan

15 December

Uzbekistan	79–60	Hong Kong

16 December

Uzbekistan	93–54	Kyrgyzstan

16 December

Hong Kong	67–80	Japan

17 December

Uzbekistan	81–66	Japan

=== Quarterfinals ===
==== Group I ====
Pos	Team	Pld	W	L	PF	PA	PD	Pts	Qualification
1	China	3	3	0	311	200	+111	6	Semifinals
2	Kazakhstan	3	2	1	186	209	−23	5	Semifinals
3	Chinese Taipei	3	1	2	193	253	−60	4	5th place game
4	Iran	3	0	3	225	253	−28	3	7th place game

Source: Results

14 December

China	106–86	Iran

Thammasat Gymnasium 1, Bangkok

14 December

Chinese Taipei	48–70	Kazakhstan

Thammasat Gymnasium 1, Bangkok

15 December

Kazakhstan	55–106	China

Thammasat Gymnasium 1, Bangkok

15 December

Iran	84–86 (OT)	Chinese Taipei

Thammasat Gymnasium 1, Bangkok

16 December

Iran	55–61	Kazakhstan

Thammasat Gymnasium 1, Bangkok

16 December

China	99–59	Chinese Taipei

Thammasat Gymnasium 1, Bangkok

==== Group II ====
Pos	Team	Pld	W	L	PF	PA	PD	Pts	Qualification
1	South Korea	3	3	0	307	205	+102	6	Semifinals
2	Philippines	3	2	1	262	220	+42	5	Semifinals
3	Thailand	3	1	2	204	246	−42	4	5th place game
4	United Arab Emirates	3	0	3	170	272	−102	3	7th place game

Source: Results

14 December

United Arab Emirates	57–93	Philippines

Thammasat Gymnasium 1, Bangkok

14 December

Thailand	71–98	South Korea

Thammasat Gymnasium 1, Bangkok

15 December

South Korea	106–51	United Arab Emirates

Thammasat Gymnasium 1, Bangkok

15 December

Philippines	86–60	Thailand

Thammasat Gymnasium 1, Bangkok

16 December

South Korea	103–83	Philippines

Thammasat Gymnasium 1, Bangkok

16 December

Thailand	73–62	United Arab Emirates

Thammasat Gymnasium 1, Bangkok

=== Classification 5th–8th ===
==== 7th place game ====
17 December

Iran	70–50	United Arab Emirates

==== 5th place game ====
17 December

Chinese Taipei	88–53	Thailand

=== Final round ===
Semifinals
18 December
China	82
Philippines	73
18 December
Kazakhstan	64
South Korea	101

Gold medal game
19 December
China	112
South Korea	92
Bronze medal game
19 December
Philippines	73
Kazakhstan	68

==== Semifinals ====
18 December

China	82–73	Philippines
Scoring by half: 44–32, 38–41

Thammasat Gymnasium 1, Bangkok

18 December

Kazakhstan	64–101	South Korea

Thammasat Gymnasium 1, Bangkok

==== Bronze medal game ====
19 December

Philippines	73–68	Kazakhstan
Scoring by half: 36–36, 37–32

Thammasat Gymnasium 1, Bangkok

==== Gold medal game ====
19 December

China	112–92	South Korea
Scoring by half: 59–43, 53–49

Thammasat Gymnasium 1, Bangkok

== Final standing ==
Rank	Team	Pld	W	L
1st place, gold medalist(s)	China	7	7	0
2nd place, silver medalist(s)	South Korea	7	6	1
3rd place, bronze medalist(s)	Philippines	7	5	2
4	Kazakhstan	7	3	4
5	Chinese Taipei	6	4	2
6	Thailand	6	2	4
7	Iran	6	2	4
8	United Arab Emirates	6	1	5
9	Uzbekistan	5	3	2
10	Japan	5	2	3
11	Hong Kong	5	1	4
12	Kyrgyzstan	5	0	5
