= 2002–03 Iranian Basketball Super League =

The following is the final results of the Iran Super League 2002/03 basketball season.

== Regular season ==
Rank	Team	Pld	W	L	Pts
1	Sanam Tehran	18	16	2	34
2	Iran Nara Tehran	18	14	4	32
3	Paykan Tehran	18	14	4	32
4	Zob Ahan Isfahan	18	13	5	31
5	Shahrdari Gorgan	18	10	8	28
6	Petrochimi Bandar Imam	18	7	11	25
7	Homa Tehran	18	7	11	25
8	Hesa Isfahan	18	5	13	23
9	Farsh Mashhad	18	3	15	21
10	Gol Gohar Sirjan	18	1	17	19

- Farsh and Gol Gohar relegated to Division 1.

== Playoffs ==
Semi-finals
1	Sanam	80	90	81
4	Zob Ahan	88	86	75
3	Paykan	57	63	–
2	Iran Nara	67	73	–

Final
1	Sanam	96	101	–
2	Iran Nara	80	87	–
3rd place
4	Zob Ahan	69	87	–
3	Paykan	54	54	–

- Sanam qualified to WABA Champions Cup 2004.

== All-Superleague team ==
All-Superleague 1st team

- Javad Davari (Zob Ahan)
- Iman Zandi (Zob Ahan)
- Pouya Tajik (Paykan)
- Samad Nikkhah Bahrami (Sanam)
- Behzad Afradi (Sanam)

All-Superleague 2nd team

- Mohammad Reza Eslami (Paykan)
- Mohammad Inanloo (Homa)
- Mahmoud Khosravi (Sanam)
- Saman Veisi (Sanam)
- Karam Ahmadian (Sanam)
