= Ararat Tehran BC =

Iranian basketball club based in Tehran, Iran

Ararat Tehran
- Leagues: Iranian Division 1
- Founded: 1944
- Arena: Ararat Stadium
- Location: Tehran, Iran
- Team colors: White and Red
- Championships: –
- Website: www.araratorg.org
Home	Away

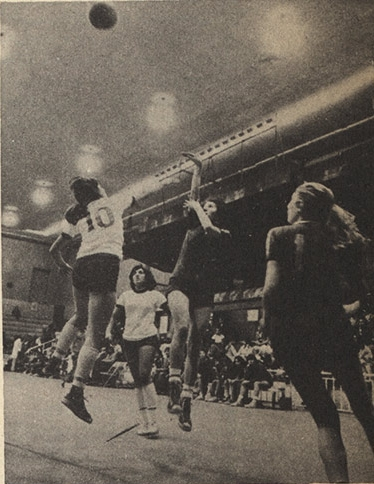
The game between Ararat Tehran and Zayandeh Rood of Isfahan in the first Shahbanu Cup. Mari Azizian from Ararat (black) throwing the ball and defender Mahin Shivai (No. 10 of Isfahan), Avalin Avakian from Ararat and Sholeh Mahoutian (former swimmer of the national team) from Isfahan are also watching the ball. November 1975.

Ararat Tehran Basketball Club is an Iranian professional basketball club based in Tehran, Iran.

== Tournament records ==
=== Iranian Super League ===
- 2007–08: 9th place
- 2008–09: 12th place

== Notable former players ==
- (Nigeria) Julius Nwosu
