= 2000 ABC Under-20 Championship =

2000 FIBA Asia U-20 Championship
3rd Asian Basketball Championship

Tournament details
- Host country: Qatar
- Dates: August 22–30
- Teams: 14
- Venue(s): 1 (in 1 host city)

Final positions
- Champions: Qatar (1st title)

Tournament statistics
- MVP: (Qatar) Yasseen Ismail

The ABC Under-20 Championship 2000 is the 3rd edition of the International Basketball Federation FIBA Asia's championship for young men basketball. The games were held at Doha from August 22–30, 2000.

== Preliminary round ==
=== Group A ===
Team	Pld	W	L	PF	PA	PD	Pts
South Korea	2	2	0	227	158	+69	4
India	2	1	1	172	176	−4	3
Malaysia	2	0	2	142	207	−65	2

August 22
12:30

South Korea	108–84	India
Scoring by half: 57–44, 51–40

Khalifa Hall, Doha

August 23
10:45

India	88–68	Malaysia
Scoring by half: 37–33, 51–35

Khalifa Hall, Doha

August 24
9:00

Malaysia	74–119	South Korea
Scoring by half: 37–69, 37–50

Khalifa Hall, Doha

=== Group B ===
Team	Pld	W	L	PF	PA	PD	Pts
Qatar	3	3	0	242	184	+58	6
China	3	2	1	264	231	+33	5
Kuwait	3	1	2	234	240	−6	4
Bahrain	3	0	3	166	251	−85	3

August 22
9:00

China	101–86	Kuwait
Scoring by half: 41–42, 60–44

Khalifa Hall, Doha

August 22
20:30

Qatar	77–47	Bahrain
Scoring by half: 44–22, 33–25

Khalifa Hall, Doha

August 23
12:30

Bahrain	58–85	Kuwait
Scoring by half: 29–59, 29–26

Khalifa Hall, Doha

August 23
19:30

China	74–84	Qatar
Scoring by half: 42–45, 32–39

Khalifa Hall, Doha

August 24
16:00

Bahrain	61–89	China
Scoring by half: 25–48, 36–41

Khalifa Hall, Doha

August 24
19:30

Kuwait	63–81	Qatar
Scoring by half: 28–44, 35–37

Khalifa Hall, Doha

=== Group C ===
Team	Pld	W	L	PF	PA	PD	Pts	Tiebreaker
Syria	3	2	1	223	196	+27	5	1–1 / 1.102
Iran	3	2	1	228	222	+6	5	1–1 / 1.012
Kazakhstan	3	2	1	219	231	−12	5	1–1 / 0.915
United Arab Emirates	3	0	3	207	228	−21	3	

August 22
10:45

Kazakhstan	99–95 (OT)	Iran
Scoring by half: 44–53, 40–31 Overtime: 15–11

Khalifa Hall, Doha

August 22
16:00

United Arab Emirates	78–93	Syria
Scoring by half: 31–46, 47–47

Khalifa Hall, Doha

August 23
9:00

Iran	66–62	United Arab Emirates
Scoring by half: 36–35, 30–27

Khalifa Hall, Doha

August 23
17:45

Syria	69–51	Kazakhstan
Scoring by half: 42–27, 27–24

Khalifa Hall, Doha

August 24
12:30

Kazakhstan	69–67	United Arab Emirates
Scoring by half: 42–47, 27–20

Khalifa Hall, Doha

August 24
17:45

Iran	67–61	Syria
Scoring by half: 37–39, 30–22

Khalifa Hall, Doha

=== Group D ===
Team	Pld	W	L	PF	PA	PD	Pts
Japan	2	2	0	179	99	+80	4
Philippines	2	1	1	150	131	+19	3
Sri Lanka	2	0	2	88	187	−99	2

August 22
17:45

Philippines	87–52	Sri Lanka
Scoring by half: 47–17, 40–35

Khalifa Hall, Doha

August 23
16:00

Japan	79–63	Philippines
Scoring by half: 44–34, 35–29

Khalifa Hall, Doha

August 24
10:45

Sri Lanka	36–100	Japan
Scoring by half: 16–51, 20–49

Khalifa Hall, Doha

== Quarterfinals ==
=== Group I ===
Team	Pld	W	L	PF	PA	PD	Pts	Tiebreaker
South Korea	3	2	1	284	250	+34	5	1–1 / 1.121
China	3	2	1	266	249	+17	5	1–1 / 1.062
Syria	3	2	1	212	232	−20	5	1–1 / 0.815
Philippines	3	0	3	222	253	−31	3	

August 25
14:15

South Korea	95–109	China
Scoring by half: 55–61, 40–48

Khalifa Hall, Doha

August 25
17:45

Syria	75–64	Philippines
Scoring by half: 34–38, 41–26

Khalifa Hall, Doha

August 26
12:30

China	79–82	Syria
Scoring by half: 38–41, 41–41

Khalifa Hall, Doha

August 26
16:00

Philippines	86–100	South Korea
Scoring by half: 40–57, 46–43

Khalifa Hall, Doha

August 27
17:45

Philippines	72–78	China
Scoring by half: 30–40, 42–38

Khalifa Hall, Doha

August 27
19:30

South Korea	89–55	Syria
Scoring by half: 48–28, 41–27

Khalifa Hall, Doha

=== Group II ===
Team	Pld	W	L	PF	PA	PD	Pts
Qatar	3	3	0	237	175	+62	6
Japan	3	2	1	241	233	+8	5
Iran	3	1	2	203	226	−23	4
India	3	0	3	235	282	−47	3

August 25
16:00

India	66–89	Qatar
Scoring by half: 31–51, 35–38

Khalifa Hall, Doha

August 25
19:30

Japan	73–69	Iran
Scoring by half: 46–35, 27–34

Khalifa Hall, Doha

August 26
17:45

Iran	89–88	India
Scoring by half: 41–48, 48–40

Khalifa Hall, Doha

August 26
19:30

Qatar	83–64	Japan
Scoring by half: 49–22, 34–42

Khalifa Hall, Doha

August 27
12:30

Qatar	65–45	Iran
Scoring by half: 40–25, 25–20

Khalifa Hall, Doha

August 27
16:00

India	81–104	Japan
Scoring by half: 47–57, 34–47

Khalifa Hall, Doha

=== Group III ===
Team	Pld	W	L	PF	PA	PD	Pts	Tiebreaker
Kazakhstan	2	1	1	148	137	+11	3	1–1 / 1.080
Bahrain	2	1	1	148	142	+6	3	1–1 / 1.042
Malaysia	2	1	1	128	145	−17	3	1–1 / 0.883

August 25
9:00

Malaysia	68–66	Kazakhstan
Scoring by half: 37–38, 31–28

Khalifa Hall, Doha

August 26
10:45

Kazakhstan	82–69	Bahrain
Scoring by half: 41–28, 41–41

Khalifa Hall, Doha

August 27
9:00

Bahrain	79–60	Malaysia
Scoring by half: 32–33, 47–27

Khalifa Hall, Doha

=== Group IV ===
Team	Pld	W	L	PF	PA	PD	Pts
United Arab Emirates	2	2	0	156	139	+17	4
Kuwait	2	1	1	165	148	+17	3
Sri Lanka	2	0	2	120	154	−34	2

August 25
10:45

Kuwait	82–64	Sri Lanka
Scoring by half: 40–33, 42–31

Khalifa Hall, Doha

August 26
9:00

Sri Lanka	56–72	United Arab Emirates
Scoring by half: 24–39, 32–33

Khalifa Hall, Doha

August 27
10:45

United Arab Emirates	84–83	Kuwait
Scoring by half: 40–35, 44–48

Khalifa Hall, Doha

== Classification 5th–14th ==
=== 13th place ===
August 28
9:00

Malaysia	77–40	Sri Lanka
Scoring by half: 52–20, 25–20

Khalifa Hall, Doha

=== 11th place ===
August 28
10:45

Bahrain	82–85	Kuwait
Scoring by half: 41–30, 41–55

Khalifa Hall, Doha

=== 9th place ===
August 28
12:30

Kazakhstan	98–82	United Arab Emirates
Scoring by half: 56–54, 42–28

Khalifa Hall, Doha

=== 7th place ===
August 29
9:00

Philippines	83–74	India
Scoring by half: 47–33, 36–41

Khalifa Hall, Doha

=== 5th place ===
August 29
10:45

Syria	68–79	Iran
Scoring by half: 34–39, 34–40

Khalifa Hall, Doha

== Final round ==
Semifinals
August 29
South Korea	94
Japan	84
August 29
China	60
Qatar	74

Final
August 30
South Korea	75
Qatar (OT)	89
3rd place
August 30
Japan	83
China	97

=== Semifinals ===
August 29
17:45

South Korea	94–84	Japan
Scoring by half: 46–48, 48–36

Khalifa Hall, Doha

August 29
19:30

China	60–74	Qatar
Scoring by half: 38–28, 22–46

Khalifa Hall, Doha

=== 3rd place ===
August 30
17:45

Japan	83–97	China
Scoring by half: 35–49, 48–48

Khalifa Hall, Doha

=== Final ===
August 30
19:30

South Korea	75–89 (OT)	Qatar
Scoring by half: 30–30, 35–35 Overtime: 10–24

Khalifa Hall, Doha

== Final standing ==
Qualified for the 2001 FIBA Under-21 World Championship

Rank	Team	Record
1st place, gold medalist(s)	Qatar	8–0
2nd place, silver medalist(s)	South Korea	5–2
3rd place, bronze medalist(s)	China	5–3
4	Japan	4–3
5	Iran	4–3
6	Syria	4–3
7	Philippines	2–4
8	India	1–5
9	Kazakhstan	4–2
10	United Arab Emirates	2–4
11	Kuwait	3–3
12	Bahrain	1–5
13	Malaysia	2–3
14	Sri Lanka	0–5

== Awards ==
2000 Asian Under-20 champions

Qatar
First title

- Most Valuable Player: (Qatar) Yasseen Ismail
- Best Scorer: (Qatar) Yasseen Ismail
- Best 3-Pointer: (South Korea) Bang Sung-Yoon
- Best Coach: (South Korea) Choi Bu-Yung
