= 2004 FIBA Asia Under-20 Championship =

Asia's young men's basketball championship

2004 FIBA Asia U-20 Championship
4th Asian Basketball Championship

Tournament details
- Host country: Iran
- Dates: September 29 – October 8
- Teams: 15
- Venue(s): 1 (in 1 host city)

Final positions
- Champions: Iran (1st title)

The FIBA Asia Under-20 Championship 2004 is the 4th edition of the FIBA Asia's young men championship for basketball. The games were held at Tehran, Iran

== Qualification ==
According to the FIBA Asia rules, each zone had two places, and the hosts (Iran) and holders (Qatar) were automatically qualified. The other four places are allocated to the zones according to performance in the 2000 ABC Under-20 Championship.

East Asia (2+3)	Gulf (1+2)	Middle Asia (2)	Southeast Asia (2)	West Asia (1+2+1)
China	Qatar	India	Malaysia	Iran
Chinese Taipei	Kuwait	Kazakhstan	Philippines	Iraq
Hong Kong	Saudi Arabia			Jordan
Japan				Lebanon
South Korea				

== Draw ==
Group A	Group B	Group C	Group D
Qatar; Kuwait; ~~Hong Kong~~ * Iran	South Korea; Saudi Arabia; Kazakhstan; Lebanon	China; Jordan; Malaysia; Philippines	Japan; India; Chinese Taipei; Iraq

* Withdrew

== Preliminary round ==
=== Group A ===
Team	Pld	W	L	PF	PA	PD	Pts
Iran	2	2	0	150	115	+35	4
Qatar	2	1	1	155	114	+41	3
Kuwait	2	0	2	106	182	−76	2

September 29
17:00

Qatar	60–63	Iran
Scoring by quarter: 15–10, 16–18, 13–20, 16–15

Azadi Basketball Hall, Tehran

September 30
15:00

Kuwait	51–95	Qatar
Scoring by quarter: 14–27, 10–11, 17–33, 10–24

Azadi Basketball Hall, Tehran

October 1
17:00

Kuwait	55–87	Iran
Scoring by quarter: 14–26, 13–19, 16–18, 12–24

Azadi Basketball Hall, Tehran

=== Group B ===
Team	Pld	W	L	PF	PA	PD	Pts	Tiebreaker
South Korea	3	3	0	267	201	+66	6	
Lebanon	3	1	2	209	227	−18	4	1–1 / 1.051
Kazakhstan	3	1	2	218	240	−22	4	1–1 / 0.993
Saudi Arabia	3	1	2	199	225	−26	4	1–1 / 0.959

September 29
11:00

Saudi Arabia	72–70	Kazakhstan
Scoring by quarter: 15–22, 11–19, 22–12, 24–17

Azadi Basketball Hall, Tehran

September 29
14:00

South Korea	89–64	Lebanon
Scoring by quarter: 23–14, 24–18, 22–20, 20–12

Azadi Basketball Hall, Tehran

September 30
9:00

Kazakhstan	78–99	South Korea
Scoring by quarter: 17–22, 21–21, 18–25, 22–31

Azadi Basketball Hall, Tehran

September 30
17:00

Lebanon	76–68	Saudi Arabia
Scoring by quarter: 18–13, 21–18, 13–15, 24–22

Azadi Basketball Hall, Tehran

October 2
13:00

South Korea	79–59	Saudi Arabia
Scoring by quarter: 18–17, 18–11, 24–12, 19–19

Azadi Basketball Hall, Tehran

October 2
17:00

Kazakhstan	70–69	Lebanon
Scoring by quarter: 19–17, 20–20, 19–13, 12–19

Azadi Basketball Hall, Tehran

=== Group C ===
Team	Pld	W	L	PF	PA	PD	Pts
China	3	3	0	317	176	+141	6
Jordan	3	2	1	223	227	−4	5
Malaysia	3	1	2	226	272	−46	4
Philippines	3	0	3	226	317	−91	3

September 29
9:00

Jordan	72–66	Malaysia
Scoring by quarter: 20–18, 17–13, 13–17, 22–18

Azadi Basketball Hall, Tehran

September 29
19:00

China	124–58	Philippines
Scoring by quarter: 38–18, 29–10, 28–14, 29–16

Azadi Basketball Hall, Tehran

October 1
9:00

Malaysia	56–103	China
Scoring by quarter: 14–29, 14–22, 6–25, 22–27

Azadi Basketball Hall, Tehran

October 1
11:00

Philippines	71–89	Jordan
Scoring by quarter: 23–18, 10–29, 19–28, 19–14

Azadi Basketball Hall, Tehran

October 2
11:00

Malaysia	104–97	Philippines
Scoring by quarter: 16–12, 35–24, 19–25, 34–36

Azadi Basketball Hall, Tehran

October 2
15:00

China	90–62	Jordan
Scoring by quarter: 21–19, 22–15, 25–13, 22–15

Azadi Basketball Hall, Tehran

=== Group D ===
Team	Pld	W	L	PF	PA	PD	Pts
Chinese Taipei	3	3	0	253	217	+36	6
Iraq	3	2	1	215	193	+22	5
Japan	3	1	2	228	236	−8	4
India	3	0	3	215	265	−50	3

September 30
11:00

Japan	57–67	Iraq
Scoring by quarter: 17–20, 11–17, 12–18, 17–12

Azadi Basketball Hall, Tehran

September 30
19:00

India	71–92	Chinese Taipei
Scoring by quarter: 15–21, 20–19, 13–30, 23–22

Azadi Basketball Hall, Tehran

October 1
15:00

Iraq	81–61	India
Scoring by quarter: 23–14, 23–11, 18–21, 17–15

Azadi Basketball Hall, Tehran

October 1
19:00.

Chinese Taipei	86–79	Japan
Scoring by quarter: 24–14, 15–13, 25–18, 22–34

Azadi Basketball Hall, Tehran

October 2
9:00

Japan	92–83	India
Scoring by quarter: 25–12, 17–26, 26–30, 24–15

Azadi Basketball Hall, Tehran

October 2
19:00

Chinese Taipei	75–67	Iraq
Scoring by quarter: 24–14, 17–21, 19–16, 15–16

Azadi Basketball Hall, Tehran

== Quarterfinals ==
=== Group I ===
Team	Pld	W	L	PF	PA	PD	Pts
China	3	3	0	264	212	+52	6
Iran	3	2	1	219	193	+26	5
Lebanon	3	1	2	197	221	−24	4
Iraq	3	0	3	154	208	−54	3

October 3
15:00

Lebanon	83–100	China
Scoring by quarter: 21–29, 13–19, 18–22, 22–31

Azadi Basketball Hall, Tehran

October 3
17:00

Iran	67–56	Iraq
Scoring by quarter: 18–13, 15–16, 17–10, 17–17

Azadi Basketball Hall, Tehran

October 4
15:00

Iraq	40–62	Lebanon
Scoring by quarter: 10–13, 6–13, 11–18, 13–18

Azadi Basketball Hall, Tehran

October 4
17:00

China	85–71	Iran
Scoring by quarter: 14–20, 15–18, 28–18, 28–15

Azadi Basketball Hall, Tehran

October 5
17:00

Iran	81–52	Lebanon
Scoring by quarter: 15–15, 20–9, 25–9, 21–19

Azadi Basketball Hall, Tehran

October 6
15:00

China	79–58	Iraq
Scoring by quarter: 24–16, 21–8, 20–15, 14–19

Azadi Basketball Hall, Tehran

=== Group II ===
Team	Pld	W	L	PF	PA	PD	Pts	Tiebreaker
Qatar	3	2	1	255	241	+14	5	1–0
South Korea	3	2	1	234	196	+38	5	0–1
Chinese Taipei	3	1	2	234	234	0	4	1–0
Jordan	3	1	2	208	260	−52	4	0–1

October 3
19:00

Qatar	103–92 (2OT)	Chinese Taipei
Scoring by quarter: 19–18, 17–26, 21–15, 20–18, Overtime: 10–10, 16–5

Azadi Basketball Hall, Tehran

October 4
19:00

South Korea	95–67	Jordan
Scoring by quarter: 22–18, 34–25, 26–11, 13–13

Azadi Basketball Hall, Tehran

October 5
15:00

Jordan	81–78	Qatar
Scoring by quarter: 15–22, 18–9, 16–25, 32–22

Azadi Basketball Hall, Tehran

October 5
19:00

Chinese Taipei	55–71	South Korea
Scoring by quarter: 7–13, 18–24, 10–19, 20–15

Azadi Basketball Hall, Tehran

October 6
17:00

Qatar	74–68	South Korea
Scoring by quarter: 16–19, 21–19, 17–20, 20–10

Azadi Basketball Hall, Tehran

October 6
19:00

Jordan	60–87	Chinese Taipei
Scoring by quarter: 17–20, 11–20, 13–18, 19–29

Azadi Basketball Hall, Tehran

=== Group III ===
Team	Pld	W	L	PF	PA	PD	Pts
Malaysia	3	3	0	259	221	+38	6
Saudi Arabia	3	2	1	222	205	+17	5
Kuwait	3	1	2	197	217	−20	4
India	3	0	3	235	270	−35	3

October 3
9:00

Kuwait	72–69	India
Scoring by quarter: 17–12, 26–28, 15–14, 14–15

Azadi Basketball Hall, Tehran

October 3
11:00

Saudi Arabia	66–69	Malaysia
Scoring by quarter: 18–20, 12–12, 21–18, 18–16

Azadi Basketball Hall, Tehran

October 4
11:00

Malaysia	78–61	Kuwait
Scoring by quarter: 18–18, 23–13, 17–15, 20–15

Azadi Basketball Hall, Tehran

October 4
13:00

India	72–86	Saudi Arabia
Scoring by quarter: 22–18, 14–22, 20–25, 16–21

Azadi Basketball Hall, Tehran

October 5
11:00

Kuwait	64–70	Saudi Arabia
Scoring by quarter: 12–13, 22–19, 12–20, 18–18

Azadi Basketball Hall, Tehran

October 6
9:00

Malaysia	112–94	India
Scoring by quarter: 20–23, 23–26, 33–22, 36–23

Azadi Basketball Hall, Tehran

=== Group IV ===
Team	Pld	W	L	PF	PA	PD	Pts
Kazakhstan	2	2	0	163	130	+33	4
Philippines	2	1	1	140	144	−4	3
Japan	2	0	2	140	169	−29	2

October 4
9:00

Kazakhstan	74–60	Philippines
Scoring by quarter: 19–17, 21–13, 14–14, 20–16

Azadi Basketball Hall, Tehran

October 5
9:00

Japan	70–89	Kazakhstan
Scoring by quarter: 24–25, 24–21, 24–19, 23–21

Azadi Basketball Hall, Tehran

October 6
11:00

Philippines	80–70	Japan
Scoring by quarter: 19–17, 16–18, 18–20, 24–24

Azadi Basketball Hall, Tehran

== Classification 9th–14th ==
=== 13th place ===
October 7
11:00

Kuwait	60–79	Japan
Scoring by quarter: 20–13, 10–26, 15–22, 15–18

Azadi Basketball Hall, Tehran

=== 11th place ===
October 8
11:00

Saudi Arabia	82–57	Philippines
Scoring by quarter: 25–16, 16–15, 19–16, 22–10

Azadi Basketball Hall, Tehran

=== 9th place ===
October 7
9:00

Malaysia	74–88	Kazakhstan
Scoring by quarter: 14–20, 17–24, 17–21, 26–23

Azadi Basketball Hall, Tehran

== Classification 5th–8th ==
Semifinals
October 7
Chinese Taipei	60
Iraq	52
October 7
Lebanon	62
Jordan	69

5th place
October 8
Chinese Taipei	67
Jordan	55
7th place
October 8
Iraq	69
Lebanon	42

=== Semifinals ===
October 7
13:00

Chinese Taipei	60–52	Iraq
Scoring by quarter: 21–10, 17–13, 11–16, 11–13

Azadi Basketball Hall, Tehran

October 7
15:00

Lebanon	62–69	Jordan
Scoring by quarter: 14–6, 13–23, 14–19, 21–21

Azadi Basketball Hall, Tehran

=== 7th place ===
October 8
13:00

Iraq	69–42	Lebanon
Scoring by quarter: 18–14, 18–11, 13–10, 20–7

Azadi Basketball Hall, Tehran

=== 5th place ===
October 8
15:00

Chinese Taipei	67–55	Jordan
Scoring by quarter: 19–13, 13–16, 20–13, 15–13

Azadi Basketball Hall, Tehran

== Final round ==
Semifinals
October 7
Qatar	46
Iran	57
October 7
China	94
South Korea	83

Final
October 8
Iran	75
China	50
3rd place
October 8
Qatar	67
South Korea	65

=== Semifinals ===
October 7
17:00

Qatar	46–57	Iran
Scoring by quarter: 12–12, 9–14, 14–13, 11–18

Azadi Basketball Hall, Tehran

October 7
19:00

China	94–83	South Korea
Scoring by quarter: 37–26, 13–16, 19–20, 25–21

Azadi Basketball Hall, Tehran

=== 3rd place ===
October 8
17:00

Qatar	67–65	South Korea
Scoring by quarter: 17–16, 22–18, 13–19, 15–12

Azadi Basketball Hall, Tehran

=== Final ===
October 8
19:00

Iran	75–50	China
Scoring by quarter: 17–6, 21–19, 20–14, 17–11

Azadi Basketball Hall, Tehran

== Final standing ==
Qualified for the 2005 FIBA Under-21 World Championship

Rank	Team	Record
1st place, gold medalist(s)	Iran	6–1
2nd place, silver medalist(s)	China	7–1
3rd place, bronze medalist(s)	Qatar	4–3
4	South Korea	5–3
5	Chinese Taipei	6–2
6	Jordan	4–4
7	Iraq	3–5
8	Lebanon	2–6
9	Kazakhstan	4–2
10	Malaysia	4–3
11	Saudi Arabia	4–3
12	Philippines	1–5
13	Japan	2–4
14	Kuwait	1–5
15	India	0–6

== Awards ==
2004 Asian Under-20 champions

Iran
First title
