= FIBA Asia Under-20 Championship =

Basketball competition in Asia

The FIBA Asia Under-20 Championship refers to the under-20 championship for basketball in the International Basketball Federation's FIBA Asia zone. The event started in 1992. It was formerly the Asian Basketball Confederation 22 & Under Championship, before the age limit was lowered to the current 20 in 2002. It was also formerly known as the Asian Basketball Confederation Championship for Young Men. The winners compete in the FIBA Under-21 World Championship. FIBA no longer hold world championships for this age group.

== Summary ==
Year	Host	Final			Third-place game		
Year	Host	Champion	Score	Second Place	Third Place	Score	Fourth Place
1993; Details	Hong Kong	Chinese Taipei		South Korea	Japan		Philippines
1996; Details	(China); Shanghai	South Korea	79–71	China	Saudi Arabia	68–54	Kazakhstan
2000; Details	(Qatar); Doha	Qatar	89–75; OT	South Korea	China	97–83	Japan
2004; Details	(Iran); Tehran	Iran	75–50	China	Qatar	67–65	South Korea

== Medal table ==
Rank	Nation	Gold	Silver	Bronze	Total
1	South Korea	1	2	0	3
2	Qatar	1	0	1	2
3	Chinese Taipei	1	0	0	1
3	Iran	1	0	0	1
5	China	0	2	1	3
6	Japan	0	0	1	1
6	Saudi Arabia	0	0	1	1
Totals (7 entries)		4	4	4	12

== Participating nations ==
Nation	(Hong Kong) 1993	(China) 1996	(Qatar) 2000	(Iran) 2004	Years
Bahrain			12th		1
China		2nd	3rd	2nd	3
Chinese Taipei	1st	6th		5th	3
Hong Kong	7th	11th			2
India		16th	8th	15th	3
Indonesia	5th	12th			2
Iran		8th	5th	1st	3
Iraq				7th	1
Japan	3rd	7th	4th	13th	4
Jordan	6th			6th	2
Kazakhstan		4th	9th	9th	3
Kuwait	9th	10th	11th	14th	4
Kyrgyzstan		14th			1
Lebanon				8th	1
Macau	11th	15th			2
Malaysia	10th	13th	13th	10th	4
Philippines	4th	5th	7th	12th	4
Qatar			1st	3rd	2
Saudi Arabia		3rd		11th	2
Singapore	8th				1
South Korea	2nd	1st	2nd	4th	4
Sri Lanka	12th		14th		2
Syria			6th		1
Thailand		9th			1
United Arab Emirates			10th		1
Total	12	16	14	15	
