= 2003 WABA Champions Cup =

Basketball club tournament

The WABA Champions Cup 2003 was the 6th staging of the WABA Champions Cup, the basketball club tournament of West Asia Basketball Association. The tournament was held in Tehran, Iran between June 11 and June 13. The winner qualify for the Asian Basketball Confederation Champions Cup 2003.

== Standings ==
| Team | Pld | W | L | PF | PA | PD | Pts | Tiebreaker |
|---|---|---|---|---|---|---|---|---|
| (Iran) Sanam Tehran | 3 | 2 | 1 | 235 | 205 | +30 | 5 | 1–1 / 1.163 |
| (Jordan) Arena | 3 | 2 | 1 | 215 | 209 | +6 | 5 | 1–1 / 1.007 |
| (Iran) Zob Ahan Isfahan | 3 | 2 | 1 | 198 | 207 | −9 | 5 | 1–1 / 0.854 |
| (Jordan) Aramex | 3 | 0 | 3 | 215 | 242 | −27 | 3 | |

== Results ==
June 11
16:00

| Aramex (Jordan) | 70–75 | (Jordan) Arena |
Scoring by quarter: 12–14, 21–24, 25–25, 12–12

Azadi Basketball Hall, Tehran

June 11
18:00

| Sanam Tehran (Iran) | 77–50 | (Iran) Zob Ahan Isfahan |
Scoring by quarter: 22–3, 16–17, 23–18, 16–12

Azadi Basketball Hall, Tehran

June 12
16:00

| Zob Ahan Isfahan (Iran) | 75–63 | (Jordan) Aramex |
Scoring by quarter: 18–10, 31–11, 19–17, 7–25

Azadi Basketball Hall, Tehran

June 12
18:00

| Arena (Jordan) | 73–66 | (Iran) Sanam Tehran |
Scoring by quarter: 18–15, 20–18, 14–16, 21–17

Azadi Basketball Hall, Tehran

June 13
16:00

| Sanam Tehran (Iran) | 92–82 | (Jordan) Aramex |
Scoring by quarter: 30–15, 16–14, 28–13, 18–40

Azadi Basketball Hall, Tehran

June 13
18:00

| Zob Ahan Isfahan (Iran) | 73–67 | (Jordan) Arena |
Scoring by quarter: 23–30, 14–16, 10–7, 24–14

Azadi Basketball Hall, Tehran
