= Liga Forward =

Basketball tier in Kyrgyzstan

Liga Forward is the highest tier of basketball in Kyrgyzstan, which began in 1992 when the country became independent from the Soviet Union. It includes teams such as Dank, Tulpar Skafkis and Bishkek Dynamo.

== Teams ==
Team	City	Arena	Established	Joined	Head coach
Berkut Bishkek	Bishkek	Bishkek Arena	1997	1999	(Kyrgyzstan) Andrei Pavstovalov
Bishkek Dynamo	Bishkek	Bishkek Arena	2005	2006	(Kyrgyzstan) Alexandr Dolzhenkov
Dank	Karakol	Vladech Center	1992	1992	(Kyrgyzstan) Artem Khail
DYUSH OSH	Bishkek	Bishkek Arena	1998		(Italy) (United States) Mike Travino
DYUSH Talas	Talas	Dmitr Arena	2009	2010	(Portugal) (Italy) Riccardo Pasternolli
Fire Bishkek	Bishkek	Bishkek Arena	2010	2011	(North Macedonia) Alexandr Djaparova
Kokzhal KNU	Kokzhal	Creekmore Center	1999	1999	(Kazakhstan) Vlacheslav Dmitriyov
Mobile Seti	Balykchy	Balykchy Tatar Box	1992		(Kyrgyzstan) (Kazakhstan) Andreyev Vyacheslav
Naryn Naryn	Naryn	Naryn Central	2012	2013	(Russia) (Kazakhstan) Evgeni Vlatevech
Tulpar Skafkis	Tulpar	The Lake Arena	2008	2009	(Russia) Vladimir Trunov
Zhayil Kara-Balta	Zhayil	Kyrgyzstan Institute of Sport	2004	2005	(Kyrgyzstan) (Tajikistan) RN Begaliev

=== Former teams ===
Team	City	Arena	Joined	Left	Best player
Ala-Too	Koshkol	Koshkol Arena	1992	2013	(Kyrgyzstan) (Costa Rica) Alex Ruiz
Bishkek Lions	Bishkek	Bishkek Arena	1992	1998	(Sicily) Michele Dolquino
Bishkek Slam	Karakol	Vladech Center	1992	1996	(United States) Brent Quabbe
Mars Bishkek	Bishkek	Bishkek Arena	1992	2013	(Kyrgyzstan) Roman Sherokev
Tokmok Tigers	Tokmok	Brent Turner Arena	1994	2007	(Ivory Coast) (The Gambia) Nuki Nuko
