= Pouya Tajik =

Iranian basketball player

Pooya Tajik
No. 4 – Hamyari Shahrdari
- Position: Power forward
- League: Iranian League

Personal information
- Born: September 21, 1980 (age 46) Tehran, Iran
- Listed height: 6 ft 6 3/4 in (2.00 m)
- Listed weight: 215 lb (98 kg)

Career information
- Playing career: 2000–present

Career history
- ?: Peykan
- ?: BEEM
- ?: Azad University
- ?: Hamyari Shahrdari
- Shahrdari Gorgan BC
- Shahrdari Kashan BC

Pouya Tajik
Medal record

Men's basketball

Representing Iran

Asian Games
Bronze medal – third place	2006 Doha	Team

Asian Championship
Gold medal – first place	2009 Tianjin	Team

Pouya Tajik (born September 21, 1980, in Tehran) is a professional Iranian basketball player who currently plays for BEEM Mazandaran BC of the Iranian Super League and also for the Iranian national basketball team. He is a 6-foot-nine-inch power forward

Tajik spent the first several years of his professional career with Paykan Tehran, also of the Iranian Super League. Following the 2006 season, he joined BEEM Mazandaran BC.

Tajik is also a long-time member of the Iran national basketball team. He first played for the team at the ABC Championship 2003 as a 20-year-old and later participated at the FIBA Asia Championship 2005. Although he was not part of the Iranian side that won the 2007 Championship, he rejoined the team for their second consecutive gold medal run at the FIBA Asia Championship 2009. He saw action in eight of nine games off the bench for the Iranians.He retired in year 2016 after almost 20 years of playing basketball. In the spring of 2016 he opened up a Basketball academy and started to teach under 18 young players. In summer of 2017 he was chosen for the Iranian youth national basketball team as assistant coach. Meanwhile, he attended a Basketball coaching school in university of Budapest, Budapest, Hungary. As a head coach, he started his career in Shahrdari Qazvin early in 2020.
