= Iranian Women's Basketball League =

- Most recent season or competition: Iranian Women's Basketball Premier League 2019-2020
- Sport: Basketball
- Founded: 1975
- No. of teams: 10
- Country: (Iran) IRAN
- Continent: FIBA Asia (Asia)
- Most recent champion: Azad University Tehran BC (2022–23)
- Website: Iran Basketball Federation

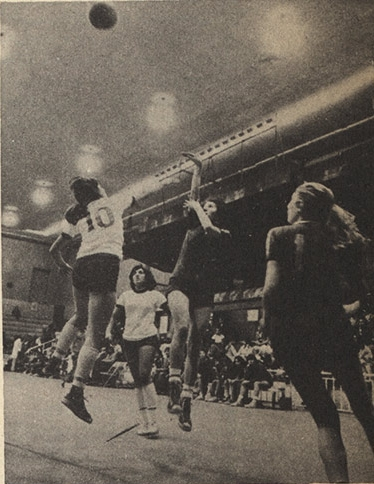
The game between Ararat Tehran and Zayandeh Rood of Isfahan in the first Shahbanu Cup. Mari Azizian from Ararat (black) throwing the ball and defender Mahin Shivai (No. 10 of Isfahan), Avalin Avakian from Ararat and Sholeh Mahoutian (former swimmer of the national team) from Isfahan are also watching the ball. November 1975.

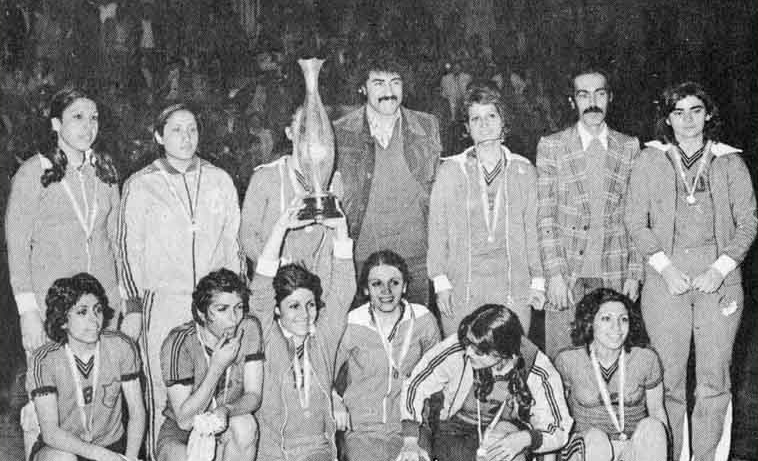
Irana is the champion of the first Iranian women's basketball club championship, the first Shahbanu Cup in the hands of Nina Zargar Saleh, the captain of the Irana club (December 1975).

Iran Women's Basketball (Premier) League is the highest level of national women's basketball competitions in Iran. The country's club championship was held for the first time in 1975 as the Shahbanu Cup, during which the Irana team became the first club to become the champion of Iran's women's basketball clubs. The Shahbanu Cup was held every year until the 1979 revolution, which always ended with Irana winning the championship. After the revolution and about 20 years of hiatus, the women's basketball division one league started in 1999, which was the highest level of club basketball in Iran until 2001. Iran's Women's Premier Basketball League was held in 2001 as the highest level of the country's club league, which has been held annually since then. The team of Chemidor was the champion of the 20th edition of these games in 2021.

In some years (for example, 2013), national women's basketball competitions have been held in four categories: Super League, Premier League, League One and League Two. The top team of the league was held last season.

== Current clubs ==
The 10 teams participating in 2022 season are:

- Shahrdari Gorgan
- Zob Ahan Isfahan
- Gaaz Tehran
- Bahman Group Tehran
- Palayesh Naft Abadan
- Paaz Tehran
- Nikan Tehran
- Sepehrdad Tehran
- Padma Yadak Iranian
- Tiruzh Hayat Kurdistan

== Shahbanu Cup ==
The Shahbanu Cup (The Empress Cup) was the first Iranian women basketball league where clubs from all around the country competed to win the title. This league was abandoned after the Iranian Revolution in 1979.

Season	Champion	Runner-up	Third place
1975	Irana Tehran	Ararat Tehran	
1976	Irana Tehran	Afsar Tehran	Sepahan Isfahan
1977	Irana Tehran	Ararat Tehran	

== The Division One League ==
Season	Champion	Runner-up	Third place
1998	Moghavemat Chekad	Pakvash	Tarbiat Badani Shiraz
1999			
2000			
2001			

== Premier League ==
The premier league founded in 2002 as the highest level of women's basketball leagues in Iran which has been continuously performed ever since.

Season	Champion	Runner-up	Third place
2002	Foolad Sepahan	Azad University	Fajr Sepah
2003			
2004	Peykan Tehran		
2005	Foolad Sepahan	Ararat Tehran	Peykan Tehran
2006	Ararat Tehran	Foolad Sepahan	Naft Tehran
2007	Foolad Sepahan	Ararat Tehran	Naft Tehran
2008	Ararat Tehran	Foolad Sepahan	Naft Tehran
2009	Ararat Tehran	Foolad Sepahan	Sadraye Shiraz
2010	Ararat Tehran	Kesht o Sanat Ghazvin	Foolad Mahan Isfahan
2011	Mehr Amin Ghazvin	Foolad Mahan Isfahan	Gaaz Tehran
2012	Azad University	Macaroni Jahan Ghazvin	Gaaz Tehran
2013	Keshavarz Ghazvin	Ararat Tehran	Shahrdari Bandar Abbas
2014	Ararat Tehran	Gaaz Tehran	Shahrdari Bandar Abbas
2015	Gaaz Tehran	Koosha Sepehr Sabalan	Shahrdari Bandar Abbas
2016	Koosha Sepehr Sabalan	Palayesh Naft Abadan	Gaaz Tehran
2017	Palayesh Naft Abadan	Bahman Group Tehran	Gaaz Tehran
2018	Azad University	Namino Isfahan	Bahman Group Tehran
2019	Bahman Group Tehran	Banovan Gorgan City	Namino Isfahan
2020	Bahman Group Tehran	Mahram Tehran	Narsina Tehran
2021	Chemidor	Bahman Group Tehran	Exon
2022			
2023			

== See also ==
- Iranian Basketball Super League
