= Heyat Basketball Langaroud BC =

Heyat Basketball Langaroud
- Leagues: Iranian Super League
- Arena: 22nd Bahman Stadium
- Location: Langaroud, Iran
- Team colors: Yellow
- Head coach: (Iran) Masoud Ghasemi
- Championships: none
- Website: -

Heyat Basketball Langaroud Basketball Club (formerly known as Shahrdari Langaroud) is an Iranian professional basketball club based in Langaroud, Iran. They compete in the Iranian Basketball Super League.

== Management team ==
Position	Name	Nation
Head Coach	Masoud Ghasemi	(Iran)
