= Tony Madison =

American basketball player

Tony Madison (born 1971) is a retired professional American basketball player who played NCAA basketball for the New Orleans Privateers.

He is most famous for playing in the Lebanese Basketball League for Tadamon Zouk Lebanese basketball club for many seasons. He later played for Champville SC, Al-Riyadi and again Champville SC in the same league. He is regarded as one of the best imports in the Middle East after having played in Lebanon, Saudi Arabia and Iran.

== Career ==
- (United States) University of New Orleans
- (Lebanon) Tadamon Zouk
- (Lebanon) Champville SC
- (Lebanon) Al-Riyadi
- (Saudi Arabia) Al-Ittihad
- (Iran) Mahram Tehran (2007–08)
- (Iran) Petrochimi Bandar Imam (2008–10)
- (Lebanon) Champville SC (2010)
