= Kyrgyzstan men's national basketball team =

Kyrgyzstan
- FIBA ranking: 153 (1 September 2026)
- Joined FIBA: 1992
- FIBA zone: FIBA Asia
- National federation: KBF
- Coach: Juris Vasiļjevs

Olympic Games
- Appearances: None

FIBA World Cup
- Appearances: None

FIBA Asia Cup
- Appearances: 1 (1995)
- Medals: None
Home	Away

The Kyrgyzstan national basketball team is the national Basketball team of Kyrgyzstan, Asia.

The team had its best year in 1995. Then, at the official 1995 Asian Basketball Championship, the team surprisingly finished ahead of favorites such as Iran, Philippines and Jordan.

A prominent player of Kyrgyzstani descent is also Kyranbek Makan who plays for China because he was born and raised there.

== Liga Forward ==
The only league in Kyrgyzstan is Liga Forward which consists of mostly Kyrgyzstan players but also features ex-Kazakhstan internationals and ex-Uzbekistan internationals. Most Kyrgyzstan players start off in Liga Forward but they usually move elsewhere like the National Basketball League (Kazakhstan) or the Division 1 of Uzbekistan.

== Coaches ==
Coach Name	Year From	Year To	Nationality
Evgeni Krystov	1993	1994	Kyrgyzstan
Hamid Lakov	1994	1999	Kyrgyzstan
*Aleksandr Kyrinakov	1999	1999	Kyrgyzstan
Unknown Coach(es)	1999	2007	Kyrgyzstan
Iliya Isakov	2007	present	Kyrgyzstan

== Results ==
=== FIBA Asia Cup ===
Year	Position	Pld	W	L
1960 to 1991	Part of Soviet Union			
(Indonesia) 1993	Did not enter			
(South Korea) 1995	8th place	8	3	5
(Saudi Arabia) 1997	Did not enter			
(Japan) 1999	Did not enter			
(China) 2001	Did not enter			
(China) 2003	Did not enter			
(Qatar) 2005	Did not enter			
(Japan) 2007	Did not enter			
(China) 2009	Did not enter			
(China) 2011	Did not enter			
(Philippines) 2013	Did not enter			
(China) 2015	Did not qualify			
(Lebanon) 2017	Did not qualify			
(Indonesia) 2022	Did not enter			
(Saudi Arabia) 2025	Did not enter			
2029	Did not qualify			
Total	1/32	8	3	5

=== Asian Games ===
Basketball at the 1998 Asian Games – Men's tournament - 12th place

=== Novruz Cup ===
Year	Position	Tournament	Host
2012	2nd	2012 Novruz Cup	Baku, Azerbaijan
2013	2nd	2013 Novruz Cup	Tashkent, Uzbekistan
2014	3rd	2014 Novruz Cup	Bishkek, Kyrgyzstan

== Footnotes ==
*Was Assistant Coach but the Liga Forward had to make a quick decision to put him as an Interim Coach. He only took charge for 2 matches in which Kyrinakov lost both and therefore was fired. However, it is unknown who was coach after that and it is also unknown that they played any games.

== See also ==
- Kyrgyzstan women's national basketball team
- Kyrgyzstan national under-19 basketball team
- Kyrgyzstan national under-17 basketball team
- Kyrgyzstan national 3x3 team
