= 2012–13 Iranian Basketball Super League =

Locations of the 2011–12 season teams

The following is the results of the Iran Super League 2012/13 basketball season, Persian Gulf Cup.

== Regular season ==
=== Standings ===
Rank	Team	Pld	W	L	PF	PA	PD	Pts
1	Petrochimi Bandar Imam	18	17	1	1500	1269	+231	35
2	Foolad Mahan Isfahan	18	15	3	1377	1108	+269	33
3	Mahram Tehran	18	14	4	1445	1248	+197	31
4	Hamyari Shahrdari Zanjan	18	11	7	1221	1121	+100	29
5	Shahrdari Gorgan	18	8	10	1251	1339	−88	26
6	Azad University Tehran	18	7	11	1361	1374	−13	25
7	Sanaye Petrochimi Mahshahr	18	5	13	1231	1437	−206	23
8	Al-Badr Bandar Kong	18	5	13	1251	1404	−153	23
9	Esteghlal Zarin Qeshm	18	4	14	1253	1383	−130	22
10	Naft Sepahan Tehran	18	4	14	1315	1522	−207	22

=== Results ===
	BDR	AZD	EST	FLD	MAH	NAF	PET	SPM	GOR	ZAN
Al-Badr		91–85	66–59	55–71	69–80	93–86	68–78	65–70	65–64	51–48
Azad University	92–87		85–65	68–82	77–96	69–63	83–85	75–76	87–73	66–67
Esteghlal Zarin	84–80	56–62		65–74	71–77	87–91	63–82	69–57	57–59	63–69
Foolad Mahan	73–48	66–50	93–53		66–64	80–58	82–80	94–60	86–58	57–54
Mahram	100–66	91–68	95–84	78–75		92–65	84–87	85–71	98–68	86–80
Naft Sepahan	100–88	59–96	83–89	78–102	68–81		59–88	87–74	74–80	68–88
Petrochimi	92–70	82–69	89–71	74–70	81–71	91–69		94–72	80–68	92–75
Sanaye Petrochimi	73–69	69–83	76–74	62–88	60–81	85–86	59–78		54–64	61–60
Shahrdari Gorgan	65–59	93–85	78–81	49–66	72–86	69–58	67–75	81–69		80–73
Shahrdari Zanjan	84–61	73–61	67–62	54–52	20–0	70–63	69–72	94–73	76–53	

== Playoffs ==
Quarterfinals
1	Petrochimi	86	95	109
8	Al-Badr	61	97	57
4	Shahrdari Zanjan	73	74	—
5	Shahrdari Gorgan	74	77	—
2	Foolad Mahan	87	96	—
7	Sanaye Petrochimi	61	74	—
3	Mahram	76	80	—
6	Azad University	61	70	—

Semifinals
1	Petrochimi	96	107	92	—	—
5	Shahrdari Gorgan	68	53	50	—	—
2	Foolad Mahan	89	76	63	—	—
3	Mahram	96	84	73	—	—

Final
1	Petrochimi	102	96	89	83	88
3	Mahram	92	93	106	85	74
3rd place
5	Shahrdari Gorgan	68	47	—	X	X
2	Foolad Mahan	103	80	—	X	X

=== Quarterfinals ===
Petrochimi vs. Al-Badr

February 14
16:00

Report

Al-Badr	61–86	Petrochimi
Scoring by quarter: 19–21, 16–24, 19–18, 7–23
Pts: Soleimani 17; Rebs: Soleimani 5 Asts: Eslami, Paryab, Norouzi 2		Pts: Bečirovič 24; Rebs: Reihani 8 Asts: Bečirovič 11

Persian Gulf Arena, Kong
Referees: Reza Azarafza, Maziar Mirazimi, Nasr Saeidinia

February 18
16:00

Report

Petrochimi	95–97	Al-Badr
Scoring by quarter: 25–28, 28–9, 26–25, 16–35
Pts: Sohrabnejad 17; Rebs: Arghavan 9 Asts: Yakhchali 5		Pts: Eslami 20; Rebs: Dehghanian, Soleimani 5 Asts: Eslami 6

Besat Andisheh Arena, Mahshahr
Referees: Verej Abkarian, Behrouz Ebrahimi, Mohammad Javad Zare

February 21
16:00

Report

Petrochimi	109–57	Al-Badr
Scoring by quarter: 19–16, 26–11, 29–19, 35–11
Pts: Jaaber 30; Rebs: Arghavan 13; Asts: Jaaber 7		Pts: Eslami 13; Rebs: Yousefvand 6 Asts: Eslami 3

Besat Andisheh Arena, Mahshahr
Referees: Reza Javadi, Reza Azarafza, Alireza Nasser-Afshar

Shahrdari Zanjan vs. Shahrdari Gorgan

February 14
16:00

Report

Shahrdari Gorgan	74–73	Shahrdari Zanjan
Scoring by quarter: 13–7, 15–16, 16–24, 30–26
Pts: Baniaghil 21; Rebs: Abramian 13; Asts: Baniaghi, Bidrosian 3		Pts: Davoudi 18; Rebs: Fajardo 12; Asts: Fajardo 5

Imam Khomeini Hall, Gorgan
Referees: Verej Abkarian, Reza Javadi, Rasoul Davari

February 18
16:00

Report

Shahrdari Zanjan	74–77	Shahrdari Gorgan
Scoring by quarter: 27–20, 20–21, 18–16, 9–20
Pts: Fajardo 25; Rebs: Fajardo 8 Asts: Lepojević, Davarpanah, Baheran 3		Pts: Aliakseyeu 22; Rebs: Hadizadeh 9 Asts: Nezafat 3

Enghelab Arena, Zanjan
Referees: Amir Hossein Safarzadeh, Sadegh Ghanbari, Hassan Nikkhah

Foolad Mahan vs. Sanaye Petrochimi

February 14
16:00

Report

Sanaye Petrochimi	61–87	Foolad Mahan
Scoring by quarter: 15–28, 17–13, 12–26, 17–20
Pts: Shahsavand 17; Rebs: Čukinas 10; Asts: Prekevičius 3		Pts: Koné 18; Rebs: Williams, Koné 10; Asts: Davari, Williams 4

Besat Andisheh Arena, Mahshahr
Referees: Jafar Mohammadpour, Amir Vahedpour, Abdolreza Marhamati

February 18
16:00

Report

Foolad Mahan	96–74	Sanaye Petrochimi
Scoring by quarter: 24–16, 25–19, 24–16, 23–23
Pts: Williams 23; Rebs: Koné 13; Asts: Davari, Williams 5		Pts: Lalehzadeh 24; Rebs: Shahsavand 8 Asts: Prekevičius 4

Mokhaberat Arena, Isfahan
Referees: Mohammad Shahmirzadi, Mohammad Doust, Ali Norouzian

Mahram vs. Azad University

February 14
16:00

Report

Azad University	61–76	Mahram
Scoring by quarter: 15–19, 15–11, 16–24, 15–22
Pts: Hosseinzadeh, Nabipour 14; Rebs: Hosseinzadeh, Jamshidi 7 Asts: Koochoie 4		Pts: Nikkhah 24; Rebs: Milič 13; Asts: Nikkhah 6

Azadi Basketball Hall, Tehran
Referees: Amir Hossein Safarzadeh, Mohammad Shahmirzadi, Mahmoud Oliazadeh

February 18
15:30

Report

Mahram	80–70	Azad University
Scoring by quarter: 25–18, 18–12, 20–18, 17–22
Pts: Milič 22; Rebs: Milič 11; Asts: Kamrani 6		Pts: Jamshidi 18; Rebs: Foroutan 9 Asts: Jamshidi 4

Azadi Basketball Hall, Tehran
Referees: Reza Javadi, Akbar Momeni, Mohammad Reza Salehian

=== Semifinals ===
Petrochimi vs. Shahrdari Gorgan

February 25
16:00

Report

Petrochimi	96–68	Shahrdari Gorgan
Scoring by quarter: 34–15, 14–17, 25–23, 23–13
Pts: Afagh 35; Rebs: Jaaber, Sohrabnejad, Arghavan 7 Asts: Jaaber 7		Pts: Aliakseyeu 13; Rebs: Aliakseyeu 6 Asts: Bidrosian, Hadizadeh 2

Besat Andisheh Arena, Mahshahr
Referees: Reza Javadi, Reza Azarafza, Verej Abkarian

February 26
16:00

Report

Petrochimi	107–53	Shahrdari Gorgan
Scoring by quarter: 22–7, 19–19, 36–8, 30–19
Pts: Jaaber 24; Rebs: Arghavan 12; Asts: Afagh 7		Pts: Abramian 20; Rebs: five players 3 Asts: Dehghan 2

Besat Andisheh Arena, Mahshahr
Referees: Verej Abkarian, Rasoul Davari, Alireza Nasser-Afshar

March 1
16:00

Report

Shahrdari Gorgan	50–92	Petrochimi
Scoring by quarter: 15–18, 6–33, 14–18, 15–23
Pts: Abramian 19; Rebs: Abramian 7 Asts: Nezafat, Bidrosian 3		Pts: Jaaber 28; Rebs: Sohrabnejad 8 Asts: Jaaber 6

Imam Khomeini Hall, Gorgan
Referees: Verej Abkarian, Reza Azarafza, Mohammad Shahmirzadi

Foolad Mahan vs. Mahram

February 25
15:40

Report

Mahram	96–89	Foolad Mahan
Scoring by quarter: 22–18, 29–24, 18–17, 27–30
Pts: Nikkhah 38; Rebs: Elson, Nikkhah 8 Asts: Kamrani 6		Pts: Williams 20; Rebs: Williams, Koné 6 Asts: Veisi 5

Azadi Basketball Hall, Tehran
Referees: Hassan Nikkhah, Jafar Mohammadpour, Mohammad Shahmirzadi

February 26
16:00

Report

Mahram	84–76	Foolad Mahan
Scoring by quarter: 17–21, 10–23, 27–18, 30–14
Pts: Nikkhah 28; Rebs: Milič 10; Asts: Milič, Nikkhah 2		Pts: Veisi 16; Rebs: Williams 11; Asts: Akbari, Veisi 3

Azadi Basketball Hall, Tehran
Referees: Hassan Nikkhah, Ramin Hosseinzadeh, Sadegh Ghanbari

March 1
16:00

Report

Foolad Mahan	63–73	Mahram
Scoring by quarter: 17–20, 17–15, 10–19, 19–19
Pts: Williams 24; Rebs: Koné 15; Asts: Veisi 4		Pts: Nikkhah 20; Rebs: Milič 8 Asts: Kamrani 6

Mokhaberat Arena, Isfahan
Referees: Amir Hossein Safarzadeh, Jafar Mohammadpour, Mahmoud Oliazadeh

=== 3rd place ===
Shahrdari Gorgan vs. Foolad Mahan

March 7
16:00

Report

Foolad Mahan	103–68	Shahrdari Gorgan
Scoring by quarter: 19–21, 28–14, 27–15, 29–18
Pts: Veisi 19; Rebs: Sahakian 10; Asts: Williams 7		Pts: Bidrosian 18; Rebs: Hadizadeh 9 Asts: Nezafat 4

Mokhaberat Arena, Isfahan
Referees: Ramin Hosseinzadeh, Amir Vahedpour, Mohsen Roshanzamir

March 11
16:00

Report

Shahrdari Gorgan	47–80	Foolad Mahan
Scoring by quarter: 9–15, 13–25, 8–24, 17–16
Pts: Baniaghil 16; Rebs: Aliakseyeu 9 Asts: Aliakseyeu 2		Pts: Sahakian, Kardoust 17; Rebs: Sahakian 16; Asts: Williams 3

Imam Khomeini Hall, Gorgan
Referees: Amir Vahedpour, Mohammad Doust, Sadegh Ghanbari

=== Final ===
Petrochimi vs. Mahram

March 9
16:00

Report

Petrochimi	102–92	Mahram
Scoring by quarter: 30–8, 29–27, 24–24, 19–33
Pts: Afagh 32; Rebs: Arghavan 9 Asts: Bečirovič 6		Pts: Nikkhah 27; Rebs: Milič 8 Asts: Nikkhah 4

Besat Andisheh Arena, Mahshahr
Referees: Amir Hossein Safarzadeh, Jafar Mohammadpour, Mahmoud Oliazadeh

March 10
16:00

Report

Petrochimi	96–93	Mahram
Scoring by quarter: 23–28, 28–20, 20–16, 25–29
Pts: Jaaber 35; Rebs: Arghavan 11; Asts: Jaaber 9		Pts: Nikkhah 30; Rebs: Milič 11; Asts: Kamrani 3

Besat Andisheh Arena, Mahshahr
Referees: Amir Hossein Safarzadeh, Jafar Mohammadpour, Mahmoud Oliazadeh

March 13
15:30

Report

Mahram	106–89	Petrochimi
Scoring by quarter: 21–21, 22–24, 27–22, 36–22
Pts: Nikkhah 30; Rebs: Milič 13; Asts: Kamrani 4		Pts: Jaaber 22; Rebs: Sohrabnejad 10; Asts: Bečirovič 6

Azadi Basketball Hall, Tehran
Referees: Amir Hossein Safarzadeh, Reza Azarafza, Sadegh Ghanbari

March 14
15:30

Report

Mahram	85–83	Petrochimi
Scoring by quarter: 13–26, 25–9, 23–24, 24–24
Pts: Nikkhah 22; Rebs: Milič 10; Asts: Kamrani 4		Pts: Arghavan 26; Rebs: Arghavan 12; Asts: Afagh 4

Azadi Basketball Hall, Tehran
Referees: Amir Hossein Safarzadeh, Jafar Mohammadpour, Reza Azarafza

March 16
15:30

Report

Mahram	74–88	Petrochimi
Scoring by quarter: 19–22, 13–19, 14–26, 28–21
Pts: Nikkhah 27; Rebs: Milič 19; Asts: Milič 3		Pts: Afagh, Sohrabnejad 20; Rebs: Sohrabnejad 12; Asts: Bečirovič, Sohrabnejad 4

Azadi Basketball Hall, Tehran
Referees: Amir Hossein Safarzadeh, Reza Azarafza, Jafar Mohammadpour
