= 2013–14 Iranian Basketball Super League =

Iranian basketball league season

Locations of the 2013–14 season teams

The 2013–14 Iran Super League season was the 24th season of the Iranian basketball league.

== Regular season ==
=== Standings ===
Pos	Team	Pld	W	L	PF	PA	PD	Pts	Qualification
1	Petrochimi Bandar Imam	22	22	0	1957	1410	+547	44	Qualification to second round
2	Mahram Tehran	22	19	3	1678	1398	+280	41	Qualification to second round
3	Azad University Tehran	22	17	5	1652	1510	+142	39	Qualification to second round
4	Zob Ahan Isfahan	22	15	7	1529	1400	+129	37	Qualification to second round
5	Foolad Mahan Isfahan	22	12	10	1469	1413	+56	34	Qualification to second round
6	Sanaye Petrochimi Mahshahr	22	10	12	1465	1513	−48	32	Qualification to second round
7	Foolad Haft Almas Qazvin	22	9	13	1497	1571	−74	31	Qualification to second round
8	Hamyari Shahrdari Zanjan	22	8	14	1433	1524	−91	30	Qualification to second round
9	Esteghlal Zarin Qeshm	22	7	15	1468	1556	−88	29	
10	Afra Khalij Fars Tehran	22	6	16	1449	1620	−171	28	
11	Shahrdari Gorgan	22	5	17	1346	1600	−254	27	
12	Niroo Zamini Tehran	22	2	20	1310	1738	−428	24	

Source: IRIBF

=== Results ===
Home \ Away	AFR	AZD	EST	FHA	FMS	HAM	MAH	NIR	PET	SPM	SHG	ZOB
Afra Khalij Fars Tehran	—	73–77	66–55	71–75	60–71	86–74	57–73	93–66	56–98	84–76	71–73	50–63
Azad University Tehran	71–64	—	80–84	102–93	62–40	75–69	65–80	62–37	61–79	75–64	60–49	85–73
Esteghlal Zarin Qeshm	86–69	69–77	—	81–77	58–56	57–60	72–79	87–60	75–83	66–77	70–54	65–69
Foolad Haft Almas Qazvin	77–60	57–72	79–83	—	67–57	63–60	58–71	88–63	48–75	69–78	61–53	76–60
Foolad Mahan Isfahan	84–66	98–95	52–38	72–53	—	74–57	65–69	81–61	67–71	64–61	81–55	43–50
Hamyari Shahrdari Zanjan	69–43	62–67	71–65	67–56	63–68	—	59–66	71–50	54–77	53–46	67–57	54–70
Mahram Tehran	83–55	69–73	75–52	69–58	83–66	92–60	—	85–45	61–78	61–60	95–78	90–67
Niroo Zamini Tehran	62–70	82–85	74–72	69–76	56–69	72–77	58–81	—	59–88	51–74	71–69	49–74
Petrochimi Bandar Imam	90–58	89–85	101–52	104–83	85–66	108–75	80–68	105–67	—	95–64	111–54	87–60
Sanaye Petrochimi Mahshahr	69–67	53–67	52–50	69–55	68–73	74–68	58–80	96–57	59–102	—	76–63	57–78
Shahrdari Gorgan	45–65	57–80	82–76	58–67	66–62	77–70	63–69	65–57	75–78	60–69	—	50–77
Zob Ahan Isfahan	83–65	69–76	63–55	77–61	69–60	81–73	71–79	70–44	63–73	75–65	67–43	—

Source: IRIBF
Legend: Blue = home team win; Red = away team win.
Matches with lighter background shading were decided after overtime.

== Relegation round ==
Semifinals
9	Esteghlal Zarin Qeshm	2
12	Niroo Zamini Tehran	0
10	Afra Khalij Fars Tehran	0
11	Shahrdari Gorgan	2

Ninth place
9	Esteghlal Zarin Qeshm	63
11	Shahrdari Gorgan	81
Eleventh place
12	Niroo Zamini Tehran	59
10	Afra Khalij Fars Tehran	71

Team 1	Series	Team 2	Game 1	Game 2	Game 3
Esteghlal Zarin Qeshm	2–0	Niroo Zamini Tehran	91–66	56–49	
Afra Khalij Fars Tehran	0–2	Shahrdari Gorgan	77–84	62–71	

== Second round ==
=== Group A ===
Pos	Team	Pld	W	L	PF	PA	PD	Pts	Qualification
1	Petrochimi Bandar Imam	6	6	0	519	402	+117	12	Qualification to playoffs
2	Azad University Tehran	6	2	4	408	399	+9	8	Qualification to playoffs
3	Foolad Mahan Isfahan	6	2	4	385	456	−71	8	Qualification to playoffs
4	Foolad Haft Almas Qazvin	6	2	4	423	478	−55	8	Qualification to playoffs

Source: IRIBF

Home \ Away	AZD	FHA	FMS	PET
Azad University Tehran	—	77–42	69–74	62–82
Foolad Haft Almas Qazvin	65–62	—	55–60	112–116
Foolad Mahan Isfahan	76–83	68–83	—	55–60
Petrochimi Bandar Imam	60–55	95–66	106–52	—

Source: IRIBF
Legend: Blue = home team win; Red = away team win.
Matches with lighter background shading were decided after overtime.

=== Group B ===
Pos	Team	Pld	W	L	PF	PA	PD	Pts	Qualification
1	Mahram Tehran	6	6	0	454	361	+93	12	Qualification to playoffs
2	Zob Ahan Isfahan	6	4	2	402	385	+17	10	Qualification to playoffs
3	Hamyari Shahrdari Zanjan	6	1	5	392	433	−41	7	Qualification to playoffs
4	Sanaye Petrochimi Mahshahr	6	1	5	384	453	−69	7	Qualification to playoffs

Source: IRIBF

Home \ Away	HAM	MAH	SPM	ZOB
Hamyari Shahrdari Zanjan	—	59–80	52–57	50–57
Mahram Tehran	81–72	—	91–63	66–55
Sanaye Petrochimi Mahshahr	81–89	54–66	—	78–84
Zob Ahan Isfahan	77–70	58–70	71–51	—

Source: IRIBF
Legend: Blue = home team win; Red = away team win.
Matches with lighter background shading were decided after overtime.

== Playoffs ==
Quarterfinals
A1	Petrochimi Bandar Imam	2
B4	Sanaye Petrochimi Mahshahr	0
B2	Zob Ahan Isfahan	2
A3	Foolad Mahan Isfahan	1
B1	Mahram Tehran	2
A4	Foolad Haft Almas Qazvin	0
A2	Azad University Tehran	2
B3	Hamyari Shahrdari Zanjan	0

Semifinals
A1	Petrochimi Bandar Imam	3
B2	Zob Ahan Isfahan	0
B1	Mahram Tehran	3
A2	Azad University Tehran	0

Final
A1	Petrochimi Bandar Imam	4
B1	Mahram Tehran	1
Third place
B2	Zob Ahan Isfahan	0
A2	Azad University Tehran	2

=== Quarterfinals ===
The higher-seeded team played the first and third leg (if necessary) at home.

Team 1	Series	Team 2	Game 1	Game 2	Game 3
Petrochimi Bandar Imam	2–0	Sanaye Petrochimi Mahshahr	91–59	104–65	
Zob Ahan Isfahan	2–1	Foolad Mahan Isfahan	63–66	65–63	78–57
Mahram Tehran	2–0	Foolad Haft Almas Qazvin	83–66	73–46	
Azad University Tehran	2–0	Hamyari Shahrdari Zanjan	20–0	20–0	

=== Semifinals ===
The higher-seeded team played the first, second and fifth leg (if necessary) at home.

Team 1	Series	Team 2	Game 1	Game 2	Game 3	Game 4	Game 5
Petrochimi Bandar Imam	3–0	Zob Ahan Isfahan	80–72	79–74	72–67		
Mahram Tehran	3–0	Azad University Tehran	85–67	78–75	80–65		

=== Third place ===
The higher-seeded team played the first and third leg (if necessary) at home.

Team 1	Series	Team 2	Game 1	Game 2	Game 3
Azad University Tehran	2–0	Zob Ahan Isfahan	76–72	78–59	

=== Final ===
The higher-seeded team played the first, second, fifth and seventh leg (if necessary) at home.

Team 1	Series	Team 2	Game 1	Game 2	Game 3	Game 4	Game 5	Game 6	Game 7
Petrochimi Bandar Imam	4–1	Mahram Tehran	78–62	68–66	78–85	78–77	110–106		
