= Mickey Bergman =

American academic

- Born: Tel Aviv, Israel
- Education: University of California, Los Angeles (B.A.); Georgetown University, Walsh School of Foreign Service (MSFS)
- Occupations: CEO of Global Reach; Vice President and Executive Director of the Richardson Center for Global Engagement; Adjunct Professor at Walsh School of Foreign Service
- Awards: American Hostage Freedom Award (2023)

Michael "Mickey" Bergman is the CEO of Global Reach and the Vice President and executive director of the Richardson Center for Global Engagement. He also serves as an adjunct professor at Georgetown University's Walsh School of Foreign Service, where his graduate level courses focus on the art of emotional intelligence in international relations and negotiations. Previously, he served as executive director of the Global Alliances Program at the Aspen Institute and founded the Solel Strategic Group (SSG).

Bergman has advocated for numerous political prisoners and hostages, including Paul Whelan, Brittney Griner, Trevor Reed, and Taylor Dudley from Russia; Danny Fenster from Myanmar; Otto Warmbier and Kenneth Bae from North Korea; Xiyue Wang, Michael R. White (U.S. veteran), and Robert Levinson from Iran; and the Citgo Six, Eyvin Hernandez, Savoi Wright from Venezuela and Elizabeth Tsurkov from Iraq.

For his efforts alongside Bill Richardson, Bergman was nominated for the Nobel Peace Prize in 2019 and again in 2023. In 2023, Bergman received the James W. Foley Legacy Foundation American Hostage Freedom Award from the Foley Foundation.

Pioneering the field of Fringe Diplomacy, Bergman has developed a unique approach to global engagement that connects individuals in areas typically overlooked by governments and NGOs. He aims to create new political capital by leading professional exchange programs to frontier countries such as North Korea, Myanmar, Cuba, Lebanon, and others.

Bergman is also an author and commentator. He wrote In the Shadows: True Stories of High-Stakes Negotiations to Free Americans Captured Abroad and has published numerous articles and opinion pieces. He frequently provides media commentary on cases of Americans held hostage, hostage diplomacy, and international relations, and is recognized as an expert in the fields of Cuba, North Korea, and Myanmar.

== Early life and career ==
Bergman was born and raised in Tel Aviv. He is a former paratrooper in the Israel Defense Forces. Bergman graduated from the University of California, Los Angeles with a bachelor's degree. He went on study at the Edmund A. Walsh School of Foreign Service at Georgetown University where he obtained a Master of Science in Foreign Service.

Prior to his work with the Aspen Institute and Solel Strategic Group (SSG), Bergman served for two years as the Director of Congressional Relations and Senior Policy Analyst at the Center for Middle East Peace & Economic Cooperation. As president of SSG, the group worked with the Clinton Global Initiative, former Governor Bill Richardson, the Robert Redford Center at Sundance, and the Elders. At the Aspen Institute, Bergman previously directed programs including Partners for a New Beginning, the Emirates-Aspen Partnership, the North-Africa Partnership of Economic Opportunity, and the U.S.-Lebanon Dialogue.

== Hostage and prisoner advocacy ==
Bill Richardson first became aware of Bergman through his humanitarian work in Sudan, which subsequently led to a diplomatic mission to Khartoum. Bergman later took on a leadership role at the Richardson Center for Global Engagement, serving as vice president and executive director. In this capacity, Bergman has collaborated closely with diplomat Cameron R. Hume through the Richardson Center's initiatives.

=== Israel ===
In 2007, Bergman and Richardson began back channel negotiations to secure the release of Gilad Shalit, an Israel Defense Forces who had been captured by Hamas a year earlier. They planned a trip to Israel and Egypt. In Israel, they met with Shimon Peres, Tzipi Livni, Ami Ayalon, and Galit's father. In Egypt, they met with Egyptian President Hosni Mubarak and Omar Suleiman (politician). Richardson and his team were acknowledged for their role in securing Shalit's release through a prisoner exchange.

=== North Korea ===
==== Kenneth Bae ====
In January 2013, Bergman, Richardson, and then-Google Executive Chairman Eric Schmidt traveled to Pyongyang, North Korea on a private diplomatic mission. Their efforts included seeking release of Kenneth Bae, an imprisoned American Christian missionary, charged with crimes related to preaching against the North Korean government. The group delivered a letter to government officials for delivery to Bae. Following the visit, Richardson and Bergman published an opinion piece in The Washington Post, advocating for a reset in relations with North Korea. Bae was ultimately released in November 2014.

==== Otto F. Warmbier ====
In September 2016, a delegation organized by the Richardson Center visited North Korea in a humanitarian mission supported by the Obama administration. The delegation included Bergman, Rick Downes, and P. Willey, and at the time was the first such face-to-face contact in nearly two years. They discussed resuming the recovery of American soldiers' remains, aid for flood victims, and the release of Otto F. Warmbier, a University of Virginia student imprisoned in North Korea.

Bergman played an ongoing role in the efforts to free Warmbier, working closely with Richardson and the Warmbier family. His strategy involved engaging directly with North Korean officials, utilizing personal relationships, and leveraging humanitarian gestures to support the negotiations for Warmbier's release. Despite these efforts, Warmbier returned to the U.S. in a coma and died shortly thereafter after 17 months of imprisonment.

=== Iran ===
Bergman and Richardson played roles in securing the release of Princeton graduate student Xiyue Wang from Iran in 2019. Wang had been detained in Iran for over three years. Acting on behalf of the Wang family and engaging with Iranian officials for months, the Richardson Center facilitated discussions that led to Wang's eventual release in a prisoner swap with Iranian scientist Masoud Soleimani in December 2019.

Following the Wang-Soleimani exchange, they met with Iranian Foreign Minister Mohammad Javad Zarif in Doha, Qatar to discuss the detentions of Michael R. White (U.S. veteran) and Robert Levinson. The Richardson Center was advocating for the release of both individuals on behalf of their families. Subsequently, Michael White was released in exchange for the United States allowing an Iranian-American physician to visit Iran. Levinson was declared to be presumed dead in 2020.

=== Myanmar ===
In late 2021, Bergman and Richardson traveled to Naypyitaw, Myanmar, ostensibly to discuss humanitarian aid and COVID-19, despite U.S. officials' caution against mentioning American journalist Danny Fenster, detained there. They facilitated behind-the-scenes negotiations, met Myanmar's military leader Min Aung Hlaing and raised Fenster's case. They eventually secured Fenster's release, along with another activist, after months of detention.

=== Russia ===
==== Arrest of Trevor Reed ====
Bergman was involved in negotiating for the release of Trevor Reed with Russian officials. In early 2022, just before Russia's invasion of Ukraine, Bergman and Richardson visited Russia to negotiate a potential prisoner swap involving Reed and Paul Whelan. Reed was ultimately released in a one-for-one prisoner swap for Konstantin Yaroshenko.

==== Brittney Griner ====
They played a role in the efforts to secure Brittney Griner's release. Bergman worked behind the scenes with Griner's family and legal team. This included a trip to a country neighboring Russia for an 11-hour meeting aimed at preserving negotiation channels and understanding the Russian stance better. Although the White House did not officially recognize freelance diplomats as part of the negotiations, Bergman and Richardson engaged in back-channel communications with Russian officials. They provided information and insights to the National Security Council and Griner's family, which contributed to the one-for-one swap for Russian arms dealer Viktor Bout. Following her release, she issued a statement expressing her gratitude: "We would like to extend a special thank you to Governor Richardson and Mickey Bergman of the Richardson Center for their dedicated efforts and for maintaining constant communication with us."

==== Taylor Dudley ====
His team at the Richardson Center played a role in securing the release of Taylor Dudley, who had been detained in 2022 in Russia. They traveled to Moscow and Kaliningrad multiple times to liaise with Russian counterparts and conduits. Despite tensions with some U.S. administration officials, they leveraged Richardson's extensive network, including influential contacts like Sergey Lavrov and Ara Abramyan, who had previously assisted in other detainee cases. Their efforts culminated in Dudley's release via the Poland-Russia border in January 2023.

==== Paul Whelan ====
He had for the release of Paul Whelan, including multiple negotiation attempts and proposals without success. Whelan has been imprisoned in Russia since December 2018. Whelan was subsequently released in a prisoner exchange.

=== Iraq ===
Bergman advocated for Elizabeth Tsurkov, a Russian-Israeli researcher who was kidnapped in Baghdad in March 2023 and was held by the group Kata'ib Hezbollah. In November 2023, the group released a propaganda video using Tsurkov. Bergman viewed the video as a positive development, stating, "Any time a proof of life video is shared, it presents an opportunity to initiate a dialogue." Tsurkov was released by the group on 9 September 2025.

=== Venezuela ===
Bergman has been an advocate for the release of several Americans detained in Venezuela. In 2020, Richardson made a trip to Venezuela to personally appeal to President Nicolás Maduro for the release of American detainees. One release came in March 2022, when Gustavo Cárdenas of the Citgo Six was released, a result attributed in part to the efforts of Richardson and Bergman. Bergman and Richardson continued in their efforts to secure the release of other Americans detained in Venezuela, successfully achieving the release of the remainder of the Citgo Six in October 2022. They continued their advocacy, contributing to a broader exchange that led to the release of ten Americans, including Savoi Wright and Eyvin Hernandez, in December 2023.

== Writings and commentary ==
Bergman has published numerous articles, interviews, and opinion pieces on hostage negotiations and international diplomacy. He is regularly quoted as a subject matter expert in these areas and frequently appears in television interviews. In 2024 Bergman wrote In the Shadows: True Stories of High-Stakes Negotiations to Free Americans Captured Abroad with Ellis Henican. The memoir details Bergman's role in hostage negotiations.

=== North Korea ===
Bergman has been interviewed numerous times on the topic of negotiations with North Korea. In March 2018, before the 2018 North Korea–United States Singapore Summit, Bergman and Richardson published an opinion piece in the Washington Post. They argued that President Trump should meet with Kim Jong Un despite the improbability of North Korea abandoning its nuclear weapons because the meeting could pave the way for a valuable diplomatic breakthrough. They further argued that this encounter would support South Korean efforts, potentially secure the release of American prisoners, and revive efforts to recover the remains of U.S. soldiers. They posited that Trump must approach the negotiation with patience, a clear strategy, and avoid inflammatory rhetoric, as North Korea's negotiators are experienced and cautious. They believed that, while complete denuclearization is unlikely, a deal involving halting nuclear programs, easing sanctions, and a formal end to the Korean War could be achievable, which is crucial for reducing the risk of military conflict.

=== Myanmar ===
In their 2012 The New York Times article, Richardson and Bergman discussed Myanmar's cautious transition towards democracy and economic reform. They emphasized challenges such as poverty, governance capacity building, and ethnic reconciliation, urging international engagement, especially from the United States, to support Myanmar effectively and prevent losing influence to China. Myanmar experienced a coup in 2021.

In 2019, Bergman was interviewed on the plight of the Rohingya people.

=== Israel-Palestine Conflict ===
In 2010, Bergman and Amjad Atallah published opinion piece that discussed the ongoing Israeli-Palestinian conflict and proposed a shift from creating two ethnic states to two multi-ethnic states to better address core issues like borders, refugees, and settlers. They argued that status quo approaches, influenced by national narratives and demographic concerns, fail to create sustainable peace. They suggest a Permanent Residency Status allowing individuals to live and work in one state while holding citizenship and political rights in another. This solution aims to maintain national identities, address humanitarian concerns, and integrate the rights of Jewish settlers, Palestinian refugees, and Israeli Arabs, thereby fostering coexistence and reducing zero-sum dynamics.

During the Gaza war, Bergman has been interviewed as an expert in ceasefire and hostage negotiations. In May 2024, he gave an interview with NPR where he discussed Israel's transactional approach versus Hamas' focus on achieving a specific outcome in negotiations. He noted the core issues: Israel seeks hostages for a temporary cease-fire, while Hamas insists on a permanent end to hostilities. Bergman highlighted time pressure, worsening conditions, and external mediation (U.S., Egypt, Qatar) as factors influencing potential progress. He suggested these dynamics, coupled with imminent military actions and public awareness of hostage situations, might spur both sides to reach a resolution.

=== Venezuela ===
In a 2024, Vanity Fair (magazine) article, he provided context regarding Venezuela's internal dynamics and hostage-taking. He discussed Alex Saab's portrayal as a freedom fighter within Venezuela under Nicolás Maduro. Bergman noted Saab's extradition in October 2021 by the United States Department of Justice, followed on the same day by Citgo employees being sent back to prison from house arrest. Subsequently, he notes the arrests of Osman Khan and Eyvin Hernandez in the months that followed. He argues that these actions, viewed through Venezuela's narrative of Saab as a political prisoner wrongly detained in the United States, exacerbated tensions and prompted retaliatory measures from the Maduro government.

=== Hostages and prisoners ===
==== Family campaigns ====
Bergman has supported the Bring Our Families Home campaign. In 2022, Bergman explained to NPR that families of Americans wrongfully detained abroad are shifting from staying quiet to being more vocal. He explained further that silence was believed to help diplomatic efforts, but recent successes like Trevor Reed's release through public advocacy have changed this approach. He noticed that families now realize that staying quiet often protects captors and reduces government urgency. He believes that captors seek political leverage, not influence from family statements, so public campaigns should target the U.S. administration.

==== Prisoner exchanges ====
Bergman is one of the experts advocating for a reevaluation of the U.S. "no concessions" policy in negotiations for American hostages, a strategy originally intended to discourage kidnappings.

In response to the argument that prisoner exchanges create a false equivalence between innocent American hostages and convicted felons, and that such swaps incentivize hostage-taking, Bergman told the Associated Press: "The framing is wrong. Because it’s not about the guilty people that get released, it’s about the innocent Americans that come back home. And so I reverse the question and say: Is leaving ... innocent Americans to rot in prisons around the world worth the insistence of us having criminals, foreign criminals, serve their full time in the American system?”

== Works ==
- Bergman, Mickey (2024-06-04). In the Shadows. New York: Center Street. ISBN 978-1-5460-0475-2.
