= 2016 FIBA Asia Champions Cup =

25th Asia Champions Cup

Tournament details
- Host country: China
- Dates: 8–16 October
- Teams: 10 (from 45 federations)
- Venue: 1 (in 1 host city)

Final positions
- Champions: China (China Kashgar's 1st title; China's 4th title)

Tournament statistics
- Games played: 32
- MVP: (United States) Dewarick Spencer
- Top scorer: (United States) Young (35.0)
- Top rebounds: (United Arab Emirates) Alshabebi (12.7)
- Top assists: (United States) Adams (5.6)
- PPG (Team): China Kashgar (100.9)
- RPG (Team): (Iran) Petrochimi (49.3)
- APG (Team): China Kashgar (19.3)

Official website
- 2016 FIBA Asia Champions Cup

The 2016 FIBA Asia Champions Cup was the 25th staging of the FIBA Asia Champions Cup, the international basketball club tournament of FIBA Asia. The tournament took place in Chenzhou, China from 8 October to 16 October, 2016. The venue of the tournament was Chenzhou Olympic Sports Centre Gymnasium. This was the return of the tournament after a two-year hiatus since the 2013 edition.

Xinjiang Flying Tigers from China, which used the name 'China Kashgar' during this tournament, won its first ever FIBA Asia Champions Cup title in its tournament debut. After going undefeated in the entire tournament, Xinjiang defeated Al-Riyadi from Lebanon in the final game, 96–88. It was the fourth time a club from China has won the championship.

== Qualification ==
According to the FIBA Asia rules, the number of participating teams in the FIBA Asia Champions Cup is ten. Each of the six FIBA Asia Sub-Zones has one place, and the hosts (China) was automatically qualified. The other three places are allocated to the zones according to performance in the 2013 FIBA Asia Champions Cup.

Central Asia (1)	East Asia (1+1+1)	Gulf (1+1)	South Asia (1)	Southeast Asia (1)	West Asia (1+1)
(Kazakhstan) Barsy Atyrau	China Kashgar	(United Arab Emirates) Al-Ahli	(India) ONGC	Malaysia Dragons	(Iran) Petrochimi
	(Chinese Taipei) Pauian	(Qatar) Al-Rayyan			(Lebanon) Al-Riyadi
	~~TBD~~ *				(Iraq) Al-Shorta *

* The third place of East Asia subzone is reallocated to West Asia subzone.

According to the Basketball Federation of India's official website, the 30th Federation National Basketball Championship served as the qualifying tournament for the FIBA Asia Champions Cup, wherein the champion team will qualify to represent South Asia. On March 14, 2016, ONGC defeated IOB in the finals to win the championship and the right to represent South Asia subzone to the FIBA Asia Champions Cup.

On March 27, 2016, the Westports Malaysia Dragons clinched a berth to the 2016 FIBA Asia Champions Cup by winning the ASEAN Basketball League crown against rivals Singapore Slingers in a best of 5 Finals series.

== Preliminary round ==
The draw was held in the host city Chenzhou on 1 September 2016.

All times are local (UTC+8).

=== Group A ===
Pos	Team	Pld	W	L	PF	PA	PD	Pts	Qualification
1	(Lebanon) Al-Riyadi	4	4	0	362	287	+75	8	Quarterfinals
2	(Iran) Petrochimi	4	3	1	347	251	+96	7	Quarterfinals
3	(Chinese Taipei) Pauian	4	2	2	351	341	+10	6	Quarterfinals
4	(Qatar) Al-Rayyan	4	1	3	284	323	−39	5	Quarterfinals
5	(India) ONGC	4	0	4	240	382	−142	4	

Source: FIBA Asia

8 October 2016
15:00

Boxscore

Petrochimi (Iran)	100–80	(Chinese Taipei) Pauian
Scoring by quarter: 27–21, 24–24, 27–18, 22–17
Pts: Robinson, White 28; Rebs: Sahakian 10; Asts: three players 4		Pts: Davis 22; Rebs: Davis 8 Asts: Wu C. 4

Chenzhou Olympic Sports Centre Gymnasium, Chenzhou
Referees: Ahmed Al Bulushi (OMA), Ahmed Ali Yaseen Al-Suwaili (IRQ), Yang Xiaoguang (CHN)

8 October 2016
18:00

Boxscore

Al-Rayyan (Qatar)	78–92	(Lebanon) Al-Riyadi
Scoring by quarter: 25–26, 8–24, 19–27, 26–15
Pts: Knowles 28; Rebs: Knowles 9 Asts: Knowles 8		Pts: Spencer 23; Rebs: El Khatib 9 Asts: Arakji 4

Chenzhou Olympic Sports Centre Gymnasium, Chenzhou
Referees: Ferdinand Pascual (PHI), Chan Owe Shiong (MAS), Wang Mei (CHN)

9 October 2016
13:00

Boxscore

ONGC (India)	51–95	(Iran) Petrochimi
Scoring by quarter: 11–25, 15–30, 19–21, 6–19
Pts: Bhriguvanshi 14; Rebs: Y. Singh 7 Asts: Bhriguvanshi 2		Pts: Atashi, Robinson 14; Rebs: White 8 Asts: Robinson 7

Chenzhou Olympic Sports Centre Gymnasium, Chenzhou
Referees: Ahmed Ali Yaseen Al-Suwaili (IRQ), Chan Owe Shiong (MAS), Yang Xiaoguang (CHN)

9 October 2016
18:00

Boxscore

Pauian (Chinese Taipei)	89–65	(Qatar) Al-Rayyan
Scoring by quarter: 23–12, 21–20, 28–20, 17–13
Pts: Davis 22; Rebs: Davis 10; Asts: Creighton 4		Pts: Knowles 27; Rebs: Abdelhaleem 7 Asts: Abdelkawy 3

Chenzhou Olympic Sports Centre Gymnasium, Chenzhou
Referees: Ferdinand Pascual (PHI), Ahmed Al Bulushi (OMA), Wang Mei (CHN)

10 October 2016
13:00

Boxscore

Al-Rayyan (Qatar)	95–53	(India) ONGC
Scoring by quarter: 21–14, 19–9, 26–16, 29–14
Pts: Knowles 39; Rebs: Knowles 14; Asts: Knowles 5		Pts: Bhriguvanshi 20; Rebs: Bhriguvanshi, Ravindran 8 Asts: Bhandari, Bhriguvanshi 2

Chenzhou Olympic Sports Centre Gymnasium, Chenzhou
Referees: Wang Mei (CHN), Chan Owe Shiong (MAS), Yang Xiaoguang (CHN)

10 October 2016
18:00

Boxscore

Al-Riyadi (Lebanon)	105–81	(Chinese Taipei) Pauian
Scoring by quarter: 26–17, 28–21, 24–26, 27–17
Pts: Spencer 31; Rebs: Haidar 7 Asts: Arakji, Spencer 3		Pts: Davis 21; Rebs: Davis 11; Asts: Davis, Wu C. 3

Chenzhou Olympic Sports Centre Gymnasium, Chenzhou
Referees: Ferdinand Pascual (PHI), Ahmed Al Bulushi (OMA), Ahmed Ali Yaseen Al-Suwaili (IRQ)

11 October 2016
13:00

Boxscore

Petrochimi (Iran)	89–46	(Qatar) Al-Rayyan
Scoring by quarter: 25–8, 19–17, 27–10, 18–11
Pts: Robinson 17; Rebs: Sahakian 11; Asts: Hosseinzadeh, Robinson 4		Pts: Mohamed 16; Rebs: Abdelhaleem 9 Asts: Knowles, Mohamed 2

Chenzhou Olympic Sports Centre Gymnasium, Chenzhou
Referees: Ferdinand Pascual (PHI), Chan Owe Shiong (MAS), Yang Xiaoguang (CHN)

11 October 2016
18:00

Boxscore

ONGC (India)	65–91	(Lebanon) Al-Riyadi
Scoring by quarter: 22–29, 14–20, 8–16, 21–26
Pts: Am. Singh 21; Rebs: Am. Singh 11; Asts: Bhriguvanshi, Am. Singh 2		Pts: Arakji 21; Rebs: Abdelnour 11; Asts: Arakji 6

Chenzhou Olympic Sports Centre Gymnasium, Chenzhou
Referees: Ahmed Al Bulushi (OMA), Ahmed Ali Yaseen Al-Suwaili (IRQ), Wang Mei (CHN)

12 October 2016
15:00

Boxscore

Pauian (Chinese Taipei)	101–71	(India) ONGC
Scoring by quarter: 24–21, 25–23, 24–18, 28–9
Pts: Lin C. 19; Rebs: Davis 8 Asts: Lee 8		Pts: Am. Singh 19; Rebs: Am. Singh 13; Asts: Bhriguvanshi 6

Chenzhou Olympic Sports Centre Gymnasium, Chenzhou
Referees: Wang Mei (CHN), Ahmed Ali Yaseen Al-Suwaili (IRQ), Yang Xiaoguang (CHN)

12 October 2016
18:00

Boxscore

Al-Riyadi (Lebanon)	74–63	(Iran) Petrochimi
Scoring by quarter: 12–21, 20–14, 18–15, 24–13
Pts: Spencer 23; Rebs: Spencer 11; Asts: El Khatib, Spencer 3		Pts: White 22; Rebs: Arghavan, White 8 Asts: Robinson 3

Chenzhou Olympic Sports Centre Gymnasium, Chenzhou
Referees: Ferdinand Pascual (PHI), Ahmed Al Bulushi (OMA), Chan Owe Shiong (MAS)

=== Group B ===
Pos	Team	Pld	W	L	PF	PA	PD	Pts	Qualification
1	China Kashgar	4	4	0	425	276	+149	8	Quarterfinals
2	(United Arab Emirates) Al-Ahli	4	3	1	341	319	+22	7	Quarterfinals
3	(Iraq) Al-Shorta	4	2	2	330	301	+29	6	Quarterfinals
4	(Kazakhstan) Barsy Atyrau	4	1	3	297	344	−47	5	Quarterfinals
5	Malaysia Dragons	4	0	4	252	405	−153	4	

Source: FIBA Asia

8 October 2016
13:00

Boxscore

Al-Ahli (United Arab Emirates)	105–68	(Kazakhstan) Barsy Atyrau
Scoring by quarter: 31–15, 20–13, 25–21, 29–19
Pts: Young 50; Rebs: Samb 11; Asts: S. Alajmani 10		Pts: Ilin 15; Rebs: Yevstigneyev 10; Asts: Ilin 3

Chenzhou Olympic Sports Centre Gymnasium, Chenzhou
Referees: Walid Marcel Abirached (LIB), Chen Ying-cheng (TPE), Jafar Mohammad Pour (IRI)

8 October 2016
20:00

Boxscore

Al-Shorta (Iraq)	69–96	China Kashgar
Scoring by quarter: 15–28, 15–29, 18–11, 21–28
Pts: Hawkins 32; Rebs: Hawkins 9 Asts: Rice 5		Pts: Adams 23; Rebs: Sun T. 10; Asts: Adams 7

Chenzhou Olympic Sports Centre Gymnasium, Chenzhou
Referees: Marwan Egho (LIB), Imran Ali Baig (IND), Sadegh Ghanbaridamanab (IRI)

9 October 2016
15:00

Boxscore

Malaysia Dragons	62–106	(Iraq) Al-Shorta
Scoring by quarter: 14–21, 18–24, 12–27, 18–34
Pts: Spencer 22; Rebs: Spencer 14; Asts: Wright 4		Pts: Rice 36; Rebs: A. Al-Saedi 12; Asts: Al-Saymarlee 3

Chenzhou Olympic Sports Centre Gymnasium, Chenzhou
Referees: Walid Marcel Abirached (LIB), Snehal Bendke (IND), Sadegh Ghanbaridamanab (IRI)

9 October 2016
20:00

Boxscore

China Kashgar	108–79	(United Arab Emirates) Al-Ahli
Scoring by quarter: 21–21, 26–28, 29–13, 32–17
Pts: Adams 22; Rebs: Blatche 11; Asts: Blatche 7		Pts: Young 26; Rebs: Alshabebi, Young 9 Asts: S. Alajmani 6

Chenzhou Olympic Sports Centre Gymnasium, Chenzhou
Referees: Marwan Egho (LIB), Chen Ying-cheng (TPE), Jafar Mohammad Pour (IRI)

10 October 2016
15:00

Boxscore

Al-Ahli (United Arab Emirates)	81–69	Malaysia Dragons
Scoring by quarter: 19–24, 19–14, 21–14, 22–17
Pts: Young 32; Rebs: Alshabebi 17; Asts: S. Alajmani 10		Pts: Wright 21; Rebs: Spencer 21; Asts: Wright 6

Chenzhou Olympic Sports Centre Gymnasium, Chenzhou
Referees: Marwan Egho (LIB), Imran Ali Baig (IND), Chen Ying-cheng (TPE)

10 October 2016
20:00

Boxscore

Barsy Atyrau (Kazakhstan)	68–97	China Kashgar
Scoring by quarter: 10–19, 16–28, 19–25, 23–25
Pts: Yevstigneyev 21; Rebs: Micheev 8 Asts: Parks 6		Pts: Adams 21; Rebs: Sun M., Zhou 6 Asts: four players 3

Chenzhou Olympic Sports Centre Gymnasium, Chenzhou
Referees: Sadegh Ghanbaridamanab (IRI), Walid Marcel Abirached (LIB), Snehal Bendke (IND)

11 October 2016
15:00

Boxscore

Al-Shorta (Iraq)	74–76	(United Arab Emirates) Al-Ahli
Scoring by quarter: 15–10, 17–24, 15–25, 27–17
Pts: Hawkins 31; Rebs: A. Al-Saedi 22; Asts: three players 3		Pts: Alshabebi 26; Rebs: Alshabebi 17; Asts: Alshabebi, Young 3

Chenzhou Olympic Sports Centre Gymnasium, Chenzhou
Referees: Marwan Egho (LIB), Snehal Bendke (IND), Jafar Mohammad Pour (IRI)

11 October 2016
20:00

Boxscore

Malaysia Dragons	61–94	(Kazakhstan) Barsy Atyrau
Scoring by quarter: 8–24, 18–24, 15–22, 20–24
Pts: Kuek 15; Rebs: Kuek, Ma 6 Asts: Ma 6		Pts: Micheev 30; Rebs: Micheev 6 Asts: Parks 5

Chenzhou Olympic Sports Centre Gymnasium, Chenzhou
Referees: Chen Ying-cheng (TPE), Walid Marcel Abirached (LIB), Imran Ali Baig (IND)

12 October 2016
13:00

Boxscore

Barsy Atyrau (Kazakhstan)	67–81	(Iraq) Al-Shorta
Scoring by quarter: 20–17, 17–21, 19–23, 11–20
Pts: Micheev 20; Rebs: Micheev 12; Asts: Parks 6		Pts: Rice 31; Rebs: Hawkins 11; Asts: Hammoodi, Hawkins 3

Chenzhou Olympic Sports Centre Gymnasium, Chenzhou
Referees: Marwan Egho (LIB), Imran Ali Baig (IND), Sadegh Ghanbaridamanab (IRI)

12 October 2016
20:00

Boxscore

China Kashgar	124–60	Malaysia Dragons
Scoring by quarter: 39–5, 23–20, 37–18, 25–17
Pts: Adams 30; Rebs: Blatche 14; Asts: Wang 6		Pts: Wong 22; Rebs: Kuek 7 Asts: Choo, Kuek 2

Chenzhou Olympic Sports Centre Gymnasium, Chenzhou
Referees: Snehal Bendke (IND), Chen Ying-cheng (TPE), Jafar Mohammad Pour (IRI)

== Final round ==
5th place game
A3	(Chinese Taipei) Pauian	72
B3	(Iraq) Al-Shorta	81
7th place game
B4	(Kazakhstan) Barsy Atyrau	78
A4	(Qatar) Al-Rayyan	84

5th–8th place semifinals
B4	(Kazakhstan) Barsy Atyrau	64
A3	(Chinese Taipei) Pauian	72
A4	(Qatar) Al-Rayyan	63
B3	(Iraq) Al-Shorta	90

Quarterfinals
B4	(Kazakhstan) Barsy Atyrau	69
A1	(Lebanon) Al-Riyadi	88
B2	(United Arab Emirates) Al-Ahli	90
A3	(Chinese Taipei) Pauian	80
A4	(Qatar) Al-Rayyan	84
B1	China Kashgar (OT)	95
A2	(Iran) Petrochimi	88
B3	(Iraq) Al-Shorta	67

Semifinals
A1	(Lebanon) Al-Riyadi	107
B2	(United Arab Emirates) Al-Ahli	79
B1	China Kashgar	90
A2	(Iran) Petrochimi	86

Final
A1	(Lebanon) Al-Riyadi	88
B1	China Kashgar	96
Bronze medal game
B2	(United Arab Emirates) Al-Ahli	74
A2	(Iran) Petrochimi	100

=== Quarterfinals ===
14 October 2016
13:00

Boxscore

Petrochimi (Iran)	88–67	(Iraq) Al-Shorta
Scoring by quarter: 25–22, 12–18, 27–11, 24–16
Pts: Robinson 25; Rebs: Robinson 10; Asts: White 8		Pts: Hawkins 31; Rebs: A. Al-Saedi 11; Asts: Rice 6

Chenzhou Olympic Sports Centre Gymnasium, Chenzhou
Referees: Ahmed Al Bulushi (OMA), Walid Marcel Abirached (LIB), Snehal Bendke (IND)

14 October 2016
15:00

Boxscore

Al-Ahli (United Arab Emirates)	90–80	(Chinese Taipei) Pauian
Scoring by quarter: 19–25, 22–13, 21–19, 28–23
Pts: Young 40; Rebs: Alshabebi 14; Asts: M. Alajmani 7		Pts: Davis 20; Rebs: Davis 13; Asts: Tan 5

Chenzhou Olympic Sports Centre Gymnasium, Chenzhou
Referees: Ferdinand Pascual (PHI), Ahmed Ali Yaseen Al-Suwaili (IRQ), Jafar Mohammad Pour (IRI)

14 October 2016
18:00

Boxscore

Barsy Atyrau (Kazakhstan)	69–88	(Lebanon) Al-Riyadi
Scoring by quarter: 18–31, 7–22, 22–19, 22–16
Pts: Micheev 24; Rebs: Yevstigneyev 11; Asts: Gubashev, Ilin 3		Pts: El Khatib 18; Rebs: Aminu 10; Asts: Arakji 7

Chenzhou Olympic Sports Centre Gymnasium, Chenzhou
Referees: Chan Owe Shiong (MAS), Sadegh Ghanbaridamanab (IRI), Yang Xiaoguang (CHN)

14 October 2016
20:00

Boxscore

Al-Rayyan (Qatar)	84–95 (OT)	China Kashgar
Scoring by quarter: 22–23, 22–16, 18–16, 13–20, Overtime: 9–20
Pts: Knowles 37; Rebs: Abdelhaleem 17; Asts: Knowles 4		Pts: Adams 27; Rebs: Zhou 12; Asts: Blatche 5

Chenzhou Olympic Sports Centre Gymnasium, Chenzhou
Referees: Marwan Egho (LIB), Imran Ali Baig (IND), Chen Ying-cheng (TPE)

=== Classification 5th–8th ===
15 October 2016
9:00

Boxscore

Pauian (Chinese Taipei)	72–64	(Kazakhstan) Barsy Atyrau
Scoring by quarter: 14–11, 21–17, 21–25, 16–11
Pts: Lee 21; Rebs: Davis 11; Asts: Lee 4		Pts: Ilin 27; Rebs: Micheev 11; Asts: Parks 4

Chenzhou Olympic Sports Centre Gymnasium, Chenzhou
Referees: Marwan Egho (LIB), Sadegh Ghanbaridamanab (IRI), Wang Mei (CHN)

15 October 2016
11:00

Boxscore

Al-Shorta (Iraq)	90–63	(Qatar) Al-Rayyan
Scoring by quarter: 19–14, 24–16, 16–19, 31–14
Pts: Hawkins 37; Rebs: Hawkins 14; Asts: Al-Mayali, Hawkins 3		Pts: Knowles 24; Rebs: Knowles 10; Asts: Knowles 4

Chenzhou Olympic Sports Centre Gymnasium, Chenzhou
Referees: Yang Xiaoguang (CHN), Walid Marcel Abirached (LIB), Jafar Mohammad Pour (IRI)

=== Semifinals ===
15 October 2016
16:30

Boxscore

Al-Riyadi (Lebanon)	107–79	(United Arab Emirates) Al-Ahli
Scoring by quarter: 25–15, 20–25, 31–22, 31–17
Pts: Spencer 26; Rebs: Aminu 11; Asts: Arakji 11		Pts: Young 32; Rebs: Alshabebi 18; Asts: M. Alajmani 5

Chenzhou Olympic Sports Centre Gymnasium, Chenzhou
Referees: Ahmed Al Bulushi (OMA), Imran Ali Baig (IND), Chan Owe Shiong (MAS)

15 October 2016
20:00

Boxscore

China Kashgar	90–86	(Iran) Petrochimi
Scoring by quarter: 25–28, 20–25, 24–20, 21–13
Pts: Blatche 27; Rebs: Blatche 10; Asts: Adams 6		Pts: White, Yakhchali 26; Rebs: Hassanzadeh 8 Asts: Robinson 5

Chenzhou Olympic Sports Centre Gymnasium, Chenzhou
Referees: Ferdinand Pascual (PHI), Ahmed Ali Yaseen Al-Suwaili (IRQ), Snehal Bendke (IND)

=== Seventh place game ===
16 October 2016
9:00

Boxscore

Barsy Atyrau (Kazakhstan)	78–84	(Qatar) Al-Rayyan
Scoring by quarter: 30–14, 16–27, 17–21, 15–22
Pts: Micheev 22; Rebs: Micheev 16; Asts: Parks 6		Pts: Knowles 49; Rebs: Matalkeh 7 Asts: Al-Khanji, Knowles 2

Chenzhou Olympic Sports Centre Gymnasium, Chenzhou
Referees: Sadegh Ghanbaridamanab (IRI), Chan Owe Shiong (MAS), Chen Ying-cheng (TPE)

=== Fifth place game ===
16 October 2016
11:00

Boxscore

Pauian (Chinese Taipei)	72–81	(Iraq) Al-Shorta
Scoring by quarter: 19–18, 14–19, 21–26, 18–18
Pts: Tan 19; Rebs: Davis 18; Asts: Shih 4		Pts: Rice 32; Rebs: A. Al-Saedi 12; Asts: Hawkins, Rice 4

Chenzhou Olympic Sports Centre Gymnasium, Chenzhou
Referees: Walid Marcel Abirached (LIB), Imran Ali Baig (IND), Jafar Mohammad Pour (IRI)

=== Third place game ===
16 October 2016
14:30

Boxscore

Al-Ahli (United Arab Emirates)	74–100	(Iran) Petrochimi
Scoring by quarter: 17–18, 18–22, 19–31, 20–29
Pts: Young 43; Rebs: Young 10; Asts: S. Alajmani 2		Pts: White, Yakhchali 22; Rebs: White 19; Asts: Robinson 7

Chenzhou Olympic Sports Centre Gymnasium, Chenzhou
Referees: Marwan Egho (LIB), Ahmed Ali Yaseen Al-Suwaili (IRQ), Wang Mei (CHN)

=== Final ===
16 October 2016
17:00

Boxscore

Al-Riyadi (Lebanon)	88–96	China Kashgar
Scoring by quarter: 19–26, 21–22, 15–25, 33–23
Pts: El Khatib 23; Rebs: Abdelnour 11; Asts: Spencer 12		Pts: Blatche 22; Rebs: Zhou 9 Asts: Adams 13

Chenzhou Olympic Sports Centre Gymnasium, Chenzhou
Referees: Ferdinand Pascual (PHI), Ahmed Al Bulushi (OMA), Snehal Bendke (IND)

== Final ranking ==
Rank	Team	Record
1st place, gold medalist(s)	China Kashgar	7–0
2nd place, silver medalist(s)	(Lebanon) Al-Riyadi	6–1
3rd place, bronze medalist(s)	(Iran) Petrochimi	5–2
4th	(United Arab Emirates) Al-Ahli	4–3
5th	(Iraq) Al-Shorta	4–3
6th	(Chinese Taipei) Pauian	3–4
7th	(Qatar) Al-Rayyan	2–5
8th	(Kazakhstan) Barsy Atyrau	1–6
9th	(India) ONGC	0–4
10th	Malaysia Dragons	0–4

== Awards ==
Most Valuable Player
(United States) Dewarick Spencer

=== All-Star Five ===
Pos	Player	Club
F	(Lebanon) Fadi El Khatib	(Lebanon) Al-Riyadi
F	(United States) Sam Young	(United Arab Emirates) Al-Ahli
C	(Philippines) Andray Blatche	China Kashgar
G	(United States) Dewarick Spencer (MVP)	(Lebanon) Al-Riyadi
G	(United States) Darius Adams	China Kashgar
