= Mohamed Koné (basketball) =

Ivorian basketball player

Mohamed Kone
No. 15 – JA Vichy-Clermont
- Position: Power forward
- League: LNB Pro B

Personal information
- Born: March 24, 1981 (age 45) Abidjan, Ivory Coast
- Listed height: 6 ft 11 in (2.11 m)
- Listed weight: 240 lb (110 kg)

Career information
- College: College of Southern Idaho (2003–2005); Valparaiso (2005–2006)
- Playing career: 2006–present

Career history
- 2006–2007: Élan Chalon
- 2007–2009: Chorale Roanne
- 2009–2010: Erdemirspor
- 2010–2011: San Sebastián Gipuzkoa
- 2011–2012: Lucentum Alicante
- 2012–2013: Foolad Mahan Isfahan
- 2013–2014: Sanaye Petrochimi Mahshah
- 2014–2015: AMSB
- 2015–2016: Al Sadd
- 2016: ESSM Le Portel
- 2016–2017: Étoile Charleville-Mézières
- 2017–2021: JA Vichy-Clermont
Medals
Men's basketball
Representing Ivory Coast
FIBA AfroBasket
Silver medal – second place	2009 Libya

Mohamed Koné (born March 24, 1981) is an Ivorian professional basketball player currently playing for JA Vichy-Clermont of the LNB Pro B. He is also a member of the Côte d'Ivoire national basketball team.

Kone spent one year playing NCAA Division I basketball at Valparaiso University after transferring from the College of Southern Idaho, whom he led to a third-place finish in the nation at the junior college level in 2004–05. He averaged 10.9 PPG and 8 RPG in 27 games for the Crusaders. At Valparaiso, Kone came under some scrutiny during an NCAA investigation regarding his travel to Valparaiso's campus before enrolling as a student, resulting in him missing a handful of midseason games.

After his college career, Kone moved to play professional basketball in France, spending one year playing for ÉS Chalon-sur-Saône and another playing for Chorale Roanne Basket. At Roanne, Kone helped lead the team to the semifinals of the 2008 French La Semaine des As Cup by averaging 4.9 points and 4.6 rebounds per game during the season. Kone announced he would play the 2009 season in Turkey on July 20, 2009.

In July 2010 he signed a one-year contract with Lagun Aro GBC in Spain.

On November 2, 2014, he signed with Lebanese club Champville.

Kone helped lead his native Côte d'Ivoire national basketball team to a silver medal at the 2009 FIBA Africa Championship, its first podium finish since 1985. Kone averaged 10.2 PPG and 8.3 RPG in nine games of action throughout the tournament.
