= Sani Bečirović =

Slovenian basketball player (born 1981)

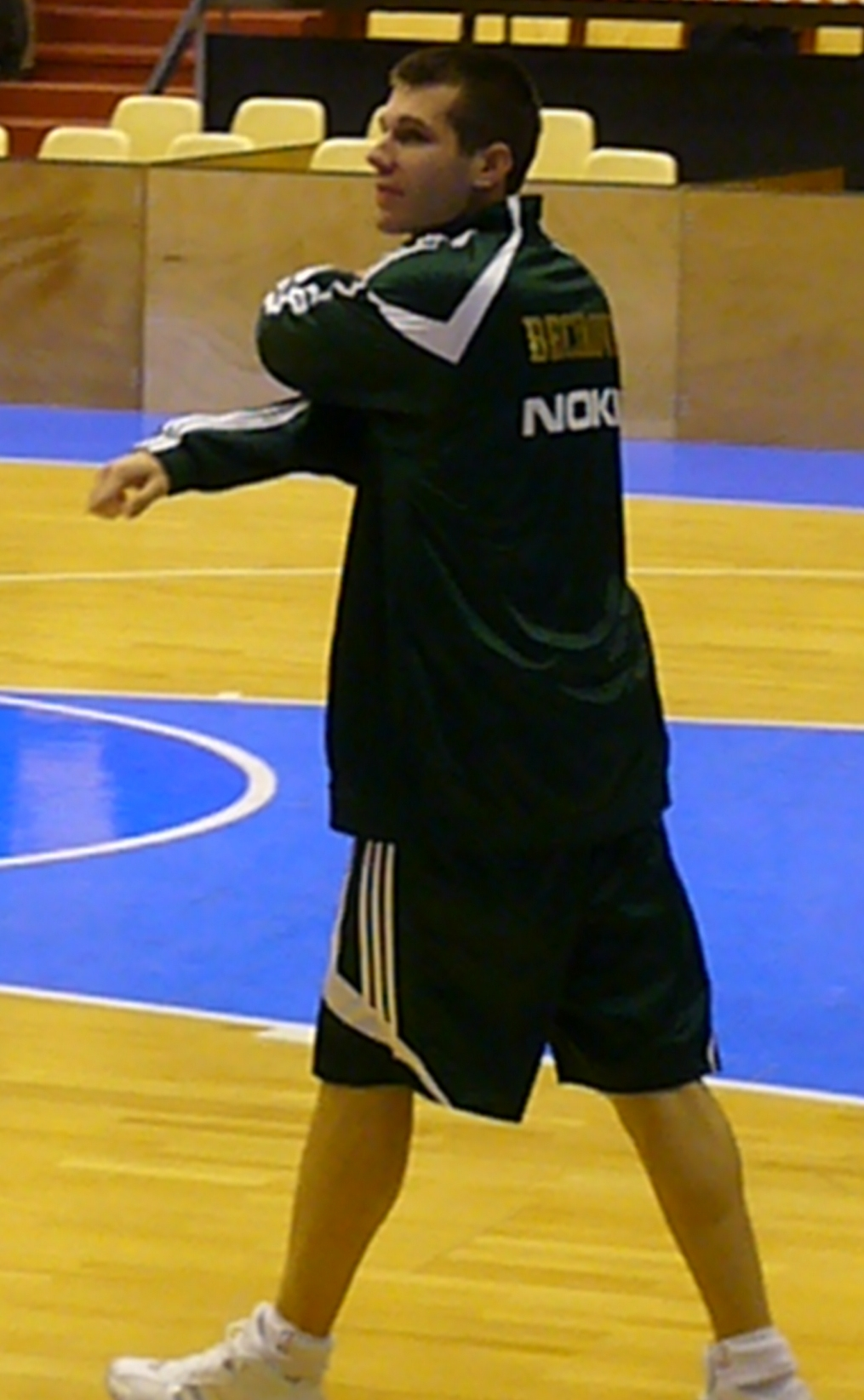
- Bečirović with Panathinaikos in 2007

Partizan Belgrade
- Title: Director
- League: Serbian SuperLeague; ABA League; EuroLeague

Personal information
- Born: 19 May 1981 (age 45) Maribor, SR Slovenia, SFR Yugoslavia
- Listed height: 6 ft 5 in (1.96 m)
- Listed weight: 210 lb (95 kg)

Career information
- NBA draft: 2003: 2nd round, 46th overall pick
- Drafted by: Denver Nuggets
- Playing career: 1995–2015
- Position: Shooting guard / point guard
- Number: 7, 10
- Coaching career: 2015–2016

Career history

Playing
- 1995–1996: Bistrica
- 1996–1997: Maribor Ovni
- 1997–1999: Pivovarna Laško
- 1999–2001: Union Olimpija
- 2001–2002: Virtus Bologna
- 2003–2004: Krka
- 2004–2005: Varese
- 2005–2006: Fortitudo Bologna
- 2006–2008: Panathinaikos
- 2008–2009: Virtus Roma
- 2009: Union Olimpija
- 2010: Olimpia Milano
- 2010–2011: Türk Telekom
- 2011: CSKA Moscow
- 2011–2012: Benetton Treviso
- 2012–2013: Petrochimi Bandar Imam
- 2013: Dinamo Sassari
- 2013: Foolad Mahan Isfahan
- 2013–2014: Krka
- 2014–2015: Fulgor Libertas Forlì
- 2015: Pallacanestro Piacentina

Coaching
- 2015–2016: Panathinaikos (assistant coach)

Career highlights
- As player: EuroLeague champion (2007); FIBA EuroStar (2007); Italian Cup winner (2002); 2× Greek League champion (2007, 2008); 2× Greek Cup winner (2007, 2008); Greek All Star Game 3-point shootout champion (2007); Slovenian League champion (2001); 3× Slovenian Cup winner (2000, 2001, 2014); Slovenian Cup MVP (2014); FIBA Europe Under-18 Championship MVP (1998); FIBA Europe Under-20 Championship MVP (2000); As executive manager': EuroLeague champion (2024); Greek League champion (2024); Greek Cup winner (2025)
- Stats at Basketball Reference

Sani Bečirović (born 19 May 1981) is a Slovenian professional basketball executive, former player and coach, who currently serves as the director for Partizan of the Serbian SuperLeague, the ABA League, and the EuroLeague. As a player, he was selected in the second round (46th overall) of the 2003 NBA draft by the Denver Nuggets, but never played in the NBA. His father is Memi Bečirović, the former head coach of the senior men's Slovenia national team.

== Professional career ==
Bečirović played with the Slovenian youth squad teams of KK Bistrica, and he made his debut with their senior team during the 1995–96 season. He then moved to the Slovenian club Maribor Ovni for the 1996–97 season. He then moved to the Slovenian Premiere A League team Pivovarna Laško, where he played from 1997 to 1999, and next to the Slovenian team Olimpija Ljubljana, where he played from 1999 to 2001. With Olimpija Ljubljana, he won the 2001 Slovenian League Championship, and the 2000 and 2001 Slovenian Cups. He also played in Slovenia with Krka Novo Mesto, in the 2003–04 season.

He played in the Italian LBA league with Virtus Bologna, during the 2001–02 season, where he won the 2002 Italian Cup. He also played with the Italian clubs Casti Group Varese, in the 2004–05 season, and Climamio Bologna, in the 2005–06 season, where he won the 2005 Italian Super Cup.

Bečirović then moved to the Greek club Panathinaikos, where he won the EuroLeague 2006–07 championship, two Greek Cups (2007, 2008), and two Greek League championships (2007, 2008). He signed with the Italian club AJ Milano on 15 January 2010. In October 2010, he signed a two-year contract with the Turkish Super League club Türk Telekom. In March 2011, he left Türk Telekom, by mutual agreement, and then signed with the Russian club CSKA Moscow, until the end of the 2010–11 season. In August 2011, he moved to the Italian club Benetton Treviso, for one season.

In October 2012, he signed with the Iranian Super League club Petrochimi Bandar Imam. On 14 April 2013, Bečirović signed with the Italian club Dinamo Sassari, until the end of the season. In August 2013, he returned to Iran, and signed a one-year deal with Foolad Mahan Isfahan.

In December 2013, Bečirović returned to the Slovenian club Krka Novo Mesto, for the 2013–14 season. In August 2014, he signed with Fulgor Libertas Forlì of the Italian Second Division. On 4 January 2015, he left Forli, and signed with Pallacanestro Piacentina of the Italian 3rd Division. On 16 March 2015, he parted ways with Piacentina.

== National team career ==
Bečirović was a member of the senior men's Slovenian national basketball team that competed at the 1999 EuroBasket, 2001 EuroBasket, 2005 EuroBasket, and the 2006 FIBA World Championship. He also played at the 2008 FIBA World Olympic Qualifying Tournament and at the 2010 FIBA World Championship.

== Post-playing career ==
=== Coaching career ===
Right after retiring from being a professional basketball player, Bečirović returned to the Greek club Panathinaikos, where he worked as an assistant coach to Aleksandar Đorđević for one season.

=== Executive career ===
On 13 June 2019, Bečirović was appointed as the sports director of the newly formed Slovenian club Cedevita Olimpija.

On 16 June 2023, Bečirović was appointed sporting director of Panathinaikos, returning once more to the Greek powerhouse. In June 2025, he parted ways with the club.

On 11 July 2025, he signed a three-year deal to become the sporting director for Zenit Saint Petersburg of the VTB United League. On 12 November 2026, Bečirović mutually parted ways with the team due to personal reasons.

On 19 November 2026, Bečirović was appointed club director of Partizan.

== Personal life ==
Bečirović is married to Italian Simona, and he also holds an Italian passport. The couple have one daughter (Samija, born 2005), and one son (Kiam, born 2008). In 2013, he established the Sani Bečirović Basketball Academy, of which he is currently the sports director.

His nickname is "Sani Boy".
