= In the Shadows (book) =

2024 book by Mickey Bergman and Ellis Henican

In the Shadows: True Stories of High-Stakes Negotiations to Free Americans Captured Abroad is a non-fiction book by Mickey Bergman, co-authored with Ellis Henican, released on June 4, 2024. The book provides insight into the world of international hostage negotiations.

== Overview ==
The book provides perspective on the complexities of securing the release of Americans wrongfully detained abroad. Mickey Bergman, a negotiator with the Richardson Center for Global Engagement, shares his experiences dealing with challenging international leaders and hard diplomatic environments.

== Key themes ==
Bergman tells of his involvement in several high-profile cases, such as those of Brittney Griner, Danny Fenster, Otto Warmbier, Trevor Reed, and Paul Whelan. He tells of non-traditional methods. A significant portion of the book focuses on Bergman's work with his mentor, Bill Richardson, the late former governor of New Mexico and a negotiator. Bergman shares insights into Richardson's methods and his significant influence on Bergman's career. The book explores the emotional challenges faced by negotiators and the families of hostages, highlighting the emotional intelligence and psychological resilience required to handle these cases.

== Authors ==
Mickey Bergman is the director of Global Reach, an organization specializing in negotiating the release of political prisoners and hostages worldwide. Bergman has over a decade of experience in hostage negotiations.

Ellis Henican is an author, journalist, and television commentator. He has co-authored several non-fiction books.
