= Chris Williams (basketball) =

American basketball player (1980–2017)

Personal information
- Born: July 9, 1980 Birmingham, Alabama, U.S.
- Died: March 15, 2017 (aged 36) Birmingham, Alabama, U.S.
- Listed height: 6 ft 6 in (1.98 m)

Career information
- High school: Minor (Adamsville, Alabama)
- College: Virginia (1998–2002)
- NBA draft: 2002: undrafted
- Playing career: 2002–2013
- Position: Small forward

Career history
- 2002–2003: Sydney Kings
- 2003–2005: Skyliners Frankfurt
- 2005–2007: Mobis Phoebus
- 2007–2008: Türk Telekom
- 2008–2009: Qingdao Double Star
- 2009: San Miguel Beermen
- 2009–2010: Qingdao Double Star
- 2010–2011: Mahram Tehran
- 2011–2012: Goyang Orions
- 2012–2013: Foolad Mahan Isfahan

Career highlights
- EuroLeague steals leader (2005); CBA steals leader (2010); KBL champion (2007); KBL Season Best 5 (2006); KBL Foreign Player MVP (2006); German League Finals MVP (2005); German League Most Valuable Player (2005); NBL champion (2003); NBL Grand Final MVP (2003); NBL Most Valuable Player (2003); All-NBL First Team (2003); Second-team All-ACC (2000); 2× Third-team All-ACC (1999, 2001); ACC Rookie of the Year (1999)
Medals
Representing United States
Men's basketball
FIBA U19 World Championship
Silver medal – second place	1999 Lisbon	Team competition

Christopher Anthony Williams (July 9, 1980 – March 15, 2017) was an American professional basketball player. He was a 6 ft 6 in tall (198 cm) small forward.

== College career ==
Williams played college basketball at the University of Virginia, with the Virginia Cavaliers. He was named the ACC Rookie of the Year in 1999. He was also named Second Team All-ACC in 2000, and Third Team All-ACC in 1999 and 2001. He had the nickname "Big Smooth".

== Professional career ==
Williams led the 2004–05 EuroLeague in steals, with 2.8 per game, while playing with the Frankfurt Skyliners. He won the Germany BBL championship with Frankfurt, in 2004. From 2005 to 2007, he played in South Korea's KBL, with Ulsan Mobis Phoebus. He also played with Qingdao DoubleStar in China's CBA, and with Mahram Tehran in Iran's Basketball Super League.

Prior to playing in the EuroLeague, Williams played as an import for the Sydney Kings in Australia's NBL. With the Kings, he was a leading scorer, he shot at a high percentage, and he was a top rated rebounder, which were key components to the Kings winning their first ever NBL championship. He was awarded the MVP of the league, and the MVP of the league's final.

In a game between Qingdao and Dongguan Leopards, on December 25, 2009, Williams produced the second ever Quadruple-double in CBA history, as he finished the game with 15 points, 11 rebounds, 11 assists, and 11 steals. Qingdao won the game 122–103.

On October 10, 2013, Williams was named to the Sydney Kings' 25th Anniversary Team.

== Personal ==
Williams died on March 15, 2017, due to blood clots in his heart.
