= Saman Veisi =

Iranian basketball player

No. 6 – Foolad Mahan
- Position: Guard
- League: Iranian League

Personal information
- Born: 7 August 1982 (age 44) Sanandaj, Iran
- Listed height: 1.91 m (6 ft 3 in)

Career history
- 2006–2007: Petrochimi
- 2008–2009: Saba Mehr
- 2009–2010: Shahrdari Gorgan
- 2010–2012: Petrochimi
- 2012–2013: Foolad Mahan

Saman Veisi
Medal record

Men's basketball

Representing Iran

Asian Games
Bronze medal – third place	2006 Doha	Team

Asian Championship
Gold medal – first place	2013 Manila	Team

Saman Veisi (Persian: سامان ویسی, born 7 August 1982) is an Iranian professional basketball player. He currently plays for Foolad Mahan in the Iranian Super League, as well as for the Iranian national basketball team, as a guard.
