= Al-Shorta SC (basketball) =

Basketball section of Al-Shorta Sports Club

Al-Shorta
- Leagues: Iraqi Basketball Premier League
- Founded: 1932; 94 years ago
- Arena: Al-Shaab Hall
- Location: Baghdad, Iraq
- Team colors: Green, white, purple
- President: Abdul-Halim Fahem
- Head coach: Ghassan Sarkis
- Ownership: Al-Shorta SC
- Championships: 3 Iraqi Premier Leagues; 1 Iraqi Perseverance Cup
- Website: alshortasc.com
| Home | Away |

Al-Shorta SC Basketball is a professional basketball team based in Baghdad, Iraq. It is a part of the Al-Shorta SC multi-sports club, whose origins date back to 1932. The team has won three Iraqi Basketball Premier League titles, most recently in the 2014–15 season, and has won one Iraqi Basketball Perseverance Cup title.

Al-Shorta have previously finished in fifth place at both the FIBA Asia Champions Cup and the WABA Champions Cup, and have finished in fourth place at the Arab Club Basketball Championship. Al-Shorta finished in fourth place in the West Asia sub-zone in the 2023–24 West Asia Super League.

== History ==
Sports teams began to form within the Iraqi Police force in 1932, starting with the football team. Basketball teams were formed under the names Madaris Al-Shorta (Police Schools) and Al-Quwa Al-Siyara (Mobile Force), and both teams participated in the Young Men's Muslim Association Cup in 1951. After the foundation of the Iraqi Basketball Association, a regional league system was established for basketball teams in Baghdad and its neighbouring cities, and it was decided that an Al-Shorta Select team would represent the Police in the top division.

Al-Shorta Select reached the final of the Baghdad Basketball First Division Championship in 1961, but lost the championship game 62–73 to Al-Hawat. Al-Shorta Select participated in the Iraqi Liwas Basketball Cup in 1962, a competition played between select teams from different Iraqi provinces, losing their opening group match 36–58 to the Baghdad Civilian Select team. Al-Shorta Select also played matches against visiting foreign teams, including a match with the Lebanese Middle East Airlines team in Baghdad in April 1963, and a match with the American Military team on 22 November 1965 which they lost 71–107. In 1966, Al-Shorta Select lost the final of the Republican Cup by a score of 69–79 against the Armed Forces Select team.

In 1974, a clubs-only policy was introduced to Iraqi national sport, which led to the establishment of Al-Shorta Sports Club, and the club was officially registered with the Ministry of Youth and Sports in 1978. The Iraqi Basketball Premier League (the first nationwide league of basketball clubs in Iraq) was established in 1980, and Al-Shorta finished in third place in the inaugural season behind winners Al-Jaish and runners-up Al-Karkh.

Al-Shorta won their first league title in the 1994–95 season under the leadership of coach Jabbar Kamil, and they retained the league title in the 1995–96 season, with their captain Abbas Khudhair being named the Player of the Season. In 2012, Al-Shorta participated in the Arab Club Basketball Championship and finished in fourth place. Al-Shorta won their third league title in the 2014–15 season, defeating Al-Karkh in the best-of-three final series after a three-point field goal from DeAndre Rice in the final seconds of the third game which Al-Shorta won 90–89.

Their title win qualified them for the 2016 FIBA Asia Champions Cup and the 2016 WABA Champions Cup, finishing in fifth place in both tournaments, as well as the 2015 Arab Club Basketball Championship where they reached the quarter-finals. From the 2016–17 season until the 2022–23 season, Al-Shorta reached the final of the Iraqi Basketball Premier League six times consecutively, but lost each time to Al-Naft. Al-Shorta won their first Iraqi Basketball Perseverance Cup title in 2022 by defeating Dijlah Al-Jamiea 87–80. Al-Shorta entered the FIBA West Asia Super League for the first time in the 2023–24 season and finished in fourth place in the West Asia sub-zone.

== Players ==
=== Current roster ===
Note: Flags indicate national team eligibility at FIBA-sanctioned events. Players may hold other non-FIBA nationalities not displayed.

Al-Shorta SC roster
Players
Coaches

| Pos. | No. | Nat. | Name | Ht. | Wt. | Age |
|---|---|---|---|---|---|---|
| PG | 2 | (United States) | Jones, Lamont | 1.85 m (6 ft 1 in) | | 36 – 26 June 1990 |
| G | 3 | (Iraq) | Alalili, Mustafa | 1.95 m (6 ft 5 in) | | 25 – 17 July 2001 |
| PG | 5 | (Iraq) | Alrubaye, Alhur | 1.82 m (6 ft 0 in) | | 24 – 10 February 2002 |
| SG | 7 | (Iraq) | Abdullah, Hassan | 1.88 m (6 ft 2 in) | | 34 – 4 February 1992 |
| SG | 8 | (Iraq) | Alazawi, Omar | 1.88 m (6 ft 2 in) | | 38 – 12 May 1988 |
| F | 11 | (Iraq) | Al-Nasrawi, Muntadher Hasan Ali | 1.92 m (6 ft 4 in) | | 22 – 2 September 2004 |
| PF | 12 | (Iraq) | Talib, Hussein | 1.98 m (6 ft 6 in) | | 36 – 1 June 1990 |
| C | 15 | (Iraq) | Al-Khafaji, Mohammed | 2.09 m (6 ft 10 in) | | 35 – 7 July 1991 |
| C | 21 | (Iraq) | Nahi, Malik | 2.08 m (6 ft 10 in) | | 40 – 26 August 1986 |
| G | 22 | (United States) | Wesley, Byron | 1.96 m (6 ft 5 in) | | 33 – 26 December 1992 |
| PF | 23 | (United States) | Graham, Delwan | 2.00 m (6 ft 7 in) | | 37 – 27 October 1988 |
| PF | 24 | (Iraq) | Ismael, Ali | 2.00 m (6 ft 7 in) | | 37 – 13 August 1989 |
| SG | 77 | (Iraq) | Almahmud, Hussein | 1.90 m (6 ft 3 in) | | 30 – 28 September 1996 |

Head coach

- (Lebanon) Ghassan Sarkis

Assistant coach(es)

- (Iraq) Najm Mahdi

Legend

- (C) Team captain
- Injured

- Roster
Updated: December 8, 2023

== Honours ==
- Iraqi Basketball Premier League: 3
  - 1994–95, 1995–96, 2014–15
- Iraqi Basketball Perseverance Cup: 1
  - 2022
