= Saeid Davarpanah =

Iranian professional basketball player

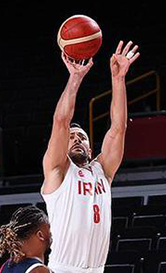

No. 89 – Naft Abadan
- Positions: Shooting guard, small forward
- League: Iranian League

Personal information
- Born: September 7, 1987 (age 39) Tehran, Iran
- Listed height: 6 ft 2 in (1.88 m)
- Listed weight: 210 lb (95 kg)

Career information
- NBA draft: 2006: undrafted
- Playing career: 2004–present

Career history
- 2004–2007: Paykan
- 2007–2008: Kaveh
- 2008–2010: Petrochimi
- 2010–2011: Towzin Electric
- 2011–2012: Petrochimi
- 2012–2013: Hamyari Shahrdari
- 2013–2015: Mahram
- 2015–2016: Petrochimi
- 2016–2017: Naft Abadan
- 2017–2018: Petrochimi
- 2018–2021: Naft Abadan
- 2021–2022: Mahram
- 2022–present: Naft Abadan
Medals
Representing (Iran)
Asian Games
Asian Championship
Bronze medal – third place	2019 Bangkok	Team
Bronze medal – third place	2015 Changsha	Team
Asian Games
Bronze medal – third place	2010 Guangzhou	Team

Saeid Davarpanah (Persian: سعید داورپناه, born September 7, 1987) is an Iranian professional basketball player, currently playing as a guard for Naft Abadan in the Iranian Basketball Super League. He is also a member of the Iranian national basketball team and competed at the 2008 Olympic Basketball Tournament.He was the youngest basketball player of Iran national basketball team at the 2008 Olympic Basketball He has been recognized as the best player in the Iranian Basketball League several times since 2008. He also competed in the 2019 FIBA Asia Champions Cup, and his brilliance in these competitions made him more popular among the fans of the Iran Basketball League. He is especially popular among league fans in southern Iran due to his long and colorful presence in the Naft Abadan and Petrochimi.

== Honours ==
=== National team ===
- Asian Games
  - Bronze: 2010, Guangzhou, China
- 2019 FIBA Asia Champions Cup
  - Bronze: 2019, Bangkok, Thailand
