= Rouben Vesmadian =

Personal information
- Born: 30 December 1982 (age 42); Sydney, Australia

Sport
- Country: Australia Armenia
- Sport: Basketball
- Club: Petrochimi Bandar Imam BC DJK Munchen Eintracht Frankfurt

Rouben "Redd" Vesmadian (Armenian: Ռուբեն Վեսմադյան; born 30 December 1982) is an Australian-Armenian professional basketball player. Vesmadian played one season for Fresno State followed by various stints in Australia, Asia, Europe and Africa.

== Career ==
Vesmadian was born in Sydney, Australia. He led Narrabeen Sports High School to one of the top teams in NSW between 1999 and 2000 before attending Fresno State in 2001/02 and playing for Jerry Tarkanian in his final season as a head coach. Vesmadian signed his first professional contract in the Iranian Super League and played for Petrochimi Bandar Imam BC. The following season Vesmadian was awarded Egyptian citizenship as the son of an Egyptian-born Armenian to compete in the Egyptian Pro League. In 2005, Vesmadian signed with DJK Munchen in the German Regional League before transferring to Eintracht Frankfurt.
