= Ellis Henican =

American political analyst and author

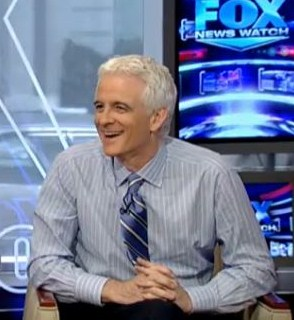
- Henican on the set of Fox News Watch in 2010
- Born: October 9, 1958 (age 68); Virginia, U.S.
- Education: Jesuit High School (New Orleans)
- Alma mater: Hampshire College (BA); Columbia University (MA)
- Occupations: Columnist, author, talk radio, entertainer, voice actor, television, political analyst
- Notable work: "Home Team"
- Spouse: Stephanie Carvlin
- Parent(s): C. Ellis, Jr., and Patricia McGraw Henican
- Relatives: Peggy Wilson (aunt)
- Website: http://www.henican.com/

Ellis Henican (born October 9, 1958) is an American columnist at Newsday and AM New York as well as a political analyst on the Fox News Channel. He hosts a nationally syndicated weekend show on Talk Radio Network and is the voice of "Stormy" on the Cartoon Network series Sealab 2021. He is the co-author of the New York Times bestseller The Party's Over: How the Extreme Right Hijacked the GOP and I Became a Democrat.

== Biography ==
Henican earned a bachelor's degree in political science from Hampshire College. He has a master's degree from the Columbia University Graduate School of Journalism, where he won the top student prize, the Pulitzer Traveling Fellowship. He began his career as a reporter at The Kentucky Post and the Albany (New York) Knickerbockers News.

Henican wrote Newsday's subway column. In 1992, he was part of the Newsday staff when they received a Pulitzer Prize for spot reporting for their coverage of the 14th Street – Union Square (New York City Subway) train wreck.

In recent years, Henican has built a strong presence on television and radio, appearing on most of the major broadcast and cable networks. He has appeared on Fox News Channel, since 1999, where he has made appearances on The O'Reilly Factor, Fox News Watch, Red Eye w/ Greg Gutfeld and other programs. He was also involved in coverage of the 2008 presidential campaign, the War in Iraq, and other major stories. Henican's early television experience included co-hosting a weekly transit program on NY1, New York's all-news channel. His weekly "Culture Clash" segments—an irreverent look at television, movies and pop-culture trends – were a popular daytime feature on the USA Network.

Henican's weekend radio program, The Ellis Henican Show, is syndicated to stations across the country by Talk Radio Network. Henican has also guest-hosted for Alan Colmes, Michael Savage, Bob Grant and Jerry Doyle. He also co-hosts Henican & White on WOR in New York, and has a news-driven weekend show on WBBR.

In 2010, Henican authored Home Team with New Orleans Saints coach Sean Payton. It was a New York Times Best Seller recounting the story of post-Katrina New Orleans and the Saints' Super Bowl championship that year. In 2011, to commemorate the 10th anniversary of the death of NASCAR driver Dale Earnhardt, Henican wrote another bestseller, In the Blink of An Eye: Dale, Daytona, and the Day that Changed Everything with driver Michael Waltrip. Henican has ghost-written two books for Simon & Schuster—an inside account of the nation's largest drug-treatment program and a best-selling motivational business book.

His articles have been published in various national magazines, including The New Republic, Cosmopolitan and Penthouse.

Henican also provided the voice for Derek "Stormy" Waters on the popular Cartoon Network series, Sealab 2021. A special feature called "Stormy Waters, Pundit" on the Sealab 2021 Season 3 DVD animates Henican's political commentary with visuals of Stormy Waters in and around Sealab. Henican also lent his voice to pundit Harper Ellis on Frisky Dingo, which was made by the creators of Sealab 2021.

In 2024, Ellis Henican co-wrote "In the Shadows: True Stories of High-Stakes Negotiations to Free Americans Captured Abroad" with Mickey Bergman. The memoir details Bergman's role in high-stakes hostage negotiations, providing an insider's perspective on the efforts to secure the release of Americans held captive overseas.

Henican lives in the Tribeca area of downtown New York City.

== Awards ==
- Recipient of the Meyer Berger award for distinguished writing about New York City
- Recipient of the National Clarion Award for column writing
