= Preston Knowles =

American basketball player

Personal information
- Born: March 29, 1989 (age 37) Winchester, Kentucky, U.S.
- Listed height: 185 cm (6 ft 1 in)
- Listed weight: 88 kg (194 lb)

Career information
- High school: George Rogers Clark (Winchester, Kentucky)
- College: Louisville (2007–2011)
- NBA draft: 2011: undrafted
- Playing career: 2011–2020
- Position: Point guard

Career history
- 2011: Dnipro-Azot
- 2011–2012: Springfield Armor
- 2013: K.A.O.D.
- 2013–2015: Ironi Nes Ziona
- 2015–2016: Giorgio Tesi Group Pistoia
- 2016: AEK Larnaca
- 2016–2017: Maccabi Ashdod
- 2017–2018: Zadar
- 2018–2019: Derthona Basket
- 2019: Aurora Jesi
- 2019–2020: Mono Vampire

Preston Demond Knowles (born March 29, 1989) is an American former professional basketball player for Aurora Jesi of the Italian Serie A2 Basket. He formerly played college basketball for the Louisville Cardinals.

== High school and college career ==
Knowles attended George Rogers Clark High School in his native Winchester, Kentucky. He stayed in the state for college, signing with Louisville, playing in the Big East Conference of the NCAA Division I, in 2007. Playing for the Cardinals, he was noted for his work ethic, defense, and three-point shooting, regularly amongst the best in the Conference in shooting percentage from three.

== Professional career ==
Knowles signed a contract with Ukrainian Basketball SuperLeague side Dnipro-Azot in December 2012, he ended up playing in 3 games in the league before leaving the side that same month.

The American then returned home, signing with the Springfield Armor of the NBA Development League in January 2012. He finished the 2011–12 season with the Armor, averaging 7.3 points, 1.1 assists and 1.1 steals in nearly 17 minutes per game after playing 31 games.

After another stint with Dnipro-Azot in which he didn't play a competitive game, Knowles moved to Greek Basket League K.A.O.D. American Genetics in October 2012. He finished the 2012–13 with 12.5 points, 4.2 rebounds and 2.4 assists in more than 27 minutes per game after playing in 23 games.

In the 2013 summer off-season, Knowles signed a contract to play for Ironi Nes Ziona in the Israeli Basketball Super League. In August 2014, his deal was extended for another season.

In July 2015, Knowles moved to Italian Lega Basket Serie A outfit Giorgio Tesi Group Pistoia, signing for the 2015–16 season.

The 2016–17 season, Knowles started with AEK Larnaca but left the club after appearing in two games. On December 18, 2016, he signed with Israeli club Maccabi Ashdod.

On August 25, 2017, Knowles signed with the Croatian team Zadar for the 2017–18 season. He averaged 14.5 points and 4.2 rebounds per game.

On July 17, 2018, Knowles signed with the Italian second division squad Derthona Basket. In January 2019, Knowles moved to another Serie A2 Basket club, Aurora Jesi.
