= Xiyue Wang =

Princeton University student detained by Iran

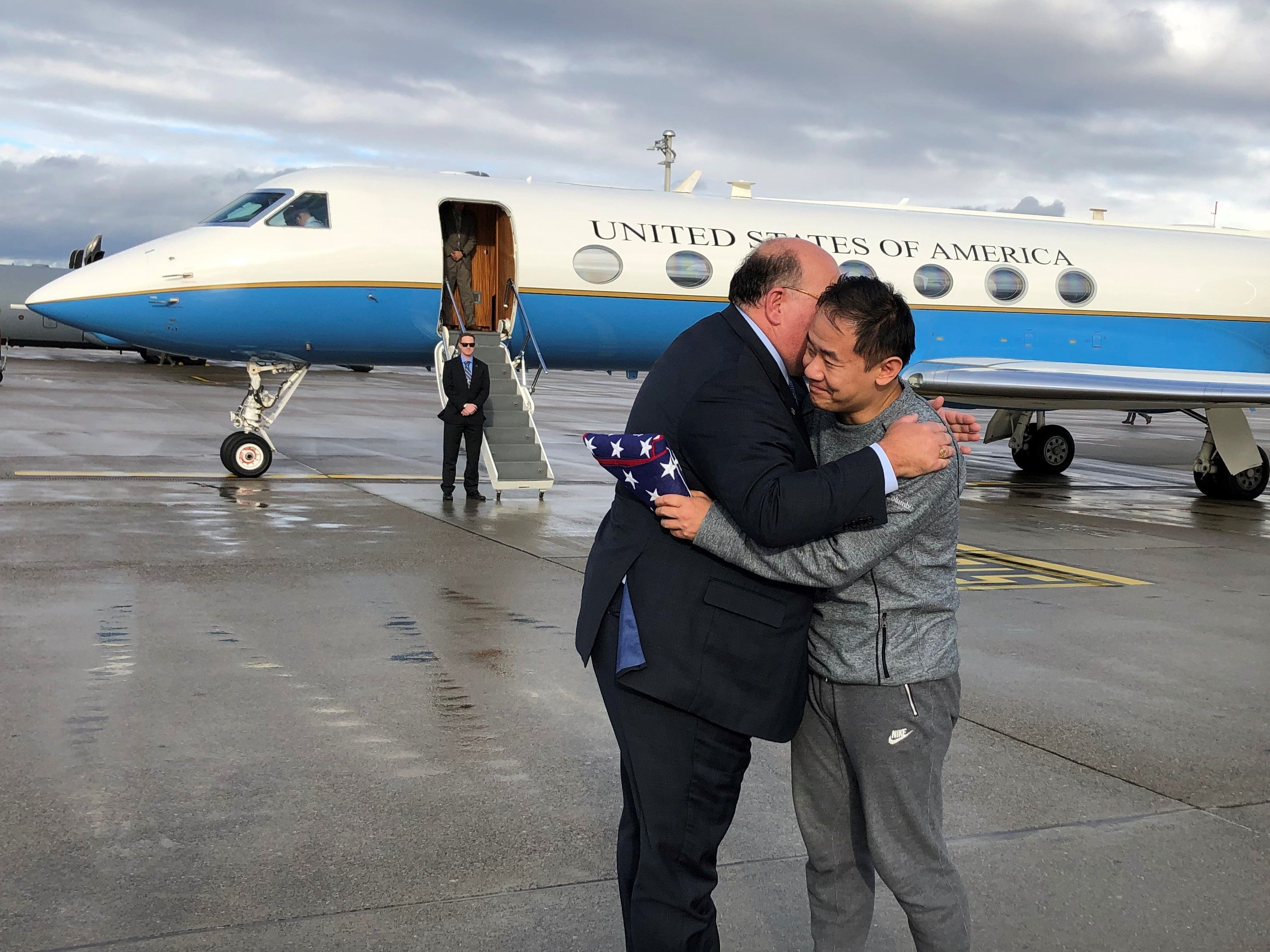
- Wang hugging United States Ambassador to Switzerland and Liechtenstein Ed McMullen in December 2019
- Born: December 31, 1980 (age 45); Beijing, China
- Citizenship: American
- Education: University of Washington; Harvard University; Princeton University

Xiyue Wang (Chinese: 王夕越; pinyin: Wáng Xīyuè; born December 31, 1980) is a Chinese-American academic who was imprisoned in Iran from 2016 to 2019 after being accused of espionage.

Iran released Wang in a prisoner swap between the two countries, with the U.S. freeing Iranian scientist Massoud Soleimani. U.S. law enforcement arrested the Iranian stem cell scientist in Fall 2018 upon his landing in Chicago for violating the sanctions against Iran. A PhD candidate in the Department of History at Princeton University, Wang was arrested in Iran on 8 August 2016 on charges of espionage while he was conducting research on the Qajar dynasty. It was alleged that he had sought access to confidential areas of Tehran libraries, paid thousands of dollars for access, and recorded 4,500 pages of digital documents.

In July 2017, he was sentenced to ten years in prison by Iran. In response to the sentencing, the United States Department of State released a press statement saying "The Iranian regime continues to detain US citizens and other foreigners on fabricated national-security related charges."

In January 2021, Wang joined the American Enterprise Institute as a Jeane Kirkpatrick Fellow.

== Early life ==
Wang was born on December 31, 1980, in Beijing, China. He earned a BA in South Asian studies from the University of Washington, attended Harvard University from 2006 to 2008, then later worked for the International Committee of the Red Cross in Afghanistan. At Princeton, his thesis adviser was historian Stephen Kotkin.

== Detention in Iran ==
In 2015, Iran gave Wang a visa to study Persian at an institute in northern Tehran. His goal was to do archival research during the trip, for a possible dissertation on nomads on Iran's Turkmen frontier more than 100 years ago. Wang received $8,500 from Princeton's history department to go to Iran, as well as no more than $8,800 from the Mossavar-Rahmani Center for Iran and Persian Gulf Studies.

Wang disappeared in August 2016. His wife Hua Qu was notified of his detainment by a local Iranian lawyer.

He was held in Evin Prison. While in prison, Wang faced harsh conditions and did not even have room to straighten his back.

According to Wang's wife, he was not warned that American citizens should not travel to Iran.

In an interview with BBC Persian after he was released, Wang described his captors as having been explicit about their intent, frankly telling him that he is taken "hostage" to be used for a prisoner swap and to force the US government to release seized Iranian assets. In an article published in The Atlantic, Wang considers his forty months of prison in Iran as a time to revise his opinion of the Iranian government; he came to believe that Iran's current situation is not “all because of something we did wrong to them”.

“I slowly saw: They don’t want to be our friends. They don’t want to reconcile. They say it clearly [in state propaganda]. They want us as an enemy, because that is the reason for their existence.”

In December 2019, it was announced that Wang would be released in a prisoner swap after three years in prison.

== Free Xiyue Wang movement ==
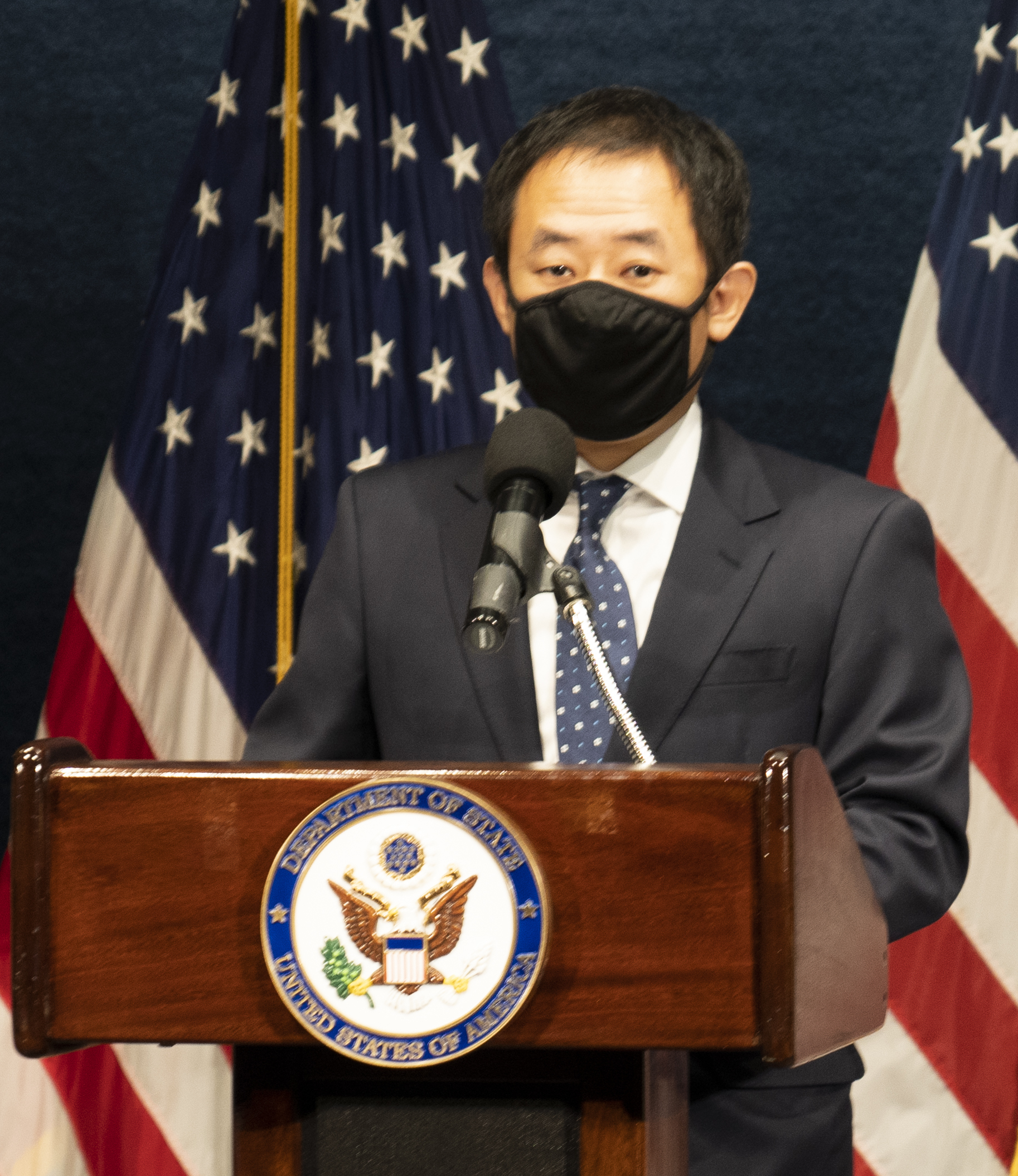
Wang speaks at the National Press Club in 2021.

In July 2017, the American Council on Education and 31 other higher education and research associations issued a statement calling for Wang's release. More than 1,000 researchers from 25 countries signed a petition also calling for his safe return.

On September 21, 2018, the United Nations Working Group on Arbitrary Detention found that "there was no legal basis for the arrest and detention of Mr. Wang. His deprivation of liberty is arbitrary."

On February 15, 2019, Princeton students held a Free Xiyue Wang Day event.

On December 7, 2019, Iran announced the release of Wang in exchange for an Iranian scientist, Masoud Soleimani, held by the United States.

== Post-prison Activities ==
Since his return to the United States, Wang has been vocal in his criticism of the Iranian regime and the regime's appeasement by the Biden administration and progressive academics. After his return to Princeton, Wang has described Iran-friendly academics, including those who encouraged him to go to Iran, unsympathetic with some of them blaming the ordeal on Trump's administration despite the fact that Wang was arrested three months before Trump was elected. Xiyue Wang supports the investigation of Mohammad Jafar Mahallati, a professor at Oberlin College in OH, who has been recently accused of allegedly hiding information about the 1988 massacreof political prisoners in Iran.

Regarding the January 2021 appointment of Robert Malley as special Iran envoy, Wang believes releasing American prisoners in Iran will not be a priority of Malley. In a Wall Street Journal piece, Wang rejected the view that attributes Iran's hostility towards the U.S. to the 1953 Iranian coup d'état, arguing that the Iranian regime's hostility is "self-perpetuated", "proactive", "integral to the regime’s identity" and "rooted in a fierce anti-Americanism enmeshed in its anti-imperialist ideology", as he witnessed firsthand during his time in Iran.

Wang has advocated the maximum pressure policy and show of strength as leverages without which diplomacy with Iran and trying to re-enter JCPOA would fail.

== Personal life ==
Wang is married to Hua Qu (Chinese: 曲桦; pinyin: Qū Huà), and they have a son born in 2013. His wife and son are Chinese citizens, but a spokesperson of the Chinese Foreign Ministry has stated that Wang himself does not hold Chinese citizenship.

Wang's mother has American citizenship. In 2001 he moved to the US with her. He became a naturalized citizen in 2009.

== See also ==
- List of foreign nationals detained in Iran
