= Petrochimi Bandar Imam BC =

Petrochimi Bandar Imam
- Leagues: Iranian Super League
- Founded: 2002; 24 years ago
- Arena: Andisheh Arena
- Location: Mahshahr, Iran
- President: Amin Moavi
- Head coach: Farzad Kouhian
- Championships: 1 FIBA Asian Cup; 2 West Asian Cup; 4 Iranian Championships
- Website: –
Home	Away

Petrochimi Bandar Imam Basketball Club (Persian: تیم بسكتبال پتروشیمی بندر امام, Tim-e Beskâtbal-e Petrushimi-ye Bendâr Eman), also known as shortly Petrochimi, is an Iranian professional basketball club based in Mahshahr, Iran. They compete in the Iranian Basketball Super League. In 2012 they became the first club in Iran to establish a basketball youth academy.

== History ==
In 2013, under the guidance of Doctor Mehran Hatami, Petro won the Iranian Basketball Super League for the first time in their history after defeating Mahram Tehran in the final. In 2014, Petro went undefeated throughout the season and again faced Mahram Tehran in the final and again won the league. After signing former NBA player Hamed Haddadi in 2016, Petrochimi won its fourth league title after defeating Naft Abadan in the final. In the same year, Petro finished in third place in the 2016 FIBA Asia Champions Cup.

In 2018, Petrochimi won the FIBA Asia Champions Cup and was crowned champions of Asia. The team beat Alvark Tokyo 68–64 in the final, behind 28 points by Meisam Mirzaei.

== Honours ==
=== Domestic competitions ===
- Iranian Super League

Champions (4): 2012–13, 2013–14, 2015–16, 2016–17

=== International competitions ===
- FIBA Asia Champions Cup

Champions (1): 2018
Third place (1): 2016

- WABA Champions Cup

Winners (2): 2016, 2018
Runners-up (3): 2014, 2017, 2019

== Roster ==
Note: Flags indicate national team eligibility at FIBA-sanctioned events. Players may hold other non-FIBA nationalities not displayed.

Number	Player	Position	Height (m)
8	(Iran) Behnam Yakhchali	SG	1.92
88	(Iran) Ashkan Khalilinejad	SF	1.93
30	(Iran) Navid Rezaeifar	SG	1.94
7	(Iran) Farid Aslani	PG	1.83
5	(Iran) Pouya Yakhchali	SG	1.85
7	(Iran) Sajjad Mashayekhi	PG	1.80
14	(Iran) Arsalan Kazemi	PF	2.01
12	(Iran) Asghar Kardoust	C	2.12
11	(Iran) Mehdi Helichi	SF	1.93
23	(Iran) Sajjad Pazirofteh	PF	2.01
21	(Iran) Rouzbeh Arghavan	C	2.14
04	(Iran) Meisam Mirzaei	C	2.08
20	(Iran) Mohammad Hossein Zakeri	SG	1.85
41	(Croatia) Joseph mikulic	SG	1.93
01	(Iran) Adnan Shaverdi	SF	1.88

Position	Name
Head coach	(Iran) Mehran Hatami
Assistant coach	(Iran) Khezeyer Shaverdi
Assistant coach	(Iran) Gholam Hossein Mahmoodian
Strength & Conditioning Coach	(Iran) Mehrad Ghadirzadeh
Director	(Iran) Amin Moavi

== Notable former players ==
- (Iran) Amir Amini
- (Iran) Hamed Hosseinzadeh
- (Iran) Saeid Davarpanah
- (Iran) Ali Doraghi
- (Iran) Hamed Haddadi
- (Iran) Samad Nikkhah Bahrami
- (Iran) Saman Veisi
- (Armenia) Rouben Vesmadian
- (Nigeria) Ekene Ibekwe
- (Nigeria) Ejike Ugboaja
- (Panama) Jaime Lloreda
- (United States) Jimmy Baxter
- (United States) Torraye Braggs
- (United States) Jason Crowe
- (United States) Ed Elisma
- (United States) Joseph Forte
- (United States) Jonathan Gibson
- (United States) C. J. Giles
- (United States) Julius Hodge
- (United States) Mark Karcher
- (United States) Art Long
- (United States) Tony Madison
- (United States) Smush Parker
- (United States) Alvin Sims
- (United States) K'zell Wesson
- (United States) Robert Whaley
