= Rouzbeh Arghavan =

Iranian basketball player (born 1988)

No. 12 – Shahrdari Gorgan
- Position: Center
- League: IBSL

Personal information
- Born: 18 May 1988 (age 38) Mashhad, Iran
- Listed height: 7 ft 0 in (2.13 m)
- Listed weight: 255 lb (116 kg)

Career information
- Playing career: 2009–present

Career history
- 2009: Saba Mehr Qazvin BC
- 2010–2011: Azad University Tehran BC
- 2012: Petrochimi Bandar Imam BC
- 2013: Zob Ahan Isfahan BC
- 2014: Azad University Tehran BC
- 2015: Azad University Tehran BC
- 2016: Petrochimi Bandar Imam
- 2017: Tabriz Municipality
- 2018: Petrochimi Bandar Imam
- 2019–2020: Shahrdari Gorgan BC
- 2021: Chemidor Tehran BC
- 2022–present: Shahrdari Gorgan BC
Medals
Men's basketball
Representing Iran
Asian Games
| Silver medal – second place | 2014 Incheon | Team |
| Silver medal – second place | 2018 Jakarta | Team |
Asian Championship
| Gold medal – first place | 2013 Manila |
| Silver medal – second place | 2017 Beirut |
Asian Cup
| Gold medal – first place | 2012 Tokyo |
| Gold medal – first place | 2016 Tehran |

Rouzbeh Arghavan (Persian: روزبه ارغوان), born 18 May 1988) is a professional Iranian basketball player who currently plays for Shahrdari Gorgan BC, and the Iranian national team. He plays at the center position, and is the second tallest player of Iran's national basketball team.

In 2004, when Arghavan entered the Iranian U-18 national team, according to experts he showed an amazing combination of strength and speed, making him a key role-player at the 4 and 5 positions. In addition to excellent attacking skills, he also displayed top defensive player skills, by playing defense well, and grabbing the most rebounds in his age group. He has also played for the senior national team, gaining experience in the 2014 World Cup and 2014 Incheon Asian Games.

Before picking up basketball, Arghavan was a skilled swimmer, who turned to basketball because of his large physique. In his personal life, he completed his bachelor's and master's degrees from applied physiology at Tehran University.
