= Danny Fenster =

American journalist

- Born: c. 1984 (age 41–42); United States
- Education: Columbia College Chicago; Wayne State University
- Occupation: Journalist
- Employer: Frontier Myanmar
- Spouse: Juliana Silva

Danny Fenster (born c. 1984) is an American journalist. He was the managing editor of Frontier Myanmar, a local news magazine. In the aftermath of the 2021 Myanmar coup d'état, Fenster became the only foreign journalist to be charged by military authorities, and was sentenced to 11 years in prison for sedition and related charges shortly before he was released in November 2021. The National Press Club awarded Fenster with the 2021 John Aubuchon Press Freedom Award during his detention.

== Early life ==
Fenster was born c. 1984 to Buddy and Rose Fenster. Fenster grew up in Huntington Woods, a suburb of Detroit, Michigan. He attended Burton Elementary School, Norup Middle School, and Berkley High School, and pursued undergraduate studies at Columbia College Chicago; he received a master's degree in creative writing from Wayne State University.

== Career ==
Before relocating to Asia in 2018, Fenster worked for news outlets in Detroit and Louisiana. Fenster previously worked as a reporter and copy editor for Myanmar Now from mid-2019 until July 2020, and joined Frontier Myanmar in August 2020.

=== Detention in Myanmar ===
In February 2021, the Burmese military staged a coup d'état and quickly curtailed press freedoms. The publishing licence of his former employer, Myanmar Now, was revoked in early March, but the outlet continued to report clandestinely. Fenster was detained by authorities on 24 May 2021 at Yangon International Airport, while waiting to board a flight to visit his family in Detroit. Fenster has been detained at notorious Insein Prison.

Fenster was charged for incitement, also known as sedition, for allegedly spreading false or inflammatory information, under Section 17(1) of the colonial-era Unlawful Associations Act, in connection with his work at Myanmar Now. In October 2021, authorities charged Fenster of violating Section 17(1) of the Unlawful Associations Act. Criminal proceedings have been shielded from the public and press. These colonial-era laws have previously been used to prosecute political activists and journalists reporting on opposition groups. On 3 November, the Burmese court rejected Fenster's bail application and authorities levied a new charge against him, of violating immigration law.

On November 12, the Myanmar military court sentenced Fenster to 11 years in jail. A few days later on November 15, Fenster was released from jail back to his family in the United States. His release was "secured following a private humanitarian visit by former UN ambassador and New Mexico governor Bill Richardson to Myanmar and face-to-face negotiations with General Min Aung Hlaing", the commander in chief of Myanmar's military.

== Personal life ==
Fenster is married to Juliana Silva. He has one elder brother. Fenster is of Jewish background.
