= Masoud Soleimani =

Iranian hematologist

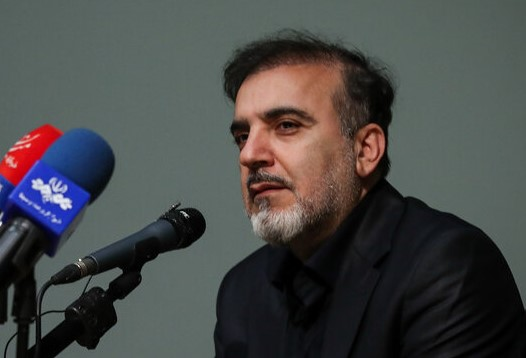
- Soleimani in 2019
- Born: 31 August 1970 (age 56); Isfahan, Iran
- Spouse: Mahnaz Rabeie
- Awards: National Razi award 2011 & 2020

Academic background
- Education: University of Tehran; Tarbiat Modares University
- Theses: Comparison of MTT Assay and Dye Exclusion Assay for Evaluation of Cytotoxic Effects of Drugs on Leukemia Cell Line (K562) (1998); Expansion of Human Cord Blood Hematopoietic Stem Cells and Investigation of Hemoglobin Switchig and Expression of CD44 Haplotype Molecule in Co-culture with Liver and Bone Marrow Stromal Cells (2005)
- Doctoral advisor: Hossein Mozdarani
- Other advisor: Ali Akbar Pourfathollah

Academic work
- Discipline: Hematology
- Institutions: Tarbiat Modares University
- Main interests: Stem-cell therapy; Tissue engineering
- Website: https://www.modares.ac.ir/~soleim_m

Masoud Soleimani (Persian: مسعود سلیمانی; born 31 August 1970) is an Iranian medical professor. Soleimani was invited by the Mayo Clinic in Minnesota to lead a research program; upon his arrival in the United States, he was arrested and transferred to a prison in Atlanta. He was imprisoned in the United States on October 25, 2018, pending trial, and was released in December 2019 in a prisoner swap for Xiyue Wang. Following the prisoner swap, charges were then dismissed.

== Detention in the United States ==
Soleimani traveled to the US in autumn 2018, where he planned to complete the final stage of his research on treating stroke patients as a visiting scholar at the prestigious Mayo Clinic in Minnesota.

He was arrested upon landing in Chicago. Prosecutors in Atlanta accused him and two of his former students of conspiring and attempting to export human growth factors from the US to Iran without authorization.

According to court documents, Soleimani's former student Mahboobe Ghaedi bought growth factors on his behalf in early 2016. At the time, Ghaedi was a researcher in laboratory medicine at Yale School of Medicine in New Haven, Connecticut. Now a principal scientist at the pharmaceutical firm AstraZeneca in Gaithersburg, Maryland, Ghaedi told Nature that she purchased the proteins in part because they are cheaper and more readily available in the United States than in Iran.

Ghaedi then sent the vials to another former student of Soleimani's, Maryam Jazayeri, a biochemist in Louisville, Kentucky. Jazayeri had agreed to take the growth factors to Soleimani during her next trip to visit family in Iran. But when she tried to board her plane at the Atlanta airport in September 2016, US border agents searched her luggage and confiscated the growth factors.

Jazayeri had no further contact with US law-enforcement officials until February 2018, when she was again stopped by border agents at the Atlanta airport. They asked her about the vials they had confiscated in 2016, and Jazayeri said that she had agreed to transport the growth factors to Soleimani as a favor, without knowing that this was prohibited. According to court documents, she also told the agents that the proteins were to be used for "medical purposes such as stem cell research, cancer research, and transplantation".

Eight months later, on 24 October 2018, a federal grand jury indicted all three scientists under seal — or behind closed doors — on two counts of conspiring to export goods to Iran without authorization. At the time, Soleimani was en route to the United States to take up a temporary research position at the Mayo Clinic in Rochester, Minnesota. Federal agents arrested him when he arrived in the United States on 25 October, and the government also revoked his visa. Ghaedi, a US permanent resident, and Jazayeri, a US citizen who was born in Iran, were arrested soon afterwards.

The attorneys for Jazayeri filed a motion to dismiss the charges, arguing that the Iranian sanctions were unconstitutionally vague as applied to the growth factors Jazayeri had in her possession and that, regardless, the growth factors were exempted from the export ban because they had a medicinal purpose.

On December 8, 2019, president Donald Trump thanked Tehran for "a very fair negotiation" and said: "See, we can make a deal together!". The charges against Jazayeri and Ghaedi were subsequently dropped.
