= Hamyari Shahrdari Zanjan BC =

- Leagues: Iranian Super League
- Arena: Enghelab Arena of Zanjan (Capacity: 6,000)
- Location: Zanjan, Iran
- Team colors: White and Red
- President: Mohammad Mehdi Ahmadian
- Head coach: (Iran) Farzad Kohian
- Website: –
Home	Away

Hamyari Shahrdari Zanjan BC (Persian: تیم بسكتبال همیاری شهرداری زنجان) is an Iranian professional basketball club based in Zanjan, Iran. They compete in the Iranian Basketball Super League. In the 2012–13 Iranian Basketball Super League season they finished fourth in standings.
