= Hamed Hosseinzadeh =

Iranian basketball player

No. 6 – Chemidor Tehran BC
- Position: Point guard
- League: IBSL

Personal information
- Born: January 22, 1987 (age 39)
- Listed height: 6 ft 1 in (1.85 m)
- Listed weight: 170 lb (77 kg)

Career information
- NBA draft: 2009: undrafted
- Playing career: 2009–present

Career history
- 2009–2012: Shahrdari Gorgan
- 2012–2015: Azad University
- 2015–2017: Petrochimi Bandar Imam
- 2017–2018: Mahram Tehran BC
- 2018–2019: Chemidor Tehran BC
- 2019–2020: Petrochimi Bandar Imam
- 2020–2021: Mahram Tehran BC
- 2021–present: Chemidor Tehran BC

Hamed Hosseinzadeh (born 22 January 1987) is an Iranian professional basketball player for Chemidor Qom in the Iranian Super League as well as for the Iranian national basketball team.

== Professional career ==
Hosseinzadeh played the 2016–17 season with the Petrochimi Bandar Imam, he averaged 4.74 points, 1.77 rebounds and 1.89 assists. He played the 2017–18 season at the Mahram Tehran BC, he averaged 11.82 points, 3.68 rebounds and 3.59 assists. He moved to Chemidor Tehran BC in the 2018–19 season, he played in the 2019 FIBA Asia Champions Cup, where he averaged 12.3 points, 4 rebounds and 4.3 assists He moved to Petrochimi Bandar Imam for the 2019 season.

== National team career ==
Hosseinzadeh represented the Iranian national basketball team at the 2019 FIBA Basketball World Cup in China.
