= Sanaye Petrochimi Mahshahr BC =

Sanaye Petrochimi Mahshahr
- Leagues: Iranian Super League
- Location: Mahshahr, Iran
- Team colors: Yellow and Blue
- Website: –
Home	Away

Sanaye Petrochimi Mahshahr is an Iranian professional basketball club based in Mahshahr, Iran. They compete in the Iranian Basketball Super League.
