= Foolad Mahan Isfahan BC =

Foolad Mahan Isfahan
- Leagues: Iranian Super League
- Founded: 2007
- Location: Isfahan, Iran
- Team colors: White and Blue
- Championships: 1 FIBA Asia Champions Cup
Home	Away

Foolad Mahan Isfahan Basketball Club (Persian: باشگاه بسکتبال فولاد ماهان سپاهان اصفهان, Bashgah-e Beskâtbal-e Fulâd Mahan Sipahan Esfehan) was an Iranian professional basketball club based in Esfahan, Iran. They compete in the Iranian Basketball Super League.

== Achievements ==
- FIBA Asia Champions Cup

Winners (1) : 2013
