= Brunei men's national basketball team =

Brunei
- FIBA ranking: NR (13 July 2026)
- Joined FIBA: 1970
- FIBA zone: FIBA Asia
- National federation: Brunei Basketball Association

FIBA World Cup
- Appearances: None
- Medals: None

FIBA Asia Cup
- Appearances: None
- Medals: None
Home	Away

The Brunei national basketball team represents Brunei in international basketball competitions and is managed by the Brunei Basketball Association (BBA).

== Competitions ==
=== FIBA Asia Cup ===
Year	Position	Pld	W	L
(Philippines) 1960	Not a FIBA member			
(Taiwan) 1963	Not a FIBA member			
(Malaysia) 1965	Not a FIBA member			
(South Korea) 1967	Not a FIBA member			
(Thailand) 1969	Not a FIBA member			
(Japan) 1971	Did not enter			
(Philippines) 1973	Did not enter			
(Thailand) 1975	Did not enter			
(Malaysia) 1977	Did not enter			
(Japan) 1979	Did not enter			
(India) 1981	Did not enter			
(Hong Kong) 1983	Did not enter			
(Malaysia) 1985	Did not enter			
(Thailand) 1987	Did not enter			
(China) 1989	Did not enter			
(Japan) 1991	Did not enter			
(Indonesia) 1993	Did not enter			
(South Korea) 1995	Did not enter			
(Saudi Arabia) 1997	Did not enter			
(Japan) 1999	Did not qualify			
(China) 2001	Did not qualify			
(China) 2003	Did not enter			
(Qatar) 2005	Did not enter			
(Japan) 2007	Did not enter			
(China) 2009	Did not enter			
(China) 2011	Did not enter			
(Philippines) 2013	Did not enter			
(China) 2015	Did not qualify			
(Lebanon) 2017	Did not enter			
(Indonesia) 2022	Did not qualify			
(Saudi Arabia) 2025	Did not enter			
2029	Did not enter			
Total	0/32	0	0	0

== Current roster ==
Roster at the FIBA Asia Cup 2021 SEABA Pre-Qualifier.

Brunei National Basketball Team roster
Players
Coaches

Pos.	No.	Name	Age – Date of birth	Height	Club	Ctr.
G	0	Ahmad Termizi bin Noordeen	30 – 15 December 1987	1.75 m (5 ft 9 in)		(Brunei)
G	5	Ching Poh Chong	35 – 20 November 1982	1.70 m (5 ft 7 in)		(Brunei)
G	7	Chin Kai Khoo	26 – 30 September 1991	1.73 m (5 ft 8 in)		(Brunei)
F	8	Ye Wei Tan	36 – 5 February 1982	1.83 m (6 ft 0 in)		(Brunei)
F	11	Benjamin Norman Sim	33 – 11 April 1985	1.83 m (6 ft 0 in)		(Brunei)
C	14	Muhammad Zainul Ashyraf bin Hussin	30 – 28 October 1987	1.96 m (6 ft 5 in)		(Brunei)
F	15	Jen Hao Onn	27 – 26 July 1990	1.80 m (5 ft 11 in)		(Brunei)
G	23	Kah Hou Chong	19 – 11 May 1999	1.83 m (6 ft 0 in)		(Brunei)
F	24	Ming Kwong Han	27 – 26 March 1991	1.83 m (6 ft 0 in)		(Brunei)
G	33	Chew Siong Gideon Fong	22 – 12 July 1995	1.75 m (5 ft 9 in)		(Brunei)
F	36	Chee Choun Lim	36 – 26 April 1982	1.83 m (6 ft 0 in)		(Brunei)
F	99	Kian Leong Soon	27 – 22 April 1991	1.83 m (6 ft 0 in)		(Brunei)

Head coach

 *   

Legend

- (C) Team captain
- Club field describes current pro club

== Coaches ==
- (Philippines) Bennett Palad (2003–2008)
- (United States) Kevin Reece (2010–2014)
- (Philippines) Nomar Angeles Isla (2014–)

== Honors ==
=== Regional ===
- Borneo Cup
  - Champions: 2011
  - Silver medalists: 2012

=== Others ===
- Mum's Bakery Cup (Sultan's Cup)
  - Champions: 2011, 2012
