= Bahrain men's national basketball team =

Men's national basketball team representing Bahrain

Bahrain
- FIBA ranking: 77 ▲3 (1 September 2026)
- Joined FIBA: 1975
- FIBA zone: FIBA Asia
- National federation: Bahrain Basketball Association
- Coach: Slobodan Subotić

Olympic Games
- Appearances: None

FIBA World Cup
- Appearances: None

FIBA Asia Cup
- Appearances: 9
- Medals: None
Home	Away

The Bahrain national basketball team, represents Bahrain in international basketball competitions and is controlled by the Bahrain Basketball Association. (Arabic: جمعية البحرين لكرة السلة)

== FIBA Asia Championship ==
=== Performance ===
- best performance : 10th
- worst performance: 1991 : 15th

Bahrain last played at the FIBA Asia Championship in 1999, where they finished 12th with a 2–5 record and victories over Malaysia and Hong Kong.

Bahrain qualified for the FIBA Asia Championship 2009 in Tianjin, China by finishing fourth at the 2009 Gulf Cup. However, they withdrew before the tournament, opening up a spot for Chinese Taipei to compete in the tournament.

=== FIBA Asia Champions Cup ===
In 2000, Bahrain club Al-Manama finished third in the FIBA Asia Champions Cup, the only time that a Bahrain club medaled at the championship.

== Competitions ==
=== FIBA Asia Cup ===
Year	Position	Pld	W	L
(Philippines) 1960	Not a FIBA member			
(Taiwan) 1963	Not a FIBA member			
(Malaysia) 1965	Not a FIBA member			
(South Korea) 1967	Not a FIBA member			
(Thailand) 1969	Not a FIBA member			
(Japan) 1971	Not a FIBA member			
(Philippines) 1973	Not a FIBA member			
(Thailand) 1975	Not a FIBA member			
(Malaysia) 1977	12th place	9	2	7
(Japan) 1979	12th place	8	1	7
(India) 1981	Did not enter			
(Hong Kong) 1983	Did not enter			
(Malaysia) 1985	Did not enter			
(Thailand) 1987	13th place	7	4	3
(China) 1989	Did not enter			
(Japan) 1991	15th place	8	4	4
(Indonesia) 1993	Did not enter			
(South Korea) 1995	Did not enter			
(Saudi Arabia) 1997	10th place	7	4	3
(Japan) 1999	12th place	7	2	5
(China) 2001	Did not enter			
(China) 2003	Did not qualify			
(Qatar) 2005	Did not qualify			
(Japan) 2007	Did not qualify			
(China) 2009	Withdrew			
(China) 2011	15th place	5	1	4
(Philippines) 2013	12th place	8	2	6
(China) 2015	Did not qualify			
(Lebanon) 2017	Did not qualify			
(Indonesia) 2022	13th place	3	0	3
(Saudi Arabia) 2025	Did not qualify			
2029	To be determined			
Total	9/31	62	20	42

=== William Jones Cup ===
- 1978 – Participated
- 2025 – third place

== Team ==
=== Current roster ===
==== 2021 FIBA Asia Cup qualification ====
Opposition: India (21 February)
Venue: Khalifa Sport City, Manama
Opposition: Lebanon (24 February)
Venue: Nouhad Nawfal Sports Complex, Zouk Mikael

Bahrain national basketball team – 2021 FIBA Asia Cup qualification roster
Players
Coaches

Pos.	No.	Name	Age – Date of birth	Height	Club	Ctr.
G	1	Mohamed Buallay	25 – 19 January 1995	1.90 m (6 ft 3 in)	Al-Muharraq BC	(Bahrain)
G	5	Mohamed Ebrahim	33 – 10 February 1987	1.85 m (6 ft 1 in)	Al-Manama BC	(Bahrain)
G	7	Maitham Isa	29 – 23 September 1990	1.83 m (6 ft 0 in)	Al-Manama BC	(Bahrain)
PF	10	Subah Azzam	26 – 6 December 1993	1.98 m (6 ft 6 in)	Al-Riffa BC	(Bahrain)
PF	11	Mohammed Abdulredha Ali	32 – 28 September 1987	1.88 m (6 ft 2 in)	Al-Manama BC	(Bahrain)
C	12	Ahmed Akber	28 – 22 February 1991	1.99 m (6 ft 6 in)	Al-Manama BC	(Bahrain)
C	15	Mohammed Khamis	28 – 29 January 1992	2.02 m (6 ft 8 in)	Al-Manama BC	(Bahrain)
C	21	C.J. Giles (NP)	34 – 23 September 1985	2.11 m (6 ft 11 in)	Al-Najma BC	(United States)
PF	23	Mohammed Hammooda	25 – 15 January 1995	1.98 m (6 ft 6 in)	Al-Manama BC	(Bahrain)
F	24	Muzamil Hammooda	18 – 20 January 2002	1.99 m (6 ft 6 in)	Al-Manama BC	(Bahrain)
G	54	Hesham Sarhan	27 – 24 August 1992	1.80 m (5 ft 11 in)	Al-Ahli BC	(Bahrain)
PG	55	Ahmed Al Derazi	29 – 9 October 1990	1.71 m (5 ft 7 in)	Al-Muharraq BC	(Bahrain)

Head coach

- (Lithuania) Mindaugas Lukošius

Assistant coach(es)

- (Bahrain) Ayoob Haji
- (Bahrain) Ayman Sadeeq

Legend

- (C) Team captain
- (NP) Naturalized player
- Club – describes last
  club before the tournament
- Age – describes age
  on 1 April 2022

=== Past roster ===
Bahrain Men's National Basketball Team: 2013 FIBA Asia Championship roster
Players
Coaches

Pos.	No.	Name	Age – Date of birth	Height	Club
	4	Mohamed Ebrahim	26 – 10 February 1987		Manama Club
G	5	Hussain Al-Tawash	26 – 4 July 1986	5 ft 9 in (1.75 m)	Al Ahli Sidab
	6	Mohammed Kawaid	23 – 14 November 1989		Athleta A-Z Electronics (Malta)
	7	Bader Abdulla Malabes	25 – 11 August 1987		Al-Muharraq SC
	8	Ahmed Ismaeel	22 – 19 October 1990		Manama Club
G/F	9	Mohamed Alderazi	32 – 27 July 1980	6 ft 5 in (1.96 m)	Al-Muharraq SC
	10	Abdul-Rahman Mubarak	24 – 24 October 1988		Bahrain
	11	Subah Azzam	19 – 6 December 1993		Bahrain
F/C	12	C.J. Giles	27 – 23 September 1985	6 ft 11 in (2.11 m)	Al-Muharraq SC
	13	Yunes Kawaid	24 – 27 May 1988		Bahrain
	14	Ahmed Akbar	25 – 28 September 1987		Manama Club
F	15	Ahmed Aman	41 – 7 March 1971	6 ft 2 in (1.88 m)	Al-Muharraq SC

Head coach

- (Serbia) Saša Nikitović
