= 1998 SEABA Championship =

3rd Southeast Asian Basketball Championship

Tournament details
- Host country: Philippines
- Dates: March 25–31
- Teams: 8
- Venue(s): 1 (in 1 host city)

Final positions
- Champions: Philippines (1st title)
- Runners-up: Thailand
- Third place: Malaysia
- Fourth place: Singapore

The 3rd Southeast Asia Basketball Association Championship is the qualifying tournament for the 1999 ABC Championship. the two best teams qualifies for the Asian championship. The tournament was held at Manila, Philippines. It was organized by the Basketball Association of the Philippines

== Teams ==
It was planned that all ten members of the SEABA would participate. Defending champions, Indonesia initially confirmed participation but did not take part. Eight teams accepted the invitation.

== Venue ==
The Ninoy Aquino Stadium within the Rizal Memorial Sports Complex served as the venue for the games.

Manila
Ninoy Aquino Stadium	1998 SEABA Championship (Metro Manila)
Capacity: 6,000	1998 SEABA Championship (Metro Manila)

== Preliminary round ==
=== Group A ===
Pos	Team	Pld	W	L	PF	PA	PD	Pts	Qualification
1	Philippines (H)	3	3	0	332	182	+150	6	Semifinals
2	Singapore	3	2	1	221	193	+28	5	Semifinals
3	Vietnam	3	1	2	199	225	−26	4	Fifth place play-off
4	Cambodia	3	0	3	150	302	−152	3	Seventh place play-off

Source: Manila Standard
(H) Hosts

March 25
15:30

Match details

Philippines	110–62	Vietnam

Ninoy Aquino Stadium, Manila

March 26

Singapore	67–54	Vietnam

Ninoy Aquino Stadium, Manila

March 26

Match details

Philippines	131–54	Cambodia

Ninoy Aquino Stadium, Manila

March 27

Match details

Singapore	88–48	Cambodia

Ninoy Aquino Stadium, Manila

March 28
15:30

Match details

Cambodia	48–83	Vietnam

Ninoy Aquino Stadium, Manila

March 28
17:30

Match details

Philippines	91–66	Singapore

Ninoy Aquino Stadium, Manila

=== Group B ===
Pos	Team	Pld	W	L	PD	Pts	Qualification
1	Thailand	3	3	0	0	6	Semifinals
2	Malaysia	3	2	1	0	5	Semifinals
3	Brunei	3	1	2	0	4	Fifth place play-off
4	Laos	3	0	3	0	3	Seventh place play-off

Source: Manila Standard

March 25
17:00

Match details

Laos	40–92	Malaysia

Ninoy Aquino Stadium, Manila

March 25
19:30

Thailand	W–L	Brunei

Ninoy Aquino Stadium, Manila

March 26

Match details

Thailand	73–57	Malaysia

Ninoy Aquino Stadium, Manila

March 27
15:30

Match details

Thailand	116–26	Laos

Ninoy Aquino Stadium, Manila

March 27
18:30

Brunei	L–W	Malaysia

Ninoy Aquino Stadium, Manila

March 28
17:00

Match details

Laos	53–82	Brunei

Ninoy Aquino Stadium, Manila

== Classification round ==
Fifth place game
March 30
Brunei	?
Vietnam	?
Seventh place game
March 30
Cambodia	69
Laos	67

=== Seventh place game ===
March 30
15:30

Match details

Cambodia	69–67	Laos

Ninoy Aquino Stadium, Manila

=== Fifth place game ===
March 31
15:30

Brunei	?–?	Vietnam

Ninoy Aquino Stadium, Manila

== Final round ==
Semifinals
March 30
Thailand	83
Singapore	41
March 30
Philippines	W
Malaysia	L

Gold medal game
March 31
Philippines	90
Thailand	69
Bronze medal game
March 31
Malaysia	W
Singapore	L

=== Semifinals ===
March 30
17:00

Match details

Thailand	83–41	Singapore

Ninoy Aquino Stadium, Manila

March 30
18:30

Philippines	W–L	Malaysia

Ninoy Aquino Stadium, Manila

=== Third place game ===
March 31
17:00

Singapore	L–W	Malaysia

Ninoy Aquino Stadium, Manila

=== Final ===
March 31
18:30

Match Results

Thailand	69–90	Philippines

Ninoy Aquino Stadium, Manila

== Final standings ==
Rank	Team	Qualification
Gold medal	Philippines	1999 ABC Championship
Silver medal	Thailand	1999 ABC Championship
Bronze medal	Malaysia	
4	Singapore	
5–6	Brunei; Vietnam	
7	Cambodia	
8	Laos	

== Awards ==
1998 Southeast Asian champions

Philippines
First title
