= 1972 ABC Under-18 Championship =

1972 FIBA U18 Asia Cup
2nd FIBA Under-18 Asian Basketball Championship

Tournament details
- Host country: Philippines
- Dates: December 10–20
- Teams: 7 (from all Asian federations)
- Venue(s): 1 (in 1 host city)

Final positions
- Champions: Philippines (2nd title)

The 1972 ABC Under-18 Championship was the second edition of the Asian Basketball Confederation (ABC)'s junior championship. The games were held at Manila, Philippines from December 10–December 20, 1972.

The Philippines were able to retain the championship by sweeping all of their assignments, blasting Taiwan, 95-62, in the final day.

== Preliminary round ==
| Team | Pld | W | L | Pts |
|---|---|---|---|---|
| Philippines | 6 | 6 | 0 | 12 |
| Taiwan | 6 | 5 | 1 | 11 |
| South Korea | 6 | 4 | 2 | 10 |
| India | 6 | 3 | 3 | 9 |
| Thailand | 6 | 2 | 4 | 8 |
| Malaysia | 6 | 1 | 5 | 7 |
| Singapore | 6 | 0 | 6 | 6 |

December 10

Report

| Malaysia | 65–108 | Taiwan |
Scoring by half: 33−53, 32−55

Rizal Memorial Coliseum, Manila

December 10

Report

| South Korea | 87–54 | Singapore |
Scoring by half: 45−25, 42−29

Rizal Memorial Coliseum, Manila

December 10

Report

| India | 30–117 | Philippines |
Scoring by half: 18−52, 12−65

Rizal Memorial Coliseum, Manila

December 11

Report1 Report2

| Philippines | 113–51 | Malaysia |
Scoring by half: 58-10, 55-32

Rizal Memorial Coliseum, Manila

December 11

Report1 Report2

| Taiwan | 95–85 | South Korea |
Scoring by half: 46-37, 49-48

Rizal Memorial Coliseum, Manila

December 11

Report1 Report2

| Thailand | 89–91 (OT) | India |
Scoring by half: 35-40, 44-39 Overtime: 10-12

Rizal Memorial Coliseum, Manila

December 12

Report

| South Korea | 106–56 | Thailand |
Scoring by half: 49−30, 57−26

Rizal Memorial Coliseum, Manila

December 12

Report

| Singapore | 57–93 | Taiwan |
Scoring by half: 24−55, 33−38

Rizal Memorial Coliseum, Manila

December 13

Report

| Malaysia | 51–136 | South Korea |
Scoring by half: 21−67, 30−69

Rizal Memorial Coliseum, Manila

December 13

Report

| Philippines | 121–72 | Thailand |
Scoring by half: 62−22, 59−50

Rizal Memorial Coliseum, Manila

December 13

Report

| India | 85–80 | Singapore |
Scoring by half: 38−31, 47−49

Rizal Memorial Coliseum, Manila

December 14

Report

| Singapore | 76–98 | Malaysia |
Scoring by half: 29−44, 47−54

Rizal Memorial Coliseum, Manila

December 14

Report

| Taiwan | 118–63 | India |
Scoring by half: 56−30, 62−33

Rizal Memorial Coliseum, Manila

December 15

Report

| Thailand | 76–71 | Malaysia |
Scoring by half: 36−43, 40−28

Rizal Memorial Coliseum, Manila

December 15

Report

| Philippines | 73–71 | Taiwan |
Scoring by half: 37−39, 36−32

Rizal Memorial Coliseum, Manila

December 15

Report

| India | 56–116 | South Korea |

Rizal Memorial Coliseum, Manila

December 16

Report

| Singapore | 48–116 | Philippines |
Scoring by half: 26−64, 22−52

Rizal Memorial Coliseum, Manila

December 16

Report1 Report2

| Malaysia | 66–69 | India |
Scoring by half: 28-30, 38-39

Rizal Memorial Coliseum, Manila

December 16

Report

| Taiwan | 108–82 | Thailand |
Scoring by half: 51-45, 57-37

Rizal Memorial Coliseum, Manila

December 17

Report

| Thailand | 104–67 | Singapore |
Scoring by half: 48-30, 56-37

Rizal Memorial Coliseum, Manila

December 17

Report

| South Korea | 76–79 | Philippines |
Scoring by half: 37-39, 39-40

Rizal Memorial Coliseum, Manila

== Final round ==
=== Classification 5th–7th ===
| Team | Pld | W | L | PF | PA | PD | Pts |
|---|---|---|---|---|---|---|---|
| Thailand | 2 | 2 | 0 | 166 | 139 | +27 | 4 |
| Singapore | 2 | 1 | 1 | 164 | 177 | −13 | 3 |
| Malaysia | 2 | 0 | 2 | 163 | 177 | −14 | 2 |

December 18

Report

| Malaysia | 89–99 | Singapore |
Scoring by half: 39−46, 50−53

Rizal Memorial Coliseum, Manila

December 19

Report1 Report2

| Singapore | 65–88 | Thailand |
Scoring by half: 32-49, 33-39

Rizal Memorial Coliseum, Manila

December 20

Report

| Thailand | 78–74 | Malaysia |
Scoring by half: 33−31, 45−43

Rizal Memorial Coliseum, Manila

=== Championship ===
| Team | Pld | W | L | Pts |
|---|---|---|---|---|
| Philippines | 3 | 3 | 0 | 6 |
| Taiwan | 3 | 2 | 1 | 5 |
| South Korea | 3 | 1 | 2 | 4 |
| India | 3 | 0 | 3 | 3 |

December 18

Report1 Report2

| Philippines | 82–70 | South Korea |
Scoring by half: 48-31, 34-39

Rizal Memorial Coliseum, Manila

December 18

Report1 Report2

| India | 70–88 | Taiwan |
Scoring by half: 31-48, 39-34

Rizal Memorial Coliseum, Manila

December 19

Report

| Philippines | 128–43 | India |
Scoring by half: 60-21, 68-22

Rizal Memorial Coliseum, Manila

December 19

Report

| South Korea | 82–84 | Taiwan |
Scoring by half: 40-47, 42-37

Rizal Memorial Coliseum, Manila

December 20

Report

| South Korea | 100–49 | India |
Scoring by half: 52−29, 48−20

Rizal Memorial Coliseum, Manila

December 20

Report

| Taiwan | 62–95 | Philippines |
Scoring by half: 36−47, 26−48

Rizal Memorial Coliseum, Manila

== Final standing ==
| Rank | Team | Record |
|---|---|---|
| 1st place, gold medalist(s) | Philippines | 9–0 |
| 2nd place, silver medalist(s) | Taiwan | 7–2 |
| 3rd place, bronze medalist(s) | South Korea | 5–4 |
| 4 | India | 3–6 |
| 5 | Thailand | 4–4 |
| 6 | Singapore | 1–7 |
| 7 | Malaysia | 1–7 |

== Awards ==
1972 Asian Under-18 champions

Philippines
Second title
