= Basketball at the 2025 SEA Games – Men's tournament =

Men's basketball tournament at the 2025 SEA Games
- Venue: 1
- Dates: 13–19 December 2025
- Competitors: 7 from 7 nations

Medalists
gold medal	Philippines
silver medal	Thailand
bronze medal	Indonesia

The men's basketball tournament at the 2025 SEA Games was held at the Nimibutr Stadium in Bangkok, Thailand from 13 to 19 December 2025.

Naturalized players as well as any other player who obtained the relevant passport after age 16 are not eligible to play. Cambodia pulled out of the 33rd SEA Games citing safety reasons.

== Participating nations ==
- Indonesia
- Malaysia
- Myanmar
- Philippines
- Singapore
- Thailand
- Vietnam

== Results ==
All times are Indochina Time (UTC+7)

=== Preliminary round ===
==== Group A ====
Pos	Team	Pld	W	L	PF	PA	PD	Pts	Qualification
1	Philippines	2	2	0	161	125	+36	4	Advance to Semi-finals
2	Malaysia	2	1	1	147	146	+1	3	Qualification to Quarter-finals
3	Vietnam	2	0	2	130	167	−37	2	Qualification to Quarter-finals

Source: Basketball - 5x5 Schedule & Results

13 December 2025
11:30

Results

Vietnam	63–89	Malaysia
Scoring by quarter: 21−19, 11−22, 15−23, 16−25

Nimibutr Stadium, Bangkok

14 December 2025
11:30

Results
Box Scores

Malaysia	58–83	Philippines
Scoring by quarter: 22−16, 4−26, 25−20, 7−21
Pts: Ting 21; Rebs: Lee S.W. 10; Asts: Yong 4		Pts: Parks 18; Rebs: Ravena 10; Asts: Ravena 10

Nimibutr Stadium, Bangkok
Attendance: 1000
Referees: Zhang Xiao (CHN), Ong Jin Leong (SGP), Nattapong Jontapa (THA)

15 December 2025
11:30

Results

Philippines	78–67	Vietnam
Scoring by quarter: 16−21, 21−20, 24−19, 17−7
Pts: Erram 15; Rebs: Malonzo, Parks 8 Asts: Bolick 4		Pts: Tran, H. Nguyen 19; Rebs: Dierker 15; Asts: Tran 4

Nimibutr Stadium, Bangkok
Attendance: 500
Referees: Yuen Chun Yip (HKG), Suebpong Wichaiphin (THA), Nattapong Jontapa (THA)

==== Group B ====
Pos	Team	Pld	W	L	PF	PA	PD	Pts	Qualification
1	Thailand (H)	3	3	0	288	142	+146	6	Advance to Semi-finals
2	Indonesia	3	2	1	268	154	+114	5	Qualification to Quarter-finals
3	Singapore	3	1	2	176	231	−55	4	Qualification to Quarter-finals
4	Myanmar	3	0	3	133	338	−205	3	

Source: Basketball - 5x5 Schedule & Results
(H) Hosts

13 December 2025
14:00

Results

Myanmar	35–114	Indonesia
Scoring by quarter: 14−28, 8−43, 5−22, 8−21

Nimibutr Stadium, Bangkok

13 December 2025
19:00

Results

Singapore	37–84	Thailand
Scoring by quarter: 11−22, 14−19, 5−24, 7−17

Nimibutr Stadium, Bangkok

14 December 2025
14:00

Results

Singapore	91–60	Myanmar
Scoring by quarter: 31−16, 24−13, 21−23, 15−8

Nimibutr Stadium, Bangkok

14 December 2025
19:00

Results

Thailand	71–67	Indonesia
Scoring by quarter: 22–18, 19–13, 13–17, 17–19

Nimibutr Stadium, Bangkok

15 December 2025
14:00

Results

Indonesia	87–48	Singapore
Scoring by quarter: 25−12, 25−17, 16−12, 21−7

Nimibutr Stadium, Bangkok

15 December 2025
19:00

Results

Thailand	133–38	Myanmar
Scoring by quarter: 33−8, 34−8, 52−5, 14−17

Nimibutr Stadium, Bangkok

=== Knockout round ===
Quarter-finals
A2	Malaysia	71
B3	Singapore	69
B2	Indonesia	89
A3	Vietnam	66

Semi-finals
B1	Thailand	86
A2	Malaysia	55
A1	Philippines	71
B2	Indonesia	68

Final
B1	Thailand	64
A1	Philippines	70
Third place
A2	Malaysia	68
B2	Indonesia	80

==== Quarter-finals ====
17 December 2025
16:30

Results

Singapore	69–71	Malaysia
Scoring by quarter: 13−21, 19−21, 17−15, 20−14

Nimibutr Stadium, Bangkok

17 December 2025
19:00

Results

Vietnam	66–89	Indonesia
Scoring by quarter: 19−24, 17−14, 22−25, 8−26

Nimibutr Stadium, Bangkok

==== Semi-finals ====
18 December 2025
14:00

Results

Philippines	71–68	Indonesia
Scoring by quarter: 15−27, 18−7, 21−12, 17−22

Nimibutr Stadium, Bangkok

18 December 2025
19:00

Results

Thailand	86–55	Malaysia
Scoring by quarter: 22−10, 24−17, 19−9, 21−19

Nimibutr Stadium, Bangkok

==== Fifth place game ====
19 December 2025
09:00

Results

Singapore	58–96	Vietnam
Scoring by quarter: 12–21, 21–24, 12–26, 13–25

Nimibutr Stadium, Bangkok

==== Bronze medal match ====
19 December 2025
14:00

Results

Indonesia	80–68	Malaysia
Scoring by quarter: 18–17, 25–15, 22–12, 15–24

Nimibutr Stadium, Bangkok

==== Gold medal match ====
19 December 2025
19:00

Results

Philippines	70–64	Thailand
Scoring by quarter: 17−22, 12−16, 23−10, 18−16

Nimibutr Stadium, Bangkok

== Final standings ==
Rank	Team
1st place, gold medalist(s)	Philippines
2nd place, silver medalist(s)	Thailand
3rd place, bronze medalist(s)	Indonesia
4	Malaysia
5	Vietnam
6	Singapore
7	Myanmar

== See also ==
- Women's tournament
