= Basketball at the Islamic Games =

1980 Basketball Tournament of Islamic Games
Tournament details
- Host country: Turkey
- City: İzmir
- Dates: 29 September – 3 October
- Teams: 6 (from 3 confederations)
- Venue(s): 1 (in 1 host city)

Final positions
- Champions: Turkey (1st title)
- Runners-up: Algeria
- Third place: Malaysia
- Fourth place: Pakistan

Tournament statistics
- Games played: 15
- Top scorer: (Turkey) Efe Aydan (108 points)

The Basketball Tournament at the Islamic Games was held in the İzmir Atatürk Sports Hall from September 29 to October 3, 1980, in İzmir, Turkey.

== Men's competition ==
- 29 September 1980

Turkey	142 – 45	Libya
Malaysia	83 – 74	Saudi Arabia
Pakistan	72 – 73 (OT)	Algeria

- 30 September 1980

Libya	58 – 83	Pakistan
Algeria	84 – 69	Malaysia
Turkey	105 – 53	Saudi Arabia

- 1 October 1980

Libya	77 – 111	Malaysia
Turkey	111 – 66	Pakistan
Saudi Arabia	68 – 87	Algeria

- 2 October 1980

Pakistan	80 – 89	Malaysia
Saudi Arabia	93 – 79	Libya
Turkey	81 – 38	Algeria

- 3 October 1980

Saudi Arabia	69 – 82	Pakistan
Algeria	81 – 54	Libya
Turkey	100 – 59	Malaysia

== Final ranking ==
Rank	Team
Gold medal	Turkey
Silver medal	Algeria
Bronze medal	Malaysia
4.	Pakistan
5.	Saudi Arabia
6.	Libya

== Winners ==
Basketball tournament winners

Turkey
