= 2013 SEABA Championship =

10th Southeast Asian Basketball Championship

Tournament details
- Host country: Indonesia
- Dates: June 20–23
- Teams: 4
- Venue(s): 1 (in 1 host city)

Final positions
- Champions: Thailand (1st title)

The 10th Southeast Asia Basketball Association Championship was the qualifying tournament for the 2013 FIBA Asia Championship; it also served as a regional championship involving Southeast Asian basketball teams. It was held on June 20 to June 23, 2013 at Medan, Indonesia. The two best teams qualified for the 2013 FIBA Asia Championship.

== Preliminary round ==
Team	Pld	W	L	PF	PA	PD	Pts	Tiebreaker
Thailand	3	2	1	218	185	+33	5	1–0
Malaysia	3	2	1	178	185	−7	5	0–1
Singapore	3	1	2	181	195	−14	4	1–0
Indonesia	3	1	2	217	229	−12	4	0–1

June 20
17:00

Singapore	49–67	Thailand
Scoring by quarter: 16–17, 7–14, 17–22, 9–14

GOR Samudra, Medan

June 20
19:00

Indonesia	64–67	Malaysia
Scoring by quarter: 23–21, 12–15, 16–20, 13–11

GOR Samudra, Medan

June 21
18:00

Malaysia	64–58	Singapore
Scoring by quarter: 22–19, 12–13, 15–10, 15–16

GOR Samudra, Medan

June 21
20:00

Thailand	88–89 (OT)	Indonesia
Scoring by quarter: 18–22, 17–16, 17–20, 27–21, Overtime: 9–10

GOR Samudra, Medan

June 22
18:00

Malaysia	47–63	Thailand
Scoring by quarter: 10–18, 8–24, 18–13, 11–8

GOR Samudra, Medan

June 22
20:00

Indonesia	64–74	Singapore
Scoring by quarter: 21–24, 13–27, 20–8, 10–15

GOR Samudra, Medan

== Final ==
June 23
20:00

Thailand	73–63	Malaysia
Scoring by quarter: 18–24, 17–10, 22–17, 16–12

GOR Samudra, Medan

== Awards ==
2013 Southeast Asian champions

Thailand
First title

== Final standings ==
	Qualified for the 2013 FIBA Asia Championship
Rank	Team
Gold medal	Thailand
Silver medal	Malaysia
Bronze medal	Singapore
4th	Indonesia
