= Pakistan men's national under-18 basketball team =

Pakistan
- FIBA zone: FIBA Asia
- National federation: Pakistan Basketball Federation

U19 World Cup
- Appearances: None

U18 Asia Cup
- Appearances: 3 (1977, 1989, 1998)
- Medals: None

The Pakistan men's national under-18 basketball team is a national basketball team of Pakistan, administered by the Pakistan Basketball Federation. It represents the country in international under-18 men's basketball competitions.

== FIBA Under-18 Asia Cup participations ==
Year	Result
1977	10th
1989	13th
1998	14th

== See also ==
- Pakistan men's national basketball team
- Pakistan men's national 3x3 team
