= Pakistan men's national 3x3 team =

National 3x3 basketball team

Pakistan
- FIBA ranking: 141
- FIBA zone: FIBA Asia
- National federation: Pakistan Basketball Federation

World Championships
- Appearances: None
Home	Away

The Pakistan men's national 3x3 team represents Pakistan in international 3x3 basketball matches and is controlled by the Pakistan Basketball Federation.

== See also ==
- Pakistan men's national basketball team
- Pakistan women's national 3x3 team
