= Pakistan Army basketball team =

- Leagues: WAPDA Neelum Jhelum National Men’s Basketball Championship
- Team colors: Red, dark green

The Pakistan Army basketball team is a Pakistani domestic basketball team of the sports department of the Pakistan Army. Several of the team's players have played for the Pakistan national basketball team.

== Notable players ==
Note: Flags indicate national team eligibility at FIBA-sanctioned events. Players may hold other non-FIBA nationalities not displayed.

- (Pakistan) Nawazish Ali Lora
- (Pakistan) Pervaiz Hussain
- (Pakistan) Waheed Iqbal
