= Singapore men's national basketball team =

Singapore
- FIBA ranking: 132 ▲1 (1 September 2026)
- Joined FIBA: 1963
- FIBA zone: FIBA Asia
- National federation: Basketball Association of Singapore (BAS)
- Coach: Kwang Loong Joe So

Olympic Games
- Appearances: 1 (1956)
- Medals: None

FIBA World Cup
- Appearances: None

FIBA Asia Cup
- Appearances: 17
- Medals: None

SEABA Championship
- Appearances: 7
- Medals: Bronze: 2001, 2013, 2015
Home	Away	Third
Medal record
SEABA Championship
Bronze medal – third place	2001 Manila	Team
Bronze medal – third place	2013 Medan	Team
Bronze medal – third place	2015 Singapore	Team

The Singapore men's national basketball team is the national team for Singapore in basketball. It is managed by the Basketball Association of Singapore, formerly the Singapore Amateur Basketball Association (SABA).

At the Asian Basketball Championship, the country had its greatest success between 1971 and 1993 when it qualified for 12 straight events. Since 2001, the team has been one of the contenders at the Southeast Asian Basketball Championship. There, the team has won two bronze medals to date.

In 1956, the team qualified for the Summer Olympics where it finished ahead of Asian rivals South Korea and Thailand.

== History ==
On 5 June 2009, a "quiet revolution" took place in Singapore national men's basketball team. The team previously representing Singapore was replaced by young talents of the likes of Wei Jian Hong, Steven Khoo, Desmond Oh and Wei Long Wong, with only two senior players from the old squad retained: Pathman Matialakan and Michael Wong. Most of the national team players now play for the Singapore Slingers, the island's only professional basketball club.

=== 2011 Southeast Asian Games ===
The Singapore Men's National team left for the 2011 SEA Games having had the best preparation for a major tournament in the past 5 years. On 30 September to 1 October 2011, represented by most of the national team players, the Singapore Slingers was invited for the inaugural Cable Beach Invitational at Broome, Australia, where they played the Perth Wildcats and the Indonesia national basketball team. On 5 October 2011, the National team proceeded to play the Perth Redbacks of the Australian SBL. From 25 to 31 October 2011, the team competed in the 4th China-Asean Invitational Tournament, of which they finished 3rd overall in the competition.

After disappointing close losses to Malaysia and Indonesia, the team finished 5th at the 2011 Southeast Asian Games.

== Performances ==
=== Summer Olympics ===
Summer Olympic Record
Year	Tournament	Position	PLD	W	L
(Australia) Melbourne 1956	1956 Summer Olympics	13	7	2	5

=== FIBA Asia Cup ===
Year	Position	Pld	W	L
(Philippines) 1960	Part of Malaya			
(Taiwan) 1963	7th place	10	3	7
(Malaysia) 1965	9th place	7	1	6
(South Korea) 1967	10th place	9	0	9
(Thailand) 1969	did not enter			
(Japan) 1971	8th place	8	1	7
(Philippines) 1973	10th place	10	3	7
(Thailand) 1975	7th place	9	6	3
(Malaysia) 1977	11th place	9	4	5
(Japan) 1979	10th place	8	3	5
(India) 1981	11th place	7	2	5
(Hong Kong) 1983	14th place	5	1	4
(Malaysia) 1985	12th place	6	1	5
(Thailand) 1987	11th place	7	2	5
(China) 1989	11th place	7	4	3
(Japan) 1991	10th place	8	4	4
(Indonesia) 1993	16th place	6	0	6
(South Korea) 1995	did not enter			
(Saudi Arabia) 1997	did not enter			
(Japan) 1999	did not qualify			
(China) 2001	14th place	6	0	6
(China) 2003	did not enter			
(Qatar) 2005	did not qualify			
(Japan) 2007	did not qualify			
(China) 2009	did not qualify			
(China) 2011	did not qualify			
(Philippines) 2013	did not qualify			
(China) 2015	15th place	5	1	4
(Lebanon) 2017	did not qualify			
(Indonesia) 2022	did not qualify			
(Saudi Arabia) 2025	did not qualify			
2029	did not qualify			
Total	17/32	127	36	91

=== Southeast Asian Championship ===
- 2001: (bronze)
- 2005: 4th
- 2007: 5th
- 2009: 4th
- 2011: 4th
- 2013: (bronze)
- 2015: (bronze)

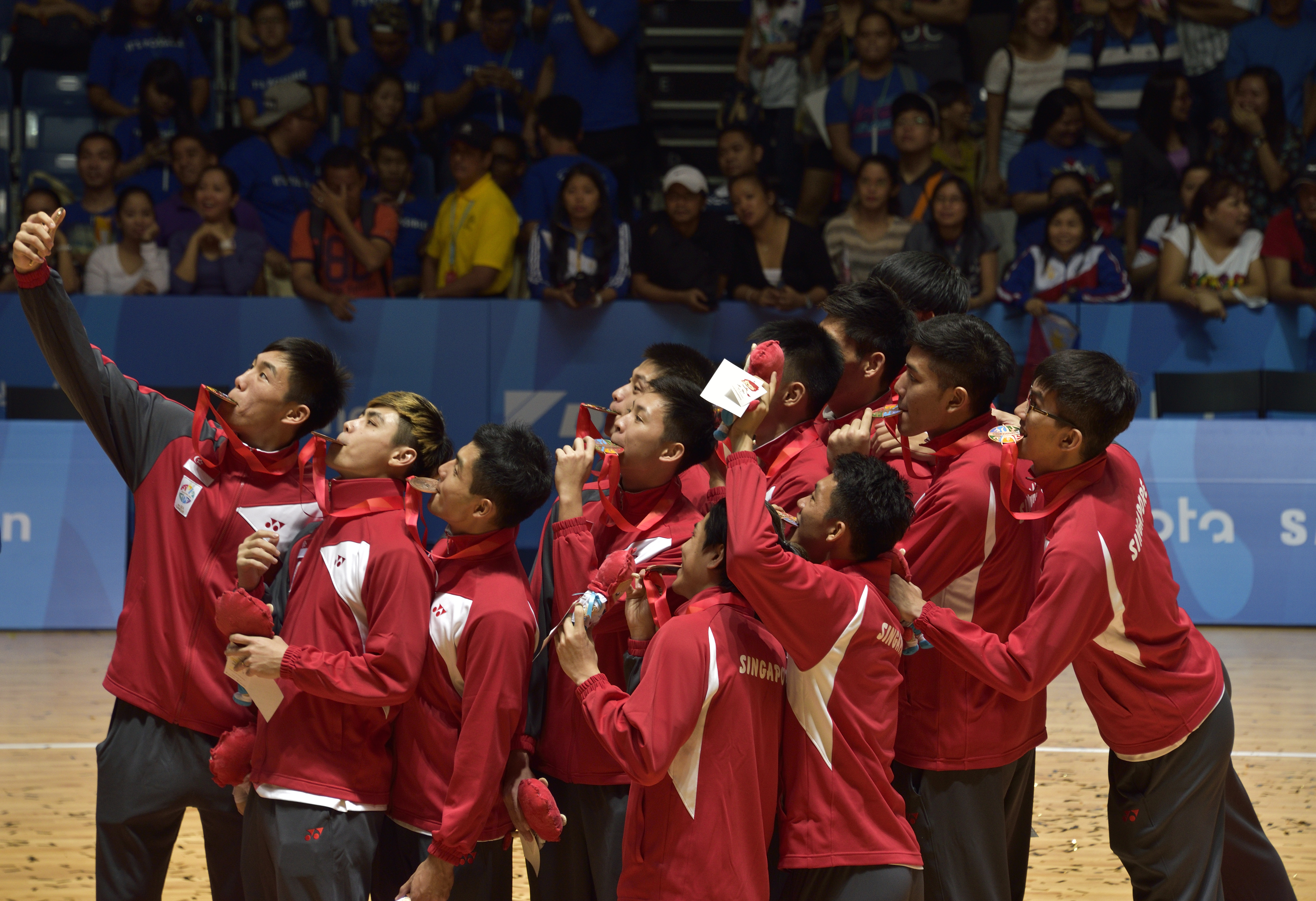
The Singapore team that won bronze at the 2015 SEA Games

=== SEA Games ===
- 1977: 4th
- 1979: (bronze)
- 1981: 4th
- 1983: 4th
- 1989: 4th
- 1991: 4th
- 1995: 5th
- 2001: 5th
- 2003: 4th
- 2011: 5th
- 2013: (bronze)
- 2015: (bronze)
- 2017: 4th
- 2019: 5th
- 2021: 6th
- 2023: 7th

== Team ==
=== Current roster ===
Roster at the 2019 SEA Games.

Singapore National Basketball Team roster
Players
Coaches

Pos.	No.	Name	Age – Date of birth	Height	Club
C	0	V Lavin Raj	19 – 27 June 2000	2.00 m (6 ft 7 in)	Xin Hua Sports Club	(Singapore)
G	2	Isaac Jui Kwang Low	25 – 5 March 1994	1.91 m (6 ft 3 in)	''Unattached''	(Singapore)
G	5	Wei Long Wong	31 – 18 August 1988	1.74 m (5 ft 9 in)	Adroit Sports Association	(Singapore)
G/F	7	Xing Yuan Han	23 – 31 May 1996	1.89 m (6 ft 2 in)	Xin Hua Sports Club	(Singapore)
G	9	Vignesh Rengarajan	21 – 8 November 1998	1.83 m (6 ft 0 in)	Siglap Basketball Club	(Singapore)
G/F	10	Leon Kwek	23 – 19 August 1996	1.88 m (6 ft 2 in)	SAFSA	(Singapore)
G	11	Larry Liew	26 – 7 May 1993	1.91 m (6 ft 3 in)	Adroit Sports Association	(Singapore)
F	22	Kelvin Lim	23 – 28 September 1996	1.90 m (6 ft 3 in)	SBPHK Hornets	(Singapore)
C	23	Delvin Goh	24 – 14 April 1995	2.00 m (6 ft 7 in)	Siglap Basketball Club	(Singapore)
G	24	Qing Huang Toh	24 – 16 January 1995	1.83 m (6 ft 0 in)	Adroit Sports Association	(Singapore)
G	30	Zhong Han Wong	22 – 11 August 1997	1.83 m (6 ft 0 in)	Adroit Sports Association	(Singapore)
F	83	Chase Tan	29 – 1 April 1990	1.86 m (6 ft 1 in)	SBPHK Hornets	(Singapore)

Head coach

Hsu Tung Ching

Assistant coach(es)

Koh Meng Koon

Legend

- (C) Team captain
- Club field describes current pro club

=== Past rosters ===
Roster for the 2017 SEABA Championship.

Singapore National Basketball Team roster
Players
Coaches

Pos.	No.	Name	Age – Date of birth	Height	Club
G	01	Jun Yuan Lim	19 – 15 January 1997	1.77 m (5 ft 10 in)	Siglap Basketball Club	(Singapore)
G	04	Jonathan Cheok	20 – 17 April 1996	1.81 m (5 ft 11 in)	Siglap Basketball Club	(Singapore)
G	05	Wei Long Wong	28 – 18 August 1988	1.74 m (5 ft 9 in)	Adroit Sports Association	(Singapore)
G/F	09	John Ng	22 – 4 September 1994	1.90 m (6 ft 3 in)	Xin Hua Sports Club	(Singapore)
F	10	Leon Kwek	20 – 19 August 1996	1.88 m (6 ft 2 in)	Adroit Sports Association	(Singapore)
G	11	Larry Liew	23 – 7 May 1993	1.91 m (6 ft 3 in)	Adroit Sports Association	(Singapore)
F	14	Lyon Chia	20 – 7 December 1996	1.88 m (6 ft 2 in)	Xin Hua Sports Club	(Singapore)
F	17	Han Bin Ng	27 – 13 January 1989	1.94 m (6 ft 4 in)	Adroit Sports Association	(Singapore)
C	23	Delvin Goh	21 – 14 April 1995	2.02 m (6 ft 8 in)	SAFSA	(Singapore)
C	26	Justin Lim	22 – 17 November 1994	1.94 m (6 ft 4 in)	Siglap Basketball Club	(Singapore)
C	34	V Lavin Raj	16 – 27 June 2000	2.00 m (6 ft 7 in)	Kai Xuan	(Singapore)
F	83	Chase Tan	26 – 1 April 1990	1.87 m (6 ft 2 in)	SBPHK Hornets	(Singapore)

Head coach

(Australia) Frank Arsego

Assistant coach(es)

Joe So, Neo Nam Kheng

Legend

- (C) Team captain
- Club field describes current pro club

== Head coaches ==
- (Singapore) Lee Liak Meng (1978)
- (Singapore) Chan Kwok Hung (1979)
- (Singapore) Chan Wah Kwee and Ong Koon Huat (1980 to 1986)
- (Philippines) Nic Jorge (1983) - Advisor Coach
- (Singapore) Eddie Ng Hang Kee (1987-1991, 2001–2003)
- (Singapore) Beng Siang Neo (2006, 2009–2013)
- (Singapore) So Kwang Loong (2014)
- (Singapore) Beng Siang Neo (2015)
- (Singapore) Neo Nam Kheng (2016)
- (Australia) Frank Arsego (2016–2018)
- (Singapore) Hsu Tung Ching (2018–2019)
- (Singapore) Neo Nam Kheng (2020–2023)
- (Singapore) Kwang Loong Joe So (2025–)

== Kit ==
=== Manufacturer ===
2015: Kappa

== See also ==
- Singapore women's national basketball team
- Singapore national under-19 basketball team
- Singapore national under-17 basketball team
- National Basketball League
