= 1979 ABC Championship =

1979 FIBA Asia Cup
10th Asian Basketball Championship

Tournament details
- Host country: Japan
- Dates: November 30 – December 12
- Teams: 13
- Venue(s): 1 (in 1 host city)

Final positions
- Champions: China (3rd title)

The 1979 Asian Basketball Confederation Championship for Men were held in Nagoya, Japan.

== Preliminary round ==
=== Group A ===
Team	Pld	W	L	PF	PA	PD	Pts
China	3	3	0	319	199	+120	6
India	3	2	1	229	233	−4	5
Iraq	3	1	2	259	281	−22	4
Bahrain	3	0	3	200	294	−94	3

December 1

China	96–56	India
Scoring by half: 52–26, 44–30

Nagoya

December 2

Bahrain	63–80	India
Scoring by half: 30–38, 33–42

Nagoya

December 2

China	105–89	Iraq
Scoring by half: 57–41, 48–48

Nagoya

December 3

Bahrain	83–96	Iraq
Scoring by half: 57–41, 26–55

Nagoya

December 4

China	118–54	Bahrain
Scoring by half: 57–34, 61–20

Nagoya

December 5

Iraq	74–93	India
Scoring by half: 36–48, 38–45

Nagoya

=== Group B ===
Team	Pld	W	L	PF	PA	PD	Pts
South Korea	3	3	0	366	251	+115	6
Philippines	3	2	1	326	264	+62	5
Thailand	3	1	2	252	307	−55	4
Singapore	3	0	3	227	349	−122	3

December 1

South Korea	130–68	Thailand
Scoring by half: 73–44, 57–24

Nagoya

December 2

Singapore	65–128	Philippines
Scoring by half: 32–66, 33–62

Nagoya

December 3

Thailand	103–86	Singapore
Scoring by half: 54–22, 49–34

Nagoya

December 3

South Korea	118–107	Philippines
Scoring by half: 62–58, 56–49

Nagoya

December 4

South Korea	118–76	Singapore
Scoring by half: 61–36, 57–40

Nagoya

December 5

Thailand	81–91	Philippines
Scoring by half: 36–43, 45–48

Nagoya

=== Group C ===
Team	Pld	W	L	PF	PA	PD	Pts
Japan	4	4	0	477	239	+238	8
Pakistan	4	3	1	389	352	+37	7
Malaysia	4	2	2	427	331	+96	6
Hong Kong	4	1	3	322	390	−68	5
Bangladesh	4	0	4	253	556	−303	4

November 30

Japan	121–80	Pakistan
Scoring by half: 61–45, 60–35

Nagoya

December 1

Hong Kong	114–73	Bangladesh
Scoring by half: 57–41, 57–32

Nagoya

December 1

Malaysia	72–84	Japan
Scoring by half: 24–46, 48–38

Nagoya

December 2

Malaysia	87–90	Pakistan
Scoring by half: 48–57, 39–33

Nagoya

December 2

Hong Kong	45–121	Japan
Scoring by half: 31–61, 14–60

Nagoya

December 3

Pakistan	120–67	Bangladesh
Scoring by half: 63–29, 57–38

Nagoya

December 4

Hong Kong	86–97	Malaysia
Scoring by half: 43–59, 43–38

Nagoya

December 4

Bangladesh	42–151	Japan
Scoring by half: 23–89, 19–62

Nagoya

December 5

Bangladesh	71–171	Malaysia
Scoring by half: 38–71, 33–100

Nagoya

December 5

Hong Kong	77–99	Pakistan
Scoring by half: 46–53, 31–46

Nagoya

== Final round ==
- The results and the points of the matches between the same teams that were already played during the preliminary round shall be taken into account for the final round.

=== Classification 7th–13th ===
Team	Pld	W	L	PF	PA	PD	Pts
Malaysia	6	6	0	663	479	+184	12
Iraq	6	5	1	608	473	+135	11
Thailand	6	4	2	619	500	+119	10
Singapore	6	3	3	545	550	−5	9
Hong Kong	6	2	4	503	523	−20	8
Bahrain	6	1	5	483	536	−53	7
Bangladesh	6	0	6	430	790	−360	6

December 7

Thailand	109–76	Hong Kong
Scoring by half: 49–48, 60–28

Nagoya

December 7

Bahrain	114–66	Bangladesh
Scoring by half: 64–26, 50–40

Nagoya

December 7

Malaysia	123–90	Singapore
Scoring by half: 62–42, 61–48

Nagoya

December 8

Iraq	139–76	Bangladesh
Scoring by half: 72–38, 67–38

Nagoya

December 8

Hong Kong	78–86	Singapore
Scoring by half: 43–51, 35–35

Nagoya

December 8

Thailand	112–90	Bahrain
Scoring by half: 55–42, 57–48

Nagoya

December 9

Iraq	100–72	Hong Kong
Scoring by half: 60–41, 40–31

Nagoya

December 9

Malaysia	89–82	Thailand
Scoring by half: 47–45, 42–37

Nagoya

December 9

Singapore	86–71	Bahrain
Scoring by half: 47–36, 39–35

Nagoya

December 10

Thailand	145–74	Bangladesh
Scoring by half: 52–29, 93–45

Nagoya

December 10

Singapore	90–105	Iraq
Scoring by half: 48–57, 42–48

Nagoya

December 10

Malaysia	99–67	Bahrain
Scoring by half: 59–29, 40–38

Nagoya

December 11

Hong Kong	77–58	Bahrain
Scoring by half: 29–38, 48–20

Nagoya

December 11

Singapore	107–70	Bangladesh
Scoring by half: 65–36, 42–34

Nagoya

December 11

Iraq	83–84	Malaysia
Scoring by half: 38–45, 45–39

Nagoya

December 12

Iraq	85–68	Thailand
Scoring by half: 50–30, 35–38

Nagoya

=== Championship ===
Team	Pld	W	L	PF	PA	PD	Pts
China	5	5	0	503	360	+143	10
Japan	5	4	1	497	384	+113	9
South Korea	5	3	2	505	452	+53	8
Philippines	5	2	3	508	539	−31	7
India	5	1	4	366	467	−101	6
Pakistan	5	0	5	398	575	−177	5

December 7

India	78–93	South Korea
Scoring by half: 30–56, 48–37

Nagoya

December 7

Japan	111–94	Philippines
Scoring by half: 54–42, 57–52

Nagoya

December 8

China	124–89	Philippines
Scoring by half: 66–44, 58–45

Nagoya

December 8

South Korea	121–73	Pakistan
Scoring by half: 59–45, 62–28

Nagoya

December 9

Japan	97–55	India
Scoring by half: 49–24, 48–31

Nagoya

December 9

China	119–59	Pakistan
Scoring by half: 56–32, 63–27

Nagoya

December 9

India	86–95	Philippines
Scoring by half: 44–54, 42–41

Nagoya

December 10

South Korea	85–100	Japan
Scoring by half: 39–62, 46–38

Nagoya

December 10

Philippines	123–100	Pakistan
Scoring by half: 69–45, 54–55

Nagoya

December 11

Japan	68–70 (OT)	China
Scoring by half: 33–38, 31–26 Overtime: 4–6

Nagoya

December 12

South Korea	88–94	China
Scoring by half: 48–45, 40–49

Nagoya

December 12

India	91–86	Pakistan
Scoring by half: 48–43, 43–43

Nagoya

== Final standings ==
Qualified for the 1980 Summer Olympics

Rank	Team	Record
1st place, gold medalist(s)	China	7–0
2nd place, silver medalist(s)	Japan	7–1
3rd place, bronze medalist(s)	South Korea	5–2
4	Philippines	4–3
5	India	3–4
6	Pakistan	3–5
7	Malaysia	6–2
8	Iraq	5–3
9	Thailand	4–4
10	Singapore	3–5
11	Hong Kong	2–6
12	Bahrain	1–7
13	Bangladesh	0–8

== Awards ==
1979 Asian champions

China
Third title
