= FIBA Asia Cup =

Men's basketball competition

- Most recent season or competition: 2025 FIBA Asia Cup
- Formerly: FIBA Asia Championship; ABC Championship
- Sport: Basketball
- Founded: 1960; 66 years ago
- First season: 1960
- No. of teams: 16
- Country: FIBA Asia member nations; FIBA Oceania member nations
- Continent: Asia-Pacific
- Most recent champion: Australia (3rd title)
- Most titles: China (16 titles)
- Related competitions: FIBA Women's Asia Cup
- Website: FIBA Asia

The FIBA Asia Cup (formerly the FIBA Asia Championship and ABC Championship) is an international basketball tournament which takes place every four years between the men's national teams of Asia and Oceania.

Through the 2015 edition, the tournament took place every two years and was also a qualifying tournament for the FIBA World Cup and the Olympic basketball tournament. Since 2017, however, the tournament was renamed the FIBA Asia Cup and now includes teams from FIBA Oceania. Also, it was the first to be played on a new four-year cycle, and is no longer a part of the qualifying process for the World Cup or the Olympics.

== History ==
=== Beginnings: Philippines/Japan dominance ===
The Asian Basketball Confederation (ABC) Championship was inaugurated in Manila in 1960. The championship was held to find Asia's best team and for qualification to the World Championship and the Olympics. On the next four tournaments, the Philippines won 3 with the Japanese beating the Filipinos in 1965. Korea, Japan and the Philippines split the next 3 championships until China debuted in 1975 at Bangkok with the championship, where they have dominated for 40 years.

=== Chinese dominance ===
Right after the Philippines had started sending amateur players when the Philippine Basketball Association was established in 1975 as the first professional basketball league in Asia and therefore not allowed to lend the country's best players, China emerged as the new dominant country in Asian basketball.

From 1975 to 2007, there were only two instances where China did not win the championship. In 1985, the Philippines defeated a full-strength Chinese team, which were by then five-time defending champions, in the championship round. The Chinese then won every game in the championship until 1997, where they lost to South Korea in the semi-finals when they complained about the climate in Riyadh. The Koreans beat the Japanese in the final, but the Chinese would then start a championship streak of four tournaments, led by Yao Ming.

=== Renaming ===
By 2005, the tournament had been renamed as the FIBA Asia Championship; in that year's tournament in Doha, the Chinese easily won against the Lebanese in the final. During the 2007 championship, the Chinese did not send their "A" team since they had already qualified to the Olympics by virtue of hosting it. In this championship, West Asian teams started to compete with the traditional East Asian powers, as evidenced of an all-West Asian final when Iran defeated Lebanon. In 2009, Iran defeated the Chinese team A in the 2009 final to become only the 3rd team to successfully defend the championship. The 2009 championship started a streak of finals contested between a team from the Middle East and a team from the Far East; in 2011, Iran was eliminated by Jordan in the quarter-finals, which would then lose to hosts China by one point in the final. The 2013 championship would be the first to be hosted outside East Asia since 2005 in the Philippines, the hosts, emerged as finalists; China had been eliminated by Chinese Taipei in the quarter-finals, which were then defeated by the Iranians, who then beat the Filipinos in the Final.

=== Removal of qualification status ===
As FIBA implemented a new cycle and tournament format, the 2013 FIBA Asia Championship held in Manila and the 2015 FIBA Asia Championship held in Changsha were the last Asian Championships to serve as qualification to either the FIBA Basketball World Cup and the Olympic Games, respectively. The 2017 FIBA Asia Championship marked firsts and lasts for the Asian Championship, as it was the first Asian Championship as a standalone tournament, meaning it did not serve as the qualifier for either the Basketball World Cup or the Olympic Games. The 2017 tournament was the last Asian Championships to be ever held under a 2-year cycle. After 2017, the Asian Championships and the FIBA Oceania Championship merged into a tournament to be known as the FIBA Asia Cup. It is held every four years like the EuroBasket, AfroBasket and AmeriCup, which are held two years before and after the FIBA World Cup.

== Qualification ==
Qualification is via the different FIBA Asia subzones. The East, Gulf, Southeast and West subzones receive two berths each, while the Central and South zones get one each. The host and the champion from the preceding FIBA Asia Cup also get a berth each. Each subzone conducts a qualification tournament up to a year before the championship to determine the qualifying teams. The other four berths are distributed to the subzones in reference to their performance in the previous year's FIBA Asia Cup, with the subzone receiving an extra berth for each team in the top four excluding the champion and the host.

== Tournament format ==
There had been a variety of tournament formats used before. Most were similar to the format of two group stages and a knockout stage. The current format, as first applied in 2017, is a multistage tournament. The 16 teams are grouped in four groups in the preliminary round. The teams play against each other once; the top team will directly advance to the quarter-finals, and the second placed teams will play an elimination game between the third placed team of another group. The four winning teams of the elimination games will advance to the quarter-finals. After the elimination games, the knock-out phase will follow.

The classification games will be conducted as follows:

1. 13–16th place games are for the teams eliminated from the group phase.
2. The 9th to 12th place games are for the losing teams of the elimination games.
3. The 5–8th place games are for the eliminated teams in the quarter-finals.

== Summary ==
#	Year	Hosts	Final			Third-place game			Teams
#	Year	Hosts	Champions	Score	Runners-up	Third place	Score	Fourth place	Teams
1	1960; Details	(Philippines); Manila	Philippines	No playoffs	Republic of China	Japan	No playoffs	South Korea	7
2	1963; Details	(Taiwan); Taipei	Philippines	91–77	Republic of China	South Korea	No playoffs	Thailand	8
3	1965; Details	(Malaysia); Kuala Lumpur	Japan	No playoffs	Philippines	South Korea	No playoffs	Thailand	10
4	1967; Details	(South Korea); Seoul	Philippines	No playoffs	South Korea	Japan	No playoffs	Indonesia	10
5	1969; Details	(Thailand); Bangkok	South Korea	No playoffs	Japan	Philippines	No playoffs	Republic of China	9
6	1971; Details	(Japan); Tokyo	Japan	No playoffs	Philippines	South Korea	No playoffs	Republic of China	9
7	1973; Details	(Philippines); Manila	Philippines	No playoffs	South Korea	Republic of China	No playoffs	Japan	12
8	1975; Details	(Thailand); Bangkok	China	No playoffs	Japan	South Korea	No playoffs	India	13
9	1977; Details	(Malaysia); Kuala Lumpur	China	No playoffs	South Korea	Japan	No playoffs	Malaysia	14
10	1979; Details	(Japan); Nagoya	China	No playoffs	Japan	South Korea	No playoffs	Philippines	13
11	1981; Details	(India); Kolkata	China	No playoffs	South Korea	Japan	No playoffs	Philippines	12
12	1983; Details	Hong Kong	China	95–71	Japan	South Korea	83–60	Kuwait	15
13	1985; Details	(Malaysia); Kuala Lumpur	Philippines	No playoffs	South Korea	China	No playoffs	Malaysia	15
14	1987; Details	(Thailand); Bangkok	China	86–79; OT	South Korea	Japan	89–75	Philippines	15
15	1989; Details	(China); Beijing	China	102–72	South Korea	Chinese Taipei	69–58	Japan	15
16	1991; Details	(Japan); Kobe	China	104–88	South Korea	Japan	63–60	Chinese Taipei	18
17	1993; Details	(Indonesia); Jakarta	China	93–72	North Korea	South Korea	86–70	Iran	18
18	1995; Details	(South Korea); Seoul	China	87–78	South Korea	Japan	69–63	Chinese Taipei	19
19	1997; Details	(Saudi Arabia); Riyadh	South Korea	78–76	Japan	China	94–68	Saudi Arabia	15
20	1999; Details	(Japan); Fukuoka	China	63–45	South Korea	Saudi Arabia	93–67	Chinese Taipei	15
21	2001; Details	(China); Shanghai	China	97–63	Lebanon	South Korea	95–94; OT	Syria	14
22	2003; Details	(China); Harbin	China	106–96	South Korea	Qatar	77–67	Lebanon	16
23	2005; Details	(Qatar); Doha	China	77–61	Lebanon	Qatar	89–77	South Korea	16
24	2007; Details	(Japan); Tokushima	Iran	74–69	Lebanon	South Korea	80–76	Kazakhstan	16
25	2009; Details	(China); Tianjin	Iran	70–52	China	Jordan	80–66	Lebanon	16
26	2011; Details	(China); Wuhan	China	70–69	Jordan	South Korea	70–68	Philippines	16
27	2013; Details	(Philippines); Manila	Iran	85–71	Philippines	South Korea	75–57	Chinese Taipei	15
28	2015; Details	(China); Changsha	China	78–67	Philippines	Iran	68–63	Japan	16
29	2017; Details	(Lebanon); Zouk Mikael	Australia	79–56	Iran	South Korea	80–71	New Zealand	16
30	2022 (Note: Originally scheduled for 2021, but postponed to 2022 due to the COVID-19 pandemic.); Details	(Indonesia); Jakarta	Australia	75–73	Lebanon	New Zealand	83–75	Jordan	16
31	2025; Details	(Saudi Arabia); Jeddah	Australia	90–89	China	Iran	79–73	New Zealand	16
32	2029; Details	TBD; TBD		–			–		

== Medal table ==
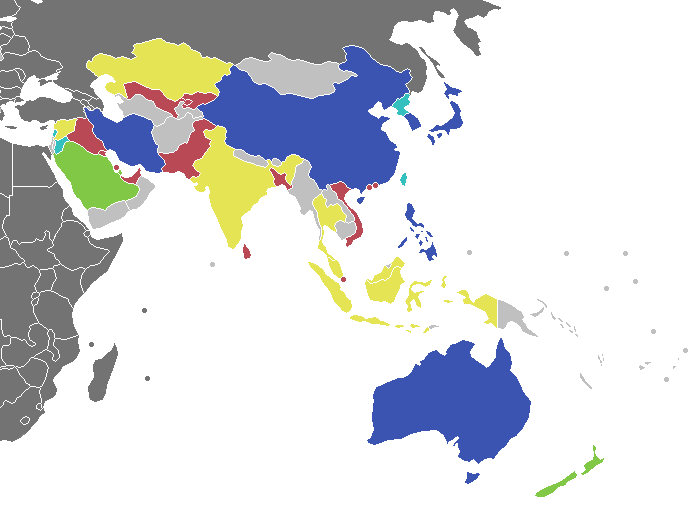
Map of the teams' best results.: Champions; Runners-up; Third place; Fourth place to eighth place; Lower than eighth place; FIBA Asia or FIBA Oceania member, no appearance yet; Not a member of FIBA Asia or FIBA Oceania

Rank	Nation	Gold	Silver	Bronze	Total
1	China	16	2	2	20
2	Philippines	5	4	1	10
3	Iran	3	1	2	6
4	Australia	3	0	0	3
5	South Korea	2	11	12	25
6	Japan	2	5	7	14
7	Lebanon	0	4	0	4
8	Chinese Taipei	0	2	2	4
9	Jordan	0	1	1	2
10	North Korea	0	1	0	1
11	Qatar	0	0	2	2
12	New Zealand	0	0	1	1
12	Saudi Arabia	0	0	1	1
Totals (13 entries)		31	31	31	93

Host cities of the FIBA Asia Cup. Cities denoted by blue pogs had hosted more than once.
Host cities of the FIBA Asia Cup (Japan).

== Tournament awards ==
Most recent award winners (2025)

Year	Player	Position	Team
2025	Sina Vahedi	Guard	Iran
2025	Jaylin Galloway	Forward	Australia
2025	Jack McVeigh	Forward	Australia
2025	Wang Junjie	Forward	China
2025	Hu Jinqiu	Center	China

== Tournament leaders ==
- Minimum of five games played (GP).

=== All-time ===
==== Highest scoring averages ====
Rank	Player	Team	GP	Pts	PPG	Tournaments
1	Michael Madanly	Syria	11	314	28.5	(Japan) 2007, (Lebanon) 2017
2	Sani Sakakini	Palestine	8	179	22.4	(China) 2015
3	Zaid Al-Khas	Jordan	7	156	22.3	(China) 2003
4	Fadi El Khatib	Lebanon	39	860	22.1	(China) 2001, (Kuwait) 2005, (Japan) 2007, (China) 2009, (Lebanon) 2017
5	Jamal Abu-Shamala	Palestine	8	172	21.5	(China) 2015
6	Wael Arakji	Lebanon	10	212	21.2	(Lebanon) 2017, (Indonesia) 2022
7	Abdullah Alsarraf	Kuwait	14	290	20.7	(China) 2003, (Kuwait) 2005
8	Mohamed Abo Sada	Syria	7	139	19.9	(China) 2003
9	Satyaseelan Kuppusamy	Malaysia	7	138	19.7	(China) 2003
10	Rasheim Wright	Jordan	26	504	19.4	(Japan) 2007, (China) 2009, (China) 2011

==== Cumulative top scorers ====
Rank	Player	Team	GP	Pts	PPG
1	Fadi El Khatib	Lebanon	39	860	22.1
2	Hamed Haddadi	Iran	60	855	14.3
3	Samad Nikkhah Bahrami	Iran	44	615	14.0
4	Yi Jianlian	China	36	551	15.3
5	Anton Ponomarev	Kazakhstan	43	548	12.7
6	Kim Joo-sung	South Korea	50	523	10.5
7	Rasheim Wright	Jordan	26	504	19.4
8	Daoud Musa Daoud	Qatar	45	487	10.8
9	Wang Zhizhi	China	34	472	13.9
10	Abdulrahman Saad	Qatar	41	467	11.4

=== Per tournament ===
==== Points ====
Year	Player	Team	GP	Pts	PPG
2007	Michael Madanly	Syria	7	232	33.1
2007	Fadi El Khatib	Lebanon	8	218	27.3
2009	Rasheim Wright	Jordan	9	186	20.7
2011	Marcus Douthit	Philippines	9	197	21.9
2013	Hamed Haddadi	Iran	9	169	18.8
2017	Fadi El Khatib	Lebanon	7	181	25.9
2015	Sani Sakakini	Palestine	8	179	22.4

==== Rebounds ====
Year	Player	Team	GP	Reb	RPG
2007	Wissam Yakoub	Syria	7	74	10.6
2009	Hamed Haddadi	Iran	9	118	13.1
2011	Marcus Douthit	Philippines	9	110	12.2
2013	Hamed Haddadi	Iran	9	90	10.0
2015	Sani Sakakini	Palestine	8	101	12.6
2017	Hamed Haddadi	Iran	6	65	10.8

==== Assists ====
Year	Player	Team	GP	Ast	APG
2007	Sambhaji Kadam	India	7	28	4.0
2009	Samad Nikkhah Bahrami	Iran	9	43	4.8
2011	Mario Wuysang	Indonesia	5	32	6.4
2013	Mehdi Kamrani	Iran	9	59	6.6
2015	Imad Qahwash	Palestine	8	48	6.0
2017	Hamed Haddadi	Iran	6	39	6.5

== Participating nations ==
=== 20th century ===
Nation	(Philippines) 1960	(Taiwan) 1963	(Malaysia) 1965	(South Korea) 1967	(Thailand) 1969	(Japan) 1971	(Philippines) 1973	(Thailand) 1975	(Malaysia) 1977	(Japan) 1979	(India) 1981	(Hong Kong) 1983	(Malaysia) 1985	(Thailand) 1987	(China) 1989	(Japan) 1991	(Indonesia) 1993	(South Korea) 1995	(Saudi Arabia) 1997	(Japan) 1999
Bahrain									12th	12th				13th		15th			10th	12th
Bangladesh										13th					15th		18th		15th	
China								1st	1st	1st	1st	1st	3rd	1st	1st	1st	1st	1st	3rd	1st
Chinese Taipei	2nd	2nd	5th	5th	4th	4th	3rd						6th	5th	3rd	4th	5th	4th	6th	4th
Hong Kong	5th	6th	8th	9th	9th	9th	11th	9th	10th	11th	10th	7th	13th	14th	13th	11th	13th	15th	14th	13th
India			7th	6th	5th	6th	6th	4th	7th	5th	5th	6th	10th	6th	6th	13th		13th	11th	
Indonesia	6th			4th			8th	10th	13th			12th	11th	12th	14th	14th	12th	18th	12th	
Iran							5th				8th	5th	8th		5th	6th	4th	10th	8th	
Iraq									6th	8th				9th						
Japan	3rd		1st	3rd	2nd	1st	4th	2nd	3rd	2nd	3rd	2nd	5th	3rd	4th	3rd	7th	3rd	2nd	5th
Jordan												8th	9th	10th		8th	9th	17th	7th	
Kazakhstan																		5th	13th	
Kuwait								12th				4th				12th	10th	11th		6th
Kyrgyzstan																		8th		
Lebanon																				7th
Macau												15th		15th						
Malaysia	7th	5th	6th	8th	7th	5th	9th	8th	4th	7th	6th	11th	4th	7th	9th	17th	14th	14th		15th
North Korea																5th	2nd			
Pakistan					8th		12th	11th	9th	6th	9th	13th	14th		10th		17th			
Philippines	1st	1st	2nd	1st	3rd	2nd	1st	5th	5th	4th	4th	9th	1st	4th	8th	7th	11th	12th	9th	11th
Qatar																16th				
Saudi Arabia															7th	9th	6th	6th	4th	3rd
Singapore		7th	9th	10th		8th	10th	7th	11th	10th	11th	14th	12th	11th	11th	10th	16th			
South Korea	4th	3rd	3rd	2nd	1st	3rd	2nd	3rd	2nd	3rd	2nd	3rd	2nd	2nd	2nd	2nd	3rd	2nd	1st	2nd
Sri Lanka								13th	14th		12th		15th			18th		19th		
Syria																				8th
Thailand		4th	4th	7th	6th	7th	7th	6th	8th	9th	7th	10th	7th	8th	12th		15th	16th		14th
United Arab Emirates																	8th	9th	5th	10th
Uzbekistan																		7th		9th
Vietnam		8th	10th																	
Total	7	8	10	10	9	9	12	13	14	13	12	15	15	15	15	18	18	19	15	15

=== 21st century ===
Nation	(China) 2001	(China) 2003	(Qatar) 2005	(Japan) 2007	(China) 2009	(China) 2011	(Philippines) 2013	(China) 2015	(Lebanon) 2017	(Indonesia) 2022	(Saudi Arabia) 2025	TBD 2029	Years
Australia									1st	1st	1st		3
Bahrain						15th	12th			13th			9
Bangladesh													4
China	1st	1st	1st	10th	2nd	1st	5th	1st	5th	8th	2nd		24
Chinese Taipei	7th	11th	9th	6th	5th	8th	4th	13th	12th	10th	5th		26
Guam											12th		1
Hong Kong	11th	13th	15th	13th			10th	12th	15th				27
India	8th	8th	12th	15th	13th	14th	11th	8th	14th	16th	15th		27
Indonesia			14th	12th	15th	13th				11th			18
Iran		5th	6th	1st	1st	5th	1st	3rd	2nd	5th	3rd		19
Iraq									11th		14th		5
Japan	6th	6th	5th	8th	10th	7th	9th	4th	9th	7th	9th		30
Jordan		10th	7th	5th	3rd	2nd	7th	9th	8th	4th	11th		17
Kazakhstan		7th	10th	4th	9th		8th	11th	16th	15th			10
Kuwait	12th	12th	13th	14th	11th			14th					12
Kyrgyzstan													1
Lebanon	2nd	4th	2nd	2nd	4th	6th		5th	6th	2nd	8th		11
Macau													2
Malaysia		16th	16th			11th	15th	16th					24
New Zealand									4th	3rd	4th		3
North Korea													2
Pakistan													10
Palestine								10th					1
Philippines		15th		9th	8th	4th	2nd	2nd	7th	9th	7th		29
Qatar	5th	3rd	3rd	7th	6th	16th	6th	7th	13th		13th		11
Saudi Arabia			8th				13th			14th	10th		10
Singapore	14th							15th					17
South Korea	3rd	2nd	4th	3rd	7th	3rd	3rd	6th	3rd	6th	6th		31
Sri Lanka					16th								7
Syria	4th	9th		11th		9th			10th	12th	16th		8
Thailand	13th						14th						19
United Arab Emirates	10th			16th	12th	10th							8
Uzbekistan	9th	14th	11th		14th	12th							7
Vietnam													2
Total	14	16	16	16	16	16	15	16	16	16	16	16	

== Debut of teams ==
A total of 34 national teams have appeared in at least one FIBA Asia Cup in the history of the tournament through the 2025 competition. Countries competing in their first Asia Cup are listed below by year.

Year	Debutants	Number
1960	Chinese Taipei, Hong Kong, Indonesia, Japan, Malaysia, Philippines, South Korea	7
1963	Singapore Thailand, Vietnam	10
1965	India	11
1967	None	11
1969	Pakistan	12
1971	None	12
1973	Iran	13
1975	China, Kuwait, Sri Lanka	16
1977	Bahrain, Iraq	18
1979	Bangladesh	19
1981	None	19
1983	Jordan, Macau	21
1985	None	21
1987	None	21
1989	Saudi Arabia	22
1991	North Korea, Qatar	24
1993	United Arab Emirates	25
1995	Kazakhstan, Kyrgyzstan, Uzbekistan	28
1997	None	28
1999	Lebanon, Syria	30
2001	None	30
2003	None	30
2005	None	30
2007	None	30
2009	None	30
2011	None	30
2013	None	30
2015	Palestine	31
2017	Australia, New Zealand	33
2022	None	33
2025	Guam	34
2029	TBD	34
Total		34

== General statistics ==
All-time statistics, as of the 2025 FIBA Asia Cup.

Team	GP	Won	Lost	Pct.
Australia	18	18	0	100.00%
Bahrain	62	20	42	32.26%
Bangladesh	25	0	25	0.00%
China	185	168	17	90.81%
Chinese Taipei	197	118	79	59.90%
Hong Kong	194	53	141	27.32%
India	181	71	110	39.23%
Indonesia	120	33	87	27.50%
Iran	140	95	45	67.86%
Iraq	32	14	18	43.75%
Japan	225	148	77	65.78%
Jordan	123	64	59	52.03%
Kazakhstan	67	28	39	41.79%
Kuwait	84	29	55	34.52%
Kyrgyzstan	8	3	5	37.50%
Lebanon	84	51	33	60.71%
Macau	12	0	12	0.00%
Malaysia	175	59	116	33.71%
New Zealand	19	12	7	63.16%
North Korea	14	10	4	71.43%
Pakistan	73	21	52	28.77%
Palestine	8	4	4	50.00%
Philippines	220	143	77	65.00%
Qatar	75	36	39	48.00%
Saudi Arabia	64	31	33	48.44%
Singapore	127	36	91	28.35%
South Korea	245	188	57	76.73%
Sri Lanka	46	0	46	0.00%
Syria	46	17	29	36.96%
Thailand	145	57	88	39.31%
United Arab Emirates	56	22	34	39.29%
Uzbekistan	45	17	28	37.78%
Vietnam	17	1	16	5.88%

== See also ==
- Basketball at the Summer Olympics
- Basketball at the Asian Games
- FIBA Basketball World Cup
- FIBA Asia Challenge
- FIBA Asia Under-20 Championship
- FIBA Asia Under-18 Championship
- FIBA Asia Under-16 Championship
- FIBA Women's Asia Cup
