= 1977 ABC Championship =

1977 FIBA Asia Cup
9th Asian Basketball Championship

Tournament details
- Host country: Malaysia
- Dates: November 28 – December 10
- Teams: 14
- Venue(s): 1 (in 1 host city)

Final positions
- Champions: China (2nd title)

The 1977 Asian Basketball Confederation Championship for Men were held in Kuala Lumpur, Malaysia.

== Preliminary round ==
=== Group A ===
Team	Pld	W	L	PF	PA	PD	Pts
China	4	4	0	432	193	+239	8
Iraq	4	3	1	279	298	−19	7
Thailand	4	2	2	286	335	−49	6
Singapore	4	1	3	273	314	−41	5
Bahrain	4	0	4	222	352	−130	4

November 28

China	106–33	Bahrain
Scoring by half: 19–23, 87–10

Stadium Negara, Kuala Lumpur

November 29

Thailand	85–74	Singapore
Scoring by half: 44–38, 41–36

Stadium Negara, Kuala Lumpur

November 29

Iraq	80–72	Bahrain
Scoring by half: 40–29, 40–43

Stadium Negara, Kuala Lumpur

November 30

Singapore	54–99	China
Scoring by half: 21–49, 33–50

Stadium Negara, Kuala Lumpur

November 30

Iraq	67–63	Thailand
Scoring by half: 31–38, 36–25

Stadium Negara, Kuala Lumpur

December 1

China	96–56	Iraq
Scoring by half: 37–23, 59–33

Stadium Negara, Kuala Lumpur

December 2

Thailand	50–131	China
Scoring by half: 26–54, 24–77

Stadium Negara, Kuala Lumpur

December 2

Bahrain	54–78	Singapore
Scoring by half: 31–34, 23–44

Stadium Negara, Kuala Lumpur

December 3

Iraq	76–67	Singapore
Scoring by half: 38–27, 38–40

Stadium Negara, Kuala Lumpur

December 3

Thailand	88–63	Bahrain
Scoring by half: 42–35, 46–28

Stadium Negara, Kuala Lumpur

=== Group B ===
Team	Pld	W	L	PF	PA	PD	Pts
Japan	4	4	0	391	228	+163	8
Philippines	4	3	1	408	284	+124	7
Pakistan	4	2	2	365	333	+32	6
Indonesia	4	1	3	277	410	−133	5
Sri Lanka	4	0	4	276	462	−186	4

November 29

Japan	118–57	Sri Lanka
Scoring by half: 65–33, 53–24

Stadium Negara, Kuala Lumpur

November 29

Philippines	103–87	Pakistan
Scoring by half: 50–41, 53–46

Stadium Negara, Kuala Lumpur

November 30

Indonesia	49–118	Japan
Scoring by half: 17–64, 32–54

Stadium Negara, Kuala Lumpur

November 30

Pakistan	128–71	Sri Lanka
Scoring by half: 59–39, 69–32

Stadium Negara, Kuala Lumpur

December 1

Sri Lanka	70–119	Philippines
Scoring by half: 26–58, 44–61

Stadium Negara, Kuala Lumpur

December 1

Pakistan	94–75	Indonesia
Scoring by half: 52–32, 42–43

Stadium Negara, Kuala Lumpur

December 2

Indonesia	97–78	Sri Lanka
Scoring by half: 47–41, 50–37

Stadium Negara, Kuala Lumpur

December 2

Japan	71–66	Philippines
Scoring by half: 31–31, 40–35

Stadium Negara, Kuala Lumpur

December 3

Philippines	120–56	Indonesia
Scoring by half: 68–32, 52–24

Stadium Negara, Kuala Lumpur

December 3

Japan	84–56	Pakistan
Scoring by half: 48–28, 36–28

Stadium Negara, Kuala Lumpur

=== Group C ===
Team	Pld	W	L	PF	PA	PD	Pts
South Korea	3	3	0	331	216	+115	6
Malaysia	3	2	1	304	252	+52	5
India	3	1	2	264	279	−15	4
Hong Kong	3	0	3	206	358	−152	3

November 28

Hong Kong	66–125	Malaysia
Scoring by half: 39–60, 27–65

Stadium Negara, Kuala Lumpur

November 29

South Korea	103–73	India
Scoring by half: 42–43, 61–30

Stadium Negara, Kuala Lumpur

November 30

India	86–98	Malaysia
Scoring by half: 38–46, 48–52

Stadium Negara, Kuala Lumpur

December 1

South Korea	128–62	Hong Kong
Scoring by half: 60–32, 68–30

Stadium Negara, Kuala Lumpur

December 2

South Korea	100–81	Malaysia
Scoring by half: 60–43, 40–38

Stadium Negara, Kuala Lumpur

December 3

India	105–78	Hong Kong
Scoring by half: 65–40, 40–38

Stadium Negara, Kuala Lumpur

== Final round ==
=== Classification 7th–14th ===
- The results and the points of the matches between the same teams that were already played during the preliminary round shall be taken into account for the classification round.

Team	Pld	W	L	PF	PA	PD	Pts	Tiebreaker
India	7	7	0	798	575	+223	14	
Thailand	7	6	1	635	509	+126	13	
Pakistan	7	4	3	629	565	+64	11	1–1 / 1.070
Hong Kong	7	4	3	533	575	−42	11	1–1 / 0.974
Singapore	7	4	3	603	557	+46	11	1–1 / 0.963
Bahrain	7	2	5	503	587	−84	9	
Indonesia	7	1	6	520	631	−111	8	
Sri Lanka	7	0	7	486	708	−222	7	

December 4

Indonesia	54–83	Thailand
Scoring by half: 36–42, 18–41

Stadium Negara, Kuala Lumpur

December 4

Pakistan	88–72	Bahrain
Scoring by half: 28–30, 60–42

Stadium Negara, Kuala Lumpur

December 4

Sri Lanka	78–114	India
Scoring by half: 45–51, 33–63

Stadium Negara, Kuala Lumpur

December 4

Singapore	78–86	Hong Kong
Scoring by half: 37–46, 41–40

Stadium Negara, Kuala Lumpur

December 6

Sri Lanka	59–73	Bahrain
Scoring by half: 33–34, 26–39

Stadium Negara, Kuala Lumpur

December 6

Hong Kong	93–77	Indonesia
Scoring by half: 42–36, 51–41

Stadium Negara, Kuala Lumpur

December 6

India	112–83	Singapore
Scoring by half: 58–41, 54–42

Stadium Negara, Kuala Lumpur

December 6

Pakistan	70–83	Thailand
Scoring by half: 45–40, 25–43

Stadium Negara, Kuala Lumpur

December 7

Bahrain	75–77	Hong Kong
Scoring by half: 42–39, 33–38

Stadium Negara, Kuala Lumpur

December 7

Thailand	117–66	Sri Lanka
Scoring by half: 61–26, 56–40

Stadium Negara, Kuala Lumpur

December 7

Indonesia	64–104	India
Scoring by half: 28–50, 36–54

Stadium Negara, Kuala Lumpur

December 7

Singapore	77–75	Pakistan
Scoring by half: 41–32, 36–43

Stadium Negara, Kuala Lumpur

December 8

Hong Kong	70–68	Sri Lanka
Scoring by half: 40–30, 30–38

Stadium Negara, Kuala Lumpur

December 8

Indonesia	79–104	Singapore
Scoring by half: 41–47, 38–57

Stadium Negara, Kuala Lumpur

December 8

India	119–85	Thailand
Scoring by half: 52–37, 67–48

Stadium Negara, Kuala Lumpur

December 9

Bahrain	75–74	Indonesia
Scoring by half: 42–40, 33–34

Stadium Negara, Kuala Lumpur

December 9

Sri Lanka	66–109	Singapore
Scoring by half: 33–53, 33–56

Stadium Negara, Kuala Lumpur

December 9

Thailand	94–63	Hong Kong
Scoring by half: 46–34, 48–29

Stadium Negara, Kuala Lumpur

December 9

Pakistan	96–121	India
Scoring by half: 49–60, 47–61

Stadium Negara, Kuala Lumpur

December 10

India	123–91	Bahrain
Scoring by half: 62–41, 61–50

Stadium Negara, Kuala Lumpur

December 10

Hong Kong	66–78	Pakistan
Scoring by half: 38–40, 28–38

Stadium Negara, Kuala Lumpur

=== Championship ===
Team	Pld	W	L	PF	PA	PD	Pts
China	5	5	0	605	385	+220	10
South Korea	5	4	1	538	437	+101	9
Japan	5	3	2	472	458	+14	8
Malaysia	5	2	3	462	527	−65	7
Philippines	5	1	4	454	545	−91	6
Iraq	5	0	5	404	583	−179	5

December 4

Philippines	60–117	China
Scoring by half: 27–54, 33–63

Stadium Negara, Kuala Lumpur

December 4

Iraq	76–97	Malaysia
Scoring by half: 44–51, 32–46

Stadium Negara, Kuala Lumpur

December 6

Japan	66–50	Iraq
Scoring by half: 25–24, 41–26

Stadium Negara, Kuala Lumpur

December 6

Malaysia	67–102	China
Scoring by half: 25–52, 42–50

Stadium Negara, Kuala Lumpur

December 6

South Korea	96–82	Philippines
Scoring by half: 44–39, 52–43

Stadium Negara, Kuala Lumpur

December 7

Iraq	69–114	South Korea
Scoring by half: 31–56, 38–58

Stadium Negara, Kuala Lumpur

December 7

Japan	83–71	Philippines
Scoring by half: 45–34, 38–37

Stadium Negara, Kuala Lumpur

December 8

China	119–63	Iraq
Scoring by half: 62–25, 57–38

Stadium Negara, Kuala Lumpur

December 8

Philippines	84–88	Malaysia
Scoring by half: 39–38, 45–50

Stadium Negara, Kuala Lumpur

December 8

South Korea	90–86 (OT)	Japan
Scoring by half: 45–36, 31–40 Overtime: 14–10

Stadium Negara, Kuala Lumpur

December 9

Malaysia	58–80	South Korea
Scoring by half: 33–38, 25–42

Stadium Negara, Kuala Lumpur

December 9

Iraq	90–91	Philippines
Scoring by half: 44–50, 46–41

Stadium Negara, Kuala Lumpur

December 9

China	110–81	Japan
Scoring by half: 55–34, 55–47

Stadium Negara, Kuala Lumpur

December 10

Japan	85–71	Malaysia
Scoring by half: 38–34, 47–37

Stadium Negara, Kuala Lumpur

December 10

South Korea	58–61	China
Scoring by half: 34–32, 24–29

Stadium Negara, Kuala Lumpur

== Final standings ==
Qualified for the 1978 FIBA World Championship

Rank	Team	Record
1st place, gold medalist(s)	China	9–0
2nd place, silver medalist(s)	South Korea	7–1
3rd place, bronze medalist(s)	Japan	7–2
4	Malaysia	4–4
5	Philippines	4–5
6	Iraq	3–6
7	India	7–2
8	Thailand	6–3
9	Pakistan	4–5
10	Hong Kong	4–5
11	Singapore	4–5
12	Bahrain	2–7
13	Indonesia	1–8
14	Sri Lanka	0–9

== Awards ==
1977 Asian champions

China
Second title
