= Pakistan Basketball Federation =

Pakistani sports governing body

- پاکستان باسکٹ بال فیڈریشن
- Sport: Basketball
- Jurisdiction: National
- Abbreviation: PBF
- Founded: February 1952; 74 years ago
- Affiliation: International Basketball Federation (FIBA)
- Affiliation date: 1958
- Regional affiliation: FIBA Asia
- Headquarters: YMCA Building, 16 The Mall, Lahore
- President: Iftikhar Mansoor
- Vice president: Imtiaz Rafi Butt
- Secretary: Khalid Bashir

Official website
- www.pbbf.com.pk
- (Pakistan)

The Pakistan Basketball Federation (PBF) is the national governing body responsible for the promotion and development of basketball in Pakistan. Established in 1952, the PBF oversees the sport's growth across the country. Brig. (R) M. Iftikhar Mansoor currently serves as the federation's president, having been elected on 24 January 2022, for a four-year term.

== History ==
=== Pre-Independence (1900–1947) ===
Basketball was introduced in Punjab by the early 1900s, with the YMCA leading the front in the promotion of the game. Gordon College, Rawalpindi was one of the first schools in the country which began playing the game in 1906, followed by CTI High School in Sialkot. Both of these institutes had a long history in training boys to play the game. The game might have come to Karachi about the same time. Forman Christian College, Lahore introduced the game in 1910.

Sometime during the 1910s, the YMCA began organizing the All-India Basketball Championship and carried it on until in the 1930s.

In the late 1920s, basketball one of the regular university sports in the region. The Punjab Olympic Association had its basketball sub-committee established and functioning in the late 1920s or early 1930s, and took the initiative of introducing the games in the Delhi Games in 1934. The game has been in every Olympics since, and the Punjab has won its share of these meets. Since 1947, basketball has been a part of all the National Games.

=== Post-Independence (1947–present) ===
At the time of partition in 1947, Dr. S.L. Sheets was the only office-bearer left in the Association, and only eight teams existed. The Karachi Amateur Basketball Association was formed a couple of years later, and that city became an important centre. In the early 1950s, the Services Sports Control Board adopted the international rules to replace the old ones and this had made possible the participation by Services teams with civilian teams at various centres. The game was favourite with PWR and the Police. The Inter-University Sports Board introduced basketball in its first Inter-Varsity Games inaugurated in 1953-54, with the first games held at Peshawar.

The Pakistan Amateur Basketball Federation was formally inaugurated in February 1952 and began functioning in early 1953.

==== Rival factions ====
The 2000s saw two factions emerge from within the PBF. In 2001, elections were held in Lahore to choose the next president of the federation. The incumbent president, air commodore Afzal Khan, contested against Brigadier Rashid Ali Malik. However, a dispute over the electoral list emerged, causing the Pakistan Sports Board (PSB) to hold the elections under its supervision. With the two groups tied at seven votes each, Khan was set to cast the deciding vote, but the Director General of PSB, Saulat Abbas, refused to let him do so, and instead, established an ad hoc administration. The sport suffered during this period, as hardly any national team was sent abroad for participation in international competitions.

On 4 October 2006, Muhammad Basharat Raja was unanimously elected as the president of PBF for four years after elections were held by the Pakistan Olympic Association (POA) on the orders of the Supreme Court of Pakistan. On 19 July 2010, the affiliated associations were invited to a meeting in Lahore to resolve all disputes. They, however, ended up electing a new basketball governing body under Malik. These elections were considered void by the official body as they were held without the presence of the PSB and POA representatives.

Further infighting continued with time, and the PSB supporting Malik's, and later, Asif Bajwa's faction. During this time, the POA had recognized Malik's faction.

==== Suspension ====
On 29 June 2013, FIBA suspended the membership of Pakistan Basketball Federation for its support of the unrecognized interim committee of the Pakistan Olympic Association. The main reason cited was the PBF President Asif Bajwa's leadership of the interim committee, which was viewed as being in defiance of the Olympic Charter. This interim setup, with the support of the Pakistan Sports Board, was organizing its own edition of the National Games at the time of suspension.

The suspension was lifted on 13 August 2015 after FIBA recognized the federation being run by Brig. Rashid Ali Malik

A goodwill tour of Pakistan men's national basketball team was arranged by Pakistan Basketball Federation in 2017.

== Affiliations ==
The Federation is affiliated with:

- International Basketball Federation (FIBA)
- FIBA Asia
- Pakistan Olympic Association

== See also ==
- Pakistan men's national basketball team
- Pakistan men's national under-18 basketball team
