= 1973 ABC Championship =

Season of Asian Basketball Nations

1973 FIBA Asia Cup
7th Asian Basketball Championship

Tournament details
- Host country: Philippines
- Dates: December 1–15
- Teams: 12 (from all Asian federations)
- Venue(s): 1 (in 1 host city)

Final positions
- Champions: Philippines (4th title)

Tournament statistics
- MVP: (Philippines) William Adornado

The 1973 Asian Basketball Confederation Championship for Men were held in Manila, Philippines.

== Preliminary round ==
=== Group A ===
Team	Pld	W	L	PF	PA	PD	Pts
South Korea	5	5	0	567	346	+221	10
Japan	5	4	1	452	319	+133	9
Iran	5	3	2	384	436	−52	8
Thailand	5	2	3	370	431	−61	7
Malaysia	5	1	4	386	469	−83	6
Hong Kong	5	0	5	373	531	−158	5

December 1

South Korea	126–68	Hong Kong
Scoring by half: 60–29, 66–39

Rizal Memorial Coliseum, Manila

December 1

Japan	91–62	Iran
Scoring by half: 42–30, 49–32

Rizal Memorial Coliseum, Manila

December 2

Hong Kong	83–106	Malaysia
Scoring by half: 36–48, 47–58

Rizal Memorial Coliseum, Manila

December 2

Thailand	74–100	South Korea
Scoring by half: 35–50, 39–50

Rizal Memorial Coliseum, Manila

December 3

Iran	83–64	Thailand
Scoring by half: 35–31, 48–33

Rizal Memorial Coliseum, Manila

December 3

Malaysia	52–83	Japan
Scoring by half: 30–47, 22–36

Rizal Memorial Coliseum, Manila

December 4

Japan	90–61	Thailand
Scoring by half: 46–28, 44–33

Rizal Memorial Coliseum, Manila

December 4

South Korea	116–54	Iran
Scoring by half: 57–36, 59–18

Rizal Memorial Coliseum, Manila

December 5

Hong Kong	56–109	Japan
Scoring by half: 26–58, 30–51

Rizal Memorial Coliseum, Manila

December 5

Malaysia	71–137	South Korea
Scoring by half: 31–76, 40–61

Rizal Memorial Coliseum, Manila

December 6

Iran	90–82	Malaysia
Scoring by half: 40–42, 50–40

Rizal Memorial Coliseum, Manila

December 6

Thailand	95–83	Hong Kong
Scoring by half: 50–48, 45–35

Rizal Memorial Coliseum, Manila

December 7

Malaysia	75–76	Thailand
Scoring by half: 38–43, 37–33

Rizal Memorial Coliseum, Manila

December 7

Japan	79–88	South Korea
Scoring by half: 39–35, 40–53

Rizal Memorial Coliseum, Manila

December 7

Iran	95–83	Hong Kong
Scoring by half: 50–43, 45–40

Rizal Memorial Coliseum, Manila

=== Group B ===
Team	Pld	W	L	PF	PA	PD	Pts
Philippines	5	5	0	568	335	+233	10
Taiwan	5	4	1	455	364	+91	9
India	5	3	2	375	413	−38	8
Indonesia	5	2	3	379	392	−13	7
Singapore	5	1	4	329	474	−145	6
Pakistan	5	0	5	334	462	−128	5

December 1

Indonesia	70–82	India
Scoring by half: 42–40, 28–42

Rizal Memorial Coliseum, Manila

December 1

Philippines	133–55	Pakistan
Scoring by half: 63–28, 70–27

Rizal Memorial Coliseum, Manila

December 2

India	63–99	Taiwan
Scoring by half: 31–56, 32–43

Rizal Memorial Coliseum, Manila

December 2

Singapore	52–88	Indonesia
Scoring by half: 27–42, 25–46

Rizal Memorial Coliseum, Manila

December 3

Singapore	87–77	Pakistan
Scoring by half: 35–37, 52–40

Rizal Memorial Coliseum, Manila

December 3

Philippines	109–73	India
Scoring by half: 45–36, 64–37

Rizal Memorial Coliseum, Manila

December 4

Indonesia	77–108	Philippines
Scoring by half: 43–55, 34–53

Rizal Memorial Coliseum, Manila

December 4

Taiwan	97–70	Singapore
Scoring by half: 49–31, 48–39

Rizal Memorial Coliseum, Manila

December 5

Pakistan	74–92	Taiwan
Scoring by half: 30–55, 44–37

Rizal Memorial Coliseum, Manila

December 5

Philippines	130–49	Singapore
Scoring by half: 55–15, 75–34

Rizal Memorial Coliseum, Manila

December 6

Taiwan	86–69	Indonesia
Scoring by half: 40–33, 46–36

Rizal Memorial Coliseum, Manila

December 6

Pakistan	64–75	India
Scoring by half: 40–36, 24–39

Rizal Memorial Coliseum, Manila

December 7

India	82–71	Singapore
Scoring by half: 51–33, 31–38

Rizal Memorial Coliseum, Manila

December 7

Pakistan	64–75	Indonesia
Scoring by half: 40–36, 24–39

Rizal Memorial Coliseum, Manila

December 7

Taiwan	81–88	Philippines
Scoring by half: 39–43, 42–45

Rizal Memorial Coliseum, Manila

== Final round ==
=== Classification 7th–12th ===
Team	Pld	W	L	PF	PA	PD	Pts	Tiebreaker
Thailand	5	4	1	482	380	+102	9	1–0
Indonesia	5	4	1	464	415	+49	9	0–1
Malaysia	5	2	3	435	450	−15	7	2–0
Singapore	5	2	3	398	456	−58	7	1–1
Hong Kong	5	2	3	417	441	−24	7	0–2
Pakistan	5	1	4	401	455	−54	6	

December 9

Thailand	102–64	Singapore
Scoring by half: 48–38, 54–26

Rizal Memorial Coliseum, Manila

December 9

Indonesia	80–78	Hong Kong
Scoring by half: 36–41, 44–37

Rizal Memorial Coliseum, Manila

December 9

Malaysia	86–98	Pakistan
Scoring by half: 41–48, 45–50

Rizal Memorial Coliseum, Manila

December 10

Thailand	83–84	Hong Kong
Scoring by half: 43–42, 40–42

Rizal Memorial Coliseum, Manila

December 10

Pakistan	79–95	Singapore
Scoring by half: 42–48, 37–47

Rizal Memorial Coliseum, Manila

December 11

Malaysia	84–93	Indonesia
Scoring by half: 45–40, 39–53

Rizal Memorial Coliseum, Manila

December 11

Thailand	90–70	Pakistan
Scoring by half: 42–34, 48–36

Rizal Memorial Coliseum, Manila

December 12

Malaysia	108–82	Hong Kong
Scoring by half: 51–46, 57–36

Rizal Memorial Coliseum, Manila

December 12

Singapore	78–102	Indonesia
Scoring by half: 42–48, 36–54

Rizal Memorial Coliseum, Manila

December 13

Malaysia	68–102	Thailand
Scoring by half: 36–50, 32–52

Rizal Memorial Coliseum, Manila

December 13

Hong Kong	89–84	Pakistan
Scoring by half: 43–46, 46–38

Rizal Memorial Coliseum, Manila

December 14

Indonesia	95–70	Pakistan
Scoring by half: 55–37, 40–33

Rizal Memorial Coliseum, Manila

December 14

Hong Kong	84–86	Singapore
Scoring by half: 40–42, 44–44

Rizal Memorial Coliseum, Manila

December 15

Malaysia	89–75	Singapore
Scoring by half: 45–32, 44–43

Rizal Memorial Coliseum, Manila

December 15

Indonesia	94–105	Thailand
Scoring by half: 54–45, 40–60

Rizal Memorial Coliseum, Manila

=== Championship ===
Team	Pld	W	L	PF	PA	PD	Pts
Philippines	5	5	0	478	374	+104	10
South Korea	5	4	1	465	400	+65	9
Taiwan	5	3	2	394	388	+6	8
Japan	5	2	3	403	409	−6	7
Iran	5	1	4	414	463	−49	6
India	5	0	5	369	489	−120	5

December 9

Japan	90–73	India
Scoring by half: 38–30, 52–43

Rizal Memorial Coliseum, Manila

December 9

Philippines	88–80	Iran
Scoring by half: 49–43, 39–37

Rizal Memorial Coliseum, Manila

December 9

South Korea	81–75	Taiwan
Scoring by half: 39–34, 42–41

Rizal Memorial Coliseum, Manila

December 10

Taiwan	89–63	India
Scoring by half: 45–25, 44–38

Rizal Memorial Coliseum, Manila

December 10

Japan	98–83	Iran
Scoring by half: 58–39, 40–44

Rizal Memorial Coliseum, Manila

December 11

South Korea	113–67	India
Scoring by half: 49–25, 64–42

Rizal Memorial Coliseum, Manila

December 11

Japan	68–89	Philippines
Scoring by half: 34–41, 34–48

Rizal Memorial Coliseum, Manila

December 12

Iran	90–105	South Korea
Scoring by half: 40–51, 50–54

Rizal Memorial Coliseum, Manila

December 12

Philippines	101–64	Taiwan
Scoring by half: 39–34, 62–30

Rizal Memorial Coliseum, Manila

December 13

Iran	87–82	India
Scoring by half: 42–45, 45–37

Rizal Memorial Coliseum, Manila

December 13

South Korea	88–78	Japan
Scoring by half: 45–48, 43–30

Rizal Memorial Coliseum, Manila

December 14

Philippines	110–84	India
Scoring by half: 57–47, 53–37

Rizal Memorial Coliseum, Manila

December 14

Japan	69–76	Taiwan
Scoring by half: 38–45, 31–31

Rizal Memorial Coliseum, Manila

December 15

Taiwan	90–74	Iran
Scoring by half: 48–38, 42–36

Rizal Memorial Coliseum, Manila

December 15

Philippines	90–78	South Korea
Scoring by half: 48–48, 42–30

Rizal Memorial Coliseum, Manila

== Final standings ==
Qualified for the 1974 FIBA World Championship

Rank	Team	Record
1st place, gold medalist(s)	Philippines	10–0
2nd place, silver medalist(s)	South Korea	9–1
3rd place, bronze medalist(s)	Taiwan	7–3
4	Japan	6–4
5	Iran	4–6
6	India	3–7
7	Thailand	6–4
8	Indonesia	6–4
9	Malaysia	3–7
10	Singapore	3–7
11	Hong Kong	2–8
12	Pakistan	1–9

== Awards ==
1973 Asian champions

Philippines
Fourth title
