= Pakistan men's national basketball team =

Pakistan
- FIBA ranking: NR (13 July 2026)
- Joined FIBA: 1958
- FIBA zone: FIBA Asia
- National federation: Pakistan Basketball Federation
- Nickname: The Greenshirts

Olympic Games
- Appearances: None

FIBA World Cup
- Appearances: None

FIBA Asia Cup
- Appearances: 10
- Medals: None

South Asian Games
- Appearances: 4
- Medals: (silver) (1995, 1999, 2004)
Home	Away

Former logo of the Pakistan Basketball Federation

The Pakistan National Basketball Team (Urdu: پاکستان باسکٹ بال) is the basketball team representing Pakistan in international competitions, organised and run by the Pakistan Basketball Federation.

Its biggest success came at the Asian Championship in 1979 where Team Pakistan surprisingly finished 6th, ahead of teams such as Team Iran, which did not qualify for the event and Team Malaysia. In the last decades, Pakistan has been a force at the regional stage as the team won the silver medal at the 2013 SABA Championship and three silver medals at the South Asian Games.

== Competitions ==
=== Summer Olympics ===
yet to qualify

=== World championships ===
yet to qualify

=== FIBA Asia Cup ===
Year	Position	Pld	W	L
(Philippines) 1960	Did not enter			
(Taiwan) 1963	Did not enter			
(Malaysia) 1965	Did not enter			
(South Korea) 1967	Did not enter			
(Thailand) 1969	8th place	8	1	7
(Japan) 1971	Did not enter			
(Philippines) 1973	12th place	10	1	9
(Thailand) 1975	11th place	9	2	7
(Malaysia) 1977	9th place	9	4	5
(Japan) 1979	6th place	8	3	5
(India) 1981	9th place	7	3	4
(Hong Kong) 1983	13th place	5	2	3
(Malaysia) 1985	14th place	5	1	4
(Thailand) 1987	Did not enter			
(China) 1989	10th place	7	3	4
(Japan) 1991	Did not enter			
(Indonesia) 1993	17th place	5	1	4
(South Korea) 1995	Did not enter			
(Saudi Arabia) 1997	Did not enter			
(Japan) 1999	Did not enter			
(China) 2001	Did not enter			
(China) 2003	Did not enter			
(Qatar) 2005	Did not enter			
(Japan) 2007	Did not enter			
(China) 2009	Did not enter			
(China) 2011	Did not enter			
(Philippines) 2013	Did not enter			
(China) 2015	Did not enter			
(Lebanon) 2017	Did not enter			
(Indonesia) 2022	Did not enter			
(Saudi Arabia) 2025	Did not enter			
2029	Did not enter			
Total	10/32	73	21	52

=== South Asian Games ===
- 1995 : (silver)
- 1999 : (silver)
- 2004 : (silver)
- 2016 : Won 2 exhibition matches

=== SABA Championship ===
- 2002 : Did Not Participate
- 2013 : (silver)
- 2014 : Did Not Participate
- 2015 : Did Not Participate

== Head coach position ==
- (Pakistan) Masudur Rahman - 1962
- (Pakistan) M. Amin Butt - 1984
- (Pakistan) M. Riaz Malik - 1997
- (Pakistan) Abdul Ghafoor – 2010
- (Pakistan) Agha Arshed Ali – 2016
- (Pakistan) M. Riaz Malik – 2017

== See also ==
- Pakistan Basketball Federation
- Pakistan national under-19 basketball team
