= 1975 ABC Championship =

1975 FIBA Asia Cup
8th Asian Basketball Championship

Tournament details
- Host country: Thailand
- Dates: November 15–26
- Teams: 13 (from all Asian federations)
- Venue: 1 (in 1 host city)

Final positions
- Champions: China (1st title)

The 1975 Asian Basketball Confederation Championship for Men were held in Bangkok, Thailand. This was the first time that the Chinese national team participated in the tournament, as Taiwan previously competed instead of China. However, China dominated the competition with a perfect record, with no team even coming close to beating them.

== Preliminary round ==
=== Group A ===
Team	Pld	W	L	PF	PA	PD	Pts
China	6	6	0	621	417	+204	12
Philippines	6	5	1	622	526	+96	11
Thailand	6	4	2	535	488	+47	10
Singapore	6	3	3	502	560	−58	9
Hong Kong	6	2	4	507	580	−73	8
Indonesia	6	1	5	460	588	−128	7
Pakistan	6	0	6	440	528	−88	6

November 15

Thailand	94–76	Hong Kong
Scoring by half: 44–40, 50–36

Bangkok

November 15

Philippines	97–72	Singapore
Scoring by half: 47–44, 50–28

Bangkok

November 15

Indonesia	74–67	Pakistan
Scoring by half: 37–22, 37–45

Bangkok

November 16

Hong Kong	87–76	Indonesia
Scoring by half: 35–38, 52–38

Bangkok

November 16

Pakistan	64–94	China
Scoring by half: 28–47, 36–47

Bangkok

November 16

Singapore	83–99	Thailand
Scoring by half: 47–50, 36–49

Bangkok

November 17

Indonesia	87–117	Philippines
Scoring by half: 35–57, 52–60

Bangkok

November 17

Thailand	87–69	Pakistan
Scoring by half: 37–25, 50–44

Bangkok

November 17

China	109–64	Singapore
Scoring by half: 51–35, 58–29

Bangkok

November 18

Singapore	104–87	Indonesia
Scoring by half: 48–36, 56–51

Bangkok

November 18

Pakistan	75–82	Hong Kong
Scoring by half: 44–40, 31–42

Bangkok

November 18

Philippines	85–105	China
Scoring by half: 44–50, 41–55

Bangkok

November 19

Hong Kong	89–93	Singapore
Scoring by half: 45–53, 44–40

Bangkok

November 19

China	108–57	Indonesia
Scoring by half: 43–29, 65–28

Bangkok

November 19

Thailand	88–96	Philippines
Scoring by half: 55–49, 33–47

Bangkok

November 20

Philippines	105–86	Pakistan
Scoring by half: 52–50, 53–36

Bangkok

November 20

China	120–85	Hong Kong
Scoring by half: 59–45, 61–40

Bangkok

November 20

Indonesia	79–105	Thailand
Scoring by half: 37–52, 42–53

Bangkok

November 21

Pakistan	79–86	Singapore
Scoring by half: 37–52, 42–34

Bangkok

November 21

Hong Kong	88–122	Philippines
Scoring by half: 42–64, 46–58

Bangkok

November 21

Thailand	62–85	China
Scoring by half: 32–41, 30–44

Bangkok

=== Group B ===
Team	Pld	W	L	PF	PA	PD	Pts
Japan	5	5	0	566	380	+186	10
South Korea	5	4	1	634	340	+294	9
India	5	3	2	477	474	+3	8
Malaysia	5	2	3	479	523	−44	7
Kuwait	5	1	4	399	517	−118	6
Sri Lanka	5	0	5	351	672	−321	5

November 15

South Korea	124–68	Kuwait
Scoring by half: 59–33, 65–35

Bangkok

November 15

Japan	117–77	Malaysia
Scoring by half: 54–33, 63–44

Bangkok

November 16

Malaysia	144–94	Sri Lanka
Scoring by half: 73–45, 71–49

Bangkok

November 16

India	61–126	South Korea
Scoring by half: 26–65, 35–61

Bangkok

November 17

Sri Lanka	82–103	Kuwait
Scoring by half: 41–52, 41–51

Bangkok

November 17

Japan	99–81	India
Scoring by half: 45–40, 54–41

Bangkok

November 18

Sri Lanka	54–126	Japan
Scoring by half: 20–63, 34–63

Bangkok

November 18

India	90–78	Kuwait
Scoring by half: 42–35, 48–43

Bangkok

November 19

South Korea	119–69	Malaysia
Scoring by half: 67–36, 52–33

Bangkok

November 19

Japan	118–66	Kuwait
Scoring by half: 52–29, 66–37

Bangkok

November 20

Malaysia	86–109	India
Scoring by half: 38–53, 48–56

Bangkok

November 20

Sri Lanka	36–163	South Korea
Scoring by half: 14–77, 22–86

Bangkok

November 21

India	136–85	Sri Lanka
Scoring by half: 70–35, 66–50

Bangkok

November 21

Kuwait	84–103	Malaysia
Scoring by half: 39–50, 45–53

Bangkok

November 21

South Korea	102–106	Japan
Scoring by half: 56–53, 46–53

Bangkok

== Final round ==
- The results and the points of the matches between the same teams that were already played during the preliminary round shall be taken into account for the final round.

=== Classification 7th–13th ===
Team	Pld	W	L	PF	PA	PD	Pts	Tiebreaker
Singapore	6	6	0	546	474	+72	12	
Malaysia	6	5	1	612	508	+104	11	
Hong Kong	6	4	2	544	506	+38	10	
Indonesia	6	2	4	498	502	−4	8	1–1 / 1.007
Pakistan	6	2	4	508	525	−17	8	1–1 / 1.006
Kuwait	6	2	4	468	501	−33	8	1–1 / 0.987
Sri Lanka	6	0	6	474	634	−160	6	

November 23

Indonesia	81–73	Sri Lanka
Scoring by half: 48–39, 33–34

Bangkok

November 23

Pakistan	84–101	Malaysia
Scoring by half: 48–46, 36–55

Bangkok

November 23

Hong Kong	92–89	Kuwait
Scoring by half: 47–39, 45–50

Bangkok

November 24

Malaysia	98–84	Indonesia
Scoring by half: 48–35, 50–49

Bangkok

November 24

Sri Lanka	74–100	Pakistan
Scoring by half: 42–47, 32–53

Bangkok

November 24

Kuwait	75–89	Singapore
Scoring by half: 39–40, 36–49

Bangkok

November 25

Hong Kong	111–81	Sri Lanka
Scoring by half: 53–46, 58–35

Bangkok

November 25

Pakistan	93–85	Kuwait
Scoring by half: 37–40, 56–45

Bangkok

November 25

Singapore	79–74	Malaysia
Scoring by half: 44–32, 35–42

Bangkok

November 26

Kuwait	72–66	Indonesia
Scoring by half: 37–32, 35–34

Bangkok

November 26

Sri Lanka	70–95	Singapore
Scoring by half: 32–51, 38–44

Bangkok

November 26

Malaysia	92–83	Hong Kong
Scoring by half: 51–40, 41–43

Bangkok

=== Championship ===
Team	Pld	W	L	PF	PA	PD	Pts
China	5	5	0	478	365	+113	10
Japan	5	4	1	446	412	+34	9
South Korea	5	3	2	539	405	+134	8
India	5	2	3	419	479	−60	7
Philippines	5	1	4	409	527	−118	6
Thailand	5	0	5	355	458	−103	5

November 23

China	111–81	India
Scoring by half: 55–44, 56–37

Bangkok

November 23

Thailand	64–82	Japan
Scoring by half: 24–41, 40–41

Bangkok

November 24

Japan	100–85	Philippines
Scoring by half: 50–47, 50–38

Bangkok

November 24

South Korea	78–97	China
Scoring by half: 42–58, 36–39

Bangkok

November 25

Thailand	67–112	South Korea
Scoring by half: 38–65, 29–47

Bangkok

November 25

Philippines	69–113	India
Scoring by half: 30–59, 39–54

Bangkok

November 26

South Korea	121–74	Philippines
Scoring by half: 61–34, 60–40

Bangkok

November 26

China	80–59	Japan
Scoring by half: 38–28, 42–31

Bangkok

November 26

India	83–74	Thailand
Scoring by half: 61–34, 22–40

Bangkok

== Final standings ==
Qualified for the 1976 Summer Olympics

Rank	Team	Record
1st place, gold medalist(s)	China	9–0
2nd place, silver medalist(s)	Japan	7–1
3rd place, bronze medalist(s)	South Korea	6–2
4	India	5–3
5	Philippines	5–4
6	Thailand	4–5
7	Singapore	6–3
8	Malaysia	5–4
9	Hong Kong	4–5
10	Indonesia	2–7
11	Pakistan	2–7
12	Kuwait	2–7
13	Sri Lanka	0–9

== Awards ==
1975 Asian champions

China
First title
