= 1969 ABC Championship =

1969 FIBA Asia Cup
5th Asian Basketball Championship

Tournament details
- Host country: Thailand
- Dates: November 18–29
- Teams: 9 (from all Asian confederations)
- Venue(s): 1 (in 1 host city)

Final positions
- Champions: South Korea (1st title)

The 1969 Asian Basketball Confederation Championship for Men was held in Bangkok, Thailand. Ten Asian teams participated in the competition but Laos played under special invitation and the games did not count in the championship standings.

== Results ==
Team	Pld	W	L	PF	PA	PD	Pts	Tiebreaker
South Korea	8	8	0	779	510	+269	16	
Japan	8	7	1	702	506	+196	15	
Philippines	8	6	2	786	619	+167	14	
Taiwan	8	4	4	628	621	+7	12	1–0
India	8	4	4	748	720	+28	12	0–1
Thailand	8	3	5	628	632	−4	11	1–0
Malaysia	8	3	5	626	687	−61	11	0–1
Pakistan	8	1	7	544	826	−282	9	
Hong Kong	8	0	8	463	783	−320	8	

November 18

Thailand	82–63	Hong Kong
Scoring by half: 39–38, 43–25

Bangkok

November 18

South Korea	90–72	Malaysia
Scoring by half: 48–30, 42–42

Bangkok

November 19

Japan	123–54	Pakistan
Scoring by half: 54–37, 69–17

Bangkok

November 19

India	85–106	Philippines
Scoring by half: 42–43, 43–63

Bangkok

November 20

Malaysia	53–87	Japan
Scoring by half: 27–36, 26–51

Bangkok

November 20

Thailand	113–76	Pakistan
Scoring by half: 51–36, 62–40

Bangkok

November 20

India	83–84	Taiwan
Scoring by half: 39–41, 44–43

Bangkok

November 20

Hong Kong	38–112	South Korea
Scoring by half: 25–58, 13–54

Bangkok

November 21

South Korea	115–49	Pakistan
Scoring by half: 61–21, 54–28

Bangkok

November 21

Hong Kong	38–120	Japan
Scoring by half: 12–54, 26–66

Bangkok

November 21

Thailand	81–63	Malaysia
Scoring by half: 37–36, 44–27

Bangkok

November 21

Philippines	97–78	Taiwan
Scoring by half: 49–38, 48–40

Bangkok

November 22

Philippines	113–73	Hong Kong
Scoring by half: 57–35, 56–38

Bangkok

November 22

Malaysia	102–114	India
Scoring by half: 46–50, 56–64

Bangkok

November 23

South Korea	94–69	Taiwan
Scoring by half: 42–26, 52–43

Bangkok

November 23

Thailand	74–76	Japan
Scoring by half: 46–33, 28–43

Bangkok

November 24

Taiwan	105–72	Pakistan
Scoring by half: 56–33, 49–39

Bangkok

November 24

Hong Kong	58–89	Malaysia
Scoring by half: 22–38, 36–51

Bangkok

November 24

South Korea	105–78	India
Scoring by half: 44–40, 61–38

Bangkok

November 24

Japan	78–77	Philippines
Scoring by half: 35–42, 43–35

Bangkok

November 25

Taiwan	88–57	Hong Kong
Scoring by half: 40–26, 48–31

Bangkok

November 25

Japan	83–74	India
Scoring by half: 39–32, 44–42

Bangkok

November 25

Pakistan	84–102	Malaysia
Scoring by half: 39–42, 45–60

Bangkok

November 25

Philippines	89–73	Thailand
Scoring by half: 45–36, 44–37

Bangkok

November 26

Pakistan	76–121	Philippines
Scoring by half: 29–58, 47–63

Bangkok

November 26

Hong Kong	87–111	India
Scoring by half: 33–45, 54–66

Bangkok

November 26

Taiwan	67–65	Thailand
Scoring by half: 34–28, 33–37

Bangkok

November 26

South Korea	75–66	Japan
Scoring by half: 32–29, 43–37

Bangkok

November 27

India	98–65	Pakistan
Scoring by half: 42–33, 56–32

Bangkok

November 27

Malaysia	61–97	Philippines
Scoring by half: 31–43, 30–54

Bangkok

November 28

Thailand	52–93	South Korea
Scoring by half: 29–44, 23–49

Bangkok

November 28

Japan	69–61	Taiwan
Scoring by half: 30–26, 39–35

Bangkok

November 29

Pakistan	68–49	Hong Kong
Scoring by half: 25–22, 43–27

Bangkok

November 29

Taiwan	76–84	Malaysia
Scoring by half: 42–38, 34–46

Bangkok

November 29

India	105–88	Thailand
Scoring by half: 49–48, 56–40

Bangkok

November 29

Philippines	86–95	South Korea
Scoring by half: 47–47, 39–48

Bangkok

== Final standings ==
Qualified for the 1970 FIBA World Championship

Rank	Team	Record
1st place, gold medalist(s)	South Korea	8–0
2nd place, silver medalist(s)	Japan	7–1
3rd place, bronze medalist(s)	Philippines	6–2
4	Taiwan	4–4
5	India	4–4
6	Thailand	3–5
7	Malaysia	3–5
8	Pakistan	1–7
9	Hong Kong	0–8

== Awards ==
1969 Asian champions

South Korea
First title
