= Thailand men's national basketball team =

Thailand
- FIBA ranking: 94 ▲3 (1 September 2026)
- Joined FIBA: 1953
- FIBA zone: FIBA Asia
- National federation: BSAT (Thailand)
- Coach: Pachakorn Lertlaokul

Olympic Games
- Appearances: 1 (1956)
- Medals: None

FIBA Asia Cup
- Appearances: 18
- Medals: None
Home	Away

First international
- Formosa 73–46 Thailand (Manila, Philippines; 2 May 1954)

Biggest win
- Thailand 129–56 Cambodia (Surabaya, Indonesia; 25 November 1996)

Biggest defeat
- China 121–46 Thailand (Shanghai, China; 20 July 2001)

The Thailand men's national basketball team represents Thailand in international basketball. They are controlled by the Basketball Sport Association of Thailand.

== Competitive record ==
Former logo of the BSAT

=== Olympic Games ===
Year	Position	Tournament	Host
1956	15	Basketball at the 1956 Summer Olympics	Melbourne, Australia

=== FIBA Asia Cup ===
Year	Position	Pld	W	L
(Philippines) 1960	did not enter			
(Taiwan) 1963	4th place	11	5	6
(Malaysia) 1965	4th place	9	4	5
(South Korea) 1967	7th place	9	3	6
(Thailand) 1969	6th place	8	3	5
(Japan) 1971	7th place	8	2	6
(Philippines) 1973	7th place	10	6	4
(Thailand) 1975	6th place	9	4	5
(Malaysia) 1977	8th place	9	6	3
(Japan) 1979	9th place	8	4	4
(India) 1981	7th place	7	5	2
(Hong Kong) 1983	10th place	6	3	3
(Malaysia) 1985	7th place	5	2	3
(Thailand) 1987	8th place	8	2	6
(China) 1989	12th place	6	1	5
(Japan) 1991	did not enter			
(Indonesia) 1993	15th place	7	3	4
(South Korea) 1995	16th place	8	1	7
(Saudi Arabia) 1997	did not enter			
(Japan) 1999	14th place	6	1	5
(China) 2001	13th place	6	1	5
(China) 2003	did not qualify			
(Qatar) 2005	did not qualify			
(Japan) 2007	did not qualify			
(China) 2009	did not enter			
(China) 2011	did not enter			
(Philippines) 2013	14th place	5	1	4
(China) 2015	did not enter			
(Lebanon) 2017	did not qualify			
(Indonesia) 2022	did not qualify			
(Saudi Arabia) 2025	did not qualify			
2029	To be determined			
Total	19/31	145	57	88

=== SEA Games ===
- 1977 : (bronze)
- 1979 : ?
- 1981 : (bronze)
- 1983 : (bronze)
- 1985 : (bronze)
- 1987 : (bronze)
- 1989 : (bronze)
- 1991 : (silver)
- 1993 : (silver)
- 1995 : (silver)
- 1997 : (bronze)
- 1999 : (silver)
- 2001 : 4th
- 2003 : (silver)
- 2007 : 4th
- 2011 : (silver)
- 2013 : (silver)
- 2015 : 4th
- 2017 : (bronze)
- 2019 : (silver)
- 2021 : (bronze)
- 2023 : (bronze)
- 2025 : (silver)

=== Southeast Asian Championship ===
- 1994 : (silver)
- 1996 : (bronze) or 4th (result unknown)
- 1998 : (silver)
- 2001 : (silver)
- 2003 : (bronze)
- 2005 : (bronze)
- 2007 : 4th
- 2009 : did not participate
- 2011 : did not participate
- 2013 : (gold)
- 2015 : did not participate
- 2017 : (bronze)

== Current roster ==
Thailand National Basketball Team - FIBA Asia Cup 2025 Pre-Qualifiers roster
Players
Coaches

Pos.	No.	Name	Age – Date of birth	Height	Club	Ctr.
F	1	Nicola Franco	19 – 5 July 2003	1.96 m (6 ft 5 in)	Chulalongkorn University	(Thailand)
G	3	Frederick Jones Lish	34 – 18 August 1988	1.74 m (5 ft 9 in)	Zavkhan Brothers	(Mongolia)
SG	7	Jittaphon Towaroj	31 – 7 August 1991	1.83 m (6 ft 0 in)	Banvas Black Bulls Basketball Club	(Thailand)
SF	11	Moses Morgan	30 – 14 March 1992	1.96 m (6 ft 5 in)	Hi-Tech Bangkok City	(Thailand)
F	14	Naratip Boonserm	27 – 20 September 1995	1.93 m (6 ft 4 in)	Banvas Black Bulls Basketball Club	(Thailand)
SG	18	Nakorn Jaisanuk	31 – 18 November 1991	1.90 m (6 ft 3 in)	Hi-Tech Basketball Club	(Thailand)
G	24	Manatsawee Booddoung	26 – 28 November 1996	1.77 m (5 ft 10 in)	Hi-Tech Bangkok City	(Thailand)
C	25	Anasawee Klaewnarong	29 – 22 November 1993	1.99 m (6 ft 6 in)	Hi-Tech Bangkok City	(Thailand)
PG	27	Nattakarn Muangboon	31 – 27 March 1991	1.79 m (5 ft 10 in)	Hi-Tech Basketball Club	(Thailand)
PF	38	Arnat Puangla	26 – 16 July 1996	1.93 m (6 ft 4 in)	Banvas Black Bulls Basketball Club	(Thailand)
C	65	Teerawat Chanthachon	27 – 23 April 1995	1.98 m (6 ft 6 in)	Banvas Black Bulls Basketball Club	(Thailand)
G	99	Kannut Samerjai	34 – 17 October 1988	1.79 m (5 ft 10 in)	Banvas Black Bulls Basketball Club	(Thailand)

Head coach

- (Spain) Edu Torres

Assistant coach(es)

- (Thailand) B. Pirune
- (Thailand) G. Letmalaiporn

Legend

- (C) Team captain
- Club field describes current pro club

== Past rosters ==
Roster in 2011:

Thailand National Basketball Team roster
Players
Coaches

Pos.	No.	Name	Age – Date of birth	Height	Club	Ctr.
PG	4	Darongpan Apiromvilaichai	27 – 1 January 1985	1.85 m (6 ft 1 in)	Chang Thailand Slammers	(Thailand)
G	5	Mana Jantuma	31 – 27 July 1980	1.85 m (6 ft 1 in)	Chang Thailand Slammers	(Thailand)
	6	Danai Kongkum	–		Bangkok Cobras	(Thailand)
	7	Wutipong Dasom	–
SF	8	Sangthong Supachai	–	1.85 m (6 ft 1 in)	Chang Thailand Slammers	(Thailand)
G	9	Darunpong Apiromvilaichai	–	1.85 m (6 ft 1 in)	Bangkok Cobras	(Thailand)
G/F	10	Attaporn Lertmalaiporn	–	2.01 m (6 ft 7 in)	Chang Thailand Slammers	(Thailand)
	11	Boonchai Rittiphanyawong	–
G/F	12	Ratdech Kruatiwa	26 – 18 May 1985	1.91 m (6 ft 3 in)	Bangkok Cobras	(Thailand)
F	13	Chanachon Klahan	28 – 1 January 1984	1.90 m (6 ft 3 in)	Bangkok Cobras	(Thailand)
C	14	Chaiwat Kaedum	28 – 22 March 1983	1.95 m (6 ft 5 in)	Bangkok Cobras	(Thailand)
PF	15	Sukhdavb Ghogar	–	2.01 m (6 ft 7 in)	Chang Thailand Slammers	(Thailand)

Head coach

- (Thailand) Manu Niyomy Indee

Assistant coach(es)

- ?

Legend

- (C) Team captain
- Club field describes current pro club

Roster at the 2013 FIBA Asia Championship.

Thailand National Basketball Team roster
Players
Coaches

Pos.	No.	Name	Age – Date of birth	Height	Club	Ctr.
F	4	Chanachon Klahan	29 – 3 February 1984	1.88 m (6 ft 2 in)	Thailand Slammers	(Thailand)
C	5	Attaporn Lertmalaiporn	30 – 2 May 1983	1.93 m (6 ft 4 in)	Thailand Slammers	(Thailand)
G	6	Suttisin Wattana	28 – 23 January 1985	1.82 m (6 ft 0 in)	Thailand Slammers	(Thailand)
F	7	Danai Kongkum	28 – 25 January 1985	1.90 m (6 ft 3 in)	Thailand Slammers	(Thailand)
C	8	Wutipong Dasom	22 – 20 January 1991	1.95 m (6 ft 5 in)	Thailand Slammers	(Thailand)
C	9	Anasawee Klaewnarong	19 – 22 November 1993	1.99 m (6 ft 6 in)
G	10	Darongpan Apiromvilaichai	28 – 4 March 1985	1.85 m (6 ft 1 in)	Thailand Slammers	(Thailand)
G	11	Darunpong Apiromvilaichai	28 – 4 March 1985	1.84 m (6 ft 0 in)	Bangkok Cobras	(Thailand)
F/C	12	Sukhdave Ghogar	23 – 1 August 1990	1.95 m (6 ft 5 in)	Thailand Slammers	(Thailand)
G	13	Kannawat Lertlaokul	26 – 29 June 1987	1.70 m (5 ft 7 in)	Thailand Slammers	(Thailand)
G	14	Kannut Samerjai	24 – 17 October 1988	1.79 m (5 ft 10 in)	Thailand Slammers	(Thailand)
G/F	15	Wacharapong Tongsri	28 – 12 February 1985	1.78 m (5 ft 10 in)	Thailand Slammers	(Thailand)

Head coach

- (Thailand) Manid Niyomyinde

Assistant coach(es)

- (Thailand) Jakravarn Booranajan

Legend

- (C) Team captain
- Club field describes current pro club

Roster at the 2016 FIBA Asia Challenge.

Thailand National Basketball Team roster
Players
Coaches

Pos.	No.	Name	Age – Date of birth	Height	Club	Ctr.
G	6	Sorot Sunthonsiri	23 – 11 February 1993	1.81 m (5 ft 11 in)	Mono Vampire	(Thailand)
G	7	Jittaphon Towaroj	24 – 7 August 1991	1.82 m (6 ft 0 in)	Mono Vampire	(Thailand)
F	8	Nakorn Jaisanuk	24 – 18 November 1991	1.90 m (6 ft 3 in)	Hi-Tech Bangkok City	(Thailand)
F/C	10	Anucha Langsui	22 – 19 December 1993	1.98 m (6 ft 6 in)	Madgoat	(Thailand)
F	73	Wutipong Dasom	25 – 20 January 1991	1.95 m (6 ft 5 in)	Hi-Tech Bangkok City	(Thailand)
G/F	18	Guntapong Korsah-Dick	18 – 7 November 1997	1.83 m (6 ft 0 in)		(Thailand)
G	27	Nattakarn Muangboon	25 – 27 March 1991	1.79 m (5 ft 10 in)	Mono Tiewphaignam	(Thailand)
C	31	Chanatip Jakrawan	19 – 10 January 1997	1.97 m (6 ft 6 in)	TGE	(Thailand)
F/C	15	Sukhdave Ghogar	26 – 1 August 1990	1.95 m (6 ft 5 in)	Hi-Tech Bangkok City	(Thailand)
C	36	Patiphan Klahan	23 – 29 June 1993	2.00 m (6 ft 7 in)	Hi-Tech Bangkok City	(Thailand)
F	45	Peeranat Semmesuk	21 – 26 May 1995	1.95 m (6 ft 5 in)	Mono Vampire	(Thailand)
F	65	Teerawat Chanthachon	21 – 23 April 1995	1.91 m (6 ft 3 in)	Mono Vampire	(Thailand)

Head coach

- (England) Tim Lewis

Assistant coach

- (Thailand) Piyapong Piroon

Legend

- (C) Team captain
- Club field describes current pro club

Roster at the SEA Games 2017.

Thailand National Basketball Team roster
Players
Coaches

Pos.	No.	Name	Age – Date of birth	Height	Club	Ctr.
G	3	Ratdech Kruatiwa	32 – 18 May 1985	1.92 m (6 ft 4 in)	Mono Vampire	(Thailand)
G/F	10	Tyler Lamb	26 – 16 May 1991	1.96 m (6 ft 5 in)	Hong Kong Eastern	(Hong Kong)
G	12	Bandit Lakhan	26 – 21 March 1991	1.88 m (6 ft 2 in)	Hi-Tech Bangkok City	(Thailand)
F/C	15	Sukhdave Ghogar	27 – 1 August 1990	1.96 m (6 ft 5 in)	Hi-Tech Bangkok City	(Thailand)
G	27	Nattakarn Muangboon	26 – 27 March 1991	1.86 m (6 ft 1 in)	Mono Thewphaingarm	(Thailand)
C	31	Chanatip Jakrawan	20 – 10 January 1997	2.03 m (6 ft 8 in)	Hi-Tech Bangkok City	(Thailand)
F/C	36	Patiphan Klahan	24 – 29 June 1993	2.00 m (6 ft 7 in)	Hi-Tech Bangkok City	(Thailand)
F/C	65	Teerawat Chanthachon	22 – 23 April 1995	1.98 m (6 ft 6 in)	Mono Vampire	(Thailand)
G/F	69	Darunpong Apiromvilaichai	32 – 4 March 1985	1.85 m (6 ft 1 in)	Mono Vampire	(Thailand)
F	77	Chitchai Ananti	27 – 26 June 1990	1.90 m (6 ft 3 in)	Mono Vampire	(Thailand)
F	91	Chanachon Klahan (C)	33 – 3 February 1984	1.88 m (6 ft 2 in)	Mono Vampire	(Thailand)
G	45	Kannut Samerjai	28 – 17 October 1988	1.81 m (5 ft 11 in)	Mono Vampire	(Thailand)

Head coach

- (Thailand) Piyapong Piroon

 *   Douglas Marty

Legend

- (C) Team captain
- Club field describes current pro club

Roster at the FIBA Asia Cup 2021 SEABA Pre-Qualifier.

Thailand National Basketball Team roster
Players
Coaches

Pos.	No.	Name	Age – Date of birth	Height	Club	Ctr.
G/F	1	Tyler Lamb	27 – 16 May 1991	1.96 m (6 ft 5 in)	Eastern	(Hong Kong)
G	8	Nakorn Jaisanuk	26 – 18 November 1991	1.91 m (6 ft 3 in)		(Thailand)
G	12	Bandit Lakhan	27 – 21 March 1991	1.91 m (6 ft 3 in)	Hi-Tech Bangkok City	(Thailand)
F	20	Tawatchai Suktub	30 – 5 October 1987	1.97 m (6 ft 6 in)		(Thailand)
G	23	Toby Tai Sathitsumpan	17 – 8 March 2001	1.89 m (6 ft 2 in)		(Thailand)
C	31	Chanatip Jakrawan	21 – 10 January 1997	2.05 m (6 ft 9 in)	Hi-Tech Bangkok City	(Thailand)
F	32	Chatpol Chungyampin	21 – 20 September 1996	1.95 m (6 ft 5 in)		(Thailand)
G	36	Sorot Sunthonsiri	25 – 11 February 1993	1.88 m (6 ft 2 in)		(Thailand)
F/C	39	Patiphan Klahan	25 – 29 June 1993	2.01 m (6 ft 7 in)	Hi-Tech Bangkok City	(Thailand)
G/F	60	Nithipol Sawathavorn	23 – 10 June 1995	1.93 m (6 ft 4 in)		(Thailand)
F/C	65	Teerawat Chanthachon	23 – 23 April 1995	2.02 m (6 ft 8 in)	Mono Vampire	(Thailand)
G/F	69	Darunpong Apiromvilaichai	33 – 4 March 1985	1.95 m (6 ft 5 in)	Mono Vampire	(Thailand)

Head coach

- (United States) Douglas Marty

 *   Chakaphan Pongphantharak
 *   Tongkiat Singhasene

Legend

- (C) Team captain
- Club field describes current pro club

== See also ==
- Thailand women's national basketball team
- Thailand men's national under-18 basketball team
- Thailand men's national under-16 basketball team
