= Malaysia men's national basketball team =

Malaysia
- FIBA ranking: 113 ▲8 (1 September 2026)
- Joined FIBA: 1957
- FIBA zone: FIBA Asia
- National federation: Malaysia Basketball Association (MABA)
- Coach: Yong Kian Ann

Olympic Games
- Appearances: None

FIBA World Cup
- Appearances: 1

FIBA Asia Cup
- Appearances: 24
- Medals: None

SEABA Championship
- Appearances: 12
- Medals: (gold) Gold: (1994, 2005); (silver) Silver: (2003, 2013, 2015); (bronze) Bronze: (1998, 2007, 2009, 2011)
Home	Away

The Malaysia men's national basketball team represents Malaysia at international basketball competitions. It is organized and run by the Malaysia Basketball Association (MABA); (Malay: Persatuan Bola Keranjang Malaysia).

The team had its prime time between 1960 and 1995 when it qualified for the FIBA Asia Championship, Asia's most prestigious basketball tournament, 18 times in a row. In 1986 it qualified for the World Cup, its most noteworthy accomplishment to date.

== Outlook ==
In Malaysia, basketball is predominantly played by people of Chinese background as the game was first introduced in the 20th century in Chinese national schools by teachers from China.

== Performance history ==
=== Summer Olympics ===
Yet to qualify

=== World Championship ===
Year	Position	Tournament	Host
1986	24th	1986 FIBA World Championship	Spain
2023	N/A	2023 FIBA Basketball World Cup	Philippines, Japan and Indonesia

=== FIBA Asia Cup ===
Year	Position	M	W	L
As Malaya
(Philippines) 1960	7th place	6	0	6
(Taiwan) 1963	5th place	11	6	5
As Malaysia
(Malaysia) 1965	6th place	9	2	7
(South Korea) 1967	8th place	9	2	7
(Thailand) 1969	7th place	8	3	5
(Japan) 1971	5th place	8	4	4
(Philippines) 1973	9th place	10	3	7
(Thailand) 1975	8th place	9	5	4
(Malaysia) 1977	4th place	8	4	4
(Japan) 1979	7th place	8	6	2
(India) 1981	6th place	7	2	5
(Hong Kong) 1983	11th place	6	2	4
(Malaysia) 1985	4th place	6	3	3
(Thailand) 1987	7th place	8	4	4
(China) 1989	9th place	6	4	2
(Japan) 1991	17th place	5	1	4
(Indonesia) 1993	14th place	7	2	5
(South Korea) 1995	14th place	8	3	5
(Saudi Arabia) 1997	did not qualify			
(Japan) 1999	15th place	5	0	5
(China) 2001	did not qualify			
(China) 2003	16th place	7	0	7
(Qatar) 2005	16th place	7	0	7
(Japan) 2007	did not qualify			
(China) 2009	did not qualify			
(China) 2011	11th place	8	3	5
(Philippines) 2013	15th place	4	0	4
(China) 2015	16th place	5	0	5
(Lebanon) 2017	did not qualify			
(Indonesia) 2022	did not qualify			
(Saudi Arabia) 2025	did not qualify			
2029	To be determined			
Total	24/31	175	59	116

=== Asian Games ===
- 1951-54: Did not qualify
- 1958: 10th
- 1962: 9th
- 1966: 8th
- 1970: 9th
- 1974: Did not qualify
- 1978: 7th
- 1982: 7th
- 1986: 5th
- 1990-2018: Did not qualify

=== SEABA Championship ===
- 1994: (gold)
- 1996: (bronze) or 4th (result unknown)
- 1998: (bronze)
- 2001: 5th
- 2003: (silver)
- 2005: (gold)
- 2007: (bronze)
- 2009: (bronze)
- 2011: (bronze)
- 2013: (silver)
- 2015: (silver)
- 2017: 4th

=== SEA Games ===
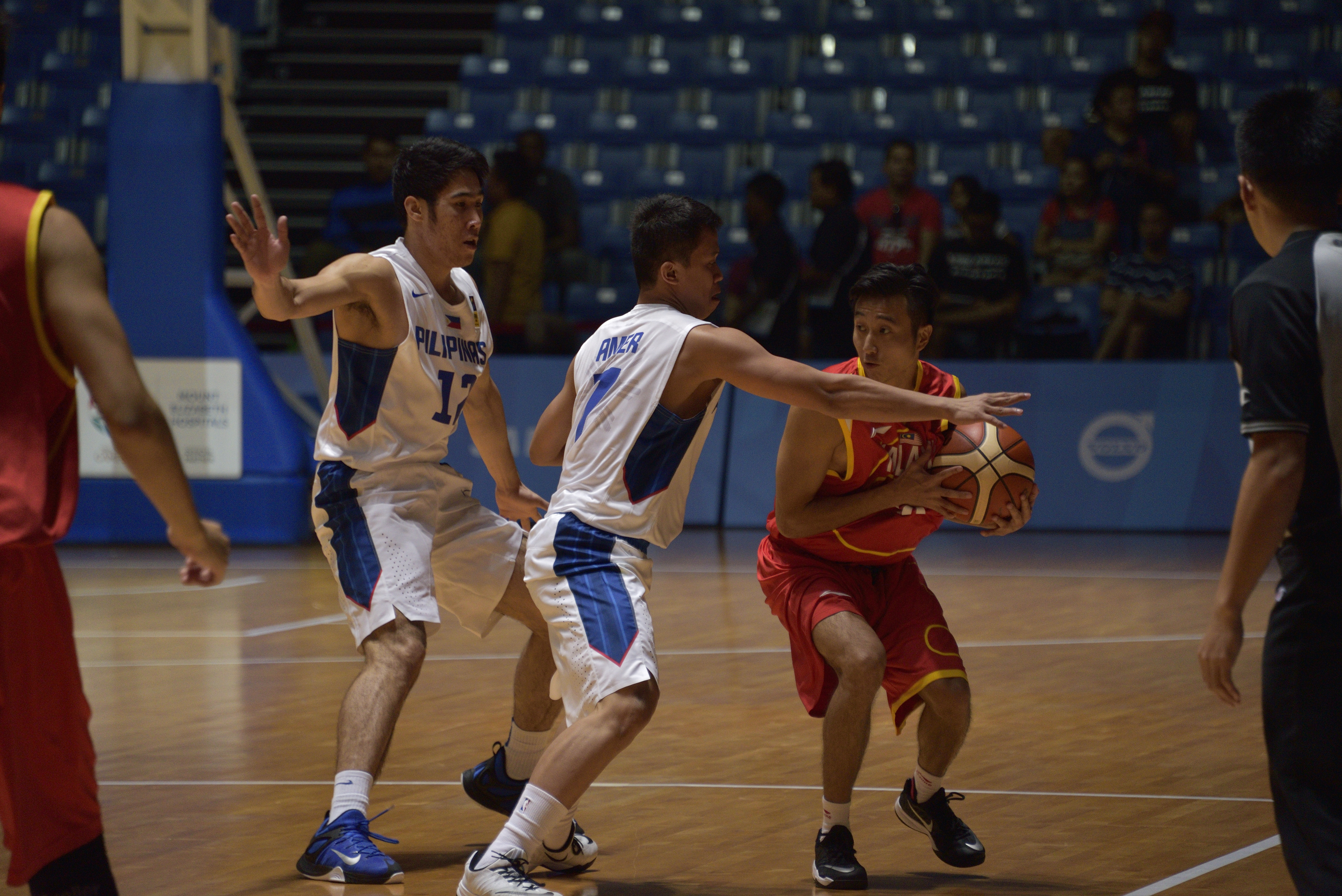
A Malaysian player guarding the ball from two Filipino players.

- 1977: (silver)
- 1979: (gold)
- 1981: (silver)
- 1983: (silver)
- 1985: (silver)
- 1987: (silver)
- 1989: (gold)
- 1991: (bronze)
- 1993: N/A
- 1995: (bronze)
- 1997: (silver)
- 1999: N/A
- 2001: (bronze)
- 2003: (bronze)
- 2007: (bronze)
- 2011: 4th
- 2013: 4th
- 2015: 5th
- 2017: 4th
- 2019: 6th
- 2021: 5th
- 2023: 5th
- 2025: 4th

== Team ==
=== Current roster ===
The following twelve players were named to the roster for the 2025 FIBA Asia Cup Pre-qualifiers.

Malaysia men's national basketball team roster
Players
Coaches

Pos.	No.	Name	Age – Date of birth	Height	Club	Ctr.
SG	7	Zhen Jie Tem	24 – 25 May 1998	1.77 m (5 ft 10 in)	KL Aseel	(Malaysia)
SF	10	Wan Seong Lim	21 – 22 February 2001	1.93 m (6 ft 4 in)	KL Aseel	(Malaysia)
SF	11	Yi Hou Wong	26 – 5 July 1996	1.91 m (6 ft 3 in)	NS Matrix	(Malaysia)
C	15	Wen Qian Anthony	26 – 27 January 1996	1.93 m (6 ft 4 in)	NS Matrix	(Malaysia)
PF	16	Tian Yuan Kuek	31 – 3 August 1991	2.02 m (6 ft 8 in)	NS Matrix	(Malaysia)
PF	23	Wei Young Liew	26 – 10 January 1996	1.89 m (6 ft 2 in)	NS Matrix	(Malaysia)
SG	27	Chun Hong Ting	26 – 8 May 1996	1.91 m (6 ft 3 in)	NS Matrix	(Malaysia)
C	28	Lok Seng Mak	28 – 25 September 1994	1.94 m (6 ft 4 in)	NS Matrix	(Malaysia)
SG	31	Jia Hao Hiew	21 – 17 July 2001	1.73 m (5 ft 8 in)	Selangor XXIII	(Malaysia)
SG	33	Xian Fu Ooi	22 – 1 July 2000	1.87 m (6 ft 2 in)	NS Matrix	(Malaysia)
PG	71	Wei Yong Ong	29 – 12 September 1993	1.77 m (5 ft 10 in)	NS Matrix	(Malaysia)
PG	77	Yee Tong Heng	24 – 24 February 1998	1.78 m (5 ft 10 in)	NS Matrix	(Malaysia)

Head coach

- (Philippines) Jeff Viernes

Assistant coach(es)

- (Malaysia) Lee Kheng Tian

Legend

- (C) Team captain
- (NP) Naturalized player
- Club – describes last
  club before the tournament
- Age – describes age
  on May 5, 2022

== Past rosters ==
Malaysia men's national basketball team – 2015 FIBA Asia Championship roster
Players
Coaches

Pos.	No.	Name	Age – Date of birth	Height	Club	Ctr.
SF	3	Chee Huei Liaw	25 – March 7, 1992	1.87 m (6 ft 2 in)	Westports Malaysia Dragons	(Malaysia)
SG	4	Alvin Ang	23 – July 26, 1993	1.81 m (5 ft 11 in)	Free agent
C	6	Kek Thai Chan	33 – January 27, 1984	1.96 m (6 ft 5 in)	Free agent
PG	7	Kok Hou Teo	22 – October 29, 1994	1.75 m (5 ft 9 in)	Westports Malaysia Dragons	(Malaysia)
PF	8	Wei Hong Choo	24 – June 20, 1992	1.96 m (6 ft 5 in)	Westports Malaysia Dragons	(Malaysia)
PF	13	Zhi Shin Chin	30 – March 16, 1987	1.92 m (6 ft 4 in)	Free agent
SG	17	Vincent Choong	26 – March 10, 1991	1.80 m (5 ft 11 in)	Free agent
C	21	Lok Seng Mak	22 – September 25, 1994	1.94 m (6 ft 4 in)	Negeri Sembilan
PG	24	Yee Tong Heng	19 – February 24, 1998	1.78 m (5 ft 10 in)	Free agent
C	27	Anthony Liew	21 – January 27, 1996	1.94 m (6 ft 4 in)	Free agent
PG	14	Jordan Gan	16 – October 14, 2000	1.77 m (5 ft 10 in)	Free agent
SF	89	Chun Hong Ting	21 – May 8, 1996	1.85 m (6 ft 1 in)	Negeri Sembilan

Head coach

- (Malaysia) Goh Cheng Huat

Assistant coach(es)

- (Malaysia) Lee Kheng Tian

Legend

- Club – describes last
  club before the tournament
- Age – describes age
  on 12 May 2017

2017 Southeast Asian Games

Malaysia National Basketball Team roster
Players
Coaches

Pos.	No.	Name	Age – Date of birth	Height	Club
C	34	Chee, Li Wei	–	1.97 m (6 ft 6 in)		(Malaysia)
C	6	Chan, Kek Thai	–	1.96 m (6 ft 5 in)		(Malaysia)
F	2	Wong, Chin Yong	–	1.96 m (6 ft 5 in)		(Malaysia)
F	35	Lim, Perry	–	1.95 m (6 ft 5 in)	Negeri Sembilan	(Malaysia)
F	0	Kuek, Tian Yuan	–	2.00 m (6 ft 7 in)	Westports Malaysia Dragons	(Malaysia)
F	41	Yeo, Ivan	–	1.95 m (6 ft 5 in)	Westports Malaysia Dragons	(Malaysia)
F	11	Wong, Yi Hou	–	1.91 m (6 ft 3 in)	Negeri Sembilan	(Malaysia)
G/F	27	Ting, Chun Hong	–	1.85 m (6 ft 1 in)	Negeri Sembilan	(Malaysia)
G/F	20	Loh, Shee Fai	–	1.92 m (6 ft 4 in)	Miri Firehouse	(Malaysia)
G	7	Teo, Kok Hou	22 – 29 October 1994	1.75 m (5 ft 9 in)	Westports Malaysia Dragons	(Malaysia)
G	1	Ma, Chee Khuen	–	1.79 m (5 ft 10 in)	Westports Malaysia Dragons	(Malaysia)
G	4	Soo, Eng Heng	–	1.83 m (6 ft 0 in)		(Malaysia)

Head coach

- (Malaysia) Goh Cheng Huat

Assistant coach(es)

- (Malaysia) Lee Kheng Tian

Legend

- (C) Team captain
- Club – describes last
  club before the tournament
- Age – describes age
  on 26 August 2017

=== 2019 Southeast Asian Games ===
2019 Southeast Asian Games

Malaysia National Basketball Team roster
Players
Coaches

Pos.	No.	Name	Age – Date of birth	Height	Club
F	0	Kuek, Tian Yuan	28 – 3 August 1991	2.00 m (6 ft 7 in)	Kuala Lumpur Dragons	(Malaysia)
G	2	Teoh, Yi Kang	18 – 16 November 2001	1.72 m (5 ft 8 in)	Farmco TouchUp	(Malaysia)
G	4	Foo, Ting Jun	22 – 3 January 1997	1.70 m (5 ft 7 in)	NS Matrix	(Malaysia)
G	8	De, Wee Yiang	20 – 13 April 1999	1.82 m (6 ft 0 in)	NS Matrix	(Malaysia)
F	10	Yek, Liang Chuan	22 – 24 February 1997	1.90 m (6 ft 3 in)	NS Matrix	(Malaysia)
G	11	Wong, Yi Hou	23 – 5 July 1996	1.91 m (6 ft 3 in)	NS Matrix	(Malaysia)
F	23	Liew, Wei Yuong	23 – 10 January 1996	1.88 m (6 ft 2 in)	NS Matrix	(Malaysia)
G/F	27	Ting, Chun Hong	23 – 8 May 1996	1.91 m (6 ft 3 in)	Kuala Lumpur Dragons	(Malaysia)
F	33	Ooi, Xian Fu	19 – 1 July 2000	1.91 m (6 ft 3 in)	NS Matrix	(Malaysia)
F	35	Lim, Perry Lee	21 – 27 May 1998	1.95 m (6 ft 5 in)	Negri Sembilan	(Malaysia)
G	44	Chin, Chieng Wah	25 – 21 October 1994	1.83 m (6 ft 0 in)	Kuala Lumpur Dragons	(Malaysia)
G	71	Ong, Wei Yong Ong	26 – 12 September 1993	1.77 m (5 ft 10 in)	NS Matrix	(Malaysia)

Head coach

- (Australia) Brian Joseph Lester

Assistant coach(es)

- (Malaysia) Lee Kheng Tian

Legend

- (C) Team captain
- Club – describes last
  club before the tournament
- Age – describes age
  on 10 December 2019

== Head coaches ==
- (United States) Thomas Wisman (1985–1986)
- (Australia) Brian Lester (1995–1996)
- (United States) Thomas Wisman (1996-2003)
- (Australia) Brian Lester (2003–2006)
- (Malaysia) Sim Sin Heng (2007–2008)
- (Malaysia) Goh Cheng Huat (2009–2011)
- (Malaysia) Teh Choon Yean (2013–2014)
- (Philippines) Paul Advincula (2013–2016)
- (Malaysia) Goh Cheng Huat (2016–2017)
- (Australia) Brian Lester (2018–2019)
- (Malaysia) Teng Chong Siew (2020–2022)
- (Philippines) Jeff Viernes (2022–2023)
- (Malaysia) Yong Kian Ann (2023–2023）
- (United States) Felton Sealy (2025）
- (Japan) Yasuhito Matsui (2026）
- (Malaysia) Kuek Tian Yuan (interim) (2026）

== See also ==
- Malaysia national under-19 basketball team
- Malaysia national under-17 basketball team
- Malaysia women's national basketball team
- Malaysia Pro League
