= Bhutan men's national basketball team =

Bhutan
- FIBA ranking: NR (1 September 2026)
- Joined FIBA: 1983
- FIBA zone: FIBA Asia
- National federation: Bhutan Basketball Federation

FIBA Asia Cup
- Appearances: None

SABA Championship
- Appearances: 2
- Medals: None
Home	Away

The Bhutan national basketball team represents Bhutan in international men's basketball and is controlled by the Bhutan Basketball Federation.

In 2011, Bhutan's national basketball team played its first international match in the 26th FIBA Asia zone qualifying tournament in New Delhi. On the same year, it also joined the Sheik Kamal International basketball tournament, which was held in Bangladesh. The team was also named as the most disciplined team at the 2015 South Asian Basketball Association championship.

== Coaches ==
- (South Korea) Kim Kiyong (2013-2015)
- (Bhutan) Tenzin Jamtsho (2015)

== Competitions ==
=== FIBA Asia Cup ===
Year	Position	Pld	W	L
(Philippines) 1960	Not a FIBA member			
(Taiwan) 1963	Not a FIBA member			
(Malaysia) 1965	Not a FIBA member			
(South Korea) 1967	Not a FIBA member			
(Thailand) 1969	Not a FIBA member			
(Japan) 1971	Not a FIBA member			
(Philippines) 1973	Not a FIBA member			
(Thailand) 1975	Not a FIBA member			
(Malaysia) 1977	Not a FIBA member			
(Japan) 1979	Not a FIBA member			
(India) 1981	Not a FIBA member			
(Hong Kong) 1983	Not a FIBA member			
(Malaysia) 1985	Did not enter			
(Thailand) 1987	Did not enter			
(China) 1989	Did not enter			
(Japan) 1991	Did not enter			
(Indonesia) 1993	Did not enter			
(South Korea) 1995	Did not enter			
(Saudi Arabia) 1997	Did not enter			
(Japan) 1999	Did not enter			
(China) 2001	Did not enter			
(China) 2003	Did not enter			
(Qatar) 2005	Did not enter			
(Japan) 2007	Did not enter			
(China) 2009	Did not enter			
(China) 2011	Did not qualify			
(Philippines) 2013	Did not enter			
(China) 2015	Did not qualify			
(Lebanon) 2017	Did not enter			
(Indonesia) 2022	Did not qualify			
(Saudi Arabia) 2025	Did not enter			
2029	Did not enter			
Total	0/31	0	0	0

=== SABA Championship ===
- 2015 : 6th
- 2018 : 4th

=== South Asian Games ===
- 1995-2010 : Did Not Participate
- 2016 : 6th
