= Yemen men's national basketball team =

Yemen
- FIBA ranking: NR (1 September 2026)
- Joined FIBA: 1971
- FIBA zone: FIBA Asia
- National federation: Yemen Basketball Association

Olympic Games
- Appearances: None

FIBA World Cup
- Appearances: None

FIBA Asia Cup
- Appearances: None
Home	Away

The Yemen national basketball team represents Yemen in international basketball competitions. It is managed by the Yemen Basketball Association (YBA). (Arabic: الجمعية اليمنية لكرة السلة) Its best result was 4th place at the 2005 West Asian Basketball Championship.

== Competitive record ==
=== Summer Olympics ===
Yet to qualify

=== World championships ===
Yet to qualify

=== FIBA Asia Cup ===
Year	Position	Pld	W	L
(Philippines) 1960	Not a FIBA member			
(Taiwan) 1963	Not a FIBA member			
(Malaysia) 1965	Not a FIBA member			
(South Korea) 1967	Not a FIBA member			
(Thailand) 1969	Not a FIBA member			
(Japan) 1971	Not a FIBA member			
(Philippines) 1973	Did not enter			
(Thailand) 1975	Did not enter			
(Malaysia) 1977	Did not enter			
(Japan) 1979	Did not enter			
(India) 1981	Did not enter			
(Hong Kong) 1983	Did not enter			
(Malaysia) 1985	Did not enter			
(Thailand) 1987	Did not enter			
(China) 1989	Did not enter			
(Japan) 1991	Did not enter			
(Indonesia) 1993	Did not enter			
(South Korea) 1995	Did not enter			
(Saudi Arabia) 1997	Did not enter			
(Japan) 1999	Did not enter			
(China) 2001	Did not enter			
(China) 2003	Did not enter			
(Qatar) 2005	Did not qualify			
(Japan) 2007	Did not enter			
(China) 2009	Did not enter			
(China) 2011	Did not enter			
(Philippines) 2013	Did not enter			
(China) 2015	Did not enter			
(Lebanon) 2017	Did not enter			
(Indonesia) 2022	Did not enter			
(Saudi Arabia) 2025	Did not enter			
2029	Did not enter			
Total	0/32	0	0	0

=== Asian Games ===
- 1951–1978 : Did not qualify
- 1982 : 12th
- 1986–2022 : Did not qualify
- 2026 : To be determined

=== Islamic Solidarity Games ===
- 2005 : 13th
- 2013–2017 : Did not participate

=== West Asian Basketball Championship ===
- 2005 : 4th
- 2012 : 6th
- 2014 : 6th

== Current roster ==
At the 2014 WABA Championship Games:

Yemen men's national basketball team roster
Players
Coaches

Pos.	No.	Name	Age – Date of birth	Height	Club	Ctr.
F	4	Aiman Sadakah	–	1.86 m (6 ft 1 in)
PG	5	Mohammed Yaeesh	–	1.82 m (6 ft 0 in)	Al Tilal	(Yemen)
F	6	Mamady Macalou	–	1.94 m (6 ft 4 in)	Al Tilal	(Yemen)
F	7	Sultan Shaker	–	1.93 m (6 ft 4 in)	Al Tilal	(Yemen)
G/F	8	Samer Al-Asbahi	–	1.83 m (6 ft 0 in)	Al Tilal	(Yemen)
G	9	Salah Al-Hanbasi	–	1.84 m (6 ft 0 in)	Al Tilal	(Yemen)
C	10	Ahmed Abdulghafor	–	2.00 m (6 ft 7 in)	Al Tilal	(Yemen)
SG	11	Sabri Sadaqah	–	1.88 m (6 ft 2 in)	Al Tilal	(Yemen)
PG	12	Mohamad Nasrallah	–	1.77 m (5 ft 10 in)
C	13	Hakim Adamien	–	2.05 m (6 ft 9 in)
C	14	Radhi BaYashot	–	2.00 m (6 ft 7 in)
F	15	Abdulaziz Moqbel	–	1.92 m (6 ft 4 in)	Al-Ahli Club Sana'a	(Yemen)

Head coach

- (France) Guy Arnaud

Assistant coaches

- (Yemen) Mohammad Yehia
- (Yemen) Majed Sadaqah

Legend

- Club – describes last
  club before the tournament
- Age – describes age
  on 26 May 2014

== Head coach position ==
- (United States) (Dominican Republic) Ozell Wells – 2009
- (France) Guy Arnaud – 2012
