= 2012 FIBA Asia Under-18 Championship qualification =

The 2012 FIBA Asia Under-18 Championship qualification was held in late 2011 and early 2012 with the Gulf region, West Asia, Southeast Asia, East Asia, Central Asia and South Asia each conducting tournaments.

== Qualification format ==
The following are eligible to participate:

- The organizing country.
- The champion team from the previous FIBA Asia Under-18 Championship.
- The four best-placed teams from the previous FIBA Asia Under-18 Championship will qualify the same number of teams from their respective sub-zones.
- The two best teams from the sub-zones.

== 2010 FIBA Asia Under-18 Championship ==
| Rank | Team | Note |
|---|---|---|
| 1st place, gold medalist(s) | China | Direct Qualifier |
| 2nd place, silver medalist(s) | South Korea | East Asia (+1) |
| 3rd place, bronze medalist(s) | Chinese Taipei | East Asia (+2) |
| 4 | Iran | West Asia (+1) |
| 5 | Philippines | Southeast Asia (+1) |
| 6 | Yemen | |
| 7 | Lebanon | |
| 8 | Japan | |
| 9 | Syria | |
| 10 | Iraq | |
| 11 | Kazakhstan | |
| 12 | Malaysia | |
| 13 | India | |
| 14 | Sri Lanka | |
| 15 | Saudi Arabia | |
| 16 | Qatar | |

== Qualified teams ==
| Central Asia (1) | East Asia (2+2+2) | Gulf (2) | South Asia (1) | Southeast Asia (2+1) | West Asia (2+1) |
|---|---|---|---|---|---|
| Kazakhstan | Mongolia | Bahrain | India | Philippines | Iran |
| | China | Saudi Arabia | | Indonesia | Lebanon |
| | Chinese Taipei | | | Singapore | Syria |
| | Hong Kong | | | | |
| | Japan | | | | |
| | South Korea | | | | |

== Central Asia ==
The 2012 CABA Under-18 Championship is the qualifying tournament for the 2012 FIBA Asia Under-18 Championship; it also serves as a regional championship involving Central Asia basketball teams. It was held on June 20 to June 23, 2012 at Tashkent, Uzbekistan. The winner qualifies to the 2012 FIBA Asia Under-18 Championship.

| Team | Pld | W | L | PF | PA | PD | Pts |
|---|---|---|---|---|---|---|---|
| Kazakhstan | 3 | 3 | 0 | 217 | 192 | +25 | 6 |
| Uzbekistan | 3 | 2 | 1 | 191 | 163 | +28 | 5 |
| Turkmenistan | 3 | 1 | 2 | 171 | 198 | -27 | 4 |
| Kyrgyzstan | 3 | 0 | 3 | 179 | 205 | -26 | 3 |

July 21
18:00

| Uzbekistan | 58–41 | Turkmenistan |

Hall Of The Central House, Tashkent

July 22
15:00

| Turkmenistan | 62–56 | Kyrgyzstan |

Hall Of The Central House, Tashkent

July 22
18:00

| Kazakhstan | 63–60 | Uzbekistan |

Hall Of The Central House, Tashkent

July 23
12:00

| Uzbekistan | 73–59 | Kyrgyzstan |

Hall Of The Central House, Tashkent

July 23
15:00

| Kazakhstan | 70–64 | Kyrgyzstan |

Hall Of The Central House, Tashkent

July 23
18:00

| Kazakhstan | 84–68 | Turkmenistan |

Hall Of The Central House, Tashkent

== East Asia ==
All the others withdrew, so Chinese Taipei,Hong Kong,Japan,South Korea qualified automatically.

== South Asia ==
The 2012 SABA Under-18 Championship was held from February 24 to 26, 2012 in New Delhi, India. The winner teams qualifies for 2010 FIBA Asia Under-18 Championship.<

| Team | Pld | W | L | PF | PA | PD | Pts |
|---|---|---|---|---|---|---|---|
| India | 3 | 3 | 0 | 276 | 117 | +159 | 6 |
| Bangladesh | 3 | 2 | 1 | 184 | 173 | +11 | 5 |
| Sri Lanka | 3 | 1 | 2 | 165 | 215 | -50 | 4 |
| Nepal | 3 | 0 | 3 | 142 | 262 | -120 | 3 |

February 24
9:30

| Bangladesh | 75–56 | Sri Lanka |

Thyagaraj Stadium, New Delhi

February 24
11:30

| India | 120–41 | Nepal |

Thyagaraj Stadium, New Delhi

February 25
9:00

| Bangladesh | 78–54 | Nepal |

Thyagaraj Stadium, New Delhi

February 25
12:00

| India | 93–45 | Sri Lanka |

Thyagaraj Stadium, New Delhi

February 26
3:30

| Sri Lanka | 64–47 | Nepal |

Thyagaraj Stadium, New Delhi

February 26
5:30

| India | 63–31 | Bangladesh |

Thyagaraj Stadium, New Delhi

== Southeast Asia ==
The 8th SEABA Under-18 Championship was held at Singapore from 26 to 30 June 2012.

| Rank | Team |
|---|---|
| Gold medal | Philippines |
| Silver medal | Indonesia |
| Bronze medal | Singapore |
| 4 | Malaysia |
| 5 | Laos |
