= 2011 FIBA Asia Championship qualification =

The 2011 FIBA Asia Championship qualification was held in late 2010 and early 2011 with the Gulf region, West Asia, Southeast Asia, East Asia and Middle Asia (Central Asia and South Asia) each conducting tournaments.

== Qualification format ==
The following are eligible to participate:

- The organizing country.
- The champion team from the previous FIBA Asia Stanković Cup.
- The four best-placed teams from the previous FIBA Asia Stanković Cup will qualify the same number of teams from their respective sub-zones.
- The two best teams from the sub-zones.

== FIBA Asia Stanković Cup ==
Rank	Team	Note
1st place, gold medalist(s)	Lebanon	Direct Qualifier
2nd place, silver medalist(s)	Japan	East Asia (+1)
3rd place, bronze medalist(s)	Qatar	Gulf (+1)
4	Philippines	Southeast Asia (+1)
5	Jordan	West Asia (+1)
6	Iran	
7	Chinese Taipei	
8	Kazakhstan	
9	Iraq	
10	Syria	

== Qualified teams ==
East Asia (1+2+1)	Gulf (2+1)	Middle Asia (2)	Southeast Asia (2+1)	West Asia (1+2+1)
China	Qatar	India	Philippines	Lebanon
South Korea	United Arab Emirates	Uzbekistan	Indonesia	Iran
Japan	Bahrain		Malaysia	Jordan
Chinese Taipei				Syria

== East Asia ==
The 2011 East Asia Basketball Championship is the qualifying tournament for the 2011 FIBA Asia Championship. It also serves as a regional championship involving East Asian basketball teams. the three best teams excluding China qualifies for 2011 FIBA Asia Championship. The tournament was held from June 10 to 15, 2011 in Nanjing, China.

=== Preliminary round ===
==== Group A ====
Team	Pld	W	L	PF	PA	PD	Pts
China	2	2	0	165	97	+68	4
South Korea	2	1	1	188	108	+80	3
Hong Kong	2	0	2	90	238	−148	2

June 10
14:00

South Korea	134–47	Hong Kong
Scoring by quarter: 28–5, 42–12, 31–11, 33–19

Olympic Sports Center Gymnasium, Nanjing

June 11
16:00

Hong Kong	43–104	China
Scoring by quarter: 5–28, 11–21, 12–35, 15–20

Olympic Sports Center Gymnasium, Nanjing

June 12
16:00

China	61–54	South Korea
Scoring by quarter: 15–10, 13–16, 19–12, 14–16

Olympic Sports Center Gymnasium, Nanjing

==== Group B ====
Team	Pld	W	L	PF	PA	PD	Pts
Chinese Taipei	2	2	0	160	145	+15	4
Japan	2	1	1	168	148	+20	3
Mongolia	2	0	2	144	179	−35	2

June 10
16:00

Japan	74–75	Chinese Taipei
Scoring by quarter: 14–13, 18–14, 17–25, 25–23

Olympic Sports Center Gymnasium, Nanjing

June 11
14:00

Chinese Taipei	85–71	Mongolia
Scoring by quarter: 25–30, 18–16, 18–11, 24–14

Olympic Sports Center Gymnasium, Nanjing

June 12
14:00

Mongolia	73–94	Japan
Scoring by quarter: 17–28, 16–19, 18–22, 22–25

Olympic Sports Center Gymnasium, Nanjing

=== Classification 5th–6th ===
June 14
14:00

Mongolia	83–87	Hong Kong
Scoring by quarter: 15–10, 23–26, 18–30, 27–21

Olympic Sports Center Gymnasium, Nanjing

=== Final round ===
Semifinals
June 14
Chinese Taipei	61
South Korea	69
June 14
China	62
Japan	72

Final
June 15
South Korea	89
Japan	73
3rd place
June 15
Chinese Taipei	53
China	87

==== Semifinals ====
June 14
16:00

Chinese Taipei	61–69	South Korea
Scoring by quarter: 11–19, 17–16, 18–15, 15–19

Olympic Sports Center Gymnasium, Nanjing

June 14
19:30

China	62–72	Japan
Scoring by quarter: 15–12, 23–12, 10–26, 14–22

Olympic Sports Center Gymnasium, Nanjing

==== 3rd place ====
June 15
16:00

Chinese Taipei	53–87	China
Scoring by quarter: 15–23, 11–11, 11–30, 16–23

Olympic Sports Center Gymnasium, Nanjing

==== Final ====
June 15
19:30

South Korea	89–73	Japan
Scoring by quarter: 25–13, 15–24, 23–17, 26–19

Olympic Sports Center Gymnasium, Nanjing

=== Final standing ===
Rank	Team
1st place, gold medalist(s)	South Korea
2nd place, silver medalist(s)	Japan
3rd place, bronze medalist(s)	China
4	Chinese Taipei
5	Hong Kong
6	Mongolia

== Gulf ==
The 12th Gulf Basketball Championship is the qualifying tournament for the FIBA Asia Championship 2011. it also serves as a regional championship. the three best teams qualifies for FIBA Asia Championship 2011.

=== Preliminary round ===
Team	Pld	W	L	PF	PA	PD	Pts
Qatar	3	3	0	247	220	+27	6
Bahrain	3	2	1	211	205	+6	5
United Arab Emirates	3	1	2	209	214	−5	4
Saudi Arabia	3	0	3	198	226	−28	3

September 27
17:00

Qatar	80–72	Saudi Arabia
Scoring by quarter: 27–12, 11–21, 18–18, 24–21

Al-Shabab Club Court, Dubai

September 27
20:00

United Arab Emirates	61–65	Bahrain
Scoring by quarter: 15–18, 16–16, 12–13, 18–18

Al-Shabab Club Court, Dubai

September 28
17:00

Saudi Arabia	66–79	United Arab Emirates
Scoring by quarter: 17–19, 15–21, 11–13, 23–26

Al-Shabab Club Court, Dubai

September 28
19:00

Bahrain	79–84	Qatar
Scoring by quarter: 26–16, 20–25, 18–24, 15–19

Al-Shabab Club Court, Dubai

September 30
17:00

Saudi Arabia	60–67	Bahrain
Scoring by quarter: 18–8, 24–25, 8–17, 10–17

Al-Shabab Club Court, Dubai

September 30
19:00

United Arab Emirates	69–83	Qatar
Scoring by quarter: 13–20, 13–19, 15–17, 18–17

Al-Shabab Club Court, Dubai

=== Final round ===
Semifinals
October 1
Qatar	89
Saudi Arabia	64
October 1
Bahrain	59
United Arab Emirates	69

Final
October 3
Qatar	81
United Arab Emirates	74
3rd place
October 3
Saudi Arabia	55
Bahrain	67

==== Semifinals ====
October 1
17:00

Bahrain	59–69	United Arab Emirates
Scoring by quarter: 17–16, 16–22, 13–18, 13–13

Al-Shabab Club Court, Dubai

October 1
19:00

Qatar	89–64	Saudi Arabia
Scoring by quarter: 20–16, 18–15, 21–15, 30–18

Al-Shabab Club Court, Dubai

==== 3rd place ====
October 3
17:00

Saudi Arabia	55–67	Bahrain
Scoring by quarter: 15–15, 15–18, 15–21, 10–13

Al-Shabab Club Court, Dubai

==== Final ====
October 3
19:00

Qatar	81–74	United Arab Emirates
Scoring by quarter: 28–18, 13–14, 16–15, 24–27

Al-Shabab Club Court, Dubai

=== Final standing ===
Rank	Team
1st place, gold medalist(s)	Qatar
2nd place, silver medalist(s)	United Arab Emirates
3rd place, bronze medalist(s)	Bahrain
4	Saudi Arabia

== Middle Asia – SAARC ==
The 2011 Middle Asia qualifying tournament for SAARC teams was held from July 13 to 15, 2011 in New Delhi, India. The best team qualifies for 2011 FIBA Asia Championship.

=== Preliminary round ===
==== Group A ====
Team	Pld	W	L	PF	PA	PD	Pts
India	1	1	0	99	42	+57	2
Sri Lanka	1	0	1	42	99	−57	1

July 13
17:00

India	99–42	Sri Lanka
Scoring by quarter: 32–5, 28–15, 26–14, 13–8

Thyagaraj Stadium, New Delhi

==== Group B ====
Team	Pld	W	L	PF	PA	PD	Pts
Nepal	2	2	0	143	114	+29	4
Bangladesh	2	1	1	153	123	+30	3
Bhutan	2	0	2	112	171	−59	2

July 13
9:00

Nepal	79–53	Bhutan
Scoring by quarter: 24–13, 20–13, 16–13, 19–14

Thyagaraj Stadium, New Delhi

July 13
19:00

Bhutan	59–92	Bangladesh
Scoring by quarter: 11–15, 24–23, 13–31, 11–23

Thyagaraj Stadium, New Delhi

July 14
9:00

Bangladesh	61–64	Nepal
Scoring by quarter: 16–15, 13–14, 19–23, 13–12

Thyagaraj Stadium, New Delhi

=== Final round ===
Semifinals
July 14
India	120
Bangladesh	26
July 14
Nepal	44
Sri Lanka	65

Final
July 15
India	89
Sri Lanka	35
3rd place
July 15
Bangladesh	62
Nepal	73

==== Semifinals ====
July 14
17:00

India	120–26	Bangladesh
Scoring by quarter: 27–8, 36–9, 23–8, 34–1

Thyagaraj Stadium, New Delhi

July 14
19:00

Nepal	44–65	Sri Lanka
Scoring by quarter: 15–10, 16–19, 6–18, 7–18

Thyagaraj Stadium, New Delhi

==== 3rd place ====
July 15
15:00

Bangladesh	62–73	Nepal
Scoring by quarter: 19–23, 14–19, 9–15, 20–16

Thyagaraj Stadium, New Delhi

==== Final ====
July 15
17:00

India	89–35	Sri Lanka
Scoring by quarter: 25–2, 26–9, 22–10, 16–14

Thyagaraj Stadium, New Delhi

=== Final standing ===
Rank	Team
1st place, gold medalist(s)	India
2nd place, silver medalist(s)	Sri Lanka
3rd place, bronze medalist(s)	Nepal
4	Bangladesh
5	Bhutan

== Middle Asia – Stans ==
The 2011 Middle Asia qualifying tournament for ‘Stans’ section of the Middle Asia was held on July 31, 2011 in Navoiy, Uzbekistan. The best team qualifies for 2011 FIBA Asia Championship. Afghanistan was supposed to play in this tournament but Uzbekistan's foreign ministry did not authorize the visas to travel to the tournament.

Team	Pld	W	L	PF	PA	PD	Pts
Uzbekistan	1	1	0	82	59	+23	2
Turkmenistan	1	0	1	59	82	−23	1

July 31

Uzbekistan	82–59	Turkmenistan
Scoring by quarter: 22–13, 22–18, 15–11, 23–17

Palais des Sports FSK, Navoiy

== Southeast Asia ==
The 2011 Southeast Asia Basketball Association Championship is the qualifying tournament for the 2011 FIBA Asia Championship; it also serves as a regional championship involving Southeast Asian basketball teams. It was held on June 23 to June 26, 2011 at Jakarta, Indonesia. The top three finishers qualifies to the 2011 FIBA Asia Championship.

=== Preliminary round ===
Team	Pld	W	L	PF	PA	PD	Pts
Philippines	3	3	0	297	176	+121	6
Indonesia	3	2	1	202	201	+1	5
Malaysia	3	1	2	190	238	−48	4
Singapore	3	0	3	175	249	−74	3

June 23
16:00

Malaysia	71–97	Philippines
Scoring by quarter: 20–20, 21–16, 16–27, 14–34

The BritAma Arena, Jakarta

June 23
19:00

Indonesia	71–60	Singapore
Scoring by quarter: 16–14, 15–20, 17–20, 23–6

The BritAma Arena, Jakarta

June 24
16:00

Singapore	64–72	Malaysia
Scoring by quarter: 17–21, 13–23, 7–16, 27–12

The BritAma Arena, Jakarta

June 24
18:00

Philippines	94–54	Indonesia
Scoring by quarter: 20–9, 29–13, 22–16, 23–16

The BritAma Arena, Jakarta

June 25
16:00

Singapore	51–106	Philippines
Scoring by quarter: 9–30, 14–30, 20–17, 8–29

The BritAma Arena, Jakarta

June 25
18:00

Indonesia	77–47	Malaysia
Scoring by quarter: 10–4, 23–23, 20–16, 24–4

The BritAma Arena, Jakarta

=== Final ===
June 26
18:00

Philippines	89–50	Indonesia
Scoring by quarter: 31–10, 15–17, 21–8, 22–15

The BritAma Arena, Jakarta

=== Final standing ===
Rank	Team
1st place, gold medalist(s)	Philippines
2nd place, silver medalist(s)	Indonesia
3rd place, bronze medalist(s)	Malaysia
4	Singapore

== West Asia ==
The 2011 WABA Championship is the qualifying tournament for the 2011 FIBA Asia Championship. It also serves as a regional championship involving West Asian basketball teams. the three best teams qualifies for 2011 FIBA Asia Championship. The tournament was held from June 23 to 25, 2011 in Duhok, Iraq.

Team	Pld	W	L	PF	PA	PD	Pts
Iran	3	3	0	248	184	+64	6
Jordan	3	2	1	241	224	+17	5
Syria	3	1	2	229	260	−31	4
Iraq	3	0	3	214	264	−50	3

June 23
17:00

Iran	72–70	Jordan
Scoring by quarter: 21–11, 15–25, 11–14, 25–20

Education College Sports, Duhok

June 23
19:00

Iraq	85–92	Syria
Scoring by quarter: 26–21, 16–27, 27–29, 16–15

Education College Sports, Duhok

June 24
17:00

Syria	62–83	Iran
Scoring by quarter: 16–13, 11–23, 18–19, 17–28

Education College Sports, Duhok

June 24
19:00

Jordan	79–77	Iraq
Scoring by quarter: 13–21, 14–21, 22–16, 30–19

Education College Sports, Duhok

June 25
17:00

Jordan	92–75	Syria
Scoring by quarter: 22–19, 28–13, 21–25, 21–18

Education College Sports, Duhok

June 25
19:00

Iraq	52–93	Iran
Scoring by quarter: 12–29, 19–23, 8–25, 13–16

Education College Sports, Duhok
