= Bangladesh men's national basketball team =

National basketball team of Bangladesh

Bangladesh
- FIBA ranking: 137 ▲3 (13 July 2026)
- Joined FIBA: 1978
- FIBA zone: FIBA Asia
- National federation: Bangladesh Basketball Federation (BBF)

FIBA World Cup
- Appearances: 0

FIBA Asia Cup
- Appearances: 4
- Medals: None

South Asian Games
- Appearances: 1
- Medals: Bronze: 2010

SABA Championship
- Appearances: 8
- Medals: Gold: 2013 Silver: 2002, 2014, 2017, 2018 Bronze: 2021
Home	Away

First international
- Bangladesh 73–114 Hong Kong (Nagoya, Japan; 30 November 1979)

Biggest win
- Bangladesh 90–80 Sri Lanka (Malé, Maldives; 20 May 2017)

Biggest defeat
- Bangladesh 71–171 Malaysia (Nagoya, Japan; 5 December 1979)
Medal record
SABA Championship
Gold medal – first place	2013 Bangladesh
Silver medal – second place	2002 India
Silver medal – second place	2014 Nepal
Silver medal – second place	2017 Maldives
Silver medal – second place	2018 Bangladesh
Bronze medal – third place	2021 Bangladesh
South Asian Games
Bronze medal – third place	2010 Bangladesh

The Bangladesh national basketball team is the national basketball team representing Bangladesh. It is administered by the Bangladesh Basketball Federation. The team's top achievement to date was the bronze medal at the 2010 South Asian Games.

== Olympic Games and World Championship record ==
Bangladesh has never qualified for Basketball at the Summer Olympics or the FIBA World Championship.

== Asian Championship record ==
Bangladesh won their 1st international Championship in 2013, winning the FIBA Asia SABA Championship.

Bangladesh has yet to prove it can compete against Asia's basketball elite. The team still waits for its first victory at the FIBA Asia Championship. Its best finish was 13th in 1979.

== Past rosters ==
Bangladesh men's national basketball team – 2021 FIBA Asia Cup Pre-Qualifiers roster
Players
Coaches

Pos.	No.	Name	Age – Date of birth	Height	Club	Ctr.
PF	12	Mithun Kumar Biswas	31 – October 1, 1989	1.92 m (6 ft 4 in)
F	7	Md Shamsuzzaman Khan	26 – July 25, 1994	1.83 m (6 ft 0 in)
SF		Mithun Sarkar	36 – January 1, 1985	1.93 m (6 ft 4 in)
SF	6	Md Shahanur Rahman	22 – September 28, 1998	1.96 m (6 ft 5 in)
PG	10	Md Naimur Rahman	27 – February 14, 1994	1.74 m (5 ft 9 in)
SG	8	Md Tareq Aziz	28 – January 6, 1993	1.88 m (6 ft 2 in)
F	23	Saiful Islam	24 – December 8, 1996	1.88 m (6 ft 2 in)
SG	11	Md Masud Rana	23 – October 10, 1997	1.96 m (6 ft 5 in)
F	13	Md Abdul Alim	30 – February 24, 1991	1.86 m (6 ft 1 in)
C	24	Md Mamunur Rahman	24 – August 3, 1996	1.93 m (6 ft 4 in)
F	14	Md Rofikuzzaman	22 – January 1, 1999	1.73 m (5 ft 8 in)
PG	9	Mohammad Raniur Rahman	26 – December 28, 1994	1.80 m (5 ft 11 in)

Head coach

- (Bangladesh) Wasif Ali

Assistant coach(es)

- (Bangladesh) Ranjit Chandra Das

Legend

- Club – describes last
  club before the tournament
- Age – describes age
  on 12 May 2021

== Results and fixtures ==
Win Loss

=== 2021 ===
15 November 2021 2021 SABA Championship	Bangladesh	56–67	Sri Lanka	Shaheed Suhrawardy Indoor Stadium, Dhaka
10:00 BST (UTC+6)	Scoring by quarter: 15–14, 15–16, 15–11, 11–26
		[Boxscore]

17 November 2021 2021 SABA Championship	Bangladesh	86–65	Maldives	Shaheed Suhrawardy Indoor Stadium, Dhaka
11:00 BST (UTC+6)	Scoring by quarter: 25–10, 19–15, 16–21, 26–19
		[Boxscore]

19 November 2021 2021 SABA Championship	India	106–41	Bangladesh	Shaheed Suhrawardy Indoor Stadium, Dhaka
10:00 BST (UTC+6)	Scoring by quarter: 33–11, 26–15, 28–6, 19–9
		[Boxscore]

== Competitions history ==
=== Olympic Games ===
Basketball at the Olympic Games records
Host	Round	Position	GP	W	L
(Nazi Germany) 1936	Part of Pakistan				
(United Kingdom) 1948	Part of Pakistan				
(Finland) 1952	Part of Pakistan				
(Australia) 1956	Part of Pakistan				
(Italy) 1960	Part of Pakistan				
(Japan) 1964	Part of Pakistan				
(Mexico) 1968	Part of Pakistan				
(West Germany) 1972	Did not qualify				
(Canada) 1976	Did not qualify				
(Soviet Union) 1980	Did not qualify				
(United States) 1984	Did not qualify				
(South Korea) 1988	Did not qualify				
(Spain) 1992	Did not qualify				
(United States) 1996	Did not qualify				
(Australia) 2000	Did not qualify				
(Greece) 2004	Did not qualify				
(China) 2008	Did not qualify				
(United Kingdom) 2012	Did not qualify				
(Brazil) 2016	Did not qualify				
(Japan) 2020	Did not qualify				
(France) 2024	Did not qualify				
(United States) 2028	To be determined				
Total	0/21	0 Title	0	0	0

=== FIBA World Cup ===
FIBA World Cup records
Host/Year	Round	Position	GP	Won	Lost
(Argentina) 1950	Did not participate/Part of Pakistan				
(Brazil) 1954	Did not participate/Part of Pakistan				
(Chile) 1959	Did not participate/Part of Pakistan				
(Brazil) 1963	Did not participate/Part of Pakistan				
(Uruguay) 1967	Did not participate/Part of Pakistan				
(Socialist Federal Republic of Yugoslavia) 1970	Did not participate/Part of Pakistan				
(Puerto Rico) 1974	Did not qualify				
(Philippines) 1978	Did not qualify				
(Colombia) 1982	Did not qualify				
(Spain) 1986	Did not qualify				
(Argentina) 1990	Did not qualify				
(Canada) 1994	Did not qualify				
(Greece) 1998	Did not qualify				
(United States) 2002	Did not qualify				
(Japan) 2006	Did not qualify				
(Turkey) 2010	Did not qualify				
(Spain) 2014	Did not qualify				
(China) 2019	Did not qualify				
(Indonesia) (Japan) (Philippines) 2023	Did not qualify				
(Qatar) 2027	Did not qualify				
(France) 2031	To be determined				
Total	0/20	0 Title	0	0	0

=== FIBA Asia Cup ===
FIBA Asia Cup records
Host/Year	Round	Position	GP	Won	Lost
(Philippines) 1960	Did not participate Part of Pakistan				
(Taiwan) 1963	Did not participate Part of Pakistan				
(Malaysia) 1965	Did not participate Part of Pakistan				
(South Korea) 1967	Did not participate Part of Pakistan				
(Thailand) 1969	Did not participate Part of Pakistan				
(Japan) 1971	Did not participate Part of Pakistan				
(Philippines) 1973	Not a FIBA member				
(Thailand) 1975	Not a FIBA member				
(Malaysia) 1977	Not a FIBA member				
(Japan) 1979	Group stage	13th place	8	0	8
(India) 1981	Did not enter				
(Hong Kong) 1983	Did not enter				
(Malaysia) 1985	Did not enter				
(Thailand) 1987	Did not enter				
(China) 1989	Group stage	15th place	6	0	6
(Japan) 1991	Did not enter				
(Indonesia) 1993	Group stage	18th place	5	0	5
(South Korea) 1995	Did not enter				
(Saudi Arabia) 1997	Group stage	15th place	6	0	6
(Japan) 1999	Did not enter				
(China) 2001	Did not enter				
(China) 2003	Did not qualify				
(Qatar) 2005	Did not qualify				
(Japan) 2007	Did not enter				
(China) 2009	Did not enter				
(China) 2011	Did not qualify				
(Philippines) 2013	Did not enter				
(China) 2015	Did not qualify				
(Lebanon) 2017	Did not qualify				
(Indonesia) 2022	Did not qualify				
(Saudi Arabia) 2025	Did not qualify				
Total	4/31	0 Title	25	0	25

=== FIBA Asia Cup qualification ===
FIBA Asia Cup Qualifiers records
Host/Year	Round	Position	GP	Won	Lost
(Bangladesh) 2022	DNQ	5/5	8	3	5
(Palestine) 2025	Withdrew				
Total	2/2	0 Title	8	3	5

=== SABA Championship ===
SABA Championship records
Host/Year	Round	Position	GP	Won	Lost
(India) 2002	Runners-up	2/7	The full data of the tournament have not been found		
(India) 2013	Champion	1/7	The full data of the tournament have not been found		
(Nepal) 2014	Runners-up	2/5	4	3	1
(India) 2015	Round robin	4/6	5	2	3
(India) 2016	Round robin	4/4	3	1	2
(Maldives) 2017	Runner-up	2/5	4	3	1
(Bangladesh) 2021	Round robin	3/4	3	1	2
Total	7/7	1 Title	19	10	9

=== Islamic Solidarity Games ===
Islamic Solidarity Games records
Host/Year	Round	Position	GP	Won	Lost
(Saudi Arabia) 2005	Did not participate				
(Iran) 2010	Tournament did not held				
(Indonesia) 2013	Did not participate				
(Azerbaijan) 2017	Did not participate				
(Turkey) 2021	Did not participate				
(Saudi Arabia) 2025	Did not participate				
Total	0/5	0 Title	0	0	0
