= SABA Championship =

Basketball tournament

- Sport: Basketball
- Founded: 2002
- Country: SABA member nations
- Continent: FIBA Asia (Asia)
- Most recent champion: India (6th title)
- Most titles: India (6 titles)

The SABA Championship is a basketball tournament for national teams organized by the South Asia Basketball Association, a sub-zone of the FIBA Asia. It serves as a qualifier for various FIBA Asia events such as the FIBA Asia Championship and the FIBA Asia Cup.

Starting immediately at the end of the 2019 FIBA Basketball World Cup, a new qualification format for 2021 FIBA Asia Cup, and for every continental championships thereafter, has been introduced, wherein home and away games will be done during the pre-qualifiers in order to determine the participants for the main qualifiers that will battle for the 16 berths of the continental championships.

== Summary ==
Year	Host	Final			Third-place game		
Year	Host	Champion	Score	Second Place	Third Place	Score	Fourth Place
2002; Details	(India); Guwahati	India	No playoffs	Bangladesh		No playoffs	
2013; Details	(Bangladesh); Dhaka	Bangladesh	No playoffs	Pakistan	Nepal	No playoffs	Maldives
2014; Details	(Nepal); Kathmandu	India	No playoffs	Bangladesh	Sri Lanka	No playoffs	Nepal
2015; Details	(India); Bengaluru	India	No playoffs	Sri Lanka	Nepal	No playoffs	Bangladesh
2016; Details	(India); Bengaluru	India	No playoffs	Maldives	Nepal	No playoffs	Bangladesh
2017; Details	(Maldives); Malé	India	No playoffs	Bangladesh	Sri Lanka	No playoffs	Nepal
2018; Details	(Bangladesh); Dhaka	Sri Lanka	No playoffs	Bangladesh	Maldives	No playoffs	Bhutan
2021; Details	(Bangladesh); Dhaka	India	No playoffs	Sri Lanka	Bangladesh	No playoffs	Maldives

== Medal table ==
Rank	Nation	Gold	Silver	Bronze	Total
1	India	6	0	0	6
2	Bangladesh	1	4	1	6
3	Sri Lanka	1	2	2	5
4	Nepal	0	1	2	3
5	Maldives	0	1	1	2
6	Pakistan	0	1	0	1
Totals (6 entries)		8	9	6	23

== See also ==
- SABA Women's Championship
- FIBA Asia Cup
- Basketball at the Asian Games
- Basketball at the South Asian Games
- SAFF Championship
- CAVA Men's Volleyball Nations League
