= 2015 SABA Championship =

4th South Asian Basketball Championship

Tournament details
- Host country: India
- Dates: 3–5 July
- Teams: 6 (from 8 federations)
- Venue: 1 (in 1 host city)

Final positions
- Champions: India (3rd title)
- PPG (Team): India (110.4)

The 2015 SABA Championship was the 4th SABA Championship, and the qualifying event in the SABA subzone, one of the FIBA Asia's subzone for the 2015 FIBA Asia Championship. The games were held from 3 July to 5 July in Bengaluru, India. The tournament was originally set to be hosted in Bangladesh.

India successfully defended their title by sweeping the entire tournament. Winning their third overall SABA Championship title, they also got the only slot for South Asia subzone en route to the 2015 FIBA Asia Championship. Sri Lanka finished second and Nepal ended third, wherein they improved their finishes in this edition compared to their positions in the 2014 SABA Championship.

On 13 June, the Indian Ministry of Sports called for all basketball tournaments in India including the SABA Championship to be put on hold following a leadership dispute at the Indian Basketball Federation. By 28 June, the faction led by K. Govindraj, which has been approved by FIBA, secured a court order from the Karnataka High Court to host the tournament as planned.

== Venue ==
The Kanteerava Indoor Stadium is set to host the games.

Bengaluru
Kanteerava Indoor Stadium	2015 SABA Championship (India)
Capacity: 4,000	2015 SABA Championship (India)

== Standings ==
Pos	Team	Pld	W	L	PF	PA	PD	Pts	Qualification
1	India (C, H, Q)	5	5	0	552	220	+332	10	Qualification to 2015 FIBA Asia Championship
2	Sri Lanka	5	4	1	392	347	+45	9	
3	Nepal	5	2	3	332	370	−38	7 (Note: 1–1 head-to-head, 1.06 goal average vs. Bangladesh and Maldives)	
4	Bangladesh	5	2	3	334	424	−90	7 (Note: 1–1 head-to-head, 0.99 goal average vs. Nepal and Maldives)	
5	Maldives	5	2	3	348	419	−71	7 (Note: 1–1 head-to-head, 0.95 goal average vs. Nepal and Bangladesh)	
6	Bhutan	5	0	5	292	470	−178	5	

Rules for classification: (1) Tournament points, (2) Head-to-head tournament points, (3) Head-to-head goal average, (4) Overall goal average, (5) Drawing of lots
(C) Champions; (H) Hosts; (Q) Qualified for the phase indicated

== Results ==
3 July 2015
8:00

Recap

Bangladesh	76–65	Maldives
Scoring by quarter: 22–9, 17–11, 15–15, 22–30
Pts: Sarkan 24

Kanteerava Indoor Stadium, Bengaluru

3 July 2015
9:45

Recap

Nepal	37–90	India
Scoring by quarter: 10–29, 10–21, 10–23, 7–17
Pts: Mathema 10; Rebs: Maharjan 6 Asts: Pradhan 3		Pts: Grewal 17; Rebs: Arvind 10; Asts: P. Singh 3

Kanteerava Indoor Stadium, Bengaluru

3 July 2015
11:00

Recap

Sri Lanka	100–57	Bhutan
Scoring by quarter: 31–14, 18–13, 31–9, 20–21
Pts: Udumalagala 28		Pts: Wangchuk 28

Kanteerava Indoor Stadium, Bengaluru

3 July 2015
17:00

Recap

India	122–39	Bangladesh
Scoring by quarter: 29–4, 30–8, 36–8, 27–19
Pts: Arvind 19; Rebs: Pethani 11; Asts: Akhilan 8		Pts: Sarkan 12; Rebs: Aziz 6 Asts: Mohammad, Aziz 2

Kanteerava Indoor Stadium, Bengaluru

3 July 2015
18:30

Recap

Nepal	72–58	Bhutan

Kanteerava Indoor Stadium, Bengaluru

4 July 2015
8:00

Recap

Sri Lanka	92–66	Maldives
Scoring by quarter: 19–12, 17–17, 25–22, 31–15
Pts: Udumalagala 28		Pts: Aushan 28

Kanteerava Indoor Stadium, Bengaluru

4 July 2015
9:30

Recap

Nepal	87–74	Bangladesh

Kanteerava Indoor Stadium, Bengaluru

4 July 2015
11:00

Recap

India	119–52	Bhutan
Scoring by quarter: 39–6, 20–20, 33–16, 26–10
Pts: G. Singh 20		Pts: Dorji 14

Kanteerava Indoor Stadium, Bengaluru

4 July 2015
17:00

Recap

Bangladesh	63–80	Sri Lanka
Scoring by quarter: 21–20, 14–15, 16–23, 12–22
Pts: Biswas 20; Rebs: Biswas 13; Asts: Biswas 3		Pts: Udumalagala 26; Rebs: Ahamed 11; Asts: Dhanawansa, Sooriyaarachchi 4

Kanteerava Indoor Stadium, Bengaluru

4 July 2015
18:30

Recap

Maldives	72–68	Nepal

Kanteerava Indoor Stadium, Bengaluru

5 July 2015
8:00

Recap

Bangladesh	82–70	Bhutan

Kanteerava Indoor Stadium, Bengaluru

5 July 2015
9:30

Recap

India	128–48	Maldives
Scoring by quarter: 28–8, 39–10, 34–16, 27–14
Pts: Venkatesh 26		Pts: Latheef 14

Kanteerava Indoor Stadium, Bengaluru

5 July 2015
11:00

Recap

Sri Lanka	76–68	Nepal
Scoring by quarter: 18–23, 18–17, 22–15, 18–14
Pts: Sooriyaarachchi 16		Pts: Singh 14

Kanteerava Indoor Stadium, Bengaluru

5 July 2015
17:30

Recap

Sri Lanka	44–93	India
Scoring by quarter: 13–22, 13–24, 10–29, 8–18
Pts: Udumalagala 13; Rebs: De Croos 6 Asts: Sooriyaarachchi 3		Pts: Annadurai 22; Rebs: Annadurai 13; Asts: J. Singh, Annadurai 4

Kanteerava Indoor Stadium, Bengaluru

5 July 2015
18:30

Recap

Maldives	97–55	Bhutan

Kanteerava Indoor Stadium, Bengaluru

== Final rankings ==
Rank	Team
Gold medal	India
Silver medal	Sri Lanka
Bronze medal	Nepal
4	Bangladesh
5	Maldives
6	Bhutan

== Awards ==
2015 SABA champions

India
Third title
