= 2016 SABA Championship =

5th South Asian Basketball Championship

Tournament details
- Host country: India
- Dates: 6–8 July
- Teams: 4 (from 8 federations)
- Venue: 1 (in 1 host city)

Final positions
- Champions: India (4th title)

Tournament statistics
- Top scorer: (Nepal) Pradhan (17.0)
- Top rebounds: (Nepal) Joshi (7.0)
- Top assists: (India) Bhriguvanshi (5.0)
- PPG (Team): India (90.7)
- RPG (Team): India (34.3)
- APG (Team): India (21.0)

The 2016 SABA Championship was the 5th SABA Championship, and the qualifying event in the SABA subzone, one of the FIBA Asia's subzone for the 2016 FIBA Asia Challenge. The games were held from 6 July to 8 July in Bengaluru, India.

India successfully defended their title by sweeping the tournament, 3–0, winning the subzone title and the subzone's lone spot for the main tournament.

After a three-way tie for the second spot, Maldives notched their first podium finish by winning the point differential against third-place Nepal and fourth-place Bangladesh.

== Venue ==
The Kanteerava Indoor Stadium was set to host the games for the second successive year.

Bengaluru
Kanteerava Indoor Stadium	2016 SABA Championship (India)
Capacity: 4,000	2016 SABA Championship (India)

== Standings ==
Pos	Team	Pld	W	L	PF	PA	PD	Pts	Qualification
1	India (C, H, Q)	3	3	0	272	128	+144	6	Qualification to 2016 FIBA Asia Challenge
2	Maldives	3	1	2	162	208	−46	4 (Note: 1–1 head-to-head, 1.08 goal average vs. Nepal and Bangladesh)	
3	Nepal	3	1	2	186	208	−22	4 (Note: 1–1 head-to-head, 1.05 goal average vs. Bangladesh and Maldives)	
4	Bangladesh	3	1	2	158	234	−76	4 (Note: 1–1 head-to-head, 0.88 goal average vs. Nepal and Maldives)	

Rules for classification: (1) Tournament points, (2) Head-to-head tournament points, (3) Head-to-head goal average, (4) Overall goal average, (5) Drawing of lots
(C) Champions; (H) Hosts; (Q) Qualified for the phase indicated

== Results ==
6 July 2016
17:00

Box Scores

India	81–53	Nepal
Scoring by quarter: 23–4, 17–21, 21–8, 20–20
Pts: Bhriguvanshi 11; Rebs: Singh, Pethani 5 Asts: Bhriguvanshi 4		Pts: Pradhan 13; Rebs: S. Shrestha, Maharjan, A. Shrestha 5 Asts: Sonam, Singh 1

Kanteerava Indoor Stadium, Bengaluru

6 July 2016
18:30

Box Scores

Bangladesh	50–68	Maldives
Scoring by quarter: 12–14, 14–9, 9–21, 15–24
Pts: M. A. Rahman 10; Rebs: M. A. Rahman 7 Asts: Biswas 3		Pts: Rashad, Zabeer 14; Rebs: Zilaal 4 Asts: Zilaal, Shareef 3

Kanteerava Indoor Stadium, Bengaluru

7 July 2016
17:00

Box Scores

Nepal	71–73	Bangladesh
Scoring by quarter: 16–18, 13–11, 20–21, 22–23
Pts: Pradhan 26; Rebs: Maharjan 8 Asts: Sonam 4		Pts: Biswas, M. A. Rahman 22; Rebs: M. A. Rahman 10; Asts: Khan, Biswas 2

Kanteerava Indoor Stadium, Bengaluru

7 July 2016
18:30

Box Scores

Maldives	40–96	India
Scoring by quarter: 5–23, 9–28, 19–23, 7–22
Pts: Yoosuf 9 Rebs: Rashad, Abdulla, Shareef 4 Asts: Fazlee, Abdulla, Zabeer 1		Pts: Shahi 15; Rebs: Aravind 10; Asts: Bhriguvanshi 7

Kanteerava Indoor Stadium, Bengaluru

8 July 2016
17:00

Box Scores

Maldives	54–62	Nepal
Scoring by quarter: 14–13, 18–17, 11–13, 11–19
Pts: Latheef, Zilaal 10; Rebs: Zabeer 7 Asts: Zabeer 3		Pts: A. Shrestha, Singh 15; Rebs: Joshi 12; Asts: Sonam 3

Kanteerava Indoor Stadium, Bengaluru

8 July 2016
18:30

Box Scores

India	95–35	Bangladesh
Scoring by quarter: 36–13, 24–8, 19–8, 16–6
Pts: Bhriguvanshi 16; Rebs: Aravind 7 Asts: Shahi 15		Pts: Biswas 8 Rebs: Hossian, M. A. Rahman 2 Asts: Khan 3

Kanteerava Indoor Stadium, Bengaluru

== Final rankings ==
Rank	Team
Gold medal	India
Silver medal	Maldives
Bronze medal	Nepal
4	Bangladesh

== Awards ==
2016 SABA champions

India
Fourth title
