= 2017 SABA Championship =

6th South Asian Basketball Championship
- Official logo of the 2017 SABA Championship

Tournament details
- Host country: Maldives
- Dates: 19–23 May
- Teams: 5 (from 8 federations)
- Venue: 1 (in 1 host city)

Final positions
- Champions: India (5th title)

The 2017 SABA Championship is the 6th SABA Championship, and the qualifying event in the SABA sub-zone, one of the FIBA Asia's subzone for the 2017 FIBA Asia Cup and 2019 FIBA Basketball World Cup Asian Qualifiers. The games were held from 19 to 23 May in Malé, Maldives. India successfully defended their SABA crown after sweeping the whole tournament. With this win, they qualified for the 2017 FIBA Asia Cup and the first round of the 2019 FIBA Basketball World Cup Asian Qualifiers. The tournament followed a single round robin format.

This tournaments marked the first time the Maldives hosted an international basketball tournament. Aside from the hosts, India, Sri Lanka, Nepal, and Bangladesh participated in the tournament.

== Standings ==
Pos	Team	Pld	W	L	PF	PA	PD	Pts	Qualification
1	India (C, Q)	4	4	0	404	218	+186	8	Qualified to 2017 FIBA Asia Cup and 2019 FIBA Basketball World Cup Asian Qualifiers
2	Bangladesh	4	3	1	323	340	−17	7	
3	Sri Lanka	4	1	3	285	312	−27	5 (Note: Considering these teams have 1–1 records against each other; When the quotient system is used, Sri Lanka win the bronze medal as they have an average of 0.913 against 0.771 of Nepal and 0.755 of Maldives.)	
4	Nepal	4	1	3	236	306	−70	5	
5	Maldives (H)	4	1	3	222	294	−72	5	

Updated to match(es) played on 23 May 2017. Source:
Rules for classification: (1) Tournament points, (2) Head-to-head tournament points, (3) Head-to-head goal average, (4) Overall goal average, (5) Drawing of lots
(C) Champions; (H) Hosts; (Q) Qualified for the phase indicated

== Results ==
All times are in Maldivian Time (UTC+05:00)

19 May 2017
17:00

Report

Bangladesh	76–66	Nepal
Scoring by quarter: 22–14, 17–18, 23–20, 14–14

Maldives Centre For Social Education Youth Center, Malé

19 May 2017
21:00

Report

India	84–42	Maldives
Scoring by quarter: 22–3, 24–12, 22–13, 16–14
Pts: Am. Singh 25		Pts: Zilaal 12

Maldives Centre For Social Education Youth Center, Malé

20 May 2017
17:00

Report

Bangladesh	90–80	Sri Lanka
Scoring by quarter: 25–28, 25–18, 24–20, 16–14

Maldives Centre For Social Education Youth Center, Malé

20 May 2017
21:00

Report

Nepal	61–59	Maldives
Scoring by quarter: 16–16, 13–20, 20–13, 12–10

Maldives Centre For Social Education Youth Center, Malé

21 May 2017
17:00

Report

Sri Lanka	61–88	India
Scoring by quarter: 17–23, 17–27, 15–16, 12–22
Pts: Perera 18		Pts: Am. Singh 28

Maldives Centre For Social Education Youth Center, Malé

21 May 2017
21:00

Report

Maldives	52–86	Bangladesh
Scoring by quarter: 9–12, 8–29, 9–19, 26–26

Maldives Centre For Social Education Youth Center, Malé

22 May 2017
17:00

Report

India	142–71	Bangladesh
Scoring by quarter: 36–9, 32–20, 45–13, 29–29
Pts: Am. Singh 22		Pts: Biswas 25

Maldives Centre For Social Education Youth Center, Malé

22 May 2017
21:00

Report

Sri Lanka	81–65	Nepal
Scoring by quarter: 23–20, 19–15, 16–9, 23–21

Maldives Centre For Social Education Youth Center, Malé

23 May 2017
17:00

Report

Nepal	44–90	India
Scoring by quarter: 6–25, 7–20, 13–45, 18–19
Pts: Shrestha 9		Pts: Bhriguvanshi 22

Maldives Centre For Social Education Youth Center, Malé

23 May 2017
21:00

Report

Maldives	69–63	Sri Lanka
Scoring by quarter: 21–11, 23–22, 12–17, 13–13

Maldives Centre For Social Education Youth Center, Malé

== Final rankings ==
Qualified for: 2017 FIBA Asia Cup; Round 1 of the 2019 FIBA Basketball World Cup Asian Qualifiers

Rank	Team
1st place, gold medalist(s)	India
2nd place, silver medalist(s)	Bangladesh
3rd place, bronze medalist(s)	Sri Lanka
4th	Nepal
5th	Maldives
