= Basketball at the South Asian Games =

Basketball has been a part of the South Asian Games since the 1987 edition.

== Results ==
=== Men's tournament ===
1987; Details	India (Kolkata)	India		Pakistan			
1991; Details	Sri Lanka (Colombo)	India		Pakistan			
1995; Details	India (Madras)	India		Pakistan			
2010; Details	Bangladesh (Dhaka)	Afghanistan	65–64	India	Bangladesh	75–62	Nepal
2019; Details	Nepal (Kathmandu)	India	101–62	Sri Lanka	Nepal	81–59	Bangladesh

=== Women's tournament ===
2019; Details	Nepal (Kathmandu)	India	127–46	Nepal	Maldives	83–46	Bhutan

== Medal table ==
Rank	Nation	Gold	Silver	Bronze	Total
1	IND	4	1	0	5
2	AFG	1	0	0	1
3	PAK	0	3	0	3
4	BAN	0	0	1	1
4	NEP	0	0	1	1
Totals (5 entries)		5	4	2	11

== Performance record ==
Team	(India); 1987	(Sri Lanka); 1991	(India); 1995	(Bangladesh); 2010	(India); 2016	Total
Afghanistan	-	-	-	1st		1
Bangladesh	?	?	?	3rd		≥1
Bhutan	-	-	-	-		0
India	1st	1st	1st	2nd		4
Maldives	-	?	?	?		?
Nepal	-	-	?	4th		≥1
Pakistan	2nd	2nd	2nd	?		4
Sri Lanka	?	?	?	?		≥1
