= 2014 SABA Championship =

3rd South Asian Basketball Championship
- Official logo of the 2014 SABA Championship

Tournament details
- Host country: Nepal
- Dates: May 13–17
- Teams: 5
- Venue(s): 1 (in 1 host city)

Final positions
- Champions: India (2nd title)
- PPG (Team): India (93.0)

The 2014 SABA Championship is the 3rd SABA Championship, and the qualifying event in the South Asia Basketball Association subzone, one of the FIBA Asia's subzone for the 2014 FIBA Asia Cup. The games were held from May 13 to May 17 in Kathmandu, Nepal.

India won their second SABA title after sweeping the whole tournament, thus clinching the lone spot for SABA in the 2014 FIBA Asia Cup.

== Round robin ==
Pos	Team	Pld	W	L	PF	PA	PD	Pts	Qualification
1	India (C, Q)	4	4	0	372	142	+230	8	Qualified to the 2014 FIBA Asia Cup
2	Bangladesh	4	3	1	267	310	−43	7	
3	Sri Lanka	4	2	2	272	310	−38	6	
4	Nepal (H)	4	1	3	288	323	−35	5	
5	Maldives	4	0	4	270	384	−114	4	

Source: FIBA
Rules for classification: a) Head-to-head results b) Drawing of lots c) Goal average
(C) Champions; (H) Hosts; (Q) Qualified for the phase indicated

May 13
14:10

Recap^{[usurped]}

Nepal	108–89	Maldives
Scoring by quarter: 28–23, 28–20, 25–12, 27–34

National Sports Council Covered Hall, Kathmandu

May 13
17:00

Recap^{[usurped]}

Bangladesh	72–70	Sri Lanka
Scoring by quarter: 24–19, 11–21, 22–14, 15–16

National Sports Council Covered Hall, Kathmandu

May 14
14:10

Recap^{[usurped]}

Sri Lanka	80–66	Nepal
Scoring by quarter: 20–19, 18–15, 18–14, 24–18

National Sports Council Covered Hall, Kathmandu

May 14
17:00

Recap^{[usurped]}

Bangladesh	39–93	India
Scoring by quarter: 8–19, 13–32, 7–27, 11–15

National Sports Council Covered Hall, Kathmandu

May 15
14:10

Recap^{[usurped]}

India	97–30	Sri Lanka
Scoring by quarter: 20–4, 26–9, 21–7, 30–10

National Sports Council Covered Hall, Kathmandu

May 15
17:00

Recap^{[usurped]}

Maldives	74–76	Bangladesh
Scoring by quarter: 16–21, 21–20, 18–22, 19–21

National Sports Council Covered Hall, Kathmandu

May 16
14:10

Recap^{[usurped]}

India	74–41	Nepal
Scoring by quarter: 22–6, 15–17, 21–10, 16–8

National Sports Council Covered Hall, Kathmandu

May 16
17:00

Recap^{[usurped]}

Sri Lanka	92–75	Maldives
Scoring by quarter: 16–17, 28–19, 29–13, 19–26

National Sports Council Covered Hall, Kathmandu

May 17
11:00

Recap^{[usurped]}

Maldives	32–108	India
Scoring by quarter: 10–35, 6–29, 3–31, 13–13

National Sports Council Covered Hall, Kathmandu

May 17
14:10

Recap^{[usurped]}

Nepal	73–80	Bangladesh
Scoring by quarter: 13–22, 15–15, 15–18, 30–25

National Sports Council Covered Hall, Kathmandu

== Final standings ==
Rank	Team
Gold medal	India
Silver medal	Bangladesh
Bronze medal	Sri Lanka
4	Nepal
5	Maldives

== Awards ==
2014 SABA champions

India
Second title
