= Kanteerava Indoor Stadium =

Sporting arena in Bangalore, India

Sri Kanteerava Indoor Stadium
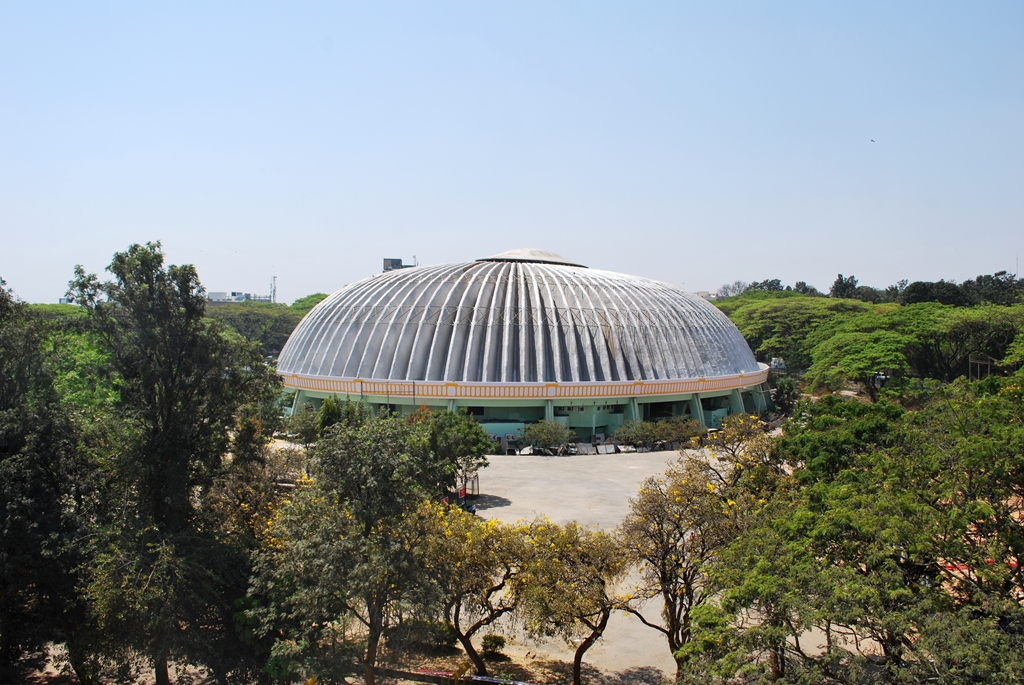
- Interactive map of Sri Kanteerava Indoor Stadium
- Full name: Shree Kanteerava Indoor Stadium
- Location: Bengaluru, India
- Coordinates: 12°58′7.75″N 77°35′28.71″E
- Owner: Karnataka Athletic Association
- Capacity: 4,000
- Field size: 120m x 90m
- Public transit: Purple at Cubbon Park

Construction
- Built: 1995
- Opened: 1997
- Architects: Sundaram Consultants, Bangalore

Tenants
- Bengaluru Bulls; Bengaluru Beast; Bengaluru FC Futsal

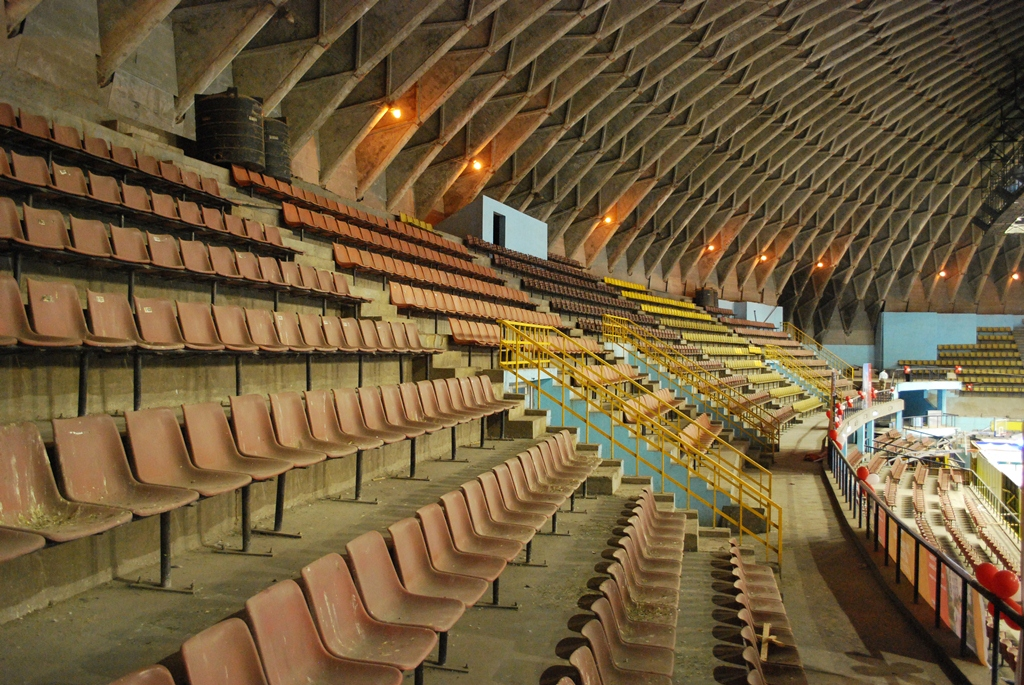
Interior view of Stadium

Kanteerava Indoor Stadium, also known as the Sree or Sri Kanteerava Indoor Stadium, is an indoor sporting arena located in Bengaluru, India, near Cubbon Park. The capacity of the arena is 4,000 people. Sampangi Lake was changed to create this sports complex. The design uses an elliptical dome.

It has hosted the SABA Championship in 2015 and 2016. India's national basketball team won the gold medal on both occasions.

== Structure ==
There are 8 entrances to the stadium, of which five are for public, one for the VIPs, one for stadium officials and one for players. The stadium has an elliptical dome consisting of 120 folded plates (precast) of varying cross-section (average 2m) with the plate thickness of 40mm and series of inter-connected ribs. The lower end of the dome is supported on the elliptical ring beam at 8m level which in-turn is supported on 24 equally spaced arch columns. The top of the dome is supported on elliptical ring of 16m x 8m at 29m level. A small elliptical paraboloid in-situ dome of 4m height and having a series of interconnected stiffeners is resting on the top ring. The folded plate spans about 40m between the two rings. The seating galleries are precast while the other cubicles are in-situ.

== See also ==
- Sree Kanteerava Stadium
- Bangalore Football Stadium
