= Peking University Gymnasium =

Sports venue in Beijing, China

Coordinates: 39°59′13″N 116°18′32″E

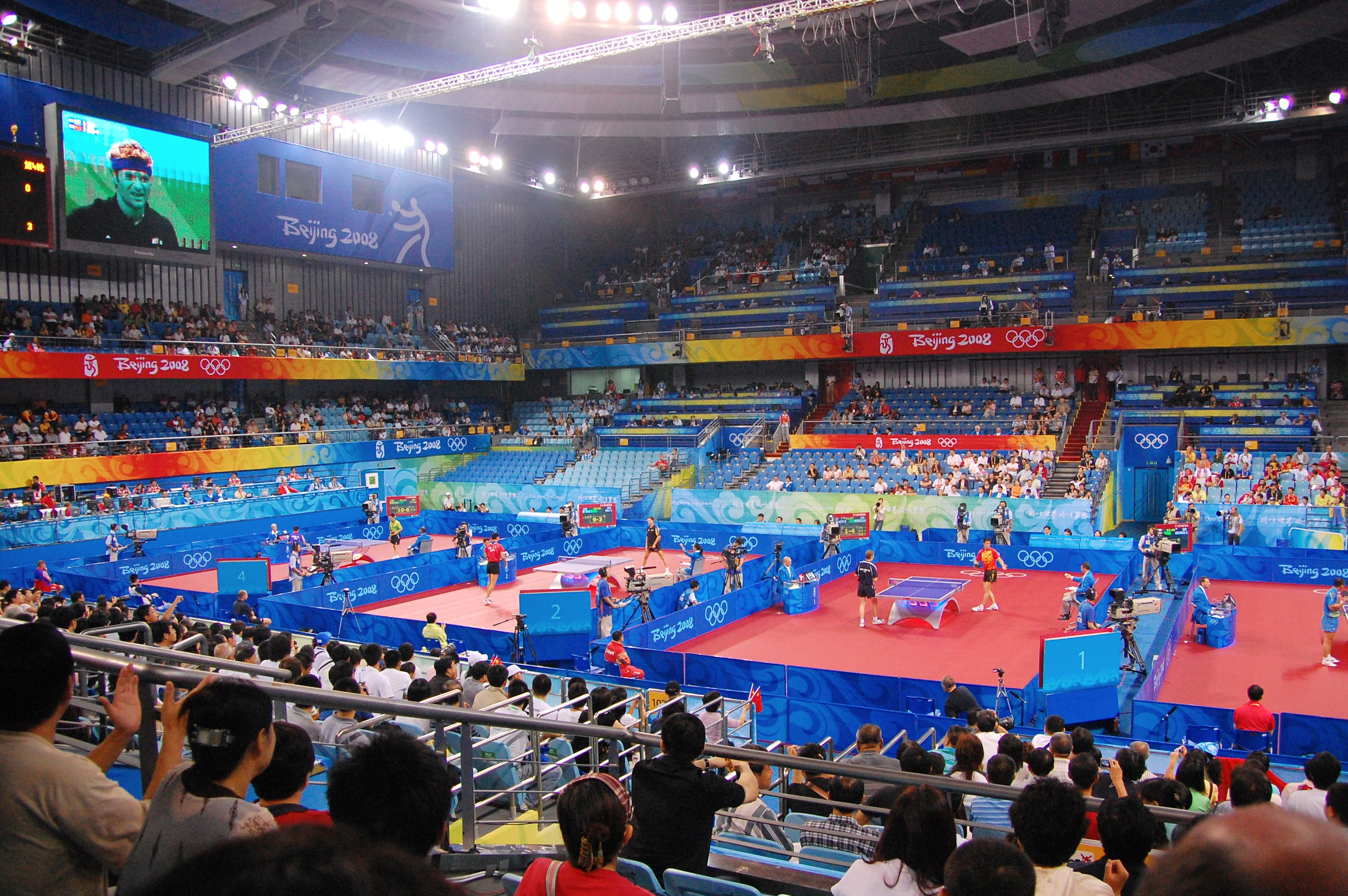
Peking University Gymnasium during the 2008 Summer Olympics

Peking University Gymnasium (simplified Chinese: 北京大学体育馆; traditional Chinese: 北京大學體育館; pinyin: Běijīng Dàxué Tǐyùguǎn), nicknamed China's Spine (simplified Chinese: 中国脊; traditional Chinese: 中國脊; pinyin: Zhōngguó Jǐ), is an indoor arena located in the southeastern part of Peking University in Beijing, China. The gymnasium was constructed for the table tennis events of the 2008 Summer Olympics and the Paralympics.

The gymnasium has a floor space of 26,900 m^{2}, 6,000 permanent seats and 2,000 temporary seats. It was completed in August 2007. In November 2011, Khoo Teck Puat donated about 173 million RMB to Peking University for the construction and the gymnasium was entitled 'Khoo Teck Puat Gymnasium'.

After the Olympics, the gymnasium was renovated between September 2010 to October 2011. The gymnasium has become a sport complex which includes fitness club, swimming pool and courts and facilities for a variety of sports including badminton, table tennis, squash and billiards. The gymnasium has also hosted a number of events including the Best Ten Singer Competitions of Peking University (十佳歌手) and Graduation Commercements.
