= Maldives Basketball Association =

Governing body for basketball in the Maldives

- Official logo
- Founded: 1991
- Affiliation: FIBA
- Affiliation date: 1991
- Headquarters: Boalhage, 3rd Floor, Abadhad Ufaa Magu, Henveiru, Malé, Maldives
- President: Ahmed Adam
- Vice president: Hussain Suhail

Official website
- mba.org.mv (defunct)

The Maldives Basketball Association, more popularly known as the MBA, was founded on the 12 August 1991. Since its inception, MBA has been actively involved in developing basketball in the Maldives.

Basketball is one of the most widely played sports in the Maldives, ranking behind football in popularity. The Maldives Basketball Association (MBA) has sought to promote the sport throughout the country through development programs, training clinics, and affiliations with international basketball organizations. The association has also organized national competitions aimed at expanding participation beyond the capital region. The introduction of the Inter Atoll Tournament marked the first nationwide competition involving teams from multiple atolls, reflecting the sport's growing presence across the archipelago despite logistical challenges associated with providing facilities and technical support across the Maldives' geographically dispersed islands.

One of the biggest challenges facing MBA is the lack of opportunities to play international basketball due to the very few tournaments held at international level in this region.
