= Nepal men's national basketball team =

Nepal
- FIBA ranking: NR (13 July 2026)
- Joined FIBA: 2000
- FIBA zone: FIBA Asia
- National federation: Nepal Basketball Association
- Coach: Sushil Gurung

Olympic Games
- Appearances: None

FIBA World Cup
- Appearances: None

FIBA Asia Cup
- Appearances: None

SABA Championship
- Appearances: 3
- Medals: Bronze: 2013, 2015
Home	Away

The Nepal national basketball team represents Nepal in international basketball competitions and is managed by the Nepal Basketball Association (NeBA). (Nepali: नेपाल बास्केटबल संघ)

Nepal joined the International Federation of Basketball (FIBA) in 2000 and is Asia's youngest member. Already, the team has succeeded at the regional level as it won two bronze medals at the SABA Championship.

== Competitions ==
=== International ===
==== Olympic Games ====
Year	Round	Position	Pld	W	L
1936–2024	Did not enter				
Total		0/18	0	0	8

==== FIBA Basketball World Cup ====
Year	Round	Position	Pld	W	L
1950–2027	Did not enter				
(France) 2031	To be determined				
Total	0 Titles	0/21	0	0	0

=== FIBA Asia Cup ===
Year	Position	Pld	W	L
(Philippines) 1960 to (Japan) 1999	Not a FIBA member			
(China) 2001	Did not enter			
(China) 2003	Did not enter			
(Qatar) 2005	Did not enter			
(Japan) 2007	Did not enter			
(China) 2009	Did not enter			
(China) 2011	Did not qualify			
(Philippines) 2013	Did not qualify			
(China) 2015	Did not qualify			
(Lebanon) 2017	Did not qualify			
(Indonesia) 2022	Did not qualify			
(Saudi Arabia) 2025	Did not enter			
2029	Did not qualify			
Total	0/32	0	0	0

==== Asian Games ====
Year	Round	Position	Pld	W	L
(India) 1951 to (Thailand) 1998	Not affiliated to FIBA				
(South Korea) 2002 to (Japan) 2026	Did not enter				
Total		0/20	0	0	0

=== Asia Challenge ===
Year	Host	Position
2004	Taipei, Taiwan	Did not enter
2008	Kuwait City, Kuwait	Did not enter
2012	Tokyo, Japan	Did not enter
2014	Wuhan, China	Did not enter
2016	Tehran, Iran	Did not qualify

=== SABA Championship ===
SABA Championship
Year	Host city	Position
2002	Guwahati, India	Did not participate
2013	Dhaka, Bangladesh	3rd
2014	Kathmandu, Nepal	4th
2015	Bengaluru, India	3rd
2016	Bengaluru, India	3rd
2017	Male, Maldives	4th
2018	Dhaka, Bangladesh	5th
2021	Dhaka, Bangladesh	Did not participate

=== South Asian Games ===
South Asian Games
Year	Host city	Position
1987	Kolkata, India	Did not participate
1991	Colombo, Sri Lanka	Did not participate
1995	Chennai, India	Did not participate
2010	Dhaka, Bangladesh	4th
2019	Kathmandu, Nepal	3rd

== See also ==
- Nepal women's national basketball team
- Nepal national under-19 basketball team
- Nepal national under-17 basketball team
