= Maldives men's national basketball team =

Maldives
- FIBA ranking: NR (13 July 2026)
- Joined FIBA: 1997
- FIBA zone: FIBA Asia
- National federation: MBA
- Coach: Zilaal Mohamed

Olympic Games
- Appearances: None

FIBA World Cup
- Appearances: None

FIBA Asia Cup
- Appearances: None
Home	Away

The Maldives national basketball team represents Maldives in international basketball competitions and is controlled by Maldives Basketball Association.

== Current squad ==
2019 South Asian Games Squad

Maldives Men's National Basketball Team - 13th South Asian Games 2019 roster
Players
Coaches

Pos.	No.	Name	Age – Date of birth	Height	Club
F	4	Mohamed Evan Zahir	26 – February 28, 1993	1.83 m (6 ft 0 in)	Raptors Basketball Club	(Maldives)
G	5	Zakariya Abdul Latheef	38 – August 22, 1981	1.72 m (5 ft 8 in)	T-Rex Basketball Club	(Maldives)
G	6	Mohamed Zilaal	34 – April 27, 1985	1.74 m (5 ft 9 in)	Kings Basketball Club	(Maldives)
PG	7	Ali Fazlee	35 – January 18, 1984	1.72 m (5 ft 8 in)	T-Rex Basketball Club	(Maldives)
C	8	Hussain Haleem	25 – May 12, 1994	1.87 m (6 ft 2 in)	T-Rex Basketball Club	(Maldives)
G	9	Mafaz Mohamed	26 – April 27, 1993	1.73 m (5 ft 8 in)	Raptors Basketball Club	(Maldives)
F	10	Ibrahim Naseem	24 – May 28, 1995	1.76 m (5 ft 9 in)	Stingers Basketball Club	(Maldives)
G	11	Mohamed Khuwailid Ali	32 – May 14, 1987	1.73 m (5 ft 8 in)	Kings Basketball Club	(Maldives)
F	13	Ahmed Firash	32 – August 24, 1987	1.82 m (6 ft 0 in)	Kings Basketball Club	(Maldives)
G	15	Ibrahim Anfaal Shareef	30 – March 10, 1989	1.74 m (5 ft 9 in)	Kings Basketball Club	(Maldives)

Head coach

- (United States) Corey Belser

Assistant coach(es)

- (Maldives) Ali Isham

== Competitions ==
=== Performance at Summer Olympics ===
yet to qualify

=== Performance at World championships ===
yet to qualify

=== FIBA Asia Cup ===
Year	Position	Pld	W	L
(Philippines) 1960	Not a FIBA member			
(Taiwan) 1963	Not a FIBA member			
(Malaysia) 1965	Not a FIBA member			
(South Korea) 1967	Not a FIBA member			
(Thailand) 1969	Not a FIBA member			
(Japan) 1971	Not a FIBA member			
(Philippines) 1973	Not a FIBA member			
(Thailand) 1975	Not a FIBA member			
(Malaysia) 1977	Not a FIBA member			
(Japan) 1979	Not a FIBA member			
(India) 1981	Not a FIBA member			
(Hong Kong) 1983	Not a FIBA member			
(Malaysia) 1985	Not a FIBA member			
(Thailand) 1987	Not a FIBA member			
(China) 1989	Not a FIBA member			
(Japan) 1991	Not a FIBA member			
(Indonesia) 1993	Not a FIBA member			
(South Korea) 1995	Not a FIBA member			
(Saudi Arabia) 1997	Not a FIBA member			
(Japan) 1999	Did not enter			
(China) 2001	Did not enter			
(China) 2003	Did not enter			
(Qatar) 2005	Did not enter			
(Japan) 2007	Did not enter			
(China) 2009	Did not enter			
(China) 2011	Did not enter			
(Philippines) 2013	Did not enter			
(China) 2015	Did not qualify			
(Lebanon) 2017	Did not qualify			
(Indonesia) 2022	Did not qualify			
(Saudi Arabia) 2025	Did not enter			
2029	Did not qualify			
Total	0/32	0	0	0
