= 2021 SABA Championship =

8th SABA Championship

8th South Asian Basketball Championship

Tournament details
- Host country: Bangladesh
- Dates: 15–19 November
- Teams: 4
- Venue(s): 1 (in 1 host city)

Final positions
- Champions: India (6th title)

The 2021 SABA Championship was the 8th SABA Championship, and also known as Bangabandhu 6th South Asian Basketball Championship. The games were held from 15 to 19 November in Dhaka, Bangladesh. Aside from the host country, other confirmed participants are from India, Sri Lanka and Maldives.

India swept the tournament en route to their sixth overall subzone title and their first title after four years. Defending champions Sri Lanka finished second, followed by the hosts Bangladesh and Maldives.

== FIBA rankings ==
Here are the FIBA rankings of the participating teams prior to the start of the tournament (rankings as of 9 August 2021):

India - 78th (World Rank), 14th (Asian Rank)
Sri Lanka - 132nd (World Rank), 28th (Asian Rank)
Maldives - 142nd (World Rank), 31st (Asian Rank)
Bangladesh - 146th (World Rank), 33rd (Asian Rank)

== Standings ==
Pos	Team	Pld	W	L	PF	PA	PD	Pts	Qualification
1	India	3	3	0	308	120	+188	6	
2	Sri Lanka	3	2	1	192	215	−23	5	Qualified to 2025 FIBA Asia Cup Pre-Qualifiers
3	Bangladesh (H)	3	1	2	183	238	−55	4	Qualified to 2025 FIBA Asia Cup Pre-Qualifiers
4	Maldives	3	0	3	141	251	−110	3	

Rules for classification: (1) Tournament points, (2) Head-to-head tournament points, (3) Head-to-head goal average, (4) Overall goal average, (5) Drawing of lots
(H) Hosts

== Results ==
All times are in Bangladesh Standard Time (UTC+06:00)

15 November 2021
10:00

[Boxscore]

Bangladesh	56–67	Sri Lanka
Scoring by quarter: 15–14, 15–16, 15–11, 11–26

Shaheed Suhrawardy Indoor Stadium, Dhaka

16 November 2021
10:00

[Boxscore]

India	88–31	Maldives
Scoring by quarter: 26–4, 28–7, 17–11, 17–6

Shaheed Suhrawardy Indoor Stadium, Dhaka

17 November 2021
09:00

[Boxscore]

Sri Lanka	48–114	India
Scoring by quarter: 17–30, 15–28, 2–31, 14–25

Shaheed Suhrawardy Indoor Stadium, Dhaka

17 November 2021
11:00

[Boxscore]

Bangladesh	86–65	Maldives
Scoring by quarter: 25–10, 19–15, 16–21, 26–19

Shaheed Suhrawardy Indoor Stadium, Dhaka

18 November 2021
10:00

[Boxscore]

Maldives	45–77	Sri Lanka
Scoring by quarter: 8–21, 15–22, 9–17, 13–17

Shaheed Suhrawardy Indoor Stadium, Dhaka

19 November 2021
10:00

[Boxscore]

India	106–41	Bangladesh
Scoring by quarter: 33–11, 26–15, 28–6, 19–9

Shaheed Suhrawardy Indoor Stadium, Dhaka

== Final rankings ==
Rank	Team
Gold medal	India
Silver medal	Sri Lanka
Bronze medal	Bangladesh
4	Maldives

== Awards ==
2021 SABA champions

India
Sixth title
