= Sri Lanka men's national basketball team =

Sri Lanka
- FIBA ranking: 130 ▲1 (13 July 2026)
- Joined FIBA: 1959
- FIBA zone: FIBA Asia
- National federation: Sri Lanka Basketball Federation (SLBF)
- Coach: Roshan Sooriyaarachchi

Olympic Games
- Appearances: None

FIBA World Cup
- Appearances: None

FIBA Asia Cup
- Appearances: 7
- Medals: None
Home	Away

The Sri Lankan national basketball team represents Sri Lanka in international competitions. It is administered by the Sri Lanka Basketball Federation (SLBF). Until 1972 it was known as Ceylon national basketball team.

The team qualified for the Asian Basketball Championship 7 times and was among Asia's 12 top basketball teams in 1981.

== History ==
Basketball was first introduced to Sri Lanka in 1917 by an American, Walter Cammak. Ten years later in 1927, Ananda College was the first school to introduce basketball in Sri Lanka, causing other schools to follow. In 1958, the Ceylon Basketball Federation (CBF) was established and was consequently admitted into FIBA in 1959. Sri Lanka joined the Asian Basketball Confederation (ABC) in 1962, and has participated in most ABC competitions since.

== Team ==
=== Current roster ===
==== 2021 FIBA Asia Cup qualification ====
Opposition: Jordan (21 February)
Venue: Prince Hamza, Amman
Opposition: Palestine (24 February)
Venue: Arab American University, Jenin

Sri Lanka national basketball team – 2021 FIBA Asia Cup qualification roster
Players
Coaches

Pos.	No.	Name	Age – Date of birth	Height	Club	Ctr.
PG	3	Sinna Marakkalage Chanuka Shehan	23 – 22 January 1997	1.775 m (5 ft 10 in)		(Sri Lanka)
F	4	Shehan Perera	27 – 27 June 1992	1.93 m (6 ft 4 in)		(Sri Lanka)
F	5	Pawan Samira Milidduwa Gamage	23 – 24 October 1996	1.70 m (5 ft 7 in)		(Sri Lanka)
PG	7	Suriya Paramathypathy	17 – 28 June 2004	1.75 m (5 ft 9 in)		(Sri Lanka)
C	8	Kande Dasun Nilantha Mendis	21 – 10 December 1998	1.95 m (6 ft 5 in)		(Sri Lanka)
PG	10	Chanaka Senarath	24 – 12 May 1995	1.85 m (6 ft 1 in)		(Sri Lanka)
C	21	Fernando Nimesh	22 – 5 August 1997	1.85 m (6 ft 1 in)		(Sri Lanka)
	23	Sriyantha Senaka Kurukulasuriyage	33 – 18 April 1986	2.00 m (6 ft 7 in)		(Sri Lanka)
SF	24	Sasindu Gajanayake	22 – 19 August 1997	1.93 m (6 ft 4 in)		(Sri Lanka)
F	28	Nipun Kiriella	29 – 26 July 1990	1.82 m (6 ft 0 in)		(Sri Lanka)
C	69	Josheph Gayan	28 – 9 April 1991	2.00 m (6 ft 7 in)		(Sri Lanka)
PG	93	Clinton Stallone Thevakumar	27 – 29 January 1993	1.82 m (6 ft 0 in)		(Sri Lanka)

Head coach

- (Sri Lanka) Susil Shantha Udukumburage

Assistant coach(es)

- (Sri Lanka) Ranura Deepthi Nanayakkarawasam Midigaspage

Legend

- (C) Team captain
- Club – describes last
  club before the tournament
- Age – describes age
  on 21 February 2020

== Competitions ==
=== Summer Olympics ===
Yet to Qualify

=== World Championships ===
FIBA World Cup Record
Year	Position	Pld	W	L	Squad
(Argentina) 1950 – (Puerto Rico) 1974	did not enter				
(Philippines) 1978 – (Philippines) (Japan) (Indonesia) 2023	did not qualify				
(Qatar) 2027	did not qualify				
(France) 2031	To be determined				
Total	0/21	0	0	0	

=== FIBA Asia Cup ===
Year	Position	Pld	W	L
As Ceylon
(Philippines) 1960	Did not enter			
(Taiwan) 1963	Did not enter			
(Malaysia) 1965	Did not enter			
(South Korea) 1967	Did not enter			
(Thailand) 1969	Did not enter			
(Japan) 1971	Did not enter			
As Sri Lanka
(Philippines) 1973	Did not enter			
(Thailand) 1975	13th place	9	0	9
(Malaysia) 1977	14th place	9	0	9
(Japan) 1979	Did not enter			
(India) 1981	12th place	7	0	7
(Hong Kong) 1983	Did not enter			
(Malaysia) 1985	15th place	5	0	5
(Thailand) 1987	Did not enter			
(China) 1989	Did not enter			
(Japan) 1991	18th place	5	0	5
(Indonesia) 1993	Did not enter			
(South Korea) 1995	19th place	6	0	6
(Saudi Arabia) 1997	Did not enter			
(Japan) 1999	Did not enter			
(China) 2001	Did not enter			
(China) 2003	Did not qualify			
(Qatar) 2005	Did not enter			
(Japan) 2007	Did not qualify			
(China) 2009	16th place	5	0	5
(China) 2011	Did not qualify			
(Philippines) 2013	Did not enter			
(China) 2015	Did not qualify			
(Lebanon) 2017	Did not qualify			
(Indonesia) 2022	Did not qualify			
(Saudi Arabia) 2025	Did not qualify			
2029	To be determined			
Total	7/31	46	0	46

=== Asian Games ===
- 1966 : 10th
- 2018 : Did not Participate

=== South Asian Games ===
- 1995-2010 : ?
- 2019 : (silver)

=== FIBA South Asia Championship ===
- 2014 : (bronze)
- 2015 : (silver)
- 2017 : (bronze)
- 2018 : (gold)
- 2021 : (silver)

=== Lusophony Games ===
Never Participated

=== Commonwealth Games ===
Never Participated

== Head coach position ==
- Ajit Kuruppu (2013)
- Prasanna Jaysinghe (2017)
- Susil Shantha Udukumburage (2021)

== See also ==
- Sri Lanka national under-19 basketball team
- Sri Lanka national 3x3 team
- Sri Lanka women's national basketball team
