= Thyagaraj Sports Complex =

Sports venue in New Delhi, India

Coordinates: 28°34′37″N 77°13′0″E

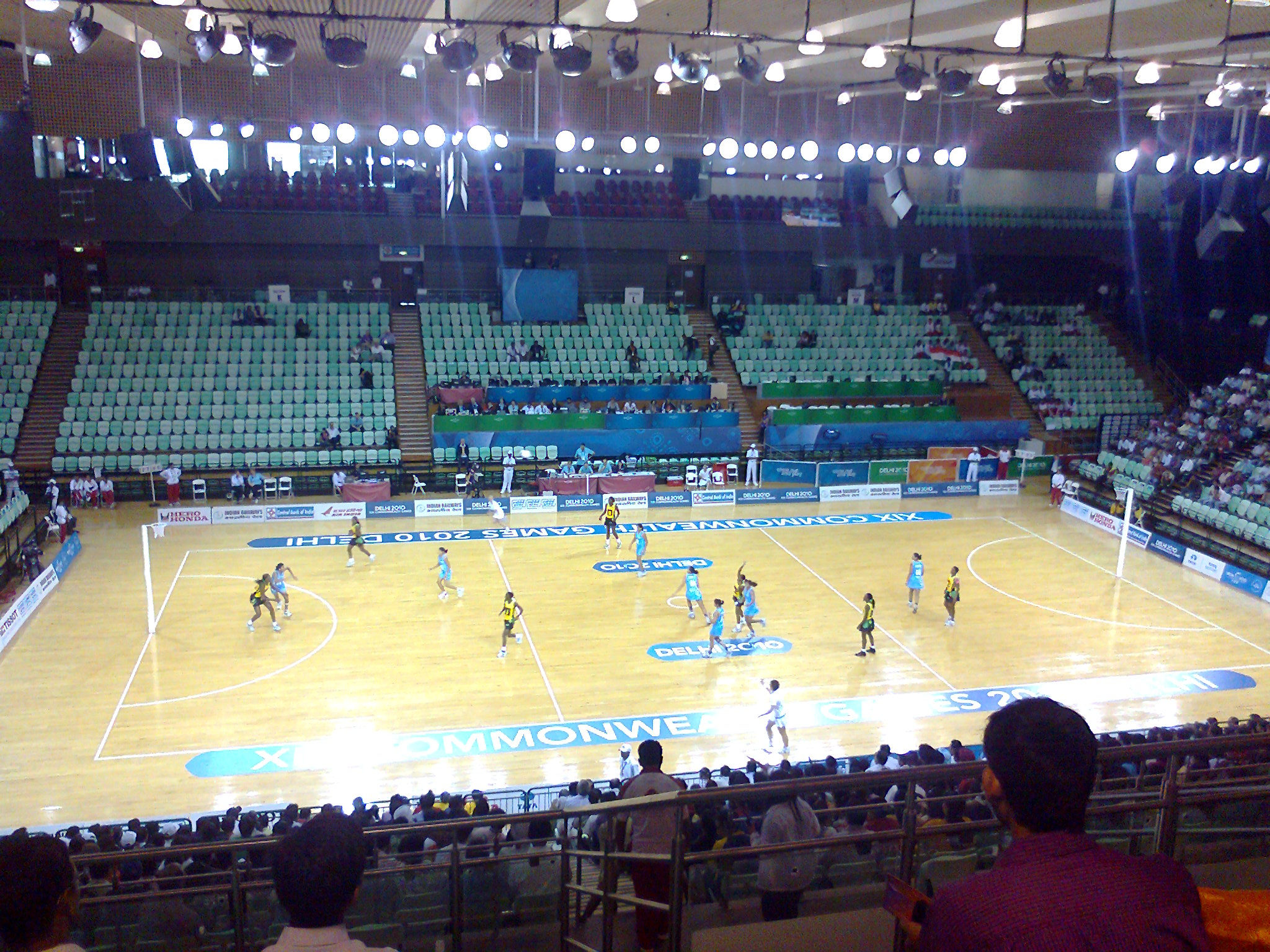
- Netball court
- Interactive map of Thyagaraj Sports Complex
- Location: New Delhi
- Capacity: 4,494+1200(open)

Construction
- Opened: 2 April 2010; 16 years ago
- Cost: ₹300 crore (US$31 million)

The Thyagaraj Sport Complex is a sports stadium in New Delhi, India. It is owned by the Government of the National Capital Territory of Delhi and was built at the cost of ₹300 crore (US$31 million). It was designed by leading architects PTM of Australia and Kapoor & Associates of Delhi. The venue was built for the 2010 Commonwealth Games, and was named after the 18th century Telugu composer Thyagaraja.

== History ==
Tyagaraj Sports Complex is built especially for Delhi 2010's Netball competition. Inaugurated on 2 April 2010 by Mrs. Sheila Dikshit, Chief Minister of Delhi, the stadium is named after the 18th century south Indian poet-composer Thyagaraja (4 May 1767 – 6 January 1847).

== Construction ==
Constructed over an area of 16.5 acres (6.7 ha) with a seating capacity of 5,883 persons, the Thyagaraj Stadium was built with green technologies such as the use of fly ash bricks in construction. The stadium will feature water management systems such as rainwater harvesting, sewage treatment with a capacity of 200,000 litres (44,000 imp gal; 53,000 US gal) per day, dual flush systems, and sensor-based faucets. Landscaping is being done with an emphasis on native species and a reduction in soil toxicity.

== Features ==
It is India's first-ever model Green Venue built with the latest green building technologies. The stadium has an R.C.C. structure with steel roofing, and the flooring work has been done using granite, recycled PVC, carpets, epoxy, and Kota stone. The stadium has maple wood flooring in the central arena. The Thyagaraj Stadium will be setting a benchmark in terms of power efficiency. Lighting will be provided using solar energy. In addition, building-integrated photovoltaic cells will allow the stadium to feed electricity to the grid. The Complex is also equipped with 2.5 megawatt-hours (9.0 GJ) Dual Fuel Gas Turbine to feed emergency electricity at Stadium. This Sport Complex is awarded Gold rating by Indian Green Building Council for its Green Features

== Events ==
The Thyagaraj Stadium was a venue for netball during the 2010 Commonwealth Games, which was contested from 4–14 October 2010. Now, the stadium houses the education department of the Government of Delhi. The 4th annual comic-con India took place here between 7–9 February 2014. The stadium is the home ground of Dabang Delhi in the Pro Kabaddi League. It has also hosted the India Open table tennis tournament in 2017.

== See also ==
- Jawaharlal Nehru Stadium, Delhi
