= 1989 ABC Championship =

1989 FIBA Asia Cup
15th Asian Basketball Championship

Tournament details
- Host country: China
- Dates: September 15–24
- Teams: 15
- Venue(s): 2 (in 1 host city)

Final positions
- Champions: China (7th title)

The 1989 Men's Asian Basketball Confederation Championship was held in Beijing, PR China.

== Draw ==
Group A	Group B	Group C	Group D
China; Thailand; Singapore; ~~Kuwait~~ * Saudi Arabia	South Korea; Malaysia; Indonesia * Iran; Pakistan	Japan; India; ~~Bahrain~~ * ~~Syria~~ *	Philippines; Chinese Taipei; Hong Kong; Bangladesh

* Kuwait, Bahrain and Syria withdrew from the tournament, following this Indonesia moved to Group C to balance the number of teams in each group.

== Preliminary round ==
=== Group A ===
Team	Pld	W	L	PF	PA	PD	Pts
China	3	3	0	296	171	+125	6
Saudi Arabia	3	2	1	249	241	+8	5
Singapore	3	1	2	169	240	−71	4
Thailand	3	0	3	178	240	−62	3

September 15
20:15

China	102–72	Saudi Arabia
Scoring by half: 57–37, 45–35

Capital Gymnasium, Beijing

September 16

Saudi Arabia	91–63	Singapore
Scoring by half: 44–37, 47–26

Capital Gymnasium, Beijing

September 16

China	96–51	Thailand
Scoring by half: 51–27, 45–24

Capital Gymnasium, Beijing

September 17

Thailand	51–58	Singapore
Scoring by half: 29–30, 22–28

Capital Gymnasium, Beijing

September 18

Singapore	48–98	China
Scoring by half: 22–52, 26–46

Capital Gymnasium, Beijing

September 19

Thailand	76–86	Saudi Arabia
Scoring by half: 40–45, 36–41

Capital Gymnasium, Beijing

=== Group B ===
Team	Pld	W	L	PF	PA	PD	Pts
South Korea	3	3	0	341	262	+79	6
Iran	3	2	1	294	261	+33	5
Malaysia	3	1	2	253	283	−30	4
Pakistan	3	0	3	259	341	−82	3

September 15
14:00

South Korea	120–96	Iran
Scoring by half: 54–46, 66–50

University Gymnasium, Beijing

September 16

South Korea	95–72	Malaysia
Scoring by half: 39–46, 56–26

Capital Gymnasium, Beijing

September 17

Pakistan	94–126	South Korea
Scoring by half: 51–62, 43–64

Capital Gymnasium, Beijing

September 17

Iran	90–74	Malaysia
Scoring by half: 43–41, 47–33

Capital Gymnasium, Beijing

September 18

Iran	108–67	Pakistan
Scoring by half: 55–39, 53–28

Capital Gymnasium, Beijing

September 19

Malaysia	107–98	Pakistan
Scoring by half: 57–52, 50–46

Capital Gymnasium, Beijing

=== Group C ===
Team	Pld	W	L	PF	PA	PD	Pts
Japan	2	2	0	161	104	+57	4
India	2	1	1	160	149	+11	3
Indonesia	2	0	2	106	174	−68	2

September 16

Japan	81–37	Indonesia
Scoring by half: 36–20, 45–17

Capital Gymnasium, Beijing

September 17

Indonesia	69–93	India
Scoring by half: 33–48, 36–45

Capital Gymnasium, Beijing

September 18

Japan	80–67	India
Scoring by half: 47–31, 33–36

Capital Gymnasium, Beijing

=== Group D ===
Team	Pld	W	L	PF	PA	PD	Pts
Chinese Taipei	3	3	0	345	205	+140	6
Philippines	3	2	1	339	232	+107	5
Hong Kong	3	1	2	266	273	−7	4
Bangladesh	3	0	3	158	398	−240	3

September 16
19:00

Philippines	150–52	Bangladesh
Scoring by half: 80–24, 70–28

University Gymnasium, Beijing

September 16

Chinese Taipei	113–70	Hong Kong
Scoring by half: 56–30, 57–40

University Gymnasium, Beijing

September 17

Bangladesh	61–135	Chinese Taipei
Scoring by half: 32–68, 29–67

University Gymnasium, Beijing

September 17
15:45

Philippines	115–83	Hong Kong
Scoring by half: 68–44, 47–39

University Gymnasium, Beijing

September 19

Hong Kong	113–45	Bangladesh
Scoring by half: 59–26, 54–19

Capital Gymnasium, Beijing

September 19
20:45

Philippines	74–97	Chinese Taipei
Scoring by half: 42–57, 32–40

Capital Gymnasium, Beijing

== Quarterfinal round ==
=== Group I ===
Team	Pld	W	L	PF	PA	PD	Pts
China	3	3	0	327	215	+112	6
Japan	3	2	1	229	214	+15	5
Iran	3	1	2	218	274	−56	4
Philippines	3	0	3	226	297	−71	3

September 20

Iran	53–73	Japan
Scoring by half: 24–42, 29–31

Capital Gymnasium, Beijing

September 20

China	118–73	Philippines
Scoring by half: 63–36, 55–37

Capital Gymnasium, Beijing

September 21

China	115–72	Iran
Scoring by half: 60–35, 55–37

Capital Gymnasium, Beijing

September 21
20:00

Japan	86–67	Philippines
Scoring by half: 48–35, 38–32

Capital Gymnasium, Beijing

September 22

Philippines	86–93	Iran
Scoring by half: 46–47, 40–46

Capital Gymnasium, Beijing

September 22

China	94–70	Japan
Scoring by half: 46–37, 48–33

Capital Gymnasium, Beijing

=== Group II ===
Team	Pld	W	L	PF	PA	PD	Pts
South Korea	3	3	0	300	260	+40	6
Chinese Taipei	3	2	1	278	273	+5	5
India	3	1	2	233	270	−37	4
Saudi Arabia	3	0	3	243	251	−8	3

September 20

Saudi Arabia	88–92	Chinese Taipei
Scoring by half: 55–51, 33–41

Capital Gymnasium, Beijing

September 20

South Korea	103–86	India
Scoring by half: 56–41, 47–45

Capital Gymnasium, Beijing

September 21

Saudi Arabia	83–85	South Korea
Scoring by half: 43–42, 40–43

Capital Gymnasium, Beijing

September 21

India	73–95	Chinese Taipei
Scoring by half: 35–50, 38–45

Capital Gymnasium, Beijing

September 22

Saudi Arabia	72–74	India
Scoring by half: 32–33, 40–41

Capital Gymnasium, Beijing

September 22

Chinese Taipei	91–112	South Korea
Scoring by half: 41–58, 50–54

Capital Gymnasium, Beijing

=== Group III ===
Team	Pld	W	L	PF	PA	PD	Pts
Pakistan	3	3	0	267	182	+85	6
Singapore	3	2	1	222	210	+12	5
Indonesia	3	1	2	216	204	+12	4
Bangladesh	3	0	3	159	268	−109	3

September 20

Singapore	80–66	Bangladesh
Scoring by half: 44–31, 36–35

University Gymnasium, Beijing

September 20

Pakistan	89–62	Indonesia
Scoring by half: 52–31, 37–31

University Gymnasium, Beijing

September 21

Bangladesh	52–104	Pakistan
Scoring by half: 16–54, 36–50

University Gymnasium, Beijing

September 21

Singapore	74–70	Indonesia
Scoring by half: 47–42, 27–28

University Gymnasium, Beijing

September 22

Singapore	68–74	Pakistan
Scoring by half: 39–32, 29–42

University Gymnasium, Beijing

September 22

Indonesia	84–41	Bangladesh
Scoring by half: 32–21, 52–20

University Gymnasium, Beijing

=== Group IV ===
Team	Pld	W	L	PF	PA	PD	Pts
Malaysia	2	2	0	214	157	+57	4
Thailand	2	1	1	166	184	−18	3
Hong Kong	2	0	2	171	210	−39	2

September 20

Thailand	95–85	Hong Kong
Scoring by half: 54–45, 41–40

University Gymnasium, Beijing

September 21

Hong Kong	86–115	Malaysia
Scoring by half: 41–56, 45–59

University Gymnasium, Beijing

September 22

Thailand	71–99	Malaysia
Scoring by half: 33–59, 38–40

University Gymnasium, Beijing

== Classification 5th–14th ==
=== 13th place ===
September 23

Indonesia	75–104	Hong Kong
Scoring by half: 33–59, 42–45

Capital Gymnasium, Beijing

=== 11th place ===
September 23

Singapore	85–73	Thailand
Scoring by half: 39–32, 46–41

Capital Gymnasium, Beijing

=== 9th place ===
September 23

Pakistan	77–110	Malaysia
Scoring by half: 35–50, 42–60

Capital Gymnasium, Beijing

=== 7th place ===
September 24
13:00

Philippines	89–91 (OT)	Saudi Arabia
Scoring by half: 45–40, 35–40 Overtime: 9–11

Capital Gymnasium, Beijing

=== 5th place ===
September 24

Iran	101–79	India
Scoring by half: 38–42, 63–37

Capital Gymnasium, Beijing

== Final round ==
Semifinals
September 23
China	92
Chinese Taipei	67
September 23
South Korea	110
Japan	86

Final
September 24
China	102
South Korea	72
3rd place
September 24
Chinese Taipei	69
Japan	58

=== Semifinals ===
September 23

China	92–67	Chinese Taipei
Scoring by half: 55–33, 37–34

Capital Gymnasium, Beijing

September 23

South Korea	110–86	Japan
Scoring by half: 53–39, 47–47

Capital Gymnasium, Beijing

=== 3rd place ===
September 24

Chinese Taipei	69–58	Japan
Scoring by half: 33–31, 36–27

Capital Gymnasium, Beijing

=== Final ===
September 24

China	102–72	South Korea
Scoring by half: 42–37, 60–35

Capital Gymnasium, Beijing

== Final standings ==
Qualified for the 1990 FIBA World Championship

Rank	Team	Record
1st place, gold medalist(s)	China	8–0
2nd place, silver medalist(s)	South Korea	7–1
3rd place, bronze medalist(s)	Chinese Taipei	6–2
4	Japan	4–3
5	Iran	4–3
6	India	2–4
7	Saudi Arabia	3–4
8	Philippines	2–5
9	Malaysia	4–2
10	Pakistan	3–4
11	Singapore	4–3
12	Thailand	1–5
13	Hong Kong	2–4
14	Indonesia	1–5
15	Bangladesh	0–6

== Awards ==
1989 Asian champions

China
Seventh title
