= 1991 ABC Championship =

16th Asian Basketball Championship

Tournament details
- Host country: Japan
- Dates: August 22 – September 1
- Teams: 18
- Venue(s): 2 (in 1 host city)

Final positions
- Champions: China (8th title)
- Runners-up: Japan
- Third place: South Korea
- Fourth place: Chinese Taipei

The 1991 Men's Asian Basketball Confederation Championship was held in Kobe, Japan.

== Preliminary round ==
=== Group A ===
Team	Pld	W	L	PF	PA	PD	Pts
China	4	4	0	464	274	+190	8
Philippines	4	3	1	389	326	+63	7
Bahrain	4	2	2	302	340	−38	6
Kuwait	4	1	3	262	336	−74	5
Malaysia	4	0	4	340	481	−141	4

August 22

Kuwait	59–77	Philippines
Scoring by half: 29–38, 30–39

Kobe

August 22

Bahrain	49–80	China
Scoring by half: 19–33, 30–47

Kobe

August 23

Kuwait	59–62	Bahrain
Scoring by half: 37–28, 22–34

Kobe

August 23

China	154–95	Malaysia
Scoring by half: 75–47, 79–48

Kobe

August 24

Philippines	126–77	Malaysia
Scoring by half: 58–41, 68–36

Kobe

August 24

China	123–51	Kuwait
Scoring by half: 72–24, 51–27

Kobe

August 25

Philippines	79–107	China
Scoring by half: 40–47, 39–60

Kobe

August 25

Malaysia	94–108	Bahrain
Scoring by half: 45–58, 49–50

Kobe

August 26

Bahrain	83–107	Philippines
Scoring by half: 49–46, 34–61

Kobe

August 26

Malaysia	74–93	Kuwait
Scoring by half: 43–48, 31–45

Kobe

=== Group B ===
Team	Pld	W	L	PF	PA	PD	Pts	Tiebreaker
South Korea	4	4	0	292	174	+118	8	
Jordan	4	2	2	346	296	+50	6	1–1 / 1.195
Saudi Arabia	4	2	2	351	284	+67	6	1–1 / 1.124
Singapore	4	2	2	301	412	−111	6	1–1 / 0.749
Sri Lanka	4	0	4	170	294	−124	3	

August 22

Jordan	73–97	Saudi Arabia
Scoring by half: 45–45, 28–52

Kobe

August 22

Sri Lanka	0–2	South Korea
Forfeit

Kobe

August 23

Jordan	82–33	Sri Lanka
Scoring by half: 37–12, 45–21

Kobe

August 23

Singapore	54–123	South Korea
Scoring by half: 20–69, 34–54

Kobe

August 24

Saudi Arabia	84–88	Singapore
Scoring by half: 36–51, 52–33

Kobe

August 24

South Korea	99–68	Jordan
Scoring by half: 53–32, 46–36

Kobe

August 25

Sri Lanka	82–92	Singapore
Scoring by half: 37–52, 45–40

Kobe

August 25

South Korea	68–52	Saudi Arabia
Scoring by half: 32–33, 36–19

Kobe

August 26

Saudi Arabia	118–55	Sri Lanka
Scoring by half: 55–33, 63–22

Kobe

August 26

Singapore	67–123	Jordan
Scoring by half: 38–65, 29–58

Kobe

=== Group C ===
Team	Pld	W	L	PF	PA	PD	Pts
Chinese Taipei	3	3	0	304	229	+75	6
North Korea	3	2	1	254	249	+5	5
Hong Kong	3	1	2	221	251	−30	4
India	3	0	3	258	308	−50	3

August 24

Hong Kong	88–71	India
Scoring by half: 47–44, 41–27

Kobe

August 24

Chinese Taipei	90–68	North Korea
Scoring by half: 45–34, 45–34

Kobe

August 25

India	88–105	North Korea
Scoring by half: 47–58, 41–47

Kobe

August 25

Chinese Taipei	99–62	Hong Kong
Scoring by half: 44–29, 55–33

Kobe

August 26

North Korea	81–71	Hong Kong
Scoring by half: 45–34, 36–37

Kobe

August 26

India	99–115	Chinese Taipei
Scoring by half: 43–64, 56–51

Kobe

=== Group D ===
Team	Pld	W	L	PF	PA	PD	Pts
Japan	3	3	0	271	169	+102	6
Iran	3	2	1	291	208	+83	5
Qatar	3	1	2	145	260	−115	4
Indonesia	3	0	3	193	263	−70	3

August 22

Indonesia	80–110	Iran
Scoring by half: 50–30, 60–50

Kobe

August 22

Japan	95–40	Qatar
Scoring by half: 55–23, 40–17

Kobe

August 24

Qatar	45–107	Iran
Scoring by half: 29–54, 16–53

Kobe

August 24

Japan	93–55	Indonesia
Scoring by half: 44–24, 49–31

Kobe

August 25

Qatar	60–58	Indonesia
Scoring by half: 32–34, 28–24

Kobe

August 25

Iran	74–83	Japan
Scoring by half: 38–46, 36–37

Kobe

== Quarterfinal round ==
=== Group I ===
Team	Pld	W	L	PF	PA	PD	Pts	Tiebreaker
China	3	3	0	292	174	+118	6	
Chinese Taipei	3	1	2	225	234	−9	4	1–1 / 1.076
Iran	3	1	2	214	264	−50	4	1–1 / 1.037
Jordan	3	1	2	212	271	−59	4	1–1 / 0.901

August 27

Iran	68–82	Chinese Taipei
Scoring by half: 37–41, 31–41

Port Island Hall, Kobe

China	99–57	Jordan
Scoring by half: 51–27, 48–30

Port Island Hall, Kobe

Iran	47–103	China
Scoring by half: 21–48, 26–55

Port Island Hall, Kobe

August 28

Jordan	76–73	Chinese Taipei
Scoring by half: 35–37, 41–36

Port Island Hall, Kobe

Jordan	79–99	Iran
Scoring by half: 37–54, 42–45

Port Island Hall, Kobe

August 30

Chinese Taipei	70–90	China
Scoring by half: 26–47, 44–43

Port Island Hall, Kobe

=== Group II ===
Team	Pld	W	L	PF	PA	PD	Pts	Tiebreaker
South Korea	3	3	0	302	244	+58	6	
Japan	3	1	2	270	257	+13	4	1–1 / 1.158
North Korea	3	1	2	250	282	−32	4	1–1 / 1.000
Philippines	3	1	2	253	292	−39	4	1–1 / 0.867

August 27

South Korea	114–82	North Korea
Scoring by half: 57–39, 57–43

Port Island Hall, Kobe

August 27

Japan	110–83	Philippines
Scoring by half: 54–41, 56–42

Port Island Hall, Kobe

North Korea	82–81	Japan
Scoring by half: 38–40, 44–41

Port Island Hall, Kobe

Philippines	83–96	South Korea
Scoring by half: 43–55, 40–41

Port Island Hall, Kobe

Philippines	87–86	North Korea
Scoring by half: 49–42, 38–44

Port Island Hall, Kobe

Japan	79–92	South Korea
Scoring by half: 39–47, 40–45

Port Island Hall, Kobe

=== Group III ===
Team	Pld	W	L	PF	PA	PD	Pts	Tiebreaker
Singapore	3	2	1	245	242	+3	5	1–0
Hong Kong	3	2	1	258	244	+14	5	0–1
Indonesia	3	1	2	225	249	−24	4	1–0
Bahrain	3	1	2	246	239	+7	4	0–1

August 27

Indonesia	70–81	Hong Kong
Scoring by half: 43–52, 27–29

Kobe

Bahrain	81–68	Singapore
Scoring by half: 42–39, 39–29

Kobe

Hong Kong	90–91	Singapore
Scoring by half: 51–39, 39–52

Kobe

Indonesia	84–82	Bahrain
Scoring by half: 39–37, 45–45

Kobe

Singapore	86–71	Indonesia
Scoring by half: 45–36, 41–35

Kobe

Bahrain	83–87	Hong Kong
Scoring by half: 47–50, 36–37

Kobe

=== Group IV ===
Team	Pld	W	L	PF	PA	PD	Pts
Saudi Arabia	3	3	0	251	172	+79	6
Kuwait	3	2	1	213	204	+9	5
India	3	1	2	218	219	−1	4
Qatar	3	0	3	163	250	−87	3

August 27

Qatar	65–75	Kuwait
Scoring by half: 25–30, 40–45

Kobe

August 27

India	67–88	Saudi Arabia
Scoring by half: 39–44, 28–44

Kobe

India	93–54	Qatar
Scoring by half: 54–26, 39–28

Kobe

Kuwait	61–81	Saudi Arabia
Scoring by half: 29–43, 32–38

Kobe

Saudi Arabia	82–44	Qatar
Scoring by half: 46–21, 36–23

Kobe

August 30

Kuwait	77–58	India
Scoring by half: 30–24, 47–34

Kobe

== Classification 9th–18th ==
=== 17th place ===
Malaysia	85–54	Sri Lanka
Scoring by half: 43–30, 42–24

Kobe

=== 15th place ===
Bahrain	76–63	Qatar
Scoring by half: 37–30, 39–33

Kobe

=== 13th place ===
Indonesia	69–99	India
Scoring by half: 28–45, 41–54

Kobe

=== 11th place ===
Hong Kong	2–0	Kuwait
Forfeit

Kobe

=== 9th place ===
Singapore	80–114	Saudi Arabia
Scoring by half: 35–61, 45–53

Kobe

== Classification 5th–8th ==
Semifinals
August 31
Iran	91
Philippines	81
August 31
North Korea	93
Jordan	69

5th place
September 1
Iran	84
North Korea	97
7th place
September 1
Philippines	2
Jordan	0

=== Semifinals ===
August 31

Iran	91–81	Philippines
Scoring by half: 48–38, 43–43

Port Island Hall, Kobe

August 31

North Korea	93–69	Jordan
Scoring by half: 46–28, 47–41

Port Island Hall, Kobe

=== 7th place ===
September 1

Philippines	2–0	Jordan
Forfeit

Port Island Hall, Kobe

=== 5th place ===
September 1

Iran	84–97	North Korea
Scoring by half: 39–45, 45–52

Port Island Hall, Kobe

== Final round ==
Semifinals
August 31
China	105
Japan	62
August 31
South Korea	93
Chinese Taipei	92

Final
September 1
China	104
South Korea	88
3rd place
September 1
Japan	63
Chinese Taipei	60

=== Semifinals ===
August 31

China	105–62	Japan
Scoring by half: 45–35, 60–27

Port Island Hall, Kobe

August 31

South Korea	93–92	Chinese Taipei
Scoring by half: 40–49, 53–43

Port Island Hall, Kobe

=== 3rd place ===
September 1

Japan	63–60	Chinese Taipei
Scoring by half: 26–28, 37–32

Port Island Hall, Kobe

=== Final ===
September 1

China	104–88	South Korea
Scoring by half: 57–39, 47–49

Port Island Hall, Kobe

== Final standings ==
Qualified for the 1992 Summer Olympics

Rank	Team	Record
1st place, gold medalist(s)	China	9–0
2nd place, silver medalist(s)	South Korea	8–1
3rd place, bronze medalist(s)	Japan	5–3
4	Chinese Taipei	4–4
5	North Korea	5–3
6	Iran	4–4
7	Philippines	5–4
8	Jordan	3–6
9	Saudi Arabia	6–2
10	Singapore	4–4
11	Hong Kong	4–3
12	Kuwait	3–5
13	India	2–5
14	Indonesia	1–6
15	Bahrain	4–4
16	Qatar	1–6
17	Malaysia	1–4
18	Sri Lanka	0–5

== Awards ==
1991 Asian champions

China
Eighth title
