= 1993 ABC Championship =

17th Asian Basketball Championship

Tournament details
- Host country: Indonesia
- Dates: November 12–21
- Teams: 18
- Venue: 1 (in 1 host city)

Final positions
- Champions: China (9th title)
- Runners-up: North Korea
- Third place: South Korea
- Fourth place: Iran

The 1993 Asian Basketball Confederation Championship for Men were held in Jakarta, Indonesia.

== Preliminary round ==
=== Group A ===
Team	Pld	W	L	PF	PA	PD	Pts	Tiebreaker
Saudi Arabia	4	3	1	322	261	+61	7	1–0
China	4	3	1	390	222	+168	7	0–1
Jordan	4	2	2	240	273	−33	6	1–0
Thailand	4	2	2	300	345	−45	6	0–1
Pakistan	4	0	4	222	373	−151	4	

November 12

Pakistan	70–91	Thailand
Scoring by half: 33–45, 37–46

Jakarta

November 12

Saudi Arabia	69–53	Jordan
Scoring by half: 36–25, 33–28

Jakarta

November 13

Pakistan	55–101	Saudi Arabia
Scoring by half: 20–51, 35–50

Jakarta

November 13

Thailand	62–125	China
Scoring by half: 25–69, 37–56

Jakarta

November 14

Jordan	69–57	Pakistan
Scoring by half: 38–26, 31–31

Jakarta

November 14

Saudi Arabia	74–69 (OT)	China
Scoring by half: 24–20, 35–39 Overtime: 15–10

Jakarta

November 15

Thailand	84–78	Saudi Arabia
Scoring by half: 44–35, 40–43

Jakarta

November 15

China	84–46	Jordan
Scoring by half: 41–17, 43–29

Jakarta

November 16

Jordan	72–63	Thailand
Scoring by half: 38–35, 34–28

Jakarta

November 16

Pakistan	40–112	China
Scoring by half: 23–63, 17–49

Jakarta

=== Group B ===
Team	Pld	W	L	PF	PA	PD	Pts
South Korea	3	3	0	269	171	+98	6
United Arab Emirates	3	2	1	214	201	+13	5
Philippines	3	1	2	234	216	+18	4
Singapore	3	0	3	144	273	−129	3

November 12

Philippines	70–74	United Arab Emirates
Scoring by half: 41–41, 29–33

Jakarta

November 12

South Korea	107–33	Singapore
Scoring by half: 50–11, 57–22

Jakarta

November 14

United Arab Emirates	77–49	Singapore
Scoring by half: 42–22, 35–27

Jakarta

November 14

South Korea	80–75	Philippines
Scoring by half: 38–31, 42–44

Jakarta

November 15

United Arab Emirates	63–82	South Korea
Scoring by half: 31–36, 32–46

Jakarta

November 16

Singapore	62–89	Philippines
Scoring by half: 28–44, 34–45

Jakarta

=== Group C ===
Team	Pld	W	L	PF	PA	PD	Pts
Iran	3	3	0	273	120	+53	6
Japan	3	2	1	288	211	+77	5
Indonesia	3	1	2	195	237	−42	4
Hong Kong	3	0	3	183	271	−88	3

November 12

Iran	94–61	Hong Kong
Scoring by half: 40–31, 54–30

Jakarta

November 13

Hong Kong	62–71	Indonesia
Scoring by half: 32–23, 30–48

Jakarta

November 14

Japan	88–98	Iran
Scoring by half: 44–53, 44–45

Jakarta

November 15

Hong Kong	60–106	Japan
Scoring by half: 26–56, 34–50

Jakarta

November 15

Indonesia	71–81	Iran
Scoring by half: 25–39, 46–42

Jakarta

November 16

Japan	94–53	Indonesia
Scoring by half: 41–23, 53–30

Jakarta

=== Group D ===
Team	Pld	W	L	PF	PA	PD	Pts	Tiebreaker
Chinese Taipei	3	3	0	290	179	+111	6	1–0
North Korea	3	3	0	282	205	+77	6	1–0
Kuwait	4	2	2	344	266	+78	6	0–2
Malaysia	4	1	3	356	323	+33	5	
Bangladesh	4	0	4	209	508	−299	4	

November 12

North Korea	75–70	Malaysia
Scoring by half: 41–31, 34–39

Jakarta

November 12

Chinese Taipei	76–65	Kuwait
Scoring by half: 43–40, 33–25

Jakarta

November 13

Kuwait	124–36	Bangladesh
Scoring by half: 56–20, 68–16

Jakarta

November 13

Malaysia	72–97	Chinese Taipei
Scoring by half: 44–51, 28–46

Jakarta

November 14

North Korea	84–77	Kuwait
Scoring by half: 64–39, 20–38

Jakarta

November 14

Chinese Taipei	117–42	Bangladesh
Scoring by half: 62–12, 55–30

Jakarta

November 15

Bangladesh	58–123	North Korea
Scoring by half: 24–62, 34–61

Jakarta

November 15

Kuwait	78–70	Malaysia
Scoring by half: 37–42, 41–28

Jakarta

November 16

Malaysia	144–73	Bangladesh
Scoring by half: 69–37, 75–36

Jakarta

November 16

North Korea	vs.	Chinese Taipei
Scoring by half: 7–14

Jakarta

- The game between North Korea and Chinese Taipei was called with Chinese Taipei leading 14–7 after 11 minutes.

== Classification 17th–18th ==
November 17

Pakistan	106–50	Bangladesh

Jakarta

== Classification 9th–16th ==
Quarterfinals
November 17
Jordan	90
Malaysia	79
November 17
Singapore	60
Indonesia	71
November 17
Philippines	96
Hong Kong	75
November 17
Thailand	53
Kuwait	88

Semifinals
November 18
Jordan	65
Indonesia	42
November 18
Philippines	82
Kuwait	84

9th place
November 20
Jordan	65
Kuwait	62
11th place
November 20
Indonesia	76
Philippines	89

Semifinals
November 19
Malaysia	86
Singapore	81
November 19
Hong Kong	77
Thailand	65

13th place
November 20
Malaysia	67
Hong Kong	77
15th place
November 20
Singapore	70
Thailand	103

=== Quarterfinals ===
November 17

Jordan	90–79	Malaysia
Scoring by half: 52–48, 38–31

Jakarta

November 17

Singapore	60–71	Indonesia
Scoring by half: 27–34, 33–37

Jakarta

November 17

Philippines	96–75	Hong Kong
Scoring by half: 45–32, 51–43

Jakarta

November 17

Thailand	53–88	Kuwait
Scoring by half: 24–41, 29–47

Jakarta

=== Semifinals 13th–16th ===
November 19

Malaysia	86–81	Singapore
Scoring by half: 46–42, 40–39

Jakarta

November 19

Hong Kong	77–65	Thailand
Scoring by half: 33–34, 44–31

Jakarta

=== Semifinals 9th–12th ===
November 18

Jordan	65–42	Indonesia
Scoring by half: 31–30, 34–12

Jakarta

November 18

Philippines	82–84	Kuwait
Scoring by half: 43–42, 39–42

Jakarta

=== 15th place ===
November 20

Singapore	70–103	Thailand
Scoring by half: 35–49, 35–54

Jakarta

=== 13th place ===
November 20

Malaysia	67–77	Hong Kong
Scoring by half: 30–40, 37–37

Jakarta

=== 11th place ===
November 20

Indonesia	76–89	Philippines
Scoring by half: 36–46, 40–43

Jakarta

=== 9th place ===
November 20

Kuwait	62–65	Jordan
Scoring by half: 24–39, 38–26

Jakarta

== Final round ==
Quarterfinals
November 18
Saudi Arabia	61
North Korea	80
November 18
United Arab Emirates	73
Iran	77
November 18
South Korea	89
Japan	66
November 18
China	87
Chinese Taipei	67

Semifinals
November 20
North Korea	86
Iran	69
November 20
South Korea	62
China	81

Final
November 21
North Korea	72
China	93
3rd place
November 21
Iran	70
South Korea	86

Semifinals
November 19
Saudi Arabia	62
United Arab Emirates	53
November 19
Japan	66
Chinese Taipei	72

5th place
November 21
Saudi Arabia	74
Chinese Taipei	75
7th place
November 21
United Arab Emirates	76
Japan	83

=== Quarterfinals ===
November 18

Saudi Arabia	61–80	North Korea
Scoring by half: 23–37, 38–43

Jakarta

November 18

United Arab Emirates	73–77	Iran
Scoring by half: 46–36, 27–41

Jakarta

November 18

South Korea	89–66	Japan
Scoring by half: 38–39, 51–27

Jakarta

November 18

China	87–67	Chinese Taipei
Scoring by half: 47–35, 40–32

Jakarta

=== Semifinals 5th–8th ===
November 19

Saudi Arabia	62–53	United Arab Emirates
Scoring by half: 39–29, 23–24

Jakarta

November 19

Japan	66–72	Chinese Taipei
Scoring by half: 34–50, 32–22

Jakarta

=== Semifinals ===
November 20

North Korea	86–69	Iran
Scoring by half: 45–41, 41–28

Jakarta

November 20

South Korea	62–81	China
Scoring by half: 30–33, 32–48

Jakarta

=== 7th place ===
November 21

United Arab Emirates	76–83	Japan
Scoring by half: 36–36, 40–47

Jakarta

=== 5th place ===
November 21

Saudi Arabia	74–75	Chinese Taipei
Scoring by half: 37–43, 37–32

Jakarta

=== 3rd place ===
November 21

Iran	70–86	South Korea
Scoring by half: 30–31, 40–55

Jakarta

=== Final ===
November 21

North Korea	72–93	China
Scoring by half: 39–47, 33–46

Jakarta

== Final standings ==
Qualified for the 1994 FIBA World Championship

Rank	Team	Record
1st place, gold medalist(s)	China	6–1
2nd place, silver medalist(s)	North Korea	5–1
3rd place, bronze medalist(s)	South Korea	5–1
4	Iran	4–2
5	Chinese Taipei	5–1
6	Saudi Arabia	4–3
7	Japan	3–3
8	United Arab Emirates	2–4
9	Jordan	5–2
10	Kuwait	4–3
11	Philippines	3–3
12	Indonesia	2–4
13	Hong Kong	2–4
14	Malaysia	2–5
15	Thailand	3–4
16	Singapore	0–6
17	Pakistan	1–4
18	Bangladesh	0–5

== Awards ==
1993 Asian champions

China
Ninth title
