= 1981 ABC Championship =

1981 FIBA Asia Cup
11th Asian Basketball Championship

Tournament details
- Host country: India
- Dates: 12–20 November
- Teams: 12
- Venue(s): 1 (in 1 host city)

Final positions
- Champions: China (4th title)

The 1981 Asian Basketball Confederation Championship for Men were held in Kolkata, India.

== Preliminary round ==
=== Group A ===
Team	Pld	W	L	PF	PA	PD	Pts
China	3	3	0	370	191	+179	6
Malaysia	3	2	1	229	245	−16	5
Iran	3	1	2	212	268	−56	4
Pakistan	3	0	3	202	309	−107	3

12 November

China	116–70	Iran
Scoring by half: 60–37, 56–33

Netaji Indoor Stadium, Kolkata

12 November

Pakistan	62–96	Malaysia
Scoring by half: 34–43, 28–53

Netaji Indoor Stadium, Kolkata

13 November

Iran	85–82	Pakistan
Scoring by half: 40–45, 45–37

Netaji Indoor Stadium, Kolkata

13 November

Malaysia	63–126	China
Scoring by half: 34–55, 29–71

Netaji Indoor Stadium, Kolkata

14 November

China	128–58	Pakistan
Scoring by half: 60–30, 68–28

Netaji Indoor Stadium, Kolkata

14 November

Iran	57–70	Malaysia
Scoring by half: 29–41, 28–29

Netaji Indoor Stadium, Kolkata

=== Group B ===
Team	Pld	W	L	PF	PA	PD	Pts
Japan	3	3	0	318	170	+148	6
India	3	2	1	252	176	+76	5
Hong Kong	3	1	2	196	243	−47	4
Sri Lanka	3	0	3	152	329	−177	3

12 November

India	102–37	Sri Lanka
Scoring by half: 59–16, 43–21

Netaji Indoor Stadium, Kolkata

12 November

Japan	104–44	Hong Kong
Scoring by half: 45–30, 59–14

Netaji Indoor Stadium, Kolkata

13 November

Sri Lanka	51–126	Japan
Scoring by half: 23–70, 28–56

Netaji Indoor Stadium, Kolkata

13 November

Hong Kong	51–75	India
Scoring by half: 20–39, 31–36

Netaji Indoor Stadium, Kolkata

14 November

India	75–88	Japan
Scoring by half: 42–45, 33–43

Netaji Indoor Stadium, Kolkata

14 November

Sri Lanka	64–101	Hong Kong
Scoring by half: 28–40, 36–61

Netaji Indoor Stadium, Kolkata

=== Group C ===
Team	Pld	W	L	PF	PA	PD	Pts
South Korea	3	3	0	326	209	+117	6
Philippines	3	2	1	235	201	+34	5
Thailand	3	1	2	214	261	−47	4
Singapore	3	0	3	162	266	−104	3

12 November

South Korea	109–62	Singapore
Scoring by half: 55–32, 54–30

Netaji Indoor Stadium, Kolkata

12 November

Philippines	81–64	Thailand
Scoring by half: 39–38, 42–26

Netaji Indoor Stadium, Kolkata

13 November

Thailand	85–127	South Korea
Scoring by half: 42–58, 43–69

Netaji Indoor Stadium, Kolkata

13 November

Singapore	47–92	Philippines
Scoring by half: 20–47, 27–45

Netaji Indoor Stadium, Kolkata

14 November

Thailand	65–53	Singapore
Scoring by half: 38–29, 27–24

Netaji Indoor Stadium, Kolkata

14 November

South Korea	90–62	Philippines
Scoring by half: 36–31, 54–31

Netaji Indoor Stadium, Kolkata

== Final round ==
- The results and the points of the matches between the same teams that were already played during the preliminary round shall be taken into account for the final round.

=== Classification 7th–12th ===
Team	Pld	W	L	PF	PA	PD	Pts	Tiebreaker
Thailand	5	5	0	418	346	+72	10	
Iran	5	3	2	441	380	+61	8	1–0
Pakistan	5	3	2	401	357	+44	8	0–1
Hong Kong	5	2	3	411	421	−10	7	1–0
Singapore	5	2	3	353	362	−9	7	0–1
Sri Lanka	5	0	5	316	474	−158	5	

16 November

Pakistan	91–53	Sri Lanka
Scoring by half: 51–20, 40–33

Netaji Indoor Stadium, Kolkata

16 November

Iran	84–87 (OT)	Thailand
Scoring by half: 38–37, 41–42 Overtime: 5–8

Netaji Indoor Stadium, Kolkata

16 November

Hong Kong	73–69	Singapore
Scoring by half: 36–40, 37–29

Netaji Indoor Stadium, Kolkata

17 November

Pakistan	59–66	Thailand
Scoring by half: 28–24, 31–42

Netaji Indoor Stadium, Kolkata

17 November

Sri Lanka	68–85	Singapore
Scoring by half: 29–38, 39–47

Netaji Indoor Stadium, Kolkata

17 November

Iran	114–101	Hong Kong
Scoring by half: 57–50, 57–51

Netaji Indoor Stadium, Kolkata

18 November

Thailand	102–89	Sri Lanka
Scoring by half: 55–43, 47–46

Netaji Indoor Stadium, Kolkata

18 November

Hong Kong	75–76	Pakistan
Scoring by half: 41–34, 34–42

Netaji Indoor Stadium, Kolkata

18 November

Singapore	68–63	Iran
Scoring by half: 32–30, 36–33

Netaji Indoor Stadium, Kolkata

19 November

Iran	95–42	Sri Lanka
Scoring by half: 46–19, 49–23

Netaji Indoor Stadium, Kolkata

19 November

Hong Kong	61–98	Thailand
Scoring by half: 31–54, 30–44

Netaji Indoor Stadium, Kolkata

19 November

Pakistan	93–78	Singapore
Scoring by half: 44–46, 49–32

Netaji Indoor Stadium, Kolkata

=== Championship ===
Team	Pld	W	L	PF	PA	PD	Pts
China	5	5	0	482	308	+174	10
South Korea	5	4	1	466	393	+73	9
Japan	5	3	2	405	375	+30	8
Philippines	5	2	3	370	421	−51	7
India	5	1	4	344	423	−79	6
Malaysia	5	0	5	328	475	−147	5

16 November

Malaysia	54–70	India
Scoring by half: 19–32, 35–38

Netaji Indoor Stadium, Kolkata

16 November

China	97–66	Philippines
Scoring by half: 52–46, 45–20

Netaji Indoor Stadium, Kolkata

16 November

Japan	71–91	South Korea
Scoring by half: 34–44, 37–47

Netaji Indoor Stadium, Kolkata

17 November

Philippines	82–70	Malaysia
Scoring by half: 47–40, 35–30

Netaji Indoor Stadium, Kolkata

17 November

South Korea	111–79	India
Scoring by half: 61–42, 50–37

Netaji Indoor Stadium, Kolkata

17 November

China	71–60	Japan
Scoring by half: 32–20, 39–40

Netaji Indoor Stadium, Kolkata

18 November

Malaysia	85–110	South Korea
Scoring by half: 37–72, 48–38

Netaji Indoor Stadium, Kolkata

18 November

Japan	99–82	Philippines
Scoring by half: 51–38, 48–44

Netaji Indoor Stadium, Kolkata

18 November

India	55–92	China
Scoring by half: 25–52, 30–40

Netaji Indoor Stadium, Kolkata

19 November

Malaysia	56–87	Japan
Scoring by half: 23–43, 33–44

Netaji Indoor Stadium, Kolkata

20 November

Philippines	78–65	India
Scoring by half: 40–34, 38–31

Netaji Indoor Stadium, Kolkata

20 November

China	96–64	South Korea
Scoring by half: 43–26, 53–38

Netaji Indoor Stadium, Kolkata

== Final standings ==
Qualified for the 1982 FIBA World Championship

Rank	Team	Record
1st place, gold medalist(s)	China	7–0
2nd place, silver medalist(s)	South Korea	6–1
3rd place, bronze medalist(s)	Japan	5–2
4	Philippines	4–3
5	India	3–4
6	Malaysia	2–5
7	Thailand	5–2
8	Iran	3–4
9	Pakistan	3–4
10	Hong Kong	2–5
11	Singapore	2–5
12	Sri Lanka	0–7

== Awards ==
1981 Asian champions

China
Fourth title
