= 1995 ABC Championship =

18th Asian Basketball Championship

Tournament details
- Host country: South Korea
- Dates: June 17–26
- Teams: 19
- Venue(s): 2 (in 1 host city)

Final positions
- Champions: China (10th title)
- Runners-up: South Korea
- Third place: Japan
- Fourth place: Chinese Taipei

Tournament statistics
- MVP: (South Korea) Hur Jae

The 1995 Asian Basketball Confederation Championship for Men were held in Seoul, South Korea.

== Preliminary round ==
=== Group A ===
Team	Pld	W	L	PF	PA	PD	Pts
China	4	4	0	360	189	+171	8
Kyrgyzstan	4	3	1	247	244	+3	7
India	4	2	2	227	242	−15	6
Kuwait	4	1	3	214	267	−53	5
Jordan	4	0	4	197	303	−106	4

June 17

China	97–47	Kyrgyzstan
Scoring by half: 41–22, 56–25

Seoul

June 17

Jordan	44–66	India
Scoring by half: 23–34, 21–32

Seoul

June 18

Kyrgyzstan	57–50	Kuwait
Scoring by half: 34–27, 23–23

Seoul

June 18

China	100–44	Jordan
Scoring by half: 53–22, 47–22

Seoul

June 19

Kuwait	42–68	India
Scoring by half: 26–30, 16–38

Seoul

June 19

Jordan	51–66	Kyrgyzstan
Scoring by half: 27–36, 24–30

Seoul

June 20

Kuwait	71–58	Jordan
Scoring by half: 34–31, 37–27

Seoul

June 20

India	47–79	China
Scoring by half: 25–43, 22–36

Seoul

June 21

China	84–51	Kuwait
Scoring by half: 42–21, 42–30

Seoul

June 21

Kyrgyzstan	77–46	India
Scoring by half: 39–25, 38–21

Seoul

=== Group B ===
Team	Pld	W	L	PF	PA	PD	Pts
South Korea	3	3	0	264	205	+59	6
Uzbekistan	3	2	1	225	190	+35	5
United Arab Emirates	3	1	2	173	209	−36	4
Philippines	3	0	3	192	250	−58	3

June 17

Uzbekistan	68–88	South Korea
Scoring by half: 36–38, 32–50

Seoul

June 18

South Korea	78–61	United Arab Emirates
Scoring by half: 45–31, 33–30

Seoul

June 18

Philippines	60–82	Uzbekistan
Scoring by half: 32–45, 28–37

Seoul

June 19

United Arab Emirates	70–56	Philippines
Scoring by half: 32–38, 38–18

Seoul

June 20

Uzbekistan	75–42	United Arab Emirates
Scoring by half: 31–24, 44–18

Seoul

June 20

Philippines	76–98	South Korea
Scoring by half: 38–46, 38–52

Seoul

=== Group C ===
Team	Pld	W	L	PF	PA	PD	Pts
Japan	4	4	0	379	247	+132	8
Kazakhstan	4	3	1	340	292	+48	7
Iran	4	2	2	350	317	+33	6
Thailand	4	1	3	242	343	−101	5
Indonesia	4	0	4	232	344	−112	4

June 17

Indonesia	66–71	Thailand
Scoring by half: 36–34, 30–37

Seoul

June 17

Iran	74–87	Kazakhstan
Scoring by half: 33–44, 41–43

Seoul

June 18

Kazakhstan	82–90	Japan
Scoring by half: 40–46, 42–44

Seoul

June 18

Iran	98–69	Indonesia
Scoring by half: 49–49, 49–20

Seoul

June 19

Japan	91–43	Thailand
Scoring by half: 50–17, 41–26

Seoul

June 19

Indonesia	58–80	Kazakhstan
Scoring by half: 40–47, 18–33

Seoul

June 20

Japan	95–39	Indonesia
Scoring by half: 54–16, 41–23

Seoul

June 20

Thailand	58–95	Iran
Scoring by half: 24–56, 34–39

Seoul

June 21

Iran	83–103	Japan
Scoring by half: 39–46, 44–57

Seoul

June 21

Kazakhstan	91–70	Thailand
Scoring by half: 53–37, 38–33

Seoul

=== Group D ===
Team	Pld	W	L	PF	PA	PD	Pts
Chinese Taipei	4	4	0	370	226	+144	8
Saudi Arabia	4	3	1	330	227	+103	7
Malaysia	4	2	2	280	334	−54	6
Hong Kong	4	1	3	250	282	−32	5
Sri Lanka	4	0	4	152	313	−161	4

June 17

Chinese Taipei	96–27	Sri Lanka
Scoring by half: 49–9, 47–18

Seoul

June 17

Hong Kong	72–73	Malaysia
Scoring by half: 44–31, 28–42

Seoul

June 18

Chinese Taipei	83–57	Hong Kong
Scoring by half: 37–21, 46–36

Seoul

June 18

Sri Lanka	29–65	Saudi Arabia
Scoring by half: 21–34, 8–31

Seoul

June 19

Saudi Arabia	109–43	Malaysia
Scoring by half: 50–27, 59–16

Seoul

June 19

Hong Kong	61–39	Sri Lanka
Scoring by half: 33–21, 28–18

Seoul

June 20

Malaysia	73–96	Chinese Taipei
Scoring by half: 39–44, 34–52

Seoul

June 20

Saudi Arabia	87–60	Hong Kong
Scoring by half: 57–24, 30–36

Seoul

June 21

Chinese Taipei	95–69	Saudi Arabia
Scoring by half: 47–39, 48–30

Seoul

June 21

Sri Lanka	57–91	Malaysia
Scoring by half: 37–51, 20–40

Seoul

== Quarterfinal round ==
=== Group I ===
Team	Pld	W	L	PF	PA	PD	Pts
China	3	3	0	242	173	+69	6
Japan	3	2	1	229	197	+32	5
Saudi Arabia	3	1	2	215	244	−29	4
Uzbekistan	3	0	3	178	250	−72	3

June 22

Japan	88–63	Uzbekistan
Scoring by half: 43–43, 45–20

Seoul

June 22

China	92–69	Saudi Arabia
Scoring by half: 44–30, 48–39

Seoul

June 23

Saudi Arabia	61–80	Japan
Scoring by half: 32–49, 29–31

Seoul

June 23

Uzbekistan	43–77	China
Scoring by half: 21–44, 22–33

Seoul

June 24

Uzbekistan	72–85	Saudi Arabia
Scoring by half: 43–49, 29–36

Seoul

June 24

China	73–61	Japan
Scoring by half: 43–34, 30–27

Seoul

=== Group II ===
Team	Pld	W	L	PF	PA	PD	Pts	Tiebreaker
South Korea	3	2	1	261	193	+68	5	1–1 / 1.156
Chinese Taipei	3	2	1	213	182	+31	5	1–1 / 1.000
Kazakhstan	3	2	1	235	233	+2	5	1–1 / 0.869
Kyrgyzstan	3	0	3	197	298	−101	3	

June 22

South Korea	86–65	Kazakhstan
Scoring by half: 23–26, 33–39

Seoul

June 22

Chinese Taipei	83–52	Kyrgyzstan
Scoring by half: 45–25, 38–27

Seoul

June 23

Kazakhstan	68–67	Chinese Taipei
Scoring by half: 32–34, 36–33

Seoul

June 23

Kyrgyzstan	65–113	South Korea
Scoring by half: 34–55, 31–58

Seoul

June 24

South Korea	62–63	Chinese Taipei
Scoring by half: 32–33, 30–30

Seoul

June 24

Kyrgyzstan	80–102	Kazakhstan
Scoring by half: 36–50, 44–52

Seoul

=== Group III ===
Team	Pld	W	L	PF	PA	PD	Pts
Iran	3	3	0	244	186	+58	6
Philippines	3	2	1	205	210	−5	5
India	3	1	2	224	244	−20	4
Hong Kong	3	0	3	206	239	−33	3

June 22

Iran	68–53	Philippines
Scoring by half: 37–25, 31–28

Seoul

June 22

India	82–73	Hong Kong
Scoring by half: 40–30, 42–43

Seoul

June 23

Hong Kong	68–88	Iran
Scoring by half: 31–51, 37–37

Seoul

June 23

Philippines	83–77	India
Scoring by half: 34–35, 49–42

Seoul

June 24

Philippines	69–65	Hong Kong
Scoring by half: 33–31, 36–34

Seoul

June 24

India	65–88	Iran
Scoring by half: 33–45, 32–43

Seoul

=== Group IV ===
Team	Pld	W	L	PF	PA	PD	Pts
United Arab Emirates	3	3	0	179	154	+25	6
Kuwait	3	2	1	208	181	+27	5
Malaysia	3	1	2	184	200	−16	4
Thailand	3	0	3	170	206	−36	3

June 22

Malaysia	65–73	Kuwait
Scoring by half: 28–40, 37–33

Seoul

June 22

United Arab Emirates	55–51	Thailand
Scoring by half: 32–19, 23–32

Seoul

June 23

Thailand	66–72	Malaysia
Scoring by half: 32–39, 34–33

Seoul

June 23

Kuwait	56–63	United Arab Emirates
Scoring by half: 33–34, 23–29

Seoul

June 24

Kuwait	79–53	Thailand
Scoring by half: 43–36, 36–17

Seoul

June 24

United Arab Emirates	61–47	Malaysia
Scoring by half: 35–20, 26–27

Seoul

== Classification 17th–19th ==
Team	Pld	W	L	PF	PA	PD	Pts
Jordan	2	2	0	141	93	+48	4
Indonesia	2	1	1	151	131	+20	3
Sri Lanka	2	0	2	87	155	−68	2

June 22

Jordan	76–61	Indonesia
Scoring by half: 41–35, 35–26

Seoul

June 23

Sri Lanka	32–65	Jordan
Scoring by half: 25–38, 7–27

Seoul

June 24

Indonesia	90–55	Sri Lanka
Scoring by half: 47–29, 43–26

Seoul

== Classification 5th–16th ==
=== 15th place ===
June 25

Thailand	66–78	Hong Kong
Scoring by half: 39–41, 27–37

Seoul

=== 13th place ===
June 25

Malaysia	72–86	India
Scoring by half: 39–38, 33–48

Seoul

=== 11th place ===
June 25

Kuwait	70–63	Philippines
Scoring by half: 30–34, 40–29

Seoul

=== 9th place ===
June 25

United Arab Emirates	2–0	Iran
Walkover

Seoul

=== 7th place ===
June 26

Uzbekistan	80–65	Kyrgyzstan
Scoring by half: 42–23, 38–42

Seoul

=== 5th place ===
June 26

Saudi Arabia	82–95	Kazakhstan
Scoring by half: 42–51, 40–44

Seoul

== Final round ==
Semifinals
June 25
China	52
Chinese Taipei	42
June 25
South Korea	97
Japan	78

Final
June 26
China	87
South Korea	78
3rd place
June 26
Chinese Taipei	63
Japan	69

=== Semifinals ===
June 25

China	52–42	Chinese Taipei
Scoring by half: 20–19, 32–23

Seoul

June 25

Japan	78–97	South Korea
Scoring by half: 41–53, 37–44

Seoul

=== 3rd place ===
June 26

Chinese Taipei	63–69	Japan
Scoring by half: 31–37, 32–32

Seoul

=== Final ===
June 26

South Korea	78–87	China
Scoring by half: 32–39, 46–48

Seoul

== Final standings ==
Qualified for the 1996 Summer Olympics

Rank	Team	Record
1st place, gold medalist(s)	China	9–0
2nd place, silver medalist(s)	South Korea	6–2
3rd place, bronze medalist(s)	Japan	7–2
4	Chinese Taipei	6–3
5	Kazakhstan	6–2
6	Saudi Arabia	4–4
7	Uzbekistan	3–4
8	Kyrgyzstan	3–5
9	United Arab Emirates	5–2
10	Iran	5–3
11	Kuwait	4–4
12	Philippines	2–5
13	India	4–4
14	Malaysia	3–5
15	Hong Kong	2–6
16	Thailand	1–7
17	Jordan	2–4
18	Indonesia	1–5
19	Sri Lanka	0–6

== Awards ==
1995 Asian champions

China
Tenth title

- Most Valuable Player: (South Korea) Hur Jae
- Best Scorer: (South Korea) Hur Jae
- Best 3-Pointer: (Hong Kong) Yung Kam Wah
- Sportsmanship Award: (Kazakhstan) Oleg Melechtchenko
