= 1971 ABC Championship =

1971 FIBA Asia Cup
6th Asian Basketball Championship

Tournament details
- Host country: Japan
- Dates: October 30 – November 10
- Teams: 9 (from all Asian confederations)
- Venue: 1 (in 1 host city)

Final positions
- Champions: Japan (2nd title)

The 1971 Asian Basketball Confederation Championship for Men were held in Tokyo, Japan.

== Results ==
Team	Pld	W	L	PF	PA	PD	Pts
Japan	8	8	0	734	427	+307	16
Philippines	8	7	1	808	572	+236	15
South Korea	8	6	2	784	523	+261	14
Taiwan	8	5	3	654	577	+77	13
Malaysia	8	4	4	588	613	−25	12
India	8	3	5	563	632	−69	11
Thailand	8	2	6	544	692	−148	10
Singapore	8	1	7	548	806	−258	9
Hong Kong	8	0	8	493	874	−381	8

October 30

Singapore	80–134	Philippines
Scoring by half: 31–68, 49–66

Yoyogi National Gymnasium, Tokyo

October 30

Japan	79–44	Thailand
Scoring by half: 35–15, 44–29

Yoyogi National Gymnasium, Tokyo

October 30

Hong Kong	51–125	South Korea
Scoring by half: 24–58, 27–67

Yoyogi National Gymnasium, Tokyo

October 30

Malaysia	80–68	India
Scoring by half: 45–33, 35–35

Yoyogi National Gymnasium, Tokyo

October 31

Thailand	98–58	Singapore
Scoring by half: 37–26, 61–32

Yoyogi National Gymnasium, Tokyo

October 31

Taiwan	92–69	Malaysia
Scoring by half: 42–36, 50–33

Yoyogi National Gymnasium, Tokyo

October 31

Philippines	133–57	Hong Kong
Scoring by half: 64–28, 69–29

Yoyogi National Gymnasium, Tokyo

October 31

South Korea	83–57	India
Scoring by half: 55–22, 28–35

Yoyogi National Gymnasium, Tokyo

November 1

Hong Kong	38–131	Japan
Scoring by half: 16–63, 22–68

Yoyogi National Gymnasium, Tokyo

November 1

Singapore	62–98	Taiwan
Scoring by half: 38–54, 24–44

Yoyogi National Gymnasium, Tokyo

November 1

Malaysia	57–79	South Korea
Scoring by half: 29–40, 28–39

Yoyogi National Gymnasium, Tokyo

November 1

Thailand	67–75	India
Scoring by half: 32–32, 35–43

Yoyogi National Gymnasium, Tokyo

November 3

Philippines	95–53	Malaysia
Scoring by half: 43–30, 52–23

Yoyogi National Gymnasium, Tokyo

November 3

India	80–79	Singapore
Scoring by half: 40–41, 40–38

Yoyogi National Gymnasium, Tokyo

November 3

Japan	86–57	Taiwan
Scoring by half: 50–25, 36–32

Yoyogi National Gymnasium, Tokyo

November 3

South Korea	131–61	Thailand
Scoring by half: 66–27, 65–34

Yoyogi National Gymnasium, Tokyo

November 4

Taiwan	96–59	Hong Kong
Scoring by half: 50–25, 46–34

Yoyogi National Gymnasium, Tokyo

November 4

Japan	87–56	India
Scoring by half: 42–32, 45–24

Yoyogi National Gymnasium, Tokyo

November 4

Thailand	72–121	Philippines
Scoring by half: 33–59, 39–62

Yoyogi National Gymnasium, Tokyo

November 6

South Korea	80–88	Philippines
Scoring by half: 34–44, 46–44

Yoyogi National Gymnasium, Tokyo

November 6

Hong Kong	72–96	Singapore
Scoring by half: 32–38, 40–58

Yoyogi National Gymnasium, Tokyo

November 6

India	64–71	Taiwan
Scoring by half: 32–36, 32–35

Yoyogi National Gymnasium, Tokyo

November 7

Japan	86–48	Malaysia
Scoring by half: 45–26, 41–22

Yoyogi National Gymnasium, Tokyo

November 7

Thailand	85–76	Hong Kong
Scoring by half: 47–34, 38–42

Yoyogi National Gymnasium, Tokyo

November 7

Singapore	49–125	South Korea
Scoring by half: 19–59, 30–66

Yoyogi National Gymnasium, Tokyo

November 8

Hong Kong	74–101	India
Scoring by half: 34–57, 40–44

Yoyogi National Gymnasium, Tokyo

November 8

Philippines	69–93	Japan
Scoring by half: 39–45, 30–48

Yoyogi National Gymnasium, Tokyo

November 8

Malaysia	71–50	Thailand
Scoring by half: 24–22, 47–28

Yoyogi National Gymnasium, Tokyo

November 8

Taiwan	84–93 (2OT)	South Korea
Scoring by half: 34–34, 33–33 Overtime: 10–10, 7–16

Yoyogi National Gymnasium, Tokyo

November 9

Malaysia	107–66	Hong Kong
Scoring by half: 57–33, 50–33

Yoyogi National Gymnasium, Tokyo

November 9

Japan	96–47	Singapore
Scoring by half: 54–21, 42–26

Yoyogi National Gymnasium, Tokyo

November 9

Taiwan	81–67	Thailand
Scoring by half: 42–34, 39–33

Yoyogi National Gymnasium, Tokyo

November 9

India	62–91	Philippines
Scoring by half: 30–43, 32–48

Yoyogi National Gymnasium, Tokyo

November 10

Singapore	77–103	Malaysia
Scoring by half: 41–48, 36–55

Yoyogi National Gymnasium, Tokyo

November 10

Philippines	77–75	Taiwan
Scoring by half: 40–45, 37–30

Yoyogi National Gymnasium, Tokyo

November 10

South Korea	68–76	Japan
Scoring by half: 30–37, 38–39

Yoyogi National Gymnasium, Tokyo

== Final standings ==
Qualified for the 1972 Summer Olympics

Rank	Team	Record
1st place, gold medalist(s)	Japan	8–0
2nd place, silver medalist(s)	Philippines	7–1
3rd place, bronze medalist(s)	South Korea	6–2
4	Taiwan	5–3
5	Malaysia	4–4
6	India	3–5
7	Thailand	2–6
8	Singapore	1–7
9	Hong Kong	0–8

== Awards ==
1971 Asian champions

Japan
Second title
