= Palestine men's national basketball team =

Palestine
- FIBA ranking: 104 ▼4 (13 July 2026)
- Joined FIBA: 1963
- FIBA zone: FIBA Asia
- National federation: Palestinian Basketball Federation
- Coach: Harry Savaya

FIBA Asia Cup
- Appearances: 1
- Medals: None

AfroBasket
- Appearances: 2
- Medals: (bronze) Bronze: (1964)
Home	Away

The Palestine men's national basketball team represents Palestine in international basketball competitions. It is managed by the Palestinian Basketball Federation.

The team won a bronze medal in the 1964 FIBA Africa Championship for men and took a tenth-place finish in the 2015 FIBA Asia Championship.

== Competitive record ==
=== FIBA Asia Cup ===
Year	Position	Pld	W	L
(Philippines) 1960	Did not enter			
(Taiwan) 1963	Did not enter			
(Malaysia) 1965	Did not enter			
(South Korea) 1967	Did not enter			
(Thailand) 1969	Did not enter			
(Japan) 1971	Did not enter			
(Philippines) 1973	Did not enter			
(Thailand) 1975	Did not enter			
(Malaysia) 1977	Did not enter			
(Japan) 1979	Did not enter			
(India) 1981	Did not enter			
(Hong Kong) 1983	Did not enter			
(Malaysia) 1985	Did not enter			
(Thailand) 1987	Did not enter			
(China) 1989	Did not enter			
(Japan) 1991	Did not enter			
(Indonesia) 1993	Did not enter			
(South Korea) 1995	Did not enter			
(Saudi Arabia) 1997	Did not enter			
(Japan) 1999	Did not enter			
(China) 2001	Did not enter			
(China) 2003	Did not enter			
(Qatar) 2005	Did not enter			
(Japan) 2007	Did not enter			
(China) 2009	Did not enter			
(China) 2011	Did not enter			
(Philippines) 2013	Did not enter			
(China) 2015	10th place	8	4	4
(Lebanon) 2017	Did not qualify			
(Indonesia) 2022	Did not qualify			
(Saudi Arabia) 2025	Did not qualify			
2029	To be determined			
Total	1/31	8	4	4

=== WABA Championship ===
Year	Position	Pld	W	L
(Lebanon) 1999	Did not enter			
(Lebanon) 2000	Did not enter			
(Jordan) 2001	Did not enter			
(Jordan) (Iran) 2002	Did not enter			
(Iran) 2004	Did not enter			
(Lebanon) 2005	Did not enter			
(Jordan) 2008	4th place	3	0	3
(Iraq) 2010	4th place	3	0	3
(Iraq) 2011	Did not enter			
(Jordan) 2012	5th place	5	2	3
(Iran) 2013	Did not enter			
(Jordan) 2014	5th place	5	1	4
(Jordan) 2015	3rd place	4	2	2
(Jordan) 2016	Did not enter			
(Jordan) 2017	6th place	5	0	5
Total	6/15	25	5	20

=== AfroBasket ===
Year	Position	Pld	W	L
(Morocco) 1964	3rd place	5	2	3
(Egypt) 1970	6th place	4	1	3
Total	1 bronze	9	3	6

== Team ==
=== Current roster ===
Competition: 2025 FIBA Asia Cup qualification
Opposition: Jordan (November 25, 2024)
Venue: King Abdullah Sports City, Jeddah

Palestine national basketball team – 2025 FIBA Asia Cup Qualification Group D roster
Players
Coaches

Pos.	No.	Name	Age – Date of birth	Height	Club	Ctr.
SF	0	Hasan Dweikat	23 – September 6, 2001	2.00 m (6 ft 7 in)	Eibal	(Palestine)
PF	2	Elias Sawalha	22 – April 8, 2002	2.00 m (6 ft 7 in)	Orthodox Beit Sahour	(Palestine)
PG	4	Brian Halums (NP)	27 – September 18, 1997	1.96 m (6 ft 5 in)	Tamil Nadu	(India)
SG	5	Jamal Mayali	26 – October 20, 1998	1.92 m (6 ft 4 in)	Orthodox Ramallah	(Palestine)
C	6	Salah Halawani	21 – May 15, 2003	2.04 m (6 ft 8 in)	Orthodox Ramallah	(Palestine)
SG	10	Tamer Habash	31 – November 19, 1992	1.92 m (6 ft 4 in)	Qalandia SC	(Palestine)
F	11	Yousef Albabeish	20 – March 5, 2004	1.98 m (6 ft 6 in)	Orthodox Beit Sahour	(Palestine)
C	15	Salim Sakakini	37 – March 25, 1987	1.99 m (6 ft 6 in)	Sareyyet Ramallah	(Palestine)
SF	30	Ahmad Sunjuq	26 – February 18, 1998	1.92 m (6 ft 4 in)	Orthodox Beit Sahour	(Palestine)
F	34	Mohammed Abushamsiya	22 – July 8, 2002	1.95 m (6 ft 5 in)	Orthodox Ramallah	(Palestine)
PG	45	Ramzi Qumsieh	21 – December 16, 2002	1.85 m (6 ft 1 in)	Orthodox Beit Sahour	(Palestine)
PF	88	Mohammed Mousa	31 – October 26, 1993	2.00 m (6 ft 7 in)	Orthodox Ramallah	(Palestine)

Head coach

- (Greece) Ioannis Diamantakos

Assistant coach(es)

- (Palestine) Salim Hosary

Legend

- (C) Team captain
- (NP) Naturalized player
- Club – describes last
  club before the tournament
- Age – describes age
  on October 30, 2024

=== Coaches ===
- (United States) Paul Coughter (2019–2023)
- (Greece) Ioannis Diamantakos (2023–present)
