= WABA Championship =

Annual sports competition

- Sport: Basketball
- Founded: 1999
- No. of teams: 7
- Country: WABA member nations
- Continent: FIBA Asia (Asia)
- Most recent champion: Lebanon (5th title)
- Most titles: Iran (6 titles)

The WABA Championship is an international basketball tournament which takes place every year between national men's teams from West Asia. The tournament is also known as the West Asian Basketball Championship.

The tournament is organised by the West Asia Basketball Association, a subzone of the FIBA Asia. It serves as the West Asian qualifying tournament for the FIBA Asia Cup and FIBA Asia Challenge.

== Summary ==
Year	Host	Final			Third place game		
Year	Host	Champion	Score	Second place	Third place	Score	Fourth place
1999; Details	(Lebanon); Beirut	Syria	No playoffs	Lebanon	Jordan	No playoffs	Iran
2000; Details	(Lebanon); Beirut	Lebanon	No playoffs	Syria	Iraq	No playoffs	Iran
2001; Details	(Jordan); Amman	Syria	No playoffs	Lebanon	Iran	No playoffs	Iraq
2002; Details	(Jordan) / (Iran); Amman / Tehran	Jordan	No playoffs	Iran	Iraq	No playoffs	Only Three Teams Competed
2004; Details	(Iran); Tehran	Iran	No playoffs	Syria	Jordan	No playoffs	Lebanon
2005; Details	(Lebanon); Beirut	Iran	No playoffs	Lebanon	Jordan	No playoffs	Yemen
2008; Details	(Jordan); Amman	Lebanon	No playoffs	Jordan	Syria	No playoffs	Palestine
2010; Details	(Iraq); Duhok	Iran	No playoffs	Iraq	Syria	No playoffs	Palestine
2011; Details	(Iraq); Duhok	Iran	No playoffs	Jordan	Syria	No playoffs	Iraq
2012; Details	(Jordan); Amman	Lebanon	No playoffs	Iran	Jordan	No playoffs	Syria
2013; Details	(Iran); Tehran	Iran	No playoffs	Lebanon	Jordan	No playoffs	Iraq
2014; Details	(Jordan); Amman	Jordan	No playoffs	Iran	Syria	No playoffs	Iraq
2015; Details	(Jordan); Amman	Lebanon	No playoffs	Jordan	Palestine	No playoffs	Syria
2016; Details	(Jordan); Amman	Iran	No playoffs	Jordan	Iraq	No playoffs	Lebanon
2017; Details	(Jordan); Amman	Lebanon	No playoffs	Iran	Jordan	No playoffs	Iraq

== Medal table ==
Rank	Nation	Gold	Silver	Bronze	Total
1	Iran	6	4	1	11
2	Lebanon	5	4	0	9
3	Jordan	2	4	6	12
4	Syria	2	2	4	8
5	Iraq	0	1	3	4
6	Palestine	0	0	1	1
7	Yemen	0	0	0	0
Totals (7 entries)		15	15	15	45

== Participating nations ==
Nation	(Lebanon) 1999	(Lebanon) 2000	(Jordan) 2001	(Jordan) (Iran) 2002	(Iran) 2004	(Lebanon) 2005	(Jordan) 2008	(Iraq) 2010	(Iraq) 2011	(Jordan) 2012	(Iran) 2013	(Jordan) 2014	(Jordan) 2015	(Jordan) 2016	(Jordan) 2017	Years
Iran	4th	4th	3rd	2nd	1st	1st		1st	1st	2nd	1st	2nd		1st	2nd	13
Iraq	5th	3rd	4th	3rd	5th	5th		2nd	4th		4th	4th	5th	3rd	4th	13
Jordan	3rd	5th	5th	1st	3rd	3rd	2nd		2nd	3rd	3rd	1st	2nd	2nd	3rd	14
Lebanon	2nd	1st	2nd		4th	2nd	1st			1st	2nd		1st	4th	1st	11
Palestine							4th	4th		5th		5th	3rd		6th	6
Syria	1st	2nd	1st		2nd		3rd	3rd	3rd	4th		3rd	4th	5th	5th	12
Yemen						4th				6th		6th				3
Total	5	5	5	3	5	5	4	4	4	6	4	6	5	5	6	
