= Vietnam men's national basketball team =

Vietnam
- FIBA ranking: 130 ▲1 (1 September 2026)
- Joined FIBA: 1952
- FIBA zone: FIBA Asia
- National federation: Vietnam Basketball Federation
- Coach: Todd Purves

Olympic Games
- Appearances: None

FIBA World Cup
- Appearances: None

FIBA Asia Cup
- Appearances: 2
- Medals: None
Home	Away

The Vietnam national basketball team (Vietnamese: Đội tuyển bóng rổ nam quốc gia Việt Nam) is the men's basketball team representing Vietnam in international competitions. The governing body of Vietnamese basketball operations is the Vietnam Basketball Federation.

Vietnam had its best finish at the 2019 Southeast Asian Games when it earned the bronze medal, the country's first ever basketball medal at an international event.

== Team ==
=== Current roster ===
Roster for the 2029 FIBA Asia Cup qualification.

Vietnam Men's National Basketball Team – 2029 FIBA Asia Cup qualification roster
Players
Coaches

Pos.	No.	Name	Age – Date of birth	Height	Club	Ctr.
F	0	Le Quang	19 – 29 December 2006	1.85 m (6 ft 1 in)	Ho Chi Minh City Wings	(Vietnam)
C	1	Nguyen Huynh Phu Vinh	28 – 7 May 1998	2.03 m (6 ft 8 in)	Saigon Heat	(Vietnam)
G	3	Nguyen Hoang Phuc	23 – 11 April 2003	1.90 m (6 ft 3 in)	Nha Trang Dolphins	(Vietnam)
G	4	Huynh Thanh Tam	27 – 11 August 1999	1.80 m (5 ft 11 in)	Cantho Catfish	(Vietnam)
F	10	Dang Thai Hung	33 – 4 June 1993	1.89 m (6 ft 2 in)	Hanoi Buffaloes	(Vietnam)
F	11	Le Khac Dang Khoa	24 – 24 March 2002	1.85 m (6 ft 1 in)	Nha Trang Dolphins	(Vietnam)
G	13	Nguyen Anh Kiet	24 – 24 February 2002	1.82 m (6 ft 0 in)	Saigon Heat	(Vietnam)
F	14	Vo Huy Hoan	28 – 10 July 1998	1.83 m (6 ft 0 in)	Nha Trang Dolphins	(Vietnam)
F	23	Tam Dinh	36 – 10 April 1990	1.93 m (6 ft 4 in)	Hanoi Buffaloes	(Vietnam)
G	47	Huynh Truc Nhan	24 – 24 August 2002	1.80 m (5 ft 11 in)	Saigon Heat	(Vietnam)
G	84	Huynh Vinh Quang	27 – 11 January 1999	1.79 m (5 ft 10 in)	Nha Trang Dolphins	(Vietnam)
C	89	Dau Trung Kien	26 – 30 July 2000	2.00 m (6 ft 7 in)	Cantho Catfish	(Vietnam)

Head coach

- (United States) Todd Purves

Assistant coach(es)

- (Vietnam) Nguyen Tran Minh Tri

Legend

- (C) Team captain
- Club – describes last
  club before the tournament
- Age – describes age
  on 31 August 2026

== Competitive record ==
=== FIBA Asia Cup ===
Year	Position	Pld	W	L
As South Vietnam
(Philippines) 1960	did not enter			
(Taiwan) 1963	8th place	10	0	10
(Malaysia) 1965	10th place	7	1	6
(South Korea) 1967	did not enter			
(Thailand) 1969	did not enter			
(Japan) 1971	did not enter			
(Philippines) 1973	did not enter			
(Thailand) 1975	did not enter			
As Vietnam
(Malaysia) 1977	did not enter			
(Japan) 1979	did not enter			
(India) 1981	did not enter			
(Hong Kong) 1983	did not enter			
(Malaysia) 1985	did not enter			
(Thailand) 1987	did not enter			
(China) 1989	did not enter			
(Japan) 1991	did not enter			
(Indonesia) 1993	did not enter			
(South Korea) 1995	did not enter			
(Saudi Arabia) 1997	did not enter			
(Japan) 1999	did not qualify			
(China) 2001	did not qualify			
(China) 2003	did not qualify			
(Qatar) 2005	did not qualify			
(Japan) 2007	did not enter			
(China) 2009	did not enter			
(China) 2011	did not enter			
(Philippines) 2013	did not enter			
(China) 2015	did not enter			
(Lebanon) 2017	did not qualify			
(Indonesia) 2022	did not enter			
(Saudi Arabia) 2025	did not qualify			
2029	did not qualify			
Total	2/32	17	1	16

=== SEABA Championship ===
- 2001 SEABA Championship: 6th
- 2003 SEABA Championship: 4th
- 2005 SEABA Championship: 5th
- 2017 SEABA Championship: 6th

=== Southeast Asian Games ===
- 2001 Southeast Asian Games: 6th
- 2003 Southeast Asian Games: 6th
- 2011 Southeast Asian Games: 6th
- 2015 Southeast Asian Games: 7th
- 2017 Southeast Asian Games: 6th
- 2019 Southeast Asian Games: (bronze)
- 2021 Southeast Asian Games: 4th
- 2023 Southeast Asian Games: 6th
- 2025 Southeast Asian Games: 5th

== Head coach position ==
- (United Kingdom) Anthony Garbelotto – 2014–2017
- (United States) Donte' Hill – 2017
- (United States) Todd Purves – 2018, 2023
- (United States) Kevin Yurkus – 2019–2022
- (United States) Matthew Van Pelt – 2022

== Kit ==
2017–present: Hemero

== Sponsor ==
2017: Vinaphone

== See also ==
- Saigon Heat
- ASEAN Basketball League
- Sport in Vietnam
- Vietnam men's national 3x3 team
- Vietnam women's national basketball team
