= 2017 FIBA Asia Cup qualification =

Qualification to 2017 FIBA Asia Cup

Qualification for the 2017 FIBA Asia Cup were held to determine the participants in the 2017 FIBA Asia Cup. Lebanon secured qualification by being named as hosts. The other fifteen berths were disputed per FIBA Asia zone, and via the 2016 FIBA Asia Challenge.

== Qualification format ==
The following are eligible to participate:

- The three best teams from the subzone of East Asia, the two best teams from the subzone of West Asia and the Winners from the subzones of Central Asia, South Asia, Southeast Asia, and the Gulf.
- The five best-placed teams from the previous FIBA Asia Challenge would qualify the same number of teams for their respective subzones.
- Two wild card teams from FIBA Oceania: Australia and New Zealand.
- The host nation would clinch one of the berths allocated for its subzone.

Berths
Zone	Allocated berths	Additional berths from FIBA Asia Challenge	Total
Central Asia	1	0	1
East Asia	3	2	5
Gulf	1	0	1
South Asia	1	0	1
Southeast Asia	1	0	1
West Asia	2	3	5*
Wild Cards	2	—N/a	2
Total	11	5	16

* Including the host nation Lebanon.

== Qualified teams ==
Team	Qualified as	Date	Last appearance	Total appearances
Lebanon*	Host Nation	20 January 2017	2015	8
Kazakhstan	2017 Central Asian Qualifying; Round Winners	1 June 2017	2015	8
Chinese Taipei	2017 East Asian Champions	5 June 2017	2015	23
South Korea	2017 East Asian Runners-up	5 June 2017	2015	28
Japan	2017 East Asian 3rd Place	4 June 2017	2015	27
China	2017 East Asian 4th Place	4 June 2017	2015	21
Hong Kong	2017 East Asian 5th Place	6 June 2017	2015	5
Qatar	2016 Gulf Champions	9 September 2016	2015	9
India	2017 South Asian Champions	23 May 2017	2015	24
Philippines	2017 Southeast Asian Champions	18 May 2017	2015	26
Iran	2017 West Asian Runners-up	1 February 2017	2015	16
Jordan	2017 West Asian 3rd Place	31 January 2017	2015	14
Iraq	2017 West Asian 4th Place	2 February 2017	1987	3
Syria	2017 West Asian 5th Place	1 February 2017	2011	5
Australia	Wild Card	2016	None	N/A
New Zealand	Wild Card	2016	None	N/A

* Lebanon is also the 2017 West Asian Champions.

== FIBA Asia Challenge ==
The 6th FIBA Asia Challenge was held at Tehran, Iran from 9 to 18 September 2016.

Rank	Team	Note
1st place, gold medalist(s)	Iran	West Asia (+1)
2nd place, silver medalist(s)	South Korea	East Asia (+1)
3rd place, bronze medalist(s)	Jordan	West Asia (+2)
4	Iraq	West Asia (+3)
5	China	East Asia (+2)
6	Japan	
7	India	
8	Chinese Taipei	
9	Philippines	
10	Qatar	
11	Kazakhstan	
12	Thailand	

== Central Asia ==
The 2017 Central Asian Qualifying Round was a one-game playoff between Kazakhstan and Kyrgyzstan in Almaty.

1 June 2017

Kazakhstan	81–71	Kyrgyzstan
Scoring by quarter: 22–16, 26–14, 23–17, 10–24

Almaty

== East Asia ==
2017 EABA Championship
4th East Asian Basketball Championship

Tournament details
- Host country: Japan
- Dates: 3–7 June
- Teams: 6 (from 8 federations)
- Venue: 1 (in 1 host city)

Final positions
- Champions: Chinese Taipei (1st title)

Tournament statistics
- Top scorer: (China) Zhao Y.H. (19.8)
- Top rebounds: (China) Hu J.Q. (13.0)
- Top assists: (China) Sun M.H. (7.0)
- PPG (Team): South Korea (87.8)
- RPG (Team): Chinese Taipei (43.0)
- APG (Team): South Korea (25.8)

Official website
- Official Website

The 4th EABA Championship was held in Nagano, Japan from 3 to 7 June 2017. The top five nations will qualify for the main tournament. On 7 June 2017, Chinese Taipei defeated the defending champions South Korea in the final, 77–64. Hosts Japan subdued China in the bronze medal game, 76–58. All four semifinalists qualified to the 2017 FIBA Asia Cup, along with Hong Kong, who took the fifth and last East Asian spot by defeating Macau, 96–81, the day before. The draw was held in Tokyo, Japan on 6 March 2017 to determine the composition of the two groups.

=== Preliminary round ===
==== Group A ====
Pos	Team	Pld	W	L	PF	PA	PD	Pts	Qualification
1	Japan (H, Q)	2	2	0	197	119	+78	4	Qualification to semifinals and 2017 FIBA Asia Cup
2	South Korea (Q)	2	1	1	181	136	+45	3	Qualification to semifinals and 2017 FIBA Asia Cup
3	Macau	2	0	2	105	228	−123	2	Qualification to 5th place playoff

Source: FIBA
(H) Hosts; (Q) Qualified for the phase indicated

3 June 2017
15:00

Report

Japan	78–72	South Korea
Scoring by quarter: 23–18, 14–15, 21–23, 20–16
Pts: Brown 15; Rebs: Brown 8 Asts: Brown 5		Pts: Lee D.S. 15; Rebs: Heo I.Y., Heo H. 7 Asts: Heo H. 5

Nagano Mashima General Sports Arena, Nagano
Referees: Ferdinand Pascual (PHI), Hsieh Wen-wei (TPE), Zhang Zhiwei (CHN)

4 June 2017
15:00

Report

Macau	47–119	Japan
Scoring by quarter: 15–25, 6–31, 13–27, 13–36
Pts: Hoi 12; Rebs: Lo 5 Asts: 3 players at 2 each		Pts: Hiejima 17; Rebs: Takeuchi 9 Asts: Hiejima 10

Nagano Mashima General Sports Arena, Nagano
Referees: Harja Jaladri (INA), Chan Ho Ming (HKG), Zhang Zhiwei (CHN)

5 June 2017
16:45

Report

South Korea	109–58	Macau
Scoring by quarter: 30–14, 14–12, 32–14, 33–18
Pts: Lee D.S. 26; Rebs: Jeong, Park 7 Asts: Heo H. 7		Pts: Chan 16; Rebs: Chan 15; Asts: Lam 4

Nagano Mashima General Sports Arena, Nagano
Referees: Ferdinand Pascual (PHI), Chan Ho Ming (HKG), Hsieh Wen-wei (TPE)

==== Group B ====
Pos	Team	Pld	W	L	PF	PA	PD	Pts	Qualification
1	China (Q)	2	2	0	186	123	+63	4	Qualification to semifinals and 2017 FIBA Asia Cup
2	Chinese Taipei (Q)	2	1	1	155	153	+2	3	Qualification to semifinals and 2017 FIBA Asia Cup
3	Hong Kong	2	0	2	117	182	−65	2	Qualification to 5th place playoff

Source: FIBA
(Q) Qualified for the phase indicated

3 June 2017
17:15

Report

China	96–63	Chinese Taipei
Scoring by quarter: 21–8, 27–17, 19–13, 29–25
Pts: Zhao 22; Rebs: Hu 8 Asts: Sun 8		Pts: Davis 15; Rebs: Davis 9 Asts: Chiang 4

Nagano Mashima General Sports Arena, Nagano
Referees: Harja Jaladri (INA), Yuji Higashi (JPN), Shin Gi Rok (KOR)

4 June 2017
17:15

Report

Hong Kong	60–90	China
Scoring by quarter: 9–24, 15–29, 11–17, 25–20
Pts: Reid 16; Rebs: Reid 10; Asts: Chan 5, Lo 5		Pts: Hu 17; Rebs: Hu 12; Asts: Sun 9

Nagano Mashima General Sports Arena, Nagano
Referees: Ferdinand Pascual (PHI), Chao Hio Tong (MAC), Takeo Kitazawa (JPN)

5 June 2017
19:00

Report

Chinese Taipei	92–57	Hong Kong
Scoring by quarter: 22–11, 22–13, 29–22, 19–11

Nagano Mashima General Sports Arena, Nagano
Referees: Harja Jaladri (INA), Chao Hio Tong (MAC), Takeo Kitazawa (JPN)

=== Classification 5th–6th ===
- Winner qualifies to the 2017 FIBA Asia Cup.

6 June 2017
14:30

Report

Macau	81–96	Hong Kong
Scoring by quarter: 11–17, 9–29, 32–34, 29–16

Nagano Mashima General Sports Arena, Nagano
Referees: Yuji Higashi (JPN), Wen-Wei Hsieh (TPE), Gi Rok Shin (KOR)

=== Final round ===
Semifinals
6 June
Japan	73
Chinese Taipei	78
6 June
China	104
South Korea (OT)	106

Final
7 June
Chinese Taipei	77
South Korea	64
3rd place
7 June
Japan	76
China	58

==== Semifinals ====
6 June 2017
19:00

Report

Japan	73–78	Chinese Taipei
Scoring by quarter: 15–25, 11–15, 21–15, 26–23
Pts: Hiejima 20; Rebs: Brown 8 Asts: Hashimoto 4		Pts: Davis 29; Rebs: Davis 17; Asts: Chiang 5

Nagano Mashima General Sports Arena, Nagano
Referees: Harja Jaladri (INA), Chao Hio Tong (MAC), Zhang Zhiwei (CHN)

6 June 2017
16:45

Report

China	104–106 (OT)	South Korea
Scoring by quarter: 21–20, 15–25, 25–19, 32–29, Overtime: 11–13
Pts: Sun 28; Rebs: Hu 18; Asts: Hu 7		Pts: Heo I.Y. 22; Rebs: three players 5 Asts: Lee J.H. 6

Nagano Mashima General Sports Arena, Nagano
Referees: Ferdinand Pascual (PHI), Chan Ho Ming (HKG), Takeo Kitazawa (JPN)

==== 3rd place ====
7 June 2017
18:00

Report

China	58–76	Japan
Scoring by quarter: 9–26, 11–9, 21–22, 17–19
Pts: Zhao 20; Rebs: Hu 14; Asts: Sun 4		Pts: Brown 21; Rebs: Brown 11; Asts: Tanaka 5

Nagano Mashima General Sports Arena, Nagano
Referees: Ferdinand Pascual (PHI), Wen-Wei Hsieh (TPE), Harja Jaladri (INA)

==== Final ====
7 June 2017
15:45

Report

South Korea	64–77	Chinese Taipei
Scoring by quarter: 20–15, 14–24, 17–24, 13–14
Pts: Heo I.Y. 18; Rebs: Lee J.H. 7 Asts: Heo H., Lee D.S. 6		Pts: Liu 23; Rebs: Davis 13; Asts: Yu 4

Nagano Mashima General Sports Arena, Nagano
Referees: Yuji Higashi (JPN), Takeo Kitazawa (JPN), Zhiwei Zhang (CHN)

=== Final standing ===
Rank	Team
1st place, gold medalist(s)	Chinese Taipei
2nd place, silver medalist(s)	South Korea
3rd place, bronze medalist(s)	Japan
4	China
5	Hong Kong
6	Macau

== Persian Gulf ==
2016 GCC Championship
15th Gulf Basketball Championship

Tournament details
- Host country: United Arab Emirates
- Dates: 28 August - 4 September
- Teams: 5 (from 6 federations)
- Venue: 1 (in 1 host city)

Final positions
- Champions: Qatar

The 15th Gulf Basketball Championship was held in Sharjah, United Arab Emirates in September 2016.

Rank	Team	Qualification
1st place, gold medalist(s)	Qatar	Qualification to 2017 FIBA Asia Cup
2nd place, silver medalist(s)	Saudi Arabia	
3rd place, bronze medalist(s)	United Arab Emirates	
4	Bahrain	
5	Oman	

== South Asia ==
2017 SABA Championship
6th South Asian Basketball Championship

Tournament details
- Host country: Maldives
- Dates: 19–23 May
- Teams: 5 (from 8 federations)
- Venue: 1 (in 1 host city)

Final positions
- Champions: India (5th title)

The 6th SABA Championship was held in Malé, Maldives from 19 May to 23 May 2017.

=== Standings ===
Pos	Team	Pld	W	L	PF	PA	PD	Pts	Qualification
1	India (C, Q)	4	4	0	404	218	+186	8	Qualified to 2017 FIBA Asia Cup and 2019 FIBA Basketball World Cup Asian Qualifiers
2	Bangladesh	4	3	1	323	340	−17	7	
3	Sri Lanka	4	1	3	285	312	−27	5 (Note: Considering these teams have 1–1 records against each other; When the quotient system is used, Sri Lanka win the bronze medal as they have an average of 0.913 against 0.771 of Nepal and 0.755 of Maldives.)	
4	Nepal	4	1	3	236	306	−70	5	
5	Maldives (H)	4	1	3	222	294	−72	5	

Updated to match(es) played on 23 May 2017. Source:
Rules for classification: (1) Tournament points, (2) Head-to-head tournament points, (3) Head-to-head goal average, (4) Overall goal average, (5) Drawing of lots
(C) Champions; (H) Hosts; (Q) Qualified for the phase indicated

=== Results ===
All times are in Maldivian Time (UTC+05:00)

19 May 2017
17:00

Report

Bangladesh	76–66	Nepal
Scoring by quarter: 22–14, 17–18, 23–20, 14–14

Maldives Centre For Social Education Youth Center, Malé

19 May 2017
21:00

Report

India	84–42	Maldives
Scoring by quarter: 22–3, 24–12, 22–13, 16–14
Pts: Am. Singh 25		Pts: Zilaal 12

Maldives Centre For Social Education Youth Center, Malé

20 May 2017
17:00

Report

Bangladesh	90–80	Sri Lanka
Scoring by quarter: 25–28, 25–18, 24–20, 16–14

Maldives Centre For Social Education Youth Center, Malé

20 May 2017
21:00

Report

Nepal	61–59	Maldives
Scoring by quarter: 16–16, 13–20, 20–13, 12–10

Maldives Centre For Social Education Youth Center, Malé

21 May 2017
17:00

Report

Sri Lanka	61–88	India
Scoring by quarter: 17–23, 17–27, 15–16, 12–22
Pts: Perera 18		Pts: Am. Singh 28

Maldives Centre For Social Education Youth Center, Malé

21 May 2017
21:00

Report

Maldives	52–86	Bangladesh
Scoring by quarter: 9–12, 8–29, 9–19, 26–26

Maldives Centre For Social Education Youth Center, Malé

22 May 2017
17:00

Report

India	142–71	Bangladesh
Scoring by quarter: 36–9, 32–20, 45–13, 29–29
Pts: Am. Singh 22		Pts: Biswas 25

Maldives Centre For Social Education Youth Center, Malé

22 May 2017
21:00

Report

Sri Lanka	81–65	Nepal
Scoring by quarter: 23–20, 19–15, 16–9, 23–21

Maldives Centre For Social Education Youth Center, Malé

23 May 2017
17:00

Report

Nepal	44–109	India
Scoring by quarter: 6–25, 7–20, 13–45, 18–19
Pts: Shrestha 9		Pts: Bhriguvanshi 22

Maldives Centre For Social Education Youth Center, Malé

23 May 2017
21:00

Report

Maldives	69–63	Sri Lanka
Scoring by quarter: 21–11, 23–22, 12–17, 13–13

Maldives Centre For Social Education Youth Center, Malé

=== Final rankings ===
Qualified for: 2017 FIBA Asia Cup; Round 1 of the 2019 FIBA Basketball World Cup Asian Qualifiers

Rank	Team
1st place, gold medalist(s)	India
2nd place, silver medalist(s)	Bangladesh
3rd place, bronze medalist(s)	Sri Lanka
4th	Nepal
5th	Maldives

== Southeast Asia ==
The 12th SEABA Championship was held in Quezon City, Philippines from 12 to 18 May 2017.

== West Asia ==
2017 WABA Championship
15th West Asian Basketball Championship

Tournament details
- Host country: Jordan
- Dates: 29 January - 2 February
- Teams: 6 (from 7 federations)
- Venue: 1 (in 1 host city)

Final positions
- Champions: Lebanon (5th title)

Tournament statistics
- Top scorer: (Lebanon) El Khatib (22.8)
- Top rebounds: (Palestine) Nunnally (10.4)
- Top assists: (Iraq) Galloway (5.4)
- PPG (Team): Iran (88.4)
- RPG (Team): Iran (46.4); Lebanon
- APG (Team): Iran (16.6)

Official website
- Official Website

The 15th WABA Championship was held in Amman, Jordan from 29 January to 2 February 2017. National teams that participated were Iran, Iraq, Lebanon, Palestine, Syria and hosts Jordan. Only the top four teams excluding Lebanon qualified for the continental joust.

Pos	Team	Pld	W	L	PF	PA	PD	Pts	Qualification
1	Lebanon (C, Q)	5	5	0	400	308	+92	10	Qualified as hosts of 2017 FIBA Asia Cup
2	Iran (Q)	5	4	1	442	317	+125	9	Qualification to 2017 FIBA Asia Cup
3	Jordan (H, Q)	5	3	2	354	361	−7	8	Qualification to 2017 FIBA Asia Cup
4	Iraq (Q)	5	2	3	333	345	−12	7	Qualification to 2017 FIBA Asia Cup
5	Syria (Q)	5	1	4	321	384	−63	6	Qualification to 2017 FIBA Asia Cup
6	Palestine (E)	5	0	5	333	468	−135	5	Eliminated

Source: FIBA
(C) Champions; (E) Eliminated; (H) Hosts; (Q) Qualified for the phase indicated

29 January 2017
15:00

Boxscore

Palestine	65–114	Iran
Scoring by quarter: 9–22, 24–27, 13–33, 19–32
Pts: Tamimi 12; Rebs: Nunnally 4 Asts: Anani 2		Pts: Jamshidi 29; Rebs: Kardoust 9 Asts: Mashayekhi, Kazemi 4

Orthodox Club Arena, Amman

29 January 2017
17:00

Boxscore

Iraq	46–86	Lebanon
Scoring by quarter: 11–23, 14–21, 12–20, 9–22
Pts: Al-Hchaimi; Rebs: Aljuboori 11; Asts: Galloway 4		Pts: Arakji 16; Rebs: Bawji, El Khatib 6 Asts: Arakji, Stephan 3

Orthodox Club Arena, Amman

29 January 2017
19:00

Boxscore

Syria	70–78	Jordan
Scoring by quarter: 19–15, 16–28, 19–17, 16–18
Pts: Madanly 24; Rebs: Saddier 11; Asts: Madanly 5		Pts: Abdeen 25; Rebs: Hussein 11; Asts: Abdeen 8

Orthodox Club Arena, Amman

30 January 2017
15:00

Boxscore

Iran	92–48	Syria
Scoring by quarter: 25–4, 23–12, 17–17, 27–15
Pts: Jamshidi 17; Rebs: Kazemi 10; Asts: Pour 4		Pts: Adribi, Haidar 8 Rebs: Cheikh Ali 5 Asts: Baker, Harbasha 3

Orthodox Club Arena, Amman

30 January 2017
17:00

Boxscore

Lebanon	99–75	Palestine
Scoring by quarter: 29–18, 21–8, 27–21, 22–28
Pts: Stephan 23; Rebs: Majok 9 Asts: Arakji, El Khatib 4		Pts: Abushamala 25; Rebs: Nunnally 9 Asts: Habash 3

Orthodox Club Arena, Amman

30 January 2017
19:00

Boxscore

Jordan	66–62	Iraq
Scoring by quarter: 18–17, 17–10, 13–14, 18–21
Pts: Abdeen, Al-Awadi 19; Rebs: Hussein 12; Asts: Abdeen, Al-Awadi 4		Pts: Galloway 22; Rebs: Al-Khafaji 11; Asts: Galloway 5

Orthodox Club Arena, Amman

31 January 2017
15:00

Boxscore

Iraq	66–53	Syria
Scoring by quarter: 20–16, 16–11, 13–18, 17–8
Pts: Galloway 25; Rebs: Hameed 14; Asts: Galloway 4		Pts: Cheikh Ali 16; Rebs: Cheikh Ali 10; Asts: Harbasha 4

Orthodox Club Arena, Amman

31 January 2017
17:00

Boxscore

Lebanon	65–62	Iran
Scoring by quarter: 14–10, 13–15, 22–22, 16–15
Pts: El Khatib 21; Rebs: Haidar 10; Asts: Mezher, El Khatib 3		Pts: Jamshidi 15; Rebs: Kazemi 9 Asts: Mashayekhi 2

Orthodox Club Arena, Amman

31 January 2017
19:00

Boxscore

Palestine	75–90	Jordan
Scoring by quarter: 25–27, 24–17, 15–26, 11–20
Pts: Abshamala 23; Rebs: Nunnally 12; Asts: Abshamala, Habash 2		Pts: Abdeen 30; Rebs: Zaghab 8 Asts: Al-Awadi 5

Orthodox Club Arena, Amman

1 February 2017
15:00

Boxscore

Iran	92–80	Iraq
Scoring by quarter: 30–21, 26–16, 19–22, 17–21
Pts: Jamshidi 27; Rebs: Kazemi, Yakhchali 8 Asts: Pour 6		Pts: Galloway 29; Rebs: Galloway 8 Asts: Galloway 11

Orthodox Club Arena, Amman

1 February 2017
17:00

Boxscore

Jordan	61–72	Lebanon
Scoring by quarter: 9–27, 18–13, 17–12, 17–20
Pts: Al-Awadi 16; Rebs: three players 4 Asts: Kanaan 4		Pts: El Khatib 33; Rebs: Majok 9 Asts: Arakji 5

Orthodox Club Arena, Amman

1 February 2017
19:00

Boxscore

Syria	86–70	Palestine
Scoring by quarter: 14–23, 29–11, 16–19, 27–17
Pts: Madanly 21; Rebs: Cheikh Ali 19; Asts: Madanly 11		Pts: Abushamala 21; Rebs: Nunnally 15; Asts: Abushamala 4

Orthodox Club Arena, Amman

2 February 2017
15:00

Boxscore

Lebanon	78–64	Syria
Scoring by quarter: 15–13, 12–16, 26–17, 25–18
Pts: Rustom 26; Rebs: Tabet 11; Asts: four players 3		Pts: Harbasha16; Rebs: Adribi 13; Asts: Harbasha5

Orthodox Club Arena, Amman

2 February 2017
17:00

Boxscore

Palestine	48–79	Iraq
Scoring by quarter: 8–22, 11–24, 18–20, 11–13
Pts: Abushamala 12; Rebs: Abushamala, Younis 7 Asts: Abushamala 2		Pts: Galloway 22; Rebs: Hameed 14 10; Asts: Hamad 3

Orthodox Club Arena, Amman

2 February 2017
19:00

Boxscore

Jordan	59–82	Iran
Scoring by quarter: 15–25, 14–19, 14–19, 16–19
Pts: Abdeen 17; Rebs: Zaghab 6 Asts: three players 3		Pts: Yakhchali 21; Rebs: Yakhchali 8 Asts: Mashayekhi 8

Orthodox Club Arena, Amman
