= Iraq men's national basketball team =

Iraq
- FIBA ranking: 81 ▲3 (13 July 2026)
- Joined FIBA: 1948
- FIBA zone: FIBA Asia
- National federation: Iraqi Basketball Association
- Coach: Veselin Matić
- Nickname: Lions of Mesopotamia

Olympic Games
- Appearances: 1

FIBA Asia Cup
- Appearances: 5
Home	Away
Medal record
Event	1st	2nd	3rd
WABA Championship	0	1	3
Arab Nations Basketball Championship	0	4	3
Pan Arab Games	0	1	0
Total	0	6	6

The Iraq national basketball team (Arabic: منتخب العراق لكرة السلة) represents Iraq in international basketball competitions. It is one out of only two Arab nations to ever qualify for the Men's Basketball Tournament at the Summer Olympics. (the other nation being Egypt)

== Competitive record ==
=== Olympic Games ===
Summer Olympics
Year	Position	Pld	W	L
(United Kingdom) 1948	22nd place	7	0	7
Total	1/20	7	0	7

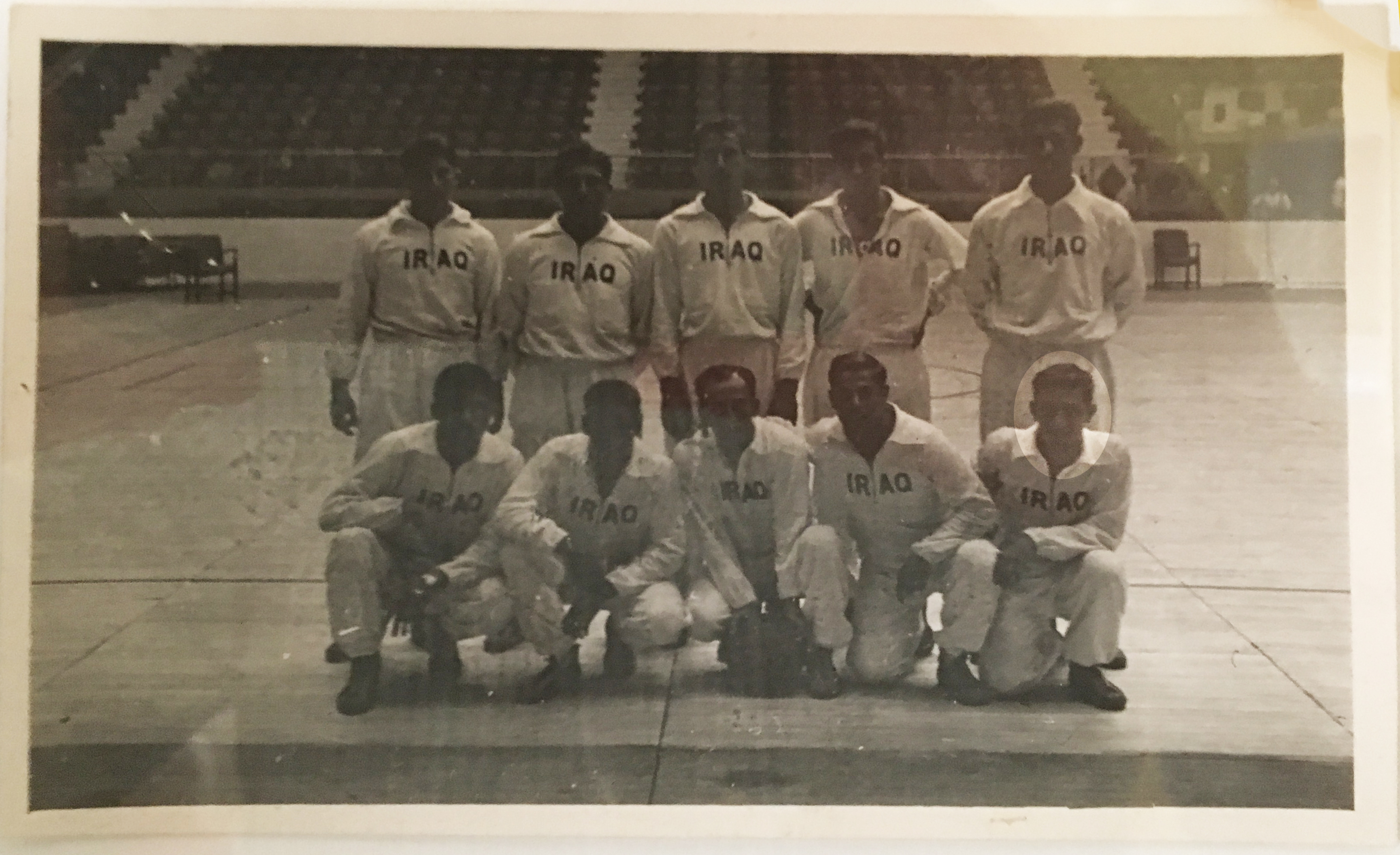
1948 Iraqi Olympic men's basketball team

=== FIBA Asia Cup ===
FIBA Asia Cup
Year	Position	Pld	W	L
(Philippines) 1960	Did not enter			
(China) 1963	Did not enter			
(Malaysia) 1965	Did not enter			
(South Korea) 1967	Did not enter			
(Thailand) 1969	Did not enter			
(Japan) 1971	Did not enter			
(Philippines) 1973	Did not enter			
(Thailand) 1975	Did not enter			
(Malaysia) 1977	6th place	9	3	6
(Japan) 1979	8th place	8	5	3
(India) 1981	Did not enter			
(Hong Kong) 1983	Did not enter			
(Malaysia) 1985	Did not enter			
(Thailand) 1987	9th place	8	5	3
(China) 1989	Did not enter			
(Japan) 1991	Did not enter			
(Indonesia) 1993	Did not enter			
(South Korea) 1995	Did not enter			
(Saudi Arabia) 1997	Did not enter			
(Japan) 1999	Did not enter			
(China) 2001	Did not qualify			
(China) 2003	Did not qualify			
(Qatar) 2005	Did not qualify			
(Japan) 2007	Did not enter			
(China) 2009	Did not enter			
(China) 2011	Did not qualify			
(Philippines) 2013	Did not qualify			
(China) 2015	Did not qualify			
(Lebanon) 2017	11th place	4	1	3
(Indonesia) 2022	Did not qualify			
(Saudi Arabia) 2025	14th place	3	0	3
2029	To be determined			
Total	5/31	32	14	18

=== Asian Games ===
Asian Games
Year	Position	Pld	W	L
(India) 1951	Did not enter			
(Philippines) 1954	Did not enter			
(Japan) 1958	Did not enter			
(Indonesia) 1962	Did not enter			
(Thailand) 1966	Did not enter			
(Thailand) 1970	Did not enter			
(Iran) 1974	9th place	4	2	2
(Thailand) 1978	9th place	9	5	4
(India) 1982	9th place	6	4	2
(South Korea) 1986	Did not enter			
(China) 1990	Did not enter			
(Japan) 1994	Did not enter			
(Thailand) 1998	Did not enter			
(South Korea) 2002	Did not enter			
(Qatar) 2006	Did not enter			
(China) 2010	Did not enter			
(South Korea) 2014	Did not enter			
(Indonesia) 2018	Did not enter			
(China) 2022	Did not enter			
Total	3/19	19	11	8

=== West Asian Championship ===
WABA Championship
Year	Position	Pld	W	L
(Lebanon) 1999	5th place	4	-	-
(Lebanon) 2000	3rd place	4	2	2
(Jordan) 2001	4th place	4	1	3
(Jordan) (Iran) 2002	3rd place	4	0	4
(Iran) 2004	5th place	4	-	-
(Lebanon) 2005	4th place	4	0	4
(Jordan) 2008	Did not enter	–	–	–
(Iraq) 2010	Runners-up	-	-	-
(Iraq) 2011	4th place	3	0	3
(Jordan) 2012	Did not enter	-	-	-
(Iran) 2013	4th place	3	0	3
(Jordan) 2014	4th place	5	2	3
(Jordan) 2015	5th place	4	0	4
(Jordan) 2016	3rd place	4	2	2
Total	12/14	-	-	-

=== Pan Arab Games ===
Pan Arab Games
Year	Position	Pld	W	L
(United Arab Republic) 1965	4th place	-	-	-
(Morocco) 1985	2nd place	-	-	-
(Egypt) 2007	4th place	5	2	3
(Qatar) 2011	8th place	6	3	3
Total	/	-	-	-

== Team ==
=== Current roster ===
Roster for the 2025 FIBA Asia Cup.

Iraq men's national basketball team – 2025 FIBA Asia Cup roster
Players
Coaches

Pos.	No.	Name	Age – Date of birth	Height	Club	Ctr.
C	0	Ihab Al-Zuhairi	27 – 24 April 1998	2.10 m (6 ft 11 in)	Air Defence SC	(Iraq)
SG	00	DeMario Mayfield (NP)	34 – 23 May 1991	1.90 m (6 ft 3 in)	Latina Basket	(Italy)
SG	1	Thulfiqar Hammoodi	32 – 6 August 1992	1.96 m (6 ft 5 in)	Air Defence SC	(Iraq)
PG	2	Mohammed Almahdi Abbas	24 – 20 January 2001	1.80 m (5 ft 11 in)		(Iraq)
C	3	Abdulla Hayder Alibraheemi	21 – 11 August 2003	2.05 m (6 ft 9 in)	Dijlah University College	(Iraq)
SF	6	Ali Alaa Hussein Al-Musawi	19 – 6 April 2006	2.00 m (6 ft 7 in)	Al-Hilla	(Iraq)
SG	7	Hassan Abdullah	33 – 4 February 1992	1.88 m (6 ft 2 in)	Al-Shorta	(Iraq)
F	14	Mohammed Falih Nali	25 – 15 May 2000	1.80 m (5 ft 11 in)	Al-Naft	(Iraq)
C	15	Mohammed Al-Khafaji	34 – 9 July 1991	2.09 m (6 ft 10 in)	Al-Shorta	(Iraq)
PF	24	Ali Ismael (C)	35 – 13 August 1989	2.00 m (6 ft 7 in)	Air Defence SC	(Iraq)
G	31	Abbas Alqarnami	27 – 15 August 1997		Air Defence SC	(Iraq)
G	33	Diar Ahmed Abdul Allah	25 – 17 July 2000	1.85 m (6 ft 1 in)	Al-Naft	(Iraq)

Head coach

- (Serbia) Veselin Matić

Assistant coach(es)

- (Iraq) Aqeel Al-Jasim

Legend

- (C) Team captain
- (NP) Naturalized player
- Club – describes last
  club before the tournament
- Age – describes age
  on 5 August 2025

=== Past rosters ===
2021 FIBA Asia Cup qualification
Opposition: Lebanon (21 February)
Venue: Nouhad Nawfal Sports Complex, Zouk Mikael
Opposition: India (24 February)
Venue: Al Shaab Hall, Baghdad

Iraq national basketball team – 2021 FIBA Asia Cup qualification roster
Players
Coaches

Pos.	No.	Name	Age – Date of birth	Height	Club	Ctr.
C	0	Ihab Al-Zuhairi	21 – April 24, 1998	2.10 m (6 ft 11 in)	Naft Baghdad	(Iraq)
PG	00	DeMario Mayfield (NP)	28 – May 23, 1991	1.93 m (6 ft 4 in)	Naft Baghdad	(United States)
PG	3	Sanar Shamdeen	24 – August 17, 1995	1.72 m (5 ft 8 in)	Zakho BC	(Iraq)
SG	7	Hassan Abdullah	28 – February 4, 1992	1.88 m (6 ft 2 in)	Al-Shorta BC	(Iraq)
SF	10	Ali Hamad	33 – May 27, 1986	1.93 m (6 ft 4 in)	Naft Baghdad	(Iraq)
G	12	Hussein Talib	29 – June 1, 1990	1.98 m (6 ft 6 in)	Al-Shorta BC	(Iraq)
C	13	Ali Hameed	35 – April 26, 1984	2.09 m (6 ft 10 in)	Duhok BC	(Iraq)
C	15	Mohammed Al-Khafaji	28 – July 9, 1991	2.09 m (6 ft 10 in)	Al-Shorta BC	(Iraq)
F	21	Dhulfiqar Al-Hchaimi	28 – May 24, 1991	1.93 m (6 ft 4 in)	Naft Al-Janoob BC	(Iraq)
PF	24	Ali Ismael	30 – August 13, 1989	2.00 m (6 ft 7 in)	Naft Baghdad	(Iraq)
SG	25	Karrar Hamzah	28 – October 19, 1991	1.88 m (6 ft 2 in)	Naft Baghdad	(Iraq)
PG	44	Mohammed Amin Abdulqader	25 – January 31, 1995	1.83 m (6 ft 0 in)	Duhok BC	(Iraq)

Head coach

- (Iraq) Khalid Deroish

Legend

- (C) Team captain
- (NP) Naturalized player
- Club – describes last
  club before the tournament
- Age – describes age
  on 21 February 2020

Roster for the 2017 FIBA Asia Cup.

Iraq men's national basketball team – 2017 FIBA Asia Cup roster
Players
Coaches

Pos.	No.	Name	Age – Date of birth	Height	Club	Ctr.
SG	4	Karrar Hamzah	25 – October 19, 1991	1.90 m (6 ft 3 in)	Al Kahraba	(Iraq)
PG	6	Ali Aljuboori	30 – April 9, 1987	1.75 m (5 ft 9 in)	Al-Mina'a	(Iraq)
SG	7	Hassan Abdullah	25 – February 4, 1992	1.90 m (6 ft 3 in)	Al Kahraba	(Iraq)
PG	8	Omar Alazawi	29 – May 12, 1988	1.88 m (6 ft 2 in)	Al Karkh	(Iraq)
G	9	Kevin Galloway (NP)	29 – May 23, 1988	2.00 m (6 ft 7 in)	Homenetmen Beirut	(Lebanon)
SF	10	Ali Hamad	31 – May 27, 1986	1.94 m (6 ft 4 in)	Al-Naft	(Iraq)
PF	11	Nawras Dhafer	23 – July 17, 1994	2.02 m (6 ft 8 in)	Al-Shorta BC	(Iraq)
PF	12	Hussein Talib	27 – June 1, 1990	1.98 m (6 ft 6 in)	Naft Al-Janoob	(Iraq)
C	13	Ali Hameed	33 – April 26, 1984	2.09 m (6 ft 10 in)	Al-Mina'a	(Iraq)
C	14	Hussein Hasan Algburi	32 – October 2, 1984	2.06 m (6 ft 9 in)	Free Agent
C	15	Mohammed Al-Khafaji	26 – July 9, 1991	2.06 m (6 ft 9 in)	Al-Shorta BC	(Iraq)
SF	24	Ali Ismael	27 – August 13, 1989	2.00 m (6 ft 7 in)	Al-Shorta BC	(Iraq)

Head coach

- (Turkey) Mustafa Derin

Assistant coach(es)

- (Iraq) Atilla Celebi

Legend

- (C) Team captain
- (NP) Naturalized player
- Club – describes last
  club before the tournament
- Age – describes age
  on 8 August 2017

=== Head coach position ===
- (Iraq) Fikrat Toma – 2002–2004, 2010–2013
- (Spain) Manuel Povea – 2014–2015
- (Serbia) Srđan Antić – 2016
- (Iraq) Atila Abdulaziz – 2017
- (Turkey) Mustafa Derin – 2017
- (Iraq) Khalid Deroish – 2020
- (Bosnia and Herzegovina) / (Turkey) Aziz Bekir – 2020

== See also ==
- Iraq women's national basketball team
- Iraq national under-19 basketball team
- Iraq national under-17 basketball team
