= 2003 ABC Championship qualification =

The 2003 ABC Championship qualification was held in late 2002 and early 2003 with the Gulf region, West Asia, Southeast Asia, East Asia and Middle Asia (Central Asia and South Asia) each conducting tournaments.

== Qualification format ==
The following are eligible to participate:

- The organizing country.
- The five best-placed teams from the previous ABC Championship.
- The two best teams from the sub-zones.

== 2001 ABC Championship ==
Rank	Team
1st place, gold medalist(s)	China
2nd place, silver medalist(s)	Lebanon
3rd place, bronze medalist(s)	South Korea
4	Syria
5	Qatar
6	Japan
7	Chinese Taipei
8	India
9	Uzbekistan
10	United Arab Emirates
11	Hong Kong
12	Kuwait
13	Thailand
14	Singapore

== Qualified teams ==
East Asia (3+2)	Gulf (1+2)	Middle Asia (2)	Southeast Asia (2)	West Asia (2+2)
China	Qatar	Uzbekistan	Philippines	Lebanon
South Korea	~~United Arab Emirates~~ *	India	Malaysia	Syria
Japan	~~Saudi Arabia~~ *			Jordan
Chinese Taipei				Iran
Hong Kong				

* Withdrew, Kazakhstan and Kuwait were given a wild card entry into the championship.

== East Asia ==
All the others withdrew, so Chinese Taipei and Hong Kong qualified automatically.

== Gulf ==
The 2002 Gulf Basketball Association Championship is the qualifying tournament for the 2003 ABC Championship. the two best teams excluding Qatar qualifies for 2003 ABC Championship. The tournament was held at Dubai, United Arab Emirates.

=== Preliminary round ===
Team	Pld	W	L	PF	PA	PD	Pts	Tiebreaker
Qatar	4	3	1	293	251	+42	7	1–0
United Arab Emirates	4	3	1	291	268	+23	7	0–1
Saudi Arabia	4	2	2	325	325	0	6	1–0
Bahrain	4	2	2	313	335	−22	6	0–1
Kuwait	4	0	4	298	341	−43	4	

September 12

United Arab Emirates	77–63	Kuwait

Al-Ahli Indoor Hall, Dubai

September 12

Bahrain	69–94	Saudi Arabia

Al-Ahli Indoor Hall, Dubai

September 13

Qatar	77–83	Bahrain

Al-Ahli Indoor Hall, Dubai

September 13

Saudi Arabia	70–88	United Arab Emirates

Al-Ahli Indoor Hall, Dubai

September 14

United Arab Emirates	77–70	Bahrain

Al-Ahli Indoor Hall, Dubai

September 14

Kuwait	54–77	Qatar

Al-Ahli Indoor Hall, Dubai

September 16

Saudi Arabia	65–74	Qatar

Al-Ahli Indoor Hall, Dubai

September 16

Bahrain	91–87	Kuwait

Al-Ahli Indoor Hall, Dubai

September 17

Kuwait	94–96	Saudi Arabia

Al-Ahli Indoor Hall, Dubai

September 17

Qatar	65–49	United Arab Emirates

Al-Ahli Indoor Hall, Dubai

=== Final ===
September 18

Qatar	58–69	United Arab Emirates

Al-Ahli Indoor Hall, Dubai

=== Final standing ===
Rank	Team
1st place, gold medalist(s)	United Arab Emirates
2nd place, silver medalist(s)	Qatar
3rd place, bronze medalist(s)	Saudi Arabia
4	Bahrain
5	Kuwait

== Middle Asia ==
The 2003 Middle Asia Basketball Championship is the qualifying tournament for the 2003 ABC Championship. the two best teams qualifies for 2003 ABC Championship. The tournament was held at New Delhi, India.

Team	Pld	W	L	PF	PA	PD	Pts
Uzbekistan	4	4	0	429	185	+248	8
India	4	3	1	420	242	+178	7
Bangladesh	4	2	2	211	335	−124	6
Sri Lanka	4	1	3	247	372	−125	5
Nepal	4	0	4	224	401	−177	4

July 9

Bangladesh	53–109	India

Talkatora Stadium, New Delhi

July 9

Nepal	42–111	Uzbekistan

Talkatora Stadium, New Delhi

July 10

Sri Lanka	92–76	Nepal

Talkatora Stadium, New Delhi

July 10

Uzbekistan	106–22	Bangladesh

Talkatora Stadium, New Delhi

July 10

India	132–46	Nepal

Talkatora Stadium, New Delhi

July 10

Sri Lanka	39–125	Uzbekistan

Talkatora Stadium, New Delhi

July 11

India	101–56	Sri Lanka

Talkatora Stadium, New Delhi

July 11

Nepal	60–66	Bangladesh

Talkatora Stadium, New Delhi

July 12

Bangladesh	70–60	Sri Lanka

Talkatora Stadium, New Delhi

July 12

Uzbekistan	87–78	India

Talkatora Stadium, New Delhi

== Southeast Asia ==
2003 SEABA Championship
5th Southeast Asian Basketball Championship

Tournament details
- Host country: Malaysia
- Dates: 19–21 August
- Teams: 4
- Venue(s): 1 (in 1 host city)

Final positions
- Champions: Philippines (3rd title)

The 5th Southeast Asia Basketball Association Championship is the qualifying tournament for the 2003 ABC Championship. the two best teams qualifies for 2003 ABC Championship. The tournament was held at Kuala Lumpur, Malaysia.

=== Round Robin ===
Team	Pld	W	L	PF	PA	PD	Pts
Philippines	3	3	0	278	185	+93	6
Malaysia	3	2	1	250	232	+18	5
Thailand	3	1	2	203	234	−31	4
Vietnam	3	0	3	195	275	−80	3

August 19

Thailand	56–83	Philippines

MABA Stadium, Kuala Lumpur

August 19

Vietnam	70–95	Malaysia

MABA Stadium, Kuala Lumpur

August 20

Philippines	99–48	Vietnam

MABA Stadium, Kuala Lumpur

August 20

Malaysia	74–66	Thailand

MABA Stadium, Kuala Lumpur

August 21

Vietnam	77–81	Thailand

MABA Stadium, Kuala Lumpur

August 21

Philippines	96–81	Malaysia

MABA Stadium, Kuala Lumpur

== West Asia ==
The 2002/2003 West Asia Basketball Association Championship is the qualifying tournament for the 2003 ABC Championship. the two best teams qualifies for 2003 ABC Championship. The tournament supposed to be held in 3 stages in Jordan, Iran and Iraq in late 2002 and early 2003 but the last round was cancelled.

Team	Pld	W	L	PF	PA	PD	Pts	Tiebreaker
Jordan	4	3	1	327	285	+42	7	1–1 / 1.088
Iran	4	3	1	295	292	+3	7	1–1 / 0.919
Iraq	4	0	4	268	313	−45	4	

July 17

Jordan	84–79	Iraq

Prince Hamzah Court, Amman

July 18

Iran	74–63	Iraq

Prince Hamzah Court, Amman

July 19

Jordan	68–72	Iran

Prince Hamzah Court, Amman

September 18

Iran	73–68	Iraq

Azadi Basketball Hall, Tehran

September 19

Iraq	58–82	Jordan

Azadi Basketball Hall, Tehran

September 20

Iran	76–93	Jordan

Azadi Basketball Hall, Tehran
