= 2015 FIBA Asia Championship qualification =

Qualification for the 2015 FIBA Asia Championship was held to determine the participants in the 2015 FIBA Asia Championship. China secured qualification by being named as hosts. The other fifteen berths were disputed per FIBA Asia zone, and via the 2014 FIBA Asia Cup.

== Qualification format ==
The following are eligible to participate:

- The organizing country.
- The champion team from the previous FIBA Asia Cup.
- The four best-placed teams from the previous FIBA Asia Cup will qualify the same number of teams from their respective sub-zones.
- The two best teams from the sub-zones of East Asia, Gulf, Southeast Asia and West Asia and the winner from the sub-zones of South Asia and Central Asia.

Berths
Zone	Automatic	Additional berths from FIBA Asia Cup	Total
FIBA Asia Cup champion	1	—N/a	1
Host team	1	—N/a	1
Central Asia	1	0	1
East Asia	2	2	4
Gulf	2	0	3
South Asia	1	0	1
Southeast Asia	2	1	3
West Asia	2	1	3
Total	12	4	16

== Qualified teams ==
Team	Qualified as	Date	Last appearance	Total appearances
Iran	2014 FIBA Asia Cup champions	19 July 2014	2013	16
China	Tournament hosts	24 July 2014	2013	21
Qatar	2014 Gulf champions	19 October 2014	2013	9
Kuwait	2014 Gulf runners-up	20 October 2014	2009	12
Kazakhstan	2015 Central Asian champions	27 April 2015	2013	8
Philippines	2015 Southeast Asian champions	29 April 2015	2013	25
Singapore	2015 Southeast Asian third place	29 April 2015	2001	16
Malaysia	2015 Southeast Asian runners-up	30 April 2015	2013	24
Lebanon	2015 West Asian champions	31 May 2015	2011	7
South Korea	2015 East Asian 1st ranked	1 June 2015	2013	27
Chinese Taipei	2015 East Asian 2nd ranked	1 June 2015	2013	22
Japan	2015 East Asian 3rd ranked	1 June 2015	2013	26
Hong Kong	2015 East Asian 4th ranked	1 June 2015	2013	25
Jordan	2015 West Asian runners-up	2 June 2015	2013	13
Palestine	2015 West Asian third place	2 June 2015	Debut	1
India	2015 South Asian champions	5 July 2015	2013	24

== FIBA Asia Cup ==
The 2014 FIBA Asia Cup was held at Wuhan, Hubei, China from 11 to 19 July 2014.

Rank	Team	Note
1st place, gold medalist(s)	Iran	Qualified
2nd place, silver medalist(s)	Chinese Taipei	East Asia (+1)
3rd place, bronze medalist(s)	Philippines	Southeast Asia (+1)
4	China	Direct qualifier
5	Jordan	West Asia (+1)
6	Japan	East Asia (+2)
7	India	
8	Singapore	
9	Indonesia	

- The host nation was not yet determined at the conclusion of the tournament. China was chosen as the hosts a week later.

== Central Asia ==
The Central Asia qualifiers was a one-game playoff between Kazakhstan and Kyrgyzstan in Astana.

27 April 2015

Kazakhstan	84–39	Kyrgyzstan

Astana

== East Asia ==
The 4th East Asian Basketball Championship was cancelled as no countries were willing to host it. The four countries with the highest FIBA rankings (excluding finals hosts China) took the 4 finals berths available to East Asian teams: South Korea, Chinese Taipei, Japan, and Hong Kong.

The participation of Japan was dependent if FIBA lifts its suspension in time for the draw.

== Gulf ==
The 14th Gulf Basketball Championship was held at Dammam, Saudi Arabia from 13 to 20 October 2014.

Pos	Team	Pld	W	L	PF	PA	PD	Pts	Qualification
1	Qatar	5	5	0	381	284	+97	10	Qualification to 2015 FIBA Asia Championship
2	Kuwait	5	4	1	344	323	+21	9	Qualification to 2015 FIBA Asia Championship
3	Bahrain	5	3	2	398	355	+43	8	
4	Saudi Arabia (H)	5	2	3	378	348	+30	7	
5	United Arab Emirates	5	1	4	345	384	−39	6	
6	Oman	5	0	5	265	417	−152	5	

(H) Hosts

14 October 2014

Oman	35–86	Bahrain

Dammam Sports City, Dammam

14 October 2014

Saudi Arabia	76–64	United Arab Emirates

Dammam Sports City, Dammam

14 October 2014

Kuwait	53–78	Qatar

Dammam Sports City, Dammam

15 October 2014

United Arab Emirates	75–81	Kuwait

Dammam Sports City, Dammam

15 October 2014

Qatar	75–49	Oman

Dammam Sports City, Dammam

15 October 2014

Bahrain	101–92	Saudi Arabia

Dammam Sports City, Dammam

17 October 2014

United Arab Emirates	53–71	Qatar

Dammam Sports City, Dammam

17 October 2014

Kuwait	72–65	Bahrain

Dammam Sports City, Dammam

17 October 2014

Saudi Arabia	95–53	Oman

Dammam Sports City, Dammam

18 October 2014

Oman	55–79	Kuwait

Dammam Sports City, Dammam

19 October 2014

Qatar	71–66	Saudi Arabia

Dammam Sports City, Dammam

19 October 2014

Bahrain	83–71	United Arab Emirates

Dammam Sports City, Dammam

20 October 2014

United Arab Emirates	82–73	Oman

Dammam Sports City, Dammam

20 October 2014

Qatar	86–63	Bahrain

Dammam Sports City, Dammam

20 October 2014

Saudi Arabia	50–59	Kuwait

Dammam Sports City, Dammam

== South Asia ==
The 4th SABA Championship was held at Bengaluru, India from 3 to 5 July 2015.

Pos	Team	Pld	W	L	PF	PA	PD	Pts	Qualification
1	India (H)	5	5	0	552	220	+332	10	Qualification to 2015 FIBA Asia Championship
2	Sri Lanka	5	4	1	392	347	+45	9	
3	Nepal	5	2	3	332	370	−38	7	
4	Bangladesh	5	2	3	334	424	−90	7	
5	Maldives	5	2	3	348	419	−71	7	
6	Bhutan	5	0	5	292	470	−178	5	

Rules for classification: (1) Tournament points, (2) Head-to-head tournament points, (3) Head-to-head goal average, (4) Overall goal average, (5) Drawing of lots
(H) Hosts

== Southeast Asia ==
The 11th SEABA Championship was held at Singapore from 27 April to 1 May 2015.

Pos	Team	Pld	W	L	PF	PA	PD	Pts	Qualification
1	Philippines	5	5	0	542	200	+342	10	Qualification to 2015 FIBA Asia Championship
2	Malaysia	5	4	1	325	285	+40	9	Qualification to 2015 FIBA Asia Championship
3	Singapore (H)	5	3	2	368	228	+140	8	Qualification to 2015 FIBA Asia Championship
4	Indonesia	5	2	3	277	303	−26	7	
5	Laos	5	1	4	232	467	−235	6	
6	Brunei	5	0	5	190	451	−261	5	

Source: SEABA
Rules for classification: (1) Tournament points, (2) Head-to-head tournament points, (3) Head-to-head goal average, (4) Overall goal average, (5) Drawing of lots
(H) Hosts

== West Asia ==
The WABA Championship was held at Orthodox Club Arena, Amman from 29 May to 2 June 2015. As original hosts Iran were already qualified by winning the 2014 FIBA Asia Cup, they gave up hosting the tournament and withdrew. Lebanon, Jordan and Palestine qualified.

Pos	Team	Pld	W	L	PF	PA	PD	Pts	Qualification
1	Lebanon	4	4	0	341	279	+62	8	Qualification to 2015 FIBA Asia Championship
2	Jordan (H)	4	3	1	332	308	+24	7	Qualification to 2015 FIBA Asia Championship
3	Palestine	4	2	2	304	315	−11	6	Qualification to 2015 FIBA Asia Championship
4	Syria	4	1	3	276	306	−30	5	
5	Iraq	4	0	4	271	316	−45	4	

(H) Hosts

29 May 2015

Lebanon	85–67	Iraq

Orthodox Club Arena, Amman

29 May 2015

Palestine	76–92	Jordan

Orthodox Club Arena, Amman

30 May 2015

Syria	73–79	Palestine

Orthodox Club Arena, Amman

30 May 2015

Jordan	74–92	Lebanon

Orthodox Club Arena, Amman

31 May 2015

Lebanon	76–59	Syria

Orthodox Club Arena, Amman

31 May 2015

Iraq	71–86	Jordan

Orthodox Club Arena, Amman

1 June 2015

Palestine	79–88	Lebanon

Orthodox Club Arena, Amman

1 June 2015

Syria	75–71	Iraq

Orthodox Club Arena, Amman

2 June 2015

Iraq	62–70	Palestine

Orthodox Club Arena, Amman

2 June 2015

Jordan	80–69	Syria

Orthodox Club Arena, Amman
