= Oman men's national basketball team =

Oman
- FIBA ranking: 141 ▲5 (13 July 2026)
- Joined FIBA: 1987; 39 years ago
- FIBA zone: FIBA Asia
- National federation: OBA
- Coach: Mohammed Al-Owaisi
- Nickname: Al-Ahmar (The Reds)

Olympic Games
- Appearances: None

FIBA World Cup
- Appearances: None

FIBA Asia Cup
- Appearances: None
Home	Away

The Oman national basketball team represents Oman in international men's basketball and is regulated by the Oman Basketball Association (OBA), the governing body for basketball in the country.

== Competitive record ==
=== FIBA Asia Cup ===
Year	Position	Pld	W	L
(Philippines) 1960	Not a FIBA member			
(Taiwan) 1963	Not a FIBA member			
(Malaysia) 1965	Not a FIBA member			
(South Korea) 1967	Not a FIBA member			
(Thailand) 1969	Not a FIBA member			
(Japan) 1971	Not a FIBA member			
(Philippines) 1973	Not a FIBA member			
(Thailand) 1975	Not a FIBA member			
(Malaysia) 1977	Not a FIBA member			
(Japan) 1979	Not a FIBA member			
(India) 1981	Not a FIBA member			
(Hong Kong) 1983	Not a FIBA member			
(Malaysia) 1985	Not a FIBA member			
(Thailand) 1987	Not a FIBA member			
(China) 1989	Did not enter			
(Japan) 1991	Did not enter			
(Indonesia) 1993	Did not enter			
(South Korea) 1995	Did not enter			
(Saudi Arabia) 1997	Did not enter			
(Japan) 1999	Did not enter			
(China) 2001	Did not enter			
(China) 2003	Did not enter			
(Qatar) 2005	Did not qualify			
(Japan) 2007	Did not qualify			
(China) 2009	Did not qualify			
(China) 2011	Did not enter			
(Philippines) 2013	Did not qualify			
(China) 2015	Did not qualify			
(Lebanon) 2017	Did not qualify			
(Indonesia) 2022	Did not qualify			
(Saudi Arabia) 2025	Did not qualify			
2029	Did not qualify			
Total	0/32	0	0	0
