= 2013 FIBA Asia Championship qualification =

Qualification for a championship

The qualification for the 2013 FIBA Asia Championship was held in late 2012 from early 2013 with the Gulf region, West Asia, Southeast Asia, East Asia, Central Asia and South Asia each conducting tournaments.

== Qualification format ==
The following are eligible to participate:

- The organizing country.
- The champion team from the previous FIBA Asia Cup.
- The four best-placed teams from the previous FIBA Asia Cup will qualify the same number of teams from their respective sub-zones.
- The two best teams from the sub-zones of East Asia, Gulf, Southeast Asia and West Asia and the winner from the sub-zones of South Asia and Central Asia.

Berths

Zone	Automatic	Additional berths from FIBA Asia Cup	Total
FIBA Asia Cup champion	1	—N/a	1
Host team	1	—N/a	1
Central Asia	1	0	1
East Asia	2	3	5
Gulf	2	1	3
South Asia	1	0	1
Southeast Asia	2	0	2
West Asia	2	0	3

== FIBA Asia Cup ==
Rank	Team	Note
1st place, gold medalist(s)	Iran	Direct Qualifier
2nd place, silver medalist(s)	Japan	East Asia (+1)
3rd place, bronze medalist(s)	Qatar	Gulf (+1)
4	Philippines	Hosts
5	China	East Asia (+2)
6	Chinese Taipei	East Asia (+3)
7	Lebanon	
8	Uzbekistan	
9	India	
9	Macau	

== Qualified teams ==
Host and 2012 FIBA Asia Cup champion
Automatic berth
Additional berth from 2012 FIBA Asia Cup

Central Asia (1)	East Asia (2+3)	Gulf (2+1)	South Asia (1)	Southeast Asia (1+2)	West Asia (1+2)
Kazakhstan	South Korea	Qatar	India	Philippines	Iran
	China	Bahrain		Thailand	~~Lebanon~~
	Japan	Saudi Arabia		Malaysia	Jordan
	Hong Kong				
	Chinese Taipei				

- Lebanon originally qualified for the tournament but was suspended by FIBA due to unresolved issues in its basketball federation. Iraq and the United Arab Emirates were asked to take Lebanon's slot in the tournament. However, they both begged off due to lack of preparation.

== Central Asia ==
The qualification for Central Asia consisted of a single game. On May 7, 2013, in Astana, Kazakhstan beat Uzbekistan 80–60 and was qualified for the 2013 FIBA Asia Championship.

Team	Pld	W	L	PF	PA	PD	Pts
Kazakhstan	1	1	0	80	60	+20	2
Uzbekistan	1	0	1	60	80	−20	1

May 7
17:00

Kazakhstan	80–60	Uzbekistan
Scoring by quarter: 21–15, 19–18, 22–14, 18–13

Republican Cycling Track, Astana

== East Asia ==
The 3rd East Asian Basketball Association Championship for Men is the qualifying tournament for the 2013 FIBA Asia Championship. It also serves as a regional championship involving East Asian basketball teams. the five best teams qualifies for 2013 FIBA Asia Championship. The tournament was held from May 16 to 21, 2013 in Incheon, South Korea.

=== Preliminary round ===
==== Group A ====
Team	Pld	W	L	PF	PA	PD	Pts
South Korea	3	3	0	276	150	+126	6
Japan	3	2	1	227	197	+30	5
Chinese Taipei	3	1	2	234	181	+53	4
Macau	3	0	3	124	333	−209	3

May 16
14:00

Chinese Taipei	108–32	Macau
Scoring by quarter: 28–9, 24–4, 24–9, 32–10

Samsan World Gymnasium, Incheon

May 16
16:00

Japan	55–74	South Korea
Scoring by quarter: 15–24, 4–16, 15–21, 21–13

Samsan World Gymnasium, Incheon

May 17
14:00

South Korea	78–56	Chinese Taipei
Scoring by quarter: 15–21, 22–10, 19–14, 22–11

Samsan World Gymnasium, Incheon

May 17
16:00

Macau	53–101	Japan
Scoring by quarter: 13–25, 14–28, 14–23, 12–25

Samsan World Gymnasium, Incheon

May 18
14:00

Japan	71–70	Chinese Taipei
Scoring by quarter: 17–17, 15–18, 22–15, 17–20

Samsan World Gymnasium, Incheon

May 18
16:00

South Korea	124–39	Macau
Scoring by quarter: 34–1, 36–11, 27–12, 27–15

Samsan World Gymnasium, Incheon

==== Group B ====
Team	Pld	W	L	PF	PA	PD	Pts
China	2	2	0	193	104	+89	4
Hong Kong	2	1	1	135	157	−22	3
Mongolia	2	0	2	118	185	−67	2

May 16
18:00

China	84–59	Hong Kong
Scoring by quarter: 15–9, 16–25, 26–15, 27–10

Samsan World Gymnasium, Incheon

May 17
18:00

Hong Kong	76–73	Mongolia
Scoring by quarter: 19–16, 16–17, 24–19, 17–21

Samsan World Gymnasium, Incheon

May 18
18:00

Mongolia	45–109	China
Scoring by quarter: 17–26, 6–23, 9–30, 13–30

Samsan World Gymnasium, Incheon

=== Classification 5th–6th ===
May 20
14:00

Chinese Taipei	94–86	Mongolia
Scoring by quarter: 21–22, 28–16, 25–18, 20–30

Samsan World Gymnasium, Incheon

=== Final round ===
Semifinals
May 20
South Korea	105
Hong Kong	62
May 20
China	83
Japan	68

Final
May 21
South Korea	79
China	68
3rd place
May 21
Hong Kong	71
Japan	87

==== Semifinals ====
May 20
16:00

South Korea	105–62	Hong Kong
Scoring by quarter: 32–9, 24–15, 22–21, 27–17

Samsan World Gymnasium, Incheon

May 20
18:00

China	83–68	Japan
Scoring by quarter: 15–15, 25–9, 13–16, 30–28

Samsan World Gymnasium, Incheon

==== 3rd place ====
May 21
14:00

Hong Kong	71–87	Japan
Scoring by quarter: 18–19, 16–22, 19–22, 18–24

Samsan World Gymnasium, Incheon

==== Final ====
May 21
16:00

South Korea	79–68	China
Scoring by quarter: 19–13, 24–23, 17–20, 19–12

Samsan World Gymnasium, Incheon

=== Final standing ===
Rank	Team
1st place, gold medalist(s)	South Korea
2nd place, silver medalist(s)	China
3rd place, bronze medalist(s)	Japan
4	Hong Kong
5	Chinese Taipei
6	Mongolia
7	Macau

== Gulf ==
The 13th Gulf Basketball Championship is the qualifying tournament for the 2013 FIBA Asia Championship. it also serves as a regional championship. the three best teams qualifies for FIBA Asia Championship 2013.

Team	Pld	W	L	PF	PA	PD	Pts
Qatar	4	4	0	318	226	+92	8
Bahrain	4	3	1	307	248	+59	7
Saudi Arabia	4	2	2	261	247	+14	6
United Arab Emirates	4	1	3	291	300	−9	5
Oman	4	0	4	189	345	−156	4

September 30
16:00

United Arab Emirates	95–59	Oman
Scoring by quarter: 34–8, 18–17, 22–17, 21–17

Zain Court, Manama

September 30
19:00

Bahrain	67–64	Saudi Arabia
Scoring by quarter: 14–25, 15–16, 16–18, 22–5

Zain Court, Manama

October 1
17:00

Qatar	66–60	Saudi Arabia
Scoring by quarter: 22–17, 21–14, 14–19, 9–10

Zain Court, Manama

October 1
19:00

United Arab Emirates	74–93	Bahrain
Scoring by quarter: 16–25, 18–28, 19–21, 21–19

Zain Court, Manama

October 3
17:00

Oman	36–83	Bahrain
Scoring by quarter: 6–28, 6–14, 11–15, 13–26

Zain Court, Manama

October 3
19:00

Qatar	81–62	United Arab Emirates
Scoring by quarter: 21–17, 21–14, 16–16, 23–15

Zain Court, Manama

October 4
17:00

Saudi Arabia	67–60	United Arab Emirates
Scoring by quarter: 27–13, 3–18, 18–13, 19–16

Zain Court, Manama

October 4
19:00

Oman	40–97	Qatar
Scoring by quarter: 7–25, 14–35, 8–27, 11–10

Zain Court, Manama

October 6
17:00

Saudi Arabia	70–54	Oman

Zain Court, Manama

October 6
19:00

Bahrain	64–74	Qatar
Scoring by quarter: 15–20, 16–18, 16–18, 17–18

Zain Court, Manama

== South Asia ==
The 2013 South Asian Basketball Association Qualifying Round for the 27th FIBA Asia Championship is the qualifying tournament for the 2013 FIBA Asia Championship. The winner qualifies for 2013 FIBA Asia Championship. The tournament will be held from June 2 to 4, 2013 in New Delhi, India.

Team	Pld	W	L	PF	PA	PD	Pts
India	2	2	0	173	72	+101	4
Afghanistan	2	1	1	124	84	+40	3
Nepal	2	0	2	46	187	–141	2

June 2
16:00

India	109–26	Nepal
Scoring by quarter: 24–8, 37–4, 27–10, 21–4

Thyagaraj Stadium, New Delhi

June 3
18:00

Nepal	20–78	Afghanistan
Scoring by quarter: 11–20, 0–16, 5–24, 4–18

Thyagaraj Stadium, New Delhi

June 4
18:00

Afghanistan	46–64	India
Scoring by quarter: 9–19, 9–15, 11–13, 17–17

Thyagaraj Stadium, New Delhi

== Southeast Asia ==
The 10th Southeast Asia Basketball Association Championship is the qualifying tournament for the 2013 FIBA Asia Championship; it also serves as a regional championship involving Southeast Asian basketball teams. It will be held on June 20 to June 23, 2013 at Medan, Indonesia. The two best teams will qualify for the 2013 FIBA Asia Championship.

=== Preliminary round ===
Team	Pld	W	L	PF	PA	PD	Pts	Tiebreaker
Thailand	3	2	1	218	185	+33	5	1–0
Malaysia	3	2	1	178	185	−7	5	0–1
Singapore	3	1	2	181	195	−14	4	1–0
Indonesia	3	1	2	217	229	−12	4	0–1

June 20
17:00

Singapore	49–67	Thailand
Scoring by quarter: 16–17, 7–14, 17–22, 9–14

GOR Samudra, Medan

June 20
19:00

Indonesia	64–67	Malaysia
Scoring by quarter: 23–21, 12–15, 16–20, 13–11

GOR Samudra, Medan

June 21
18:00

Malaysia	64–58	Singapore
Scoring by quarter: 22–19, 12–13, 15–10, 15–16

GOR Samudra, Medan

June 21
20:00

Thailand	88–89 (OT)	Indonesia
Scoring by quarter: 18–22, 17–16, 17–20, 27–21, Overtime: 9–10

GOR Samudra, Medan

June 22
18:00

Malaysia	47–63	Thailand
Scoring by quarter: 10–18, 8–24, 18–13, 11–8

GOR Samudra, Medan

June 22
20:00

Indonesia	64–74	Singapore
Scoring by quarter: 21–24, 13–27, 20–8, 10–15

GOR Samudra, Medan

=== Final ===
June 23
20:00

Thailand	73–63	Malaysia
Scoring by quarter: 18–24, 17–10, 22–17, 16–12

GOR Samudra, Medan

=== Final standing ===
Rank	Team
1st place, gold medalist(s)	Thailand
2nd place, silver medalist(s)	Malaysia
3rd place, bronze medalist(s)	Singapore
4	Indonesia

== West Asia ==
The 2013 West Asian Basketball Championship is the qualifying tournament for the 2013 FIBA Asia Championship. It also serves as a regional championship involving West Asian basketball teams. the two best teams excluding Iran qualifies for 2013 FIBA Asia Championship. The tournament was held from February 7 to February 9, 2013 in Tehran, Iran.

Team	Pld	W	L	PF	PA	PD	Pts
Iran	3	3	0	287	202	+85	6
Lebanon	3	2	1	290	261	+29	5
Jordan	3	1	2	230	271	−41	4
Iraq	3	0	3	213	286	−73	3

February 7
15:00

Lebanon	106–72	Iraq
Scoring by quarter: 23–12, 31–15, 30–13, 22–32

Azadi Basketball Hall, Tehran

February 7
17:00

Iran	93–55	Jordan
Scoring by quarter: 26–10, 20–20, 25–9, 22–16

Azadi Basketball Hall, Tehran

February 8
15:00

Iran	94–61	Iraq
Scoring by quarter: 31–15, 24–17, 21–17, 18–12

Azadi Basketball Hall, Tehran

February 8
17:00

Lebanon	98–89	Jordan
Scoring by quarter: 16–16, 19–21, 29–24, 34–28

Azadi Basketball Hall, Tehran

February 9
15:00

Jordan	86–80	Iraq
Scoring by quarter: 20–15, 20–27, 15–12, 31–26

Azadi Basketball Hall, Tehran

February 9
17:00

Iran	100–86 (OT)	Lebanon
Scoring by quarter: 23–19, 22–14, 19–24, 16–23, Overtime: 20–6

Azadi Basketball Hall, Tehran
