= Magd Harbasha =

Syrian basketball player

No. 8 – Al Wahda Damascus
- Position: Shooting guard
- League: Syrian Basketball League

Personal information
- Born: April 21, 1990 (age 36) Damascus, Syria
- Listed height: 6 ft 2 in (1.88 m)

Career information
- Playing career: 2010–present

Career history
- 2010–present: Al Wahda Damascus

Majd Arbasha (born April 21, 1990) is a Syrian professional basketball player. He currently plays for Al Wahda Damascus of the Syrian Basketball League.

He has been a member of Syria's national basketball team. At the 2017 WABA Championship in Amman, Jordan, he recorded most minutes and steals for Syria.
