= 2001 ABC Championship qualification =

The 2001 ABC Championship qualification was held in late 2000 and early 2001 with the Gulf region, West Asia, Southeast Asia, East Asia and Middle Asia (Central Asia and South Asia) each conducting tournaments.

== Qualification format ==
The following are eligible to participate:

- The organizing country.
- The five best-placed teams from the previous ABC Championship.
- The two best teams from the sub-zones.

== 1999 ABC Championship ==
Rank	Team
1st place, gold medalist(s)	China
2nd place, silver medalist(s)	South Korea
3rd place, bronze medalist(s)	Saudi Arabia
4	Chinese Taipei
5	Japan
6	Kuwait
7	Lebanon
8	Syria
9	Uzbekistan
10	United Arab Emirates
11	Philippines
12	Bahrain
13	Hong Kong
14	Thailand
15	Malaysia

== Qualified teams ==
East Asia (4+2)	Gulf (2+2)	Middle Asia (2)	Southeast Asia (2)	West Asia (2)
China	~~Saudi Arabia~~ *	India	~~Philippines~~ **	Lebanon
South Korea	Kuwait	Uzbekistan	Thailand	Syria
Chinese Taipei	Qatar			
Japan	United Arab Emirates			
~~North Korea~~ *				
Hong Kong				

* Withdrew

** Suspended by FIBA, replaced by Singapore which finished third in the Southeast Asian qualifiers.

== East Asia ==
All the others withdrew, so North Korea and Hong Kong qualified automatically.

== Gulf ==
The 2000 Gulf Basketball Association Championship is the qualifying tournament for the 2001 ABC Championship. Qatar won the tournament and qualified alongside United Arab Emirates.

== Middle Asia ==
All the others withdrew, so India and Uzbekistan qualified automatically.

== Southeast Asia ==
2001 SEABA Championship
4th Southeast Asian Basketball Championship

Tournament details
- Host country: Philippines
- Dates: 2–7 April
- Teams: 7
- Venue(s): 1 (in 1 host city)

Final positions
- Champions: Philippines (2nd title)

The 4th Southeast Asia Basketball Association Championship is the qualifying tournament for the 2001 ABC Championship. the two best teams qualifies for 2001 ABC Championship. The tournament was held at Manila, Philippines.

=== Preliminary round ===
==== Group A ====
Team	Pld	W	L	PF	PA	PD	Pts
Philippines	3	3	0	333	159	+174	6
Singapore	3	2	1	240	229	+11	5
Malaysia	3	1	2	179	243	−64	4
Vietnam	3	0	3	180	301	−121	3

April 2
15:30

Report

Philippines	112–70	Singapore

Rizal Memorial Coliseum, Manila

April 2
17:30

Malaysia	81–72	Vietnam

Rizal Memorial Coliseum, Manila

April 3

Singapore	80–55	Malaysia

Rizal Memorial Coliseum, Manila

April 3

Vietnam	46–130	Philippines

Rizal Memorial Coliseum, Manila

April 4

Report

Philippines	91–43	Malaysia

Rizal Memorial Coliseum, Manila

April 5
13:30

Report

Singapore	90–62	Vietnam

Rizal Memorial Coliseum, Manila

==== Group B ====
Team	Pld	W	L	PF	PA	PD	Pts
Thailand	2	2	0	170	99	+71	4
Indonesia	2	1	1	164	111	+53	3
Brunei	2	0	2	79	203	−124	2

April 2
13:30

Thailand	101–37	Brunei

Rizal Memorial Coliseum, Manila

April 4

Brunei	42–102	Indonesia

Rizal Memorial Coliseum, Manila

April 5
15:30

Report

Indonesia	62–69	Thailand

Rizal Memorial Coliseum, Manila

=== Classification 5th–7th ===
Semifinals
April 6
Malaysia
Bye
April 6
Brunei	47
Vietnam	81

5th place
April 7
Malaysia	73
Vietnam	59

==== Semifinals ====
April 6

Brunei	47–81	Vietnam

Rizal Memorial Coliseum, Manila

==== 5th place ====
April 7

Malaysia	73–59	Vietnam

Rizal Memorial Coliseum, Manila

=== Final round ===
Semifinals
April 6
Philippines	88
Indonesia	44
April 6
Thailand	70
Singapore	60

Final
April 7
Philippines	90
Thailand	73
3rd place
April 7
Indonesia	78
Singapore (OT)	81

==== Semifinals ====
April 6
13:30

Thailand	70–60	Singapore

Rizal Memorial Coliseum, Manila

April 6
15:30

Philippines	88–44	Indonesia

Rizal Memorial Coliseum, Manila

==== 3rd place ====
April 7

Report

Indonesia	78–81 (OT)	Singapore

Rizal Memorial Coliseum, Manila

==== Final ====
April 7

Report

Philippines	90–73	Thailand

Rizal Memorial Coliseum, Manila

=== Final standing ===
Rank	Team
1st place, gold medalist(s)	Philippines
2nd place, silver medalist(s)	Thailand
3rd place, bronze medalist(s)	Singapore
4	Indonesia
5	Malaysia
6	Vietnam
7	Brunei

== West Asia ==
The 2000 West Asia Basketball Association Championship and 2001 West Asia Basketball Association Championship are the qualifying tournament for the 2001 ABC Championship. the two best teams after the second tournament qualifies for 2001 ABC Championship. The 2000 tournament was held at Beirut, Lebanon while Amman, Jordan hosted the 2001 edition.

Team	Pld	W	L	PF	PA	PD	Pts
Lebanon	8	7	1	704	649	+55	15
Syria	8	5	3	624	622	+2	13
Iran	8	4	4	635	624	+11	12
Iraq	8	3	5	630	637	−7	11
Jordan	8	1	7	572	633	−61	9

October 4, 2000

Iran	87–64	Jordan

Beirut

October 4, 2000

Lebanon	81–76	Iraq

Beirut

October 5, 2000

Syria	61–64	Iraq

Beirut

October 5, 2000

Lebanon	87–80	Iran

Beirut

October 6, 2000

Syria	88–78	Iran

Beirut

October 6, 2000

Lebanon	79–70	Jordan

Beirut

October 7, 2000

Iraq	64–66	Iran

Beirut

October 7, 2000

Jordan	72–75	Syria

Beirut

October 8, 2000

Iraq	78–57	Jordan

Beirut

October 8, 2000

Lebanon	93–80	Syria

Beirut

July 10, 2001

Iran	76–65	Jordan

Amman

July 10, 2001

Syria	80–78	Lebanon

Amman

July 11, 2001

Iran	77–87 (OT)	Syria

Amman

July 11, 2001

Iraq	89–88	Jordan

Amman

July 12, 2001

Iran	85–92	Lebanon

Amman

July 12, 2001

Syria	86–82	Iraq

Amman

July 13, 2001

Syria	67–78	Jordan

Amman

July 13, 2001

Lebanon	112–100	Iraq

Amman

July 14, 2001

Iran	86–77	Iraq

Amman

July 14, 2001

Lebanon	82–78	Jordan

Amman
