= Palestinian Basketball Federation =

Governing body of basketball in Palestine

- Abbreviation: PBF
- Formation: 1963; 63 years ago
- Location: Gaza, Palestine
- President: Imad Eldean Oqha
- Affiliations: FIBA; FIBA Asia; Palestine Olympic Committee

The Palestinian Basketball Federation (PBF) is the governing body of basketball in Palestine. The federation, founded in 1963, represents basketball with Palestine in international competitions. It is affiliated with FIBA and FIBA Asia. The federation also organizes the Palestine national basketball team and the Palestine women's national basketball team.
