= Oman Basketball Association =

- Abbreviation: OBA
- Formation: 1987; 39 years ago
- Location: Muscat, Oman
- President: Khalfan bin Saleh Al Naabi
- Vice president: Ali Salam Al-Yaaribi
- Affiliations: FIBA; FIBA Asia; Oman Olympic Committee

The Oman Basketball Association (Arabic: الاتحاد العماني لكرة السلة) is the governing body of basketball in Oman.

== History ==
Basketball started in Oman from Saidiya School in Muscat which was established in the year 1940, where the game was practiced by the school’s teachers and some students. Moreover, it was practiced by the military, visiting navy members, and the foreign doctors / medical staff of Al Saada American Hospital & Al Rahma Hospital in Matrah. Al Saidiya School teachers of Muscat & Matrah introduced the sport of basketball to Al Ahli Club in Matrah and Oman Club in Muscat through foreign students, as well as international and Arab expats living in Oman. The sport was spreading fast throughout the cities and provinces. Many games were played between the two schools and the two clubs, in addition to hosting games for visiting teams (civil, military, and expats) living in Oman. The official basketball competition featuring clubs goes back to 1984, with the start of the first ever national league.

In spring 2026 the OBA launched is Athletes Preparation Centres Basketball League on Friday and Saturday, which supports their efforts to build a strong and sustainable foundation for basketball in Oman.

== Administration ==
Ordinary General Assembly - gathering of federation's vice-chairman, board members, and presidents and representatives of affiliated clubs

== See also ==
- Oman Basketball League
