= Kuwait men's national basketball team =

Kuwait
- FIBA ranking: 110 ▲8 (1 September 2026)
- Joined FIBA: 1959
- FIBA zone: FIBA Asia
- National federation: KBA
- Coach: Vasileios Bratsiakos
- Nickname: Al-Azraq (The Blues)

Olympic Games
- Appearances: None

FIBA World Cup
- Appearances: None

FIBA Asia Cup
- Appearances: 12
- Medals: None
| Home | Away |

The Kuwait national basketball team represents Kuwait in international basketball and is controlled by the Kuwait Basketball Association (Arabic: جمعية الكويتي لكرة السلة); the governing body for basketball in the country.

The team has qualified for more major international basketball tournaments than any other nation on the Arabian Peninsula.

== Performance ==
=== Summer Olympics ===
yet to qualify

=== World championships ===
yet to qualify

=== FIBA Asia Cup ===
| Year | Position | Pld | W | L |
|---|---|---|---|---|
| (Philippines) 1960 | Did not enter | | | |
| (Taiwan) 1963 | Did not enter | | | |
| (Malaysia) 1965 | Did not enter | | | |
| (South Korea) 1967 | Did not enter | | | |
| (Thailand) 1969 | Did not enter | | | |
| (Japan) 1971 | Did not enter | | | |
| (Philippines) 1973 | Did not enter | | | |
| (Thailand) 1975 | 12th place | 9 | 2 | 7 |
| (Malaysia) 1977 | Did not enter | | | |
| (Japan) 1979 | Did not enter | | | |
| (India) 1981 | Did not enter | | | |
| (Hong Kong) 1983 | 4th place | 6 | 2 | 4 |
| (Malaysia) 1985 | Did not enter | | | |
| (Thailand) 1987 | Did not enter | | | |
| (China) 1989 | Did not enter | | | |
| (Japan) 1991 | 12th place | 8 | 3 | 5 |
| (Indonesia) 1993 | 10th place | 7 | 4 | 3 |
| (South Korea) 1995 | 11th place | 8 | 4 | 4 |
| (Saudi Arabia) 1997 | Did not enter | | | |
| (Japan) 1999 | 6th place | 7 | 3 | 4 |
| (China) 2001 | 12th place | 5 | 1 | 4 |
| (China) 2003 | 12th place | 7 | 3 | 4 |
| (Qatar) 2005 | 13th place | 7 | 3 | 4 |
| (Japan) 2007 | 14th place | 7 | 1 | 6 |
| (China) 2009 | 11th place | 8 | 2 | 6 |
| (China) 2011 | Did not enter | | | |
| (Philippines) 2013 | Did not enter | | | |
| (China) 2015 | 14th place | 5 | 1 | 4 |
| (Lebanon) 2017 | Did not enter | | | |
| (Indonesia) 2022 | Did not enter | | | |
| (Saudi Arabia) 2025 | Did not qualify | | | |
| 2029 | To be determined | | | |
| Total | 12/31 | 84 | 29 | 55 |

=== Asian Games ===
- 1951-70 : Did not qualify
- 1974 : 10th
- 1978 : 10th
- 1982 : 6th
- 1986 : 7th
- 1990-98 : Did not qualify
- 2002 : 10th
- 2006 : 17th
- 2010 : 13th
- 2014 : 9th
- 2018 : To be determined

=== Pan Arab Games ===
- 1953 : ?
- 1957 : ?
- 1961 : ?
- 1965 : ?
- 1976 : ?
- 1985 : ?
- 1992 : ?
- 1997 : ?
- 1999 : ?
- 2004 : ?
- 2007 : 5th
- 2011 : 6th

=== Islamic Solidarity Games ===
- 2005 : 12th
- 2013 : 4th
- 2017 : To be determined

Gulf Cup Champions: 1981, 1983, 1986

== Roster ==
2015 FIBA Asia Championship squad.

Kuwait roster
Players
Coaches

| Pos. | No. | Name | Age – Date of birth | Height | Club |
|---|---|---|---|---|---|---|
| G | 1 | Yousiff Borhamah | 21 – August 2, 1994 | 1.90 m (6 ft 3 in) | Al-Arabi Basketball | (Kuwait) |
| G | 4 | Mashari Abu Dhom | 22 – March 19, 1993 | 1.96 m (6 ft 5 in) | Al-Arabi Basketball | (Kuwait) |
| G | 5 | Hamad Hasan | 18 – August 25, 1997 | 1.88 m (6 ft 2 in) | Kuwait SC (basketball) | (Kuwait) |
| PF | 12 | Abdulaziz Al-Hamidi | 28 – September 16, 1987 | 1.90 m (6 ft 3 in) | Al Qadsia | (Kuwait) |
| G | 13 | Mashari Alshammari | 20 – January 22, 1995 | 1.85 m (6 ft 1 in) | Al-Jahra SC | (Kuwait) |
| C | 15 | Mohammad Marzouq | 23 – May 25, 1992 | 1.98 m (6 ft 6 in) | Al-Shabab SC | (Kuwait) |
| C | 16 | Nasser Al Zafiri | 26 – May 19, 1989 | 1.94 m (6 ft 4 in) | Al Qadsia | (Kuwait) |
| PF | 21 | Abdullah Alshammari | 22 – August 18, 1993 | 1.96 m (6 ft 5 in) | Al Qadsia | (Kuwait) |
| F | 28 | Jum'a Abdel Rahman | 28 – September 8, 1987 | 1.92 m (6 ft 4 in) | Kuwait SC (basketball) | (Kuwait) |
| F | 30 | Abdullah AlSaeid | 26 – November 27, 1988 | 1.95 m (6 ft 5 in) | Kuwait SC (basketball) | (Kuwait) |

Head coach

- (Kuwait) Khaled S M H H Yousef

Assistant coach(es)

- (Kuwait) Abdulaziz S M H H Yousef

Legend

- (C) Team captain
- Club – describes last
  club before the tournament
- Age – describes age
  on 23 September 2015

=== Depth chart ===
| Pos. | Starting 5 | Bench |
|---|---|---|
| C | Abdullah Alshammari | Mohammad Marzouq |
| PF | Abdullah AlSaeid | Nasser Al Zafiri |
| SF | Jum'a Abdel Rahman | Abdulaziz Al-Hamidi |
| SG | Mashari Abu Dhom | Yousiff Borhamah |
| PG | Hamad Hasan | Mashari Alshammari |

== Past rosters ==
2014 Asian Games squad.

Kuwait men's national basketball team - 2014 Asian Games roster
Players
Coaches

| Pos. | No. | Name | Age – Date of birth | Height | Club |
|---|---|---|---|---|---|---|
| PG | 4 | Mashari Abu Dhom | 21 – March 19, 1993 | 1.87 m (6 ft 2 in) | Al Qadsia | (Kuwait) |
| PG | 5 | Ahmad Albaloushi | 24 – April 5, 1990 | 1.82 m (6 ft 0 in) | Al Kuwait SC | (Kuwait) |
| SF | 6 | Hussein Alkhabbaz | 27 – January 6, 1987 | 1.94 m (6 ft 4 in) | Al Kuwait SC | (Kuwait) |
| PF | 7 | Abdullah Alshammari | 25 – February 3, 1989 | 1.96 m (6 ft 5 in) | Al Sahel | (Kuwait) |
| PG | 8 | Shayee Mohanna | 27 – October 30, 1986 | 1.75 m (5 ft 9 in) | Al Sahel | (Kuwait) |
| SG | 9 | Abdullah Alajmi | 27 – August 10, 1987 | 1.80 m (5 ft 11 in) | Al Qadsia | (Kuwait) |
| PF | 10 | Abdulaziz Mohammad (C) | 27 – January 8, 1987 | 1.90 m (6 ft 3 in) | Al Jahraa | (Kuwait) |
| PF | 11 | Mohammad Ashkanani | 30 – February 5, 1984 | 1.90 m (6 ft 3 in) | Kazma | (Kuwait) |
| PF | 12 | Abdulaziz Al-Hamidi | 27 – September 16, 1987 | 1.90 m (6 ft 3 in) | Al Qadsia | (Kuwait) |
| PF | 13 | Nayef Alrashidi | 25 – August 10, 1989 | 1.91 m (6 ft 3 in) | Al Jahraa | (Kuwait) |
| C | 14 | Saleh Albrahim | 24 – May 16, 1990 | 2.02 m (6 ft 8 in) | Al Qadsia | (Kuwait) |
| SG | 15 | Nawwaf Aldhufairi | 26 – June 18, 1988 | 1.76 m (5 ft 9 in) | Kazma | (Kuwait) |

Head coach

- (Bosnia and Herzegovina) Mensur Bajramović

Assistant coach(es)

- (Kuwait) Khaled S M H H Yousef
- (Kuwait) Adnan A H N Alsaeed

Legend

- (C) Team captain
- Club – describes last
  club before the tournament
- Age – describes age
  on 19 September 2014
- Source: incheon2014ag.org

== Head coach ==
- (Kuwait) Mohammad Dhari (2013)
- (Bosnia and Herzegovina) Mensur Bajramović (2014)
- (Spain) Curro Segura (2014)
- (Kuwait) Khaled Yousef (2015)
- (Croatia) Edi Dželalija (2018–2019)
- (Tunisia) Adel Tlatli (2019–)

== Kit ==
=== Sponsor ===
2015: Kuwait Airways

== See also ==
- Kuwait national under-19 basketball team
- Kuwait national under-17 basketball team
- Kuwait women's national basketball team
