= 2016 FIBA Asia Challenge qualification =

Qualifying for the 2016 FIBA Asia Challenge is currently being held to determine the eight teams that will participate in the 2016 FIBA Asia Challenge, aside from the host team Iran and 2015 FIBA Asia Championship winners China. Qualification is via FIBA Asia zone, with each zone having an automatic one berth, plus additional berths from the teams' zones of the second and third runners-up in the 2015 FIBA Asia Championship.

== South Asia ==
The 2016 South Asian Basketball Championship in Bengaluru, India determined South Asia's lone qualifier.

Pos	Team	Pld	W	L	PF	PA	PD	Pts	Qualification
1	India (C)	3	3	0	272	128	+144	6	Qualification to 2016 FIBA Asia Challenge
2	Maldives	3	1	2	162	208	−46	4 (Note: 1–1 head-to-head, 1.08 goal average vs. Nepal and Bangladesh)	
3	Nepal	3	1	2	186	208	−22	4 (Note: 1–1 head-to-head, 1.05 goal average vs. Bangladesh and Maldives)	
4	Bangladesh	3	1	2	158	234	−76	4 (Note: 1–1 head-to-head, 0.88 goal average vs. Nepal and Maldives)	

Rules for classification: (1) Tournament points, (2) Head-to-head tournament points, (3) Head-to-head goal average, (4) Overall goal average, (5) Drawing of lots
(C) Champions

== Southeast Asia ==
The 2016 Southeast Asian Basketball Association Cup in Bangkok, Thailand determined Southeast Asia's two qualifiers.

Pos	Team	Pld	W	L	PF	PA	PD	Pts	Qualification
1	Philippines (C)	4	4	0	338	260	+78	8	Advance to the finals and to the 2016 FIBA Asia Challenge
2	Thailand	4	3	1	319	204	+115	7	Advance to the finals and to the 2016 FIBA Asia Challenge
3	Singapore	4	2	2	210	256	−46	6	Advance to the third place battle
4	Malaysia	4	1	3	279	303	−24	5	Advance to the third place battle
5	Indonesia	4	0	4	185	308	−123	4	Eliminated

Rules for classification: (1) Tournament points, (2) Head-to-head tournament points, (3) Head-to-head goal average, (4) Overall goal average, (5) Drawing of lots
(C) Champions

Hosts Thailand and the Philippines already clinched the SEABA spots due to their top two placings with one more round to go. The Philippines won their second tournament title by defeating the hosts Thailand in the championship match, 97−80.

== West Asia ==
The 2016 West Asian Basketball Association Championship in Amman, Jordan will determine West Asia's two qualifiers. Iran automatically qualified whether or not they win the tournament by virtue of being the host of the main tournament. Nevertheless, they still reigned over the sub-zone tournament by sweeping their opponents.

Pos	Team	Pld	W	L	PF	PA	PD	Pts	Qualification
1	Iran (C)	4	4	0	329	272	+57	8	Qualified as the hosts of 2016 FIBA Asia Challenge
2	Jordan	4	3	1	328	310	+18	7	Qualification to 2016 FIBA Asia Challenge
3	Iraq	4	2	2	311	302	+9	6	Qualification to 2016 FIBA Asia Challenge
4	Lebanon	4	1	3	334	331	+3	5	Eliminated
5	Syria	4	0	4	266	353	−87	4	Eliminated

Rules for classification: (1) Tournament points, (2) Head-to-head tournament points, (3) Head-to-head goal average, (4) Overall goal average, (5) Drawing of lots
(C) Champions

May 30

Iran	81–75	Lebanon

Amman

May 30

Jordan	86–63	Syria

Amman

May 31

Syria	63–93	Iran

Amman

May 31

Iraq	80–84	Jordan

Amman

June 1

Lebanon	90–79	Syria

Amman

June 1

Iran	70–59	Iraq

Amman

June 2

Iraq	88–87	Lebanon

Amman

June 2

Iran	85–75	Jordan

Amman

June 3

Lebanon	82–83	Jordan

Amman

June 3

Iraq	84–61	Syria

Amman
