= Uzbekistan men's national basketball team =

Uzbekistan
- FIBA ranking: NR (1 September 2026)
- Joined FIBA: 1992
- FIBA zone: FIBA Asia
- National federation: UBF

Olympic Games
- Appearances: None

FIBA World Cup
- Appearances: None

FIBA Asia Cup
- Appearances: 6
- Medals: None
Home	Away

The Uzbekistan national basketball team is the national basketball team of Uzbekistan and is governed by the Uzbekistan Basketball Federation.

The team had its best years between the mid-90s and the mid-2000s when it regularly qualified for the FIBA Asia Championship. Its best performance was 7th place at the 1995 Asian Basketball Championship when Uzbekistan finished ahead of heavily favored Iran and Philippines.

== Competitive record ==
=== Summer Olympics ===
yet to qualify

=== World Championship ===
yet to qualify

=== FIBA Asia Cup ===
Year	Position	Pld	W	L
1960 to 1991	Part of Soviet Union			
(Indonesia) 1993	Did not enter			
(South Korea) 1995	7th place	7	3	4
(Saudi Arabia) 1997	Did not enter			
(Japan) 1999	9th place	6	4	2
(China) 2001	9th place	5	3	2
(China) 2003	14th place	7	2	5
(Qatar) 2005	11th place	7	3	4
(Japan) 2007	Did not enter			
(China) 2009	14th place	5	1	4
(China) 2011	12th place	8	1	7
(Philippines) 2013	Did not qualify			
(China) 2015	Did not enter			
(Lebanon) 2017	Did not enter			
(Indonesia) 2022	Did not enter			
(Saudi Arabia) 2025	Did not enter			
2029	Did not enter			
Total	7/32	45	17	28

=== Asian Games ===
- 1994 : Did not qualify
- 1998 : 9th
- 2002 : Did not qualify
- 2006 : 11th
- 2010 : 11th
- 2014 : Did not qualify
- 2018 : Did not participate

=== Islamic Solidarity Games ===
never participated

=== FIBA Asia Challenge ===
2012 - 8th

2014 - Withdraw

== Current roster ==
Team for the FIBA Asia Championship 2011: (last publicized squad)

Uzbekistan men's national basketball team roster
Players
Coaches

Pos.	No.	Name	Age – Date of birth	Height	Club
SG	4	Evgeniy Shatrov	25 – 11 May 1986	1.92 m (6 ft 4 in)
PF	5	Hurmatjon Nuraliev	30 – 1 April 1981	2.01 m (6 ft 7 in)
C	6	Zinnur Khabibullin	37 – 3 July 1974	2.06 m (6 ft 9 in)	MHSK	(Uzbekistan)
F	7	Aleksandr Kozlov	28 – 24 September 1982	2.01 m (6 ft 7 in)	FSK Sogdiana	(Uzbekistan)
SG	8	Vyacheslav Denisov	28 – 21 February 1983	1.90 m (6 ft 3 in)	Dynamo DN	(Ukraine)
F	9	Nail Kadirov	22 – 13 March 1989	2.00 m (6 ft 7 in)
F	10	Samender Juginisov	24 – 29 March 1987	2.02 m (6 ft 8 in)	FSK Sogdiana	(Uzbekistan)
F	11	Gennadiy Zinovev	27 – 29 July 1984	1.98 m (6 ft 6 in)	FSK Sogdiana	(Uzbekistan)
C	12	Aleksandr Yahin	22 – 24 February 1989	2.06 m (6 ft 9 in)
G	13	Evgenly Pereverzev	23 – 20 October 1987	1.81 m (5 ft 11 in)
F	14	Vyacheslav Belokurov	33 – 20 November 1977	2.02 m (6 ft 8 in)	FSK Sogdiana	(Uzbekistan)
SG	15	Denis Timofeev	19 – 12 February 1992	1.88 m (6 ft 2 in)

Head coach

- (Uzbekistan) Oleg Levin

Legend

- Club – describes last
  club before the tournament
- Age – describes age
  on 15 September 2011

=== Depth chart ===
Pos.	Starting 5	Bench 1	Bench 2
C	Aleksandr Yahin	Zinnur Khabibullin
PF	Samender Juginisov	Hurmatjon Nuraliev	Vyacheslav Belokurov
SF	Aleksandr Kozlov	Gennadiy Zinovev	Nail Kadirov
SG	Vyacheslav Denisov	Evgeniy Shatrov	Denis Timofeev
PG	Evgenly Pereverzev

== Past rosters ==
2009 Squad: Head coach: (Uzbekistan) Oleg Levin

#	Pos	Name	Club	Date of birth	Height
4	PG	Kirill Gusev		16 September 1990 (age 18)	185 cm (6 ft 1 in)
5	F	Hurmatjon Nuraliev		1 April 1981 (age 28)	201 cm (6 ft 7 in)
6	F	Artur Sharafutdinov		21 July 1990 (age 19)	200 cm (6 ft 6 1/2 in)
7	F	Timur Inileyev		23 February 1984 (age 25)	197 cm (6 ft 5 1/2 in)
8	G	Vyacheslav Denisov		21 February 1983 (age 26)	190 cm (6 ft 3 in)
9	G	Evgeniy Shatrov		11 May 1986 (age 23)	193 cm (6 ft 4 in)
10	F	Ruslan Abdurahmanov		13 April 1976 (age 33)	203 cm (6 ft 8 in)
11	F	Samender Juginisov		29 March 1987 (age 22)	202 cm (6 ft 7 1/2 in)
12	C	Aleksandr Yahin		24 February 1989 (age 20)	206 cm (6 ft 9 in)
13	F	Aleksandr Kozlov		24 September 1982 (age 26)	202 cm (6 ft 7 1/2 in)
14	PG	Hasan Rahimov		20 December 1987 (age 21)	175 cm (5 ft 9 in)
15	C	Ildar Safarov		24 June 1985 (age 24)	207 cm (6 ft 9 1/2 in)

== Head coach position ==
- (Uzbekistan) Oleg Levin – 2005-2009
- (Uzbekistan) Batir Miradilov - 2010
- (Uzbekistan) Oleg Levin – 2011-2012

== Kit ==
=== Manufacturer ===
2012: Peak

== See also ==
- Uzbekistan national under-17 basketball team
- Uzbekistan women's national basketball team
