= 2005 FIBA Asia Championship =

بطولة أمم آسيا لكرة السلة 2005

Tournament details
- Host country: Qatar
- Dates: 8–16 September
- Teams: 16
- Venues: 2 (in 1 host city)

Final positions
- Champions: China (14th title)
- Runners-up: Lebanon
- Third place: Qatar
- Fourth place: South Korea

Tournament statistics
- MVP: (China) Yao Ming
- Top scorer: (Kuwait) Abdullah Alsarraf (24.1 points per game)

The 2005 FIBA Asia Championship was the men's basketball qualifying tournament for FIBA Asia at the 2006 FIBA World Championship in Japan.

In order to qualify for the tournament, teams would have to go through regional qualifier competitions. At the main tournament, three nations qualified for the world championships including China, Lebanon and the host country, Qatar. China defeated Lebanon in the championship game, 77–61; and Qatar defeated Korea, 89–77.

== Qualification ==
According to the FIBA Asia rules, each zone had two places, and the hosts (Qatar) and Stanković Cup champion (Korea as runner-up) were automatically qualified. The other four places are allocated to the zones according to performance in the 2004 FIBA Asia Stanković Cup.

East Asia (1+2+2)	Gulf (1+2)	Middle Asia (2+1)	Southeast Asia (2)	West Asia (2+1)
South Korea	Qatar	Kazakhstan	Malaysia	Iran
China	Saudi Arabia	India	Indonesia	Lebanon
Chinese Taipei	Kuwait	Uzbekistan		Jordan
Japan				
Hong Kong				

== Draw ==
Group A	Group B	Group C	Group D
South Korea; Kuwait; Malaysia; Saudi Arabia	China; Iran; Uzbekistan; Chinese Taipei	Qatar; Japan; Kazakhstan; Indonesia	Lebanon; Jordan; Hong Kong; India

== Preliminary round ==
=== Group A ===
Team	Pld	W	L	PF	PA	PD	Pts
South Korea	3	3	0	274	196	+78	6
Saudi Arabia	3	2	1	224	237	−13	5
Kuwait	3	1	2	252	228	+24	4
Malaysia	3	0	3	165	254	−89	3

September 9
14:00

South Korea	85–80	Kuwait

Al-Gharafa Indoor Hall, Doha

September 9
20:45

Malaysia	51–79	Saudi Arabia

Al-Gharafa Indoor Hall, Doha

September 10
14:00

Kuwait	88–56	Malaysia

Al-Gharafa Indoor Hall, Doha

September 10
16:15

Saudi Arabia	58–102	South Korea
Scoring by quarter: 10–24, 13–28, 14–26, 21–24

Al-Gharafa Indoor Hall, Doha

September 11
14:00

South Korea	87–58	Malaysia

Al-Gharafa Indoor Hall, Doha

September 11
18:30

Saudi Arabia	87–84	Kuwait

Al-Gharafa Indoor Hall, Doha

=== Group B ===
Team	Pld	W	L	PF	PA	PD	Pts
China	3	3	0	235	171	+64	6
Iran	3	2	1	210	176	+34	5
Chinese Taipei	3	1	2	226	212	+14	4
Uzbekistan	3	0	3	166	278	−112	3

September 8
9:30

Iran	61–76	China
Scoring by quarter: 15–14, 20–18, 15–27, 11–17

Al-Gharafa Indoor Hall, Doha

September 8
16:15

Chinese Taipei	111–71	Uzbekistan
Scoring by quarter: 26–19, 27–15, 27–25, 31–12

Al-Gharafa Indoor Hall, Doha

September 9
9:30

Uzbekistan	43–84	Iran

Al-Rayyan Indoor Hall, Doha

September 9
16:15

China	76–58	Chinese Taipei
Scoring by quarter: 25–15, 20–16, 17–11, 14–16

Al-Gharafa Indoor Hall, Doha

September 11
9:30

China	83–52	Uzbekistan
Scoring by quarter: 20–14, 24–6, 24–20, 15–12

Al-Gharafa Indoor Hall, Doha

September 11
16:15

Chinese Taipei	57–65	Iran
Scoring by quarter: 13–14, 13–14, 17–21, 14–16

Al-Gharafa Indoor Hall, Doha

=== Group C ===
Team	Pld	W	L	PF	PA	PD	Pts
Qatar	3	3	0	249	184	+65	6
Japan	3	2	1	226	197	+29	5
Kazakhstan	3	1	2	215	215	0	4
Indonesia	3	0	3	181	275	−94	3

September 8
11:45

Kazakhstan	89–62	Indonesia
Scoring by quarter: 33–16, 10–19, 31–14, 15–13

Al-Gharafa Indoor Hall, Doha

September 8
18:30

Qatar	74–62	Japan
Scoring by quarter: 24–16, 17–13, 20–15, 13–18

Al-Gharafa Indoor Hall, Doha

September 9
9:30

Japan	67–66	Kazakhstan
Scoring by quarter: 13–21, 16–13, 21–20, 17–12

Al-Gharafa Indoor Hall, Doha

September 9
18:30

Indonesia	62–89	Qatar
Scoring by quarter: 21–27, 13–25, 11–20, 17–17

Al-Gharafa Indoor Hall, Doha

September 10
9:30

Japan	97–57	Indonesia
Scoring by quarter: 27–13, 18–7, 24–23, 28–14

Al-Gharafa Indoor Hall, Doha

September 10
18:30

Qatar	86–60	Kazakhstan
Scoring by quarter: 25–13, 23–5, 22–21, 16–21

Al-Gharafa Indoor Hall, Doha

=== Group D ===
Team	Pld	W	L	PF	PA	PD	Pts
Lebanon	3	3	0	283	191	+92	6
Jordan	3	2	1	244	152	+92	5
India	3	1	2	232	269	−37	4
Hong Kong	3	0	3	176	323	−147	3

September 8
14:00

India	106–87	Hong Kong
Scoring by quarter: 26–11, 13–19, 34–26, 33–31

Al-Gharafa Indoor Hall, Doha

September 8
20:45

Jordan	59–69	Lebanon
Scoring by quarter: 11–12, 14–20, 20–16, 14–21

Al-Gharafa Indoor Hall, Doha

September 10
11:45

Hong Kong	36–108	Jordan
Scoring by quarter: 9–26, 9–31, 15–23, 3–28

Al-Gharafa Indoor Hall, Doha

September 10
20:45

Lebanon	105–79	India

Al-Gharafa Indoor Hall, Doha

September 11
11:45

India	47–77	Jordan
Scoring by quarter: 15–22, 5–13, 12–22, 15–20

Al-Gharafa Indoor Hall, Doha

September 11
20:45

Lebanon	109–53	Hong Kong

Al-Gharafa Indoor Hall, Doha

== Quarterfinal round ==
=== Group I ===
Team	Pld	W	L	PF	PA	PD	Pts
Qatar	3	3	0	243	178	+65	6
South Korea	3	2	1	216	221	−5	5
Iran	3	1	2	212	230	−18	4
Jordan	3	0	3	182	224	−42	3

September 12
16:15

South Korea	64–63	Jordan
Scoring by quarter: 16–14, 13–25, 7–16, 28–8

Al-Gharafa Indoor Hall, Doha

September 12
18:30

Iran	58–79	Qatar
Scoring by quarter: 15–16, 15–21, 13–26, 15–16

Al-Gharafa Indoor Hall, Doha

September 13
16:15

Jordan	64–79	Iran
Scoring by quarter: 11–13, 14–23, 9–14, 30–29

Al-Gharafa Indoor Hall, Doha

September 13
18:30

Qatar	83–65	South Korea
Scoring by quarter: 23–19, 18–12, 25–15, 17–19

Al-Gharafa Indoor Hall, Doha

September 14
16:15

South Korea	87–75	Iran

Al-Gharafa Indoor Hall, Doha

September 14
18:30

Qatar	81–55	Jordan
Scoring by quarter: 14–8, 21–8, 19–18, 27–21

Al-Gharafa Indoor Hall, Doha

=== Group II ===
Team	Pld	W	L	PF	PA	PD	Pts
China	3	3	0	271	136	+135	6
Lebanon	3	2	1	247	209	+38	5
Japan	3	1	2	201	207	−6	4
Saudi Arabia	3	0	3	117	284	−167	3

September 12
14:00

China	86–53	Japan
Scoring by quarter: 20–9, 17–6, 20–12, 29–26

Al-Gharafa Indoor Hall, Doha

September 12
20:45

Saudi Arabia	63–97	Lebanon
Scoring by quarter: 22–22, 14–33, 17–26, 10–16

Al-Gharafa Indoor Hall, Doha

September 13
14:00

Japan	89–44	Saudi Arabia
Scoring by quarter: 22–10, 17–11, 25–12, 25–11

Al-Gharafa Indoor Hall, Doha

September 13
20:45

Lebanon	73–87	China
Scoring by quarter: 17–24, 10–26, 23–18, 23–19

Al-Gharafa Indoor Hall, Doha

September 14
14:00

Saudi Arabia	10–98	China
Scoring by quarter: 4–35, 2–21, 2–26, 2–16

Al-Gharafa Indoor Hall, Doha

September 14
20:45

Japan	59–77	Lebanon
Scoring by quarter: 22–27, 7–16, 15–28, 15–6

Al-Gharafa Indoor Hall, Doha

=== Group III ===
Team	Pld	W	L	PF	PA	PD	Pts
Kazakhstan	3	3	0	284	195	+89	6
Uzbekistan	3	2	1	232	219	+13	5
Kuwait	3	1	2	226	252	−26	4
Hong Kong	3	0	3	175	251	−76	3

September 12
11:45

Kuwait	81–66	Hong Kong

Al-Gharafa Indoor Hall, Doha

September 12
11:45

Uzbekistan	56–104	Kazakhstan

Al-Rayyan Indoor Hall, Doha

September 13
11:45

Kazakhstan	96–77	Kuwait

Al-Gharafa Indoor Hall, Doha

September 13
11:45

Hong Kong	47–86	Uzbekistan

Al-Rayyan Indoor Hall, Doha

September 14
9:30

Kazakhstan	84–62	Hong Kong

Al-Rayyan Indoor Hall, Doha

September 14
11:45

Kuwait	68–90	Uzbekistan

Al-Gharafa Indoor Hall, Doha

=== Group IV ===
Team	Pld	W	L	PF	PA	PD	Pts
Chinese Taipei	3	3	0	324	257	+67	6
India	3	2	1	258	246	+12	5
Indonesia	3	1	2	213	253	−40	4
Malaysia	3	0	3	212	251	−39	3

September 12
9:30

Malaysia	75–82	India

Al-Rayyan Indoor Hall, Doha

September 12
9:30

Chinese Taipei	109–88	Indonesia

Al-Gharafa Indoor Hall, Doha

September 13
9:30

Malaysia	58–60	Indonesia

Al-Rayyan Indoor Hall, Doha

September 13
9:30

India	90–106	Chinese Taipei

Al-Gharafa Indoor Hall, Doha

September 14
9:30

Malaysia	79–109	Chinese Taipei

Al-Gharafa Indoor Hall, Doha

September 14
11:45

Indonesia	65–86	India

Al-Rayyan Indoor Hall, Doha

== Classification 9th–16th ==
=== 15th place ===
September 16
9:30

Hong Kong	72–68	Malaysia

Al-Gharafa Indoor Hall, Doha

=== 13th place ===
September 15
11:45

Kuwait	86–52	Indonesia

Al-Gharafa Indoor Hall, Doha

=== 11th place ===
September 16
11:45

Uzbekistan	63–55	India

Al-Gharafa Indoor Hall, Doha

=== 9th place ===
September 15
9:30

Kazakhstan	69–77	Chinese Taipei

Al-Gharafa Indoor Hall, Doha

== Classification 5th–8th ==
Semifinals
September 15
Iran	79
Saudi Arabia	34
September 15
Japan	67
Jordan	59

5th place
September 16
Iran	61
Japan	72
7th place
September 16
Saudi Arabia	50
Jordan	88

=== Semifinals ===
September 15
14:00

Iran	79–34	Saudi Arabia

Al-Gharafa Indoor Hall, Doha

September 15
16:15

Japan	67–59	Jordan
Scoring by quarter: 12–11, 26–17, 17–18, 12–13

Al-Gharafa Indoor Hall, Doha

=== 7th place ===
September 16
14:00

Saudi Arabia	50–88	Jordan
Scoring by quarter: 13–15, 11–29, 14–29, 12–15

Al-Gharafa Indoor Hall, Doha

=== 5th place ===
September 16
16:15

Iran	61–72	Japan
Scoring by quarter: 11–17, 13–19, 12–15, 25–21

Al-Gharafa Indoor Hall, Doha

== Final round ==
Semifinals
September 15
Qatar	79
Lebanon	83
September 15
China	93
South Korea	49

Final
September 16
Lebanon	61
China	77
3rd place
September 16
Qatar	89
South Korea	77

=== Semifinals ===
September 15
18:30

Qatar	79–83	Lebanon
Scoring by quarter: 22–18, 13–21, 22–23, 22–21

Al-Gharafa Indoor Hall, Doha

September 15
20:45

China	93–49	South Korea
Scoring by quarter: 24–18, 24–15, 29–2, 16–14

Al-Gharafa Indoor Hall, Doha

=== 3rd place ===
September 16
18:30

Qatar	89–77	South Korea
Scoring by quarter: 15–27, 26–22, 21–16, 27–12

Al-Gharafa Indoor Hall, Doha

=== Final ===
September 16
20:45

Lebanon	61–77	China
Scoring by quarter: 10–18, 16–15, 20–19, 15–25
Pts: El Khatib 24		Pts: Yao M. 24

Al-Gharafa Indoor Hall, Doha

== Final standings ==
Qualified for the 2006 FIBA World Championship

Rank	Team	Record
1st place, gold medalist(s)	China	8–0
2nd place, silver medalist(s)	Lebanon	6–2
3rd place, bronze medalist(s)	Qatar	7–1
4	South Korea	5–3
5	Japan	5–3
6	Iran	4–4
7	Jordan	3–5
8	Saudi Arabia	2–6
9	Chinese Taipei	5–2
10	Kazakhstan	4–3
11	Uzbekistan	3–4
12	India	3–4
13	Kuwait	3–4
14	Indonesia	1–6
15	Hong Kong	1–6
16	Malaysia	0–7

== Awards ==
2005 Asian champions

China
Fourteenth title
