= 2003 ABC Championship =

22nd asian championship of basketball

2003年亞洲籃球錦標賽

Tournament details
- Host country: China
- City: Harbin
- Dates: September 23 – October 1
- Teams: 16
- Venues: 2 (in 1 host city)

Final positions
- Champions: China (13th title)
- Runners-up: South Korea
- Third place: Qatar
- Fourth place: Lebanon

Tournament statistics
- MVP: (China) Yao Ming
- Top scorer: (China) Yao Ming (22.9 points per game)

The 2003 Asian Basketball Confederation Championship for Men was the qualifying tournament for the Basketball Tournament at the 2004 Summer Olympics in Athens, Greece. The tournament was held in Harbin, China from September 23 to October 1, 2003.

== Qualification ==
According to the ABC rules, each zone had two places, and the hosts (China) and the best 5 teams of the previous Asian Championship were automatically qualified.

East Asia (3+2)	Gulf (1+2)	Middle Asia (2)	Southeast Asia (2)	West Asia (2+2)
China	Qatar	Uzbekistan	Philippines	Lebanon
South Korea	~~United Arab Emirates~~ *	India	Malaysia	Syria
Japan	~~Saudi Arabia~~ *			Jordan
Chinese Taipei				Iran
Hong Kong				

* Withdrew, Kazakhstan and Kuwait were given a wild card entry into the championship.

== Draw ==
Group A	Group B	Group C	Group D
Lebanon; Uzbekistan; Hong Kong; Kazakhstan	South Korea; India; Kuwait; Malaysia	Syria; Chinese Taipei; Iran; China	Qatar; Japan; Philippines; Jordan

== Preliminary round ==
=== Group A ===
Team	Pld	W	L	PF	PA	PD	Pts
Lebanon	3	3	0	257	197	+60	6
Kazakhstan	3	2	1	242	227	+15	5
Uzbekistan	3	1	2	194	238	−44	4
Hong Kong	3	0	3	213	244	−31	3

September 23
10:00

Uzbekistan	68–64	Hong Kong
Scoring by quarter: 21–10, 12–26, 11–18, 24–10

Tianrun Gymnasium, Harbin

September 23
14:00

Lebanon	79–70	Kazakhstan
Scoring by quarter: 20–21, 23–23, 22–10, 14–16

Tianrun Gymnasium, Harbin

September 24
10:00

Hong Kong	67–90	Lebanon
Scoring by quarter: 16–23, 15–25, 18–19, 18–23

Tianrun Gymnasium, Harbin

September 24
14:00

Kazakhstan	86–66	Uzbekistan
Scoring by quarter: 23–18, 21–27, 26–10, 16–11

Tianrun Gymnasium, Harbin

September 25
10:00

Kazakhstan	86–82	Hong Kong
Scoring by quarter: 27–20, 21–18, 19–19, 19–25

Tianrun Gymnasium, Harbin

September 25
14:00

Lebanon	88–60	Uzbekistan
Scoring by quarter: 21–9, 19–16, 22–16, 26–19

Tianrun Gymnasium, Harbin

=== Group B ===
Team	Pld	W	L	PF	PA	PD	Pts
South Korea	3	3	0	319	219	+100	6
India	3	2	1	251	257	−6	5
Kuwait	3	1	2	231	270	−39	4
Malaysia	3	0	3	215	270	−55	3

September 23
12:00

India	94–74	Kuwait
Scoring by quarter: 19–12, 28–12, 18–18, 29–32

Heida Gymnasium, Harbin

September 23
19:30

South Korea	103–72	Malaysia
Scoring by quarter: 24–12, 27–25, 21–15, 31–20

Heida Gymnasium, Harbin

September 24
16:00

Malaysia	62–81	India
Scoring by quarter: 13–25, 16–18, 11–16, 22–22

Heida Gymnasium, Harbin

September 24
19:30

Kuwait	71–95	South Korea
Scoring by quarter: 21–23, 14–23, 15–23, 21–26

Heida Gymnasium, Harbin

September 25
16:00

Kuwait	86–81	Malaysia
Scoring by quarter: 24–23, 19–21, 21–20, 22–17

Heida Gymnasium, Harbin

September 25
19:30

South Korea	121–76	India
Scoring by quarter: 27–15, 32–14, 28–21, 34–26

Heida Gymnasium, Harbin

=== Group C ===
Team	Pld	W	L	PF	PA	PD	Pts
China	3	3	0	317	181	+136	6
Iran	3	2	1	234	234	0	5
Chinese Taipei	3	1	2	229	288	−59	4
Syria	3	0	3	202	279	−77	3

September 23
16:00

Chinese Taipei	74–83	Iran
Scoring by quarter: 17–21, 17–17, 12–22, 28–23

Tianrun Gymnasium, Harbin

September 23
19:30

China	103–51	Syria
Scoring by quarter: 32–9, 22–19, 23–9, 26–14

Tianrun Gymnasium, Harbin

September 24
16:00

Iran	82–67	Syria
Scoring by quarter: 13–20, 23–11, 20–19, 26–17

Tianrun Gymnasium, Harbin

September 24
19:30

Chinese Taipei	61–121	China
Scoring by quarter: 16–28, 12–30, 9–29, 24–34

Tianrun Gymnasium, Harbin

September 25
16:00

Syria	84–94	Chinese Taipei
Scoring by quarter: 26–28, 25–21, 21–25, 12–20

Tianrun Gymnasium, Harbin

September 25
19:30

China	93–69	Iran
Scoring by quarter: 26–16, 31–16, 20–11, 16–26

Tianrun Gymnasium, Harbin

=== Group D ===
Team	Pld	W	L	PF	PA	PD	Pts
Qatar	3	3	0	211	169	+42	6
Japan	3	2	1	176	191	−15	5
Philippines	3	1	2	216	210	+6	4
Jordan	3	0	3	179	212	−33	3

September 23
14:00

Japan	66–64	Philippines
Scoring by quarter: 18–18, 17–18, 18–13, 13–15

Heida Gymnasium, Harbin

September 23
16:00

Qatar	66–53	Jordan
Scoring by quarter: 22–10, 12–10, 15–18, 17–15

Heida Gymnasium, Harbin

September 24
10:00

Philippines	69–77	Qatar
Scoring by quarter: 19–17, 13–20, 13–19, 24–21

Heida Gymnasium, Harbin

September 24
14:00

Jordan	59–63	Japan
Scoring by quarter: 18–20, 9–15, 11–12, 21–16

Heida Gymnasium, Harbin

September 25
10:00

Qatar	68–47	Japan
Scoring by quarter: 15–6, 16–16, 14–19, 23–6

Heida Gymnasium, Harbin

September 25
14:00

Philippines	83–67	Jordan
Scoring by quarter: 18–14, 24–17, 23–14, 18–22

Heida Gymnasium, Harbin

== Quarterfinal round ==
=== Group I ===
Team	Pld	W	L	PF	PA	PD	Pts
China	3	3	0	315	193	+122	6
Lebanon	3	2	1	264	255	+9	5
Japan	3	1	2	226	238	−12	4
India	3	0	3	218	337	−119	3

September 26
16:00

Lebanon	76–63	Japan
Scoring by quarter: 22–25, 19–15, 12–12, 23–11

Tianrun Gymnasium, Harbin

September 26
19:30

India	62–117	China
Scoring by quarter: 15–33, 8–28, 16–27, 23–29

Tianrun Gymnasium, Harbin

September 27
16:00

Japan	103–74	India
Scoring by quarter: 26–14, 29–23, 23–20, 25–17

Heida Gymnasium, Harbin

September 27
19:30

China	110–71	Lebanon
Scoring by quarter: 31–17, 21–16, 24–21, 34–17

Heida Gymnasium, Harbin

September 28
16:00

Lebanon	117–82	India
Scoring by quarter: 31–19, 30–21, 31–16, 25–26

Tianrun Gymnasium, Harbin

September 28
19:30

Japan	60–88	China
Scoring by quarter: 18–22, 14–25, 10–13, 18–28

Tianrun Gymnasium, Harbin

=== Group II ===
Team	Pld	W	L	PF	PA	PD	Pts
South Korea	3	3	0	291	249	+42	6
Qatar	3	2	1	235	212	+23	5
Iran	3	1	2	237	262	−25	4
Kazakhstan	3	0	3	234	274	−40	3

September 26
16:00

Qatar	83–61	Kazakhstan
Scoring by quarter: 25–15, 22–14, 18–17, 18–15

Heida Gymnasium, Harbin

September 26
19:30

South Korea	105–81	Iran
Scoring by quarter: 26–20, 28–24, 24–14, 27–23

Heida Gymnasium, Harbin

September 27
16:00

Iran	92–85	Kazakhstan
Scoring by quarter: 18–10, 16–19, 25–28, 33–28

Tianrun Gymnasium, Harbin

September 27
19:30

Qatar	80–87	South Korea
Scoring by quarter: 17–23, 20-27, 12–22, 31–15

Tianrun Gymnasium, Harbin

September 28
16:00

Kazakhstan	88–99	South Korea
Scoring by quarter: 16–23, 27–21, 18–31, 27–24

Heida Gymnasium, Harbin

September 28
19:30

Iran	64–72	Qatar
Scoring by quarter: 14–20, 9–12, 20–23, 21–17

Heida Gymnasium, Harbin

=== Group III ===
Team	Pld	W	L	PF	PA	PD	Pts
Jordan	3	3	0	238	213	+25	6
Chinese Taipei	3	2	1	288	220	+68	5
Uzbekistan	3	1	2	255	277	−22	4
Malaysia	3	0	3	197	268	−71	3

September 26
10:00

Uzbekistan	83–86	Jordan
Scoring by quarter: 19–22, 18–21, 23–22, 23–21

Tianrun Gymnasium, Harbin

September 26
14:00

Malaysia	63–101	Chinese Taipei
Scoring by quarter: 19–27, 21–29, 9–31, 14–14

Tianrun Gymnasium, Harbin

September 27
10:00

Jordan	69–58	Malaysia
Scoring by quarter: 8–11, 20–18, 21–7, 20–22

Tianrun Gymnasium, Harbin

September 27
14:00

Chinese Taipei	115–74	Uzbekistan
Scoring by quarter: 29–14, 30–18, 32–21, 24–21

Tianrun Gymnasium, Harbin

September 28
10:00

Uzbekistan	98–76	Malaysia
Scoring by quarter: 26–21, 22–19, 25–16, 25–20

Tianrun Gymnasium, Harbin

September 28
14:00

Chinese Taipei	72–83	Jordan
Scoring by quarter: 17–23, 15–20, 22–14, 18–26

Tianrun Gymnasium, Harbin

=== Group IV ===
Team	Pld	W	L	PF	PA	PD	Pts	Tiebreaker
Syria	3	2	1	279	234	+45	5	1–1 / 1.172
Kuwait	3	2	1	236	220	+16	5	1–1 / 1.019
Hong Kong	3	2	1	222	244	−22	5	1–1 / 0.839
Philippines	3	0	3	201	240	−39	3	

September 26
10:00

Hong Kong	66–58	Philippines
Scoring by quarter: 19–15, 16–17, 18–4, 13–22

Heida Gymnasium, Harbin

September 26
14:00

Kuwait	80–75	Syria
Scoring by quarter: 17–23, 21–19, 21–15, 21–18

Heida Gymnasium, Harbin

September 27
10:00

Syria	109–77	Hong Kong
Scoring by quarter: 28–27, 18–11, 31–13, 32–26

Heida Gymnasium, Harbin

September 27
14:00

Philippines	66–79	Kuwait
Scoring by quarter: 11–14, 18–26, 20–22, 17–17

Heida Gymnasium, Harbin

September 28
10:00

Hong Kong	79–77	Kuwait
Scoring by quarter: 15–27, 21–13, 19–20, 24–17

Heida Gymnasium, Harbin

September 28
14:00

Syria	95–77	Philippines
Scoring by quarter: 23–27, 24–15, 31–12, 17–23

Heida Gymnasium, Harbin

== Classification 5th–16th ==
=== 15th place ===
September 30
14:00

Malaysia	63–78	Philippines
Scoring by quarter: 13–17, 10–18, 18–28, 22–15

Heida Gymnasium, Harbin

=== 13th place ===
September 30
16:00

Uzbekistan	85–106	Hong Kong
Scoring by quarter: 25–20, 20–30, 22–27, 18–29

Heida Gymnasium, Harbin

=== 11th place ===
September 30
19:30

Chinese Taipei	102–81	Kuwait
Scoring by quarter: 21–16, 28–15, 20–24, 33–26

Heida Gymnasium, Harbin

=== 9th place ===
September 30
14:00

Jordan	75–92	Syria
Scoring by quarter: 16–26, 23–22, 18–23, 18–21

Tianrun Gymnasium, Harbin

=== 7th place ===
October 1
14:00

India	82–84	Kazakhstan
Scoring by quarter: 19–26, 27–21, 15–17, 21–20

Heida Gymnasium, Harbin

=== 5th place ===
October 1
16:00

Japan	61–67	Iran
Scoring by quarter: 14–23, 14–20, 13–10, 20–14

Heida Gymnasium, Harbin

== Final round ==
Semifinals
September 30
Lebanon	83
South Korea (OT)	85
September 30
China	86
Qatar	61

Final
October 1
South Korea	96
China	106
3rd place
October 1
Lebanon	67
Qatar	77

=== Semifinals ===
September 30
16:00

Lebanon	83–85 (OT)	South Korea
Scoring by quarter: 9–22, 26–21, 20–14, 19–17, Overtime: 9–11

Tianrun Gymnasium, Harbin

September 30
19:30

China	86–61	Qatar
Scoring by quarter: 23–17, 23–14, 17–10, 23–20

Tianrun Gymnasium, Harbin

=== 3rd place ===
October 1
16:00

Lebanon	67–77	Qatar
Scoring by quarter: 23–26, 21–27, 14–10, 9–14

Tianrun Gymnasium, Harbin

=== Final ===
October 1
19:30

South Korea	96–106	China
Scoring by quarter: 15–24, 21–26, 28–22, 32–34
Pts: Lee K.S. 28		Pts: Yao M. 30

Tianrun Gymnasium, Harbin

== Final standings ==
Qualified for the 2004 Summer Olympics

Rank	Team	Record
1st place, gold medalist(s)	China	8–0
2nd place, silver medalist(s)	South Korea	7–1
3rd place, bronze medalist(s)	Qatar	6–2
4	Lebanon	5–3
5	Iran	4–3
6	Japan	3–4
7	Kazakhstan	3–4
8	India	2–5
9	Syria	3–4
10	Jordan	3–4
11	Chinese Taipei	4–3
12	Kuwait	3–4
13	Hong Kong	3–4
14	Uzbekistan	2–5
15	Philippines	2–5
16	Malaysia	0–7

== Awards ==
2003 Asian champions

China
Thirteenth title
