= 1960 ABC Championship =

1960 FIBA Asia Cup
1st Asian Basketball Championship

Tournament details
- Host country: Philippines
- Dates: January 16–28
- Teams: 7 (from all Asian federations)
- Venue(s): 1 (in 1 host city)

Final positions
- Champions: Philippines (1st title)

Tournament statistics
- MVP: (Philippines) Carlos Badion

The 1960 ABC Championship was the first edition of the ABC Championship, a tournament which was held by FIBA Asia. The tournament which was held in Manila, Philippines saw seven teams compete in a round-robin tournament with the top four teams qualifying through to the final round where they played each other again one more time.

In the final round, the Philippines took out the title as they won all nine of their games to come out the winners. Taiwan finished as the runner-up with the only two losses being against the champions. Japan rounded out the podium in third.

== Preliminary round ==
Team	Pld	W	L	PF	PA	PD	Pts
Philippines	6	6	0	623	405	+218	12
Taiwan	6	5	1	517	432	+85	11
Japan	6	4	2	448	443	+5	10
South Korea	6	3	3	520	461	+59	9
Hong Kong	6	2	4	516	542	−26	8
Indonesia	6	1	5	404	522	−118	7
Malaya	6	0	6	435	658	−223	6

January 16

South Korea	93–78	Hong Kong
Scoring by half: 53–39, 40–39

Rizal Memorial Coliseum, Manila

January 16

Indonesia	46–92	Philippines
Scoring by half: 29–40, 17–52

Rizal Memorial Coliseum, Manila

January 16

Japan	88–68	Malaya
Scoring by half: 41–31, 47–37

Rizal Memorial Coliseum, Manila

January 17

Philippines	115–66	Hong Kong
Scoring by half: 61–40, 54–26

Rizal Memorial Coliseum, Manila

January 17

Indonesia	67–74	Japan
Scoring by half: 34–40, 33–34

Rizal Memorial Coliseum, Manila

January 17

South Korea	71–78	Taiwan
Scoring by half: 30–42, 41–36

Rizal Memorial Coliseum, Manila

January 18

Hong Kong	96–72	Indonesia
Scoring by half: 47–32, 49–40

Rizal Memorial Coliseum, Manila

January 18

Malaya	58–126	Philippines
Scoring by half: 25–54, 33–72

Rizal Memorial Coliseum, Manila

January 18

Japan	59–71	Taiwan
Scoring by half: 35–32, 24–39

Rizal Memorial Coliseum, Manila

January 19

Taiwan	110–74	Malaya
Scoring by half: 60–27, 50–47

Rizal Memorial Coliseum, Manila

January 19

Hong Kong	73–81	Japan
Scoring by half: 28–45, 45–36

Rizal Memorial Coliseum, Manila

January 19

South Korea	79–97	Philippines
Scoring by half: 42–45, 37–52

Rizal Memorial Coliseum, Manila

January 20

Malaya	76–98	Indonesia
Scoring by half: 35–46, 41–52

Rizal Memorial Coliseum, Manila

January 20

Taiwan	87–81	Hong Kong
Scoring by half: 38–38, 49–43

Rizal Memorial Coliseum, Manila

January 20

South Korea	67–73	Japan
Scoring by half: 35–36, 32–37

Rizal Memorial Coliseum, Manila

January 21

Taiwan	88–51	Indonesia
Scoring by half: 52–25, 36–26

Rizal Memorial Coliseum, Manila

January 21

Japan	73–97	Philippines
Scoring by half: 34–49, 39–48

Rizal Memorial Coliseum, Manila

January 21

Malaya	65–114	South Korea
Scoring by half: 27–47, 38–67

Rizal Memorial Coliseum, Manila

January 22

Malaya	94–122	Hong Kong
Scoring by half: 48–59, 46–63

Rizal Memorial Coliseum, Manila

January 22

Indonesia	70–96	South Korea
Scoring by half: 34–40, 36–56

Rizal Memorial Coliseum, Manila

January 22

Taiwan	83–96	Philippines
Scoring by half: 39–45, 44–51

Rizal Memorial Coliseum, Manila

== Final round ==
- The results and the points of the preliminary round shall be taken into account for the final round.

Team	Pld	W	L	PF	PA	PD	Pts
Philippines	9	9	0	910	645	+265	18
Taiwan	9	7	2	774	685	+89	16
Japan	9	5	4	683	703	−20	14
South Korea	9	3	6	771	738	+33	12

January 24

Japan	69–84	Taiwan
Scoring by half: 24–38, 45–46

Rizal Memorial Coliseum, Manila

January 24

South Korea	82–96	Philippines
Scoring by half: 44–48, 38–48

Rizal Memorial Coliseum, Manila

January 26

Taiwan	95–85	South Korea
Scoring by half: 45–41, 50–44

Rizal Memorial Coliseum, Manila

January 26

Philippines	92–80	Japan
Scoring by half: 43–25, 49–55

Rizal Memorial Coliseum, Manila

January 28

Japan	86–84	South Korea
Scoring by half: 55–51, 31–33

Rizal Memorial Coliseum, Manila

January 28

Philippines	99–78	Taiwan
Scoring by half: 46–34, 53–44

Rizal Memorial Coliseum, Manila

== Final standings ==
Rank	Team	Record
1st place, gold medalist(s)	Philippines	9–0
2nd place, silver medalist(s)	Taiwan	7–2
3rd place, bronze medalist(s)	Japan	5–4
4	South Korea	3–6
5	Hong Kong	2–4
6	Indonesia	1–5
7	Malaya	0–6

== Awards ==
1960 Asian champions

Philippines
First title
