= 2025 FIBA Asia Cup qualification =

International qualification tournament

Tournament details
- Dates: 2 June 2022 – 23 March 2025
- Teams: 30 (from 2 confederations)

Official website
- Qualifiers website Pre-qualifiers website

The 2025 FIBA Asia Cup qualification was a basketball competition that was played from June 2022 to March 2025, to determine the fifteen FIBA Asia-Oceania nations who would join the automatically qualified host Saudi Arabia at the 2025 FIBA Asia Cup.

== Format ==
The qualification process started in 2022, with pre-qualifiers being contested on sub-zone and regional basis. Eight teams advanced to the qualifiers, joining the sixteen teams from the 2023 FIBA World Cup Asian Qualifiers.

== Entrants ==
Teams entering the qualifiers (from the 2022 FIBA Asia Cup)
| West Region | East Region |
|---|---|
| Iran; Jordan; Lebanon; Kazakhstan; Saudi Arabia; India; Syria; Bahrain | Australia; New Zealand; China; South Korea; Philippines; Japan; Chinese Taipei; Indonesia |

Teams entering the pre-qualifiers (any team that did not participate in the 2022 FIBA Asia Cup)
| West Region | | | | East Region | | |
| West Asia (WABA sub-zone) | Gulf (GBA sub-zone) | Central Asia (CABA sub-zone) | South Asia (SABA sub-zone) | East Asia (EABA sub-zone) | Southeast Asia (SEABA sub-zone) | Oceania (FIBA Oceania) |
|---|---|---|---|---|---|---|
| Iraq; Palestine | Qatar; United Arab Emirates; Kuwait; Oman | Uzbekistan | Sri Lanka; Bangladesh | Hong Kong; Mongolia | Thailand; Malaysia; Singapore; Vietnam; Cambodia | Guam; Tahiti |

== Pre-qualifiers ==
=== Participating teams ===
Teams entering
| West Region | East Region |
|---|---|
| Iraq; Palestine; Qatar; United Arab Emirates; Kuwait; Oman; Uzbekistan; Sri Lanka; Bangladesh | Hong Kong; Mongolia; Thailand; Malaysia; Singapore; Vietnam; Cambodia; Guam; Tahiti |

=== First round ===
Teams played a round-robin tournament to determine the three best ranked teams that advanced to the second round.

Teams from the WABA, GBA, CABA, and SABA sub-zones played in Group A and B, forming the West region. While teams from Oceania and the SEABA and EABA sub-zones played in Groups C and D, forming the East region. The groups were played at a single venue.

The teams were organized in four groups, according to the serpentine system (for each Region), according to the FIBA World Ranking (December 2021) as follows:

| West Region | | East Region | |
| Group A | Group B | Group C | Group D |
|---|---|---|---|
| Qatar (76); United Arab Emirates (126); Sri Lanka (132); Oman (157) | Iraq (86); Palestine (89); Kuwait (141); Bangladesh (144); Uzbekistan (N/A) | Guam (88); Singapore (112); Hong Kong (114); Cambodia (159) | Tahiti (97); Thailand (107); Malaysia (121); Vietnam (140); Mongolia (N/A) |

==== Group A ====
The tournament was held in Qatar.

| Pos | Team | Pld | W | L | PF | PA | PD | Pts | Qualification |
|---|---|---|---|---|---|---|---|---|---|
| 1 | Qatar (H) | 2 | 2 | 0 | 127 | 110 | +17 | 4 | Second round |
| 2 | United Arab Emirates | 2 | 1 | 1 | 122 | 119 | +3 | 3 | Second round |
| 3 | Oman | 2 | 0 | 2 | 127 | 147 | −20 | 2 | Second round |
| 4 | Sri Lanka (Note: Sri Lanka withdrew before the tournament.) | 0 | 0 | 0 | 0 | 0 | 0 | 0 | Withdrew |

Source: FIBA
Rules for classification: 1) Points; 2) Head-to-head results; 3) Points difference; 4) Points scored.
(H) Hosts
Notes:

| 2 June 2022 | Qatar | 73–62 | Oman | Doha |
| 19:00 | Scoring by quarter: 22–10, 17–24, 15–13, 19–15 |
| | Pts: Fouda 23; Rebs: Avdić 7 Asts: three players 5 | Boxscore | Pts: Bakhit 19; Rebs: Al-Souli 7 Asts: Al-Riyami 4 | Arena: Al-Gharafa Sports Club Multi-Purpose Hall; Attendance: 249; Referees: Rabah Noujaim (LBN), Ahmed Al-Shuwaili (IRQ), Hadi Salem (IRN) |

| 3 June 2022 | Oman | 65–74 | United Arab Emirates | Doha |
| 19:00 | Scoring by quarter: 14–24, 21–12, 14–18, 16–20 |
| | Pts: Al Battashi 14; Rebs: Al-Souli 7 Asts: three players 2 | Boxscore | Pts: Alshabebi 27; Rebs: M. Albreiki 10; Asts: Alzaabi, H. Albreiki 5 | Arena: Al-Gharafa Sports Club Multi-Purpose Hall; Attendance: 169; Referees: Rabah Noujaim (LBN), Ahmed Al-Shuwaili (IRQ), Preeda Muongmee (THA) |

| 4 June 2022 | United Arab Emirates | 48–54 | Qatar | Doha |
| 19:00 | Scoring by quarter: 15–15, 12–19, 14–8, 7–12 |
| | Pts: Alzaabi 16; Rebs: Alshabebi 11; Asts: Alshabebi 5 | Boxscore | Pts: Dieng 13; Rebs: Muslić 10; Asts: Ndoye 4 | Arena: Al-Gharafa Sports Club Multi-Purpose Hall; Attendance: 488; Referees: Ahmed Al-Shuwaili (IRQ), Hadi Salem (IRN), Preeda Muongmee (THA) |

==== Group B ====
The tournament was held in Palestine.

| Pos | Team | Pld | W | L | PF | PA | PD | Pts | Qualification |
|---|---|---|---|---|---|---|---|---|---|
| 1 | Palestine (H) | 2 | 2 | 0 | 176 | 159 | +17 | 4 | Second round |
| 2 | Iraq | 2 | 1 | 1 | 172 | 171 | +1 | 3 | Second round |
| 3 | Kuwait | 2 | 0 | 2 | 158 | 176 | −18 | 2 | Second round |
| 4 | Bangladesh (Note: Bangladesh and Uzbekistan withdrew before the start of the competition.) | 0 | 0 | 0 | 0 | 0 | 0 | 0 | Withdrew |
| 5 | Uzbekistan | 0 | 0 | 0 | 0 | 0 | 0 | 0 | Withdrew |

Source: FIBA
Rules for classification: 1) Points; 2) Head-to-head results; 3) Points difference; 4) Points scored.
(H) Hosts
Notes:

| 2 June 2022 | Palestine | 91–81 | Iraq | Jenin |
| 19:00 | Scoring by quarter: 26–25, 14–17, 21–25, 30–14 |
| | Pts: Mayali 27; Rebs: Osayande 13; Asts: Haroon, Mayali 4 | Boxscore | Pts: Abdullah 23; Rebs: Al-Zuhairi 9 Asts: Mayfield 11 | Arena: Arab American University; Attendance: 0 Referees: Yevgeniy Mikheyev (KAZ), Mohammad Taha (JOR), Saif Al-Dossari (QAT) |

| 3 June 2022 | Iraq | 91–80 | Kuwait | Jenin |
| 19:00 | Scoring by quarter: 23–16, 17–21, 27–16, 24–27 |
| | Pts: Abdullah 22; Rebs: Ismael 11; Asts: Mayfield 14 | Boxscore | Pts: Alghais 22; Rebs: Jawhar 11; Asts: Albaloushi, Hasan 6 | Arena: Arab American University; Attendance: 0 Referees: Yevgeniy Mikheyev (KAZ), Mohammad Taha (JOR), Saif Al-Dossari (QAT) |

| 4 June 2022 | Kuwait | 78–85 | Palestine | Jenin |
| 19:00 | Scoring by quarter: 22–20, 17–20, 22–17, 17–28 |
| | Pts: Hasan 19; Rebs: Matwali 7 Asts: Al-Baloushi 4 | Boxscore | Pts: Osayande 22; Rebs: Osayande 13; Asts: Haroon, Mayali 7 | Arena: Arab American University; Attendance: 0 Referees: Yevgeniy Mikheyev (KAZ), Saif Al-Dossari (QAT), Mohammad Taha (JOR) |

==== Group C ====
A four-team tournament was scheduled to be held in Guam. After Hong Kong and Cambodia withdrew before the start of the competition, only one game was planned to be played with both teams advancing to the second round. In October 2022, Hong Kong re-entered the tournament, which was played in India in November 2022.

| Pos | Team | Pld | W | L | PF | PA | PD | Pts | Qualification |
|---|---|---|---|---|---|---|---|---|---|
| 1 | Guam | 2 | 2 | 0 | 149 | 123 | +26 | 4 | Second round |
| 2 | Hong Kong | 2 | 1 | 1 | 138 | 117 | +21 | 3 | Second round |
| 3 | Singapore | 2 | 0 | 2 | 109 | 156 | −47 | 2 | Second round |
| 4 | Cambodia (Note: Cambodia withdrew before the start of the competition.) | 0 | 0 | 0 | 0 | 0 | 0 | 0 | Withdrew |

Source: FIBA
Rules for classification: 1) Points; 2) Head-to-head results; 3) Points difference; 4) Points scored.
Notes:

| 10 November 2022 | Singapore | 59–82 | Guam | Bangalore, India |
| 19:00 | Scoring by quarter: 11–18, 15–16, 10–26, 23–22 |
| | Pts: Ng S. 12; Rebs: Ng S. 9 Asts: Ng J. 5 | Boxscore | Pts: Galloway 23; Rebs: Galloway 12; Asts: Ross 6 | Arena: Kanteerava Indoor Stadium; Attendance: 75; Referees: Ahmed Al-Bulushi (OMA), Imran Baig (IND), Nattapong Jontapa (THA) |

| 11 November 2022 | Guam | 67–64 | Hong Kong | Bangalore, India |
| 19:00 | Scoring by quarter: 19–21, 20–11, 16–10, 12–22 |
| | Pts: Cruz 21; Rebs: Ross 10; Asts: Cruz 5 | Boxscore | Pts: Choi 24; Rebs: Yiu 10; Asts: Yang 6 | Arena: Kanteerava Indoor Stadium; Attendance: 80; Referees: Ahmed Al-Bulushi (OMA), Nattapong Jontapa (THA), Rakesh Ramalingaiah (IND) |

| 12 November 2022 | Hong Kong | 74–50 | Singapore | Bangalore, India |
| 19:30 | Scoring by quarter: 20–0, 22–19, 19–14, 13–17 |
| | Pts: Tsai 20; Rebs: Pok 10; Asts: Tsai 5 | Boxscore | Pts: Ng S. 9 Rebs: Ng J. 8 Asts: Lim 3 | Arena: Kanteerava Indoor Stadium; Attendance: 45; Referees: Ahmed Al-Bulushi (OMA), Rakesh Ramalingaiah (IND), Imran Baig (IND) |

==== Group D ====
The tournament was held in Mongolia.

| Pos | Team | Pld | W | L | PF | PA | PD | Pts | Qualification |
|---|---|---|---|---|---|---|---|---|---|
| 1 | Thailand | 4 | 4 | 0 | 407 | 284 | +123 | 8 | Second round |
| 2 | Mongolia (H) | 4 | 3 | 1 | 378 | 340 | +38 | 7 | Second round |
| 3 | Malaysia | 4 | 2 | 2 | 313 | 315 | −2 | 6 | Second round |
| 4 | Vietnam | 4 | 1 | 3 | 272 | 283 | −11 | 5 | |
| 5 | Tahiti | 4 | 0 | 4 | 211 | 359 | −148 | 4 | |

Source: FIBA
Rules for classification: 1) Points; 2) Head-to-head results; 3) Points difference; 4) Points scored.
(H) Hosts

| 10 November 2022 | Tahiti | 41–84 | Vietnam | Ulaanbaatar |
| 15:30 | Scoring by quarter: 12–17, 12–21, 6–22, 11–24 |
| | Pts: Garbutt 15; Rebs: Roopina 6 Asts: Teamotuaitau 4 | Boxscore | Pts: Nguyễn H. 20; Rebs: Young 11; Asts: Tran 6 | Arena: UG Arena; Attendance: 0 Referees: Takaki Kato (JPN), Park Kyoung-jin (KOR), Yuen Chun Yip (HKG) |

| 10 November 2022 | Malaysia | 78–103 | Thailand | Ulaanbaatar |
| 18:30 | Scoring by quarter: 14–25, 18–25, 21–22, 25–31 |
| | Pts: Wong 19; Rebs: Wong 9 Asts: Heng, Wong 4 | Boxscore | Pts: Lish 29; Rebs: Chanthachon, Morgan 8 Asts: Booddoung, Muangboon 6 | Arena: UG Arena; Attendance: 0 Referees: Lee Kyoung-hwan (KOR), Leong Chuen Wing (SGP), Daigo Urushima (JPN) |

| 11 November 2022 | Thailand | 114–46 | Tahiti | Ulaanbaatar |
| 15:30 | Scoring by quarter: 29–18, 26–9, 28–12, 31–7 |
| | Pts: Jaisanuk 18; Rebs: Boonserm 9 Asts: Booddoung 7 | Boxscore | Pts: Teamotuaitau 10; Rebs: Garbutt 9 Asts: Garbutt 3 | Arena: UG Arena; Attendance: 0 Referees: Yuen Chun Yip (HKG), Lee Kyoung-hwan (KOR), Daigo Urushima (JPN) |

| 11 November 2022 | Mongolia | 94–92 | Malaysia | Ulaanbaatar |
| 18:30 | Scoring by quarter: 20–17, 29–21, 22–27, 23–27 |
| | Pts: Sanchir 36; Rebs: Boldbaatar 12; Asts: Sergelen 6 | Boxscore | Pts: Ting 33; Rebs: Ting 10; Asts: Liew 5 | Arena: UG Arena; Attendance: 0 Referees: Takaki Kato (JPN), Leong Chuen Wing (SGP), Haryanto Sutaryo (INA) |

| 12 November 2022 | Vietnam | 55–81 | Thailand | Ulaanbaatar |
| 15:30 | Scoring by quarter: 18–25, 15–22, 8–17, 14–17 |
| | Pts: Young 13; Rebs: Young 9 Asts: Tran 5 | Boxscore | Pts: Lish 23; Rebs: Muangboon, Towaroj 7 Asts: Muangboon 5 | Arena: UG Arena; Attendance: 0 Referees: Takaki Kato (JPN), Park Kyoung-jin (KOR), Haryanto Sutaryo (INA) |

| 12 November 2022 | Tahiti | 62–91 | Mongolia | Ulaanbaatar |
| 18:30 | Scoring by quarter: 15–24, 19–28, 11–22, 17–17 |
| | Pts: Roopina 14; Rebs: Roopina 8 Asts: Fauura, Lefoc 3 | Boxscore | Pts: Ulzii-Orshikh 18; Rebs: Boldbaatar, Enkhbayasgalan 9 Asts: Boldbaatar 5 | Arena: UG Arena; Attendance: 0 Referees: Lee Kyoung-hwan (KOR), Leong Chuen Wing (SGP), Yuen Chun Yip (HKG) |

| 13 November 2022 | Malaysia | 70–62 | Tahiti | Ulaanbaatar |
| 15:30 | Scoring by quarter: 8–20, 28–19, 22–16, 12–7 |
| | Pts: Wong 27; Rebs: Ong 8 Asts: Ting 5 | Boxscore | Pts: Roopina 14; Rebs: Rouchon 8 Asts: Teamotuaitau 5 | Arena: UG Arena; Attendance: 0 Referees: Takaki Kato (JPN), Yuen Chun Yip (HKG), Park Kyoung-jin (KOR) |

| 13 November 2022 | Mongolia | 88–77 | Vietnam | Ulaanbaatar |
| 18:30 | Scoring by quarter: 21–26, 25–19, 17–12, 25–20 |
| | Pts: Enkhbayasgalan 17; Rebs: Enkhbaatar, Sanchir 7 Asts: Sanchir 6 | Boxscore | Pts: Nguyễn H. 28; Rebs: Nguyễn H., Young 6 Asts: Đặng, Tran 3 | Arena: UG Arena; Attendance: 0 Referees: Leong Chuen Wing (SGP), Daigo Urushima (JPN), Lee Kyoung-hwan (KOR) |

| 14 November 2022 | Vietnam | 56–73 | Malaysia | Ulaanbaatar |
| 15:30 | Scoring by quarter: 9–15, 12–25, 9–16, 26–17 |
| | Pts: Tran, Young 11; Rebs: Nguyễn H. 8 Asts: Tran 5 | Boxscore | Pts: Wong 24; Rebs: three players 8 Asts: Ong, Ting 5 | Arena: UG Arena; Attendance: 0 Referees: Lee Kyoung-hwan (KOR), Daigo Urushima (JPN), Park Kyoung-jin (KOR) |

| 14 November 2022 | Thailand | 109–105 | Mongolia | Ulaanbaatar |
| 18:30 | Scoring by quarter: 23–31, 29–28, 23–11, 34–35 |
| | Pts: Lish 30; Rebs: Lish, Phuangla 5 Asts: Lish 5 | Boxscore | Pts: Sanchir 23; Rebs: Bilguun 9 Asts: Ulzii-Orshikh 5 | Arena: UG Arena; Attendance: 0 Referees: Takaki Kato (JPN), Leong Chuen Wing (SGP), Haryanto Sutaryo (INA) |

=== Second round ===
The 12 qualified teams were divided into two groups of six teams (teams from groups A/B form Group E and teams from groups C/D into Group F). The results against teams that advanced were carried over and the teams played against the teams they did not meet in the first round. The top four teams of each group advanced to the qualifiers. The groups were played in a single venue.

==== Group E ====
The tournament was held in Qatar.

| Pos | Team | Pld | W | L | PF | PA | PD | Pts | Qualification |
|---|---|---|---|---|---|---|---|---|---|
| 1 | Iraq | 5 | 4 | 1 | 411 | 380 | +31 | 9 | Qualifiers |
| 2 | Qatar (H) | 5 | 3 | 2 | 314 | 318 | −4 | 8 (Note: Qatar 2–0; United Arab Emirates 1–1; Palestine 0–2) | Qualifiers |
| 3 | United Arab Emirates | 5 | 3 | 2 | 338 | 319 | +19 | 8 | Qualifiers |
| 4 | Palestine | 5 | 3 | 2 | 364 | 339 | +25 | 8 | Qualifiers |
| 5 | Kuwait | 5 | 2 | 3 | 366 | 351 | +15 | 7 | |
| 6 | Oman | 5 | 0 | 5 | 288 | 374 | −86 | 5 | |

Source: FIBA
Rules for classification: 1) Points; 2) Head-to-head results; 3) Points difference; 4) Points scored.
(H) Hosts
Notes:

| 20 February 2023 | United Arab Emirates | 68–67 | Kuwait | Lusail |
| 14:00 | Scoring by quarter: 16–25, 15–18, 18–11, 19–13 |
| | Pts: Alshabebi 25; Rebs: Alshabebi 11; Asts: H. Albreiki 6 | Boxscore | Pts: Alghais 17; Rebs: Alhadhoud 8 Asts: H. Hasan 5 | Arena: Lusail Multipurpose Hall; Attendance: 6 Referees: Yevgeniy Mikheyev (KAZ), Wissam Zein (SYR), Nattapong Jontapa (THA) |

| 20 February 2023 | Oman | 46–80 | Palestine | Lusail |
| 16:30 | Scoring by quarter: 11–19, 6–24, 8–23, 21–14 |
| | Pts: Ab. Al Battashi, Al-Souli 7 Rebs: Ad. Al Battashi 5 Asts: Al-Riyami 7 | Boxscore | Pts: Osayande 21; Rebs: Mayali 10; Asts: Aburahal 9 | Arena: Lusail Multipurpose Hall; Attendance: 104; Referees: Mohammad Doost (IRN), Mohamed Al-Salam (BHR), Hadi Salem (IRN) |

| 20 February 2023 | Qatar | 70–75 | Iraq | Lusail |
| 19:00 | Scoring by quarter: 20–19, 15–23, 16–11, 19–22 |
| | Pts: Lewis 21; Rebs: Dieng, Lewis 10; Asts: Ndoye 4 | Boxscore | Pts: Mayfield 26; Rebs: Mayfield 12; Asts: Mayfield 6 | Arena: Lusail Multipurpose Hall; Attendance: 500; Referees: Rabah Noujaim (LBN), Mohammad Taha (JOR), Taha Al-Hashedi (YEM) |

| 21 February 2023 | Kuwait | 65–50 | Oman | Lusail |
| 14:00 | Scoring by quarter: 20–13, 17–11, 22–9, 6–17 |
| | Pts: Alhadhoud 17; Rebs: Borhamah 7 Asts: four players 4 | Boxscore | Pts: Ad. Al Battashi 13; Rebs: Ad. Al Battashi 11; Asts: Al-Souli 4 | Arena: Lusail Multipurpose Hall; Attendance: 99; Referees: Mohammad Doost (IRN), Taha Al-Hashedi (YEM), Nattapong Jontapa (THA) |

| 21 February 2023 | Iraq | 82–74 | United Arab Emirates | Lusail |
| 16:30 | Scoring by quarter: 27–13, 14–25, 17–17, 24–19 |
| | Pts: Al-Zuhairi 20; Rebs: Al-Zuhairi 15; Asts: Mayfield 9 | Boxscore | Pts: Alshabebi 24; Rebs: A. Albreiki, Alshabebi 11; Asts: Hussein 6 | Arena: Lusail Multipurpose Hall; Attendance: 65; Referees: Rabah Noujaim (LBN), Wissam Zein (SYR), Hadi Salem (IRN) |

| 21 February 2023 | Palestine | 57–60 | Qatar | Lusail |
| 19:00 | Scoring by quarter: 9–8, 15–17, 21–20, 12–15 |
| | Pts: Osayande 21; Rebs: Osayande 11; Asts: Aburahal 4 | Boxscore | Pts: Lewis 26; Rebs: Haracic 5 Asts: Fouda 6 | Arena: Lusail Multipurpose Hall; Attendance: 499; Referees: Yevgeniy Mikheyev (KAZ), Mohammad Taha (JOR), Mohamed Al-Salam (BHR) |

| 22 February 2023 | Iraq | 82–65 | Oman | Lusail |
| 14:00 | Scoring by quarter: 19–18, 17–10, 29–17, 17–20 |
| | Pts: Mayfield 21; Rebs: Mayfield 10; Asts: Mayfield 7 | Boxscore | Pts: Al-Souli 19; Rebs: Al-Souli 9 Asts: Ab. Al Battashi 6 | Arena: Lusail Multipurpose Hall; Attendance: 99; Referees: Yevgeniy Mikheyev (KAZ), Taha Al-Hashedi (YEM), Nattapong Jontapa (THA) |

| 22 February 2023 | Palestine | 51–74 | United Arab Emirates | Lusail |
| 16:30 | Scoring by quarter: 17–13, 17–25, 9–14, 8–22 |
| | Pts: Mayali 19; Rebs: Osayande 14; Asts: Osayande 3 | Boxscore | Pts: Alshabebi 18; Rebs: Alshabebi 9 Asts: Alzaabi, Alshabebi 3 | Arena: Lusail Multipurpose Hall; Attendance: 169; Referees: Mohammad Doost (IRN), Mohamed Al-Salam (BHR), Hadi Salem (IRN) |

| 22 February 2023 | Kuwait | 76–57 | Qatar | Lusail |
| 19:00 | Scoring by quarter: 25–20, 14–10, 19–12, 18–15 |
| | Pts: M. Hasan 26; Rebs: M. Hasan 10; Asts: H. Hasan 5 | Boxscore | Pts: Lewis 20; Rebs: Dieng 6 Asts: Avdić, Muslić 3 | Arena: Lusail Multipurpose Hall; Attendance: 499; Referees: Rabah Noujaim (LBN), Wissam Zein (SYR), Mohammad Taha (JOR) |

==== Group F ====
The tournament was held in Mongolia.

| Pos | Team | Pld | W | L | PF | PA | PD | Pts | Qualification |
|---|---|---|---|---|---|---|---|---|---|
| 1 | Guam | 5 | 5 | 0 | 381 | 337 | +44 | 10 | Qualifiers |
| 2 | Thailand | 5 | 4 | 1 | 460 | 406 | +54 | 9 | Qualifiers |
| 3 | Mongolia (H) | 5 | 3 | 2 | 429 | 401 | +28 | 8 | Qualifiers |
| 4 | Hong Kong | 5 | 2 | 3 | 366 | 360 | +6 | 7 | Qualifiers |
| 5 | Malaysia | 5 | 1 | 4 | 375 | 412 | −37 | 6 | |
| 6 | Singapore | 5 | 0 | 5 | 287 | 382 | −95 | 5 | |

Source: FIBA
Rules for classification: 1) Points; 2) Head-to-head results; 3) Points difference; 4) Points scored.
(H) Hosts

| 24 February 2023 | Malaysia | 75–69 | Singapore | Ulaanbaatar |
| 14:00 | Scoring by quarter: 14–15, 13–19, 26–21, 22–14 |
| | Pts: Wong Y. 22; Rebs: Kuek 8 Asts: Heng 4 | Boxscore | Pts: Ng S. 17; Rebs: Ng S. 12; Asts: Toh 9 | Arena: UG Arena; Attendance: 0 Referees: Harja Jaladri (INA), Imran Baig (IND), Budi Marfan (INA) |

| 24 February 2023 | Thailand | 69–75 | Guam | Ulaanbaatar |
| 16:30 | Scoring by quarter: 17–17, 21–21, 14–13, 17–24 |
| | Pts: Lish 29; Rebs: Lish, Morgan 7 Asts: Morgan 3 | Boxscore | Pts: Galloway 22; Rebs: Galloway 19; Asts: Cruz, Wesley 4 | Arena: UG Arena; Attendance: 0 Referees: Ahmed Al-Shuwaili (IRQ), Chuang Chih-chun (TPE), Yana Nikogossyan (KAZ) |

| 24 February 2023 | Mongolia | 76–69 | Hong Kong | Ulaanbaatar |
| 19:00 | Scoring by quarter: 27–15, 14–18, 20–18, 15–18 |
| | Pts: Bilguun 16; Rebs: Dölgöön 10; Asts: Sanchir 3 | Boxscore | Pts: Tsai 19; Rebs: Tang 7 Asts: Yang 4 | Arena: UG Arena; Attendance: 0 Referees: Alexey Stepanenko (KAZ), Haryanto Sutaryo (INA), Rakesh Ramalingaiah (IND) |

| 25 February 2023 | Malaysia | 64–75 | Guam | Ulaanbaatar |
| 14:00 | Scoring by quarter: 17–16, 17–17, 13–25, 17–17 |
| | Pts: Ting 24; Rebs: Ting 8 Asts: Kuek 5 | Boxscore | Pts: Ross 22; Rebs: Ross 9 Asts: three players 3 | Arena: UG Arena; Attendance: 0 Referees: Alexey Stepanenko (KAZ), Budi Marfan (INA), Chuang Chih-chun (TPE) |

| 25 February 2023 | Thailand | 101–88 | Hong Kong | Ulaanbaatar |
| 16:30 | Scoring by quarter: 24–22, 23–25, 26–18, 28–23 |
| | Pts: Lamb 36; Rebs: Muangboon 5 Asts: Lish 7 | Boxscore | Pts: M. Leung 18; Rebs: O. Xu 6 Asts: five players 3 | Arena: UG Arena; Attendance: 0 Referees: Harja Jaladri (INA), Yana Nikogossyan (KAZ), Imran Baig (IND) |

| 25 February 2023 | Mongolia | 73–49 | Singapore | Ulaanbaatar |
| 19:00 | Scoring by quarter: 29–8, 22–10, 10–16, 12–15 |
| | Pts: Delgernyam 16; Rebs: Enkhbaatar 14; Asts: Otgonjargal 6 | Boxscore | Pts: Mah 11; Rebs: Lua 9 Asts: Chiam 4 | Arena: UG Arena; Attendance: 0 Referees: Ahmed Al-Shuwaili (IRQ), Rakesh Ramalingaiah (IND), Joenard Garcia (PHI) |

| 26 February 2023 | Hong Kong | 71–66 | Malaysia | Ulaanbaatar |
| 14:00 | Scoring by quarter: 22–15, 24–26, 13–15, 12–10 |
| | Pts: Tsai 15; Rebs: three players 6 Asts: Leung S. 6 | Boxscore | Pts: Wong Y. 18; Rebs: Ting 13; Asts: De, Liew W. 3 | Arena: UG Arena; Attendance: 0 Referees: Ahmed Al-Shuwaili (IRQ), Alexey Stepanenko (KAZ), Imran Baig (IND) |

| 26 February 2023 | Singapore | 60–78 | Thailand | Ulaanbaatar |
| 16:30 | Scoring by quarter: 14–16, 11–26, 19–22, 16–14 |
| | Pts: X. Ng 23; Rebs: Ng S. 15; Asts: Chiam 5 | Boxscore | Pts: Lamb 27; Rebs: Klaewnarong 10; Asts: Lamb 6 | Arena: UG Arena; Attendance: 0 Referees: Yana Nikogossyan (KAZ), Rakesh Ramalingaiah (IND), Joenard Garcia (PHI) |

| 26 February 2023 | Guam | 82–81 | Mongolia | Ulaanbaatar |
| 19:00 | Scoring by quarter: 15–26, 24–17, 26–22, 17–16 |
| | Pts: Galloway 24; Rebs: Galloway 10; Asts: Ross 8 | Boxscore | Pts: Ariunbold 17; Rebs: Onolbaatar 9 Asts: Sergelen, Sanchir 3 | Arena: UG Arena; Attendance: 0 Referees: Harja Jaladri (INA), Chuang Chih-chun (TPE), Budi Marfan (INA) |

== Qualifiers ==
24 teams competed for 16 places at the final tournament. Matches were played over three windows: February 2024, November 2024 and February 2025. They also earned their place for the qualifiers of the 2027 FIBA Basketball World Cup in Qatar alongside Qatar who automatically qualified for the World Cup as host. The top two teams of each group qualified for the final tournament and the six third-placed teams played another qualifying tournament for the final four places.

The draw took place on 19 September 2023.

=== Participating teams ===
| Teams entering the qualifiers (from the 2022 FIBA Asia Cup) | | Teams qualified through the regional pre-qualifiers | |
| West Region | East Region | West Region | East Region |
|---|---|---|---|
| Bahrain; India; Iran; Jordan; Kazakhstan; Lebanon; Saudi Arabia; Syria | Australia; China; Chinese Taipei; Indonesia; Japan; New Zealand; Philippines; South Korea | Iraq; Palestine; Qatar; United Arab Emirates | Guam; Hong Kong; Mongolia; Thailand |

=== Seeding ===
The seeding was announced on 19 September 2023, according to the FIBA rankings. Eight pots were used for the seeding of the 24 qualified teams based on geographical and ranking principles. The first four pots were allocated for teams in the East Region, covering teams from the EABA (East Asia), SEABA (Southeast Asia), and FIBA Oceania (Oceania), and the rest for teams in the West Region which has the WABA (West Asia), GBA (Gulf), CABA (Central Asia), and SABA (South Asia) in its scope. The top seeded teams for each region were allocated in Pot 1 and 5.

East Region
| Pot 1 | Pot 2 | Pot 3 | Pot 4 |
|---|---|---|---|
| Australia (4); New Zealand (21); Japan (26) | China (29); Philippines (38); South Korea (51) | Indonesia (74); Guam (76); Chinese Taipei (78) | Thailand (91); Mongolia (100); Hong Kong (119) |
West Region
| Pot 5 | Pot 6 | Pot 7 | Pot 8 |
| Iran (27); Lebanon (28); Jordan (32) | Saudi Arabia (66); Kazakhstan (68); Bahrain (69) | Syria (71); India (81); Iraq (90) | Palestine (97); United Arab Emirates (103); Qatar (104) |

=== Groups ===
All times are local.

==== Group A ====
| Pos | Team | Pld | W | L | PF | PA | PD | Pts | Qualification |
|---|---|---|---|---|---|---|---|---|---|
| 1 | Australia | 6 | 6 | 0 | 613 | 367 | +246 | 12 | Final tournament |
| 2 | South Korea | 6 | 4 | 2 | 509 | 476 | +33 | 10 | Final tournament |
| 3 | Thailand | 6 | 2 | 4 | 449 | 529 | −80 | 8 | Final qualifying tournament |
| 4 | Indonesia | 6 | 0 | 6 | 377 | 576 | −199 | 6 | |

Source: FIBA
Rules for classification: 1) Points; 2) Head-to-head; 3) Points difference; 4) Points scored.

| 22 February 2024 | Australia | 85–71 | South Korea | Bendigo |
| 16:30 | Scoring by quarter: 14–15, 22–25, 17–17, 32–14 |
| | Pts: Kay 21; Rebs: Kay 12; Asts: Vasiljevic 8 | Boxscore | Pts: Ra 21; Rebs: Ra 14; Asts: Lee J., Oh 5 | Arena: Red Energy Arena; Attendance: 3,917; Referees: Mohammad Doost (IRN), Ryan Jones (NZL), Leong Chuen Wing (SGP) |

| 22 February 2024 | Thailand | 73–56 | Indonesia | Bangkok |
| 19:00 | Scoring by quarter: 17–8, 18–17, 25–10, 13–21 |
| | Pts: Morgan 24; Rebs: Jakrawan 12; Asts: Leelaphipatkul 6 | Boxscore | Pts: Goantara 14; Rebs: Goantara 8 Asts: three players 3 | Arena: Nimibutr Stadium; Attendance: 3,820; Referees: Yuen Chun Yip (HKG), Chuang Chih-chun (TPE), Zhang Xiao (CHN) |

| 25 February 2024 | South Korea | 96–62 | Thailand | Wonju |
| 15:00 | Scoring by quarter: 28–15, 27–16, 17–11, 24–20 |
| | Pts: Ra 15; Rebs: Ha 14; Asts: Oh 6 | Boxscore | Pts: Lish 26; Rebs: Lish 7 Asts: Lish 6 | Arena: Wonju Gymnasium; Attendance: 3,536; Referees: Yuen Chun Yip (HKG), Zhang Xiao (CHN), Chuang Chih-chun (TPE) |

| 25 February 2024 | Indonesia | 51–106 | Australia | Jakarta |
| 20:00 | Scoring by quarter: 12–22, 21–27, 2–22, 16–35 |
| | Pts: Prosper 26; Rebs: Prosper 8 Asts: Saudale 3 | Boxscore | Pts: Humphries 18; Rebs: Bannan, Hunter 8 Asts: Armstrong 9 | Arena: Indonesia Arena; Attendance: 6,059; Referees: Daigo Urushima (JPN), Ryan Jones (NZL), Leong Chuen Wing (SGP) |

| 21 November 2024 | South Korea | 86–78 | Indonesia | Goyang |
| 19:30 | Scoring by quarter: 19–15, 21–25, 18–23, 28–15 |
| | Pts: Byeon, Yu 13; Rebs: Lee H. 11; Asts: Byeon 6 | Boxscore | Pts: Beane 27; Rebs: Beane, Jawato 7 Asts: Saputera 4 | Arena: Goyang Gymnasium; Attendance: 2,189; Referees: Yevgeniy Mikheyev (KAZ), Chuang Chih-chun (TPE), Yana Nikogossyan (KAZ) |

| 21 November 2024 | Thailand | 48–101 | Australia | Bangkok |
| 19:00 | Scoring by quarter: 22–20, 9–30, 9–23, 8–28 |
| | Pts: Lish 11; Rebs: Breunig 8 Asts: Lish 4 | Boxscore | Pts: Goulding 27; Rebs: Henshall 7 Asts: Henshall 8 | Arena: Nimibutr Stadium; Attendance: 5,135; Referees: Yuen Chun Yip (HKG), Daigo Urushima (JPN), Sun Jian (CHN) |

| 24 November 2024 | South Korea | 75–98 | Australia | Goyang |
| 15:00 | Scoring by quarter: 19–19, 13–35, 26–17, 17–27 |
| | Pts: Lee Wo. 17; Rebs: Lee H. 9 Asts: Lee H. 5 | Boxscore | Pts: Goulding 31; Rebs: Kay 12; Asts: Norton 6 | Arena: Goyang Gymnasium; Attendance: 3,892; Referees: Yevgeniy Mikheyev (KAZ), Chuang Chih-chun (TPE), Yana Nikogossyan (KAZ) |

| 24 November 2024 | Indonesia | 71–112 | Thailand | Jakarta |
| 17:00 | Scoring by quarter: 21–26, 21–32, 18–36, 11–18 |
| | Pts: Grahita 23; Rebs: Jawato 10; Asts: Saputera 11 | Boxscore | Pts: Lish 31; Rebs: Breunig 16; Asts: Lish 7 | Arena: Indonesia Arena; Attendance: 5,000; Referees: Yuen Chun Yip (HKG), Daigo Urushima (JPN), Sun Jian (CHN) |

| 20 February 2025 | Thailand | 90–91 | South Korea | Bangkok |
| 19:00 | Scoring by quarter: 23–24, 20–31, 19–17, 28–19 |
| | Pts: Muangboon 22; Rebs: Breunig 10; Asts: Lish 5 | Boxscore | Pts: Ha 19; Rebs: Ha 7 Asts: Oh 5 | Arena: Nimibutr Stadium; Attendance: 5,057; Referees: Chan Owe Shiong (MAS), Yuen Chun Yip (HKG), Imran Baig (IND) |

| 20 February 2025 | Australia | 109–58 | Indonesia | Traralgon |
| 19:35 | Scoring by quarter: 22–4, 28–18, 27–17, 32–19 |
| | Pts: Pepper 18; Rebs: Kay 9 Asts: McCarron 8 | Boxscore | Pts: Prosper 18; Rebs: Prosper 14; Asts: Prosper 6 | Arena: Gippsland Regional Indoor Sports Stadium; Attendance: 1,179; Referees: Ryan Jones (NZL), Chuang Chih-chun (TPE), Martin Davison (NZL) |

| 23 February 2025 | Australia | 114–64 | Thailand | Traralgon |
| 16:30 | Scoring by quarter: 26–18, 30–17, 25–18, 33–11 |
| | Pts: Pepper 24; Rebs: Okwera 9 Asts: White 6 | Boxscore | Pts: Lish 15; Rebs: Ejesu 8 Asts: Jaimsawad 5 | Arena: Gippsland Regional Indoor Sports Stadium; Attendance: 1,988; Referees: Ryan Jones (NZL), Chuang Chih-chun (TPE), Martin Davison (NZL) |

| 23 February 2025 | Indonesia | 63–90 | South Korea | Jakarta |
| 17:00 | Scoring by quarter: 17–24, 7–25, 23–24, 16–17 |
| | Pts: Grahita 13; Rebs: Prosper 10; Asts: Saputera 9 | Boxscore | Pts: Lee Wo. 13; Rebs: Lee Wo. 6 Asts: Moon, Yang J. 5 | Arena: Indonesia Arena; Attendance: 3,400; Referees: Daigo Urushima (JPN), Yuen Chun Yip (HKG), Chan Owe Shiong (MAS) |

==== Group B ====
| Pos | Team | Pld | W | L | PF | PA | PD | Pts | Qualification |
|---|---|---|---|---|---|---|---|---|---|
| 1 | New Zealand | 6 | 5 | 1 | 526 | 396 | +130 | 11 | Final tournament |
| 2 | Philippines | 6 | 4 | 2 | 540 | 438 | +102 | 10 | Final tournament |
| 3 | Chinese Taipei | 6 | 3 | 3 | 461 | 498 | −37 | 9 | Final qualifying tournament |
| 4 | Hong Kong | 6 | 0 | 6 | 356 | 551 | −195 | 6 | |

Source: FIBA
Rules for classification: 1) Points; 2) Head-to-head; 3) Points difference; 4) Points scored.

| 22 February 2024 | Chinese Taipei | 69–89 | New Zealand | Taipei |
| 17:00 | Scoring by quarter: 20–26, 28–23, 13–17, 8–23 |
| | Pts: Liu 20; Rebs: Wang 4 Asts: Hsieh Y., Yu 3 | Boxscore | Pts: Rusbatch 26; Rebs: Timmins 9 Asts: Ngatai, Prewster 5 | Arena: Taipei Heping Basketball Gymnasium; Attendance: 1,949; Referees: Daigo Urushima (JPN), Christopher Reid (AUS), Suebpong Wichaiphin (THA) |

| 22 February 2024 | Hong Kong | 64–94 | Philippines | Hong Kong |
| 20:00 | Scoring by quarter: 15–23, 22–18, 9–30, 18–23 |
| | Pts: Leung 15; Rebs: Yeung 7 Asts: Yang 6 | Boxscore | Pts: Brownlee 16; Rebs: Sotto 15; Asts: Thompson 9 | Arena: Tsuen Wan Sports Centre; Attendance: 1,000; Referees: Scott Beker (AUS), Nattapong Jontapa (THA), Ruben Woolcock (AUS) |

| 25 February 2024 | New Zealand | 88–49 | Hong Kong | Auckland |
| 16:30 | Scoring by quarter: 27–7, 26–19, 15–12, 20–11 |
| | Pts: Harrison 18; Rebs: Timmins 10; Asts: Cameron 4 | Boxscore | Pts: Reid 13; Rebs: Tsoi 6 Asts: Yang 4 | Arena: Eventfinda Stadium; Attendance: 2,072; Referees: Scott Beker (AUS), Mohammad Doost (IRN), Ruben Woolcock (AUS) |

| 25 February 2024 | Philippines | 106–53 | Chinese Taipei | Pasig |
| 19:30 | Scoring by quarter: 26–13, 26–14, 30–14, 24–12 |
| | Pts: Brownlee 26; Rebs: Brownlee 13; Asts: Thompson 9 | Boxscore | Pts: Liu 13; Rebs: Lin Che. 5 Asts: Lin Chu. 5 | Arena: PhilSports Arena; Attendance: 7,812; Referees: Nattapong Jontapa (THA), Christopher Reid (AUS), Suebpong Wichaiphin (THA) |

| 21 November 2024 | Chinese Taipei | 85–55 | Hong Kong | Taipei |
| 19:00 | Scoring by quarter: 23–12, 28–10, 16–12, 18–21 |
| | Pts: Gadiaga 18; Rebs: Gilbeck 13; Asts: Chen 13 | Boxscore | Pts: Xu 11; Rebs: Pok 7 Asts: Xu, Yang 2 | Arena: Taipei Heping Basketball Gymnasium; Attendance: 4,080; Referees: Preeda Muongmee (THA), Budi Marfan (INA), Nattapong Jontapa (THA) |

| 21 November 2024 | Philippines | 93–89 | New Zealand | Pasay |
| 19:30 | Scoring by quarter: 20–22, 25–23, 27–18, 21–26 |
| | Pts: Brownlee 26; Rebs: Brownlee 11; Asts: Sotto 7 | Boxscore | Pts: Webster 25; Rebs: Brown 9 Asts: Britt 13 | Arena: SM Mall of Asia Arena; Attendance: 11,686; Referees: Takaki Kato (JPN), Chuen Wing Leong (SGP), Haruga Iwai (JPN) |

| 24 November 2024 | Philippines | 93–54 | Hong Kong | Pasay |
| 19:30 | Scoring by quarter: 25–16, 20–19, 22–8, 26–11 |
| | Pts: Tamayo 16; Rebs: Sotto 15; Asts: Newsome, Quiambao 4 | Boxscore | Pts: Leung S. 11; Rebs: Yip 8 Asts: Tsai, Yip 3 | Arena: SM Mall of Asia Arena; Attendance: 11,051; Referees: Takaki Kato (JPN), Chuen Wing Leong (SGP), Haruga Iwai (JPN) |

| 25 November 2024 | New Zealand | 81–64 | Chinese Taipei | Christchurch |
| 19:00 | Scoring by quarter: 23–6, 14–26, 15–15, 29–17 |
| | Pts: Waardenburg 16; Rebs: Harris, Waardenburg 13; Asts: Ili 8 | Boxscore | Pts: Gadiaga 14; Rebs: Su 5 Asts: Hu, Lin T. 4 | Arena: Wolfbrook Arena; Attendance: 3,235; Referees: Scott Beker (AUS), Mohammad Doost (IRI), Nicolas Fernandes (AUS) |

| 20 February 2025 | Chinese Taipei | 91–84 | Philippines | Taipei |
| 19:00 | Scoring by quarter: 22–20, 25–25, 24–16, 20–23 |
| | Pts: Lin T. 21; Rebs: Gilbeck 8 Asts: Lin T. 5 | Boxscore | Pts: Brownlee 39; Rebs: Thompson 8 Asts: Brownlee 8 | Arena: Taipei Heping Basketball Gymnasium; Attendance: 3,870; Referees: Takaki Kato (JPN), Budi Marfan (INA), Suebpong Wichaiphin (THA) |

| 20 February 2025 | Hong Kong | 51–92 | New Zealand | Hong Kong |
| 19:00 | Scoring by quarter: 21–26, 12–26, 14–19, 4–21 |
| | Pts: Reid 17; Rebs: Yip 9 Asts: Tsang 5 | Boxscore | Pts: Ngatai 20; Rebs: Wynyard 9 Asts: Brown 7 | Arena: Tsuen Wan Sports Centre; Attendance: 807; Referees: Daigo Urushima (JPN), Nattapong Jontapa (THA), Rakesh Ramalingaiah (IND) |

| 23 February 2025 | New Zealand | 87–70 | Philippines | Auckland |
| 15:00 | Scoring by quarter: 30–15, 23–18, 21–22, 13–15 |
| | Pts: Smith-Milner 25; Rebs: Te Rangi, Smith-Milner 9 Asts: Le'afa 6 | Boxscore | Pts: Newsome 13; Rebs: Edu 15; Asts: Brownlee 3 | Arena: Spark Arena; Attendance: 8,345; Referees: James Boyer (AUS), Mohammad Doost (IRN), James Griguol (AUS) |

| 23 February 2025 | Hong Kong | 83–99 | Chinese Taipei | Hong Kong |
| 19:00 | Scoring by quarter: 17–21, 27–23, 17–25, 22–30 |
| | Pts: Leung S. 18; Rebs: Leung S. 9 Asts: Yang 4 | Boxscore | Pts: Lin S. 21; Rebs: Gilbeck 18; Asts: Chen, Lin T. 4 | Arena: Tsuen Wan Sports Centre; Attendance: 1,043; Referees: Takaki Kato (JPN), Rakesh Ramalingaiah (IND), Suebpong Wichaiphin (THA) |

==== Group C ====
| Pos | Team | Pld | W | L | PF | PA | PD | Pts | Qualification |
|---|---|---|---|---|---|---|---|---|---|
| 1 | China | 6 | 5 | 1 | 530 | 366 | +164 | 11 (Note: China 1–1 Japan (173–134)) | Final tournament |
| 2 | Japan | 6 | 5 | 1 | 476 | 461 | +15 | 11 | Final tournament |
| 3 | Guam | 6 | 1 | 5 | 402 | 484 | −82 | 7 (Note: Guam 1–1 Mongolia (137–137). Teams ranked on overall points difference.) | Final qualifying tournament |
| 4 | Mongolia | 6 | 1 | 5 | 392 | 489 | −97 | 7 | |

Source: FIBA
Rules for classification: 1) Points; 2) Head-to-head; 3) Points difference; 4) Points scored.
Notes:

| 22 February 2024 | Japan | 77–56 | Guam | Tokyo |
| 19:05 | Scoring by quarter: 17–12, 18–24, 20–8, 22–12 |
| | Pts: Kawamura 15; Rebs: Harrellson 21; Asts: Kawamura 6 | Boxscore | Pts: Ross 14; Rebs: Ross 11; Asts: three players 2 | Arena: Ariake Coliseum; Attendance: 8,672; Referees: Harja Jaladri (INA), Park Kyoung-jin (KOR), Glenn Cornelio (PHI) |

| 22 February 2024 | China | 80–49 | Mongolia | Xi'an |
| 19:30 | Scoring by quarter: 20–12, 19–17, 20–7, 21–13 |
| | Pts: Hu 19; Rebs: Hu 9 Asts: Xu 6 | Boxscore | Pts: Bilguun 15; Rebs: Bilguun 6 Asts: Uuganbayar 5 | Arena: Shaanxi Provincial Gymnasium; Attendance: 6,000; Referees: Preeda Muongmee (THA), Lee Kyoung-hwan (KOR), Chan Owe Shiong (MAS) |

| 25 February 2024 | Japan | 76–73 | China | Tokyo |
| 14:00 | Scoring by quarter: 19–20, 19–18, 17–13, 21–22 |
| | Pts: Baba 24; Rebs: Hawkinson 12; Asts: Toews 4 | Boxscore | Pts: Hu 23; Rebs: Hu 12; Asts: Zhao 4 | Arena: Ariake Coliseum; Attendance: 9,191; Referees: Harja Jaladri (INA), Park Kyoung-jin (KOR), Glenn Cornelio (PHI) |

| 25 February 2024 | Mongolia | 63–74 | Guam | Ulaanbaatar |
| 15:00 | Scoring by quarter: 13–21, 19–18, 16–19, 15–16 |
| | Pts: Bilguun 13; Rebs: Bilguun 5 Asts: Ulzii-Orshikh 3 | Boxscore | Pts: Ross 19; Rebs: Galloway 9 Asts: Wesley 4 | Arena: UG Arena; Attendance: 3,600; Referees: Preeda Muongmee (THA), Chan Owe Shiong (MAS), Lee Kyoung-hwan (KOR) |

| 21 November 2024 | Japan | 93–75 | Mongolia | Utsunomiya |
| 19:05 | Scoring by quarter: 22–22, 25–14, 20–15, 26–24 |
| | Pts: Nishida 21; Rebs: Nishida 12; Asts: Sasaki 7 | Boxscore | Pts: Enkhbayasgalan 26; Rebs: Erdenetsogt 7 Asts: Bolor-Erdene 7 | Arena: Nikkan Arena Tochigi; Attendance: 5,295; Referees: Glenn Cornelio (PHI), Lee Kyoung-hwan (KOR), Chan Owe Shiong (MAS) |

| 21 November 2024 | China | 101–53 | Guam | Hefei |
| 19:30 | Scoring by quarter: 21–17, 24–10, 27–15, 29–11 |
| | Pts: Yang 16; Rebs: Zeng 8 Asts: Liao 8 | Boxscore | Pts: Fukuda 14; Rebs: Galloway 7 Asts: Galloway 4 | Arena: Hefei Sports Center; Attendance: 4,220; Referees: Park Kyoung-jin (KOR), Suebpong Wichaiphin (THA), Cheon Kam-jae (KOR) |

| 24 November 2024 | Guam | 78–83 | Japan | Mangilao |
| 15:00 | Scoring by quarter: 15–20, 16–28, 22–20, 25–15 |
| | Pts: Ross 30; Rebs: Ross 10; Asts: Cruz 5 | Boxscore | Pts: Nishida 21; Rebs: Hawkinson 16; Asts: Yoshii 8 | Arena: UOG Calvo Field House; Attendance: 1,128; Referees: Glenn Cornelio (PHI), Lee Kyoung-hwan (KOR), Chan Owe Shiong (MAS) |

| 24 November 2024 | Mongolia | 52–90 | China | Ulaanbaatar |
| 15:00 | Scoring by quarter: 14–18, 15–25, 14–28, 9–19 |
| | Pts: Erdenetsogt 16; Rebs: Bilguun, Erdenetsogt 4 Asts: Ulzii-Orshikh 3 | Boxscore | Pts: Hu 20; Rebs: Liao 9 Asts: Liao 4 | Arena: UG Arena; Attendance: 3,400; Referees: Park Kyoung-jin (KOR), Suebpong Wichaiphin (THA), Cheon Kam-jae (KOR) |

| 20 February 2025 | Guam | 63–74 | Mongolia | Mangilao |
| 19:30 | Scoring by quarter: 19–22, 12–17, 12–20, 20–15 |
| | Pts: Ross 18; Rebs: Wesley 12; Asts: Wesley 6 | Boxscore | Pts: Margad 16; Rebs: Margad 9 Asts: Bolor-Erdene 4 | Arena: UOG Calvo Field House; Attendance: 968; Referees: Glenn Cornelio (PHI), Lee Kyoung-hwan (KOR), Leong Chuen Wing (SGP) |

| 20 February 2025 | China | 100–58 | Japan | Shenzhen |
| 19:30 | Scoring by quarter: 19–12, 31–21, 19–12, 31–13 |
| | Pts: Hu 17; Rebs: Zhu 11; Asts: Zhao 7 | Boxscore | Pts: Sasaki 17; Rebs: Kirk 10; Asts: Tsuya 3 | Arena: Shenzhen Bay Gymnasium; Attendance: 11,738; Referees: Harja Jaladri (INA), Park Kyoung-jin (KOR), Preeda Muongmee (THA) |

| 23 February 2025 | Mongolia | 79–89 | Japan | Ulaanbaatar |
| 13:00 | Scoring by quarter: 22–23, 22–23, 18–21, 17–22 |
| | Pts: Margad 14; Rebs: Enkhbayasgalan, Margad 7 Asts: Bolor-Erdene 8 | Boxscore | Pts: Kirk 24; Rebs: Kirk 17; Asts: Toews 8 | Arena: UG Arena; Attendance: 3,215; Referees: Harja Jaladri (INA), Park Kyoung-jin (KOR), Preeda Muongmee (THA) |

| 23 February 2025 | Guam | 78–86 | China | Mangilao |
| 17:00 | Scoring by quarter: 16–19, 17–25, 23–22, 22–20 |
| | Pts: Wesley 32; Rebs: Ross 11; Asts: Cruz 10 | Boxscore | Pts: Yang 19; Rebs: Yang 9 Asts: Zhao R. 5 | Arena: UOG Calvo Field House; Attendance: 1,276; Referees: Glenn Cornelio (PHI), Lee Kyoung-hwan (KOR), Leong Chuen Wing (SGP) |

==== Group D ====
| Pos | Team | Pld | W | L | PF | PA | PD | Pts | Qualification |
|---|---|---|---|---|---|---|---|---|---|
| 1 | Jordan | 6 | 6 | 0 | 463 | 390 | +73 | 12 | Final tournament |
| 2 | Saudi Arabia (Note: Saudi Arabia was confirmed as the hosts of the 2025 FIBA Asia Cup on 7 December 2023, therefore qualifying for the tournament, regardless of their final placing.) | 6 | 4 | 2 | 428 | 410 | +18 | 10 | Final tournament as the hosts |
| 3 | Iraq | 6 | 2 | 4 | 393 | 407 | −14 | 8 | Final qualifying tournament |
| 4 | Palestine | 6 | 0 | 6 | 395 | 472 | −77 | 6 | |

Source: FIBA
Rules for classification: 1) Points; 2) Head-to-head; 3) Points difference; 4) Points scored.
Notes:

| 23 February 2024 | Iraq | 58–64 | Saudi Arabia | Baghdad |
| 18:00 | Scoring by quarter: 13–17, 16–10, 16–17, 13–20 |
| | Pts: Al-Khafaji 22; Rebs: A. Ismael 10; Asts: Mayfield 5 | Boxscore | Pts: Ma. Al-Marwani 20; Rebs: Al-Suwailem 13; Asts: Ma. Al-Marwani, Al-Muwallad 4 | Arena: Al Shaeb Hall; Attendance: 3,200; Referees: Rabah Noujaim (LBN), Wissam Zein (SYR), Paul Skayem (LBN) |

| 23 February 2024 | Jordan | 73–46 | Palestine | Amman |
| 20:00 | Scoring by quarter: 16–16, 18–10, 25–4, 14–16 |
| | Pts: Al-Dwairi 13; Rebs: Al-Dwairi 13; Asts: Ibrahim 7 | Boxscore | Pts: Mayali 20; Rebs: Godfrey 11; Asts: Mayali 3 | Arena: Prince Hamzah Hall; Attendance: 3,000; Referees: Alexey Stepanenko (KAZ), Budi Marfan (INA), Rakesh Ramalingaiah (IND) |

| 26 February 2024 | Saudi Arabia | 64–79 | Jordan | Jeddah |
| 19:30 | Scoring by quarter: 18–16, 20–23, 11–20, 15–20 |
| | Pts: Al-Suwailem 17; Rebs: Al-Suwailem 9 Asts: Belal 4 | Boxscore | Pts: Ibrahim 24; Rebs: Hollis-Jefferson 8 Asts: Ibrahim 6 | Arena: King Abdullah Sports City; Attendance: 1,200; Referees: Paul Skayem (LBN), Hadi Salem (IRN), Sadegh Ghanbari (IRN) |

| 26 February 2024 | Palestine | 72–75 | Iraq | Amman, Jordan |
| 20:00 | Scoring by quarter: 23–25, 13–12, 17–19, 19–19 |
| | Pts: Mayali 21; Rebs: Sawalha 8 Asts: Mayali 6 | Boxscore | Pts: Mayfield 22; Rebs: Al-Zuhairi 11; Asts: Mayfield 8 | Arena: Prince Hamzah Hall; Attendance: 300; Referees: Alexey Stepanenko (KAZ), Rakesh Ramalingaiah (IND), Budi Marfan (INA) |

| 22 November 2024 | Jordan | 73–64 | Iraq | Amman |
| 19:00 | Scoring by quarter: 23–18, 13–21, 19–7, 18–18 |
| | Pts: Tucker 17; Rebs: Ibrahim 10; Asts: Düverioğlu 4 | Boxscore | Pts: Al-Zuhairi 13; Rebs: Al-Zuhairi 11; Asts: Mayfield 7 | Arena: Prince Hamzah Hall; Attendance: 4,227; Referees: Harja Jaladri (INA), Issam Al-Siyabi (OMA), Rakesh Ramalingaiah (IND) |

| 22 November 2024 | Palestine | 66–73 | Saudi Arabia | Jeddah, Saudi Arabia (Note: Due to the Gaza war, the matches were played at a neutral venue.) |
| 19:45 | Scoring by quarter: 12–16, 16–20, 18–15, 20–22 |
| | Pts: Halums 21; Rebs: Sawalha 8 Asts: Halums, Mayali 4 | Boxscore | Pts: Al-Suwailem 16; Rebs: Mo. Al-Marwani 9 Asts: Abdelgabar, Al-Suwailem 4 | Arena: King Abdullah Sports City; Attendance: 1,148; Referees: Sadegh Ghanbari (IRN), Alexey Stepanenko (KAZ), Sergio Kassab (LBN) |

| 25 November 2024 | Palestine | 81–87 | Jordan | Jeddah, Saudi Arabia |
| 14:45 | Scoring by quarter: 22–24, 12–24, 16–25, 31–14 |
| | Pts: Halums 35; Rebs: Halums 7 Asts: Halums 6 | Boxscore | Pts: Abu Hawwas 23; Rebs: Al-Dwairi 13; Asts: Ibrahim 8 | Arena: King Abdullah Sports City; Attendance: 50; Referees: Alexey Stepanenko (KAZ), Sadegh Ghanbari Damanab (IRI), Sergio Kassab (LBN) |

| 25 November 2024 | Saudi Arabia | 66–58 | Iraq | Jeddah |
| 19:45 | Scoring by quarter: 9–16, 20–20, 16–10, 21–12 |
| | Pts: Al-Muwallad 15; Rebs: Al-Suwailem 13; Asts: Abdel Gabar, Al-Marwani 3 | Boxscore | Pts: Mayfield 18; Rebs: Mayfield 7 Asts: Mayfield 5 | Arena: King Abdullah Sports City; Attendance: 500; Referees: Paul Skayem (LBN), Imran Ali Baig (IND), Rakesh Ramalingaiah (IND) |

| 21 February 2025 | Iraq | 71–59 | Palestine | Baghdad |
| 19:00 | Scoring by quarter: 19–15, 16–29, 12–10, 24–5 |
| | Pts: A. Ismael 21; Rebs: Al-Zuhairi 12; Asts: Mayfield 9 | Boxscore | Pts: Halums 22; Rebs: Halums 10; Asts: Mayali 5 | Arena: Al Shaeb Hall; Attendance: 1,450; Referees: Ahmed Al-Bulushi (OMA), Taha Al-Hashedi (YEM), Issam Al-Siyabi (OMA) |

| 21 February 2025 | Jordan | 78–68 | Saudi Arabia | Amman |
| 19:00 | Scoring by quarter: 31–16, 19–20, 18–10, 10–22 |
| | Pts: Abu Hawwas 22; Rebs: Al-Dwairi 11; Asts: Ibrahim 10 | Boxscore | Pts: Al-Muwallad 22; Rebs: Al-Suwailem 9 Asts: Abdurrahkman 5 | Arena: Prince Hamzah Hall; Attendance: 2,920; Referees: Paul Skayem (LBN), Hadi Salem (IRI), Sergio Kassab (LBN) |

| 24 February 2025 | Iraq | 67–73 | Jordan | Baghdad |
| 19:00 | Scoring by quarter: 29–13, 15–20, 13–18, 10–22 |
| | Pts: Mayfield 30; Rebs: Zewki 8 Asts: Mayfield 6 | Boxscore | Pts: Ibrahim 23; Rebs: Hamarsheh, Tucker 9 Asts: Tucker 6 | Arena: Al Shaeb Hall; Attendance: 1,200; Referees: Ahmed Al-Bulushi (OMA), Taha Al-Hashedi (YEM), Issam Al-Siyabi (OMA) |

| 24 February 2025 | Saudi Arabia | 93–71 | Palestine | Jeddah |
| 19:00 | Scoring by quarter: 25–16, 25–21, 22–21, 21–13 |
| | Pts: Abdurrahkman 23; Rebs: Al-Suwailem 21; Asts: Abdurrahkman 6 | Boxscore | Pts: Halums 26; Rebs: Halums 6 Asts: Halawani, Mayali 2 | Arena: King Abdullah Sports City; Attendance: 950; Referees: Wissam Zein (SYR), Sergio Kassab (LBN), Aryan Jamshidi (IRI) |

==== Group E ====
| Pos | Team | Pld | W | L | PF | PA | PD | Pts | Qualification |
|---|---|---|---|---|---|---|---|---|---|
| 1 | Iran | 6 | 5 | 1 | 453 | 305 | +148 | 11 | Final tournament |
| 2 | Qatar | 6 | 4 | 2 | 462 | 411 | +51 | 10 | Final tournament |
| 3 | India | 6 | 1 | 5 | 360 | 474 | −114 | 7 (Note: India 1–1 Kazakhstan (138–132)) | Final qualifying tournament |
| 4 | Kazakhstan | 6 | 2 | 4 | 321 | 406 | −85 | 7 | |

Source: FIBA
Rules for classification: 1) Points; 2) Head-to-head; 3) Points difference; 4) Points scored.
Notes:

| 23 February 2024 | Iran | 76–74(OT) | Qatar | Tehran |
| 17:00 | Scoring by quarter: 20–13, 15–19, 12–16, 20–19, Overtime: 9–7 |
| | Pts: Yakhchali 20; Rebs: Kazemi, Mirzaei 8 Asts: Mashayekhi 7 | Boxscore | Pts: Dieng 19; Rebs: Dieng 7 Asts: Lewis 8 | Arena: Azadi Basketball Hall; Attendance: 2,000; Referees: Ahmed Al-Shuwaili (IRQ), Taha Al-Hashedi (YEM), Mohamed Al-Salam (BHR) |

| 23 February 2024 | Kazakhstan | 63–50 | India | Astana |
| 20:00 | Scoring by quarter: 13–16, 18–10, 13–7, 19–17 |
| | Pts: Murzagaliyev 18; Rebs: Ivanov 11; Asts: Balashov, Kuanov 4 | Boxscore | Pts: Muthu Krishnan 17; Rebs: Prince 9 Asts: three players 2 | Arena: Saryarka Velodrome; Attendance: 2,353; Referees: Mohammad Taha (JOR), Issam Al-Siyabi (OMA), Mohammed Al-Tarawneh (JOR) |

| 26 February 2024 | India | 53–86 | Iran | New Delhi |
| 18:00 | Scoring by quarter: 20–23, 12–19, 12–25, 9–19 |
| | Pts: Prince 11; Rebs: Prince 6 Asts: Bek Hafeez 3 | Boxscore | Pts: Yakhchali 15; Rebs: three players 9 Asts: Mozafari 5 | Arena: KD Jadhav Indoor Hall; Attendance: 3,102; Referees: Ahmed Al-Bulushi (OMA), Mohamed Al-Salam (BHR), Mohammed Al-Tarawneh (JOR) |

| 26 February 2024 | Qatar | 68–73 | Kazakhstan | Doha |
| 19:00 | Scoring by quarter: 12–19, 25–14, 13–15, 18–25 |
| | Pts: Saad 20; Rebs: Ndoye 8 Asts: Fouda 3 | Boxscore | Pts: Bykov 19; Rebs: Marchuk 10; Asts: Murzagaliyev 5 | Arena: Al-Gharafa Sports Club Multi-Purpose Hall; Attendance: 1,500; Referees: Rabah Noujaim (LBN), Wissam Zein (SYR), Cheon Kam-jae (KOR) |

| 22 November 2024 | India | 53–69 | Qatar | Chennai |
| 18:00 | Scoring by quarter: 14–17, 17–19, 8–14, 14–19 |
| | Pts: Bek Hafeez 17; Rebs: Prince 10; Asts: Dagar 6 | Boxscore | Pts: Harris, Lewis 17; Rebs: Harris 12; Asts: Fouda 5 | Arena: Jawaharlal Nehru Stadium; Attendance: 6,914; Referees: Wissam Zein (SYR), Zhang Xiao (CHN), Mohamed Al-Salam (BHR) |

| 22 November 2024 (Note: Kazakhstan forfeited this match (0 classification points), due to not travelling to Iran.) | Iran | 20–0 | Kazakhstan | Tehran |
| 17:00 |
| | | Boxscore | | Arena: Azadi Basketball Hall |

| 25 November 2024 | India | 88–69 | Kazakhstan | Chennai |
| 18:00 | Scoring by quarter: 9–18, 28–15, 26–18, 25–18 |
| | Pts: Prince, Sandhu 17; Rebs: Hafeez, Poiyamozhi 7 Asts: Prince 7 | Boxscore | Pts: Ivanov 17; Rebs: Ivanov 10; Asts: Murzagaliyev 7 | Arena: Jawaharlal Nehru Stadium; Attendance: 6,125; Referees: Wissam Zein (SYR), Mohamed Hasan Al-Salam (BRN), Zhang Xiao (CHN) |

| 25 November 2024 | Qatar | 78–77(OT) | Iran | Doha |
| 20:00 | Scoring by quarter: 16–14, 15–22, 17–15, 20–17, Overtime: 10–9 |
| | Pts: Lewis 19; Rebs: Ndoye 10; Asts: Fouda 5 | Boxscore | Pts: Aghajanpour 31; Rebs: Kazemi 13; Asts: Vahedi 6 | Arena: Al-Gharafa Sports Club Multi-Purpose Hall; Attendance: 1,500; Referees: Harja Jaladri (INA), Ahmed Ali Yaseen Al-Shuwaili (IRQ), Mohammad Taha (JOR) |

| 21 February 2025 | Iran | 106–55 | India | Tehran |
| 17:00 | Scoring by quarter: 18–15, 28–5, 33–13, 27–22 |
| | Pts: Amini 33; Rebs: Kazemi 10; Asts: Heydari 6 | Boxscore | Pts: A. Singh 18; Rebs: three players 3 Asts: Bek Hafeez 4 | Arena: Azadi Basketball Hall; Attendance: 2,000; Referees: Wissam Zein (SYR), Mohamed Al-Salam (BHR), Ahmad Al-Yousef (JOR) |

| 21 February 2025 | Kazakhstan | 71–92 | Qatar | Astana |
| 20:00 | Scoring by quarter: 13–20, 16–25, 23–29, 19–18 |
| | Pts: Chsherbak 13; Rebs: three players 5 Asts: three players 5 | Boxscore | Pts: Lewis 19; Rebs: Harris 11; Asts: Fouda 6 | Arena: Saryarka Velodrome; Attendance: 3,239; Referees: Rabah Noujaim (LBN), Sun Jian (CHN), Zhang Xiao (CHN) |

| 24 February 2025 | Qatar | 81–61 | India | Doha |
| 18:00 | Scoring by quarter: 17–18, 25–4, 17–19, 22–20 |
| | Pts: Harris 24; Rebs: Harris 7 Asts: Fouda, Grantham 6 | Boxscore | Pts: Hafeez 12; Rebs: Sandhu 6 Asts: Hafeez 6 | Arena: Al-Gharafa Sports Club Multi-Purpose Hall; Attendance: 150; Referees: Ahmed Al-Shuwaili (IRQ), Paul Skayem (LBN), Ahmad Al-Yousef (JOR) |

| 24 February 2025 | Kazakhstan | 45–88 | Iran | Astana |
| 20:00 | Scoring by quarter: 13–25, 7–24, 9–18, 16–21 |
| | Pts: Balashov 12; Rebs: Pan 6 Asts: Balashov 4 | Boxscore | Pts: Vahedi 20; Rebs: Amini 7 Asts: Jafari 5 | Arena: Saryarka Velodrome; Attendance: 1,874; Referees: Rabah Noujaim (LBN), Sun Jian (CHN), Zhang Xiao (CHN) |

==== Group F ====
| Pos | Team | Pld | W | L | PF | PA | PD | Pts | Qualification |
|---|---|---|---|---|---|---|---|---|---|
| 1 | Lebanon | 6 | 6 | 0 | 544 | 448 | +96 | 12 | Final tournament |
| 2 | Syria | 6 | 3 | 3 | 466 | 463 | +3 | 9 | Final tournament |
| 3 | Bahrain | 6 | 2 | 4 | 451 | 492 | −41 | 8 | Final qualifying tournament |
| 4 | United Arab Emirates | 6 | 1 | 5 | 443 | 501 | −58 | 7 | |

Source: FIBA
Rules for classification: 1) Points; 2) Head-to-head; 3) Points difference; 4) Points scored.

| 23 February 2024 | Syria | 78–87 | Lebanon | Damascus |
| 18:00 | Scoring by quarter: 22–28, 14–23, 20–25, 22–11 |
| | Pts: Blake 28; Rebs: Adribe 12; Asts: Atli 7 | Boxscore | Pts: Arakji 19; Rebs: Pelle 7 Asts: Arakji 8 | Arena: Al-Fayhaa Stadium; Attendance: 8,500; Referees: Sadegh Ghanbari (IRI), Anton Kozlov (KAZ), Hadi Salem (IRI) |

| 23 February 2024 | Bahrain | 70–64 | United Arab Emirates | Manama |
| 19:00 | Scoring by quarter: 22–9, 20–21, 9–12, 19–22 |
| | Pts: Rashed 28; Rebs: Chism 12; Asts: Isa 4 | Boxscore | Pts: Hussein 17; Rebs: N'Diaye 10; Asts: Almaazmi 4 | Arena: Khalifa Sports City Stadium; Attendance: 741; Referees: Ahmed Al-Bulushi (OMA), Cheon Kam-jae (KOR), Imran Baig (IND) |

| 26 February 2024 | United Arab Emirates | 63–78 | Syria | Dubai |
| 19:00 | Scoring by quarter: 17–16, 11–26, 12–15, 23–21 |
| | Pts: Alshabebi 14; Rebs: N'Diaye 11; Asts: Alzaabi, Hussein 4 | Boxscore | Pts: Blake 19; Rebs: Adribi, Atli 9 Asts: four players 3 | Arena: Sheikh Saeed Bin Maktoum Sports Hall; Attendance: 1,200; Referees: Mohammad Taha (JOR), Anton Kozlov (KAZ), Imran Baig (IND) |

| 26 February 2024 | Lebanon | 94–63 | Bahrain | Zouk Mikael |
| 21:00 | Scoring by quarter: 21–13, 18–20, 29–13, 26–17 |
| | Pts: Arakji 20; Rebs: Hadidian 11; Asts: Arakji 6 | Boxscore | Pts: Rashed 18; Rebs: Chism 14; Asts: Rashed 7 | Arena: Nouhad Nawfal Sports Complex; Attendance: 3,377; Referees: Ahmed Al-Shuwaili (IRQ), Taha Al-Hashedi (YEM), Issam Al-Siyabi (OMA) |

| 22 November 2024 | United Arab Emirates | 77–99 | Lebanon | Dubai |
| 19:30 | Scoring by quarter: 20–26, 15–22, 19–30, 23–21 |
| | Pts: Alshabebi 19; Rebs: Alshabebi 7 Asts: H. Albreiki 9 | Boxscore | Pts: Spellman 19; Rebs: El Darwch 7 Asts: Arakji 7 | Arena: Sheikh Saeed Bin Maktoum Sports Hall; Attendance: 2,221; Referees: Ahmed Al-Bulushi (OMA), Hadi Salem (IRI), Mohammed Al-Tarawneh (JOR) |

| 22 November 2024 | Bahrain | 76–71 | Syria | Manama |
| 19:00 | Scoring by quarter: 26–16, 22–12, 19–23, 9–20 |
| | Pts: Haji 35; Rebs: Chism 12; Asts: M. Rashed 8 | Boxscore | Pts: Hardy 21; Rebs: Adribi, Atli 6 Asts: Atli 4 | Arena: Khalifa Sports City Stadium; Attendance: 1,500; Referees: Ahmed Al-Shuwaili (IRQ), Imran Baig (IND), Aryan Jamshidi (IRI) |

| 25 November 2024 | Lebanon | 89–64 | Syria | Dubai, United Arab Emirates (Note: Due to the Israeli invasion of Lebanon, the match was played at a neutral venue.) |
| 18:00 | Scoring by quarter: 33–16, 14–18, 18–14, 24–16 |
| | Pts: Spellman 24; Rebs: Spellman 12; Asts: Saoud 7 | Boxscore | Pts: Hardy 26; Rebs: Atli 7 Asts: Hardy 5 | Arena: Sheikh Saeed Bin Maktoum Sports Hall; Attendance: 2,123; Referees: Ahmed Al-Bulushi (OMA), Mohammed Ismail Al-Tarawneh (JOR), Hadi Salem (IRI) |

| 25 November 2024 | United Arab Emirates | 90–77 | Bahrain | Dubai |
| 21:00 | Scoring by quarter: 20–15, 16–19, 32–12, 22–31 |
| | Pts: H. Albreiki 19; Rebs: Dickerson 15; Asts: Dickerson 10 | Boxscore | Pts: M. Rashed 18; Rebs: Chism 18; Asts: Isa 6 | Arena: Sheikh Saeed Bin Maktoum Sports Hall; Attendance: 150; Referees: Issam Al-Siyabi (OMA), Taha Al-Hashedi (YEM), Aryan Jamshidi (IRI) |

| 21 February 2025 | Syria | 86–61 | United Arab Emirates | Doha, Qatar (Note: Due to the Israeli invasion of Syria, the matches were played at a neutral venue.) |
| 19:00 | Scoring by quarter: 21–15, 27–15, 17–12, 21–19 |
| | Pts: Gordon 20; Rebs: Cheikh-Ali 13; Asts: Gordon 6 | Boxscore | Pts: Dickerson 20; Rebs: Alshabebi 12; Asts: Alzaabi 3 | Arena: Al-Gharafa Sports Club Multi-Purpose Hall; Attendance: 1,500; Referees: Yevgeniy Mikheyev (KAZ), Mohammad Taha (JOR), Alexey Stepanenko (KAZ) |

| 21 February 2025 | Bahrain | 78–84 | Lebanon | Manama |
| 19:00 | Scoring by quarter: 15–22, 18–27, 24–19, 21–16 |
| | Pts: M. Rashed 22; Rebs: Chism 12; Asts: Kowaid, Rashed 5 | Boxscore | Pts: Majok 18; Rebs: Arakji 7 Asts: El Darwich 6 | Arena: Khalifa Sports City Stadium; Attendance: 2,645; Referees: Ahmed Al-Shuwaili (IRQ), Sadegh Ghanbari (IRI), Aryan Jamshidi (IRI) |

| 24 February 2025 | Syria | 89–87 | Bahrain | Doha, Qatar |
| 22:00 | Scoring by quarter: 24–15, 22–25, 21–20, 22–27 |
| | Pts: Gordon 27; Rebs: Atli, Gordon 6 Asts: Gordon 7 | Boxscore | Pts: Chism 27; Rebs: Chism 19; Asts: Haji, M. Rashed 4 | Arena: Al-Gharafa Sports Club Multi-Purpose Hall; Attendance: 950; Referees: Yevgeniy Mikheyev (KAZ), Mohammad Taha (JOR), Alexey Stepanenko (KAZ) |

| 24 February 2025 | Lebanon | 91–88 | United Arab Emirates | Zouk Mikael |
| 21:00 | Scoring by quarter: 18–21, 25–16, 24–31, 24–20 |
| | Pts: Arakji 29; Rebs: three players 7 Asts: Saoud 7 | Boxscore | Pts: Dickerson 25; Rebs: Alshabebi 9 Asts: H. Albreiki 11 | Arena: Nouhad Nawfal Sports Complex; Attendance: 2,100; Referees: Sadegh Ghanbari (IRI), Mohammed Al-Tarawneh (JOR), Hadi Salem (IRI) |

== Final qualifying tournament ==
The six third-placed teams from the qualifiers played for the final four places at the final tournament. The tournaments were played between 19 and 23 March 2025.

=== Eastern Region Final Qualifying Tournament ===
==== Group G ====
| Pos | Team | Pld | W | L | PF | PA | PD | Pts | Qualification |
|---|---|---|---|---|---|---|---|---|---|
| 1 | Chinese Taipei (H) | 2 | 2 | 0 | 235 | 133 | +102 | 4 | Final tournament |
| 2 | Guam | 2 | 1 | 1 | 162 | 194 | −32 | 3 | Final tournament |
| 3 | Thailand | 2 | 0 | 2 | 141 | 211 | −70 | 2 | |

Source: FIBA
Rules for classification: 1) Points; 2) Head-to-head; 3) Points difference; 4) Points scored.
(H) Hosts

| 19 March 2025 | Chinese Taipei | 113–73 | Guam | Taipei |
| 19:00 | Scoring by quarter: 29–19, 25–19, 37–14, 22–21 |
| | Pts: Gadiaga 23; Rebs: Gilbeck 13; Asts: Chen 6 | Boxscore | Pts: Ross 22; Rebs: Ross 7 Asts: Cruz, Johnson 3 | Arena: University of Taipei Tianmu Gymnasium; Attendance: 3,328; Referees: Takaki Kato (JPN), Glenn Cornelio (PHI), Leong Chuen Wing (SGP) |

| 20 March 2025 | Guam | 89–81 | Thailand | Taipei |
| 19:00 | Scoring by quarter: 22–21, 26–17, 24–19, 17–24 |
| | Pts: Cruz 21; Rebs: Ross 9 Asts: Cruz 8 | Boxscore | Pts: Lish 20; Rebs: Jakrawan 12; Asts: Klahan, Muangboon 3 | Arena: University of Taipei Tianmu Gymnasium; Attendance: 85; Referees: Harja Jaladri (INA), Takaki Kato (JPN), Leong Chuen Wing (SGP) |

| 21 March 2025 | Thailand | 60–122 | Chinese Taipei | Taipei |
| 19:00 | Scoring by quarter: 12–29, 18–30, 13–32, 17–31 |
| | Pts: Ejesu 19; Rebs: Ejesu 13; Asts: Jaimsawad 3 | Boxscore | Pts: Ma 20; Rebs: Gilbeck 15; Asts: Chen 10 | Arena: University of Taipei Tianmu Gymnasium; Attendance: 3,594; Referees: Takaki Kato (JPN), Harja Jaladri (INA), Glenn Cornelio (PHI) |

=== Western Region Final Qualifying Tournament ===
==== Group H ====
| Pos | Team | Pld | W | L | PF | PA | PD | Pts | Qualification |
|---|---|---|---|---|---|---|---|---|---|
| 1 | India | 2 | 2 | 0 | 178 | 154 | +24 | 4 | Final tournament |
| 2 | Iraq | 2 | 1 | 1 | 162 | 169 | −7 | 3 | Final tournament |
| 3 | Bahrain (H) | 2 | 0 | 2 | 149 | 166 | −17 | 2 | |

Source: FIBA
Rules for classification: 1) Points; 2) Head-to-head; 3) Points difference; 4) Points scored.
(H) Hosts

| 21 March 2025 | Iraq | 77–97 | India | Manama |
| 22:00 | Scoring by quarter: 30–30, 8–14, 19–32, 20–21 |
| | Pts: Al-Khafaji, Mayfield 20; Rebs: Al-Zuhairi 11; Asts: Mayfield 7 | Boxscore | Pts: Bek Hafeez 17; Rebs: Prince 9 Asts: Dagar 7 | Arena: Khalifa Sports City Stadium; Referees: Rabah Noujaim (LBN), Paul Skayem (LBN), Ahmad Al-Yousef (JOR) |

| 22 March 2025 | India | 81–77 | Bahrain | Manama |
| 22:00 | Scoring by quarter: 25–20, 14–16, 23–17, 19–24 |
| | Pts: Dagar 28; Rebs: Palpreet 16; Asts: Hafeez 5 | Boxscore | Pts: Rashed 30; Rebs: Chism 10; Asts: Rashed 7 | Arena: Khalifa Sports City Stadium; Attendance: 400; Referees: Rabah Noujaim (LBN), Preeda Muongmee (THA), Ahmad Al-Yousef (JOR) |

| 23 March 2025 | Bahrain | 72–85 | Iraq | Manama |
| 22:00 | Scoring by quarter: 22–30, 13–23, 25–18, 12–14 |
| | Pts: Al-Derazi 19; Rebs: Juma 10; Asts: Rashed 6 | Boxscore | Pts: three players 16; Rebs: Mayfield 11; Asts: Mayfield 10 | Arena: Khalifa Sports City Stadium; Attendance: 180; Referees: Rabah Noujaim (LBN), Preeda Muongmee (THA), Paul Skayem (LBN) |

== Qualified teams ==
| Team | Qualification method | Date of qualification | Appearance(s) | | | | Previous best performance (Note: Bold text indicates they hosted that edition.) | WR (Note: World ranking at start of tournament.) |
| Team | Qualification method | Date of qualification | Total | First | Last | Streak | Previous best performance | WR |
|---|---|---|---|---|---|---|---|---|
| Saudi Arabia | Host nation | 7 December 2023 | 10th | 1989 | 2022 | 2 | Third place (1999) | 65 |
| Australia | Group A top two | 24 November 2024 | 3rd | 2017 | 2022 | 3 | Champions (2017, 2022) | 7 |
| Japan | Group C top two | 24 November 2024 | 30th | 1960 | 2022 | 29 | Champions (1965, 1971) | 21 |
| Philippines | Group B top two | 25 November 2024 | 29th | 1960 | 2022 | 8 | Champions (1960, 1963, 1967, 1973, 1985) | 34 |
| New Zealand | Group B top two | 25 November 2024 | 3rd | 2017 | 2022 | 3 | Third place (2022) | 22 |
| Lebanon | Group F top two | 25 November 2024 | 11th | 1999 | 2022 | 4 | Runners-up (2001, 2005, 2007, 2022) | 29 |
| Jordan | Group D top two | 25 November 2024 | 17th | 1983 | 2022 | 10 | Runners-up (2011) | 35 |
| South Korea | Group A top two | 20 February 2025 | 31st | 1960 | 2022 | 31 | Champions (1969, 1997) | 53 |
| China | Group C top two | 20 February 2025 | 24th | 1975 | 2022 | 24 | Champions (Sixteen times) (Note: China has won in 1975, 1977, 1979, 1981, 1983, 1987, 1989, 1991, 1993, 1995, 1999, 2001, 2003, 2005, 2011, and 2015.) | 30 |
| Iran | Group E top two | 21 February 2025 | 19th | 1973 | 2022 | 10 | Champions (2007, 2009, 2013) | 28 |
| Qatar | Group E top two | 21 February 2025 | 11th | 1991 | 2017 | 1 | Third place (2003, 2005) | 87 |
| Syria | Group F top two | 24 February 2025 | 8th | 1999 | 2022 | 3 | Fourth place (2001) | 71 |
| Chinese Taipei | Group G top two | 21 March 2025 | 26th | 1960 | 2022 | 19 | Runners-up (1960, 1963) | 75 |
| Guam | Group G top two | 21 March 2025 | 1st | Debut | | | | 91 |
| India | Group H top two | 22 March 2025 | 27th | 1965 | 2022 | 11 | Fourth place (1975) | 81 |
| Iraq | Group H top two | 23 March 2025 | 5th | 1977 | 2017 | 1 | Sixth place (1977) | 93 |
