= Abibou Toure =

Senegalese basketball player

No. 1 – Toyoda Gosei Scorpions
- Position: Center
- League: B.League

Personal information
- Born: October 11, 1990 (age 36) Senegal
- Listed height: 6 ft 7 in (2.01 m)
- Listed weight: 212 lb (96 kg)

Career information
- High school: Okayama Gakugeikan (Okayama, Okayama)
- College: Hakuoh University
- NBA draft: 2012: undrafted
- Playing career: 2012–present

Career history
- 2013-2014: Renova Kagoshima
- 2014-present: Toyoda Gosei Scorpions

Abibou Toure (born October 11, 1990) is a Senegalese professional basketball player for Toyoda Gosei Scorpions in Japan.
