= Earnest Ross =

American basketball player (born 1991)

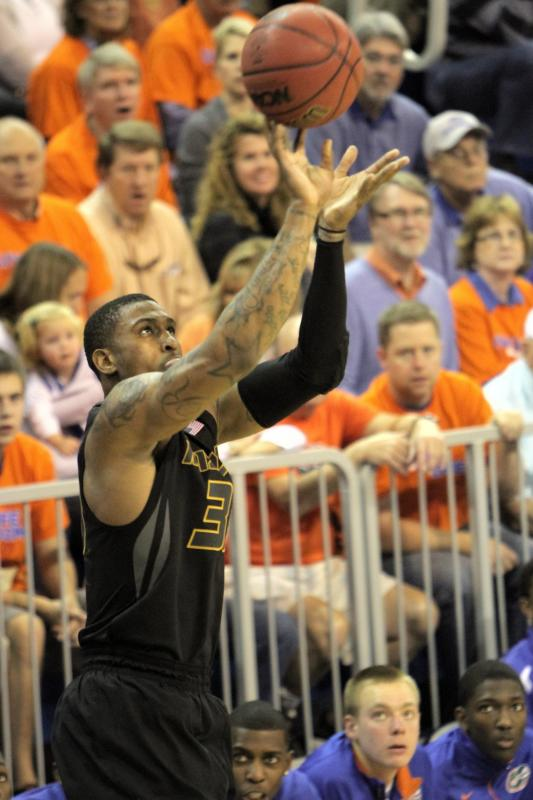
- Ross with the Missouri Tigers in 2013

No. 33 – Penang Sunrise Youngsters
- Position: Shooting guard / small forward
- League: Major Basketball League Malaysia

Personal information
- Born: January 27, 1991 (age 35) Guam
- Listed height: 6 ft 6 in (198 cm)
- Listed weight: 225 lb (102 kg)

Career information
- High school: Panther Creek (Cary, North Carolina)
- College: Auburn (2009–2011); Missouri (2012–2014)
- NBA draft: 2014: undrafted
- Playing career: 2014–present

Career history
- 2014–2015: Perth Wildcats
- 2016: Ballarat Miners
- 2016–2017: Team FOG Næstved
- 2017: Super City Rangers
- 2017–2018: Al Wakrah
- 2018: Geraldton Buccaneers
- 2018–2019: Al Ahli Doha
- 2019: Joondalup Wolves
- 2019: South Bay Lakers
- 2021: West Adelaide Bearcats
- 2021–2022: Yokohama Excellence
- 2022–2024: Toyoda Gosei Scorpions
- 2024: SG Apes
- 2025: Taoyuan Taiwan Beer Leopards
- 2025–2026: Sunshine Coast Phoenix
- 2025–2026: Shonan United
- 2026–present: Penang Sunrise Youngsters

Career highlights
- Danish Cup winner (2017); NBL1 North All Star Second Team (2025)

Earnest Lee Ross Jr. (born January 27, 1991) is an American professional basketball player for the Penang Sunrise Youngsters of the Major Basketball League Malaysia. Born in the U.S. territory of Guam, he represents the Guam national team in international competition. He played college basketball for Auburn and Missouri before beginning his professional career in Australia in 2014. He went on to play in Denmark, New Zealand, Qatar, the NBA G League, Japan, and Mongolia.

== Early life ==
Ross was born in Guam, a United States territory in Micronesia, while his parents served in the military. The family relocated frequently, moving to Hawaii and Japan before his parents divorced when he was 5. His mother, Toy, left the military in 1996 after 15 years, citing long shifts that kept her away from her children. Ross' brother, Jamel, is two years younger. Toy moved the family to Washington, but struggled to find stable work, sending her sons to live with their father in Texas and Maryland during the summers. At age 8, Ross and his family moved to Chicago, initially staying with Toy's sister for a year and a half before securing their own apartment. Despite Toy working multiple jobs, they lived in a tough neighborhood and were eventually evicted, moving in with Toy's mother. Ross and Jamel attended separate schools on Chicago's South Side, with Ross acting as his brother's guardian, cooking meals and walking him to and from school.

At age 12, Ross and his brother moved from Chicago to Washington, D.C., to live with their father due to their mother's financial struggles. She reached an agreement with her ex-husband for the children to stay with him for a year and a half, allowing her time to regain stability. Afterward, she moved to North Carolina, where her sons would eventually join her and attend high school.

Ross attended Panther Creek High School in Cary, North Carolina. As a junior in 2007–08, he earned All-State Class 4A honors after averaging 26 points, eight rebounds and five assists per game. On November 13, 2008, Ross signed a National Letter of Intent to play college basketball for Auburn University. As a senior at Panther Creek in 2008–09, Ross earned All-State Class 4A honors for the second straight year and was named the Tri-Eight Conference Player of the Year after averaging 21 points, six rebounds and five assists. He was also the leading scorer in the North Carolina vs. South Carolina All-Star Game with 16 points and had a team-high 10 rebounds.

== College career ==
=== Auburn (2009–2011) ===
As a freshman at Auburn in 2009–10, Ross averaged 2.8 points and 3.0 rebounds in 13.4 minutes per game. He shot 28 percent from the field, 22 percent from three-point range and 64 percent from the foul line. He also started eight of 32 games, including the first seven games of the season in place of the injured Tay Waller, becoming the first Auburn freshman to start a season opener since Quantez Robertson, Josh Dollard and Joey Cameron started the 2005–06 season opener.

As a sophomore in 2010–11, Ross was the SEC's most-improved scorer, elevating his point production from 2.8 per game to 13.1 per game. He led the Tigers in scoring 13 times, including a career-high 30 points on 5-of-7 three-point shooting in an overtime loss to Georgia. He also led Auburn in rebounding 14 times, including a career-high 13 boards against Alabama on January 22, 2011. He was subsequently named Auburn's Most Valuable Player for the 2010–11 season. In 31 games (27 starts), he also averaged 6.6 rebounds, 2.1 assists and 1.4 steals in 31.8 minutes per game.

=== Missouri (2011–2014) ===
On May 25, 2011, it was announced that Ross was leaving Auburn. On June 21, 2011, he signed a grant-in-aid agreement with the University of Missouri and subsequently redshirted the 2011–12 season due to NCAA transfer regulations.

As a redshirted junior at Missouri in 2012–13, Ross averaged 10.3 points, 5.0 rebounds, 1.1 assists and 1.2 steals in 34 games with 10 starts. He was the top scorer in the Southeastern Conference off the bench, averaging 11.0 points on 44 percent shooting from the floor and 41.7 percent shooting from three-point range in 24 contests off the pine.

As a senior in 2013–14, Ross made starts in all 35 contests and averaged 14.0 points, 6.0 rebounds, 1.4 assists and 1.3 steals. He reached double figures 27 times, including seven 20-point efforts. He scored a season-high 28 points against Nevada on November 29, 2013.

=== College statistics ===
Year	Team	GP	GS	MPG	FG%	3P%	FT%	RPG	APG	SPG	BPG	PPG
2009–10	Auburn	32	8	13.4	.284	.221	.636	3.0	.8	.8	.2	2.8
2010–11	Auburn	31	27	31.8	.389	.333	.793	6.6	2.1	1.4	.3	13.1
2012–13	Missouri	34	10	25.3	.413	.377	.708	5.0	1.1	1.2	.2	10.3
2013–14	Missouri	35	35	31.9	.411	.311	.776	6.0	1.4	1.3	.4	14.0
Career		132	80	25.7	.392	.322	.760	5.2	1.3	1.2	.3	10.1

== Professional career ==
=== NBA workouts ===
After graduating from college, Ross attended a mini-combine run by the Los Angeles Clippers and worked out with the Washington Wizards, Minnesota Timberwolves and Houston Rockets.

=== Perth Wildcats (2014–2015) ===
On September 10, 2014, Ross signed a three-year deal with the Perth Wildcats of the National Basketball League (NBL). His three-year contract included team and player options at the end of each year. As Ross was born in Guam, part of the FIBA Oceania region that includes Australia, he was signed as a domestic player — meaning he was worth three points under the NBL's player points cap system as a returning college player. The Wildcats were impressed with his NBA-ready body and his 208 cm wingspan. Listed at 105 kg, the team looked at trimming some of his weight before the start of the season, after he arrived in Perth at 120 kg.

Ross went scoreless over the first two games of the season before scoring seven points on 1-of-5 shooting and 5-of-5 free throws on October 24 against the Sydney Kings. In his fourth game for the Wildcats, on October 31 against the Wollongong Hawks, Ross scored a season-high 13 points. His only other double-digit game of the season came on December 18 against the Kings, as he scored 10 points to go with a season-high eight rebounds. On January 9, 2015, after less than 30 seconds on the court, Ross suffered a season-ending Achilles injury late in the first quarter of the Wildcats' 91–76 loss to the Cairns Taipans in Cairns. He opted to undergo surgery three days later. As a result, the Wildcats cut Ross from the roster on May 14, 2015. In 18 games for the Wildcats, he averaged 3.3 points and 2.3 rebounds per game.

=== Ballarat Miners (2016) ===
After attempting to join the ranks of the NBA Development League in November 2015, Ross signed with the Ballarat Miners of the South East Australian Basketball League (SEABL) on December 15, 2015.

In the Miners' season opener on April 1, 2016, Ross scored 14 points with three 3-pointers in a 93–68 loss to the Bendigo Braves. In the team's second game of the season on April 8, Ross recorded game highs of 27 points and six steals in a 97–79 win over the BA Centre of Excellence. The next day, he scored a season-high 33 points to go with 12 rebounds in a 105–100 win over the Canberra Gunners. On April 23, he had his second 30-point game of the season, finishing with 31 points in a 95–92 loss to the NW Tasmania Thunder. On May 14, he recorded 26 points (9/15 FG, 6/10 3PT), 10 rebounds, six assists and three steals in 94–92 win over the Dandenong Rangers. He subsequently earned SEABL Player of the Week honors for Round 7. On May 29, he recorded a triple-double with 19 points, 14 rebounds and 11 assists in a 99–76 win over the Frankston Blues. He subsequently earned Player of the Week honors for Round 9. On June 4, he recorded a season-high 19 rebounds to go with 19 points and eight assists in a 93–85 win over the Hobart Chargers. On July 16, he recorded his second triple-double of the season with 26 points, 10 rebounds and 13 assists in a 112–101 loss to the Brisbane Spartans. The Miners missed a playoff berth in 2016 with an 11–13 record. In 22 games for the Miners, Ross averaged 19.9 points, 7.9 rebounds, 5.0 assists and 2.1 steals per game.

=== Team FOG Næstved (2016–2017) ===
On November 21, 2016, Ross signed with Team FOG Næstved of the Danish Basketligaen for the rest of the 2016–17 season. In his second game for Næstved on December 1, Ross recorded 16 points and 13 rebounds in a 78–76 loss to the Bakken Bears. On December 18, 2016, he scored a season-high 28 points in a 117–82 win over SISU BK. In January 2017, he helped Næstved win the Danish Cup, as they garnered an 81–80 win over Horsens IC in the final. Næstved finished the regular season in fourth place with a 13–15 record and went on to lose to Svendborg Rabbits in the quarter-finals in a 3–0 sweep. In 23 games for Næstved, Ross averaged 14.7 points, 6.4 rebounds, 1.7 assists and 1.6 steals per game.

=== Super City Rangers (2017) ===
Following his final game with Næstved on March 27, 2017, Ross left Denmark and travelled to New Zealand, landing in Auckland on March 31 to join the Super City Rangers for the rest of the 2017 New Zealand NBL season. He made his debut for the Rangers on April 8, scoring 16 points off the bench in a 100–73 loss to the Southland Sharks. Seven days later, he recorded game highs of 32 points and 10 rebounds in a 99–87 win over the Nelson Giants. In the Rangers' regular season finale on June 10, Ross scored a game-high 25 points in a 102–82 win over the Canterbury Rams. The Rangers finished the regular season in third place with an 11–7 record, and lost to the second-seeded Southland Sharks 106–67 in their semi-final match-up. Ross scored 10 points in the loss. In 15 games for the Rangers, he averaged 19.1 points, 5.8 rebounds, 1.6 assists and 1.5 steals per game.

=== Al Wakrah (2017–2018) ===
In November 2017, Ross joined Al Wakrah of the Qatari Basketball League. He helped Al Wakrah finish the regular season in fourth place with a 10–6 record and helped them reach the Qatari League final, where they were defeated 61–59 by Al Arabi. Ross appeared in all 19 games for the team, averaging 19.9 points, 8.7 rebounds, 3.0 assists and 1.8 steals per game.

=== Geraldton Buccaneers (2018) ===
On January 30, 2018, Ross signed with the Geraldton Buccaneers of the State Basketball League (SBL) for the 2018 season. In his debut for the Buccaneers on May 5, 2018, Ross recorded 18 points, 15 rebounds and eight assists in an 88–82 win over the Stirling Senators. On June 4, he competed in the SBL All-Star Game for the North All-Stars, coming off the bench to record 13 points, eight rebounds and six assists in a 123–110 win over the South All-Stars. Five days later, he scored 30 points in a 90–80 win over the Perth Redbacks. On July 7, he scored 26 points in a 109–104 win over the Cockburn Cougars. The following day, he scored 29 points in a 103–94 win over the Lakeside Lightning. He subsequently earned Player of the Week honors for Round 17. Ross helped the Buccaneers finish the regular season as minor premiers with a 23–3 record. They went on to lose in a quarter-final sweep to the eighth-seeded Rockingham Flames despite Ross' game-high 34 points in game two. In 20 games, he averaged 20.6 points, 7.1 rebounds, 4.0 assists and 1.9 steals per game.

=== Al Ahli (2018–2019) ===
In December 2018, Ross joined Al Ahli of the Qatari Basketball League, returning to the country for a second stint. He appeared in all 16 games for the team, averaging 18.6 points, 7.4 rebounds, 3.6 assists and 2.4 steals per game.

=== Joondalup Wolves (2019) ===
Ross joined the Joondalup Wolves for the 2019 SBL season. In his debut for the Wolves on March 15, 2019, Ross recorded game highs of 25 points and eight assists in a 112–76 season-opening win over the Perry Lakes Hawks. A day later, he recorded 25 points and a game-high 15 rebounds in a 91–83 win over the Goldfields Giants. On April 14, he scored 33 points in a 102–79 win over the Kalamunda Eastern Suns. On April 18, he had 33 points and 11 rebounds in a 98–92 loss to the Rockingham Flames. On June 1, he suffered a back injury after taking a hard fall in the opening minutes of the Wolves' 115–55 win over the South West Slammers. He went on to lead the Wolves to the minor premiership with a 20–6 record, with the team going on to reach the SBL Grand Final. In the grand final, the Wolves lost 92–80 to the Geraldton Buccaneers despite Ross' 16 points and 12 rebounds. In 30 games, he averaged 19.47 points, 8.07 rebounds and 4.2 assists per game.

=== South Bay Lakers (2019) ===
On October 26, 2019, after a successful try-out, Ross was added to the training camp roster of the South Bay Lakers of the NBA G League. He went on to make the opening night roster on November 4. He was waived on December 3 after averaging 1.8 points and 1.3 rebounds in four games.

=== West Adelaide Bearcats (2021) ===
On March 12, 2021, Ross signed with the West Adelaide Bearcats of the NBL1 Central for the 2021 NBL1 season. In his debut for the Bearcats on April 10, he scored 21 points in an 83–76 loss to the Central Districts Lions. On April 23, he recorded 35 points and 16 rebounds in a 91–84 win over the Norwood Flames. On May 8, he recorded 22 points, 15 rebounds and 10 assists in a 110–69 win over the Eastern Mavericks. On May 29, he recorded 32 points, 19 rebounds and seven assists in a 93–90 loss to the Forestville Eagles. In 18 games, he averaged 19.11 points, 11.05 rebounds and 3.16 assists per game.

=== Yokohama Excellence (2021–2022) ===
On July 30, 2021, Ross signed with Yokohama Excellence of the Japanese B.League third division. In 44 games during the 2021–22 season, he averaged 13.5 points, 7.8 rebounds, 2.1 assists and 1.4 steals per game.

=== Toyoda Gosei Scorpions (2022–2024) ===
On July 12, 2022, Ross signed with Toyoda Gosei Scorpions of the Japanese B.League third division. In 47 games during the 2022–23 season, he averaged 17.5 points, 8.4 rebounds, 2.6 assists and 1.8 steals per game.

On June 22, 2023, Ross re-signed with Toyoda Gosei Scorpions for the 2023–24 season.

=== SG Apes (2024) ===
In October 2024, Ross joined the SG Apes of The League in Mongolia. He played in nine games for Apes between October 14 and December 12, averaging 14.6 points, 10.2 rebounds, 3.4 assists and 1.7 steals per game.

=== Taoyuan Taiwan Beer Leopards (2025) ===
On January 21, 2025, Ross signed with the Taoyuan Taiwan Beer Leopards of the Taiwan Professional Basketball League (TPBL). His contract was terminated on March 21, 2025.

=== Sunshine Coast Phoenix and Shonan United (2025–2026) ===
In April 2025, Ross joined the Sunshine Coast Phoenix of the NBL1 North for the 2025 season. He was named NBL1 North All Star Second Team.

On July 31, 2025, Ross signed with Shonan United of the B.League.

In May 2026, Ross re-joined the Sunshine Coast Phoenix for the 2026 NBL1 North season.

=== Penang Sunrise Youngsters (2026–present) ===
In November 2026, Ross joined the Penang Sunrise Youngsters of the Major Basketball League Malaysia.

== National team career ==
In November 2018, Ross played for the Guam national team in the 2021 FIBA Asia Cup pre-qualifiers, helping Guam go undefeated. In February 2020, he played for Guam in the 2021 FIBA Asia Cup qualifiers.

In February 2023, Ross helped Guam qualify for the 2025 FIBA Asia Cup qualifiers. In 2024, he played in two FIBA Asia Cup qualifying windows. The following year, he played at the 2025 FIBA Asia Cup.

On July 3, 2026, Ross played for Guam in Perth against Australia in a FIBA World Cup qualifier, scoring an equal game-high 22 points in a 124–52 loss. It marked Guam's first ever FIBA World Cup Qualifier.

== Personal life ==
Ross is the son of Earnest Ross Sr. and Toy Miller. His father has remarried twice, and as of March 2013, he was still active in the military. His father's cousin is former NBA player Gerald Glass.

Ross has an Australian wife and daughter. He met his wife in Melbourne.

Ross is a Christian. He has more than 20 tattoos.
