= Masao Kuda =

Japanese basketball player and coach

Masao Kuda 玖田 将夫
Veertien Mie Basketball
- Position: Head coach
- League: B.League

Personal information
- Born: June 9, 1978 (age 48) Osaka Prefecture
- Listed height: 6 ft 2 in (1.88 m)
- Listed weight: 194 lb (88 kg)

Career information
- College: Doshisha University
- Coaching career: 2012–present

Career history

Playing
- 2002-2012: Toyoda Gosei Scorpions

Coaching
- 2012-2013: Toyoda Gosei Scorpions (asst.)
- 2013-2021: Toyoda Gosei Scorpions
- 2022-present: Veertien Mie Basketball

Masao Kuda (玖田 将夫, Kuda Masao) is the head coach of the Veertien Mie Basketball in the Japanese B.League.

== Head coaching record ==
Legend
| Regular season | G | Games coached | W | Games won | L | Games lost | W–L % | Win–loss % |
| Playoffs | PG | Playoff games | PW | Playoff wins | PL | Playoff losses | PW–L % | Playoff win–loss % |

| Team | Year | G | W | L | W–L% | Finish | PG | PW | PL | PW–L% | Result |
|---|---|---|---|---|---|---|---|---|---|---|---|
| Toyoda Gosei Scorpions | 2013-14 | 32 | 12 | 20 | .375 | 5th | - | - | - | – | - |
| Toyoda Gosei Scorpions | 2014-15 | 32 | 11 | 21 | .344 | 6th | - | - | - | – | - |
| Toyoda Gosei Scorpions | 2015-16 | 36 | 5 | 31 | .139 | 10th | - | - | - | – | - |
| Toyoda Gosei Scorpions | 2016-17 | 32 | 5 | 27 | .156 | 8th in B3 | - | - | - | – | - |
| Toyoda Gosei Scorpions | 2017-18 | 32 | 19 | 13 | .594 | 5th in B3 | - | - | - | – | - |
