= Veertien Mie Basketball =

- Division: Third
- Leagues: B.League
- Founded: 2020
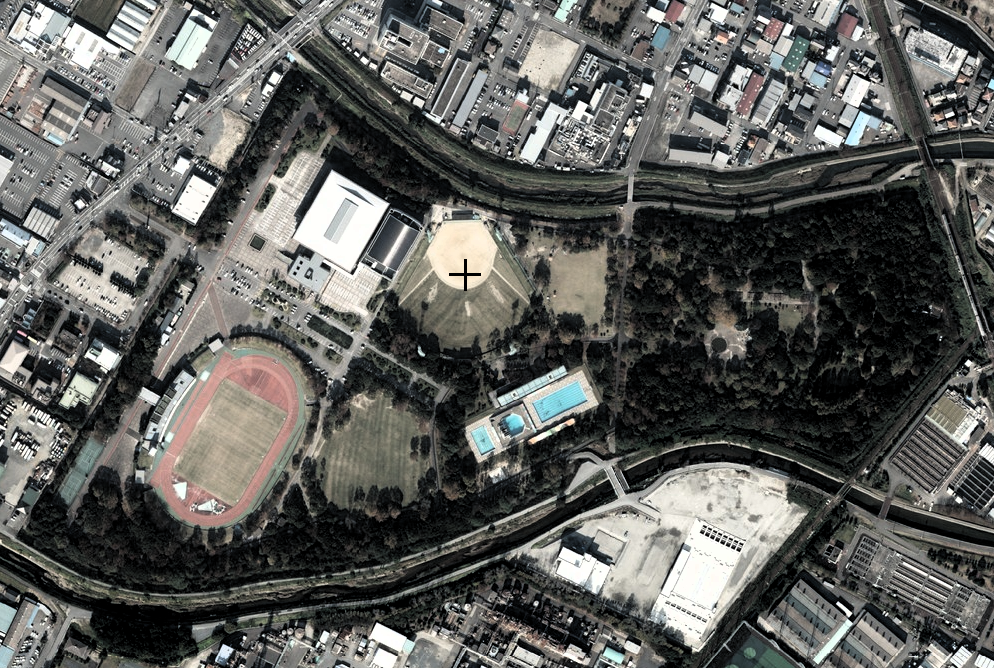
- Arena: Yokkaichi General Gymnasium
- Location: Yokkaichi, Mie
- Head coach: Masao Kuda
- Website: Official website
Home	Away

Veertien Mie Basketball is a Japanese professional basketball team based in Yokkaichi, Mie Prefecture. The team competes in the B.League Next, the third division of the B.League They are based in Yokkaichi, Mie.

== Roster ==
Veertien Mie Basketball roster
Players
Coaches

Pos.	No.	Nat.	Name
PG	0	(Japan)	Yuya Abe
SF	1	(United States)	Tucker Haymond
F/C	2	(United States)	Joshua Martin
PG	4	(Japan)	Takuya Sasaki
PF	5	(United States)	Eugene Artison
SG	7	(Japan)	Takaya Sawaki
SG	8	(Japan)	Shinya Matsuura
SG	9	(Japan)	Shuto Mizoguchi
SG	13	(Japan)	Daiki Kawata
SG	15	(Japan)	Tatsuya Kume
C	16	(Japan)	Masahiro Kawajiri
SG	20	(Japan)	Kenta Ito
PF	21	(Japan)	Dieye Sakamoto
PG	34	(Japan)	Yusuke Takamatsu
PF	41	(Japan)	Ryu Kawai
	3	(Japan)	Adison Jesmond Kougo

Head coach

Masao Kuda

Legend

- (C) Team captain
- Injured

- Roster
Updated: 31 December 2022

== Notable players ==
- Shuto Mizoguchi
- Dieye Sakamoto
- Motoshi Shimada
- Yusuke Takamatsu

== Coaches ==
- Masao Kuda

== Arenas ==
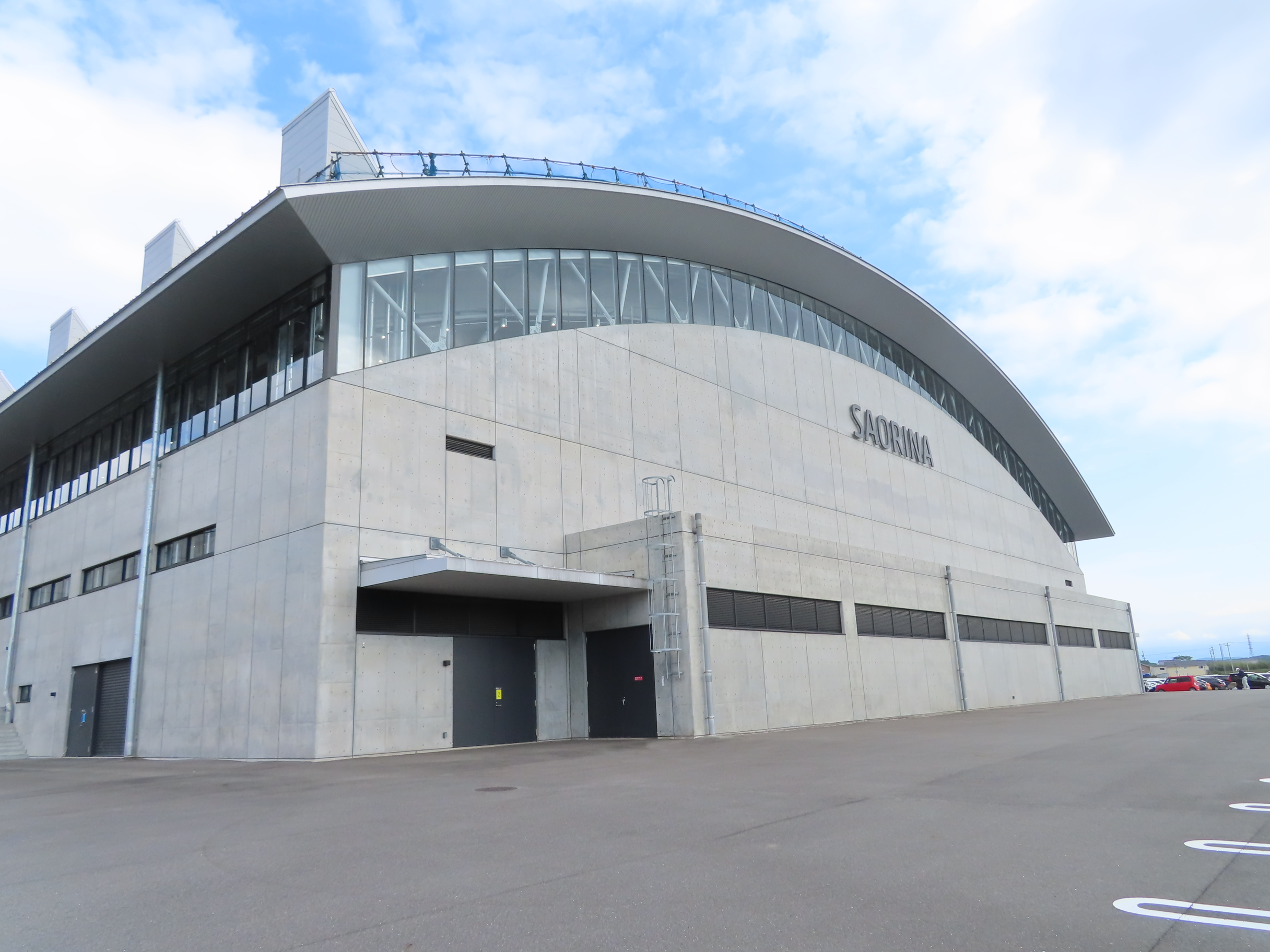
Saorina

- Yokkaichi General Gymnasium
- Ano Central Park Gymnasium
- Hisai Gymnasium
- Saorina
