= Toyoda Gosei Health Care Center =

Arena in Inazawa, Aichi, Japan

Coordinates: 35°14′45.7″N 136°49′35.0″E

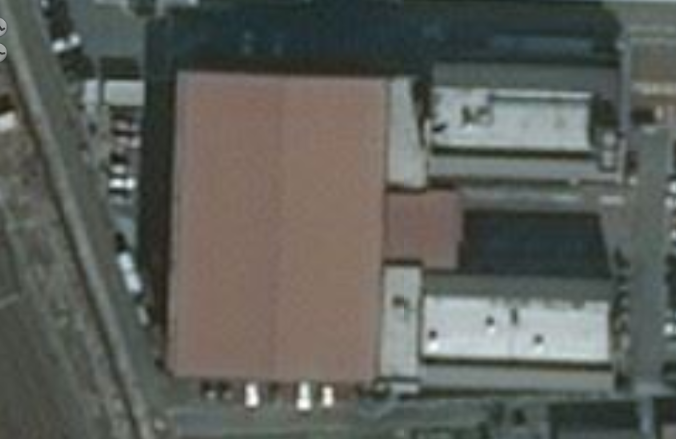
- Interactive map of Toyoda Gosei Health Care Center
- Full name: Toyoda Gosei Health Care Center
- Location: Inazawa, Aichi, Japan
- Owner: Toyoda Gosei
- Operator: Toyoda Gosei

Construction
- Cost

Tenant
- Toyoda Gosei Scorpions

Toyoda Gosei Health Care Center is an arena in Inazawa, Aichi, Japan. It is the home arena of the Toyoda Gosei Scorpions of the B.League, Japan's professional basketball league.
