= Joe Wolfinger =

American basketball player

Personal information
- Born: October 8, 1985 (age 41) Portland, Oregon
- Listed height: 7 ft 1 in (2.16 m)
- Listed weight: 265 lb (120 kg)

Career information
- High school: Aloha (Aloha, Oregon)
- College: Washington (2007–2009); Citadel (2009–2010)
- NBA draft: 2010: undrafted
- Playing career: 2010–2023
- Position: Center

Career history
- 2011–2012: Portland Chinooks
- 2012: Nippon Tornadoes
- 2012–2013: Portland Chinooks
- 2013: Sauk Valley Predators
- 2013–2014: Tokyo Excellence
- 2014–2015: Toyotsu Fighting Eagles Nagoya
- 2015–2016: Shinshu Brave Warriors
- 2016–2018: Otsuka Corporation Alphas
- 2018: Tokio Marine Nichido Big Blue
- 2018–2019: Tokyo Cinq Reves
- 2019–2020: Gifu Swoops
- 2020–2021: Toyoda Gosei Scorpions
- 2021: Tokyo Hachioji Bee Trains
- 2021–2023: Toyoda Gosei Scorpions

Joseph Raymond Wolfinger (born October 8, 1985) is an American professional basketball player for Toyoda Gosei Scorpions of the Japanese B.League.
