= Tsuen Wan Park =

Public park in Tsuen Wan, Hong Kong

Coordinates: 22.3671°N 114.1127°E

- 荃灣公園
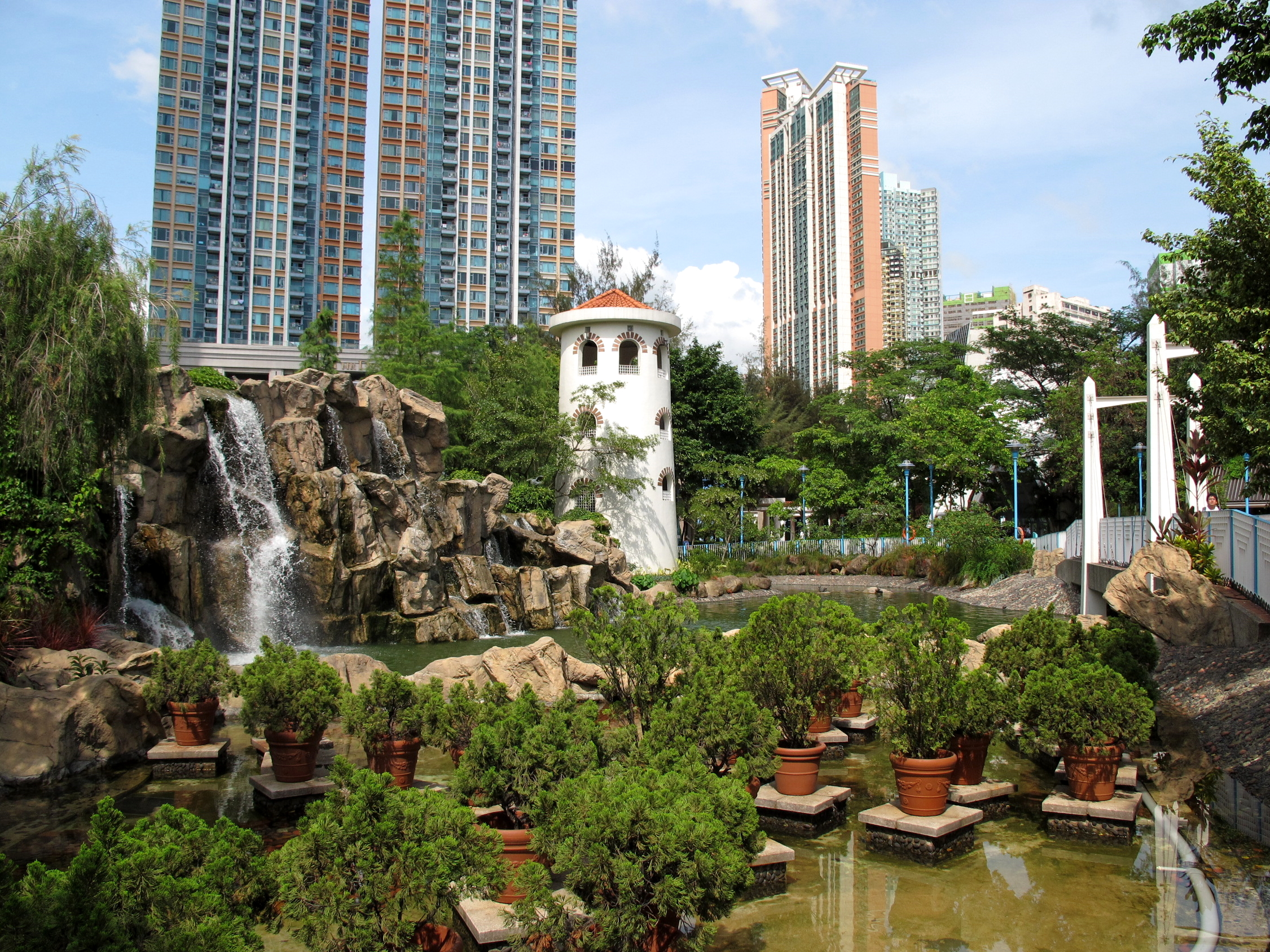
- Tsuen Wan Park Phase 1 Waterfall
- Interactive map of Tsuen Wan Park
- Type: Public park
- Location: Tsuen Wan New Town
- Area: 6.9 hectares (17 acres)
- Opened: 30 October 1998; 27 years ago
- Operator: Leisure and Cultural Services Department
- Open: Year round
- Public transit: Tsuen Wan West station

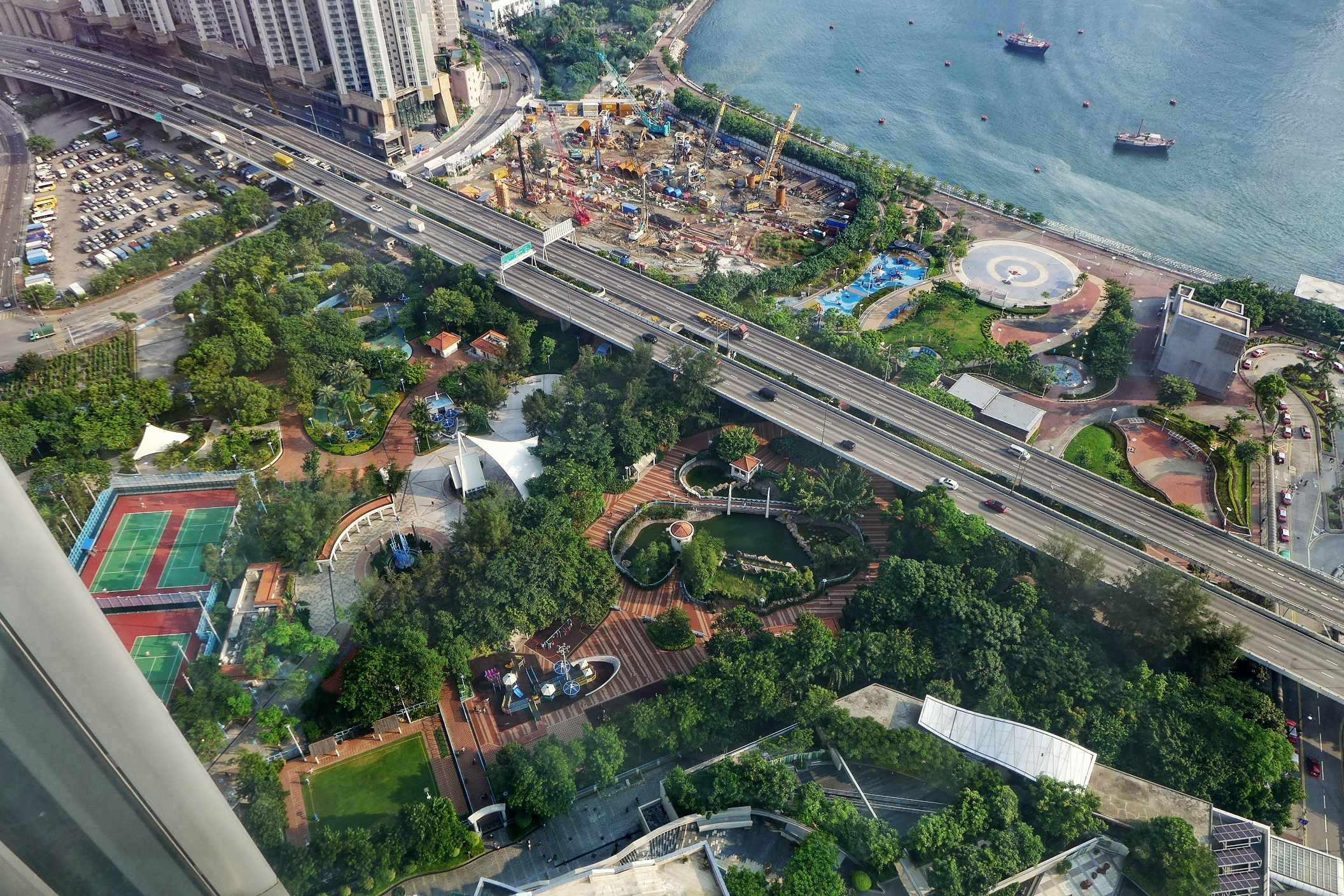
Tsuen Wan Park crossed by the elevated Tsuen Wan Road, viewed from Nina Tower.

Tsuen Wan Park (Chinese: 荃灣公園) is a park in Hong Kong. It is located in Wing Shun Street/Yeung Uk Road near Tsuen Wan Ferry Pier in Tsuen Wan, New Territories. The park was opened to the public on 30 October 1998. It is managed by the Leisure and Cultural Services Department of the Hong Kong government.

The park opens from 6:30 (6:30 am) to 23:00 (11:00 pm) daily.

== Features ==
The park occupies about 4 hectares (9.9 acres). Since it is located at the coastal area, the maritime theme was adopted in designing the project and forms an integral part of the park. The park consists of a gateball court, four tennis courts, an amphitheatre, children play and cycling areas, fitness station, artificial lake and fountains as well as landscaped garden.

The park has a waterfront promenade along the Rambler Channel. The Tsuen Wan Pier is located here. The promenade continues to the north (beyond the park boundary) to Chai Wan Kok, and to the south to the Tsuen Wan Riviera Park, which opened before Tsuen Wan Park.

The four-storey Tsuen Wan Sports Centre opened at the park in October 2018. The complex contains a 1,900-seat main arena, a secondary hall with capacity for 200 people, a children's playroom, a fitness room, an outdoor climbing wall, a table tennis room, dance rooms, and multi-purpose rooms.

== See also ==
- List of urban public parks and gardens in Hong Kong
