= Toyoda Gosei Scorpions =

- Division: Third
- Leagues: B.League
- Founded: 1980
- Arena: Toyoda Gosei Gymnasium; Toyoda Gosei Health Care Center
- Location: Kiyosu, Aichi
- Head coach: Tomoya Hibino
- Website: scorpions.toyoda-gosei.co.jp
Home	Away

The Toyoda Gosei Scorpions is a professional basketball team that competes in the third division of the Japanese B.League.

== Coaches ==
- Masao Kuda

== Roster ==
Toyoda Gosei Scorpions roster
Players
Coaches

Pos.	No.	Nat.	Name
SF	3	(Guam)	Earnest Ross
PG	12	(Japan)	Shunsuke Takamura
PG	13	(Japan)	Yuya Ukeda
PG	14	(Japan)	Kenya Hirao
C	17	(Germany)	Yashin Kolo
PF	22	(Japan)	Hironori Higuchi (C)
SF	23	(Japan)	Daisuke Kokubu
C	24	(United States)	Joe Wolfinger
PG	33	(Japan)	Ren Takemura
C	34	(United States)	Andrew Ferguson
SF	37	(Japan)	Shunsuke Fujita
SG	46	(Japan)	Hajime Imabayashi
PF	52	(Japan)	Getto Mizoguchi
SF	77	(Japan)	Kenshin Urabe

Head coach

Tomoya Hibino

Assistant coach(es)

Kensaku Tennichi

Legend

- (C) Team captain
- Injured

- Roster
Updated: 21 February 2023

== Notable players ==
- Luke Evans (fr)
- Masao Kuda
- Ladislav Pecka
- Earnest Ross
- Joe Wolfinger

== Arenas ==
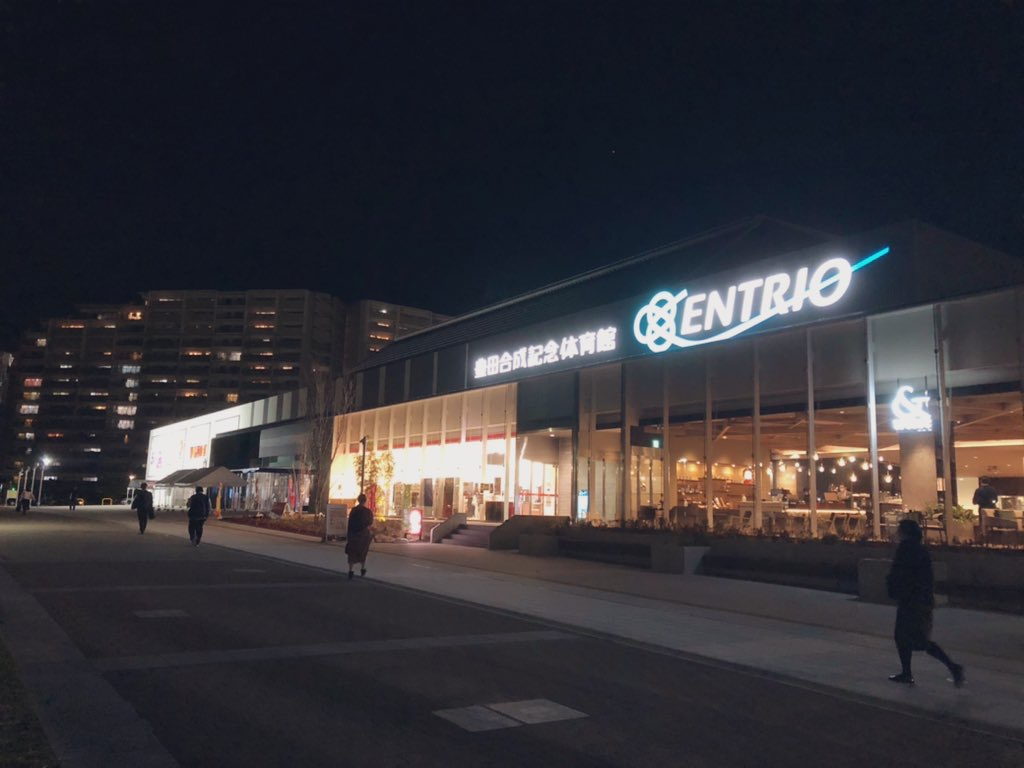
TOYODA GOSEI Memorial Gymnasium

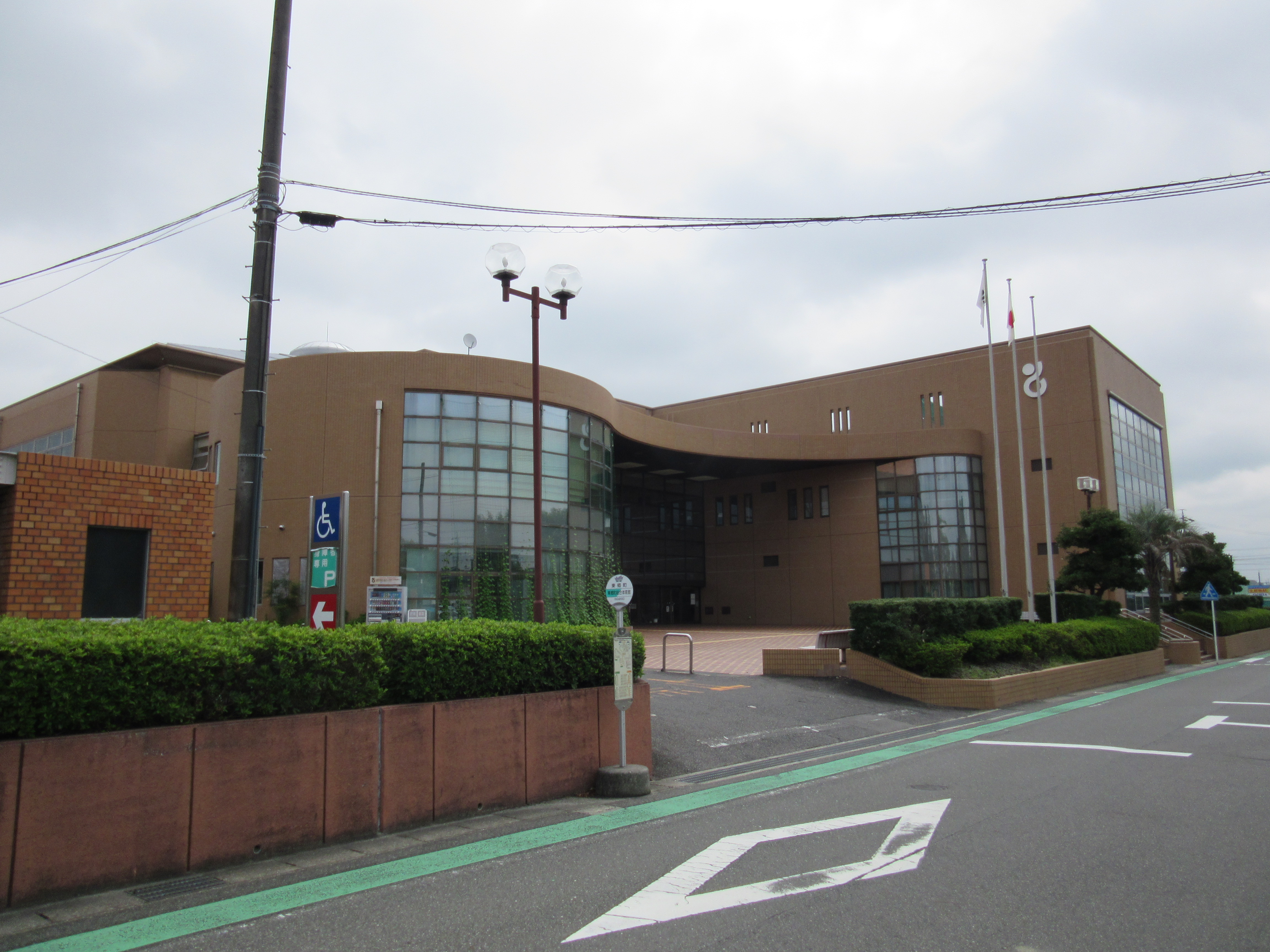
Togo Town General Gymnasium

- TOYODA GOSEI Memorial Gymnasium
- Toyoda Gosei Health Care Center
- Park Arena Komaki
- Jimokuji General Gymnasium
- Kasugai City General Gymnasium
- Ichinomiya City General Gymnasium
- Togo Town General Gymnasium
- Energy Support Arena
- Kitanagoya City Health Dome
- Oharu Town Sports Center
