= Mark Johnson (basketball) =

American basketball coach

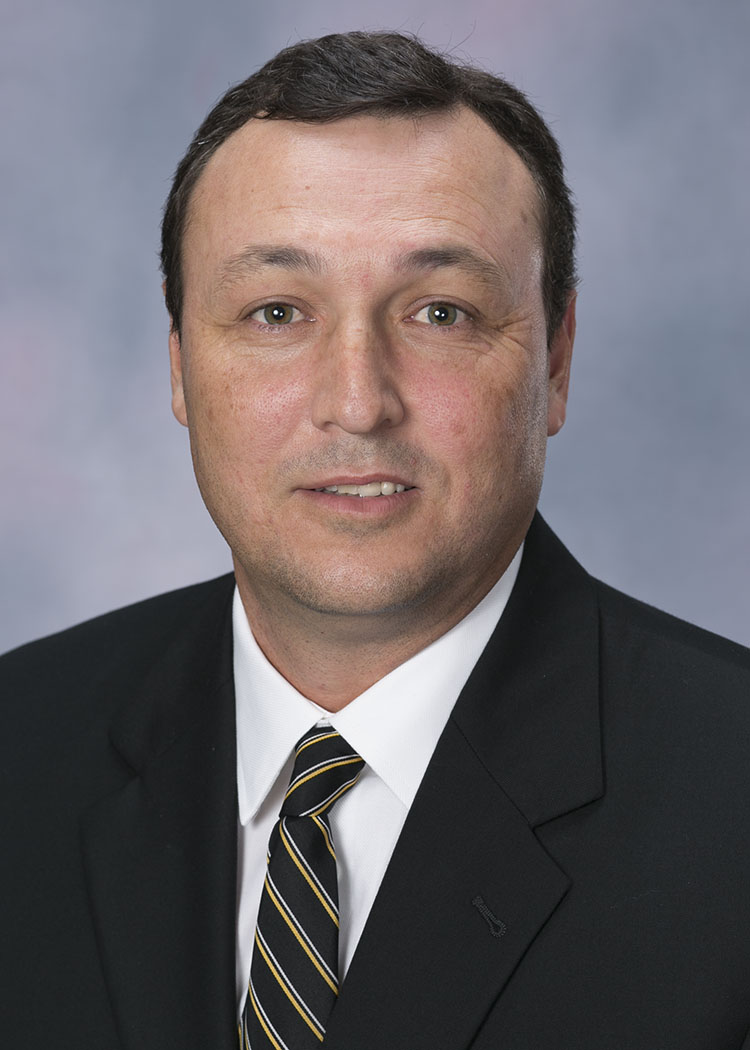

Current position
- Title: Head coach
- Team: Fort Hays State
- Conference: The MIAA
- Record: 359–172 (.676)
- Annual salary: $106,434

Biographical details
- Born: Omaha, Nebraska, U.S.
- Education: Kilgore Junior College (B.A.); Pittsburg State University (BS/MS)

Coaching career (HC unless noted)
- 1992–1994: Pittsburg State (GA)
- 1994–1995: Labette CC (assistant)
- 1995–1996: Phillips (assistant)
- 1996–2001: Fort Hays State (assistant)
- 2001–present: Fort Hays State

Head coaching record
- Overall: 359–172 (.676)

Accomplishments and honors

Championships
- MIAA regular season (2013); RMAC East Division regular season (2006)

Awards
- 2× MIAA Coach of the Year (2010, 2013); RMAC Coach of the Year (2006)

Mark A. Johnson is an American men's basketball coach, currently coaching at Fort Hays State University. Prior to his position, Johnson served as the assistant coach for the program from 1996 to 2001, as well as interim head coach leading up to the 1997–98 season. Prior to becoming an assistant coach at Fort Hays State, Johnson was an assistant at Phillips University, Labette Community College, and served as a graduate assistant for Pittsburg State University. Mark has 3 children.

== Career ==
=== Early career ===
Johnson, an Omaha, Nebraska native, began as a graduate assistant for his alma mater, Pittsburg State University. After two years, Johnson served as an assistant men's basketball coach for the Labette Cardinals for one season before moving on to Phillips University in a similar position for a season.

=== Fort Hays State ===
In 1996, Johnson was hired as an assistant coach at Fort Hays State University. Five years later in July 2001, Johnson was promoted to head coach. Since his promotion in 2001, Johnson has led the Tigers to two conference championships (one in the Rocky Mountain Athletic Conference and the other in the Mid-America Intercollegiate Athletics Association), one MIAA Tournament championship in 2011, nine 20+ win seasons, and seven NCAA Tournament appearances.

== Head coaching record ==
Record table
Season	Team	Overall	Conference	Standing	Postseason
Fort Hays State Tigers (Rocky Mountain Athletic Conference) (2001–2006)
2001–02	Fort Hays State	21–7	14–5	3rd	
2002–03	Fort Hays State	23–8	13–6	3rd	NCAA D-II first round
2003–04	Fort Hays State	17–11	11–8	4th	
2004–05	Fort Hays State	18–10	12–7	3rd	
2005–06	Fort Hays State	27–4	18–1	1st	NCAA D-II second round
Fort Hays State Tigers (Mid-America Intercollegiate Athletics Association) (2006–present)
2006–07	Fort Hays State	13–15	6–12	7th	
2007–08	Fort Hays State	19–11	10–8	5th	NCAA D-II first round
2008–09	Fort Hays State	20–9	12–8	T–3rd	
2009–10	Fort Hays State	23–7	16–4	2nd	NCAA Tournament
2010–11	Fort Hays State	26–7	16–6	2nd	NCAA Tournament
2011–12	Fort Hays State	19–9	12–8	5th	
2012–13	Fort Hays State	20–8	13–5	T–1st	
2013–14	Fort Hays State	22–8	13–6	4th	NCAA Tournament
2014–15	Fort Hays State	16–13	9–10	10th	
2015–16	Fort Hays State	20–11	13–9	4th	NCAA Tournament
2016–17	Fort Hays State	18–11	11–8	T–4th	
2017–18	Fort Hays State	19–12	10–9	7th	
2018–19	Fort Hays State	18–11	12–7	4th	
Fort Hays State:		359–172 (.676)	221–127 (.635)		
Total:		359–172 (.676)			
National champion Postseason invitational champion Conference regular season champion Conference regular season and conference tournament champion Division regular season champion Division regular season and conference tournament champion Conference tournament champion
