= Basketball at the 2018 Commonwealth Games – Men's team rosters =

This article shows the rosters of all participating teams at the men's basketball tournament at the 2018 Commonwealth Games on the Gold Coast.

== Group A ==
=== Australia ===
The following is the Australia roster in the men's basketball tournament of the 2018 Commonwealth Games.

Australia men's national basketball team – 2018 Commonwealth Games roster
Players
Coaches

| Pos. | No. | Name | Age – Date of birth | Height | Club | Ctr. |
|---|---|---|---|---|---|---|
| F | 1 | Lucas Walker | 33 – 6 December 1984 | 2.02 m (6 ft 8 in) | Perth Wildcats | (Australia) |
| G/F | 3 | Cameron Gliddon | 28 – 16 August 1989 | 1.97 m (6 ft 6 in) | Cairns Taipans | (Australia) |
| G | 4 | Chris Goulding | 29 – 24 October 1988 | 1.92 m (6 ft 4 in) | Melbourne United | (Australia) |
| G | 5 | Jason Cadee | 26 – 15 April 1991 | 1.86 m (6 ft 1 in) | Sydney Kings | (Australia) |
| G | 6 | Mitch Norton | 25 – 1 April 1993 | 1.84 m (6 ft 0 in) | Illawarra Hawks | (Australia) |
| F/C | 7 | Nick Kay | 25 – 3 August 1992 | 2.06 m (6 ft 9 in) | Illawarra Hawks | (Australia) |
| G/F | 8 | Brad Newley | 33 – 18 February 1985 | 1.99 m (6 ft 6 in) | Sydney Kings | (Australia) |
| F/C | 12 | Daniel Kickert | 34 – 29 May 1983 | 2.08 m (6 ft 10 in) | Brisbane Bullets | (Australia) |
| C | 14 | Angus Brandt | 28 – 26 October 1989 | 2.08 m (6 ft 10 in) | Perth Wildcats | (Australia) |
| G | 15 | Damian Martin | 33 – 5 September 1984 | 1.86 m (6 ft 1 in) | Perth Wildcats | (Australia) |
| G | 20 | Nathan Sobey | 27 – 14 July 1990 | 1.90 m (6 ft 3 in) | Adelaide 36ers | (Australia) |
| F | 24 | Jesse Wagstaff | 31 – 30 April 1986 | 2.03 m (6 ft 8 in) | Perth Wildcats | (Australia) |

Head coach

- (Australia) Andrej Lemanis

Assistant coach(es)

- (Australia) C. J. Bruton
- (Australia) Adam Caporn

Legend

- (C) Team captain
- Club – describes last
  club before the tournament
- Age – describes age
  on 5 April 2018

=== Canada ===
The following is the Canada roster in the men's basketball tournament of the 2018 Commonwealth Games.

Canada men's national basketball team - 2018 Commonwealth Games roster
Players
Coaches

| Pos. | No. | Name | Age – Date of birth | Height | Club | Ctr. |
|---|---|---|---|---|---|---|
| G | 4 | Ammanuel Diressa | 24 – 5 May 1993 | 1.93 m (6 ft 4 in) | Ryerson Rams | (Canada) |
| F | 5 | Jean Pierre-Charles | 24 – 28 July 1993 | 2.03 m (6 ft 8 in) | Ottawa Gee-Gees | (Canada) |
| G | 6 | Justus Alleyn | 22 – 18 October 1995 | 1.90 m (6 ft 3 in) | Manitoba Bisons | (Canada) |
| F | 7 | Mamadou Gueye | 24 – 15 October 1993 | 1.98 m (6 ft 6 in) | Alberta Golden Bears | (Canada) |
| G | 8 | Jean-Victor Mukama | 23 – 24 August 1994 | 2.03 m (6 ft 8 in) | Ryerson Rams | (Canada) |
| G | 9 | Munis Tutu | 21 – 1 July 1996 | 1.85 m (6 ft 1 in) | Carleton Ravens | (Canada) |
| F | 10 | Grant Shephard | 18 – 7 April 1999 | 2.08 m (6 ft 10 in) | UBC Thunderbirds | (Canada) |
| G/F | 11 | Mambi Diawara | 23 – 20 July 1994 | 1.95 m (6 ft 5 in) | Calgary Dinos | (Canada) |
| G | 12 | David Kapinga | 22 – 20 September 1995 | 1.80 m (5 ft 11 in) | Calgary Dinos | (Canada) |
| F | 13 | Conor Morgan | 23 – 3 August 1994 | 2.03 m (6 ft 8 in) | UBC Thunderbirds | (Canada) |
| F | 14 | Erik Nissen | 22 – 27 April 1995 | 2.06 m (6 ft 9 in) | Acadia Axemen | (Canada) |
| C | 15 | Michael Shoveller | 23 – 22 January 1995 | 2.11 m (6 ft 11 in) | Queen's Golden Gaels | (Canada) |

Head coach

- (Canada) Kirby Schepp

Assistant coach(es)

- (Canada) Dave DeAveiro
- (Canada) Kevin Hanson

Legend

- (C) Team captain
- Club - describes last
  club before the tournament
- Age - describes age
  on 5 April 2018

=== New Zealand ===
The following is the New Zealand roster in the men's basketball tournament of the 2018 Commonwealth Games.

New Zealand men's national basketball team - 2018 Commonwealth Games roster
Players
Coaches

| Pos. | No. | Name | Age – Date of birth | Height | Club | Ctr. |
|---|---|---|---|---|---|---|
| G | 1 | Reuben Te Rangi | 23 – 14 October 1994 | 1.93 m (6 ft 4 in) | Brisbane Bullets | (Australia) |
| F | 3 | Finn Delany | 22 – 12 August 1995 | 1.98 m (6 ft 6 in) | New Zealand Breakers | (New Zealand) |
| G | 5 | Shea Ili | 25 – 6 October 1992 | 1.84 m (6 ft 0 in) | New Zealand Breakers | (New Zealand) |
| G | 6 | Jarrod Kenny | 32 – 17 September 1985 | 1.88 m (6 ft 2 in) | Perth Wildcats | (Australia) |
| C | 7 | Mika Vukona (C) | 35 – 13 May 1982 | 1.97 m (6 ft 6 in) | New Zealand Breakers | (New Zealand) |
| G | 8 | Derone Raukawa | 23 – 24 July 1994 | 1.81 m (5 ft 11 in) | New Zealand Breakers | (New Zealand) |
| F | 10 | Thomas Abercrombie | 30 – 5 July 1987 | 1.98 m (6 ft 6 in) | New Zealand Breakers | (New Zealand) |
| F | 14 | Robert Loe | 26 – 5 August 1991 | 2.11 m (6 ft 11 in) | New Zealand Breakers | (New Zealand) |
| F/C | 15 | Tohi Smith-Milner | 22 – 6 October 1995 | 2.06 m (6 ft 9 in) | Melbourne United | (Australia) |
| F | 20 | Jordan Ngatai | 25 – 7 March 1993 | 1.96 m (6 ft 5 in) | New Zealand Breakers | (New Zealand) |
| G/F | 25 | Ethan Rusbatch | 25 – 24 May 1992 | 1.96 m (6 ft 5 in) | Hawke's Bay Hawks | (New Zealand) |
| C | 35 | Alex Pledger | 31 – 27 March 1987 | 2.15 m (7 ft 1 in) | New Zealand Breakers | (New Zealand) |

Head coach

- (New Zealand) Paul Henare

Assistant coach(es)

- (New Zealand) Pero Cameron
- (New Zealand) Michael Fitchett

Technical consultant

- (Australia) Aaron Fearne

Legend

- (C) Team captain
- Club - describes last
  club before the tournament
- Age - describes age
  on 5 April 2018

=== Nigeria ===
The following is the Nigeria roster in the men's basketball tournament of the 2018 Commonwealth Games.

Nigeria men's national basketball team - 2018 Commonwealth Games roster
Players
Coaches

| Pos. | No. | Name | Age – Date of birth | Height | Club | Ctr. |
|---|---|---|---|---|---|---|
| G | 1 | Uchechi Ofoegbu | 24 – 10 October 1993 | 1.96 m (6 ft 5 in) | UNLV Runnin' Rebels | (United States) |
| G | 2 | Eli Dung | 23 – 14 October 1994 | 1.93 m (6 ft 4 in) | Kano Pillars | (Nigeria) |
| G | 3 | Uchenna Iroegbu | 21 – 20 August 1996 | 1.83 m (6 ft 0 in) | Stony Brook Seawolves | (United States) |
| G | 4 | Azuoma Dike | 28 – 7 December 1989 | 1.88 m (6 ft 2 in) | Kano Pillars | (Nigeria) |
| G | 5 | Musa Usman | 26 – 27 September 1991 | 1.91 m (6 ft 3 in) | Mark Mentors | (Nigeria) |
| F/C | 6 | Ike Diogu | 34 – 11 September 1983 | 2.04 m (6 ft 8 in) | Sichuan Blue Whales | (China) |
| G | 9 | Abdulwahab Yakubu | 27 – 6 May 1990 | 1.99 m (6 ft 6 in) | Gombe Bulls | (Nigeria) |
| F | 10 | Abdul Yahaya | 27 – 24 August 1990 | 2.03 m (6 ft 8 in) | Kano Pillars | (Nigeria) |
| F | 13 | Yakubu Istifanus | 27 – 30 January 1991 | 2.01 m (6 ft 7 in) | Gombe Bulls | (Nigeria) |
| F/C | 15 | Olalekan Olatunji | 26 – 16 January 1992 | 1.93 m (6 ft 4 in) | Lagos City Stars | (Nigeria) |
| F/C | 17 | Prince Orizu | 23 – 10 August 1994 | 2.08 m (6 ft 10 in) | Far Eastern University | (Philippines) |
| F | 34 | God'sgift Achiuwa | 27 – 20 May 1990 | 2.03 m (6 ft 8 in) |

Head coach

- (Nigeria) Alexander Nwora

Assistant coach(es)

- (Nigeria) Aderemi Adewunmi
- (Nigeria) Abdulrahman Mohammed

Legend

- (C) Team captain
- Club - describes last
  club before the tournament
- Age - describes age
  on 5 April 2018

== Group B ==
=== Cameroon ===
The following is the Cameroon roster in the men's basketball tournament of the 2018 Commonwealth Games.

Cameroon men's national basketball team - 2018 Commonwealth Games roster
Players
Coaches

| Pos. | No. | Name | Age – Date of birth | Height | Club | Ctr. |
|---|---|---|---|---|---|---|
| G | 4 | Yannick Seulle | 29 – 16 January 1989 | 1.80 m (5 ft 11 in) | Yaounde Giants | (Cameroon) |
| G | 5 | Boseme Mukete Njemo | 22 – 12 November 1995 | 1.89 m (6 ft 2 in) |
| G | 6 | Robert Songolo Ngijol | 23 – 20 April 1994 | 1.93 m (6 ft 4 in) | KK Zlatibor | (Serbia) |
| G | 7 | Felix Thierry Bogmis | 25 – 13 July 1992 | 1.92 m (6 ft 4 in) | Nzui Manto | (Cameroon) |
| F | 8 | Arnold Akola Kome | 25 – 11 September 1992 | 1.96 m (6 ft 5 in) | Yaounde Giants | (Cameroon) |
| F | 9 | Ebaku Nzoh Akumenzoh | 29 – 7 March 1989 | 2.00 m (6 ft 7 in) | Yaounde Giants | (Cameroon) |
| G/F | 10 | Pierre Cedric Essome | 28 – 31 May 1989 | 1.95 m (6 ft 5 in) | Yaounde Giants | (Cameroon) |
| G | 11 | Christian Ayangma Bemouyime | 34 – 17 November 1983 | 1.97 m (6 ft 6 in) | BEAC Yaounde | (Cameroon) |
| F | 12 | Kevin Ngwese | 34 – 14 April 1983 | 1.97 m (6 ft 6 in) | Yaounde Giants | (Cameroon) |
| F | 13 | Franck Yangue | 27 – 16 November 1990 | 2.00 m (6 ft 7 in) |
| C | 14 | Mohaman Aziz Nkene Tsaace | 23 – 24 February 1995 | 2.06 m (6 ft 9 in) | BEAC Yaounde | (Cameroon) |
| C | 15 | Simon Bileg II | 29 – 15 August 1988 | 2.05 m (6 ft 9 in) | Yaounde Giants | (Cameroon) |

Head coach

- (Cameroon) Jean Ntep Ntep

Assistant coach(es)

- (Cameroon) Monikang Lumumba

Legend

- (C) Team captain
- Club - describes last
  club before the tournament
- Age - describes age
  on 5 April 2018

=== England ===
The following is the England roster in the men's basketball tournament of the 2018 Commonwealth Games.

England men's national basketball team - 2018 Commonwealth Games roster
Players
Coaches

| Pos. | No. | Name | Age – Date of birth | Height | Club | Ctr. |
|---|---|---|---|---|---|---|
| F | 0 | Jamell Anderson | 27 – 6 July 1990 | 2.00 m (6 ft 7 in) | CP La Roda | (Spain) |
| F | 1 | Daniel Edozie | 25 – 11 October 1992 | 2.03 m (6 ft 8 in) | Bristol Flyers | (England) |
| G/F | 3 | Adam Thoseby | 26 – 25 November 1991 | 1.98 m (6 ft 6 in) | Sydney Kings | (Australia) |
| G | 4 | Kofi Josephs | 26 – 13 September 1991 | 1.98 m (6 ft 6 in) | Glasgow Rocks | (Scotland) |
| F | 7 | Joseph Ikhinmwin | 30 – 18 September 1987 | 1.98 m (6 ft 6 in) | London Lions | (England) |
| G | 11 | Callum Jones | 32 – 1 October 1985 | 1.93 m (6 ft 4 in) | Manchester Giants | (England) |
| F | 14 | Robert Gilchrist | 27 – 14 October 1990 | 2.06 m (6 ft 9 in) | Worcester Wolves | (England) |
| F | 15 | Michael Tuck | 35 – 17 March 1983 | 2.01 m (6 ft 7 in) | Sheffield Sharks | (England) |
| G | 21 | Andrew Lasker | 35 – 20 November 1982 | 1.88 m (6 ft 2 in) | Newcastle Eagles | (England) |
| F | 23 | Orlan Jackman | 29 – 26 April 1988 | 2.01 m (6 ft 7 in) | Cheshire Phoenix | (England) |
| F | 31 | Andrew Thomson | 33 – 29 May 1984 | 2.05 m (6 ft 9 in) | Leicester Riders | (England) |
| F | 44 | Shane Walker | 30 – 2 November 1987 | 2.08 m (6 ft 10 in) | Leicester Riders | (England) |

Head coach

- (Greece) Andreas Kapoulas

Assistant coach(es)

- (Republic of Ireland) Alan Keane
- (England) James Vear

Legend

- (C) Team captain
- Club - describes last
  club before the tournament
- Age - describes age
  on 5 April 2018

=== India ===
The following is the India roster in the men's basketball tournament of the 2018 Commonwealth Games.

India men's national basketball team - 2018 Commonwealth Games roster
Players
Coaches

| Pos. | No. | Name | Age – Date of birth | Height | Club | Ctr. |
|---|---|---|---|---|---|---|
| F/C | 3 | Ravi Bhardwaj | 25 – 31 October 1992 | 2.07 m (6 ft 9 in) | Punjab Steelers | (India) |
| G | 4 | Joginder Singh | 29 – 27 May 1988 | 1.75 m (5 ft 9 in) | Hyderabad Sky | (India) |
| F | 6 | Aravind Annadurai | 24 – 5 July 1993 | 2.00 m (6 ft 7 in) | IOB Chennai | (India) |
| G | 7 | Justin Joseph Gnana Selvaraj | 22 – 13 July 1995 | 1.86 m (6 ft 1 in) |
| C | 10 | Amritpal Singh (C) | 27 – 5 January 1991 | 2.10 m (6 ft 11 in) | Sydney Kings | (Australia) |
| F/C | 13 | Jeevanantham Pandi | 23 – 13 October 1994 | 2.04 m (6 ft 8 in) | Mumbai Challengers | (India) |
| F | 14 | Yadwinder Singh | 31 – 30 December 1986 | 1.97 m (6 ft 6 in) | ONGC | (India) |
| F | 15 | Arvind Arumugam | 27 – 28 January 1991 | 1.97 m (6 ft 6 in) | Vijaya Bank | (India) |
| F | 22 | Amjyot Singh | 26 – 27 January 1992 | 2.03 m (6 ft 8 in) | Oklahoma City Blue | (United States) |
| F | 44 | Arshpreet Bhullar | 21 – 2 October 1996 | 1.90 m (6 ft 3 in) | Pune Peshwas | (India) |
| C | 52 | Satnam Singh Bhamara | 22 – 10 December 1995 | 2.18 m (7 ft 2 in) | Texas Legends | (United States) |
| G | 66 | Akilan Pari | 28 – 20 July 1989 | 1.80 m (5 ft 11 in) | Punjab Steelers | (India) |

Head coach

- (India) Rajinder Singh

Assistant coach(es)

- (India) G.R.L. Prasad

Legend

- (C) Team captain
- Club - describes last
  club before the tournament
- Age - describes age
  on 5 April 2018

=== Scotland ===
The following is the Scotland roster in the men's basketball tournament of the 2018 Commonwealth Games.

Scotland men's national basketball team - 2018 Commonwealth Games roster
Players
Coaches

| Pos. | No. | Name | Age – Date of birth | Height | Club | Ctr. |
|---|---|---|---|---|---|---|
| F/C | 0 | Michael Vigor | 27 – 17 September 1990 | 2.05 m (6 ft 9 in) | Bristol Flyers | (England) |
| G | 6 | Kyle Jimenez | 19 – 3 May 1998 | 1.87 m (6 ft 2 in) | Glasgow Rocks | (Scotland) |
| G | 7 | Fraser Malcolm | 21 – 23 May 1996 | 1.98 m (6 ft 6 in) | Black Hills State | (United States) |
| G | 8 | Bantu Burroughs | 27 – 17 January 1991 | 1.83 m (6 ft 0 in) | Glasgow Rocks | (Scotland) |
| G | 9 | Jonathan Bunyan | 25 – 1 June 1992 | 1.82 m (6 ft 0 in) | Glasgow Rocks | (Scotland) |
| G | 10 | Callan Low | 17 – 11 November 2000 | 1.85 m (6 ft 1 in) | Myerscough | (England) |
| F | 11 | Gareth Murray | 33 – 23 September 1984 | 2.01 m (6 ft 7 in) | Glasgow Rocks | (Scotland) |
| G | 12 | Sean Nealon-Lino | 18 – 13 August 1999 | 1.93 m (6 ft 4 in) | Kent Crusaders | (England) |
| F | 13 | Nicholas Collins | 33 – 11 July 1984 | 1.95 m (6 ft 5 in) | St Mirren | (Scotland) |
| C | 14 | Christopher Cleary | 29 – 5 October 1988 | 2.00 m (6 ft 7 in) | Glasgow Rocks | (Scotland) |
| F | 15 | Alasdair Fraser | 25 – 13 August 1992 | 2.01 m (6 ft 7 in) | Glasgow Rocks | (Scotland) |
| F/C | 20 | Kieron Achara (C) | 34 – 3 July 1983 | 2.08 m (6 ft 10 in) | Glasgow Rocks | (Scotland) |

Head coach

- (Australia) Rob Beveridge

Assistant coach(es)

- (Scotland) Craig Nicol

Legend

- (C) Team captain
- Club - describes last
  club before the tournament
- Age - describes age
  on 5 April 2018

== See also ==
- Basketball at the 2018 Commonwealth Games – Women's team rosters
