= 2016 UBA Pro Basketball League =

2016 UBA Pro Basketball League season
- League: UBA Pro Basketball League
- Sport: Basketball
- Duration: 18 – 28 February 2016 (Phase-1); 23 – 26 March 2016 (Phase-2); 27 March 2016 (Play-offs); 28 – 30 March 2016 (Semi-finals); 1 – 3 April 2016 (Finals)
- Teams: 8
- TV partner(s): TEN Action, TEN Sports, Ten HD
- Season champions: Delhi Capitals (1st Title)
- Runners-up: Chennai Slam
- Season MVP: Vinay Kaushik

Seasons
- ← 2015 2016 (season 3) →

The UBA Pro Basketball League season was the 2nd season of the UBA Pro Basketball League. The Phase-1 of the season began on 28 February 2016 at the Shree Shiv Chhatrapati Sports Complex, Pune.

UBA has partnered with Emmy Award winning broadcaster Paul Crane who has covered sports at the highest levels in the United States for over three decades, to present the Pro Basketball League 2016. Steve Graham, executive producer of the League, has been involved with six past Olympic Games, international triathlons, auto racing and international volleyball games in his career.

Bollywood actor Suniel Shetty and BJP MP and President of the Maharashtra State Basketball Association Poonam Mahajan were the chief guests of the opening ceremony that held on 18 February 2016 at the Pune’s Balewadi Stadium. Basketball Federation of India is extended its support to this event, and former international player, Norman Isaac of BFI.

Delhi Capitals were crowned champions of Season 2 after beating defending champions Chennai Slam by 2-1 in the best-of-three final series. Vinay Kaushik was named MVP.

== Format ==
The UBA schedule has each of its teams playing an equal number of regular season games with their won-loss records used to qualify for the league’s post-season. Each team will play each of its division opponents four times along with one cross division opponent, which will rotate each season. Each division will stage a one game play-in between its second and third place teams with the winner to face the first-place team in a best-of-three semifinal followed by a best-of-three final between the division winners to determine the UBA Champion.

== Teams ==
There are currently 8 franchise teams competing in the tournament divided into two divisions:

=== North Division ===
Teams	State/City
Haryana Gold	Haryana
Punjab Steelers	Punjab, India
Delhi Capitals	Delhi
Mumbai Challengers	Mumbai

=== South Division ===
Teams	State/City
Pune Peshwas	Pune
Bengaluru Beast	Bengaluru
Chennai Slam	Chennai
Hyderabad Sky	Hyderabad

== Standings ==
=== North Division ===
Teams	W	L	GB
Delhi Capitals	6	1	0
Mumbai Challengers	4	3	2
Punjab Steelers	3	4	3
Haryana Gold	0	7	6

=== South Division ===
Teams	W	L	GB
Pune Peshwas	4	3	0
Chennai Slam	4	3	0
Bengaluru Beast	4	3	0
Hyderabad Sky	3	4	1

== Brackets ==
Play-offs
North Division
N2	Mumbai Challengers	1
N3	Punjab Steelers	0
South Division
S2	Pune Peshwas	1
S3	Bengaluru Beast	0

Semi-finals
N1	Delhi Capitals	2
N2	Mumbai Challengers	1
S1	Chennai Slam	2
S2	Pune Peshwas	1

Championship
N1	Delhi Capitals	2
S1	Chennai Slam	1

Note:
1: Play-offs will be One-game playoff.
2: Semi-finals and Finals will be best of three games.

=== Play-offs ===
Mumbai Challengers and Pune Peshwas through to semi-finals.

27 March 2016
16:30 IST

Report

Mumbai Challengers	78–76	Punjab Steelers
Scoring by quarter: 18-17, 21-17, 9-21, 30-21
Pts: Gagandeep Singh 23; Rebs: Gagandeep Singh 12; Asts: Jagdeep Singh Bains 4		Pts: Gurvinder Gill 21; Rebs: Gurvinder Gill 16; Asts: Akilan Pari 5

Gachibowli Indoor Stadium, Hyderabad

27 March 2016
19:00 IST

Report

Pune Peshwas	79–73	Bengaluru Beast
Scoring by quarter: 12-15, 21-23, 16-17, 30-18
Pts: Narender Grewal 23; Rebs: Narender Grewal 11; Asts: Siddhanth Shinde 5		Pts: Kaif Zia 27; Rebs: Manpreet 10

Gachibowli Indoor Stadium, Hyderabad

=== Semi-finals ===
Team 1	Agg.	Team 2	1st leg	2nd leg	3rd leg
Delhi Capitals	2–1	Mumbai Challengers	69–75	72–61	78–69
Chennai Slam	2–1	Pune Peshwas	88–72	71–73	97–79

=== Championship ===
Team 1	Agg.	Team 2	1st leg	2nd leg	3rd leg
Chennai Slam	1–2	Delhi Capitals	77–62	67–77	65–92

1 April 2016
19:00 IST

Report

Chennai Slam	77–62	Delhi Capitals
Scoring by quarter: 15-16, 25-9, 15-18, 22-19
Pts: Gopal Ram 22		Pts: Ramesh 15

Gachibowli Indoor Stadium, Hyderabad

2 April 2016
19:00 IST

Report

Delhi Capitals	77–67	Chennai Slam
Scoring by quarter: 20-10, 21-18, 12-22, 24-17
Pts: Ramesh 17		Pts: Arjun GK 21

Gachibowli Indoor Stadium, Hyderabad

3 April 2016
19:00 IST

Report

Delhi Capitals	92–65	Chennai Slam
Scoring by quarter: 21-18, 24-13, 20-14, 27-20
Pts: Ajay Pratap Singh 21		Pts: Cammy Carmel 22

Gachibowli Indoor Stadium, Hyderabad
