= Amjyot Singh =

Indian professional basketball player (born 1992)

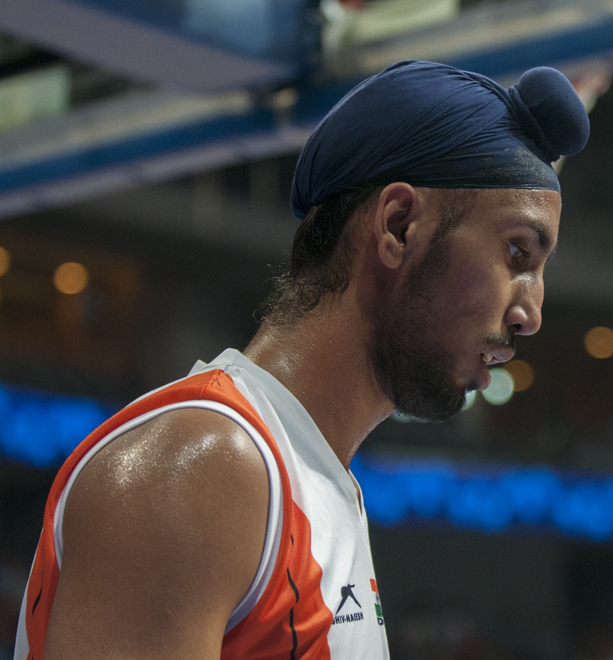
- Singh with the Indian national team in 2013

Personal information
- Born: 27 January 1992 (age 34) Chandigarh, India
- Listed height: 6 ft 8 in (2.03 m)
- Listed weight: 229 lb (104 kg)

Career information
- NBA draft: 2014: undrafted
- Playing career: 2015–2023
- Position: Power forward / small forward

Career history
- 2015–2016: Yokohama Excellence
- 2016–2017: Delhi Capitals
- 2017–2018: Oklahoma City Blue
- 2019: Wisconsin Herd
- 2019-2022: Punjab
- 2023: Filou Oostende

Career highlights
- National Basketball Championship winner (2019)
Medals
Men's basketball
Representing India
Lusophony Games
| Gold medal – first place | 2014 Goa | Team |

Amjyot Singh Gill (born January 27, 1992) is a former Indian professional basketball player. He has previously played for the Oklahoma City Blue and Wisconsin Herd of the NBA G-League, the Yokohama Excellence of the B.League and the Delhi Capitals of the UBA Pro Basketball League. He and Amritpal Singh became the first Indian male to sign a professional basketball contract abroad. Singh, along with Princepal Singh became the first players to sign with the NBA G League.

At 6 ft 8 in (2.04m), Singh is primarily a forward and has regularly competed with India on the international stage, playing in several editions of the FIBA Asia Championship. A native of Chandigarh, he was trained at the Ludhiana Basketball Academy in Ludhiana while playing for the Punjab state team. Early in his career, Singh spent several years with local teams in Punjab and Tamil Nadu, winning the Senior National Basketball Championship multiple times.

== Early life and career ==
Singh was born on 27 January 1992 in a jat Sikh family in Chandigarh. His mother Nirmal Kaur was an athlete, while his father Mohinder Singh was sub-inspector of the Chandigarh Police and a former member of the India national basketball team. Amjyot started out by playing cricket, the most popular game in India, and he was mainly a bowler. In high school, an injury prevented him from playing cricket for three months. During the time, Singh's interest of basketball grew, and his father and coach advised him to switch. He joined his high school team in 2007. Singh said, "In all honesty, I didn't even know the rules of basketball or even thought of playing the sport ever."

By 2008, Singh was promoted to the state team and the national under-16 team. He also joined the prestigious Ludhiana Basketball Academy in Ludhiana, Punjab. The Punjab state-run academy has trained many of India's top players, such as Satnam Singh Bhamara, Amritpal Singh, and Jagdeep Singh. With Ludhiana, Amjyot was coached by S. Subramanian. Singh, in 2010, led Punjab to a junior national basketball title as its captain. In March 2011, his Ludhiana team was defeated by Punjab Police Jalandhar at the Shaheed-e-azam Bhagat Singh Punjab Games championship.

Singh won the 2012 Senior National Basketball Championship with Punjab, helping defeat Tamil Nadu by 8 points. In May 2012, he was selected to play at the third edition of the India Basketball All-Star Showcase in Mumbai. In 2013, Singh left Punjab to join Tamil Nadu at the Senior National Basketball Championship. However, he was unable to play because he did not receive a No Objection Certificate (NOC) to compete for Tamil Nadu. Without Singh, they were defeated by his old team in the semifinal round. At the same event in 2014, Singh was forced to sit out again after suffering five fractures to his nose during the tournament. Despite his absence, his Tamil Nadu team won the title.

== Professional career ==
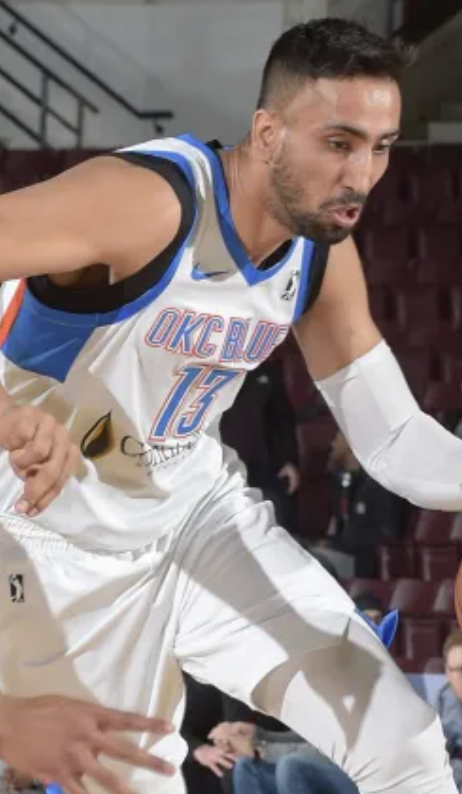
Singh with the Oklahoma City Blue during the 2018-19 season.

=== NBDL: Kobe Storks (2015-2016) ===
In the summer of 2015, Singh took part in the BJ Challenge Summer League in Japan, where he played for Hyogo Impulse, the developmental team to the Kobe Storks, in pursuit of a professional contract. He saw immediate success in his first week with his team at the summer league. On 25 August 2015, he signed a one-year contract with the Yokohama Excellence of the National Basketball Development League (NBDL), the second-tier league in Japan. Singh and former Hyogo teammate Amritpal Singh, who joined the Excellence at the same time, became the first Indian men's players to play in a professional basketball league outside of India. He finished the season averaging 18 points, 10 rebounds, 2 assists, and 4 blocks per game.

=== NBA D-League (2017-2019) ===
On October 12, 2016, Singh signed with the NBA D-League after going undrafted.

=== NBA G League: Oklahoma City Blue and Wisconsin Herd (2017-2019) ===
On 17 March 2018, Singh was waived by the Oklahoma City Blue, but was re-signed five days later. Singh later became the 3rd Indian-born player to hold an NBA G League roster spot. With the Blue, Singh played a total of 30 games for them, where he averaged 2.7 points, one rebound, and 0.4 assists on 8.3 minutes of gameplay.

On February 18, 2019, Singh signed with the Wisconsin Herd to fill in roster void while Xavier Munford was playing for USA Basketball. In his six games with the Herd, Singh averaged two points, 1.7 rebounds, and 0.7 assists in the six games he played with them.

== National team career ==
Singh made his first international appearance for India with the under-16 national basketball team at the Children of Asia Games in Yakutia, Russia. In the following years, he played with the under-18 team and was soon promoted to the senior national team.

=== 2011 FIBA Asia Championship ===
Singh made his first appearance for the senior team at the 2011 FIBA Asia Championship in Wuhan, China. In his debut on 15 September 2011, he recorded 2 points, 2 rebounds, and 2 blocks vs. Lebanon. At the event, Singh most notably posted a double-double of 13 points and a team-high 12 rebounds against Malaysia. Singh averaged 6.2 points, 7.2 rebounds, and 1.8 blocks per game mostly coming off the bench, but India would lose all four of their games.

=== 2013 FIBA Asia Championship ===
In June 2013, Singh helped the India national basketball team earn a bid for the 2013 FIBA Asia Championship in Metro Manila, Philippines, scoring 13 points in a win over Afghanistan at the qualifying round of the SABA Championship. At the FIBA Asia Championship, Singh took on a starting role for the Indian team, averaging 9.6 points, 6.9 rebounds, and 1.4 blocks en route to a 2–6 record. India suffered an overtime loss to Bahrain in their opening game, as Singh scored 16 points and grabbed 14 rebounds.

=== 2015 FIBA Asia Championship ===
Singh represented India at the 2015 FIBA Asia Championship in Changsha, China where he recorded most minutes, points, rebounds and blocks for his team. He was the tournament's overall second-best scorer. Later on he went on to represent India at the 2016 Williams Jones Invitational Cup followed by the 2016 FIBA Asia Challenge. Singh is also the first Indian national to participate in the FIBA 3x3 World Tour Finals. In 2016, he starred in the FIBA Asia Challenge, where he averaged 12.8 points, 8.3 rebounds, 2.4 assists, and 0.6 blocks. He led the tournament in free-throw percentage.

In July 2016, Singh competed at the William Jones Cup for India. He entered the tournament expected to be one of his team's top scorers.

== Player Profile ==
At the time, former head coach of the Blue, Mark Daigneault stated that "Amjyot has a really-really strong skillset for his size, so he shoots the ball effortlessly, he can put the ball on the court, he's got good court vision." Daigneault also stated how he's developed very well offensively and defensively.

== Legal issues ==
In 2018, the Basketball Federation of India (BFI) placed a one-year ban on Singh, along with Palpreet Singh. This was due to indisciplined activities before and during the 2018 Commonwealth Games in April.

In November 2019, Amjyot Singh went out to party with fellow Indian basketball teammates Arshpreet Bhullar, Armaan Sandhu, and Amritpal Singh without obtaining the necessary permission. Later that night, the group was involved in a motorcycle accident in Bengaluru, where all of them sustained injuries. During the incident, Singh and Bhullar reportedly got into a roadside altercation. The event was described as a drunken fight that took place while they were attending a national team camp. Due to this incident, in December, following their games, both Singh and Bhullar received bans, with Singh getting a three-year ban, while Bhullar received a one-year ban. Sandhu and Amritpal Singh were issued warnings for their actions.

== Personal life ==
Singh is also a police officer for the state Punjab. He is married to Manpreet Gill, Singh also has two kids he has a four-year-old son, named Agampartap, and an two-year-old son whose name hasn't been publicly announced.

Singh stated that his favorite NBA player is Kevin Durant, whom Singh modeled his game after.

Singh, along with other Indian basketball stars, is also the honorary general secretary of the Punjab Basketball Association (PBA) men's and women's basketball team.

== See also ==
- Patka in sports
- Notable players of India's National Basketball Championship
