= Jagdeep Singh (basketball) =

Indian basketball player

Personal information
- Born: 10 January 1986 (age 40) Sri Ganganagar, Rajasthan, India
- Listed height: 6 ft 6 in (1.98 m)
- Listed weight: 213 lb (97 kg)

Career information
- High school: Ludhiana Basketball Academy (Ludhiana, Punjab)
- Playing career: 2008–2012
- Position: Center

Career history
- 2008–2016: Punjab Police
- 2016: Mumbai Challengers
- 2023: Mumbai Stars

Career highlights
- Indian All-Star (2011)

Jagdeep Singh Bains (Hindi: जगदीप सिंह; born 10 January 1986) is an Indian professional basketball player. Before playing for Mumbai Challengers of the UBA Pro Basketball League, he spent his first seven seasons with Punjab Police Jalandhar in the Indian National Basketball Championship. Singh was dismissed from Punjab in 2012 and suffered a career-threatening injury. He returned to basketball in 2016, when he signed with the Challengers. He last played for Mumbai Stars in Elite Pro Basketball League. Singh competed with the India national basketball team at the FIBA Asia Championship. Singh has completed his degree of coaching from the Netaji Subhas National Institute of Sports in 2019.

== Early life ==
Singh was born on 10 January 1986 in Sri Ganganagar, Rajasthan. His father coached athletics, and Jagdeep was a runner. Due to his exceptional height, he drew the attention of a local basketball coach in 2002. Singh joined the Rajasthan team in the following year, competing in school nationals. He was soon noticed by coach Sankaran Subramanian, and he was invited to the prestigious Ludhiana Basketball Academy in Ludhiana, Punjab. Subramanian trained Singh for five to six hours each day, and he taught him fundamental basketball skills.

== International career ==
Shortly after becoming a part of Ludhiana Basketball Academy early in his career, Singh joined the India junior national team. At age 19, he became a member of the senior team. Singh competed for India at both the FIBA Asia Championship 2007 and FIBA Asia Championship 2009. He averaged 11.4 points per game at the 2007 tournament for the 15th placed Indians. In 2009, he averaged a team-leading 7.8 rebounds per game as the Indian team improved to a 13th-place finish. In both of India's victories, he was the game-leading rebounder, grabbing 10 against Indonesia and 15 against Uzbekistan.
