= Shiv Khoiwal =

Indian basketball player (born 1989)

Personal information
- Nationality: Indian
- Citizenship: India
- Born: 20 August 1989 (age 36) Khatik Mohalla, Bhilwara, Rajasthan
- Education: Bachelor of Arts; Jayoti Vidyapeeth Women's University, Jaipur
- Occupation: Govt service
- Years active: 2000 - present
- Height: 6 ft (183 cm)

Sport
- Country: India
- Sport: Basketball
- Position: 34
- League: UBA Pro Basketball League
- Team: Hyderabad Sky

Achievements and titles
- World finals: Middle Asia Zone Qualify Round

Shiv Khoiwal (born 20 August 1989) is an Indian professional basketball player, currently with Hyderabad Sky of the UBA Pro Basketball League. He is 4 times gold medalist in National and silver medalist in International.

He represented India's national basketball team at the 'Middle Asia Zone Qualify Round' in Almaty, Kazakhstan in 2006, where he was Silver Medalist. He has participated in 28 National tournaments. Currently working in Income Tax Department. He also played in Junior Asian Basketball Championship 2006 held at China.

== Early life and education ==
Shiv completed schooling from G.S.S.S. Rajendra Marg Bhilwara School and then completed Graduation in Arts from Jayoti Vidyapeeth Women's University, Jaipur via distance mode.

== Title ==
- Former Captain in Delhi Basketball Team 2006 to 2008.
- Former Captain in Tata Steel Basketball Team 2009 to 2010.

== Honour ==
- In 2021, The Rajasthan government has included his name in the book of competitive examinations to honor Shiv Khoiwal as the state's symbol in the state game of basketball.
