= Basketball in India =

- Country: India
- Governing body: Basketball Federation of India
- National teams: Men's 5x5; Women's 5x5; Men's 3x3; Women's 3x3
- Nickname: Indian Cagers

National competitions
- Men's National Championship; Women's National Championship

Club competitions
- India Basketball League (2026–present)

In India, basketball is a popular sport with a multiple club league system, as well as state and national teams. Indian basketball made significant improvements, most notably in 2015, making them one of the top emerging continental teams.

== History ==
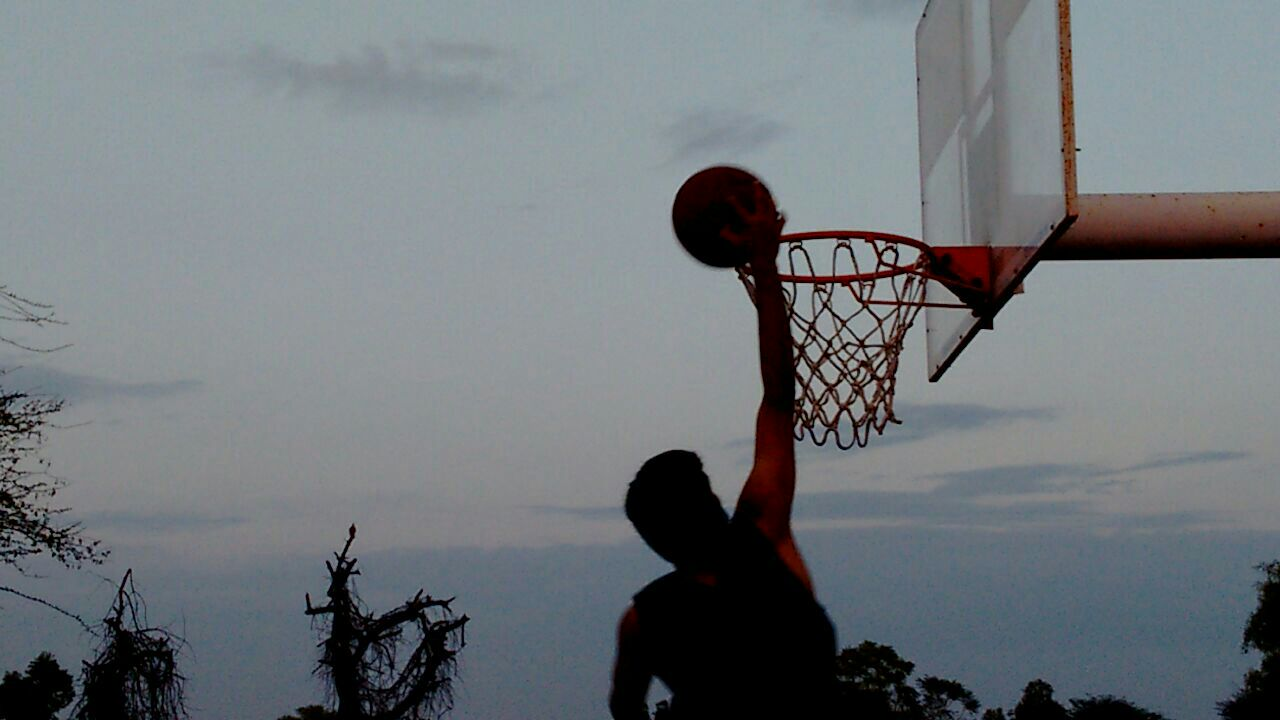
Basketball at Manipal University Jaipur

Basketball was brought to India in 1893–4 by Canadian T. Duncan Patton, who later returned to India as the Acting General Secretary of the Calcutta YMCA from 1903 to 1905. The game was initially most popular among women, although slow to spread. The country's first match is recorded as 1930 by some sources, with the first Indian National Championship for men being held in 1934 in New Delhi. The Basketball Federation of India (BFI), which controls the game in India, was formed in 1950.

=== Basketball in India as of today ===
Basketball is played in most Indian high schools, colleges and universities . There is considerable patronage for the game among the younger generation. It is played by both men and women of all ages and ability. Many government institutions have professional basketball teams who play for them. For example, ONGC in Uttarakhand, Indian Overseas Bank in Tamil Nadu, Indian Bank in Karnataka, Mahanagar Telephone Nigam Limited in New Delhi, Indian Railways, and Kerala State Electricity Board in Trivandrum play for their respective institution and state.

There are many championships for senior, junior, and youth levels for boys and girls. Invitational all-India tournaments like Master Prithvinath Memorial, Don Bosco Invitational Tournament, Kiloi Invitational Tournament, Ramu Memorial and many other are being organised every year. Indian basketball has championships throughout the year for different age groups. Championships for youth are mainly between April and July when children have their summer break from school.

Basketball is especially popular among the Tibetan exile community in Dharamshala.

Being one of the earliest countries to adopt basketball, India has so far produced numerous talented basketballers who have earned recognition in the international arena. Indian players have also won several trophies for their country. Basketball in India is mainly being run and managed by a large number of national and state level associations, spread all over India. These basketball associations are working with a common view of popularising the game in all parts of the country. Apart from that, developing the overall infrastructure for the game and uncovering new talent from the grassroots level are some of the other principal objectives of the Indian basketball associations.

India's first ever professional basketball league UBA was started in 2015. UBA completed four seasons in India.

=== National federation ===
The Basketball Federation of India was established in 1950 and is the official governing body of basketball in India. It follows FIBA rules for organising basketball championships and is affiliated to FIBA Asia and the Indian Olympic Association.

== National teams ==
=== Men's ===
- India men's national basketball team
- India men's national 3x3 team

=== Women's ===
- India women's national basketball team
- India women's national 3x3 team

=== Youth ===
- India men's national under-18 basketball team
- India men's national under-16 basketball team
- India men's national under-18 3x3 team
- India women's national under-18 basketball team
- India women's national under-16 basketball team
- India women's national under-18 3x3 team

== League system ==
India created its first professional basketball league, titled Universal Basketball Alliance (UBA), in 2015. The first winner of the UBA was Chennai Slam. The tournament was folded in 2017 after it completed its fourth season and in 2022 the league was replaced with the EPBL and the developmental INBL.

The National Basketball Championship is national level basketball tournament for both men and women, organised by the Basketball Federation of India, contested among the regional state teams affiliated under the federation.

- 5x5 format
1. National Star Basketball League
- 3x3 format
1. TBA

=== Other tournaments ===
1. Indian National Basketball League: U25 league
2. National Basketball Championship (men's and women's national championships
3. Indian School/College Basketball League
4. U23 National Basketball Championship

== National award recipients ==
Year	Recipient	Award	Gender
1961	Sarbjit Singh	Arjuna Award	Male
1967	Khushi Ram	Arjuna Award	Male
1968	Gurdial Singh	Arjuna Award	Male
1969	Hari Dutt	Arjuna Award	Male
1970	Gulam Abbas Moontasir	Arjuna Award	Male
1971	M. M. Singh	Arjuna Award	Male
1973	Surendra Kumar Kataria	Arjuna Award	Male
1974	Anil Kumar Punj	Arjuna Award	Male
1975	Hanuman Singh	Arjuna Award	Male
1977–1978	T. Vijayaraghava	Arjuna Award	Male
1979–1980	Om Prakash	Arjuna Award	Male
1982	Ajmer Singh	Arjuna Award	Male
1983	Suman Sharma	Arjuna Award	Female
1983	Radhey Shyam	Arjuna Award	Male
1999	Sajjan Singh Cheema ^{+}	Arjuna Award	Male
2001	Parmender Singh	Arjuna Award	Male
2014	Geethu Anna Jose	Arjuna Award	Female
2017	Prashanti Singh	Arjuna Award	Female
2020	Vishesh Bhriguvanshi	Arjuna Award	Male
2002	Aparna Ghosh	Dhyan Chand Award	Female
2003	Ram Kumar	Dhyan Chand Award	Male

Key
+ Indicates a Lifetime contribution honour

== International influence ==
=== NBA in India ===
The National Basketball Association has sought to expand the sport's popularity among Indian people by partnering with Basketball Federation of India.

=== 2008 ===
Late in 2008, NBA great Robert Parish came to India as part of the NBA/WNBA Hoop School Program. This relationship further expanded into a cultural exchange, which saw Bollywood superstars Lara Dutta and Dino Morea make a trip to watch the Los Angeles Lakers in action, and on 8 April 2009, saw the NBA inaugurate a refurbished basketball court in a Mumbai suburb.

=== 2015 ===
In April 2015, Canadian Sim Bhullar made his professional debut in the NBA, becoming the first player of Indian descent in the league. Two months later, Satnam Singh Bhamara became the first Indian to ever be selected in the NBA by being the 52nd pick in the 2015 NBA draft for the Dallas Mavericks. He'd also been the first player to be drafted as a high school postgraduate since 2005.

=== 2017 ===
In April 2017, India on track (IOT) collaborated with NBA to form NBA Basketball Schools to train kids and teach them to play the NBA way. There are more than 12 centres running around the country from Delhi, Mumbai, Pune, and many more.

=== 2019 ===
The first ever NBA games in India took place on 4 and 5 October 2019 at the NSCI Dome in Mumbai. The NBA India Games featured two preseason games between the Sacramento Kings and Indiana Pacers, and marked the first time that teams from a North American sports league played in India.

=== IMG Reliance joint venture ===
In June 2010, a deal was struck with the Basketball Federation of India and the IMG-Reliance joint venture which aimed to take Indian basketball to a professional level. The 30-year deal sees IMG Reliance take control of the game launching a league, controlling merchandise and developing infrastructure, in return for commercial rights. The deal was run by IMG executives Ted Fortsmann, Bobby Sharma, and Reliance owner Mukesh Ambani, who used the IPL as a model for design.

The BFI will launch and control school and college leagues with assistance from IMG. IMG Reliance will also construct academies in India in line with the IMG Florida sports academy. In July, coaches from Florida came to India to select 8 boys and girls between the ages of 13 and 15 to take to the US on a scholarship. The first batch was selected and is preparing to undertake the scholarship at IMG Florida. More scholarships will be offered with the aim of launching India's first professional league in four years.

One of the first people to have been accepted to the IMG Reliance program, Satnam Singh Bhamara, had also declared to go for the 2015 NBA draft while coming straight out of the IMG Reliance program as a post-graduate. When Bhamara was selected by the Dallas Mavericks as the 52nd pick of the draft, he would be the first player to have been drafted directly out of high school without any additional international, college, or D-League competition since Amir Johnson back in 2005.

=== India Rising ===
Founded as best Indian diaspora basketball team, they participate at various international events, such as The Basketball Tournament.

== See also ==
- Sport in India
- Mizoram Super League
- Indian Panthers
