= Amritpal Singh (basketball) =

Indian basketball player (born 1991)

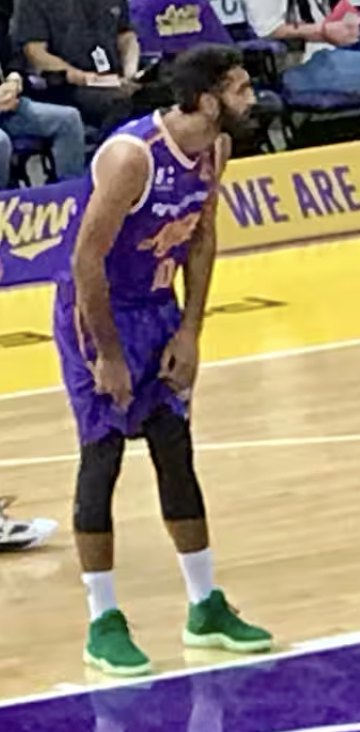
- Singh with the Sydney Kings in 2017.

Personal information
- Born: 5 January 1991 (age 35) Ganna Pind, Punjab, India
- Listed height: 216 cm (7 ft 1 in)
- Listed weight: 110 kg (243 lb)

Career information
- High school: Ludhiana Basketball Academy, Maharaja Ranjit Singh Police Public School
- NBA draft: 2013: undrafted
- Playing career: 2010–2019
- Position: Center
- Number: 10

Career history
- 2010–2011: Westerners Railway Mumbai
- 2015: ONGC Uttarakhand Dehradoon
- 2015–2016: Tokyo Excellence
- 2016: ONGC Uttarakhand Dehradoon
- 2017: Pune Peshwas
- 2017–2018: Sydney Kings
- 2019: Punjab

Career highlights
- NBDL Champion (2016); National Basketball Championship winner (2019)
Medals
Representing India
Lusofonia Games
Gold medal – first place	2014 India	Team

Amritpal Singh (born January 5, 1991) is an Indian professional basketball player who represents Punjab in the National Basketball Championship. In the past, he played for the Yokohama Excellence of the B.League, ONGC FC, and Pune Peshwas of India, as well as the Sydney Kings of the Australian National Basketball League. Singh, along with Amjyot Singh, became the first ever Indian basketball players to sign a professional contract abroad.

== Early life ==
“I often get requests for selfies when I am in public, but that’s because of my height,” he shared lightly.

Amritpal Singh was born on January 5, 1991, in Fattuwal village, Ganna Pind, Punjab, which is near Rayya, Amritsar. Singh comes from a family of farmers. He began playing basketball in 2009, after playing kabaddi as a youth. In March 2010, he joined the Ludhiana Basketball Academy. While studying at the Maharaja Ranjit Singh Police Public School in Phillaur, Singh would begin to take basketball seriously at the age of 17. Due to his naturally towering height, people would ask to take photos with him.

== Professional career ==
=== Tokyo Excellence (2015-2016) ===
In August 2015, Amritpal Singh signed with Tokyo Excellence of Japan's National Basketball Development League (NBDL). After putting up impressive performances in the BJ Challenge Summer League from June to August playing for the Hyogo Impulse team, Singh secured a one-year contract with the Tokyo team. In March 2016, he helped Tokyo Excellence win the 2015–16 NBDL Championship.

=== Sydney Kings (2017-2018) ===
In April 2017, Singh impressed a number of teams at the NBL Draft Combine in Melbourne. He participate in the combine alongside fellow Indian players Amjyot Singh, Yadwinder Singh and Vishesh Bhriguvanshi. Two months later, Singh was invited to join the Sydney Kings for a tournament in China, known as the Atlas Challenge 2017.

On 30 August 2017, Singh signed with the Sydney Kings for the 2017–18 NBL season, becoming the first Indian-born player to be signed by an Australian NBL team. In 24 games, he averaged 2.1 points and 1.4 rebounds per game.

== National team career ==
Singh made his debut for the Indian national team in 2011 at the FIBA Asia Championship. He has since competed at the 2013 FIBA Asia Championship, 2014 FIBA Asia Cup, 2015 FIBA Asia Championship, 2016 FIBA Asia Challenge, 2016 FIBA Asia Champions Cup and 2017 FIBA Asia Cup. At the 2016 FIBA Asia Challenge in Iran, Singh averaged 18 points and 10 rebounds per game.

== Personal life ==
Singh is now a Punjab sub-inspector, while maintaining his career as a basketball player. He is a proud follower of his Sikh tradition, as he is seen wearing a patka during his basketball games before it got banned, and he was forced to cut his hair to play, which to him was a "decision that was not easy to make".

=== Legal issues ===
In November 2019, Singh, along with Amjyot Singh and Arshpreet Bhullar, were allegedly involved in a roadside scuffle in Bengaluru. Due to the issue, the three were detained in prison for a couple hours before being subsequently released. While Singh was not a major contributor to the issue, he was still given a warning.

In Bengaluru, February 16, 2020, during the national team's preparatory camp for the FIBA 3x3 Tokyo Olympic qualifiers, traces of an illegal substance, Terbutaline were found in Singh's urine sample, which caused and led to Singh being suspended by NADA until May 19, 2020.

== See also ==
- Patka in sports
- Notable players of India's National Basketball Championship
