= 2022–23 INBL season =

- Association: Basketball Federation of India
- League: Indian National Basketball League
- Duration: 16 October 2022 – 15 January 2023
- Number of teams: 6

Regular season
- Top seed: Chennai Heat
- Season MVP: Baladhaneshwar Poiyamozhi (Chennai)
- Top scorer: Kanwar Singh (Chandigarh)

Playoffs
- Finals champions: Chennai Heat
- Runners-up: Bengaluru Kings
- Finals MVP: Maharaja Kumar (Chennai)

Seasons
- 2025 →

The 2022–23 INBL season was the inaugural season of the Indian National Basketball League, the newly established professional basketball league in India. The season began on 16 October 2022 and ended on 15 January 2023. Chennai Heat won the championship.

== Regular season ==
Pos	Team	Pld	W	L	PF	PA	PD	Pts	Qualification or relegation
1	Chennai Heat	15	13	2	1335	1116	+219	28	Qualification to playoff semifinals
2	Bengaluru Kings	15	8	7	1229	1195	+34	23	Qualification to playoff semifinals
3	Chandigarh Warriors	15	8	7	1243	1210	+33	23	Qualification to playoff quarterfinals
4	Kochi Tigers	15	6	9	1143	1238	−95	21	Qualification to playoff quarterfinals
5	Delhi Drillers	15	6	9	1224	1218	+6	21	Qualification to playoff quarterfinals
6	Mumbai Titans	15	4	11	1099	1296	−197	19	Qualification to playoff quarterfinals

Source: Asia-basket.com

== Playoffs ==
Quarterfinals
4	Delhi	84
5	Kochi	78
3	Chandigarh	71
6	Mumbai	79

Semifinals
1	Chennai	72
4	Delhi	67
2	Bengaluru	93
6	Mumbai	72

Finals
1	Chennai	91
2	Bengaluru	74
