= Ambati =

Ambati (Telugu: అంబాటి) is a Telugu surname. Notable people with the surname include:

- Ambati Brahmanaiah (1939–2013), Indian politician
- Ambati Prudhvi Reddy (born 1996), Indian basketball player
- Ambati Rambabu (born 1956), Indian politician
- Ambati Rayudu (born 1985), Indian cricketer
- Balamurali Ambati (born 1977), Indian-American ophthalmologist, educator, and researcher
