= National Basketball Championship (men) =

Basketball tournament

- Sport: Basketball
- Founded: 1948
- Country: India
- Most recent champion: Tamil Nadu (2nd title) (2024)
- Broadcasters: SportsCast India; BFI (YouTube)
- Level on pyramid: 1 (1948–2022)

The National Basketball Championship is an inter-state men's national level basketball tournament, held by the Basketball Federation of India, governing body of basketball in India. The competition is contested among the regional state teams affiliated under the BFI.

The league was the first tier of basketball in the country, but later changed to the 2nd and even 3rd tier (since 2023).

== 2019 edition ==
2019 marked the 70th time the Indian Senior National Basketball Championship was held. It took place in the Guru Nanak Indoor Stadium.

Punjab won against Tamil Nadu 93-75. The team consisted of Amritpal Singh, Amjyot Singh and Princepal Singh for Punjab and, Jeevanantham Pandi and Aravind Annadurai were among the top adversaries fot Tamil Nadu.

In the semifinals, Punjab’s team secured a 79-67 win over Uttarakhand and Tamil Nadu secured a 65-63 win against Indian Railways.

== Championships ==
Year	Champion	Runner-up	Ref.
1948	Mysore	United Provinces	
2017	Uttarakhand		
2018	Tamil Nadu		
2019	Punjab	Tamil Nadu	
2020	Punjab		
2023	Tamil Nadu	Railways	
2024	Tamil Nadu	Punjab	

== Notable players ==
- Set a club record or won an individual award as a professional player

- Played at least one official international match for his senior national team at any time

- (India) Aravind Annadurai
- (India) Ravi Bhardwaj
- (India) Arshpreet Bhullar
- (India) Muin Bek Hafeez
- (India) Nikhil Kumar
- (India) Jeevanantham Pandi
- (India) Amjyot Singh
- (India) Amritpal Singh
- (India) Prashant Singh Rawat
- (India) Princepal Singh

== See also ==
- Mizoram Super League
- 3BL
- UBA Pro Basketball League
- Indian National Basketball League
- Elite Pro Basketball League
- WASL
