= Princepal Singh =

Indian basketball player

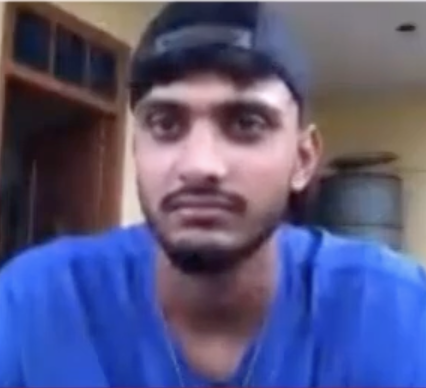
- Singh in 2020

No. 1 – Hou Chon
- Position: Power forward / center
- League: EASL

Personal information
- Born: 3 January 2001 (age 25) Punjab, India
- Listed height: 2.06 m (6 ft 9 in)
- Listed weight: 100 kg (220 lb)

Career information
- NBA draft: 2021: undrafted
- Playing career: 2019–present

Career history
- 2019: BA Centre of Excellence
- 2021: NBA G League Ignite
- 2023: Mumbai Stars
- 2025: Punjab Warriors
- 2025: IHC Apes
- 2026–present: Hou Chon

Career highlights
- SABA Under-16 Championship MVP (2017)
Medals
Men's basketball
Representing India
SABA Under-16 Championship
| Gold medal – first place | 2017 Nepal | Team |

Princepal Singh Bajwa (Punjabi: ਪਿ੍ੰਸਪਾਲ ਸਿੰਘ; born 3 January 2001) is an Indian professional basketball player for Hou Chon of the East Asia Super League (EASL). Listed at 2.06 m (6' 9") and 100 kg (221 lb), he plays the power forward and center positions. Singh previously played for the NBA G League Ignite.

== Early life and career ==
Singh is a native of Dera Baba Nanak, Punjab, India, and grew up playing volleyball. In 2014, he travelled to Ludhiana to try out for a volleyball academy but instead drew the attention of Jaipal Singh, a coach at the Ludhiana Basketball Academy (LBA). Standing 1.98 m (6 ft 6 in) at the time, he soon joined the LBA and learned how to play basketball from Jaipal Singh. In 2016, Singh earned a three-year full scholarship, worth $75,000, to play at SPIRE Institute and Academy in Geneva, Ohio but was unable to join the program after his visa was rejected twice.

Singh trained at the NBA Academy India in New Delhi for 18 months, before being called up to the NBA Global Academy, a training center at the Australian Institute of Sport in Canberra, in May 2017. Singh trained at the Global Academy on a two-year contract. He played seven games for the BA Centre of Excellence in the Australian NBL1 during the 2019 season.

In October 2019, Singh was named the most valuable player (MVP) at the Indian Junior National Championship after leading Punjab to the title and scoring 40 points against Rajasthan in the final. In December 2019, he helped Punjab win the Indian Senior National Basketball Championship. In January 2020, he helped Punjab win the gold medal in the under-21 category of the Khelo India Youth Games.

== Professional career ==
=== NBA G League Ignite (2021) ===
On 28 July 2020, Singh signed a one-year contract with the NBA G League Ignite, a developmental team affiliated with the NBA G League. He became the first NBA Academy India graduate to sign a professional contract. He played sparingly during the 2021 G League hub season, averaging 2.3 points in four games.

Singh joined the Sacramento Kings for the 2021 NBA Summer League, helping the team win the Summer League title. He was selected by the Stockton Kings with the fifth pick of the third round of the 2021 NBA G League draft.

=== New Zealand Breakers (2021–2022) ===
On 10 November 2021, Singh signed with the New Zealand Breakers of the Australian National Basketball League to a two-year development player contract. He parted ways with the Breakers in January 2022 before playing in a game for the team.

=== Mumbai Stars (2023) ===
In October 2022, Singh suffered a career-threatening back injury while training in the United States. He recovered in time to play for the Mumbai Stars in the Elite Pro Basketball League in March 2023.

=== Punjab Warriors (2025) ===
Singh played for the Punjab Warriors in the 2025 INBL Pro season. In seven games, he averaged 5.3 points and 4.3 rebounds per game.

In March 2025, Singh signed with the Indian Panthers of the New Zealand NBL for the 2025 season. He never debuted, with the Panthers folding mid-season.

=== IHC Apes (2025) ===
In October 2025, Singh played six games for IHC Apes of the Mongolian League.

== National team career ==
=== Junior national team ===
In September 2017, Singh led India to the gold medal at the SABA Under-16 Championship in Kathmandu, Nepal. He was named the tournament's MVP after scoring 20 points in a 131–50 win over Bhutan in his final game. In April 2018, Singh competed at the FIBA Under-16 Asian Championship in Foshan, China, averaging 22.7 points and 13 rebounds per game. At the 2018 FIBA Under-18 Asian Championship in Nonthaburi, Thailand, he averaged 15.5 points, 9.8 rebounds and 3.3 blocks per game as the captain of the Indian team.

=== Senior national team ===
In December 2018, Singh made his debut for the Indian senior national team at the Super Kung Sheung Cup International Championship in Hong Kong. In February 2020, he was selected to represent India for Window 1 of the 2021 FIBA Asia Cup qualification stage. In his first game, on 21 February, Singh recorded three points, five rebounds and two assists in 12 minutes in a 68–67 loss to Bahrain.

== Career statistics ==
Legend
| GP | Games played | GS | Games started | MPG | Minutes per game |
| FG% | Field goal percentage | 3P% | 3-point field goal percentage | FT% | Free throw percentage |
| RPG | Rebounds per game | APG | Assists per game | SPG | Steals per game |
| BPG | Blocks per game | PPG | Points per game | **Bold** | Career high |

=== NBA G League ===
==== Regular season ====
| Year | Team | GP | GS | MPG | FG% | 3P% | FT% | RPG | APG | SPG | BPG | PPG |
|---|---|---|---|---|---|---|---|---|---|---|---|---|
| 2020–21 | NBA G League | 4 | 0 | 6.3 | .500 | 1.000 | .500 | 1.0 | .0 | .3 | .0 | 2.3 |
| Career | | 4 | 0 | 6.3 | .500 | 1.000 | .500 | 1.0 | .0 | .3 | .0 | 2.3 |

==== Playoffs ====
| Year | Team | GP | GS | MPG | FG% | 3P% | FT% | RPG | APG | SPG | BPG | PPG |
|---|---|---|---|---|---|---|---|---|---|---|---|---|
| 2020–21 | NBA G League | 1 | 0 | 2.0 | – | – | – | .0 | .0 | .0 | .0 | .0 |
| Career | | 1 | 0 | 2.0 | – | – | – | .0 | .0 | .0 | .0 | .0 |

== Personal life ==
Singh's father, Gurmej Singh, is an electrician. His father stands 1.83 m (6 ft 0 in) and his mother, Hardeep Kaur, stands 1.78 m (5 ft 10 in).

=== Endorsements ===
On August 3, 2026, Singh signed with Indian agency Sports Dunk.
