= Gurvinder Singh Gill =

Indian basketball player (born 1996)

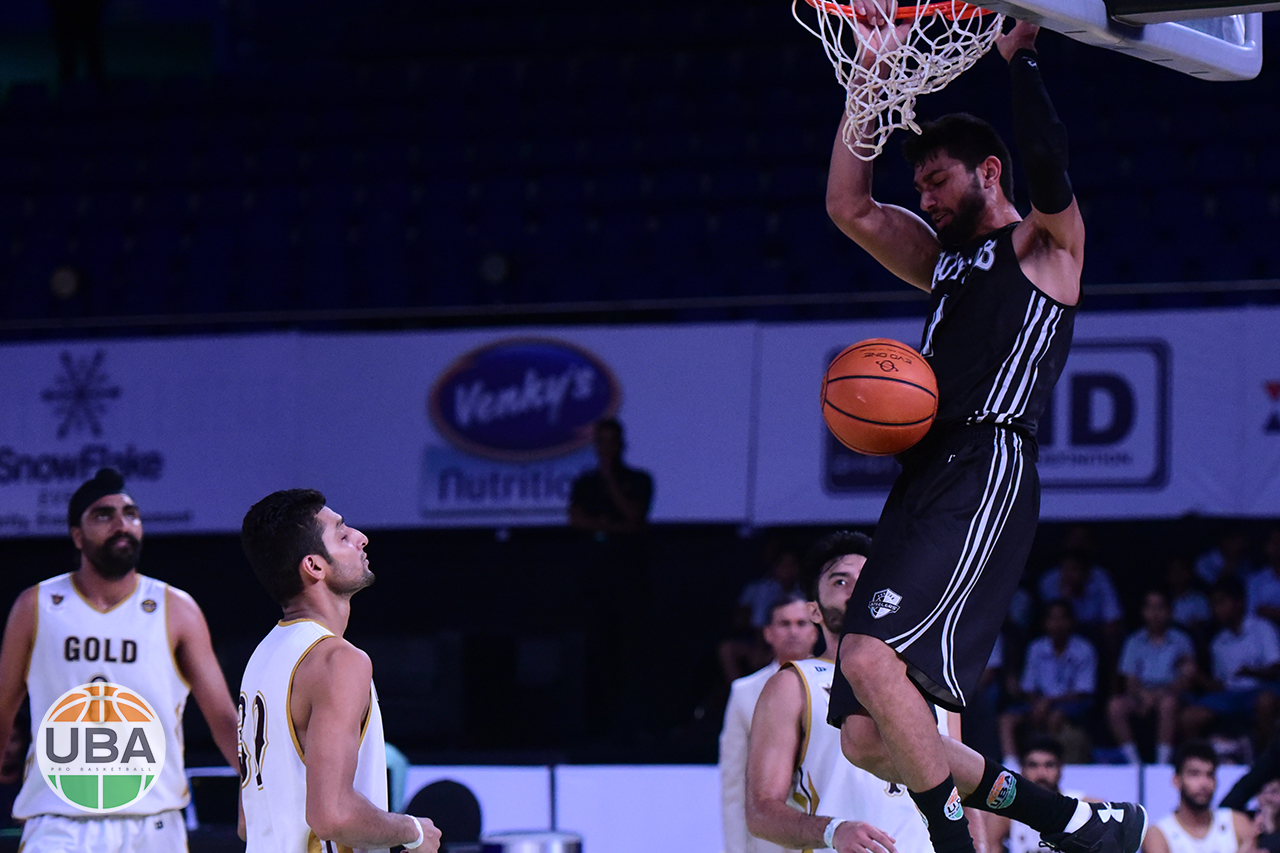

Punjab Steelers
- Position: Forward
- League: UBA Pro Basketball League

Personal information
- Born: January 21, 1996 (age 30) Moga, Punjab
- Listed height: 6 ft 7 in (2.01 m)
- Listed weight: 220 lb (100 kg)

Career information
- NBA draft: 2018: undrafted
- Playing career: 2015–present

Career history
- 2015–present: Punjab Steelers (India)

Gurvinder Singh Gill (also known as "Garry Gill") (born January 21, 1996) is an Indian professional basketball player.

He currently plays for the Punjab Steelers of India's UBA Pro Basketball League. He was a member of India's national basketball team at the 2015 FIBA Asia Championship in Changsha, Hunan, China.
