= Ambati Prudhvi Reddy =

Indian basketball player (born 1996)

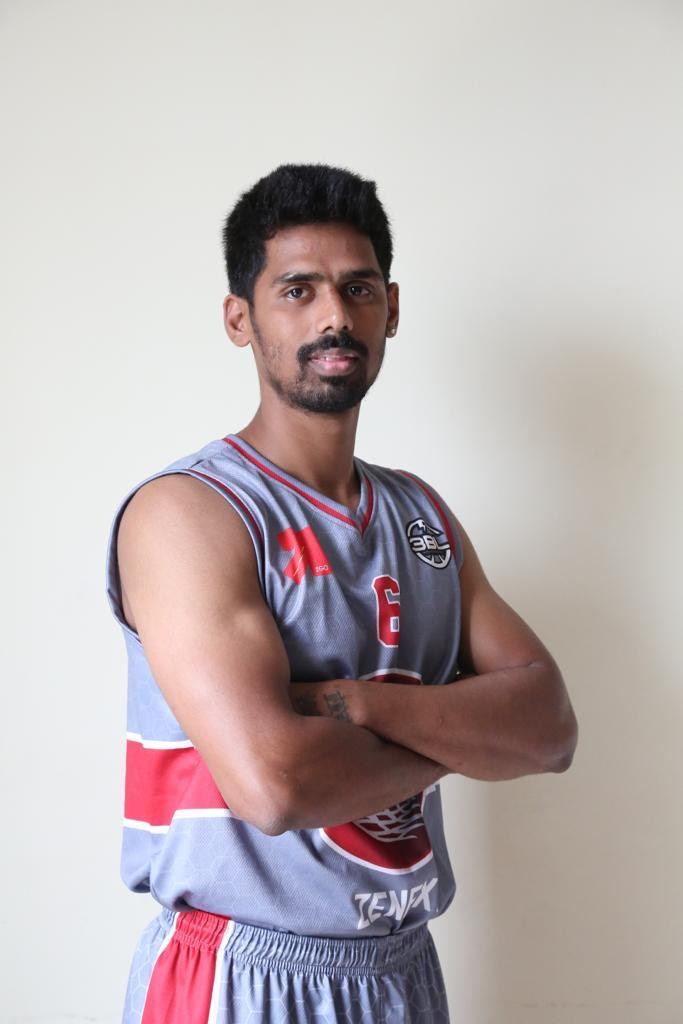
- Ambati Reddy in 2022

No. 6 – Telangana state's Basketball team
- Position: Point guard

Personal information
- Born: January 23, 1996 (age 30) Telangana, India
- Listed height: 6 ft 2 in (1.88 m)

Ambati Prudhvi Reddy (born 23 January 1996) is an Indian basketball player from the state of Telangana. Standing at six feet and two inches, he plays the point guard position.

Reddy has received professional training and played at the Europe Basketball Academy. He is also currently the captain of Telangana state's Basketball Team. He is playing for the Senior Men's Indian team as a starting PG and also for the 3x3bl professional league for the Delhi Hoopers.

== Early life and education ==
Born in Siripuram village of Ramannapet mandal in Telangana's Nalgonda district, Ambati Prudhvi Reddy focused initially on cricket and he was the 12th man in the school squad. His attention later turned towards basketball since he felt that his athletic physique was more suited for the game. During his stint as a student at St Mary's College in Hyderabad, he started practicing professional Basketball. Reddy is a proud follower of Hinduism.

== Playing career ==
A resident of Hyderabad, Ambati Prudhvi Reddy posted his gaming sessions on YouTube and soon he received an invitation from the Europe Basketball Academy based in Barcelona, Spain to play professional basketball. This marked the beginning of his basketball career in 2013. The head of EBA, Srjdan Premovic, helped him in extending his training stint from three months to a year in Spain, where he got an opportunity to compete with leading talent from across the world.

After returning to India, he achieved success at the 2014 South Asian Basketball Association championship in Bengaluru. In the meanwhile, Prudhvi's game was noticed by an American prep school coach in Barcelona where ex-NBA and D-Leaguers played the summers. The coach of Christian Life Centre, Houston invited him to the Christian Life Academy in Houston, Texas where he spent a year for intense training.

The experience and exposure he gained abroad helped Ambati Prudhvi Reddy in improving his game. With the UBA making inroads in India, there was more potential for his sporting career. He was selected by the Mumbai Challengers on an annual contract in the UBA's second season. Prudhvi missed the NBA D League, finishing second to Palpreet Brar in a nationwide screening. He was among the country's top 16 chosen by the UBA to visit the US after Seasons two and three, where he averaged 20 and 25 points per game. Ambati Prudhvi Reddy is part of the Mumbai team, with playoffs in the ongoing UBA Pro Basketball League.

== Early achievements ==
- Played 3 ICSE Nationals and Captained the Team Twice (2008–2010)
- Represented Hyderabad district in all age groups – Under-14, Under-16 & Under-18 Seniors (2009–2017)
- Represented the state team in all age groups from 2009 to 2017. He was the captain for every age group.

== Professional achievements ==
- Selected for U14 Indian camp and was in the Top 10 for the IMP US CAMP (2009–2010)
- Selected for U18 Juniors Indian camp and he was the 13th player for the FIBA TEAM in 2012
- Represented the Indian team in SABA and won the championship in 2015
- NBA conducted a selection trail to select one player to represent in NBA D league and he secured the second spot
- Announced the Best PG in U21 age group
- Chosen to play in UBA from Season 2 for Mumbai challengers and won the Season 4, including server MVP's
- Selected among the Top 12 to represent UBA in the US
