= Hawla Indoor Stadium =

Sports venue in Aizawl, India

- Pitar te tlang stadium
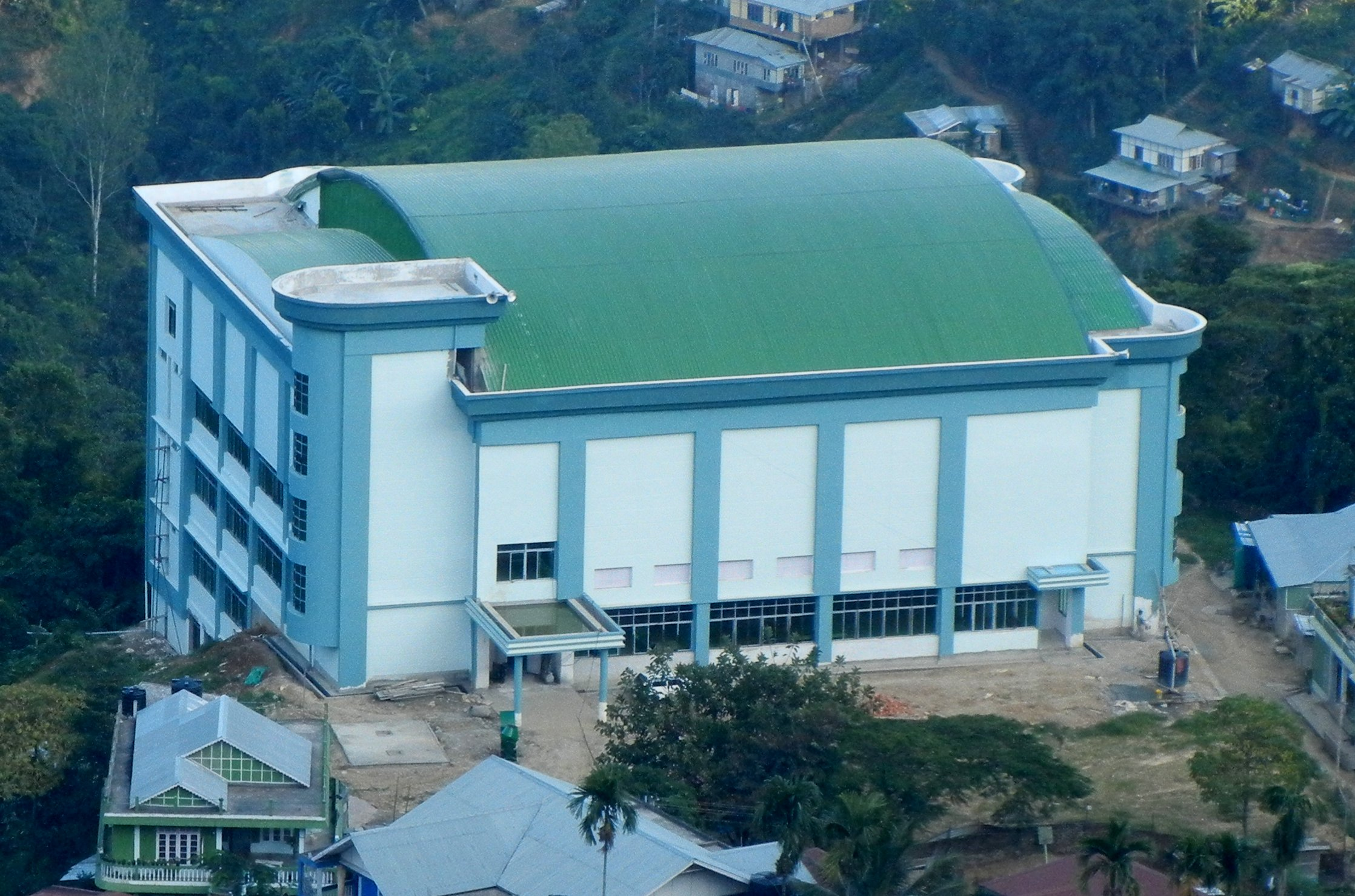
- Full name: Hawla Indoor Stadium
- Location: Aizawl, Mizoram, India
- Capacity: 3,000

Hawla Indoor Stadium an is indoor stadium in Aizawl, Mizoram, India. It is used mainly for basketball competition Mizoram Super League.

== Stadium ==
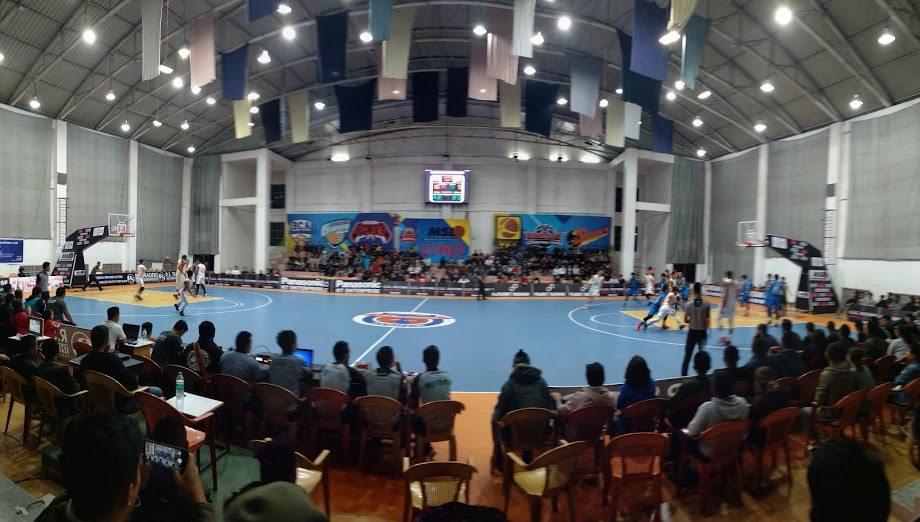
MSL game in Hawla Stadium

The stadium has a seating capacity of about 3,000 spectators. The First Floor of the Stadium can be used for basketball and badminton while the ground floor has gymnasium. The Basement has facilities for martial arts and table tennis. Mizoram Super League, India's oldest professional basketball league is played in this stadium.

== History ==
This Stadium was inaugurated by Pu R Lalzirliana, Home Minister of Mizoram on 19 March 2012. The construction started in 2008. Hawla Indoor Stadium was one of the venues for the Northeast India Games.
