= Rohit Bakshi (entrepreneur) =

Indian entrepreneur

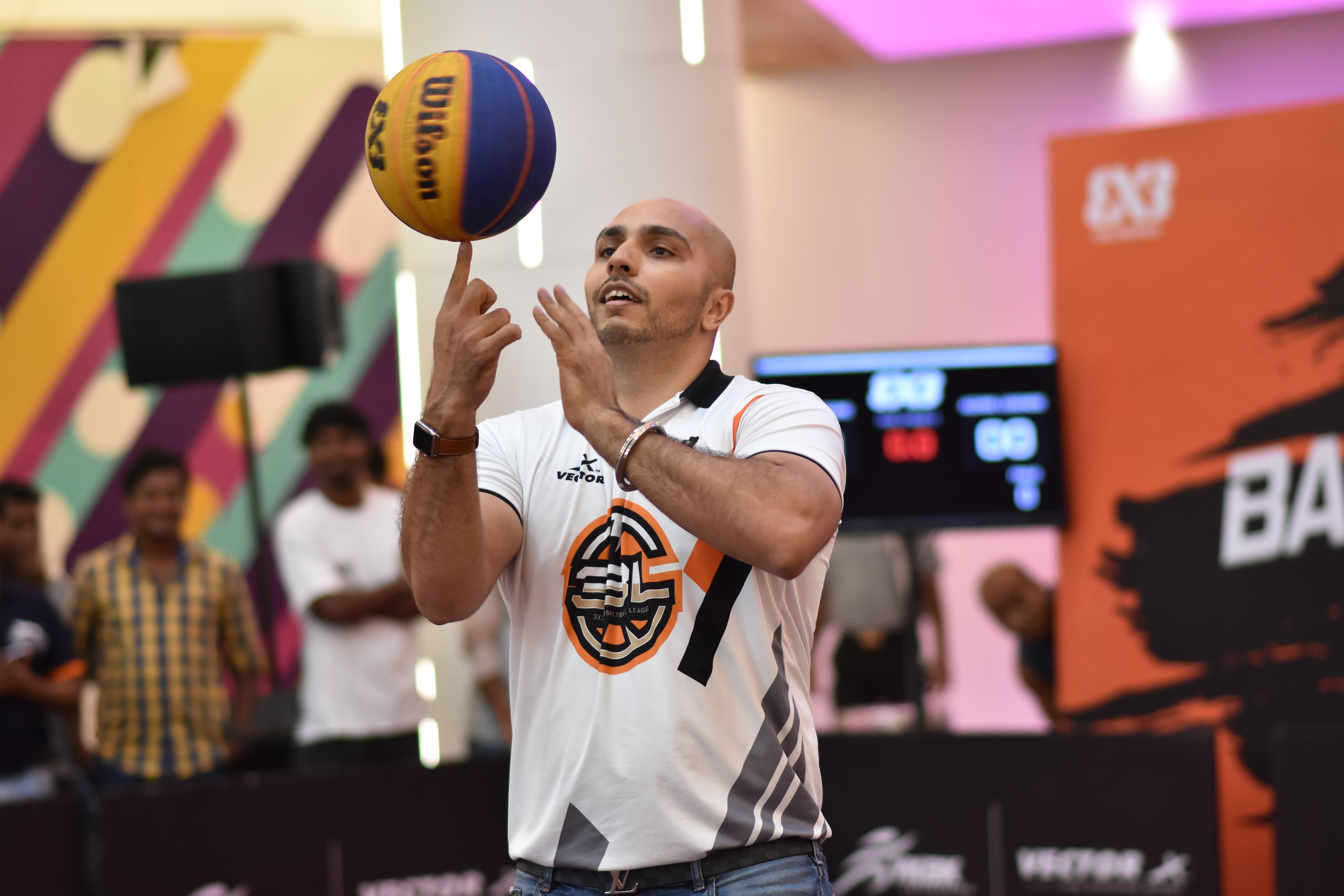
- Born: 14 February 1982 (age 44); Delhi, India
- Occupation: Entrepreneur
- Employer: YKBK Enterprise Private Limited
- Known for: CEO, YKBK Enterprise Private Limited; Commissioner, 3BL

Rohit Bakshi (born 14 February 1982) is an Indian entrepreneur and a former 3x3 basketball player from Delhi. He is the CEO of YKBK Enterprise Private Limited and commissioner of 3BL, the FIBA-affiliated 3x3 league in the Indian subcontinent.

== Early life ==
Rohit Bakshi was born in Delhi, and he grew up in Nagoya, Japan. He has played in the Japanese 3x3 league. Rohit returned to India in 2009 to set up a professional basketball league.

== Career ==
In 2016, Rohit started Agleymina.EXE, a 3x3 basketball team in Japan. They won the 3x3 Japan Premier League Championship title and lost in the final of the World Tour Championship. In the following year, Rohit Bakshi set up a 3x3 Pro Basketball League in India named 3BL, which is recognized by FIBA.
