= Mumbai Challengers =

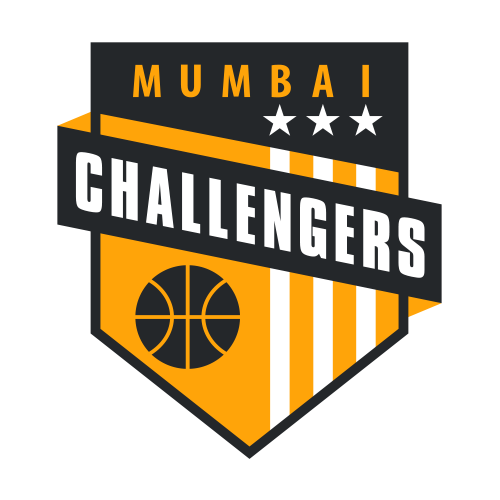
- Leagues: UBA Pro Basketball League
- Founded: 2015; 10 years ago
- Location: Mumbai, Maharastra, India
- Head coach: Jora Singh Gulia
- Championships: 1 (2017)

The Mumbai Challengers was an Indian professional basketball team based in Mumbai, Maharashtra. The Challengers last competed in the United Basketball Alliance as a member of the North Division along with three other teams. They are one of two UBA teams located in Maharashtra, the other is Pune Peshwas. The team was established in 2015 with the inception of the UBA.

The Challengers won their first UBA Championship in Season 4 after defeating the Punjab Steelers in the semifinals and the Bengaluru Beast in the finals series.

The only player that has played all four UBA Seasons for the Challengers is Karanpal Singh, while Jagdeep Singh, Nikhil Kumar, Ambati Prudhvi Reddy and Dildar have all been on the roster since season 2.

== Season-by-season record ==
UBA Season	W	L	Finish	Playoffs
Season 1 (2015)	0	6	4th, North	Did not qualify
Season 2 (2016)	4	3	2nd, North	Lost in semifinal series 2-1
Season 3 (2016)	2	2	3rd, North	Lost play-in game
Season 4 (2017)	5	1	1st, North	Won Championship

== Players ==
Mumbai Challengers Season 4 roster

#	Name	Position	Nationality	Department
1	Harman Singh		(India)	Railways
6	Jagdeep Bains		(India)	Punjab
8	Alex Scales		(United States)	N/A
9	Prasanna Venkatesh		(India)	IOB
17	Prudhvi Reddy		(India)	Student
18	Inderbir Gill		(India)	Canada?
22	Jimmy Scroggins		(Canada)	N/A
24	Nikhil Kumar		(India)	Air Force
25	Karan Pal Singh		(India)	Student
40	Dildar Singh		(India)	Student
56	Jeevenathan		(India)	IOB
58	Ravinder Singh		(India)	Income Tax

== Prominent players ==
Name	Avg PPG (S1)	Avg PPG (S2)	Avg PPG (S3)	Avg PPG (S4)	Total Avg PPG
Alex Scales	N/A	N/A	N/A	40.2	40.2
Jimmy Scroggins	N/A	N/A	N/A	24.2	24.2
Inderbir Gill	N/A	N/A	N/A	16.3	16.3
Jagdeep Bains	N/A	11.6	22.3	13.6	15.8
Nikhil Kumar	N/A	15.1	12.0	10.8	12.6
Prudhvi Reddy	N/A	7.2	10.8	7.5	8.5
Prasanna Venkatesh	N/A	N/A	N/A	8.2	8.2
Karanpal Singh	30.5	11.3	1.3	3.4	11.6
Dildar Singh	N/A	1.9	8.0	5.0	5.0
Jeevanathan	N/A	N/A	N/A	4.2	4.2

== Head coaches ==
UBA season	Name
Season 1	Linesh
Season 2	PC Antony
Season 3	Jora Singh Gulia
Season 4	Jora Singh Gulia

== Assistant coaches ==
UBA season	Name
Season 1	N/A
Season 2	Sudeep Bose
Season 3	Sudeep Bose
Season 4	Sudeep Bose
