= Elite Pro Basketball League =

Indian basketball league

Elite Pro Basketball League (EPBL)
- Founded: 2022; 3 years ago
- First season: TBA
- Country: India
- Number of teams: 16
- Level on pyramid: 1
- CEO: Sunny Bhandarkar
- Website: EPBLeague.com

Elite Pro Basketball League (EPBL) was a professional franchise basketball league in India. Elite Pro Basketball Pvt Ltd was incorporated in February 2022 under the directorship of Sunny Bhandarkar and Pranav Prabhu. It is owned and operated by Elite Sports India (ESI).

Elite Pro Basketball League replaced UBA Pro Basketball League from 2022.

== Teams ==
The league currently has sixteen franchised teams.

| Team | Representing city/state |
|---|---|
| Ahmedabad Aces | Ahmedabad |
| Bengaluru Stallions | Bengaluru |
| Chandigarh Conquerors | Chandigarh |
| Chennai Turbos | Chennai |
| Delhi Dominators | Delhi |
| Eastern Tigers | Kolkata |
| Goa Waves | Goa |
| Hyderabad Hoops | Hyderabad |
| Jaipur Giants | Jaipur |
| Kochi Pachers | Kochi |
| Lucknow Swarm | Lucknow |
| Mumbai Stars | Mumbai |
| Nagpur Knights | Nagpur |
| Pune Pythons | Pune |
| Punjab Gladiators | Punjab |
| Surat Diamonds | Surat |

Location of EPBL teams

== Try-outs ==
EPBL's first try-out took place at Kotla Vijaya Bhaskara Reddy Indoor Stadium, Hyderabad on 12 May 2022. Over 250 basketball players took part in the try-out, and 150 players were selected by the twelve franchises which includes players from the Indian basketball team including Jagdeep Singh Bains, Pratham Singh, K. Ravikumar, Vinay Kaushik, Rachit Singh, Prakash Mishra and Arshdeep Singh.

Jaipur Giants have been acquired by Bradshaw Capital, an American company led by former Montblanc USA CEO, Bill Brown.

== Top players ==
In June 2022 the league announced its first round of marquee player signings for some of the participating franchises.

| Player | Team |
|---|---|
| Jagdeep Bains | Mumbai Stars |
| Pratham Singh | Pune Pythons |
| Prakash Mishra | Jaipur Giants |
| Basil Philip | Kochi Packers |
| Vinay Kaushik | Chandigarh Conquerors |
| Arvind Krishna | Hyderabad Hoops |
| Ram Gopal | Lucknow Swarm |
| Ravikumar | Chennai Turbos |
| Rachit Singh | Punjab Gladiators |
| Karan Pal Singh | Ahmedabad Aces |
| Arshdeep Singh | Delhi Dominators |
| Visu Palani | Bengaluru Stallions |

== Board members ==
- CEO – Sunny Bhandarkar
- COO – Pranav Prabhu
- Chief advisor – David Pross

== See also ==
- Basketball Federation of India
- UBA Pro Basketball League
- Indian National Basketball League
- 3x3 Pro Basketball League
- West Asia Super League
- National Basketball Championship
- Mizoram Super League
- Sports in India
