= United Basketball Alliance of India =

UBA Pro Basketball League
- Company type: Delaware Corporation
- Founded: 2015
- Website: www.ubaindia.com

The United Basketball Alliance of India, Inc. (UBA India) was "a professional basketball league with teams based in key cities across India for fans of all ages".

UBA India was incorporated on 28 September 2015 as a Delaware Corporation. With file number 5835701.

UBA India signed various partnership deals with major broadcasters. Including Ten Sports, which is the largest sports network in India. They agreed to broadcast UBA India live matches. Ten Sports is owned by the Sony Pictures Networks India. One of Hollywood's major multi-billion dollar film studios.

Rajesh Sethi, the Global CEO of Ten Sports stated to the press, “We are delighted to partner with UBA for India’s first Professional Basketball League. I am confident that UBA will change the face of Indian Professional Basketball forever.”

The 2015 inaugural season of UBA India witnessed celebrities such as Abhishek Bachchan and Evelyn Sharma putting in a couple of appearances. Also the Union Minister of State for Parliamentary Affairs, Mr Mukhtar Abbas Naqvi as well as Telangana State’s Sports Minister, Mr Tigula Padma Rao Goud. Who both accepted the proposal to attend a basketball game in the capacity of special guests.

== See also ==
- UBA Pro Basketball League
