= Akilan Pari =

Indian basketball player (born 1989)

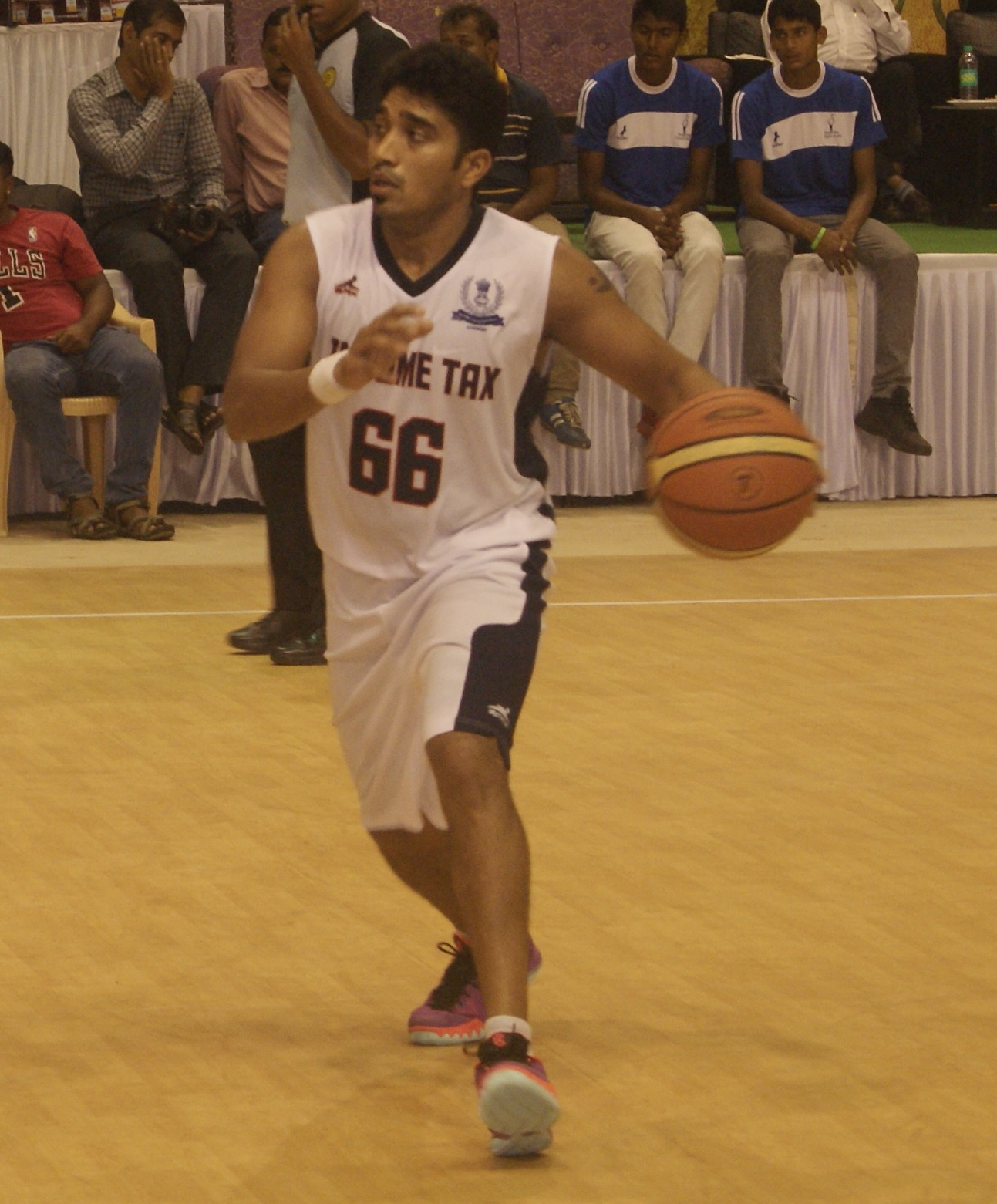
- Akilan Pari with Income Tax in 2015

Punjab Steelers
- Position: Point guard
- League: UBA Pro Basketball League

Personal information
- Born: 20 July 1989 (age 37) Chennai, Tamil Nadu
- Listed height: 5 ft 10 in (1.78 m)

Career information
- NBA draft: 2010: undrafted
- Playing career: 2010–present

Career history
- 2017–present: Punjab Steelers

Akilan Pari (born 20 July 1989) is an Indian professional basketball player. He currently plays for the Punjab Steelers of India's UBA Pro Basketball League.

== Early career ==
Pari already made a name for himself as a youth player. He captained Tamil Nadu's official state lineups for the U-13, U-16, and U-18 (junior) and senior men's level.

== Sprite Uncontainable Game ==
During the 2013 NBA All-Star Game, Akilan Pari was selected to play at the Sprite Uncontainable Game, where he was coached by Omri Casspi and Serge Ibaka.

As of 2018, he has been labelled as one of India's best basketball players because of his passing and ball handling skills, and because of complicated engagement rules, missed a crucial playoff game against Lebanon, a game which India lost because of his absence.

== National team career ==
He is a member of India's national basketball team since 2014. As of 2018, he serves as team captain of India's national basketball team.
