= Chennai Slam =

Indian basketball team

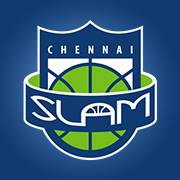
- Division: South Division (UBA)
- League: UBA Pro Basketball League
- Founded: 2015
- Arena: Jawaharlal Nehru Stadium (Chennai)
- Location: Chennai, Tamil Nadu
- Team colors: Blue, white
- Head coach: Prasanna Menon
- Championships: 2 (2015, 2016)

Chennai Slam was an UBA Pro Basketball League franchise based in Chennai, Tamil Nadu which began to play in 2015. They were the only team who has won the league twice.

== History ==
On 17 July 2015 at Gachibowli Indoor Stadium, Chennai Slam started their first UBA Pro Basketball League season with a 65–61 loss to Hyderabad Sky, but made a comeback with four victories. The team finished its 6-game regular season in second place.

In the semifinals, Chennai Slam won over Punjab Steelers 92–77. They won the first season of the UBA Pro Basketball League by beating Pune Peshwas 81–49 in the finals.

== Players ==
Chennai Slam season 4 roster

#	Name	Weight(Kg)	Height
1	Agu Chukwunanu	75	5 ft 9 in
7	Krish Mishra	87	6 ft 0 in
5	Ashutosh Rai	103	6 ft 5 in
9	Ameeth Khan	67	5 ft 10 in
11	Vignesh Prabhu	80	6 ft 0 in
21	Brendon Pineda	101	6 ft 4 in
30	Cammy Carmel	90	6 ft 2 in
31	Gopal Ram	110	6 ft 8 in
33	T.N. Bopanna	80	5 ft 8 in
34	Longji Gobum	124	6 ft 4 in
36	Rikin Pethani	105	6 ft 8 in
40	Jairam Jat	97	6 ft 4 in
