= Suman Sharma =

Indian basketball player

Personal information
- Born: 24 June 1958 (age 68) Amritsar, Punjab, India

Career history
- 1978 to 1984: India women's national basketball team

Career highlights
- ABC 1980 - Hong Kong; ABC 1982 - Tokyo (Captain); Asian Games 1982 - Delhi; ABC 1984 - Shanghai; Arjuna Award (1983); M.R.S. Award (1985)

Suman Sharma is a former Indian basketball player. She received the Arjuna Award in 1983 in basketball for her achievements in the field of sports. She was the first woman Arjuna awardee in basketball. Sharma is the first vice chairman of the Indian Basketball Players Association.
