= 3x3 Pro Basketball League =

3x3 basketball league in India

3x3 International Pro Basketball League
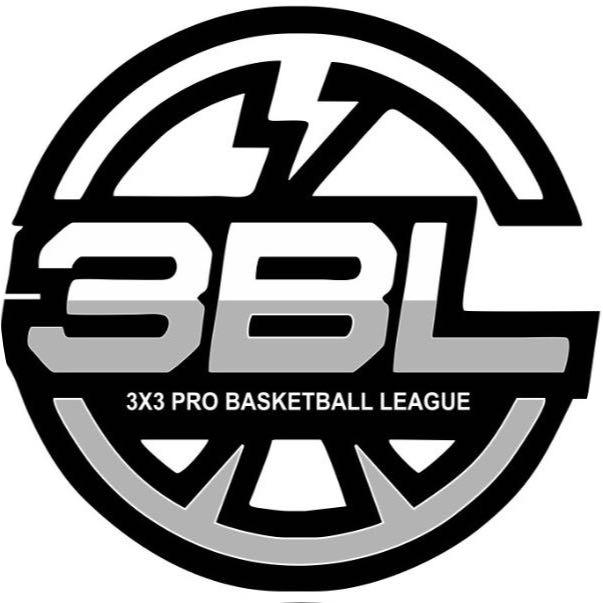
- Sport: Basketball
- Founded: 2017; 9 years ago
- First season: 2017
- Owner: YKBK Enterprise Private Limited
- CEO: Rohit Bakshi
- No. of teams: 12 Men & 6 Women
- Country: India (originally)
- Headquarters: Gurugram, Haryana
- Broadcasters: SonySix, SonyLIV
- Website: Official website

3x3 International Pro Basketball League was a men's and women's professional 3x3 basketball league founded in India. Founded in 2017, the competition currently consists of 12 teams in men's and 6 in women's league.

== History ==
3BL is managed by YKBK Enterprise Private Limited, a company registered and headquartered in Gurugram, Haryana. YKBK is the exclusive right holder of operating a Professional 3x3 Basketball League in the Indian subcontinent by FIBA, which includes six countries (India, Sri Lanka, Bangladesh, Nepal, Maldives and Bhutan). 3BL was founded by Rohit Bakshi. The first season of the league was played in Bengaluru, Delhi, Aizawl, Kolkata, Chennai, and Mumbai.

== Indian teams ==
There are currently 18 teams with international and Indian players, both men and women.

Men and Women 3BL teams. Green denotes a Men's team and Pink denotes a Women's team. Delhi has both Men's and Women's teams.

Men's
Teams	State/City
Ahmedabad Wingers	Ahmedabad
Aizawl Legends	Aizawl
Bangalore Machas	Bangalore
Chandigarh Challengers	Chandigarh
Chennai Icons	Chennai
Delhi Hoopers	Delhi
Goa Snipers	Goa
Gurugram Masters	Gurugram
Hyderabad Ballers	Hyderabad
Kolkata Warriors	Kolkata
Lucknow Ligers	Lucknow
Mumbai Heroes	Mumbai

Women's
Teams	State/City
Coimbatore Spunkies	Coimbatore
Delhi Divas	Delhi
Jaipur Regals	Jaipur
Kochi Stars	Kochi
Ludhiana Queens	Ludhiana
Pune Panthers	Pune

== Seasons ==
Season 1
Rank	Team	M	W	W%	PTS
1	Delhi Hoopers	30	27	90	580
2	Ahmedabad Wingers	26	16	62	415
3	Bangalore Machas	23	16	70	375
4	Mumbai Hustlers	21	10	48	310
5	Hyderabad Ballers	19	10	53	286
6	Aizawl Legends	18	7	39	251
7	Jaipur Regals	17	7	41	241
8	Chennai Icons	18	7	39	221
9	Kochi Knights	14	4	29	174
10	Goa Snipers	14	5	36	161
11	Chandigarh Beasts	15	3	20	153
12	Kolkata Warriors	13	1	8	121

Season 2 (Conference A)
Rank	Team	M	W	W%	PTS
1	Chandigarh Challengers (2)	10	7	70	197
2	Goa Snipers (5)	10	5	50	187
3	Delhi Hoopers (1)	11	5	45	175
4	Chennai Icon (4)	8	5	62	151
5	Aizawl Legends (6)	8	4	50	128
6	Bangalore Machas (3)	7	1	14	103

Conference B
Rank	Team	M	W	W%	PTS
1	Gurugram Masters (2)	12	11	92	247
2	Mumbai Heroes (1)	12	10	83	237
3	Kolkata Warriors (5)	9	3	33	153
4	Hyderabad Ballers (4)	7	1	14	116
5	Lucknow Ligers (3)	8	2	25	108
6	Ahmedabad Wingers (6)	6	0	0	84

Women
Rank	Team	M	W	W%	PTS
1	Kochi Stars (6)	10	7	70	160
2	Pune Panthers (4)	11	7	64	176
3	Coimbatore Spunkies (2)	10	6	60	165
4	Jaipur Regals (1)	9	4	44	141
5	Ludhiana Queens (5)	7	2	29	86
6	Delhi Divas (3)	7	1	14	61

== See also ==
- FIBA 3x3 World Tour
- UBA Pro Basketball League
- Elite Pro Basketball League
- INBL
- Mizoram Super League
- National Basketball Championship
- Sports in India
