= Delhi Capitals (basketball) =

- Leagues: UBA Pro Basketball League
- Founded: 2015
- Arena: Master Prithvi Nath Stadium
- Location: Delhi, India
- Team colors: Dark blue and orange
- Head coach: P. J. Sebastian
- Championships: 1 (Season 2)

Delhi Capitals was a professional basketball team based in Delhi, India. The team competed in the now-defunct UBA Pro Basketball League, which operated as one of the few professional basketball leagues in India during the mid-2010s. Established in 2015, the Capitals quickly rose to prominence, securing the championship title in the second season of the league in 2016.

The team played its home games at the Master Prithvi Nath Stadium, a venue located in the heart of Delhi. Coached by P. J. Sebastian, the Capitals were known for their athleticism and tactical play, combining Indian talent with international imports to challenge the top teams in the league.

== History ==
The Delhi Capitals were one of the eight founding franchises when the UBA Pro Basketball League launched in 2015. In the second season of the league, held in 2016, Delhi won the championship after defeating Chennai Slam in the final.

== Players ==
Note: Flags indicate national team eligibility at FIBA-sanctioned events. Players may hold other non-FIBA nationalities not displayed.

Delhi Capitals roster
Players
Coaches

Pos.	No.	Nat.	Name	Ht.	Wt.	Age
F	7	(India)	Hafeez, Muin Bek	1.90 m (6 ft 3 in)	75 kg (165 lb)	29 – 16 March 1996
G	30	(India)	Kaushik, Vinay	1.89 m (6 ft 2 in)	86 kg (190 lb)	34 – 30 August 1991
G	1	(India)	Kumar, Anil	1.86 m (6 ft 1 in)	73 kg (161 lb)	36 – 31 July 1989
F	41	(India)	Kumar, Ramesh	2.01 m (6 ft 7 in)	94 kg (207 lb)
G	5	(United States)	March, Ronald	1.96 m (6 ft 5 in)	79 kg (174 lb)	32 – 24 July 1993
G/F	13	(India)	Pratap, Ajay	1.93 m (6 ft 4 in)	87 kg (192 lb)
G	23	(India)	Rachit	1.86 m (6 ft 1 in)	82 kg (181 lb)	27 – 16 September 1998
G/F	3	(India)	Rathee, Sunil	1.95 m (6 ft 5 in)	75 kg (165 lb)	34 – 25 March 1991
G/F	25	(India)	Settu, Smithin	1.93 m (6 ft 4 in)	103 kg (227 lb)
F	16	(India)	Singh, Ajay Pratap	2.03 m (6 ft 8 in)	89 kg (196 lb)	30 – 9 July 1995
F	8	(India)	Singh, Amjyot	2.03 m (6 ft 8 in)	104 kg (229 lb)	34 – 27 January 1992
F	43	(India)	Singh, Arshdeep	1.98 m (6 ft 6 in)	103 kg (227 lb)

Head coach

- (India) P. J. Sebastian

Legend

- (C) Team captain
- Injured

- Roster
Updated: 3 March 2018
