= Ravi Bhardwaj =

Indian basketball player (born 1992)

Ravi Ethang Bhardwaj
Punjab Steelers
- Position: Forward
- League: UBA Pro Basketball League

Personal information
- Born: 31 October 1992 (age 34) Chandigarh, India
- Listed height: 6 ft 7 in (2.01 m)

Career information
- NBA draft: 2014: undrafted
- Playing career: 2015–present

Career history
- 2015–present: Punjab Steelers

Ravi Bhardwaj (born 31 October 1992) is an Indian professional basketball player. He currently plays for the Punjab Steelers of India's UBA Pro Basketball League.

== Career ==
Ravi started playing basketball at the age of 16. He was a member of India's national basketball team at the 2016 FIBA Asia Challenge in Tehran, Iran. There, he had his teams best field goal and free throw percentage. He also represented Indian National Basketball Team in Commonwealth Games held at Gold Coast, Australia from 4 to 15 April 2018.

In 2015, he was selected as the Most Valuable Player of UBA Pro League's first season.

Ravi Bhardwaj won many medals in inter-school, inter-university and inter-college meets. Ravi finished his MBA from Panjab University.
