= Mizoram Super League =

Indian basketball league

- Current season, competition or edition: 2025 Mizoram Super League
- Sport: Basketball
- Founded: 2015; 11 years ago
- First season: 2015
- No. of teams: 8
- Country: India
- Most recent champion: Zarkawt BCA (2024)
- Broadcaster: Zonet Cable TV
- Related competitions: First Division

Mizoram Super League is the most prestigious state-level basketball league that is held in Mizoram, India. It is organized by the Mizoram Basketball Association. Since its inception in 2015, the Mizoram Super League completed its tenth edition in 2025.

== Media coverage ==
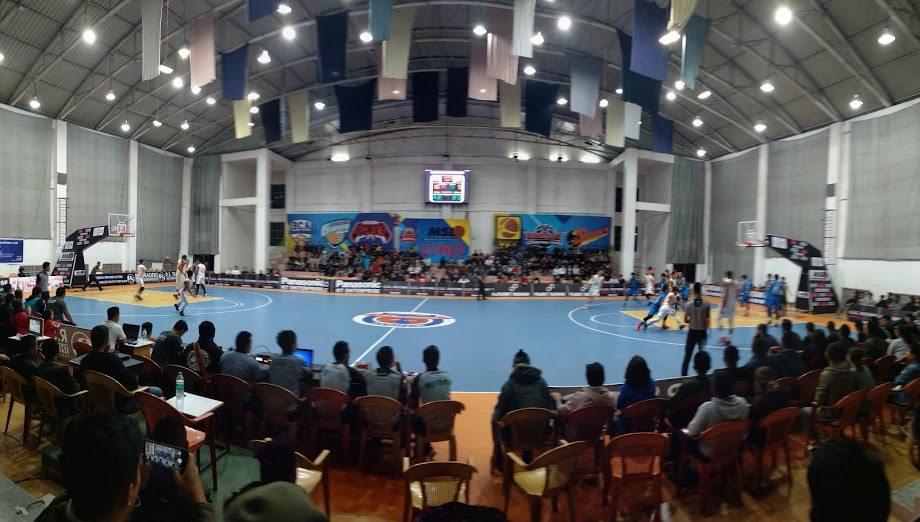
MSL game in Hawla Stadium

Media coverage with Zonet Cable TV was signed by the MBA president Chalrosanga and Zonet director Vanneihtluanga.

== Structure ==
Mizoram Super League most often has up to eight teams. At the end of the season the bottom team is relegated and the top team from First Division promoted into MSL. Number of its players gets invited to compete at the national level competitions, notably the Elite Pro Basketball League.

== Teams ==
- Champhai BC
- Bungkawn LB
- Khatla TBL
- Zemabawk BC
- Saron BC
- Electric BC
- Chanmari BC
- Zarkawt BCA
- Easter MST BC
- VL RRP-a BC

== Venues ==
The main venue where the matches are held is Hawla Indoor Stadium, together with R. Dengṭhuama Hall, Mualpui and VANIS, Champhai.

== See also ==
- UBA Pro Basketball League
- INBL
- Basketball Federation of India
- Basketball in India
