= Ganna Pind =

- Village
- Location in Punjab, India Ganna Pind (India)
- Coordinates: 31.0232105°N 75.7357053°E
- Country: India
- State: Punjab
- District: Jalandhar
- Tehsil: Phillaur

Government
  - Type: Panchayat raj
  - Body: Gram panchayat
- Elevation: 246 m (807 ft)

Population (2011)
  - Total: 4,465
- Sex ratio 2315/2150 ♂/♀

Languages
  - Official: Punjabi
- Time zone: UTC+5:30 (IST)
- PIN: 144410
- Telephone code: 01826
- ISO 3166 code: IN-PB
- Vehicle registration: PB 37
- Post office: Phillaur
- Website: jalandhar.nic.in

Ganna Pind is a village in the Phillaur tehsil of Jalandhar District of the Indian state of Punjab. It is located 5.8 kilometres (3.6 mi) from the head postal office in Phillaur, 48 kilometres (30 mi) from Jalandhar, and 115 kilometres (71 mi) from the state capital of Chandigarh. The village is administered by the Sarpanch, an elected representative.

== Demographics ==
According to the 2011 Census, Ganna Pind has a population of 4,465. The village has a literacy rate of 71.54%, higher than the average literacy rate of Punjab.

Most villagers belong to a Schedule Caste (SC), comprising 74.51% of the total.

== Transport ==
=== Rail ===
The nearest railway station is located 12 kilometres (7.5 mi) away in Bhattian and Phillaur Jn railway station is 11 kilometres (6.8 mi) away from the village.

=== Airport ===
The nearest airport is located 35 kilometres (22 mi) away in Ludhiana. The nearest international airport is located in Amritsar.
