= Basketball Federation of India =

Governing body of basketball in India

- Sport: Basketball
- Jurisdiction: India
- Abbreviation: BFI
- Founded: 1950; 76 years ago
- Affiliation: FIBA
- Regional affiliation: FIBA Asia
- Headquarters: New Delhi
- President: Aadhav Arjuna
- Secretary: Kulvinder Singh Gill
- Men's coach: Scott Flemming
- Women's coach: Baskar Sappaniambalam

Official website
- basketballfederationindia.org
- (India)

The Basketball Federation of India is the governing and controlling body of basketball in India. The national teams are known as the Indian Cagers. India Basketball League is the official 5x5 and 3x3 national league which is set to launch in 2026.

== History ==
BFI is involved in organizing training camps and national tournaments, and preparing Indian teams for both men's and women's international competitions in various age categories. First national level tournaments were organized in 1934. The India national basketball team became a member of FIBA in 1936. The governing body was formed in 1950. The current president of the BFI is Aadhav Arjuna. Poonam Mahajan was the first female president of BFI.

As of May 2024, the BFI had a contract with the Captains Professional Basketball League (CPBL) for the management of a professional basketball league. A dispute occurred when the BFI issued a new tender notice. As of June 2024, BFI was embroiled in a legal battle with the Indian National Basketball League (INBL).

== National teams ==
=== Senior ===
- India men's national basketball team
- India women's national basketball team
- India men's national 3x3 team
- India women's national 3x3 team

=== Youth ===
- India men's national under-18 basketball team
- India women's national under-18 basketball team
- India men's national under-16 basketball team
- India women's national under-16 basketball team
- India men's national under-18 3x3 team
- India women's national under-18 3x3 team

== Performance record ==
Age group	Men	Women
Senior (Men's) (Women's)	1987 South Asian Games; 1991 South Asian Games; 1995 South Asian Games; 2019 South Asian Games; 2010 South Asian Games	2019 South Asian Games; 2014 Lusofonia Games
U-18 (Men's) (Women's)	N/A	2018 Asian Championship (Div B)
U-16 (Men's) (Women's)	5th – 2022 Asian Championship	2018 Asian Championship (Div B)

=== 3x3 ===
Selection	Men	Women
Senior (Men's) (Women's)	QF – 2013 Asian Championship	2013 Asian Championship; 4th – 2017 Asian Championship

== Other tournaments ==
Level	Men	Women
Senior	InBL Pro U25 INBL 3x3 Federation Cup National Basketball Championship 3x3 National Basketball Championship U23 National Basketball Championship	National Basketball Championship 3x3 National Basketball Championship INBL 3x3
School and College	Indian School Basketball League Indian College Basketball League Khelo India University Games	

== Recognition ==
The Indian basketball players have also won several trophies for their country. There are 17 Indian basketball players who have been honored by the Government of India through the Arjuna Award. Two players have been bestowed with Dhyan Chand Awards for lifetime achievement.

== See also ==
- Sports in India
- Mizoram Super League
- Elite Pro Basketball League
- UBA Pro Basketball League
- 3x3 Pro Basketball League
