= Haryana Gold =

- Leagues: UBA Pro Basketball League
- Founded: 2015
- Location: Haryana, India

Haryana Gold was an Indian professional basketball team based in Haryana. The team last competed in the UBA Pro Basketball League as a member of the North Division. The team was established in 2015.

== Franchise history ==
The Haryana Gold became one of the UBA's most well-balanced teams in Season 1 on the strength of the league's most prolific backcourt in the first season. Vikas was the league's 6th leading scorer averaging 17.3 points and Birender was the 9th leading scorer as he averaged 16.2 PPG. Haryana finished with a 5–1 record in the regular season.

== Season-by-season record ==
UBA season	W	L	Finish	Playoffs
Season 1	5	1	1	
Season 2	0	7	4	
Season 3	2	2	2	
Season 4	1	5	4	

== Players ==
Note: Flags indicate national team eligibility at FIBA-sanctioned events. Players may hold other non-FIBA nationalities not displayed.

Haryana Gold roster
Players
Coaches

Pos.	No.	Nat.	Name	Ht.	Wt.	Age
	3	(India)	Bhasin, Akash
C	3	(India)	Hazra, Akashdeep	2.13 m (7 ft 0 in)		29 – 1 July 1996
G	19	(Australia)	Hyams, Eban	1.96 m (6 ft 5 in)	89 kg (196 lb)	44 – 21 March 1981
	8	(India)	Jaskaran
	25	(India)	Jayamanne, Shane
G	12	(United States)	Mattox, De'Sean	1.85 m (6 ft 1 in)	73 kg (161 lb)
G	2	(India)	Mishra, Prakash	1.83 m (6 ft 0 in)	70 kg (154 lb)	43 – 8 May 1982
	10	(India)	Singh, Birender
PF	30	(India)	Singh, Yadwinder	1.96 m (6 ft 5 in)	96 kg (212 lb)	38 – 30 December 1986
F	23	(India)	Shanmugam, Sridhar	1.90 m (6 ft 3 in)	86 kg (190 lb)	47 – 10 March 1978
	17	(India)	Sharma, Himanshu
	7	(India)	Shrivastava, Rajat

Head coach

- (India) Aaditya Vikram Singh

Assistant coach(es)

- (India) Puneet Kumar

Legend

- (C) Team captain
- Injured

- Roster
Updated: 4 March 2018

== See also ==
- Dominence of Haryana in sports
