= Indian National Basketball League =

Indian basketball league

InBL Pro
- Most recent season or competition: 2025 InBL Pro season
- Sport: Basketball
- Founded: 2021; 5 years ago
- First season: 2022–23
- CEO: Parveen Batish; Rupinder Brar; Dushyant Khanna; Abhishek Yash Tyagi
- Motto: Done. Hiding.
- No. of teams: 6
- Country: India
- Most recent champion: Gujarat Stallions (1st title) (2025)
- Broadcasters: Sony Sports Network; InBL Pro (YouTube)
- Website: inblpro.com

The Indian National Basketball League, aka INBL, is a professional basketball league in India.

== History ==
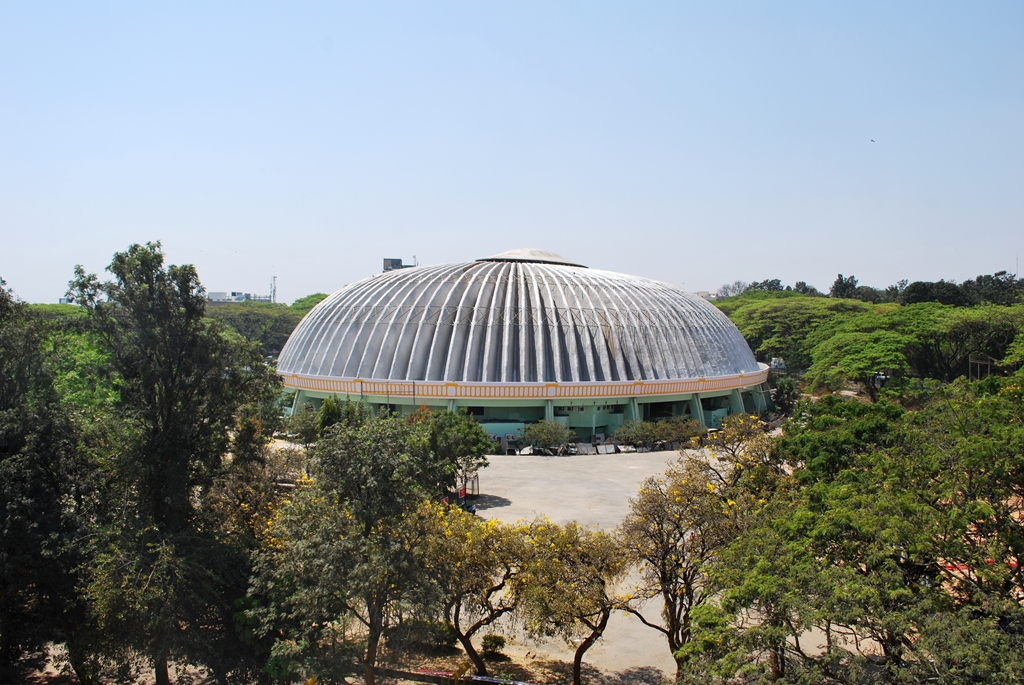
The Kanteerava Indoor Stadium hosted the Finals of the inaugural season in 2022–23.

The INBL was founded in 2021. The league was granted a five-year license by the Basketball Federation of India (BFI) to run the competition and also help promote the 3x3 version of the game. In its first season, the INBL allowed only Indian players to participate, with the aim being to provide players with additional competitive games to improve their standards towards the Elite Pro Basketball League and look to qualify for competitions such as the Olympics and World Cups.

The inaugural season was held between October 2022 and January 2023 across three different cities, namely Kochi, Pune and Delhi. The Chennai Heat won the first-ever INBL championship after defeating the Bengaluru Kings in the finals, that were hosted in the Kanteerava Indoor Stadium in Bengaluru.

Following the 5x5 tournament, the INBL also hosted an inaugural 3x3 tournament.

In May 2024, the league was relaunched as INBL Pro with an August start date and six city-based teams. The competition ultimately did not go ahead due to contract and legal disputes.

On 30 October 2024, the Indian Panthers, a team owned by the INBL Pro, entered the New Zealand National Basketball League (NZNBL) for the 2025 season. The team was set up in South Auckland. On 22 May 2025, the Panthers withdrew from the NZNBL mid season due to a variety of reasons.

In December 2024, the league announced that the InBL Pro U25 would commence in January 2025, with six teams comprising youth and college players under the age of 25.

== Current teams ==
Team	Representing city/state
Chennai Heat	Chennai
Punjab Warriors	Punjab
Delhi Dribblers	Delhi
Gujarat Stallions	Gujarat
Hyderabad Falcons	Hyderabad
Mumbai Titans	Mumbai

== Former teams ==
Team	Representing city/state
Bengaluru Kings	Bengaluru
Kochi Tigers	Kochi

== Results ==
=== List of finals ===
Season	Champions	Score	Runner-up	Ref.
2022–23	Chennai Heat	91–74	Bengaluru Kings	
2025	Gujarat Stallions	77–69	Punjab Warriors	

== Awards ==
=== Most valuable player ===
Season	Player	Team
2022–23	Baladhaneshwar Poiyamozhi	Chennai Heat
2025	Jack Purchase	Hyderabad Falcons

== See also ==
- Basketball Federation of India
- Elite Pro Basketball League
- UBA Pro Basketball League
- 3BL
- FIBA 3x3 World Tour
- Mizoram Super League
- National Basketball Championship
- West Asia Super League
- Basketball in India
- Sports in India
