= Surendra Kumar Kataria =

Indian basketball player

Career highlights
- Arjuna Award (1973)

Surendra Kumar Kataria is a former basketball player from India who represented India at many international competitions. He was awarded Arjuna award in 1973. He was born on 14 August in Bhilwara Rajasthan state and represented Indian Railways in national tournaments. It should also be mentioned here that he was a sharp-shooter in the true sense of the word, and Indian basketball has not seen such a shooter in all its history.

== Achievements ==
- Represented India in the 5th Asian Basketball Championship at Bangkok(Thailand) in 1969.
- Represented India in the 1st Youth Asian Basketball Championship held at Seoul(South Korea) in 1970.
- Represented India in the 10th Anniversary of Asian Basketball Championship at Manila(Philippines) in 1970 and won the Bronze Medal of ABC.
- Represented India in the 6th Asian Games held at Bangkok(Thailand) in 1970.
- Represented India in the 7th Asian Basketball Championship held at Manila(Philippines) in 1973.
- Selected for Asian team in 1973 during the 7th Asian Basketball Championship held at Manila.
- Declared SECOND TOP SCORER OF ASIA in the 7th Asian Basketball Championship held at Manila(Philippines) in 1973.
- Represented India in the 8th Asian Basketball Championship held at Bangkok(Thailand) in 1973.
- Represented India against USSR Team at Calcutta in 1975.
- Represented India as Captain in Quaid-E-Azam Mohd. Ali Zinha Memorial Festival at Lahore(Pakistan) in 1976.
- Represented Rajasthan State in National Basketball Championship from 1963 to 1968 in Junior section.
- Represented Rajasthan State in National Basketball Championship from 1969 to 1971 and won SILVER Medal.
- Captain of Indian Railways Basketball team in 1977–78.
- Represented as Coach of Indian Railways Basketball Team in the World Railway Games held at Romania in 1981 and won BRONZE Medal.
