= Bobby Sharma =

American investor and sports executive

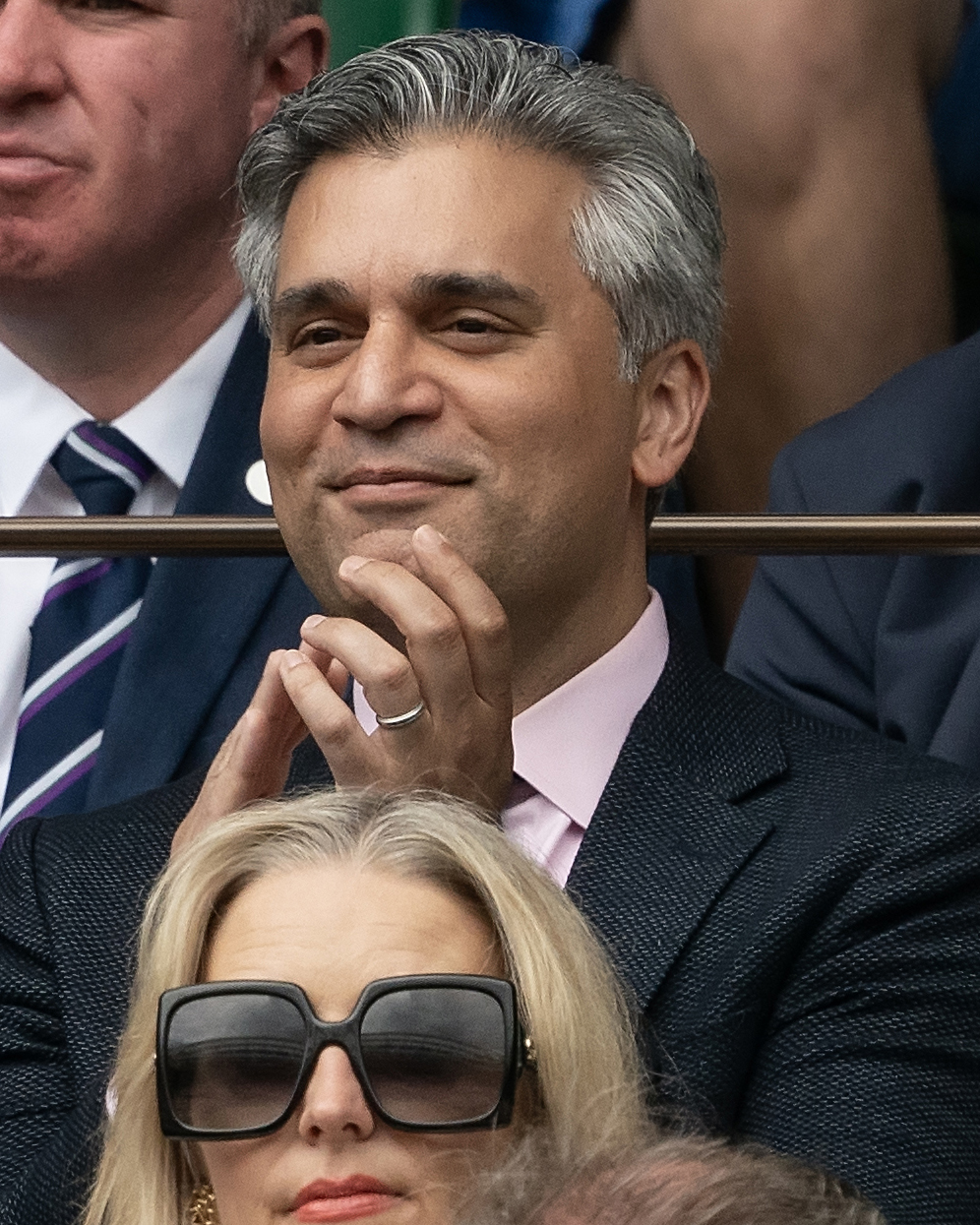
- Photo of Bobby Sharma
- Born: 1973 (age 52–53); Dayton, Ohio
- Education: Duke University; Duke University School of Law
- Occupations: Investor; Businessman; Attorney

Bobby Sharma (born in 1973) is an Indian-American investor. He is a former executive and attorney, including at the National Basketball Association where he helped build the NBA G-league, and is currently the founder and managing partner of private equity firm Bluestone Equity Partners.

== Early life and education ==
Sharma graduated from Duke University with a bachelor's degree and earned a Juris doctor degree from Duke Law School.

== Career ==
=== National Basketball Association (NBA) (2002-11) ===
Sharma worked as an executive and attorney for the National Basketball Association (NBA) from 2002 to 2011. While there, he helped lead the creation of the NBA’s first minor league, initially called the NBA Development League (or D-League), now known as the G-League. He worked with commissioners David Stern and Adam Silver throughout his tenure at the NBA and contributed while the G-League grew from 6 regional teams in the southeast, to 16 teams across the United States.

=== IMG & Investment (2011-23) ===
In 2011, Sharma joined an executive role with IMG Worldwide as senior vice president to global head of basketball and strategic initiatives. He was tasked with building professional sports leagues in international markets, starting with a basketball league in India after IMG acquired commercial rights to the sport in the country for 30 years; Sharma considered India as the "largest untapped basketball market in the world". At IMG Sharma worked alongside investor Ted Forstmann, building sports leagues in other international markets including Brazil, Nigeria and China, with sports such as basketball, soccer, and cricket.

=== Bluestone Equity Partners (2023-present) ===
In 2023, Sharma founded Bluestone Equity Partners, a private New York City-based equity firm focused on deals in the sports, media and entertainment industry. Sharma relied on his past experience and brought investors from Blackstone and Apollo Global.

Bluestone bought a $30 million stake in PMY Group, which designs and manages digital scoreboards, lighting, and acoustics at sports and entertainment venues. In 2024, the company invested in Volo Sports and RWS Global.
