= Yadwinder Singh =

Indian basketball player

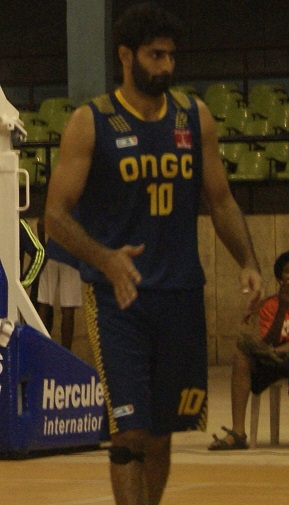
- Singh with ONGC in 2016.

Personal information
- Born: 30 December 1986 (age 39) Rasulpur Khurd, Jalandhar, Punjab, India
- Listed height: 6 ft 6 in (1.98 m)

Career information
- NBA draft: 2011: undrafted
- Playing career: 2011–present
- Position: Power forward

Career history
- 2011–2016: ONGC (India)
- 2017-2018: Haryana Gold (India)
Medals
Men's basketball
Representing India
Lusophony Games
Gold medal – first place	2014 Goa	Team

Yadwinder "Yadu" Singh (born 30 December 1986) is a former Indian professional basketball player. He last played for Haryana Gold of India's UBA Pro Basketball League. Singh is currently based in Garland, Texas, where he coaches players basketball.

== Professional career ==
In April of 2017, Yawinder Singh, along with four other Indian basketball players, were invited to Melbourne by the NBL, who took part in the combine on 17th and 18th of April at the Melbourne Sports and Aquatic Centre. Unfortunately, Singh went undrafted

Following his NBL tryouts, Singh decided to try out for the UBA Pro Basketball League, where Singh was selected by the Haryana Gold. He played for seasons 3 and 4 for the Gold before finishing his career with the team in 2018, when it became defunct.

On September 10, 2022, Singh decided to participate in the NBA G-League tryouts. Unfortunately, though, he didn't make the team.

== National team career ==
He debuted with the India's national basketball team in 2005 and played at the 2016 FIBA Asia Challenge in Tehran, Iran.

== Personal life ==
Singh is currently based in Garland, Texas, where he teaches kids how to play basketball as a coach.
