= Hyderabad Sky =

- Leagues: UBA Pro Basketball League
- Founded: 2015
- Location: Hyderabad, India
- Championships: None

Hyderabad Sky was an Indian professional basketball team located in Hyderabad, India. The team competed in India's UBA Pro Basketball League.

== Players ==
Note: Flags indicate national team eligibility at FIBA-sanctioned events. Players may hold other non-FIBA nationalities not displayed.

Hyderabad Skies roster
Players
Coaches

Pos.	No.	Nat.	Name	Ht.	Wt.	Age
F	21	(United States)	Mak, Boskalio	2.06 m (6 ft 9 in)
	8	(United States)	Tevin, Kelly
G	30	(India)	Joginder, Singh	1.75 m (5 ft 9 in)
	50	(India)	Manu, Thomas
	2	(India)	Mahesh, Padmanabhan
G	19	(India)	Sahil, Sahil	1.84 m (6 ft 0 in)
G	23	(India)	Mahipal, Singh	1.81 m (5 ft 11 in)
G	15	(India)	Gnanasekaran, Sivabalan
	25	(India)	Jatana
	27	(India)	Parveen, Kumar
	33	(India)	Dinesh, Mishra
	34	(India)	Aagosh, Sharma

Head coach

Legend

- (C) Team captain
- Injured

- Roster
Updated: 4 March 2018
