= Pune Peshwas =

- Leagues: UBA Pro Basketball League
- Founded: 2015
- Arena: Deccan Gymkhana Ground; Shree Shiv Chhatrapati Sports Complex
- Location: Pune, India
Home	Away

Pune Peshwas was an Indian professional basketball team located in Pune, India. The team last competed in India's UBA Pro Basketball League.

== Players ==
Note: Flags indicate national team eligibility at FIBA-sanctioned events. Players may hold other non-FIBA nationalities not displayed.

Pune Peshwas roster
Players
Coaches

Pos.	No.	Nat.	Name
PG	3	(United States)	Newton Pierre
	9	(India)	Ajinkya Mane
F/C	11	(India)	Gaurav Ohlan
F/C	12	(India)	Amritpal Singh
PG	15	(India)	Siddhant Shinde
	23	(India)	Ajinkya Mehta
	25	(India)	Narender Grewal
SG	30	(India)	Pranav Wagle
SF	32	(India)	Arshpreet Bhullar
	34	(India)	Pradeep Chauhan
	44	(India)	Hemant

Head coach

(India) R Kumar

Assistant coach(es)

(India) S Venkatesh

Legend

- (C) Team captain
- Injured

- Roster
Updated: 14 July 2017

== Notable players ==
To appear in this section a player must have either:

- Set a club record or won an individual award as a professional player
- Played at least one official international match for his senior national team

- (India) Amritpal Singh
- (India) Arshpreet Bhullar
- (India) Shahab Jamal
- (India) Siddhant Shinde
- (India) / (Spain) Pranav Wagle
- (India) Karna Mehta

== Miscellaneous ==
Notable fans of the team include Himesh Reshammiya who performed at a halftime show in 2016, and actor Neil Nitin Mukesh.
