= India national basketball team =

India national basketball team may refer to:

- India men's national basketball team
- India women's national basketball team
- India men's national 3x3 team
- India women's national 3x3 team
