= Punjab Steelers =

Indian basketball team

- League: UBA Pro Basketball League
- Founded: 2015
- Location: Punjab, India
- Head coach: Gurkripal Singh

Punjab Steelers was an Indian professional basketball team located in Punjab, India. The team last competed in India's UBA Pro Basketball League.

The team's head coach was Gurkripal Singh.

== Players ==
Punjab Steelers season 4 roster

#	Name	Weight(Kg)	Height
1	Garry Gill	88	6 ft 8 in
4	Irakoze Bryan	76	6 ft 0 in
8	Navjot Baria	75	6 ft 1 in
9	Sagar Joshi	72	5 ft 11 in
12	Taj Sandhu	97	6 ft 2 in
14	Ravi Bharadwaj	107	6 ft 9 in
15	Akilan Pari	77	5 ft 8 in
20	Akhilesh Kumar	78	5 ft 10 in
24	Rajveer Singh	86	6 ft 1 in
33	Dermaine Crockrell	74	6 ft 2 in
35	Dharani Kumar A.	64	5 ft 9 in
51	Kaushal Kumar	125	6 ft 5 in
