= UBA Pro Basketball League =

- Sport: Basketball
- Founded: 2015
- First season: 2015
- Folded: 2017
- Replaced by: Elite Pro Basketball League
- CEO: Tommy Fisher
- No. of teams: 8
- Country: India
- Last champion: Mumbai Challengers (1st title) (2017)
- Most titles: Chennai Slam (2 titles)
- Broadcasters: India: TEN Action; TEN Sports

The United Basketball Alliance (UBA) was the first men’s professional basketball league in India, comprising eight teams. The UBA was headquartered in Pune and had a city team, Pune Peshwas. The first UBA match was played on 17 July 2015 at Gachibowli Indoor Stadium, Hyderabad between Bengaluru Beast and Pune Peshwas. The match was won by Pune Peshwas as they pulled out an 88-81 win. This marked the first time a professional basketball league tipped off in India.

The league played out between 2015 and 2017. However, the Basketball Federation of India did not invite UBA players for national and international tournaments. UBA was replaced by Elite Pro Basketball League in 2022.

== Teams ==
The UBA comprised eight teams which competed across two divisions: Mumbai Challengers, Delhi Capitals, Punjab Steelers and Haryana Gold in the North Division, while Chennai Slam, Pune Peshwas, Bengaluru Beast and Hyderabad Sky made the South Division.

=== North Division ===
Teams	State/City
Haryana Gold	Haryana
Punjab Steelers	Punjab
Delhi Capitals	Delhi
Mumbai Challengers	Mumbai, Maharashtra

=== South Division ===
Teams	State/City
Pune Peshwas	Pune, Maharashtra
Bengaluru Beast	Bengaluru, Karnataka
Chennai Slam	Chennai, Tamil Nadu
Hyderabad Sky	Hyderabad, Telangana

== Seasons ==
=== Season 1 ===
UBA season 1 was held during 17–30 July 2015 at Gachibowli Indoor Stadium, Hyderabad, Telangana. Chennai Slam won the UBA Championship in Season 1. Ravi Bhardwaj (Punjab Steelers) was the MVP of UBA season 1, averaging 20.3 points per game.

Each team played six games in the regular season. After the regular season, the team leading their division faced the runners-up from the other division for the semi-finals.

==== North Division ====
Team Name	Win	Loss
Haryana Gold	5	1
Punjab Steelers	4	2
Delhi Capitals	3	3
Mumbai Challengers	0	6

==== South Division ====
Team Name	Win	Loss
Chennai Slam	4	2
Pune Peshwas*	3	3
Bengaluru Beast	3	3
Hyderabad Sky	2	4

(* won tiebreak for 2nd place)

=== Season 2 ===
UBA Season 2 was held in two legs. The first leg was during 18–28 February 2016 in Balewadi Stadium, Pune, Maharashtra. The second leg was held from 23 March to 3 April 2016 at Gachibowli Indoor Stadium, Hyderabad, Telangana. Delhi Capitas bested Chennai Slam in a 3-game finals series to claim the title of season 2. Vinay Kaushik (Delhi Capitals) was awarded MVP honors, averaging 18.7 points per game.

Each team played seven games in the regular season. Five games were played in the first leg in Pune. Hyderabad leg saw the teams play two regular season games in addition to the postseason. Season 2 postseason included a play-in game for each division to determine semi-finalists between the 2nd and 3rd place team. The semifinals and finals were best-of-three series.

==== North Division ====
Team Name	Win	Loss
Delhi Capitals	6	1
Mumbai Challengers	4	3
Punjab Steelers	3	4
Haryana Gold	0	7

==== South Division ====
Team Name	Win	Loss
Chennai Slam*	4	3
Bengaluru Beast**	4	3
Pune Peshwas	4*	3
Hyderabad Sky	3	4

(* won tiebreak for 1st place)
(** won tiebreak for 2nd place)

=== Season 3 ===
UBA Season 3 was held in Balewadi Stadium, Pune, Maharashtra from 15 to 31 July 2016. The season 3 championship was won by Chennai Slam after they defeated Punjab Steelers in three games. Narender Grewal (Pune Peshwas) won MVP honors, averaging 31.8 points per game. Each team played 4 games in the regular season, including cross-division matches. The post-season saw a play-in game for each division and best of three semifinals and finals series.

==== North Division ====
Team Name	Win	Loss
Punjab Steelers	3	1
Haryana Gold*	2	2
Mumbai Challengers	2	2
Delhi Capitals	1	3

(* won tiebreak for 2nd place)

==== South Division ====
Team Name	Win	Loss
Chennai Slam**	3	1
Pune Peshwas	3	1
Hyderabad Sky***	1*	3
Bengaluru Beast	1	3

(**- won tiebreak for 1st place)
(***- won tiebreak for 3rd place)

=== Season 4 ===
UBA season 4 was held in two legs, with the first leg being held at Sathyabama University, Chennai, Tamil Nadu, and the second leg at Dr Shyama Prasad Mukherjee Indoor Stadium, Goa. Season 4 championship was won by Mumbai Challengers as they bested Bengaluru Beast in two games in the best of three finals series. Vishesh Bhriguvanshi (Bengaluru Beast) won Indian MVP honors, averaging 28.3 points per game and Dermaine Crockrell (Punjab Steelers) won International MVP honors, with a league-leading 41.2 points per game. The postseason saw a play-in game for each division and a best of three semifinals and finals series. The teams played six games each in the regular season within their division. The postseason saw a play-in game for each division and best of three semifinal and final series.

==== North Division ====
Team Name	Win	Loss
Mumbai Challengers	5	1
Delhi Capitals	4	2
Punjab Steelers	2	4
Haryana Gold	1	5

==== South Division ====
Team Name	Win	Loss
Pune Peshwas	4	2
Bengaluru Beast*	3	3
Hyderabad Sky	3	3
Chennai Slam	2	4

(* won tiebreak for 2nd place)

== Playoffs ==
=== Season 1 ===
UBA season 1 semifinals involved Pune Peshwas, Haryana Gold, Chennai Slam and Punjab Steelers. Haryana Gold faced Pune Peshwas and Chennai Slam faced Punjab Steelers for the other semifinals. Pune defeated Haryana (81-80) and Chennai overcame Punjab (92-77). In the one-game final, Chennai defeated Pune (81-49). This marked the first and only time that two teams from the same division faced each other in the finals.

=== Season 2 ===
UBA season 2 playoffs saw the division leaders Delhi Capitals (North) and Chennai Slam (South) book their places in the semifinals series. In the North Division, Mumbai Challengers eliminated Punjab Steelers (78-76) in a knockout play-in game for a semifinal berth against Delhi Capitals. South Division play-in game saw Pune Peshwas edge out Bengaluru Beast (79-73) for a semifinal matchup with Chennai Slam.

The semifinal and final series were best of three contests each. North Division semifinals saw Delhi Capitals drop their first game (75-69) to Mumbai Challengers but they rallied and won the next two matches (72-61 and 78-69) to go through to the finals series. In the South Division, Chennai Slam won the opening match vs Pune Peshwas (88-72), dropped the next one (73-71) before decisively pulling away with a win in the third match (97-76) to set up a date with Delhi Capitals in the finals series.

The final series saw Chennai Slam take a 1-0 lead over Delhi Capitals with a 77-62 win. Delhi Capitals once again rallied and won the next two games (77-67 and 92-65) to win their first UBA Championship.

=== Season 3 ===
UBA season 3 saw Punjab Steelers (North) and Chennai Slam (South) finish at the top of the table in the regular season to book semifinal berths. The other two semifinal berths went to Haryana Gold and Pune Peshwas. Haryana Gold won the North Division play-in game against Mumbai Challengers (97-91), while Pune Peshwas defeated Hyderabad Sky (101-94) in the South Division play-in game to book semifinal berths.

The semifinal and final were played in a best of three formats. In the North Division semifinals series, Punjab Steelers mounted a 14-point comeback in the first game and defeated Haryana Gold (98-91). They won their next game (106-97) to make it to the finals series. In the South Division semifinals series, Chennai Slam defeated Pune Peshwas in two games (98-91 and 97-79) to face Punjab Steelers in finals. The finals series went the distance to three games, with Chennai Slam winning the first match (101-83) after overcoming an 11-point deficit. Punjab Steelers took the second game (83-81), but Chennai Slam took the crown with a (69-59) win in the third and decisive game to win their second UBA championship.

=== Season 4 ===
UBA season 4 had Mumbai Challengers (North) and Pune Peshwas (South) finish at the top of the table in the regular season, earning them semifinal berths. Punjab Steelers and Bengaluru Beast won the other two semifinal berths. Punjab Steelers toppled Delhi Capitals (102-92) in the North Division play-in game, and Bengaluru Beast defeated Hyderabad Sky (116-113) in the South Division play-in game to set up the semifinal showdown.

In the semifinal series, Mumbai Challengers defeated Punjab Steelers in two games (128-114 and 120-104), while Bengaluru Beast put Pune Peshwas away in two games as well (138-133 and 113-107). Mumbai Challengers needed just two games to come out on top of Bengaluru Beast (winning 110-95 and 118-105) as they won their first UBA Championship.

== List of champions ==
Year	Season	Champions	Result	Runners-up	Ref.
2015	1	Chennai Slam	1–0	Pune Peshwas	
2016	2	Delhi Capitals	2–1	Chennai Slam	
2016	3	Chennai Slam	2–1	Punjab Steelers	
2017	4	Mumbai Challengers	2–0	Bengaluru Beast	

== UBA U.S. pro training camps ==
UBA has conducted three UBA U.S. pro training camps thus far. The camps were held in Phoenix, Arizona. The camps were designed to expose the best players in India to world class training, facilities and competition. They underwent intense training sessions including four hours of basketball training and two hours of strength and conditioning training every day. The players also got an opportunity to engage in team building activities and fun excursions. The goal of the cap was to inculcate habits in the players which they carry back with them and imbibe in their daily routines to elevate their game higher.

Speaking about the UBA U.S. pro training camp, UBA CEO Tommy Fisher had said: "I think the most important thing is pushing the boys of India to a higher level of competition than they’ve probably been able to achieve. The one thing that we have that I see is there’s heart and there’s effort and these players of India want to become better. They listen when the coaches talk to them. They want to become better basketball players. And so, we’re starting at something that’s pure that hopefully, we can make great."

The exercise drills have been specially designed by Keith Wilson, head performance coach at Pro Advantage Systems in Phoenix. He’s designed the exercises with the express intent to improve the attributes of the players and condition them for improved performance on the basketball court. He had said: "I like to teach as I train so I want to educate them. Everything I do with someone I have a reason for it. So, every athlete I work with, I don’t just arbitrarily throw something in their program. I can explain everything and that’s what I’ve tried to do during this training process so they can understand what I’m trying to accomplish with them."

The first UBA U.S. pro training camp was held in November 2015. The following players were selected to participate in the 1st camp: Ajinkya Mehta (Pune Peshwas), Gurvinder Singh Gill (Punjab Steelers), Jagdeep Bains (Mumbai Challengers), Kaif Zia (Bengaluru Beast), Ram Kumar (Chennai Slam), Ravi Bhardwaj (Punjab Steelers), Taj Sandhu (Punjab Steelers), Vijay (Pune Peshwas) and Yudhvir (Delhi Capitals)

The second UBA U.S. pro training camp was held in December 2016. It was attended by Akashdeep Hazra (Haryana Gold), Dildar Brar (Mumbai Challengers), Gurvinder Singh "Garry" Gill (Punjab Steelers), Gaurav Ohlan (Pune Peshwas), Himanshu Sharma (Haryana Gold), Jairam Jat (Chennai Slam), Mahesh Padmanabhan (Hyderabad Sky), Ajinkya Mane (Pune Peshwas), Manu Thomas (Hyderabad Sky), Nikhil (Mumbai Challengers), Prudhvi Reddy (Mumbai Challengers), Siddhant Shinde (Pune Peshwas), Taj Sandhu (Punjab Steelers) and Vikas Mor (Haryana Gold). The players also had an opportunity to attend an NBA game between Phoenix Suns and New York Knicks.

The 3rd UBA U.S. pro training camp was held in December 2017. It was attended by Satnam Singh (1st Indian drafted in NBA), Garry Gill (Punjab Steelers), Jagdeep Bains (Mumbai Challengers), Khushmeet Singh Atwal (Bengaluru Beast), Loveneet Singh Atwal (Bengaluru Beast), Ajinkya Mane (Pune Peshwas), Narender Grewal (Pune Peshwas), Nikhil Dahiya (Mumbai Challengers), Palpreet Brar (Bengaluru Beast), Prudhvi Reddy (Mumbai Challengers), Siddhant Shinde (Pune Peshwas) and Yadwinder Singh (Haryana Gold). In addition to these 12 players, the camp was attended by Indian origin players from abroad along with players from USA and Canada.

== See also ==
- INBL
- 3BL
- Sports in India
- FIBA Asia Champions Cup
- National Basketball Championship
