= Basketball at the 2014 Lusofonia Games – Men's team rosters =

Basketball at the 2014 Lusophony Games Men's team rosters

This article displays the rosters for the participating teams at the 2014 Lusophony Games.

== Angola ==
Angola national basketball team – 2014 Lusophony Games – Silver Medal roster
Players
Coaches

Pos.	No.	Name	Age – Date of birth	Height	Club	Ctr.
	4	Edson Ndoniema	22 – 2 November 1991		Primeiro de Agosto	(Angola)
	5	Mutau Fonseca	24 – 11 September 1989		Primeiro de Agosto	(Angola)
	6	Hermenegildo Santos	23 – 16 August 1990		Primeiro de Agosto	(Angola)
	7	Islando Manuel	22 – 1 July 1991		Primeiro de Agosto	(Angola)
	8	António Monteiro	24 – 2 April 1989		Recreativo Libolo	(Angola)
	9	Bráulio Morais	23 – 17 December 1990		Recreativo Libolo	(Angola)
	10	Yuri Suingue	27 – 5 January 1987		ASA	(Angola)
	11	Zola Paulo	26 – 20 January 1988		ASA	(Angola)
	12	André Miguel	25 – 1 January 1989		Interclube	(Angola)
	13	Edson Hilukilwa	23 – 1 December 1990
	14	Edmir Lucas	20 – 15 July 1993		Primeiro de Agosto	(Angola)
	15	António Deográcio	24 – 27 November 1989		Sporting Benguela	(Angola)
	17	Jone Pedro	23 – 28 May 1990		ASA	(Angola)

Head coach

- (Angola) Manuel Sousa "Necas"

Assistant coach

Legend

- (C) Team captain
- Club field describes current club

== Cape Verde ==
Cape Verde national basketball team – 2014 Lusophony Games – 4th place roster
Players
Coaches

Pos.	No.	Name	Age – Date of birth	Height	Club	Ctr.
	4	Daniel Gonçalves	25 – 27 July 1988	1.90 m (6 ft 3 in)
	5	Fidel Mendonça	29 – 7 July 1984	1.90 m (6 ft 3 in)
	6	Erickson Duarte	26 – 2 January 1988	1.89 m (6 ft 2 in)
	7	Elizandro Rodrigues	25 – 28 November 1988	1.78 m (5 ft 10 in)
	8	Hernani Delgado	22 – 10 May 1991	1.89 m (6 ft 2 in)
	9	Nilton Gomes	26 – 22 March 1987	2.05 m (6 ft 9 in)
	10	Kenneti Mendes	23 – 17 August 1990	2.03 m (6 ft 8 in)
	11	Edmilson Abreu	29 – 26 September 1984	1.85 m (6 ft 1 in)
	12	Patrick Abreu	22 – 20 March 1991	1.89 m (6 ft 2 in)
	13	Evandro Delgado	19 – 22 October 1994	1.94 m (6 ft 4 in)
	14	Jason Correia	20 – 8 December 1993	1.94 m (6 ft 4 in)
	15	Paulo Dias (basketball)	27 – 27 November 1986	1.99 m (6 ft 6 in)

Head coach

Assistant coach

Legend

- (C) Team captain
- Club field describes current club

== Guinea-Bissau ==
Guinea Bissau national basketball team – 2014 Lusophony Games – 6th place roster
Players
Coaches

Pos.	No.	Name	Age – Date of birth	Height	Club	Ctr.
	4	Abdulai Balde	28 – 28 October 1985
	5	Josimar Vieira	23 – 4 June 1990
	6	Josimar Cardoso	26 – 19 March 1987
	8	Danilson Vieira	28 – 30 August 1985
	9	Jailson Lopes	27 – 5 June 1986
	10	Carlos Gomes	19 – 24 September 1994
	11	Ouncubor Nascimento	22 – 25 February 1991
	12	Mohamed Camara	30 – 10 July 1983
	13	Marito Almeida	18 – 10 September 1995
	15	Franklin Furtado	26 – 21 October 1987
	26	Anastácio Teixeira	31 – 20 September 1982
	44	Luís Pinhel	25 – 19 June 1988

Head coach

Assistant coach

Legend

- (C) Team captain
- Club field describes current club

== India ==
India national basketball team – 2014 Lusophony Games – Gold Medal roster
Players
Coaches

Pos.	No.	Name	Age – Date of birth	Height	Club	Ctr.
PG	4	Sambhaji Kadam	33 – 15 March 1980	1.75 m (5 ft 9 in)
G	5	Narender Grewal	25 – 25 June 1988	1.85 m (6 ft 1 in)
	6	Daley Fernandes	25 – 9 April 1988
	7	Lambert Fernandes	33 – 7 June 1980
F	8	Pratham Singh	23 – 10 January 1991	1.82 m (6 ft 0 in)
F	9	Vishesh Bhriguvanshi	22 – 13 September 1991	1.92 m (6 ft 4 in)
C	10	Amritpal Singh	23 – 5 January 1991	2.08 m (6 ft 10 in)
PG	11	Joginder Singh	25 – 27 May 1988	1.75 m (5 ft 9 in)
	12	Palpreet Singh Brar	19 – 1 March 1994
F	13	Amjyot Singh	22 – 27 January 1992	2.03 m (6 ft 8 in)
F	14	Yadwinder Singh	27 – 30 December 1986	1.96 m (6 ft 5 in)
C	15	Rikin Pethani	23 – 2 December 1990	2.03 m (6 ft 8 in)

Head coach

- Scott Flemming

Assistant coach

Legend

- (C) Team captain
- Club field describes current club

== Macau ==
Macau national basketball team – 2014 Lusophony Games – 5th place roster
Players
Coaches

Pos.	No.	Name	Age – Date of birth	Height	Club	Ctr.
	4	Tagura Wheymz	21 – 20 March 1992	1.72 m (5 ft 8 in)
	5	Sou Chi Hou	20 – 8 June 1993	1.76 m (5 ft 9 in)
	6	Lo Hip Meng	20 – 28 August 1993	1.85 m (6 ft 1 in)
	7	Leong Chi Seng	29 – 4 January 1985	1.76 m (5 ft 9 in)
	8	Alves Dos Santos	37 – 6 May 1976	1.92 m (6 ft 4 in)
	9	Iong Ka Kin	26 – 31 March 1987	1.70 m (5 ft 7 in)
	10	Un Kam Chi	20 – 24 March 1993	2.00 m (6 ft 7 in)
	12	Kan Wai Hang	25 – 1 October 1988	1.80 m (5 ft 11 in)
	13	Iong Ngai San	17 – 9 February 1996	1.79 m (5 ft 10 in)
	15	Lai Ka Tong	18 – 25 October 1995	1.78 m (5 ft 10 in)
	29	Cheong Tong Fai	31 – 2 January 1983	1.90 m (6 ft 3 in)
	30	Chang Kuok Wai	27 – 12 December 1986	1.84 m (6 ft 0 in)

Head coach

Assistant coach

Legend

- (C) Team captain
- Club field describes current club

== Mozambique ==
Mozambique national basketball team – 2014 Lusophony Games – Bronze Medal roster
Players
Coaches

Pos.	No.	Name	Age – Date of birth	Height	Club	Ctr.
	4	Nelson Jossias	24 – 21 August 1989
PG	5	Samora Mucavel	27 – 9 September 1986	1.83 m (6 ft 0 in)
	6	Dércio Mula	20 – 4 August 1993
C	7	Custódio Muchate	31 – 6 May 1982	1.98 m (6 ft 6 in)
SG	8	Ermelindo Novela	22 – 20 February 1991	1.84 m (6 ft 0 in)
	9	Hugo Martins	18 – 12 March 1995
	10	Pio Matos	23 – 29 November 1990	1.85 m (6 ft 1 in)
	11	Luís Barros	27 – 17 March 1986
	12	Sika Koko	21 – 31 January 1992
C	13	Armando Baptista	28 – 2 June 1985	2.00 m (6 ft 7 in)
	14	Ismael Nurmamad	22 – 3 December 1991
SG	15	Augusto Matos	23 – 29 November 1990	1.85 m (6 ft 1 in)

Head coach

- (Mozambique) Horácio Martins

Assistant coach

Legend

- (C) Team captain
- Club field describes current club
