= India men's national basketball team =

India
- FIBA ranking: 76 ▼1 (1 September 2026)
- Joined FIBA: 1936
- FIBA zone: FIBA Asia
- National federation: Basketball Federation of India
- Coach: R. L. Prasad Guntupalli

Olympic Games
- Appearances: 1

Asia Cup
- Appearances: 27

South Asian Championship
- Appearances: 6
- Medals: (2002, 2014, 2015, 2016, 2017, 2021)
Home	Away
Medal record
Event	1st	2nd	3rd
SABA Championship	6	0	0
Lusofonia Games	1	0	0
South Asian Games	4	1	0
Total	11	1	0
Lusofonia Games
Gold medal – first place	2014 Goa	
South Asian Games
Gold medal – first place	1987 Calcutta	
Gold medal – first place	1991 Colombo	
Gold medal – first place	1995 Madras	
Gold medal – first place	2019 Kathmandu	
Silver medal – second place	2010 Dhaka	
South Asian Championship
Gold medal – first place	2002 India	
Gold medal – first place	2014 Nepal	
Gold medal – first place	2015 India	
Gold medal – first place	2016 India	
Gold medal – first place	2017 Maldives	
Gold medal – first place	2021 Bangladesh	

The India men's national basketball team represents India in international basketball. It is governed by the Basketball Federation of India.

A 1936 founding member of FIBA Asia, India has one of Asia's longest basketball traditions. Throughout its history, Team India qualified for the FIBA Asia Championship 26 times and is placed in the top five in appearances in this tournament. Further, India's basketball team won four gold medals and one silver medal at the South Asian Games and is the most successful team in the South Asian region. India have also won the SABA Championship six times. Team India celebrated its victory at the 2014 Lusofonia Games after they finished the tournament with a 4–0 record as they beat 11–time African Champions Angola in the final.

Its most famous moment came at the 2014 FIBA Asia Cup with the win against home favorites and most successful Asian team China by seven points. This win has been labelled as the biggest basketball win in the nation's history.

== History ==
India appeared at the international stage for the first time ever at the Asian Games in the 1951 edition and the Asian Championships at the 1965 Asian Basketball Championship where it started out as moderately competitive. India became a regular at the event and had their most successful tournament in 1975 when the team even reached the final four.

Plagued by a lack of popularity and support for basketball at home, at times, India faded into oblivion and only had a handful of successful performances. Its most noteworthy tournament appearance was at the 1980 Summer Olympics when the team got its chance to represent Asia due to the cancellations of some teams who took part in the American-led boycott of the 1980 Summer Olympics. A few of the world's top basketball powers at that time (such as the United States and Canada) withdrew from the tournament. India finished 12th out of 12 in the Olympics after getting knocked out in the preliminary round by losing all three of their matches and then losing all five of their matches in the Classification round.

While the results did not go India's way one game in particular caught the attention of everyone. India played against the Australian Team, one of the world's top basketball teams. India, which was made up solely of voluntary basketball players competed against the elite team of Australia for almost the whole game until it finally ceded to the Boomers 75–93 after leading at halftime 41–37.

Many Indian players also made headlines while in the Soviet Union as well. Ajmer Singh gained worldwide attention as he was amongst the top 10 shooters there and became the 10th best pivot player in the tournament there. The late 90s saw the emergence of Sozhasingarayer Robinson, the first Indian basketball player who gained considerable international attention. Robinson led India to a surprising victory over South Korea, one of Asia's top teams. In 2005, however, Robinson complained that the structure and support for basketball in India was still mediocre and government officials did not do enough to support the sport. As a protest, he retired from the national team.

At the 2011 FIBA Asia Championship India was coached by former Sacramento Kings head coach Kenny Natt. In 2012, former NBA D-League and U.S. college coach, Scott Flemming, took over the team. Under his supervision, the team won the South Asia Championship in 2014. India had two wins and finished 3 places higher (11th) in the 2013 FIBA Asia Championship than in 2011. In 2014, the Young Cagers (as team India is often nicknamed) won the Lusofonia games with wins over Guinea-Bissau, Cape Verde, and Angola in the gold medal game. This was Team India's first title ever in a non-Asian competition. In the 2014 FIBA Asia Cup India pulled off the biggest win in their 80-year history by defeating China on their home court 65–58. The establishment of a professional league was a major step in continuing this recent success. India continued their dominance in South Asia by winning further South Asian Championships in 2015, 2016, 2017 and 2021.

== Gallery ==
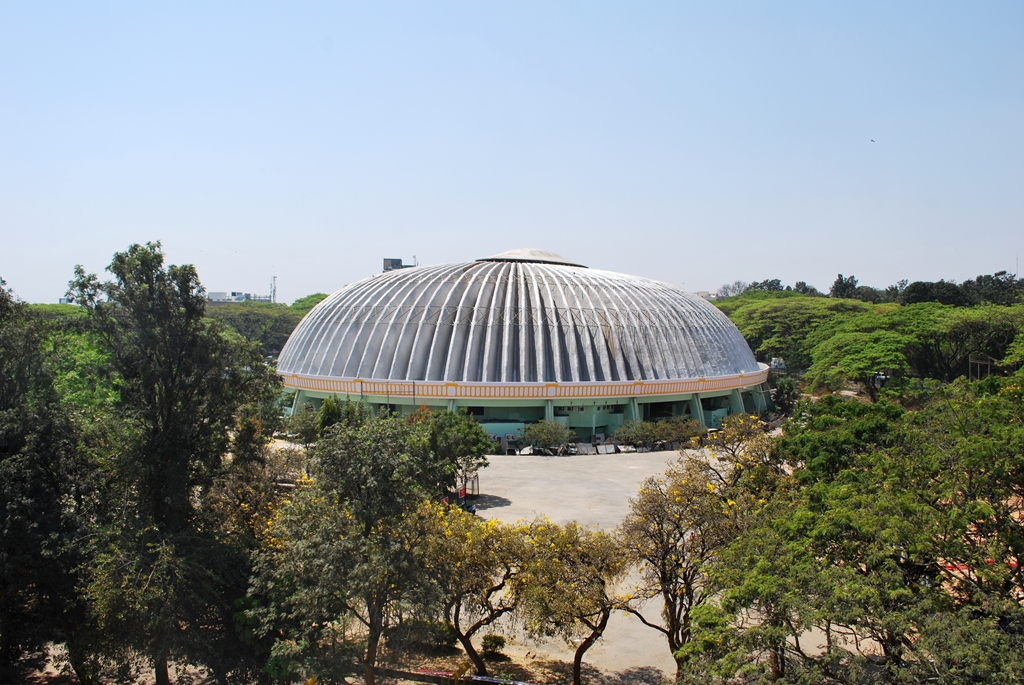
The Kanteerava Indoor Stadium hosted the SABA Championship in 2015 and 2016. India won the gold medal on both occasions. Team India has frequently used the facility for training sessions

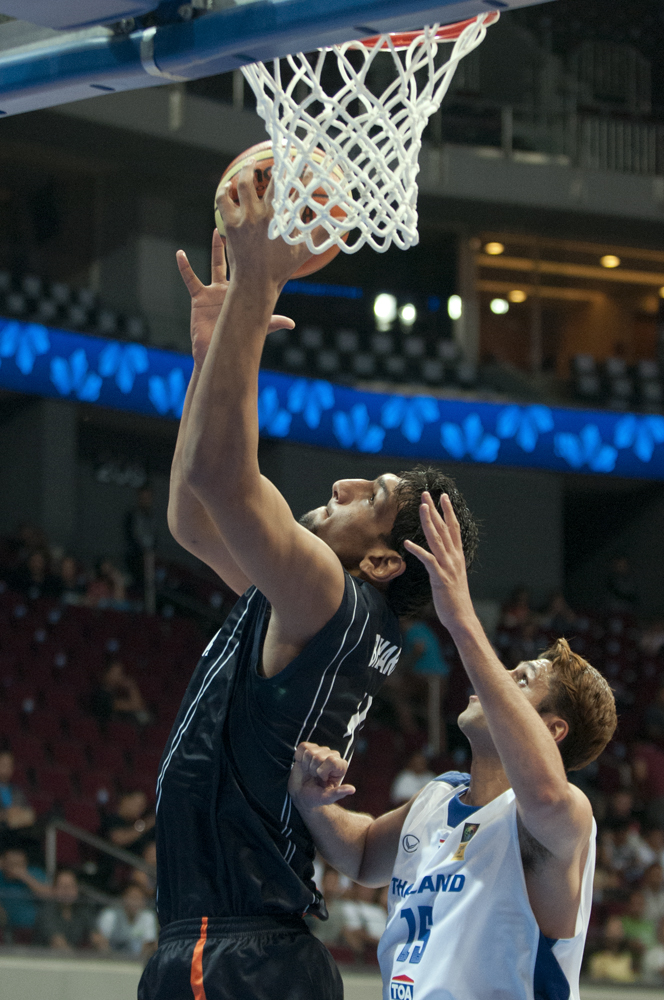
Satnam Singh Bhamara (left) with the Indian national team in 2013

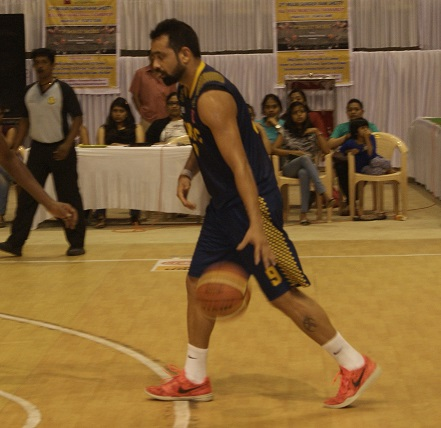
Vishesh Bhriguvanshi

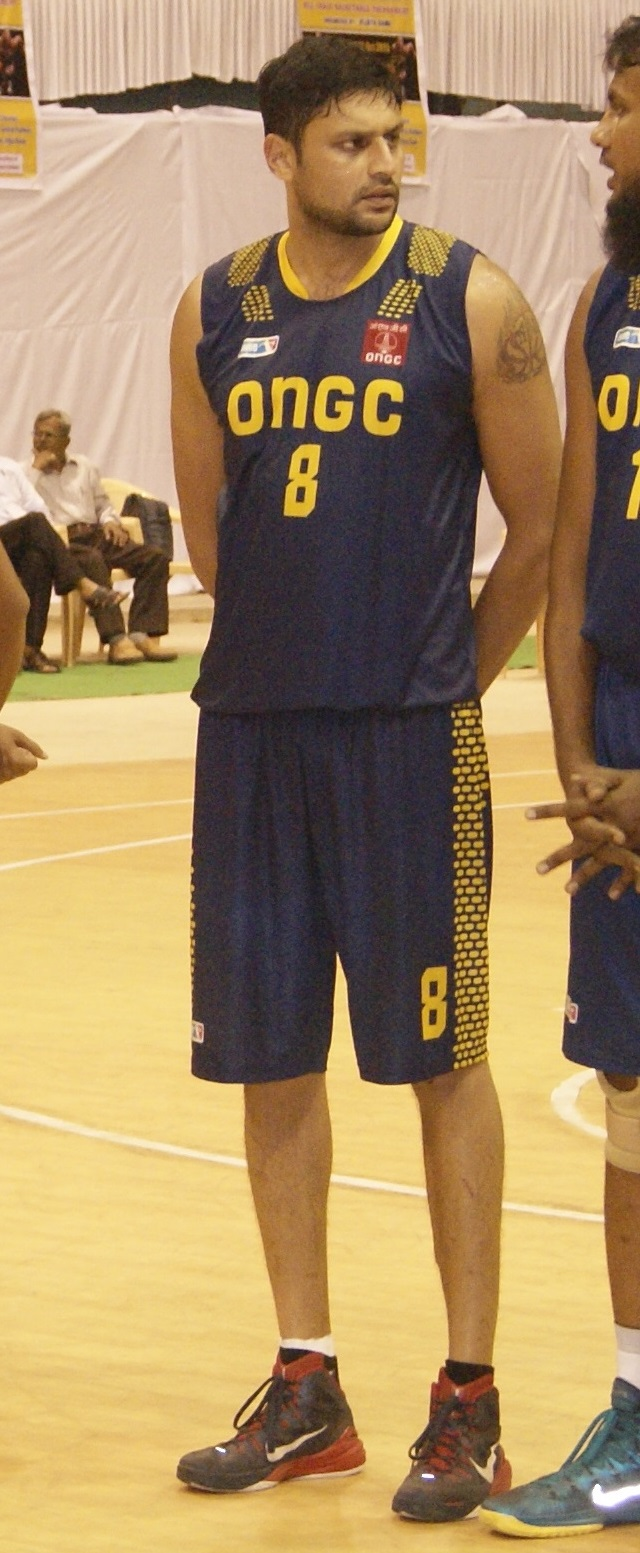
Anoop Mukkanniyil

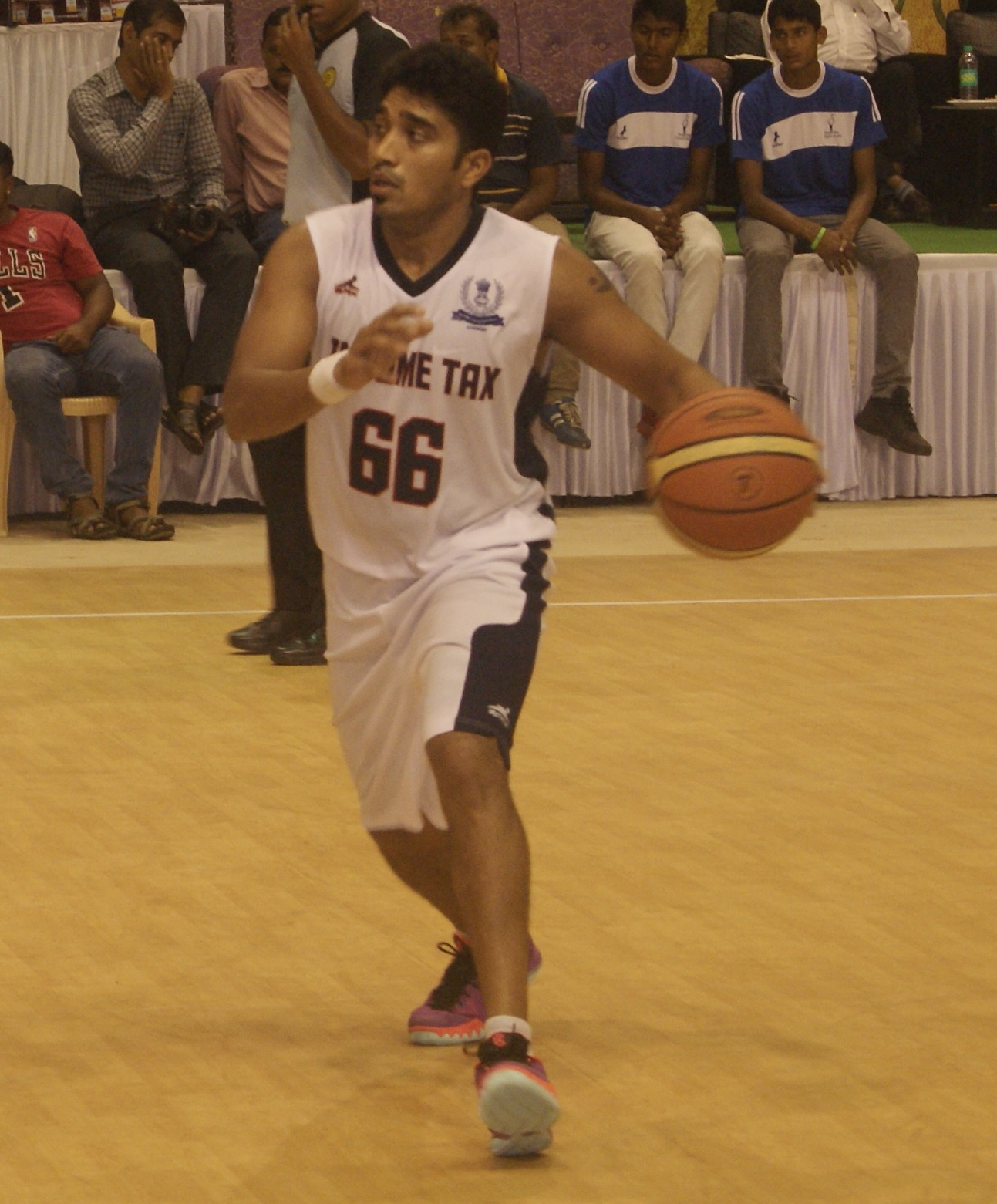
Akilan Pari

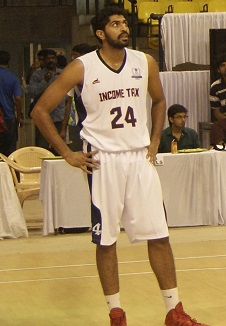
Rikin Pethani

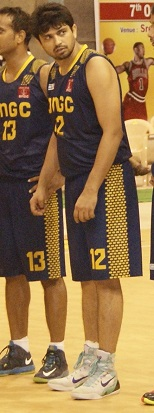
Trideep Rai

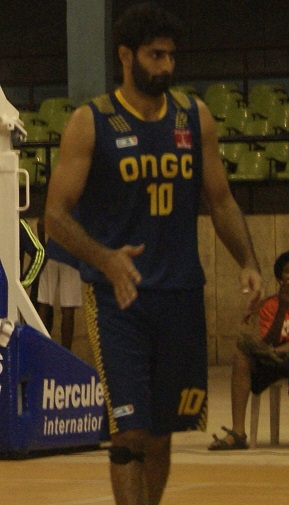
Yadwinder Singh

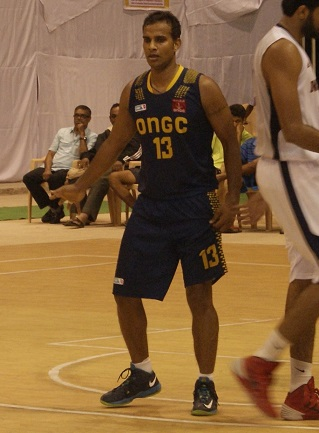
Riyaz Uddin

== Performance record ==
=== Olympics ===
Year	Host	Position	M	W	L	PF	PA	PD
1980	Moscow, Soviet Union	12th	7	0	7	458	797	−339
Total		1/21	7	0	7	458	797	−339

=== Commonwealth Games ===
Year	Host	Position	M	W	L	PF	PA	PD
2006	Melbourne, Australia	8th	5	0	5	304	474	−170
2018	Gold Coast, Australia	8th	3	0	3	222	292	−70
Total		2/2	8	0	8	526	766	−240

=== Asian Games ===
Year	Host	Position	M	W	L	PF	PA	PD
1951	New Delhi, India	4th	4	1	3	184	266	−82
1970	Bangkok, Thailand	6th	8	2	6	478	560	−82
1982	New Delhi, India	8th	9	2	7	739	651	+88
2006	Doha, Qatar	17th	2	0	2	0	40	−40
2010	Guangzhou, China	11th	6	1	5	375	507	−132
2014	Incheon, South Korea	9th	5	2	3	353	344	+9
Total		6/19	34	8	26	2129	2368	−239

- 1970: No Data vs Japan
- 1982: No Data vs North Korea
- 2006: Withdrew

=== Asia Cup ===
Year	Rank	Played	Won	Lost	PF	PA	PD
(Philippines) 1960	Did not enter						
(Taiwan) 1963	Did not enter						
(Malaysia) 1965	7th	7	4	3	491	542	−51
(South Korea) 1967	6th	9	5	4	709	797	−88
(Thailand) 1969	5th	8	4	4	748	720	+28
(Japan) 1971	6th	8	3	5	563	632	−69
(Philippines) 1973	6th	10	3	7	744	902	−158
(Thailand) 1975	4th	8	5	3	754	728	+26
(Malaysia) 1977	7th	9	7	2	957	776	+181
(Japan) 1979	5th	7	3	4	539	604	−65
(India) 1981	5th	7	3	4	521	511	+10
(Hong Kong) 1983	6th	5	2	3	298	310	−12
(Malaysia) 1985	10th	6	3	3	585	459	+126
(Thailand) 1987	6th	7	2	5	518	608	−90
(China) 1989	6th	6	2	4	472	520	−48
(Japan) 1991	13th	7	2	5	575	596	−21
(Indonesia) 1993	Did not enter						
(South Korea) 1995	13th	8	4	4	537	558	−21
(Saudi Arabia) 1997	11th	6	3	3	433	409	+24
(Japan) 1999	Did not enter						
(China) 2001	8th	6	1	5	406	508	−102
(China) 2003	8th	7	2	5	551	678	−127
(Qatar) 2005	12th	7	3	4	545	578	−33
(Japan) 2007	15th	7	2	5	468	627	−159
(China) 2009	13th	5	2	3	371	415	−44
(China) 2011	14th	5	1	4	283	310	−27
(Philippines) 2013	11th	8	2	6	532	641	−109
(China) 2015	8th	9	3	6	669	789	−120
(Lebanon) 2017	14th	3	0	3	186	249	−63
(Indonesia) 2022	16th	3	0	3	169	305	−136
(Saudi Arabia) 2025	15th	3	0	3	212	275	−63
Total	27/31	181	71	110	13,836	15,047	−1,211

=== Asia Challenge ===
Year	Host	Position	M	W	L	PF	PA	PD
2004	Taipei, Taiwan	6th	5	3	2	389	405	−16
2008	Kuwait City, Kuwait	5th	4	0	4	217	291	−74
2012	Tokyo, Japan	9th	4	0	4	294	370	−76
2014	Wuhan, China	7th	7	3	4	473	425	+48
2016	Tehran, Iran	7th	8	4	4	585	670	−85
Total		5/6	28	10	18	1958	2161	−203

=== SABA Championship ===
Year	Host	Position	M	W	L	PF	PA	PD
2002	Guwahati, India	1st	—N/a	—N/a	—N/a	—N/a	—N/a	—N/a
2014	Kathmandu, Nepal	1st	4	4	0	372	142	+230
2015	Bengaluru, India	1st	5	5	0	552	220	+332
2016	Bengaluru, India	1st	3	3	0	272	128	+144
2017	Male, Maldives	1st	4	4	0	404	218	+186
2021	Dhaka, Bangladesh	1st	3	3	0	308	120	+188
Total		6/8	19	19	0	1908	828	+1080

=== South Asian Games ===
Year	Host	Position	P	W	L	PF	PA	PD
1987	Kolkata, India	1st	—N/a	—N/a	—N/a	—N/a	—N/a	—N/a
1991	Colombo, Sri Lanka	1st	—N/a	—N/a	—N/a	—N/a	—N/a	—N/a
1995	Chennai, India	1st	—N/a	—N/a	—N/a	—N/a	—N/a	—N/a
2010	Dhaka, Bangladesh	2nd	—N/a	—N/a	—N/a	—N/a	—N/a	—N/a
2019	Kathmandu, Nepal	1st	4	4	0	471	233	+238

=== Lusofonia Games ===
Year	Host	Position	M	W	L	PF	PA	PD
2014	Goa, India	1st	4	4	0	304	245	+59
Total		1/3	4	4	0	304	245	+59

=== William Jones Cup ===
Year	Host	Rank	P	W	L	PF	PA	PD
2016	New Taipei, Taiwan	9th	8	1	7	536	638	−102
2017	Taipei, Taiwan	10th	9	0	9	628	885	−257
Total		2/44	17	1	16	1164	1523	−359

== Honours ==
Intercontinental

- Lusofonia Games
  - (gold) Gold Medal: 2014

Continental

- SABA Championship
  - (gold) Gold Medal: 2002, 2014, 2015, 2016, 2017, 2021
- South Asian Games
  - (gold) Gold Medal: 1987, 1991, 1995, 2019
  - (silver) Silver Medal: 2010

== Coaching history ==
Note: The following list may not be complete

- (Philippines) Lauro Mumar
- (India) Makolath Rajan
- (India) Keshav Kumar Chansoria – 2001
- (India) Jay Prakash Singh – 2004
- (Serbia) Zoran Lukić – 2006
- (India) Mahender Rathor – 2007
- (Serbia) Aleksandar Bućan – 2007–2010
- (United States) Bill Harris – 2010–2011
- (United States) Kenny Natt – 2011–2012
- (India) Keshav Kumar Chansoria (interim) – 2012
- (United States) Scott Flemming – 2012–2015
- (India) Sat Prakash Yadav – 2015–2017
- (India) C. V. Sunny (interim) – 2017
- (India) Bhaskar Sappaniambalam (interim) – 2017
- (United States) Phil Weber (interim) – 2017
- (Serbia) Zoran Višić – 2017–2019
- (Serbia) Veselin Matić – 2019–2024
- (United States) Scott Flemming – 2024–2026

== Results and fixtures ==
Win Loss Fixture

=== 2025 ===
27 November 2027 FIBA World Cup qualifiers	Saudi Arabia	75–51	India	Riyadh
19:00	Scoring by quarter: 28–16, 17–16, 16–11, 14–8
		Boxscore		Arena: Riyadh Green Hall

30 November 2027 FIBA World Cup qualifiers	India	57–81	Saudi Arabia	Chennai
18:00	Scoring by quarter: 9–19, 12–24, 15–26, 21–12
		Boxscore		Arena: Nehru Indoor Stadium

=== 2026 ===
27 February 2027 FIBA World Cup qualifiers	Qatar	99–73	India	Lusail
	Scoring by quarter: 28–17, 17–26, 30–9, 24–21
		Boxscore		Arena: Lusail Sports Arena

29 June 2027 FIBA World Cup qualifiers	Lebanon	99–56	India	Zouk Mikael
23:30 IST	Scoring by quarter: 25–13, 28–16, 25–14, 21–13
		Boxscore		Arena: Nouhad Nawfal Sports Complex

2 July 2027 FIBA World Cup qualifiers	India	56–65	Qatar	Amdavad
18:00 IST	Scoring by quarter: 12–7, 18–15, 14–20, 12–23
		Boxscore		Arena: Veer Savarkar Indoor Stadium

5 July 2027 FIBA World Cup qualifiers	India	72–98	Lebanon	Amdavad
20:30 IST	Scoring by quarter: 15–28, 23–20, 16–27, 19–23
		Boxscore		Arena: Veer Savarkar Indoor Stadium

== Team ==
=== 2025 roster ===
Roster for the 2025 FIBA Asia Cup.

India men's national basketball team – 2025 FIBA Asia Cup roster
Players
Coaches

Pos.	No.	Name	Age – Date of birth	Height	Club	Ctr.
PG	1	Sahaij Sekhon	23 – 1 September 2001	1.94 m (6 ft 4 in)	Chandigarh Warriors	(India)
SG	5	Harsh Dagar	20 – 23 February 2005	1.89 m (6 ft 2 in)	Uttar Pradesh	(India)
PG	7	Muin Bek Hafeez (C)	29 – 16 March 1996	1.89 m (6 ft 2 in)	Tamil Nadu	(India)
SG	8	Kanwar Sandhu	25 – 30 October 1999	1.85 m (6 ft 1 in)	Punjab Warriors	(India)
PG	10	Arvind Muthu Krishnan	25 – 16 March 2000	1.87 m (6 ft 2 in)	Tamil Nadu	(India)
C	12	Princepal Singh	24 – 3 January 2001	2.08 m (6 ft 10 in)	Indian Railways	(India)
C	15	Palpreet Singh Brar	31 – 3 January 1994	2.10 m (6 ft 11 in)	Indian Railways	(India)
PF	17	Pratyanshu Tomar	25 – 17 June 2000	2.03 m (6 ft 8 in)	Karnataka	(India)
SF	19	Pranav Prince	22 – 19 June 2003	2.00 m (6 ft 7 in)	Tamil Nadu	(India)
C	23	Amaan Sandhu	22 – 8 December 2002	2.11 m (6 ft 11 in)	Punjab Warriors	(India)
PF	24	Arvinder Singh	22 – 3 December 2002	2.00 m (6 ft 7 in)	Indian Railways	(India)
SG	34	Vaisakh Karimbingal Manoj	23 – 19 July 2002	1.90 m (6 ft 3 in)	Kerala	(India)

Head coach

- (United States) Scott Flemming

Assistant coach(es)

- (India) Rama Gantupalli
- (India) Sambhaji Kadam

Legend

- (C) Team captain
- Club – describes last
  club before the tournament
- Age – describes age
  on 5 August 2025

=== Past rosters ===
1980 Olympic Games: finished 12th among 12 teams

Baldev Singh, Ajmer Singh, Parvez Diniar, Dilip Gurumurthy, Harbhajan Singh, Jorawar Singh, Amarnath Nagarajan, Pramdiph Singh, Paramjit Singh, Radhey Shyam, Hanuman Singh, Tarlok Singh Sandhu (Coach:Makolath Rajan)

2001 Asian Championship: finished 8th among 14 teams

Vinay Kumaryadan, J.Murli, B.J. Jadeja, Mohit Bhandari, S.Sridhar, Parmindar Singh, Ranjeet Singh, Austin Almeida, Sozhasingarayer Robinson, Suresh Ranot, M.S. Sabeer Ahamed, Des Raj (Coach: Keshav Kumar Chansoria)

2003 Asian Championship: finished 8th among 16 teams

Sambhaji Kadam, Gagnesh Kumar, Mihir Pandey, S. Gopinath, S.Sridhar, Parmindar Singh, Muraleekrishna Ravindran, Trideep Rai, Sozhasingarayer Robinson, Riyaz Uddin, Snehpal Singh, Des Raj

2005 Asian Championship: finished 12th among 16 teams

Sambhaji Kadam, Shiv Kumar, Mihir Pandey, Anoop Mukkanniyil, Yadwinder Singh, Rajanna Sanjay Raj, Muraleekrishna Ravindran, Trideep Rai, Sozhasingarayer Robinson, Riyaz Uddin, Talwinderjit Singh, Jagdeep Singh (Coach: Jay Prakash Singh)

2007 Asian Championship: finished 15th among 16 teams

Sambhaji Kadam, Shiv Kumar, Ravikumar Krishnasamy, Anoop Mukkanniyil, Roshan Thankachan Padavetiyil, Rajanna Sanjay Raj, Muraleekrishna Ravindran, Trideep Rai, Dilawar Singh, Riyaz Uddin, Lokesh Yodav, Jagdeep Singh (Coach: Aleksandar Bucan)

2009 Asian Championship: finished 13th among 16 teams

Sambhaji Kadam, Talwinderjit Singh, Hareesh Koroth, Harpalsinh Vaghela, Sunil Kumar Rathee, Vishesh Bhriguvanshi, Prakash Mishra, Vineeth Revi Mathew, Abhilek Paul, Jayram Jat, Dinesh Comibatore, Jagdeep Singh (Coach: Aleksandar Bucan)

2011 Asian Championship: finished 14th among 16 teams

2011 Asian Championship roster

2011 India National Basketball Team roster
Players
Coaches

Pos.	No.	Name	Age – Date of birth	Height	Club
C	4	Amjyot Singh	20 – 27 January 1992	6 ft 8 in (2.03 m)	Punjab Police (Amateur)
C	5	Satnam Singh Bhamara	16 – 12 October 1995	7 ft 1 in (2.16 m)	IMG Academy
G	6	Hareesh Koroth	27 – 12 November 1984	6 ft 1 in (1.85 m)	Tamil Nadu (Amateur)
G	7	Prakash Mishra	29 – 5 August 1982	6 ft 0 in (1.83 m)	Indian Railways (Amateur)
C	8	Dishant Vipul Shah	20 – 3 January 1992	6 ft 8 in (2.03 m)	Gujarat (Amateur)
G	9	Vishesh Bhriguvanshi	20 – 13 September 1991	6 ft 3 in (1.91 m)	Indian Railways (Amateur)
F	10	Amitpal Singh	28 – 28 January 1984	6 ft 6 in (1.98 m)	Punjab Police (Amateur)
F	11	Narender Kumar Garewal	29 – 20 April 1983	6 ft 8 in (2.03 m)	Services (Amateur)
F	12	Trideep Rai	29 – 4 July 1983	6 ft 3 in (1.91 m)	Uttarakhand (Amateur)
SG	13	Talwinderjit Singh	25 – 26 October 1986	6 ft 0 in (1.83 m)	Punjab Police (Amateur)
C	14	Yadwinder Singh	25 – 30 December 1986	6 ft 6 in (1.98 m)	Indian Railways (Amateur)
C	15	Jagdeep Singh	19 – 10 January 1993	6 ft 6 in (1.98 m)	Punjab Police (Amateur)

Head coach

- Kenny Natt

Assistant coach(es)

- Rajinder Singh
- Pawan Kumer
- Zak Penwell

Legend

- (C) Captain
- Club denotes current pro club

2013 Asian Championship: finished 11th among 15 teams

2013 FIBA Asia Championship roster

India National Basketball Team: 2013 FIBA Asia Championship roster
Players
Coaches

Pos.	No.	Name	Age – Date of birth	Height	Club
PG	4	Sambhaji Kadam	33 – March 15, 1980	5 ft 9 in (1.75 m)	Services (amateur)
G	5	Narender Kumar Grewal	25 – June 25, 1988	6 ft 1 in (1.85 m)	Services (amateur)
F	6	Pratham Singh	22 – January 10, 1991	6 ft 0 in (1.83 m)	Tamil Nadu
F	7	Vinay Kaushik	21 – August 30, 1991	6 ft 2 in (1.88 m)
F	8	Arjun Singh	21 – June 8, 1992	6 ft 0 in (1.83 m)	N.W. Railway
F	9	Vishesh Bhriguvanshi	21 – September 13, 1991	6 ft 4 in (1.93 m)	ONGC
C	10	Amritpal Singh	22 – January 5, 1991	6 ft 11 in (2.11 m)	Punjab Police (amateur)
PG	11	Joginder Singh	25 – May 27, 1988	5 ft 9 in (1.75 m)	Services (amateur)
C	12	Satnam Singh Bhamara	17 – December 10, 1995	7 ft 4 in (2.24 m)	IMG Academy
F	13	Amjyot Singh	21 – January 27, 1992	6 ft 9 in (2.06 m)	Punjab Police (amateur)
F	14	Yadwinder Singh	26 – December 30, 1986	6 ft 5 in (1.96 m)	Indian Railways (amateur)
C	15	Rikin Shantilal Pethani	22 – December 2, 1990	6 ft 10 in (2.08 m)	Tamil Nadu

Head coach

- Scott William Flemmig

Assistant coach(es)

- Jora Singh

2014 Asian Games: finished 12th among 16 teams

2014 Asian Games roster

India men's national basketball team – 2014 Asian Games roster
Players
Coaches

Pos.	No.	Name	Age – Date of birth	Height	Club
G	4	Joginder Singh	26 – May 27, 1988	1.75 m (5 ft 9 in)	Indian Air Force	(India)
PF	5	Narender Kumar Grewal	26 – June 25, 1988	1.85 m (6 ft 1 in)	Indian Air Force	(India)
PG	6	Akilan Pari	25 – July 20, 1989	1.80 m (5 ft 11 in)	Income Tax	(India)
SG	7	Prakash Mishra	32 – May 8, 1982	1.83 m (6 ft 0 in)	Indian Railways	(India)
PF	8	Himal Chadha	15 – August 4, 1999	1.89 m (6 ft 2 in)	Indian Army	(India)
PF	9	Vishesh Bhriguvanshi	23 – September 13, 1991	1.92 m (6 ft 4 in)	Oil and Natural Gas Corporation	(India)
C	10	Amritpal Singh (C)	23 – January 5, 1991	2.07 m (6 ft 9 in)	Oil and Natural Gas Corporation	(India)
PF	11	Prasanna Venkatesh Sivakumar	21 – September 25, 1992	1.86 m (6 ft 1 in)	Indian Overseas Bank	(India)
C	12	Palpreet Singh Brar	20 – January 3, 1994	2.04 m (6 ft 8 in)	Punjab	(India)
F	13	Amjyot Singh	22 – January 27, 1992	2.03 m (6 ft 8 in)	Indian Overseas Bank	(India)
PF	14	Yadwinder Singh	27 – December 30, 1986	1.96 m (6 ft 5 in)	Oil and Natural Gas Corporation	(India)
C	15	Rikin Shantilal Pethani	23 – December 2, 1990	2.03 m (6 ft 8 in)	Indian Overseas Bank	(India)

Head coach

- (United States) Scott William Flemming

Assistant coach(es)

- (India) Rama Linga Prasad Guntupalli

Legend

- (C) Team captain
- Club – describes last
  club before the tournament
- Age – describes age
  on 19 September 2014

2015 FIBA Asia Championship: finished 8th among 16 qualified teams in Asia

2015 FIBA Asia Championship roster

India men's national basketball team – 2015 FIBA Asia Championship roster
Players
Coaches

Pos.	No.	Name	Age – Date of birth	Height	Club
F	3	Vinay Kaushik	24 – August 30, 1991	1.89 m (6 ft 2 in)	(India) Income Tax
G	4	Rajesh Prakash Uppar	24 – January 20, 1991	1.72 m (5 ft 8 in)	(India) Vijaya Bank
G	7	Siddhant Sanjay Shinde	24 – June 15, 1991	1.80 m (5 ft 11 in)	(India) Customs
G	9	Vishesh Bhriguvanshi	24 – September 13, 1991	1.93 m (6 ft 4 in)	(India) Oil and Natural Gas Corporation
C	10	Amritpal Singh	24 – January 5, 1991	2.07 m (6 ft 9 in)	(Japan) Tokyo Excellence
F	13	Vikas Kumar	26 – November 13, 1988	1.83 m (6 ft 0 in)	(India) Haryana Police
F	14	Yadwinder Singh	28 – December 30, 1986	1.96 m (6 ft 5 in)	(India) Oil and Natural Gas Corporation
F	15	Arvind Arumugam	24 – January 28, 1991	1.97 m (6 ft 6 in)	(India) Vijaya Bank
F	22	Amjyot Singh	23 – January 27, 1992	2.03 m (6 ft 8 in)	(Japan) Tokyo Excellence
G	66	Akilan Pari	26 – July 20, 1989	1.80 m (5 ft 11 in)	(India) Income Tax
C	69	Akashdeep Hazra	19 – July 1, 1996	2.13 m (7 ft 0 in)	(India) Indian Railways
F	96	Gurvinder Singh Gill	19 – January 21, 1996	2.00 m (6 ft 7 in)	(India) Punjab

Head coach

- (India) Sat Prakash Yadav

2017 FIBA Asia Cup

2017 FIBA Asia Cup roster

India men's national basketball team – 2017 FIBA Asia Cup roster
Players
Coaches

Pos.	No.	Name	Age – Date of birth	Height	Club	Ctr.
PF	6	Aravind Annadurai	24 – July 5, 1993	2.00 m (6 ft 7 in)	Indian overseas bank	(India)
G	7	tanmay shende	18 – July 22, 1999	1.86 m (6 ft 1 in)	Vijaya Bank Bangalore	(India)
G	8	Rajvir Singh (basketball)	21 – October 25, 1995	1.88 m (6 ft 2 in)	Punjab Police	(India)
G	9	Vishesh Bhriguvanshi	25 – September 13, 1991	1.92 m (6 ft 4 in)	Adelaide 36ers	(Australia)
C	10	Amritpal Singh (basketball)	26 – January 5, 1991	2.10 m (6 ft 11 in)	Sydney Kings	(Australia)
C	15	Rikin Pethani	26 – December 2, 1990	2.03 m (6 ft 8 in)	Income Tax Chennai	(India)
F	22	Amjyot Singh	25 – January 27, 1992	2.03 m (6 ft 8 in)	Punjab Police	(India)
PG	24	Baladhaneshwar Poiyamozhi	17 – December 7, 1999	1.79 m (5 ft 10 in)	Indian overseas bank	(India)
G	46	Prasanna Sivakumar	24 – September 25, 1992	1.86 m (6 ft 1 in)	Indian overseas bank	(India)
C	52	Satnam Singh Bhamara	21 – December 10, 1995	2.18 m (7 ft 2 in)	Texas Legends	(United States)
F	77	Muin Bek Hafeez	21 – March 16, 1996	1.90 m (6 ft 3 in)	Indian overseas bank	(India)
PG	99	Talwinderjit Singh	30 – October 20, 1986	1.83 m (6 ft 0 in)		(India)

Head coach

- (United States) Philip John Weber

Assistant coach(es)

- (United States) Steven Philip John Klei
- (India) Sebastian Padipurakkal Joseph
- (India) Baskar Sappaniambalam

Legend

- (C) Team captain
- (NP) Naturalized player
- Club – describes last
  club before the tournament
- Age – describes age
  on 8 August 2017

2019 FIBA Basketball World Cup qualification

2019 FIBA Basketball World Cup qualification

India men's national basketball team roster
Players
Coaches

Pos.	No.	Name	Age – Date of birth	Height	Club	Ctr.
SF	4	Arshpreet Bhullar	22 – October 2, 1996	1.90 m (6 ft 3 in)	Pune Peshwas	(India)
PG	23	Shahab Jamal	21 – September 25, 1995	1.85 m (6 ft 1 in)	Pune Peshwas	(India)
PF	6	Aravind Annadurai	24 – July 5, 1993	2.00 m (6 ft 7 in)	Indian Overseas Bank	(India)
C	10	Amritpal Singh	26 – January 5, 1991	2.08 m (6 ft 10 in)	Sydney Kings	(Australia)
C	13	Jagdeep Singh	31 – January 10, 1986	1.98 m (6 ft 6 in)	Punjab Police Jalandhar	(India)
C	15	Rikin Pethani	27 – December 2, 1990	2.03 m (6 ft 8 in)	Chennai Slam	(India)
F	25	Arvind Arumugam	27 – January 28, 1991	1.99 m (6 ft 6 in)	Vijaya Bank	(India)
F/C	40	Gurvinder Gill	22 – January 21, 1996	2.00 m (6 ft 7 in)	Punjab Steelers	(India)
G/F	46	Prasanna Sivakumar	25 – September 25, 1992	1.86 m (6 ft 1 in)
C	52	Satnam Singh Bhamara	23 – October 12, 1995	2.18 m (7 ft 2 in)	Texas Legends	(United States)
	60	Prudhvishwar Ambati	22 – January 23, 1996			(India)

Head coach

- (Serbia) Zoran Višić

Assistant coach(es)

- (India) Sambhaji Kadam

Legend

- (C) Team captain
- Club – describes last
  club before the tournament
- Age – describes age
  on 23 November 2017

2022 FIBA Asia Cup qualification

2022 FIBA Asia Cup qualification

India national basketball team – 2021 FIBA Asia Cup qualification roster
Players
Coaches

Pos.	No.	Name	Age – Date of birth	Height	Club	Ctr.
PG	1	Sahaij Sekhon	19 – 1 September 2001	1.94 m (6 ft 4 in)	GGDSD College	(India)
PG	4	Joginder Singh	32 – 27 May 1988	1.75 m (5 ft 9 in)	Services	(India)
F	7	Muin Bek Hafeez	24 – 16 March 1996	1.90 m (6 ft 3 in)	Indian Bank Chennai BC	(India)
G	9	Vishesh Bhriguvanshi (C)	29 – 13 September 1991	1.92 m (6 ft 4 in)	ONGC	(India)
SG	10	Rajeev Kumar	19 – 6 October 2001	1.90 m (6 ft 3 in)	Indian Air Force	(India)
F	11	Manoj Manjunatha	17 – 30 April 2003	1.99 m (6 ft 6 in)
C	15	Jagdeep Singh	35 – 10 January 1986	1.98 m (6 ft 6 in)	Punjab Police	(India)
PF	18	Aravind Annadurai	27 – 5 July 1993	2.00 m (6 ft 7 in)	Karnataka	(India)
F	22	Amjyot Gill	29 – 27 January 1992	2.03 m (6 ft 8 in)	Punjab Police	(India)
F	23	Amaan Sandhu	18 – 8 December 2002	2.03 m (6 ft 8 in)	Punjab	(India)
C	77	Vivek Goti	26 – 5 July 1994	2.10 m (6 ft 11 in)	Gujarat	(India)
PF	78	Prashant Singh Rawat	20 – 15 August 2000	2.02 m (6 ft 8 in)	Uttarakhand	(India)

Head coach

- (Serbia) Veselin Matić

Assistant coach(es)

- (India) Pradeep Tomar

Legend

- (C) Team captain
- Club – describes last
  club before the tournament
- Age – describes age
  on 21 February 2021

== See also ==
- Basketball in India
- India national under-19 basketball team
- India national under-17 basketball team
- India national 3x3 team
