= Memi Bečirović =

Slovenian basketball coach

Jiangsu Dragons
- Position: assistant coach
- League: CBA

Personal information
- Born: 1 March 1961 (age 65) Slovenska Bistrica, PR Slovenia, FPR Yugoslavia
- Coaching career: 1986–present

Career history

Coaching
- 1986–1993: Slovenska Bistrica
- 1993–1994: Maribor Branik U16
- 1995–1996: Bawaria Voltex (youth)
- 1997–1998: Satex Maribor
- 1998–1999: Branik Maribor
- 1999–2000: Union Olimpija (youth)
- 2000–2002: Slovenia U20
- 2002–2003: KK Rogla
- 2003–2004: Elektra Šoštanj
- 2004–2005: Rimini Crabs
- 2005–2007: Helios Domžale
- 2007–2008: Union Olimpija
- 2008–2009: Azovmash
- 2009–2010: Oostende
- 2009–2010: Slovenia
- 2012–2013: Mahram Tehran
- 2012–2015: Iran
- 2015: Union Olimpija
- 2015: Jiangsu Dragons (assistant)
- 2015–2020: Jiangsu Dragons
- 2020–2021: Nanjing Monkey Kings
- 2024: Nanjing Monkey Kings (interim)
- 2024–2025: Nanjing Monkey Kings
- 2026–present: Jiangsu Dragons (assistant)

Career highlights
- As head coach: Slovenian League champion (2007); Slovenian Cup champion (2007); Ukrainian League champion (2009); 2x FIBA Asia Cup (2012, 2014); FIBA Asia Championship (2013)

Mehmed "Memi" Bečirović (born 1 March 1961) is a Slovenian professional basketball coach serving as the assistant coach for the Jiangsu Dragons of the Chinese Basketball Association (CBA). He coached over ten teams in Slovenia, Italy, Ukraine, Belgium, and China in his coaching career. As the head coach of the Iran national team, Bečirović led the team to its first and second FIBA Asia Cup championship in the fourth and fifth edition of the tournament in Tokyo and Wuhan in 2012 and 2014. He also led Iran to their third title in the 2013 FIBA Asia Championship and qualified for the 2014 FIBA Basketball World Cup in Spain. He then led Iran to the silver medal at the 2014 Asian Games.

He was the head coach of the Slovenia national team from December 2009 until December 2010, when he was replaced by Božidar Maljković. He coached the national team at the 2010 FIBA World Championship in Turkey. This was his first position as head of a senior international team, after previously coaching the Slovenian junior team at various age levels between 1997 and 2003. Bečirović's son, Sani, was a professional basketball player himself, and currently works as a sporting director. Having worked for Cedevita Olimpija and Panathinaikos, he currently works for Zenit Saint Petersburg.
