= Sajjad Mashayekhi =

Iranian basketball player

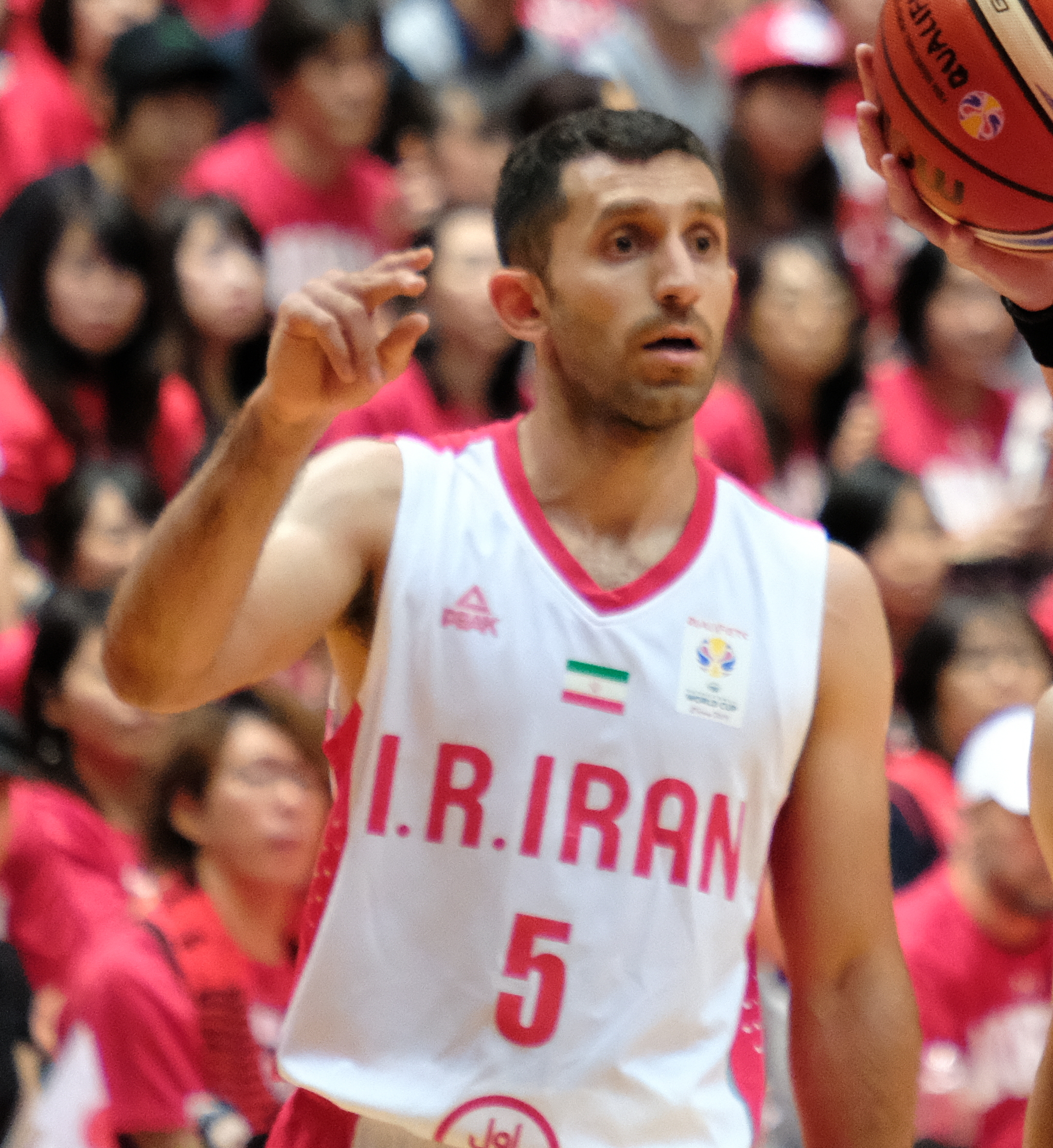
- Mashayekhi in 2019 FIBA Basketball World Cup

No. 5 – Zob Ahan Isfahan BC
- Position: Point guard
- League: IBSL

Personal information
- Born: 23 February 1994 (age 32) Tehran, Iran
- Listed height: 5 ft 11 in (1.80 m)
- Listed weight: 170 lb (77 kg)

Career history
- 2010–2014: Mahram Tehran
- 2015: Chemidor Tehran BC
- 2016: Palayesh Naft Abadan BC
- 2017–2019: Petrochimi Bandar Imam
- 2020: Zob Ahan Isfahan BC
Medals
Men's basketball
Representing Iran
Asian Games
Silver medal – second place	2018 Jakarta	Team
Silver medal – second place	2014 Incheon	Team
Asian Championship
Silver medal – second place	2017 Beirut
Bronze medal – third place	2015 Changsha
Asian Cup
Gold medal – first place	2012 Tokyo
Gold medal – first place	2014 Wuhan
Gold medal – first place	2016 Tehran
Asian Under-18 Championship
Bronze medal – third place	2012 Mongolia
William Jones Cup
Gold medal – first place	2015 Taipei
Silver medal – second place	2012 Taipei

Sajjad Mashayekhi (Persian: سجاد مشایخی, born 23 February 1994) is an Iranian professional basketball player and gold medal at Asian Cup 2012 Tokyo and 2014 Wuhan and 2016 Tehran. He has played for the Iranian national basketball team.

== Honors ==
National Team

- Asia Challenge
  - Gold medal: 2012, 2014, 2016
- Asian Games
  - Silver medal: 2014, 2018
- Asian Under-18 Championship
  - Bronze medal: 2012
- William Jones Cup
  - Gold medal: 2015
  - Silver medal: 2012
- FIBA Asian Cup
  - Silver medal: 2017
  - Bronze medal: 2015
