= Lebanon men's national basketball team =

Lebanon
- FIBA ranking: 33 ▼2 (September 1, 2026)
- Joined FIBA: 1947
- FIBA zone: FIBA Asia
- National federation: Lebanese Basketball Federation (FLB)
- Coach: Ahmad Farran
- Nickname: The Cedars

FIBA World Cup
- Appearances: 4

FIBA Asia Cup
- Appearances: 11
- Medals: (silver) Silver: (2001, 2005, 2007, 2022)

European Championship
- Appearances: 2
Home	Away
Medal record
FIBA Asia Cup
Silver medal – second place	2001 China
Silver medal – second place	2005 Qatar
Silver medal – second place	2007 Japan
Silver medal – second place	2022 Indonesia
FIBA Asia Challenge
Gold medal – first place	2010 Lebanon
Arab Championship
Gold medal – first place	2022 United Arab Emirates
Silver medal – second place	2010 Lebanon
Bronze medal – third place	1974 Iraq
Pan Arab Games
Gold medal – first place	1954 Lebanon	Team
Silver medal – second place	1961 Morocco	Team
WABA Championship
Gold medal – first place	2000 Lebanon
Gold medal – first place	2008 Jordan
Gold medal – first place	2012 Jordan
Gold medal – first place	2015 Jordan
Gold medal – first place	2017 Jordan
Silver medal – second place	1999 Lebanon
Silver medal – second place	2001 Jordan
Silver medal – second place	2005 Lebanon
Silver medal – second place	2013 Iran

The Lebanon men's national basketball team (Arabic: منتخب لبنان لكرة السلة; French: Équipe du Liban de basket-ball), controlled by the Lebanese Basketball Federation (FLB), has represented Lebanon in basketball since its inception in 1947. The squad is governed by FIBA, and is part of the FIBA Asia zone.

Lebanon has achieved success throughout its history, finishing as runners-up in the FIBA Asia Cup on four occasions: 2001, 2005, 2007, and most recently in 2022. The team has also made appearances in the FIBA World Championship on four occasions (2002, 2006, 2010, and 2023), but have not progressed beyond the preliminary round.

== History ==
=== Early history (1949–1953) ===
Basketball arrived in Lebanon in the mid-1920s, initially introduced at the American University of Beirut. The official organization of basketball in the country began in 1949 with the establishment of the Lebanese Basketball Federation (French: Fédération Libanaise de Basketball). This period also saw the founding of the Lebanese Volleyball Federation, marking a key moment for Lebanese sports development.

The early years of international competition for Lebanon involved a unique approach. The Soviet Union's refusal to host Eurobasket 1949 and FIBA Europe's decision not to ask Czechoslovakia to host consecutive tournaments led to Egypt, the Eurobasket 1947 bronze medalist, hosting the competition. Due to travel challenges and concerns, few European teams participated. In an unconventional move, Lebanon and Syria, both Asian countries, were invited to participate in this European championship. Making their Eurobasket 1949 debut, Lebanon finished in seventh place after losing all six games in the seven-team round-robin format.

The team's second attempt at the European competition came at the Eurobasket 1953 in Moscow. During the preliminary rounds, Lebanon lost all four games, including one by forfeit due to their decision not to play against Israel. Their first victory in the tournament came against Sweden in the classification round, marking a significant milestone as Lebanon's first win in Eurobasket history. Placing fourth in their five-team group, Lebanon advanced to the 13–16 classification games. While they narrowly lost to West Germany (58–56), they secured a victory over Denmark (74–40), ultimately finishing 15th out of the 17 participating teams.

=== 2000–2010: Three-time Asian runners-up and World Cup Appearances ===
Lebanon achieved notable results in the early 2000s, solidifying their presence in the Asian basketball landscape. They finished second at the 2001 ABC Championship after a 63–97 loss to China in the final. The tournament showcased the skills of Lebanon's guard, Walid Doumiati, who was awarded the tournament's Best Playmaker. Alongside him, forward Fadi El Khatib also earned a spot on the All-Star Five lineup. This silver medal secured Lebanon's participation in the 2002 FIBA World Championship, though their journey ended in the first round of the tournament.

Lebanon repeated their performance by reaching the finals again at the 2005 FIBA Asia Championship. However, their attempt to win the championship was unsuccessful against China, with Lebanon losing 61–77. Fadi El Khatib's performance earned him recognition as the tournament's Best Forward. Additionally, center Joe Vogel also secured a spot in the All-Star Five lineup. Finishing as runners-up granted Lebanon a ticket to the 2006 FIBA World Championship. Although the team secured victories against Venezuela (82–72) and France (74–73), they narrowly missed qualifying for the round of 16 in the World Championship.

The following year, Lebanon achieved second place for the third time at the 2007 FIBA Asia Championship, facing a 74–69 loss to Iran in the final. This loss prevented Lebanon from directly qualifying for the 2008 Summer Olympics. They then entered a separate qualifying tournament where 12 teams competed for the final three Olympic berths. But their journey ended in the Preliminary Round after losing their two games.

At the 2009 FIBA Asia Championship, Lebanon's reached the semifinals. Although they fell short of automatic qualification for the 2010 FIBA World Championship after losses to China and Jordan, Lebanon received a wildcard entry, securing their third consecutive World Cup appearance. Despite a victory against Canada (81–71), Lebanon couldn't progress beyond the group stage in the 2010 FIBA World Championship.

=== 2013 FIBA suspension ===
Lebanon encountered a difficult period in July 2013 when the International Basketball Federation FIBA imposed an indefinite suspension. This suspension resulted from unresolved internal conflicts within the Lebanese Basketball Federation. Consequently, FIBA Asia suspended Lebanon from participating in all sanctioned events, effectively barring the country from international competitions until further notice.

The suspension had significant consequences, particularly impacting Lebanon's participation in the 2013 FIBA Asia Championship. This tournament served as a qualifying event for the 2014 FIBA Basketball World Cup in Spain. Despite securing a spot in the 2013 FIBA Asia Championship based on their second-place finish in the 2013 West Asian Basketball Championship, the national federation's suspension led to their exclusion from the tournament.

Following discussions and appeals, FIBA lifted the ban in May 2014, allowing Lebanon's national team to return to international basketball competitions.

=== 2020–present: Asian runners-up and return to the World Cup ===
Lebanon displayed a significant resurgence in international basketball, culminating in a noteworthy performance at the 2022 FIBA Asia Cup, marking their return to the finals in over a decade. Despite a close contest, Lebanon finished in second place after a narrow 73–75 defeat to Australia. This marked Lebanon's fourth silver medal at the FIBA Asia Cup, adding to their previous runner-up finishes in 2001, 2005, and 2007. The tournament also highlighted the performance of Lebanon's point guard, Wael Arakji, who earned the tournament MVP title, best guard, and a spot on the All-Star Five.

Building on this success, Lebanon continued their journey by securing qualification for the 2023 FIBA Basketball World Cup. Despite facing a challenging first round with three losses, Lebanon demonstrated determination, closing their World Cup campaign with consecutive victories. They secured wins against Ivory Coast (94–84) and Iran (81–73), during the classification round, concluding their World Cup appearance on a high note.

Lebanon's 23rd place finish at the 2023 FIBA Basketball World Cup granted them entry into the 2024 FIBA Men's Olympic Qualifying Tournaments. These tournaments involved twenty-four teams competing for the remaining four slots in the 2024 Summer Olympics basketball competition. Lebanon competed in the qualifiers but did not advance, recording a performance of one victory and two defeats.

== Competitive record ==
=== FIBA World Cup ===
World Cup						Qualification		
Year	Position	Pld	W	L	Squad	Pld	W	L
1950 to 1970	did not enter					did not enter		
(Puerto Rico) 1974	did not qualify					did not qualify		
(Philippines) 1978	did not enter					did not enter		
1982 to 1998	did not qualify					did not qualify		
(United States) 2002	16th place	5	0	5	Squad	FIBA Asia Cup served as qualifiers		
(Japan) 2006	17th place	5	2	3	Squad	FIBA Asia Cup served as qualifiers		
(Turkey) 2010	20th place	5	1	4	Squad	wild card		
(Spain) 2014	suspended					suspended		
(China) 2019	did not qualify					12	6	6
(Philippines) (Japan) (Indonesia) 2023	23rd place	5	2	3	Squad	12	9	3
(Qatar) 2027	to be determined					in progress		
(France) 2031	to be determined					to be determined		
Total	4/20	20	5	15		24	15	9

=== Olympic Games ===
Olympic Games					Qualifying		
Year	Position	Pld	W	L	Pld	W	L
1936 to 1996	did not enter						
(Australia) 2000	did not qualify				FIBA Asia Cup served as qualifiers		
(Greece) 2004	did not qualify				FIBA Asia Cup served as qualifiers		
(China) 2008	did not qualify				2	0	2
(United Kingdom) 2012	did not qualify				did not qualify		
(Brazil) 2016	did not qualify				did not qualify		
(Japan) 2020	did not qualify				did not qualify		
(France) 2024	did not qualify				3	1	2
(United States) 2028	to be determined				to be determined		
Total	0	0	0	0	5	1	4

=== EuroBasket ===
EuroBasket
Year	Position	Pld	W	L
(Egypt) 1949	7th place	7	1	6
(Soviet Union) 1953	15th place	7	2	5
Total		14	3	11

=== FIBA Asia Cup ===
FIBA Asia Cup						Qualification		
Year	Position	Pld	W	L	Squad	Pld	W	L
1960 to 1997	did not enter					did not enter		
(Japan) 1999	7th place	7	4	3	Squad	WABA Championship served as qualifiers		
(China) 2001	Runners-up	8	5	3	Squad	WABA Championship served as qualifiers		
(China) 2003	4th place	8	5	3	Squad	directly qualified		
(Qatar) 2005	Runners-up	8	6	2	Squad	WABA Championship served as qualifiers		
(Japan) 2007	Runners-up	8	6	2	Squad	directly qualified		
(China) 2009	4th place	9	5	4	Squad	directly qualified		
(China) 2011	6th place	9	4	5	Squad	directly qualified as the champions of 2010 FIBA Asia Stanković Cup		
(Philippines) 2013	suspended					WABA Championship served as qualifiers		
(China) 2015	5th place	9	5	4	Squad	WABA Championship served as qualifiers		
(Lebanon) 2017	6th place	7	4	3	Squad	qualified as host		
(Indonesia) 2022	Runners-up	6	5	1	Squad	6	6	0
(Saudi Arabia) 2025	8th place	5	2	3	Squad	6	6	0
Total	11/31	84	51	33		12	12	0

=== West Asian Basketball Championship ===
WABA Championship
Year	Position	Pld	W	L
(Lebanon) 1999	Runners-up	4	3	1
(Lebanon) 2000	Champions	4	4	0
(Jordan) 2001	Runners-up	4	3	1
(Jordan) (Iran) 2002	did not enter			
(Iran) 2004	4th place	4	1	3
(Lebanon) 2005	Runners-up	4	3	1
(Jordan) 2008	Champions	3	3	0
(Iraq) 2010	did not enter			
(Iraq) 2011	did not enter			
(Jordan) 2012	Champions	5	5	0
(Iran) 2013	Runners-up	3	2	1
(Jordan) 2014	did not enter			
(Jordan) 2015	Champions	4	4	0
(Jordan) 2016	4th place	4	1	3
(Jordan) 2017	Champions	5	5	0
Total	12/15	44	34	10

=== FIBA Asia Challenge ===
The FIBA Asia Challenge, a basketball tournament held every two years for Asian national teams, was previously known as the FIBA Asia Stanković Cup (2004–2010) and FIBA Asia Cup (2012–2014). Lebanon participated in the tournament twice (2010 and 2012) and emerged victorious in 2010. This championship win granted them automatic qualification for the 2011 FIBA Asia Championship.

FIBA Asia Challenge
Year	Position	Pld	W	L
(Taiwan) 2004	did not enter			
(Kuwait) 2008	did not enter			
(Lebanon) 2010	Champions	7	7	0
(Japan) 2012	7th place	7	4	3
(China) 2014	did not enter			
(Iran) 2016	did not enter			
Total	2/6	14	11	3

== Team ==
=== Current roster ===
Roster for the 2025 FIBA Asia Cup.

Lebanon men's national basketball team – 2025 FIBA Asia Cup roster
Players
Coaches

Pos.	No.	Name	Age – Date of birth	Height	Club	Ctr.
SF	1	Omar Jamaleddine	25 – 13 June 2000	1.94 m (6 ft 4 in)	Kawasaki Brave Thunders	(Japan)
SG	5	Amir Saoud (C)	34 – 18 January 1991	1.87 m (6 ft 2 in)	Al Riyadi	(Lebanon)
SG	7	Karim Zeinoun	26 – 16 June 1999	1.88 m (6 ft 2 in)	Al Riyadi	(Lebanon)
SG	9	Sergio El Darwich	29 – 25 July 1996	1.95 m (6 ft 5 in)	Beirut Club	(Lebanon)
PG	10	Ali Mansour	27 – 1 January 1998	1.85 m (6 ft 1 in)	Al Riyadi	(Lebanon)
PF	11	Dedric Lawson (NP)	27 – 1 October 1997	2.06 m (6 ft 9 in)	Xinjiang Flying Tigers	(China)
PG	20	Wael Arakji	30 – 4 September 1994	1.93 m (6 ft 4 in)	Al-Ula	(Saudi Arabia)
F	23	Youssef Khayat	22 – 11 March 2003	2.05 m (6 ft 9 in)	Sagesse	(Lebanon)
PF	24	Hayk Gyokchyan	35 – 11 December 1989	2.03 m (6 ft 8 in)	Al Riyadi	(Lebanon)
PG	25	Ali Mezher	31 – 22 March 1994	1.82 m (6 ft 0 in)	Akita Northern Happinets	(Japan)
C	34	Gerard Hadidian	30 – 21 April 1995	2.02 m (6 ft 8 in)	Sagesse	(Lebanon)
PF	40	Ali Haidar	35 – 20 July 1990	2.03 m (6 ft 8 in)	Sagesse	(Lebanon)

Head coach

- (Lebanon) Ahmad Farran

Assistant coach(es)

- (Lebanon) Ahmad Yamout

Legend

- (C) Team captain
- (NP) Naturalized player
- Club – describes last
  club before the tournament
- Age – describes age
  on 5 August 2025

=== Head coach history ===
- (Lebanon) Gabi Arabji
- (Lebanon) Henri Yabroudi
- (Lebanon) Albert Mamo
- (France) Milo Monosour: 1997
- (Lebanon) Rizkallah Zalloum: 1997–?
- (United States) Andrew Young: 1999–?
- (United States) Johnny Neumann: 2001–2002
- (Lebanon) Ghassan Sarkis: 2003–?
- (United States) Paul Coughter: 2005–2006
- (Lebanon) Fouad Abou Chakra: 2007
- (Serbia) Dragan Raca: 2007–2009
- (United States) Tab Baldwin: 2010–2011
- (Lebanon) Ghassan Sarkis: 2011–2015
- (Serbia) Veselin Matić: 2015–2016
- (Lebanon) Patrick Saba: 2016–2017
- (Lebanon) Joe Moujaes: 2017
- (Lithuania) Ramūnas Butautas: 2017–2018
- (Slovenia) Slobodan Subotić: 2018–2019
- (Lebanon) Joe Moujaes: 2019–2022
- (Lebanon) Jad El Hajj: 2022–2024
- (Serbia) Miodrag Perišić: 2024–2025
- (Lebanon) Ahmad Farran 2025-present

== See also ==
- Sport in Lebanon
- Lebanon men's national under-19 basketball team
- Lebanon men's national under-17 basketball team
- Lebanon women's national basketball team
- Lebanon women's national under-19 basketball team
- Lebanon women's national under-17 basketball team
