= Sozhasingarayer Robinson =

Indian basketball player (born 1980)

Personal information
- Born: 23 June 1980 (age 46) Pondicherry, India
- Listed height: 6 ft 8 in (2.03 m)
- Listed weight: 249 lb (113 kg)

Career information
- Playing career: 2005–?
- Position: Power forward / center

Career highlights
- FIBA Asia Stanković Cup (2004)

Sozhasingarayer Robinson, also widely known as simply S. Robinson (born 23 June 1980 in Pondicherry, India) is a professional Indian basketball player. He played for the Tamil Nadu Basketball Team which competes in the India National Cup.

== Career overview ==
Sozhasingarayer Robinson, born in Pondicherry, grew up in Gujarat, India. A standout athlete in India, Robinson started to gain international media attention when he led India with 36 points to a surprise victory at the 2004 FIBA Asia Stanković Cup against South Korea, a regular competitor for the title at international tournaments in Asia.

For unknown reasons, he did not take the offer to play professionally in New Zealand in 2006, following extraordinary performances against the Tall Blacks. In that same year he was banned from representing his state's basketball team for missing its training camp. Robinson is known as being extremely outspoken as he severely criticized the lack of support for India's national basketball team from which he retired in 2006 only to try a comeback a little later. Robinson is one of the most well known figures in Indian basketball. Altogether, he played professional in basketball for the following teams:

- 2003-04 Negar sang Sharekord (Iran)
- 2004 Indian Overseas Bank Chennai (India)
- 2004 Farsh Mashad (Iran)
- 2005 Tamil Nadu (India)
- 2005-06 Indian Overseas Bank Chennai (India)
- 2006 offer sheet Auckland Stars (New Zealand) , never played
- 2010 Indian Army (India)

== Achievements ==
- 2001, 2005-06 India national basketball team
- 2010: Ramu Memorial Basketball Tournament (RMBT) MVP
