= Gurumurthy =

Gurumurthy or Guru-Murthy is a surname. Notable people with the surname include:

- Dilip Gurumurthy (born 1956), Indian basketball player
- Geeta Guru-Murthy, British television journalist
- Krishnan Guru-Murthy (born 1970), British journalist
- Swaminathan Gurumurthy (born 1949), Indian magazine editor
