= 2012 FIBA Asia Cup =

4th Asia Cup
- Official logo of the 2012 FIBA Asia Cup

Tournament details
- Host country: Japan
- Dates: September 14–22
- Teams: 10 (from 44 federations)
- Venue: 1 (in 1 host city)

Final positions
- Champions: Iran (1st title)

Tournament statistics
- MVP: (Iran) Samad Nikkhah Bahrami
- Top scorer: (Lebanon) El Khatib (28.3)
- Top rebounds: (India) Amr. Singh (11.5)
- Top assists: (India) Bhriguvanshi (6.5)
- PPG (Team): Lebanon (82.9)
- RPG (Team): China (46.4)
- APG (Team): Lebanon (17.3)

Official website
- 2012 FIBA Asia Cup

2012 FIBA Asia Cup was the 4th FIBA Asia Cup, the basketball tournament of FIBA Asia was held at the Ota City General Gymnasium, in Ota, Tokyo, Japan from September 14–22, 2012. The winner of this year's FIBA Asia Cup automatically qualifies for the FIBA Asia Championship in 2013.

== Qualification ==
According to the FIBA Asia rules, each zone had one place, and the hosts (Japan) and Asian champion (China) were automatically qualified. The other two places are allocated to the zones according to performance in the 2011 FIBA Asia Championship.

Central Asia (1)	East Asia (2+1+1)	Gulf (1)	South Asia (1)	Southeast Asia (1)	West Asia (1+1)
Uzbekistan	Japan	Qatar	India	Philippines	Lebanon
	China				Iran
	Chinese Taipei				
	Macau				

== Draw ==
The draw was held on July 1 at Tokyo.

Group A	Group B
China; Lebanon; Macau; Philippines*; Uzbekistan*	Iran; Chinese Taipei; Qatar; Japan; India*

- The draw was conducted before the qualifiers from Southeast Asia, Central Asia and South Asia were known.

== Preliminary round ==
=== Group A ===
Team	Pld	W	L	PF	PA	PD	Pts	Tiebreaker
Lebanon	4	3	1	361	247	+114	7	1–1 / 1.068
Philippines	4	3	1	329	235	+94	7	1–1 / 1.050
China	4	3	1	353	250	+103	7	1–1 / 0.892
Uzbekistan	4	1	3	227	337	−110	5	
Macau	4	0	4	204	405	−201	4	

September 14
11:30

Report

Macau	51–120	Lebanon
Scoring by quarter: 17–32, 8–30, 8–30, 18–28
Pts: Lo H.M. 14; Rebs: Cai S.B., Lai K.T. 4 Asts: Cheong T.F. 9		Pts: Stephan 24; Rebs: Hawe, El Khatib 7 Asts: Five players 4

Ota Gymnasium, Tokyo
Referees: Yasser Abbas (QAT), Huang Yi-chi (TPE), Yuki Kubo (JPN)

September 14
16:30

Report

Philippines	68–71	China
Scoring by quarter: 15–18, 18–22, 23–14, 12–17
Pts: De Ocampo 11; Rebs: Norwood, Douthit 8 Asts: Tenorio 4		Pts: Guo A.L. 18; Rebs: Wang Z.L. 14; Asts: Guo A.L., Cao F. 2

Ota Gymnasium, Tokyo
Referees: Yoji Fujigaki (JPN), Amir Hossein Safarzadeh (IRI), Rajnarayan Patro (IND)

September 15
11:30

Report

Uzbekistan	81–61	Macau
Scoring by quarter: 14–11, 12–16, 26–8, 29–26
Pts: Kozlov 24; Rebs: Kozlov 15; Asts: Kozlov, Denisov 3		Pts: Lao F.I. 21; Rebs: Lai K.T. 5 Asts: Iong K.K., Cheong T.F. 3

Ota Gymnasium, Tokyo
Referees: Yoji Higashi (JPN), Rajnarayan Patro (IND), Yasser Abbas (QAT)

September 15
19:00

Report

Lebanon	68–78	Philippines
Scoring by quarter: 20–19, 21–19, 12–21, 15–19
Pts: El Khatib 24; Rebs: El Khatib 15; Asts: El Khatib 4		Pts: Douthit 25; Rebs: Douthit 21; Asts: Four players 2

Ota Gymnasium, Tokyo
Referees: Huang Yi-chi (TPE), Yuki Kubo (JPN), Reza Javadi (IRI)

September 16
14:00

Report

Philippines	85–50	Uzbekistan
Scoring by quarter: 23–16, 16–5, 24–12, 22–17
Pts: Chan 20; Rebs: Ganuelas 11; Asts: Tenorio 5		Pts: Denisov 16; Rebs: Juginisov 10; Asts: Kozlov 5

Ota Gymnasium, Tokyo
Referees: Rajnarayan Patro (IND), Yoji Fujigaki (JPN), Amir Hossein Safarzadeh (IRI)

September 16
16:30

Report

China	69–89	Lebanon
Scoring by quarter: 22–15, 8–25, 21–20, 18–29
Pts: Zhao T.L., Zhang D.Y. 12; Rebs: Zhao T.L. 9 Asts: Sui R. 5		Pts: Abdelnour, El Khatib 25; Rebs: El Khatib 10; Asts: El Khatib 7

Ota Gymnasium, Tokyo
Referees: Reza Javadi (IRI), Yuji Higashi (JPN), Huang Yi-chi (TPE)

September 17
11:30

Report

Macau	46–98	Philippines
Scoring by quarter: 14–33, 19–22, 8–28, 5–15
Pts: Lao F.I. 14; Rebs: Lo H.M. 12; Asts: Cai S.B., Cheong T.F. 2		Pts: Chan 18; Rebs: Reyes, Ganuelas 9 Asts: Ganuelas 9

Ota Gymnasium, Tokyo
Referees: Amir Hossein Safarzadeh (IRI), Yasser Abbas (QAT), Yoji Fujigaki (JPN)

September 17
14:00

Report

Uzbekistan	47–107	China
Scoring by quarter: 11–21, 8–31, 19–30, 9–25
Pts: Kozlov 11; Rebs: Rahimov 5 Asts: Rahimov 3		Pts: Zhao T.L. 20; Rebs: Yu C.D., Wang Z.L. 9 Asts: Wang Z.R. 8

Ota Gymnasium, Tokyo
Referees: Yuki Kubo (JPN), Reza Javadi (IRI), Rajnarayan Patro (IND)

September 18
11:30

Report

China	106–46	Macau
Scoring by quarter: 24–17, 23–13, 32–9, 27–7
Pts: Cao Y. 16; Rebs: Cao Y. 9 Asts: Wang Z.R. 8		Pts: Lao F.I. 12; Rebs: Iong K.K. 6 Asts: Lo H.M., Lai K.T. 3

Ota Gymnasium, Tokyo
Referees: Huang Yi-chi (TPE), Amir Hossein Safarzadeh (IRI), Yoji Higashi (JPN)

September 18
14:00

Report

Lebanon	84–49	Uzbekistan
Scoring by quarter: 24–9, 17–14, 25–15, 18–11
Pts: El Khatib 37; Rebs: El Khatib 11; Asts: Sarkis, El Khatib 5		Pts: Kozlov 15; Rebs: Juginisov 7 Asts: Kozlov, Denisov 4

Ota Gymnasium, Tokyo
Referees: Yoji Fujigaki (JPN), Yasser Abbas (QAT), Reza Javadi (IRI)

=== Group B ===
Team	Pld	W	L	PF	PA	PD	Pts
Iran	4	4	0	310	274	+36	8
Japan	4	3	1	318	290	+28	7
Chinese Taipei	4	2	2	329	322	+7	6
Qatar	4	1	3	301	296	+5	5
India	4	0	4	294	370	−76	4

September 14
14:00

Report

India	71–83	Iran
Scoring by quarter: 17–23, 20–17, 21–24, 13–19
Pts: Bhriguvanshi 21; Rebs: Pethani 9 Asts: Bhriguvanshi 6		Pts: Nikkhah 23; Rebs: Sahakian 11; Asts: Davoudi 4

Ota Gymnasium, Tokyo
Referees: Rabah Noujaim (LIB), Ferdinand Pascual (PHI), Yang Hongfeng (CHN)

September 14
19:00

Report

Japan	73–69	Qatar
Scoring by quarter: 24–15, 17–21, 20–14, 12–19
Pts: Takeuchi, Kanamaru 14; Rebs: Sakuragi 9 Asts: Sakurai 3		Pts: Ali 21; Rebs: Suliman 9 Asts: Abdulrahman, Suliman 2

Ota Gymnasium, Tokyo
Referees: Marwan Egho (LIB), Yevgeniy Mikheyev (KAZ), Wang Mei (CHN)

September 15
14:00

Report

Qatar	84–63	India
Scoring by quarter: 15–6, 16–19, 27–19, 26–19
Pts: Yousuf 13; Rebs: Abdelqader 11; Asts: El-Hadary 4		Pts: Grewal, Pethani 14; Rebs: Ar. Singh 12; Asts: Bhriguvanshi 5

Ota Gymnasium, Tokyo
Referees: Wang Mei (CHN), Rabah Noujaim (LIB), Ravshan Ganiev (UZB)

September 15
16:30

Report

Chinese Taipei	78–90	Japan
Scoring by quarter: 14–27, 20–26, 22–21, 22–16
Pts: Tien L. 19; Rebs: Tien L. 7 Asts: Lee H.L., Tseng W.T. 5		Pts: Sakuragi 19; Rebs: Sakuragi 10; Asts: Sakuragi, Watanabe 5

Ota Gymnasium, Tokyo
Referees: Marwan Egho (LIB), Ferdinand Pascual (PHI), Yevgeniy Mikheyev (KAZ)

September 16
11:30

Report

India	88–113	Chinese Taipei
Scoring by quarter: 24–31, 17–27, 17–33, 30–22
Pts: Bhriguvanshi 20; Rebs: Pethani 10; Asts: Bhriguvanshi 12		Pts: Chang T.H. 20; Rebs: Wu T.H., Creighton 6 Asts: Mao C.E., Tseng W.T. 4

Ota Gymnasium, Tokyo
Referees: Marwan Egho (LIB), Yang Hongfeng (CHN), Yevgeniy Mikheyev (KAZ)

September 16
19:00

Report

Iran	85–75 (OT)	Qatar
Scoring by quarter: 12–23, 14–22, 21–6, 22–18, Overtime: 16–6
Pts: Nikkhah 27; Rebs: Jamshidi, Nikkhah 8 Asts: Nikkhah 3		Pts: El-Hadary 21; Rebs: Ali 11; Asts: Ali 3

Ota Gymnasium, Tokyo
Referees: Ferdinand Pascual (PHI), Wang Mei (CHN), Rabah Noujaim (LIB)

September 17
16:30

Report

Japan	90–72	India
Scoring by quarter: 28–22, 16–19, 23–13, 23–18
Pts: Kanamaru 26; Rebs: Takeuchi 15; Asts: Sakuragi 4		Pts: Bhriguvanshi 21; Rebs: Ar. Singh 20; Asts: Bhriguvanshi 3

Ota Gymnasium, Tokyo
Referees: Yevgeniy Mikheyev (KAZ), Ravshan Ganiev (UZB), Yang Hongfeng (CHN)

September 17
19:00

Report

Chinese Taipei	63–71	Iran
Scoring by quarter: 20–17, 19–12, 12–27, 12–15
Pts: Tien L. 17; Rebs: Tseng W.T. 10; Asts: Lee H.L. 5		Pts: Nikkhah 24; Rebs: Sahakian 10; Asts: Afagh 3

Ota Gymnasium, Tokyo
Referees: Marwan Egho (LIB), Wang Mei (CHN), Ferdinand Pascual (PHI)

September 18
16:30

Report

Qatar	73–75	Chinese Taipei
Scoring by quarter: 22–17, 14–18, 15–18, 22–22
Pts: Ali 17; Rebs: Ahmad, Abdelqader 8 Asts: Yousuf 3		Pts: Tseng W.T. 17; Rebs: Tien L. 9 Asts: Chen S.C. 5

Ota Gymnasium, Tokyo
Referees: Rabah Noujaim (LIB), Yang Hongfeng (CHN), Ferdinand Pascual (PHI)

September 18
19:00

Report

Iran	71–65	Japan
Scoring by quarter: 13–17, 12–18, 21–16, 25–14
Pts: Nikkhah 16; Rebs: Sahakian 9 Asts: Davoudi 6		Pts: Sakurai 14; Rebs: Takeuchi 11; Asts: Sakuragi 5

Ota Gymnasium, Tokyo
Referees: Marwan Egho (LIB), Wang Mei (CHN), Yevgeniy Mikheyev (KAZ)

== Final round ==
Quarterfinals
September 20
Iran	79
Uzbekistan	37
September 20
Philippines	75
Chinese Taipei	68
September 20
Lebanon	72
Qatar	79
September 20
Japan	60
China	50

Semifinals
September 21
Iran	77
Philippines	60
September 21
Qatar	66
Japan	73

Final
September 22
Iran	53
Japan	51
3rd place
September 22
Philippines	63
Qatar	79

Semifinals
September 21
Uzbekistan	70
Chinese Taipei	86
September 21
Lebanon	63
China	78

5th place
September 22
Chinese Taipei	63
China	67
7th place
September 22
Uzbekistan	73
Lebanon	84

=== Quarterfinals ===
September 20
11:30

Report

Iran	79–37	Uzbekistan
Scoring by quarter: 17–13, 15–3, 27–9, 20–12
Pts: Kardoust 12; Rebs: Foroutan 10; Asts: Nikkhah 3		Pts: Denisov 9 Rebs: Yahin 9 Asts: Shatrov 6

Ota Gymnasium, Tokyo
Referees: Marwan Egho (LIB), Yasser Abbas (QAT), Yang Hongfeng (CHN)

September 20
14:00

Report

Philippines	75–68	Chinese Taipei
Scoring by quarter: 10–13, 28–19, 16–21, 21–15
Pts: Douthit 19; Rebs: Douthit 18; Asts: De Ocampo 3		Pts: Creighton 21; Rebs: Tseng W.T. 6 Asts: Lee H.L. 4

Ota Gymnasium, Tokyo
Referees: Rabah Noujaim (LIB), Yuki Kubo (JPN), Wang Mei (CHN)

September 20
16:30

Report

Lebanon	72–79	Qatar
Scoring by quarter: 15–21, 20–14, 20–24, 17–20
Pts: Thompson 26; Rebs: Thompson 16; Asts: El Khatib 5		Pts: Johnson 28; Rebs: Ali 8 Asts: Johnson 7

Ota Gymnasium, Tokyo
Referees: Yevgeniy Mikheyev (KAZ), Huang Yi-chi (TPE), Rajnarayan Patro (IND)

September 20
19:00

Report

Japan	60–50	China
Scoring by quarter: 15–16, 16–9, 13–12, 16–13
Pts: Takeuchi 18; Rebs: Takeuchi 10; Asts: Hinkley, Sakurai, Sakuragi 2		Pts: Wang Z.L. 15; Rebs: Wang Z.L. 14; Asts: Wang Z.L. 3

Ota Gymnasium, Tokyo
Referees: Ferdinand Pascual (PHI), Amir Hossein Safarzadeh (IRI), Huang Yi-chi (TPE)

=== Semifinals 5th–8th ===
September 21
11:30

Report

Uzbekistan	70–86	Chinese Taipei
Scoring by quarter: 18–30, 15–17, 20–19, 17–20
Pts: Kozlov 21; Rebs: Kozlov 9 Asts: Kozlov, Shatrov 3		Pts: Chen S.C. 13; Rebs: Lu C.J., Tien L. 5 Asts: Tseng W.T. 6

Ota Gymnasium, Tokyo
Referees: Ferdinand Pascual (PHI), Yoji Higashi (JPN), Amir Hossein Safarzadeh (IRI)

September 21
14:00

Report

Lebanon	63–78	China
Scoring by quarter: 11–23, 20–22, 20–20, 12–13
Pts: El Khatib 34; Rebs: El Khatib 9 Asts: Akl, Thompson, El Khatib 2		Pts: Zhao T.L. 27; Rebs: Yu C.D., Wang Z.L. 9 Asts: Guo A.L. 4

Ota Gymnasium, Tokyo
Referees: Reza Javadi (IRI), Yoji Fujigaki (JPN), Yasser Abbas (QAT)

=== Semifinals ===
September 21
16:30

Report

Iran	77–60	Philippines
Scoring by quarter: 16–17, 14–13, 23–17, 24–13
Pts: Afagh 14; Rebs: Sahakian 8 Asts: Davoudi, Sahakian 5		Pts: Tenorio, Dillinger 13; Rebs: Douthit 7 Asts: Tenorio, Chan, Fonacier 3

Ota Gymnasium, Tokyo
Referees: Marwan Egho (LIB), Yevgeniy Mikheyev (KAZ), Wang Mei (CHN)

September 21
19:00

Report

Qatar	66–73	Japan
Scoring by quarter: 12–9, 7–21, 20–21, 25–22
Pts: Yousuf 22; Rebs: Ali 13; Asts: Johnson 6		Pts: Takeuchi 18; Rebs: Takeuchi, Sakuragi 9 Asts: Sakurai, Sakuragi 4

Ota Gymnasium, Tokyo
Referees: Rabah Noujaim (LIB), Rajnarayan Patro (IND), Huang Yi-chi (TPE)

=== 7th place ===
September 22
9:00

Report

Uzbekistan	73–84	Lebanon
Scoring by quarter: 15–28, 16–21, 17–18, 25–17
Pts: Kozlov 24; Rebs: Juginisov, Yahin, Kadirov 5 Asts: Kozlov 4		Pts: El Khatib 44; Rebs: Hawe 9 Asts: El Khatib 6

Ota Gymnasium, Tokyo
Referees: Yang Hongfeng (CHN), Reza Javadi (IRI), Rajnarayan Patro (IND)

=== 5th place ===
September 22
11:30

Report

Chinese Taipei	63–67	China
Scoring by quarter: 16–18, 8–11, 23–20, 16–18
Pts: Lin C.C. 20; Rebs: Tseng W.T. 7 Asts: Lee H.L. 5		Pts: Wang Z.L. 20; Rebs: Wang Z.L. 14; Asts: Wang Z.L. 4

Ota Gymnasium, Tokyo
Referees: Rabah Noujaim (LIB), Yasser Abbas(QAT), Yuji Higashi (JPN)

=== 3rd place ===
September 22
14:00

Report

Philippines	63–79	Qatar
Scoring by quarter: 8–12, 18–23, 22–20, 15–24
Pts: Douthit 17; Rebs: Douthit 10; Asts: de Ocampo, Fonacier 2		Pts: Yousuf 17; Rebs: Suliman, Ali 11; Asts: El-Hadary, Johnson 4

Ota Gymnasium, Tokyo
Referees: Yoji Fujigaki (JPN), Wang Mei (CHN), Amir Hossein Safarzadeh (IRI)

=== Final ===
September 22
16:30

Report

Iran	53–51	Japan
Scoring by quarter: 13–11, 17–12, 10–21, 13–7
Pts: Nikkhah 14; Rebs: Sahakian 10; Asts: Davoudi, Sahakian, Nikkhah 2		Pts: Kanamaru 16; Rebs: Takeuchi 13; Asts: Sakurai 5

Ota Gymnasium, Tokyo
Referees: Marwan Egho (LIB), Yevgeniy Mikheyev (KAZ), Ferdinand Pascal (PHI)

== Final standing ==
Qualified for the 2013 FIBA Asia Championship

Rank	Team	Record
1st place, gold medalist(s)	Iran	7–0
2nd place, silver medalist(s)	Japan	5–2
3rd place, bronze medalist(s)	Qatar	3–4
4	Philippines	4–3
5	China	5–2
6	Chinese Taipei	3–4
7	Lebanon	4–3
8	Uzbekistan	1–6
9	India	0–4
9	Macau	0–4

== Awards ==
2012 FIBA Asia Cup champions

Iran
First title

- Most Valuable Player: (Iran) Samad Nikkhah Bahrami

All-Star Team:

- PG – (Japan) Ryota Sakurai
- SG – (Iran) Hamed Afagh
- SF – (Iran) Samad Nikkhah Bahrami
- PF – (Japan) Kosuke Takeuchi
- C – (Iran) Asghar Kardoust
