= Harbhajan =

Harbhajan can refer to:

- Harbhajan Singh E.T.O. Punjabi politician from Jandiala
- Harbhajan Mann, a Punjabi singer and actor
- Harbhajan Rai, a former field hockey player from Canada
- Baba Harbhajan Singh, an Indian army soldier who died near the Nathula Pass in eastern Sikkim, India
- Harbhajan Lakha, Indian politician.
- Harbhajan Singh (poet), a Punjabi poet, critic, cultural commentator, and translator
- Harbhajan Singh, an Indian cricketer
- Harbhajan Singh (basketball) (born 1950), Indian Olympic basketball player
- Harbhajan Singh (mountaineer) Mountaineer
- Harbhajan Singh Yogi, a master of Kundalini Yoga and spiritual leader for the 3HO movement
