= C. V. Sunny =

Former Indian basketball team captain

Cheruthottil Varghese Sunny (born 21 May 1967) is a former Indian basketball player from Kerala. He played for the India men's national basketball team as a point guard. He captained the Indian team and also played for Indian Bank and Kerala in the domestic tournaments.

== Early life and education ==
Sunny was born in Pala, Kottayam district into a middle-class family. He has five siblings, two elder sisters, two younger sisters and one younger brother. He started with badminton and football in school but soon took up basketball after watching his seniors practise. He did his schooling at St. Thomas High School, Pala and his physical director VC Joseph was his first coach. He was employed at Indian Bank, Chennai.

== Playing career ==
Sunny was the captain of the Kerala state team which won the gold in the Junior National Championship in 1986. Based on his performance, he was called for the senior Indian camp after the Junior Nationals. He made his senior India debut in 1986. He was part of the Indian team that won the gold medal at the South Asian Games in 1991 at Colombo, Sri Lanka, and then he captained the Indian team at home, to a gold at the SAF games, Chennai in 1995 and retired from international career. He played the domestic events till 2008. Along with C Jayashankar Menon, he helped Indian Bank win five Federation Cup titles in 1990s.

== Coaching career ==
Sunny started his coaching career taking up small assignments with Loyola College, Chennai and Hindustan College of Engineering. Later, he coached the Jeppiaar Institute of Technology basketball team which became the top team in South India from 2009 to 2011. He is a FIBA level 3 coach. In 2014, he started a basketball academy and conducts regular coaching camps and clinics. In 2017, he was briefly the head coach of the Indian team. In 2015, he coached the Tamil Nadu men's senior basketball team that won the silver medal at the National Games in Kannur. In 2024, he was also the head coach for Tamil Nadu in the FIBA West Asia Super League at Qatar. He coached the men's Tamil Nadu team that won the silver at the 2025 National Games and gold at the 74th National basketball championship.

=== Awards ===
- Sunny received the G. V. Raja award in 1996.
