= Paramjit Singh (basketball) =

Indian basketball player (1952–2024)

Paramjit Singh (30 December 1952 – 22 February 2024) was an Indian basketball player who competed in the 1980 Olympics. He was also the captain of the Indian basketball team at the Olympics. Singh died on 22 February 2024, at the age of 71.
