= Veselin Matić =

Serbian basketball coach

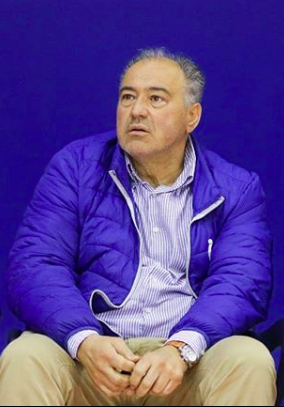
- Matic courtside at OKK Beograd's basketball game

Personal information
- Born: July 21, 1960 (age 66) Belgrade, PR Serbia, FPR Yugoslavia
- Listed height: 1.84 m (6 ft 0 in)
- Coaching career: 1988–present

Career history

Playing
- 1980–1988: OKK Beograd

Coaching
- 1988–1990: OKK Beograd
- 1989–1990: SFR Yugoslavia (assistant)
- 1990–1993: BG Karlsruhe
- 1993–1994: Crvena zvezda (assistant)
- 1994: KK Crvena zvezda
- 1994–1996: Partizan (assistant)
- 1997–1998: USC Freiburg
- 1998: FR Yugoslavia (scout)
- 1998–2000: Polonia Warszawa
- 2000–2001: Köln 99ers
- 2000–2002: FR Yugoslavia (assistant)
- 2004–2006: Poland
- 2006–2008: BC Kalev
- 2008–2009: Sagesse
- 2009–2011: Iran
- 2012–2014: Al Ahly
- 2013: Libya
- 2015–2016: Lebanon
- 2017–2019: Syria
- 2019–2024: India

Career highlights
- As a head coach: Arab Club Championship winner: 1 (with Al-Ahli Benghazi 2012-13); Estonian Cup winner: 2 (with Kalev/Cramo: 2006–07, 2007–08); As assistant coach: FR Yugoslav League champion: 3 (with Crvena zvezda: 1993–94; with Partizan: 1994–95, 1995–96); Yugoslav Cup winner: 1 (with Partizan: 1994–95); Individual: Estonian League Coach of the Year: 2007
Medals
Men's basketball
Head coach for India
SABA Championship
Gold medal – first place	SABA Championship	Team
South Asian Games
Gold medal – first place	2019 Nepal	Team
Head coach for Lebanon
West Asian Championship
Gold medal – first place	2015 Anman	Team
Head coach for Iran
William Jones Cup
Gold medal – first place	2011 William Jones	Team
West Asian Championship
Gold medal – first place	2010 Duhok	Team
William Jones Cup
Gold medal – first place	2010 William Jones	Team
Asian Games
Bronze medal – third place	2010 Guangzhou	Team
William Jones Cup
Gold medal – first place	2009 William Jones	Team
Asia Cup
Gold medal – first place	2009 China	Team
Assistant coach for FR Yugoslavia
World Championship
Gold medal – first place	2002 Indianapolis	Team
European Championship
Gold medal – first place	2001 Turkey	Team
Scout for FR Yugoslavia
World Championship
Gold medal – first place	1998 Athens	Team
Head coach for FR Yugoslavia
European Championship for Cadets
Gold medal – first place	1997 Belgium	U16 Team

Veselin Matić (Serbian Cyrillic: Веселин Матић; born July 21, 1960) also known by his nickname Toza, is a Serbian professional basketball coach, who last served as the head coach of India men's national basketball team.

== Personal life ==
His son, Andrija Matić, is also a basketball player, who played for American University from 2015–2017 and for Keiser University from 2017–2019.

== Coaching career ==
=== Coaching clinics and camps ===
When he was younger he worked in the Adidas Eurocamp (1996–99), but has been part of FIBA's YUBAC, where he has been the Camp head coach since 2004. At YUBAC he has helped out in multiple Areas including Pro Camp, Shooting Camp and Basic Camp.

=== National team highlights ===
- (Serbia and Montenegro) World Champion (1998, Scout)
- (Serbia and Montenegro) European Champion (2001, Assistant)
- (Serbia and Montenegro) World Champion (2002, Assistant)

== See also ==
- List of Red Star Belgrade basketball coaches
