= Arvinder Singh Kahlon =

Indian basketball player

Personal information
- Born: 2 December 2002 (age 23) Barnala, Punjab, India
- Position: Power forward
- Number: 24

Arvinder Singh Kahlon (born 2 December 2002) is an Indian basketball player from Punjab. He plays for the India men's national basketball team as a power forward. He plays for Railways in the domestic tournaments.

== Early life ==
He is born in Barnala, Punjab on 12 March 2002. His father is an assistant sub-inspector in Punjab Police. He started with athletics as a shot putter and at 13 shifted to basketball after he was spotted by Rajinder Singh of Ludhiana Basketball Academy, who persuaded his father to send his ward to basketball. Within a year Singh joined the NBA academy Greater Noida.

== Career ==
In 2024, he was part of the Indian team that defeated Kazakhstan in the FIBA Asia Cup. In March 2025, he played 4 matches in the FIBA Asia Cup qualifiers at Manama, and in the crucial match where India defeated higher ranked Bahrain. He went on to play the FIBA Asia Cup in August 2025. In 2025, he played for the Yamaguchi Patsfive in the Japanese B3 League.

He participated in the 2019 Basketball Without Borders Asia Camp in Tokyo.

He was part of the Indian Railways team that won the Senior Nationals at Ludhiana in 2025.
