= Amaan Sandhu =

Indian basketball player

Punjab
- Position: Centre

Personal information
- Born: 8 December 2002 (age 23) Punjab, India

Career information
- College: Monmouth University (2023)
- Playing career: 2021–present

Career history
- 2021–: India
- First Love Christian Academy (G League)

Amaan Sandhu (born 8 December 2002) is an Indian basketball player from Punjab. He plays for the India men's national basketball team as a Centre. He plays for Punjab in the domestic tournaments.

== Career ==
In 2021, he first played for the Senior India team in the FIBA Asia Cup 2021 Qualifiers. In 2023, he was part of the India team that played in the FIBA Olympic Pre-Qualifying Tournament at Syria. In August 2025, he played FIBA Asia Cup.

He played for the First Love Christian Academy in the G League, the development league of NBA. In 2023, he also played for Monmouth University in Division 1 of the NCAA, the highest level of collegiate basketball in the USA.
