= FIBA Asia Challenge =

International basketball tournament

- Most recent season or competition: 2016 FIBA Asia Challenge
- Sport: Basketball
- Founded: 2004
- First season: 2004
- No. of teams: 10
- Country: FIBA Asia member nations
- Continent: FIBA Asia (Asia)
- Most recent champion: Iran (3rd title)
- Most titles: Iran (3 titles)
- Website: FIBA Asia

The FIBA Asia Challenge, previously known as the FIBA Asia Stanković Cup between 2004 and 2010 and FIBA Asia Cup from 2012 to 2014, was an international basketball tournament that took place every two years between national teams from Asia.

== History ==
The second tournament was supposed to be held in Damascus, Syria in 2006, but got cancelled due to political situation.

The champion is given an automatic berth to the following year's FIBA Asia Championship, while the next top three finishers would all receive additional berths for their FIBA Asia subzones.

During the FIBA Asia Central Board meeting last January 30–31, 2016, it was decided that this year's edition is the first step in the process of identifying the qualifiers for the 2017 FIBA Asia Cup (supposed to be the new name of the Asian Championship), the first-ever Continental Cup played jointly by teams from Asia and Oceania, thus renaming this tournament as FIBA Asia Challenge.

== Summary ==
Year	Host	Final			Third-place game		
Year	Host	Champions	Score	Runners-up	Third place	Score	Fourth place
2004; Details	(Taiwan); Taipei	Qatar	82–65	South Korea	Chinese Taipei	82–60	Syria
2008; Details	Kuwait City	Jordan	No playoffs	Kazakhstan	Kuwait	No playoffs	Qatar
2010; Details	(Lebanon); Beirut	Lebanon	97–59	Japan	Qatar	80–75	Philippines
2012; Details	(Japan); Tokyo	Iran	53–51	Japan	Qatar	79–63	Philippines
2014; Details	(China); Wuhan	Iran	89–79	Chinese Taipei	Philippines	80–79	China
2016; Details	(Iran); Tehran	Iran	77–47	South Korea	Jordan	94–72	Iraq

== Medal table ==
Rank	Nation	Gold	Silver	Bronze	Total
1	Iran	3	0	0	3
2	Qatar	1	0	2	3
3	Jordan	1	0	1	2
4	Lebanon	1	0	0	1
5	Japan	0	2	0	2
5	South Korea	0	2	0	2
7	Chinese Taipei	0	1	1	2
8	Kazakhstan	0	1	0	1
9	Kuwait	0	0	1	1
9	Philippines	0	0	1	1
Totals (10 entries)		6	6	6	18

== Participating nations ==
Nation	(Taiwan) 2004	(Kuwait) 2008	(Lebanon) 2010	(Japan) 2012	(China) 2014	(Iran) 2016	Years
China				5th	4th	5th	3
Chinese Taipei	3rd		7th	6th	2nd	8th	5
India	6th	5th		9th	7th	7th	5
Indonesia					9th		1
Iran			6th	1st	1st	1st	4
Iraq			9th			4th	2
Japan	5th		2nd	2nd	6th	6th	5
Jordan		1st	5th		5th	3rd	4
Kazakhstan		2nd	8th			11th	3
Kuwait	7th	3rd					2
Lebanon			1st	7th			2
Macau				9th			1
Philippines	8th		4th	4th	3rd	9th	5
Qatar	1st	4th	3rd	3rd		10th	5
Singapore					8th		1
South Korea	2nd					2nd	2
Syria	4th		10th				2
Thailand						12th	1
Uzbekistan				8th			1
Total	8	5	10	10	9	12	

== See also ==
- FIBA Asia Championship
