= G. V. Raja Award =

G.V. Raja Award was instituted by Government of Kerala in 2018 for sports persons from Kerala. It is the highest honor of the state in sports and it is coordinated by Kerala State Sports Council every year. The award was instituted in the memory of G. V. Raja, the founding president of Kerala State Sports Council with a cash prize of 3 Lakh rupees, plaque and certificate.
