= Sat Prakash Yadav =

Indian basketball player

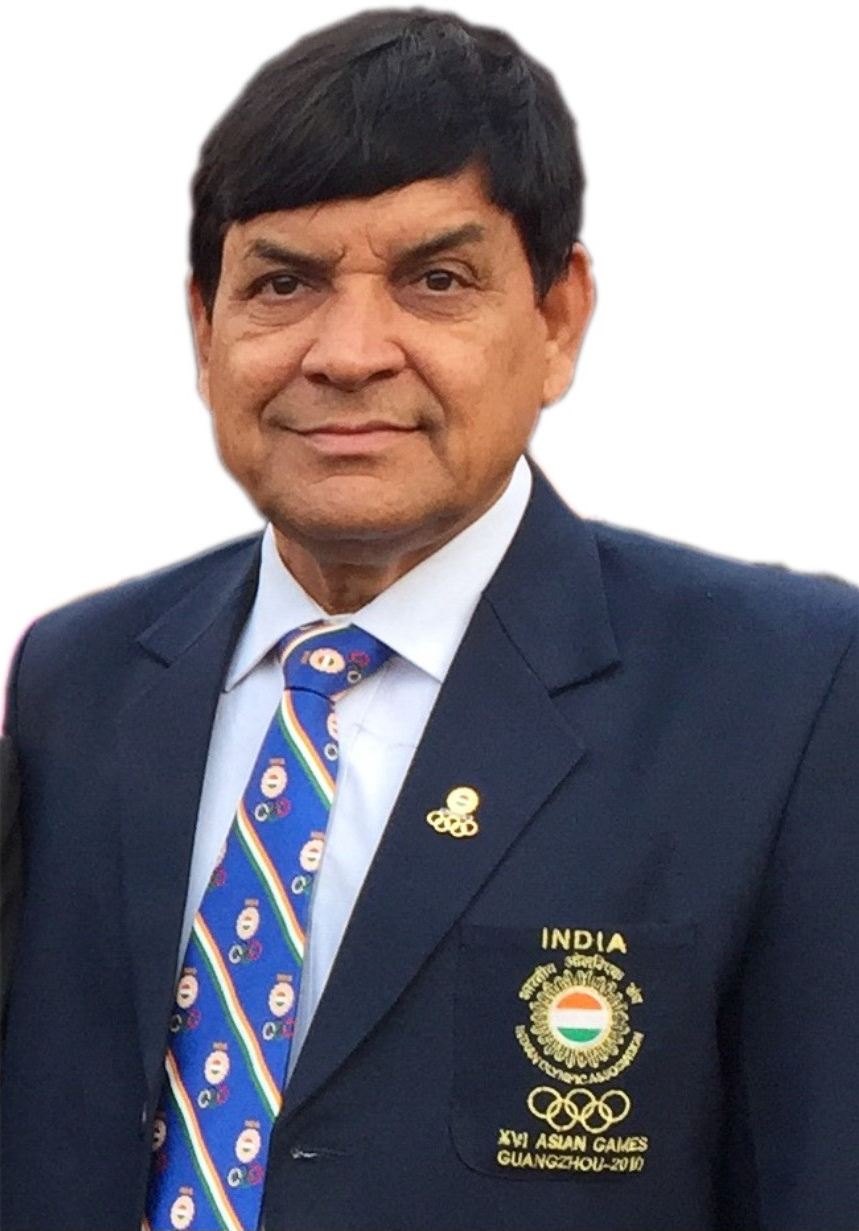
- Sat Prakash Yadav

No. 12 – India
- Position: Guard
- League: Asian Basketball Confederation

Personal information
- Born: April 2, 1955 (age 71) Hisar, Haryana
- Listed height: 6 ft 2 in (1.88 m)

Sat Prakash Yadav (born 2 April 1955) is a former head coach of the India national basketball team and was formerly the captain of the Indian men's team. He played continuously on the Indian national team from 1981 to 1990 and in the Senior National Basketball Championships for 23 years from 1973 to 1995. He was appointed coach of the national men's team in 2017.

== Awards and recognition ==
- Awarded with the Sports Ambassador Award by then US President Ronald Reagan.
- Awarded with Rajasthan's Maharana Pratap Award in 1987 for outstanding performance in the field of Basketball sport at the National and International levels for a long span of time.
- Awarded with the Railway Minister's National Award for the year 1989 for outstanding performance at National and International level in Basketball.
- FIBA WABC License Holder (Licence number: 2007019309)

== List of events ==
- Represented India in the Asian Basketball Confederation Championship 1981 held at Calcutta.
- Represented India in the IX Asian Games held at Delhi in 1982.
- Represented India in an International Invitational Basketball Championship 1982 held at Seoul, South Korea.
- Represented India in the Asian Basketball Confederation Championship 1983 held at Hong Kong.
- Represented India in the 3rd Crown Prince's Cup International Invitational Basketball Championship 1983 held at Bangkok, Thailand and won the silver medal.
- Represented India in the Eight Test Matches series in 1983 against visiting Athletes in Action (USA) Basketball Team and won the series.
- Captain of the Indian team in the Benson and Hedges Cup International Invitational Basketball Tournament 1984 held at Kuala Lumpur, Malaysia.
- Captain of the Indian team in the Merlion Cup International Invitational Basketball Championship 1984 held at Singapore.
- Represented India in the Eight Test Match series against visiting Massachusetts Institute of Technology (USA) Basketball Team in 1984 in India and won the series.
- Represented India in the Asian Basketball Confederation Championship 1985 held at Kuala Lumpur.
- Represented India in the Six Test Match series in 1985 against the visiting USSR Basketball Team.
- Represented India in the Six Test Match series in 1986 against the visiting Yugoslavian Basketball Team.
- Represented India in the Asian Basketball Confederation Championship 1987 held at Bangkok.
- Represented India in the 3rd SAF Games 1987 held at Calcutta and won the gold medal
- Represented India in V Crown Prince's Cup Basketball Championship 1987 held at Bangkok.
- Captain of Indian Railways Team in the World Railway Games held at Delhi in 1987 and won the bronze medal.
- Represented India in the International Invitational Basketball Tour to Syria 1988.
- Represented India in the International Invitational Basketball Tournament held at Mashhad, Iran 1989.
- Represented Indian Railways in the World Railway Games held at Romania in 1990 and won the bronze medal.

== List of coaching achievements ==
- Appointed as Head Coach of Senior Indian Basketball Men's Team for FIBA Asia Challenge Cup 2016—The team qualified and secured seventh place after 27 years.
- Appointed as Head Coach of Senior Indian Basketball Men's Team for 28th FIBA Asia Basketball Championship 2015—the team qualified and played Quarterfinals after 12 Years
- Appointed as Head Coach of Senior Indian Basketball Women's Team for 16th Asian Games 2010—the team qualified and secured sixth place.
- Appointed as Head Coach of Indian Basketball Women's Team for the 22nd FIBA Asia Basketball Championship 2007 (won all the matches played) -- The team qualified First Time for Level-I by winning all the matches.
