= 2014 FIBA Asia Cup =

5th Asia Cup
- Official logo of the 2014 FIBA Asia Cup

Tournament details
- Host country: China
- Dates: 11–19 July
- Teams: 10 (from 1 federation)
- Venue: 1 (in 1 host city)

Final positions
- Champions: Iran (2nd title)

Tournament statistics
- MVP: (Iran) Hamed Haddadi
- Top scorer: (Singapore) Wong (Chinese Taipei) Liu (15.5)
- Top rebounds: (Philippines) Douthit (11.7)
- Top assists: (India) Bhriguvanshi (4.1)
- PPG (Team): Chinese Taipei (79)
- RPG (Team): China (46.6)
- APG (Team): Japan (15.3)

Official website
- 2014 FIBA Asia Cup

2014 FIBA Asia Cup was the 5th FIBA Asia Cup, a top-level international basketball tournament of FIBA Asia. The tournament was held in Wuhan, Hubei, China from 11–19 July 2014. Iran won the tournament by defeating Chinese Taipei 89–79 in the final and thus automatically qualified for the 2015 FIBA Asia Championship to be held in China.

== Qualification ==
According to the FIBA Asia rules, the number of participating teams in the 2014 FIBA Asia Cup is ten (10). Each zone had one place, and the hosts (China) and the defending FIBA Asia Championship titleholder (Iran) were automatically qualified. The other two places were allocated to the zones according to performance in the 2013 FIBA Asia Championship; as a result, Southeast Asia and East Asia zones were allocated an additional berth each.

In the event of a withdrawal or non-participation by qualified teams, FIBA Asia has the right to invite other teams, while endeavoring to maintain, as far as possible, a certain balance between Sub-Zones.

Included are teams' FIBA World Ranking prior to the tournament.

Central Asia (1)	East Asia (1+1+1)	Gulf (1)	South Asia (1)	Southeast Asia (1+1)	West Asia (1+1)
Uzbekistan (71)	China (12)	None	India (61)	Singapore (Unranked)	Iran (20)
	Chinese Taipei (44)			Indonesia (68)	Jordan (30)
	Japan (35)				

Notes:

- Philippines (ranked 34th) selected as a wild card for replacement of a team from the Gulf sub-zone.
- Uzbekistan (ranked 71st) withdrew, leaving four teams in Group B. They were not replaced.

== Draw ==
The draw was held on June 8, 2014 at Wuhan Sports Center in Wuhan, Hubei, China.

== Preliminary round ==
Key to colours in group tables
Top four placed teams advanced to the quarter-finals

=== Group A ===
Team	Pld	W	L	PF	PA	PD	Pts	Tie
China	4	3	1	306	219	+87	7	1–0
Iran	4	3	1	256	216	+40	7	0–1
Japan	4	2	2	296	259	+37	6	1–0
India	4	2	2	257	250	+7	6	0–1
Indonesia	4	0	4	198	367	−169	4	

July 11
17:15

Report

Japan	56–66	Iran
Scoring by quarter: 17–15, 16–15, 7–15, 16–21
Pts: Takeuchi J. 10; Rebs: Takeuchi K. 9 Asts: Tanaka, Ono, Kikuchi 2		Pts: Yakhchali 13; Rebs: Haddadi 11; Asts: Haddadi 3

Wuhan Sports Center Gymnasium, Wuhan
Referees: Marwan Egho (LIB), Ferdinand Pascual (PHI), Arsen Andryushkin (KAZ)

July 11
19:30

Report

China	105–37	Indonesia
Scoring by quarter: 34–1, 16–17, 27–6, 28–13
Pts: Gu, Gao 16; Rebs: Zhang 11; Asts: Wang 4		Pts: Regowo, Damanik 6 Rebs: Enguio 5 Asts: Prastawa 2

Wuhan Sports Center Gymnasium, Wuhan
Referees: Naser Mohammad Ramadan Abu Rashed (JOR), Ricor Buaron (PHI), Victor Min De Mah (SIN)

July 12
17:15

Report

India	52–75	Japan
Scoring by quarter: 13–15, 11–23, 10–22, 18–15
Pts: Singh Amr. 15; Rebs: Singh Amr., Singh, Amj. 8 Asts: Bhriguvanshi 2		Pts: Takeuchi J. 13; Rebs: Takeuchi J. 9 Asts: Ishizaki, Tanaka, Shonaka 3

Wuhan Sports Center Gymnasium, Wuhan
Referees: Ricor Buaron (PHI), Ying-Cheng Chen (TPE), Victor Min De Mah (SIN)

July 12
19:30

Report

Iran	51–64	China
Scoring by quarter: 14–14, 16–13, 12–12, 9–25
Pts: Haddadi 15; Rebs: Haddadi 9 Asts: Veisi 4		Pts: Gao 13; Rebs: Dong H.L. 11; Asts: Zhao J.W. 3

Wuhan Sports Center Gymnasium, Wuhan
Referees: Ferdinand Pascual (PHI), Naser Mohammad Ramadan Abu Rashed (JOR), Arsen Andryushkin (KAZ)

July 13
17:15

Report

Indonesia	47–77	Iran
Scoring by quarter: 13–27, 20–9, 5–24, 9–17
Pts: Enguio 16; Rebs: Regowo 8 Asts: 6 players 1		Pts: Kardoust 18; Rebs: Kazemi 13; Asts: Veisi, Zangeneh 3

Wuhan Sports Center Gymnasium, Wuhan
Referees: Arsen Andryushkin (KAZ), Ricor Buaron (PHI), Ying-Cheng Chen (TPE)

July 13
19:30

Report

China	58–65	India
Scoring by quarter: 11–24, 20–9, 19–15, 8–17
Pts: Gao 12; Rebs: Kelanbaike 9 Asts: Zhao J.W. 3		Pts: Singh P., Singh Amj. 13; Rebs: Bhriguvanshi 7 Asts: Bhriguvanshi 7

Wuhan Sports Center Gymnasium, Wuhan
Referees: Marwan Egho (LIB), Victor Min De Mah (SIN), Ferdinand Pascual (PHI)

July 14
17:15

Report

India	91–55	Indonesia
Scoring by quarter: 28–13, 21–7, 18–15, 24–20
Pts: Bhriguvanshi 16; Rebs: Brar 8 Asts: Bhriguvanshi 5		Pts: Ramadhani 16; Rebs: Ramadhani 7 Asts: Ramadhani 3

Wuhan Sports Center Gymnasium, Wuhan
Referees: Ricor Buaron (PHI), Naser Mohammad Ramadan Abu Rashed (JOR), Ying-Cheng Chen (TPE)

July 14
19:30

Report

Japan	66–79	China
Scoring by quarter: 18–14, 24–19, 10–25, 14–21
Pts: Takeuchi, K. 14; Rebs: Takeuchi, J. 7 Asts: Ishizaki 5		Pts: Zhou 16; Rebs: Zhou 11; Asts: Tao 3

Wuhan Sports Center Gymnasium, Wuhan
Referees: Marwan Egho (LIB), Arsen Andryushkin (KAZ), Ferdinand Pascual (PHI)

July 15
12:30

Report

Iran	62–49	India
Scoring by quarter: 13–20, 13–9, 22–7, 14–13
Pts: Haddadi 16; Rebs: Haddadi 9 Asts: Haddadi 4		Pts: Singh Amj. 17; Rebs: Singh Amj. 5 Asts: Singh Amj. 4

Wuhan Sports Center Gymnasium, Wuhan
Referees: Ferdinand Pascual (PHI), Naser Mohammad Ramadan Abu Rashed (JOR), Victor Min De Mah (SIN)

July 15
14:45

Report

Indonesia	59–96	Japan
Scoring by quarter: 11–25, 13–31, 15–24, 20–16
Pts: Prawiro 13; Rebs: Irman 7 Asts: Prastawa 3		Pts: Harimoto 15; Rebs: Tanaka 9 Asts: Tanaka 5

Wuhan Sports Center Gymnasium, Wuhan
Referees: Arsen Andryushkin (KAZ), Ricor Buaron (PHI), Ying-Cheng Chen (TPE)

=== Group B ===
Team	Pld	W	L	PF	PA	PD	Pts
Philippines	3	3	0	223	191	+32	6
Chinese Taipei	3	2	1	235	206	+29	5
Jordan	3	1	2	203	209	−6	4
Singapore	3	0	3	175	230	−55	3

July 11
14:45

Report

Chinese Taipei	85–63	Jordan
Scoring by quarter: 19–20, 24–14, 22–18, 20–11
Pts: Davis 21; Rebs: Davis 17; Asts: Liu 5		Pts: Wright 21; Rebs: Abuqoura 7 Asts: Abdeen 3

Wuhan Sports Center Gymnasium, Wuhan
Referees: Amirhossein Safarzadeh (IRI), Snehal Bendke (IND), Naohiko Uchihara (JPN)

July 12
14:45

Report

Philippines	78–64	Chinese Taipei
Scoring by quarter: 20–10, 16–16, 11–24, 31–14
Pts: Lee 18; Rebs: Douthit 16; Asts: Lee, Tenorio 4		Pts: Hu L.M. 15; Rebs: Davis 9 Asts: Peng C.Y. 8

Wuhan Sports Center Gymnasium, Wuhan
Referees: Marwan Egho (LIB), Haryanto Sutaryo (INA), Ceciline Michael Vino (IND)

July 13
14:45

Report

Singapore	53–70	Jordan
Scoring by quarter: 15–15, 11–18, 17–23, 10–14
Pts: Wong 33; Rebs: Goh 11; Asts: Ng 2		Pts: Wright 14; Rebs: Al Hamarsheh 10; Asts: Eid, Al-Sous 3

Wuhan Sports Center Gymnasium, Wuhan
Referees: Snehal Bendke (IND), Haryanto Sutaryo (INA), Mei Wang (CHN)

July 14
14:45

Report

Philippines	74–57	Singapore
Scoring by quarter: 25–14, 18–17, 13–8, 18–18
Pts: David, Lee 10; Rebs: Belga 7 Asts: Alas, Lee 3		Pts: Ng H.B. 17; Rebs: Lim, Ng H.B. 8 Asts: 5 players 1

Wuhan Sports Center Gymnasium, Wuhan
Referees: Zhu Duan (CHN), Amirhossein Safarzadeh (IRI), Ceciline Michael Vino (IND)

July 15
17:15

Report

Jordan	70–71	Philippines
Scoring by quarter: 12–17, 18–13, 22–19, 18–22
Pts: Al-Sous 14; Rebs: Al-Dwairi 14; Asts: Al Hamarsheh, Eid 3		Pts: Lee 16; Rebs: Douthit 9 Asts: de Ocampo 2

Wuhan Sports Center Gymnasium, Wuhan
Referees: Marwan Egho (LIB), Snehal Bendke (IND), Mei Wang (CHN)

July 15
19:30

Report

Singapore	65–86	Chinese Taipei
Scoring by quarter: 11–28, 20–16, 13–24, 21–18
Pts: Wong 17; Rebs: Goh 11; Asts: Ng H.B. 3		Pts: Chang 20; Rebs: Lu 6 Asts: Chen Y. 5

Wuhan Sports Center Gymnasium, Wuhan
Referees: Naohiko Uchihara (JPN), Zhu Duan (CHN), Ceciline Michael Vino (IND)

== Final round ==
The teams in this round will be the Top 4 teams per group

5th place game (July 19)
A3	Japan	72
B3	Jordan	79
7th place game (July 19)
A4	Singapore	36
B4	India	85

5th-8th place semifinals (July 18)
B4	Singapore	48
A3	Japan	82
A4	India	65
B3	Jordan	69

Quarterfinals (July 17)
A1	China	84
B4	Singapore	37
B2	Chinese Taipei	76
A3	Japan	62
B1	Philippines	70
A4	India	66
A2	Iran	75
B3	Jordan	60

Semifinals (July 18)
A1	China	73
B2	Chinese Taipei	84
B1	Philippines	55
A2	Iran	76

Final (July 19)
B2	Chinese Taipei	79
A2	Iran	89
Bronze medal game (July 19)
A1	China	79
B1	Philippines	80

=== Quarterfinals ===
July 17
12:30

Report

Chinese Taipei	76–62	Japan
Scoring by quarter: 20–20, 21–9, 10–20, 25–13
Pts: Liu 22; Rebs: Davis 20; Asts: Davis, Liu 3		Pts: Tanaka 14; Rebs: Takeuchi K., Hiejima 6 Asts: Ishizaki, Hiejima, Tanaka, Takeuchi J. 2

Wuhan Sports Center Gymnasium, Wuhan
Referees: Snehal Bendke (IND), Victor Min De Mah (SIN), Ferdinand Pascual (PHI)

July 17
14:45

Report

Iran	75–60	Jordan
Scoring by quarter: 21–12, 12–10, 18–16, 24–22
Pts: Jamshidi 26; Rebs: Haddadi 10; Asts: Jamshidi 4		Pts: Wright, Al-Dwairi 14; Rebs: Al-Dwairi 8 Asts: Al-Sous 4

Wuhan Sports Center Gymnasium, Wuhan
Referees: Marwan Egho (LIB), Naohiko Uchihara (JPN), Mei Wang (CHN)

July 17
17:15

Report

Philippines	70–66	India
Scoring by quarter: 20–17, 25–16, 15–14, 10–19
Pts: Lee 15; Rebs: Douthit 12; Asts: Lee 3		Pts: Singh Amr. 20; Rebs: Singh Amr., Singh Amj. 10; Asts: Singh P. 4

Wuhan Sports Center Gymnasium, Wuhan
Referees: Arsen Andryushkin (KAZ), Ying-Cheng Chen (TPE), Zhu Duan (CHN)

July 17
19:30

Report

China	84–37	Singapore
Scoring by quarter: 18–10, 20–4, 26–7, 20–16
Pts: Gu 15; Rebs: Tao 10; Asts: Wang 8		Pts: Wong 10; Rebs: Goh 8 Asts: Oh 3

Wuhan Sports Center Gymnasium, Wuhan
Referees: Naser Mohammad Ramadan Abu Rashed (JOR), Ricor Buaron (PHI), Haryanto Sutaryo (INA)

=== Semifinals 5th–8th ===
July 18
12:30

Report

India	65–69	Jordan
Scoring by quarter: 17–11, 10–10, 20–26, 18–22
Pts: Bhriguvanshi 17; Rebs: Bhriguvanshi, Singh 6 Asts: Bhriguvanshi 4		Pts: Al-Dwairi 21; Rebs: Al-Dwairi 10; Asts: Al-Sous 5

Wuhan Sports Center Gymnasium, Wuhan

July 18
14:45

Report

Japan	82–48	Singapore
Scoring by quarter: 18–11, 20–14, 25–12, 19–11
Pts: 3 tied at 11; Rebs: Takeuchi 11; Asts: 3 tied at 3		Pts: Wong 12; Rebs: Goh 7 Asts: Oh 2

Wuhan Sports Center Gymnasium, Wuhan

=== Semifinals ===
July 18
17:15

Philippines	55–76	Iran
Scoring by quarter: 13–20, 15–19, 16–22, 11–15
Pts: 3 tied at 11; Rebs: de Ocampo, Douthit 8 Asts: 7 tied at 1		Pts: Jamshidi 19; Rebs: Sahakian 9 Asts: Mashayekhi, Jamshidi 2

Wuhan Sports Center Gymnasium, Wuhan

July 18
19:30

Report

China	73–84	Chinese Taipei
Scoring by quarter: 19–23, 15–11, 21–25, 18–25
Pts: Kelanbaike 22; Rebs: Tao 9 Asts: Wang 3		Pts: Liu 22; Rebs: Davis 9 Asts: Chen 3

Wuhan Sports Center Gymnasium, Wuhan

=== 7th place ===
July 19
12:30

Live Stats

India	85–36	Singapore
Scoring by quarter: 26–10, 23–3, 21–19, 15–4
Pts: Amj. Singh 30; Rebs: Amr. Singh 10; Asts: Bhriguvanshi 5		Pts: Oh 13; Rebs: Low, Wong W.L. 5 Asts: Oh 2

Wuhan Sports Center Gymnasium, Wuhan
Referees: Mohd Naser Abu Rashed (JOR), Chen Ying-cheng (TPE), Duan Zhu (CHN)

=== 5th place ===
July 19
14:45

Live Stats

Jordan	79–72	Japan
Scoring by quarter: 23–21, 12–19, 20–13, 24–19
Pts: Wright, Al-Sous 17; Rebs: Al-Dwairi 16; Asts: Wright 4		Pts: Takeuchi K. 20; Rebs: Ishizaki 7 Asts: Takeuchi J. 5

Wuhan Sports Center Gymnasium, Wuhan
Referees: Mei Wang (CHN), Ricor Buaron (PHI), Ceciline Michael Vino Vincent Francis Victor (IND)

=== 3rd place ===
July 19
17:15

Live Stats

China	79–80	Philippines
Scoring by quarter: 24–15, 20–23, 18–22, 17–20
Pts: Kelanbaike 23; Rebs: Zhou 7 Asts: Wang 5		Pts: De Ocampo 18; Rebs: Douthit 22; Asts: Tenorio 4

Wuhan Sports Center Gymnasium, Wuhan
Referees: Marwan Egho(LIB), Snehal Bendke (IND), Amirhossein Safarzadeh (IRI)

=== Final ===
July 19
19:30

Report

Chinese Taipei	79–89	Iran
Scoring by quarter: 21–26, 21–16, 20–24, 17–23
Pts: Davis III 19; Rebs: Davis III 12; Asts: Chen 5		Pts: Haddadi 21; Rebs: Kazemi 10; Asts: Zangeneh 2

Wuhan Sports Center Gymnasium, Wuhan
Referees: Arsen Andyrushkin (KAZ), Ferdinand Pascual (PHI), Naohiko Uchihara (JPN)

== Final standing ==
Qualified for the 2015 FIBA Asia Championship

Rank	Team	Record
1st place, gold medalist(s)	Iran	6–1
2nd place, silver medalist(s)	Chinese Taipei	4–2
3rd place, bronze medalist(s)	Philippines	5–1
4	China	4–3
5	Jordan	3–3
6	Japan	3–4
7	India	3–4
8	Singapore	0–6
9	Indonesia	0–4

== Awards ==
2014 FIBA Asia Cup champions

Iran
Second title

- Most Valuable Player: (Iran) Hamed Haddadi
- PG – (China) Zirui Wang
- SG – (Philippines) Paul Lee
- SF – (Iran) mohammad jamshidi
- PF – (Chinese Taipei) Quincy Davis
- C – (Iran) Hamed Haddadi
