= Scott Flemming =

American basketball coach

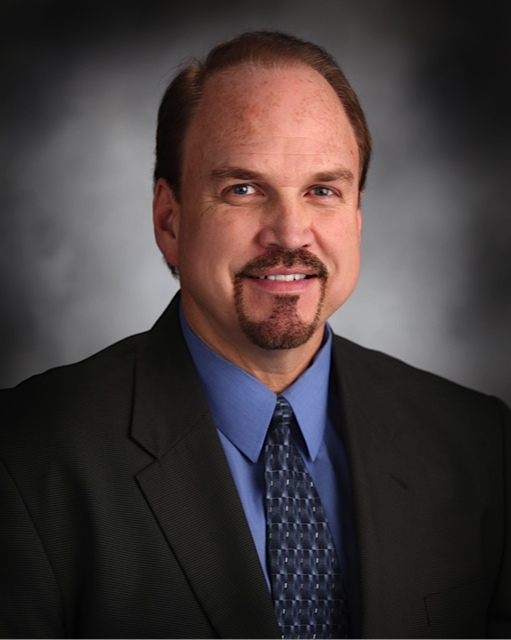

Personal information
- Born: 1958 (age 67–68) Boston, Massachusetts, U. S.

Career information
- High school: Louisville High School, Louisville, Ohio
- College: Mount Vernon Nazarene University
- Coaching career: 1982–present

Career history

Coaching
- 2012–2015: India
- 2024–2026: India
Medals
Men's basketball
Representing India
Lusofonia Games
Gold medal – first place	2014 Goa	Team

Scott William Flemming (born 1958) is an American professional basketball coach, who presently serves as the head coach of the Athletes in Action National Prep Team. Before this he was the head coach of the India men's national basketball team. Prior to this he served as the technical director of the NBA Academy India. Prior to returning to India he was the coach of Northwest Nazarene University, Nyack College and Mount Vernon Nazarene University. His overall college record as a coach is 448–291.

Flemming made sports headlines internationally through his work as the coach of India national basketball team, which he first coached from 2012 to 2015. He also served as the assistant coach (2010–2012) for Texas Legends, the NBA Development League team of Dallas Mavericks. Flemming further directed numerous basketball camps and coached internationally in Sweden, Poland, South Africa, Mexico and Jamaica. He also appeared on the Professional Perspectives Podcast for Season 5, episode 5.

== Achievements ==
=== India national team ===
- Gold at the South Asian Championship (2014, 2015)
- Gold in the 2014 Lusofonia Games

=== US college ===
- Two time national coach of the year (1998, 2000)
- Teams won 3 conference tournaments and 2 regular season championships
- Teams were in the top 20 national rankings for 10 seasons, unanimous no. 1 in 1999
