= Rikin Pethani =

Indian basketball player (born 1990)

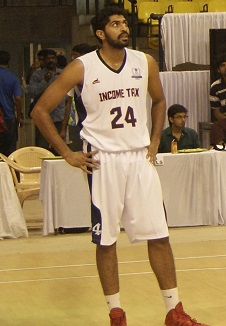
- Rikin Pethani with Income Tax in 2015

Chennai Slam
- Position: Center
- League: UBA Pro Basketball League

Personal information
- Born: 2 December 1990 (age 35) Himatnagar, Gujarat
- Listed height: 6 ft 8 in (2.03 m)

Career information
- Playing career: 2011–present

Career history
- 2017–present: Chennai Slam (India)
Medals
Men's basketball
Representing India
Lusophony Games
Gold medal – first place	2014 Goa	Team

Rikin Shantilal Pethani (born 2 December 1990) is an Indian professional basketball player. He currently plays for Chennai Slam of India's UBA Pro Basketball League.

== Early life ==
He grew up in Himatnagar, Gujarat and played cricket until 8th grade, when a coach discovered his talent for basketball.

== National career ==
He was a member of India's national basketball team at the 2016 FIBA Asia Challenge in Tehran, Iran. Pethani was also a former captain for the team.
