= Dilip Gurumurthy =

Indian basketball player (born 1956)

Personal information
- Nationality: Indian
- Born: 18 September 1956 (age 68); Karnataka, India

Sport
- Sport: Basketball

Dilip Gurumurthy (born 18 September 1956) is an Indian basketball player. He competed in the men's tournament at the 1980 Summer Olympics.
