= Vishesh Bhriguvanshi =

Indian basketball player (born 1991)

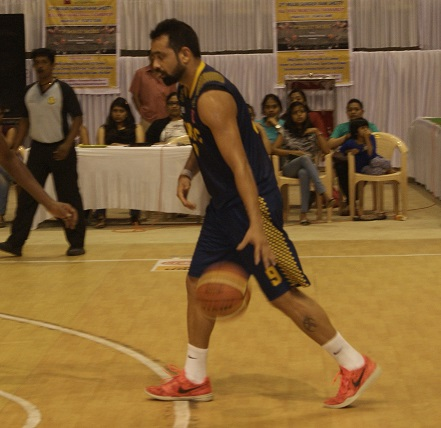
- Bhriguvanshi with ONGC in India in 2015

No. 9 – India
- Position: Shooting guard / small forward

Personal information
- Born: 13 November 1991 (age 35) Varanasi, Uttar Pradesh
- Listed height: 192 cm (6 ft 4 in)
- Listed weight: 98 kg (216 lb)

Career information
- High school: UP College, Varanasi
- NBA draft: 2011: undrafted
- Playing career: 2009–present
- Number: 9

Career history
- 2009: Young Cagers
- 2008–2011: North Western Railway Jaipur
- 2012–2016: ONGC Uttarakhand Dehradoon
- 2016: T-Rex Basketball Club
- 2017: Bengaluru Beast
- 2017: Adelaide 36ers
Medals
Representing India
South Asian Games
Gold medal – first place	2019 Kathmandu
Silver medal – second place	2010 Dhaka
Lusofonia Games
Gold medal – first place	2014 India	Team

Vishesh Bhriguvanshi (born 13 November 1991) is an Indian professional basketball player who is the captain of the Indian National Basketball Team, and most recently, a player with the Adelaide 36ers of the National Basketball League (NBL). Bhriguvanshi was awarded the Arjuna Award by the government of India for the year 2020.

Bhriguvanshi also has a biography by Nirupma Baghley, titled Vishesh: Code To Win, about him being India's youngest captain.

== Early life ==
Bhriguvanshi was born in Rajput Family of Uttar Pradesh. His father was a lecturer and his mother was a principal in a Government College.

His career began with participation in the Varanasi U-13 district meet. At the age of 17, Bhriguvanshi was recruited to the Senior Indian men's team.

== Professional career ==
Bhriguvanshi began playing competitive basketball in 2009 at the Asian Club Championships. In 2017, Bhriguvanshi averaged 30.8 points, 9.5 rebounds and 8.2 assists in 11 games for Bengaluru Beast in the United Basketball Alliance of India Pro Basketball League. In one match against rival Hyderabad, he poured in 57 points and registered 11 assists.

On 7 July 2017, Bhriguvanshi signed a one-year training deal with the Adelaide 36ers of the Australian National Basketball League, becoming the league's first Indian player. He is the first Indian to be signed by Australia's National Basketball League (NBL) in 2017.

== National team career ==
Bhriguvanshi made his debut for the India national basketball team in 2009 at the FIBA Asia Championship. He has since competed at the 2011 FIBA Asia Championship, 2013 FIBA Asia Championship, 2014 FIBA Asia Cup, 2015 FIBA Asia Championship, and 2016 FIBA Asia Challenge. At the 2016 FIBA Asia Challenge in Iran, Bhriguvanshi averaged a career-best 16.9 points per game, to go with 4.4 rebounds, 3.8 assists and 2.5 steals in eight games.

== Championship ==
Bhriguvanshi helped India win a 3x3 basketball gold medal at the Asian Beach Games in 2008 and has since played in every major FIBA Asia Championship.

He has won three domestic national championships with Indian Railways and, in 2011, was appointed by Oil and Natural Gas Corporation as its Brand ambassador.
