= Palpreet Singh Brar =

Indian basketball player

Palpreet Singh Brar (born 3 January 1994) is an Indian basketball player from Punjab. He plays for the India men's national basketball team as a 'Centre' and captained the Indian senior men's team. He plays for Railways in the domestic tournaments.

== Early life ==
He is from Kothe Surgapuri,village, in the Gidderbaha taluk, near Doda in Muktsar district, Punjab. He started playing basketball in Ludhiana in Class 9. In 2009 he joined the Ludhiana Basketball Academy, but after three months left the game home sick. However, in 2010, he returned to the academy as a 16-year-old and settled under basketball coach S Subramaniam and mentor Teja Singh Dhaliwal, the then secretary of the Punjab Basketball Association. He works Is Deputy Chief Inspector of trains in the Indian Railways at Ludhiana. His father's name is Farjinder Singh Brar, who stays in Doda with his wife and two children. Brar has an younger brother and a sister.

== Career ==
Brar made his debut for senior India team in the Incheon Asian Games in 2014. In 2014, he also played the FIBA Asia Cup.

In 2016 he became the second Indian to be drafted into the NBA D-League and he was picked by the Long Island Nets, New York. Satnam Singh, another Punjab cager, was the first to play NBA league from India.

In 2019 and 2023, he played the FIBA Basketball World Cup Asian Qualifiers. Later in 2023, he also represented India in the FIBA Olympic Pre-Qualifying Tournament at Syria. In 2025, he played the FIBA Asia Cup 2025 Qualifiers and later in August 2025, he led the Indian team in the Asia Cup at Jeddah, Saudi Arabia. He also played both the matches in the FIBA Basketball World Cup 2027 Asian Qualifiers.
