= Harbhajan Singh (basketball) =

Indian basketball player

Personal information
- Nationality: Indian
- Born: 12 April 1950 (age 74)

Sport
- Sport: Basketball

Harbhajan Singh (born 12 April 1950) is an Indian basketball player. He competed in the men's tournament at the 1980 Summer Olympics.
