= 2004 FIBA Asia Stanković Cup =

1st Stanković Cup

Tournament details
- Host country: Republic of China
- Dates: November 21–27
- Teams: 8 (from 44 federations)
- Venue: 1 (in 1 host city)

Final positions
- Champions: Qatar (1st title)

The FIBA Asia Stanković Cup 2004 served as the qualifying tournament for the 2005 FIBA Asia Championship. This competition is distinct from the Stanković Cup intercontinental tournament attended by teams outside the FIBA Asia zone.

== Qualification ==
According to the FIBA Asia rules, each zone had one place, and the hosts team (Chinese Taipei) and Asian champion (China) were automatically qualified. The other three places are allocated to the zones according to performance in the 2003 ABC Championship.

East Asia (2+1+1)	Gulf (1+1)	Middle Asia (1)	Southeast Asia (1)	West Asia (1+1)
Chinese Taipei	Qatar	India	Philippines	Iran
~~China~~ *	Kuwait			Syria
Japan				
South Korea				

* Withdrew

== Draw ==
Group A	Group B
Chinese Taipei; South Korea; Kuwait; India	Qatar; Syria; ~~Iran~~ * Philippines; Japan

* Withdrew

== Preliminary round ==
=== Group A ===
Team	Pld	W	L	PF	PA	PD	Pts	Tiebreaker
Chinese Taipei	3	2	1	267	211	+56	5	1–1 / 1.116
South Korea	3	2	1	262	220	+42	5	1–1 / 1.090
India	3	2	1	213	237	−24	5	1–1 / 0.816
Kuwait	3	0	3	183	257	−74	3	

November 21
18:00

India	61–98	Chinese Taipei
Scoring by quarter: 6–26, 28–23, 9–26, 18–23

TPEC Gymnasium, Taipei

November 22
18:00

South Korea	92–64	Kuwait
Scoring by quarter: 19–14, 24–13, 21–16, 28–21

TPEC Gymnasium, Taipei

November 23
20:00

Chinese Taipei	94–56	Kuwait
Scoring by quarter: 21–20, 22–8, 23–10, 28–18

TPEC Gymnasium, Taipei

November 24
20:00

India	81–76	South Korea
Scoring by quarter: 20–17, 19–17, 27–10, 15–32

TPEC Gymnasium, Taipei

November 25
16:00

Kuwait	63–71	India
Scoring by quarter: 14–18, 15–20, 14–15, 20–18

TPEC Gymnasium, Taipei

November 25
20:00

South Korea	94–75	Chinese Taipei
Scoring by quarter: 24–29, 25–14, 18–19, 27–13

TPEC Gymnasium, Taipei

=== Group B ===
Team	Pld	W	L	PF	PA	PD	Pts	Tiebreaker
Syria	3	2	1	253	207	+46	5	1–1 / 1.106
Qatar	3	2	1	256	198	+58	5	1–1 / 1.041
Japan	3	2	1	232	193	+39	5	1–1 / 0.857
Philippines	3	0	3	164	307	−143	3	

November 21
15:00

Syria	82–56	Japan
Scoring by quarter: 25–16, 25–19, 13–11, 19–10

TPEC Gymnasium, Taipei

November 22
20:00

Qatar	105–53	Philippines
Scoring by quarter: 32–10, 27–18, 26–10, 20–15

TPEC Gymnasium, Taipei

November 23
18:00

Syria	75–86	Qatar
Scoring by quarter: 22–21, 24–15, 10–28, 19–22

TPEC Gymnasium, Taipei

November 24
16:00

Qatar	65–70	Japan
Scoring by quarter: 18–19, 18–15, 14–23, 15–13

TPEC Gymnasium, Taipei

November 24
18:00

Philippines	65–96	Syria
Scoring by quarter: 10–26, 16–15, 19–35, 20–20

TPEC Gymnasium, Taipei

November 25
18:00

Japan	106–46	Philippines
Scoring by quarter: 31–5, 28–13, 23–7, 24–21

TPEC Gymnasium, Taipei

== Classification 5th–8th ==
Semifinals
November 26
India	111
Philippines	93
November 26
Japan	61
Kuwait	48

5th place
November 27
India	65
Japan	75
7th place
November 27
Philippines	66
Kuwait	88

=== Semifinals ===
November 26
14:00

India	111–93	Philippines
Scoring by quarter: 25–19, 27–17, 25–29, 34–28

TPEC Gymnasium, Taipei

November 26
16:00

Japan	61–48	Kuwait
Scoring by quarter: 24–11, 11–13, 14–15, 12–9

TPEC Gymnasium, Taipei

=== 7th place ===
November 27
14:00

Philippines	66–88	Kuwait
Scoring by quarter: 17–24, 26–20, 12–24, 11–20

TPEC Gymnasium, Taipei

=== 5th place ===
November 27
16:00

India	65–75	Japan
Scoring by quarter: 16–30, 20–9, 9–20, 20–16

TPEC Gymnasium, Taipei

== Final round ==
Semifinals
November 26
Syria	82
South Korea	88
November 26
Chinese Taipei	49
Qatar	71

Final
November 27
South Korea	65
Qatar	82
3rd place
November 27
Syria	60
Chinese Taipei	82

=== Semifinals ===
November 26
18:00

Syria	82–88	South Korea
Scoring by quarter: 24–14, 20–27, 16–26, 22–21
Pts: Al-Samman 16		Pts: Lee K.J. 22

TPEC Gymnasium, Taipei

November 26
20:00

Chinese Taipei	49–71	Qatar
Scoring by quarter: 8–15, 15–15, 7–9, 19–32
Pts: Tien L. 17		Pts: Abdulrahman 18

TPEC Gymnasium, Taipei

=== 3rd place ===
November 27
18:00

Syria	60–82	Chinese Taipei
Scoring by quarter: 11–18, 14–11, 16–21, 19–32
Pts: Abo-Sada 13		Pts: Tien L., Chang C.F. 15

TPEC Gymnasium, Taipei

=== Final ===
November 27
20:00

South Korea	65–82	Qatar
Scoring by quarter: 16–25, 11–27, 17–14, 21–16
Pts: Chu C.M. 25		Pts: Ismail 27

TPEC Gymnasium, Taipei

== Final standing ==
Qualified for the 2005 FIBA Asia Championship

Rank	Team	Record
1st place, gold medalist(s)	Qatar	4–1
2nd place, silver medalist(s)	South Korea	3–2
3rd place, bronze medalist(s)	Chinese Taipei	3–2
4	Syria	2–3
5	Japan	4–1
6	India	3–2
7	Kuwait	1–4
8	Philippines	0–5

== Awards ==
2004 Stanković Cup Champions

Qatar
First title

== See also ==
- List of sporting events in Taiwan
