= Narender Kumar Grewal =

Indian basketball player (born 1988)

Narendra Kumar Grewal
Personal information
- Born: 25 June 1988 (age 38)
- Position: Guard
Medals
Representing India
Lusofonia Games
Gold medal – first place	2014 India	Team

Narender Kumar Grewal (born 25 June 1988) is an Indian basketball player from Bhiwani, Haryana. He plays as a position guard.
