= Basketball at the 2014 Lusofonia Games =

The Basketball tournament at the 2014 Lusophony Games was held in Goa, India from 23 to 27 January 2014. The winners were India (Men's tournament) and Mozambique (women's tournament).

== Basketball at the 2014 Lusophony Games ==
Basketball at the 2014 Lusophony Games
- League: Lusophony Games
- Sport: Basketball
- Duration: 23 – 27 January 2014
- Teams: 6 / 4
- Medallists: (gold) India (M); (silver) Angola; (bronze) Mozambique; (gold) Mozambique (W); (silver) Angola; (bronze) India

Lusophony Games Basketball seasons
- ← 2009 Basketball at the 2021 Lusophony Games →

=== Competition format ===
A round-robin tournament was played.

==== Calendar ====
P	Preliminaries	½	Semifinals	F	Final

Event↓/Date →	Thu 23	Fri 24	Sat 25	Sun 26	Mon 27
Men	P	P	P	½	F
Women	Day 1		Day 2		Day 3

==== Men's competition ====
Group A	Group B
Cape Verde; Macau; Mozambique	Angola; India; Guinea-Bissau

==== Women's competition ====
Angola
India
Macau
Mozambique

=== Medal summary ===
==== Medal table ====
Rank	Nation	Gold	Silver	Bronze	Total
1	India (IND)	1	0	1	2
1	Mozambique (MOZ)	1	0	1	2
3	Angola (ANG)	0	2	0	2
Totals (3 entries)		2	2	2	6

==== Events ====
Event	Gold	Silver	Bronze
Men	India Amjyot Singh; Amritpal Singh; Daley Fernandes; Joginder Singh; Lambert Fernandes; Narender Grewal; Palpreet Singh Brar; Pratham Singh; Rikin Pethani; Sambhaji Kadam; Vishesh Bhriguvanshi; Yadwinder Singh; Coach: Scott Flemming	Angola André Miguel; António Deográcio; António Monteiro; Bráulio Morais; Edmir Lucas; Edson Hilukilwa; Edson Ndoniema; Hermenegildo Santos; Islando Manuel; Mutau Fonseca; Yuri Suingue; Zola Paulo; Coach: Manuel Sousa "Necas"	Mozambique Armando Baptista; Augusto Matos; Custódio Muchate; Dércio David; Ermelindo Novela; Hugo Martins; Ismael Nurmamad; Luís Barros; Nelson Jossias; Pio Matos; Samora Mucavel; Sika Koko; Coach: Horácio Martins
Women	Mozambique Amélia Macamo; Ana Azinheira; Anabela Cossa; Deolinda Gimo; Deolinda Ngulela; Filomena Micato; Ilda Chambe; Leia Dongue; Rute Muianga; Odélia Mafanela; Sheila Ventura; Valerdina Manhonga; Coach: Nazir Salé	Angola Ana Gonçalves; Analzira Américo; Angelina Golome; Elsa Eduardo; Helena Francisco; Judith Queta; Letícia André; Madalena; Merciana Fernandes; Rosemira Daniel; Rosa Gala; Cristina Matiquite; Coach: Elisa Pires	India Ishwari Pingle; Jeena Skaria; Kezia Fernandes; Nelvie Mendes; Neenumol P.S. Pooja Mol K.S. Preeti Kumari; R. Rajaganapathi; Sharanjeet Kaur; Shireen Limaye; Smruthi Radhakrishman; Stephy Nixon; Coach: Francisco Garcia

=== Final standings ===
Rank	Men				Women			
Rank	Team	Pld	W	L	Team	Pld	W	L
1st place, gold medalist(s)	India	4	4	0	Mozambique	3	3	0
2nd place, silver medalist(s)	Angola	4	3	1	Angola	3	2	1
3rd place, bronze medalist(s)	Mozambique	4	3	1	India	3	1	2
4.	Cape Verde	4	1	3	Macau	3	0	3
5.	Macau	3	1	2				
6.	Guinea-Bissau	3	0	3				

=== External links ===
- Official website
