= FIBA Asia Cup Most Valuable Player =

The FIBA Asia Cup Most Valuable Player Award is a FIBA award given every two years, to the Most Outstanding player throughout the tournament.

== Winners ==
Year	Player	Position	Team	Ref.
1960	Carlos Badion	Guard	Philippines	
1973	William Adornado	Forward	Philippines	
1983	Guo Yonglin	Forward	China	
1985	Allan Caidic	Guard	Philippines	
1987	Lee Chung-hee	Guard	South Korea	
1995	Hur Jae	Guard	South Korea	
1997	Chun Hee-chul	Forward	South Korea	
1999	Hu Weidong	Guard	China	
2001	Yao Ming	Center	China	
2003	Yao Ming (2)	Center	China	
2005	Yao Ming (3)	Center	China	
2007	Hamed Haddadi	Center	Iran	
2009	Hamed Haddadi (2)	Center	Iran	
2011	Yi Jianlian	Forward	China	
2013	Hamed Haddadi (3)	Center	Iran	
2015	Yi Jianlian (2)	Forward	China	
2017	Hamed Haddadi (4)	Center	Iran	
2022	Wael Arakji	Guard	Lebanon	
2025	Jaylin Galloway	Forward	Australia	
