= 2025 FIBA Asia Cup =

31st continental basketball championship in Asia

بطولة أمم آسيا لكرة السلة 2025

Tournament details
- Host country: Saudi Arabia
- City: Jeddah
- Dates: 5–17 August
- Teams: 16 (from 1 confederation)
- Venue: 1 (in 1 host city)

Final positions
- Champions: Australia (3rd title)
- Runners-up: China
- Third place: Iran
- Fourth place: New Zealand

Tournament statistics
- Games played: 36
- Attendance: 39,473 (1,096 per game)
- MVP: (Australia) Jaylin Galloway
- Top scorer: (Saudi Arabia) Muhammad-Ali Abdur-Rahkman (26.0 ppg)

Official website
- 2025 FIBA Asia Cup

The 2025 FIBA Asia Cup was the 31st edition of the FIBA Asia Cup, the continental men's basketball championship in Asia. It was held from 5 to 17 August 2025. The tournament was organized by FIBA Asia and returned to its usual four-year cycle, after the previous tournament was delayed to 2022 due to the COVID-19 pandemic.

Saudi Arabia hosted the tournament for the second time after staging the 1997 edition.

Australia entered the tournament as defending champions after beating Lebanon in the 2022 final. They defended their title with a win over China in the final, 90–89.

== Host selection ==
On 7 December 2023, Saudi Arabia was selected to host the Asia Cup in 2025, with games to be played in Jeddah.

== Qualification ==
Map of qualifiers for the 2025 FIBA Asia Cup: Team qualified for 2025 FIBA Asia Cup Team failed to qualify Did not enter

30 teams took part in qualification, including the hosts Saudi Arabia, who participated for preparation reasons.

The qualification started on 22 June 2022. Teams that did not manage to advance to the 2023 FIBA Basketball World Cup qualification and the teams that did not participate in it played in the first round of the pre-qualifiers. Pre-qualifiers were held in the western and eastern regions to determine the eight teams who will join the 16 teams that participated in the 2022 FIBA Asia Cup. In the qualifiers, 24 teams (12 in West and East region) are split into six groups of four, with three groups allocated to each region. The top two from each group qualified for the Asia Cup while the third place teams advanced to the final qualifying tournament, where the top two from each region qualifies for the Asia Cup.

Of the teams who qualified, 13 of them participated in the last edition. Guam will make their debut at this tournament, becoming the third Oceanian team to qualify for the tournament after Australia and New Zealand. Iraq and 2027 FIBA Basketball World Cup hosts Qatar, also qualified after missing out on 2022.

Of the teams who failed to qualify, Kazakhstan didn't advance after appearing at the previous four tournaments. Their non qualification marks the first time since 1993 that no countries from Central Asia will be present at the Asia Cup. 2022 FIBA Asia Cup and 2023 FIBA Basketball World Cup hosts, Indonesia failed to qualify after losing all their games in the qualifiers. Bahrain also missed out, after losing both of their games in the final qualification round.

=== Qualified teams ===
Team	Qualification method	Date of qualification	Appearance(s)				Previous best performance (Note: Bold text indicates they hosted that edition.)	WR (Note: World ranking at start of tournament.)
Team	Qualification method	Date of qualification	Total	First	Last	Streak	Previous best performance	WR
Saudi Arabia	Host nation	7 December 2023	10th	1989	2022	2	Third place (1999)	65
Australia	Group A top two	24 November 2024	3rd	2017	2022	3	Champions (2017, 2022)	7
Japan	Group C top two	24 November 2024	30th	1960	2022	29	Champions (1965, 1971)	21
Philippines	Group B top two	25 November 2024	29th	1960	2022	8	Champions (1960, 1963, 1967, 1973, 1985)	34
New Zealand	Group B top two	25 November 2024	3rd	2017	2022	3	Third place (2022)	22
Lebanon	Group F top two	25 November 2024	11th	1999	2022	4	Runners-up (2001, 2005, 2007, 2022)	29
Jordan	Group D top two	25 November 2024	17th	1983	2022	10	Runners-up (2011)	35
South Korea	Group A top two	20 February 2025	31st	1960	2022	31	Champions (1969, 1997)	53
China	Group C top two	20 February 2025	24th	1975	2022	24	Champions (Sixteen times) (Note: China has won in 1975, 1977, 1979, 1981, 1983, 1987, 1989, 1991, 1993, 1995, 1999, 2001, 2003, 2005, 2011, and 2015.)	30
Iran	Group E top two	21 February 2025	19th	1973	2022	10	Champions (2007, 2009, 2013)	28
Qatar	Group E top two	21 February 2025	11th	1991	2017	1	Third place (2003, 2005)	87
Syria	Group F top two	24 February 2025	8th	1999	2022	3	Fourth place (2001)	71
Chinese Taipei	Group G top two	21 March 2025	26th	1960	2022	19	Runners-up (1960, 1963)	75
Guam	Group G top two	21 March 2025	1st	Debut				91
India	Group H top two	22 March 2025	27th	1965	2022	11	Fourth place (1975)	81
Iraq	Group H top two	23 March 2025	5th	1977	2017	1	Sixth place (1977)	93

== Draw ==
The draw took place on 8 April 2025 in Jeddah.

Each group could contain only one team from the East Asia (EABA), Gulf (GBA) and Oceania region/sub-zones. Additionally, each group had to contain a minimum of one and a maximum of two teams from the West Asia (WABA) sub-zone.

=== Seeding ===
The seeding was announced on 4 April 2025 and was based on the FIBA Men's World Ranking of 28 March 2025. Hosts Saudi Arabia had the right to choose which pot they were seeded in, and selected Pot 1.

Pot 1
Team	Pos
Saudi Arabia	65
Australia	7
Japan	21
New Zealand	22

Pot 2
Team	Pos
Iran	28
Lebanon	29
China	30
Philippines	34

Pot 3
Team	Pos
Jordan	35
South Korea	53
Syria	71
Chinese Taipei	73

Pot 4
Team	Pos
India	76
Qatar	87
Guam	88
Iraq	92

== Squads ==
Each team has a roster of twelve players. A team may opt to allocate a roster spot to a naturalized player.

== Preliminary round ==
All times are local (UTC+3).

=== Group A ===
Pos	Team	Pld	W	L	PF	PA	PD	Pts	Qualification
1	Australia	3	3	0	300	223	+77	6	Quarterfinals
2	South Korea	3	2	1	255	266	−11	5	Playoffs
3	Lebanon	3	1	2	250	270	−20	4	Playoffs
4	Qatar	3	0	3	245	291	−46	3	

Source: FIBA
Rules for classification: 1) Points; 2) Head-to-head results; 3) Points difference; 4) Points scored.

6 August 2025
11:00

Boxscore

Australia	97–61	South Korea
Scoring by quarter: 25–17, 23–14, 20–16, 29–14
Pts: McVeigh 20; Rebs: Magnay 9 Asts: Foxwell 3		Pts: Lee J. 20; Rebs: Lee H. 8 Asts: Yang 3

King Abdullah Sports City, Jeddah
Attendance: 76
Referees: Ahmed Al-Shuwaili (IRQ), Mohammad Taha (JOR), Chuang Chih-chun (TPE)

6 August 2025
21:00

Boxscore

Qatar	80–84	Lebanon
Scoring by quarter: 11–16, 24–19, 16–26, 29–23
Pts: Goodwin 33; Rebs: Hadžibegović 13; Asts: Goodwin 7		Pts: Lawson, Mansour 12; Rebs: Lawson 7 Asts: Mezher 4

King Abdullah Sports City, Jeddah
Attendance: 1,561
Referees: Yevgeniy Mikheyev (KAZ), Sun Jian (CHN), Glenn Cornelio (PHI)

8 August 2025
11:00

Boxscore

South Korea	97–83	Qatar
Scoring by quarter: 25–22, 28–16, 22–23, 22–22
Pts: Lee H., Yu 24; Rebs: Ha 10; Asts: Lee J. 5		Pts: Goodwin 19; Rebs: Goodwin, Hadžibegović 7 Asts: Goodwin 6

King Abdullah Sports City, Jeddah
Attendance: 63
Referees: Yevgeniy Mikheyev (KAZ), Harja Jaladri (INA), Ryan Jones (NZL)

8 August 2025
18:00

Boxscore

Lebanon	80–93	Australia
Scoring by quarter: 14–31, 24–27, 22–26, 20–9
Pts: Khayat 22; Rebs: Khayat, Mansour 6 Asts: Mansour 5		Pts: Galloway, Smith 18; Rebs: White 10; Asts: Hickey 9

King Abdullah Sports City, Jeddah
Attendance: 2,506
Referees: Ahmed Al-Shuwaili (IRQ), Glenn Cornelio (PHI), Abdullah Al-Hejaili (KSA)

10 August 2025
11:00

Boxscore

Qatar	82–110	Australia
Scoring by quarter: 20–22, 23–24, 20–31, 19–33
Pts: Goodwin 24; Rebs: Goodwin 7 Asts: Goodwin 5		Pts: Galloway 24; Rebs: Cooks, Wessels 6 Asts: Hickey 8

King Abdullah Sports City, Jeddah
Attendance: 39
Referees: Ahmed Al-Shuwaili (IRQ), Mohammad Taha (JOR), Chuang Chih-chun (TPE)

10 August 2025
18:00

Boxscore

South Korea	97–86	Lebanon
Scoring by quarter: 26–17, 26–19, 22–20, 23–30
Pts: Lee H., Yu 28; Rebs: Lee H. 6 Asts: Yang 8		Pts: Jamaleddine 15; Rebs: Haidar 7 Asts: four players 3

King Abdullah Sports City, Jeddah
Attendance: 1,563
Referees: Yevgeniy Mikheyev (KAZ), Harja Jaladri (INA), Sun Jian (CHN)

=== Group B ===
Pos	Team	Pld	W	L	PF	PA	PD	Pts	Qualification
1	Iran	3	3	0	237	165	+72	6	Quarterfinals
2	Japan	3	2	1	271	209	+62	5	Playoffs
3	Guam	3	1	2	197	252	−55	4	Playoffs
4	Syria	3	0	3	184	263	−79	3	

Source: FIBA
Rules for classification: 1) Points; 2) Head-to-head results; 3) Points difference; 4) Points scored.

6 August 2025
14:10

Boxscore

Japan	99–68	Syria
Scoring by quarter: 18–13, 14–28, 28–10, 39–17
Pts: Hawkinson 26; Rebs: Hawkinson 13; Asts: Hawkinson, Yoshii 4		Pts: DeShields 21; Rebs: DeShields 8 Asts: DeShields 7

King Abdullah Sports City, Jeddah
Attendance: 175
Referees: Ryan Jones (NZL), Ahmed Al-Bulushi (OMA), Abdullah Al-Hejaili (KSA)

6 August 2025
18:00

Boxscore

Guam	52–77	Iran
Scoring by quarter: 10–23, 10–18, 21–11, 11–25
Pts: Wesley 18; Rebs: Wesley 9 Asts: Cruz, Galloway 2		Pts: Aghajanpour 19; Rebs: Kazemi 12; Asts: Sheikhi 6

King Abdullah Sports City, Jeddah
Attendance: 88
Referees: Harja Jaladri (INA), Park Kyoung-jin (KOR), Preeda Muongmee (THA)

8 August 2025
14:10

Boxscore

Iran	78–70	Japan
Scoring by quarter: 16–13, 18–21, 24–24, 20–12
Pts: Amini 24; Rebs: Amini, Kazemi 8 Asts: Jafari 6		Pts: Tominaga 22; Rebs: Hawkinson 17; Asts: Toews, Togashi 4

King Abdullah Sports City, Jeddah
Attendance: 86
Referees: Sun Jian (CHN), Mohammad Taha (JOR), Preeda Muongmee (THA)

8 August 2025
21:00

Boxscore

Syria	73–82	Guam
Scoring by quarter: 21–27, 19–16, 19–21, 14–18
Pts: DeShields 29; Rebs: DeShields 8 Asts: DeShields 6		Pts: Cruz, Wesley 21; Rebs: Wesley 9 Asts: Ross, Wesley 8

King Abdullah Sports City, Jeddah
Attendance: 433
Referees: Ahmed Al-Bulushi (OMA), Park Kyoung-jin (KOR), Chuang Chih-chun (TPE)

10 August 2025
14:10

Boxscore

Guam	63–102	Japan
Scoring by quarter: 15–27, 18–25, 19–26, 11–24
Pts: Ross 17; Rebs: Galloway 7 Asts: Wesley 4		Pts: Tominaga 20; Rebs: Hawkinson 8 Asts: Harper, Toews 5

King Abdullah Sports City, Jeddah
Attendance: 44
Referees: Glenn Cornelio (PHI), Ahmed Al-Bulushi (OMA), Abdullah Al-Hejaili (KSA)

10 August 2025
21:00

Boxscore

Syria	43–82	Iran
Scoring by quarter: 11–13, 12–12, 11–32, 9–25
Pts: DeShields 16; Rebs: Abdullah 7 Asts: DeShields 3		Pts: Aghajanpour 24; Rebs: Kazemi 12; Asts: Kazemi 5

King Abdullah Sports City, Jeddah
Attendance: 449
Referees: Park Kyoung-jin (KOR), Preeda Muongmee (THA), Ryan Jones (NZL)

=== Group C ===
Pos	Team	Pld	W	L	PF	PA	PD	Pts	Qualification
1	China	3	3	0	283	225	+58	6	Quarterfinals
2	Saudi Arabia (H)	3	2	1	249	225	+24	5	Playoffs
3	Jordan	3	1	2	232	251	−19	4	Playoffs
4	India	3	0	3	212	275	−63	3	

Source: FIBA
Rules for classification: 1) Points; 2) Head-to-head results; 3) Points difference; 4) Points scored.
(H) Hosts

5 August 2025
14:00

Boxscore

Jordan	91–84 (OT)	India
Scoring by quarter: 18–14, 20–24, 22–17, 20–25, Overtime: 11–4
Pts: Tucker 30; Rebs: Abbas, Ibrahim 7 Asts: Ibrahim 6		Pts: Muthu Krishnan 14; Rebs: Prince 7 Asts: Prince 5

King Abdullah Sports City, Jeddah
Attendance: 52
Referees: Scott Beker (AUS), Ahmed Al-Bulushi (OMA), Preeda Muongmee (THA)

5 August 2025
18:00

Boxscore

China	93–88	Saudi Arabia
Scoring by quarter: 30–22, 23–21, 27–22, 13–23
Pts: Hu J. 20; Rebs: Yu 7 Asts: Zhao R. 6		Pts: Abdur-Rahkman 32; Rebs: Abdel Gabar 8 Asts: Abdel Gabar 9

King Abdullah Sports City, Jeddah
Attendance: 1,751
Referees: Takaki Kato (JPN), Park Kyoung-jin (KOR), Paul Skayem (LBN)

7 August 2025
11:00

Boxscore

India	69–100	China
Scoring by quarter: 14–29, 17–24, 17–22, 21–25
Pts: Muthu Krishnan 16; Rebs: Prince 7 Asts: Dagar 5		Pts: Hu M., Zhao J. 17; Rebs: Hu J. 10; Asts: Liao 8

King Abdullah Sports City, Jeddah
Attendance: 99
Referees: Rabah Noujaim (LBN), Glenn Cornelio (PHI), Paul Skayem (LBN)

7 August 2025
21:00

Boxscore

Saudi Arabia	77–73	Jordan
Scoring by quarter: 21–17, 27–14, 19–22, 10–20
Pts: Abdur-Rahkman 25; Rebs: Al-Suwailem 15; Asts: Abdel Gabar, Abdur-Rahkman 7		Pts: Al-Hamarsheh, Ibrahim 19; Rebs: Tucker 8 Asts: Ibrahim 5

King Abdullah Sports City, Jeddah
Attendance: 1,807
Referees: Yevgeniy Mikheyev (KAZ), Wissam Zein (SYR), Preeda Muongmee (THA)

9 August 2025
14:00

Boxscore

China	90–68	Jordan
Scoring by quarter: 24–14, 23–24, 18–12, 25–18
Pts: Cheng 20; Rebs: Hu J. 11; Asts: Hu M. 6		Pts: Tucker 27; Rebs: three players 6 Asts: Kanaan 3

King Abdullah Sports City, Jeddah
Attendance: 370
Referees: Scott Beker (AUS), Ahmed Al-Bulushi (OMA), Paul Skayem (LBN)

9 August 2025
18:00

Boxscore

India	59–84	Saudi Arabia
Scoring by quarter: 25–24, 6–21, 18–21, 10–18
Pts: Brar 20; Rebs: Prince 4 Asts: Muthu Krishnan, Sekhon 5		Pts: Al-Suwailem 15; Rebs: Al-Suwailem 14; Asts: Abdel Gabar 7

King Abdullah Sports City, Jeddah
Attendance: 3,230
Referees: Takaki Kato (JPN), Harja Jaladri (INA), Park Kyoung-jin (KOR)

=== Group D ===
Pos	Team	Pld	W	L	PF	PA	PD	Pts	Qualification
1	New Zealand	3	3	0	312	242	+70	6	Quarterfinals
2	Chinese Taipei	3	2	1	260	265	−5	5	Playoffs
3	Philippines	3	1	2	239	246	−7	4	Playoffs
4	Iraq	3	0	3	195	253	−58	3	

Source: FIBA
Rules for classification: 1) Points; 2) Head-to-head results; 3) Points difference; 4) Points scored.

5 August 2025
11:00

Boxscore

New Zealand	100–78	Iraq
Scoring by quarter: 24–16, 18–27, 21–18, 37–17
Pts: Britt 21; Rebs: Britt, Davison 7 Asts: Britt 4		Pts: Abdul Allah 19; Rebs: Al-Zuhairi 9 Asts: Mayfield 5

King Abdullah Sports City, Jeddah
Attendance: 24
Referees: Yevgeniy Mikheyev (KAZ), Harja Jaladri (INA), Mohammad Taha (JOR)

5 August 2025
21:00

Boxscore

Chinese Taipei	95–87	Philippines
Scoring by quarter: 27–16, 16–18, 30–28, 22–25
Pts: Chen Y. 34; Rebs: Gilbeck 9 Asts: Lin 3		Pts: Brownlee 19; Rebs: Edu 12; Asts: Ramos 6

King Abdullah Sports City, Jeddah
Attendance: 1,947
Referees: Rabah Noujaim (LBN), Wissam Zein (SYR), Sadegh Ghanabari (IRI)

7 August 2025
14:00

Boxscore

Iraq	60–87	Chinese Taipei
Scoring by quarter: 13–18, 15–21, 13–24, 19–24
Pts: Al-Ibraheemi 20; Rebs: Al-Ibraheemi, Hammoodi 7 Asts: Abdul Allah 4		Pts: Lin 22; Rebs: Gilbeck 10; Asts: Chen Y., Hu 3

King Abdullah Sports City, Jeddah
Attendance: 20
Referees: Scott Beker (AUS), Ahmed Al-Bulushi (OMA), Sadegh Ghanabari (IRI)

7 August 2025
18:00

Boxscore

Philippines	86–94	New Zealand
Scoring by quarter: 18–23, 23–32, 27–19, 18–20
Pts: Brownlee 37; Rebs: Thompson 7 Asts: Newsome, Thompson 4		Pts: Ngatai 22; Rebs: Gold 11; Asts: Britt 8

King Abdullah Sports City, Jeddah
Attendance: 3,333
Referees: Takaki Kato (JPN), Harja Jaladri (INA), Park Kyoung-jin (KOR)

9 August 2025
11:00

Boxscore

Iraq	57–66	Philippines
Scoring by quarter: 18–12, 15–21, 7–22, 17–11
Pts: Hammoodi, Ismael 13; Rebs: Al-Zuhairi 10; Asts: Abdul Allah 5		Pts: Ramos 21; Rebs: three players 7 Asts: Thompson 7

King Abdullah Sports City, Jeddah
Attendance: 1,808
Referees: Yevgeniy Mikheyev (KAZ), Sun Jian (CHN), Preeda Muongmee (THA)

9 August 2025
21:00

Boxscore

Chinese Taipei	78–118	New Zealand
Scoring by quarter: 18–19, 17–30, 24–35, 19–34
Pts: R. Hinton 24; Rebs: Gilbeck 5 Asts: Chen Y. 3		Pts: Cameron 28; Rebs: Cameron, Davison 9 Asts: Cameron 8

King Abdullah Sports City, Jeddah
Attendance: 64
Referees: Rabah Noujaim (LBN), Wissam Zein (SYR), Sadegh Ghanabari (IRI)

== Final round ==
=== Bracket ===
Playoffs
11 August
Saudi Arabia	88
Philippines (OT)	95
11 August
Chinese Taipei	78
Jordan	64
12 August
South Korea	99
Guam	66
12 August
Japan	73
Lebanon	97

Quarter-finals
13 August
Australia	84
Philippines	60
13 August
Iran	78
Chinese Taipei	75
14 August
China	79
South Korea	71
14 August
New Zealand	90
Lebanon	86

Semi-finals
16 August
Australia	92
Iran	48
16 August
China	98
New Zealand	84

Final
17 August
Australia	90
China	89
Third place
17 August
Iran	79
New Zealand	73

=== Playoffs ===
11 August 2025
14:00

Boxscore

Chinese Taipei	78–64	Jordan
Scoring by quarter: 21–17, 18–18, 21–14, 18–15
Pts: A. Hinton 18; Rebs: Gilbeck 12; Asts: Chen Y. 4		Pts: Tucker 20; Rebs: Abdull. Olajuwon 9 Asts: Al-Taweel 3

King Abdullah Sports City, Jeddah
Attendance: 68
Referees: Ahmed Al-Shuwaili (IRQ), Harja Jaladri (INA), Ahmed Al-Bulushi (OMA)

11 August 2025
19:00

Boxscore

Saudi Arabia	88–95 (OT)	Philippines
Scoring by quarter: 15–25, 22–15, 22–20, 20–19, Overtime: 9–16
Pts: Abdur-Rakhman 33; Rebs: Al-Suwailem 14; Asts: Abdel Gabar, Abdur-Rakhman 4		Pts: Brownlee 29; Rebs: Edu 12; Asts: Brownlee 5

King Abdullah Sports City, Jeddah
Attendance: 5,069
Referees: Yevgeniy Mikheyev (KAZ), Wissam Zein (SYR), Preeda Muongmee (THA)

12 August 2025
14:00

Boxscore

South Korea	99–66	Guam
Scoring by quarter: 17–18, 33–10, 26–17, 23–21
Pts: Moon 18; Rebs: Lee H. 9 Asts: Park 8		Pts: Kamai 19; Rebs: Galloway 9 Asts: Johnson 4

King Abdullah Sports City, Jeddah
Attendance: 34
Referees: Yevgeniy Mikheyev (KAZ), Preeda Muongmee (THA), Mohammad Taha (JOR)

12 August 2025
19:00

Boxscore

Japan	73–97	Lebanon
Scoring by quarter: 19–23, 22–30, 23–28, 9–16
Pts: Yoshii 16; Rebs: Hawkinson 9 Asts: three players 4		Pts: Lawson 24; Rebs: Lawson 10; Asts: Mansour 15

King Abdullah Sports City, Jeddah
Attendance: 1,966
Referees: Ahmed Al-Shuwaili (IRQ), Harja Jaladri (INA), Wissam Zein (SYR)

=== Quarterfinals ===
13 August 2025
14:00

Boxscore

Australia	84–60	Philippines
Scoring by quarter: 29–12, 19–16, 21–22, 15–10
Pts: Foxwell, Galloway 15; Rebs: White 8 Asts: Hickey 4		Pts: Quiambao 17; Rebs: Edu 8 Asts: Brownlee 4

King Abdullah Sports City, Jeddah
Attendance: 1,970
Referees: Ahmed Al-Shuwaili (IRQ), Wissam Zein (SYR), Mohammad Taha (JOR)

13 August 2025
19:00

Boxscore

Iran	78–75	Chinese Taipei
Scoring by quarter: 11–24, 15–18, 26–22, 26–11
Pts: Amini 30; Rebs: Kazemi 12; Asts: Amini, Jafari 3		Pts: Lin 22; Rebs: Gilbeck 7 Asts: four players 2

King Abdullah Sports City, Jeddah
Attendance: 52
Referees: Takaki Kato (JPN), Yevgeniy Mikheyev (KAZ), Preeda Muongmee (THA)

14 August 2025
14:00

Boxscore

China	79–71	South Korea
Scoring by quarter: 25–24, 21–11, 18–20, 15–16
Pts: Hu J. 23; Rebs: Hu J. 11; Asts: Cheng 6		Pts: Lee H. 22; Rebs: Ha 9 Asts: Yang 5

King Abdullah Sports City, Jeddah
Attendance: 441
Referees: Wissam Zein (SYR), Ahmed Al-Shuwaili (IRQ), Mohammad Taha (JOR)

14 August 2025
19:00

Boxscore

New Zealand	90–86	Lebanon
Scoring by quarter: 12–32, 18–13, 26–17, 34–24
Pts: King 23; Rebs: Darling 9 Asts: Davison 5		Pts: Lawson 24; Rebs: Lawson 13; Asts: Mansour 8

King Abdullah Sports City, Jeddah
Attendance: 3,097
Referees: Yevgeniy Mikheyev (KAZ), Takaki Kato (JPN), Glenn Cornelio (PHI)

=== Semifinals ===
16 August 2025
14:00

Boxscore

China	98–84	New Zealand
Scoring by quarter: 28–19, 14–21, 26–26, 30–18
Pts: Zhao R. 24; Rebs: Hu J. 8 Asts: Zhao R. 6		Pts: Britt 21; Rebs: Cameron 5 Asts: Britt 6

King Abdullah Sports City, Jeddah
Attendance: 725
Referees: Rabah Noujaim (LBN), Ahmed Al-Shuwaili (IRQ), Harja Jaladri (INA)

16 August 2025
19:00

Boxscore

Australia	92–48	Iran
Scoring by quarter: 27–20, 24–9, 29–8, 12–11
Pts: McVeigh 17; Rebs: Hickey 6 Asts: Hickey 6		Pts: Vahedi 11; Rebs: Sheikhi, Zangeneh 4 Asts: Kazemi, Sheikhi 3

King Abdullah Sports City, Jeddah
Attendance: 356
Referees: Takaki Kato (JPN), Yevgeniy Mikheyev (KAZ), Park Kyoung-jin (KOR)

=== Third place game ===
17 August 2025
14:00

Boxscore

Iran	79–73	New Zealand
Scoring by quarter: 28–20, 19–13, 19–21, 13–19
Pts: Jafari 22; Rebs: Kazemi 16; Asts: Jafari 5		Pts: Cameron 18; Rebs: Davison 8 Asts: five players 2

King Abdullah Sports City, Jeddah
Attendance: 57
Referees: Scott Beker (AUS), Wissam Zein (SYR), Glenn Cornelio (PHI)

=== Final ===
17 August 2025
19:00

Boxscore

Australia	90–89	China
Scoring by quarter: 17–25, 25–21, 26–25, 22–18
Pts: Cooks 30; Rebs: Cooks 9 Asts: Hickey, Magnay 4		Pts: Hu M. 26; Rebs: Hu J. 10; Asts: Zhao R. 6

King Abdullah Sports City, Jeddah
Attendance: 4,050
Referees: Rabah Noujaim (LBN), Yevgeniy Mikheyev (KAZ), Ahmed Al-Shuwaili (IRQ)

== Final standings ==
Rank	Team	Record
1st place, gold medalist(s)	Australia	6–0
2nd place, silver medalist(s)	China	5–1
3rd place, bronze medalist(s)	Iran	5–1
4	New Zealand	4–2
5	Chinese Taipei	3–2
6	South Korea	3–2
7	Philippines	2–3
8	Lebanon	2–3
9	Japan	2–2
10	Saudi Arabia	2–2
11	Jordan	1–3
12	Guam	1–3
13	Qatar	0–3
14	Iraq	0–3
15	India	0–3
16	Syria	0–3

== Statistics ==
=== Players ===
Points

Name	PPG
(Saudi Arabia) Muhammad-Ali Abdur-Rahkman	26.0
(Qatar) Brandon Goodwin	25.3
(Syria) Keron DeShields	22.0
(Philippines) Justin Brownlee	20.6
(Jordan) Dar Tucker	20.3

Rebounds

Name	RPG
(Saudi Arabia) Mohammed Al-Suwailem	12.5
(Japan) Josh Hawkinson	11.8
(Iran) Arsalan Kazemi	10.3
(China) Hu Jinqiu	9.2
(Philippines) A. J. Edu	9.0

Assists

Name	APG
(Saudi Arabia) Khalid Abdel Gabar	6.8
(Lebanon) Ali Mansour	6.4
(Philippines) Dwight Ramos	6.0
(Qatar) Brandon Goodwin	6.0
(Australia) William Hickey	5.5
(South Korea) Yang Jun-seok	5.5

Blocks

Name	BPG
(Saudi Arabia) Mohammed Al-Suwailem	2.8
(Chinese Taipei) Brandon Gilbeck	2.4
(Iraq) Abdullah Al-Ibraheemi	1.7
(India) Palpreet Singh Brar	1.7
(Philippines) A. J. Edu	1.6

Steals

Name	SPG
(India) Arvind Muthu Krishnan	2.3
(Qatar) Brandon Goodwin	2.3
(Lebanon) Karim Zeinoun	2.2
(India) Pranav Prince	2.2
(Syria) Keron DeShields	2.2
(Iran) Arsalan Kazemi	2.2

Efficiency

Name	EFFPG
(Saudi Arabia) Mohammed Al-Suwailem	28.3
(Qatar) Brandon Goodwin	25.0
(Japan) Josh Hawkinson	24.5
(Saudi Arabia) Muhammad-Ali Abdur-Rahkman	23.0
(China) Hu Jinqiu	22.2

=== Teams ===
Points

Team	PPG
Australia	94.3
New Zealand	93.2
China	91.5
Lebanon	86.6
Japan	86.0

Rebounds

Team	RPG
Australia	48.0
Philippines	42.4
New Zealand	41.3
Lebanon	40.8
Iraq	40.7

Assists

Team	APG
Lebanon	23.6
South Korea	22.2
Japan	21.0
New Zealand	20.7
Australia	19.8

Blocks

Team	BPG
Saudi Arabia	5.3
Australia	4.5
Iraq	4.3
India	4.0
Japan	4.0
Philippines	4.0

Steals

Team	SPG
Lebanon	10.2
South Korea	8.6
Qatar	8.3
New Zealand	8.3
India	7.3
Iran	7.3

Efficiency

Team	EFFPG
Australia	115.2
New Zealand	108.8
Lebanon	105.6
China	103.7
Japan	102.3

== Awards ==
2025 FIBA Asia Cup champions

Australia
3rd title

The awards were announced on 17 August 2025.

All-Tournament Team
Guards	Forwards	Center
(Iran) Sina Vahedi (Australia) Jaylin Galloway	(Australia) Jack McVeigh (China) Wang Junjie	(China) Hu Jinqiu
MVP: (Australia) Jaylin Galloway

== See also ==
- 2025 FIBA Women's Asia Cup
