= Yasser El Hajj =

Lebanese basketball player

Personal information
- Born: August 18, 1970 (age 56) Beirut, Lebanon
- Listed height: 6 ft 6 in (1.98 m)
- Listed weight: 112 kg (247 lb)

Career information
- NBA draft: 1992: undrafted
- Playing career: 1988–2005
- Position: Forward
Medals
Men's basketball
Representing Lebanon
FIBA Asia Championship
Silver medal – second place	2001 Shanghai	Team

Yasser El Hajj (Arabic: ياسر الحاج, born 18 August 1970) is a former Lebanese basketball player. He is the head coach of the Lebanese American University (LAU) Women Basketball Team. El Hajj, alongside former teammate Walid Doumiati, helped Sporting Al Riyadi Beirut after entering the title race with Beirut rivals Hekmeh BC. Yasser also competed for the Lebanon national basketball team in the 2001 ABC Championship.

== Personal life ==
After announcing his retirement in the 2004–2005 season with Champville SC, Yasser was elected as the Minister of Sports and Youth.
