= Macau women's national under-18 basketball team =

Macau
- FIBA zone: FIBA Asia
- National federation: Macau - China Basketball Association

U19 World Cup
- Appearances: None

U18 Asia Cup
- Appearances: 3
- Medals: None

The Macau women's national under-18 basketball team is a national basketball team of Macau, administered by the Macau - China Basketball Association. It represents the country in international under-18 women's basketball competitions.

== FIBA Under-18 Women's Asia Cup participations ==
Year	Result
1998	10th
2002	9th
2004	10th

== See also ==
- Macau women's national basketball team
- Macau women's national under-16 basketball team
- Macau men's national under-18 basketball team
