= Macau men's national basketball team =

National men's basketball team

Macau
- FIBA ranking: 147 ▼2 (1 September 2026)
- Joined FIBA: 1979
- FIBA zone: FIBA Asia
- National federation: Macau – China Basketball Association

FIBA Asia Cup
- Appearances: 2 (1983, 1987)
- Medals: None
Home	Away

The Macau national basketball team represents Macau in international basketball competitions and is organized by the Macau - China Basketball Association. (Chinese:中國澳門籃球總會)

While they have not competed in the FIBA World Championship, the team has made two appearances in the FIBA Asia Championship.

On December 21, 2019, after half a century, the Macau men's basketball team finally achieved a long-awaited victory over the Hong Kong national basketball team in the 52nd Hong Kong-Macau Inter-City Basketball Tournament. The match took place at the Taipa Sports Complex in Taipa, where the Macau team hosted the Hong Kong team. In the fourth quarter, Macau staged an astonishing comeback which they went on a 20-0 scoring run, shutting down the Hong Kong team. They ultimately defeated them 73-60, securing the first Hong Kong-Macau Intercity Basketball Championship trophy in Macau sports history.

== Competitions ==
=== FIBA Asia Cup ===
Year	Position	Pld	W	L
(Philippines) 1960	Not a FIBA member			
(Taiwan) 1963	Not a FIBA member			
(Malaysia) 1965	Not a FIBA member			
(South Korea) 1967	Not a FIBA member			
(Thailand) 1969	Not a FIBA member			
(Japan) 1971	Not a FIBA member			
(Philippines) 1973	Not a FIBA member			
(Thailand) 1975	Not a FIBA member			
(Malaysia) 1977	Not a FIBA member			
(Japan) 1979	Not a FIBA member			
(India) 1981	Did not enter			
(Hong Kong) 1983	15th place	5	0	5
(Malaysia) 1985	Did not enter			
(Thailand) 1987	15th place	7	0	7
(China) 1989	Did not enter			
(Japan) 1991	Did not enter			
(Indonesia) 1993	Did not enter			
(South Korea) 1995	Did not enter			
(Saudi Arabia) 1997	Did not enter			
(Japan) 1999	Did not enter			
(China) 2001	Did not enter			
(China) 2003	Did not enter			
(Qatar) 2005	Did not enter			
(Japan) 2007	Did not enter			
(China) 2009	Did not enter			
(China) 2011	Did not enter			
(Philippines) 2013	Did not qualify			
(China) 2015	Did not enter			
(Lebanon) 2017	Did not qualify			
(Indonesia) 2022	Did not qualify			
(Saudi Arabia) 2025	Did not enter			
2029	Did not enter			
Total	2/32	12	0	12

== Team ==
Roster at the FIBA Asia Cup 2021 Pre-Qualifiers (Eastern Region)

Macau National Basketball Team roster
Players
Coaches

Pos.	No.	Name	Age – Date of birth	Height	Club
PG	0	Chi Fong Choi	21 – 4 June 1997	1.75 m (5 ft 9 in)
PF	5	Sio Wa Lei	21 – 8 September 1997	1.90 m (6 ft 3 in)
PF	7	Man Io Tang	21 – 10 April 1997	1.85 m (6 ft 1 in)
PG	12	Wai Hang Kan	30 – 1 October 1988	1.81 m (5 ft 11 in)
SG	15	Chong Kei Kou	23 – 12 February 1995	1.83 m (6 ft 0 in)
SG	17	Wa Chak Sou	21 – 9 September 1997	1.80 m (5 ft 11 in)
C	21	Fong Iam Hoi	21 – 1 August 1997	1.91 m (6 ft 3 in)
SG	26	Kei Long Ieong	20 – 6 February 1998	1.85 m (6 ft 1 in)
C	66	Wai Hou Lam	27 – 12 March 1991	1.95 m (6 ft 5 in)
PF	77	Iek Nam Choi	25 – 18 July 1993	1.85 m (6 ft 1 in)
PG	82	Teng Long Lam	25 – 5 November 1993	1.80 m (5 ft 11 in)
PF	93	Hip Meng Lo	25 – 28 August 1993	1.85 m (6 ft 1 in)

Head coach

Legend

- (C) Team captain
- Club field describes current pro club

== Past rosters ==
Roster at the 2017 EABA Championship:

Macau National Basketball Team roster
Players
Coaches

Pos.	No.	Name	Age – Date of birth	Height	Club
G	4	Man Lok Chan	20 – 23 October 1996
	5	Wang Ip Wu	20 – 8 May 1997
F	6	Man Io Tang	20 – 10 April 1997	1.85 m (6 ft 1 in)
F/C	8	Kam Chi Un	24 – 24 March 1993	2.00 m (6 ft 7 in)
F	9	Hip Meng Lo	23 – 28 August 1993	1.85 m (6 ft 1 in)
C	10	Ka Tong Lai	21 – 25 October 1995	1.89 m (6 ft 2 in)
C	11	Fong Iam Hoi	19 – 1 August 1997	1.91 m (6 ft 3 in)
	12	Wai Seng Chan	19 – 6 June 1998
G	13	Teng Long Lam	23 – 5 November 1993	1.80 m (5 ft 11 in)
PG	14	Ka Kin Iong	30 – 31 March 1987	1.70 m (5 ft 7 in)

Head coach

Legend

- (C) Team captain
- Club field describes current pro club

Roster at the 2014 Lusophony Games:

Macau National Basketball Team roster
Players
Coaches

Pos.	No.	Name	Age – Date of birth	Height	Club
PG	04	Wheymz Tagura	21 – 20 March 1992	1.72 m (5 ft 8 in)
PG	05	Chi Hou Sou	20 – 8 June 1993	1.76 m (5 ft 9 in)
SF	06	Hip Meng Lo	20 – 28 August 1993	1.85 m (6 ft 1 in)
PG	07	Chi Seng Leong	29 – 4 January 1985	1.76 m (5 ft 9 in)
F	08	Alves Dos Santos	37 – 6 May 1976	1.92 m (6 ft 4 in)
PG	09	Ka Kin Iong	26 – 31 March 1987	1.70 m (5 ft 7 in)
C	10	Kam Chi Un	20 – 24 March 1993	2.00 m (6 ft 7 in)
G	12	Wai Hang Kan	25 – 1 October 1988	1.80 m (5 ft 11 in)
G	13	Ngai San Iong	17 – 9 February 1996	1.79 m (5 ft 10 in)
C	15	Ka Tong Lai	18 – 25 October 1995	1.89 m (6 ft 2 in)
PG	29	Tong Fai Cheong	21 – 2 January 1993	1.90 m (6 ft 3 in)
SG	30	Kuok Wai Chang	27 – 12 December 1986	1.84 m (6 ft 0 in)

Head coach

- (China) Li Jin

Legend

- (C) Team captain
- Club field describes current pro club

Team in 2013:

Macau National Basketball Team roster
Players
Coaches

Pos.	No.	Name	Age – Date of birth	Height	Club
SG	04	Fu In Lao	–	1.78 m (5 ft 10 in)	cheng ju lu	(Macau)
PG	05	Chi San Wong	–	1.75 m (5 ft 9 in)	Iao Cheng	(Macau)
SF	08	Hip Meng Lo	–	1.85 m (6 ft 1 in)	Iu Yeung	(Macau)
PG	09	Ka Kin Iong	–	1.70 m (5 ft 7 in)	Iao Cheng	(Macau)
	10	Check Wa Chan	–		Fukien AC	(Hong Kong)
PG	11	Tong Fai Cheong	–	1.90 m (6 ft 3 in)	Iao Cheng	(Macau)
	12	Wai Hang Kan	–		Fukien AC	(Hong Kong)
	13	Ka Seng Wu	–		Fukien AC	(Hong Kong)
	14	Kam Chi Un	–		Iu Yeung	(Macau)
C	15	Ka Tong Lai	–	1.91 m (6 ft 3 in)	Iu Yeung	(Macau)

Head coach

- (China) Li Jin

Legend

- (C) Team captain
- Club field describes current pro club

== See also ==
- Sports in Macau
- Macau national under-19 basketball team
- Macau women's national basketball team
