= 1997 ABC Championship for Women =

1997 FIBA Women's Asia Cup
17th Asian Women's Basketball Championship

Tournament details
- Host country: Thailand
- Dates: April 27 – May 5
- Teams: 14 (from 44 federations)
- Venue: 1 (in 1 host city)

Final positions
- Champions: South Korea (10th title)

Tournament statistics
- MVP: (South Korea) Yoo Young-Joo

The 1997 ABC Championship for Women is the qualifying tournament for 1998 FIBA World Championship for Women. The tournament was held on Bangkok, Thailand from April 27 to May 5. The championship is divided into two levels: Level I and Level II. The last finisher of Level I is relegated to Level II and the top finisher of Level II qualify for Level I 1999's championship.

== Participating teams ==
Level I	Level II – Group A	Level II – Group B
China; South Korea; Japan; Chinese Taipei; Kyrgyzstan; Thailand	Kazakhstan; Indonesia; India; Singapore	Hong Kong; Malaysia; Macau; Sri Lanka

== Preliminary round ==
=== Level I ===
Team	Pld	W	L	PF	PA	PD	Pts
South Korea	5	5	0	410	343	+67	10
China	5	4	1	465	340	+125	9
Japan	5	3	2	445	351	+94	8
Chinese Taipei	5	2	3	392	423	−31	7
Thailand	5	1	4	327	462	−135	6
Kyrgyzstan	5	0	5	350	470	−120	5

April 27

Chinese Taipei	76–88	South Korea
Scoring by half: 41–49, 35–39

Nimibutr Gymnasium, Bangkok

April 27

Thailand	83–79	Kyrgyzstan
Scoring by half: 48–42, 35–37

Nimibutr Gymnasium, Bangkok

April 27

China	97–77	Japan
Scoring by half: 46–33, 51–44

Nimibutr Gymnasium, Bangkok

April 28

Kyrgyzstan	61–100	China
Scoring by half: 30–55, 31–45

Nimibutr Gymnasium, Bangkok

April 28

Chinese Taipei	100–64	Thailand
Scoring by half: 50–39, 50–25

Nimibutr Gymnasium, Bangkok

April 28

South Korea	73–71	Japan
Scoring by half: 44–34, 29–37

Nimibutr Gymnasium, Bangkok

April 29

Chinese Taipei	90–74	Kyrgyzstan
Scoring by half: 40–34, 50–40

Nimibutr Gymnasium, Bangkok

April 29

Thailand	41–88	Japan
Scoring by half: 19–44, 22–44

Nimibutr Gymnasium, Bangkok

April 29

China	65–72	South Korea
Scoring by half: 36–38, 29–34

Nimibutr Gymnasium, Bangkok

May 1

Chinese Taipei	62–103	China
Scoring by half: 43–57, 19–46

Nimibutr Gymnasium, Bangkok

May 1

Japan	115–76	Kyrgyzstan
Scoring by half: 57–37, 58–39

Nimibutr Gymnasium, Bangkok

May 1

South Korea	95–71	Thailand
Scoring by half: 56–32, 39–39

Nimibutr Gymnasium, Bangkok

May 2

South Korea	82–60	Kyrgyzstan
Scoring by half: 46–29, 36–31

Nimibutr Gymnasium, Bangkok

May 2

Thailand	68–100	China
Scoring by half: 34–53, 34–47

Nimibutr Gymnasium, Bangkok

May 2

Japan	94–64	Chinese Taipei
Scoring by half: 43–33, 51–31

Nimibutr Gymnasium, Bangkok

=== Level II – Group A ===
Team	Pld	W	L	PF	PA	PD	Pts
Kazakhstan	3	3	0	234	148	+86	6
India	3	2	1	224	156	+68	5
Indonesia	3	1	2	167	212	−45	4
Singapore	3	0	3	123	232	−109	3

April 27

Kazakhstan	66–54	India
Scoring by half: 34–25, 32–29

Nimibutr Gymnasium, Bangkok

April 28

Singapore	36–87	Kazakhstan
Scoring by half: 14–40, 22–47

Nimibutr Gymnasium, Bangkok

April 29

India	86–48	Indonesia
Scoring by half: 44–18, 42–30

Nimibutr Gymnasium, Bangkok

April 30

Indonesia	58–81	Kazakhstan
Scoring by half: 31–39, 27–42

Nimibutr Gymnasium, Bangkok

May 1

India	84–42	Singapore
Scoring by half: 51–16, 33–26

Nimibutr Gymnasium, Bangkok

May 2

Singapore	45–61	Indonesia
Scoring by half: 20–24, 25–37

Nimibutr Gymnasium, Bangkok

=== Level II – Group B ===
Team	Pld	W	L	PF	PA	PD	Pts
Malaysia	3	3	0	243	112	+131	6
Hong Kong	3	2	1	213	132	+81	5
Sri Lanka	3	1	2	113	206	−93	4
Macau	3	0	3	119	238	−119	3

April 27

Hong Kong	82–36	Sri Lanka
Scoring by half: 48–14, 34–22

Nimibutr Gymnasium, Bangkok

April 28

Macau	32–86	Hong Kong
Scoring by half: 13–51, 19–35

Nimibutr Gymnasium, Bangkok

April 29

Sri Lanka	24–80	Malaysia
Scoring by half: 20–40, 4–40

Nimibutr Gymnasium, Bangkok

April 30

Malaysia	64–45	Hong Kong
Scoring by half: 35–24, 29–21

Nimibutr Gymnasium, Bangkok

May 1

Sri Lanka	53–44	Macau
Scoring by half: 30–20, 23–24

Nimibutr Gymnasium, Bangkok

May 2

Macau	43–99	Malaysia
Scoring by half: 20–55, 23–44

Nimibutr Gymnasium, Bangkok

== Classification 7th–14th ==
=== 13th place ===
May 4

Singapore	77–49	Macau
Scoring by half: 35–25, 42–24

Nimibutr Gymnasium, Bangkok

=== 11th place ===
May 4

Indonesia	61–29	Sri Lanka
Scoring by half: 27–15, 34–14

Nimibutr Gymnasium, Bangkok

=== 9th place ===
May 5

India	69–60	Hong Kong
Scoring by half: 38–27, 31–33

Nimibutr Gymnasium, Bangkok

=== 7th place ===
May 5

Kazakhstan	62–45	Malaysia
Scoring by half: 27–18, 35–27

Nimibutr Gymnasium, Bangkok

== Final round ==
Semifinals
May 4
China	77
Japan	90
May 4
South Korea	92
Chinese Taipei	77

Final
May 5
Japan	61
South Korea	74
3rd place
May 5
China	101
Chinese Taipei	63

=== Semifinals ===
May 4

China	77–90	Japan
Scoring by half: 39–48, 38–42

Nimibutr Gymnasium, Bangkok

May 4

South Korea	92–77	Chinese Taipei
Scoring by half: 56–43, 36–34

Nimibutr Gymnasium, Bangkok

=== 3rd place ===
May 5

China	101–63	Chinese Taipei
Scoring by half: 59–28, 42–35

Nimibutr Gymnasium, Bangkok

=== Final ===
May 5

Japan	61–74	South Korea
Scoring by half: 38–43, 23–31

Nimibutr Gymnasium, Bangkok

== Final standing ==
Qualified for the 1998 FIBA World Championship for Women

Rank	Team	Record
1st place, gold medalist(s)	South Korea	7–0
2nd place, silver medalist(s)	Japan	4–3
3rd place, bronze medalist(s)	China	5–2
4	Chinese Taipei	2–5
5	Thailand	1–4
6	Kyrgyzstan	0–5
7	Kazakhstan	4–0
8	Malaysia	3–1
9	India	3–1
10	Hong Kong	2–2
11	Indonesia	2–2
12	Sri Lanka	1–3
13	Singapore	1–3
14	Macau	0–4

== Awards ==
1997 Asian champions

South Korea
Tenth title

- Most Valuable Player: (South Korea) Yoo Young-Joo
