= Franklim Furtado =

Bissau-Guinean basketball player

Academia do Lumiar Lisboa
- Position: Power forward
- League: Proliga (Portugal)

Personal information
- Born: October 21, 1987 (age 39) Bissau, Guinea-Bissau
- Listed height: 6 ft 6 in (1.98 m)

Career information
- Playing career: 2008–present

Career history
- 2016-17: Academia do Lumiar Lisboa (Portugal)

Franklim Balde Capristano Furtado (born October 21, 1987) is a Bissau-Guinean professional basketball player, currently with Academia do Lumiar Lisboa of the Proliga (Portugal).

He represented Guinea-Bissau's national basketball team at the FIBA Africa Championship 2011 qualification.
