= Yu Ki-sang =

South Korean basketball player

Yoo Ki-sang
Changwon LG Sakers
- Position: Guard
- League: KBL

Personal information
- Born: 17 April 2001 (age 25) Seoul, South Korea
- Listed height: 1.88 m (6 ft 2 in)

Career information
- College: Yonsei University
- Playing career: 2023–present

Career history
- 2023–present: Changwon LG

Career highlights
- KBL 2024 Rookie of the Year; KBL All-Star (2025, via fan & team vote)

Yoo Ki-sang (Korean: 유기상; born 17 April 2001) is a South Korean professional basketball player who plays as a guard for the Changwon LG Sakers in the KBL.

== Professional career ==
In the 2024–25 season, Yoo earned the top spot in both fan and team voting for the Korean Basketball League All-Star Game—an achievement no Changwon LG player had previously attained.

== International career ==
Yoo has represented the South Korea national team in continental competitions. At the FIBA Asia Cup 2025 Qualifiers, he averaged 9.5 points, 2.5 rebounds, and 1.0 assists, reflecting a promising start to his international journey.

During the 2025 FIBA Asia Cup, Yoo elevated his performance, averaging 18.3 points per game, making him among the top scorers of the tournament. He showed particularly explosive shooting, including an 8-of-12 performance from beyond the arc in a game against Lebanon.

== Career statistics ==
Competition	Year	PPG	RPG	APG
FIBA Asia Cup Qualifiers	2025	9.5	2.5	1.0
FIBA Asia Cup	2025	18.3	—	—
KBL (2023–24 season)	2023–24	8.1	2.2	—
