= 2004 FIBA Asia Under-18 Championship for Women =

2004 FIBA U18 Women's Asia Cup
17th FIBA Under-18 Women's Asian Basketball Championship

Tournament details
- Host country: China
- Dates: October 15–21
- Teams: 10 (from 44 federations)
- Venue: 1 (in 1 host city)

Final positions
- Champions: China (10th title)

ABC Under-18 Championship for Women 2004 is the 17th edition of ABC's basketball championship for females under 18 years old. The games were held at Shenzhen, China.

The championship is divided into two levels: Level I and Level II. The last finishers of Level I are relegated to Level II and the top finisher of Level II qualify for Level I 2007's championship.

== Participating teams ==
Level I	Level II
China; Chinese Taipei; South Korea; Japan; Thailand	Malaysia; India; Philippines; Singapore; Macau

== Preliminary round ==
=== Level I ===
Team	Pld	W	L	PF	PA	PD	Pts
China	4	4	0	394	200	+194	8
South Korea	4	3	1	327	298	+29	7
Chinese Taipei	4	2	2	280	296	−16	6
Japan	4	1	3	248	289	−41	5
Thailand	4	0	4	191	357	−166	4

October 15
18:30

China	111–25	Thailand

Bao'an Stadium, Shenzhen

October 15
20:30

South Korea	73–65	Japan
Scoring by quarter: 30–20, 17–11, 6–22, 20–12

Bao'an Stadium, Shenzhen

October 16
18:30

Thailand	36–82	Japan
Scoring by quarter: 6–19, 10–15, 9–20, 11–28

Bao'an Stadium, Shenzhen

October 16
20:30

South Korea	96–75	Chinese Taipei

Bao'an Stadium, Shenzhen

October 17
18:30

Japan	47–109	China
Scoring by quarter: 19–34, 10–28, 7–20, 11–27

Bao'an Stadium, Shenzhen

October 17
20:30

Thailand	68–86	Chinese Taipei

Bao'an Stadium, Shenzhen

October 18
18:30

China	96–80	South Korea

Bao'an Stadium, Shenzhen

October 18
20:30

Chinese Taipei	71–54	Japan
Scoring by quarter: 23–13, 12–12, 17–18, 19–11

Bao'an Stadium, Shenzhen

October 19
18:30

China	78–48	Chinese Taipei

Bao'an Stadium, Shenzhen

October 19
20:30

South Korea	78–62	Thailand

Bao'an Stadium, Shenzhen

=== Level II ===
Team	Pld	W	L	PF	PA	PD	Pts
Singapore	4	4	0	306	169	+137	8
Malaysia	4	3	1	286	231	+55	7
India	4	2	2	289	203	+86	6
Philippines	4	1	3	203	279	−76	5
Macau	4	0	4	127	329	−202	4

October 15
14:30

Macau	37–69	Philippines

Bao'an Stadium, Shenzhen

October 15
16:30

Singapore	69–56	India

Bao'an Stadium, Shenzhen

October 16
14:30

Malaysia	46–89	Singapore

Bao'an Stadium, Shenzhen

October 16
16:30

India	97–37	Macau

Bao'an Stadium, Shenzhen

October 17
14:30

Singapore	77–16	Macau

Bao'an Stadium, Shenzhen

October 17
16:30

Philippines	50–90	Malaysia

Bao'an Stadium, Shenzhen

October 18
14:30

Philippines	33–81	India

Bao'an Stadium, Shenzhen

October 18
16:30

Malaysia	86–37	Macau

Bao'an Stadium, Shenzhen

October 19
14:30

Philippines	51–71	Singapore

Bao'an Stadium, Shenzhen

October 19
16:30

Malaysia	64–55	India

Bao'an Stadium, Shenzhen

== Final round ==
Semifinals
October 20
China	89
Japan	51
October 20
South Korea	96
Chinese Taipei	79

Final
October 21
China	102
South Korea	79
3rd place
October 21
Japan	57
Chinese Taipei	52

=== Semifinals ===
October 20
19:00

China	89–51	Japan
Scoring by quarter: 30–11, 23–8, 21–20, 15–12

Bao'an Stadium, Shenzhen

October 20
21:00

South Korea	96–79	Chinese Taipei

Bao'an Stadium, Shenzhen

=== 3rd place ===
February 5
18:00

Japan	57–52	Chinese Taipei
Scoring by quarter: 8–11, 20–19, 21–14, 8–8

Bao'an Stadium, Shenzhen

=== Final ===
February 5
20:00

China	102–79	South Korea

Bao'an Stadium, Shenzhen

== Final standing ==
Qualified for the 2005 FIBA Under-19 World Championship for Women

Rank	Team	Record
1st place, gold medalist(s)	China	6–0
2nd place, silver medalist(s)	South Korea	4–2
3rd place, bronze medalist(s)	Japan	2–4
4	Chinese Taipei	2–4
5	Thailand	0–4
6	Singapore	4–0
7	Malaysia	3–1
8	India	2–2
9	Philippines	1–3
10	Macau	0–4

== Awards ==
2004 Asian Under-18 champions

China
Tenth title
