= Academia do Lumiar =

Basketball team in Lisbon, Portugal

- Leagues: Proliga (Portugal)
- Founded: 1893
- Location: Lisbon, Portugal

Academia do Lumiar is a Portuguese professional basketball team located in Lumiar, Lisbon municipality, Portugal. The team competes in the Proliga (Portugal).

== Notable players ==
To appear in this section a player must have either:

- Set a club record or won an individual award as a professional player.
- Played at least one official international match for his senior national team or one NBA game at any time.

- (Cape Verde) Denis Neves
- (Guinea-Bissau) Franklim Furtado
