= Jaylin Galloway =

Australian-American basketball player (born 2002)

No. 6 – Cairns Taipans
- Position: Small forward
- League: NBL

Personal information
- Born: 21 December 2002 (age 23) Townsville, Queensland, Australia
- Listed height: 197 cm (6 ft 6 in)
- Listed weight: 92 kg (203 lb)

Career information
- High school: Sprayberry (Marietta, Georgia, U.S.)
- NBA draft: 2022: undrafted
- Playing career: 2020–present

Career history
- 2020–2026: Sydney Kings
- 2022: Mackay Meteors
- 2023: Ipswich Force
- 2024: Wisconsin Herd
- 2025: Bankstown Bruins
- 2026: Vaqueros de Bayamón
- 2026–present: Cairns Taipans

Career highlights
- 3× NBL champion (2022, 2023, 2026); FIBA Asia Cup MVP (2025); FIBA Asia Cup All-Star Team (2025); NBL1 North champion (2023)
- Stats at NBA.com
- Stats at Basketball Reference
Medals
Men's basketball
Representing Australia
FIBA Asia Cup
Gold medal – first place	2025 Saudi Arabia

Jaylin Galloway (born 21 December 2002) is an Australian-American professional basketball player for the Cairns Taipans of the National Basketball League (NBL). Between 2020 and 2026, he played for the Sydney Kings of the NBL and won three NBL championships. Galloway also plays for the Australia national team and led them to the 2025 FIBA Asia Cup title.

== Early life ==
Galloway was born in Townsville, Queensland, Australia, to an Australian mother and an American father. His mother was playing in the WNBL for the Townsville Fire. The family later moved to the U.S., where he grew up playing basketball in Atlanta, Georgia. He attended Sprayberry High School in Marietta, Georgia, and helped the basketball team reach the regional championship.

== Professional career ==
=== Sydney Kings / Mackay Meteors / Ipswich Force (2020–2024) ===
Galloway began his professional career immediately after high school, rather than attending college. He moved to Australia and joined the Sydney Kings of the National Basketball League (NBL) as a development player for the 2020–21 season, appearing in eight games while scoring two points. He returned as a development player for the 2021–22 season and scored 13 points in 14 games while helping the team win the NBL championship. He played for the Mackay Meteors of NBL1 North during the 2022 NBL1 season, joining his brother, Kyrin.

Galloway was eligible to be selected in the 2022 NBA draft but was not chosen.

Galloway was part of the full roster for the Kings in the 2022–23 season and helped them repeat as NBL champions, averaging 5.1 points and 1.8 rebounds per game. After the season, he played for the Ipswich Force along with his brother during the 2023 NBL1 season, averaging 18.1 points and 5.4 rebounds per game while helping the team win the NBL1 North championship over the Gold Coast Rollers. He signed a three-year contract extension with the Kings in March 2023 and, after briefly joining the Minnesota Timberwolves for the 2023 NBA Summer League, he played 23 games in the 2023–24 NBL season for the Kings, averaging 10.3 points and 3.4 rebounds in 22.3 minutes a game.

=== Wisconsin Herd (2024) ===
On 3 March 2024, after the Kings' season ended, Galloway signed a two-way contract with the Milwaukee Bucks of the National Basketball Association (NBA). He appeared in seven games for the Wisconsin Herd of the NBA G League to finish the 2023–24 season. He was waived by the Bucks on 1 August, without having appeared in an NBA game.

=== Return to Sydney (2024–2026) ===
On 26 August 2024, Galloway signed a three-year deal to return to the Sydney Kings. On 2 November 2024, he was ruled out indefinitely with a shoulder injury. After undergoing surgery, he was ruled out for the rest of the 2024–25 NBL season on 20 November.

Galloway joined the Bankstown Bruins of the NBL1 East for the 2025 season.

In the 2025–26 NBL season, Galloway established himself as one of Brian Goorjian's key two-way players on the wing. Following the NBL season, he joined Vaqueros de Bayamón of the Baloncesto Superior Nacional for the 2026 season alongside Kings teammate Xavier Cooks. On 12 May, Galloway scored a season-high 26 points in a win against the Criollos de Caguas. In 15 BSN games, he averaged 13.4 points, 2.0 rebounds and 2.2 assists per game.

On 12 August 2026, Galloway and the Kings agreed to a mutual release of his contract.

=== Cairns Taipans (2026–present) ===
On 15 August 2026, Galloway signed with the Cairns Taipans for the 2026–27 NBL season, reuniting him with his older brother Kyrin. He missed the first eight games of the season due to recovering from shoulder surgery. He returned briefly but soon sustained a low-grade spinal compression fracture, where on 4 November 2026 he was ruled him out for approximately eight weeks.

== National team career ==
Galloway played for the Australia men's national under-19 basketball team at the 2021 FIBA Under-19 Basketball World Cup. He made his senior debut for the Australian national team in February 2022 during a FIBA Asia Cup qualifying game against Taiwan.

In July 2025, Galloway was named in the Boomers squad in the lead-up to the 2025 FIBA Asia Cup in Saudi Arabia. He scored 23 points for the Boomers in the final against China to win the title. He was subsequently named the Asia Cup MVP, following his averages of 14.2 points per game.

In October 2025, Galloway was named in the Boomers squad for the first window of the FIBA Basketball World Cup 2027 Asian Qualifiers.

== Personal life ==
Galloway has an American father, Erin, and an Australian mother, Kylie (née Page). Both his parents played basketball collegiately at the University of Hawaii, after his mother transferred from San Jose State. Galloway's brother, Kyrin, is also a basketball player.
