= Basketball at the Lusofonia Games =

Sporting competition

Basketball at the Lusophone Games was first held in the first edition in Macau, in 2006.

== Men's tournament ==
Lusophone Games
Year	Host	Winner	Runner-up	3rd Place
2006; Details	Macau, China	Portugal	Angola	Cape Verde
2009; Details	Lisbon, Portugal	Angola	Cape Verde	Portugal
2014; Details	Goa, India	India	Angola	Mozambique

== Women's tournament ==
Lusophone Games
Year	Host	Winner	Runner-up	3rd Place
2006; Details	Macau, China	Mozambique	Portugal	Cape Verde
2009; Details	Lisbon, Portugal	Portugal	Brazil	Angola
2014; Details	Goa, India	Mozambique	Angola	India
