= 1995 ABC Under-18 Championship =

1995 FIBA U18 Asia Cup
13th FIBA Under-18 Asian Basketball Championship

Tournament details
- Host country: Philippines
- Dates: March 3–11
- Teams: 15 (from 44 federations)
- Venues: 2 (in 1 host city)

Final positions
- Champions: South Korea (2nd title)

The ABC Under-18 Championship 1995 is the 13th edition of the ABC's junior championship for basketball. The games were held at Manila, Philippines from March 3–11, 1995.

== Preliminary round ==
=== Group A ===
Team	Pld	W	L	PF	PA	PD	Pts
China	3	3	0	304	113	+191	6
Thailand	3	2	1	212	197	+15	5
Malaysia	3	1	2	210	195	+15	4
Brunei	3	0	3	101	322	−221	3

March 3

China	91–44	Thailand
Scoring by half: 46–18, 45–26

Ninoy Aquino Stadium, Manila

March 3

Brunei	35–101	Malaysia
Scoring by half: 18–54, 17–47

Rizal Memorial Coliseum, Manila

March 4

Malaysia	43–85	China
Scoring by half: 21–41, 22–44

Ninoy Aquino Stadium, Manila

March 4

Thailand	93–40	Brunei
Scoring by half: 40–23, 53–17

Rizal Memorial Coliseum, Manila

March 5

Malaysia	66–75	Thailand
Scoring by half: 28–40, 38–35

Rizal Memorial Coliseum, Manila

March 5

China	128–26	Brunei
Scoring by half: 69–17, 59–9

Ninoy Aquino Stadium, Manila

=== Group B ===
Team	Pld	W	L	PF	PA	PD	Pts
South Korea	3	3	0	262	151	+111	6
Jordan	3	2	1	220	134	+86	5
Singapore	3	1	2	133	236	−103	4
Hong Kong	3	0	3	112	206	−94	3

March 3

South Korea	101–49	Singapore
Scoring by half: 56–15, 45–34

Ninoy Aquino Stadium, Manila

March 3

Jordan	71–24	Hong Kong
Scoring by half: 34–11, 37–13

Rizal Memorial Coliseum, Manila

March 4

Hong Kong	41–86	South Korea
Scoring by half: 23–45, 18–41

Ninoy Aquino Stadium, Manila

March 4

Singapore	35–88	Jordan
Scoring by half: 20–43, 15–45

Rizal Memorial Coliseum, Manila

March 5

South Korea	75–61	Jordan
Scoring by half: 41–31, 34–30

Ninoy Aquino Stadium, Manila

March 5

Hong Kong	47–49	Singapore
Scoring by half: 26–28, 21–21

Rizal Memorial Coliseum, Manila

=== Group C ===
Team	Pld	W	L	PF	PA	PD	Pts
Philippines	2	2	0	233	79	+154	4
Indonesia	2	1	1	119	149	−30	3
Macau	2	0	2	75	199	−124	2

March 3

Philippines	132–27	Macau
Scoring by half: 73–14, 59–13

Ninoy Aquino Stadium, Manila

March 4

Indonesia	67–48	Macau
Scoring by half: 35–24, 32–24

Ninoy Aquino Stadium, Manila

March 5

Philippines	101–52	Indonesia
Scoring by half: 50–33, 51–19

Ninoy Aquino Stadium, Manila

=== Group D ===
Team	Pld	W	L	PF	PA	PD	Pts
Chinese Taipei	3	3	0	251	205	+46	6
Japan	3	2	1	208	195	+13	5
Kazakhstan	3	1	2	226	220	+6	4
India	3	0	3	190	255	−65	3

March 3

Chinese Taipei	87–75	Kazakhstan
Scoring by half: 45–45, 42–30

Rizal Memorial Coliseum, Manila

March 3

Japan	74–61	India
Scoring by half: 34–27, 40–34

Ninoy Aquino Stadium, Manila

March 4

Kazakhstan	62–72	Japan
Scoring by half: 40–29, 22–43

Ninoy Aquino Stadium, Manila

March 4

India	68–92	Chinese Taipei
Scoring by half: 24–50, 44–42

Rizal Memorial Coliseum, Manila

March 5

Japan	62–72	Chinese Taipei
Scoring by half: 34–38, 28–34

Ninoy Aquino Stadium, Manila

March 5

Kazakhstan	89–61	India
Scoring by half: 46–21, 43–40

Rizal Memorial Coliseum, Manila

== Quarterfinal round ==
=== Group I ===
Team	Pld	W	L	PF	PA	PD	Pts
China	3	3	0	251	169	+82	6
Jordan	3	2	1	194	215	−21	5
Philippines	3	1	2	236	232	+4	4
Japan	3	0	3	184	249	−65	3

March 6
18:00

Jordan	72–71	Philippines
Scoring by half: 36–40, 36–31

Ninoy Aquino Stadium, Manila

March 6
20:00

Japan	53–78	China
Scoring by half: 26–45, 27–33

Ninoy Aquino Stadium, Manila

March 7
14:00

China	88–49	Jordan
Scoring by half: 48–13, 40–36

Ninoy Aquino Stadium, Manila

March 7
18:00

Philippines	98–75	Japan
Scoring by half: 33–41, 65–34

Ninoy Aquino Stadium, Manila

March 8
14:00

Jordan	73–56	Japan
Scoring by half: 30–11, 43–45

Ninoy Aquino Stadium, Manila

March 8
18:00

China	85–67	Philippines
Scoring by half: 52–26, 33–41

Ninoy Aquino Stadium, Manila

=== Group II ===
Team	Pld	W	L	PF	PA	PD	Pts
South Korea	3	3	0	219	150	+69	6
Thailand	3	2	1	184	179	+5	5
Chinese Taipei	3	1	2	202	203	−1	4
Indonesia	3	0	3	153	226	−73	3

March 6
14:00

South Korea	64–57	Thailand
Scoring by half: 35–30, 29–27

Ninoy Aquino Stadium, Manila

March 6
16:00

Chinese Taipei	80–67	Indonesia
Scoring by half: 41–25, 39–42

Ninoy Aquino Stadium, Manila

March 7
16:00

Indonesia	37–86	South Korea
Scoring by half: 20–40, 17–46

Ninoy Aquino Stadium, Manila

March 7
20:00

Thailand	67–66	Chinese Taipei
Scoring by half: 36–35, 31–31

Ninoy Aquino Stadium, Manila

March 8
16:00

Thailand	60–49	Indonesia
Scoring by half: 33–18, 27–31

Ninoy Aquino Stadium, Manila

March 8
20:00

South Korea	69–56	Chinese Taipei
Scoring by half: 38–37, 31–19

Ninoy Aquino Stadium, Manila

=== Group III ===
Team	Pld	W	L	PF	PA	PD	Pts
India	3	3	0	308	161	+147	6
Malaysia	3	2	1	189	191	−2	5
Hong Kong	3	1	2	156	181	−25	4
Macau	3	0	3	129	249	−120	3

March 6
14:00

Malaysia	48–39	Hong Kong
Scoring by half: 28–28, 20–11

Rizal Memorial Coliseum, Manila

March 6
16:00

Macau	33–119	India
Scoring by half: 19–60, 14–59

Rizal Memorial Coliseum, Manila

March 7
14:00

India	102–67	Malaysia
Scoring by half: 51–28, 51–39

Rizal Memorial Coliseum, Manila

March 7
16:00

Hong Kong	56–46	Macau
Scoring by half: 31–23, 25–23

Rizal Memorial Coliseum, Manila

March 8
14:00

Malaysia	74–50	Macau
Scoring by half: 43–13, 31–37

Rizal Memorial Coliseum, Manila

March 8
16:00

Hong Kong	61–87	India
Scoring by half: 28–46, 33–41

Rizal Memorial Coliseum, Manila

=== Group IV ===
Team	Pld	W	L	PF	PA	PD	Pts
Kazakhstan	2	2	0	202	91	+111	4
Singapore	2	1	1	138	148	−10	3
Brunei	2	0	2	100	201	−101	2

March 6
18:00

Brunei	56–91	Singapore
Scoring by half: 36–52, 20–39

Rizal Memorial Coliseum, Manila

March 7
18:00

Kazakhstan	110–44	Brunei
Scoring by half: 59–16, 51–28

Rizal Memorial Coliseum, Manila

March 8
18:00

Singapore	47–92	Kazakhstan
Scoring by half: 21–50, 26–42

Rizal Memorial Coliseum, Manila

== Classification 13th–15th ==
Semifinals
March 10
Macau
Bye
March 10
Hong Kong	78
Brunei	47

13th place
March 11
Bye
Hong Kong
15th place
March 11
Macau	74
Brunei	58

=== Semifinals ===
March 10
14:00

Hong Kong	78–47	Brunei
Scoring by half: 47–23, 31–24

Rizal Memorial Coliseum, Manila

=== 14th place ===
March 11
14:00

Macau	74–58	Brunei
Scoring by half: 38–25, 36–33

Rizal Memorial Coliseum, Manila

== Classification 9th–12th ==
Semifinals
March 10
India	89
Singapore	73
March 10
Malaysia	50
Kazakhstan	91

9th place
March 11
India	20
Kazakhstan	0
11th place
March 11
Singapore	48
Malaysia	71

=== Semifinals ===
March 10
16:00

India	89–73	Singapore
Scoring by half: 41–37, 48–36

Rizal Memorial Coliseum, Manila

March 10
18:00

Malaysia	50–91	Kazakhstan
Scoring by half: 30–43, 20–48

Rizal Memorial Coliseum, Manila

=== 11th place ===
March 11
16:00

Singapore	48–71	Malaysia
Scoring by half: 25–46, 23–25

Rizal Memorial Coliseum, Manila

=== 9th place ===
March 11
18:00

India	20–0	Kazakhstan
Walkover

Rizal Memorial Coliseum, Manila

== Classification 5th–8th ==
Semifinals
March 10
Philippines	91
Indonesia	53
March 10
Japan	60
Chinese Taipei	70

5th place
March 11
Philippines	81
Chinese Taipei	85
7th place
March 11
Indonesia	48
Japan	66

=== Semifinals ===
March 10
14:00

Philippines	91–53	Indonesia
Scoring by half: 41–21, 50–32

Ninoy Aquino Stadium, Manila

March 10
16:00

Japan	60–70	Chinese Taipei
Scoring by half: 30–31, 30–39

Ninoy Aquino Stadium, Manila

=== 7th place ===
March 11
13:00

Indonesia	48–66	Japan
Scoring by half: 20–34, 28–32

Ninoy Aquino Stadium, Manila

=== 5th place ===
March 11
17:00

Philippines	81–85	Chinese Taipei
Scoring by half: 40–37, 41–48

Ninoy Aquino Stadium, Manila

== Final round ==
Semifinals
March 10
China	98
Thailand	45
March 10
Jordan	51
South Korea	69

Final
March 11
China	48
South Korea	55
3rd place
March 11
Thailand	56
Jordan	62

=== Semifinals ===
March 10
18:00

China	98–45	Thailand
Scoring by half: 49–25, 49–21

Ninoy Aquino Stadium, Manila

March 10
20:00

Jordan	51–69	South Korea
Scoring by half: 27–28, 24–41

Ninoy Aquino Stadium, Manila

=== 3rd place ===
March 11
15:00

Thailand	56–62	Jordan
Scoring by half: 23–26, 33–36

Ninoy Aquino Stadium, Manila

=== Final ===
March 11
19:00

China	48–55	South Korea
Scoring by half: 25–25, 23–30

Ninoy Aquino Stadium, Manila

== Final standing ==
Qualified for the 1995 FIBA Under-19 World Championship

Rank	Team	Record
1st place, gold medalist(s)	South Korea	8–0
2nd place, silver medalist(s)	China	7–1
3rd place, bronze medalist(s)	Jordan	5–3
4	Thailand	4–4
5	Chinese Taipei	6–2
6	Philippines	4–3
7	Japan	3–5
8	Indonesia	1–6
9	India	5–3
10	Kazakhstan	4–3
11	Malaysia	4–4
12	Singapore	2–5
13	Hong Kong	2–5
14	Macau	1–5
15	Brunei	0–7

== Awards ==
1995 Asian Under-18 champions

South Korea
Second title

Mythical Five

- Wang Zhizhi
- Zhu Dong
- Zaid Al-Khas
- Cho Woo-hyun
- Joseph Gumatay
