= Basketball at the 2014 Lusofonia Games – Men's tournament =

Basketball tournament

Basketball at the 2014 Lusophony Games Men's Tournament
Tournament details
- Host country: India
- Dates: 23–27 January 2014
- Teams: 6
- Venue(s): 1 (in 1 host city)

Final positions
- Champions: India (1st title)

Official website
- Basketball at the 2014 Lusophony Games

The Men's Basketball Tournament at the 2014 Lusophony Games was the 3rd Lusophony Games basketball tournament, played under the rules of FIBA, the world governing body for basketball. The tournament was hosted by India from 23 to 27 January 2014.

India ended the round-robin tournament with a 4–0 unbeaten record to win their first title.

== Draw ==
Group A	Group B
Cape Verde; Macau; Mozambique	Angola; Guinea-Bissau; India

== Preliminary round ==
Times are local (UTC+05:30).

Qualified for the semi-finals

=== Group A ===
Team	W	L	PF	PA	Diff	Pts.
Mozambique	2	0	167	90	+77	4
Cape Verde	1	1	150	113	+37	3
Macau	0	2	80	194	-114	2

=== Group B ===
Team	W	L	PF	PA	Diff	Pts.
India	2	0	160	123	+37	4
Angola	1	1	158	124	+34	3
Guinea-Bissau	0	2	94	165	-71	2

23 January 2014
14:00

Cape Verde	94–46	Macau
Scoring by quarter: 28-3, 21-13, 25-9, 20-21

MP Indoor Stadium, Goa

18:00

Guinea-Bissau	48–82	India
Scoring by quarter: 9-19, 9-27, 12-21, 18-15

MP Indoor Stadium, Goa

24 January 2014
14:00

Macau	34–100	Mozambique
Scoring by quarter: 9-29, 8-20, 12-24, 5-27

MP Indoor Stadium, Goa

18:00

Angola	83–46	Guinea-Bissau
Scoring by quarter: 22-9, 12-18, 29-10, 20-9

MP Indoor Stadium, Goa

25 January 2014
14:00

Cape Verde	56–67	Mozambique
Scoring by quarter: 11-16, 17-18, 13-18, 15-15

MP Indoor Stadium, Goa

18:00

Angola	75–78	India
Scoring by quarter: 14-29, 17-20, 26-16, 18-13

MP Indoor Stadium, Goa

=== Semifinals ===
26 January 2014
16:00

Mozambique	55–71	Angola
Scoring by quarter: 11-16, 15-16, 17-19, 12-20

MP Indoor Stadium, Goa

18:00

Cape Verde	52–67	India
Scoring by quarter: 12-12, 14-21, 17-10, 9-24

MP Indoor Stadium, Goa

=== 5th place match ===
26 January 2014
12:00

Macau	71–68 (OT)	Guinea-Bissau
Scoring by quarter: 12-18, 9-16, 10-16, 28-9, Overtime: 12-9

MP Indoor Stadium, Goa

=== Bronze medal match ===
27 January 2014
13:00

Cape Verde	37–56	Mozambique
Scoring by quarter: 11-9, 13-12, 8-13, 5-22

MP Indoor Stadium, Goa

=== Final ===
27 January 2014

Angola	70–77	India
Scoring by quarter: 14-19, 16-15, 23-16, 17-27

MP Indoor Stadium, Goa

== Final standings ==
Rank	Team	Record
Gold medal	India	4–0
Silver medal	Angola	3–1
Bronze medal	Mozambique	3–1
4	Cape Verde	1–3
5	Macau	1–2
6	Guinea-Bissau	0–3

== Awards ==
Basketball at the 2014 Lusophony Games (Men's) winners

India
First title

Most Valuable Player
