= 2017 EABA Championship =

Fourth East Asian Basketball Championship

4th East Asian Basketball Championship

Tournament details
- Host country: Japan
- Dates: 3–7 June 2017
- Teams: 6
- Venue(s): 1 (in 1 host city)

Final positions
- Champions: Chinese Taipei (1st title)

Tournament statistics
- Games played: 11

The 4th East Asian Basketball Championship were the qualifying tournament of the 2017 FIBA Asia Cup. It served also as a subzone championship involving the East Asian basketball teams. The tournament was hosted by the city of Nagano in Japan from 3 to 7 June 2017. The Chinese Taipei won their first title after defeating the defending champions, Korea in the Finals, 77–64. Japan beat China to take the bronze medal, 76–58.

For the first time in the history of the tournament, five teams have qualified for the Asian continental championship due to two extra berths were added from the 2016 FIBA Asia Challenge.

== Results ==
=== Preliminary round ===
==== Group A ====
Pos	Team	Pld	W	L	PF	PA	PD	Pts	Qualification
1	Japan (H, Q)	2	2	0	197	116	+81	4	Qualification to semifinals and 2017 FIBA Asia Cup
2	South Korea (Q)	2	1	1	181	136	+45	3	Qualification to semifinals and 2017 FIBA Asia Cup
3	Macau	2	0	2	105	228	−123	2	Qualification to 5th place playoff

Source: FIBA
(H) Hosts; (Q) Qualified for the phase indicated

June 3
15:00

Boxscore

Japan	78–72	South Korea
Scoring by quarter: 23–18, 14–15, 21–23, 20–16
Pts: Brown 15; Rebs: Brown 8 Asts: Brown 5		Pts: Lee D.S. 15; Rebs: Heo I.Y., Heo H. 7 Asts: Heo H. 5

Nagano Mashima General Sports Arena, Nagano

June 4
15:00

Boxscore

Macau	47–119	Japan
Scoring by quarter: 15–25, 6–31, 13–27, 13–36
Pts: Hoi 12; Rebs: Lo 5 Asts: 3 players at 2 each		Pts: Hiejima 17; Rebs: Takeuchi 9 Asts: Hiejima 10

Nagano Mashima General Sports Arena, Nagano
Referees: Harja Jaladri (INA), Chan Ho Ming (HKG), Zhang Zhiwei (CHN)

June 5
16:45

Boxscore

South Korea	109–58	Macau
Scoring by quarter: 30–14, 14–12, 32–14, 33–18
Pts: Lee D.S. 26; Rebs: Jeong, Park 7 Asts: Heo H. 7		Pts: Chan 16; Rebs: Chan 15; Asts: Lam 4

Nagano Mashima General Sports Arena, Nagano

==== Group B ====
Pos	Team	Pld	W	L	PF	PA	PD	Pts	Qualification
1	China (Q)	2	2	0	186	123	+63	4	Qualification to semifinals and 2017 FIBA Asia Cup
2	Chinese Taipei (Q)	2	1	1	155	153	+2	3	Qualification to semifinals and 2017 FIBA Asia Cup
3	Hong Kong	2	0	2	117	182	−65	2	Qualification to 5th place playoff

Source: FIBA
(Q) Qualified for the phase indicated

June 3
17:15

Boxscore

China	96–63	Chinese Taipei
Scoring by quarter: 21–8, 27–17, 19–13, 29–25
Pts: Zhao 22; Rebs: Hu 8 Asts: Sun 8		Pts: Davis 15; Rebs: Davis 9 Asts: Chiang 4

Nagano Mashima General Sports Arena, Nagano

June 4
17:15

Boxscore

Hong Kong	60–90	China
Scoring by quarter: 9–24, 15–29, 11–17, 25–20
Pts: Reid 16; Rebs: Reid 10; Asts: Chan 5, Lo 5		Pts: Hu 17; Rebs: Hu 12; Asts: Sun 9

Nagano Mashima General Sports Arena, Nagano

June 5
19:00

Boxscore

Chinese Taipei	92–57	Hong Kong
Scoring by quarter: 22–11, 22–13, 29–22, 19–11

Nagano Mashima General Sports Arena, Nagano

=== Classification 5th–6th ===
Winner has qualified to the 2017 FIBA Asia Cup.

June 6
14:30

Boxscore

Macau	81–96	Hong Kong
Scoring by quarter: 11–17, 9–29, 32–34, 29–16

Nagano Mashima General Sports Arena, Nagano

== Final round ==
Semi-finals
6 June
Japan	73
Chinese Taipei	78
6 June
China	104
South Korea (OT)	106

Final
Chinese Taipei	77
South Korea	64
Bronze medal match
Japan	76
China	58

=== Semifinals ===
June 6
19:00

Boxscore

Japan	73–78	Chinese Taipei
Scoring by quarter: 15–25, 11–15, 21–15, 26–23
Pts: Hiejima 20; Rebs: Brown 8 Asts: Hashimoto 4		Pts: Davis 29; Rebs: Davis 17; Asts: Chiang 5

Nagano Mashima General Sports Arena, Nagano

June 6
19:00

Boxscore

China	104–106 (OT)	South Korea
Scoring by quarter: 21–20, 15–25, 25–19, 32–29, Overtime: 11–13
Pts: Sun 28; Rebs: Hu 18; Asts: Hu 7		Pts: Heo I.Y. 22; Rebs: three players 5 Asts: Lee J.H. 6

Nagano Mashima General Sports Arena, Nagano

=== Bronze medal match ===
June 7
19:00

Boxscore

China	58–76	Japan
Scoring by quarter: 9–26, 11–9, 21–22, 17–19
Pts: Zhao 20; Rebs: Hu 14; Asts: Sun 4		Pts: Brown 21; Rebs: Brown 11; Asts: Tanaka 5

Nagano Mashima General Sports Arena, Nagano

=== Final ===
June 7
16:45

Boxscore

South Korea	64–77	Chinese Taipei
Scoring by quarter: 20–15, 14–24, 17–24, 13–14
Pts: Heo I.Y. 18; Rebs: Lee J.H. 7 Asts: Heo H., Lee D.S. 6		Pts: Liu 23; Rebs: Davis 13; Asts: Yu 4

Nagano Mashima General Sports Arena, Nagano
