= Basketball at the 2014 Lusofonia Games – Women's tournament =

Basketball at the 2014 Lusophony Games Women's Tournament
Tournament details
- Host country: India
- Dates: 23–27 January 2014
- Teams: 4
- Venue: 1 (in 1 host city)

Final positions
- Champions: Mozambique (2nd title)

Official website
- Basketball at the 2014 Lusophony Games

The Women's Basketball Tournament at the 2014 Lusophony Games was the 3rd Lusophony Games basketball tournament, played under the rules of FIBA, the world governing body for basketball. The tournament was hosted by India from 23 to 27 January 2014.

Mozambique ended the round-robin tournament with a 3–0 unbeaten record to win their second title.

== Participating teams ==
Angola
India
Macau
Mozambique

== Schedule ==
Times are local (UTC+05:30).

P	Team	M	W	L	PF	PA	Diff	Pts.
1	Mozambique	3	3	0	276	124	+152	6
2	Angola	3	2	1	217	162	+55	5
3	India	3	1	2	214	203	+11	4
4	Macau	3	0	3	105	323	-218	3

=== Day 1 ===
23 January 2014
16:00

Macau	29–111	Mozambique
Scoring by quarter: 6-37, 8-24, 9-30, 6-20

MP Indoor Stadium, Goa

26 January 2014
14:00

Angola	66–58	India
Scoring by quarter: 15-19, 13-11, 17-14, 21-14

MP Indoor Stadium, Goa

=== Day 2 ===
25 January 2014
12:00

Angola	102–31	Macau
Scoring by quarter: 30-7, 23-7, 20-8, 29-9

MP Indoor Stadium, Goa

January 2014
16:00

India	46–92	Mozambique
Scoring by quarter: 14-24, 9-21, 12-26, 11-21

MP Indoor Stadium, Goa

=== Day 3 ===
24 January 2014
16:00

India	110–45	Macau
Scoring by quarter: 39-10, 29-12, 18-9, 24-14

MP Indoor Stadium, Goa

27 January 2014
15:00

Angola	49–73	Mozambique
Scoring by quarter: 7-16, 14-24, 20-18, 8-15

MP Indoor Stadium, Goa

== Final standings ==
Rank	Team	Record
Gold medal	Mozambique	3–0
Silver medal	Angola	2–1
Bronze medal	India	1–2
4	Macau	0–3

== Awards ==
Basketball at the 2014 Lusophony Games (Women's) winners

Mozambique
Second title

Most Valuable Player
