= 2002 ABC Under-18 Championship for Women =

2002 FIBA U18 Women's Asia Cup
16th FIBA Under-18 Women's Asian Basketball Championship

Tournament details
- Host country: Taiwan
- Dates: December 21–30
- Teams: 10 (from 44 federations)
- Venue: 1 (in 1 host city)

Final positions
- Champions: China (9th title)

The ABC Under-18 Championship for Women 2002 is the 16th edition of the ABC's junior championship for basketball. The games were held at Taipei from December 21–30, 2002.

== Preliminary round ==
=== Group A ===
Team	Pld	W	L	PF	PA	PD	Pts
Chinese Taipei	4	4	0	390	238	+152	8
China	4	3	1	434	220	+214	7
North Korea	4	2	2	379	237	+142	6
India	4	1	3	248	381	−133	5
Macau	4	0	4	122	497	−375	4

December 21
17:00

China	155–24	Macau
Scoring by quarter: 39–2, 53–2, 25–7, 38–13

TPEC Gymnasium, Taipei

December 21
19:30

Chinese Taipei	82–71	North Korea
Scoring by quarter: 18–13, 22–26, 26–17, 16–15

TPEC Gymnasium, Taipei

December 22
15:30

Macau	30–107	Chinese Taipei
Scoring by quarter: 2–23, 12–29, 10–30, 6–25

TPEC Gymnasium, Taipei

December 22
19:30

North Korea	120–38	India
Scoring by quarter: 27–15, 25–12, 39–4, 29–7

TPEC Gymnasium, Taipei

December 23
17:30

North Korea	63–97	China
Scoring by quarter: 21–30, 6–27, 21–17, 15–23

TPEC Gymnasium, Taipei

December 23
19:30

India	55–113	Chinese Taipei
Scoring by quarter: 15–37, 19–18, 15–24, 6–34

TPEC Gymnasium, Taipei

December 25
15:30

Macau	20–125	North Korea
Scoring by quarter: 6–27, 4–44, 5–21, 5–33

TPEC Gymnasium, Taipei

December 25
17:30

China	100–45	India
Scoring by quarter: 35–2, 20–15, 14–13, 31–15

TPEC Gymnasium, Taipei

December 26
15:30

India	110–48	Macau
Scoring by quarter: 29–7, 28–16, 21–13, 32–12

TPEC Gymnasium, Taipei

December 26
17:30

Chinese Taipei	88–82	China
Scoring by quarter: 26–15, 19–16, 20–25, 23–26

TPEC Gymnasium, Taipei

=== Group B ===
Team	Pld	W	L	PF	PA	PD	Pts
South Korea	4	4	0	407	183	+224	8
Japan	4	3	1	498	177	+321	7
Thailand	4	2	2	311	298	+13	6
Malaysia	4	1	3	247	358	−111	5
Mongolia	4	0	4	143	590	−447	4

December 21
13:00

South Korea	109–30	Malaysia
Scoring by quarter: 35–9, 23–8, 25–7, 26–6

TPEC Gymnasium, Taipei

December 21
15:00

Japan	106–50	Thailand
Scoring by quarter: 33–18, 20–5, 16–15, 37–12

TPEC Gymnasium, Taipei

December 22
13:30

Mongolia	23–134	South Korea
Scoring by quarter: 13–27, 4–45, 4–38, 2–24

TPEC Gymnasium, Taipei

December 22
17:30

Malaysia	33–122	Japan
Scoring by quarter: 14–22, 6–34, 6–25, 7–41

TPEC Gymnasium, Taipei

December 23
13:30

Malaysia	124–58	Mongolia
Scoring by quarter: 23–19, 38–12, 26–15, 37–12

TPEC Gymnasium, Taipei

December 23
15:30

South Korea	91–65	Thailand
Scoring by quarter: 23–15, 26–17, 18–21, 24–12

TPEC Gymnasium, Taipei

December 25
13:30

Mongolia	21–205	Japan
Scoring by quarter: 5–46, 6–47, 6–45, 4–67

TPEC Gymnasium, Taipei

December 25
19:30

Thailand	69–60	Malaysia
Scoring by quarter: 21–18, 16–12, 20–15, 12–15

TPEC Gymnasium, Taipei

December 26
13:30

Mongolia	41–127	Thailand
Scoring by quarter: 14–22, 5–28, 9–32, 13–45

TPEC Gymnasium, Taipei

December 26
19:30

Japan	65–73	South Korea
Scoring by quarter: 25–24, 14–17, 19–15, 7–17

TPEC Gymnasium, Taipei

== Classification 5th–10th ==
=== 9th place ===
December 27
17:30

Macau	73–65	Mongolia
Scoring by quarter: 21–19, 13–20, 19–10, 20–16

TPEC Gymnasium, Taipei

=== 7th place ===
December 27
19:30

India	83–68	Malaysia
Scoring by quarter: 27–11, 20–15, 22–19, 14–23

TPEC Gymnasium, Taipei

=== 5th place ===
December 29
17:30

North Korea	104–67	Thailand
Scoring by quarter: 30–23, 20–18, 29–15, 25–11

TPEC Gymnasium, Taipei

== Final round ==
Semifinals
December 28
Chinese Taipei	79
Japan	76
December 28
South Korea	61
China	81

Final
December 30
Chinese Taipei	68
China	92
3rd place
December 29
Japan	72
South Korea	77

=== Semifinals ===
December 28
17:30

Chinese Taipei	79–76	Japan
Scoring by quarter: 21–20, 13–17, 25–18, 20–21

TPEC Gymnasium, Taipei

December 28
19:30

South Korea	61–81	China
Scoring by quarter: 20–18, 21–24, 7–12, 13–27

TPEC Gymnasium, Taipei

=== 3rd place ===
December 29
19:30

Japan	72–77	South Korea
Scoring by quarter: 19–19, 16–20, 13–22, 24–16

TPEC Gymnasium, Taipei

=== Final ===
December 30
19:00

Chinese Taipei	68–92	China
Scoring by quarter: 12–31, 18–15, 23–20, 15–26

TPEC Gymnasium, Taipei

== Final standing ==
Rank	Team	Record
1st place, gold medalist(s)	China	5–1
2nd place, silver medalist(s)	Chinese Taipei	5–1
3rd place, bronze medalist(s)	South Korea	5–1
4	Japan	3–3
5	North Korea	3–2
6	Thailand	2–3
7	India	2–3
8	Malaysia	1–4
9	Macau	1–4
10	Mongolia	0–5

== Awards ==
2002 Asian Under-18 champions

China
Ninth title

== See also ==
- List of sporting events in Taiwan
