= Macau women's national under-16 basketball team =

Macau
- FIBA zone: FIBA Asia
- National federation: Macau - China Basketball Association

U17 World Cup
- Appearances: None

U16 Asia Cup
- Appearances: 1 (2011)
- Medals: None

The Macau women's national under-16 basketball team is a national basketball team of Macau, administered by the Macau - China Basketball Association. It represents the country in international under-16 women's basketball competitions.

== FIBA U16 Asia Cup ==
So far, the team's only participation at the FIBA U16 Asia Cup was in 2011, where they finished in 12th place.

== See also ==
- Macau women's national basketball team
- Macau women's national under-18 basketball team
