= 1992 ABC Under-18 Championship =

1992 FIBA Under-18 Asia Cup
12th FIBA Under-18 Asian Basketball Championship

Tournament details
- Host country: China
- Dates: 25 September–2 October
- Teams: 14
- Venue(s): 1 (in 1 host city)

Final positions
- Champions: China (4th title)

The 1992 ABC Under-18 Championship was the twelfth edition of the Asian Championship for Junior Men. The tournament took place in Beijing, China from 25 September to 2 October 1992.

China successfully regained the title by thrashing Korea in the championship match, 93-80, for their fourth overall championship. Meanwhile, the Philippines, subdued the defending champions Japan, 103-74, in the battle for third place.

== Preliminary round ==
All times are in Chinese Standard Time (UTC+08:00)

=== Group A ===
Team	Pld	W	L	PF	PA	PD	Pts
Indonesia	3	3	0	128	108	+20	6
Japan	3	2	1	130	139	−9	5
Iran	3	1	2	129	140	−11	4
Thailand	3	0	3	0	0	0	3

25 September

Thailand	L–W	Japan

Beijing

25 September

Report

Iran	54–64	Indonesia

Beijing

26 September

Iran	W–L	Thailand

Beijing

26 September

Report

Indonesia	64–54	Japan

Beijing

27 September

Thailand	L–W	Indonesia

Beijing

27 September

Report

Japan	76–75	Iran

Beijing

=== Group B ===
Team	Pld	W	L	PF	PA	PD	Pts
China	2	2	0	88	21	+67	4
South Korea	2	1	1	90	50	+40	3
Sri Lanka	2	0	2	71	178	−107	2

25 September

South Korea	L–W	China

Beijing

26 September

Report

China	88–21	Sri Lanka

Beijing

27 September

Report

Sri Lanka	50–90	South Korea

Beijing

=== Group C ===
Team	Pld	W	L	PF	PA	PD	Pts
Philippines	2	2	0	210	71	+139	4
Hong Kong	1	1	0	113	153	−40	3
Macau	2	0	2	105	204	−99	2

25 September

Report

Hong Kong	86–61	Macau

Beijing

26 September

Report

Macau	44–118	Philippines

Beijing

27 September

Report

Philippines	92–27	Hong Kong

Beijing

=== Group D ===
Team	Pld	W	L	PF	PA	PD	Pts
Chinese Taipei	3	3	0	65	50	+15	6
Qatar	3	2	1	50	65	−15	5
Malaysia	3	1	2	0	0	0	4
Singapore	3	0	3	0	0	0	3

25 September

Singapore	L–W	Qatar

Beijing

25 September

Malaysia	L–W	Chinese Taipei

Beijing

26 September

Malaysia	W–L	Singapore

Beijing

26 September

Report

Chinese Taipei	65–50	Qatar

Beijing

27 September

Singapore	L–W	Chinese Taipei

Beijing

27 September

Qatar	W–L	Malaysia

Beijing

== Quarterfinal round ==
=== Group I ===
Team	Pld	W	L	PF	PA	PD	Pts
South Korea	3	3	0	102	93	+9	6
Philippines	3	2	1	239	214	+25	5
Indonesia	3	1	2	133	149	−16	4
Qatar	2	0	2	111	123	−12	3

28 September

Report

Philippines	93–102	South Korea
Pts: Duremdes 33		Pts: Seo J.H. 24

Beijing

28 September

Report

Qatar	58–68	Indonesia

Beijing

29 September

Report

Philippines	91–65	Indonesia

Beijing

29 September

South Korea	W–L	Qatar

Beijing

30 September

Report

Philippines	55–53	Qatar

Beijing

30 September

South Korea	W–L	Indonesia

Beijing

=== Group II ===
Team	Pld	W	L	PF	PA	PD	Pts
China	3	3	0	107	30	+77	6
Japan	3	2	1	81	79	+2	5
Chinese Taipei	3	1	2	79	81	−2	4
Hong Kong	3	0	3	30	107	−77	3

28 September

Report

China	107–30	Hong Kong

Beijing

28 September

Report

Chinese Taipei	79–81	Japan

Beijing

29 September

China	W–L	Chinese Taipei

Beijing

29 September

Hong Kong	L–W	Japan

Beijing

30 September

China	W–L	Japan

Beijing

30 September

Chinese Taipei	W–L	Hong Kong

Beijing

== Final round ==
Semifinals
1 October
Philippines	74
China	82
1 October
Japan
South Korea

Final
2 October
China	93
South Korea	80
3rd place
2 October
Philippines	103
Japan	74

=== Semifinals ===
1 October

Report

Philippines	74–82	China
Pts: Espino 21		Pts: Da 28

Beijing

1 October

Japan	vs.	South Korea
Scoring by half: –, –

Beijing

=== 3rd place ===
2 October

Report

Philippines	103–74	Japan
Scoring by half: 51–35, 50–39

Beijing

=== Final ===
2 October

Report

China	93–80	South Korea
Scoring by half: –, –

Beijing

== Final standing ==
Rank	Team	Record
1st place, gold medalist(s)	China	–
2nd place, silver medalist(s)	South Korea	–
3rd place, bronze medalist(s)	Philippines	–
4	Japan	–
5	Chinese Taipei	–
6	Indonesia	–
7	Qatar	–
8	Hong Kong	–
9	Iran	–
10	Thailand	–
11	Malaysia	–
12	Singapore	–
13	Macau	–
14	Sri Lanka	–

== Awards ==
1992 Asian Under-18 champions

China
Fourth title
