= Walid Doumiati =

Lebanese basketball player

No. 8 – Sporting Al Riyadi Beirut
- Position: Point guard
- League: Lebanese Basketball League

Personal information
- Born: July 16, 1968 Beirut, Lebanon
- Listed height: 1.79 m (5 ft 10 in)
- Listed weight: 76 kg (168 lb)

Career information
- Playing career: 1989–2002
Medals
Men's basketball
Representing Lebanon
FIBA Asia Championship
Silver medal – second place	2001 Shanghai	Team

Walid Mahmoud El Doumiati (born July 16, 1968 in Beirut, Lebanon) is a retired Lebanese professional basketball player who last played for Sporting Al Riyadi Beirut. Doumiati alongside Elie Mechantaf and Fadi El Khatib helped build the sport of basketball in Lebanon since the draft of Lebanese NBA player Rony Seikaly. Walid was committed to Sporting Al Riyadi Beirut leading the team to successive titles, despite being held back by archrivals Hekmeh BC during the 1990s. Walid was also a member of the Lebanon national basketball team during its first ever appearance in the 2002 FIBA World Championship in Indianapolis after earning a silver medal at the 2001 ABC Championship.
