= 1983 ABC Championship =

1983 FIBA Asia Cup
12th Asian Basketball Championship

Tournament details
- Host country: Hong Kong
- Dates: November 20–29
- Teams: 15 (from all Asian federations)
- Venue(s): 2 (in 1 host city)

Final positions
- Champions: China (5th title)

Tournament statistics
- MVP: (China) Guo Yonglin

The 1983 Asian Basketball Confederation Championship for Men were held in Hong Kong from November 20 to November 29, 1983. Queen Elizabeth Stadium and Queen Elizabeth II Youth Centre were used for this tournament.

== Preliminary round ==
=== Group A ===
Team	Pld	W	L	PF	PA	PD	Pts
China	3	3	0	344	200	+144	6
Iran	3	2	1	249	213	+36	5
Indonesia	3	1	2	178	283	−105	4
Pakistan	3	0	3	200	275	−75	3

November 20

Iran	90–69	Pakistan
Scoring by half: 39–32, 51–37

Hong Kong

November 20

China	135–58	Indonesia
Scoring by half: 76–24, 59–34

Hong Kong

November 21

Indonesia	47–85	Iran
Scoring by half: 23–41, 24–44

Hong Kong

November 21

Pakistan	68–112	China
Scoring by half: 34–62, 34–50

Hong Kong

November 22

Iran	74–97	China
Scoring by half: 39–52, 35–45

Hong Kong

November 22

Pakistan	63–73	Indonesia
Scoring by half: 32–40, 31–33

Hong Kong

=== Group B ===
Team	Pld	W	L	PF	PA	PD	Pts
South Korea	3	3	0	370	192	+178	6
Hong Kong	3	2	1	302	226	+76	5
Thailand	3	1	2	216	279	−63	4
Macau	3	0	3	164	355	−191	3

November 20

Hong Kong	116–50	Macau
Scoring by half: 57–29, 59–21

Hong Kong

November 20

South Korea	121–50	Thailand
Scoring by half: 61–25, 60–25

Hong Kong

November 21

Macau	46–133	South Korea
Scoring by half: 23–75, 23–58

Hong Kong

November 21

Thailand	60–90	Hong Kong
Scoring by half: 33–43, 27–47

Hong Kong

November 22

South Korea	116–96	Hong Kong
Scoring by half: 63–42, 53–54

Hong Kong

November 22

Thailand	106–68	Macau
Scoring by half: 52–38, 54–30

Hong Kong

=== Group C ===
Team	Pld	W	L	PF	PA	PD	Pts
Japan	3	3	0	245	195	+50	6
Jordan	3	2	1	243	218	+25	5
Malaysia	3	1	2	219	226	−7	4
Singapore	3	0	3	183	251	−68	3

November 20

Malaysia	74–82	Jordan
Scoring by half: 46–32, 28–50

Hong Kong

November 20

Japan	88–52	Singapore
Scoring by half: 37–22, 51–30

Hong Kong

November 21

Singapore	66–76	Malaysia
Scoring by half: 32–43, 34–33

Hong Kong

November 21

Jordan	74–79	Japan
Scoring by half: 40–33, 34–46

Hong Kong

November 22

Malaysia	69–78	Japan
Scoring by half: 42–39, 27–39

Hong Kong

November 22

Singapore	65–87	Jordan
Scoring by half: 34–44, 31–43

Hong Kong

=== Group D ===
Team	Pld	W	L	PF	PA	PD	Pts
Kuwait	2	2	0	72	57	+15	4
India	2	1	1	59	70	−11	3
Philippines	2	0	2	0	4	−4	0

November 20

Philippines	0–2	Kuwait
Forfeit

Hong Kong

November 21

Kuwait	70–57	India
Scoring by half: 24–29, 46–28

Hong Kong

November 22

India	2–0	Philippines
Forfeit

Hong Kong

- The Philippines originally beat Kuwait 78–57 and India 90–60 and topped the group but Asian Basketball Confederation cancelled the results on November 23, 1983 and declared naturalized players Jeff Moore and Dennis Still ineligible due to lack of residency.

== Second round ==
=== Classification 13th–15th ===
Team	Pld	W	L	PF	PA	PD	Pts
Pakistan	2	2	0	196	120	+76	4
Singapore	2	1	1	203	156	+47	3
Macau	2	0	2	128	251	−123	2

November 25

Macau	74–137	Singapore
Scoring by half: 31–68, 43–69

Hong Kong

November 26

Pakistan	114–54	Macau
Scoring by half: 58–27, 56–27

Hong Kong

November 29

Pakistan	82–66	Singapore
Scoring by half: 46–38, 36–28

Hong Kong

=== Classification 9th–12th ===
Team	Pld	W	L	PF	PA	PD	Pts
Philippines	3	3	0	254	213	+41	6
Thailand	3	2	1	246	224	+22	5
Malaysia	3	1	2	262	251	+11	4
Indonesia	3	0	3	199	273	−74	3

November 24

Indonesia	65–81	Thailand
Scoring by half: 39–39, 26–42

Hong Kong

November 24

Malaysia	80–85	Philippines
Scoring by half: 36–40, 44–45

Hong Kong

November 25

Philippines	95–64	Indonesia
Scoring by half: 46–23, 49–41

Hong Kong

November 25

Thailand	96–85	Malaysia
Scoring by half: 44–39, 52–46

Hong Kong

November 28

Indonesia	70–97	Malaysia
Scoring by half: 36–56, 34–41

Hong Kong

November 28

Thailand	69–74	Philippines
Scoring by half: 27–43, 42–31

Hong Kong

=== Classification 5th–8th ===
Team	Pld	W	L	PF	PA	PD	Pts
Iran	3	3	0	172	152	+20	6
India	3	1	2	239	240	−1	4
Hong Kong	3	0	3	214	261	−47	3
Jordan	3	2	1	174	146	+28	0

November 25

Iran	81–71	Hong Kong
Scoring by half: 34–27, 47–44

Hong Kong

November 25

Jordan	80–72	India
Scoring by half: 42–29, 38–43

Hong Kong

November 26

India	81–89	Iran
Scoring by half: 40–41, 41–48

Hong Kong

November 26

Hong Kong	72–94	Jordan
Scoring by half: 34–42, 38–52

Hong Kong

November 29

Iran	2–0	Jordan
Walkover

Hong Kong

November 29

Hong Kong	71–86	India
Scoring by half: 41–50, 30–36

Hong Kong

- Jordan were relegated to 8th place after their team returned home on 26 November, and subsequently failed to appear for their match against Iran.

=== Championship ===
Team	Pld	W	L	PF	PA	PD	Pts
China	3	3	0	281	190	+91	6
Japan	3	2	1	242	239	+3	5
South Korea	3	1	2	243	245	−2	4
Kuwait	3	0	3	154	246	−92	3

November 24

South Korea	88–93 (OT)	Japan
Scoring by half: 46–44, 34–36 Overtime: 8–13

Queen Elizabeth Stadium, Hong Kong

November 24

China	84–48	Kuwait
Scoring by half: 41–27, 43–21

Queen Elizabeth Stadium, Hong Kong

November 26

Japan	70–46	Kuwait
Scoring by half: 38–24, 32–22

Queen Elizabeth Stadium, Hong Kong

November 26

China	92–63	South Korea
Scoring by half: 50–34, 42–29

Queen Elizabeth Stadium, Hong Kong

November 28

South Korea	92–60	Kuwait
Scoring by half: 51–34, 41–26

Queen Elizabeth Stadium, Hong Kong

November 28

Japan	79–105	China
Scoring by half: 31–61, 48–44

Queen Elizabeth Stadium, Hong Kong

== Final round ==
=== 3rd place ===
November 29

Kuwait	60–83	South Korea
Scoring by half: 36–45, 24–38

Queen Elizabeth Stadium, Hong Kong

=== Final ===
November 29

China	95–71	Japan
Scoring by half: 49–32, 46–39

Queen Elizabeth Stadium, Hong Kong

== Final standings ==
Qualified for the 1984 Summer Olympics

Rank	Team	Record
1st place, gold medalist(s)	China	7–0
2nd place, silver medalist(s)	Japan	5–2
3rd place, bronze medalist(s)	South Korea	5–2
4	Kuwait	2–4
5	Iran	5–1
6	India	2–3
7	Hong Kong	2–4
8	Jordan	4–2
9	Philippines	3–2
10	Thailand	3–3
11	Malaysia	2–4
12	Indonesia	1–5
13	Pakistan	2–3
14	Singapore	1–4
15	Macau	0–5

== Awards ==
1983 Asian champions

China
Fifth title

- Most Valuable Player: (China) Guo Yonglin
- All-Star Team:
  - (China) Guo Yonglin
  - (South Korea) Lee Chung-hee
