= 1987 ABC Championship =

1987 FIBA Asia Cup
14th Asian Basketball Championship

Tournament details
- Host country: Thailand
- Dates: November 14–27
- Teams: 15
- Venue(s): 1 (in 1 host city)

Final positions
- Champions: China (6th title)

Tournament statistics
- MVP: (South Korea) Lee Chung-Hee

The 1987 Asian Basketball Confederation Championship for Men were held in Bangkok, Thailand.

== Draw ==
Group A	Group B	Group C	Group D
Philippines; ~~Iran~~ * Jordan; India	South Korea; Thailand; Indonesia; Macau	China; Chinese Taipei; Singapore; Iraq	Malaysia; Japan; Hong Kong; Bahrain

* Withdrew

== Preliminary round ==
=== Group A ===
Team	Pld	W	L	PF	PA	PD	Pts
Philippines	2	2	0	184	170	+14	4
India	2	1	1	168	159	+9	3
Jordan	2	0	2	163	186	−23	2

November 14
17:30

Philippines	97–91	Jordan
Scoring by half: 47–58, 50–33

National Gymnasium, Bangkok

November 17
17:30

Jordan	72–89	India
Scoring by half: 29–37, 43–52

National Gymnasium, Bangkok

November 19
19:00

India	79–87	Philippines
Scoring by half: 39–38, 40–49

National Gymnasium, Bangkok

=== Group B ===
Team	Pld	W	L	PF	PA	PD	Pts
South Korea	3	3	0	323	149	+174	6
Thailand	3	2	1	276	222	+54	5
Indonesia	3	1	2	188	256	−68	4
Macau	3	0	3	158	318	−160	3

November 14
16:00

Thailand	85–68	Indonesia
Scoring by half: 48–35, 37–33

National Gymnasium, Bangkok

November 15
16:00

South Korea	114–42	Macau
Scoring by half: 56–17, 58–25

National Gymnasium, Bangkok

November 16
17:30

Indonesia	40–120	South Korea
Scoring by half: 17–59, 23–61

National Gymnasium, Bangkok

November 17
14:30

Macau	51–80	Indonesia
Scoring by half: 19–50, 32–30

National Gymnasium, Bangkok

November 17
19:00

South Korea	89–67	Thailand
Scoring by half: 51–37, 38–30

National Gymnasium, Bangkok

November 19
16:00

Thailand	124–65	Macau
Scoring by half: 64–29, 60–36

National Gymnasium, Bangkok

=== Group C ===
Team	Pld	W	L	PF	PA	PD	Pts
China	3	3	0	289	213	+76	6
Chinese Taipei	3	2	1	287	239	+48	5
Iraq	3	1	2	259	251	+8	4
Singapore	3	0	3	198	330	−132	3

November 15
14:30

Iraq	84–86	China
Scoring by half: 42–42, 42–44

National Gymnasium, Bangkok

November 15
19:00

Chinese Taipei	114–77	Singapore
Scoring by half: 56–35, 58–42

National Gymnasium, Bangkok

November 16
16:00

China	85–73	Chinese Taipei
Scoring by half: 37–39, 48–34

National Gymnasium, Bangkok

November 17
16:00

Singapore	65–98	Iraq
Scoring by half: 37–51, 28–47

National Gymnasium, Bangkok

November 18
16:00

China	118–56	Singapore
Scoring by half: 61–30, 57–26

National Gymnasium, Bangkok

November 18
17:30

Iraq	77–100	Chinese Taipei
Scoring by half: 38–43, 39–57

National Gymnasium, Bangkok

=== Group D ===
Team	Pld	W	L	PF	PA	PD	Pts
Japan	3	3	0	277	191	+86	6
Malaysia	3	2	1	255	208	+47	5
Bahrain	3	1	2	191	229	−38	4
Hong Kong	3	0	3	210	305	−95	3

November 14
19:00

Malaysia	118–81	Hong Kong
Scoring by half: 60–40, 58–41

National Gymnasium, Bangkok

November 15
17:30

Japan	94–60	Bahrain
Scoring by half: 52–32, 42–28

National Gymnasium, Bangkok

November 16
19:00

Bahrain	79–68	Hong Kong
Scoring by half: 47–32, 32–36

National Gymnasium, Bangkok

November 18
14:30

Hong Kong	61–108	Japan
Scoring by half: 26–54, 35–54

National Gymnasium, Bangkok

November 18
19:00

Bahrain	52–67	Malaysia
Scoring by half: 38–31, 29–21

National Gymnasium, Bangkok

November 19
17:30

Japan	75–70	Malaysia
Scoring by half: 46–35, 29–35

National Gymnasium, Bangkok

== Quarterfinal round ==
=== Group I ===
Team	Pld	W	L	PF	PA	PD	Pts
China	3	3	0	295	235	+60	6
Philippines	3	2	1	289	277	+12	5
Malaysia	3	1	2	261	254	+7	4
Thailand	3	0	3	223	302	−79	3

November 21
17:30

Malaysia	95–68	Thailand
Scoring by half: 49–34, 46–34

National Gymnasium, Bangkok

November 21
19:00

China	97–94	Philippines
Scoring by half: 55–42, 42–52

National Gymnasium, Bangkok

November 22
16:00

Philippines	97–94	Malaysia
Scoring by half: 53–46, 44–48

National Gymnasium, Bangkok

November 22
17:30

Thailand	69–109	China
Scoring by half: 32–63, 37–46

National Gymnasium, Bangkok

November 23
14:30

China	89–72	Malaysia
Scoring by half: 42–38, 47–34

National Gymnasium, Bangkok

November 23
17:30

Philippines	98–86	Thailand
Scoring by half: 52–44, 46–42

National Gymnasium, Bangkok

=== Group II ===
Team	Pld	W	L	PF	PA	PD	Pts
South Korea	3	3	0	287	205	+82	6
Japan	3	2	1	223	221	+2	5
Chinese Taipei	3	1	2	242	246	−4	4
India	3	0	3	206	286	−80	3

November 21
14:30

South Korea	85–52	Japan
Scoring by half: 40–31, 45–21

National Gymnasium, Bangkok

November 21
16:00

India	67–92	Chinese Taipei
Scoring by half: 42–33, 25–59

National Gymnasium, Bangkok

November 22
14:30

Japan	90–67	India
Scoring by half: 42–32, 48–35

National Gymnasium, Bangkok

November 22
19:00

Chinese Taipei	81–98	South Korea
Scoring by half: 39–51, 42–47

National Gymnasium, Bangkok

November 23
16:00

Japan	81–69	Chinese Taipei
Scoring by half: 34–24, 47–45

National Gymnasium, Bangkok

November 23
19:00

South Korea	104–72	India
Scoring by half: 61–32, 43–40

National Gymnasium, Bangkok

=== Group III ===
Team	Pld	W	L	PF	PA	PD	Pts
Jordan	3	3	0	327	224	+103	6
Iraq	3	2	1	350	227	+123	5
Hong Kong	3	1	2	299	302	−3	4
Macau	3	0	3	208	431	−223	3

November 21
10:00

Hong Kong	135–76	Macau
Scoring by half: 61–30, 74–46

National Gymnasium, Bangkok

November 21
11:30

Iraq	76–79	Jordan
Scoring by half: 38–38, 38–41

National Gymnasium, Bangkok

November 22
10:00

Macau	69–136	Iraq
Scoring by half: 29–67, 40–69

National Gymnasium, Bangkok

November 22
13:00

Jordan	88–85	Hong Kong
Scoring by half: 46–37, 42–48

National Gymnasium, Bangkok

November 23
10:00

Iraq	138–79	Hong Kong
Scoring by half: 72–43, 66–36

National Gymnasium, Bangkok

November 23
11:30

Jordan	160–63	Macau
Scoring by half: 70–36, 90–27

National Gymnasium, Bangkok

=== Group IV ===
Team	Pld	W	L	PF	PA	PD	Pts	Tiebreaker
Singapore	2	1	1	147	145	+2	3	1–1 / 1.014
Indonesia	2	1	1	133	133	0	3	1–1 / 1.000
Bahrain	2	1	1	139	141	−2	3	1–1 / 0.986

November 21
13:00

Indonesia	63–64	Bahrain
Scoring by half: 24–38, 39–26

National Gymnasium, Bangkok

November 22
11:30

Bahrain	75–78	Singapore
Scoring by half: 34–49, 41–29

National Gymnasium, Bangkok

November 23
13:00

Indonesia	70–69	Singapore
Scoring by half: 46–33, 24–36

National Gymnasium, Bangkok

== Classification 13th–15th ==
Semifinals
November 24
Hong Kong
Bye
November 24
Bahrain	103
Macau	49

13th place
November 25
Hong Kong	0
Bahrain	2

=== Semifinals ===
November 24
10:00

Bahrain	103–49	Macau
Scoring by half: 55–34, 48–15

National Gymnasium, Bangkok

=== 13th place ===
November 25
16:00

Hong Kong	0–2	Bahrain
Game abandoned in the first half with Bahrain leading 26–20 after Hong Kong walked off the court to protest the officiating; Bahrain were awarded the game on forfeit.

National Gymnasium, Bangkok

== Classification 9th–12th ==
Semifinals
November 24
Jordan	108
Indonesia	65
November 24
Singapore	59
Iraq	114

9th place
November 25
Jordan	65
Iraq	92
11th place
November 25
Indonesia	73
Singapore	75

=== Semifinals ===
November 24
11:30

Jordan	108–65	Indonesia
Scoring by half: 54–32, 54–33

National Gymnasium, Bangkok

November 24
13:00

Singapore	59–114	Iraq
Scoring by half: 25–60, 34–54

National Gymnasium, Bangkok

=== 11th place ===
November 25
17:30

Indonesia	73–75	Singapore
Scoring by half: 46–50, 27–25

National Gymnasium, Bangkok

=== 9th place ===
November 25
19:00

Jordan	65–92	Iraq
Scoring by half: 32–39, 33–53

National Gymnasium, Bangkok

== Classification 5th–8th ==
Semifinals
November 24
Malaysia	84
India	85
November 24
Chinese Taipei	89
Thailand	76

5th place
November 26
India	59
Chinese Taipei	79
7th place
November 26
Malaysia	90
Thailand	68

=== Semifinals ===
November 24
14:30

Malaysia	84–85	India
Scoring by half: 52–44, 32–41

National Gymnasium, Bangkok

November 24
16:00

Chinese Taipei	89–76	Thailand
Scoring by half: 47–46, 42–30

National Gymnasium, Bangkok

=== 7th place ===
November 26
17:30

Malaysia	90–68	Thailand
Scoring by half: 46–35, 44–33

National Gymnasium, Bangkok

=== 5th place ===
November 26
19:00

India	59–79	Chinese Taipei
Scoring by half: 26–49, 33–30

National Gymnasium, Bangkok

== Final round ==
Semifinals
November 24
China	85
Japan	69
November 24
South Korea	105
Philippines	88

Final
November 27
China (OT)	86
South Korea	79
3rd place
November 27
Japan	89
Philippines	75

=== Semifinals ===
November 24
17:30

China	85–69	Japan
Scoring by half: 41–36, 44–33

National Gymnasium, Bangkok

November 24
19:00

South Korea	105–88	Philippines
Scoring by half: 49–30, 56–58

National Gymnasium, Bangkok

=== 3rd place ===
November 27
16:45

Japan	89–75	Philippines
Scoring by half: 46–32, 43–43
Pts: Ikeuchi 19		Pts: Magsanoc 18

National Gymnasium, Bangkok

=== Final ===
November 27
17:30

China	86–79 (OT)	South Korea
Scoring by half: 42–36, 34–40 Overtime: 10–3
Pts: Wang L.B. 26		Pts: Lee C.H., Hur J. 33

National Gymnasium, Bangkok

== Final standings ==
Qualified for the 1988 Summer Olympics

Rank	Team	Record
1st place, gold medalist(s)	China	8–0
2nd place, silver medalist(s)	South Korea	7–1
3rd place, bronze medalist(s)	Japan	6–2
4	Philippines	4–3
5	Chinese Taipei	5–3
6	India	2–5
7	Malaysia	4–4
8	Thailand	2–6
9	Iraq	5–3
10	Jordan	3–3
11	Singapore	2–5
12	Indonesia	2–4
13	Bahrain	4–3
14	Hong Kong	1–6
15	Macau	0–7

== Awards ==
1987 Asian champions

China
Sixth title

- Most Valuable Player: (South Korea) Lee Chung-Hee
- All-Star Team:
  - (China) Zhang Bin
  - (China) Sun Fengwu
  - (South Korea) Hur Jae
  - (South Korea) Lee Chung-Hee
  - (Philippines) Alvin Patrimonio
