= Shanghai International Gymnastic Center =

Sports venue in Shanghai, China

Coordinates: 31.215426°N 121.408882°E

The Shanghai International Gymnastic Center (Chinese: 上海国际体操中心) is a basketball arena, in Changning District, Shanghai, China. The arena holds 4,000 people.

It is currently used mostly for artistic gymnastics events.
