= Guinea-Bissau men's national basketball team =

Sports Team

Guinea Bissau
- FIBA ranking: NR (2 December 2025)
- Joined FIBA: 1994
- FIBA zone: FIBA Africa
- National federation: Federacao de Basquetebol da Guinée Bissau
- Coach: Rodrigues Florentino

Olympic Games
- Appearances: None

FIBA World Cup
- Appearances: None

FIBA Africa Championship
- Appearances: None
Home	Away

The Guinea-Bissau national basketball team is the national basketball team from Guinea-Bissau. It has yet to appear at the FIBA World Championship or the FIBA Africa Championship.

It is administered by the Federacao de Basquetebol da Guinée Bissau.

== Competitive record ==
=== Summer Olympics ===
yet to qualify

=== World Championship ===
yet to qualify

=== FIBA Africa Championship ===
yet to qualify

=== African Games ===
yet to qualify

=== Lusophony Games ===
- 2006 : 5th
- 2009 : 5th
- 2014 : 6th
- 2017 : To be determined

== Current roster ==
At the 2011 Afrobasket qualification: (last publicized squad)

Guinea-Bissau men's national basketball team roster
Players
Coaches

Pos.	No.	Name	Age – Date of birth	Height	Club	Ctr.
PF		Franklin Balde Capristano Furtado	23 – 21 October 1987	1.98 m (6 ft 6 in)
		Moamar Fortunato De Almeida	17 – 18 October 1993
		Alfa Indjai	16 – 20 January 1995
		Tanunde Mohamed Keita	17 – 29 December 1993
		Sisto Martinho Mendes	18 – 28 March 1993
		Bruno Miguel Henriques Medina	23 – 26 December 1987
		Antonio Mendes	23 – 10 March 1988
		Ronizio Lesmildo de Nascimento Nagha Bate	23 – 28 October 1987
		Jose Magide Ramos	16 – 29 April 1995
		Braima Sambu	21 – 24 March 1990
F		Josimar Vaz Cardoso	24 – 19 March 1987	2.01 m (6 ft 7 in)	Fisica Desportiva de Torres Vedras	(Portugal)
		Danilson Marques Vieira	25 – 30 August 1985

Head coach

- (Guinea-Bissau) Rodrigues Florentino

Assistant coaches

- (Guinea-Bissau) Alvaro Chantre

Legend

- Club – describes last
  club before the tournament
- Age – describes age
  on 10 August 2011

== See also ==
- Guinea-Bissau women's national basketball team
- Guinea-Bissau national under-18 basketball team
- Guinea-Bissau national under-16 basketball team
