= Lee Chung-hee (basketball) =

South Korean basketball player

Personal information
- Born: November 7, 1959 (age 65); Cheolwon, Gangwon Province, South Korea
- Listed height: 5 ft 11 in (1.80 m)
- Listed weight: 74 kg (163 lb)
- Position: Shooting guard
Medals
Men's basketball
Representing South Korea
FIBA Asia Cup
Silver medal – second place	1981 Kolkata	Team
Bronze medal – third place	1983 Hong Kong	Team
Silver medal – second place	1985 Kuala Lumpur	Team
Silver medal – second place	1987 Bangkok	Team
Silver medal – second place	1989 Beijing	Team
Asian Games
Silver medal – second place	1978 Bangkok	Team
Gold medal – first place	1982 New Delhi	Team
Silver medal – second place	1986 Seoul	Team
Bronze medal – third place	1990 Beijing	Team

Lee Chung-Hee (Korean: 이충희, born November 7, 1959, in Cheolwon, Gangwon Province) is a retired South Korean basketball player.

He played as a shooting guard. A strong perimeter shooter, Lee Chung Hee was named the Most Valuable Player of the 14th Asian Basketball Championship, albeit South Korea lost to China at the final in 1987. He is 180 cm (5 ft 11 in) tall. He competed at the 1988 Seoul Olympic Games, where the South Korean team finished in ninth position.

His former teams include Hyundai Electronics and Hung Kuo Elephants.
