= 2001 ABC Championship =

2001年亞洲籃球錦標賽

Tournament details
- Host country: China
- Dates: July 20–28
- Teams: 14
- Venues: 2 (in 1 host city)

Final positions
- Champions: China (12th title)
- Runners-up: Lebanon
- Third place: South Korea
- Fourth place: Syria

Tournament statistics
- MVP: (China) Yao Ming

The 2001 Asian Basketball Confederation Championship for Men was held in Shanghai, China.

== Qualification ==
According to the ABC rules, each zone had two places, and the hosts (China) and the best 5 teams of the previous Asian Championship were automatically qualified.

East Asia (4+2)	Gulf (2+2)	Middle Asia (2)	Southeast Asia (2)	West Asia (2)
China	Saudi Arabia	India	Philippines	Lebanon
South Korea	Kuwait	Uzbekistan	Thailand	Syria
Chinese Taipei	Qatar			
Japan	United Arab Emirates			
North Korea				
Hong Kong				

== Draw ==
Original draw:

Group A	Group B	Group C	Group D
China; ~~Philippines~~ ** Hong Kong; Uzbekistan	South Korea; United Arab Emirates; Thailand; ~~North Korea~~ *	~~Saudi Arabia~~ * Kuwait; Lebanon; Syria	Chinese Taipei; Japan; Qatar; India

* Withdrew

** Suspended by FIBA, replaced by Singapore which finished third in the Southeast Asian qualifiers.

With DPR Korea and Saudi Arabia out of the championship, the ABC has called for a redraw of the 14 participants in Kuala Lumpur, Malaysia on July 12.

Group A	Group B	Group C	Group D
China; Hong Kong; Thailand; Qatar	South Korea; United Arab Emirates; Singapore; Lebanon	Chinese Taipei; Uzbekistan; India	Japan; Kuwait; Syria

== Preliminary round ==
=== Group A ===
Team	Pld	W	L	PF	PA	PD	Pts
China	3	3	0	307	148	+159	6
Qatar	3	2	1	210	189	+21	5
Hong Kong	3	1	2	178	258	−80	4
Thailand	3	0	3	193	293	−100	3

July 20
11:00

Hong Kong	42–72	Qatar
Scoring by quarter: 12–17, 13–23, 9–16, 8–16

International Gymnastic Center, Shanghai

July 20
20:30

China	121–46	Thailand
Scoring by quarter: 40–10, 25–13, 25–6, 31–17

International Gymnastic Center, Shanghai

July 21
11:00

Thailand	87–92 (OT)	Hong Kong
Scoring by quarter: 21–18, 25–21, 10–20, 21–18, Overtime: 10–15

International Gymnastic Center, Shanghai

July 21
20:30

Qatar	58–87	China
Scoring by quarter: 15–19, 14–19, 11–27, 18–22

International Gymnastic Center, Shanghai

July 22
15:00

Thailand	60–80	Qatar
Scoring by quarter: 17–28, 19–23, 10–18, 14–11

International Gymnastic Center, Shanghai

July 22
20:30

China	99–44	Hong Kong
Scoring by quarter: 29–14, 25–3, 23–13, 22–14

International Gymnastic Center, Shanghai

=== Group B ===
Team	Pld	W	L	PF	PA	PD	Pts
South Korea	3	3	0	306	172	+134	6
Lebanon	3	2	1	231	222	+9	5
United Arab Emirates	3	1	2	198	215	−17	4
Singapore	3	0	3	167	293	−126	3

July 20
13:00

South Korea	124–51	Singapore
Scoring by quarter: 29–13, 37–16, 30–13, 28–9

International Gymnastic Center, Shanghai

July 20
17:00

United Arab Emirates	69–70	Lebanon
Scoring by quarter: 14–19, 22–16, 9–19, 24–16

International Gymnastic Center, Shanghai

July 21
13:00

Lebanon	71–97	South Korea
Scoring by quarter: 19–20, 20–29, 10–27, 22–21

International Gymnastic Center, Shanghai

July 21
15:00

Singapore	60–79	United Arab Emirates
Scoring by quarter: 17–21, 18–22, 14–18, 11–18

International Gymnastic Center, Shanghai

July 22
13:00

South Korea	85–50	United Arab Emirates
Scoring by quarter: 20–12, 18–13, 18–19, 29–6

International Gymnastic Center, Shanghai

July 22
18:30

Singapore	56–90	Lebanon
Scoring by quarter: 14–26, 10–18, 20–24, 12–22

International Gymnastic Center, Shanghai

=== Group C ===
Team	Pld	W	L	PF	PA	PD	Pts
Chinese Taipei	2	2	0	164	120	+44	4
India	2	1	1	118	146	−28	3
Uzbekistan	2	0	2	126	142	−16	2

July 20
15:00

Chinese Taipei	85–55	India
Scoring by quarter: 21–12, 18–15, 33–16, 13–12

International Gymnastic Center, Shanghai

July 21
9:00

India	63–61	Uzbekistan
Scoring by quarter: 10–11, 24–12, 23–20, 6–18

International Gymnastic Center, Shanghai

July 22
9:00

Uzbekistan	65–79	Chinese Taipei
Scoring by quarter: 11–21, 17–19, 26–20, 11–19

International Gymnastic Center, Shanghai

=== Group D ===
Team	Pld	W	L	PF	PA	PD	Pts
Syria	2	2	0	182	160	+22	4
Japan	2	1	1	151	153	−2	3
Kuwait	2	0	2	173	193	−20	2

July 20
9:00

Japan	86–78	Kuwait
Scoring by quarter: 25–22, 21–23, 18–8, 22–25

International Gymnastic Center, Shanghai

July 21
18:30

Kuwait	95–107	Syria
Scoring by quarter: 22–30, 26–27, 25–25, 22–25

International Gymnastic Center, Shanghai

July 22
11:00

Syria	75–65	Japan
Scoring by quarter: 19–15, 20–17, 17–13, 19–20

International Gymnastic Center, Shanghai

== Quarterfinal round ==
=== Group I ===
Team	Pld	W	L	PF	PA	PD	Pts
China	3	3	0	313	214	+99	6
Lebanon	3	2	1	246	232	+14	5
Japan	3	1	2	209	269	−60	4
Chinese Taipei	3	0	3	203	256	−53	3

July 23
18:30

Japan	69–60	Chinese Taipei
Scoring by quarter: 23–17, 11–13, 10–20, 25–10

International Gymnastic Center, Shanghai

July 23
20:30

Lebanon	76–87	China
Scoring by quarter: 14–23, 23–19, 18–23, 21–22

International Gymnastic Center, Shanghai

July 24
18:30

Chinese Taipei	72–87	Lebanon
Scoring by quarter: 22–23, 12–25, 25–24, 13–15

International Gymnastic Center, Shanghai

July 24
20:30

China	126–67	Japan
Scoring by quarter: 33–18, 25–12, 40–13, 28–24

International Gymnastic Center, Shanghai

July 25
15:00

Japan	73–83	Lebanon
Scoring by quarter: 17–25, 18–17, 14–21, 24–20

International Gymnastic Center, Shanghai

July 25
20:30

Chinese Taipei	71–100	China
Scoring by quarter: 16–27, 19–34, 15–24, 21–15

International Gymnastic Center, Shanghai

=== Group II ===
Team	Pld	W	L	PF	PA	PD	Pts
South Korea	3	3	0	271	219	+52	6
Syria	3	2	1	239	215	+24	5
Qatar	3	1	2	225	229	−4	4
India	3	0	3	198	270	−72	3

July 23
13:00

South Korea	89–72	Qatar
Scoring by quarter: 22–17, 19–21, 20–16, 28–18

International Gymnastic Center, Shanghai

July 23
15:00

Syria	88–62	India
Scoring by quarter: 16–14, 21–13, 29–9, 22–26

International Gymnastic Center, Shanghai

July 24
13:00

South Korea	85–71	Syria
Scoring by quarter: 12–21, 23–10, 28–26, 22–14

International Gymnastic Center, Shanghai

July 24
15:00

India	60–85	Qatar
Scoring by quarter: 15–17, 13–16, 16–25, 16–27

International Gymnastic Center, Shanghai

July 25
13:00

South Korea	97–76	India
Scoring by quarter: 24–11, 27–21, 19–20, 27–24

International Gymnastic Center, Shanghai

July 25
18:30

Qatar	68–80	Syria
Scoring by quarter: 16–22, 15–19, 20–21, 17–18

International Gymnastic Center, Shanghai

=== Group III ===
Team	Pld	W	L	PF	PA	PD	Pts
Uzbekistan	2	2	0	161	140	+21	4
Hong Kong	2	1	1	167	147	+20	3
Singapore	2	0	2	136	177	−41	2

July 23
9:00

Singapore	71–92	Hong Kong
Scoring by quarter: 18–30, 16–30, 18–16, 19–16

International Gymnastic Center, Shanghai

July 24
9:00

Uzbekistan	85–65	Singapore
Scoring by quarter: 18–27, 29–16, 14–7, 24–15

International Gymnastic Center, Shanghai

July 25
11:00

Hong Kong	75–76	Uzbekistan
Scoring by quarter: 13–28, 27–13, 21–18, 14–17

International Gymnastic Center, Shanghai

=== Group IV ===
Team	Pld	W	L	PF	PA	PD	Pts
United Arab Emirates	2	2	0	163	140	+23	4
Kuwait	2	1	1	154	135	+19	3
Thailand	2	0	2	118	160	−42	2

July 23
11:00

United Arab Emirates	83–63	Thailand
Scoring by quarter: 21–13, 17–17, 24–14, 21–19

International Gymnastic Center, Shanghai

July 24
11:00

Kuwait	77–80	United Arab Emirates
Scoring by quarter: 24–12, 15–20, 14–26, 24–22

International Gymnastic Center, Shanghai

July 25
9:00

Thailand	55–77	Kuwait
Scoring by quarter: 16–18, 12–23, 18–17, 9–19

International Gymnastic Center, Shanghai

== Classification 5th–14th ==
=== 13th place ===
July 27
11:00

Singapore	72–100	Thailand
Scoring by quarter: 14–32, 11–21, 18–19, 29–28

Shanghai Indoor Stadium, Shanghai

=== 11th place ===
July 27
13:00

Hong Kong	86–72	Kuwait
Scoring by quarter: 22–18, 17–17, 22–19, 25–18

Shanghai Indoor Stadium, Shanghai

=== 9th place ===
July 27
15:00

Uzbekistan	73–66	United Arab Emirates
Scoring by quarter: 18–13, 19–8, 22–33, 14–12

Shanghai Indoor Stadium, Shanghai

=== 7th place ===
July 28
12:00

Chinese Taipei	92–90 (OT)	India
Scoring by quarter: 24–24, 14–17, 17–25, 24–13, Overtime: 13–11

Shanghai Indoor Stadium, Shanghai

=== 5th place ===
July 28
14:00

Japan	65–74	Qatar
Scoring by quarter: 16–15, 20–20, 15–18, 14–21

Shanghai Indoor Stadium, Shanghai

== Final round ==
Finalists qualified for the 2002 FIBA World Championship.

Semifinals
July 27
Lebanon	75
South Korea	72
July 27
China	94
Syria	55

Final
July 28
Lebanon	63
China	97
3rd place
July 28
South Korea (OT)	95
Syria	94

=== Semifinals ===
July 27
18:30

Lebanon	75–72	South Korea
Scoring by quarter: 25–24, 17–13, 16–15, 17–20

Shanghai Indoor Stadium, Shanghai

July 27
20:30

China	94–55	Syria
Scoring by quarter: 17–11, 24–17, 27–12, 26–15

Shanghai Indoor Stadium, Shanghai

=== 3rd place ===
July 28
17:00

South Korea	95–94 (OT)	Syria
Scoring by quarter: 16–24, 23–23, 13–11, 28–22, Overtime: 15–14

Shanghai Indoor Stadium, Shanghai

=== Final ===
July 28
19:30

Lebanon	63–97	China
Scoring by quarter: 10–22, 17–27, 15–34, 21–14
Pts: El Khatib 18		Pts: Mengke B. 17

Shanghai Indoor Stadium, Shanghai

== Final standings ==
Qualified for the 2002 FIBA World Championship

Rank	Team	Record
1st place, gold medalist(s)	China	8–0
2nd place, silver medalist(s)	Lebanon	5–3
3rd place, bronze medalist(s)	South Korea	7–1
4	Syria	4–3
5	Qatar	4–3
6	Japan	2–4
7	Chinese Taipei	3–3
8	India	1–5
9	Uzbekistan	3–2
10	United Arab Emirates	3–3
11	Hong Kong	3–3
12	Kuwait	1–4
13	Thailand	1–5
14	Singapore	0–6

== Awards ==
2001 Asian champions

China
Twelfth title

- Most Valuable Player: (China) Yao Ming
- Best Playmaker: (Lebanon) Walid Doumiati
- Best Rebounder: (China) Yao Ming
- Best 3-Pointer: (South Korea) Yang Kyun-Min
- Best Coach: (United States) Johnny Neumann (Lebanon) and (China) Wang Fei
- Sportsmanship Award: (Syria) Michael Madanly

All-Star Team:

- (China) Yao Ming
- (China) Wang Zhizhi
- (Lebanon) Fadi El Khatib
- (Lebanon) Walid Doumiati
- (South Korea) Seo Jang-Hoon
