= Macau women's national basketball team =

Macau
- FIBA ranking: NR (14 September 2026)
- Joined FIBA: 1979
- FIBA zone: FIBA Asia
- National federation: Macau - China Basketball Association
- Coach: Wong Hong Tok

FIBA Asia Championship for Women
- Appearances: 4
- Medals: None
Home	Away

The Macau women's national basketball team is a national basketball team of Macau, organized and run by the Macau - China Basketball Association. (Chinese:中国澳门篮球总会)

== See also ==
- Macau women's national under-19 basketball team
- Macau women's national under-17 basketball team
