= 2018 William Jones Cup =

Basketball tournament in Taiwan

Tournament information
- Dates: M: 14–22 July 2018; W: 25–29 July 2018
- Host: Taiwan
- Venue: 1
- Teams: M: 9 W: 6
- Website: 2018 William Jones Cup

Final positions
- Champions: M: (Canada) 3D Global Sports (2nd title, 3rd title for country); W: New Zealand (1st title for country)
- 1st runners-up: M: Iran B W: Japan B
- 2nd runners-up: M: South Korea; W: Republic of China A

The 2018 William Jones Cup was the 40th staging of William Jones Cup, an international basketball tournament held in New Taipei City, Taiwan.

The men's tournament was held from 14–22 July 2018 with 11 teams participating. The women's tournament was held from 25–29 July 2018 and was contested by six teams. Both tournaments were held at the Xinzhuang Gymnasium in New Taipei City and followed a single round robin format.

== Men's tournament ==
=== Participating teams ===
- 3D Global Sports Canada
- Chinese Taipei Blue
- Chinese Taipei White
- ~~India~~
- Indonesia
- Iran B
- Japan B
- (Lithuania) LSU-Atletas
- (Philippines) Ateneo Blue Eagles
- South Korea

=== Team standings ===
Pos	Team	Pld	W	L	PF	PA	PD	Pts
1	(Canada) 3D Global Sports	8	7	1	706	591	+115	15 (Note: 3D Global Sports 77–67 Iran B)
2	Iran B	8	7	1	626	511	+115	15
3	South Korea	8	6	2	735	653	+82	14
4	(Philippines) Ateneo Blue Eagles	8	5	3	645	603	+42	13 (Note: Ateneo Blue Eagles 77–76 Chinese Taipei Blue)
5	Chinese Taipei Blue (H)	8	5	3	634	598	+36	13
6	Japan B	8	3	5	629	618	+11	11
7	(Lithuania) LSU-Atletas	8	1	7	573	740	−167	9 (Note: LSU-Atletas 1–1, +4; Chinese Taipei White 1–1, –1; Indonesia 1–1, –3)
8	Chinese Taipei White (H)	8	1	7	572	710	−138	9
9	Indonesia	8	1	7	563	659	−96	9

Source: Official website
(H) Hosts

=== Games ===
==== Day 1 ====
14 July
13:00

Report

South Korea	92–86 (OT)	Indonesia
Scoring by quarter: 26–19, 16–23, 19–19, 18–18, Overtime: 13–7
Pts: Ratliffe 22; Rebs: Ratliffe 15; Asts: Kim S.H. 5		Pts: Grahita 21; Rebs: White 12; Asts: Prawiro 4

Xinzhuang Gymnasium, New Taipei City

14 July
15:00

Report

Iran B	76–48	(Lithuania) LSU-Atletas
Scoring by quarter: 21–12, 17–11, 17–13, 21–12
Pts: Dalirzahan 21; Rebs: Yousof Vand 12; Asts: Mozafarivanani 4		Pts: Vazalis 14; Rebs: Globys 13; Asts: Vazalis 3

Xinzhuang Gymnasium, New Taipei City

14 July
17:00

Report

Chinese Taipei White	73–83	(Canada) 3D Global Sports
Scoring by quarter: 20–24, 22–21, 19–21, 12–17
Pts: Lin C.C. 16; Rebs: Wang 8 Asts: Chen Y.J. 3		Pts: Thomas 15; Rebs: Stutz 12; Asts: Thomas 4

Xinzhuang Gymnasium, New Taipei City

14 July
19:30

Report

Chinese Taipei Blue	74–67	Japan B
Scoring by quarter: 14–16, 10–15, 27–19, 23–17
Pts: Liu 16; Rebs: Liu 9 Asts: Chen Y.C. 9		Pts: Nishikawa 19; Rebs: Nakanishi 9 Asts: Vendrame 4

Xinzhuang Gymnasium, New Taipei City

==== Day 2 ====
15 July
13:00

Report

Indonesia	59–88	(Canada) 3D Global Sports
Scoring by quarter: 13–19, 5–19, 27–23, 14–27
Pts: White 23; Rebs: White 10; Asts: four players 2 each		Pts: Wood 17; Rebs: Kyser, Post 11; Asts: Campbell 6

Xinzhuang Gymnasium, New Taipei City

15 July
15:00

Report

Iran B	78–61	Japan B
Scoring by quarter: 20–16, 15–14, 26–21, 17–10
Pts: Dalirzahan 24; Rebs: Khandanpour 8 Asts: Mozafarivanani 8		Pts: Hashimoto, Nakanishi 14; Rebs: Nakanishi 6 Asts: Toews 4

Xinzhuang Gymnasium, New Taipei City

15 July
17:00

Report

Chinese Taipei White	64–87	(Philippines) Ateneo Blue Eagles
Scoring by quarter: 20–26, 13–22, 19–19, 12–20
Pts: Kao 16; Rebs: Wang 7 Asts: Lin C.C., Wu 2		Pts: Ravena 17; Rebs: Kouame 18; Asts: Navarro, Verano 3

Xinzhuang Gymnasium, New Taipei City

15 July
19:00

Report

LSU-Atletas (Lithuania)	83–106	Chinese Taipei Blue
Scoring by quarter: 21–32, 16–16, 29–24, 17–34
Pts: Paulauskas 20; Rebs: Rimša 7 Asts: Jocys 6		Pts: Zheng 25; Rebs: Lee 7 Asts: Chen 9

Xinzhuang Gymnasium, New Taipei City

==== Day 3 ====
16 July
13:00

Report

Japan B	88–55	Indonesia
Scoring by quarter: 25–16, 17–11, 19–17, 27–11
Pts: Hashimoto, Hiraiwa 14; Rebs: Schafer 12; Asts: Vendrame 6		Pts: Prawiro 10; Rebs: White 11; Asts: Prawiro, White 3

Xinzhuang Gymnasium, New Taipei City

16 July
15:00

Report

LSU-Atletas (Lithuania)	63–98	(Canada) 3D Global Sports
Scoring by quarter: 18–31, 18–20, 10–24, 17–23
Pts: Rimša 15; Rebs: Rimša 8 Asts: Jocys 4		Pts: Gueye 25; Rebs: Gueye 9 Asts: Campbell, Keith 4

Xinzhuang Gymnasium, New Taipei City

16 July
17:00

Report

Ateneo Blue Eagles (Philippines)	73–90	South Korea
Scoring by quarter: 22–26, 19–24, 19–20, 13–20
Pts: Ravena 14; Rebs: Kouame 16; Asts: Verano 5		Pts: Heo I.Y., Ratliffe 15; Rebs: Ratliffe 7 Asts: Kim S.H. 8

Xinzhuang Gymnasium, New Taipei City

16 July
19:00

Report

Chinese Taipei Blue	80–62	Chinese Taipei White
Scoring by quarter: 13–15, 25–15, 19–11, 23–21
Pts: Huang 19; Rebs: Chou 11; Asts: Hu, Peng 4		Pts: Wu 11; Rebs: Kao, Tseng 9 Asts: Lin C.C., Wu 3

Xinzhuang Gymnasium, New Taipei City

==== Day 4 ====
17 July
13:00

Report

South Korea	108–87	(Lithuania) LSU-Atletas
Scoring by quarter: 39–20, 23–13, 20–24, 26–30
Pts: Ratliffe 18; Rebs: Ratliffe 8 Asts: Kim S.H. 11		Pts: Jocys 25; Rebs: Rimša 9 Asts: Jocys 7

Xinzhuang Gymnasium, New Taipei City

17 July
15:00

Report

3D Global Sports (Canada)	86–78	(Philippines) Ateneo Blue Eagles
Scoring by quarter: 35–14, 16–13, 17–27, 18–24
Pts: Keith 18; Rebs: Post 9 Asts: Campbell 6		Pts: Ma. Nieto 18; Rebs: Ravena 9 Asts: three players 2 each

Xinzhuang Gymnasium, New Taipei City

17 July
17:00

Report

Indonesia	87–75	Chinese Taipei White
Scoring by quarter: 21–16, 25–24, 17–15, 24–20
Pts: Wisnu 21; Rebs: White 10; Asts: White 4		Pts: Lin C.C., Wu 12; Rebs: Tseng 6 Asts: Chen Y.J. 4

Xinzhuang Gymnasium, New Taipei City

17 July
19:00

Report

Iran B	87–75	Chinese Taipei Blue
Scoring by quarter: 25–18, 13–18, 27–13, 22–26
Pts: Yousof Vand 30; Rebs: Yousof Vand 12; Asts: Mozafarivanani 5		Pts: Liu 15; Rebs: Chen Y.C. 7 Asts: Chen Y.C., Chou P.C. 3

Xinzhuang Gymnasium, New Taipei City

==== Day 5 ====
18 July
13:00

Report

Indonesia	68–83	(Lithuania) LSU-Atletas
Scoring by quarter: 12–16, 19–21, 17–24, 20–22
Pts: Wisnu 17; Rebs: Wisnu 6 Asts: Prastawa, Prawiro 2		Pts: Sabecka 25; Rebs: Paulauskas, Rimša 12; Asts: Jocys 5

Xinzhuang Gymnasium, New Taipei City

18 July
15:00

Report

3D Global Sports (Canada)	77–67	Iran B
Scoring by quarter: 14–22, 27–11, 21–9, 15–25
Pts: Thomas 32; Rebs: Thomas 10; Asts: Campbell 4		Pts: Dalirzahan, Monji 15; Rebs: Yousof Vand 11; Asts: Mozafarivanani 4

Xinzhuang Gymnasium, New Taipei City

18 July
17:00

Report

Japan B	74–80	(Philippines) Ateneo Blue Eagles
Scoring by quarter: 13–21, 18–16, 24–23, 19–20
Pts: Sato 12; Rebs: Imamura 8 Asts: Namizato 7		Pts: Kouame 15; Rebs: Kouame 14; Asts: three players 2 each

Xinzhuang Gymnasium, New Taipei City

18 July
19:00

Report

Chinese Taipei White	84–103	South Korea
Scoring by quarter: 19–21, 24–24, 24–30, 17–28
Pts: Tseng 24; Rebs: Tseng 10; Asts: Kao 5		Pts: Jeon 25; Rebs: Lee S.H. 5 Asts: Park 8

Xinzhuang Gymnasium, New Taipei City

==== Day 6 ====
19 July
13:00

Report

Ateneo Blue Eagles (Philippines)	89–78	Indonesia
Scoring by quarter: 24–19, 17–25, 35–18, 13–16
Pts: Go 21; Rebs: Ravena 8 Asts: Tio 6		Pts: White 23; Rebs: White 9 Asts: Gemilang, White 5

Xinzhuang Gymnasium, New Taipei City

19 July
15:00

Report

LSU-Atletas (Lithuania)	64–95	Japan B
Scoring by quarter: 10–19, 9–27, 19–26, 26–23
Pts: Rimša 30; Rebs: Paulauskas 11; Asts: Sabecka 5		Pts: four players 12 each Rebs: Schafer 5 Asts: Vendrame 7

Xinzhuang Gymnasium, New Taipei City

19 July
17:00

Report

South Korea	69–80	Iran B
Scoring by quarter: 12–20, 23–18, 15–22, 19–20
Pts: Ratliffe 30; Rebs: Ratliffe 8 Asts: four players 3 each		Pts: Dalirzahan 23; Rebs: Bahramzad, Yousof Vand 6 Asts: Mozafarivanani 10

Xinzhuang Gymnasium, New Taipei City

19 July
19:00

Report

3D Global Sports (Canada)	81–68	Chinese Taipei Blue
Scoring by quarter: 23–12, 19–22, 22–22, 17–12
Pts: Thomas 16; Rebs: Gueye 13; Asts: Keith 8		Pts: Liu 10; Rebs: Liu 8 Asts: Chen Y.C. 5

Xinzhuang Gymnasium, New Taipei City

==== Day 7 ====
20 July
13:00

Report

Iran B	102–56	Chinese Taipei White
Scoring by quarter: 30–11, 23–16, 26–16, 23–13
Pts: Torabi 18; Rebs: Yousof Vand 12; Asts: Mozafarivanani 6		Pts: Chen Y.J. 13; Rebs: Tseng 6 Asts: three players 3 each

Xinzhuang Gymnasium, New Taipei City

20 July
15:00

Report

Japan B	72–101	South Korea
Scoring by quarter: 14–25, 18–20, 21–27, 19–29
Pts: Imamura 12; Rebs: Schafer 5 Asts: Vendrame 5		Pts: Lee J.H. 22; Rebs: Kang 8 Asts: Park 10

Xinzhuang Gymnasium, New Taipei City

20 July
17:00

Report

Ateneo Blue Eagles (Philippines)	98–65	(Lithuania) LSU-Atletas
Scoring by quarter: 22–17, 21–11, 30–18, 25–19
Pts: Navarro 20; Rebs: Ravena 8 Asts: Navarro 5		Pts: Jocys 20; Rebs: Neimantas 11; Asts: Vazalis 6

Xinzhuang Gymnasium, New Taipei City

20 July
19:00

Report

Chinese Taipei Blue	78–68	Indonesia
Scoring by quarter: 21–20, 26–16, 19–21, 12–11
Pts: Hu 13; Rebs: four players 5 each Asts: Peng 6		Pts: Wisnu 14; Rebs: White 12; Asts: Prastawa, White 4

Xinzhuang Gymnasium, New Taipei City

==== Day 8 ====
21 July
13:00

Report

Indonesia	62–66	Iran B
Scoring by quarter: 18–23, 9–14, 18–13, 17–16
Pts: White 23; Rebs: Prastawa 8 Asts: White 3		Pts: Dalirzahan 18; Rebs: Khandanpour 9 Asts: Mozafarivanani 7

Xinzhuang Gymnasium, New Taipei City

21 July
15:00

Report

3D Global Sports (Canada)	94–99	South Korea
Scoring by quarter: 22–24, 19–23, 24–24, 29–28
Pts: Keith 23; Rebs: Kyser 10; Asts: Keith 6		Pts: Ratliffe 34; Rebs: Ratliffe 14; Asts: Kim S.H. 8

Xinzhuang Gymnasium, New Taipei City

21 July
17:00

Report

Japan B	88–67	Chinese Taipei White
Scoring by quarter: 26–13, 24–13, 14–19, 24–22
Pts: Schafer 14; Rebs: Schafer 16; Asts: Namizato 6		Pts: Kao 17; Rebs: Tseng 4 Asts: Lin C.C. 5

Xinzhuang Gymnasium, New Taipei City

21 July
19:00

Report

Ateneo Blue Eagles (Philippines)	77–76	Chinese Taipei Blue
Scoring by quarter: 18–18, 18–17, 21–21, 20–20
Pts: Ma. Nieto 13; Rebs: Navarro 9 Asts: Ravena 4		Pts: Liu 24; Rebs: Liu 10; Asts: Chen Y.C. 5

Xinzhuang Gymnasium, New Taipei City

==== Day 9 ====
22 July
13:00

Report

Japan B	84–99	(Canada) 3D Global Sports
Scoring by quarter: 22–32, 15–20, 26–24, 21–23
Pts: Imamura, Schafer 14; Rebs: Schafer 9 Asts: Vendrame 4		Pts: Thomas 25; Rebs: three players 8 each Asts: Keith 5

Xinzhuang Gymnasium, New Taipei City

22 July
15:00

Report

Iran B	70–63	(Philippines) Ateneo Blue Eagles
Scoring by quarter: 15–14, 16–25, 23–11, 16–13
Pts: Dalirzahan 26; Rebs: Sheikhi, Torabi 8 Asts: Mozafarivanani 8		Pts: Ma. Nieto 14; Rebs: Kouame 14; Asts: three players 3 each

Xinzhuang Gymnasium, New Taipei City

22 July
17:00

Report

Chinese Taipei White	91–80	(Lithuania) LSU-Atletas
Scoring by quarter: 19–20, 22–15, 32–24, 18–21
Pts: Chou 16; Rebs: Chien 5 Asts: Chou, Lin C.C. 6		Pts: Rimša 25; Rebs: Motuzas, Rimša 7 Asts: Vazalis 6

Xinzhuang Gymnasium, New Taipei City

22 July
19:00

Chinese Taipei Blue	77–73	South Korea
Scoring by quarter: 21–17, 18–21, 18–23, 20–12
Pts: Liu 25; Rebs: Liu 13; Asts: Creighton 7		Pts: Heo I.Y., Kang 12; Rebs: Ratliffe 7 Asts: Heo H., Lee J.H. 6

Xinzhuang Gymnasium, New Taipei City

== Women's tournament ==
=== Participating teams ===
- Republic of China A
- Republic of China B
- India
- Japan B
- New Zealand
- South Korea

=== Team standings ===
Pos	Team	Pld	W	L	PF	PA	PD	Pts
1	New Zealand	5	5	0	449	315	+134	10
2	Japan B	5	4	1	443	307	+136	9
3	Republic of China A (H)	5	3	2	367	323	+44	8
4	South Korea	5	2	3	393	352	+41	7
5	Republic of China B (H)	5	1	4	332	410	−78	6
6	India	5	0	5	232	509	−277	5

Source: Official website
(H) Hosts

=== Games ===
==== Day 1 ====
25 July
15:00

Report

New Zealand	114–39	India
Scoring by quarter: 34–8, 22–9, 33–15, 25–7
Pts: Karaitiana 38; Rebs: Davidson 15; Asts: Beck 7		Pts: Sidhu 10; Rebs: Jeena 11; Asts: five players 1 each

Xinzhuang Gymnasium, New Taipei City

25 July
17:00

Report

South Korea	81–64	Republic of China B
Scoring by quarter: 24–17, 17–11, 28–12, 12–24
Pts: Kim H.B. 17; Rebs: Kim H.B. 8 Asts: Park 9		Pts: Liu 17; Rebs: Su 10; Asts: Lin X. F., Wei 3

Xinzhuang Gymnasium, New Taipei City

25 July
19:30

Report

Republic of China A	55–88	Japan B
Scoring by quarter: 9–22, 17–26, 17–19, 12–21
Pts: Huang P.J. 16; Rebs: Huang P.J. 6 Asts: Chen Y.C., Peng 2		Pts: Hayashi, Nakada 16; Rebs: Nakada 11; Asts: Miyazaki, Yasuma 8

Xinzhuang Gymnasium, New Taipei City

==== Day 2 ====
26 July
15:00

Report

Japan B	94–38	India
Scoring by quarter: 29–11, 19–13, 28–9, 18–5
Pts: three players 11 each Rebs: Nakada 10; Asts: Shinozaki 6		Pts: Hemmige Mahesha 9 Rebs: Nixon 7 Asts: Limaye 2

Xinzhuang Gymnasium, New Taipei City

26 July
17:00

Report

New Zealand	93–74	South Korea
Scoring by quarter: 28–19, 22–22, 20–18, 23–15
Pts: Karaitiana 23; Rebs: Purcell 14; Asts: Beck 11		Pts: Kang 17; Rebs: Choi 8 Asts: Park H.J. 11

Xinzhuang Gymnasium, New Taipei City

26 July
19:00

Report

Republic of China B	52–72	Republic of China A
Scoring by quarter: 16–21, 11–24, 12–14, 13–13
Pts: Liu 14; Rebs: Lin T. 8 Asts: Liu 5		Pts: Zheng 10; Rebs: Zheng 7 Asts: Wu 5

Xinzhuang Gymnasium, New Taipei City

==== Day 3 ====
27 July
15:00

Report

South Korea	108–41	India
Scoring by quarter: 19–13, 29–6, 26–10, 34–12
Pts: Choi 22; Rebs: Go 7 Asts: Sim 8		Pts: Rajaganapathi 14; Rebs: Limaye 9 Asts: Limaye 5

Xinzhuang Gymnasium, New Taipei City

27 July
17:00

Report

Republic of China B	59–109	Japan B
Scoring by quarter: 10–23, 13–25, 23–29, 13–32
Pts: Liu 15; Rebs: Lin T. 8 Asts: Chiu 4		Pts: Shinozaki 18; Rebs: Umezawa 12; Asts: Yasuma 8

Xinzhuang Gymnasium, New Taipei City

27 July
19:00

Report

Republic of China A	62–69	New Zealand
Scoring by quarter: 14–17, 16–18, 15–20, 17–14
Pts: Lin 16; Rebs: Zheng 10; Asts: three players 4 each		Pts: Beck 28; Rebs: Purcell 14; Asts: Beck, Purcell 4

Xinzhuang Gymnasium, New Taipei City

==== Day 4 ====
28 July
15:00

Report

New Zealand	88–66	Republic of China B
Scoring by quarter: 19–22, 20–20, 30–13, 19–11
Pts: Davidson 18; Rebs: Davidson 15; Asts: Beck 7		Pts: Wei 28; Rebs: Liu 6 Asts: Chiu, Liu 5

Xinzhuang Gymnasium, New Taipei City

28 July
17:00

Report

Japan B	78–70	South Korea
Scoring by quarter: 19–12, 26–17, 17–19, 16–22
Pts: Hayashi, Umezawa 17; Rebs: Hayashi, Umezawa 5 Asts: Miyazaki 11		Pts: Lim 17; Rebs: Choi 7 Asts: Park 7

Xinzhuang Gymnasium, New Taipei City

28 July
19:00

Report

India	54–102	Republic of China A
Scoring by quarter: 9–25, 12–24, 25–31, 8–22
Pts: Jeena 17; Rebs: Jeena, Rajaganapathi 6 Asts: Kaur 5		Pts: Huang Y.L. 15; Rebs: Han 8 Asts: Peng H.T. 10

Xinzhuang Gymnasium, New Taipei City

==== Day 5 ====
29 July
15:00

Report

Japan B	74–85	New Zealand
Scoring by quarter: 24–21, 22–14, 16–22, 12–28
Pts: Shinozaki 20; Rebs: Umezawa 8 Asts: Miyazaki 8		Pts: Karaitiana 25; Rebs: Purcell 10; Asts: Beck 7

Xinzhuang Gymnasium, New Taipei City

29 July
17:00

Report

Republic of China B	91–60	India
Scoring by quarter: 25–10, 19–11, 19–24, 28–15
Pts: Wei 20; Rebs: three players 6 each Asts: three players 5 each		Pts: Senthil Kumar 16; Rebs: Nixon 12; Asts: Hemmige Mahesha, Senthil Kumar 4

Xinzhuang Gymnasium, New Taipei City

29 July
19:00

Report

Republic of China A	76–60	South Korea
Scoring by quarter: 16–15, 22–13, 15–18, 23–14
Pts: Peng 19; Rebs: Zheng 6 Asts: Lin, Wang 3		Pts: Lim 20; Rebs: Park H.J. 7 Asts: Lim 4

Xinzhuang Gymnasium, New Taipei City
