= 2016 William Jones Cup =

Basketball tournament in New Taipei City, Taiwan

Tournament information
- Location: New Taipei
- Dates: M: 23–31 July 2016; W: 3–7 August 2016
- Host: Taiwan
- Teams: M: 9 W: 6
- Website: http://jonescup.choxue.com/

Final positions
- Champions: M: Mighty Sports; W: South Korea
- 1st runners-up: M: South Korea; W: Japan
- 2nd runners-up: M: Chinese Taipei A W: Chinese Taipei A
- MVP: (United States) Dewarick Spencer (Mighty Sports)

The 2016 William Jones Cup was the 38th staging of William Jones Cup, an international basketball tournament. The men's tournament was held from 23–31 July 2016 at the Hsinchuang Gymnasium in New Taipei City, Taiwan. The women's tournament was held from 3–7 August 2016.

Mighty Sports won the cup with two games to spare, securing the fifth overall championship for the Philippines.

== Men's tournament ==
=== Participating teams ===
- ~~(Canada) 3D Global Sports~~
- (United States) Sacramento State Hornets
- Chinese Taipei A
- Chinese Taipei B
- Egypt
- India
- Iran
- Japan
- (Philippines) Mighty Sports
- South Korea

=== Team standings ===
Team	Pld	W	L	PF	PA	PD	Pts	Tie
(Philippines) Mighty Sports	8	8	0	715	576	+139	16	
South Korea	8	6	2	592	490	+102	14	
Chinese Taipei A (Blue)	8	5	3	614	572	+42	13	1–0
Iran	8	5	3	547	519	+28	13	0–1
(United States) Sacramento State Hornets	8	3	5	524	548	−24	11	1–1; 1.11
Egypt	8	3	5	555	589	−34	11	1–1; 1.01
Japan	8	3	5	514	579	−65	11	1–1; 0.89
Chinese Taipei B (White)	8	2	6	557	643	−86	10	
India	8	1	7	536	638	−102	9	

==== Day 1 ====
23 July
15:00

Report

South Korea	73–74	Egypt
Scoring by quarter: 16–24, 9–19, 21–17, 27–14
Pts: Byun, Lee S.H. 13; Rebs: Lee S.H. 7 Asts: Heo H. 5		Pts: El-Gammal 21; Rebs: Ibrahim 7 Asts: four players 2 each

Hsinchuang Gymnasium, New Taipei City

23 July
17:00

Report

Chinese Taipei B	61–73	Iran
Scoring by quarter: 18–13, 12–22, 15–19, 16–19
Pts: Huang T.H. 15; Rebs: Florveus 11; Asts: Wu C.C. 3		Pts: Yakhchali 18; Rebs: Mirzaei, Yakhchali 8 Asts: Yakhchali 4

Hsinchuang Gymnasium, New Taipei City

23 July
19:30

Report

Chinese Taipei A	76–55	Japan
Scoring by quarter: 17–17, 14–10, 23–16, 22–12
Pts: Liu 21; Rebs: Davis 12; Asts: Chen S.N. 5		Pts: Nagayoshi 14; Rebs: Mitsuhara 7 Asts: Togashi 4

Hsinchuang Gymnasium, New Taipei City

23 July
21:30

Report

India	60–62	(United States) Sacramento State Hornets
Scoring by quarter: 13–12, 14–14, 21–23, 12–13
Pts: Pethani 23; Rebs: Pethani 11; Asts: Bhriguvanshi, Amj. Singh 6		Pts: Strings 22; Rebs: Stuteville 15; Asts: Graves 4

Hsinchuang Gymnasium, New Taipei City

==== Day 2 ====
24 July
13:00

Report

Egypt	74–79	Chinese Taipei B
Scoring by quarter: 14–22, 27–16, 19–16, 14–25
Pts: Gendy 22; Rebs: Gendy 9 Asts: El-Gammal 7		Pts: Huang T.H. 19; Rebs: Yang H.C. 8 Asts: Wu C.C. 6

Hsinchuang Gymnasium, New Taipei City

24 July
15:00

Report

Japan	89–70	India
Scoring by quarter: 22–19, 23–9, 29–21, 15–21
Pts: Kumagae 17; Rebs: Nagayoshi, Nomoto 5 Asts: Togashi 6		Pts: Bhriguvanshi, Amj. Singh 16; Rebs: Annadurai 9 Asts: Bhriguvanshi 5

Hsinchuang Gymnasium, New Taipei City

24 July
17:00

Report

Sacramento State Hornets (United States)	48–63	South Korea
Scoring by quarter: 19–21, 7–15, 10–16, 12–11
Pts: Hornsby, Strings 10; Rebs: Hornsby 10; Asts: Graves, Wu 2		Pts: Byun 11; Rebs: Heo H. 5 Asts: Heo H. 4

Hsinchuang Gymnasium, New Taipei City

24 July
19:00

Report

Mighty Sports (Philippines)	89–81	Chinese Taipei A
Scoring by quarter: 14–27, 26–10, 25–15, 24–29
Pts: Spencer 27; Rebs: N'Diaye, Singletary 9 Asts: Brickman 5		Pts: Liu 25; Rebs: Chou Y.H., Liu 8 Asts: Chen Y.C. 4

Hsinchuang Gymnasium, New Taipei City

==== Day 3 ====
25 July
13:00

Report

Japan	71–66	Egypt
Scoring by quarter: 19–13, 13–14, 11–15, 28–24
Pts: Togashi 18; Rebs: Endo 7 Asts: Shinoyama 6		Pts: Nasar 13; Rebs: Ibrahim 7 Asts: Gendy, El-Gammal 3

Hsinchuang Gymnasium, New Taipei City

25 July
15:00

Report

Iran	70–59	(United States) Sacramento State Hornets
Scoring by quarter: 12–12, 17–16, 24–18, 17–13
Pts: Yakhchali 17; Rebs: Mashayekhi 5 Asts: Torabi, Yakhchali 3		Pts: Strings 16; Rebs: Strings 9 Asts: Graves 5

Hsinchuang Gymnasium, New Taipei City

25 July
17:00

Report

South Korea	65–86	(Philippines) Mighty Sports
Scoring by quarter: 18–22, 13–23, 14–14, 20–27
Pts: Heo I.Y., Kim J.K., Lee S.H. 11; Rebs: Kang 6 Asts: Heo H. 5		Pts: Thornton 24; Rebs: N'Diaye 8 Asts: Graham 3

Hsinchuang Gymnasium, New Taipei City

25 July
19:00

Report

Chinese Taipei A	76–70 (OT)	India
Scoring by quarter: 22–17, 14–14, 11–14, 19–21, Overtime: 10–4
Pts: Liu 18; Rebs: Davis 16; Asts: Chang Y.A., Chen Y.C. 3		Pts: Amj. Singh 18; Rebs: Pethani 17; Asts: Bhriguvanshi 4

Hsinchuang Gymnasium, New Taipei City

==== Day 4 ====
26 July
13:00

Report

Egypt	65–74	Iran
Scoring by quarter: 22–17, 17–23, 5–19, 21–15
Pts: El-Sabagh, Gendy 17; Rebs: El-Mekawi, Gendy 5 Asts: El-Gammal 3		Pts: Arghavan 24; Rebs: Arghavan 9 Asts: Yakhchali 4

Hsinchuang Gymnasium, New Taipei City

26 July
15:00

Report

India	55–97	South Korea
Scoring by quarter: 9–29, 14–19, 14–24, 18–25
Pts: Bhriguvanshi 9 Rebs: Annadurai, T. Singh 5 Asts: T. Singh 5		Pts: Heo U. 19; Rebs: four players 5 each Asts: Heo H. 5

Hsinchuang Gymnasium, New Taipei City

26 July
17:00

Report

Sacramento State Hornets (United States)	69–88	(Philippines) Mighty Sports
Scoring by quarter: 23–23, 12–31, 15–15, 19–19
Pts: Dressler 16; Rebs: Patton 9 Asts: Graves, Jackson 3		Pts: Macklin, Spencer 14; Rebs: Singletary 7 Asts: Brickman 5

Hsinchuang Gymnasium, New Taipei City

26 July
19:00

Report

Chinese Taipei B	81–80	Chinese Taipei A
Scoring by quarter: 26–18, 19–20, 20–17, 16–25
Pts: Yang H.C. 22; Rebs: Florveus 16; Asts: Huang T.H., Wu C.C. 4		Pts: Liu 26; Rebs: Davis 8 Asts: Chen S.N. 6

Hsinchuang Gymnasium, New Taipei City

==== Day 5 ====
27 July
13:00

Report

Egypt	79–67	India
Scoring by quarter: 11–16, 25–13, 24–22, 19–16
Pts: Nasar 19; Rebs: Nasar 7 Asts: El-Gammal, Mohamed 4		Pts: Amr. Singh 22; Rebs: Annadurai 10; Asts: Bhriguvanshi 5

Hsinchuang Gymnasium, New Taipei City

27 July
15:00

Report

South Korea	67–50	Iran
Scoring by quarter: 12–9, 21–13, 16–17, 18–11
Pts: Heo I.Y., Kim S.H. 15; Rebs: Kim J.K, Lee S.H. 6 Asts: Heo H., Lee S.H. 4		Pts: Yakhchali 13; Rebs: Arghavan 5 Asts: Aslani 4

Hsinchuang Gymnasium, New Taipei City

27 July
17:00

Report

Mighty Sports (Philippines)	87–66	Japan
Scoring by quarter: 28–12, 22–9, 20–26, 17–19
Pts: Graham 15; Rebs: N'Diaye 10; Asts: Spencer 5		Pts: Nishikawa 15; Rebs: Mitsuhara 10; Asts: Fujii 7

Hsinchuang Gymnasium, New Taipei City

27 July
19:00

Report

Sacramento State Hornets (United States)	81–60	Chinese Taipei B
Scoring by quarter: 15–20, 19–18, 19–9, 28–13
Pts: Strings 24; Rebs: Strings 8 Asts: Graves 4		Pts: Florveus 17; Rebs: Florveus 11; Asts: Chien C.Y. 3

Hsinchuang Gymnasium, New Taipei City

==== Day 6 ====
28 July
13:00

Report

India	81–101	(Philippines) Mighty Sports
Scoring by quarter: 27–23, 21–25, 11–31, 22–22
Pts: Amr. Singh 18; Rebs: Amj. Singh 13; Asts: Amj. Singh 4		Pts: Thornton 30; Rebs: Spencer 10; Asts: Spencer 12

Hsinchuang Gymnasium, New Taipei City

28 July
15:00

Report

Egypt	70–63	(United States) Sacramento State Hornets
Scoring by quarter: 15–13, 15–11, 20–15, 20–24
Pts: Kamal 17; Rebs: Kamal 16; Asts: Gendy, El-Sabagh, Kamal 2		Pts: Battaglia 15; Rebs: Dressler 10; Asts: Dressler, Jackson, Ugbaja 2

Hsinchuang Gymnasium, New Taipei City

28 July
17:00

Report

Chinese Taipei B	68–72	Japan
Scoring by quarter: 13–19, 20–13, 21–15, 14–25
Pts: Chien Y.C. 15; Rebs: Florveus 20; Asts: Wu C.C. 5		Pts: Fujii 12; Rebs: Fujii 9 Asts: Fujii 6

Hsinchuang Gymnasium, New Taipei City

28 July
19:00

Report

Iran	63–66	Chinese Taipei A
Scoring by quarter: 15–11, 13–20, 13–18, 22–17
Pts: Yakhchali 23; Rebs: Mashayekhi 11; Asts: Mirzaei 3		Pts: Yang C.M. 16; Rebs: Davis 13; Asts: Chen Y.C., Chou Y.H., Liu 2

Hsinchuang Gymnasium, New Taipei City

==== Day 7 ====
29 July
13:00

Report

India	77–63	Chinese Taipei B
Scoring by quarter: 17–16, 13–23, 28–14, 19–10
Pts: Bhriguvanshi 27; Rebs: Amj. Singh 17; Asts: Bhriguvanshi, Pari, Amj. Singh 4		Pts: Yang H.C. 18; Rebs: Florveus 14; Asts: Wu C.C. 9

Hsinchuang Gymnasium, New Taipei City

29 July
15:00

Report

Mighty Sports (Philippines)	80–73	Iran
Scoring by quarter: 20–10, 16–14, 17–28, 27–21
Pts: Thornton 24; Rebs: Thornton 10; Asts: Spencer 5		Pts: Doraghi 20; Rebs: Yousofvand 7 Asts: Mozafarivanani 5

Hsinchuang Gymnasium, New Taipei City

29 July
17:00

Report

Japan	45–68	South Korea
Scoring by quarter: 13–18, 9–13, 15–21, 8–16
Pts: Fujii 12; Rebs: Mitsuhara, Nagayoshi 5 Asts: Fujii 4		Pts: Lee S.H. 17; Rebs: Kim J.K. 8 Asts: Heo H. 4

Hsinchuang Gymnasium, New Taipei City

29 July
19:00

Report

Chinese Taipei A	82–66	Egypt
Scoring by quarter: 21–19, 10–22, 24–13, 27–12
Pts: Davis 23; Rebs: Davis, Liu 9 Asts: Chen Y.C. 8		Pts: Gendy 15; Rebs: Gendy 9 Asts: El-Sadani 2

Hsinchuang Gymnasium, New Taipei City

==== Day 8 ====
30 July
13:00

Report

Iran	73–65	Japan
Scoring by quarter: 22–5, 10–21, 26–22, 15–17
Pts: Arghavan 19; Rebs: Arghavan 9 Asts: Yakhchali 6		Pts: Togashi 25; Rebs: Mitsuhara 10; Asts: Mitsuhara 5

Hsinchuang Gymnasium, New Taipei City

30 July
15:00

Report

Egypt	61–80	(Philippines) Mighty Sports
Scoring by quarter: 12–14, 16–21, 19–17, 14–28
Pts: Gendy 24; Rebs: Gendy 12; Asts: Kamal, Shousha 3		Pts: Thornton 20; Rebs: Thornton 15; Asts: Brickman 5

Hsinchuang Gymnasium, New Taipei City

30 July
17:00

Report

South Korea	82–65	Chinese Taipei B
Scoring by quarter: 26–16, 19–5, 15–20, 22–24
Pts: Heo U. 16; Rebs: Heo U. 8 Asts: Lee S.H. 6		Pts: Florveus 17; Rebs: Florvues 13; Asts: Wu C.C. 4

Hsinchuang Gymnasium, New Taipei City

30 July
19:00

Report

Sacramento State Hornets (United States)	71–86	Chinese Taipei A
Scoring by quarter: 12–12, 16–20, 15–25, 28–29
Pts: Wu 17; Rebs: Hornsby 14; Asts: Graves, Strings 5		Pts: Tien 17; Rebs: Davis 13; Asts: Liu 3

Hsinchuang Gymnasium, New Taipei City

==== Day 9 ====
31 July
13:00

Report

India	56–71	Iran
Scoring by quarter: 10–15, 21–17, 19–24, 6–15
Pts: Amr. Singh 22; Rebs: Amr. Singh 9 Asts: Bhriguvanshi, Pari 4		Pts: Yakhchali 15; Rebs: Arghavan 9 Asts: Arghavan, Mozafarivanani 6

Hsinchuang Gymnasium, New Taipei City

31 July
15:00

Report

Japan	51–71	(United States) Sacramento State Hornets
Scoring by quarter: 5–8, 18–21, 12–20, 16–22
Pts: Nishikawa 14; Rebs: Mitsuhara 10; Asts: Fujii, Kumagae 3		Pts: Strings 23; Rebs: Hornsby 11; Asts: Graves 6

Hsinchuang Gymnasium, New Taipei City

31 July
17:00

Report

Chinese Taipei B	80–104	(Philippines) Mighty Sports
Scoring by quarter: 16–30, 17–24, 28–33, 19–17
Pts: Chien Y.C. 18; Rebs: Florveus 18; Asts: Lee K.Y. 5		Pts: Spencer 27; Rebs: Spencer 9 Asts: Singletary 7

Hsinchuang Gymnasium, New Taipei City

31 July
19:00

Report

Chinese Taipei A	67–77	South Korea
Scoring by quarter: 14–17, 12–15, 21–25, 20–20
Pts: Liu 16; Rebs: Davis 12; Asts: Chang Y.A, Chen S.N., Liu 2		Pts: Kim J.K 28; Rebs: Kim J.K. 8 Asts: Heo H. 6

Hsinchuang Gymnasium, New Taipei City

== Women's tournament ==
=== Participating teams ===
- Chinese Taipei A
- Chinese Taipei B
- South Korea
- Japan
- Thailand
- United States WJC

=== Team standings ===
Team	Pld	W	L	PF	PA	PD	Pts	Tie
South Korea	5	4	1	301	281	+20	9	1–0
Japan	5	4	1	382	270	+112	9	0–1
Chinese Taipei A (Blue)	5	3	2	360	300	+60	8	1–0
United States WJC	5	3	2	357	344	+13	8	0–1
Chinese Taipei B (White)	5	1	4	351	368	−17	6	
Thailand	5	0	5	245	433	−188	5	

==== Day 1 ====
3 August
15:00

Report

Thailand	44–93	United States WJC
Scoring by quarter: 4–31, 13–15, 11–25, 16–22
Pts: Yothanan 8 Rebs: Yothanan 5 Asts: Kruatiwa 3		Pts: Harvin, King 27; Rebs: King 10; Asts: Harris 6

Hsinchuang Gymnasium, New Taipei City

3 August
17:00

Report

South Korea	65–58	Chinese Taipei B
Scoring by quarter: 18–18, 12–13, 15–13, 20–14
Pts: Kim D.B. 16; Rebs: Kwak 15; Asts: Kim D.B. 7		Pts: Wang W.L. 10; Rebs: Huang H.T. 7 Asts: Huang J.C., Lo, Wang W.L. 2

Hsinchuang Gymnasium, New Taipei City

3 August
19:30

Report

Chinese Taipei A	68–73	Japan
Scoring by quarter: 15–20, 24–23, 13–12, 16–18
Pts: Li Y.R. 16; Rebs: Lin C.W. 8 Asts: Lin C.W. 5		Pts: Mawuli 14; Rebs: Mawuli, Nishioka 7 Asts: Fujioka 7

Hsinchuang Gymnasium, New Taipei City

==== Day 2 ====
4 August
15:00

Report

Thailand	41–60	South Korea
Scoring by quarter: 11–14, 11–22, 3–9, 16–15
Pts: Prajuapsook 10; Rebs: Yothanan 7 Asts: Kruatiwa 3		Pts: four players 9 each Rebs: Kim Y.H. 7 Asts: Kim D.B. 2

Hsinchuang Gymnasium, New Taipei City

4 August
17:00

Report

Japan	92–53	United States WJC
Scoring by quarter: 18–9, 23–18, 19–13, 32–13
Pts: Hayashi 14; Rebs: four players 5 each Asts: Fujioka 8		Pts: King 13; Rebs: Ford 7 Asts: King 2

Hsinchuang Gymnasium, New Taipei City

4 August
19:00

Report

Chinese Taipei B	51–70	Chinese Taipei A
Scoring by quarter: 15–14, 8–21, 6–16, 22–19
Pts: Wang W.L. 9 Rebs: Wang W.L. 14; Asts: Huang J.C. 2		Pts: Liu H.Y. 17; Rebs: Lin C.W. 7 Asts: Pan T.Y., Peng S.C. 4

Hsinchuang Gymnasium, New Taipei City

==== Day 3 ====
5 August
15:00

Report

South Korea	55–63	United States WJC
Scoring by quarter: 14–20, 14–11, 16–17, 11–15
Pts: Kim D.B. 19; Rebs: Kim D.B. 12; Asts: Yoon 4		Pts: Harvin, King 15; Rebs: Harris 14; Asts: five players 1 each

Hsinchuang Gymnasium, New Taipei City

5 August
17:00

Report

Chinese Taipei B	58–71	Japan
Scoring by quarter: 15–17, 15–16, 19–20, 9–18
Pts: Huang L.C. 15; Rebs: Yang 7 Asts: Wang W.L. 3		Pts: Mawuli 22; Rebs: Mawuli 13; Asts: Fujioka 10

Hsinchuang Gymnasium, New Taipei City

5 August
19:00

Report

Chinese Taipei A	90–50	Thailand
Scoring by quarter: 27–13, 22–14, 25–14, 16–9
Pts: Liu H.Y., Peng S.C. 17; Rebs: Chen Y.C. 9 Asts: Lin H.F. 6		Pts: Thiratananitiworachot 18; Rebs: Thiratananitiworachot 7 Asts: Surin, Yothanan 4

Hsinchuang Gymnasium, New Taipei City

==== Day 4 ====
6 August
15:00

Report

Japan	56–57	South Korea
Scoring by quarter: 18–12, 14–10, 22–11, 2–24
Pts: Mawuli 21; Rebs: Onuma 8 Asts: Hayashi, Mawuli 3		Pts: Kim D.B. 13; Rebs: Yang 10; Asts: Yoon 5

Hsinchuang Gymnasium, New Taipei City

6 August
17:00

Report

Thailand	76–100	Chinese Taipei B
Scoring by quarter: 19–27, 24–28, 24–30, 9–15
Pts: Banmoo, Kruatiwa 13; Rebs: Yothanan 8 Asts: Kruatiwa 4		Pts: Huang L.C. 20; Rebs: Chen W.A., Huang Y.T. 5 Asts: Huang J.C. 5

Hsinchuang Gymnasium, New Taipei City

6 August
19:00

Report

United States WJC	62–69	Chinese Taipei A
Scoring by quarter: 17–22, 11–15, 10–16, 24–16
Pts: King 23; Rebs: Harris, King 14; Asts: Robinson 2		Pts: Wang L.Y. 16; Rebs: Lin C.W. 9 Asts: Huang F.S. 4

Hsinchuang Gymnasium, New Taipei City

==== Day 5 ====
7 August
15:00

Report

Japan	90–34	Thailand
Scoring by quarter: 17–6, 30–7, 20–13, 23–8
Pts: Akaho 17; Rebs: Akaho 11; Asts: Miyazaki 5		Pts: Surin 10; Rebs: Janthabut, Sorot 4 Asts: Saechua 3

Hsinchuang Gymnasium, New Taipei City

7 August
17:00

Report

Chinese Taipei B	84–86 (OT)	United States WJC
Scoring by quarter: 21–20, 13–19, 16–19, 23–15, Overtime: 11–13
Pts: Huang H.T. 18; Rebs: Huang H.T. 9 Asts: Huang H.T., Huang Y.T. 3		Pts: Harvin 23; Rebs: Harris 22; Asts: Ford 4

Hsinchuang Gymnasium, New Taipei City

7 August
19:00

Report

Chinese Taipei A	63–64	South Korea
Scoring by quarter: 13–24, 14–14, 20–9, 16–17
Pts: Peng S.C. 20; Rebs: Lin C.W. 7 Asts: Huang F.S., Li Y.R., Peng S.C. 3		Pts: Kim D.B. 19; Rebs: Kwak 12; Asts: Kim D.B. 7

Hsinchuang Gymnasium, New Taipei City

== Awards ==
=== Men's tournament ===
2016 William Jones Cup
(Philippines)
Mighty Sports
First title

Most Valuable Player
(United States) Dewarick Spencer (Mighty Sports)

Mythical Five

- Quincy Davis (Chinese Taipei A)
- (United States) Al Thornton (Mighty Sports)
- Liu Cheng (Chinese Taipei A)
- (United States) Dewarick Spencer (Mighty Sports)
- (South Korea) Lee Seoung-Hyun

=== Women's tournament ===
2016 William Jones Cup

South Korea
Twelfth title
