= 2015 William Jones Cup =

International basketball tournament

Tournament information
- Location: M: New Taipei; W: Taipei
- Dates: M: 29 August–6 September 2015; W: 3–7 August 2016
- Host: Taiwan
- Teams: M: 9 W: 6
- Website: 2015 William Jones Cup

Final positions
- Champions: M: Iran; W: South Korea
- 1st runners-up: M: Philippines; W: Japan B
- 2nd runners-up: M: Chinese Taipei A W: Chinese Taipei A

The 2015 William Jones Cup was the 37th staging of William Jones Cup, a top-level international basketball tournament of FIBA Asia. The tournament was held in Taiwan from 29 August until 6 September 2015. All games were played in Xinchuang Gymnasium, New Taipei City.

== Men's tournament ==
=== Team standings ===
Team	Pld	W	L	PF	PA	PD	Pts	Tie
Iran	8	7	1	613	502	+111	15	
Philippines	8	6	2	638	585	+53	14	1–0
Chinese Taipei A (Blue)	8	6	2	639	604	+35	14	0–1
(Russia) Spartak Primorye	8	5	3	639	613	+26	13	
South Korea	8	4	4	584	593	−9	12	
(New Zealand) Wellington Saints	8	3	5	688	688	0	11	1–0
(United States) USA Overtake-Select	8	3	5	652	654	−2	11	0–1
Japan	8	2	6	551	602	−51	10	
Chinese Taipei B (White)	8	0	8	548	711	−163	8	

==== Day 1 ====
August 29
13:00

Report

South Korea	46–77	Iran
Scoring by quarter: 14–12, 8–24, 16–21, 8–20
Pts: Cho Sung-min 15; Rebs: Kim Jong-kyu 8 Asts: Lee Jung-hyun 2		Pts: Jamshidi 13; Rebs: Kardoust 7 Asts: Aslani 4

Xinchuang Gymnasium, New Taipei City
Referees: Leong Chuen Wing, Chan Wai Seong, Chen Chau-Hung

August 29
15:00

Report

Chinese Taipei B	85–102	(New Zealand) Wellington Saints
Scoring by quarter: 21–21, 17–26, 21–25, 26–30
Pts: Chou Yi Hsiang 27; Rebs: Lin Wei-Han, Lu Chi-Min 6 Asts: Lin Wei-Han 7		Pts: Edwards 28; Rebs: Turner 16; Asts: Devendorf 3

Xinchuang Gymnasium, New Taipei City
Referees: Shin Gi Rok, Horiuchi Jun, Ho Ming Tat

August 29
17:00

Report

USA Overtake-Select (United States)	65–84	(Russia) Spartak Primorye
Scoring by quarter: 22–20, 4–18, 24–33, 15–13
Pts: Bradford 20; Rebs: Warner 8 Asts: Chandler 3		Pts: Ivanov 16; Rebs: Three players Asts: Savelev 8

Xinchuang Gymnasium, New Taipei City
Referees: Chung Yi-Chi, Chen Hung-Ming, Huang Ho-Yung

August 29
19:00

Report

Chinese Taipei A	84–82 (OT)	Japan
Scoring by quarter: 22–21, 16–20, 19–13, 15–18, Overtime: 12–10
Pts: Lin Chih-chieh 18; Rebs: Davis 13; Asts: Lin Chih-chieh 8		Pts: Takeuchi 17; Rebs: Tabuse, Takeuchi 9 Asts: Tanaka 5

Xinchuang Gymnasium, New Taipei City
Referees: Matthew Bathurstt, Arnolfo Bermeo, Jafar Mohammadpour

==== Day 2 ====
August 30
13:00

Report

Spartak Primorye (Russia)	86–84	South Korea
Scoring by quarter: 28–26, 18–15, 22–20, 18–23
Pts: Fedorchuk 18; Rebs: Fedorchuk 11; Asts: Savelev 7		Pts: Kim Sun-hyung 24; Rebs: Moon Tae-young 7 Asts: Kim Tae-sul 8

Xinchuang Gymnasium, New Taipei City
Referees: Han Wai Seong, Sung Ming-Lu, Chen Chun-Chih

August 30
15:00

Report

Iran	88–66	Chinese Taipei B
Scoring by quarter: 20–9, 21–11, 32–20, 15–26
Pts: Mashayekhi 20; Rebs: Arghavan 10; Asts: Aslani, Jamshidi 4		Pts: Chou Po-Hsun, Chien Wei-Ju 13; Rebs: Chou Po-Hsun 5 Asts: Chien Wei-Ju 3

Xinchuang Gymnasium, New Taipei City
Referees: Arnolfo Bermeo, Shin Gi Rok, Ho Ming Tat

August 30
17:00

Report

Japan	76–91	(United States) USA Overtake-Select
Scoring by quarter: 25–13, 12–21, 18–34, 21–23
Pts: Matsui 20; Rebs: Ota 7 Asts: Tsuji 4		Pts: Chandler 26; Rebs: Watkins 15; Asts: Bradford 9

Xinchuang Gymnasium, New Taipei City
Referees: Tsai Fu-Shan, Chen Ying-Cheng, Tien Hsiao-Lun

August 30
19:00

Report

Philippines	77–69	Chinese Taipei A
Scoring by quarter: 26–20, 21–11, 7–23, 23–15
Pts: Romeo 18; Rebs: Tautuaa 9 Asts: William 4		Pts: Chen Shih-Nien, Davis 12; Rebs: Davis 13; Asts: Chen Shih-Nien 4

Xinchuang Gymnasium, New Taipei City
Referees: Jafar Mohammadpour, Matthew Bathurstt, Horiuchi Jun

==== Day 3 ====
August 31
13:00

Report

Wellington Saints (New Zealand)	94–98	(Russia) Spartak Primorye
Scoring by quarter: 27–16, 16–24, 20–26, 31–32
Pts: Braswell 25; Rebs: B. Davis 11; Asts: Braswell 3		Pts: Glazyrin 24; Rebs: Savelev 10; Asts: Savelev 3

Xinchuang Gymnasium, New Taipei City
Referees: Chan Wai Seong, Ng Yui-Wai, Ho Chang-Jen

August 31
15:00

Report

Japan	57–78	Iran
Scoring by quarter: 13–17, 9–16, 19–22, 16–23
Pts: Takeuchi 16; Rebs: Takeuchi 9 Asts: Three players 3		Pts: Haddadi 14; Rebs: Sahakian 11; Asts: Mashayekhi 3

Xinchuang Gymnasium, New Taipei City
Referees: Wu Chien-Wu, Huang Yung-Chu, Hsien Wen-Wei

August 31
17:00

Report

South Korea	82–70	Philippines
Scoring by quarter: 20–21, 16–13, 18–20, 28–16
Pts: Lee Seung-hyun 19; Rebs: Moon Tae-young 12; Asts: Park Chan-hee, Kim Tae-sul 4		Pts: Romeo 23; Rebs: Abueva, de Ocampo 6 Asts: William 3

Xinchuang Gymnasium, New Taipei City
Referees: Matthew Bathurstt, Jafar Mohammadpour, Horiuchi Jun

August 31
19:00

Report

Chinese Taipei A	96–77	(United States) USA Overtake-Select
Scoring by quarter: 27–13, 15–21, 28–19, 26–24
Pts: Chen Shun Hsiang, Liu Cheng 14; Rebs: Wu Tai-hao 7 Asts: Chen Shih-chieh 7		Pts: Bradford 19; Rebs: Hall, Warner 14; Asts: Three players 2

Xinchuang Gymnasium, New Taipei City
Referees: Arnolfo Bermeo, Leong Chuen Wing, Shin Gi Rok

==== Day 4 ====
September 1
13:00

Report

Philippines	85–71	(Russia) Spartak Primorye
Scoring by quarter: 20–23, 23–17, 18–10, 24–21
Pts: de Ocampo 13; Rebs: Abueva 8 Asts: Tautuaa 5		Pts: Glazyrin 23; Rebs: Fediushin 8 Asts: Savelev 3

Xinchuang Gymnasium, New Taipei City
Referees: Shin Gi Rok, Leong Chuen Wing, Huang Hsien-Ming

September 1
15:00

Report

Iran	83–70	(New Zealand) Wellington Saints
Scoring by quarter: 13–15, 22–19, 23–22, 25–14
Pts: Haddadi 17; Rebs: Haddadi 10; Asts: Kamrani 3		Pts: Braswell, B. Davis 12; Rebs: B. Davis 7 Asts: Four players 1

Xinchuang Gymnasium, New Taipei City
Referees: Horiuchi Jun, Lan Wei-Hsiung, Chu Sheng-Tung

September 1
17:00

Report

USA Overtake-Select (United States)	80–94	South Korea
Scoring by quarter: 18–29, 25–19, 12–27, 25–19
Pts: Chandler 20; Rebs: Chandler, Hall 9 Asts: McDonald 4		Pts: Lee Seung-hyun; Rebs: Kim Jong-kyu 8 Asts: Kim Tae-sul 9

Xinchuang Gymnasium, New Taipei City
Referees: Arnolfo Bermeo, Matthew Bathurstt, Chang Lu-Yueh

September 1
19:00

Report

Chinese Taipei B	69–84	Chinese Taipei A
Scoring by quarter: 17–25, 21–12, 10–24, 21–23
Pts: Chou Yi-Hsiang 22; Rebs: Chou Po Hsun 12; Asts: Chou Yi-Hsiang 4		Pts: Chou Po Chen 19; Rebs: Wu Tai-hao 10; Asts: Tseng Wen Ting 6

Xinchuang Gymnasium, New Taipei City
Referees: Jafar Mohammadpour, Chan Wai Seong, Edmond Ho Ming Tat

==== Day 5 ====
September 2
13:00

Report

Iran	66–81	(United States) USA Overtake-Select
Scoring by quarter: 14–22, 16–9, 17–29, 19–21
Pts: Lalehzadeh 12; Rebs: Hassanzadeh 8 Asts: Kamrani 2		Pts: Warner 34; Rebs: Warner] 12; Asts: Warner 4

Xinchuang Gymnasium, New Taipei City
Referees: Edmond Ho Ming Tat, Shin Gi Rok, Yu Jung

September 2
15:00

Report

Japan	60–75	Philippines
Scoring by quarter: 10–11, 15–18, 19–17, 16–29
Pts: Takeuchi 15; Rebs: Takeuchi 13; Asts: Three players 2		Pts: Romeo 16; Rebs: Abueva 8 Asts: William 5

Xinchuang Gymnasium, New Taipei City
Referees: Chen Hung-Ming, Lin Chieh-Hung, Wei Sheng-Hsuan

September 2
17:00

Report

South Korea	74–70	(New Zealand) Wellington Saints
Scoring by quarter: 18–20, 15–16, 16–17, 25–17
Pts: Moon Tae-young 20; Rebs: Moon Tae-young 8 Asts: Kim Tae-sul 11		Pts: Turner 24; Rebs: Turner 14; Asts: Devendorf 2

Xinchuang Gymnasium, New Taipei City
Referees: Wu Chien-Wu, Ho Chang-Jen, Chuang Chih-Chun

September 2
19:00

Report

Spartak Primorye (Russia)	97–67	Chinese Taipei B
Scoring by quarter: 25–13, 24–16, 23–16, 25–22
Pts: Fediushin 18; Rebs: Fedorchuk 10; Asts: Savelev 10		Pts: Lu Chi-Min 23; Rebs: Chou Po-Hsun, Chien Wei-Ju 4 Asts: Lu Chi-Min 3

Xinchuang Gymnasium, New Taipei City
Referees: Arnolfo Bermeo, Chan Wai Seong, Leong Chuen Wing

==== Day 6 ====
September 3
13:00

Report

Philippines	65–74	Iran
Scoring by quarter: 14–17, 17–17, 16–20, 18–20
Pts: Taulava 12; Rebs: Taulava 8 Asts: Norwood 3		Pts: Haddadi 22; Rebs: Haddadi 15; Asts: Kamrani 4

Xinchuang Gymnasium, New Taipei City
Referees: Wu Liang-Min, Hsien Wen-Wei, Chang Lu-Yueh

September 3
15:00

Report

Wellington Saints (New Zealand)	89–81	Japan
Scoring by quarter: 16–23, 18–22, 30–17, 25–19
Pts: Turner 24; Rebs: Turner 11; Asts: Braswell 5		Pts: Takeuchi 23; Rebs: Takeuchi 13; Asts: Tsuji 4

Xinchuang Gymnasium, New Taipei City
Referees: Huang Hsien-Ming, Ng Yui-Wai, Chen Chau-Hung

September 3
17:00

Report

Chinese Taipei B	70–77	South Korea
Scoring by quarter: 22–24, 8–13, 20–26, 20–14
Pts: Lu C.J. 14; Rebs: Chou P.C. 6 Asts: Lin W.H. 5		Pts: Lee J.H. 17; Rebs: Kim J.K. 13; Asts: Park C.H., Kim T.S. 4

Xinchuang Gymnasium, New Taipei City
Referees: Leong Chuen Wing, Chan Wai Seong, Edmond Ho Ming Tat

September 3
19:00

Report

Spartak Primorye (Russia)	73–77	Chinese Taipei A
Scoring by quarter: 23–16, 9–18, 15–19, 26–24
Pts: Glazyrin 17; Rebs: Gudumak 14; Asts: Savelyev 5		Pts: Liu 25; Rebs: Davis 11; Asts: Liu 4

Xinchuang Gymnasium, New Taipei City
Referees: Arnolfo Bermeo, Jafar Mohammadpour, Matthew Bathurstt

==== Day 7 ====
September 4
13:00

Report

Philippines	92–88 (OT)	(New Zealand) Wellington Saints
Scoring by quarter: 25–25, 7–17, 20–17, 26–19, Overtime: 14–10
Pts: William 22; Rebs: Abueva 10; Asts: William 5		Pts: Davis 31; Rebs: Davis 13; Asts: Bloxham 7

Xinchuang Gymnasium, New Taipei City
Referees: Chen Caun-Chih, Chu Sheng-Tung, Huang Hsien-Ming

September 4
15:00

Report

Japan	60–54	South Korea
Scoring by quarter: 15–9, 19–12, 12–18, 14–15
Pts: Takeuchi 18; Rebs: Takeuchi 17; Asts: Tabuse 3		Pts: Lee J.H. 19; Rebs: Lee S.H. 12; Asts: Three players 2

Xinchuang Gymnasium, New Taipei City
Referees: Leong Chuen Wing, Edmond Ho Ming Tat, Lin Chieh-Hung

September 4
17:00

Report

USA Overtake-Select (United States)	95–69	Chinese Taipei B
Scoring by quarter: 20–25, 17–10, 30–14, 28–20
Pts: Warner 32; Rebs: Warner 17; Asts: Bradford 3		Pts: Lee C.W. 25; Rebs: Liu Y.K. 17; Asts: Lin W.H. 7

Xinchuang Gymnasium, New Taipei City
Referees: Jafar Mohammadpour, Shin Gi Rok, Chan Wai Seong

September 4
19:00

Report

Chinese Taipei A	63–69	Iran
Scoring by quarter: 16–15, 16–16, 19–24, 12–14
Pts: Liu 12; Rebs: Three players 6 Asts: Tseng 4		Pts: Three players 11; Rebs: Haddadi, Sahakian 12; Asts: Kamrani 4

Xinchuang Gymnasium, New Taipei City
Referees: Jun Horiuchi, Arnolfo Bermeo, Matthew Bathurstt

==== Day 8 ====
September 5
13:00

Report

Chinese Taipei B	55–72	Japan
Scoring by quarter: 13–12, 21–18, 10–20, 11–22
Pts: Chou Y.H. 19; Rebs: Chou P.H. 9 Asts: Lin W.H. 4		Pts: Mitsuhara 26; Rebs: Mitsuhara 17; Asts: Tsuji 4

Xinchuang Gymnasium, New Taipei City
Referees: Huang Yung-Chu, Sung Ming-Lu, Huang Ho-Yung

September 5
15:00

Report

Iran	78–54	(Russia) Spartak Primorye
Scoring by quarter: 18–14, 17–13, 31–17, 12–10
Pts: Kamrani 20; Rebs: Haddadi 7 Asts: Five players 2		Pts: Uzinskii 23; Rebs: Gudumak 10; Asts: Savelev, Gudumak 3

Xinchuang Gymnasium, New Taipei City
Referees: Wu Chien-Wu, Ng Yui-Wai, Chang Lu-Yueh

September 5
17:00

Report

USA Overtake-Select (United States)	74–78	Philippines
Scoring by quarter: 13–15, 17–25, 17–20, 27–18
Pts: Chandler 20; Rebs: Warner 16; Asts: Hall 2		Pts: Abueva 20; Rebs: Abueva, Tautuaa 8 Asts: Ganuelas 4

Xinchuang Gymnasium, New Taipei City
Referees: Wu Liang-Min, Chan Wai Seong, Hsien Wen-Wei

September 5
19:00

Report

Wellington Saints (New Zealand)	84–86	Chinese Taipei A
Scoring by quarter: 22–16, 20–16, 17–18, 25–36
Pts: Braswell 22; Rebs: Davis 11; Asts: Devendorf 4		Pts: Davis 22; Rebs: Davis 9 Asts: Hung 4

Xinchuang Gymnasium, New Taipei City
Referees: Arnolfo Bermeo, Jafar Mohammadpour, Horiuchi Jun

==== Day 9 ====
September 6
13:00

Report

Philippines	96–67	Chinese Taipei B
Scoring by quarter: 24–21, 26–11, 32–21, 14–14
Pts: David 22; Rebs: Ramos 10; Asts: William 4		Pts: Chien 18; Rebs: Chen 8 Asts: Lin 6

Xinchuang Gymnasium, New Taipei City
Referees: Horiuchi Jun, Shin Gi Rok, Ho Ming Tat

September 6
15:00

Report

Japan	63–76	(Russia) Spartak Primorye
Scoring by quarter: 16–18, 21–15, 15–19, 11–24
Pts: Furukawa 18; Rebs: Furukawa 6 Asts: Hashimoto 5		Pts: Ivanov 19; Rebs: Gudumak 12; Asts: Savelev 5

Xinchuang Gymnasium, New Taipei City
Referees: Tsai Fu-Shan, Leong Chuen Wing, Sung Ming-Lu

September 6
17:00

Report

Wellington Saints (New Zealand)	91–89 (OT)	(United States) USA Overtake-Select
Scoring by quarter: 21–23, 21–18, 19–23, 20–17, Overtime: 10–8
Pts: Roscoe 24; Rebs: Turner 15; Asts: Roscoe 5		Pts: Bradford 23; Rebs: Warner 29; Asts: Bradford 4

Xinchuang Gymnasium, New Taipei City
Referees: Chung Yi-Chi, Chen Hung-Ming, Chen Chau-Hung

September 6
19:00

Report

Chinese Taipei A	80–73	South Korea
Scoring by quarter: 23–24, 18–21, 19–18, 20–10
Pts: Davis 13; Rebs: Davis 15; Asts: Tseng 4		Pts: Lee J.H. 31; Rebs: Ha S.J. 6 Asts: Kim T.S. 5

Xinchuang Gymnasium, New Taipei City
Referees: Jafar Mohammadpour, Arnolfo Bermeo, Matthew Bathurst

== Women's tournament ==
=== Team standings ===
Team	Pld	W	L	PF	PA	PD	Pts
South Korea	5	5	0	396	276	+120	10
Japan B	5	4	1	373	350	+23	9
Chinese Taipei A (Blue)	5	3	2	352	320	+32	8
New Zealand	5	1	4	317	354	−37	6
United States WJC	5	1	4	355	398	−43	6
Chinese Taipei B (White)	5	1	4	307	402	−95	6

==== Day 1 ====
July 27
15:00

Report

Japan	60–82	South Korea

Taipei Gymnasium, Taipei

July 27
17:00

Report

New Zealand	66–77	Chinese Taipei B

Taipei Gymnasium, Taipei

July 27
19:30

Report

Chinese Taipei A	93–62	United States WJC

Taipei Gymnasium, Taipei

==== Day 2 ====
July 28
15:00

Report

Japan	78–66	New Zealand

Taipei Gymnasium, Taipei

July 28
17:00

Report

United States WJC	59–78	South Korea

Taipei Gymnasium, Taipei

July 28
19:00

Report

Chinese Taipei B	71–78	Chinese Taipei A

Taipei Gymnasium, Taipei

==== Day 3 ====
July 29
15:00

Report

South Korea	75–56	New Zealand

Taipei Gymnasium, Taipei

July 29
17:00

Report

Chinese Taipei B	53–94	United States WJC

Taipei Gymnasium, Taipei

July 29
19:00

Report

Chinese Taipei A	59–69	Japan

Taipei Gymnasium, Taipei

==== Day 4 ====
July 30
15:00

Report

South Korea	93–49	Chinese Taipei B

Taipei Gymnasium, Taipei

July 30
17:00

Report

Japan	95–86	United States WJC

Taipei Gymnasium, Taipei

July 30
19:00

Report

New Zealand	50–70	Chinese Taipei A

Taipei Gymnasium, Taipei

==== Day 5 ====
July 31
15:00

Report

United States WJC	54–79	New Zealand

Taipei Gymnasium, Taipei

July 31
17:00

Report

Chinese Taipei B	57–71	Japan

Taipei Gymnasium, Taipei

July 31
19:00

Report

Chinese Taipei A	52–68	South Korea

Taipei Gymnasium, Taipei

== Awards ==
=== Men's tournament ===
2015 William Jones Cup Men's Tournament

Iran
Fifth title

Most Valuable Player
(Iran) Hamed Haddadi

Mythical Five

- (Iran) Hamed Haddadi
- (Iran) Mehdi Kamrani
- (South Korea) Moon Tae-young
- (Philippines) Jayson Castro
- (Chinese Taipei) Lin Chih-chieh

=== Women's tournament ===
2015 William Jones Cup Women's Tournament

South Korea
Eleventh title
