= Tim Fuller =

American basketball coach

Current position
- Title: General Manager
- Team: Missouri
- Conference: SEC

Biographical details
- Born: February 7, 1978 (age 48); Harrisburg, Pennsylvania

Playing career
- 1996–2000: Wake Forest

Coaching career (HC unless noted)
- 2000–2001: North Carolina A&T (asst.)
- 2001–2002: West Forsyth HS (asst.)
- 2002–2004: Elon (asst.)
- 2004–2006: Wake Forest (asst.)
- 2006–2007: Fairfield (asst.)
- 2010–2011: Louisville (asst.)
- 2011–2015: Missouri (assoc.)
- 2023–2025: Providence (asst.)

Administrative career (AD unless noted)
- 2015–2020: Harris–Stowe State (president's advisor)
- 2025–present: Missouri (GM)

Head coaching record
- Overall: 5–0

Timothy Floyd Fuller (born February 7, 1978) is the General Manager of the Missouri Tigers men's basketball team. He is a former Vice President of Recruiting and Player Personnel at Overtime Elite and associate head basketball coach at Missouri. He has worked as an assistant coach under Ernie Nestor, Skip Prosser, Ed Cooley, Rick Pitino, Frank Haith, Kim Anderson and Kim English.

== Education ==
Fuller attended Woodbridge Senior High School. He graduated in 2000 with a bachelor's degree in communications from Wake Forest University, where he played on the men's basketball team.

== Career ==
In 2010, while working at a basketball camp in China, Fuller was offered and accepted an assistant coach position for the University of Louisville men's college basketball.

In April 2012, Fuller was named associate coach of the University of Missouri men's basketball program.

He was named one of college basketball's Top 10 assistant coaches under the age of 40 by ESPN.com in May 2012.

He also worked as a Nike pro sports representative.

With Missouri Basketball coach Frank Haith suspended for the start of the 2013–14 basketball season Missouri's associate head coach Tim Fuller got a chance to be the head coach for the first five games. In his first game filling in he coached the Tigers to an 89–53 victory over Southeastern Louisiana starting the season 1–0. He would go on to coach the team to four more victories defeating Southern Illinois (72–59), Hawai'i (92–80), Gardner-Webb (72–63), and IUPUI (78–64) finishing the five games of Haith's suspension 5–0.

In May 2015, Harris-Stowe State University in St. Louis hired Fuller as an advisor on athletic matters to the university president.

== Head coaching record ==
Record table
Season	Team	Overall	Conference	Standing	Postseason
Missouri Tigers (Southeastern Conference) (2013–2013)
2013–14*	Missouri	5–0	0–0		
Missouri:		5–0 (1.000)	0–0 (–)		
Total:		5–0 (1.000)			
National champion Postseason invitational champion Conference regular season champion Conference regular season and conference tournament champion Division regular season champion Division regular season and conference tournament champion Conference tournament champion

(*) Interim Head coach
