= Hamady N'Diaye =

Senegalese basketball player (born 1987)

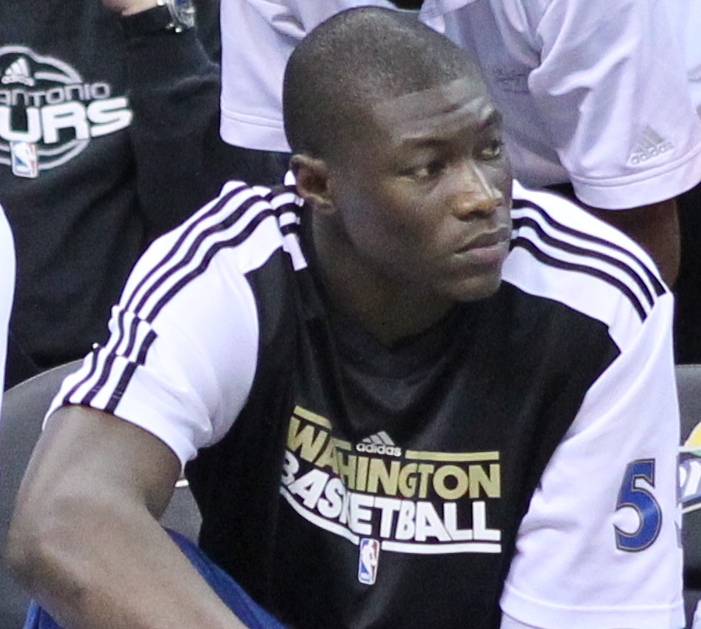
- N'Diaye in 2011 with the Washington Wizards

No. 55 – Hyères-Toulon
- Position: Center
- League: LNB Pro B

Personal information
- Born: January 12, 1987 (age 39) Dakar, Senegal
- Listed height: 7 ft 0 in (2.13 m)
- Listed weight: 235 lb (107 kg)

Career information
- High school: Stoneridge Preparatory School (Simi Valley, California)
- College: Rutgers (2006–2010)
- NBA draft: 2010: 2nd round, 56th overall pick
- Drafted by: Minnesota Timberwolves
- Playing career: 2010–present

Career history
- 2010–2012: Washington Wizards
- 2011: →Dakota Wizards
- 2012: →Iowa Energy
- 2012: Maine Red Claws
- 2012: Guangzhou Liu Sui Whampoa
- 2012–2013: Tianjin RongGang
- 2013–2014: Sacramento Kings
- 2013–2014: →Reno Bighorns
- 2014: Delaware 87ers
- 2014: Guangxi Rhinos
- 2014–2015: Byblos
- 2015: Kia Carnival
- 2015–2016: Bnei Herzliya
- 2016–2017: Unicaja
- 2017: Bnei Herzliya
- 2017–2019: Sidigas Avellino
- 2019–2020: BCM Gravelines-Dunkerque
- 2020–2022: Élan Béarnais
- 2022–2024: Nanterre 92
- 2024–present: Hyères-Toulon

Career highlights
- French Cup winner (2022); CBA Best Defender (2013); CBA blocks leader (2013); Big East Defensive Player of the Year (2010)
- Stats at NBA.com
- Stats at Basketball Reference
Medals
Men's basketball
Representing Senegal
AfroBasket
Bronze medal – third place	2013 Abidjan
Bronze medal – third place	2017 Tunisia/Senegal

Hamady Barro N'Diaye (pronounced HAH-muh-dee EN-jigh; born January 12, 1987) is a Senegalese professional basketball player for Hyères-Toulon of the LNB Pro B. A 7-foot tall center, N'Diaye played college basketball for Rutgers University and was a second-round selection in the 2010 NBA draft.

== Early life ==
N'Diaye grew up in Senegal and came to the United States to attend high school at Stoneridge Preparatory School in Simi Valley, California. He played soccer in childhood and began playing basketball as a high school student.

== College career ==
During his senior year at Rutgers University, N'Diaye had 145 blocks and averaged 4.5 blocks per game (the third highest in the nation). On March 9, 2010, during a 69–68 loss to Cincinnati in the Big East Tournament, N'Diaye ended the season with the 358 blocked shots in his career. He broke school records held by former NBA player Roy Hinson. N'Diaye was awarded the Big East Defensive Player of the Year.

== Professional career ==
On June 24, 2010, N'Diaye was drafted by the Minnesota Timberwolves with the 56th overall pick in the 2010 NBA draft. His draft rights were then traded to the Washington Wizards. On January 6, 2011, N'Diaye was assigned to the Dakota Wizards of the NBA D-League. He was recalled on February 4. On December 10, N'Diaye re-signed with the Wizards. On January 1, 2012, N'Diaye was assigned to the Iowa Energy. On January 30, he was recalled. On February 7, he was waived by the Wizards. On February 27, N'Diaye was acquired by the Maine Red Claws of the NBA D-League. In April 2012, he joined Guangzhou Liu Sui Whampoa of China.

In July 2012, N'Diaye joined the Indiana Pacers for the Orlando Summer League and the Charlotte Bobcats for the Las Vegas Summer League. On September 25, 2012, he signed with the Sacramento Kings. However, he was waived on October 26. In November 2012, he joined Tianjin RongGang of China for the 2012–13 season.

He joined the Dallas Mavericks for the 2013 NBA Summer League. On August 29, 2013, N'Diaye's rights were acquired by the Delaware 87ers in the 2013 NBA Development League Expansion Draft. In September 2013, he signed with the Sacramento Kings. On December 6, 2013, the Kings assigned N'Diaye to the Reno Bighorns of the NBA D-League. He was recalled the next day. On January 3, 2014, he was reassigned to the Bighorns. He was recalled the next day. On January 6, 2014, he was waived by the Kings.

On January 25, 2014, N'Diaye was acquired by the Delaware 87ers. On March 10, 2014, he was waived by the 87ers due to a season-ending injury. In May 2014, he joined Guangxi Rhinos of China.

On September 17, 2014, N'Diaye signed with the Brooklyn Nets. However, two days later, his contract was voided by the Nets after he failed the required physical. In November 2014, he signed with Byblos of the Lebanese Basketball League. On April 29, 2015, he signed with Kia Carnival of the Philippine Basketball Association.

On August 18, 2015, N'Diaye signed with Bnei Herzliya of the Israeli Basketball Premier League.

In July 2016, N'Diaye signed with the Philippines-based basketball club, Mighty Sports PH at the 38th William Jones Cup and later on winning the gold medal for the club with an unbeaten record of 8–0.

On September 23, 2016, N'Diaye signed a one-year deal with the Spanish club Unicaja Málaga. On January 31, 2017, he parted ways with Unicaja. Two days later, he returned to his former club Bnei Herzliya.

On August 18, 2017, N'Diaye signed with the Italian team Sidigas Avellino for the 2017–18 season. After averaging 5.4 points and 3.7 rebounds per game, he re-signed with the team on August 9, 2018.

On July 31, 2019, N'Diaye signed with BCM Gravelines-Dunkerque of the LNB Pro A. N'Diaye averaged 6.2 points and 3.9 rebounds per game.

On August 19, 2020, N'Diaye signed with Boulazac Basket Dordogne. Without playing any competitive game with BBD, he has signed with Élan Béarnais of the French LNB Pro A on October 19, 2020.

On June 21, 2022, N'Diaye signed with Nanterre 92 of the LNB Pro A.

On October 25, 2024, N'Diaye signed with Hyères-Toulon of the LNB Pro B.

== Personal ==
N'Diaye is a member of the Iota Phi Theta fraternity.

== Career statistics ==
Legend
GP	Games played	GS	Games started	MPG	Minutes per game
FG%	Field goal percentage	3P%	3-point field goal percentage	FT%	Free throw percentage
RPG	Rebounds per game	APG	Assists per game	SPG	Steals per game
BPG	Blocks per game	PPG	Points per game	**Bold**	Career high

=== NBA ===
==== Regular season ====
Year	Team	GP	GS	MPG	FG%	3P%	FT%	RPG	APG	SPG	BPG	PPG
2010–11	Washington	**16**	0	5.0	**.800**	–	**.500**	.4	.0	**.1**	**.3**	**.9**
2011–12	Washington	3	0	1.0	.000	–	–	.0	.0	.0	.0	.0
2013–14	Sacramento	14	0	**5.3**	.333	–	.000	**1.3**	**.2**	.0	**.3**	.4
Career		33	0	4.8	.467	–	.462	.8	.1	.1	.3	.6
