= Bryan Davis (basketball) =

American basketball player

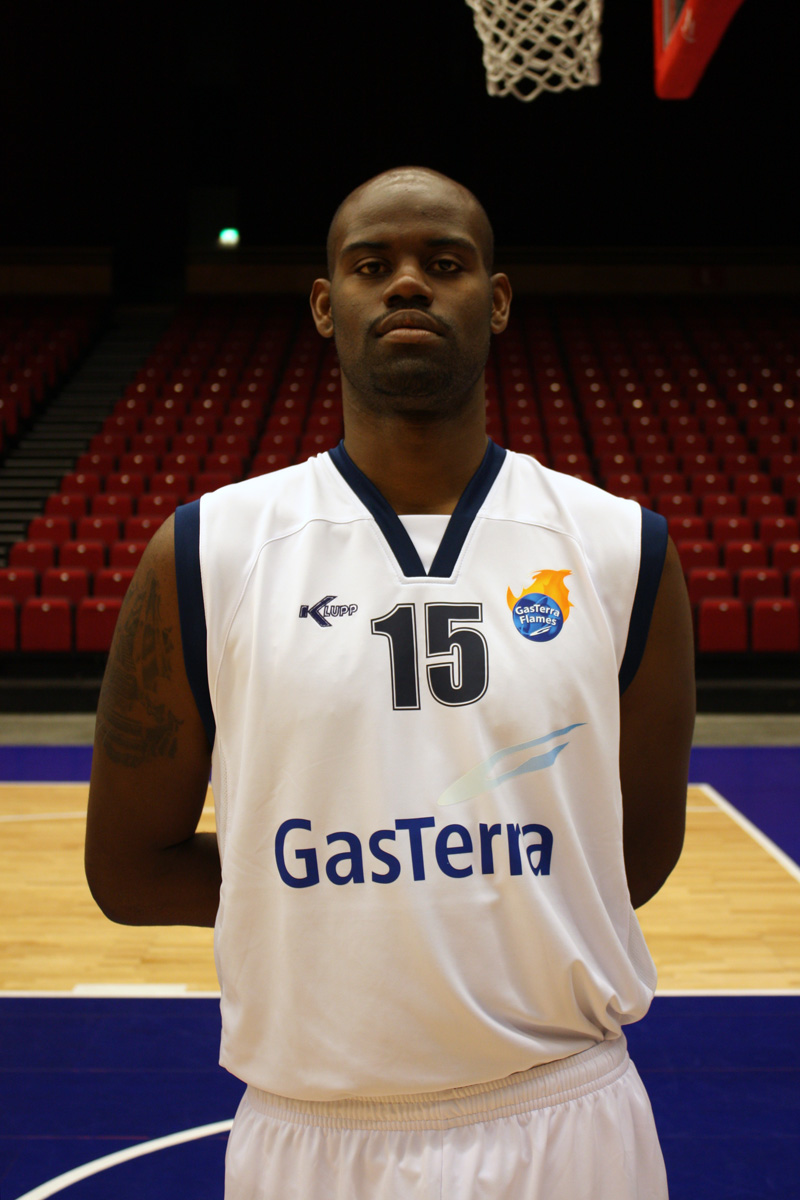
- Davis with GasTerra Flames in 2011

Personal information
- Born: December 31, 1986 (age 39) Dallas, Texas, U.S.
- Listed height: 6 ft 9 in (2.06 m)
- Listed weight: 250 lb (113 kg)

Career information
- High school: Grand Prairie (Grand Prairie, Texas)
- College: Texas A&M (2006–2010)
- NBA draft: 2010: undrafted
- Playing career: 2010–2019
- Position: Power forward / center

Career history
- 2010–2011: Czarni Słupsk
- 2011–2012: Kryvbasbasket
- 2012: Hebei Springs Benma
- 2012: Seoul Samsung Thunders
- 2012: Sonic Boom KT
- 2013: Czarni Słupsk
- 2013: Jiang Xi
- 2013–2014: Reno Bighorns
- 2014: Wellington Saints
- 2014–2015: Kinmen Kaoliang Liquor
- 2015: Capitanes de Arecibo
- 2015: Czarni Słupsk
- 2015–2016: Dacin Tigers
- 2016: Wellington Saints
- 2016: Spirou Charleroi
- 2016–2017: Taiwan Beer
- 2017–2018: Club Trouville
- 2018: Westports Malaysia Dragons
- 2018: Belfius Mons-Hainaut
- 2018–2019: Ángeles de Puebla
- 2019: Yulon Luxgen Dinos
- 2019: Aguada
- 2019: Halcones de Ciudad Obregón

Career highlights
- 2× NZNBL champion (2014, 2016); 2× SBL All-Star (2015, 2016); SBL All-Star MVP (2015); SBL Slam Dunk Contest champion (2015); SBL scoring champion (2015); SBL assists leader(2017); 2× SBL steals leader(2015, 2017); Ukrainian Superleague All-Star (2012); PLK All-Star (2011); Third-team All-Big 12 (2010); Big 12 All-Defensive Team (2010)

Bryan Keith Davis (born December 31, 1986) is an American former professional basketball player. He played college basketball for Texas A&M University.

== Professional career ==
After going undrafted in the 2010 NBA draft, Davis played in Poland for Czarni Słupsk during the 2010–11 season. For the 2011–12 season, he played in Ukraine for Kryvbasbasket. Following his time with Kryvbasbasket, he played in China for Hebei Springs during the 2012 NBL season.

Over the first half of the 2012–13 season, Davis spent time playing in South Korea for the Seoul Samsung Thunders and the Sonic Boom KT. In April 2013, he returned to Poland and re-joined Czarni Słupsk for the rest of the 2012–13 season. He later played for Jiang Xi during the 2013 NBL season.

In November 2013, Davis was acquired by the Reno Bighorns of the NBA Development League. In 52 games for Reno during the 2013–14 season, he averaged 9.5 points, 6.2 rebounds and 1.1 assists per game.

On May 30, 2014, Davis signed with the Wellington Saints for the rest of the 2014 New Zealand NBL season. He went on to help the Saints win the championship, and in eight games, he averaged 9.8 points, 8.8 rebounds, 1.8 assists and 1.5 steals per game.

In November 2014, Davis joined Taiwanese club Kinmen Kaoliang Liquor, and during the 2014–15 SBL season, he was named a participant in the 2015 SBL All-Star Game. In 32 games, he averaged 28.3 points, 14.5 rebounds, 2.4 assists, 2.4 steals and 1.2 blocks per game.

In March 2015, Davis signed with Capitanes de Arecibo for the 2015 BSN season. In 33 games for the club, he averaged 6.7 points, 4.6 rebounds and 1.4 steals per game.

On August 24, 2015, Davis joined the Wellington Saints Invitational team for a three-day mini camp before travelling to Taiwan to play in the 2015 William Jones Cup. In the Saints' first game of the tournament against Chinese Taipei B on August 29, Davis scored a game-high 28 points in a 102–85 win.

In November 2015, Davis joined Czarni Słupsk for a third stint, but left after just three games. He returned to Taiwan in December and joined the Dacin Tigers. He again earned All-Star honors, and in 31 games, he averaged 20.1 points, 12.1 rebounds, 2.1 assists, 2.2 steals and 1.4 blocks per game.

On May 9, 2016, Davis arrived in Wellington in order to join the Saints for the rest of the 2016 New Zealand NBL season.

In September 2016, Davis re-signed with Czarni Słupsk for a fourth stint. However, left before the start of the 2016–17 season, and on October 13, 2016, he signed a three-month contract with Belgian club Spirou Charleroi. On November 23, 2016, he left Spirou in order to sign with Taiwan Beer for the rest of the season.

== Personal ==
Davis is a Christian. In the summer of 2009, he traveled to New Zealand with Athletes in Action, a Christian organization with a goal to build spiritual movements through sport. While there, they played an exhibition game against a New Zealand Breakers team that included Davis' future Wellington Saints teammate Corey Webster.
