= Kengo Nomoto =

Japanese basketball player (born 1992)

Kengo Nomoto 野本建吾
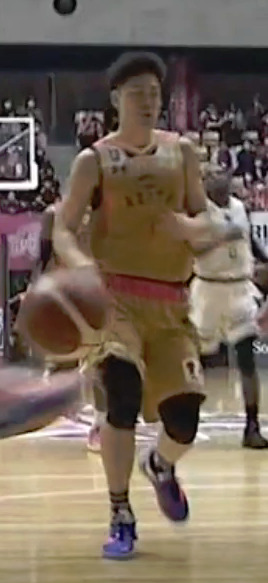

No. 11 – Gunma Crane Thunders
- Position: Small forward
- League: B.League

Personal information
- Born: April 25, 1992 (age 34) Amagasaki, Hyogo, Japan
- Listed height: 6 ft 6.8 in (2.00 m)
- Listed weight: 218 lb (99 kg)

Career information
- High school: Hokuriku (Fukui, Fukui)
- College: Aoyama Gakuin University
- Playing career: 2015–present

Career history
- 2015–2018: Kawasaki Brave Thunders
- 2018–2021: Akita Northern Happinets
- 2021-present: Gunma Crane Thunders

Career highlights
- NBL champion (2016); Japanese College champion; Japanese High School champion

Kengo Nomoto (野本 建吾, Nomoto Kengo; born April 25, 1992), nicknamed Nomoken, is a Japanese professional basketball player who plays for the Gunma Crane Thunders of the B.League in Japan. The small forward also represented the Japan national basketball team in 2014 and 2016.

== FIBA Events Stats ==
Year	Team	GP	GS	MPG	FG%	3P%	FT%	RPG	APG	SPG	BPG	PPG
2009-10	Japan U18	6		33.30	.313	.385	.588	3.3	1.2	1.2	0.7	11.2

== Non-FIBA Events Stats ==
Year	Team	GP	GS	MPG	FG%	3P%	FT%	RPG	APG	SPG	BPG	PPG
2013	Universiade	8		20.20	.447	.500	.650	2.9	1.1	0.6	0.0	7.4
2015	Universiade	8		19.28	.367	.091	.684	3.0	1.0	0.6	0.4	6.2

== Career statistics ==
Legend
GP	Games played	GS	Games started	MPG	Minutes per game
FG%	Field goal percentage	3P%	3-point field goal percentage	FT%	Free throw percentage
RPG	Rebounds per game	APG	Assists per game	SPG	Steals per game
BPG	Blocks per game	PPG	Points per game	**Bold**	Career high

†	Denotes seasons in which Nomoto won an championship

=== Regular season ===
Year	Team	GP	GS	MPG	FG%	3P%	FT%	RPG	APG	SPG	BPG	PPG
2014-15	Toshiba	7	0	7.9	21.1	25.0	75.0	1.3	0.1	0.4	**1.0**	2.3
2015-16†	Toshiba	39	8	10.1	38.5	14.3	**76.2**	1.2	0.5	0.4	**1.0**	2.4
2016-17	Kawasaki	54		9.5	**52.8**	0.0	58.5	1.6	0.5	0.2	0.1	3.0
2017-18	Kawasaki	56		8.0	37.0	0.0	55.3	1.2	0.8	0.2	0.1	1.8
2018-19	Akita	**60**	8	10.5	45.5	0.0	56.1	1.9	0.6	0.4	0.1	2.8
2019-20	Akita	41	**9**	13.2	40.1	14.3	65.2	2.0	1.1	**0.7**	0.1	3.4
2020-21	Akita	58	4	**14.6**	.446	**.263**	.606	**2.8**	**1.2**	0.4	0.1	**3.5**

=== Playoffs ===
Year	Team	GP	GS	MPG	FG%	3P%	FT%	RPG	APG	SPG	BPG	PPG
2014-15	Toshiba	2		9.0	.333	.500	.000	0.5	0.0	0.0	0.0	3.0
2015-16	Toshiba	3		3.3	.000	.000	.500	0.0	0.0	0.0	0.0	0.3
2016-17	Kawasaki	5	0	7:34	.500	.000	.000	1.4	0.2	0	0	2.8
2017-18	Kawasaki	2	0	1:17	.000	.000	.000	0.5	0	0	0	0

=== Early cup games ===
Year	Team	GP	GS	MPG	FG%	3P%	FT%	RPG	APG	SPG	BPG	PPG
2017	Kawasaki	2	2	28:00	.563	.000	.500	5.5	2.5	1.0	0.5	9.5
2018	Akita	2	0	24:40	.231	.000	.750	3.5	2.0	1.0	0.0	4.5
2019	Akita	2	0	25:04	.375	.000	.000	1.0	4.0	2.0	0.0	6.0

=== Preseason games ===
Year	Team	GP	GS	MPG	FG%	3P%	FT%	RPG	APG	SPG	BPG	PPG
2018	Akita	2	0	9.3	.000	.000	.500	2.5	1.0	0.5	0.0	0.5
2019	Akita	3	1	15.1	.500	.000	.833	2.3	1.7	1.7	0.0	5.67

Source: Changwon1Changwon2 Source: UtsunomiyaToyamaSendai

== William Jones Cup ==
Year	Team	GP	GS	MPG	FG%	3P%	FT%	RPG	APG	SPG	BPG	PPG
2014	Japan	5		5	.222	.000	.600	0.8	0.2	0.4	0.0	1.4
2016	Japan	7		14	.300	1.000	.750	2.7	0.4	0.0	0.0	2.3
2017	Japan	7		20	.450	.000	.680	4.6	1.0	0.3	0.3	7.6
Career		19		14	.377	.250	.677	2.9	0.6	0.2	0.1	4.0

== Trivia ==
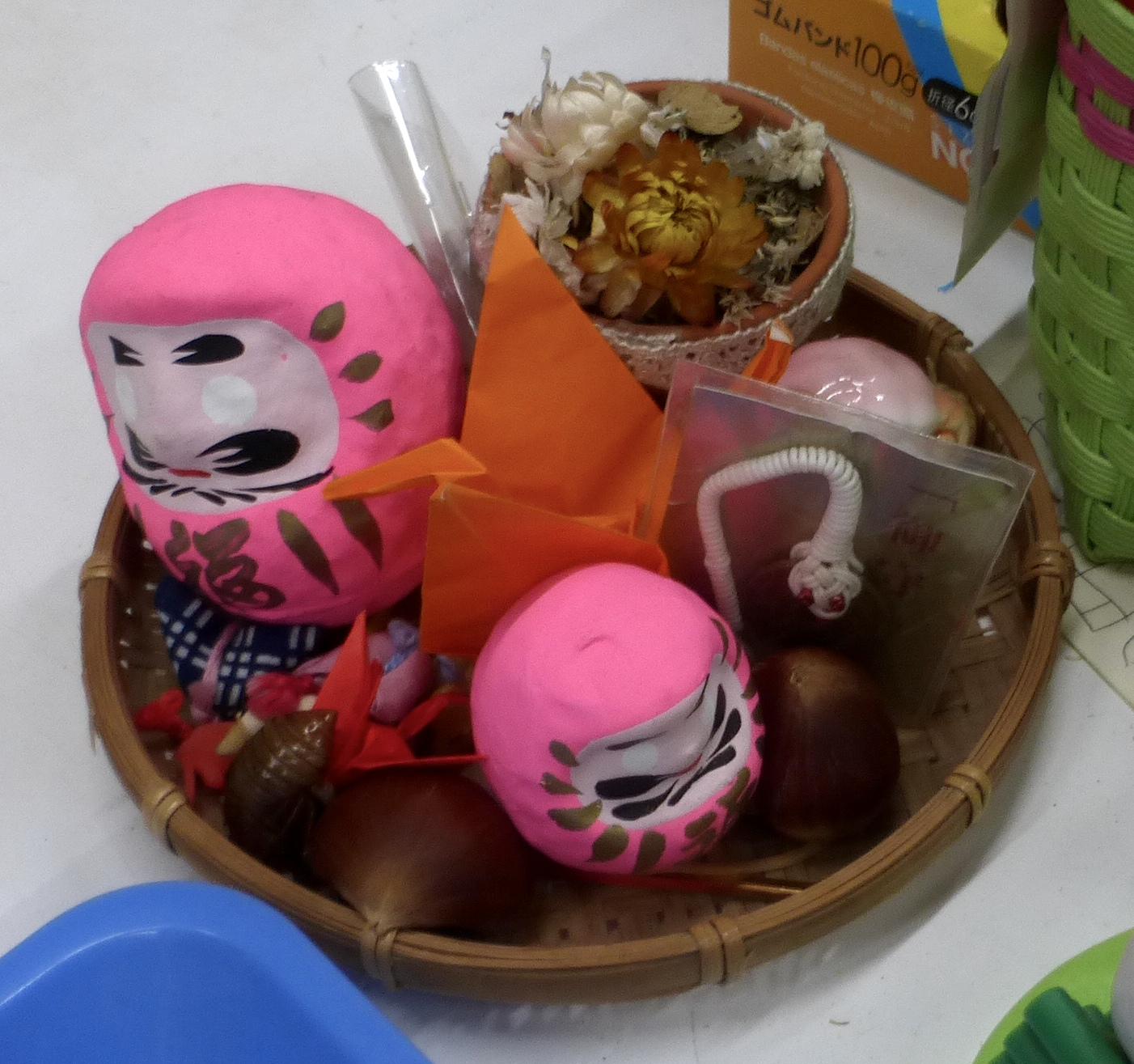
Pink daruma dolls

- His favorite quote is "Nanakorobi Yaoki", meaning "seven times down, eight times up like a daruma doll".
- He ate 1,300 grams of rice a day at Kawasaki.

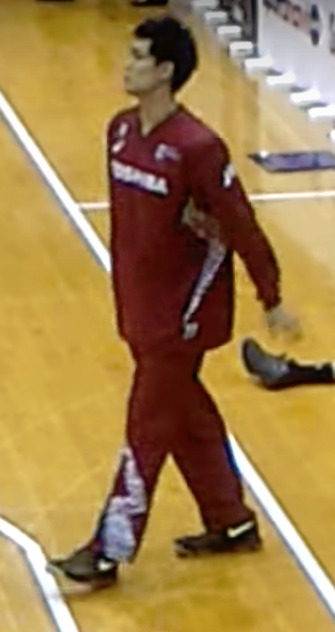
Nomoto with Kawasaki
