= Avi Schafer =

Japanese basketball player

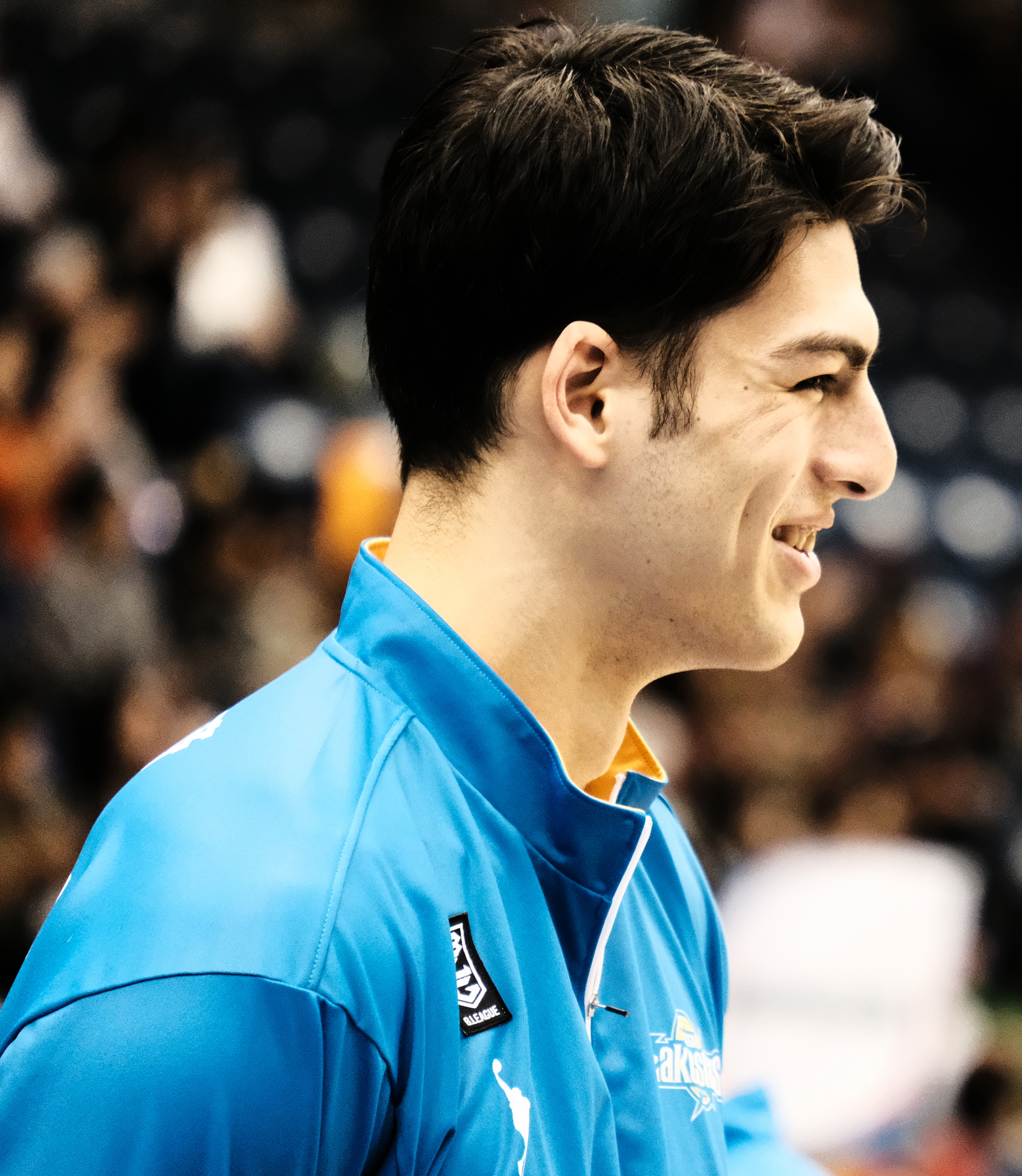
- Schafer with the Shiga Lakestars in 2019

No. 32 – Sendai 89ers
- Position: Power forward / center
- League: B.League

Personal information
- Born: 28 January 1998 (age 28) Suita, Osaka, Japan
- Listed height: 206 cm (6 ft 9 in)
- Listed weight: 106 kg (234 lb)

Career information
- High school: Kobe University Secondary School (Higashinada, Kobe); St. Mary's International School (Tokyo, Japan); Brewster Academy (Wolfeboro, New Hampshire)
- College: Georgia Tech (2017–2018)
- Playing career: 2018–present

Career history
- 2018–2019: Alvark Tokyo
- 2019–2020: Shiga Lakestars
- 2020–present: SeaHorses Mikawa

Career highlights
- B.League champion (2019)
Medals
Men's basketball
Representing Japan
Asian Games
Silver medal – second place	2026 Aichi–Nagoya	Team
William Jones Cup
Bronze medal – third place	2019 Taiwan	Team
FIBA Asia Under-18 Championship
Silver medal – second place	2016 Tehran	Team

Avi Koki Schafer (シェーファーアヴィ幸樹, Shēfā Avi Kōki; born 28 January 1998) is a Japanese professional basketball player for Sendai 89ers of the B.League. He played college basketball for the Georgia Tech Yellow Jackets. Schafer has been a member of the Japan national basketball team.

== Early life ==
Schafer was born in Suita, Osaka Prefecture, to a Japanese mother, Sayuki, and an American father, Douglas. He initially played soccer before switching to basketball in tenth grade, at the age of 16.

== High school career ==
Schafer attended Kobe University Secondary School in Higashinada and St. Mary's International School in Tokyo. He played club basketball with Tokyo Samurai, a recognized American Amateur Athletic Union based in Japan. Schafer, who initially played the sport for fun, cited that playing with the club opened the door to many basketball opportunities such as joining the national team, playing in NCAA Division I and pursuing a professional career.

After moving to the United States, Schafer attended prep school Brewster Academy in Wolfeboro, New Hampshire and played varsity basketball for the Bobcats during his senior year. He helped the team finish the season with a 33–0 record and win the national prep school championship and the NEPSAC class AAA title.

== College career ==
Schafer attended Georgia Tech and played for the Yellow Jackets. He made his collegiate debut on 22 November 2017, against the UTRGV Vaqueros. As a freshman, Schafer totaled two rebounds and three minutes over four games. As a sophomore, he appeared in two games, garnering a total of two rebounds and three minutes, before leaving Georgia Tech in the fall of 2018 to play professional basketball in Japan.

== Professional career ==
=== Alvark Tokyo (2018–2019) ===
On 19 December 2018, Schafer signed with Alvark Tokyo of the B.League, joining the team in the middle of the season. He made his professional debut on 22 December, against the Yokohama B-Corsairs, scoring two points and grabbing one rebound across three minutes of action. Tokyo went on to win the 2019 B.League championship title after defeating the Chiba Jets Funabashi. For the season, Schafer averaged 1.2 points, 0.7 rebounds and 0.1 assists in 3.6 minutes over 14 games.

On 24 May 2019, Tokyo extended Schafer's contract for another season.

=== Shiga Lakestars (2019–2020) ===
On 29 July 2019, Shiga Lakestars announced they have acquired Schafer from Alvark Tokyo via loan transfer. On 2 December, Schafer earned his first B.League All-Star selection. He was also named as one of the participants in the dunk contest. On 14 March 2020, he logged his first career double-double with 16 points and 14 rebounds, both season-highs, in a loss against his former team. Schafer appeared in 41 games, including 9 starts, averaging 4.1 points, 4.5 rebounds and 0.8 assists in 15.2 minutes per game while shooting 49.7 percent from the field. Following his performance, he was named to the B.League Best Five Rookies.

=== SeaHorses Mikawa (2020–2026) ===
On 27 May 2020, Schafer signed a one-year deal with SeaHorses Mikawa. On 14 December, he was named to the B.League All-Star list, making it his second consecutive appearance. On 24 April 2021, Schafer logged a season-high 24 points in a 106–102 overtime loss to Shimane Susanoo Magic. On 9 May, he logged a double-double with 19 points and a season-high 19 rebounds in a win over Osaka Evessa. Schafer started and played in all 55 games, averaging 9.5 points, 4.7 rebounds and 1.3 assists per game while shooting 51.1 percent from the field and 35.9 percent from three.

On 14 June 2021, Mikawa extended Schafer's contract for another season.

=== Sendai 89ers (2026–present) ===
On 2 June 2026, it was announced that Schafer had signed a contract with the Sendai 89ers for the 2026–27 season.

== National team career ==
=== Junior national team ===
Schafer made his international debut when he was selected to be a part of the Japanese squad that competed at the 2016 FIBA Asia Under-18 Championship, where he helped the team win the silver medal. In a game against Indonesia, Schafer logged a double-double with 12 points and 11 rebounds. He averaged 4.9 points, 4.5 rebounds and 0.8 assists per game.

The following year, Schafer suited up for Japan at the 2017 FIBA Under-19 Basketball World Cup, where he averaged 5.0 points, 4.9 rebounds and 0.1 assists per game and was the team's second-leading rebounder. Schafer posted a double-double twice, 11 points and 10 rebounds against Mali and 10 points and 10 rebounds versus Korea.

=== Senior national team ===
Schafer debuted for the senior national team at the 2018 William Jones Cup.

A year later, Schafer competed for the Japanese squad at the 2019 William Jones Cup, where he helped the team win the bronze medal. He had 14 points and 8 rebounds in a game against Korea. Schafer averaged 7.1 points, 4.0 rebounds and 0.6 assists per game. The following month, he represented Japan at the 2019 FIBA Basketball World Cup, where he only played in two games.

Schafer played for Japan at the 2021 FIBA Asia Cup Qualifiers, where he averaged 6.5 points, 3.5 rebounds and 0.8 assists per game. His tournament highlights included a double-double outing with 11 points and 10 rebounds against Chinese Taipei.

== Personal life ==
Schafer has two brothers. His older brother, Yuki, played soccer at Chapman University.

Schafer's father is Jewish.

== Career statistics ==
Legend
GP	Games played	GS	Games started	MPG	Minutes per game
FG%	Field goal percentage	3P%	3-point field goal percentage	FT%	Free throw percentage
RPG	Rebounds per game	APG	Assists per game	SPG	Steals per game
BPG	Blocks per game	PPG	Points per game	**Bold**	Career high

=== College ===
Year	Team	GP	GS	MPG	FG%	3P%	FT%	RPG	APG	SPG	BPG	PPG
2017–18	Georgia Tech	**4**	0	.8	.000	–	–	.5	.0	.0	.0	.0
2018–19	Georgia Tech	2	0	**1.5**	–	–	–	**1.0**	.0	.0	.0	.0
Career		6	0	1.0	.000	–	–	.7	.0	.0	.0	.0

== See also ==
- List of select Jewish basketball players
