= Keanau Post =

Canadian basketball player

Free agent
- Position: Power forward / center

Personal information
- Born: September 4, 1992 (age 33) Victoria, British Columbia, Canada
- Listed height: 6 ft 11 in (2.11 m)
- Listed weight: 270 lb (122 kg)

Career information
- High school: Oak Bay (Oak Bay, British Columbia); Westwind Prep (Phoenix, Arizona)
- College: Southwestern Illinois (2011–2013); Missouri (2013–2015)
- NBA draft: 2015: undrafted
- Playing career: 2015–present

Career history
- 2015–2016: Raptors 905
- 2016-2017: Al Nasr
- 2017–2018: Beirut Club
- 2018–2019: Hekmeh BC
- 2019–2020: Polpharma Starogard Gdański
- 2020: Qatar Club
- 2020–2021: Al Hala
- 2021: REG
- 2022: Taiwan Beer
- 2022: Newfoundland Growlers

Career highlights
- NBL Rwanda champion (2021)

Keanau Dennis Post (born September 4, 1992) is a Canadian basketball player. He played college basketball for Southwestern Illinois and Missouri.

== High school career ==
Post began his high school career at Oak Bay High School where he played for head coach Josh Elsdon. He averaged 12.5 points in league action for Oak Bay and led his club to the 2009-10 AAA Regional Championship while being named tournament All-Star. For his last year of high school, he transferred to Westwind Academy.

== College career ==
Post began his college career at Southwestern Illinois where he became one of the country's top junior college players as a sophomore after averaging 12.3 points and 8.3 rebounds and earning Second Team Junior College All-America. As a junior, he transferred to Missouri and as a senior he averaged 4.0 points and 3.6 rebounds in 29 games.

== Professional career ==
After going undrafted in the 2015 NBA draft, Post signed with Raptors 905 on October 31, 2015, as an affiliate player. On November 14, he made his debut with the Raptors in an 83–80 loss to the Fort Wayne Mad Ants, recording six points and six rebounds in 19 minutes off the bench. On the 2015–16 season, he averaged 2.8 points, 2.4 rebounds and 0.3 blocks in 36 games.

On October 23, 2016, Post signed with Al-Nasr of the Saudi Premier League.

On August 24, 2019, he has signed with Polpharma Starogard Gdański of the Polish Basketball League.

On January 1, 2020, he has signed with Peja of the Kosovo Basketball Superleague. However, Post did not play a game with the team and instead joined Qatar Club. In five games, he averaged 13.4 points, 12.2 rebounds, 1.2 assists and 2.4 blocks per game. Post signed with Al Hala of the Bahraini Premier League on November 6.

In September 2021, Post joined REG BBC of the Rwandan NBL. He helped the team capture their second ever NBL championship.

On February 23, 2022, Post joined Taiwan Beer of the Super Basketball League.

== Personal life ==
The son of a Jamaican father and a Canadian mother (Jazmynn Post), he grew up on the Caribbean beaches of Negril and Grenada, where he initially practiced swimming, running and playing soccer.
