= Takanobu Nishikawa =

Japanese basketball player (born 1992)

Takanobu Nishikawa 西川貴之
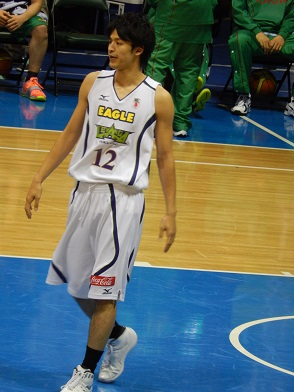

No. 7 – Saga Ballooners
- Position: Forward
- League: B.League

Personal information
- Born: January 14, 1992 (age 34) Sapporo, Hokkaido
- Listed height: 6 ft 5 in (1.96 m)
- Listed weight: 194 lb (88 kg)

Career information
- High school: Tokaidai 4 (Sapporo, Hokkaido)
- College: Meiji University
- Playing career: 2014–present

Career history
- 2014–2017: Levanga Hokkaido
- 2017-2019: SeaHorses Mikawa
- 2019-2021: San-en NeoPhoenix
- 2021: Ibaraki Robots
- 2021-: Saga Ballooners

Takanobu Nishikawa (born January 14, 1992) is a Japanese professional basketball player who last played for the Saga Ballooners of the B.League in Japan. He played college basketball for Meiji University. He represented his country for the 2018 William Jones Cup.
