= Leo Vendrame =

Japanese basketball player

Leo Vendrame ベンドラメ礼生
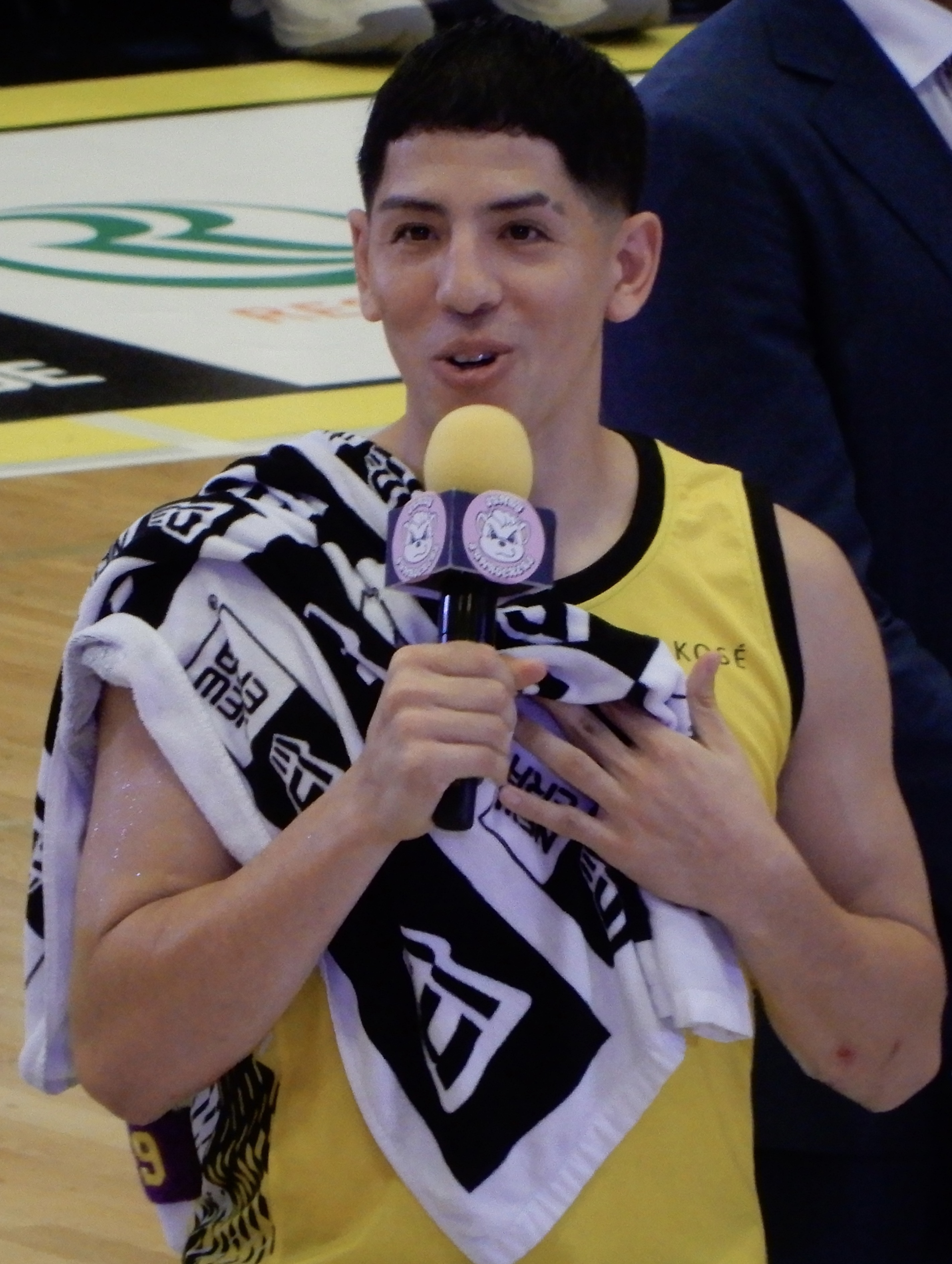
- Vendrame with Sun Rockers in 2025

No. 9 – Sun Rockers Shibuya
- Position: Point guard
- League: B.League

Personal information
- Born: November 14, 1993 (age 33) Chikushino, Fukuoka, Japan
- Listed height: 6 ft 0 in (1.83 m)
- Listed weight: 174 lb (79 kg)

Career information
- High school: Nobeoka Gakuen (Nobeoka, Miyazaki)
- College: Tokai University
- Playing career: 2016–present

Career history
- 2016–present: Sun Rockers Shibuya

Leo Vendrame (ベンドラメ礼生, Bendorame Reo) is a Brazilian-Japanese professional basketball player for the Sun Rockers Shibuya of the B.League.

== Playing career ==
He currently plays for the Sun Rockers Shibuya club of the B.League in Japan.

He represented Japan's national basketball team at the 2018 Asian Games in Jakarta–Palembang, Indonesia.

== Career statistics ==
Legend
GP	Games played	GS	Games started	MPG	Minutes per game
FG%	Field goal percentage	3P%	3-point field goal percentage	FT%	Free throw percentage
RPG	Rebounds per game	APG	Assists per game	SPG	Steals per game
BPG	Blocks per game	PPG	Points per game	**Bold**	Career high

Year	Team	GP	GS	MPG	FG%	3P%	FT%	RPG	APG	SPG	BPG	TO	PPG
2015-16	Hitachi	17		5.9	.333	.250	1.00	1.1	0.5	0.7	0.1	0.8	1.5
2016-17	Shibuya	49	27	22.3	.404	33.0	71.6	2.4	2.7	1.7	0.2	1.8	8.4
2017-18	Shibuya	59	27	25.3	.407	33.3	77.1	2.4	2.4	1.4	0.0	1.7	11.2
2018-19	Shibuya	60	60	29.3	.427	38.1	68.6	2.4	4.4	0.9	0.1	2.4	11.1
