= Yuki Mitsuhara =

Japanese basketball player

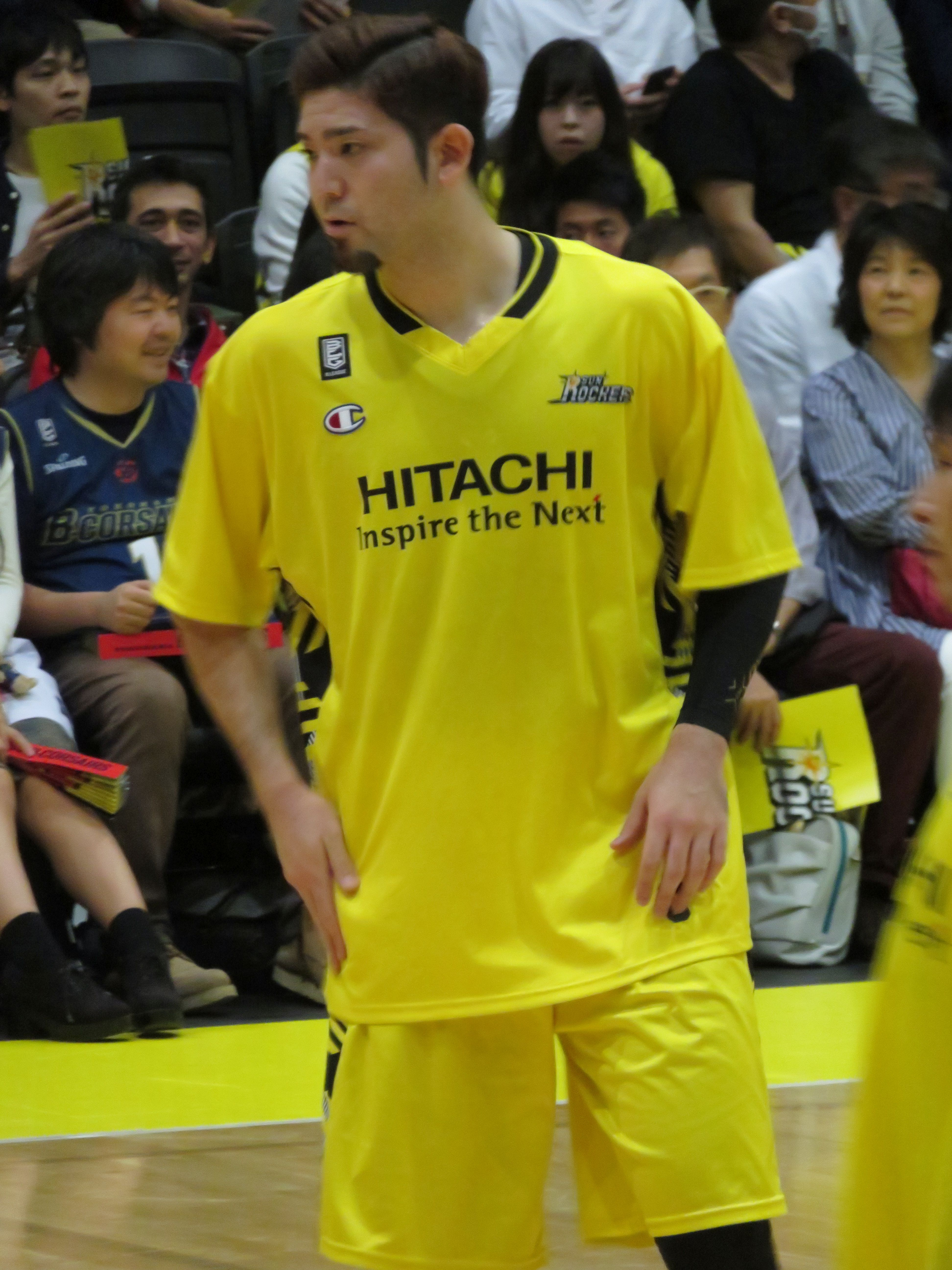
- Mitsuhara in 2018

No. 32 – Saga Ballooners
- Position: Power forward
- League: B.League

Personal information
- Born: December 27, 1989 (age 36) Yokohama, Kanagawa
- Listed height: 6 ft 6 in (1.98 m)
- Listed weight: 225 lb (102 kg)

Career information
- High school: Noshiro Technical (Noshiro, Akita)
- College: Tokai University (2008–2012)
- Playing career: 2012–present

Career history
- 2012–2019: Hitachi SunRockers
- 2019-2022: Ryukyu Golden Kings
- 2022-: Saga Ballooners

Career highlights
- Japanese High School Champions
Medals
Representing Japan
William Jones Cup
| Bronze medal – third place | 2010 Taipei | Team |

Yuki Mitsuhara (満原 優樹, Mitsuhara Yūki; born December 27, 1989) is a Japanese professional basketball player for the Saga Ballooners of the B.League in Japan.

He also has played a role as a member of the Japanese national team. As a member of the national team, he participated in the EABA Championship 2017, and praised the coach Luka Pavicevic.

Mitsuhara went 9-for-12 from the field in a 23-point outing against the Brave Thunders on April 22, 2017. On October 29, he scored 11 points on 3-for-3 shooting in a win against B-Corsairs. Mitsuhara went 3-for-14 from the field and scored 12 points in a loss to Alvark on December 23.

== Stats ==
Legend
| GP | Games played | GS | Games started | MPG | Minutes per game |
| FG% | Field goal percentage | 3P% | 3-point field goal percentage | FT% | Free throw percentage |
| RPG | Rebounds per game | APG | Assists per game | SPG | Steals per game |
| BPG | Blocks per game | PPG | Points per game | **Bold** | Career high |

=== Regular season ===
| Year | Team | GP | GS | MPG | FG% | 3P% | FT% | RPG | APG | SPG | BPG | PPG |
|---|---|---|---|---|---|---|---|---|---|---|---|---|
| 2013–14 | Hitachi | 53 | 5 | 15.3 | .351 | .369 | .659 | 2.6 | 0.9 | 0.4 | 0.1 | 5.2 |
| 2014–15 | Hitachi | 49 | 6 | 12.6 | .370 | .245 | .679 | 3.1 | 0.6 | 0.2 | 0.1 | 4.5 |
| 2015–16 | Hitachi | 52 | | 10.4 | .374 | .258 | .636 | 2.1 | 0.4 | 0.2 | 0.1 | 3.2 |
| 2016–17 | Shibuya | 58 | 15 | 20.8 | .349 | .243 | .667 | 4.2 | 1.4 | 0.4 | 0.1 | 6.7 |
| 2017–18 | Shibuya | 57 | 42 | 20.1 | .361 | .209 | .689 | 4.6 | 1.8 | 0.4 | 0.1 | 6.2 |
| 2018–19 | Shibuya | 54 | 10 | 10.52 | .343 | .222 | .579 | 2.6 | 0.7 | 0.24 | 0.04 | 2.1 |

=== Early cup games ===
| Year | Team | GP | GS | MPG | FG% | 3P% | FT% | RPG | APG | SPG | BPG | PPG |
|---|---|---|---|---|---|---|---|---|---|---|---|---|
| 2017 | Shibuya | 2 | 2 | 23.35 | .333 | .375 | 1.000 | 4.5 | 1.5 | 0 | 0 | 8.5 |
| 2018 | Shibuya | 3 | 2 | 26.54 | .368 | .000 | 1.000 | 6.3 | 2.3 | 0.33 | 0 | 5.3 |

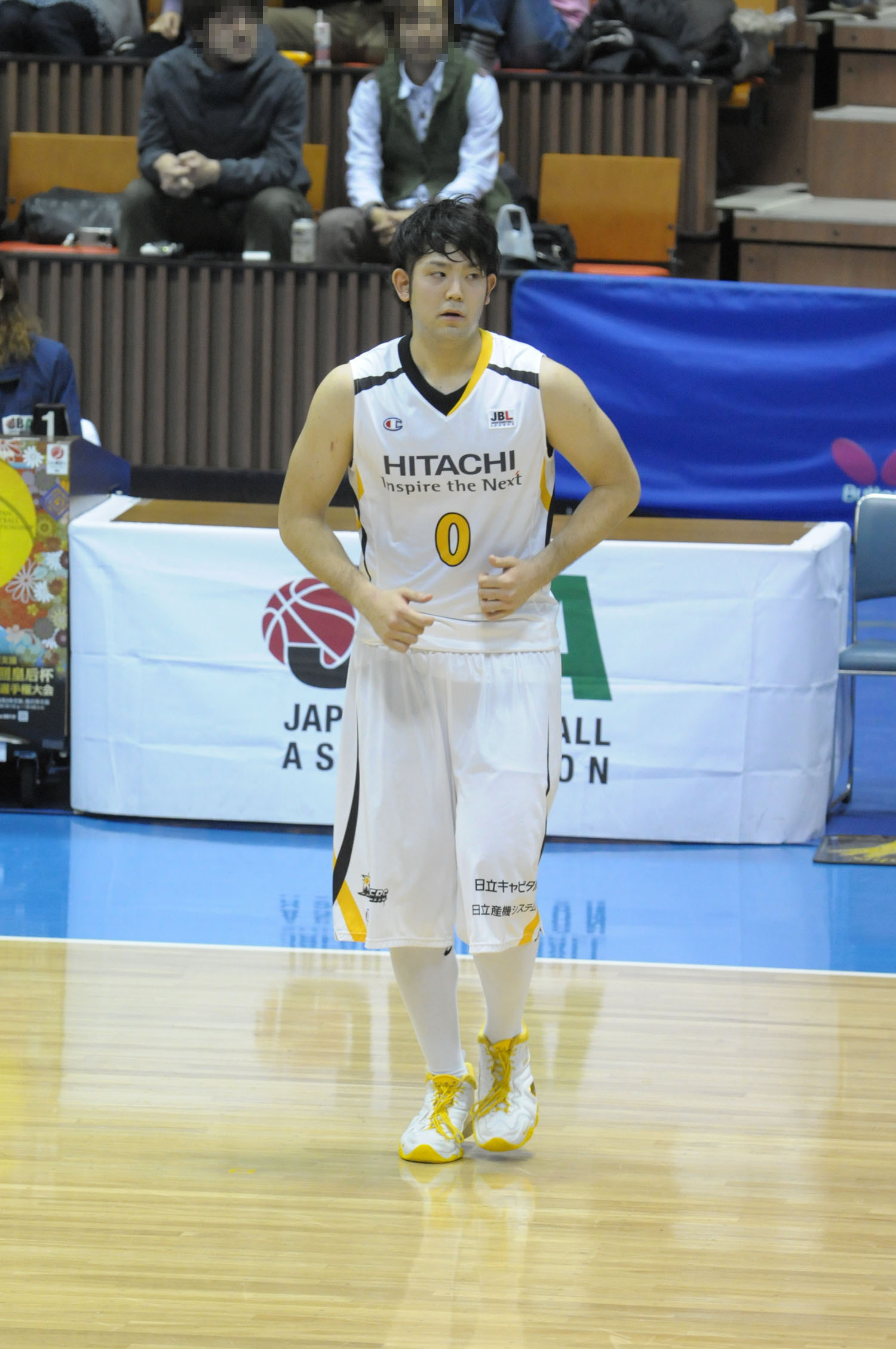
Mitsuhara in 2013
