= Mohammad Torabi =

Iranian basketball player

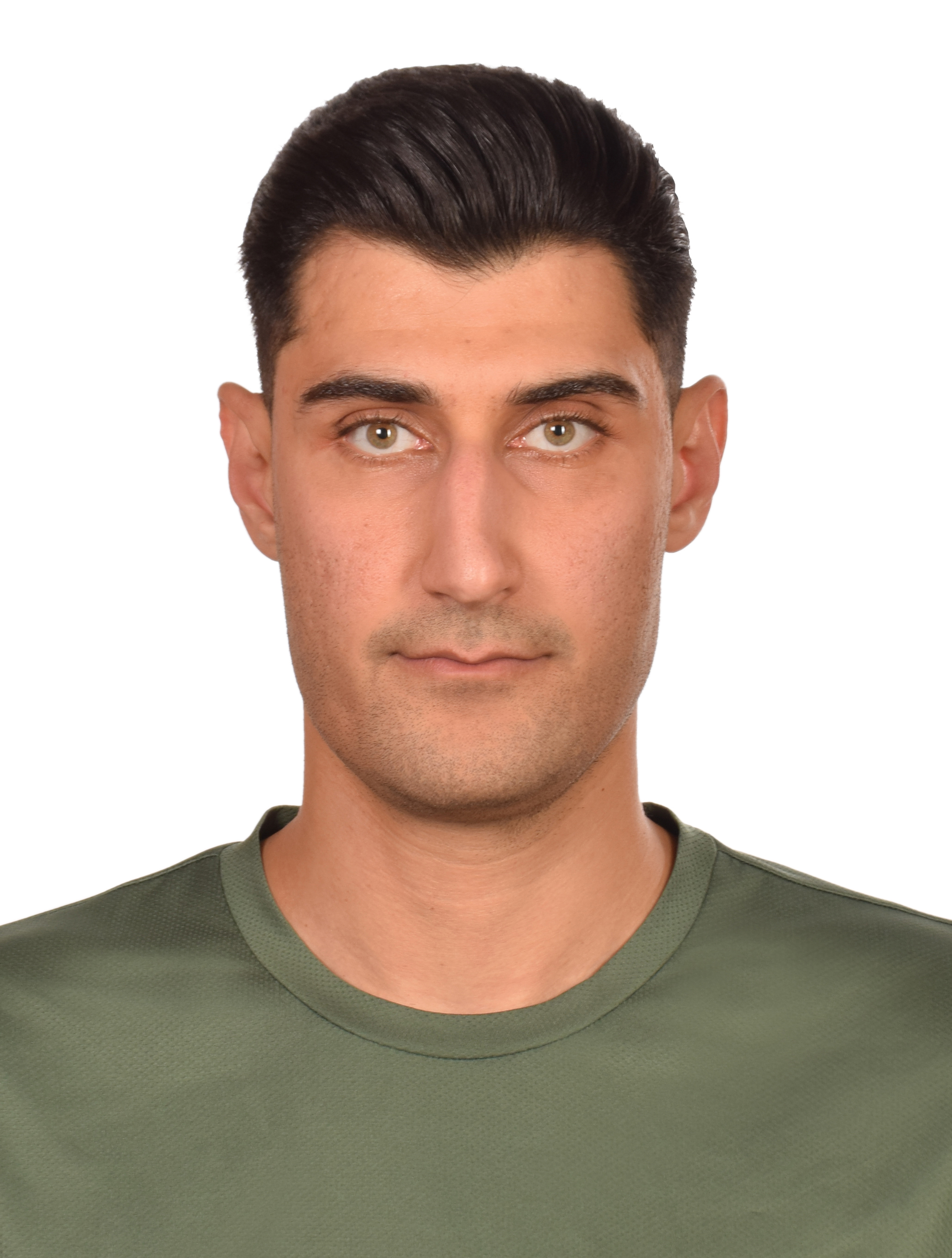

No. 21 – Foolad Hormozgan
- Position: Center
- League: Iranian Basketball Super League

Personal information
- Born: 16 September 1992 (age 34) Isfahan, Iran
- Listed height: 6 ft 10.7 in (2.10 m)
- Listed weight: 256 lb (116 kg)

Career information
- Playing career: 2013–present

Career history
- 2013: Foolad Mahan Isfahan
- 2014: Petrochimi Bandar Imam
- 2015: Chemidor Tehran
- 2016-2017: Nirooye Zamini
- 2018: Chemidor Tehran
- 2019: Palayesh Naft Abadan
- 2020: Zob Ahan Isfahan
- 2021: Mes Rafsanjan
- 2022-present: Naft Abadan
- 2023-present: Foolad Hormozgan

Mohammad Torabi (Persian: محمد ترابی; born 16 September 1992 in Isfahan) is an Iranian professional basketball player for Palayesh Naft Abadan of the Iranian Basketball Super League.

== Career ==
- Mohammad Torabi has a history of playing for the national team.
- He accompanied the Iranian national basketball team in the 2023 Hangzhou Asian Games.

== Other Websites ==
Mohammad Torabi on Instagram
