= Liu Cheng (basketball) =

Taiwanese basketball player (born 1990)

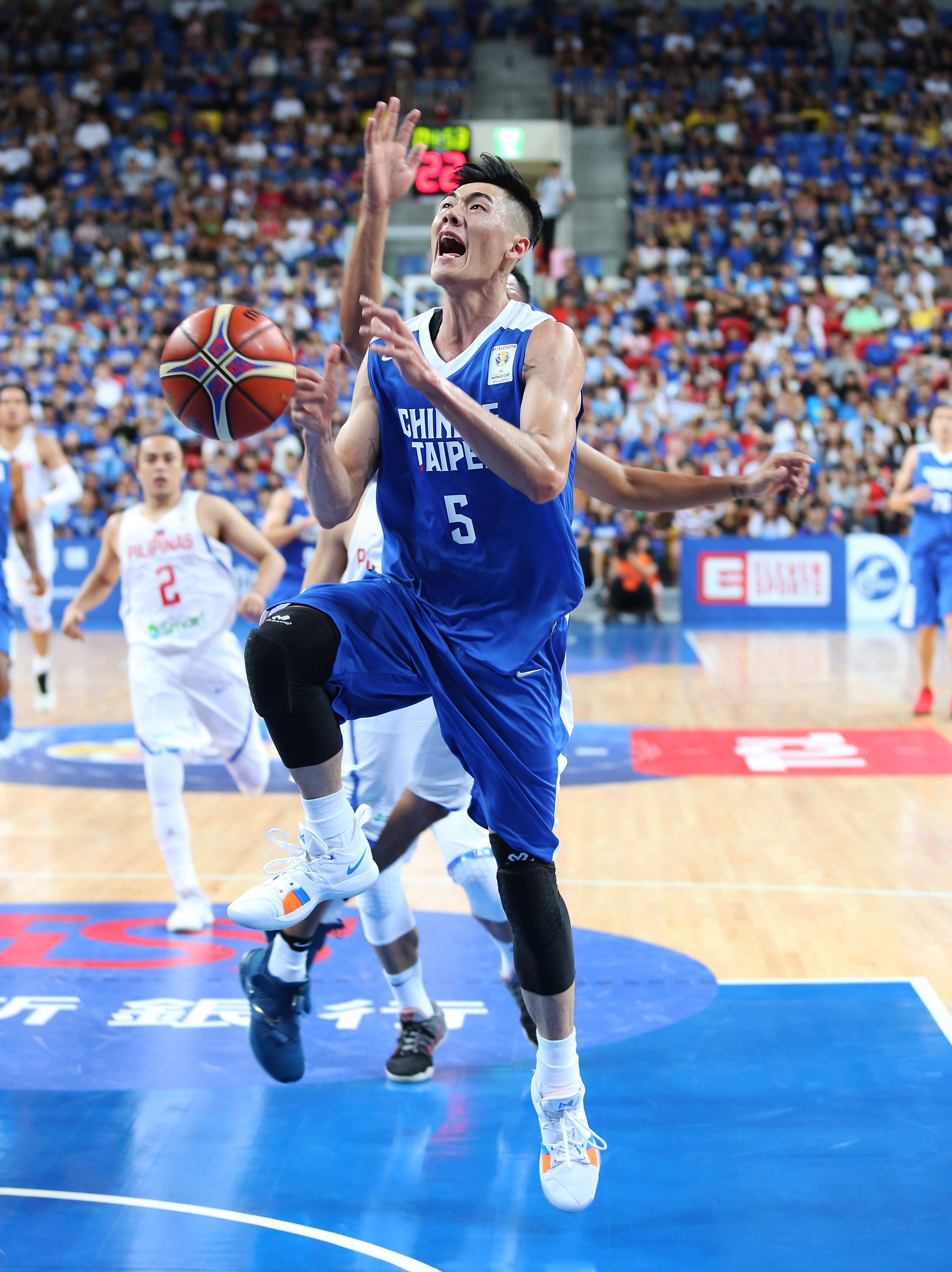
- Liu Cheng in 2018

No. 5 – Shanghai Sharks
- Position: Shooting guard
- League: CBA

Personal information
- Born: 24 November 1990 (age 35) Miaoli County, Taiwan
- Listed height: 1.95 m (6 ft 5 in)
- Listed weight: 87 kg (192 lb)

Career information
- College: MingDao (2008–2011)
- Playing career: 2011–present

Career history
- 2011–2012: Jeoutai Technology
- 2012–2016: Taiwan Beer
- 2016–2020: Zhejiang Lions
- 2020–present: Shanghai Sharks

Career highlights
- CBA champion (2026); 2× CBA Club Cup Champion (2025, 2026); SBL champion (2016); SBL MVP (2014); SBL All-Star Game (2016); SBL All-Star Game MVP (2016); 3× SBL First Team (2014–2016); 3× SBL Steal King (2012, 2014, 2016); CBA Rookie of the Year (2018); SBL Rookie of the Year (2012); SBL Frontcourt Defensive Player of the Year (2016)
Medals
Men's basketball
Representing Chinese Taipei
East Asian Games
Gold medal – first place	2013 Tianjin	Team
FIBA Asia Challenge
Silver medal – second place	2014 Wuhan	Team
EABA Championship
Gold medal – first place	2017 Nagano	Team

Liu Cheng (Chinese: 劉錚; born 24 November 1990) is a Taiwanese professional basketball player for the Shanghai Sharks of the Chinese Basketball Association (CBA). Standing at 1.95 m (6 ft 5 in), he has played in the shooting guard and small forward position.

== Professional career ==
=== Super Basketball League ===
Liu Cheng began his career with Jeoutai Technology of the Super Basketball League (SBL) in 2011 before moving to the Taiwan Beer the following year with whom he won the SBL championship in 2016.

=== Zhejiang Lions ===
On 9 May 2016, Liu Cheng joined the Zhejiang Lions in the Chinese Basketball Association (CBA).

=== Shanghai Sharks ===
On 9 September 2020, the CBA officially registered Liu Cheng with the Shanghai Sharks. He signed a 2+1 year contract with the Sharks, with a team option for the third year, and it was a Category C contract.

On 10 July 2023, the Shanghai Sharks announced that they had renewed Liu Cheng's contract. On 2 September 2024, the Sharks announced that they had renewed Liu Cheng's contract, changing his jersey number to 11. The contract was a 1+1 year Category E contract, with a team option for the second year.

== National team career ==
On 31 July 2025, Liu Cheng was selected for the Chinese Taipei national team to participate in the 2025 FIBA Asia Cup. On 25 February 2026, he was selected for the 12-man roster of the Chinese Taipei team for the second stage of the 2027 FIBA Basketball World Cup Asian qualifiers.
