= Philippines men's national basketball team results =

This is a list of the Philippines men's national basketball team results. This list includes non-competitive matches against foreign teams.

== 2026 ==
Date	Opponent	Result	Score	Venue	Competition
February 26	New Zealand	L	66–69	SM Mall of Asia Arena, Pasay, Philippines	2027 FIBA World Cup qualification R1
March 1	Australia	L	66–93	SM Mall of Asia Arena, Pasay, Philippines	2027 FIBA World Cup qualification R1
June 28	(New Zealand) Manawatu Jets	W	90–61	Fly Palmy Arena, Palmerston North, New Zealand	Exhibition game
June 30	(New Zealand) Franklin Bulls	W	94–66	Franklin Pool and Leisure Centre, Pukekohe, New Zealand	Exhibition game
July 3	New Zealand	L	102–106 (2OT)	Spark Arena, Auckland, New Zealand	2027 FIBA World Cup qualification R1
July 6	Australia	L	49–92	Perth Arena, Perth, Australia	2027 FIBA World Cup qualification R1
August 20	(South Korea) Ulsan Hyundai Mobis Phoebus	W	81–76	SMC Sports Complex, Pasig, Philippines	Exhibition game
August 28	Jordan	W	82–81 (OT)	SM Mall of Asia Arena, Pasay, Philippines	2027 FIBA World Cup qualification R2
August 30	Iran	W	68–56	SM Mall of Asia Arena, Pasay, Philippines	2027 FIBA World Cup qualification R2
September 4	South Korea	L	55–81	Suwon KT Sonicboom Arena, Suwon, South Korea	Exhibition game
September 6	South Korea	L	42–69	Suwon KT Sonicboom Arena, Suwon, South Korea	Exhibition game
September 11	Bahrain	L	85–89	Aichi International Arena, Nagoya, Japan	Asian Games GS
September 12	Kazakhstan	W	109–78	Aichi International Arena, Nagoya, Japan	Asian Games GS
September 14	China	L	61–105	Aichi International Arena, Nagoya, Japan	Asian Games GS
November 27	Syria	TBD	TBD	Karisma Arena, Seremban, Malaysia	2027 FIBA World Cup qualification R2
November 29	Iran	TBD	TBD	Karisma Arena, Seremban, Malaysia	2027 FIBA World Cup qualification R2

== 2025 ==
Date	Opponent	Result	Score	Venue	Competition
February 14	Qatar	W	74–71	Qatar University Sports and Events Complex, Doha, Qatar	Doha International Cup
February 15	Lebanon	L	54–75	Qatar University Sports and Events Complex, Doha, Qatar	Doha International Cup
February 15	Egypt	L	55–86	Qatar University Sports and Events Complex, Doha, Qatar	Doha International Cup
February 20	Chinese Taipei	L	84–91	Taipei Heping Basketball Gymnasium, Taipei, Taiwan	FIBA Asia Cup qualification
February 23	New Zealand	L	70–87	Spark Arena, Auckland, New Zealand	FIBA Asia Cup qualification
July 28	Macau Black Bears	W	103–98	Araneta Coliseum, Quezon City, Philippines	Exhibition game
August 2	Jordan	W	75–61	Al Ahli Sports Club, Jeddah, Saudi Arabia	Exhibition game
August 5	Chinese Taipei	L	87–95	Jeddah, Saudi Arabia	FIBA Asia Cup
August 7	New Zealand	L	86–94	Jeddah, Saudi Arabia	FIBA Asia Cup
August 9	Iraq	W	66–57	Jeddah, Saudi Arabia	FIBA Asia Cup
August 11	Saudi Arabia	W	95–88	Jeddah, Saudi Arabia	FIBA Asia Cup
August 13	Australia	L	60–84	Jeddah, Saudi Arabia	FIBA Asia Cup
November 28	Guam	W	87–46	UOG Calvo Field House, Mangilao, Guam	2027 FIBA World Cup qualification R1
December 1	Guam	W	95–71	Blue Eagle Gym, Quezon City, Philippines	2027 FIBA World Cup qualification R1
December 14	Malaysia	W	83–58	Nimibutr Stadium, Bangkok, Thailand	SEA Games
December 15	Vietnam	W	78–67	Nimibutr Stadium, Bangkok, Thailand	SEA Games
December 18	Indonesia	W	71–68	Nimibutr Stadium, Bangkok, Thailand	SEA Games
December 19	Thailand	W	70–64	Nimibutr Stadium, Bangkok, Thailand	SEA Games

== 2024 ==
Date	Opponent	Result	Score	Venue	Competition
February 22	Hong Kong	W	94–64	Tsuen Wan Sports Centre, Tsuen Wan, Hong Kong	2025 FIBA Asia Cup qualification
February 25	Chinese Taipei	W	106–53	PhilSports Arena, Pasig, Philippines	2025 FIBA Asia Cup qualification
June 24	(Chinese Taipei) Taiwan Mustangs	W	74–64	PhilSports Arena, Pasig, Philippines	Exhibition game
June 27	Turkey	L	73–84	BJK Akatlar Arena, Istanbul, Turkey	Exhibition game
June 29	Poland	L	80–82	Zagłębiowski Park Sportowy, Sosnowiec, Poland	Exhibition game
July 3	Latvia	W	89–80	Arena Riga, Riga, Latvia	2024 Summer Olympics qualification
July 4	Georgia	L	94–96	Arena Riga, Riga, Latvia	2024 Summer Olympics qualification
July 6	Brazil	L	60–71	Arena Riga, Riga, Latvia	2024 Summer Olympics qualification
November 21	New Zealand	W	93–89	SM Mall of Asia Arena, Pasay, Philippines	2025 FIBA Asia Cup qualification
November 24	Hong Kong	W	93–54	SM Mall of Asia Arena, Pasay, Philippines	2025 FIBA Asia Cup qualification

== 2023 ==
Date	Opponent	Result	Score	Venue	Competition
February 24	Lebanon	W	107–96	Philippine Arena, Bocaue, Philippines	FIBA World Cup qualification R2
February 27	Jordan	L	90–91	Philippine Arena, Bocaue, Philippines	FIBA World Cup qualification R2
May 9	Malaysia	W	94–49	Morodok Techo National Sports Center, Phnom Penh, Cambodia	SEA Games
May 11	Cambodia	L	68–79	Morodok Techo National Sports Center, Phnom Penh, Cambodia	SEA Games
May 13	Singapore	W	105–45	Morodok Techo National Sports Center, Phnom Penh, Cambodia	SEA Games
May 15	Indonesia	W	84–76	Morodok Techo National Sports Center, Phnom Penh, Cambodia	SEA Games
May 16	Cambodia	W	80–69	Morodok Techo National Sports Center, Phnom Penh, Cambodia	SEA Games
June 27	Estonia (Note: Junior national team)	L	71–81	Kalev Sports Hall, Tallinn, Estonia	Exhibition game
June 28	Finland	L	85–89	Kalev Sports Hall, Tallinn, Estonia	Exhibition game
July 1	Ukraine U20	W	70–61	Žalgiris Arena, Kaunas, Lithuania	Exhibition game
July 2	Ukraine U20	W	84–74	Žalgiris Arena, Kaunas, Lithuania	Exhibition game
July 4	Lithuania Selection	L	80–90	Žalgiris Arena, Kaunas, Lithuania	Exhibition game
July 8	Lithuania Universiade	W	125–102	Žalgiris Arena, Kaunas, Lithuania	Exhibition game
August 3	Iran B	W	76–65	Heyuan Gymnasium, Heyuan, China	Heyuan WUS International Basketball Tournament
August 4	Senegal	L	64–72	Jiangman En Ping Sport Gymnasium, Enping, China	Heyuan WUS International Basketball Tournament
August 6	Senegal	W	75–63	Heyuan Gymnasium, Heyuan, China	Heyuan WUS International Basketball Tournament
August 7	Iran B	W	63–48	Xiaoqing Sport Center, Zhaoqing, China	Heyuan WUS International Basketball Tournament
August 18	Ivory Coast	W	85–62	PhilSports Arena, Pasig, Philippines	Exhibition game
August 20	Montenegro	L	87–102	PhilSports Arena, Pasig, Philippines	Exhibition game
August 21	Mexico	L	77–84	PhilSports Arena, Pasig, Philippines	Exhibition game
August 25	Dominican Republic	L	81–87	Philippine Arena, Bocaue, Philippines	FIBA World Cup
August 27	Angola	L	70–80	Araneta Coliseum, Quezon City, Philippines	FIBA World Cup
August 29	Italy	L	83–90	Araneta Coliseum, Quezon City, Philippines	FIBA World Cup
August 31	South Sudan	L	68–87	Araneta Coliseum, Quezon City, Philippines	FIBA World Cup
September 2	China	W	96–75	Araneta Coliseum, Quezon City, Philippines	FIBA World Cup
September 22	(South Korea) Changwon LG Sakers	W	86–81	PhilSports Arena, Pasig, Philippines	Exhibition game
September 26	Bahrain	W	89–61	Hangzhou Olympic Sports Centre Gymnasium, Hangzhou, China	2022 Asian Games
September 28	Thailand	W	87–72	Zhejiang University Zijingang Gymnasium, Hangzhou, China	2022 Asian Games
September 30	Jordan	L	62–87	Hangzhou Olympic Sports Centre Gymnasium, Hangzhou, China	2022 Asian Games
October 2	Qatar	W	80–41	Zhejiang University Zijingang Gymnasium, Hangzhou, China	2022 Asian Games
October 3	Iran	W	84–83	Zhejiang University Zijingang Gymnasium, Hangzhou, China	2022 Asian Games
October 4	China	W	77–76	Hangzhou Olympic Sports Centre Gymnasium, Hangzhou, China	2022 Asian Games
October 6	Jordan	W	70–60	Hangzhou Olympic Sports Centre Gymnasium, Hangzhou, China	2022 Asian Games

== 2022 ==
Date	Opponent	Result	Score	Venue	Competition
February 25	India	W	88–64	Smart Araneta Coliseum, Quezon City, Philippines	2023 FIBA World Cup qualification R1
February 27	New Zealand	L	63–88	Smart Araneta Coliseum, Quezon City, Philippines	2023 FIBA World Cup qualification R1
May 16	Thailand	W	76–73	Thanh Trì District Sporting Hall, Hanoi, Vietnam	2021 SEA Games
May 17	Cambodia	W	100–32	Thanh Trì District Sporting Hall, Hanoi, Vietnam	2021 SEA Games
May 18	Singapore	W	88–37	Thanh Trì District Sporting Hall, Hanoi, Vietnam	2021 SEA Games
May 19	Vietnam	W	88–60	Thanh Trì District Sporting Hall, Hanoi, Vietnam	2021 SEA Games
May 21	Malaysia	W	94–87	Thanh Trì District Sporting Hall, Hanoi, Vietnam	2021 SEA Games
May 22	Indonesia	L	81–85	Thanh Trì District Sporting Hall, Hanoi, Vietnam	2021 SEA Games
June 17	South Korea	L	92–96	Anyang Gymnasium, Anyang, South Korea	KB Kookmin Bank Invitational
June 18	South Korea	L	102–106	Anyang Gymnasium, Anyang, South Korea	KB Kookmin Bank Invitational
June 30	New Zealand	L	60–106	Eventfinda Stadium, Auckland, New Zealand	2023 FIBA World Cup qualification R1
July 3	India	W	79–63	SM Mall of Asia Arena, Pasay City, Philippines	2023 FIBA World Cup qualification R1
July 13	Lebanon	L	80–95	Istora Gelora Bung Karno, Jakarta, Indonesia	2022 FIBA Asia Cup Group Phase
July 15	India	W	101–59	Istora Gelora Bung Karno, Jakarta, Indonesia	2022 FIBA Asia Cup Group Phase
July 17	New Zealand	L	75–92	Istora Gelora Bung Karno, Jakarta, Indonesia	2022 FIBA Asia Cup Group Phase
July 19	Japan	L	81–102	Istora Gelora Bung Karno, Jakarta, Indonesia	2022 FIBA Asia Cup Play-off Round
August 25	Lebanon	L	81–85	Stade Nouhad Naufal, Zouk Mikael, Lebanon	2023 FIBA World Cup qualification R2
August 29	Saudi Arabia	W	84–46	SM Mall of Asia Arena, Pasay City, Philippines	2023 FIBA World Cup qualification R2
November 10	Jordan	W	74–66	Prince Hamzah Hall, Amman, Jordan	2023 FIBA World Cup qualification R2
November 13	Saudi Arabia	W	76–63	King Abdullah Sports City Hall, Jeddah, Saudi Arabia	2023 FIBA World Cup qualification R2

== 2021 ==
Date	Opponent	Result	Score	Venue	Competition
June 16	South Korea	W	81–78	AUF Sports and Cultural Center, Angeles, Philippines	FIBA Asia Cup qualification R1
June 18	Indonesia	W	76–51	AUF Sports and Cultural Center, Angeles, Philippines	FIBA Asia Cup qualification R1
June 20	South Korea	W	82–77	AUF Sports and Cultural Center, Angeles, Philippines	FIBA Asia Cup qualification R1
June 23	China	D	79–79	AUF Sports and Cultural Center, Angeles, Philippines	Exhibition game
June 30	Serbia	L	76–83	Aleksandar Nikolić Hall, Belgrade, Serbia	2020 Summer Olympics qualification
July 1	Dominican Republic	L	67–94	Aleksandar Nikolić Hall, Belgrade, Serbia	2020 Summer Olympics qualification
July 26	Egypt	L	60–73	Prince Hamzah Sport Hall, Amman, Jordan	King Abdullah Cup
July 27	Saudi Arabia	W	77–62	Prince Hamzah Sport Hall, Amman, Jordan	King Abdullah Cup
July 28	Jordan B	W	90–63	Prince Hamzah Sport Hall, Amman, Jordan	King Abdullah Cup
July 29	Tunisia	W	74–73 (OT)	Prince Hamzah Sport Hall, Amman, Jordan	King Abdullah Cup
July 30	Jordan	L	72–84	Prince Hamzah Sport Hall, Amman, Jordan	King Abdullah Cup
July 31	Jordan	L	74–84	Prince Hamzah Sport Hall, Amman, Jordan	King Abdullah Cup SF
August 1	Tunisia	L	68–80	Prince Hamzah Sport Hall, Amman, Jordan	King Abdullah Cup 3rd place

== 2020 ==
Date	Opponent	Result	Score	Venue	Competition
February 23	Indonesia	W	100–70	The BritAma Arena, Jakarta, Indonesia	2021 FIBA Asia Cup qualification R1
November 27	Thailand	W	93–61	Khalifa Sports City Hall, Isa, Bahrain	2021 FIBA Asia Cup qualification R1
November 30	Thailand	W	93–69	Khalifa Sports City Hall, Isa, Bahrain	2021 FIBA Asia Cup qualification R1

== 2019 ==
Date	Opponent	Result	Score	Venue	Competition
February 21	Qatar	W	84–46	Al-Gharafa Sports Club Multi-Purpose Hall, Doha, Qatar	FIBA World Cup qualification R2
February 24	Kazakhstan	W	93–75	Saryarka Velodrome, Astana, Kazakhstan	FIBA World Cup qualification R2
August 6	DR Congo	W	102–80	Palacio Multiusos de Guadalajara, Guadalajara, Spain	Exhibition game
August 7	Ivory Coast	W	94–83	Palacio Multiusos de Guadalajara, Guadalajara, Spain	Exhibition game
August 9	DR Congo	L	71–82	Palacio de Deportes José María Martín Carpena, Málaga, Spain	Malaga Tournament
August 10	Ivory Coast	W	73–63	Palacio de Deportes José María Martín Carpena, Málaga, Spain	Malaga Tournament
August 23	(Australia) Adelaide 36ers	W	92–83	Meralco Gym, Pasig, Philippines	Goodwill Games
August 25	(Australia) Adelaide 36ers	L	75–85	Meralco Gym, Pasig, Philippines	Goodwill Games
August 31	Italy	L	62–108	Foshan International Sports and Cultural Center, Foshan, China	FIBA World Cup R1
September 2	Serbia	L	67–126	Foshan International Sports and Cultural Center, Foshan, China	FIBA World Cup R1
September 4	Angola	L	81–84 (OT)	Foshan International Sports and Cultural Center, Foshan, China	FIBA World Cup R1
September 6	Tunisia	L	67–86	Wukesong Arena, Beijing, China	FIBA World Cup CR
September 8	Iran	L	75–95	Wukesong Arena, Beijing, China	FIBA World Cup CR
December 4	Singapore	W	110–58	Mall of Asia Arena, Pasay, Philippines	SEA Games
December 6	Vietnam	W	110–69	Mall of Asia Arena, Pasay, Philippines	SEA Games
December 7	Myanmar	W	136–67	Mall of Asia Arena, Pasay, Philippines	SEA Games
December 9	Indonesia	W	97–70	Mall of Asia Arena, Pasay, Philippines	SEA Games
December 10	Thailand	W	115–81	Mall of Asia Arena, Pasay, Philippines	SEA Games

== 2018 ==
Date	Opponent	Result	Score	Venue	Competition
February 22	Australia	L	68–84	Margaret Court Arena, Melbourne, Australia	2019 FIBA World Cup qualification R1
February 25	Japan	W	89–84	Mall of Asia Arena, Pasay, Philippines	2019 FIBA World Cup qualification R1
June 29	Chinese Taipei	W	93–71	Taipei Heping Basketball Gymnasium, Taipei, Taiwan	2019 FIBA World Cup qualification R1
July 2	Australia	L	53–89	Philippine Arena, Bocaue, Philippines	2019 FIBA World Cup qualification R1
August 16	Kazakhstan	W	96–59	GBK Basketball Hall, Jakarta, Indonesia	Asian Games
August 21	China	L	80–82	GBK Basketball Hall, Jakarta, Indonesia	Asian Games
August 27	South Korea	L	82–91	GBK Basketball Hall, Jakarta, Indonesia	Asian Games
August 28	Japan	W	113–80	GBK Basketball Hall, Jakarta, Indonesia	Asian Games
August 31	Syria	W	109–55	Istora Gelora Bung Karno, Jakarta, Indonesia	Asian Games
September 13	Iran	L	73–81	Azadi Basketball Hall, Tehran, Iran	2019 FIBA World Cup qualification R2
September 17	Qatar	W	92–81	Smart Araneta Coliseum, Quezon City, Philippines	2019 FIBA World Cup qualification R2
November 19	Jordan	L	92–99	Pasig, Philippines	Exhibition game
November 21	Jordan	W	82–73	Pasig, Philippines	Exhibition game
November 23	Lebanon	L	68–74	Quezon City, Philippines	Exhibition game
November 25	Lebanon	L	60–71	Pasig, Philippines	Exhibition game
November 30	Kazakhstan	L	88–92	Mall of Asia Arena, Pasay, Philippines	2019 FIBA World Cup qualification R2
December 3	Iran	L	70–78	Mall of Asia Arena, Pasay, Philippines	2019 FIBA World Cup qualification R2

== 2017 ==
Date	Opponent	Result	Score	Venue	Competition
May 12	Myanmar	W	147–40	Smart Araneta Coliseum, Quezon City, Philippines	SEABA Championship
May 13	Singapore	W	113–66	Smart Araneta Coliseum, Quezon City, Philippines	SEABA Championship
May 14	Malaysia	W	106–51	Smart Araneta Coliseum, Quezon City, Philippines	SEABA Championship
May 16	Thailand	W	108–53	Smart Araneta Coliseum, Quezon City, Philippines	SEABA Championship
May 17	Vietnam	W	107–52	Smart Araneta Coliseum, Quezon City, Philippines	SEABA Championship
May 18	Indonesia	W	97–64	Smart Araneta Coliseum, Quezon City, Philippines	SEABA Championship
July 15	Team Canada 150	L	77–90	Taipei Peace International Basketball Hall, Taipei, Taiwan	William Jones Cup
July 16	Republic of China Blue (Chinese Taipei)	W	88–72	Taipei Peace International Basketball Hall, Taipei, Taiwan	William Jones Cup
July 17	Republic of China White (Chinese Taipei)	W	93–82	Taipei Peace International Basketball Hall, Taipei, Taiwan	William Jones Cup
July 18	Japan U24	W	100–85	Taipei Peace International Basketball Hall, Taipei, Taiwan	William Jones Cup
July 19	South Korea	L	72–83	Taipei Peace International Basketball Hall, Taipei, Taiwan	William Jones Cup
July 20	Iraq	W	84–75	Taipei Peace International Basketball Hall, Taipei, Taiwan	William Jones Cup
July 21	Atletas All-Star Lithuania	L	80–91	Taipei Peace International Basketball Hall, Taipei, Taiwan	William Jones Cup
July 22	India	W	101–70	Taipei Peace International Basketball Hall, Taipei, Taiwan	William Jones Cup
July 23	Iran	W	90–82	Taipei Peace International Basketball Hall, Taipei, Taiwan	William Jones Cup
August 9	China	W	96–87	Nouhad Nawfal Stadium, Zouk Mikael, Lebanon	FIBA Asia Cup
August 11	Iraq	W	84–68	Nouhad Nawfal Stadium, Zouk Mikael, Lebanon	FIBA Asia Cup
August 13	Qatar	W	80–74	Nouhad Nawfal Stadium, Zouk Mikael, Lebanon	FIBA Asia Cup
August 16	South Korea	L	86–118	Nouhad Nawfal Stadium, Zouk Mikael, Lebanon	FIBA Asia Cup
August 19	Lebanon	L	87–106	Nouhad Nawfal Stadium, Zouk Mikael, Lebanon	FIBA Asia Cup
August 20	Jordan	W	75–70	Nouhad Nawfal Stadium, Zouk Mikael, Lebanon	FIBA Asia Cup
August 20	Thailand	W	81–74	MABA Stadium, Kuala Lumpur, Malaysia	SEA Games
August 22	Myanmar	W	129–34	MABA Stadium, Kuala Lumpur, Malaysia	SEA Games
August 23	Malaysia	W	98–66	MABA Stadium, Kuala Lumpur, Malaysia	SEA Games
August 25	Singapore	W	68–60	MABA Stadium, Kuala Lumpur, Malaysia	SEA Games
August 26	Indonesia	W	94–55	MABA Stadium, Kuala Lumpur, Malaysia	SEA Games
November 24	Japan	W	77–71	Komazawa Gymnasium, Tokyo, Japan	2019 FIBA World Cup qualification R1
November 25	Chinese Taipei	W	90–83	Smart Araneta Coliseum, Quezon City, Philippines	2019 FIBA World Cup qualification R1

== 2016 ==
Date	Opponent	Result	Score	Venue	Competition
May 22	Malaysia	W	108–84	Stadium 29, Bangkok, Thailand	SEABA Cup
May 24	Singapore	W	81–59	Stadium 29, Bangkok, Thailand	SEABA Cup
May 25	Indonesia	W	83–52	Stadium 29, Bangkok, Thailand	SEABA Cup
May 26	Thailand	W	66–65	Stadium 29, Bangkok, Thailand	SEABA Cup
May 28	Thailand	W	97–80	Stadium 29, Bangkok, Thailand	SEABA Cup F
June 7	Iran	W	71–64 (Note: The match followed a modified format with the score of both teams reverted to 0 after the end of each quarter. The scores of both teams would be 71–64 if the scores in all four quarters were add up.)	Gatorade Hoops Center, Mandaluyong, Philippines	Exhibition game
June 8	Iran	W	81–70	Smart Araneta Coliseum, Quezon City, Philippines	Exhibition game
June 21	Turkey	L	68–103	Abdi İpekçi Arena, Istanbul, Turkey	Exhibition game
June 25	Italy	L	70–106	Land Rover Arena, Bologna, Italy	Imperial Basketball City Tournament SF
June 26	China	W	72–69	Land Rover Arena, Bologna, Italy	Imperial Basketball City Tournament 3rd place
July 1	Turkey	L	76–84	Mall of Asia Arena, Pasay, Philippines	Exhibition game
July 5	France	L	84–93	Mall of Asia Arena, Pasay, Philippines	Summer Olympics qualification
July 6	New Zealand	L	80–89	Mall of Asia Arena, Pasay, Philippines	Summer Olympics qualification
September 9	India	L	83–91	Azadi Basketball Hall, Tehran, Iran	FIBA Asia Challenge R1
September 11	Chinese Taipei	L	76–87	Azadi Basketball Hall, Tehran, Iran	FIBA Asia Challenge R1
September 12	China	L	65–75	Azadi Basketball Hall, Tehran, Iran	FIBA Asia Challenge R2
September 13	Kazakhstan	W	98–86	Azadi Basketball Hall, Tehran, Iran	FIBA Asia Challenge R2
September 14	Jordan	L	105–119	Azadi Basketball Hall, Tehran, Iran	FIBA Asia Challenge R2

== 2015 ==
Date	Opponent	Result	Score	Venue	Competition
April 27	Indonesia	W	92–36	OCBC Arena, Kallang, Singapore	SEABA Championship
April 28	Laos	W	124–37	OCBC Arena, Kallang, Singapore	SEABA Championship
April 29	Malaysia	W	104–42	OCBC Arena, Kallang, Singapore	SEABA Championship
April 30	Brunei	W	140–29	OCBC Arena, Kallang, Singapore	SEABA Championship
May 1	Singapore	W	82–56	OCBC Arena, Kallang, Singapore	SEABA Championship
June 10	Indonesia	W	81–52	OCBC Arena Hall 1, Kallang, Singapore	SEA Games GS
June 11	Malaysia	W	100–48	OCBC Arena Hall 1, Kallang, Singapore	SEA Games GS
June 12	Timor-Leste	W	126–21	OCBC Arena Hall 1, Kallang, Singapore	SEA Games GS
June 14	Thailand	W	80–75	OCBC Arena Hall 1, Kallang, Singapore	SEA Games SF
June 15	Indonesia	W	72–64	OCBC Arena Hall 1, Kallang, Singapore	SEA Games F
August 20	Netherlands	L	62–89	Saku Suurhall Arena, Tallinn, Estonia	Toyota Four Nations Cup
August 21	Estonia	L	80–90	Saku Suurhall Arena, Tallinn, Estonia	Toyota Four Nations Cup
August 22	Iceland	L	76–86	Saku Suurhall Arena, Tallinn, Estonia	Toyota Four Nations Cup
August 30	Taiwan (Chinese Taipei)	W	77–69	Xinchuang Gymnasium, New Taipei City, Taiwan	William Jones Cup
August 31	South Korea	L	70–82	Xinchuang Gymnasium, New Taipei City, Taiwan	William Jones Cup
September 1	(Russia) Spartak Primorye	W	85–71	Xinchuang Gymnasium, New Taipei City, Taiwan	William Jones Cup
September 2	Japan	W	75–60	Xinchuang Gymnasium, New Taipei City, Taiwan	William Jones Cup
September 3	Iran	L	65–74	Xinchuang Gymnasium, New Taipei City, Taiwan	William Jones Cup
September 4	(New Zealand) Wellington Saints	W	92–88 (OT)	Xinchuang Gymnasium, New Taipei City, Taiwan	William Jones Cup
September 5	(United States) USA Overtake-Select	W	78–74	Xinchuang Gymnasium, New Taipei City, Taiwan	William Jones Cup
September 6	Republic of China B (Chinese Taipei)	W	96–67	Xinchuang Gymnasium, New Taipei City, Taiwan	William Jones Cup
September 11	(Philippines) Talk 'N Text	W	93–77	Smart Araneta Coliseum, Quezon City, Philippines	MVP Cup
September 12	(New Zealand) Wellington Saints	W	84–81	Smart Araneta Coliseum, Quezon City, Philippines	MVP Cup
September 13	Chinese Taipei	W	90–77	Smart Araneta Coliseum, Quezon City, Philippines	MVP Cup
September 23	Palestine	L	73–75	Changsha SWC Gymnasium, Changsha, China	FIBA Asia Championship R1
September 24	Hong Kong	W	101–50	Changsha SWC Gymnasium, Changsha, China	FIBA Asia Championship R1
September 25	Kuwait	W	110–64	Changsha SWC Gymnasium, Changsha, China	FIBA Asia Championship R1
September 27	Japan	W	73–66	Changsha SWC Gymnasium, Changsha, China	FIBA Asia Championship R2
September 28	Iran	W	87–73	Changsha SWC Gymnasium, Changsha, China	FIBA Asia Championship R2
September 29	India	W	99–65	Changsha SWC Gymnasium, Changsha, China	FIBA Asia Championship R2
October 1	Lebanon	W	82–70	Changsha SWC Gymnasium, Changsha, China	FIBA Asia Championship QF
October 2	Japan	W	81–70	Changsha SWC Gymnasium, Changsha, China	FIBA Asia Championship SF
October 3	China	L	67–78	Changsha SWC Gymnasium, Changsha, China	FIBA Asia Championship F

== 2014 ==
Date	Opponent	Result	Score	Venue	Competition
July 12	Chinese Taipei	W	78–64	Wuhan Sports Center Gymnasium, Wuhan, China	FIBA Asia Cup GS
July 14	Singapore	W	74–57	Wuhan Sports Center Gymnasium, Wuhan, China	FIBA Asia Cup GS
July 15	Jordan	W	71–70	Wuhan Sports Center Gymnasium, Wuhan, China	FIBA Asia Cup GS
July 17	India	W	70–66	Wuhan Sports Center Gymnasium, Wuhan, China	FIBA Asia Cup QF
July 18	Iran	L	55–76	Wuhan Sports Center Gymnasium, Wuhan, China	FIBA Asia Cup SF
July 19	China	W	80–79	Wuhan Sports Center Gymnasium, Wuhan, China	FIBA Asia Cup 3rd place
August 2	(United States) Miami Pro-Am Selection	W	95–74	Miami, United States	Exhibition game
August 3	(United States) Elev8 Sports Institute	W	93–84	Miami, United States	Exhibition game
August 10	(Spain) Liga ACB Selection	W	89–59	Vitoria-Gasteiz, Spain	Exhibition game
August 15	France	L	68–75	Azur Arena, Antibes, France	Antibes International
August 16	Australia	L	75–97	Azur Arena, Antibes, France	Antibes International
August 17	Ukraine	L	64–114	Azur Arena, Antibes, France	Antibes International
August 19	(Basque Country (autonomous community)) Basque Country	L	66–75	Polideportivo Municipal José Antonio Gasca, San Sebastián, Spain	Exhibition game
August 21	Angola	L	74–83	San Sebastián, Spain	Exhibition game
August 24	Egypt	W	74–65	Palacio Multiusos, Guadalajara, Spain	Exhibition game
August 26	Dominican Republic	L	79–86	Palacio Multiusos, Guadalajara, Spain	Exhibition game
August 30	Croatia	L	78–81 (OT)	Palacio Municipal de Deportes San Pablo, Seville, Spain	FIBA World Cup GS
August 31	Greece	L	70–82	Palacio Municipal de Deportes San Pablo, Seville, Spain	FIBA World Cup GS
September 1	Argentina	L	81–85	Palacio Municipal de Deportes San Pablo, Seville, Spain	FIBA World Cup GS
September 3	Puerto Rico	L	73–77	Palacio Municipal de Deportes San Pablo, Seville, Spain	FIBA World Cup GS
September 4	Senegal	W	81–79 (OT)	Palacio Municipal de Deportes San Pablo, Seville, Spain	FIBA World Cup GS
September 23	India	W	85–76	Hwaseong Indoor Arena, Hwaseong, South Korea	Asian Games GS
September 25	Iran	L	63–68	Hwaseong Indoor Arena, Hwaseong, South Korea	Asian Games GS
September 26	Qatar	L	68–77	Hwaseong Indoor Arena, Hwaseong, South Korea	Asian Games QFR
September 27	South Korea	L	95–97	Hwaseong Indoor Arena, Hwaseong, South Korea	Asian Games QFR
September 28	Kazakhstan	W	67–65	Hwaseong Indoor Arena, Hwaseong, South Korea	Asian Games QFR
September 29	China	L	71–78	Hwaseong Indoor Arena, Hwaseong, South Korea	Asian Games 5th–8th place
October 1	Mongolia	W	84–68	Hwaseong Indoor Arena, Hwaseong, South Korea	Asian Games 7th place

== 2013 ==
Date	Opponent	Result	Score	Venue	Competition
January 11	(Lebanon) Al Mouttahed Tripoli	W	79–77	Al Ahli Club, Dubai, United Arab Emirates	Dubai Invitational
January 12	(United Arab Emirates) Al Ahli	L	82–97	Al Ahli Club, Dubai, United Arab Emirates	Dubai Invitational
January 13	(Jordan) Aramex	L	65–75	Al Ahli Club, Dubai, United Arab Emirates	Dubai Invitational
January 16	(Lebanon) Sagesse	L	65–95	Al Ahli Club, Dubai, United Arab Emirates	Dubai Invitational QF
January 22	Indonesia	W	110–78	Queen Elizabeth Stadium, Wan Chai, Hong Kong	Super Kung Sheung Cup
January 23	Hong Kong	W	85–58	Queen Elizabeth Stadium, Wan Chai, Hong Kong	Super Kung Sheung Cup
January 24	Malaysia	W	119–46	Queen Elizabeth Stadium, Wan Chai, Hong Kong	Super Kung Sheung Cup
January 26	(China) Changsha Park Lane	W	90–69	Queen Elizabeth Stadium, Wan Chai, Hong Kong	Super Kung Sheung Cup
January 27	(United States) Southern California Fukkienese Association	W	81–77	Queen Elizabeth Stadium, Wan Chai, Hong Kong	Super Kung Sheung Cup F
May 6	(China) Shanghai Sharks	W	80–72	Mall of Asia Arena, Pasay, Philippines	Exhibition game
July 12	(New Zealand) Hawke's Bay Hawks	W	82–78	Hastings Sports Centre, Napier, New Zealand	Exhibition game
July 13	(New Zealand) Hawke's Bay Hawks	W	73–70	Hastings Sports Centre, Napier, New Zealand	Exhibition game
July 14	New Zealand NBL Selection	L	85–86	Pettigrew Green Arena, Napier, New Zealand	Exhibition game
July 16	(New Zealand) Wellington Saints	L	96–100	Te Rauparaha Arena, Porirua, New Zealand	Exhibition game
July 17	(New Zealand) Super City Rangers	W	95–75	St. Kentigerns School Gym, Auckland, New Zealand	Exhibition game
July 18	New Zealand	L	76–77	New Zealand	Exhibition game
July 26	Kazakhstan	W	92–89	Smart Araneta Coliseum, Quezon City, Philippines	Exhibition game
August 1	Saudi Arabia	W	78–66	Mall of Asia Arena, Pasay, Philippines	FIBA Asia Championship R1
August 2	Jordan	W	77–71	Mall of Asia Arena, Pasay, Philippines	FIBA Asia Championship R1
August 3	Chinese Taipei	L	79–84	Mall of Asia Arena, Pasay, Philippines	FIBA Asia Championship R1
August 5	Japan	W	90–71	Mall of Asia Arena, Pasay, Philippines	FIBA Asia Championship R2
August 6	Qatar	W	80–70	Mall of Asia Arena, Pasay, Philippines	FIBA Asia Championship R2
August 7	Hong Kong	W	67–55	Mall of Asia Arena, Pasay, Philippines	FIBA Asia Championship R2
August 9	Kazakhstan	W	88–58	Mall of Asia Arena, Pasay, Philippines	FIBA Asia Championship QF
August 10	South Korea	W	86–79	Mall of Asia Arena, Pasay, Philippines	FIBA Asia Championship SF
August 11	Iran	L	71–85	Mall of Asia Arena, Pasay, Philippines	FIBA Asia Championship F
December 9	Singapore	W	88–75	Zayar Thiri Indoor Stadium, Naypyidaw, Myanmar	SEA Games
December 10	Cambodia	W	107–57	Zayar Thiri Indoor Stadium, Naypyidaw, Myanmar	SEA Games
December 12	Myanmar	W	118–43	Zayar Thiri Indoor Stadium, Naypyidaw, Myanmar	SEA Games
December 13	Thailand	W	100–68	Zayar Thiri Indoor Stadium, Naypyidaw, Myanmar	SEA Games
December 14	Indonesia	W	83–52	Zayar Thiri Indoor Stadium, Naypyidaw, Myanmar	SEA Games
December 15	Malaysia	W	84–56	Zayar Thiri Indoor Stadium, Naypyidaw, Myanmar	SEA Games
