= Basketball at the 2023 SEA Games – Men's tournament =

Men's basketball tournament at the 2023 SEA Games
- Venue: Morodok Techo Indoor Sports Center, Phnom Penh
- Dates: 9–16 May 2023
- Nations: 8

Medalists
gold medal	Philippines
silver medal	Cambodia
bronze medal	Thailand

The men's basketball tournament at the 2023 SEA Games will be held at the Morodok Techo Indoor Sports Center in Phnom Penh, Cambodia from 9 to 16 May 2023.

== Competition schedule ==
The following is the competition schedule for the men's basketball competitions:

P	Preliminaries	CM	Classification	½	Semifinals	B	3rd place play-off	F	Final

Tue 9	Wed 10	Thu 11	Fri 12	Sat 13	Sun 14	Mon 15	Tue 16		
P	P	P	P	P	P	½	CM	B	F

== Participating nations ==
- Cambodia
- Indonesia
- Laos
- Malaysia
- Philippines
- Singapore
- Thailand
- Vietnam

== Competition format ==
- The preliminary round was composed of two groups of four teams each. Each team played the teams within their group. The top two teams per group advanced to the knockout round. The other teams qualified to the classification round.
- Classification round:
  - 5th place: Third place teams played for fifth place.
  - 7th place: Fourth place teams played for seventh place.
- The knockout round was a single-elimination tournament, with a bronze medal match for the semi-finals losers. The losing team in the final was awarded the silver medal, while the winning team was awarded the gold medal.

== Venue ==
The regular 5-on-5 basketball tournament was held at the Morodok Techo Indoor Sports Center in Phnom Penh.

== Results ==
All times are Cambodia Standard Time (UTC+7)

=== Preliminary round ===
==== Group A ====
Pos	Team	Pld	W	L	PF	PA	PD	Pts	Qualification
1	Cambodia (H)	3	3	0	268	218	+50	6	Advance to knockout round
2	Philippines	3	2	1	267	173	+94	5	Advance to knockout round
3	Malaysia	3	1	2	232	268	−36	4	Qualification to 5th place match
4	Singapore	3	0	3	175	283	−108	3	Qualification to 7th place match

Source: iGames - Cambodia 2023
Rules for classification: (1) Tournament points, (2) Head-to-head tournament points, (3) Head-to-head goal average, (4) Overall goal average, (5) Drawing of lots
(H) Hosts

9 May 2023
13:00

Box score

Philippines	94–49	Malaysia
Scoring by quarter: 33–12, 25–10, 26–16, 10–11
Pts: Ganuelas-Rosser 15; Rebs: Philips 15; Asts: 3 players 3		Pts: Wong 15; Rebs: Wong 7 Asts: Heng, Ooi 2

Morodok Techo National Sports Center, Phnom Penh
Attendance: 100
Referees: Yuen Chun Yip (HKG), Rakesh Ramalingaiah (IND), Rendy Putra Dwiantino (INA)

9 May 2023
17:00

Box score

Singapore	60–85	Cambodia
Scoring by quarter: 5–23, 20–19, 13–18, 22–25
Pts: Mah 15; Rebs: K. Lim 8 Asts: Ng S. 2		Pts: Lopes 19; Rebs: Hoeup 9 Asts: Pridgett 5

Morodok Techo National Sports Center, Phnom Penh
Attendance: 100
Referees: Lee Seung-mu (KOR), Chang Lu-yueh (TPE), Danusorn Laosaksam (THA)

11 May 2023
13:00

Box score

Malaysia	93–70	Singapore
Scoring by quarter: 20–22, 25–18, 30–8, 18–22
Pts: Wong 30; Rebs: A. Liew 5 Asts: Ong 6		Pts: Mah 15; Rebs: Ng S. 10; Asts: Ng X. 4

Morodok Techo National Sports Center, Phnom Penh
Attendance: 100
Referees: Yuen Chun Yip (HKG), Chang Lu-yueh (TPE), Danusorn Laosaksam (THA)

11 May 2023
17:00

Box score

Philippines	68–79	Cambodia
Scoring by quarter: 14–26, 17–21, 16–19, 21–13
Pts: Standhardinger 14; Rebs: Standhardinger 11; Asts: Standhardinger 4		Pts: Dorsey 22; Rebs: Lopes 10; Asts: Dorsey 7

Morodok Techo National Sports Center, Phnom Penh
Attendance: 100
Referees: Tomohiro Hosoda (JPN), Lee Seung-mu (KOR), Rendy Putra Dwiantino (IND)

13 May 2023
13:00

Box score

Singapore	45–105	Philippines
Scoring by quarter: 5–29, 14–27, 15–30, 11–19
Pts: Ng S. 10; Rebs: Ng J. 5 Asts: K. Lim 3		Pts: Lassiter 16; Rebs: Perez 11; Asts: Brownlee 8

Morodok Techo National Sports Center, Phnom Penh
Attendance: 100
Referees: Lee Seung-mu (KOR), Imran Ali Baig (IND), Trieu Chi Thanh (VIE)

13 May 2023
17:00

Box score

Cambodia	104–90	Malaysia
Scoring by quarter: 26–8, 30–27, 23–29, 25–26
Pts: Morgan 20; Rebs: Pridgett 9 Asts: Pridgett 7		Pts: Wong 24; Rebs: Wong 11; Asts: Ong 3

Morodok Techo National Sports Center, Phnom Penh
Attendance: 100
Referees: Yuen Chun Yip (HKG), Tomohiro Hosoda (JPN), Rendy Putra Dwiantino (INA)

==== Group B ====
Pos	Team	Pld	W	L	PF	PA	PD	Pts	Qualification
1	Indonesia	3	3	0	316	188	+128	6	Advance to knockout round
2	Thailand	3	2	1	329	192	+137	5	Advance to knockout round
3	Vietnam	3	1	2	244	244	0	4	Qualification to 5th place match
4	Laos	3	0	3	131	396	−265	3	Qualification to 7th place match

Source: iGames - Cambodia 2023
Rules for classification: (1) Tournament points, (2) Head-to-head tournament points, (3) Head-to-head goal average, (4) Overall goal average, (5) Drawing of lots

10 May 2023
13:00

Box score

Indonesia	141–37	Laos
Scoring by quarter: 35–7, 37–9, 36–8, 33–13
Pts: Prastawa 21; Rebs: Prosper 7 Asts: Teja 10		Pts: Labouaphieng 10; Rebs: three players 5 Asts: Lothalath 3

Morodok Techo National Sports Center, Phnom Penh
Attendance: 100
Referees: Joenard Carcia (PHI), Imran Ali Baig (IND), Trieu Chi Thanh (VIE)

10 May 2023
17:00

Box score

Thailand	104–63	Vietnam
Scoring by quarter: 28–15, 23–10, 26–26, 27–12
Pts: M. Morgan 19; Rebs: Holder 9 Asts: J. Morgan 5		Pts: Dinh 15; Rebs: Nguyễn H.P.V. 10; Asts: Dinh 5

Morodok Techo National Sports Center, Phnom Penh
Attendance: 100
Referees: Chan Owe Shiong (MAS), Tomohiro Hosoda (JPN), Neo Kai Chong (SGP)

12 May 2023
11:00

Box score

Laos	42–156	Thailand
Scoring by quarter: 7–53, 17–33, 4–29, 14–41
Pts: Labouaphieng 11; Rebs: Labouaphieng, Lothalath 4 Asts: Duangdeuane, Lothalath 2		Pts: J. Morgan 26; Rebs: Breunig 9 Asts: Breunig 6

Morodok Techo National Sports Center, Phnom Penh
Attendance: 100
Referees: Leong Chuen Wing (SGP), John Lester Celeste (PHI), Neo Kai Chong (SGP)

12 May 2023
17:00

Box score

Vietnam	82–88	Indonesia
Scoring by quarter: 24–16, 17–28, 18–15, 23–29
Pts: Dinh 18; Rebs: Cilia 6 Asts: Nguyễn M.T. 6		Pts: Prastawa 27; Rebs: Prosper 7 Asts: Beane Jr. 4

Morodok Techo National Sports Center, Phnom Penh
Attendance: 100
Referees: Chan Owe Shiong (MAS), Lee Seung-mu (KOR), Tomohiro Hosoda (JPN)

14 May 2023
13:00

Box score

Vietnam	99–52	Laos
Scoring by quarter: 33–11, 16–16, 28–13, 22–12
Pts: Nguyễn V.H. 16; Rebs: Nguyễn V.H. 14; Asts: Dư 4		Pts: Lothalath 20; Rebs: Khamvongsa 7 Asts: Duangdeuane, Phonphakdy 3

Morodok Techo National Sports Center, Phnom Penh
Attendance: 100
Referees: Chan Owe Shiong (MAS), Joenard Garcia (PHI), Neo Kai Chong (SGP)

14 May 2023
17:00

Box Score

Indonesia	87–69	Thailand
Scoring by quarter: 12–22, 15–16, 27–15, 33–16
Pts: Prosper 20; Rebs: Beane Jr. 8 Asts: Teja 6		Pts: Holder 18; Rebs: Breunig 7 Asts: three players 3

Morodok Techo National Sports Center, Phnom Penh
Attendance: 100
Referees: Yuen Chun Yip (HKG), Lee Seung-mu (KOR), Chang Lu-Yueh (TPE)

=== Classification round ===
==== 7th place match ====
16 May 2023
09:00

Box score

Singapore	84–49	Laos
Scoring by quarter: 31–11, 22–11, 14–10, 17–17
Pts: Ng X. 20; Rebs: Ng S. 7 Asts: four players 4		Pts: Lothalath 11; Rebs: Lothalath 7 Asts: four players 2

Morodok Techo National Sports Center, Phnom Penh
Attendance: 100
Referees: Chan Owe Shiong (MAS), Imran Ali Baig (IND), John Lester Celeste (PHI)

==== 5th place match ====
16 May 2023
11:00

Box score

Malaysia	94–83	Vietnam
Scoring by quarter: 31–23, 24–26, 20–14, 19–20
Pts: Wong 25; Rebs: Lee, Ting 7 Asts: Heng 7		Pts: Dinh 22; Rebs: Nguyễn M.T. 9 Asts: Nguyễn M.T. 6

Morodok Techo National Sports Center, Phnom Penh
Attendance: 100
Referees: Joenard Garcia (PHI), Rendy Putra Dwiantino (INA), Danusorn Laosaksam (THA)

=== Knockout round ===
Semi-finals
15 May
Cambodia	76
Thailand	66
15 May
Indonesia	76
Philippines	84

Gold medal match
16 May
Cambodia	69
Philippines	80
Bronze medal match
16 May
Thailand	83
Indonesia	69

==== Semi-finals ====
15 May 2023
15:00

Box score

Cambodia	76–66	Thailand
Scoring by quarter: 25–21, 15–14, 19–13, 17–18
Pts: Peterson 24; Rebs: D. Morgan 13; Asts: D. Morgan, Pridgett 4		Pts: three players 17; Rebs: Breunig 13; Asts: Holder 4

Morodok Techo National Sports Center, Phnom Penh
Attendance: 1200
Referees: Leong Chuen Wing (SGP), Chang Lu-Yueh (TPE), Yuen Chun Yip (HKG)

15 May 2023
17:00

Box score

Indonesia	76–84	Philippines
Scoring by quarter: 24–20, 21–18, 20–22, 11–24
Pts: Prosper 26; Rebs: Prosper 9 Asts: Beane 6		Pts: Brownlee 34; Rebs: Brownlee 9 Asts: Brownlee 5

Morodok Techo National Sports Center, Phnom Penh
Attendance: 100
Referees: Tomohiro Hosoda (JPN), Lee Seung-mu (KOR), Chan Owe Shiong (MAS)

==== Bronze medal match ====
16 May 2023
13:00

Box score

Thailand	83–69	Indonesia
Scoring by quarter: 21–14, 14–10, 25–17, 23–28
Pts: Breunig 21; Rebs: Breunig, M. Morgan 8 Asts: Muangboon 5		Pts: Diagne 14; Rebs: three players 5 Asts: Teja 6

Morodok Techo National Sports Center, Phnom Penh
Attendance: 100
Referees: Tomohiro Hosoda (JPN), Yuen Chun Yip (HKG), Rakesh Ramalingaiah (IND)

==== Gold medal match ====
16 May 2023
15:00

Box score

Cambodia	69–80	Philippines
Scoring by quarter: 22–21, 11–23, 18–20, 18–16
Pts: Peterson 18; Rebs: Peterson 14; Asts: Pridgett 5		Pts: Brownlee 23; Rebs: Brownlee, Standhardinger 7 Asts: Brownlee, Newsome 4

Morodok Techo National Sports Center, Phnom Penh
Attendance: 1800
Referees: Lee Seung-mu (KOR), Leong Chuen Wing (SGP), Chang Lu-Yueh (TPE)

== Final standings ==
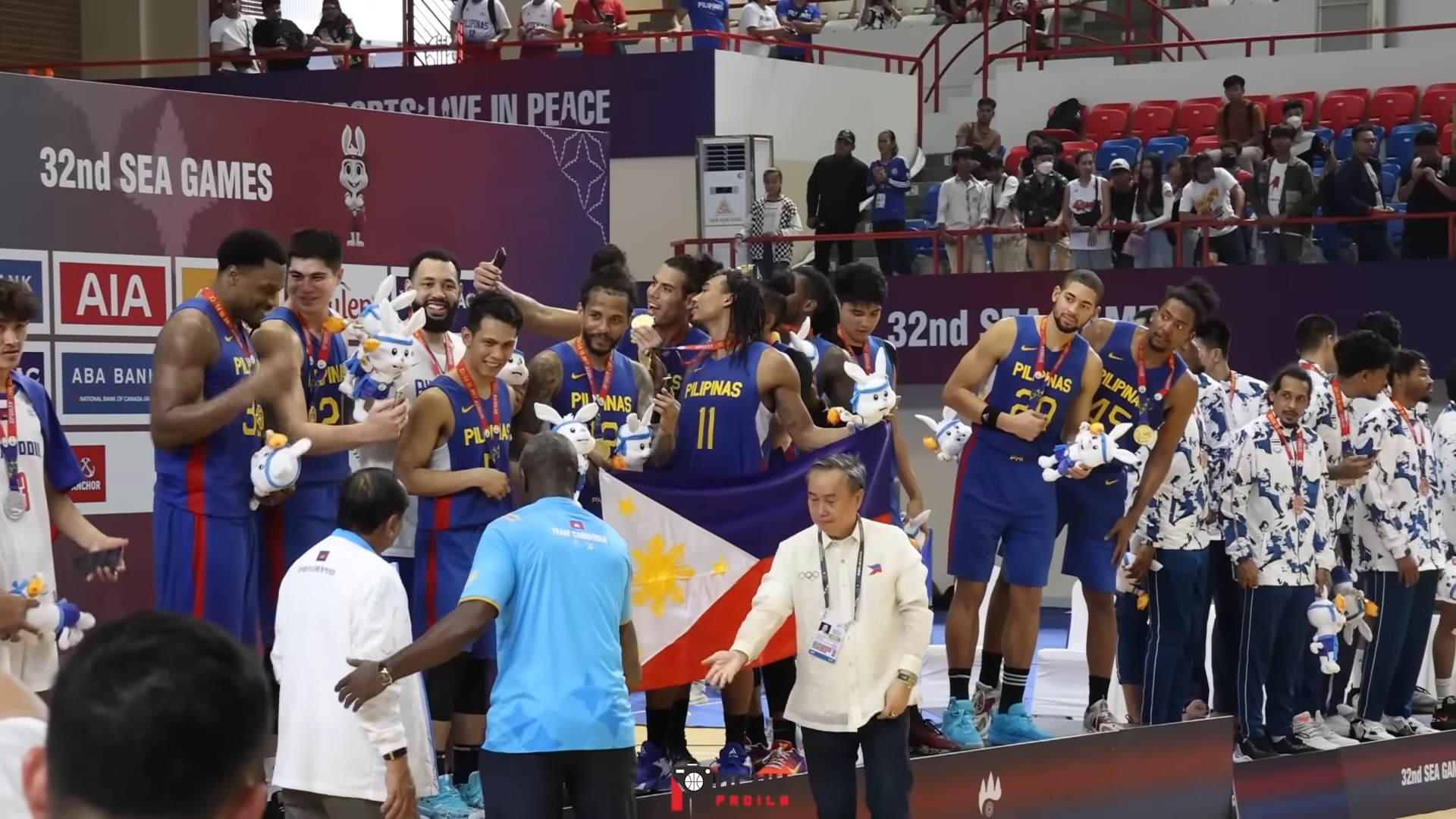
Awarding ceremony.

Rank	Team
1st place, gold medalist(s)	Philippines
2nd place, silver medalist(s)	Cambodia
3rd place, bronze medalist(s)	Thailand
4	Indonesia
5	Malaysia
6	Vietnam
7	Singapore
8	Laos

== See also ==
- Women's tournament
