= Basketball at the 2023 SEA Games – Women's tournament =

Women's 5x5 basketball tournament for the 2023 SEA Games

Women's basketball tournament at the 2023 SEA Games
- Venue: Morodok Techo Indoor Sports Center, Phnom Penh
- Dates: 9–15 May 2023
- Nations: 7

Medalists
gold medal	Indonesia
silver medal	Philippines
bronze medal	Malaysia

The women's basketball tournament at the 2023 SEA Games was held at the Morodok Techo Indoor Sports Center in Phnom Penh, Cambodia from 9 to 15 May 2023.

== Competition schedule ==
The following was the competition schedule for the women's basketball competitions:

RR	Round-robin

Tue 9	Wed 10	Thu 11	Fri 12	Sat 13	Sun 14	Mon 15
RR	RR	RR	RR	RR	RR	RR

== Participating nations ==
- Cambodia
- Indonesia
- Malaysia
- Philippines
- Singapore
- Thailand
- Vietnam

== Competition format ==
The seven teams competed in a single round-robin. Three highest-ranked teams were awarded gold, silver and bronze medal.

== Venue ==
The regular 5-on-5 basketball tournament was held at the Morodok Techo Indoor Sports Center in Phnom Penh.

== Results ==
=== Round-robin ===
All times are Cambodia Standard Time (UTC+7)

Pos	Team	Pld	W	L	PF	PA	PD	Pts	Final Result
1	Indonesia	6	6	0	497	349	+148	12	Gold medal
2	Philippines	6	5	1	551	397	+154	11	Silver medal
3	Malaysia	6	4	2	442	422	+20	10	Bronze medal
4	Vietnam	6	3	3	430	463	−33	9	
5	Thailand	6	2	4	445	398	+47	8	
6	Cambodia (H)	6	1	5	450	578	−128	7	
7	Singapore	6	0	6	285	493	−208	6	

Source: iGames - Cambodia 2023
Rules for classification: (1) Tournament points, (2) Head-to-head tournament points, (3) Head-to-head goal average, (4) Overall goal average, (5) Drawing of lots
(H) Hosts

9 May 2023
09:00

Box Score

Indonesia	67–62	Vietnam
Scoring by quarter: 15–12, 16–16, 21–25, 15–9
Pts: Pierre-Louis 19; Rebs: Pierre-Louis 9 Asts: Wongsohardjo 7		Pts: Trương T.M. 21; Rebs: Trương T.M. 8 Asts: Trương T.M. 6

Morodok Techo Indoor Sports Center, Phnom Penh
Attendance: 100
Referees: Imran Ali Baig (IND), Lau Suk Yee (HKG), John Lester Celeste (PHI)

9 May 2023
11:00

Box Score

Singapore	26–78	Thailand
Scoring by quarter: 3–19, 8–25, 8–14, 7–20
Pts: Al. Lim 6 Rebs: Choo 8 Asts: 7 players 1		Pts: Klunbut 12; Rebs: Thuamon 6 Asts: 6 players 2

Morodok Techo Indoor Sports Center, Phnom Penh
Attendance: 100
Referees: Kim Bo-hui (KOR), Tomohiro Hosoda (JPN), Lim Sok Hoon (MAS)

9 May 2023
15:00

Box Score

Cambodia	101–107 (OT)	Malaysia
Scoring by quarter: 28–28, 27–13, 18–32, 18–18, Overtime: 10–16
Pts: Dinkins 28; Rebs: Cooks 15; Asts: Simmons 5		Pts: Yap 35; Rebs: Pang 11; Asts: Pang 9

Morodok Techo Indoor Sports Center, Phnom Penh
Attendance: 100
Referees: Leong Chuen Wing (SGP), Ami Takano (JPN), Samaneh Dehghani (IRN)

10 May 2023
09:00

Box Score

Malaysia	75–39	Singapore
Scoring by quarter: 26–7, 9–13, 16–12, 24–7
Pts: Rajintiran 16; Rebs: Rajintiran 9 Asts: Yaakob 4		Pts: Am. Lim 6 Rebs: Al. Lim 8 Asts: Al. Lim 3

Morodok Techo Indoor Sports Center, Phnom Penh
Attendance: 100
Referees: Samaneh Dehghani (IRN), Via Diah Rohmana (INA), Panwadee Suraudorn (THA)

10 May 2023
11:00

Box Score

Thailand	69–70	Indonesia
Scoring by quarter: 20–24, 10–20, 23–15, 16–11
Pts: Wongtapha 15; Rebs: Klunbut, Supyen 7 Asts: Supyen 7		Pts: Pierre-Louis 30; Rebs: Pierre-Louis 15; Asts: Whitted 5

Morodok Techo Indoor Sports Center, Phnom Penh
Attendance: 100
Referees: Ami Takano (JPN), Rakesh Ramalingaiah (IND), Pisey Khourn (CAM)

10 May 2023
15:00

Box Score

Philippines	114–54	Cambodia
Scoring by quarter: 22–20, 36–11, 32–14, 24–9
Pts: Fajardo 17; Rebs: Animam 9 Asts: Cabinbin 6		Pts: Cooks 18; Rebs: Cooks, Hanlon 9 Asts: Dinkins 7

Morodok Techo Indoor Sports Center, Phnom Penh
Attendance: 100
Referees: Yuen Chun Yip (HKG), Kim Bo-hui (KOR), Lee Seung-mu (KOR)

11 May 2023
09:00

Box Score

Vietnam	75–72	Thailand
Scoring by quarter: 13–17, 13–18, 26–13, 23–24
Pts: Trương T.M. 26; Rebs: 3 players 6 Asts: Trương T.M., Trương T.V. 6		Pts: Sriharaksa 17; Rebs: Thuamon 8 Asts: Rungrueang 4

Morodok Techo Indoor Sports Center, Phnom Penh
Attendance: 100
Referees: Imran Ali Baig (IND), Ami Takano (JPN), Leong Chuen Wing (SGP)

11 May 2023
11:00

Box Score

Indonesia	85–57	Malaysia
Scoring by quarter: 23–18, 26–12, 15–15, 21–12
Pts: Pierre-Louis 18; Rebs: Pierre-Louis 7 Asts: Orville 4		Pts: Pang, Tan 11; Rebs: Saw 7 Asts: Saw 8

Morodok Techo Indoor Sports Center, Phnom Penh
Attendance: 100
Referees: Kim Bo-hui (KOR), Lau Suk Yee (HKG), Pisey Khourn (CAM)

11 May 2023
15:00

Box Score

Singapore	63–94	Philippines
Scoring by quarter: 14–25, 24–20, 5–22, 20–27
Pts: Am. Lim 18; Rebs: Al. Lim 6 Asts: See 7		Pts: Castillo 14; Rebs: Surada 12; Asts: Fajardo, Tongco 4

Morodok Techo Indoor Sports Center, Phnom Penh
Attendance: 100
Referees: Rakesh Ramalingaiah (IND), Lim Sok Hoon (MAS), Via Diah Rohmana (INA)

12 May 2023
09:00

Box Score

Malaysia	76–72	Vietnam
Scoring by quarter: 14–11, 17–16, 21–21, 24–24
Pts: Rajintiran 22; Rebs: Rajintiran 12; Asts: Yap 8		Pts: Trương T.M. 18; Rebs: Trương T.M. 9 Asts: Trương T.M. 6

Morodok Techo Indoor Sports Center, Phnom Penh
Attendance: 100
Referees: Ami Takano (JPN), Joenard Garcia (PHI), Rendy Putra Dwiantino (INA)

12 May 2023
13:00

Box Score

Philippines	68–89	Indonesia
Scoring by quarter: 24–18, 13–17, 12–28, 19–26
Pts: Pontejos 11; Rebs: Animam 9 Asts: Berberabe 3		Pts: Anggraeni 24; Rebs: Pierre-Louis 15; Asts: Retong 8

Morodok Techo Indoor Sports Center, Phnom Penh
Attendance: 100
Referees: Kim Bo-hui (KOR), Trieu Chi Thanh (VIE), Lim Sok Hoon (MAS)

12 May 2023
15:00

Box Score

Cambodia	83–63	Singapore
Scoring by quarter: 19–10, 16–21, 23–18, 25–14
Pts: Cooks 18; Rebs: Cooks 13; Asts: Hanlon 8		Pts: Am. Lim 21; Rebs: Al. Lim 11; Asts: Ong 5

Morodok Techo Indoor Sports Center, Phnom Penh
Attendance: 100
Referees: Chang Lu-Yeuh (TPE), Samaneh Dehgani (IRN), Lau Suk Yee (HKG)

13 May 2023
09:00

Box Score

Thailand	48–64	Malaysia
Scoring by quarter: 10–17, 8–17, 13–12, 17–18
Pts: Wongtapha, Udomsuk 12; Rebs: Thuamon 5 Asts: Prajuapsook 2		Pts: Pang 13; Rebs: Saw 9 Asts: Saw 6

Morodok Techo Indoor Sports Center, Phnom Penh
Attendance: 100
Referees: Kim Bo-hui (KOR), Samaneh Dehgani (IRN), Via Diah Rohmana (INA)

13 May 2023
11:00

Box Score

Vietnam	58–116	Philippines
Scoring by quarter: 25–35, 9–33, 10–27, 14–21
Pts: Trương T.V. 15; Rebs: Jones 4 Asts: Trương T.V., Vo 2		Pts: Castillo 22; Rebs: Animam 13; Asts: Animam 4

Morodok Techo Indoor Sports Center, Phnom Penh
Attendance: 100
Referees: Rakesh Ramalingaiah (IND), Danusorn Laosaksam (THA), Pisey Khourn (CAM)

13 May 2023
15:00

Box Score

Indonesia	100–54	Cambodia
Scoring by quarter: 25–11, 23–10, 23–18, 29–15
Pts: Peyton, Pierre-Louis 16; Rebs: Pierre-Louis 11; Asts: Sutjiono 5		Pts: Dinkins 19; Rebs: Cooks 14; Asts: Dinkins, Hanlon 3

Morodok Techo Indoor Sports Center, Phnom Penh
Attendance: 100
Referees: Ami Takano (JPN), Lau Suk Yee (HKG), Panwadee Suraudorn (THA)

14 May 2023
09:00

Box Score

Singapore	39–86	Indonesia
Scoring by quarter: 7–26, 7–17, 8–20, 17–23
Pts: See 11; Rebs: Choo, Al. Lim 7 Asts: See 4		Pts: Lestari 15; Rebs: Kusuma 10; Asts: 4 players 4

Morodok Techo Indoor Sports Center, Phnom Penh
Attendance: 100
Referees: Lau Suk Yee (HKG), Pisey Khoum (CAM), Panwadee Suraudorn (THA)

14 May 2023
11:00

Box Score

Philippines	82–70	Thailand
Scoring by quarter: 19–13, 27–25, 18–15, 18–17
Pts: Bernardino 18; Rebs: Surada 11; Asts: Bernardino 4		Pts: Udomsuk 22; Rebs: Thuamon, Udomsuk 7 Asts: Supyen, Wongtapha 3

Morodok Techo Indoor Sports Center, Phnom Penh
Attendance: 100
Referees: Ami Takano (JPN), Kim Bo-hui (KOR), Rakesh Ramalingaiah (IND)

14 May 2023
15:00

Box Score

Cambodia	77–86	Vietnam
Scoring by quarter: 27–23, 19–21, 16–25, 15–17
Pts: Dinkins 33; Rebs: Cooks 22; Asts: Simmons, Dinkins 5		Pts: Nguyễn T.T.D. 24; Rebs: Trương T.M. 10; Asts: Trương T.M. 8

Morodok Techo Indoor Sports Center, Phnom Penh
Attendance: 100
Referees: Lim Sok Hoon (MAS), Samaneh Dehghani (IRN), John Lester Celeste (PHI)

15 May 2023
09:00

Box Score

Vietnam	77–55	Singapore
Scoring by quarter: 15–10, 20–14, 26–13, 16–18
Pts: Jones 20; Rebs: Nguyễn T.T.T. 9 Asts: Thu, Yen 5		Pts: Lim J.M. 13; Rebs: Al. Lim 9 Asts: See 7

Morodok Techo Indoor Sports Center, Phnom Penh
Attendance: 100
Referees: Samaneh Dehghani (IRN), Panwadee Suraudorn (THA), Pisey Khourn (CAM)

15 May 2023
11:00

Box Score

Malaysia	63–77	Philippines
Scoring by quarter: 10–21, 19–27, 19–12, 15–17
Pts: Pang 15; Rebs: Saw 8 Asts: Saw 6		Pts: Pontejos 24; Rebs: Animam 13; Asts: Cabinbin, Bernardino 4

Morodok Techo Indoor Sports Center, Phnom Penh
Attendance: 100
Referees: Kim Bo-hui (KOR), Ami Takano (JPN), Lau Suk Yee Lau (HKG)

15 May 2023
13:00

Box Score

Thailand	108–81	Cambodia
Scoring by quarter: 26–24, 30–17, 30–15, 22–25
Pts: Udomsuk 23; Rebs: Udomsuk 11; Asts: Thuamon 9		Pts: Cooks 28; Rebs: Cooks 10; Asts: Dinkins 4

Morodok Techo Indoor Sports Center, Phnom Penh
Attendance: 100
Referees: Lim Sook Hoon (MAS), Via Diah Rohmana (INA), Trieu Chi Thanh (VIE)

== Final standings ==
Rank	Team
1st place, gold medalist(s)	Indonesia
2nd place, silver medalist(s)	Philippines
3rd place, bronze medalist(s)	Malaysia
4	Vietnam
5	Thailand
6	Cambodia
7	Singapore

== See also ==
- Men's tournament
