= Siphandone (name) =

Siphandone (Lao: ສີພັນດອນ) can be both a surname and a given name. Notable people with this name include:

- Siphandone Lothalath (born 1993), Laotian basketball player
- Khamtai Siphandone (1924–2025), Laotian politician
- Sonexay Siphandone (born 1966), Laotian politician
- Viengthong Siphandone, Laotian politician
