= Toronto (3x3 team) =

- Leagues: FIBA 3x3
- Founded: 2018
- History: Toronto (2018–2019); Toronto Hyundai (2019–2020); Toronto (2020–present)
- Location: Toronto, Ontario
- Team manager: John Wiggins
- Championships: 1 3x3PLN: (2023); 2 3x3CNQ: (2018, 2019)

Toronto is a Canadian men's professional 3x3 basketball club based in Toronto, Ontario. The team competes in FIBA 3x3 tournaments and has played in the FIBA 3x3 World Tour.

== History ==
In July 2018, Toronto (featuring Alex "Superman" Johnson, Shaquille Keith, Tramar Sutherland, and Marlo Davis) defeated Winnipeg to win the 2018 3x3 Canada Quest National Final.

== Players ==
=== Current roster ===
Toronto roster
Players
Coaches

Pos.	No.	Nat.	Name	Ht.	Wt.	Age
G	1	(Canada)	Johnson, Alex (C)	1.78 m (5 ft 10 in)	79 kg (174 lb)	38 – 18 January 1988
G	2	(Canada)	Ogundokun, Dele	1.91 m (6 ft 3 in)
F	3	(Canada)	Paige, Adam	2.02 m (6 ft 8 in)
F	4	(Canada)	Kelvin, Michael	2.02 m (6 ft 8 in)
F	6	(Canada)	Gill, Bikramjit	2.02 m (6 ft 8 in)
F		(Canada)	Jensen-Whyte, Jordan (R)	1.98 m (6 ft 6 in)
F	33	(Bosnia and Herzegovina) (Canada)	Mitrović, Nemanja (R)	1.98 m (6 ft 6 in)	91 kg (201 lb)	35 – 27 July 1990
G	9	(Canada)	Sutherland, Tramar (R)	1.91 m (6 ft 3 in)	91 kg (201 lb)	36 – 23 March 1989

Head coach

- Vacant

Legend

- (C) Team captain
- (R) Reserve
- Injured

- Roster
Updated: October 17, 2025

== Season by season ==
Season	Tournament	Final	FR	Ref.
2018	3x3 Canada Quest – National Finals	Winner	5–1	
2019	3x3 Canada Quest – East Final	Winner	5–1	
2019	FIBA 3x3 World Tour – Montreal	12th place	0–2	
2023	3x3 PRO League Netherlands Winter Edition – Stop 1	5th place	1–3	
2023	3x3 PRO League Netherlands Winter Edition – Stop 2	Runner-up	4–1	
2023	3x3 PRO League Netherlands Winter Edition – Stop 3	Runner-up	4–1	
2023	3x3 PRO League Netherlands Winter Edition – Finals	Winner	5–0	
2023	FIBA 3x3 Super Quest – Lausanne	4th place	3–1	
2023	Drive 3x3 – The NYC Big Apple Classic	10th place	0–2	
2023	FIBA 3x3 Challenger – Deqing Huzhou	4th place	2–2	
2023	FIBA 3x3 Challenger – Clermont-Ferrand	13th place	1–1	
2023	FIBA 3x3 Challenger – Mayor's Ulaanbaatar	6th place	1–2	
2023	FIBA 3x3 Challenger – Poitiers	4th place	2–2	
2023	FIBA 3x3 World Tour – Macau	7th place	1–2	
2023	Drive 3x3 – The Vegas Sin City Classic	9th place	0–3	
2023	FIBA 3x3 World Tour – Edmonton	11th place	0–2	
2023	FIBA 3x3 Challenger – Yichang	4th place	3–1	
2023	FIBA 3x3 Challenger – Québec	12th place	0–2	
2023	FIBA 3x3 Challenger – Suntory Shanghai	12th place	0–2	
2023	Mein EinkaufsBahnhof 3x3 Germany Tour – Final	3rd place	4–1	
2023	FIBA 3x3 Challenger – Colorado	6th place	2–1	
2024	FIBA 3x3 Super Quest – Lausanne	5th place	2–1	
2024	Wentworth District 3x3 Championship	7th place	1–1	
2024	FIBA 3x3 Challenger – Québec	11th place	2–2	
2024	RCA3x3 Invitational – Vaughan	Runner-up	4–1	
