= TBSL =

TBSL may refer to:

- The Times Group#Times Business Solutions Limited
- Thailand Basketball Super League
- Turkish Basketball Super League
