= Tramar =

Tramar is a given name. Notable people with the name include:

- Tramar Dillard, birth name of Flo Rida (born 1979), American rapper, singer, and songwriter
- Tramar Sutherland (born 1989), Canadian basketball player
