= Crvena zvezda (3x3 team) =

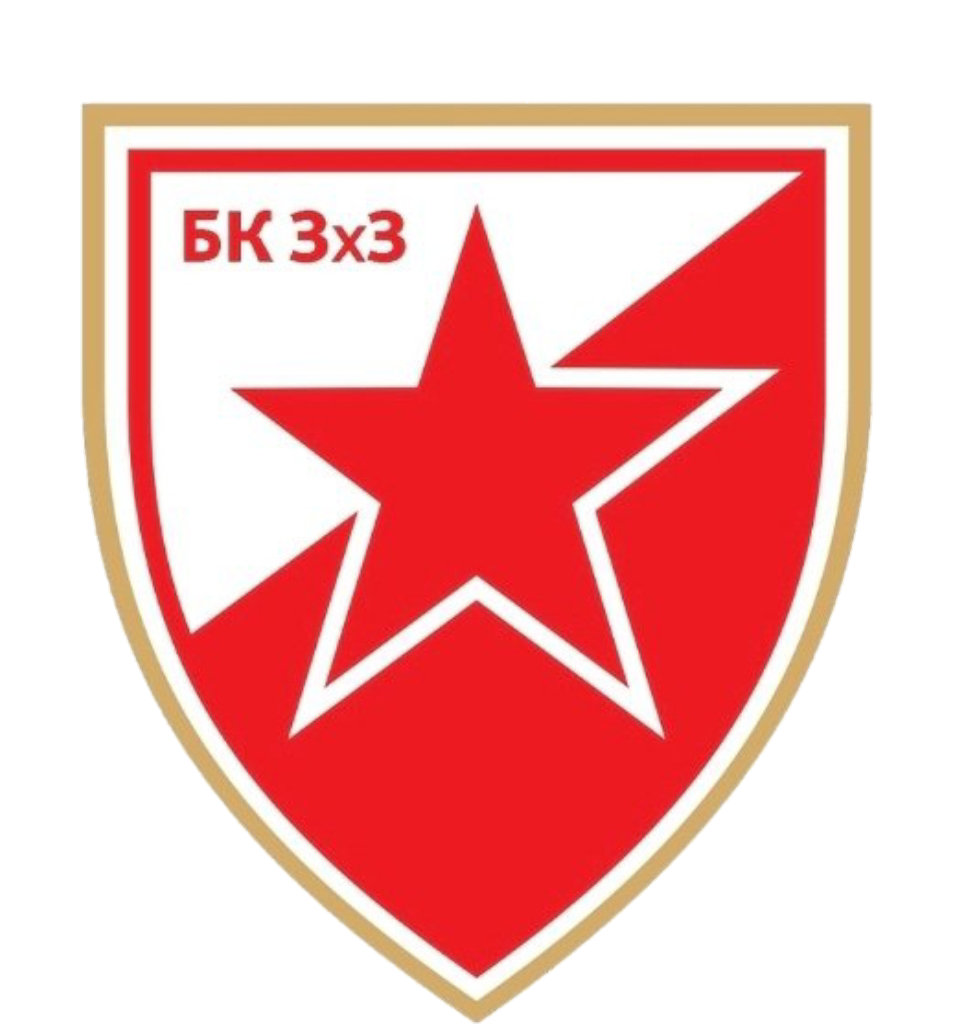
- Nickname: red and whites
- Founded: 9 January 2026; 9 months ago
- Location: Belgrade, Serbia
- Team colors: Red and White
- Head coach: Danilo Lukić

3x3 Crvena zvezda (English: Red Star 3x3 Basketball Club) is a men's professional 3x3 basketball club based in Belgrade, Serbia. It is part of the sports society SD Crvena zvezda. The highest position of this club on FIBA Team ranking was 18th place, first time achieved on 18 July 2026.

== Beginnings ==
The inaugural roster of 3x3 Crvena zvezda consisted of players that had previously won the silver medal at the 2025 FIBA 3x3 U23 World Cup for the U23 Serbian 3x3 national team. Those players were Miloš Cvrkota, Marko Đorđević, Lazar Kovačević and Vuk Vukićević. In their first–ever appearance, they won the U23 tournament, the fifth stop of the winter BG 3x3 league on 8 February 2026. In the group stage, they defeated Laćarak (22–10) and Aranđelovac (21–14). In the knockout phase, they defeated U23 ANNS (21–6), then Čuka (21–18) and in the final, U23 Partizan (21–15), thus taking first place in the competition of 12 teams. The first coach in the club's history was Danilo Lukić, the former coach of both the world champion, Ub, and the Serbia men's national 3x3 team.

== Season by season ==
As of 11 October 2026

Season	Tournaments played	Tournaments won	Wins	Defeats
2026	22	4	57	29

== 2026 Season ==
=== First senior tournaments ===
The first senior tournament they played was the senior version of the Winter BG League, whose U23 edition (V stop) they had won before. They reached the final. The first tournament played abroad was the Light Quest in Antwerp, which served as a qualifier for the Manila Challenger. There they took third place, losing to the eventual winners, Baskets Bonn. At the end of that week, they played in the VI stop of the Winter BG League. Following a pool stage loss to Zagreb Nitui, the team finished second in the pool stage, and set up a quarterfinal matchup with Liman, then the 4th team in the world on FIBA team ranking. This was Zvezda's first-ever duel against a top-tier team, which they lost 15–21.

=== Domestic title and first participation in FIBA Challengers ===
Through the performance slot, they secured participation in their first FIBA tournaments, such as the Hengqin Challenger in China, the Shibuya City Challenger in Tokyo, and the World Tour Shanghai. They advanced from the qualifying draw of the Hengqin Challenger, then won against Hangzhou in the pool stage, and finished 7th in the tournament after losing to two German teams. Marko Đorđević got injured early in the qualifying draw of the Shibuya City Challenger, and with the remaining 3 players, Zvezda lost both games later on in the pool stage, finishing the tournament 9th. Those 3 players later won the final tournament of the winter U23 BG League during the break between senior tournaments, playing for the Serbian 3x3 Academy. Zvezda's first senior tournament won was the 15th edition of 3x3 Kragujevac, which was also the second stop of the Serbian championship for the year 2026. The tournament marked the club debut of Dejan Majstorović, who replaced Vuk Vukićević. That was one of the first tournaments in which Majstorović played, following an injury sustained on World Tour in Hong Kong on 20 July 2025 and the surgery that followed in August that year.

=== International Quest domination and FIBA World Tour participations ===
The first Quest abroad followed, in Valencia, which Zvezda won with all 5 victories, including the final against the host team, who was the first seed. This ensured participation in the World Tour in Vienna. The biggest breakthrough came at World Tour Shanghai, where Zvezda finished 4th, while Vuk Vukićević won the Shootout Contest Final. Another international Quest title arrived in Arnhem, where Zvezda defeated 4 Dutch teams and qualified for the World Tour in Amsterdam. They finished World Tour Vienna in 11th place, after 2 losses in pool stage against eventual finalists, Liman, and hosts, Vienna. In the match against Liman, both teams recorded 11 fouls, and the game against Vienna was decided by 12 points from Quincy Diggs and a game-winning two-pointer by Toni Blazan, who played through an injury sustained during that game. At World Tour Amsterdam, they were eliminated in the Qualifying draw. First they lost to the eventual competition winners, Baskets Bonn, in a game in which Vuk Vukićević got injured, and Zvezda committed 12 fouls total, most of them in an early stage of the game. The remaining 3 players then lost to Bucharest and finished tournament 15th.

=== Roster expansion for new challenges ===
Injury of Vuk Vukićević and the return of Dejan Majstorović to Ub led Zvezda to add new players for the Quest in East Sarajevo. Miloš Antić and Aleksa Stojanović joined the team for that Quest after playing for Zvezda on lower ranked tournaments in Croatia that month, alongside some other players. Antić already had a lot of experience at World Tours playing for Riffa from Bahrein, and used to play for Serbian national team in youth categories. Stojanović had a title at Quest in East Sarajevo as a Liman player in 2025. Zvezda lost the final match against Utrecht, and failed to qualify for the World Tour in Lausanne. Two weeks later, Zvezda finished 5th in the Quest in Novi Sad, followed by 10th place finish at the Challenger in the same City. They won their qualification matches with big point difference, but lost both of their games in the pool stage, first one to Amsterdam after overtime, and the second one to Fuengirola, after the missed shot for overtime in the final second. Later they finished 2nd at the Pro 3x3 Tour Finals in Novalja, Croatia, and failed to obtain wild card for Mataro Challenger. It took them 2 months after the Quest in Arnhem to win another tournament. It was 3x3 Bijeljina, one of the stops of the 3x3 League of Republic of Srpska. Aleksa Stojanović was MVP of the tournament.

=== Benefits via FIBA team ranking ===
As the club continued to climb on the FIBA team ranking, it secured direct entries to four Challengers - Singapore, Beijing, Kaohsiung City and Aichi Challenger. At Singapore Challenger they finished 10th after losing both their games in the pool stage - first to Toronto after overtime, second to Shanghai that scored many 2-pointers at the late phase of the game. Shanghai eliminated Zvezda at Beijing Challenger as well, this time in the quarterfinals, leading to Zvezda’s 6th place finish, their best at FIBA Challengers up till then. The roster from the start of the season was gathered after more than 2 and a half months, at the Kaohsiung City Challenger. Zvezda finished the tournament 10th, being eliminated in the pool stage where their rivals were later finalists - Shibuya, that played in the qualifying draw, and the home team, Taipei. All 3 teams finished the pool stage with one win and one loss each, where Zvezda scored the lowest amount of points, and finished 3rd in the pool D. At Aichi Challenger, they finished 8th, being eliminated by later finalists. Shanghai. That was the 3rd case in last 4 tournaments that Shanghai eliminated Zvezda.

=== Table view ===
Senior tournaments
WINTER BG LEAGUE - Stop V - 16 February 2026 (Belgrade (Serbia) )		2nd place
Marko Đorđević - Vuk Vukićević - Miloš Cvrkota - Lazar Kovačević
Pool B	(Serbia) ANNS	21–11
Pool B	(Serbia) Bix agro 3x3	17–16
Quarterfinals	(Serbia) Aranđelovac	21–12
Semifinals	(Croatia) Cibona	18–15
Final	(Serbia) Čuka	17–21
3x3GRIT Lite Quest - 18 March 2026 (Antwerp (Belgium) )		3rd place
Marko Đorđević - Vuk Vukićević - Miloš Cvrkota - Lazar Kovačević
Pool C	(Germany) Der Stamm	21–11
Pool C	(France) Bordeaux	21–18
Quarterfinals	(France) Ermont	21–11
Semifinals	(Germany) Baskets Bonn	19–21
WINTER BG LEAGUE - Stop VI - 22 March 2026 (Belgrade (Serbia) )		8th place
Marko Đorđević - Vuk Vukićević - Miloš Cvrkota - Lazar Kovačević
Pool C	(Serbia) U23 Krupanj	19–14
Pool C	(Croatia) Zagreb Nitui	16–20
Quarterfinals	(Serbia) Liman	15–21
Hengqin Challenger - 11–12 April 2026 (Zhuhai Shi (China) )		7th place
Marko Đorđević - Vuk Vukićević - Miloš Cvrkota - Lazar Kovačević
Qualifying draw pool B	(Hong Kong) HK Central	21–9
Qualifying draw pool B	(China) Hengqin	22–8
Pool D	(China) Hangzhou	19–16
Pool D	(Germany) Baskets Bonn	13–17
Quarterfinals	(Germany) Skyliners	13–21
Shibuya City Challenger - 18–19 April 2026 (Tokyo (Japan) )		9th place
Marko Đorđević - Vuk Vukićević - Miloš Cvrkota - Lazar Kovačević
Qualifying draw pool B	(Australia) Perth	21–16
Qualifying draw pool B	(Poland) Warsaw	20–18
Pool D	(Canada) Toronto	15–19
Pool D	(United Kingdom) London	15–17
3x3 Kragujevac - 10 May 2026 (Kragujevac (Serbia) )		1st place
Dejan Majstorović - Marko Đorđević - Miloš Cvrkota - Lazar Kovačević
Pool A	(Serbia) Blok 70	21–14
Pool A	(Serbia) ANNS	21–11
Quarterfinals	(Serbia) Pirot	21–16
Semifinals	(Serbia) Bix agro 3x3	21–14
Final	(Serbia) Užice	22–16
L'Alqueria del Basket 3x3 Quest - 14–16 May 2026 (Valencia (Spain) )		1st place
Marko Đorđević - Vuk Vukićević - Miloš Cvrkota - Lazar Kovačević
Pool B	(Spain) Bbal Center	22–16
Pool B	(Republic of Ireland) Dublin	21–11
Quarterfinals	(France) Ermont	17–14
Semifinals	(Latvia) Jurmala	22–16
Final	(Spain) Valencia	21–12
World Tour Shanghai 2026 - 23–24 May 2026 (Shanghai (China) )		4th place
Marko Đorđević - Vuk Vukićević - Miloš Cvrkota - Lazar Kovačević
Pool A	(China) DeQing	21–13
Pool A	(Serbia) Liman	17–22
Quarterfinals	(Belgium) Antwerp	22–15
Semifinals	(China) Hangzhou	12–21
PRO 3x3 TOUR 2026 - Stop III - 5–6 June 2026 (Donji Miholjac (Croatia) )		2nd place
Marko Đorđević - Aleksa Stojanović - Aleksandar Topalović - Stojan Dodić
Pool A	(Croatia) Osijek	16–21
Pool A	(Croatia) Bazen 3x3	21–14
Quarterfinals	(Croatia) EvoCars 3x3	21–5
Semifinals	(Hungary) HUN 2	16–13
Final	(Bosnia and Herzegovina) Prnjavor	19–22
3x3 PRO Cup 2026 Finals Quest - 6 June 2026 (Arnhem (Netherlands) )		1st place
Dejan Majstorović - Vuk Vukićević - Miloš Cvrkota - Lazar Kovačević
Pool A	(Netherlands) Twente | OR	21–15
Pool A	(Netherlands) TeamNL U23	21–17
Semifinals	(Netherlands) Almere	20–14
Final	(Netherlands) Utrecht	22–13
World Tour Vienna 2026 - 12–14 June 2026 (Vienna (Austria) )		11th place
Marko Đorđević - Vuk Vukićević - Miloš Cvrkota - Lazar Kovačević
Pool B	(Serbia) Liman	13–21
Pool B	(Austria) Vienna	18–21
PRO 3x3 TOUR 2026 - Stop IV - 19–20 June 2026 (Vinkovci (Croatia) )		3rd place
Miloš Antić - Aleksa Stojanović - Aleksandar Topalović - Vukašin Arsović
Pool A	(Bosnia and Herzegovina) Ekskurzija	22–15
Pool A	(Croatia) VEVU	21–10
Quarterfinals	(Croatia) EvoCars 3x3	22–8
Semifinals	(Bosnia and Herzegovina) Srebrenik	20–22
World Tour Amsterdam 2026 - 19–21 June 2026 (Amsterdam (Netherlands) )		15th place
Marko Đorđević - Vuk Vukićević - Miloš Cvrkota - Lazar Kovačević
Qualifying draw pool B	(Germany) Baskets Bonn	14–18
Qualifying draw pool B	(Romania) Bucharest	14–21
Quest tournament Pale 2026 - 27–28 June 2026 (East Sarajevo (Bosnia and Herzegovina) )		2nd place
Marko Đorđević - Miloš Antić - Aleksa Stojanović - Lazar Kovačević
Pool B	(Bosnia and Herzegovina) Team 3x3 Zenica	21–17
Pool B	(Bosnia and Herzegovina) Caffe Rebus	21–15
Eightfinals	(Bosnia and Herzegovina) Old School	21–8
Quarterfinals	(Bosnia and Herzegovina) Rusovo	22–14
Semifinals	(Serbia) Radnički Kragujevac	21–19
Final	(Netherlands) Utrecht	16–21
Quest - BG 3x3 League & Bulut Hoops - 11–12 July 2026 (Novi Sad (Serbia) )		5th place
Marko Đorđević - Miloš Antić - Aleksa Stojanović - Miloš Cvrkota
Pool B	(Serbia) Čuka	20–13
Pool B	(Serbia) Voždovac	Walkover
Quarterfinals	(France) Ermont	15–18
Novi Sad Challenger - 18–19 July 2026 (Novi Sad (Serbia) )		10th place
Marko Đorđević - Miloš Antić - Aleksa Stojanović - Lazar Kovačević
Qualifying draw pool A	(Croatia) Zagreb Nitui	21–7
Qualifying draw pool A	(Latvia) Jurmala	22–7
Pool C	(Netherlands) Amsterdam	15–16
Pool C	(Spain) Fuengirola	16–18
PRO 3x3 TOUR 2026 FINALS - 31 July–1 August 2026 (Novalja (Croatia) )		2nd place
Marko Đorđević - Miloš Antić - Aleksa Stojanović - Lazar Kovačević
Pool A	(Bosnia and Herzegovina) Široki	22–13
Pool A	(Croatia) Radnik Križevci	20–17
Pool A	(Bosnia and Herzegovina) Venom Petrovo	22–20
Quarterfinals	(Croatia) Kozlići 3x3	21–6
Semifinals	(Bosnia and Herzegovina) Venom Petrovo	20–19
Final	(Serbia) Užice	13–16
3x3 Bijeljina 2026 - 8 August 2026 (Bijeljina (Bosnia and Herzegovina) )		1st place
Marko Đorđević - Miloš Antić - Aleksa Stojanović - Lazar Kovačević
Pool A	(Bosnia and Herzegovina) Bijeljina	21–16
Pool A	(Montenegro) No Mercy MNE	21–12
Quarterfinals	(Bosnia and Herzegovina) Sandwich box	21–8
Semifinals	(Serbia) COD	22–13
Final	(Bosnia and Herzegovina) Veterinarska VON	22–18
Singapore Challenger - 15–16 August 2026 (Singapore)		10th place
Marko Đorđević - Miloš Antić - Aleksa Stojanović - Lazar Kovačević
Pool C	(Canada) Toronto	20–22
Pool C	(China) Shanghai	15–21
Beijing Challenger - 22–23 August 2026 (Beijing (China) )		6th place
Marko Đorđević - Miloš Antić - Aleksa Stojanović - Lazar Kovačević
Pool A	(Netherlands) Amsterdam	15–19
Pool A	(China) Shijingshan	22–8
Quarterfinals	(China) Shanghai	14–21
Kaohsiung City Challenger - 5–6 September 2026 (Kaohsiung (Chinese Taipei) )		10th place
Marko Đorđević - Vuk Vukićević - Miloš Cvrkota - Lazar Kovačević
Pool D	(Chinese Taipei) Taipei	11–22
Pool D	(Japan) Shibuya	22–19
Go Too! Group Aichi Challenger - 10–11 October 2026 (Nagoya (Japan) )		8th place
Marko Đorđević - Miloš Antić - Miloš Cvrkota - Aleksa Stojanović
Pool B	(Germany) Skyliners	11–22
Pool B	Singapore	21–11
Quarterfinals	(China) Shanghai	15–22

== Total matches record at senior level ==
As of 11 October 2026

Tournaments	Wins	Defeats
World Tour Finals	-	-
World Tours	2	6
Challengers	10	13
Super Quests	-	-
Super Leagues	-	-
Quests	16	2
Lite Quests	3	1
All other open	26	7
TOTAL	57	29

== Top 3 finishes at senior tournaments ==
As of 11 October 2026

Tournaments	Played	🥇	🥈	🥉
World Tour Finals	0	-	-	-
World Tours	3	0	0	0
Challengers	7	0	0	0
Super Quests	0	-	-	-
Super Leagues	0	-	-	-
Quests	4	2	1	0
Lite Quests	1	0	0	1
All other open	7	2	3	1
TOTAL	22	4	4	2
