= 2015 SEABA Championship =

11th Southeast Asian Basketball Championship

Tournament details
- Host country: Singapore
- Dates: 27 April – 1 May
- Teams: 6 (from 11 federations)
- Venue: 1 (in 1 host city)

Final positions
- Champions: Philippines (7th title)

Tournament statistics
- Top scorer: (Philippines) Parks (14.6)
- Top rebounds: (Malaysia) Yeo (14.8)
- Top assists: (Philippines) Jalalon (5.8)
- PPG (Team): Philippines (108.4)
- RPG (Team): Philippines (51.2)
- APG (Team): Philippines (25.0)

The 11th Southeast Asia Basketball Association Championship was the qualifying tournament for the 2015 FIBA Asia Championship. It also served as a regional championship involving Southeast Asian basketball teams. It was held on 27 April to 1 May 2015 in Singapore. The three best teams at the end of the single round-robin tournament qualified for the 2015 FIBA Asia Championship which was held in Changsha, Hunan, China from 23 September to 3 October 2015.

As early as Day 4, the Philippines, Malaysia and tournament host Singapore have secured the three slots for the Asian Championships.

The Philippines, who sent an all-amateur team with one naturalized player in Marcus Douthit, won their seventh title of the tournament without losing a single game.

== Venue ==
OCBC Arena in Kallang hosted all the games. The same venue was used for the 2015 Southeast Asian Games Basketball tournament a month later.

Kallang
OCBC Arena	2015 SEABA Championship (Singapore)
Capacity: 3,000	2015 SEABA Championship (Singapore)

== Results ==
Pos	Team	Pld	W	L	PF	PA	PD	Pts	Qualification
1	Philippines (C)	5	5	0	542	200	+342	10	Qualification to 2015 FIBA Asia Championship
2	Malaysia	5	4	1	325	285	+40	9	Qualification to 2015 FIBA Asia Championship
3	Singapore (H)	5	3	2	368	228	+140	8	Qualification to 2015 FIBA Asia Championship
4	Indonesia	5	2	3	277	303	−26	7	
5	Laos	5	1	4	232	467	−235	6	
6	Brunei	5	0	5	190	451	−261	5	

Source: SEABA
Rules for classification: (1) Tournament points, (2) Head-to-head tournament points, (3) Head-to-head goal average, (4) Overall goal average, (5) Drawing of lots
(C) Champions; (H) Hosts

27 April
16:00

Stats

Brunei	43–81	Malaysia
Scoring by quarter: 4–25, 18–20, 6–18, 15–18
Pts: Chong 14; Rebs: Hj Hussin 13; Asts: Ramlee 2		Pts: Yeo 14; Rebs: Yeo 11; Asts: Tong 10

OCBC Arena, Kallang

27 April
18:00

Stats

Indonesia	36–92	Philippines
Scoring by quarter: 7–26, 12–24, 10–21, 7–21
Pts: Pamungkas 12; Rebs: Nugroho 5 Asts: Priasmoro 2		Pts: Parks 15; Rebs: Parks 6 Asts: Torres, Jalalon, Ravena 3

OCBC Arena, Kallang

27 April
20:00

Stats

Singapore	123–21	Laos
Scoring by quarter: 30–2, 26–4, 27–9, 30–6
Pts: Kwek 18; Rebs: Lim 12; Asts: Toh 5		Pts: Lothalath 7 Rebs: Phongphoumy 8 Asts: Sonenalad 1

OCBC Arena, Kallang
Referees: Joenard Garcia (PHI), Thongchai Thaweewutsophon (THA), Ting Pick Kieng (MAS)

28 April
16:00

Stats

Laos	37–124	Philippines
Scoring by quarter: 5–37, 4–32, 9–35, 19–20
Pts: Labouaphieng 11; Rebs: Lothalath, Phongphoumy, Labouaphieng 6 Asts: Phongphoumy, Sonenalad 1		Pts: Rosario 19; Rebs: Thompson 10; Asts: Thompson 7

OCBC Arena, Kallang

28 April
18:00

Stats

Malaysia	59–36	Indonesia
Scoring by quarter: 15–12, 11–7, 19–9, 14–8
Pts: Kuek 16; Rebs: Yeo 13; Asts: Tong 5		Pts: Pamungkas 18; Rebs: Kokodiputra 6 Asts: Purnomo, Gunawan, Nugroho 1

OCBC Arena, Kallang

28 April
20:00

Stats

Brunei	26–74	Singapore
Scoring by quarter: 5–18, 6–22, 7–12, 8–22
Pts: Hussin 17; Rebs: Hussin 12; Asts: Soon, Khoo 1		Pts: Lim 13; Rebs: Yeong Wooi Khaw 9 Asts: Toh 4

OCBC Arena, Kallang

29 April
16:00

Stats

Laos	75–62	Brunei
Scoring by quarter: 24–17, 14–17, 17–13, 20–15
Pts: Lothalath 35; Rebs: Labouaphieng 13; Asts: Lattana 5		Pts: Khoo 18; Rebs: Hussin 21; Asts: Ching 3

OCBC Arena, Kallang
Referees: Joenard Garcia (PHI), Chan Owe Shiong (MAS), Victor Mah (SIN)

29 April
18:00

Stats

Philippines	104–42	Malaysia
Scoring by quarter: 23–14, 34–15, 22–6, 25–7
Pts: Ravena 15; Rebs: Torres 9 Asts: Jalalon 6		Pts: Koh 11; Rebs: Koh, Kwaan 5 Asts: Tong 3

OCBC Arena, Kallang

29 April
20:00

Stats

Singapore	76–41	Indonesia
Scoring by quarter: 30–11, 19–11, 14–7, 13–12
Pts: Wu 14; Rebs: Liew, Goh 7 Asts: Wu, Wong 4		Pts: Pamungkas 15; Rebs: Nugroho, Wardana 5 Asts: Priasmoro, Pradithya, Sua, Wardana 1

OCBC Arena, Kallang

30 April
16:00

Stats

Indonesia	83–46	Laos
Scoring by quarter: 23–8, 31–19, 17–7, 12–12
Pts: Priasmoro, Kokodiputra 19; Rebs: Wardana 13; Asts: Kokodiputra 4		Pts: Lothalath 14; Rebs: Labouaphieng 10; Asts: 5 players, 5 each

OCBC Arena, Kallang

30 April
18:00

Stats

Philippines	140–29	Brunei
Scoring by quarter: 36–10, 32–6, 37–3, 35–10
Pts: Parks 19; Rebs: Rosario 8 Asts: Thompson 12		Pts: Ching 9 Rebs: Hj Hussin 3 Asts: Lim 2

OCBC Arena, Kallang

30 April
20:00

Stats

Malaysia	58–49	Singapore
Scoring by quarter: 12–11, 11–16, 16–9, 19–13
Pts: Yeo, Kuek 11; Rebs: Kuek 13; Asts: Tong, Kuek 4		Pts: Low 10; Rebs: Wong 15; Asts: Wong 5

OCBC Arena, Kallang

1 May
16:00

Stats

Brunei	30–81	Indonesia
Scoring by quarter: 2–22, 6–20, 10–14, 12–25
Pts: HJ Hussin 13; Rebs: Hj Hussin 16; Asts: Soon 2		Pts: Kokodiputra 19; Rebs: Wardana 10; Asts: Priasmoro 6

OCBC Arena, Kallang

1 May
18:00

Stats

Laos	53–85	Malaysia
Scoring by quarter: 6–27, 16–21, 13–16, 18–21
Pts: Labouaphieng 13; Rebs: Phanthady 14; Asts: Lattana 3		Pts: Ng 14; Rebs: Yeo 24; Asts: Yeo 6

OCBC Arena, Kallang

1 May
20:00

Stats

Singapore	56–82	Philippines
Scoring by quarter: 19–26, 11–25, 17–24, 9–7
Pts: Wong 17; Rebs: Wong 6 Asts: Wong, Oh 3		Pts: Douthit 16; Rebs: Douthit 7 Asts: Jalalon 4

OCBC Arena, Kallang

== Awards ==
2015 Southeast Asian champions

Philippines
Seventh title

== Final standings ==
	Qualified for the 2015 FIBA Asia Championship
Rank	Team
Gold medal	Philippines
Silver medal	Malaysia
Bronze medal	Singapore
4th	Indonesia
5th	Laos
6th	Brunei

== Statistical leaders ==
=== Points ===
#	Player	Team	PPG
1	Bobby Ray Parks Jr.	Philippines	14.6
2	Siphandone Lothalath	Laos	13.6
3	Md Zainul Ashyraf Hj Hussin	Brunei	13.2

=== Rebounds ===
#	Player	Team	RPG
1	Ivan Yeo	Malaysia	14.8
2	Md Zainul Ashyraf Hj Hussin	Brunei	13.0
3	Phouthong Labouaphieng	Laos	8.4

=== Assists ===
#	Player	Team	APG
1	Jio Jalalon	Philippines	6.0
2	Wen Keong Tong	Malaysia	5.0
3	Scottie Thompson	Philippines	4.4
