= Royals United =

- Leagues: FIBA 3x3 BRL
- Founded: 2024; 2 years ago
- Location: Vaughan, Ontario
- Team colours: Purple, Gold, Black
- Main sponsor: The Foundation Agency
- President: Casius Wray-Muto
- General manager: Eitan Shikher
- Head coach: Vacant
- Ownership: Eitan Shikher; Casius Wray-Muto
- Championships: 1 BRL Vaughan (2024)
- Website: https://royals.run.place
Origins	Icon	Aspire

The Royals United Basketball Club (stylized as Royals United B.C.) is a Canadian 3x3 basketball team based in Vaughan, Ontario. The team was founded in 2024 and competes in FIBA sanctioned 3x3 tournaments.

== Honours ==
Total titles: 1

=== FIBA 3x3 tournaments ===
- ISO KING 3x3 Basketball Tournament

Runners-up (1): 2024

- RCA3x3 - Vaughan Invitational

Runners-up (2): 2024, 2026

- Supercrawl 3x3 Championship

Third place (1): 2024

- TeamAddy 3x3

Runners-up (1): 2025
Fourth place (1): 2026
Eighth place (1): 2024

=== Regional competitions ===
- Brodie League — Vaughan

Champions (1): 2024

== Personnel ==
=== Current roster ===
Note: Flags indicate national team eligibility at FIBA-sanctioned events. Players may hold other non-FIBA nationalities not displayed.

Royals United roster
Players
Coaches

Pos.	No.	Nat.	Name	Ht.	Wt.	Age
G	00	(United States)	Jones, Kadeim	1.90 m (6 ft 3 in)		27 – 9 January 1999	West Georgia
G	6	(Israel) (Canada)	Shikher, Eitan (C)	1.73 m (5 ft 8 in)		33 – 4 April 1993	Israel
G	10	(Canada)	Small, Theo	1.85 m (6 ft 1 in)		46 – 22 January 1980	Canada
F	11	(Jamaica) (Canada)	Jackson, Kareem (TW)	1.93 m (6 ft 4 in)		36 – 19 May 1990	Canada
F	22	(Jamaica) (Canada)	Jackson, Malcolm (injured)	1.95 m (6 ft 5 in)		31 – 15 May 1995	Centennial
F	23	(Canada)	Johnson, D’Andre	1.94 m (6 ft 4 in)		26 – 8 August 2000	Nipissing
G	24	(Canada)	Williams, Daniel	1.83 m (6 ft 0 in)		32 – 29 August 1993	Fleming
C	27	(Canada) (Ukraine)	Puzyrin, Dima	2.01 m (6 ft 7 in)		21 – 27 October 2004	Canada
F	30	(Italy) (Canada)	Wray-Muto, Casius	1.88 m (6 ft 2 in)		36 – 28 December 1989	Canada

Head coach

- Vacant

Assistant coach(es)

- Malcolm Jackson
- Eitan Shikher
- Casius Wray-Muto

Legend

- (C) Team captain
- (TW) Two-way player
- Injured

- Roster
Updated: August 14, 2026

=== Head coaches ===
- (Jamaica) (Canada) Malcolm Jackson: 2024 (interim)
- (Italy) (Canada) Casius Wray-Muto: 2025 (interim)
- (Canada) Vacant: 2026–present

=== Past rosters ===
2024 Brodie League — Vaughan: finished 1st

Harman Chahal, Malcolm Jackson, David Meredith, Matthew Moschitti, Jimmy Nguyen, Eitan Shikher, Theo Small, Casius Wray-Muto (Interim Coach: Malcolm Jackson).

2024 ISO KING - 3x3 Canada Pro (Round 2): finished 7th

Malcolm Jackson, Ryan Neiman, Jimmy Nguyen, Eitan Shikher.

2024 TeamAddy 3x3: finished 8th

Malcolm Jackson, Eitan Shikher, Eden Tepper, Casius Wray-Muto.

2024 Supercrawl 3x3 Championship: finished 3rd

Ryan Neiman, Eitan Shikher, Eden Tepper, Casius Wray-Muto.

2024 RCA3x3 - Vaughan Invitational: finished 2nd

Malcolm Jackson, Jimmy Nguyen, Antonio Marin Pryce, Eitan Shikher.

2024 ISO KING 3x3 Basketball Tournament: finished 2nd

Malcolm Jackson, Eitan Shikher, Eden Tepper, Casius Wray-Muto.

2025 TeamAddy 3x3: finished 2nd

Chris Ebanks, Jonathan Ibula, Malcolm Jackson, Eitan Shikher.

2025 Hoops For All 3x3 - Basketball Beyond Borders: finished 5th

Malcolm Jackson, David Meredith, Eitan Shikher, Casius Wray-Muto.

2026 Bay City Ballers - 3x3 Canada Pro Tour Stop: finished 5th

Malcolm Jackson (injured), Kevin Hamlet, Dima Puzyrin, Eitan Shikher.

2026 Sphere Basketball - Tournoi 3x3: finished 8th

Jonathan Ibula (injured), Jyquan Lawrence, Dima Puzyrin, Eitan Shikher.

2026 RCA3x3 - Vaughan Invitational: finished 2nd

Jonathan Ibula, Malcolm Jackson, Eytan Kapelow, Eitan Shikher.

2026 TeamAddy 3x3: finished 4th

Malcolm Jackson (injured), Kadeim Jones, Eytan Kapelow, Eitan Shikher, Shikaeb Rahi Soratgar.

2026 Three Pillars Basketball (3PB): finished 6th

D’Andre Johnson, Dima Puzyrin, Eitan Shikher, Casiues Wray-Muto (injured).

== Team branding ==
=== Uniforms and logos ===
The team's two main colours are purple and gold. The official Royals United logo was created by EITANS DESIGNS. It features the team colours, team word mark, as well as a lion wearing a crown.
