= Sayeed Pridgett =

American basketball player

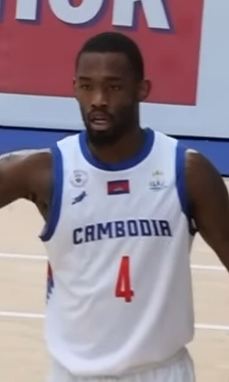
- Pridgett with Cambodia in 2023

No. 4 – Al-Muharraq
- Position: Shooting guard / Small forward
- League: Bahraini Premier League

Personal information
- Born: May 22, 1998 (age 28) Oakland, California, U.S.
- Listed height: 6 ft 5 in (1.96 m)
- Listed weight: 220 lb (100 kg)

Career information
- High school: El Cerrito (El Cerrito, California)
- College: Montana (2016–2020)
- NBA draft: 2020: undrafted
- Playing career: 2020–present

Career history
- 2020–2021: Ionikos Nikaias
- 2022: Apollon Limassol
- 2022–2023: Karditsa
- 2023–2024: Rapid București
- 2024–2026: CSM Oradea
- 2026–present: Al-Muharraq

Career highlights
- 2× First-team All-Big Sky (2019, 2020)
Medals
Men's basketball
Representing Cambodia
Southeast Asian Games
Gold medal – first place	2023 Cambodia	3x3
Silver medal – second place	2023 Cambodia	5x5

Sayeed Pridgett (born May 22, 1998) is an American-born naturalized Cambodian professional basketball player for Al-Muharraq of the Bahraini Premier League. He played college basketball for the Montana Grizzlies.

== High school career ==
Pridgett attended El Cerrito High School in El Cerrito, California. He was ruled ineligible for part of his first season for academic reasons. He averaged 17 points, 6.5 rebounds and 3.5 assists per game as a junior. Pridgett played for the Oakland Rebels on the Amateur Athletic Union circuit. A three-star recruit, he committed to play college basketball for Montana over offers from Oregon State, Creighton and Saint Mary's, among others.

== College career ==
Pridgett primarily came off the bench in his first two years at Montana. As a sophomore, he averaged 8.4 points, 4.3 rebounds and 1.3 assists per game. In his junior season, he averaged 15.1 points, 4.9 rebounds, 2.2 assists and 1.3 steals per game, and was named to the First Team All-Big Sky. As a senior, Pridgett was placed in a leading role, ranking first on the team in several statistical categories. On January 25, 2020, Pridgett scored a career-high 33 points and grabbed eight rebounds in an 87-85 overtime loss to Weber State. He averaged 19.8 points, 7.2 rebounds, 3.9 assists and 1.5 steals per game, earning First Team All-Big Sky honors for the second straight year. He finished his career with the fourth-most points in program history, and the most points by a Montana player since Larry Krystkowiak (1982–86).

== Professional career ==
=== Ionikos Nikaias (2020–2021) ===
On September 15, 2020, Pridgett signed his first professional contract with Ionikos Nikaias of the Greek Basket League. He helped the team make the playoffs after hitting a basket with 4.4 seconds remaining in an 86-85 overtime win against Kolossos Rodou.

=== Birmingham Squadron (2021) ===
On October 25, 2021, Pridgett joined the Birmingham Squadron after a successful tryout. He was waived on November 15.

=== Apollon Limassol (2021–2022) ===
Pridgett spent the rest of the 2021–2022 season with Apollon Limassol in Cyprus.

=== Karditsa (2022–2023) ===
On August 23, 2022, Pridgett returned to Greece, signing with the newly promoted Karditsa. In 20 league games, he averaged 12.9 points, 5 rebounds, 2.8 assists and 1.5 steals in 28 minutes per contest.

=== CSM Oradea (2024–present) ===
On August 6, 2024, Pridgett signed with CSM Oradea of the Liga Națională.

== National team ==
Pridgett represented Cambodia at the 2023 Southeast Asian Games in 3x3 basketball helping win a gold medal for the host country.
