= Dunkin' Raptors =

Dunkin’ Raptors
- Nickname: The Raptors
- Leagues: Thailand Basketball League
- Founded: 2015
- Location: Bangkok, Thailand
- Team colors: Red, black, white

Dunkin’ Raptors is a Thai professional basketball team located in Bangkok. The team competes in the Thailand Basketball League.

== Notable players ==
To appear in this section a player must have either:

- Set a club record or won an individual award as a professional player.
- Played at least one official international match for his senior national team.

- (Thailand) Supachai Sangthong
- (Laos) Siphandone Lothalath
- (Philippines) John Foronda
- (United States) Michael Fey
- (Indonesia) (United States) Jamarr Johnson
