= Basketball at the 2017 SEA Games – Men's tournament =

Basketball – Men's tournament at the 2017 SEA Games
- Venue: MABA Stadium
- Dates: 20 – 26 August 2017
- Nations: 9

Medalists
gold medal	Philippines
silver medal	Indonesia
bronze medal	Thailand

The men's basketball tournament at the 2017 SEA Games was held in Kuala Lumpur, Malaysia at the MABA Stadium from 20 to 26 August. The Philippines successfully defended its championship for the record twelfth consecutive time. Indonesia settled for the silver medal for the second consecutive time, while Thailand again placed in the podium (with the last podium finish in 2013) after winning the bronze medal.

== Competition schedule ==
The following was the competition schedule for the men's basketball competitions:

P	Preliminaries	CM	Classification	½	Semifinals	B	3rd place play-off	F	Final

Sun 20	Mon 21	Tue 22	Wed 23	Thu 24	Fri 25		Sat 26		
P	P	P	P	P	CM	½	CM	B	F

== Draw ==
The draw for the tournament was held on 8 July 2017, 10:00 MST (UTC+8), at the Renaissance Kuala Lumpur Hotel, Kuala Lumpur. The 9 teams in the men's tournament were drawn into two groups of four and five teams. The teams were seeded into five pots based on their performances in the previous Southeast Asian Games, except Laos, who are debuting in this year's competition.

Pot 1	Pot 2	Pot 3	Pot 4	Pot 5
Philippines; Indonesia	Singapore; Thailand	Malaysia; Cambodia	Vietnam; Myanmar	Laos

== Participating nations ==
- Cambodia
- Indonesia
- Laos
- Malaysia
- Myanmar
- Philippines
- Singapore
- Thailand
- Vietnam

== Competition format ==
- The preliminary round will be composed of two groups of either four or five teams each. Each team will play the teams within their group. The top two teams per group will advance to the knockout round. The other teams qualify to the classification round.
- Classification round:
  - 5th place: Third place teams play for fifth place.
  - 7th place: Fourth place teams play for seventh place.
  - 8th place: Fifth place team in Group B play for eighth place against the loser of the 7th place match.
- The knockout round is a single-elimination tournament, with a consolation game for the semifinals losers. In the knockout round, the winner of the third place game wins the bronze medal; the loser in the final is awarded the silver medal, while the winner wins the gold medal.

== Results ==
All times are Malaysia Standard Time (UTC+8)

=== Preliminary round ===
==== Group A ====
Pos	Team	Pld	W	L	PF	PA	PD	Pts	Qualification
1	Philippines	3	3	0	308	174	+134	6	Advance to knockout round
2	Thailand	3	2	1	274	191	+83	5	Advance to knockout round
3	Malaysia (H)	3	1	2	236	230	+6	4	Qualification to 5th place match
4	Myanmar	3	0	3	111	334	−223	3	Qualification to 7th place match

Updated to match(es) played on 23 August 2017. Source: Schedule
Rules for classification: (1) Tournament points, (2) Head-to-head tournament points, (3) Head-to-head goal average, (4) Overall goal average, (5) Drawing of lots
(H) Hosts

20 August 2017
17:00

Report

Myanmar	42–95	Malaysia
Scoring by quarter: 13-25, 11-23, 9-22, 9-25
Pts: La Ja, Wana Aung 9 Rebs: four players 4 Asts: three players 2		Pts: Wong 21; Rebs: Lim 15; Asts: Teo 4

MABA Stadium

20 August 2017
21:30

Report

Thailand	74–81	Philippines
Scoring by quarter: 12–22, 22–14, 25–24, 15–21
Pts: Lamb 17; Rebs: Jakrawan 14; Asts: Samerjai 3		Pts: Rosario 16; Rebs: Rosario, Standhardinger 10 each Asts: Amer 10

MABA Stadium
Referees: Ji Hu (CHN), Rendra Lesmana (INA), Hwee Liak Wong (SGP)

21 August 2017
18:00

Report

Malaysia	75–90	Thailand
Scoring by quarter: 23–14, 15–36, 14–17, 23–23
Pts: Lim 17; Rebs: Ting 10; Asts: Teo 4		Pts: Lamb 36; Rebs: Lamb 9 Asts: Lakhan 5

MABA Stadium

22 August 2017
18:00

Report

Philippines	129–34	Myanmar
Scoring by quarter: 31–7, 29–3, 38–6, 31–18
Pts: Jose 22; Rebs: Standhardinger 11; Asts: Tolomia 6		Pts: Kyaw 12; Rebs: Han Thei, Phyo Aung Myat 5 each Asts: Aung 4

MABA Stadium
Referees: Hwee Liak Wong (SGP), Rendra Lesmana (INA), Thongpathoum Mikeo (LAO)

23 August 2017
18:00

Report

Malaysia	66–98	Philippines
Scoring by quarter: 20–18, 15–29, 11–26, 20–25
Pts: Kuek 14; Rebs: Ting 5 Asts: Teo 4		Pts: Standhardinger 18; Rebs: Standhardinger 18; Asts: Ravena 3

MABA Stadium

24 August 2017
09:00

Report

Myanmar	37–110	Thailand
Scoring by quarter: 8–19, 8–33, 13–34, 8–24
Pts: Han 9 Rebs: Han 7 Asts: Ja, Zaya 2 each		Pts: Chanthachon 25; Rebs: Chanthachon 11; Asts: Apiromvilaichai 8

MABA Stadium

==== Group B ====
Pos	Team	Pld	W	L	PF	PA	PD	Pts	Qualification
1	Indonesia	4	4	0	271	197	+74	8	Advance to knockout round
2	Singapore	4	3	1	252	185	+67	7	Advance to knockout round
3	Vietnam	4	2	2	271	240	+31	6	Qualification to 5th place match
4	Cambodia	4	1	3	317	360	−43	5	Qualification to 7th place match
5	Laos	4	0	4	170	299	−129	4	Qualification to 8th place match

Updated to match(es) played on 23 August 2017. Source: Schedule
Rules for classification: (1) Tournament points, (2) Head-to-head tournament points, (3) Head-to-head goal average, (4) Overall goal average, (5) Drawing of lots

20 August 2017
08:00

Report

Indonesia	89–73	Vietnam
Scoring by quarter: 17–15, 30–18, 28–19, 14–21
Pts: Wisnu 17; Rebs: Enguio 11; Asts: Grahita 10		Pts: Dinh 22; Rebs: Nguyễn P. H. 13; Asts: Triệu 9

MABA Stadium

20 August 2017
14:45

Report

Cambodia	64–95	Singapore
Scoring by quarter: 24–36, 13–19, 15–31, 12–19
Pts: Toun 21; Rebs: Toun 9 Asts: Oeun, Dar 3 each		Pts: Low 23; Rebs: Goh 15; Asts: 4 players 3 each

MABA Stadium

21 August 2017
09:00

Report

Vietnam	95–90	Cambodia
Scoring by quarter: 19–17, 29–23, 27–30, 20–20
Pts: Dinh 25; Rebs: Nguyễn V. H. 11; Asts: Dinh, Nguyễn T. D. 3 each		Pts: Toun 24; Rebs: Toun 11; Asts: Toun 5

MABA Stadium

21 August 2017
15:45

Report

Laos	49–103	Singapore
Scoring by quarter: 13–26, 12–20, 12–33, 12–24
Pts: Lothalath 15; Rebs: Lothalath 7 Asts: Phetsavan 2		Pts: Kwek 18; Rebs: Raj 12; Asts: Lim, Cherok 2 each

MABA Stadium

22 August 2017
09:00

Report

Cambodia	93–58	Laos
Scoring by quarter: 28–9, 23–22, 16–10, 26–17
Pts: Chea 22; Rebs: Pek 10; Asts: Chea 5		Pts: Phannolath, Sonenalath 14 each Rebs: Nadonhay 13; Asts: Nadonhay 6

MABA Stadium

22 August 2017
15:45

Report

Singapore	54–70	Indonesia
Scoring by quarter: 19–14, 16–21, 9–12, 10–23
Pts: Low 13; Rebs: Goh 12; Asts: Wong 3		Pts: Lopez 18; Rebs: Kosasih 6 Asts: Wuysang 4

MABA Stadium

23 August 2017
09:00

Report

Laos	61–103	Vietnam
Scoring by quarter: 26–27, 9–19, 10–33, 16–23
Pts: Lothalath 25; Rebs: Nambouth 6 Asts: Lothalath 3		Pts: Nguyễn V. H., Lê 24 each Rebs: Nguyễn V. H. 21; Asts: Nguyễn P. H. 6

MABA Stadium

23 August 2017
15:45

Report

Indonesia	112–70	Cambodia
Scoring by quarter: 27–18, 24–16, 27–20, 34–16
Pts: Kosasih 25; Rebs: Kosasih 13; Asts: Wuysang 5		Pts: Toun 31; Rebs: Pek 10; Asts: Toun 6

MABA Stadium

24 August 2017
15:45

Report

Indonesia	124–54	Laos
Scoring by quarter: 26–15, 28–13, 40–15, 28–11
Pts: Lopez 21; Rebs: Kosasih 13; Asts: 3 players 4 each		Pts: Sonelath 16; Rebs: Lothalath 6 Asts: Deehounhueang, Phannolath 2 each

MABA Stadium

24 August 2017
18:00

Report

Vietnam	73–80	Singapore
Scoring by quarter: 18–19, 12–27, 20–20, 23–14
Pts: Nguyễn T. D. 17; Rebs: Nguyễn V. H. 6 Asts: Nguyễn T. D. 4		Pts: Low, Goh 18 each Rebs: Low 10; Asts: 3 players 3 each

MABA Stadium

=== Classification round ===
7th-9th place bracket

Eighth place
26 August
Myanmar	60
Laos	78

Seventh place
25 August
Myanmar	61
Cambodia	94

==== 7th place match ====
25 August 2017
08:00

Report

Myanmar	61–94	Cambodia
Scoring by quarter: 11–18, 18–27, 16–24, 16–29
Pts: Aung 16; Rebs: Aung 9 Asts: 4 players 2 each		Pts: Toun 24; Rebs: Oeun 14; Asts: Toun, Pek 5 each

MABA Stadium

==== 8th – 9th place match ====
26 August 2017
09:00

Report

Myanmar	60–77	Laos
Scoring by quarter: 13–18, 11–21, 28–16, 8–22
Pts: Kyaw 20; Rebs: Zin 10; Asts: Aung, Sei 4 each		Pts: Lothalath 22; Rebs: Nadonhay 12; Asts: Nambouth, Nadonhay 4 each

MABA Stadium

==== 5th – 6th place match ====
Fifth place
25 August
Malaysia	93
Vietnam	64

25 August 2017
14:45

Report

Malaysia	93–62	Vietnam
Scoring by quarter: 22–13, 20–23, 25–7, 26–21
Pts: Lim 24; Rebs: Lim 18; Asts: Teo 4		Pts: Dinh 20; Rebs: Nguyễn V. H. 8 Asts: Nguyễn T. D. 3

MABA Stadium

=== Knockout round ===
Semi-finals
25 August
Philippines	68
Singapore	60
25 August
Indonesia	79
Thailand	74

Gold medal match
26 August
Philippines	94
Indonesia	55
Bronze medal match
26 August
Singapore	55
Thailand	65

==== Semifinals ====
25 August 2017
17:00

Report

Philippines	68–60	Singapore
Scoring by quarter: 15–12, 17–12, 17–18, 19–18
Pts: Rosario 14; Rebs: Standhardinger 11; Asts: Amer 4		Pts: Low 14; Rebs: Goh 8 Asts: Wong 3

MABA Stadium
Attendance: Kim Bo-Hui (KOR), Chu Wei Chuen (MAS), Chan Wai Seong (MAS)

25 August 2017
21:30

Report

Thailand	74–79	Indonesia
Scoring by quarter: 17–12, 12–24, 23–24, 22–19
Pts: Lamb 26; Rebs: Jakrawan 9 Asts: Samerjai 4		Pts: Wuysang 15; Rebs: Lopez 9 Asts: Wisnu 5

MABA Stadium
Attendance: 1,200
Referees: Chang Lu-yueh (TPE), Chang Yee Chuan (MAS), Liu Chee Khun (MAS)

==== Bronze medal match ====
26 August 2017
11:45

Report

Singapore	55–65	Thailand
Scoring by quarter: 10–12, 16–21, 15–11, 14–21
Pts: Goh 16; Rebs: Goh 11; Asts: Ng 2		Pts: Samerjai 20; Rebs: Ghogar 12; Asts: Lamb, Apiromvilaichai 2 each

MABA Stadium

==== Gold medal match ====
26 August 2017
20:15

Report

Philippines	94–55	Indonesia
Scoring by quarter: 19–15, 26–12, 22–11, 27–17
Pts: Tolomia 20; Rebs: Parks 12; Asts: Parks 5		Pts: Pratama, Kurniawan 10 each Rebs: Lopez 7 Asts: Prastawa 3

MABA Stadium
Attendance: 2,123
Referees: Chang Lu-yueh (TPE), Lei Si Man (MAC), Liu Chee Khun (MAS)

== Final standings ==
Rank	Team
1st place, gold medalist(s)	Philippines
2nd place, silver medalist(s)	Indonesia
3rd place, bronze medalist(s)	Thailand
4	Singapore
5	Malaysia
6	Vietnam
7	Cambodia
8	Laos
9	Myanmar

== See also ==
- Women's tournament
