= RawCamp Academy Sharks =

- Leagues: Brodie League (2022–2024); FIBA 3x3 (2024–present); Warriors League (2024–present); TGBL (2025–present)
- Founded: 2020; 6 years ago
- Location: Toronto, Canada (2020–2023); Bangkok, Thailand (2023–present)
- Team colours: Red, Black, Grey, White
- Main sponsor: Brodie League (2024–2025)
- Ownership: Kareem Jackson
- Championships: 1: WLT (2025)
- 3x3.EXE titles: 1: R2 - Thailand (2024)

RawCamp Academy Sharks (sometimes stylized as RCA SHARKS.EXE) is a professional men's basketball club based in Toronto, Canada, and Bangkok, Thailand. The team competes in FIBA 3x3 tournaments and has also participated in the Thailand Global Basketball League.

== History ==
RawCamp Academy Sharks was founded in Toronto in 2020, by brothers Kareem Jackson and Malcolm Jackson. Kareem has previously played for Banvas Slammers, Shoot-It Dragons, and Warriors Thailand of the Basketball Thai League. Malcolm played in college for the Centennial College Colts and has represented the Royals United in FIBA 3x3 competitions.

In 2025, the RawCamp Academy Sharks went on to win the Warriors League Thailand championship.

== Players ==
=== Current roster ===
Note: Flags indicate national team eligibility at FIBA-sanctioned events. Players may hold other non-FIBA nationalities not displayed.

RawCamp Academy Sharks roster
Players
Coaches

Pos.	No.	Nat.	Name	Ht.	Wt.	Age
G	0	(United States)	Nouchanthavong, Jose (I)	1.87 m (6 ft 2 in)			USM
PF	1	(Thailand)	Diaby, Mohammed	2.00 m (6 ft 7 in)
G	3	(Thailand)	Natthakitsuk, Teerat	1.93 m (6 ft 4 in)		23 – 19 January 2003
SG	4	(Thailand)	Julathep, Thakdanai	1.70 m (5 ft 7 in)
G	6	(Thailand)	Nesteron, Sorgei
F	7	(United States)	Scott, Kenny (I)	1.86 m (6 ft 1 in)			UNCP
F	8	(South Africa) (Angola)	Sano, Musa (I)	2.01 m (6 ft 7 in)	91 kg (201 lb)	20 – 18 March 2006
G	10	(Thailand)	Noutthaphon, Donut
C	11	(Jamaica) (Canada)	Jackson, Kareem (C)	1.93 m (6 ft 4 in)
G	12	(Thailand)	Naw, Leo
G	24	(United States)	Vaughn, Donald (I)	1.95 m (6 ft 5 in)	90 kg (198 lb)	36 – 13 February 1990	VWU
PF	36	(Thailand)	Klahan, Patiphan	2.00 m (6 ft 7 in)		32 – 31 December 1993	Thailand
PG	88	(Thailand)	Calaguio, Kurt	1.75 m (5 ft 9 in)
G		(Thailand)	Lchaylaluay, Cris (R)
G		(Thailand)	Pistes, Anthony (R)
G		(Thailand)	Chanpradid, David (R)

Head coach

- Kareem Jackson

Team manager

- Kareem Jackson

Legend

- (C) Team captain
- (I) Import player
- (R) Reserve
- Injured

- Roster
Updated: October 23, 2025

== Season by season ==
=== League standings ===
Season	TGBL	WLT	FIBA 3x3		BRL				Ref.
Season	^{Thailand Global Basketball League}	^{Warriors League Thailand}	^{3x3.EXE}	^{RCA3x3}	^{Winter}	^{Spring}	^{Summer}	^{Autumn}	Ref.
2023	—	—	—	—	2	3	—	3	
2024	—	4	4	3	8	—	—	—	
2025	3	1	—	—	—	—	—	—	

=== FIBA 3x3 competition ===
Season	Tournament	Final	FR	Ref.
2024	3x3.EXE PREMIER Round.1 – Thailand	12th place	0–2	
2024	3x3.EXE PREMIER Round.2 – Thailand	Winner	4–0	
2024	3x3.EXE PREMIER Round.3 – Thailand	12th place	0–2	
2024	3x3.EXE PREMIER Round.4 – Thailand	6th place	1–1	
2024	3x3.EXE PREMIER Round.5 – Thailand	4th place	2–1	
2024	3x3.EXE PREMIER Round.6 – Thailand	3rd place	2–1	
2024	3x3.EXE PREMIER Round.7 – Thailand	Runner-up	3–1	
2024	3x3.EXE PREMIER Round.8 – Thailand	Runner-up	3–1	
2024	RCA3x3 Invitational – Vaughan	3rd place	3–1	
2025	—	—	0–0	—

== Community involvement ==
=== RCA3x3: Invitational Tournament ===
==== Summary ====
In summer 2024, RawCamp Academy Sharks began hosting RCA3x3, an annual FIBA-endorsed 3x3 tournament in collaboration with The Foundation Agency. The inaugural tournament took place at Six Park Athletic Centre in Vaughan, Ontario.

==== Results ====
Year	Location	Venue	Division I		Division II		Ref.
Year	Location	Venue	Champions	Runners-up	Champions	Runners-up	Ref.
2024	Vaughan	Six Park Athletic Centre	Toronto City Reapers	Toronto 3x3	Demons 3x3	Royals United	
2025	—	—	—	—	—	—	—
2026	Vaughan	Six Park Athletic Centre	Québec 3x3	Toronto 3x3	*vacated	Royals United	

=== Youth & pro player development ===
Coach and team owner Kareem Jackson has been involved with youth and professional player development in Thailand. He provides both individual and group training sessions, often in collaboration with the Warriors Thailand of the Basketball Thai League.
