= Martin Breunig =

German-Thai basketball player (born 1992)

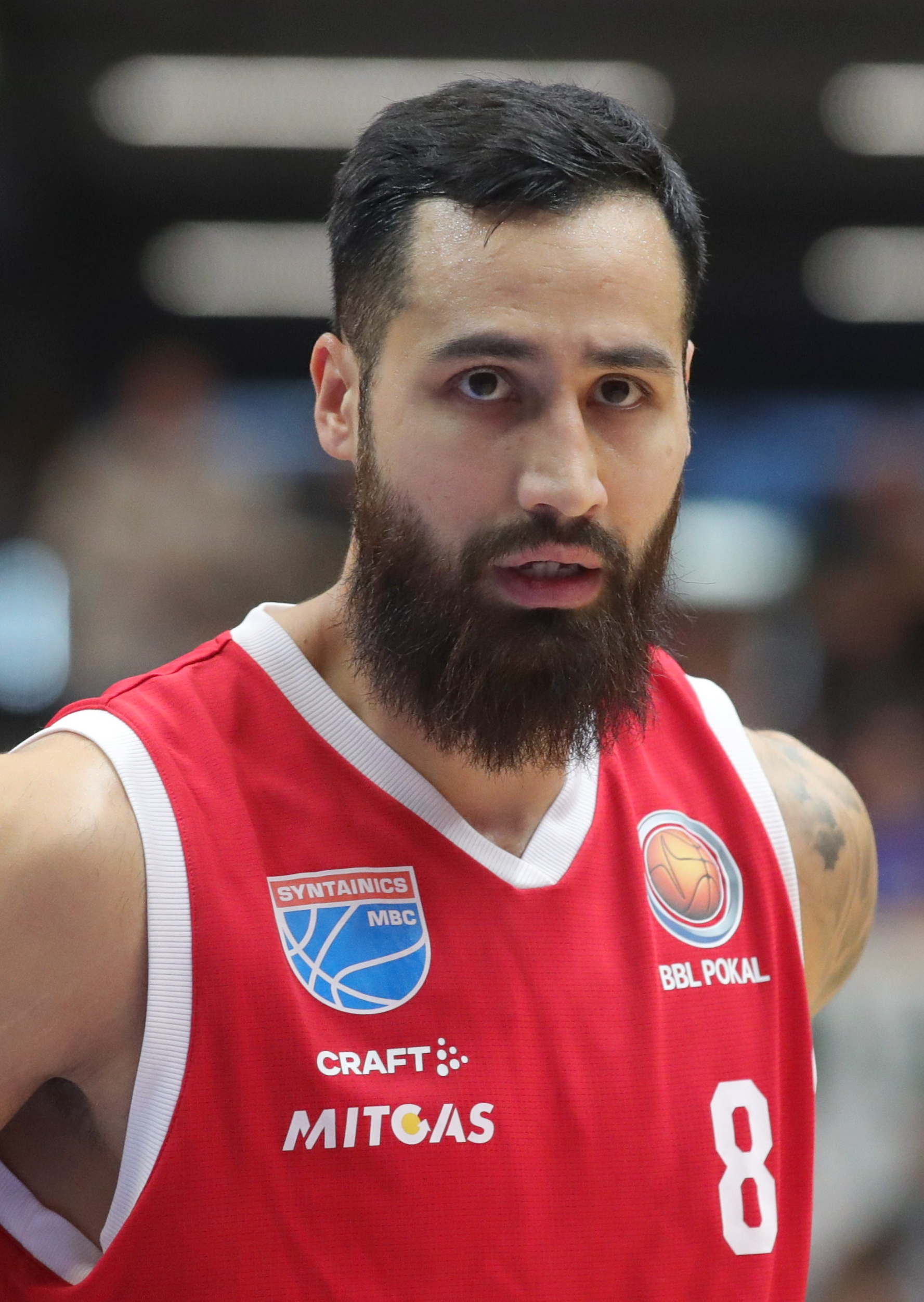
- Breunig with Mitteldeutscher BC in 2023.

No. 13 – Hamburg Towers
- Position: Power forward / center
- League: Basketball Bundesliga

Personal information
- Born: 18 February 1992 (age 34) Leverkusen, Germany
- Listed height: 6 ft 8 in (2.03 m)
- Listed weight: 205 lb (93 kg)

Career information
- High school: St. John's Northwestern Military Academy (Delafield, Wisconsin)
- College: Washington (2011–2013); Montana (2014–2016)
- NBA draft: 2016: undrafted
- Playing career: 2016–present

Career history
- 2016–2017: MHP Riesen Ludwigsburg
- 2017–2020: Telekom Baskets Bonn
- 2020–2022: EWE Baskets Oldenburg
- 2022–2025: Mitteldeutscher BC
- 2025: SLUC Nancy Basket
- 2025–present: Hamburg Towers

Career highlights
- BBL All-Star (2019); 2x First-team All-Big Sky (2015, 2016)

Martin Phong Ni Watt Breunig (born 18 February 1992) is a German-Thai professional basketball player for Hamburg Towers of the German Basketball Bundesliga (BBL).

== Amateur career ==
Breunig, son of a Thai mother and a German father, played football before he came to basketball. In the U14, he joined the youth section of the 04 Leverkusen TSV Bayer. He played for his hometown club until 2010, including on the side of Mathis Mönninghoff, Tim Unterluggauer and Till-Joscha Jönke in the U19 Bundesliga NBBL. He decided to continue his career in the United States. In the 2010–11 season Breunig joined St. John's Northwestern Military Academy in Delafield, Wisconsin and then moved to the University of Washington, where he studied and played from 2011 to 2013. Then he transferred to Montana, sitting out the 2013–14 season per NCAA rules.

While Breunig was a bench player at Washington, he became a star player at Montana. He was named to the First Team All-Big Sky Conference as a junior and was the sixth highest scorer in the Big Sky Conference, averaging 16.7 points per-game. He was the highest scoring two-year player in Montana history. Breunig was named team MVP and repeated on the First Team All-Big Sky as a senior.

== Professional career ==
Breunig started his professional career by signing in June 2016, a two-year contract with the Bundesliga club MHP Riesen Ludwigsburg. However, this contract was dissolved after just one year, Breunig moved within the league to the Telekom Baskets Bonn. During the 2019–20 season, he averaged 11.3 points and 5.6 rebounds per game. On July 20, 2020, he has signed with EWE Baskets Oldenburg of the Basketball Bundesliga (BBL).

On September 5, 2022, he signed with Mitteldeutscher BC of the Basketball Bundesliga.

On September 18, 2025, he signed with SLUC Nancy Basket of the LNB Pro A.

On October 17, 2025, he signed with Hamburg Towers of the German Basketball Bundesliga (BBL).

== National team ==
Breunig played for the German U16 and U18 national team. With the U16 he won the B Championships in Sarajevo in 2008. In 2010, he took part in the U18 selection at the European Championships in Lithuania.

== Statistics ==
SEASON AVERAGES
SEASON	TEAM	MIN	FGM-FGA	FG%	3PM-3PA	3P%	FTM-FTA	FT%	REB	AST	BLK	STL	PF	TO	PTS
2015-16	MONT	30.5	6.9-11.1	.621	0.1-0.3	.300	5.0-7.1	.708	9.0	1.5	1.1	0.7	3.3	2.2	18.9
2014-15	MONT	30.1	6.7-11.3	.593	0.1-0.4	.154	3.3-4.4	.738	7.3	1.9	0.8	0.5	3.4	2.4	16.7
2012-13	WASH	5.6	0.0-0.3	.000	0.0-0.2	.000	0.1-0.2	.500	0.8	0.1	0.0	0.1	0.3	0.2	0.1
2011-12	WASH	6.0	0.7-1.3	.536	0.0-0.2	.250	0.2-0.3	.714	1.1	0.1	0.2	0.1	1.1	0.6	1.7
