= Laos men's national basketball team =

National basketball team

Laos
- FIBA ranking: NR (1 September 2026)
- Joined FIBA: 1965
- FIBA zone: FIBA Asia
- National federation: Fédération de Basketball du Laos

Olympic Games
- Appearances: None

FIBA World Cup
- Appearances: None

FIBA Asia Cup
- Appearances: None
Home	Away

Laos national basketball team is the basketball team administered by the Fédération de Basketball du Laos.

== Tournament ==
=== Summer Olympics ===
- Yet to qualify

=== World championships ===
- Yet to qualify

=== FIBA Asia Cup ===
Year	Position	Pld	W	L
(Philippines) 1960	Not a FIBA member			
(Taiwan) 1963	Not a FIBA member			
(Malaysia) 1965	Not a FIBA member			
(South Korea) 1967	Did not enter			
(Thailand) 1969	Did not enter			
(Japan) 1971	Did not enter			
(Philippines) 1973	Did not enter			
(Thailand) 1975	Did not enter			
(Malaysia) 1977	Did not enter			
(Japan) 1979	Did not enter			
(India) 1981	Did not enter			
(Hong Kong) 1983	Did not enter			
(Malaysia) 1985	Did not enter			
(Thailand) 1987	Did not enter			
(China) 1989	Did not enter			
(Japan) 1991	Did not enter			
(Indonesia) 1993	Did not enter			
(South Korea) 1995	Did not enter			
(Saudi Arabia) 1997	Did not enter			
(Japan) 1999	Did not enter			
(China) 2001	Did not enter			
(China) 2003	Did not enter			
(Qatar) 2005	Did not enter			
(Japan) 2007	Did not enter			
(China) 2009	Did not enter			
(China) 2011	Did not enter			
(Philippines) 2013	Did not enter			
(China) 2015	Did not qualify			
(Lebanon) 2017	Did not enter			
(Indonesia) 2022	Did not enter			
(Saudi Arabia) 2025	Did not enter			
2029	Did not enter			
Total	0/32	0	0	0

=== Asian Games ===
- Yet to qualify

=== Southeast Asian Championship ===
- 1994-1996 : Did not participate
- 1998 : 8th place
- 2001-2013 : Did not participate
- 2015 : 5th place
- 2017 : Did not participate

=== Southeast Asian Games ===
- 1977 : Did not participate
- 1979–1983 : ?
- 1985 : Did not participate
- 1987–1989 : ?
- 1991 : Did not participate
- 1993 : ?
- 1995 : 7th place
- 1997 : Did not participate
- 1999 : ?
- 2001–2015 : Did not participate
- 2017 : 8th place
- 2019–2021 : Did not participate
- 2023 : 8th place
- 2025 :

== Roster ==
Roster for the 2017 Southeast Asian Games.

Laos men's national basketball team roster
Players
Coaches

Pos.	No.	Name	Age – Date of birth	Height	Club	Ctr.
SF	3	Bounthavy Hiengphothichak	25 – 23 March 1992
G	5	Kimvanh Deebounhueang	22 – 14 November 1994	1.72 m (5 ft 8 in)
PF	6	Saleumxay Nambouth	37 – 29 January 1980
G	7	Phimmasone Phannolath	24 – 13 August 1993	1.78 m (5 ft 10 in)
SG	8	Siphandone Lothalath	23 – 19 November 1993	1.83 m (6 ft 0 in)	Dunkin' Raptors	(Thailand)
SF	9	Chanthepha Phetsavan	31 – 9 April 1986	1.80 m (5 ft 11 in)
SF	10	Phetmany Xayyasena	25 – 3 October 1991	1.74 m (5 ft 9 in)
SF	11	Sengsavanh Phengyalath	22 – 26 February 1995	1.79 m (5 ft 10 in)
PG	12	Phoutthasene Nadonhay	34 – 13 February 1983
PG	15	Chaleunphon Sounthala	21 – 10 October 1995
C	21	Chittakone Meuntanh	35 – 14 December 1981	1.90 m (6 ft 3 in)
SG	88	Anouphab Sonenalath	22 – 27 February 1995	1.78 m (5 ft 10 in)

Head coach

- S. Wei

Assistant coaches

Legend

- Club – describes last
  club before the tournament
- Age – describes age
  on 9 September 2017

=== Depth chart ===
Pos.	Starting 5	Bench 1	Bench 2
C	Saleumxay Nambouth	Chittakone Meuntanh
PF	Siphandone Lothalath		Bounthavy Hiengphothichak
SF	Phimmasone Phannolath	Chanthepha Phetsavan	Phetmany Xayyasena
SG	Anouphab Sonenalath	Kimvanh Deebounhueang	Sengsavanh Phengyalath
PG	Phoutthasene Nadonhay	Chaleunphon Sounthala

== Kit ==
=== Manufacturer ===
Adidas
