= Tramar Sutherland =

Canadian basketball player

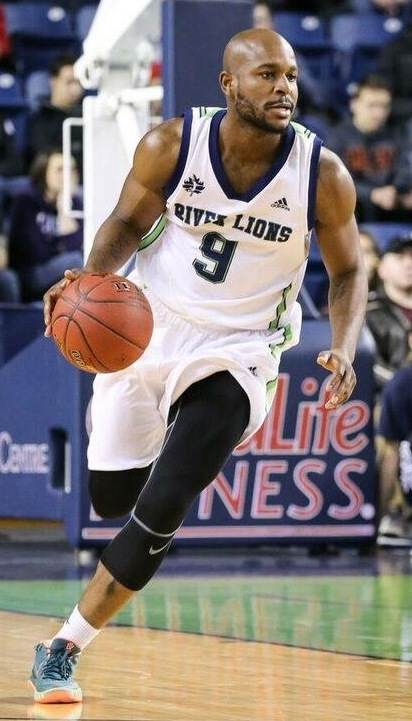
- Sutherland in January 2016

Free agent
- Position: Shooting guard

Personal information
- Born: 23 March 1989 (age 37) Toronto, Ontario
- Listed height: 1.93 m (6 ft 4 in)
- Listed weight: 91 kg (201 lb)

Career information
- High school: Father Henry Carr Catholic (Toronto, Ontario)
- College: South Plains (2008–2010); Little Rock (2010–2012)
- NBA draft: 2012: undrafted
- Playing career: 2014–present

Career history
- 2014–2015: Moncton Miracles
- 2015–2016: Niagara River Lions
- 2016–2018: KW Titans
- 2019: Hamilton Honey Badgers
- 2019–2020: KW Titans

Tramar Sutherland (born 23 March 1989) is a Canadian professional basketball player who last played for the KW Titans of the NBL Canada.

== College career ==
After playing high school basketball at Father Henry Carr Catholic School in Toronto, Ontario, Sutherland began his college career at South Plains College. He was a two-year starter and was named to the All-Defensive Team twice. Sutherland transferred to the University of Arkansas at Little Rock to play with the Trojans, and he graduated from the school in 2012. With the Trojans, Sutherland advanced to the NCAA Men's Division I Basketball Championship. In 2012, Sutherland was a part of the UALR Trojans winning the west division regular season record.

== Professional career ==
In 2014, Sutherland started his career in the National Basketball League of Canada for the Moncton Miracles. In his second year as a professional basketball player, he played with the Niagara River Lions. He was awarded the Iron Man player award for the season. Sutherland is currently a member of the Kitchener Waterloo Titans in the National Basketball League of Canada. In the 2018-19 season, Sutherland averaged 10 points, 4.2 rebounds, and 1.2 assists per game. He was named to the All-Canadian Third Team. He was one of four returning players for the KW Titans in 2019.
