= Siphandone Lothalath =

Laotian basketball player

Dunkin' Raptors
- Position: Shooting guard
- League: Thailand Basketball League

Personal information
- Born: 19 November 1993 (age 32) Laos
- Listed height: 6 ft 0 in (1.83 m)

Career information
- Playing career: 2017–present

Career history
- 2017–present: Dunkin' Raptors

Siphandone Lothalath (born 19 November 1993) is a Laotian professional basketball player. He currently plays for the Dunkin' Raptors club of the Thailand Basketball League.

He represented Laos’ national basketball team at several international tournaments. At the 2017 Southeast Asian Games in Kuala Lumpur, Malaysia, he was Laos’ top scorer in the game against Myanmar and helped secure a 78-60 victory.
