= Thailand Basketball League =

Men's professional basketball league in Thailand

- Sport: Basketball
- Founded: 2012
- First season: 2012
- No. of teams: 10: BTL; 20: TGBL
- Country: Thailand
- Confederation: FIBA Asia
- Continent: FIBA Asia
- Most recent champion: Hi-Tech (2026)
- Most titles: BTL: Hi-Tech (3 titles); TBL: Hi-Tech (4 titles); TBSL: Mono Vampire (2 titles); TEBA: Pattaya Dragons (1 title); TPBL: Hi-Tech (1 title); TGBL: TBD; WTL: Fully Feared BC; RCA Sharks; CNX Orion; JP Toy (1 each)
- Broadcasters: MONO29; Mono Plus
- Level on pyramid: 4
- Relegation to: Basketball Thai League
- International cup: Basketball Champions League Asia
- Related competitions: King's Cup; Thailand Open; Basketball Thai League; TEBA League; ASEAN Basketball League

The Thailand Basketball League (TBL) (Thai: ไทยแลนด์บาสเกตบอลลีก) is a man's professional basketball league in Thailand. The lower competitions are the TBL Division 2 and Division 3. Hi-Tech is the most decorated team in the league history.

== History ==
The Thailand Basketball League was started in 2012 by the Basketball Sport Association of Thailand to develop basketball players in Thailand. Teams are composed of both Thai and foreign players. In 2012 and 2013 teams were allowed to use 2 foreigner players on the court at the same time, but, in 2014, teams can have only 1 foreign player on the court at a time. The champions are awarded ฿3,000,000.

== Current teams ==
=== Basketball Thai League ===
- Air Force Basketball
- Banvas Slammers
- Crypto Cobra Chiangrai
- Hi-Tech
- Pathum Thani Pythons
- Shoot-It Dragons
- Thailand Gorillas
- TGE (Thai General Equipment)
- Warriors Thailand
- White Lions Basketball Club

=== Thai Global Basketball League ===
- Bangkok Gladiators
- Bangkok Wolverines
- Coastal Comets
- CNX Orion
- Dynasty Demons
- Fully Feared B.C.
- Naga Hunters
- New Era Elks
- New Force B.C.
- Overseas Supreme
- RawCamp Academy Sharks
- RMUTT
- Sathorn Galaxy
- Shoot-It Dragons
- Southern Grizzlies
- Thailand Goblins
- Thailand Gorillas
- Urban Reapers
- West Nonthaburi
- Western Thai Wolves

== Notable teams ==
- Ban Bueng Devil Rays
- Bangkok Tigers
- Black Scorpions
- Burapa Sea Falcons
- Chaophraya Thunders
- Chiang Mai Eagles
- JD T-Rex (Korat CK T-Rex)
- Khaoyai Chichi Wild Katz
- Mekong Raptors
- Mekong United BC
- MFT Khon Kaen Kings
- Mono Vampire
- Mono Thewphaingram
- Nakhon Pathom Mad Goat
- OSK R. Airline
- Pathum Thani City Wings
- Phuket Waves
- PEA
- Runnin' Raptors
- Similan Black Fox
- Suphanburi Mammoth
- SWU
- Thew Charoen Aksorn
- XTG Andaman Geckos

== Champions ==
=== Tier-1: Thailand Basketball League/ Basketball Thai League ===
Year	League	Champions	Runners-up	Ref.
2012	TBL	Thew Charoen Aksorn (1)	–	
2013	TBL	Chonburi Hi-Tech (1)	–	
2014	TBL	Nakhon Pathom Mad Goat (1)	–	
2015	TBL	Mono Vampire (1)	Mono Thewphaingram	
2016	TBL	Mono Vampire (2)	Hi-Tech	
2017	TBL	Mono Vampire (3)	Hi-Tech	
2018	TBL	Hi-Tech (2)	Mono Vampire	
2019	TBL	Thai General Equipment (1)	Hi-Tech	
2020	TBL	Hi-Tech (3)	Mekong United BC	
2021	TBL	Hi-Tech (4)	Thai General Equipment	
2022	TBL	Ban Bueng Devil Rays (1)	Hi-Tech	
2023	TBL	Phuket Waves (1)	Ban Bueng Devil Rays	
2024	TBL	Dunkin' Raptors (1)	Bangkok Tigers	
2024	BTL	Hi-Tech (1)	Thai General Equipment	
2025	BTL	Hi-Tech (2)	Crypto Cobra Chiangrai	
2026	BTL	Hi-Tech (3)	Thai General Equipment	

=== Tier-2: TBSL/ TEBA League ===
Year	League	Champions	Runners-up	Ref.
2017	TBSL	Mono Vampire (1)	Mono Thewphaingram	
2018	TBSL	Mono Vampire (2)	Hi-Tech	
2019	TBSL	Hi-Tech (1)	Kabayan Pilipinas	
2020	TBSL	–	–	
2021	TBSL	–	–	
2022	TBSL	–	–	
2023	TEBA	Bangkok Sharks (1)	Bangkok Dai Tigers	
2024	TEBA	–	–	
2025	TEBA	Pattaya Red Dragons (1)	Bangkok Coyotes	
2026	TEBA	–	–	

=== Tier-3: TPBL/ Thai Global Basketball League ===
Year	League	Champions	Runners-up	Ref.
2019	TPBL	Hi-Tech (1)	Mono Warriors	
2020	TPBL	–	–	
2021	TPBL	–	–	
2022	TPBL	–	–	
2023	TPBL	–	–	
2024	TPBL	–	–	
2025	TGBL	–	–	

=== Tier-4: Warriors Thailand League ===
Year	League	Champions	Runners-up	Ref.
2023	WTL	JP Toy (1)	Wakanda Forever	
2024	WTL	CNX Orion (1)	Wakanda Forever	
2025	WTL	RawCamp Academy Sharks (1)	Bei Yi Jinging	
2026	WTL	Fully Feared BC (1)	Naga Hunters	

== Format ==
Regular season typically starts in August. After the regular season, the league proceeds to the playoffs round, where the top 4 teams of the regular season match up for two games. The winners play in the final to determine the league champion.

Every team is required to send 1 player to the All-Star Team for the All-Star Game held in the middle of the season.

The league uses FIBA rules. Teams can have up to 2 foreign players in the roster, but teams can only use one foreign player on the court. Teams can also have as many as five players from the national team but can only use three players on the court.

== Broadcasting ==
Thailand Basketball League is broadcast nationwide regular season by Mono Plus and playoffs and finals by MONO29.

== See also ==
- FIBA Asia Champions Cup
- ASEAN Basketball League
