= Morodok Techo National Sports Complex =

Sports complex in Phnom Penh, Cambodia

Coordinates: 11°40′58.1″N 104°52′32.0″E

- ពហុកីឡដ្ឋានជាតិមរតកតេជោ
- Interactive map of Morodok Techo National Sports Complex
- Location: Khan Chroy Changvar, Phnom Penh, Cambodia
- Main venue: National Stadium; Capacity: 60,000
- Facilities: Indoor Sports Center, Aquatic Center, Training Hall, Training Field, Field Hockey

Construction
- Groundbreaking: April 2013; 13 years ago
- Opened: 18 December 2021; 4 years ago
- Cost: US$161 million
- Architects: China IPPR International Engineering Co., Ltd.

Tenant
- Cambodia national football team

Website
- www.mtn-stadium.com.kh

The Morodok Techo National Sports Complex (Khmer: ពហុកីឡដ្ឋានជាតិមរតកតេជោ) is a sports complex in Phnom Penh, Cambodia which hosted the 2023 Southeast Asian Games.

== History ==
Cambodian Prime Minister Hun Sen in August 2012 approved the creation of an inter-ministerial committee to manage the construction of the Morodok Techo National Sports Complex in a 94 hectares (230 acres) lot in Phnom Penh. Parts of the Boeung Pong Peay lake were reclaimed for the construction of the facility. According to the National Olympic Committee of Cambodia, the sports complex would be the country's first "modern multipurpose and international standard sports facility". Costing around $200 million, the sports complex's construction which began in April 2013 was funded by the Chinese government. The sports complex is meant to be the main venue of the 2023 Southeast Asian Games.

Phase 1 of the complex's construction was completed on April 4, 2017 with the inauguration of the Indoor Stadium and Aquatics Center. It also marked the beginning of phase 2 which saw the groundbreaking ceremony for the National Stadium.

== Plan ==
The current plans include six arenas and a huge weights training gym for up to 1,500 athletes. The 60,000-seat main stadium will cover a plot of nine hectares and house a football pitch and running track. It is set to host the 2023 Southeast Asian Games.

A multipurpose indoor stadium on 3.6 hectares will seat 15,000 spectators while a swimming centre on a similarly sized parcel of land will be able to accommodate 6,000 people.

There is also a proposed 3,700-seat badminton and table tennis hall, a 3,700-seat gymnastics and traditional sports hall and a 3,000-seat sports hall for basketball, volleyball and futsal.

Also in the mix are plans for four six-storey blocks of offices and four eight-storey blocks to accommodate athletes, which will include 400 rooms and two eating halls.

== Facilities ==
Venue	Purpose	Seating capacity	Year built	Notes
National Stadium កីឡដ្ឋាន	Multi-use, primarily track and field (athletics) and football	60,000	2017	
Aquatics Center មណ្ឌលកីឡាហែលទឹក	Aquatics sports venue	3,000	2017	
Indoor Sports Center មណ្ឌលកីឡាក្នុងសាល	Indoor sports venue	5,000	2017	

== SEA Games ==
Cambodia was approved to host 2023 Southeast Asian Games where opening and closing ceremonies took place.
