= 2015 FIBA Asia Championship squads =

These are the team rosters of the 16 teams competing in the 2015 FIBA Asia Championship.

== Group A ==
=== Iran ===
Head coach: (Germany) Dirk Bauermann

#	Pos	Name	Club	Date of birth	Height
4	G	Sajjad Mashayekhi	(Iran) Mahram Tehran	23 February 1994 (aged 21)	1.80 m (5 ft 11 in)
5	G	Behnam Yakhchali	(Iran) Petrochimi Bandar Imam	12 July 1995 (aged 20)	1.95 m (6 ft 5 in)
6	G	Javad Davari	(Iran) Foolad Mahan Isfahan BC	25 April 1983 (aged 32)	1.86 m (6 ft 1 in)
7	G	Mehdi Kamrani	(China) Jiangsu Monkey King	1 June 1982 (aged 33)	1.86 m (6 ft 1 in)
8	G	Saeid Davarpanah	(Iran) Petrochimi Bandar Imam	7 September 1987 (aged 28)	1.90 m (6 ft 3 in)
9	F	Mohammad Hassanzadeh	(Iran) Azad University Tehran	6 October 1990 (aged 24)	2.05 m (6 ft 8 1/2 in)
10	G	Hamed Afagh	(Iran) Petrochimi Bandar Imam	1 February 1983 (aged 32)	1.90 m (6 ft 3 in)
11	F	Oshin Sahakian	(Iran) Mahram Tehran	21 March 1986 (aged 29)	2.00 m (6 ft 6 1/2 in)
12	C	Asghar Kardoust	(Iran) Foolad Mahan Isfahan BC	21 March 1986 (aged 29)	2.13 m (7 ft 0 in)
13	F	Mohammad Jamshidi	(Iran) Petrochimi Bandar Imam	30 July 1991 (aged 24)	1.99 m (6 ft 6 1/2 in)
14	F	Samad Nikkhah Bahrami	(Iran) Petrochimi Bandar Imam	11 May 1983 (aged 32)	1.98 m (6 ft 6 in)
15	C	Hamed Haddadi	(China) Sichuan Blue Whales	19 May 1985 (aged 30)	2.18 m (7 ft 2 in)

=== Japan ===
Head coach: (Japan) Kenji Hasegawa

#	Pos	Name	Club	Date of birth	Height
0	PG	Yuta Tabuse	(Japan) Link Tochigi Brex	5 October 1980 (aged 34)	1.73 m (5 ft 8 in)
6	PG	Makoto Hiejima	(Japan) Aisin SeaHorses Mikawa	11 August 1990 (aged 25)	1.90 m (6 ft 3 in)
8	C	Atsuya Ota	(Japan) Hamamatsu Higashimikawa Phoenix	4 June 1984 (aged 31)	2.06 m (6 ft 9 in)
10	PG	Ryoma Hashimoto	(Japan) Aisin SeaHorses Mikawa	11 May 1988 (aged 27)	1.78 m (5 ft 10 in)
14	SG	Kosuke Kanamaru	(Japan) Aisin SeaHorses Mikawa	8 March 1989 (aged 26)	1.92 m (6 ft 3 1/2 in)
15	PF	Joji Takeuchi	(Japan) Hitachi SunRockers	29 January 1985 (aged 30)	2.06 m (6 ft 9 in)
16	SG	Keijuro Matsui	(Japan) Toyota Alvark	16 October 1985 (aged 29)	1.88 m (6 ft 2 in)
17	PF	Gaku Arao	(Japan) Chiba Jets	15 January 1987 (aged 28)	1.98 m (6 ft 6 in)
24	SG	Daiki Tanaka	(Japan) Toyota Alvark	3 September 1991 (aged 24)	1.91 m (6 ft 3 in)
25	SG	Takatoshi Furukawa	(Japan) Link Tochigi Brex	20 October 1987 (aged 27)	1.90 m (6 ft 3 in)
34	SF	Ryumo Ono	(Japan) Chiba Jets	6 January 1988 (aged 27)	1.98 m (6 ft 6 in)
42	SF	Kenta Hirose	(Japan) Hitachi SunRockers	11 July 1985 (aged 30)	1.93 m (6 ft 4 in)

=== Malaysia ===
Malaysia roster
Players
Coaches

Pos.	No.	Name	Age – Date of birth	Height	Club
PG	0	Wen Keong Tong	23 – September 10, 1992	1.80 m (5 ft 11 in)	Perak Farmcochem B.C.	(Malaysia)
SG	1	Chee Huei Liaw	23 – March 7, 1992	1.87 m (6 ft 2 in)	Bintulu Eagles B.C.	(Malaysia)
PG	3	Eng Heng Soo	31 – April 4, 1984	1.83 m (6 ft 0 in)	Bintulu Eagles B.C.	(Malaysia)
PF	8	Wei Hong Choo	23 – June 20, 1992	1.98 m (6 ft 6 in)	Bintulu Eagles B.C.	(Malaysia)
PF	10	Liang Chuan Yek	18 – February 24, 1997	1.88 m (6 ft 2 in)	Perak Farmcochem B.C.	(Malaysia)
C	13	Yoong Jing Kwaan	25 – July 13, 1990	2.01 m (6 ft 7 in)	Melaka 906	(Malaysia)
PG	17	Kok Hou Teo	20 – October 29, 1994	1.75 m (5 ft 9 in)	Perak Farmcochem B.C.	(Malaysia)
SG	20	Chee Kheun Ma	25 – January 28, 1990	1.79 m (5 ft 10 in)	Bintulu Eagles B.C.	(Malaysia)
C	21	Lok Seng Mak	20 – September 25, 1994	1.94 m (6 ft 4 in)	Perak Farmcochem B.C.	(Malaysia)
SG	37	Siik Yang William Soon	21 – August 23, 1994	1.85 m (6 ft 1 in)	Bintulu Eagles B.C.	(Malaysia)
PF	41	Ivan Yeo	22 – March 2, 1993	1.96 m (6 ft 5 in)	Bintulu Eagles B.C.	(Malaysia)
C	55	Tian Yuan Kuek	24 – August 3, 1991	2.01 m (6 ft 7 in)	Melaka 906	(Malaysia)

Head coach

- (Philippines) Paul Daniel Advincula

Assistant coach(es)

- (Malaysia) Choon Yean Teh

Legend

- (C) Team captain
- Club – describes last
  club before the tournament
- Age – describes age
  on September 23, 2015

=== India ===
Head coach: (India) Sat Prakash Yadav

#	Pos	Name	Club	Date of birth	Height
3	F	Vinay Kaushik	(India) Income Tax	30 August 1991 (aged 24)	1.89 m (6 ft 2 1/2 in)
4	G	Rajesh Prakash Uppar	(India) Vijaya Bank	20 January 1991 (aged 24)	1.72 m (5 ft 7 1/2 in)
7	G	Siddhant Sanjay Shinde	(India) Customs	15 June 1991 (aged 24)	1.80 m (5 ft 11 in)
9	G	Vishesh Bhriguvanshi	(India) Oil and Natural Gas Corporation	13 September 1991 (aged 24)	1.93 m (6 ft 4 in)
10	C	Amritpal Singh	(Japan) Tokyo Excellence	5 January 1991 (aged 24)	2.07 m (6 ft 9 1/2 in)
13	F	Vikas Kumar	(India) Haryana Police	13 November 1988 (aged 26)	1.83 m (6 ft 0 in)
14	F	Yadwinder Singh	(India) Oil and Natural Gas Corporation	30 December 1986 (aged 28)	1.96 m (6 ft 5 in)
15	F	Arvind Arumugam	(India) Vijaya Bank	28 January 1991 (aged 24)	1.97 m (6 ft 5 1/2 in)
22	F	Amjyot Singh	(Japan) Tokyo Excellence	27 January 1992 (aged 23)	2.03 m (6 ft 8 in)
66	G	Akilan Pari	(India) Income Tax	20 July 1989 (aged 26)	1.80 m (5 ft 11 in)
69	C	Akashdeep Hazra	(India) Indian Railways	1 July 1996 (aged 19)	2.13 m (7 ft 0 in)
96	F	Gurvinder Singh Gill	(India) Punjab	21 January 1996 (aged 19)	2.00 m (6 ft 6 1/2 in)

== Group B ==
=== Philippines ===
Head coach: (United States) Tab Baldwin Assistant(s): (United States) Alex Compton, (Philippines) Jong Uichico, (Philippines) Josh Reyes

#	Pos	Name	Club	Date of birth	Height
1	F/C	Andray Blatche	(China) Xinjiang Flying Tigers	22 August 1986 (aged 29)	2.11 m (6 ft 11 in)
5	G/F	Gabe Norwood	(Philippines) Rain or Shine Elasto Painters	9 February 1985 (aged 30)	1.98 m (6 ft 6 in)
7	G	Jayson William	(Philippines) Talk 'N Text Tropang Texters	30 June 1986 (aged 29)	1.80 m (5 ft 11 in)
8	G/F	Calvin Abueva	(Philippines) Alaska Aces	4 February 1988 (aged 27)	1.88 m (6 ft 2 in)
9	SG	JC Intal	(Philippines) Barako Bull Energy	18 November 1983 (aged 31)	1.93 m (6 ft 4 in)
11	PG	Terrence Romeo	(Philippines) GlobalPort Batang Pier	16 March 1992 (aged 23)	1.80 m (5 ft 11 in)
15	PF	Marc Pingris	(Philippines) Star Hotshots	16 October 1981 (aged 33)	1.96 m (6 ft 5 in)
22	G/F	Matt Ganuelas	(Philippines) Talk 'N Text Tropang Texters	13 June 1990 (aged 25)	1.96 m (6 ft 5 in)
23	F/C	Sonny Thoss	(Philippines) Alaska Aces	7 December 1981 (aged 33)	2.03 m (6 ft 8 in)
25	G/F	Dondon Hontiveros	(Philippines) Alaska Aces	1 July 1977 (aged 37)	1.85 m (6 ft 1 in)
33	PF	Ranidel de Ocampo	(Philippines) Talk 'N Text Tropang Texters	8 December 1981 (aged 33)	1.98 m (6 ft 6 in)
88	C	Asi Taulava	(Philippines) NLEX Road Warriors	2 March 1973 (aged 42)	2.06 m (6 ft 9 in)

=== Palestine ===
Head coach: (United States) Jerry Steele

#	Pos	Name	Club	Date of birth	Height
4	SF	Ahmed Haroon	(Canada) Guelph Gryphons	16 July 1992 (aged 23)	1.95 m (6 ft 5 in)
5	SF	Shadi Khatib		25 July 1986 (aged 29)	2.00 m (6 ft 6 1/2 in)
6	SF	Jamal Abu-Shamala		5 July 1987 (aged 28)	1.96 m (6 ft 5 in)
7	SG	Ahmed Younis	(Palestine) Hitten Club	28 June 1994 (aged 21)	1.90 m (6 ft 3 in)
8	SG	Jehad Othman Yaghmour	(Palestine) De La Salle Jerusalem	9 January 1993 (aged 22)	1.98 m (6 ft 6 in)
9	PG	Amin Salman	(Palestine) Orthodox Ramallah	9 January 1993 (aged 22)	1.75 m (5 ft 9 in)
10	PG	Imad Qahwash	(Iran) Samen Mash'had	14 April 1987 (aged 28)	1.70 m (5 ft 7 in)
11	SG	Enar Odeh	(Palestine) Birzeit	10 March 1993 (aged 22)	1.95 m (6 ft 5 in)
12	PG	Sami Owda	(Palestine) Ebal Nablos	23 January 1994 (aged 21)	1.78 m (5 ft 10 in)
13	PF	Sani Sakakini	(Palestine) Seriyet Ramallah	19 August 1988 (aged 27)	2.04 m (6 ft 8 1/2 in)
14	C	Hamza Yousef		19 October 1994 (aged 20)	1.95 m (6 ft 5 in)
15	C	Salim Sakakini	(Palestine) De La Salle Jerusalem	25 March 1987 (aged 28)	1.99 m (6 ft 6 1/2 in)

=== Kuwait ===
Head coach: (Kuwait) Khaled S M H H Yousef

#	Pos	Name	Club	Date of birth	Height
1	G	Yousiff Borhamah	(Kuwait) Al-Arabi	2 August 1994 (aged 21)	1.90 m (6 ft 3 in)
4	G	Mashari Abu Dhom	(Kuwait) Qadsia	19 March 1993 (aged 22)	1.96 m (6 ft 5 in)
5	G	Hamad Hasan	Al Kuwait	25 August 1997 (aged 18)	1.88 m (6 ft 2 in)
12	F	Abdulaziz Al-Hamidi	(Kuwait) Qadsia	16 September 1987 (aged 28)	1.91 m (6 ft 3 in)
13	G	Mashari Alshammari	(Kuwait) Al-Jahra	22 January 1995 (aged 20)	1.85 m (6 ft 1 in)
15	C	Mohammad Marzouq	(Kuwait) Al-Shabab	25 May 1992 (aged 23)	1.98 m (6 ft 6 in)
16	C	Naser Alzafiri	(Kuwait) Qadsia	19 May 1989 (aged 26)	1.94 m (6 ft 4 1/2 in)
21	F	Abdulrahman Alshammari	(Kuwait) Qadsia	18 August 1993 (aged 22)	1.93 m (6 ft 4 in)
28	F	Abdulrahman Aljuma'h	Al Kuwait	8 September 1987 (aged 28)	1.92 m (6 ft 3 1/2 in)
30	F	Abdullah AlSaeid	Al Kuwait	27 November 1988 (aged 26)	1.95 m (6 ft 5 in)

=== Hong Kong ===
Hong Kong men's national basketball team roster
Players
Coaches

Pos.	No.	Name	Age – Date of birth	Height	Club
G	4	So Sheung Ying	23 – 29 June 1992	1.87 m (6 ft 2 in)	Fukien AC	(Hong Kong)
PF	5	Lau Hoi To	24 – 29 August 1991	2.00 m (6 ft 7 in)	Eastern Basketball Club	(Hong Kong)
SF	6	Au-Yeung Wai Kong	26 – 7 February 1989	1.87 m (6 ft 2 in)	Fukien AC	(Hong Kong)
SG	7	Lee Ki	27 – 16 October 1987	1.77 m (5 ft 10 in)	Eastern Basketball Club	(Hong Kong)
G	8	Chan Siu Wing	23 – 26 April 1992	1.80 m (5 ft 11 in)	Eastern Basketball Club	(Hong Kong)
SF	9	Leung Shiu Wah	21 – 25 March 1994	1.91 m (6 ft 3 in)	SCAA Basketball	(Hong Kong)
SF	10	Xu Adam	22 – 16 February 1993	1.95 m (6 ft 5 in)	Winling BC	(Hong Kong)
SF	11	Cheng Kam Hing	29 – 12 October 1985	1.88 m (6 ft 2 in)	Eastern Basketball Club	(Hong Kong)
F	12	Lin Ho Chun	24 – 21 October 1990	1.86 m (6 ft 1 in)	SCAA Basketball	(Hong Kong)
PF	13	Wong Chun Wai	30 – 16 June 1985	1.94 m (6 ft 4 in)	Winling BC	(Hong Kong)
C	14	Reid Duncan Overbeck	25 – 28 September 1989	2.04 m (6 ft 8 in)	SCAA Basketball	(Hong Kong)
C	15	Szeto Wai Kit	28 – 8 June 1987	1.95 m (6 ft 5 in)	Fukien AC	(Hong Kong)

Head coach

- (Hong Kong) On Hing King

Assistant coach(es)

- (Hong Kong) Chiu Wing Leung

Legend

- (C) Team captain
- Club – describes last
  club before the tournament
- Age – describes age
  on 23 September 2015

== Group C ==
=== South Korea ===
Head coach: (South Korea) Kim Dong-kwang

#	Pos	Name	Club	Date of birth	Height
1	G	Kim Tae-sul	(South Korea) Jeonju KCC Egis	13 August 1984 (aged 31)	1.80 m (5 ft 11 in)
3	F	Lee Jung-hyun	(South Korea) Anyang KGC	3 March 1987 (aged 28)	1.91 m (6 ft 3 in)
4	F	Moon Seong-gon	(South Korea) Korea University	9 May 1993 (aged 22)	1.96 m (6 ft 5 in)
5	F	Choi Jun-yong	(South Korea) Yonsei University	4 April 1994 (aged 21)	2.00 m (6 ft 6 1/2 in)
6	G	Yang Dong-geun	(South Korea) Ulsan Mobis Phoebus	14 September 1981 (aged 34)	1.81 m (5 ft 11 1/2 in)
7	G	Park Chan-hee	(South Korea) Anyang KGC	17 April 1987 (aged 28)	1.90 m (6 ft 3 in)
10	G	Cho Sung-min	(South Korea) Busan KT Sonicboom	23 December 1983 (aged 31)	1.89 m (6 ft 2 1/2 in)
11	C	Kang Sang-jae	(South Korea) Korea University	31 December 1994 (aged 20)	2.00 m (6 ft 6 1/2 in)
15	C	Kim Jong-kyu	(South Korea) Changwon LG Sakers	3 July 1991 (aged 24)	2.07 m (6 ft 9 1/2 in)
22	F	Moon Tae-young	(South Korea) Seoul Samsung Thunders	10 February 1978 (aged 37)	1.94 m (6 ft 4 1/2 in)
32	C	Lee Jong-hyun	(South Korea) Korea University	5 February 1994 (aged 21)	2.06 m (6 ft 9 in)
33	C	Lee Seoung-hyun	(South Korea) Goyang Orion Orions	16 April 1992 (aged 23)	1.97 m (6 ft 5 1/2 in)

=== Jordan ===
Head coach: (Serbia) Rajko Toroman

#	Pos	Name	Club	Date of birth	Height
0	PG	Mah'd N.J. Abdeen		23 December 1987 (aged 27)	1.90 m (6 ft 3 in)
4	PG	Malek Kanaan	(Jordan) Orthodox Ramallah	7 February 1993 (aged 22)	1.76 m (5 ft 9 1/2 in)
6	SG	Alex Legion	(Qatar) El Jaish	16 November 1988 (aged 27)	2.02 m (6 ft 7 1/2 in)
7	F	Ahmad F.L. Alhamarsheh		10 October 1986 (aged 29)	1.96 m (6 ft 5 in)
9	SF	Hani Alfaraj		7 June 1987 (aged 28)	1.95 m (6 ft 5 in)
10	PG	Osama Daghles		18 September 1979 (aged 36)	1.98 m (6 ft 6 in)
13	C	Mohammed Hussein		3 March 1990 (aged 25)	2.06 m (6 ft 9 in)
20	PF	Ahmad Mahmoud Obeid		24 August 1990 (aged 25)	1.99 m (6 ft 6 1/2 in)
21	PF	Zaid Abbas		22 November 1983 (aged 32)	2.01 m (6 ft 7 in)
23	SF	Mousa Alawadi		20 July 1985 (aged 30)	1.87 m (6 ft 1 1/2 in)
33	SG	Wesam Al-Sous		24 February 1983 (aged 32)	1.89 m (6 ft 2 1/2 in)
41	C	Ali Jamal Zaghab		3 June 1988 (aged 27)	2.05 m (6 ft 8 1/2 in)

=== Singapore ===
Head coach: (Singapore) Neo Beng Siang

#	Pos	Name	Club	Date of birth	Height
1	F	Ng Shi Yang	(Singapore) SAFSA	16 September 1989 (aged 26)	1.82 m (5 ft 11 1/2 in)
2	G	Wei Jie Desmond Oh	(Singapore) Eng Tat Hornets	16 June 1986 (aged 29)	1.78 m (5 ft 10 in)
4	F	Mingrong Jabez Su	(Singapore) Tong Whye Temple	2 March 1993 (aged 22)	1.78 m (5 ft 10 in)
5	G	Wong Wei Long	(Singapore) Adroit	18 August 1988 (aged 27)	1.74 m (5 ft 8 1/2 in)
8	G	Toh Qing Huang		16 January 1995 (aged 20)	1.83 m (6 ft 0 in)
9	G	John Jing Lun Ng	(Singapore) Home United	5 September 1994 (aged 21)	1.90 m (6 ft 3 in)
10	F	Kwek Wei Meng Leon	(Singapore) Adriot	19 August 1996 (aged 19)	1.88 m (6 ft 2 in)
12	C	Shengyu Lim	(Singapore) Siglap	7 December 1990 (aged 24)	1.92 m (6 ft 3 1/2 in)
17	F	Ng Han Bin	(Singapore) Adriot	13 January 1989 (aged 26)	1.94 m (6 ft 4 1/2 in)
22	F	Kelvin Hong Da Lim	(Singapore) Eng Tat Hornets	28 September 1996 (aged 19)	1.90 m (6 ft 3 in)
23	C	Delvin Goh	(Singapore) Sin Kee	14 April 1995 (aged 20)	2.02 m (6 ft 7 1/2 in)
83	F	Chase Tan	(Singapore) Eng Tat Hornets	1 April 1990 (aged 25)	1.87 m (6 ft 1 1/2 in)

=== China ===
Chinese men's national basketball team roster
Players
Coaches

Pos.	No.	Name	Age – Date of birth	Height	Club
PG	4	Zhao Jiwei	20 – 25 August 1995	1.85 m (6 ft 1 in)	Liaoning Flying Leopards	(China)
PG	5	Liu Wei	35 – 15 January 1980	1.88 m (6 ft 2 in)	Xinjiang Flying Tigers	(China)
G	6	Guo Ailun	21 – 14 November 1993	1.93 m (6 ft 4 in)	Liaoning Flying Leopards	(China)
SG	7	Zhao Tailong	25 – 4 January 1990	1.93 m (6 ft 4 in)	Fujian Sturgeons	(China)
G/F	8	Ding Yanyuhang	22 – 20 August 1993	2.01 m (6 ft 7 in)	Shandong Golden Stars	(China)
F	9	Zhai Xiaochuan	22 – 24 March 1993	2.03 m (6 ft 8 in)	Beijing Ducks	(China)
SF	10	Zhou Peng (C)	25 – 11 October 1989	2.08 m (6 ft 10 in)	Guangdong Southern Tigers	(China)
PF	11	Yi Jianlian	27 – 27 October 1987	2.13 m (7 ft 0 in)	Guangdong Southern Tigers	(China)
G/F	12	Li Gen	27 – 27 October 1987	1.96 m (6 ft 5 in)	Xinjiang Flying Tigers	(China)
C	13	Li Muhao	23 – 2 June 1992	2.18 m (7 ft 2 in)	Shenzhen Leopards	(China)
F/C	14	Wang Zhelin	21 – 20 January 1994	2.13 m (7 ft 0 in)	Fujian Sturgeons	(China)
F/C	15	Zhou Qi	19 – 16 January 1996	2.18 m (7 ft 2 in)	Xinjiang Flying Tigers	(China)

Head coach

- (China) Gong Luming

Assistant coach(es)

- (Greece) Giannis Christopoulos

Legend

- (C) Team captain
- Club – describes last
  club before the tournament
- Age – describes age
  on 23 September 2015

== Group D ==
=== Chinese Taipei ===
Head coach: (Chinese Taipei) Chou Chun-san

#	Pos	Name	Club	Date of birth	Height
1	SF	Tien Lei	(China) Tianjin Lions	1 June 1983 (aged 32)	2.12 m (6 ft 11 1/2 in)
5	SG	Liu Cheng	(Chinese Taipei) Taiwan Beer	24 November 1990 (aged 25)	1.92 m (6 ft 3 1/2 in)
8	PG	Chen Shih-chieh	(Chinese Taipei) Pure-Youth Construction	24 September 1984 (aged 31)	1.76 m (5 ft 9 1/2 in)
9	PG	Chen Shih-nian	(China) Shandong Golden Stars	8 April 1984 (aged 31)	1.81 m (5 ft 11 1/2 in)
13	SF	Lu Cheng-ju	(Chinese Taipei) Yulon Dinos	13 April 1986 (aged 29)	1.94 m (6 ft 4 1/2 in)
14	SF	Tsai Wen-cheng	(Chinese Taipei) Pure-Youth Construction	31 May 1985 (aged 30)	1.90 m (6 ft 3 in)
15	C	Quincy Davis	(Chinese Taipei) Pure-Youth Construction	16 February 1983 (aged 32)	2.03 m (6 ft 8 in)
24	SG	Hung Chih-shan	(China) Shanxi Zhongyu	5 July 1985 (aged 30)	1.76 m (5 ft 9 1/2 in)
27	SG	Lin Chih-chieh	(China) Zhejiang Lions	11 June 1982 (aged 33)	1.92 m (6 ft 3 1/2 in)
41	C	Wu Tai-hao	(China) Shanxi Zhongyu	7 February 1985 (aged 30)	2.03 m (6 ft 8 in)
49	SG	Chen Shun-hsiang	(Chinese Taipei) Bank of Taiwan	25 May 1985 (aged 30)	1.90 m (6 ft 3 in)
76	C	Tseng Wen-ting	(China) Shanghai Sharks	6 July 1984 (aged 31)	2.04 m (6 ft 8 1/2 in)

=== Lebanon ===
Head coach: (Serbia) Veselin Matić

#	Pos	Name	Club	Date of birth	Height
4	SF	Jean Abdelnour	(Lebanon) Sporting Al Riyadi Beirut	11 January 1983 (aged 32)	1.98 m (6 ft 6 in)
5	SG	Amir Saoud	(Lebanon) Sporting Al Riyadi Beirut	18 January 1991 (aged 24)	1.85 m (6 ft 1 in)
6	PF	Ali Haidar	(Lebanon) Sporting Al Riyadi Beirut	20 July 1990 (aged 25)	2.04 m (6 ft 8 1/2 in)
7	PG	Wael Arakji	(Lebanon) Sporting Al Riyadi Beirut	4 September 1994 (aged 21)	1.94 m (6 ft 4 1/2 in)
8	C	Joseph Aby Kheres	(Lebanon) Byblos Club	3 October 1992 (aged 22)	2.06 m (6 ft 9 in)
9	SF	Ahmad Ibrahim	(Lebanon) Sporting Al Riyadi Beirut	18 February 1992 (aged 23)	2.00 m (6 ft 6 1/2 in)
10	SG	Nadim Souaid	(Lebanon) Champville SC	20 August 1986 (aged 29)	1.89 m (6 ft 2 1/2 in)
11	PG	Rodrigue Akl	(Lebanon) Hekmeh BC	30 September 1988 (aged 26)	1.86 m (6 ft 1 in)
12	C	Charles Tabet	(Lebanon) Al Mouttahed Tripoli	1 July 1988 (aged 27)	2.06 m (6 ft 9 in)
13	PF	Bassel Bawji	(Lebanon) Champville SC	26 December 1989 (aged 25)	2.03 m (6 ft 8 in)
14	SG	Jay Youngblood	(Lebanon) Byblos Club	20 July 1984 (aged 31)	1.98 m (6 ft 6 in)
15	SF	Omar Ayoubi	(Lebanon) Byblos Club	21 December 1991 (aged 23)	1.96 m (6 ft 5 in)

=== Qatar ===
Head coach: (Greece) Vassilis Fragkias

#	Pos	Name	Club	Date of birth	Height
4	C	Abdelrahman Yehia Abdelhaleem	(Qatar) Al Rayyan	26 June 1996 (aged 19)	2.00 m (6 ft 6 1/2 in)
5	PG	Trey Johnson	(Venezuela) Marinos de Anzoátegui	30 August 1984 (aged 31)	1.96 m (6 ft 5 in)
6	SG	Saad Abdulrahman Ali	(Qatar) Al Sadd	2 May 1985 (aged 30)	1.93 m (6 ft 4 in)
7	G	Daoud Musa	(Qatar) Al Sadd	2 February 1982 (aged 33)	1.93 m (6 ft 4 in)
8	F	Khalid Suliman Abdi		16 June 1986 (aged 29)	1.98 m (6 ft 6 in)
9	SG	Mohamed Hasaan A Mohamed	(Qatar) Al Rayyan	3 August 1991 (aged 24)	1.95 m (6 ft 5 in)
10	G	Abdulrahman Mohamed Saad	(Qatar) Al Gharafa	2 July 1996 (aged 19)	1.88 m (6 ft 2 in)
11	F	Erfan Ali	(Qatar) Al Sadd	20 December 1983 (aged 31)	2.01 m (6 ft 7 in)
12	C	Mohamed Saleem Abdulla	(Qatar) Al Rayyan	16 June 1986 (aged 29)	2.01 m (6 ft 7 in)
13	C	Mohd Mohamed	(Qatar) El Jaish	9 September 1982 (aged 33)	2.05 m (6 ft 8 1/2 in)
14	F	Abduallah Shaher Matalkeh	(Qatar) Al Rayyan	8 March 1991 (aged 24)	2.01 m (6 ft 7 in)
15	C	Khalid Abdalla Adam	(Qatar) Al Gharafa	27 February 1993 (aged 22)	2.05 m (6 ft 8 1/2 in)

=== Kazakhstan ===
Head coach: (Kazakhstan) Vitaliy Strebkov

#	Pos	Name	Club	Date of birth	Height
4	G	Timur Sultanov	(Kazakhstan) BC Astana	11 January 1981 (aged 34)	1.78 m (5 ft 10 in)
5	G	Jerry Jamar Johnson	(Kazakhstan) BC Astana	23 April 1982 (aged 33)	1.83 m (6 ft 0 in)
6	G	Rustam Murzagaliyev	(Kazakhstan) BC Astana	24 May 1992 (aged 23)	1.96 m (6 ft 5 in)
7	F	Maxim Marchuk	(Kazakhstan) BC Astana	17 January 1994 (aged 21)	1.98 m (6 ft 6 in)
8	F	Maxim Smirnov	(Kazakhstan) BC Caspiy Aktau	25 December 1986 (aged 28)	2.06 m (6 ft 9 in)
9	F	Anatoliy Kolesnikov	(Kazakhstan) BC Astana	6 December 1988 (aged 26)	2.00 m (6 ft 6 1/2 in)
10	C	Pavel Ilin	(Kazakhstan) BC Astana	24 May 1992 (aged 23)	1.96 m (6 ft 5 in)
11	C	Anton Ponomarev	(Kazakhstan) BC Astana	31 October 1988 (aged 26)	2.11 m (6 ft 11 in)
12	F	Dmitriy Klimov	(Kazakhstan) BC Astana	5 September 1988 (aged 27)	2.00 m (6 ft 6 1/2 in)
13	G	Rustam Yargaliyev	(Kazakhstan) BC Astana	20 December 1986 (aged 28)	1.94 m (6 ft 4 1/2 in)
14	F	Dmitriy Gavrilov	(Kazakhstan) BC Barsy Atyrau	27 November 1986 (aged 28)	2.03 m (6 ft 8 in)
15	C	Alexandr Zhigulin	(Kazakhstan) BC Astana	26 April 1994 (aged 21)	2.05 m (6 ft 8 1/2 in)
