= 2016 SEABA Cup squads =

These are the team rosters of the 5 teams competing in the 2016 SEABA Cup.

== Squads ==
=== Indonesia ===
Indonesia National Basketball Team roster
Players
Coaches

Pos.	No.	Name	Age – Date of birth	Height	Club
C	5	Dian Heryadi (C)	36 – 12 January 1980	1.94 m (6 ft 4 in)	Pacific Caesar Surabaya	(Indonesia)
PG	7	Yerikho Christophor Tuasela	21 – 27 December 1994	1.80 m (5 ft 11 in)	CLS Knights Surabaya	(Indonesia)
C	9	Untung Gendro Maryono	26 – 21 November 1989	1.98 m (6 ft 6 in)	Bimasakti Nikko Steel Malang	(Indonesia)
SF	17	Francisco Yogi Da Silva	24 – 17 April 1992	1.85 m (6 ft 1 in)	Pelita Jaya Energi Mega Persada	(Indonesia)
SG	19	Barra Sugianto	24 – 19 March 1992	1.85 m (6 ft 1 in)	Bimasakti Nikko Steel Malang	(Indonesia)
SG	20	Teddy Apriyana Romadonsyah	24 – 9 April 1992	1.87 m (6 ft 2 in)	JNE Bandung Utama	(Indonesia)
SF	24	Indra Muhamad	21 – 23 December 1994	1.89 m (6 ft 2 in)	Pacific Caesar Surabaya	(Indonesia)
C	25	Muhammad Nur Aziz Wardana	21 – 25 September 1994	1.95 m (6 ft 5 in)	Pacific Caesar Surabaya	(Indonesia)
PF	32	Restu Dwi Purnomo	23 – 4 February 1993	1.92 m (6 ft 4 in)	Bimasakti Nikko Steel Malang	(Indonesia)
SG	52	Surliyadin	25 – 19 August 1990	1.87 m (6 ft 2 in)	JNE Bandung Utama	(Indonesia)
C	99	Raylly Pratama Putra Handoyo	26 – 22 May 1990	1.94 m (6 ft 4 in)	NSH GMC Jakarta	(Indonesia)

Head coach

- (Indonesia) Antonius Ferry Rinaldo

Legend

- (C) Team captain
- Club – describes last
  club before the tournament
- Age – describes age
  on May 22, 2016

=== Malaysia ===
Malaysia roster
Players
Coaches

Pos.	No.	Name	Age – Date of birth	Height	Club
PF	8	Wei Hong Choo	23 – June 20, 1992	1.98 m (6 ft 6 in)	Westports Malaysia Dragons	(Malaysia)
C	13	Yoong Jing Kwaan (C)	25 – July 13, 1990	2.01 m (6 ft 7 in)	Westports Malaysia Dragons	(Malaysia)
SF	25	Hong Hoong Gan	–
PG	28	Chee Kheun Ma	26 – January 28, 1990	1.79 m (5 ft 10 in)
C	55	Tian Yuan Kuek	24 – August 3, 1991	2.01 m (6 ft 7 in)
PG	1	Wei Yong Ong	–
F	3	Chee Huei Liaw	24 – March 7, 1992	1.87 m (6 ft 2 in)
SF	11	Yi Hou Wong	–
PG	17	Kok Hou Teo	21 – October 29, 1994	1.75 m (5 ft 9 in)
C	21	Lok Seng Mak	21 – September 25, 1994	1.94 m (6 ft 4 in)
SF	23	Cheng Wah Chin	–
PF	41	Ivan Yeo	23 – March 2, 1993	1.96 m (6 ft 5 in)	Westports Malaysia Dragons	(Malaysia)

Head coach

- (Malaysia) Goh Cheng Huat

Legend

- (C) Team captain
- Club – describes last
  club before the tournament
- Age – describes age
  on May 22, 2016

=== Philippines ===
Philippines men's national basketball team - 2016 SEABA Stankovic Cup roster
Players
Coaches

Pos.	No.	Name	Age – Date of birth	Height	Club	Ctr.
G	5	Almond Vosotros	26 – 26 January 1990	1.78 m (5 ft 10 in)	Blackwater Elite	(Philippines)
G	6	Jio Jalalon	–	1.78 m (5 ft 10 in)	Racal Tile Masters	(Philippines)
F	8	Russel Escoto	–	1.98 m (6 ft 6 in)	Phoenix Petroleum Accelerators	(Philippines)
F	9	Raymar Jose	–	1.93 m (6 ft 4 in)	Phoenix Petroleum Accelerators	(Philippines)
F	12	Mac Belo	23 – 12 February 1993	1.93 m (6 ft 4 in)	Phoenix Petroleum Accelerators	(Philippines)
G	13	Mike Tolomia	–	1.80 m (5 ft 11 in)	Phoenix Petroleum Accelerators	(Philippines)
G	14	Kevin Ferrer	23 – 26 March 1993	1.93 m (6 ft 4 in)	Mighty Sports	(Philippines)
F	15	Jonas Tibayan	17 – 27 January 1999	1.82 m (6 ft 0 in)	Chiang Kai Shek College	(Philippines)
G/F	16	Roger Pogoy	23 – 16 June 1992	1.91 m (6 ft 3 in)	Phoenix Petroleum Accelerators	(Philippines)
F	18	Troy Rosario (C)	24 – 20 January 1992	2.01 m (6 ft 7 in)	Tropang TNT	(Philippines)
F	19	Von Pessumal	23 – 12 February 1993	1.88 m (6 ft 2 in)	Tanduay Light Rhum Masters	(Philippines)
C	20	Ken Holmqvist	–	2.03 m (6 ft 8 in)	Far Eastern University	(Philippines)

Head coach

- (Philippines) Nash Racela

Assistant coach(es)

- (Philippines) Michael Oliver
- (Philippines) Joshua Vincent Racela

Legend

- (C) Team captain
- Club – describes last
  club before the tournament
- Age – describes age
  on May 22, 2016

=== Singapore ===
Singapore National Basketball Team roster
Players
Coaches

Pos.	No.	Name	Age – Date of birth	Height	Club
F	1	Ding Long Tay	–
F	3	Weng Hon Remus Low	–
G	8	Qing Huang Toh (C)	–	1.83 m (6 ft 0 in)	Singapore Slingers	(Singapore)
G	9	Jing Lun John Ng	–	1.90 m (6 ft 3 in)	Singapore Slingers	(Singapore)
F	10	Leon Kwek	–	1.88 m (6 ft 2 in)	Singapore Slingers	(Singapore)
F	12	Shengyu Lim	25 – 7 December 1990	1.90 m (6 ft 3 in)	National University of Singapore	(Singapore)
F	13	Zao Liang Lyon Chia	–
F	20	Wei Jie Andrew Tang	–
F	22	Kelvin Lim	–	1.90 m (6 ft 3 in)	Singapore Slingers	(Singapore)
C	23	Delvin Goh	21 – 4 February 1995	2.00 m (6 ft 7 in)	Singapore Slingers	(Singapore)
C	26	Yong Cheng Justin Lim	–
F	83	Chase Tan	–

Head coach

- (Singapore) Neo Nam Kheng

Legend

- (C) Team captain
- Club – describes last
  club before the tournament
- Age – describes age
  on May 22, 2016

=== Thailand ===
Thailand National Basketball Team roster
Players
Coaches

Pos.	No.	Name	Age – Date of birth	Height	Club	Ctr.
G	7	Jittaphon Towaroj	24 – 7 August 1991	1.82 m (6 ft 0 in)		(Thailand)
F	8	Nakorn Jaisanuk	24 – 18 November 1991	1.90 m (6 ft 3 in)		(Thailand)
F	9	Pairach Sekteera	–
G	12	Bandit Lakhan	–		Hi-Tech Bangkok City	(Thailand)
C	13	Chanachon Klahan (C)	32 – 3 February 1984	1.95 m (6 ft 5 in)
C	15	Sukhdave Ghogar	25 – 1 August 1990	2.00 m (6 ft 7 in)	Hi-Tech Bangkok City	(Thailand)
C	36	Patiphan Klahan	23 – 29 June 1993	2.00 m (6 ft 7 in)		(Thailand)
F	55	Attaporn Lertmalaiporn	33 – 2 May 1983	1.98 m (6 ft 6 in)	Hi-Tech Bangkok City	(Thailand)
F	65	Teerawat Chanthachon	21 – 23 April 1995	1.91 m (6 ft 3 in)		(Thailand)
F	69	Darongpan Apiromvilaichai	31 – 4 March 1985	1.90 m (6 ft 3 in)
F	77	Chitchai Ananti	–
G	99	Kannut Samerjai	27 – 17 October 1988	1.85 m (6 ft 1 in)

Head coach

- (United Kingdom) Tim Lewis

Legend

- (C) Team captain
- Club – describes last
  club before the tournament
- Age – describes age
  on May 22, 2016
