= 2015 FIBA Asia Championship =

Basketball championship

Tournament details
- Host country: China
- City: Changsha
- Dates: 23 September – 3 October
- Teams: 16
- Venues: 2 (in 1 host city)

Final positions
- Champions: China (16th title)
- Runners-up: Philippines
- Third place: Iran
- Fourth place: Japan

Tournament statistics
- MVP: (China) Yi Jianlian
- Top scorer: (Palestine) Sani Sakakini (22.4 points per game)

The 2015 FIBA Asia Championship was the 28th and last edition of the FIBA Asia Championship in men's basketball in Asia. It was organised by FIBA Asia.

At the FIBA Asia Congress held in Doha, Qatar, the Central Board awarded the hosting rights to China. On 4 December 2014, the Chinese Basketball Association acquired approval from FIBA Asia to hold the men's championship at Changsha, Hunan, with the women's championship to be held at Wuhan, Hubei.

As the winner of the tournament, China qualified for the basketball tournament at the 2016 Summer Olympics, while the Philippines, Iran, and Japan would participate at the 2016 FIBA World Olympic Qualifying Tournament for Men, as stated by FIBA and the IOC in qualification quota.

The 2015 edition was the last FIBA Asia Championship, rebranded effective in 2017 as the FIBA Asia Cup and would include teams from FIBA Oceania.

== Qualification ==
According to the FIBA Asia rules, the host nation China and 2014 FIBA Asia Cup champions Iran automatically qualified. East Asia, West Asia, Southeast Asia, and the Gulf each had two berths while Central Asia and South Asia each had one slot allotted. The other four berths were allocated to the zones according to performance in the 2014 FIBA Asia Cup. Therefore, with Chinese Taipei, Philippines, Jordan, and Japan finishing in the top four in that tournament other than Iran and China which were both direct qualifiers, East Asia gained another two berths while the Southeast Asia and West Asia gained an additional slot each.

Event	Date	Location	Vacancies	Qualified
Host Nation	24 July 2014	(Qatar) Doha	1	China
2014 FIBA Asia Cup	11–19 July 2014	(China) Wuhan	1	Iran
Central Asian Qualifying Round	27 April 2015	(Kazakhstan) Astana	1	Kazakhstan
East Asian Basketball Championship	Cancelled	—N/a	4	South Korea; Chinese Taipei; Japan; Hong Kong
Gulf Basketball Championship	13–20 October 2014	(Saudi Arabia) Dammam	2	Qatar; Kuwait
SABA Championship	3–5 July 2015	(India) Bengaluru	1	India
Southeast Asian Basketball Championship	27 April–1 May 2015	Singapore	3	Philippines; Malaysia; Singapore
West Asian Basketball Championship	29 May–3 June 2015	(Jordan) Amman	3	Lebanon; Jordan; Palestine

== Venues ==
2015 FIBA Asia Championship (Hunan)

Changsha was chosen by the Chinese Basketball Association (CBA) as the venue city of the men's championship. Changsha Social Work College's gymnasium was chosen as the primary stadium, while Central South University of Forestry and Technology's gymnasium was the auxiliary stadium.

== Draw ==
The draw was held at Changsha on 27 June 2015. Two teams that were unknown at the date of the draw, the South Asia qualifier and the last remaining team from East Asia were known a short time after.

The top four teams from 2013 were seeded; all other teams except the host team were drawn. By the time that there were three teams in each group, China chose their group, then the remaining three unseeded teams were drawn.

Included were the teams' FIBA World Rankings on the day the draw was made.

Pot 1 (Seeded teams)	Pot 2 (Unseeded teams)			Pot 3 (Host team)
Chinese Taipei (44); Iran (17); Philippines (31); South Korea (28)	Japan (47); Jordan (29); Kazakhstan (53); Kuwait (70)	Lebanon (34); Malaysia (T-71); Palestine (T-86); Qatar (48)	Singapore (T-88) * South Asian team * East Asian team	China (14)

* Later determined as India (ranked 61st) and Hong Kong (ranked 69th), respectively.

== Squads ==
Each team had a roster of twelve players. A team may opt to allocate a roster spot to a naturalized player.

== Tournament format ==
- Preliminary round: The sixteen teams were grouped into four groups of four. Each team played all of the teams from its group once. The top three teams with the best record advanced to the second round.
- Second round: The qualified teams from groups A and B formed Group E, while those from Groups C and D formed Group F. The results against the teams that had also qualified were carried over. The teams played the teams from the group they had not faced before. The top four teams from each group proceeded to the final round.
- Classification round:
  - Teams eliminated in the preliminary round would be in a single elimination tournament with consolation games to play for 13th place.
  - Teams eliminated in the second round would figure in a single elimination tournament with consolation games to play for 9th place.
- Final round: The remaining teams would figure in a single elimination tournament with consolation games. The champion would qualify to the 2016 Summer Olympics. The runner-up, third and fourth placer would qualify to the Final Olympic Qualifying Tournament.

== Preliminary round ==
All times were local (UTC+8).

=== Group A ===
Pos	Team	Pld	W	L	PF	PA	PD	Pts	Qualification
1	Iran	3	3	0	296	156	+140	6	Advanced to second round
2	Japan	3	2	1	250	199	+51	5	Advanced to second round
3	India	3	1	2	233	244	−11	4	Advanced to second round
4	Malaysia	3	0	3	163	343	−180	3	Proceeded to classification round

Source: FIBA
Rules for classification: 1) Points; 2) Head-to-head results; 3) Points difference; 4) Points scored; 5) Drawing of lots.

23 September 2015
14:30

Boxscore

Iran	86–48	Japan
Scoring by quarter: 15–11, 22–11, 21–14, 28–12
Pts: Sahakian 15; Rebs: Nikkhah Bahrami 9 Asts: Afagh 3		Pts: Takeuchi 10; Rebs: Takeuchi 11; Asts: Hiejima 2

Changsha Social Work College's gymnasium, Changsha
Referees: Rabah Noujaim (LIB), Yevgeniy Mikheyev (KAZ), Wen Keming (CHN)

23 September 2015
19:30

Boxscore

Malaysia	73–102	India
Scoring by quarter: 19–29, 13–18, 12–26, 29–29
Pts: Yeo 18; Rebs: Yeo 10; Asts: M. L. Seng 3		Pts: Amj. Singh 24; Rebs: Amj. Singh 10; Asts: Pari 7

Central South University of Forestry and Technology's gymnasium, Changsha
Referees: Naser Abu Rashed (JOR), Chung Yi-chih (TPE), Peng Ling (CHN)

24 September 2015
11:45

Boxscore

Iran	88–66	India
Scoring by quarter: 27–11, 12–19, 24–18, 25–18
Pts: Hassanzadeh 18; Rebs: Nikkhah Bahrami 7 Asts: Nikkhah Bahrami 4		Pts: Amj. Singh 26; Rebs: Amj. Singh 9 Asts: Bhriguvanshi 4

Changsha Social Work College's gymnasium, Changsha
Referees: Marwan Egho (LIB), Chen Ying-cheng (TPE), Duan Zhu (CHN)

24 September 2015
14:30

Boxscore

Japan	119–48	Malaysia
Scoring by quarter: 32–9, 27–14, 35–2, 25–23
Pts: Matsui 25; Rebs: Ono, Ota 8 Asts: Tanaka 6		Pts: C. K. Ma 11; Rebs: W. H. Choo 8 Asts: five players 1

Changsha Social Work College's gymnasium, Changsha
Referees: Rabah Noujaim (LIB), Chung Yi-chih (TPE), Peng Ling (CHN)

25 September 2015
09:30

Boxscore

Malaysia	42–122	Iran
Scoring by quarter: 5–35, 3–27, 18–30, 16–30
Pts: W. H. Choo 16; Rebs: W. H. Choo, Y. J. Kwaan 4 Asts: W. K. Tong, Y. J. Kwaan 2		Pts: Hassanzadeh 28; Rebs: Hassanzadeh 18; Asts: Davarpanah 5

Changsha Social Work College's gymnasium, Changsha
Referees: Rabah Noujaim (LIB), Chung Yi-chih (TPE), Ye Nan (CHN)

25 September 2015
14:30

Boxscore

India	65–83	Japan
Scoring by quarter: 18–15, 14–24, 20–24, 13–20
Pts: Bhriguvanshi 24; Rebs: Amr. Singh 10; Asts: Bhriguvanshi 5		Pts: Takeuchi 22; Rebs: Takeuchi 19; Asts: Tabuse 8

Changsha Social Work College's gymnasium, Changsha
Referees: Harja Jaladri (INA), Hwang In-tae (KOR), Yevgeniy Mikheyev (KAZ)

=== Group B ===
Pos	Team	Pld	W	L	PF	PA	PD	Pts	Qualification
1	Palestine	3	3	0	250	221	+29	6	Advanced to second round
2	Philippines	3	2	1	284	189	+95	5	Advanced to second round
3	Hong Kong	3	1	2	216	236	−20	4	Advanced to second round
4	Kuwait	3	0	3	183	287	−104	3	Proceeded to classification round

Source: FIBA
Rules for classification: 1) Points; 2) Head-to-head results; 3) Points difference; 4) Points scored; 5) Drawing of lots.

23 September 2015
09:30

Boxscore

Kuwait	50–87	Hong Kong
Scoring by quarter: 17–15, 9–14, 11–25, 13–33
Pts: Abu Dhom 15; Rebs: Aljuma'h 8 Asts: three players 2		Pts: K. Lee 15; Rebs: Reid 13; Asts: W. Au-Yeung, K. Cheng 5

Changsha Social Work College's gymnasium, Changsha
Referees: Andryushkin Arsen (KAZ), Hwang In-tae (KOR), Nan Ye (CHN)

23 September 2015
11:45

Boxscore

Philippines	73–75	Palestine
Scoring by quarter: 27–12, 18–28, 14–15, 14–20
Pts: Blatche 21; Rebs: Blatche 11; Asts: Blatche, Intal 2		Pts: Abu-Shamala 26; Rebs: Abu-Shamala 15; Asts: three players 3

Changsha Social Work College's gymnasium, Changsha
Referees: Marwan Egho (LIB), Duan Zhu (CHN), Victor Mah (SIN)

24 September 2015
09:30

Boxscore

Philippines	101–50	Hong Kong
Scoring by quarter: 28–15, 23–7, 32–16, 18–12
Pts: William 21; Rebs: Blatche, De Ocampo 8 Asts: Ganuelas-Rosser 3		Pts: S. Chan 13; Rebs: C. Wong 10; Asts: Reid 5

Changsha Social Work College's gymnasium, Changsha
Referees: Naser Rashed (JOR), Andryushkin Arsen (KAZ), Victor Mah (SIN)

24 September 2015
19:30

Boxscore

Palestine	90–69	Kuwait
Scoring by quarter: 26–16, 23–19, 26–10, 15–24
Pts: San. Sakakini 25; Rebs: San. Sakakini 8 Asts: Qahwash 8		Pts: Hasan 19; Rebs: A. Al-Shammari 9 Asts: three players 2

Central South University of Forestry and Technology's gymnasium, Changsha
Referees: Yevgeniy Mikheyev (KAZ), Hwang In-tae (KOR), Nan Ye (CHN)

25 September 2015
16:45

Boxscore

Kuwait	64–110	Philippines
Scoring by quarter: 11–34, 16–21, 21–32, 16–23
Pts: A. Al-Shammari 15; Rebs: A. Al-Shammari, Borhamah 4 Asts: Alsaeid 5		Pts: Romeo 19; Rebs: Taulava 10; Asts: four players 2

Changsha Social Work College's gymnasium, Changsha
Referees: Andryushkin Arsen (KAZ), Naser Rashed (JOR), Victor Mah (SIN)

25 September 2015
19:30

Boxscore

Hong Kong	79–85	Palestine
Scoring by quarter: 18–30, 18–22, 14–17, 29–16
Pts: K. Lee 26; Rebs: C. Wong 9 Asts: S. Chan 4		Pts: Qahwash 24; Rebs: San. Sakakini 16; Asts: San. Sakakini 8

Central South University of Forestry and Technology's gymnasium, Changsha
Referees: Marwan Egho (LIB), Chen Ying-cheng (TPE), Peng Ling (CHN)

=== Group C ===
Pos	Team	Pld	W	L	PF	PA	PD	Pts	Qualification
1	China (H)	3	3	0	251	182	+69	6	Advanced to second round
2	South Korea	3	2	1	247	181	+66	5	Advanced to second round
3	Jordan	3	1	2	225	239	−14	4	Advanced to second round
4	Singapore	3	0	3	155	276	−121	3	Proceeded to classification round

Source: FIBA
Rules for classification: 1) Points; 2) Head-to-head results; 3) Points difference; 4) Points scored; 5) Drawing of lots.
(H) Hosts

23 September 2015
16:45

Boxscore

South Korea	87–60	Jordan
Scoring by quarter: 19–8, 15–19, 29–20, 24–13
Pts: Cho 19; Rebs: Yang 7 Asts: Yang 9		Pts: Al-Awadi 14; Rebs: Abbas 9 Asts: Daghles 4

Changsha Social Work College's gymnasium, Changsha
Referees: Amirhossein Safarzadeh (IRI), Snehal Bendke (IND), Ricor Buaron (PHI)

23 September 2015
19:30

Boxscore

Singapore	42–91	China
Scoring by quarter: 5–26, 14–22, 12–25, 11–18
Pts: W.L. Wong 15; Rebs: Goh 6 Asts: Oh 1		Pts: Zhai 13; Rebs: Zhai 9 Asts: Guo 6

Changsha Social Work College's gymnasium, Changsha
Referees: Mohammad Al-Amiri (KUW), Anan Daraghma (PLE), Harja Jaladri (INA)

24 September 2015
19:30

Boxscore

South Korea	73–76	China
Scoring by quarter: 27–14, 17–19, 16–18, 13–25
Pts: Yang 24; Rebs: Yang 10; Asts: Cho, Yang 3		Pts: Q. Zhou 21; Rebs: Yi 11; Asts: J. Zhao 5

Changsha Social Work College's gymnasium, Changsha
Referees: Ferdinand Pascual (PHI), Atanu Banerjee (IND), Toru Katayose (JPN)

24 September 2015
21:30

Boxscore

Jordan	98–68	Singapore
Scoring by quarter: 34–13, 17–19, 29–13, 18–23
Pts: Legion 19; Rebs: Zaghab 10; Asts: Abdeen 5		Pts: Lim S. 19; Rebs: Goh 10; Asts: four players 2

Central South University of Forestry and Technology's gymnasium, Changsha
Referees: Amirhossein Safarzadeh (IRN), Snehal Bendke (IND), Chan Owe Shiong (MAS)

25 September 2015
11:45

Boxscore

Singapore	45–87	South Korea
Scoring by quarter: 13–26, 8–19, 11–22, 13–20
Pts: M. Wei 10; Rebs: Goh 10; Asts: W.L. Wong 4		Pts: Kim J.K. 17; Rebs: Choi 10; Asts: Choi 8

Changsha Social Work College's gymnasium, Changsha
Referees: Toru Katayose (JPN), Chan Owe Shiong (MAS), Ceciline Vincent (IND)

25 September 2015
19:30

Boxscore

China	84–67	Jordan
Scoring by quarter: 23–22, 16–12, 22–17, 23–16
Pts: Yi 26; Rebs: Yi 14; Asts: J. Zhao 8		Pts: Abbas 22; Rebs: Al-Awadi, Al-Hamarsheh 6 Asts: Abdeen, Daghles 2

Changsha Social Work College's gymnasium, Changsha
Referees: Mohammad Al-Amiri (KUW), Snehal Bendke (IND), Ricor Buaron (PHI)

=== Group D ===
Pos	Team	Pld	W	L	PF	PA	PD	Pts	Qualification
1	Qatar	3	2	1	248	247	+1	5 (Note: Lebanon–Qatar 100–105)	Advanced to second round
2	Lebanon	3	2	1	283	247	+36	5	Advanced to second round
3	Kazakhstan	3	1	2	214	243	−29	4 (Note: Chinese Taipei–Kazakhstan 73–84)	Advanced to second round
4	Chinese Taipei	3	1	2	232	240	−8	4	Proceeded to classification round

Source: FIBA
Rules for classification: 1) Points; 2) Head-to-head results; 3) Points difference; 4) Points scored; 5) Drawing of lots.
Notes:

23 September 2015
21:30

Boxscore

Chinese Taipei	87–92	Lebanon
Scoring by quarter: 20–29, 21–14, 16–26, 30–23
Pts: Davis 23; Rebs: Lin Chih-chieh 7 Asts: Lin Chih-chieh, Tseng Wen-ting 3		Pts: Ibrahim 23; Rebs: Abdelnour 7 Asts: Abdelnour 3

Changsha Social Work College's gymnasium, Changsha
Referees: Ferdinand Pascual (PHI), Atanu Banerjee (IND), Yuji Hirahara (JPN)

23 September 2015
21:30

Boxscore

Qatar	79–75 (OT)	Kazakhstan
Scoring by quarter: 14–20, 16–14, 21–21, 20–16, Overtime: 8–4
Pts: Johnson 31; Rebs: Johnson 14; Asts: Johnson 4		Pts: Johnson 26; Rebs: Ponomarev 18; Asts: Johnson 7

Central South University of Forestry and Technology's gymnasium, Changsha
Referees: Yuen Chun Yip (HKG), Toru Katayose (JPN), Ceciline Vincent (IND)

24 September 2015
16:45

Boxscore

Chinese Taipei	73–84	Kazakhstan
Scoring by quarter: 7–25, 23–17, 16–16, 27–26
Pts: Liu Cheng 21; Rebs: Lin Chih-chieh 10; Asts: Hung Chih-shan 4		Pts: Ponomarev 18; Rebs: Ponomarev 14; Asts: Johnson 8

Changsha Social Work College's gymnasium, Changsha
Referees: Mohammad Al-Amiri (KUW), Yuji Hirahara (JPN), Ceciline Vincent (IND)

24 September 2015
21:30

Boxscore

Lebanon	100–105 (2OT)	Qatar
Scoring by quarter: 17–7, 25–20, 8–27, 23–19, Overtime: 13–13, 14–19
Pts: Haidar 24; Rebs: Haidar 11; Asts: Arakji 7		Pts: Johnson 31; Rebs: Adam, Mohd Mohamed 9 Asts: Johnson, Mohd Mohamed 2

Changsha Social Work College's gymnasium, Changsha
Referees: Harja Jaladri (INA), Ricor Buaron (PHI), Yuen Chun Yip (HKG)

25 September 2015
21:30

Boxscore

Qatar	64–72	Chinese Taipei
Scoring by quarter: 20–17, 16–11, 11–20, 17–24
Pts: Johnson 15; Rebs: Mohd Mohamed 9 Asts: Saad 3		Pts: Lin Chih-chieh 14; Rebs: Davis 10; Asts: Liu Cheng, Tseng Wen-ting 4

Changsha Social Work College's gymnasium, Changsha
Referees: Amirhossein Safarzadeh (IRI), Atanu Banerjee (IND), Anan Daraghma (PLE)

25 September 2015
21:30

Boxscore

Kazakhstan	55–91	Lebanon
Scoring by quarter: 16–15, 8–26, 17–22, 14–28
Pts: Ponomarev 12; Rebs: three players 5 Asts: Ilin 3		Pts: Youngblood 30; Rebs: Youngblood 8 Asts: Akl 4

Central South University of Forestry and Technology's gymnasium, Changsha
Referees: Ferdinand Pascual (PHI), Yuji Hirahara (JPN), Chun Yip Yuen (HKG)

== Second round ==
=== Group E ===
Pos	Team	Pld	W	L	PF	PA	PD	Pts	Qualification
1	Philippines	5	4	1	433	329	+104	9 (Note: Philippines–Iran 87–73)	Advance to final round
2	Iran	5	4	1	452	305	+147	9	Advance to final round
3	Japan	5	3	2	360	353	+7	8	Advance to final round
4	India	5	2	3	345	411	−66	7 (Note: Palestine–India 70–73)	Advance to final round
5	Palestine	5	2	3	345	393	−48	7	Proceed to classification round
6	Hong Kong	5	0	5	318	462	−144	5	Proceed to classification round

Source: FIBA
Rules for classification: 1) Points; 2) Head-to-head results; 3) Points difference; 4) Points scored; 5) Drawing of lots.
Notes:

27 September 2015
09:30

Boxscore

Iran	111–56	Hong Kong
Scoring by quarter: 24–16, 22–4, 28–24, 37–12
Pts: Jamshidi 22; Rebs: Haddadi, Sahakian 8 Asts: Mashayekhi 6		Pts: K. Lee 18; Rebs: C. Wong 7 Asts: Reid 6

Changsha Social Work College's gymnasium, Changsha
Referees: Mohammad Al-Amiri (KUW), Naser Abu Rashed (JOR), Chung Yi-chih (TPE)

27 September 2015
11:45

Boxscore

Palestine	70–73	India
Scoring by quarter: 17–19, 19–13, 11–17, 23–24
Pts: San. Sakakini 23; Rebs: San. Sakakini 12; Asts: Qahwash 9		Pts: Amj. Singh 32; Rebs: Amj. Singh 11; Asts: Bhriguvanshi 5

Changsha Social Work College's gymnasium, Changsha
Referees: Rabah Noujaim (LIB), Yevgeniy Mikheyev (KAZ), Peng Ling (CHN)

27 September 2015
16:45

Boxscore

Japan	66–73	Philippines
Scoring by quarter: 18–14, 15–21, 13–19, 20–19
Pts: Hiejima 17; Rebs: Takeuchi 11; Asts: four players 2		Pts: Blatche 18; Rebs: Blatche 10; Asts: William 4

Changsha Social Work College's gymnasium, Changsha
Referees: Marwan Egho (LIB), Harja Jaladri (INA), Victor Mah (SIN)

28 September 2015
09:30

Boxscore

India	76–71	Hong Kong
Scoring by quarter: 14–19, 20–20, 19–17, 23–15
Pts: Amj. Singh 26; Rebs: Amr. Singh 14; Asts: Bhriguvanshi 6		Pts: C. Wong 21; Rebs: C. Wong 10; Asts: W. Au-Yeng, S. Chan 3

Changsha Social Work College's gymnasium, Changsha
Referees: Rabah Noujaim (LIB), Anan Daraghma (PLE), Victor Mah (SIN)

28 September 2015
11:45

Boxscore

Philippines	87–73	Iran
Scoring by quarter: 22–25, 15–18, 28–17, 22–13
Pts: William 26; Rebs: De Ocampo 10; Asts: Norwood, William 3		Pts: Nikkhah Bahrami 21; Rebs: Sahakian 8 Asts: Kamrani 3

Changsha Social Work College's gymnasium, Changsha
Referees: Harja Jaladri (INA), Hwang In-tae (KOR), Yevgeniy Mikheuev (KAZ)

28 September 2015
14:30

Boxscore

Palestine	67–74	Japan
Scoring by quarter: 21–12, 16–24, 12–21, 18–17
Pts: San. Sakakini 27; Rebs: San. Sakakini 17; Asts: Qahwash 6		Pts: Takeuchi 21; Rebs: Takeuchi 19; Asts: Tabuse, Matsui 3

Changsha Social Work College's gymnasium, Changsha
Referees: Duan Zhu (CHN), Arsen Andryushkin (KAZ), Chen Ying-cheng (TPE)

29 September 2015
09:30

Boxscore

Palestine	48–94	Iran
Scoring by quarter: 14–17, 6–26, 11–28, 17–23
Pts: San. Sakakini 13; Rebs: Abu-Shamala 6 Asts: Qahwash 7		Pts: Kardoust 15; Rebs: Haddadi 11; Asts: Mashayekhi, Nikkhah Bahrami 3

Changsha Social Work College's gymnasium, Changsha
Referees: Rabah Noujaim (LIB), Arsen Andryushkin (KAZ), Chen Ying-cheng (TPE)

29 September 2015
11:45

Boxscore

Japan	89–62	Hong Kong
Scoring by quarter: 21–20, 19–12, 28–10, 21–20
Pts: Hiejima 19; Rebs: Takeuchi 8 Asts: Hiejima 4		Pts: C. Wong 14; Rebs: C. Wong 6 Asts: Reid 3

Changsha Social Work College's gymnasium, Changsha
Referees: Snehal Bendke (IND), Naser Abu Rashed (JOR), Chan Owe Shiong (MAS)

29 September 2015
14:30

Boxscore

Philippines	99–65	India
Scoring by quarter: 16–17, 26–19, 23–14, 34–15
Pts: Romeo 20; Rebs: Abueva, Intal 7 Asts: Intal, Romeo 4		Pts: Bhriguvanshi 21; Rebs: Amr. Singh 13; Asts: Bhriguvanshi, Amj. Singh 3

Changsha Social Work College's gymnasium, Changsha
Referees: Marwan Egho (LIB), Hwang In-tae (KOR), Peng Ling (CHN)

=== Group F ===
Pos	Team	Pld	W	L	PF	PA	PD	Pts	Qualification
1	China (H)	5	5	0	414	339	+75	10	Advance to final round
2	Qatar	5	3	2	391	411	−20	8 (Note: Qatar–South Korea 69–63)	Advance to final round
3	South Korea	5	3	2	387	339	+48	8	Advance to final round
4	Lebanon	5	2	3	414	411	+3	7 (Note: Lebanon–Jordan 80–76)	Advance to final round
5	Jordan	5	2	3	374	397	−23	7	Proceed to classification round
6	Kazakhstan	5	0	5	328	411	−83	5	Proceed to classification round

Source: FIBA
Rules for classification: 1) Points; 2) Head-to-head results; 3) Points difference; 4) Points scored; 5) Drawing of lots.
(H) Hosts
Notes:

27 September 2015
14:30

Boxscore

South Korea	85–71	Lebanon
Scoring by quarter: 13–23, 19–20, 26–15, 27–13
Pts: Yang 18; Rebs: Yang 6 Asts: Yang 8		Pts: Youngblood 21; Rebs: Bawji 12; Asts: Arakji 4

Changsha Social Work College's gymnasium, Changsha
Referees: Arsen Andryushkin (KAZ), Snehal Bendke (IND), Yuji Hirahara (JPN)

27 September 2015
19:30

Boxscore

China	75–62	Kazakhstan
Scoring by quarter: 23–14, 19–12, 19–19, 14–17
Pts: Yi 15; Rebs: Q. Zhou 11; Asts: Guo 3		Pts: Kolesnikov 14; Rebs: Kolesnikov 5 Asts: Johnson 4

Changsha Social Work College's gymnasium, Changsha
Referees: Ferdinand Pascual (PHI), Owe Shiong Chan (MAS), Amirhossein Safarzadeh (IRI)

27 September 2015
21:30

Boxscore

Qatar	73–84	Jordan
Scoring by quarter: 16–19, 20–14, 14–25, 23–26
Pts: Ali 20; Rebs: Ali 11; Asts: Johnson 5		Pts: Legion 22; Rebs: Abbas, Legion 8 Asts: Daghles 4

Changsha Social Work College's gymnasium, Changsha
Referees: Toru Katayose (JPN), Ricor Buaron (PHI), Chun Yip Yuen (HKG)

28 September 2015
16:45

Boxscore

Qatar	69–63	South Korea
Scoring by quarter: 13–17, 22–14, 13–19, 21–13
Pts: Mohd Mohamed 16; Rebs: three players 10; Asts: Johnson 4		Pts: S. Lee 19; Rebs: three players 6 Asts: Yang 4

Changsha Social Work College's gymnasium, Changsha
Referees: Ferdinand Pascual (PHI), Yuji Hirahara (JPN), Ceciline Victor (IND)

28 September 2015
19:30

Boxscore

Lebanon	72–90	China
Scoring by quarter: 17–24, 12–20, 21–21, 22–25
Pts: Bawji, Youngblood 14; Rebs: Bawji 7 Asts: Akl, Arakji 4		Pts: Yi 19; Rebs: Liu 7 Asts: three players 3

Changsha Social Work College's gymnasium, Changsha
Referees: Toru Katayose (JPN), Ricor Buaron (PHI), Amirhossein Safarzadeh (IRI)

28 September 2015
21:30

Boxscore

Jordan	87–73	Kazakhstan
Scoring by quarter: 15–17, 29–18, 27–24, 16–14
Pts: Legion 23; Rebs: Abbas 10; Asts: Legion 5		Pts: Johnson 26; Rebs: Ponomarev 13; Asts: Johnson 4

Changsha Social Work College's gymnasium, Changsha
Referees: Mohammad Al-Amiti (KUW), Chung Yi-chih (TPE), Chun Yip Yuen (HKG)

29 September 2015
16:45

Boxscore

Lebanon	80–76	Jordan
Scoring by quarter: 16–12, 29–18, 19–24, 16–22
Pts: Saoud 20; Rebs: Haidar 7 Asts: Youngblood 7		Pts: Legion 24; Rebs: Hussein 8 Asts: Abdeen 4

Changsha Social Work College's gymnasium, Changsha
Referees: Harja Jaladri (INA), Ricor Buaron (PHI), Amirhossein Safarzadeh (IRI)

29 September 2015
19:30

Boxscore

China	89–65	Qatar
Scoring by quarter: 26–17, 18–16, 26–15, 19–17
Pts: Q. Zhou 13; Rebs: Yi 9 Asts: Guo 3		Pts: Saad 14; Rebs: Saad 6 Asts: Saad 2

Changsha Social Work College's gymnasium, Changsha
Referees: Ferdinand Pascual (PHI), Anan Daraghma (PLE), Toru Katayose (JPN)

29 September 2015
21:30

Boxscore

South Korea	79–63	Kazakhstan
Scoring by quarter: 17–14, 12–18, 30–12, 20–19
Pts: T. Moon 16; Rebs: S. Lee 4 Asts: S. Lee 4		Pts: Klimov 22; Rebs: Ponomarev 7 Asts: Murzagaliyev 7

Changsha Social Work College's gymnasium, Changsha
Referees: Mohammad Alamiri (KUW), Yuji Hirahara (JPN), Chun Yip Yuen (HKG)

== Classification round ==
=== Classification 13th–16th ===
13th–16th place semifinals
27 September
Malaysia	61
Kuwait	83
27 September
Singapore	65
Chinese Taipei	111

13th place game
28 September
Kuwait	69
Chinese Taipei	99
15th place game
28 September
Malaysia	59
Singapore	92

==== 13th–16th place semifinals ====
27 September 2015
19:30

Boxscore

Malaysia	61–83	Kuwait
Scoring by quarter: 21–22, 12–18, 11–15, 17–28
Pts: Y.J. Kwaan 19; Rebs: Y.J. Kwaan 14; Asts: W.K. Tong 3		Pts: Hasan 26; Rebs: Hasan 9 Asts: Hasan 4

Central South University of Forestry and Technology's gymnasium, Changsha
Referees: Duan Zhu (CHN), Chen Ying-cheng (TPE), Wen Keming (CHN)

27 September 2015
21:30

Boxscore

Singapore	65–111	Chinese Taipei
Scoring by quarter: 14–22, 15–32, 16–35, 20–22
Pts: Ng 17; Rebs: Goh 8 Asts: Goh, Ng 3		Pts: Tien Lei 21; Rebs: Davis 12; Asts: four players 3

Central South University of Forestry and Technology's gymnasium, Changsha
Referees: Hwang In-tae (KOR), Atanu Banerjee (IND), Anan Daraghma (PLE)

==== 15th place game ====
28 September 2015
19:30

Boxscore

Malaysia	59–92	Singapore
Scoring by quarter: 13–18, 13–19, 12–27, 21–28
Pts: E.H. Soo 15; Rebs: Yeo 13; Asts: W.K. Tong 5		Pts: Lim S. 24; Rebs: Goh 18; Asts: W.L. Wong 5

Central South University of Forestry and Technology's gymnasium, Changsha
Referees: Marwan Egho (LIB), Atanu Banerjee (IND), Ye Nan (CHN)

==== 13th place game ====
28 September 2015
21:30

Boxscore

Kuwait	69–99	Chinese Taipei
Scoring by quarter: 16–23, 16–23, 21–23, 16–30
Pts: Hasan 26; Rebs: Al-Saeid 12; Asts: three players 2		Pts: Liu Cheng 17; Rebs: Davis 10; Asts: Chen Shih-chieh 9

Central South University of Forestry and Technology's gymnasium, Changsha
Referees: Naser Abu Rashed (JOR), Snehal Bendke (IND), Wen Keming (CHN)

=== Classification 9th–12th ===
9th–12th place semifinals
1 October
Palestine (OT)	83
Kazakhstan	81
1 October
Jordan	82
Hong Kong	62

Ninth place game
2 October
Palestine	82
Jordan	94
Eleventh place game
2 October
Kazakhstan	68
Hong Kong	62

==== 9th–12th place semifinals ====
1 October 2015
09:30

Boxscore

Hong Kong	62–82	Jordan
Scoring by quarter: 19–15, 9–21, 13–25, 21–21
Pts: Reid 14; Rebs: Reid 13; Asts: Xu 3		Pts: Legion 22; Rebs: Abbas 9 Asts: Al-Awadi 5

Changsha Social Work College's gymnasium, Changsha
Referees: Marwan Egho (LIB), Atanu Banerjee (IND), Chan Owe Shiong (MAS)

1 October 2015
11:45

Boxscore

Palestine	83–81 (OT)	Kazakhstan
Scoring by quarter: 14–17, 25–24, 10–16, 23–15, Overtime: 11–9
Pts: San. Sakakini 32; Rebs: San. Sakakini 18; Asts: Qahwash 8		Pts: Yargaliyev 26; Rebs: Zhigulin 10; Asts: Zhigulin 3

Changsha Social Work College's gymnasium, Changsha
Referees: Snehal Bendke (IND), Duan Zhu (CHN), Victor Min De Mah (SIN)

==== Eleventh place game ====
2 October 2015
09:30

Boxscore

Hong Kong	62–68	Kazakhstan
Scoring by quarter: 7–12, 20–18, 20–20, 15–18
Pts: C. Wong 23; Rebs: Reid 7 Asts: S. Chan 4		Pts: Ilin 29; Rebs: Ponomarev 11; Asts: Ponomarev 2

Central South University of Forestry and Technology's gymnasium, Changsha
Referees: Mohammad Al-Amiri (KUW), Ricor Buaron (PHI), Chan Owe Shiong (MAS)

==== Ninth place game ====
2 October 2015
11:45

Boxscore

Jordan	94–82	Palestine
Scoring by quarter: 26–19, 25–18, 20–24, 23–21
Pts: Hussein 26; Rebs: Abbas 11; Asts: Legion 5		Pts: Abu-Shamala 24; Rebs: San. Sakakini 10; Asts: Qahwash 5

Central South University of Forestry and Technology's gymnasium, Changsha
Referees: Ferdinand Pascual (PHI), Chung Yi-chih (TPE), Ye Nan (CHN)

== Final round ==
=== Bracket ===
Fifth place
F4	Lebanon	88
F3	South Korea	87
Seventh place
F2	Qatar	84
E4	India	58

Consolation semifinals
F4	Lebanon	89
F2	Qatar	86
E4	India	72
F3	South Korea	117

Quarterfinals
E1	Philippines	82
F4	Lebanon	70
F2	Qatar	67
E3	Japan	81
F1	China	104
E4	India	58
E2	Iran	75
F3	South Korea	62

Semifinals
E1	Philippines	81
E3	Japan	70
F1	China	70
E2	Iran	57

Final
E1	Philippines	67
F1	China	78
Third place
E3	Japan	63
E2	Iran	68

=== Quarterfinals ===
1 October 2015
14:30

Boxscore

Iran	75–62	South Korea
Scoring by quarter: 23–8, 13–17, 24–19, 15–18
Pts: Haddadi 18; Rebs: Haddadi 14; Asts: Kamrani 5		Pts: J. Kim, Moon 10; Rebs: Moon 5 Asts: three players 3

Changsha Social Work College's gymnasium, Changsha
Referees: Ferdinand Pascual (PHI), Arsen Andryuhskin (KAZ), Toru Katayose (JPN)

1 October 2015
16:45

Boxscore

Japan	81–67	Qatar
Scoring by quarter: 28–13, 18–19, 17–18, 18–17
Pts: Furukawa 22; Rebs: Takeuchi 8 Asts: Tabuse 6		Pts: Johnson 16; Rebs: Mohamed 8 Asts: Mohamed 7

Changsha Social Work College's gymnasium, Changsha
Referees: Harja Jaladri (INA), Hwang In-tae (KOR), Amirhossein Safarzadeh (IRI)

1 October 2015
19:30

Boxscore

India	58–104	China
Scoring by quarter: 15–27, 14–29, 11–19, 18–29
Pts: Bhriguvanshi 13; Rebs: Amr. Singh 5 Asts: Bhriguvanshi 6		Pts: Yi 21; Rebs: Yi 7 Asts: J. Zhao 3

Changsha Social Work College's gymnasium, Changsha
Referees: Rabah Noujaim (LIB), Ricor Buaron (PHI), Yuji Hirahara (JPN)

1 October 2015
21:30

Boxscore

Philippines	82–70	Lebanon
Scoring by quarter: 20–16, 17–16, 20–17, 25–21
Pts: William 25; Rebs: Blatche 17; Asts: Blatche 3		Pts: Haidar 18; Rebs: Bawji 13; Asts: Youngblood 5

Changsha Social Work College's gymnasium, Changsha
Referees: Mohammad Al-Amiri (KUW), Naser Abu Rashed (JOR), Yevgeniy Mikheyev (KAZ)

=== 5th–8th place semifinals ===
2 October 2015
14:30

Boxscore

India	72–117	South Korea
Scoring by quarter: 21–29, 14–30, 15–30, 22–28
Pts: Amj. Singh 24; Rebs: Amr. Singh 6 Asts: Amj. Singh 3		Pts: T. Moon 22; Rebs: J. Kim 10; Asts: T. Kim 12

Changsha Social Work College's gymnasium, Changsha
Referees: Yuji Hirahara (JPN), Peng Ling (CHN), Amirhossein Safarzadeh (IRI)

2 October 2015
16:45

Boxscore

Qatar	86–89	Lebanon
Scoring by quarter: 17–17, 23–22, 23–26, 23–24
Pts: Johnson 29; Rebs: Johnson 10; Asts: Johnson 6		Pts: Arakji 21; Rebs: Bawji 6 Asts: Arakji 5

Changsha Social Work College's gymnasium, Changsha
Referees: Toru Katayose (JPN), Arsen Andryushkin (KAZ), Chun Yip Yuen (HKG)

=== Semifinals ===
2 October 2015
19:30

Boxscore

China	70–57	Iran
Scoring by quarter: 21–12, 18–17, 19–15, 12–13
Pts: Yi 13; Rebs: Yi 8 Asts: Guo 6		Pts: Nikkhah Bahrami 18; Rebs: Haddadi 11; Asts: Kamrani, Mashayekhi 1

Changsha Social Work College's gymnasium, Changsha
Referees: Marwan Egho (LIB), Rabah Noujaim (LIB), Ceciline Vincent (IND)

2 October 2015
22:00

Boxscore

Japan	70–81	Philippines
Scoring by quarter: 17–16, 22–23, 15–15, 16–27
Pts: Hiejima 28; Rebs: Takeuchi 16; Asts: Hiejima 2		Pts: Blatche 22; Rebs: Blatche 13; Asts: William 7

Changsha Social Work College's gymnasium, Changsha
Referees: Yevgeniy Mikheyev (KAZ), Arsen Andryuhskin (KAZ), Snehal Bendke (IND)

=== Seventh place game ===
3 October 2015
13:30

Boxscore

India	58–84	Qatar
Scoring by quarter: 14–23, 16–28, 16–18, 12–15
Pts: Amj. Singh 21; Rebs: Arumugam 9 Asts: Bhriguvanshi 7		Pts: Mohamed M.H 28; Rebs: Matalkeh 9 Asts: Mohamed M.H 6

Changsha Social Work College's gymnasium, Changsha
Referees: Ferdinand Pascual (PHI), Yevgeniy Mikheyev (KAZ), Nan Ye (CHN)

=== Fifth place game ===
3 October 2015
15:45

Boxscore

South Korea	87–88	Lebanon
Scoring by quarter: 20–23, 18–26, 25–15, 24–24
Pts: Cho, J Kim 16; Rebs: J. Kim 12; Asts: T. Kim 5		Pts: Bawji 28; Rebs: Bawji 12; Asts: Arakji 6

Changsha Social Work College's gymnasium, Changsha
Referees: Mohammad Al-Amiri (KUW), Harja Jaladri (INA), Amirhossein Safarzadeh (IRI)

=== Third place game ===
3 October 2015
18:00

Boxscore

Iran	68–63	Japan
Scoring by quarter: 22–10, 9–19, 13–19, 24–15
Pts: Nikkhah Bahrami 35; Rebs: Haddadi 7 Asts: Haddadi 5		Pts: Matsui 18; Rebs: Takeuchi 10; Asts: Hiejima 4

Changsha Social Work College's gymnasium, Changsha
Referees: Rabah Noujaim (LIB), Duan Zhu (CHN), Hwang In-tae (KOR)

=== Final ===
3 October 2015
20:30

Boxscore

China	78–67	Philippines
Scoring by quarter: 23–19, 23–16, 14–15, 18–17
Pts: Guo 19; Rebs: Yi 15; Asts: Ding 3		Pts: Blatche 17; Rebs: William 6 Asts: Romeo 3

Changsha Social Work College's gymnasium, Changsha
Referees: Marwan Egho (LIB), Arsen Andryuhskin (KAZ), Toru Katayose (JPN)

== Final standings ==
Qualified for the Olympics
Qualify to Final Olympic Qualifying Tournament as host.
Qualify to Final Olympic Qualifying Tournament

Rank	Team	Record	FIBA World Rankings		
Rank	Team	Record	Before	After	Change
1st place, gold medalist(s)	China	9–0	14	14	0
2nd place, silver medalist(s)	Philippines	7–2	31	28	3
3rd place, bronze medalist(s)	Iran	7–2	17	17	0
4th	Japan	5–4	47	T-48	−1
5th	Lebanon	5–4	34	43	−9
6th	South Korea	5–4	28	30	−2
7th	Qatar	4–5	48	50	−2
8th	India	3–6	61	T-53	8
9th	Jordan	5–3	29	29	0
10th	Palestine	4–4	NR	75	13
11th	Kazakhstan	2–6	53	56	−3
12th	Hong Kong	1–7	69	T-65	4
13th	Chinese Taipei	3–2	44	T-48	−4
14th	Kuwait	1–4	70	69	1
15th	Singapore	1–4	NR	T-82	6
16th	Malaysia	0–5	T-71	67	4

== Awards ==
2015 Asian champions

China
16th title

- Most Valuable Player: (China) Yi Jianlian
- All-Star Team:
  - PG – (Philippines) Jayson William
  - SG – (China) Guo Ailun
  - SF – (Iran) Samad Nikkhah Bahrami
  - PF – (China) Yi Jianlian
  - C – (China) Zhou Qi

== Statistical leaders ==
=== Player tournament averages ===
Points

Pos.	Name	PPG
1	(Palestine) Sani Sakakini	22.4
2	(Palestine) Jamal Abu-Shamala	21.5
3	(Qatar) Trey Johnson	21.1
4	(India) Amjyot Singh	20.9
5	(Philippines) Andray Blatche	17.8
6	(Lebanon) Jay Youngblood	17.4
7	(Jordan) Alex Legion	17.3
8	(Philippines) Jayson William	16.7
8	(China) Yi Jianlian	16.7
10	(Japan) Makoto Hiejima	15.9

Rebounds

Pos.	Name	RPG
1	(Palestine) Sani Sakakini	12.6
2	(Japan) Joji Takeuchi	11.9
3	(Singapore) Delvin Goh	10.4
4	(Kazakhstan) Anton Ponomarev	9.4
5	(Philippines) Andray Blatche	9.2
5	(Chinese Taipei) Quincy Davis	9.2
7	(China) Yi Jianlian	8.8
8	(Palestine) Jamal Abu-Shamala	8.5
9	(India) Amjyot Singh	8.3
9	(Jordan) Zaid Abbas	8.3

Assists

Pos.	Name	APG
1	(Palestine) Imad Qahwash	6.0
2	(India) Vishesh Bhriguvanshi	4.8
3	(South Korea) Yang Dong-geun	5.7
4	(Kazakhstan) Jerry Johnson	4.5
5	(China) Guo Ailun	4.0
6	(Chinese Taipei) Chen Shih-chieh	3.6
6	(Lebanon) Wael Arakji	3.6
8	(Qatar) Trey Johnson	3.3
9	(Japan) Makoto Hiejima	3.2
9	(South Korea) Kim Tae-sul	3.2

Steals

Pos.	Name	SPG
1	(South Korea) Yang Dong-geun	2.4
2	(South Korea) Cho Sung-min	2.3
3	(Iran) Mehdi Kamrani	2.0
3	(Jordan) Zaid Abbas	2.0
5	(Jordan) Alex Legion	1.9
6	(Chinese Taipei) Liu Cheng	1.8
7	(India) Vishesh Bhriguvanshi	1.78
7	(Japan) Makoto Hiejima	1.78
9	(Palestine) Jamal Abu-Shamala	1.75
9	(Palestine) Imad Qahwash	1.75

Blocks

Pos.	Name	BPG
1	(Chinese Taipei) Quincy Davis	2.2
2	(China) Zhou Qi	2
3	(South Korea) Lee Jong-hyun	1.9
4	(Jordan) Ali Jamal Zaghab	1.4
5	(China) Yi Jianlian	1.2
6	(Lebanon) Ali Haidar	1.13
7	(India) Amjyot Singh	1.11
7	(Lebanon) Bassel Bawji	1.11
7	(Philippines) Andray Blatche	1.11
10	(Iran) Hamed Haddadi	1
10	(Hong Kong) Duncan Reid	1
10	(Kuwait) Abdulrahman Aljuma'h	1
10	(Singapore) Delvin Goh	1

Other statistical leaders

Stat	Name	Avg.
Field goal percentage	(Chinese Taipei) Quincy Davis	65.0%
3-point FG percentage	(Chinese Taipei) Lu Cheng-ju	55.2%
Free throw percentage	(Kazakhstan) Jerry Johnson	88.5%
Turnovers	(India) Amjyot Singh	5.3
Fouls	(Kazakhstan) Alexandr Zhigulin (Kuwait) Abdulrahman Aljuma'h (Malaysia) Wei Hong Choo	4

=== Team tournament averages ===
Points

Pos.	Name	PPG
1	Chinese Taipei	88.4
2	Iran	86.0
3	Philippines	85.9
4	China	84.1
5	Lebanon	83.7

Rebounds

Pos.	Name	RPG
1	Iran	46.9
2	Philippines	46.44
3	Palestine	46.38
4	Chinese Taipei	43.4
5	Qatar	43.1

Assists

Pos.	Name	APG
1	South Korea	19.7
2	Chinese Taipei	17.2
3	Iran	15.3
4	China	14.8
5	Japan	14.1

Steals

Pos.	Name	SPG
1	Iran	11.3
2	South Korea	9.7
3	Chinese Taipei	9.4
4	Philippines	8.9
5	Jordan	8.4

Blocks

Pos.	Name	BPG
1	China	4.9
2	Lebanon	3.6
3	Chinese Taipei	3.4
4	Philippines	3.2
5	South Korea	3.1

=== Tournament game highs ===
Category	Player game high	Total	Opponent (date)	Team game high	Total	Opponent (date)
Points
Points	(Iran) Samad Nikkhah Bahrami	35	Japan (3 October)	Iran	122	Malaysia (25 September)
Rebounds	(Japan) Joji Takeuchi	19	India (25 September); Palestine (28 September)	Iran	64	Malaysia (25 September)
Assists	(South Korea) Kim Tae-sul	12	India (2 October)	South Korea	33	India (2 October)
Steals	(South Korea) Yang Dong-geun	8	Lebanon (27 September)	Japan	20	Malaysia (24 September)
Blocks	(South Korea) Lee Jong-hyun (China) Zhou Qi (China) Yi Jianlian	4	Singapore (25 September); Lebanon (28 September); Iran (2 October)	China	8	Singapore (25 September); Iran (2 October)

== Controversies ==
=== Rescheduling of Semifinals ===
There was suspicion and outrage when the organizers decided to move the schedule of the semifinals game between Philippines and Japan from its original schedule of 9:30 p.m. to 10 p.m. Many fans believe that this move was a way for the Chinese to procure undue advantage come the gold medal match.

=== Finals Pregame ===
A few hours before the championship match, Samahang Basketbol ng Pilipinas President Manuel V. Pangilinan accused the host country of pulling off shenanigans. He twittered that the delay of the tournament electric bus to bring the Philippine squad to the game venue as it was not charged would give them less time to warm up. He claimed the SBP were not allocated tickets by the Local Organizing Committee (LOC), so the Philippine squad coaching staff and SBP officials were without tickets hours prior to the game although it was standard practice. He also cited that the Chinese players stayed at a different hotel from the players from the other nations, which violates the FIBA rules. It was also reported that when the Philippine squad finally arrived at the arena, the goal's net where they were shooting was suddenly removed for repair, which gave them even less time to warm up after the delay from the electric bus incident.

=== Officiating ===
The officiating of the referees were also held in question by fans and various teams playing against China, especially the games with Jordan, South Korea, Iran and the Philippines.

=== Behavioural issues ===
There was wide criticism of the rude behavior of the Chinese fans were shouting threats towards visiting teams, doing the dirty finger and throwing bottles and paper at the opposing team benches. There were incidents in which foreign fans in the venue were heckled and insulted by Chinese fans while the Chinese Police just stood by. One particular moment was when Calvin Abueva irritated Chinese supporters after he accidentally bumped Guo Ailun with his shoulder while returning to the bench following his fifth and final personal foul. There was a report that a Filipino cameraman got involved in a verbal exchange with a Chinese cameraman. Filipino veteran sportswriter Quinito Henson added that a Chinese photographer had to be restrained from scuffling with a Filipino lensman for shielding Abueva from crowd abuse.

== Referees ==
The following referees were selected for the tournament.

- (China) Duan Zhu
- (China) Peng Ling
- (China) Wen Keming
- (China) Ye Nan
- (Hong Kong) Yuen Chun Yip
- (Indonesia) Harja Jaladri
- (India) Atanu Banerjee
- (India) Snehal Bendke
- (India) Ceciline Vincent
- (Iran) Amirhossein Safarzadeh
- (Jordan) Naser Abu Rashed
- (Japan) Yuji Hirahara
- (Japan) Toru Katayose
- (Kazakhstan) Arsen Andryushkin
- (Kazakhstan) Yevgeniy Mikheyev
- (South Korea) Hwang In-tae
- (Kuwait) Mohammad Al-Amiri
- (Lebanon) Marwan Egho
- (Lebanon) Rabah Noujaim
- (Malaysia) Chan Owe Shiong
- (Philippines) Ricor Buaron
- (Philippines) Ferdinand Pascual
- (Palestine) Anan Daraghma
- (Singapore) Victor Mah
- (Chinese Taipei) Chen Ying-cheng
- (Chinese Taipei) Chung Yi-chih
