= 2016 SEABA Cup =

Basketball tournament

2016 SEABA Stanković Cup
5th Stanković Qualifying

Tournament details
- Host country: Thailand
- Dates: 22–28 May
- Teams: 5
- Venue(s): 1 (in 1 host city)

Final positions
- Champions: Philippines (2nd title)

Tournament statistics
- Top scorer: (Philippines) Rosario (13.8)
- Top rebounds: (Singapore) Goh (10.8)
- Top assists: (Philippines) Jalalon (3.4) (Philippines) Tolomia
- PPG (Team): Philippines (87.0)
- RPG (Team): Philippines (51.8)
- APG (Team): Philippines (12.4)

The 2016 SEABA Cup was the qualifying event in the SEABA for the 2016 FIBA Asia Challenge. The fifth edition of the games took place from 22 May to 28 May 2016 in Bangkok, Thailand.

Automatically, only one spot was allotted for SEABA but due to the Philippines' runner-up finish in the 2015 FIBA Asia Championship, the subzone was awarded another slot, thus SEABA had two spots which was contested by five SEABA teams.

The Philippines won their second tournament title by defeating the hosts Thailand in the championship match, 97–80. However, both teams were already qualified to the main tournament as of 25 May due to their top two finish in the elimination round.

== Standings ==
Pos	Team	Pld	W	L	PF	PA	PD	Pts	Qualification
1	Philippines	4	4	0	338	260	+78	8	Advance to the finals and to the 2016 FIBA Asia Challenge
2	Thailand (H)	4	3	1	319	204	+115	7	Advance to the finals and to the 2016 FIBA Asia Challenge
3	Singapore	4	2	2	210	256	−46	6	Advance to the third place battle
4	Malaysia	4	1	3	279	303	−24	5	Advance to the third place battle
5	Indonesia	4	0	4	185	308	−123	4	Eliminated

Rules for classification: (1) Tournament points, (2) Head-to-head tournament points, (3) Head-to-head goal average, (4) Overall goal average, (5) Drawing of lots
(H) Hosts

== Round-robin results ==
All times are in Thailand Standard Time (UTC+07:00)

22 May
15:00

Stats

Thailand	89–44	Indonesia
Scoring by quarter: 26–15, 24–6, 19–11, 20–12
Pts: Jaisanuk, Ananti, Towaroj 13; Rebs: Ghogar 13; Asts: Apiromvilaichai 4		Pts: Surliyadin 13; Rebs: Wardana 10; Asts: Sugianto 2

Stadium 29, Bangkok
Referees: Yu Jung (TPE), Ricor Buaron (PHI), Wu Xin (SIN)

22 May
17:30

Stats

Philippines	108–84	Malaysia
Scoring by quarter: 29–20, 23–20, 28–20, 28–24
Pts: Rosario 19; Rebs: Jose 15; Asts: Tolomia 4		Pts: Wong Y.H. 22; Rebs: Kwaan Y.J. 11; Asts: Kwaan Y.J. 4

Stadium 29, Bangkok
Referees: Ceciline Michael Vino Vincent Francis Victor (IND), Harja Jaladri (INA), Preeda Muongmee (THA)

23 May
16:00

Stats

Indonesia	40–62	Singapore
Scoring by quarter: 3–14, 9–22, 14–20, 14–6
Pts: Surliyadin 18; Rebs: Surliyadin 9 Asts: four players 1 each		Pts: Lim S. 24; Rebs: Lim S., Goh 12; Asts: Toh Q.H., Lim S., Tan 2

Stadium 29, Bangkok
Referees: Ceciline Michael Vino Vincent Francis Victor (IND), Ting Pick Kieng (MAS), Suebpong Wichaiphin (THA)

23 May
18:30

Stats

Malaysia	66–85	Thailand
Scoring by quarter: 18–24, 7–24, 23–24, 18–13
Pts: Kwaan Y.J. 20; Rebs: Yeo 8 Asts: Ma C.K. 3		Pts: Jaisanuk 18; Rebs: Apiromvilaichai 12; Asts: Lakhan 3

Stadium 29, Bangkok
Referees: Yu Jung (TPE), Harja Jaladri (INA), Wu Xin (SIN)

24 May
16:00

Stats

Singapore	59–81	Philippines
Scoring by quarter: 14–27, 15–14, 12–18, 18–22
Pts: Goh 17; Rebs: Toh Q.H. 9 Asts: Goh 3		Pts: Jalalon 17; Rebs: Jose, Rosario 9 Asts: Rosario, Tolomia 4

Stadium 29, Bangkok
Referees: Yu Jung (TPE), Suebpong Wichaiphin (THA), Ting Pick Kieng (MAS)

24 May
18:30

Stats

Indonesia	49–74	Malaysia
Scoring by quarter: 12–15, 9–19, 17–27, 11–13
Pts: Tuasela 17; Rebs: Maryono 9 Asts: four players 1 each		Pts: Wong Y.H. 24; Rebs: Yeo 12; Asts: Kwaan Y.J., Ma C.K. 2

Stadium 29, Bangkok
Referees: Ceciline Michael Vino Vincent Francis Victor (IND), Preeda Muongmee (THA), Ricor Buaron (PHI)

25 May
16:00

Stats

Philippines	83–52	Indonesia
Scoring by quarter: 25–16, 16–10, 19–17, 23–9
Pts: Pogoy, Tolomia 12; Rebs: Holmqvist, Rosario 9 Asts: Jalalon, Tolomia 7		Pts: Surliyadin 12; Rebs: Wardana 9 Asts: Surliyadin 5

Stadium 29, Bangkok
Referees: Ceciline Michael Vino Vincent Francis Victor (IND), Wu Xin (SIN), Suebpong Wichaiphin (THA)

25 May
18:30

Stats

Thailand	80–28	Singapore
Scoring by quarter: 28–7, 14–3, 19–4, 19–14
Pts: Jaisanuk 12; Rebs: Chanthachon, Ghogar 10; Asts: Samerjai, Sekteera, Lakhan 2		Pts: J. Lim 7 Rebs: K. Lim 10; Asts: Chia, Goh 1

Stadium 29, Bangkok
Referees: Yu Jung (TPE), Ting Pick Kieng (MAS), Harja Jaladri (INA)

26 May
16:00

Stats

Singapore	61–55	Malaysia
Scoring by quarter: 16–18, 12–15, 15–16, 18–6
Pts: Kwek 15; Rebs: Goh 15; Asts: Toh Q.H. 2		Pts: Kwaan Y.J. 19; Rebs: Kuek T.Y. 10; Asts: Gan H.H. 4

Stadium 29, Bangkok
Referees: Yu Jung (TPE), Ricor Buaron (PHI), Preeda Muongmee (THA)

26 May
18:30

Stats

Thailand	65–66	Philippines
Scoring by quarter: 12–21, 21–11, 15–17, 17–17
Pts: Ananti 14; Rebs: Chanthachon 13; Asts: Chanthachon, Samerjai 2		Pts: Rosario 20; Rebs: Jose 12; Asts: Jalalon 3

Stadium 29, Bangkok
Referees: Ceciline Michael Vino Vincent Francis Victor (IND), Harja Jaladri (INA), Ting Pick Kieng (MAS)

== Final round ==
Top two teams qualify to the 2016 FIBA Asia Challenge.

=== Third place game ===
28 May
13:00

Stats

Malaysia	62–68	Singapore
Scoring by quarter: 11–18, 16–11, 14–18, 21–21
Pts: Ma C.K. 14; Rebs: Kuek T.Y. 8 Asts: Kwaan Y.J. 4		Pts: Goh 20; Rebs: Goh 16; Asts: Goh 5

Stadium 29, Bangkok
Referees: Harja Jaladri (INA), Ricor Buaron (PHI), Suebpong Wichaiphin (THA)

=== Final ===
28 May
15:00

Stats

Thailand	80–97	Philippines
Scoring by quarter: 22–22, 23–27, 17–18, 18–30
Pts: Ananti 19; Rebs: Chanthachon 8 Asts: Samerjai 4		Pts: Rosario 17; Rebs: four players 7 each Asts: Jalalon, Rosario 3

Stadium 29, Bangkok
Referees: Yu Jung (TPE), Ceciline Michael Vino Vincent Francis Victor (IND), Wu Xin (SIN)

== Final standings ==
Qualified for the 2016 FIBA Asia Challenge

Rank	Team
1st place, gold medalist(s)	Philippines
2nd place, silver medalist(s)	Thailand
3rd place, bronze medalist(s)	Singapore
4	Malaysia
5	Indonesia

== Awards ==
2016 SEABA Cup champions

Philippines
Second title
