= 2012 SEABA Under-18 Championship =

Qualifying tournament for Southeast Asia Basketball

2012 SEABA U-18 Championship
8th Southeast Asian Basketball Championship
- Official logo of the 2012 SEABA Under-18 Championship

Tournament details
- Host country: Singapore
- Dates: June 26–30
- Teams: 5
- Venue(s): 1 (in 1 host city)

Final positions
- Champions: Philippines (6th title)

Tournament statistics
- Top scorer: (Singapore) Goh (16.3)
- Top rebounds: (Singapore) Goh (9.0)
- Top assists: (Singapore) Thng J.R. (3.8)
- PPG (Team): Philippines (91.0)
- RPG (Team): Indonesia (53.8)
- APG (Team): Philippines (17.5)

The 2012 SEABA Under-18 Championship was the qualifying tournament for Southeast Asia Basketball Association at the 2012 FIBA Asia Under-18 Championship. The tournament was held in Singapore from June 26 to June 30. The Philippines successfully defended their title by sweeping all of their assignments to earn right to represent SEABA together with Indonesia and Singapore.

== Round robin ==
Qualified for the 2012 FIBA Asia Under-18 Championship

Team	Pld	W	L	PF	PA	PD
Philippines	4	4	0	364	213	151
Indonesia	4	3	1	270	228	42
Singapore	4	2	2	304	204	100
Malaysia	4	1	3	311	293	18
Laos	4	0	4	131	442	-311

June 26
17:30

Report

Malaysia	73–81	Indonesia
Scoring by quarter: 15–15, 19–26, 16–16, 23–24
Pts: Sim Y.W. 13; Rebs: Tong J.X. 11; Asts: Liew K.H. 2		Pts: Andriano 17; Rebs: Panagan 10; Asts: Panagan, Dei 2

Singapore Basketball Centre, Singapore
Referees: Huang Yi-Chi (TPE), Tang Wei Kok (SIN), Mikeo Thongpathoum (LAO)

June 26
20:00

Report

Singapore	123–19	Laos
Scoring by quarter: 30-7, 31-4, 30-6, 32-2
Pts: Low W.H. 18; Rebs: Tay D.L. 11; Asts: Thng J.R. 8		Pts: Vongmeleuth 6 Rebs: Phengnalath 5 Asts: Sengthong 1

Singapore Basketball Centre, Singapore
Referees: Thongcai Thaweewutsophon (THA), Dwi Cahyo Kartiko (INA), Yen Sin Tee (SIN)

June 27
18:00

Box Scores

Laos	28–124	Philippines
Scoring by quarter: 10-34, 2-30, 7-29, 9-31
Pts: Phommasone 10; Rebs: Champakeo 5 Asts: Sengthong, Phommasone 1		Pts: Bonleon 24; Rebs: Lao 15; Asts: Bonleon 6

Singapore Basketball Centre, Singapore
Referees: Dwi Cahyo Kartiko (INA), Yen Sin Tee (SIN), Tang Wei Kok (SIN)

June 27
20:00

Box Scores

Indonesia	54–43	Singapore
Scoring by quarter: 11-11, 9-15, 17-9, 17-8
Pts: Kokodiputra 17; Rebs: Kokodiputra 14; Asts: Panagan 2		Pts: Goh 16; Rebs: Goh 14; Asts: Thng J.R. 2

Singapore Basketball Centre, Singapore
Referees: Huang Yi-Chi (TPE), Thongcai Thaweewutsophon (THA), Joenard Garcia (PHI)

June 28
18:00

Box Scores

Malaysia	117–53	Laos
Scoring by quarter: 31-8, 26-13, 35-11, 25-21
Pts: Loo L.W. 19; Rebs: Ng C.T. 11; Asts: Liew K.H. 5		Pts: Sengthong 16; Rebs: Sengthong 7 Asts: Phommasone 5

Singapore Basketball Centre, Singapore
Referees: Thongcai Thaweewutsophon (THA), Goh Poh Seng (SIN), Joenard Garcia (PHI)

June 28
20:00

Box Scores

Singapore	63–75	Philippines
Scoring by quarter: 13-16, 17-19, 22-20, 11-20
Pts: Goh 17; Rebs: Thng J.R., Goh 7 Asts: Goh 5		Pts: Alejandro 13; Rebs: Javelosa 8 Asts: Rivero 4

Singapore Basketball Centre, Singapore
Referees: Huang Yi-Chi (TPE), Dwi Cahyo Kartiko (INA), Mikeo Thongpathoum (LAO)

June 29
18:00

Box Scores

Laos	31–78	Indonesia
Scoring by quarter: 10-17, 2-21, 12-23, 7-17
Pts: Phannoloth 15; Rebs: Sengthong 12; Asts: Sengthong 3		Pts: Liem 16; Rebs: Liem 13; Asts: Abraham 4

Singapore Basketball Centre, Singapore
Referees: Yen Sin Tee (SIN), Joenard Garcia (PHI), Tang Wei Kok (SIN)

June 29
20:00

Box Scores

Philippines	84–65	Malaysia
Scoring by quarter: 25-22, 18-20, 25-15, 16-8
Pts: Bonleon 16; Rebs: Javelosa 14; Asts: Morada 3		Pts: Liew K.H. 11; Rebs: Ng C.T. 7 Asts: Liew K.H. 3

Singapore Basketball Centre, Singapore
Referees: Huang Yi-Chi (TPE), Wong Hwee Liak (SIN), Thongcai Thaweewutsophon (THA)

June 30
15:00

Report

Indonesia	57–81	Philippines
Scoring by quarter: 15-22, 13-12, 21-27, 8-20
Pts: Panagan 13; Rebs: Sitorus 9 Asts: 6 players 1		Pts: Alejandro 18; Rebs: Suarez 9 Asts: Nambatac 18

Singapore Basketball Centre, Singapore
Referees: Wong Hwee Liak (SIN), Yen Sin Tee (SIN), Mikeo Thongpathouum (LAO)

June 30
17:00

Report

Malaysia	56–75	Singapore
Scoring by quarter: 11-14, 13-13, 15-29, 17-19
Pts: 3 players 8 Rebs: Ng C.T. 7 Asts: Sim Y.W. 3		Pts: Goh 20; Rebs: Goh 10; Asts: Thng J.R., Ng J.L. 3

Singapore Basketball Centre, Singapore
Referees: Huang Yi-Chi (TPE), Thongcai Thaweewutsophon (THA), Dwi Cahyo Kartiko (INA)

== Final standings ==
Rank	Team
Gold medal	Philippines
Silver medal	Indonesia
Bronze medal	Singapore
4	Malaysia
5	Laos

== Awards ==
2012 SEABA Under-18 champions

Philippines
Sixth title
