= Sani Sakakini =

Palestinian basketball player

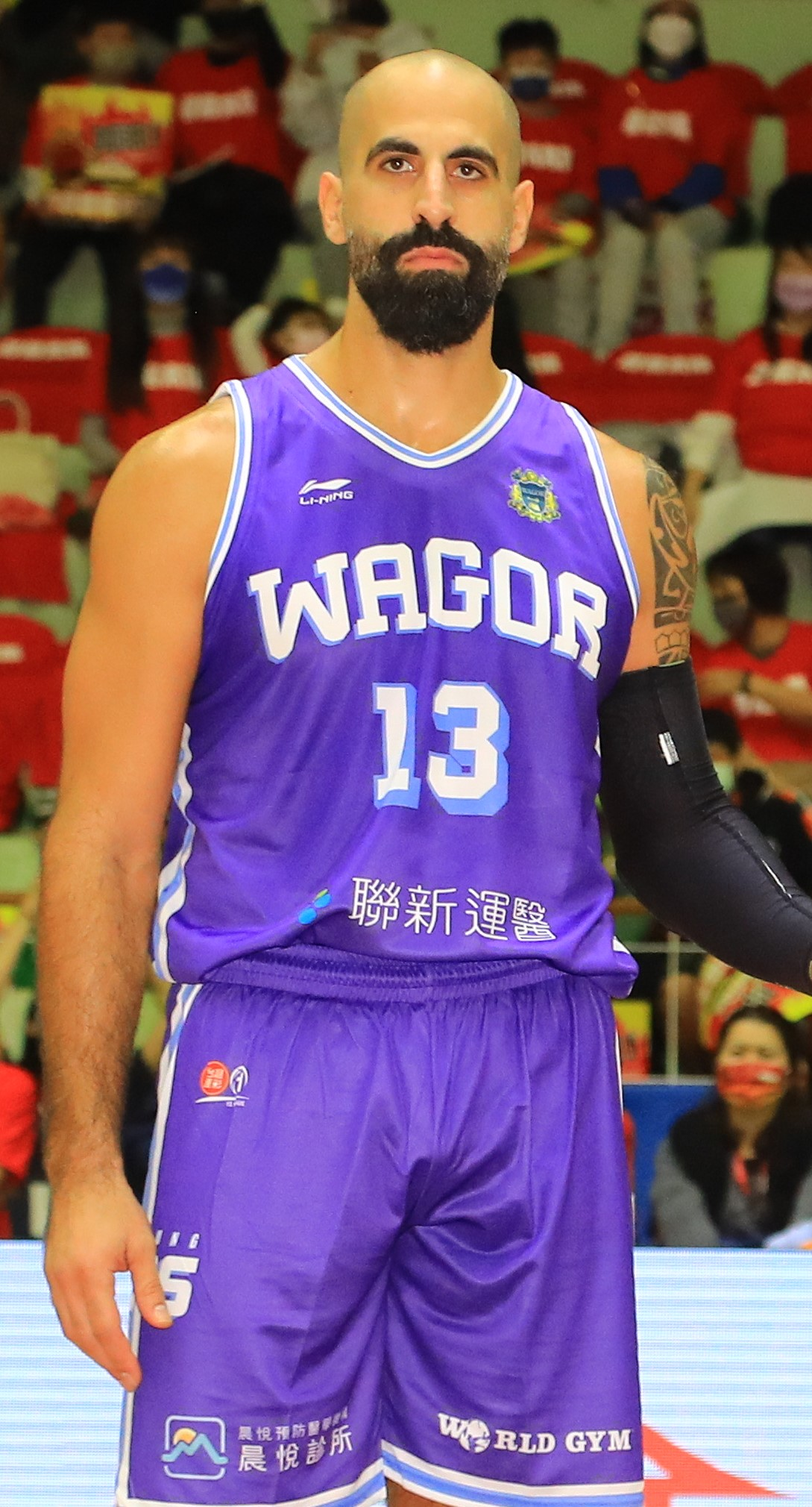

No. 13 – Kuwait SC
- Position: Power forward
- League: WASL; Kuwaiti League

Personal information
- Born: August 19, 1988 (age 38) Ramallah, Palestine
- Listed height: 2.04 m (6 ft 8 in)
- Listed weight: 102 kg (225 lb)

Career information
- NBA draft: 2010: undrafted
- Playing career: 2007–present

Career history
- 2007–2013: Al Riyadi Amman
- 2011: →Guangzhou Free Man
- 2011–2012: Qingdao DoubleStar Eagles
- 2013: →Sarriyet Ramallah
- 2013–2014: Qingdao DoubleStar Eagles
- 2014: →Hoops Club
- 2015: Orthodox (Jordan)
- 2015–2016: Jiangsu Tongxi
- 2016: →Champville SC
- 2016–2017: Tianjin Ronggang
- 2017: Trotamundos de Carabobo
- 2017–2018: Guangzhou Long-Lions
- 2018: Shabab Al Ahli
- 2018: Trotamundos de Carabobo
- 2018–2019: Yulon Luxgen Dinos
- 2019–2020: Beijing Royal Fighters
- 2021: Orthodoxi Beit Sahour
- 2021–2022: Taichung Wagor Suns
- 2022–2023: Taoyuan Pilots
- 2023–2024: Al Riyadi Beirut
- 2024–2025: New Taipei Kings
- 2026–present: Kuwait

Career highlights
- TPBL champion (2025); Arab Club Championship winner (2022); All-T1 League First Team (2022); All-Jordanian League 1st Team (2010, 2013); All-Jordanian League Center (2013); Palestinian Basketball League champion (2013, 2021); All-Chinese CBA 3rd Team (2014); Jordanian League champion (2015); All-Asian Championships 2nd Team (2015); All-Chinese CBA Honorable Mention (2016, 2017); Chinese CBA Player of the Week (Rd.4 2017)

Sani Sakakini (Arabic: سني سكاكيني; born August 19, 1988) is a Palestinian professional basketball player for Kuwait SC of the FIBA West Asia Super League (WASL) and the Kuwaiti Basketball League. In 2017, he ranked second all-time highest in the FIBA Asia Championship in scoring average, after the 2015 edition where he ranked first in scoring and rebounds (22.4 PPG and 12.6 RPG in 8 games).

== Professional career ==
Sakakini started playing basketball at the age of 14 in the Sarriyet Ramallah club. His international career started in 2007 after he went to Applied Science University in Jordan and joined the Jordanian Premier League playing three seasons for Al Riyadi Amman. He came back to the league in 2015 to play one season with Orthodox and help the team win the title.

In 2011, Sakakini started in the minor NBL league with Guangzhou Free Man before playing in the main CBA league for four seasons with Qingdao Eagles, Jiangsu Monkey King and Tianjin Gold Lions. He started 115 games for 126 appearances, averaging 19.3 PPG and 12.5 RPG.

He also played a few games in 2014 and 2016 in the LBL league for Hoops Club and Champville SC. He started 17 games out of 17 appearances, averaging 18.4 PPG and 10.6 RPG.

For the 2017-2018 season, Sakakini joined the LPB league playing for the Trotamundos de Carabobo.

On August 29, 2021, Sakakini officially joined the Taichung Suns of the T1 League in Taiwan. On July 2, 2022, Sakakini was selected to the all-T1 League first team in 2021–22 season.

On October 9, 2024, Sakakini signed with the New Taipei Kings of the East Asia Super League (EASL).

On September 3, 2025, Sakakini re-signed with the New Taipei Kings of the Taiwan Professional Basketball League (TPBL). On December 18, Sakakini took a plane to Jordan for recovery.

On September 10, 2026, Sakakini signed with the Kuwait of the FIBA West Asia Super League (WASL).

== National team career ==
Sakakini joined the Palestine national basketball team in 2006. He contributed in rebuilding the Palestine national basketball team with coach Jerry Steele and recruiting players such as former University of Minnesota guard Jamal Abu-Shamala. This led to the team's first ever qualification to the FIBA Asia Championship in 2015.

In August 2021, Sakakini has announced his retirement from international basketball. The announcement came after his Palestinian team got two consecutive losses at the FIBA Asia Cup qualifiers, dropping them from the tournament.

== Career statistics ==
Statistics from FIBA, CBA, REAL GM, EUROBASKET, SBL.

Legend
GP	Games played	MPG	Minutes per game	FG%	Field goal percentage
3P%	3-point field goal percentage	FT%	Free throw percentage	RPG	Rebounds per game
APG	Assists per game	SPG	Steals per game	BPG	Blocks per game
PPG	Points per game	**Bold**	Career high		Led the league

=== Regular season ===
Year	Team	League	GP	MPG	FG%	3P%	FT%	RPG	APG	SPG	BPG	PPG
2011	Guangzhou Free Man	NBL	20		54.2	25.0	67.5	9.8		1.1		14.5
2011-2012	Qingdao DoubleStar	CBA	31	27.3	51.6	16.7	67.4	8.2	1.3	1.0	0.3	10.5
2013	Al Riyadi Amman	JPL	18					11.8	2.6	1.2		23.9
2013	Sarriyet Ramallah	PBBA	8					**15.7**	**3.0**	**3.6**	**2.3**	**32.7**
2013-2014	Qingdao DoubleStar	CBA	29	39.4	51.7	20.8	75.6	13.8	2.2	1.5	0.4	18.9
2014	Hoops Club	LBL	9	39.2	42.3	22.2	74.1	11.9	2.7	2.0	0.6	20.4
2015-2016	Jiangsu Tongxi	CBA	30	42.6	46.2	20.5	76.3	14.7	2.4	1.7	0.4	23.2
2016	Champville SC	LBL	8	31.4	47.2	00.0	78.4	9.1	1.9	1.5	0.1	16.1
2016-2017	Tianjin Ronggang	CBA	35	41.2	54.5	33.7	79.6	13.3	2.0	1.0	0.3	24.0
2017-2018	Guangzhou Long-Lions	CBA	**37**	40.1	52.4	32.3	85.4	11.7	2.2	1.3	0.3	21.2
2018-2019	Yulon Luxgen Dinos	SBL	22	31.8	47.6	26.9	79.8	13.6	2.5	1.5	0.8	23.6

=== International tournaments ===
Year	Team	League	GP	MPG	FG%	3P%	FT%	RPG	APG	SPG	BPG	PPG
2015	Palestine	FIBA Asia Championship	8	35.9	.407	.205	.682	12.6	2.4	1.5	0.3	22.4

=== Career highs ===
Sakakini scored a season-high 48 points and 22 rebounds on 11/11/2015 in a 111-101 win of Jiangsu Monkey King over Tianjin Gold Lions.

== Off the court ==
He is the son of George Sakakini, and elder brother of Salim Sakakini who also plays on the Palestine national basketball team.
