= Leon Kwek =

Singaporean basketball player

Kwek Wei Meng, Leon (郭伟民)
No. 10 – Singapore Slingers
- Position: Shooting guard / forward
- League: Asean Basketball League

Personal information
- Born: 19 August 1996 (age 29) Singapore
- Listed height: 6 ft 3 in (1.91 m)
- Listed weight: 185 lb (84 kg)

Career information
- College: Republic Polytechnic
- Playing career: 2015–present

Career history
- 2015-2020: Singapore Slingers
Medals
Representing Singapore
Men's basketball
Southeast Asian Games
Bronze medal – third place	2015 Singapore	Team
SEABA Championship
Bronze medal – third place	2015 SEABA Championship	Team
SEABA Cup
Bronze medal – third place	2016 Stankovic Cup	Team

Leon Kwek Wei Meng (郭伟民) (born 19 August 1996) is a Singaporean basketball player who plays for the Singapore Slingers in the Asean Basketball League (ABL). When he first joined the Singapore Slingers in 2015, he was only aged 19. In the 2016/2017 ABL season, he had a breakout year while leading the Singapore Slingers in scoring among locals. Leon was selected to join the Singapore National Basketball Youth team at the age of 14, and is an active member of the Singapore National Basketball Men's team. Kwek is currently the captain of the Singapore Basketball Men's team.

== Club career ==
Kwek started off his professional career in 2015 when he was only 19 years old. He played for the Singapore Slingers. Kwek was given the title Most Valuable Player and Top Scorer when he competed at the National Basketball League Division 1 in 2014.

== International career ==
Kwek is the captain of the men's Singapore national basketball team. He is also a member of the Singapore Slingers, whereby he has the most 3 points made by a local in Singapore Slingers History. In 2020, he was awarded Player of the Game, which he played against Taiwan Fubon Braves.

Kwek was the co-captain, alongside Delvin Goh, of the men's 3x3 basketball team for the 2021 Southeast Asian Games, held in Hanoi, Vietnam.

== See also ==
- FIBA Asia Championship
- Singapore national basketball team
