= Bassel Bawji =

American/Lebanese basketball player

Personal information
- Born: December 26, 1989 (age 36) Los Angeles, California
- Listed height: 6 ft 8 in (2.03 m)
- Listed weight: 225 lb (102 kg)

Career information
- High school: Klein Collins (Spring, Texas)
- College: Tulsa (2008–2009)
- Playing career: 2009–2021
- Position: Power forward

Career history
- 2009–2014: Al Mouttahed Tripoli
- 2014–2015: Champville SC
- 2015–2016: Byblos Club
- 2016–2017: Champville SC
- 2017–2018: Beirut Club
- 2018–2020: Riyadi SC
- 2020–2021: Dynamo Lebanon

Career highlights
- All Lebanese First Team (2012)* 2× Lebanese League Most Improved Player (2009, 2010); Lebanese Basketball League Champion (2019)

Fahed Bassel Nazih Bawji, known as Bassel Bawji (born December 26, 1989) is a Lebanese-American retired professional basketball player who played as a power forward. He last played for Dynamo Lebanon of the Lebanese Basketball League.

== Junior career ==
At age 15, Bawji started his international career with the Lebanese Junior National Team. In 2006, Bawji travelled to the United States to continue his high school education and compete at the high school level. In 2006, he registered in Cypress Christian school located in Houston TX. The same year Bawji got to win the Texas state championship. The following year Bawji attended Klein Collins High school, where he averaged a double-double (11 pts 12 rebs), which helped him get selected to the Texas All-Star game event, in which he had 14 points and 18 rebounds.

== Professional career ==
=== National Team Senior ===
Year	Event	Games played
2011	FIBA Asia Championship for Men	7
2015	FIBA Asia Championship	9
2017	WABA Men Championship	3
2017	FIBA Asia Cup	7
2019	FIBA Basketball World Cup 2019 Asian Qualifiers	10

=== Leagues ===
Year	League	Club	Games played
2018	FIBA Asia Champions Cup	Al Riyadi	5
2019	FIBA Asia Champions Cup	Al Riyadi	5

== Personal life ==
Bassel Bawji was born in Santa Monica, Los Angeles on December 26, 1989, to parents Nazih Bawji and Sawsan El Sayed. His father Nazih, a former basketball player and captain of Riyadi Club and the Lebanese National team, established the Harlem Basketball Academy (Beirut), the first one in the region.

== Player profile ==
Bawji is a power forward. The main weakness cited in Bawji is his lack of ability in three-point range; he has averaged 26.7% on three-point field goal percentage throughout his first three seasons.
