= Alex Legion =

American basketball player

Personal information
- Born: November 16, 1988 (age 37) Detroit, Michigan, U.S.
- Listed height: 6 ft 5 in (1.96 m)
- Listed weight: 200 lb (91 kg)

Career information
- High school: Oak Hill Academy (Mouth of Wilson, Virginia)
- College: Kentucky (2007–2008); Illinois (2008–2010); FIU (2010–2011)
- NBA draft: 2011: undrafted
- Playing career: 2012–2019
- Position: Shooting guard

Career history
- 2012–2013: PVSK Panthers
- 2013–2014: Roseto Sharks
- 2014: Sagesse Beirut
- 2014: Veroli Basket
- 2014–2015: Pallacanestro Trapani
- 2015–2016: Al Jaysh Doha
- 2016: Arkadikos
- 2016–2017: Viola Reggio Calabria
- 2017–2018: Fortitudo Bologna
- 2018: Pallacanestro Mantovana
- 2018–2019: Valdivia

Career highlights
- Fourth-team Parade All-American (2007)

Alex Legion (born November 16, 1988) is an American former professional basketball player.

== College career ==
He signed out of high school with the University of Michigan but withdrew his commitment when Wolverine head coach Tommy Amaker was fired. He then enrolled at the University of Kentucky but transferred to the University of Illinois during his first college semester. Legion enrolled for the second semester, making him eligible to play after the conclusion of the fall semester of 2008. He played his sophomore year and half of his junior year with the Illinois, but after averaging only 2.7 points in 10 minutes per game at the beginning of the 2009 season, he decided not to return to the team after winter break. Legion then transferred to Florida International University, to be coached by Isiah Thomas. In February 2011, Legion was dismissed from Florida International University for a violation of team rules.

=== College statistics ===
Year	Team	GP	GS	MPG	FG%	3P%	FT%	RPG	APG	SPG	BPG	PPG
2007–08	Kentucky	6	2	17.5	.417	.333	.556	1.8	1.3	1.5	.2	6.7
2008–09	Illinois	22	0	11.1	.289	.240	.750	1.5	0.5	.4	.0	3.5
2009–10	Illinois	11	1	9.9	.297	.211	.667	0.9	0.5	.3	.1	2.7
2010–11	Florida International	10	2	28.1	.462	.431	.636	5.1	1.3	1.0	.4	13.0
Career		49	5	15.1	.373	.323	.657	2.1	0.8	.6	.1	5.7

== Professional career ==
After one year of workouts, he signed with the PVSK Panthers of Hungary for the 2012–13 season.

In September 2013, he signed with Roseto Sharks of Italy for the 2013–14 season. In May 2014, he joined Sagesse Beirut of Lebanon for one game. In July 2014, he returned to Italy and signed with Veroli Basket. On December 4, 2014, he left Veroli and signed with Pallacanestro Trapani for the rest of the season.

On July 18, 2015, Legion signed with Al Jaysh Doha of the Qatari Basketball League. On January 26, 2016, he signed with Arkadikos of Greece for the rest of the 2015–16 Greek Basket League season.

On July 29, 2016, Legion signed with Viola Reggio Calabria of Italy for the 2016–17 season. On January 23, 2017, he left Reggio Calabria and signed with Fortitudo Bologna for the rest of the season. On June 20, 2017, he re-signed with Fortitudo for one more season. On February 1, 2018, he left Fortitudo and signed with Pallacanestro Mantovana for the rest of the 2017–18 season.

On November 25, 2018, Legion signed with CD Valdivia but his contract was not renewed.
