= Jasmon Youngblood =

American basketball player

Personal information
- Born: August 17, 1984 (age 42)
- Listed height: 6 ft 5 in (1.96 m)
- Listed weight: 211 lb (96 kg)

Career information
- High school: Crockett High School (Austin, Texas)
- College: Mott CC (2002–2004); Kent State (2004–2006)
- NBA draft: 2006: undrafted
- Playing career: 2006–2019
- Position: Shooting guard / small forward

Career history
- 2006–2007: Kapfenberg Bulls
- 2007–2009: Oberwart Gunners
- 2009–2010: BSC Fürstenfeld Panthers
- 2010–2011: Champville Club
- 2011–2012: Anibal Zahle
- 2013–2014: UBA
- 2014–2017: Byblos Club
- 2017–2018: Sagesse
- 2019: Al-Wakrah

Jasmon Youngblood is an American-Lebanese former professional basketball player. He played for Byblos Club in the 2016–2017 season and he averaged 21.2 points per game, 5.4 rebounds, 3.6 assists and 1.9 steals.
