= Trey Johnson =

American basketball player and coach (born 1984)

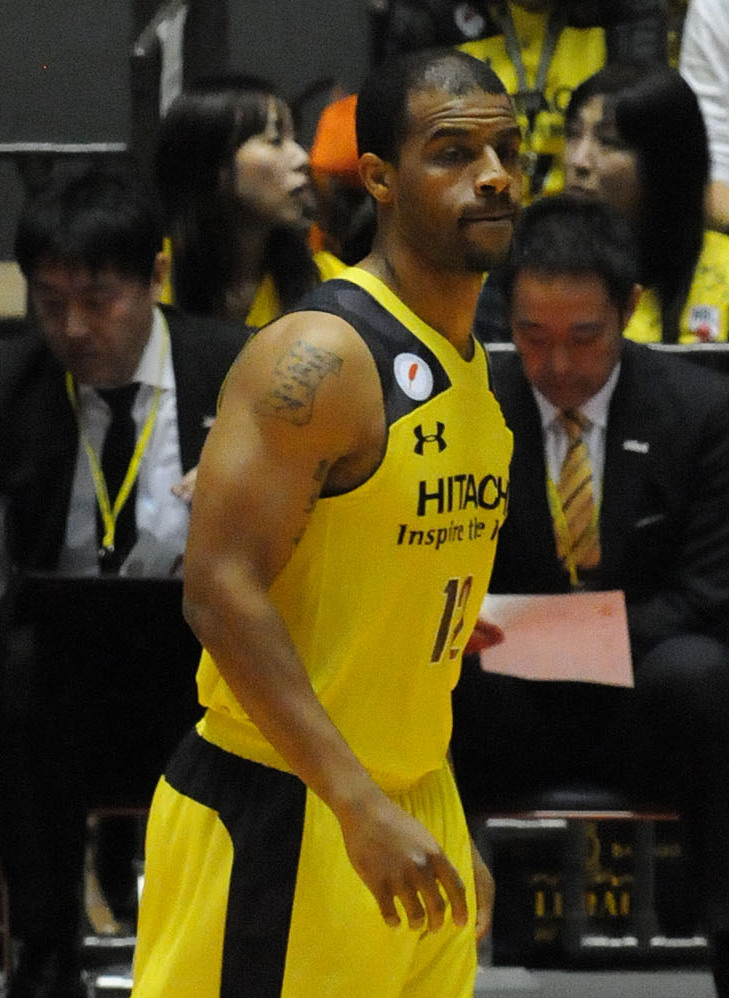
- Johnson with the Hitachi SunRockers in 2015

Jackson State Tigers
- Title: Head coach
- League: Southwestern Athletic Conference

Personal information
- Born: August 30, 1984 (age 42) Jackson, Mississippi, U.S.
- Listed height: 6 ft 5 in (1.96 m)
- Listed weight: 218 lb (99 kg)

Career information
- High school: Murrah (Jackson, Mississippi)
- College: Northeast Mississippi (2002–2003); Alcorn State (2003–2004); Jackson State (2005–2007)
- NBA draft: 2007: undrafted
- Playing career: 2007–2015
- Position: Shooting guard
- Number: 24, 12, 10
- Coaching career: 2020–present

Career history

Playing
- 2007–2008: Hemofarm
- 2008–2012: Bakersfield Jam
- 2009: Cleveland Cavaliers
- 2009–2010: BCM Gravelines
- 2010: Pallacanestro Biella
- 2011: Toronto Raptors
- 2011: Los Angeles Lakers
- 2011–2012: New Orleans Hornets
- 2012–2013: Pallacanestro Biella
- 2014: Marinos de Anzoátegui
- 2014: Maccabi Rishon LeZion
- 2014–2015: Hitachi SunRockers

Coaching
- 2020–2022: Alabama State (associate HC)
- 2022–2026: Jackson State (associate HC)
- 2026–present: Jackson State

Career highlights
- 2× NBA D-League All-Star (2009, 2011); All-NBA D-League First Team (2011); All-NBA D-League Second Team (2009); SWAC Player of the Year (2007)
- Stats at NBA.com
- Stats at Basketball Reference

Clinton "Trey" Johnson III (born August 30, 1984) is an American-Qatari basketball coach and former professional player who is the head coach for the Jackson State Tigers. He played college basketball with the Alcorn State Braves and the Jackson State Tigers in the Southwestern Athletic Conference (SWAC). During his senior year, he won the SWAC Player of the Year award. He has spent much of his professional career with the Bakersfield Jam in the NBA Development League (NBA D-League), a minor league basketball organization owned and run by the National Basketball Association (NBA). During his time in the D-League, he received a call-up to the NBA and has played for the Cleveland Cavaliers, the Toronto Raptors and the Los Angeles Lakers. He has also spent several short stints overseas in Serbia, France, and Italy. He has represented Qatar in international competition.

== Early life ==
Trey Johnson was born and grew up in Jackson, Mississippi. His father, Clinton Jr., and his older brother, Will, played college baseball for Jackson State University. He followed his father's footsteps and started playing baseball since he was young. He then started to play basketball during his teenage years. However, he only played basketball intermittently through middle school and high school. He attended Murrah High School and played both basketball and baseball there. He starred as a pitcher during high school and after graduating, he was selected in the 30th round of the 2002 Major League Baseball draft by the Kansas City Royals. However, he opted to attend college and play collegiate sports before turning pro.

== College career ==
Johnson attended Northeast Mississippi Community College in Booneville, Mississippi. He played both baseball and basketball there for one season. As a basketball player, he averaged 19.0 points, 6.0 rebounds, 4.0 assists and 3.0 steals per game. After a year, he enrolled at Alcorn State University and continued to play both sports there. However, at his first appearance as a pitcher for Alcorn State, he suffered a ligament injury on his elbow that required a Tommy John surgery. He needed one year to fully recover from the injury and therefore, he became a full-time basketball player. He averaged 11.0 points, 2.4 rebounds and 2.7 assists per game while shooting 41.5% from three-point range. However, he was unsatisfied with the basketball program there and later transferred to Jackson State University for his junior season.

Due to the National Collegiate Athletic Association (NCAA) transfer rules, Johnson sat out the 2004–05 season. The following season, he led the Jackson State Tigers to the Southwestern Athletic Conference (SWAC) Semifinal but the Tigers was defeated by the eventual champion, Southern, 66–59. He averaged 23.5 points on 45.5 percent shooting, 4.8 rebounds and 2.3 assists in 32 games. With 23.5 points per game, he became the 10th leading scorer in the country and second in the SWAC. He scored a season-high 40 points during a game against Texas Southern. After his junior season, he declared himself eligible for the 2006 NBA draft but later withdrew his name and decided to return to Jackson State for his senior year.

In his senior year, Johnson led the Tigers to the SWAC Final. He scored a game-high 33 points in the final as Jackson State defeated Mississippi Valley State 81–71. Jackson State also earned a spot in the NCAA tournament for the first time in seven years. However, their NCAA trip was cut short when the Tigers was beaten 112–69 by the eventual champion, Florida. Nevertheless, Johnson became one of the season's best performers by averaging 27.1 points, 4.5 rebounds and 2.6 assists in 35 games. He ranked second in scoring, after Reggie Williams who averaged 28.1 points per game. He was also named as the SWAC Player of the Year. He scored a career-high 49 points during a game against UTEP. He finished his college career with 1,698 points in only two seasons with Jackson State and became the school's eighth-all-time-leading scorer.

== Professional career ==
=== 2007–08 season ===
Johnson was automatically eligible for the 2007 NBA draft after finishing his four-year college eligibility. However, he went undrafted. He then played for the Miami Heat in the 2007 Orlando Summer League. On October 1, 2007, he was signed by the New Orleans Hornets for their training camp and preseason roster. He played in five games, averaging 4.0 points and 1.8 assists in 13.8 minutes per game. Before the season started, Johnson was waived by the Hornets and became a free agent.

Johnson started his professional career in Serbia with KK Hemofarm. He later returned to the U.S. to sign with the Bakersfield Jam of the NBA Development League (D-League) on January 25, 2008. He played 24 games (1 as a starter) with the Jam and averaged 11.8 points, 3.3 rebounds and 4.0 assists in 27.2 minutes per game.

=== 2008–09 season ===
In July 2008, Johnson played for the Milwaukee Bucks in the 2008 NBA Summer League. He played in five games, averaging 5.4 points and 1.8 rebounds in 11.0 minutes per game. On September 26, 2008, he was signed by the Phoenix Suns for their training camp and pre-season roster. However, he did not appear in any preseason game for the Suns and was waived on October 13.

He returned to the Bakersfield Jam for the 2008–09 season. On February 3, 2009, after playing 25 games while averaging 20.1 points with the Jam, Johnson was signed by the Cleveland Cavaliers on a 10-day contract. On the same day, he was selected to the D-League All-Star Game roster. In the game, he scored a team-high 15 points as his team, the Red Team, defeated the Blue Team 113–103. After the All-Star break, he rejoined the Cavaliers on second 10-day contract. He played four games with the Cavaliers, scoring four points from four free throw attempts. He only played a total of 14 minutes in those four games while failed to make a field goal. After his second 10-day contract expired, he returned to the D-League with the Jam. He ended the season with the Jam, playing 39 games, all of them as a starter, and averaging 20.7 points, 3.8 rebounds and 4.5 assists in 40.1 minutes per game. He was also named to the All NBA D-League Second Team.

=== 2009–10 season ===
During the 2009 offseason, Johnson participated in both the Orlando Summer League and the NBA Summer League. He played for the Indiana Pacers in the 2009 Orlando Summer League. He played in all five games, averaging 9.6 points in 28.3 minutes per game. He later took part in the 2009 NBA Summer League as part of the NBA D-League Select Team. He was reportedly rejected an offer to play for the San Antonio Spurs Summer League roster and opted to play with the D-League Select Team which was coached by Scott Roth, his coach at Bakersfield Jam. He appeared in the first two games before missing the last three games due to injury. He averaged 16.0 points on 54.5 percent shooting in 24.5 minutes per game.

Johnson then signed with French team BCM Gravelines in August 2009. He left Gravelines in February 2010 after playing in 17 games while averaging 8.8 points and 2.2 rebounds in 23.2 minutes per game. After leaving France, he was re-signed by the Bakersfield Jam on March 2, 2010. He averaged 21.3 points, 3.4 rebounds and 7.1 assists in 13 games with the Jam. On April, after the D-League season ended, Johnson was signed by Italian team Pallacanestro Biella for the rest of the season. He played four games in Italy and averaged 11.5 points per game.

=== 2010–11 season ===
In July 2010, Johnson played for the Los Angeles Clippers in the 2010 NBA Summer League. He played in all five games, averaging 6.6 points in 25.6 minutes per game. Despite playing for the Clippers in the offseason, Johnson was signed by the Clippers' crosstown rival, the Los Angeles Lakers, for their training camp and preseason games. After playing five games and averaging 2.8 points and 1.2 assists in 8.8 minutes per game, he was waived before the season started.

He then returned to the Bakersfield Jam for the 2010–11 season. On January 26, 2011, after playing 26 games while averaging 25.8 points, Johnson signed a 10-day contract with the Toronto Raptors. After playing five games in 10 days, he earned a second 10-day contract. In February 2011, he received his second selection to the D-League All-Star Game. However, he did not participate because he was called up to the NBA and was not on a D-League roster on the day of the All-Star Game. After the All-Star Break, his second 10-day contract expired and Johnson returned to the D-League with the Jam. He ended the season with a 25.5 points per game average, becoming the league's scoring leader in the 2010–11 season. He scored in double figures in 38 games out of 39 games played for the Jam. He also scored a season-high 48 points in a game against Erie BayHawks on March 18, 2011. He was also named to the All-NBA D-League First Team.

On April 13, 2011, Johnson signed with the Lakers for the remainder of the season. On that day, he played 13 minutes and scored 6 points in the Lakers' final regular season game. He also played three games in the playoffs.

=== 2011–12 season ===
On August 3, 2011, Johnson signed a one-year deal with Italian club Bancatercas Teramo. However, due to an injury, he was released three months later without playing a single minute.

After the 2011 NBA lockout ended, he signed with the New Orleans Hornets on December 9, 2011. On January 27, 2012, Johnson was waived by the Hornets after playing in 11 games and averaging 1.9 points and 1.1 rebounds in 5.5 minutes per game.

On March 15, 2012, he was re-acquired by the Bakersfield Jam.

=== 2012–13 season ===
On November 6, 2012, Johnson signed with his former team Pallacanestro Biella of Italy. He left the club in April 2014.

=== 2013–14 season ===
In January 2014, he signed with Marinos de Anzoátegui of Venezuela. On March 3, 2014, he signed with Maccabi Rishon LeZion of Israel for the remainder of the season.

=== 2014–15 season ===
On September 25, 2014, Johnson signed with the Sacramento Kings. However, he was later waived by the Kings on October 25, 2014.

On December 5, 2014, he signed with Hitachi SunRockers of the Japanese National Basketball League.

== International competition ==
Johnson has played for the Qatar national basketball team.

== Television ==
Johnson was followed by a film crew throughout the 2011 NBA D-League Showcase, and was the subject of a documentary.

== Coaching career ==
Johnson was the associate head coach for the Alabama State Hornets basketball under head coach Mo Williams from 2020 to 2022. He returned to his alma mater Jackson State as associate head coach in 2022.

== Career statistics ==
Legend
GP	Games played	GS	Games started	MPG	Minutes per game
FG%	Field goal percentage	3P%	3-point field goal percentage	FT%	Free throw percentage
RPG	Rebounds per game	APG	Assists per game	SPG	Steals per game
BPG	Blocks per game	PPG	Points per game	**Bold**	Career high

=== College ===
Year	Team	GP	GS	MPG	FG%	3P%	FT%	RPG	APG	SPG	BPG	PPG
2003–04	Alcorn State	29		28.8	.414	.415	**.781**	2.4	**2.7**	.5	**.1**	11.0
2005–06	Jackson State	32	29	34.8	**.455**	**.441**	.750	**4.8**	2.3	**1.4**	**.1**	23.5
2006–07	Jackson State	**35**	**35**	**37.8**	.414	.333	.743	4.5	2.6	.9	**.1**	**27.1**
**Career**		96		36.4	.429	.382	.751	4.0	2.5	.8	.1	21.0

=== NBA ===
==== Regular season ====
Year	Team	GP	GS	MPG	FG%	3P%	FT%	RPG	APG	SPG	BPG	PPG
2008–09	Cleveland	4	0	3.5	.000	.000	**1.000**	.3	.0	.0	.0	1.0
2010–11	Toronto	7	0	11.6	.333	**.333**	.875	1.0	**1.6**	**.1**	**.1**	4.0
2010–11	L.A. Lakers	1	0	**13.0**	**.667**	.000	**1.000**	.0	.0	.0	.0	**6.0**
2011–12	New Orleans	**11**	0	5.5	.571	.000	**1.000**	**1.1**	.4	**.1**	.0	1.9
**Career**		23	0	7.3	.385	.333	.947	.9	.7	.1	.0	2.6

==== Playoffs ====
Year	Team	GP	GS	MPG	FG%	3P%	FT%	RPG	APG	SPG	BPG	PPG
2011	L.A. Lakers	3	0	3.9	.200	.000	.500	1.3	.3	.0	.0	1.0

=== D-League ===
==== Regular season ====
Year	Team	GP	GS	MPG	FG%	3P%	FT%	RPG	APG	SPG	BPG	PPG
2007–08	Bakersfield	24	1	26.0	.457	.378	.792	3.3	4.0	.6	.0	11.8
2008–09	Bakersfield	**39**	**39**	**40.1**	.464	**.409**	.795	3.8	4.5	.7	.0	20.7
2009–10	Bakersfield	13	13	39.7	.469	.167	**.867**	3.4	**7.1**	**1.0**	**.2**	21.3
2010–11	Bakersfield	**39**	**39**	36.0	**.499**	.323	.815	**4.2**	4.5	.9	.1	**25.5**
2011–12	Bakersfield	11	0	27.7	.466	.000	.861	3.3	5.7	.5	.0	12.8
**Career**		126	92	35.0	.477	.351	.815	3.8	4.8	.8	.1	19.9

==== Playoffs ====
Year	Team	GP	GS	MPG	FG%	3P%	FT%	RPG	APG	SPG	BPG	PPG
2009	Bakersfield	1		**45.0**	**.450**	.000	.833	**6.0**	**3.0**	**1.0**	.0	23.0
2011	Bakersfield	1		36.0	.385	.167	**.889**	**6.0**	**3.0**	.0	.0	**29.0**
2012	Bakersfield	**4**		26.8	.327	**.667**	.774	3.0	2.8	**1.0**	.0	14.5
**Career**		6		31.3	.368	.300	.804	4.0	2.8	.8	.0	18.3
