= Jamal Abu-Shamala =

Palestinian-American basketball player

Personal information
- Born: July 25, 1987 (age 39) Shakopee, Minnesota, U.S.
- Listed height: 6 ft 5 in (1.96 m)
- Listed weight: 210 lb (95 kg)

Career information
- High school: Shakopee (Shakopee, Minnesota)
- College: Minnesota (2005–2009)
- NBA draft: 2009: undrafted
- Playing career: 2010–2018
- Position: Small forward

Career history
- 2010: Sioux Falls Skyforce
- 2010-2011: Potros Itson
- 2011: Rayos de Hermosillo
- 2017-2018: Seraeyett Ramallah

Jamal Abu-Shamala (Arabic: جمال أبو شمالة; born July 25, 1987) is a Palestinian-American former professional basketball player. He played college basketball for the Minnesota Golden Gophers. Abu-Shamala played in the NBA Development League for the Sioux Falls Skyforce during the 2010–11 season.

Abu-Shamala first represented the Jordanian national team and began to play internationally in 2008. He joined the Palestine national team in 2011 and later represented them internationally.

== College career ==
Abu-Shamala came to the University of Minnesota as a walk-on but earned a scholarship after playing in 30 games and starting 10 games during his freshman season in 2005–06. His best season statistically was his sophomore season in 2006–07 when he played in 31 games, started 21 games, averaged 6.5 points per game, and made 44-of-102 three-point attempts. He finished his career with 128 games played, 62 starts, 592 points, 270 rebounds, a field goal percentage of 43.2% (203–469) and three-point field goal percentage of 40.1% (106–264). His career three-point field percentage ranked him seventh all-time at Minnesota. In 2009, Abu-Shamala was named the University of Minnesota's male recipient of the Outstanding Student-Athlete Award for his accomplishments in athletics, academics, leadership and volunteerism.

== International career ==
Abu-Shamala was noticed by the Jordan men's national basketball team while playing in a game broadcast on ESPN. He said he was eligible to play for the team because of his Palestinian father and "65–75 percent of Jordan is Palestinian". Abu-Shamala was not aware of the Palestine men's national basketball team when he committed and only realized the team existed when he played against them in a tournament. Although he felt like he should be playing for Palestine, his commitments to Jordan prevented him from joining the team immediately. Abu-Shamala played for Jordan as they retained their title at the William Jones Cup.

Abu-Shamala was unable to obtain a Jordanian passport after his second year with the team and played his first game with the Palestine team at the 2011 Pan Arab Games.

== Personal life ==
Abu-Shamala was born to a Palestinian father and an American mother. His father moved to the United States from Gaza at the age of 21.
