= Ivan Yeo =

Malaysian basketball player (born 1993)

Personal information
- Born: March 2, 1993 (age 33) Kelantan, Malaysia
- Listed height: 6 ft 5 in (1.96 m)
- Listed weight: 90 kg (198 lb)

Career information
- Playing career: 2013–2019
- Position: Power forward / center

Career history
- 2013–2015: Bintulu Dragons
- 2015–2019: Westports Malaysia Dragons
- 2019: NS Matrix

Career highlights
- ABL champion (2016)

Ivan Yeo (born March 2, 1993, in Kelantan, Malaysia) is a Malaysian professional basketball player. Yeo is one of Malaysia's most prominent basketball figures.

He averaged most minutes, points and rebounds for the Malaysia national basketball team at the 2015 FIBA Asia Championship in Changsha, China.
