= Kwaan Yoong Jing =

Malaysian basketball player (born 1990)

Personal information
- Born: 13 July 1990 (age 36)
- Listed height: 6 ft 6 in (1.98 m)
- Listed weight: 80 kg (176 lb)

Career information
- Playing career: 2009–present
- Position: Center

Career history
- 2009–2020: Westports Malaysia Dragons

Career highlights
- ABL champion (2016)

Chinese name
- Simplified Chinese: 关勇缙
- Traditional Chinese: 關勇縉
- Hanyu Pinyin: Guān Yǒngjìn

Kwaan Yoong Jing (born 13 July 1990) is a Malaysian professional basketball player. He previously played for Westports Malaysia Dragons of the ASEAN Basketball League.

He represented Malaysia's national basketball team at the 2015 FIBA Asia Championship in Changsha, China where he was his team's best shot blocker.
