= Delvin Goh =

Singaporean basketball player (born 1995)

Delvin Goh Kok Chiang
Free agent
- Position: Center / Power forward

Personal information
- Born: 14 April 1995 (age 31) Singapore

Career information
- Playing career: 2011–present

Career history
- 2011–2023: Singapore Slingers
- 2023: Siglap Basketball Club
- 2023–2024: NS Matrix
- 2024–2025: Singapore Adroit

Career highlights
- SEABA Cup Most Rebounds (2016)
Medals
Men's basketball
Representing Singapore
Southeast Asian Games
Bronze medal – third place	2013 Naypyidaw	Team
Bronze medal – third place	2015 Singapore	Team
SEABA Cup
Bronze medal – third place	2016 Stankovic Cup	Team

Delvin Goh Kok Chiang (born 14 April 1995) is a Singaporean basketball player. When he first joined the Singapore Slingers in 2011, aged 16, he was given the nickname "Wonder Kid".

== ABL career ==
Goh started off his career in 2011 when he was 16 years old. He played for the Singapore Slingers.

== ABL statistics ==
Goh's ABL statistics is in this link.

== International career ==
Goh is also a member of the men's Singapore national basketball team and co-captain. He won the bronze medals for both 2013 Naypyidaw and 2015 Singapore. In 2016, Goh became the first Singaporean basketballer to join a foreign team in recent years, spending a month playing for the semi-pro Brunei team, the Beruang Blazers.

== Filmography ==
Year	Title	Role	Notes	Ref
2014	Meeting the Giant	Chen Hang		

== See also ==
- FIBA Asia Championship
- Singapore national basketball team
