= 2019 in basketball =

The following are the basketball events of the year 2019 throughout the world.

Tournaments included international (FIBA), professional (club) and amateur and collegiate levels.

== International tournaments ==
=== National senior team tournaments ===
Date	Venue	Tournament	(gold) Champion	(silver) Runner-up	(bronze) Third place
June 27–July 7	Latvia; Serbia	FIBA Women's EuroBasket 2019	Spain	France	Serbia
July 8–16	Samoa	2019 Pacific Games – Men's Tournament	Guam	Tahiti	Fiji
July 8–16	Samoa	2019 Pacific Games – Women's Tournament	American Samoa	Fiji	Samoa
July 27–August 10	Peru	2019 Pan American Games – Men's Tournament	Argentina	Puerto Rico	United States
July 27–August 10	Peru	2019 Pan American Games – Women's Tournament	Brazil	United States	Puerto Rico
August 16–25	Senegal	2019 Women's Afrobasket	Nigeria	Senegal	Mali
August 31–September 15	China	2019 FIBA Basketball World Cup	Spain	Argentina	France
September 22–29	Puerto Rico	2019 FIBA Women's AmeriCup	United States	Canada	Brazil
September 22–29	India	2019 FIBA Women's Asia Cup	Japan	China	Australia
November 30–December 11	Philippines	2019 Southeast Asian Games – Men's Tournament	Philippines	Thailand	Vietnam
November 30–December 11	Philippines	2019 Southeast Asian Games – Women's Tournament	Philippines	Thailand	Indonesia

=== 3X3 championships ===
Date	Venue	Tournament	(gold) Champion	(silver) Runner-up	(bronze) Third place
November 30–December 11	Philippines	2019 Southeast Asian Games – Men's Tournament	Philippines	Indonesia	Vietnam
November 30–December 11	Philippines	2019 Southeast Asian Games – Women's Tournament	Philippines	Thailand	Malaysia

=== Other international championships ===
Date	Venue	Tournament	(gold) Champion	(silver) Runner-up	(bronze) Third place
July 12–21	(Taiwan) New Taipei City	2019 William Jones Cup	(Philippines) Mighty Sports	South Korea	Japan
July 24–28	(Taiwan) New Taipei City	2019 William Jones Cup for Women	(Japan) Mitsubishi Electric Koalas	New Zealand	(Taiwan) Republic of China White

=== FIBA youth championships ===
Date	Venue	Tournament	(gold) Champion	(silver) Runner-up	(bronze) Third place
June 29–July 7	Greece	2019 FIBA Under-19 Basketball World Cup	United States	Mali	France
July 20–28	Thailand	2019 FIBA Under-19 Women's Basketball World Cup	United States	Australia	Spain

== Professional club seasons ==
=== FIBA Intercontinental Cup ===
Champion	Runner-up	Result	Playoff format
(Greece) AEK Athens	(Brazil) Flamengo	86–70	Single-game final

=== Continental seasons ===
==== Men ====
Organizer	Tournament	Champion	Runner-up	Result	Playoff format
Euroleague Basketball	2018–19 EuroLeague	(Russia) CSKA Moscow	(Turkey) Anadolu Efes	91–83	Single-game final
Euroleague Basketball	2018–19 EuroCup Basketball	(Spain) Valencia	(Germany) Alba Berlin	2–1	Best-of-3 series
FIBA Americas	2019 FIBA Americas League	(Argentina) San Lorenzo	(Venezuela) Guaros de Lara	64–61	Single-game final
FIBA Asia	2019 FIBA Asia Champions Cup	(Japan) Alvark Tokyo	(Lebanon) Sporting Al Riyadi Beirut	98-74	Single-game final
FIBA Europe	2018–19 Basketball Champions League	(Italy) Segafredo Virtus Bologna	(Spain) Iberostar Tenerife	73–61	Single-game final
FIBA Europe	2018–19 FIBA Europe Cup	(Italy) Dinamo Sassari	(Germany) s.Oliver Würzburg	170–163	Two-legged tie

==== Women ====
Organizer	Tournament	Champion	Runner-up	Result	Playoff format
FIBA Europe	2018–19 EuroLeague Women	(Russia) UMMC Ekaterinburg	(Russia) Dynamo Kursk	91–67	Single-game final
FIBA Europe	2018–19 EuroCup Women	(Russia) Nadezhda Orenburg	(France) Montpellier	146–132	Two-legged tie

=== Regional seasons ===
==== Men ====
Region	League	Champion	Runner-up	Result	Playoff format
Former Yugoslavia	2018–19 ABA League	(Serbia) Crvena zvezda mts	(Montenegro) Budućnost VOLI	3–2	Best-of-5 series
Southeast Asia	2018–19 ABL season	BTN CLS Knights Indonesia	Singapore Slingers	3–2	Best-of-5 series
Alpe-Adria	2018–19 Alpe Adria Cup	(Hungary) Egis Körmend	(Croatia) Adria Oil Škrljevo	159–147	Two-legged tie
Estonia and Latvia	2018–19 Latvian–Estonian Basketball League	(Latvia) Ventspils	(Latvia) VEF Rīga	102–80	Single-game final
Balkans	2018–19 BIBL	(North Macedonia) Blokotehna	(Albania) Teuta	82–68	Single-game final

==== Women ====
Region	League	Champion	Runner-up	Result	Playoff format
Southeast Europe	2018–19 WABA League	(Bulgaria) Beroe	(Montenegro) Budućnost Bemax	65–64	Single-game final

=== Domestic league seasons ===
==== Men ====
Nation	Tournament	Champion	Runner-up	Result	Playoff format
Albania	2018–19 Albanian Basketball League	Goga	Teuta	3–2	Best-of-5 series
Albania	2019 Albanian Basketball Cup	Teuta	Goga	95–81	Single game final
Algeria	2018–19 Algerian Basketball Championship	GS Pétroliers	NB Staoueli	102-68	Single game final
Angola	2018–19 BAI Basket	Atlético Petróleos de Luanda	1 De Agosto	4-2	Best-of-7 series
Armenia	2018–19 Armenia Basketball League A	Aragats	Urartu Vivaro	5–1	Best-of-9 series
Argentina	2018–19 La Liga season	San Lorenzo	Instituto	4–3	Best-of-7 series
Australia (Note: Includes one team from New Zealand.)	2018–19 NBL season	Perth Wildcats	Melbourne United	3–1	Best-of-5 series
Austria	2018–19 Österreichische Basketball Bundesliga season	Kapfenberg Bulls	Swans Gmunden	3–0	Best-of-5 series
Austria	2018–19 Austrian Basketball Cup	Kapfenberg Bulls	Swans Gmunden	80–70	Single game final
Azerbaijan	2018–19 Azerbaijan Basketball League	NTD	Aztop	2-0	Best-of-3 series
Bahrain	2018–19 Bahraini Premier League	Al-Muharraq SC	Al-Riffa	3-0	Best-of-5 series
Belarus	2018–19 Belarusian Premier League	Tsmoki-Minsk	Borisfen	3–0	Best-of-5 series
Belgium	2018–19 Pro Basketball League	Filou Oostende	Telenet Giants Antwerp	3–1	Best-of-5 series
Belgium	2018–19 Belgian Basketball Cup	Telenet Giants Antwerp	Filou Oostende	76–70	Single game final
Bosnia and Herzegovina	2018–19 Basketball Championship of Bosnia and Herzegovina	Široki	Spars Ziraat Bank	3–2	Best-of-5 series
Bosnia and Herzegovina	2018–19 Basketball Cup of Bosnia and Herzegovina	Igokea	Spars Sarajevo	78–63	Single game final
Brazil	2018–19 NBB season	Flamengo	Sesi/Franca	3–2	Best-of-5 series
Bulgaria	2018–19 National Basketball League	Balkan Botevgrad	Levski Lukoil	3–1	Best-of-5 series
Bulgaria	2018–19 Bulgarian Basketball Cup	Levski Lukoil	Beroe	70–61	Single-game final
Canada	2018–19 NBL Canada season	Moncton Magic	St. John's Edge	4–0	Best-of-7 series
Chile	2018-19 LNB Chile season	CD Valdivia	Los Leones de Quilpue	4-1	Best-of-7 series
China	2018–19 CBA season	Guangdong Southern Tigers	Liaoning Flying Leopards	4–0	Best-of-7 series
Croatia	2018–19 Premijer liga	Cibona	Cedevita	4–0	Best-of-7 series
Croatia	2018–19 Krešimir Ćosić Cup	Cedevita	Cibona	89–74	Single game final
Cyprus	2018–19 Cyprus Basketball Division A	Keravnos	Petrolina AEK Larnaca	3–1	Best-of-5 series
Cyprus	2018–19 Cypriot Basketball Cup	Keravnos	Petrolina AEK Larnaca	89–86	Single game final
Czech Republic	2018–19 NBL (Czech Republic)	ČEZ Nymburk	Armex Děčín	3–0	Two-legged tie
Czech Republic	2018–19 Czech Republic Basketball Cup	Nymburk	Opava	102–68	Single game final
Denmark	2018–19 Basketligaen	Bakken Bears	Horsens	4–0	Best-of-7 series
Denmark	2018–19 Danish Basketball Cup	Horsens	Svendborg Rabbits	105–70	Single game final
Egypt	2018–19 Egyptian Super League	Zamalek	Al Gezira Cairo	3-2	Best-of-5 series
Egypt	2018–19 Egyptian Basketball Cup	Al Gezira Cairo	Al Ahly	80-79	Single-game final
Estonia	2018–19 Estonian Championship	Kalev/Cramo	Tallinna Kalev/TLÜ	3–0	Best-of-5 series
Finland	2018–19 Korisliiga season	Karhu	Kouvot	4–1	Best-of-7 series
Finland	2018–19 Finnish Basketball Cup	Salon Vilpas	Tampereen Pyrintö	106–93	Single-game final
France (Note: Includes one team from Monaco.)	2018–19 Pro A season	LDLC ASVEL	Monaco	3–2	Best-of-5 series
France	2018–19 French Basketball Cup	LDLC ASVEL	Le Mans	70-61	Single-game final
France	2019 Leaders Cup	SIG Strasbourg	JL Bourg	98–97	Single-game final
Georgia	2018–19 Georgian Superliga	Delta	Kutaisi	3–2	Best-of-5 series
Germany	2018–19 Basketball Bundesliga	Bayern Munich	Alba Berlin	3–0	Best-of-5 series
Germany	2019 BBL-Pokal	Brose Bamberg	Alba Berlin	83–82	Single-game final
Great Britain	2018–19 BBL	Leicester Riders	London City Royals	93–61	League system
Great Britain	2018–19 BBL Cup	London Lions	Glasgow Rocks	68–54	Single-game final
Great Britain	2018–19 BBL Trophy	London City Royals	London Lions	90–82	Single-game final
Greece	2018–19 Greek Basket League	Panathinaikos	Promitheas Patras	3–0	Best-of-5 series
Greece	2018–19 Greek Basketball Cup	Panathinaikos	PAOK	79–73	Single-game final
Hungary	2018–19 Nemzeti Bajnokság I/A	Falco-Vulcano Szombathely	Egis Körmend	3–0	Best-of-5 series
Hungary	2019 Magyar Kupa	Szolnoki Olaj	Falco KC Szombathely	93–82	Single-game final
Iceland	2018–19 Úrvalsdeild karla	KR	ÍR	3–2	Best-of-5 series
Iceland	2018–19 Icelandic Basketball Cup	Stjarnan	Njarðvík	84–68	Single-game final
Iran	2018–19 Iranian Basketball Super League	Palayesh Naft Abadan	Shahrdari Gorgan	3–1	Best-of-5 series
Ireland (Note: Basketball in the island of Ireland, including the league system, is organised on an All-Ireland basis. As such, the national league includes one team from Northern Ireland, which is politically part of the United Kingdom.)	2018–19 Irish Super League	Tralee Warriors	Templeogue		League system
Ireland	2018–19 Irish National Cup	Killester	UCD Marian	66–63	Single-game final
Israel	2018–19 Israeli Basketball Premier League	Maccabi Tel Aviv	Maccabi Rishon LeZion	89–75	Single-game final
Israel	2018–19 Israeli Basketball State Cup	Hapoel Jerusalem	Maccabi Rishon LeZion	82–67	Single-game final
Italy	2018–19 LBA	Umana Reyer Venezia	Banco di Sardegna Sassari	4–3	Best-of-7 series
Italy	2019 Italian Basketball Cup	Vanoli Cremona	New Basket Brindisi	83–74	Single-game final
Japan	2018–19 B.League season	Alvark Tokyo	Chiba Jets	71–67	Single-game final
Kazakhstan	2018–19 Kazakhstan Basketball Cup	Astana	Almaty Legion	84–62	Single-game final
Kosovo	2018–19 Kosovo Basketball Superleague	Z-Mobile Prishtina	Rahoveci	3–1	Best-of-5 series
Kosovo	2018–19 Kosovo Basketball Cup	Z-Mobile Prishtina	Rahoveci	96–60	Single-game final
Latvia	2018–19 Latvian Basketball League	VEF Rīga	Ventspils	4–1	Best-of-7 series
Lithuania	2018–19 LKL season	Žalgiris Kaunas	Rytas Vilnius	3–0	Best-of-5 series
Lithuania	2019 King Mindaugas Cup	Rytas Vilnius	Žalgiris Kaunas	70–67	Single-game final
Luxembourg	2018–19 Total League season	Etzella	T71 Dudelange	3–1	Best-of-5 series
Malta	2018–19 Division 1	Athleta	Hibernians	3–0	Best-of-5 series
Mexico	2018–19 LNBP season	Fuerza Regia de Monterrey	Capitanes de la Ciudad de México	4-2	Best-of-7 series
Moldova	2018–19 Moldovan National Division	Donbasket	Tighina	87–80	Best-of-5 series
Montenegro	2018–19 Prva A liga	Budućnost VOLI	Mornar	3–2	Best-of-5 series
Montenegro	2018–19 Montenegrin Basketball Cup	Budućnost VOLI	Sutjeska	85–71	Single-game final
Netherlands	2018–19 Dutch Basketball League	Landstede	Donar	4–2	Best-of-7 series
Netherlands	2018–19 NBB Cup	ZZ Leiden	Landstede Zwolle	87–69	Single-game final
New Zealand	2019 New Zealand NBL season (Note: Includes one team from Australia.)	Wellington Saints	Hawke's Bay Hawks	78–68	Single-game final
North Macedonia	2018–19 Macedonian First League	MZT Skopje Aerodrom	Rabotnički	3–0	Best-of-5 series
North Macedonia	2018–19 Macedonian Basketball Cup	Rabotnički	Blokotehna	85–71	Single-game final
Norway	2018–19 BLNO season	Kongsberg Miners	Gimle	2–1	Best-of-3 series
Philippines	2019 PBA Philippine Cup	San Miguel Beermen	Magnolia Hotshots	4–3	Best-of-7 series
Philippines	2019 PBA Commissioner's Cup	San Miguel Beermen	TNT KaTropa	4–2	Best-of-7 series
Poland	2018–19 PLK season	Anwil Wloclawek	Polski Cukier Toruń	4–3	Best-of-7 series
Poland	2019 Polish Basketball Cup	Stal Ostrów Wielkopolski	Arka Gdynia	77–74	Single-game final
Portugal	2018–19 LPB season	Oliveirense	Benfica	3–1	Best-of-5 series
Portugal	2018–19 Portuguese Basketball Cup	Porto	Oliveirense	83–80	Single-game final
Romania	2018–19 Liga Națională	Oradea	Sibiu	3–1	Best-of-5 series
Russia (Note: Includes one team each from Belarus, Estonia, Kazakhstan, and Latvia. The highest ranked team from Russia is also named as Russian Champions.)	2018–19 VTB United League	CSKA Moscow	Khimki	3–0	Best-of-5 series
Russia	2018–19 Russian Basketball Cup	Parma	Nizhny Novgorod	73–67	Single-game final
Serbia	2018–19 Basketball League of Serbia	Crvena zvezda mts	Partizan NIS	3–1	Best-of-5 series
Serbia	2018–19 Radivoj Korać Cup	Partizan NIS	Crvena zvezda mts	76–74	Single-game final
Slovakia	2018–19 Slovak Basketball League	Inter Bratislava	Prievidza	4–0	Best-of-7 series
Slovakia	2018–19 Slovak Basketball Cup	Levickí Patrioti	Inter Bratislava	78–75	Single-game final
Slovenia	2018–19 Slovenian Basketball League	Sixt Primorska	Petrol Olimpija	3–0	Best-of-5 series
Slovenia	2018–19 Slovenian Basketball Cup	Sixt Primorska	Hopsi Polzela	91–72	Single-game final
South Korea	2018–19 KBL season	Ulsan Hyundai Mobis Phoebus	Incheon Electroland Elephants	4–1	Best-of-7 series
Spain (Note: Includes one team from Andorra.)	2018–19 ACB season	Real Madrid	Barça Lassa	3–1	Best-of-5 series
Spain	2019 Copa del Rey de Baloncesto	Barça Lassa	Real Madrid	94–93	Single-game final
Sweden	2018–19 Basketligan season	Södertälje Kings	Borås	4–1	Best-of-7 series
Switzerland	2018–19 SBL	Fribourg Olympic	Lions de Genève	3–0	Best-of-7 series
Switzerland	2018–19 SBL Cup	Lions de Genève	SAM Basket Massagno	67–53	Single-game final
Turkey	2018–19 Basketbol Süper Ligi	Anadolu Efes	Fenerbahçe Beko	4–3	Best-of-7 series
Turkey	2019 Turkish Basketball Cup	Fenerbahçe Beko	Anadolu Efes	80–70	Single-game final
Ukraine	2018–19 SuperLeague	Khimik	Kyiv-Basket	3–0	Best-of-5 series
Ukraine	2018–19 Ukrainian Basketball Cup	Dnipro	Odesa	74–69	Single-game final
United States (Note: The NBA and the G League each include one team from Canada.)	2018–19 NBA season	Toronto Raptors	Golden State Warriors	4–2	Best-of-7 series
United States	2018–19 NBA G League season	Rio Grande Valley Vipers	Long Island Nets	2–1	Best-of-3 series

==== Women ====
Nation	Tournament	Champion	Runner-up	Result	Playoff format
Australia	2018–19 WNBL season	Canberra Capitals	Adelaide Lightning	2–1	Best-of-3 series
France	2018–19 Ligue Féminine de Basketball	Lyon ASVEL féminin	Lattes-Montpellier	3–2	Best-of-5 series
France	2018–19 Women's French Basketball Cup	Tango Bourges Basket	FCB Charleville-Mézières	67–58	Single-game final
Iceland	2018–19 Úrvalsdeild kvenna	Valur	Keflavík	3–0	Best-of-5 series
Iceland	2018–19 Icelandic Basketball Cup	Valur	Stjarnan	90–74	Single-game final
Romania	2018–19 Liga Națională	Sepsi SIC	Satu Mare	3–2	Best-of-5 series
Serbia	2018–19 Women's Basketball League of Serbia	Crvena zvezda Kombank	ŽKK 021	3–0	Best-of-5 series
Serbia	2018–19 Milan Ciga Vasojević Cup	Crvena zvezda Kombank	Radivoj Korać	56–55	Single-game final
Spain	2018–19 Liga Femenina de Baloncesto	Spar CityLift Girona	Perfumerías Avenida Salamanca	2–0	Best-of-3 series
United States	2019 WNBA season	Washington Mystics	Connecticut Sun	3-2	Best-of-5 series

== College seasons ==
=== Men's ===
Nation	League / Tournament	Champions	Runners-up	Result	Playoff format
Canada	2019 U Sports Men's Basketball Championship	Carleton Ravens	Calgary Dinos	83–49	Single-game final
Philippines	2018 PCCL National Collegiate Championship	Ateneo Blue Eagles	UV Green Lancers	95–71	Single-game final
United States	NCAA Division I	Virginia Cavaliers	Texas Tech Red Raiders	85–77 (OT)	Single-game final
United States	National Invitation Tournament	Texas Longhorns	Lipscomb Bisons	81–66	Single-game final
United States	NCAA Division II	Northwest Missouri State Bearcats	Point Loma Nazarene Sea Lions	64–58	Single-game final
United States	NCAA Division III	Wisconsin–Oshkosh Titans	Swarthmore Garnet	96–82	Single-game final
United States	NAIA Division I	Georgetown Tigers	Carroll Fighting Saints	68-48	Single-game final
United States	NAIA Division II	Spring Arbor Cougars	Oregon Tech Owls	82-76	Single-game final

=== Women's ===
Nation	League / Tournament	Champions	Runners-up	Result	Playoff format
Canada	2019 U Sports Women's Basketball Championship	McMaster Marauders	Laval Rouge et Or	70–58	Single-game final
Philippines	UAAP Season 82	NU Lady Bulldogs	UST Tigresses	2–0	Best-of-3 series
United States	NCAA Division I	Baylor Lady Bears	Notre Dame Fighting Irish	82–81	Single-game final
United States	Women's National Invitation Tournament	Arizona Wildcats	Northwestern Wildcats	56–42	Single-game final
United States	NCAA Division II	Lubbock Christian Lady Chaps	Southwestern Oklahoma State Bulldogs	95–85	Single-game final
United States	NCAA Division III	Thomas More Saints	Bowdoin Polar Bears	81–67	Single-game final
United States	NAIA Division I	Montana Western Bulldogs	Oklahoma City Stars	75–59	Single-game final
United States	NAIA Division II	Concordia Nebraska Bulldogs	Southeastern Fire	67–59	Single-game final

== Deaths ==
- January 1 — Larry Weinberg, 92, American NBA owner (Portland Trail Blazers).
- January 3 — Bob Burrow, 84, American college All-American (Kentucky) and NBA player (Minneapolis Lakers, Rochester Royals).
- January 6 — Ben Coleman, 57, American NBA player (New Jersey Nets, Philadelphia 76ers, Milwaukee Bucks).
- January 11 — Gus Ganakas, 92, American college coach (Michigan State).
- January 11 — Jumping Johnny Wilson, 91, American player (Harlem Globetrotters).
- January 19 — Ken Warzynski, 70, American college player (DePaul).
- January 20 — Jimmy Rayl, 77, American college All-American (Indiana) and ABA player (Indiana Pacers).
- January 26 — Dale Barnstable, 93, two-time college national champion at Kentucky (1948, 1949).
- February 3 — Irv Brown, 83, college basketball referee and announcer.
- February 14 — Clinton Wheeler, 59, American NBA player (Indiana Pacers, Miami Heat, Portland Trail Blazers).
- February 20 — Joe Gibbon, 83, All-American college player (Ole Miss).
- February 23 — Carl Meinhold, 92, American BAA player (Baltimore Bullets, Providence Steamrollers, Chicago Stags).
- February 28 — Jim Fritsche, 87, American NBA player (Minneapolis Lakers, Baltimore Bullets, Fort Wayne Pistons).
- March 9 — Alberto Bucci, 70, Italian coach (Fortitudo Bologna, Virtus Bologna, Scaligera Verona)
- March 10 — Alekos Spanoudakis, 90, Greek player (Olympiacos).
- March 12 — Tom Meyer, 96, American NBL player (Detroit Gems, Detroit Vagabonds).
- March 19 — Thanasis Giannakopoulos, 88, Greek executive (Panathinaikos B.C.).
- March 23 — Jacques Dessemme, 93, French Olympic player (1952).
- March 25 — Paul Dawkins, 61, American-Turkish player (Utah Jazz, Galatasaray).
- March 25 — Cal Ramsey, 81, American NBA player (St. Louis Hawks, New York Knicks, Syracuse Nationals).
- April 4 — Myer Skoog, 92, American NBA player (Minneapolis Lakers).
- April 14 — John MacLeod, 81, American college (Oklahoma, Notre Dame) and NBA (Phoenix Suns) coach.
- April 18 — Ken Buehler, 99, American NBL player (Sheboygan Red Skins, Fort Wayne Zollner Pistons).
- April 22 — Andy O'Donnell, 94, American NBA player (Baltimore Bullets).
- April 23 — Johnny Neumann, 68, American ABA (Memphis Tams, Virginia Squires) and NBA (Los Angeles Lakers) player.
- April 24 — Zoran Marojević, Serbian Olympic silver medalist (1968).
- April 25 — John Havlicek, 79, American Hall of Fame NBA player (Boston Celtics)
- May 3 — George Hanna, 90, Iraqi Olympic player (1948).
- May 3 — Andy Jick, 66, American public address announcer (Boston Celtics, Boston College).
- May 4 — Jumpin Jackie Jackson, 79, American player (Harlem Globetrotters).
- May 7 — Arnaldo Taurisano, 85, Italian coach (Cantù, Partenope Napoli, Brescia).
- May 15 — Rob Babcock, 66, American NBA executive (Minnesota Timberwolves, Toronto Raptors).
- May 22 — Tony Gennari, 76, Italian player (Varese, Libertas Forlì, Milano 1958).
- May 23 — Wilfredo Peláez, 88, Uruguayan Olympic bronze medalist (1952).
- May 25 — Rod Bramblett, 53, American college announcer (Auburn).
- June 4 — Billy Gabor, 97, American NBA player (Syracuse Nationals).
- June 11 — Yvan Delsarte, 90, Belgian Olympic player (1952).
- June 13 — Jiří Pospíšil, 68, Czech Olympic player (1972, 1976, 1980).
- June 16 — Kelly Coleman, 80, American player (Harlem Globetrotters, Chicago Majors, Baltimore Bullets).
- June 23 — Žarko Varajić, 67, Serbian Olympic silver medalist (1976).
- June 25 — Tony Barone, 72, American college (Creighton, Texas A&M) and NBA (Memphis Grizzlies) coach.
- June 27 — Vukica Mitić, 65, Serbian Olympic Bronze medalist (1980).
- June 28 — Borislav Džaković, 71, Serbian-Bosnian coach (KK Crvena zvezda, KK Partizan).
- July 5 — Lewis Lloyd, 60, American NBA player (Golden State Warriors, Houston Rockets, Philadelphia 76ers).
- July 6 — Charles Hardnett, 80, American NBA player (Baltimore Bullets).
- July 22 — Nikos Milas, 91, Greek player (Panathinaikos), coach (Panathinaikos, AEK Athens) and Olympian (1952).
- July 22 — Wayne See, 95, American NBA player (Waterloo Hawks).
- July 24 — Cathy Inglese, 60, American college coach (Vermont, Boston College, Rhode Island)
- July 28 — Howard Nathan, American NBA player (Atlanta Hawks).
- July 28 — Harrison Wilson Jr., 94, American college coach (Jackson State).
- July 29 — Max Falkenstien, 95, American college radio broadcaster (Kansas).
- August 10 — Cándido Sibilio, 60, Spanish player (FC Barcelona, Tau Vitoria) and Olympian (1980).
- August 12 — Jim Marsh, 73, American NBA player (Portland Trail Blazers) and broadcaster (Seattle SuperSonics).
- August 13 — Vladimír Ptáček, 64, Czech Olympic player (1976).
- August 16 — Penka Stoyanova, 69, Bulgarian Olympic silver (1980) and bronze (1976) medalist.
- August 19 — Mike Leaf, 58, American college coach (Winona State).
- August 20 — Kelsey Weems, 51, American player (Quad City Thunder, Hartford Hellcats, Yakima SunKings).
- August 22 — Tom Nissalke, 87, American NBA (Houston Rockets, Utah Jazz) and ABA (San Antonio Spurs) coach.
- August 25 — Jerry Rook, 75, American ABA player (New Orleans Buccaneers).
- September 2 — Rainer Pethran, 68, German Olympic player (1972).
- September 5 — Bob Rule, 75, American NBA player (Seattle SuperSonics, Philadelphia 76ers, Cleveland Cavaliers, Milwaukee Bucks).
- September 9 — Fred McLeod, 67, American NBA television and radio broadcaster (Detroit Pistons, Cleveland Cavaliers).
- September 22 — Courtney Cox Cole, 48, American college player (Indiana).
- September 22 — Andre Emmett, 37, American NBA player (Memphis Grizzlies, New Jersey Nets).
- September 22 — Nat Frazier, 84, American college (Morgan State, Bowie State) and WBL (Washington Metros) coach.
- September 23 — Gordon C. Stauffer, 89, American college coach (Washburn, Indiana State, Nicholls).
- September 24 — Mel Utley, 66, American college player (St. John's)
- September 27 — Gene Melchiorre, 92, American college All-American (Bradley).
- September 28 — Bill Ridley, 91, All-American college player (Illinois).
- September 29 — Glen Smith, 90, All-American college player (Utah).
- October 7 — Ed Kalafat, 86, American NBA player (Minneapolis Lakers).
- October 16 — Ed Beck, 83, American college national champion at Kentucky (1958).
- October 28 — Al Bianchi, 87, American NBA player (Syracuse Nationals) and coach (Seattle SuperSonics).
- October 28 — Ron Dunlap, 72, American player (Maccabi Tel Aviv).
- October 29 — Claude Constantino, 80, Senegalese Olympic player (1968).
- October 30 — Paul Crosby, 30, American college (Mississippi Valley State) player.
- November 2 — Bohumil Tomášek, 83, Czech Olympic player (1960).
- November 4 — Eli Pasquale, 59, Canadian Olympic player (1984, 1988).
- November 7 — Frank Saul, 95, American NBA player (Rochester Royals, Baltimore Bullets, Minneapolis Lakers).
- November 14 — Anthony Grundy, 40, American NBA player (Atlanta Hawks).
- November 14 — Charles Moir, 88, American college coach (Roanoke, Tulane, Virginia Tech).
- November 15 — Irv Noren, 94, American NBL player (Chicago American Gears).
- November 18 — Doug Smart, 82, All-American college player (Washington).
- November 19 — Bob Hallberg, 75, American college coach (Saint Xavier, Chicago State, UIC).
- November 20 — Wataru Misaka, 95, American NBA player (New York Knicks), national college champion at Utah (1944).
- December 5 — Ji Zhe, 33, Chinese player (Liaoning Flying Leopards, Beijing Ducks).
- December 13 — Carl Scheer, 82, American ABA, NBA (Charlotte Hornets, Denver Nuggets, Los Angeles Clippers) and CBA executive.
- December 13 — Linda Jónsdóttir, 63, Icelandic Úrvalsdeild kvenna (KR) and Icelandic national team player.
- December 20 — Rick Fisher, 71, American ABA player (Utah Stars, The Floridians)
- December 29 — LaDell Andersen, 90, American college (Utah State, BYU) and ABA (Utah Stars) coach.

== See also ==
- Timeline of women's basketball
