= Basketball at the SEA Games =

The sport of basketball has been played, for both men and women, at the SEA Games since 1977. Starting in 2019, the 3x3 version of the game was played, in addition to the usual 5-on-5 full strength teams.

The Philippines have dominated the men's events since the sport was played, winning 20 of the 23 events. Malaysia won 13 of the 21 women's events.

== Men's tournaments ==
=== 5-on-5 ===
Year	Host	Gold medal match			Bronze medal match		
Year	Host	Gold Medalists	Score	Silver Medalists	Bronze Medalists	Score	4th place
1977; Details	(Malaysia); Kuala Lumpur	Philippines	No playoffs	Malaysia	Thailand	No playoffs	Singapore
1979; Details	(Indonesia); Jakarta	Malaysia		Philippines	Singapore		Indonesia
1981; Details	(Philippines); Manila	Philippines	91–74	Malaysia	Thailand	99–90	Singapore
1983; Details	Singapore	Philippines	No playoffs	Malaysia	Thailand	No playoffs	Singapore
1985; Details	(Thailand); Bangkok	Philippines		Malaysia	Thailand		
1987; Details	(Indonesia); Jakarta	Philippines		Malaysia	Thailand		Indonesia
1989; Details	(Malaysia); Kuala Lumpur	Malaysia	No playoffs	Philippines	Thailand	No playoffs	Singapore
1991; Details	(Philippines); Quezon City	Philippines	77–72	Thailand	Malaysia	103–80	Singapore
1993; Details	Singapore	Philippines	71–66	Thailand	Indonesia		
1995; Details	(Thailand); Chiang Mai	Philippines	108–89	Thailand	Malaysia		Indonesia
1997; Details	(Indonesia); Jakarta	Philippines	96–86	Malaysia	Thailand	68–57	Indonesia
1999; Details	(Brunei); Bandar Seri Begawan	Philippines	89–69	Thailand	Indonesia	71–48	Malaysia
2001; Details	(Malaysia); Kuala Lumpur	Philippines	No playoffs	Indonesia	Malaysia	No playoffs	Thailand
2003; Details	(Vietnam); Ho Chi Minh City	Philippines	No playoffs	Thailand	Malaysia	No playoffs	Singapore
2005	(Philippines); Antipolo	Not held - Philippines, the host country, was suspended by FIBA.					
2007; Details	(Thailand); Nakhon Ratchasima	Philippines	No playoffs	Indonesia	Malaysia	No playoffs	Thailand
2009	(Laos); Vientiane	Not held - Laos, the host country, reduced the number of sports due to lack of facilities.					
2011; Details	(Indonesia); Jakarta	Philippines	85–57	Thailand	Indonesia	78–54	Malaysia
2013; Details	(Myanmar); Naypyidaw	Philippines	No playoffs	Thailand	Singapore	No playoffs	Malaysia
2015; Details	Singapore	Philippines	72–64	Indonesia	Singapore	54–49	Thailand
2017; Details	(Malaysia); Kuala Lumpur	Philippines	94–55	Indonesia	Thailand	65–55	Singapore
2019; Details	(Philippines); Pasay	Philippines	115–81	Thailand	Vietnam	86–71	Indonesia
2021; Details	(Vietnam); Hanoi	Indonesia	No playoffs	Philippines	Thailand	No playoffs	Vietnam
2023; Details	(Cambodia); Phnom Penh	Philippines	80–69	Cambodia	Thailand	83–69	Indonesia
2025; Details	(Thailand); Bangkok	Philippines	70–64	Thailand	Indonesia	80–68	Malaysia

==== Medal summary ====
Rank	Nation	Gold	Silver	Bronze	Total
1	Philippines (PHI)	20	3	0	23
2	Malaysia (MAS)	2	6	5	13
3	Indonesia (INA)	1	4	4	9
4	Thailand (THA)	0	9	10	19
5	Cambodia (CAM)	0	1	0	1
6	Singapore (SIN)	0	0	3	3
7	Vietnam (VIE)	0	0	1	1
Totals (7 entries)		23	23	23	69

==== Participating nations ====
Since the 1977 SEA Games.

Team	1977 (Malaysia)	1997 (Indonesia)	1999 (Brunei)	2001 (Malaysia)	2003 (Vietnam)	2007 (Thailand)	2011 (Indonesia)	2013 (Myanmar)	2015 (Singapore)	2017 (Malaysia)	2019 (Philippines)	2021 (Vietnam)	2023 (Cambodia)	2025 (Thailand)
Brunei			6th											
Cambodia			7th			5th	7th	6th	6th	7th	7th	7th	2nd	
Timor-Leste									9th					
Laos										8th			8th	
Indonesia		4th	3rd	2nd	5th	2nd	3rd	5th	2nd	2nd	4th	1st	4th	3rd
Malaysia	2nd	2nd	4th	3rd	3rd	3rd	4th	4th	5th	5th	6th	5th	5th	4th
Myanmar							8th	7th	8th	9th	8th			7th
Philippines	1st	1st	1st	1st	1st	1st	1st	1st	1st	1st	1st	2nd	1st	1st
Singapore	4th		5th	5th	4th		5th	3rd	3rd	4th	5th	6th	7th	6th
Thailand	3rd	3rd	2nd	4th	2nd	4th	2nd	2nd	4th	3rd	2nd	3rd	3rd	2nd
Vietnam				6th	6th		6th		7th	6th	3rd	4th	6th	5th
Nations	4	4	7	6	6	5	8	7	9	9	8	7	8	7

=== 3x3 ===
Year	Host	Gold medal match			Bronze medal match		
Year	Host	Gold Medalists	Score	Silver Medalists	Bronze Medalists	Score	4th place
2019; Details	(Philippines); San Juan	Philippines	21–9	Indonesia	Vietnam	21–17	Thailand
2021; Details	(Vietnam); Hanoi	Thailand	21–19	Vietnam	Philippines	14–10	Indonesia
2023; Details	(Cambodia); Phnom Penh	Cambodia	20–15	Philippines	Thailand	21–13	Vietnam
2025; Details	(Thailand); Bangkok	Thailand	21–18	Singapore	Malaysia	21–19	Philippines

==== Medal summary ====
Rank	Nation	Gold	Silver	Bronze	Total
1	Thailand	2	0	1	3
2	Philippines	1	1	1	3
3	Cambodia	1	0	0	1
4	Vietnam	0	1	1	2
5	Indonesia	0	1	0	1
5	Singapore	0	1	0	1
7	Malaysia	0	0	1	1
Totals (7 entries)		4	4	4	12

== Women's tournaments ==
=== 5-on-5 ===
Year	Host	Gold	Silver	Bronze
1977; Details	(Malaysia); Kuala Lumpur	Malaysia	Thailand	Singapore
1979; Details	(Indonesia); Jakarta	Malaysia	Thailand	Indonesia
1981; Details	(Philippines); Manila	Malaysia	Philippines	Thailand
1983; Details	Singapore	Malaysia	Philippines	Singapore
1985; Details	(Thailand); Bangkok	Malaysia	Philippines	Singapore
1987; Details	(Indonesia); Jakarta	Malaysia	Thailand	Philippines
1989; Details	(Malaysia); Kuala Lumpur	Thailand	Malaysia	Indonesia
1991; Details	(Philippines); Quezon City	Thailand	Indonesia	Malaysia
1993; Details	Singapore	Malaysia	Thailand	Philippines
1995; Details	(Thailand); Chiang Mai	Thailand	Philippines	Malaysia
1997; Details	(Indonesia); Jakarta	Malaysia	Thailand	Indonesia
1999	(Brunei); Bandar Seri Begawan	Not held		
2001; Details	(Malaysia); Kuala Lumpur	Malaysia	Thailand	Philippines
2003; Details	(Vietnam); Ho Chi Minh City	Malaysia	Singapore	Philippines
2005	(Philippines); Quezon City	Not held - Philippines, the host country, was suspended by FIBA.		
2007; Details	(Thailand); Nakhon Ratchasima	Malaysia	Thailand	Philippines
2009	(Laos); Vientiane	Not held - Laos, the host country, reduced the number of sports due to lack of facilities.		
2011; Details	(Indonesia); Jakarta	Thailand	Philippines	Malaysia
2013; Details	(Myanmar); Naypyidaw	Thailand	Philippines	Malaysia
2015; Details	Singapore	Malaysia	Indonesia	Thailand
2017; Details	(Malaysia); Kuala Lumpur	Malaysia	Thailand	Indonesia
2019; Details	(Philippines); Pasay	Philippines	Thailand	Indonesia
2021; Details	(Vietnam); Hanoi	Philippines	Indonesia	Malaysia
2023; Details	(Cambodia); Phnom Penh	Indonesia	Philippines	Malaysia
2025; Details	(Thailand); Bangkok	Philippines	Thailand	Indonesia

==== Medal summary ====
Rank	Nation	Gold	Silver	Bronze	Total
1	Malaysia	13	1	6	20
2	Thailand	5	10	2	17
3	Philippines	3	7	5	15
4	Indonesia	1	3	6	10
5	Singapore	0	1	3	4
Totals (5 entries)		22	22	22	66

=== 3x3 ===
Year	Host	Gold	Silver	Bronze
2019; Details	(Philippines); San Juan	Philippines	Thailand	Malaysia
2021; Details	(Vietnam); Hanoi	Thailand	Vietnam	Indonesia
2023; Details	(Cambodia); Phnom Penh	Vietnam	Philippines	Indonesia
2025; Details	(Thailand); Bangkok	Indonesia	Thailand	Malaysia

==== Medal summary ====
Rank	Nation	Gold	Silver	Bronze	Total
1	Thailand	1	2	0	3
2	Philippines	1	1	0	2
2	Vietnam	1	1	0	2
4	Indonesia	1	0	2	3
5	Malaysia	0	0	2	2
Totals (5 entries)		4	4	4	12

== Combined medal summary ==
Rank	Nation	Gold	Silver	Bronze	Total
1	Philippines (PHI)	25	12	6	43
2	Malaysia (MAS)	15	7	14	36
3	Thailand (THA)	8	21	13	42
4	Indonesia (INA)	3	8	12	23
5	Vietnam (VIE)	1	2	2	5
6	Cambodia (CAM)	1	1	0	2
7	Singapore (SIN)	0	2	6	8
Totals (7 entries)		53	53	53	159

== Note ==
* The 2005 men's basketball tournaments were originally scheduled to be held at the Ynares Center in Antipolo Province of Rizal, while the women's tournaments were to be held at the Blue Eagle Gym in Quezon City. Both Final Games were to be held at the Araneta Coliseum in Quezon City.

== See also ==
- Southeast Asia Basketball Association
- Basketball at the Asian Games
- FIBA Asia Championship
- Basketball at the West Asian Games
