= Indonesia women's national 3x3 team =

National basketball team of Indonesia

Indonesia
- FIBA zone: FIBA Asia
- National federation: PERBASI

FIBA 3x3 World Cup
- Appearances: 4
- Medals: None

FIBA 3x3 Asia Cup
- Appearances: 4
- Medals: Bronze: 2022
Medal record
FIBA 3x3 Asia Cup
Bronze medal – third place	2022 Singapore	Team
SEA Games
Gold medal – first place	2025 Bangkok and Chonburi	Team
Bronze medal – third place	2021 Hanoi	Team
Bronze medal – third place	2023 Phnom Penh	Team

The Indonesia women's national 3x3 team is a national basketball team of Indonesia, administered by the Indonesian Basketball Association.

It represents the country in international 3x3 (3 against 3) women's basketball competitions.

== Competitive record ==
=== FIBA 3x3 World Cup ===
FIBA 3x3 World Cup record
Year	Position	Pld	W	L
(Greece) 2012	Did not enter			
(Russia) 2014	17th place	5	1	4
(China) 2016	17th place	4	0	4
(France) 2017	Did not enter			
(Philippines) 2018	19th place	4	0	4
(Netherlands) 2019	20th place	4	0	4
(Belgium) 2022	Did not enter			
(Austria) 2023	Did not enter			
(Mongolia) 2025	Did not enter			
(Poland) 2026	To be determined			
(Singapore) 2027	To be determined			
Total	4/11	17	1	16

=== Islamic Solidarity Games ===
Islamic Solidarity Games record
Year	Position	Pld	W	L
(Saudi Arabia) 2005	Not held			
(Indonesia) 2013	Not held			
(Azerbaijan) 2017	Quarterfinals	5	2	3
(Turkey) 2021	Withdrew			

=== FIBA 3x3 Asia Cup ===
FIBA 3x3 Asia Cup record
Year	Position	Pld	W	L
(Qatar) 2013	Group stage	4	0	4
(Mongolia) 2017	Did not enter			
(China) 2018	7th place	3	1	2
(China) 2019	Did not enter			
(Singapore) 2022	3rd place	5	3	2
(Singapore) 2023	Did not enter			
(Singapore) 2024	Did not enter			
(Singapore) 2025	12th place	2	0	2
Total	4/8	14	4	10

=== Asian Games ===
Asian Games record
Year	Position	Pld	W	L
(Indonesia) 2018	6th place	4	2	2
(China) 2022	Did not participate			

=== SEA Games ===
SEA Games record
Year	Position	Pld	W	L
(Philippines) 2019	5th place	5	1	4
(Vietnam) 2021	3rd place	8	6	2
(Cambodia) 2023	3rd place	5	3	2
(Thailand) 2025	1st place	4	4	0
Total	4/4	22	14	8

== See also ==
- Indonesia men's national 3x3 team
- Indonesia women's national basketball team
