= Basketball at the 2025 SEA Games – Men's 3x3 tournament =

Men's 3x3 basketball tournament at the 2025 SEA Games
- Venue: Nimibutr Stadiuml Bangkok
- Dates: 10–11 December
- Nations: 8

The men's 3x3 basketball will be among the sports contested at the 2025 SEA Games at the Nimibutr Stadium in Bangkok, Thailand.

== Participating nations ==
- Indonesia
- Laos
- Malaysia
- Myanmar
- Philippines
- Singapore
- Thailand
- Vietnam

== Results ==
All times are Indochina Time (UTC+7)

=== Preliminary round ===
==== Group A ====
Pos	Team	Pld	W	L	PF	PA	PD	Qualification
1	Thailand (H)	3	3	0	59	39	+20	Advance to Semifinals
2	Singapore	3	2	1	54	41	+13	Advance to Semifinals
3	Indonesia	3	1	2	56	53	+3	
4	Myanmar	3	0	3	27	63	−36	

Source: 2025 SEA Games
(H) Hosts

10 December
13:15

Report

Singapore	21–5	Myanmar

Nimibutr Stadium, Bangkok

10 December
13:40

Report

Thailand	20–17	Indonesia

Nimibutr Stadium, Bangkok

10 December
17:45

Report

Myanmar	13–21	Indonesia

Nimibutr Stadium, Bangkok

10 December
18:10

Report

Singapore	13–18	Thailand

Nimibutr Stadium, Bangkok

11 December
11:50

Report

Indonesia	18–20	Singapore

Nimibutr Stadium, Bangkok

10 December
12:15

Report

Thailand	21–9	Myanmar

Nimibutr Stadium, Bangkok

==== Group B ====
Pos	Team	Pld	W	L	PF	PA	PD	Qualification
1	Philippines	3	3	0	63	44	+19	Advance to Semifinals
2	Malaysia	3	2	1	61	38	+23	Advance to Semifinals
3	Vietnam	3	1	2	48	51	−3	
4	Laos	3	0	3	24	63	−39	

Updated to match(es) played on 10 December 2025. Source: 2025 SEA Games

10 December
11:15

Report

Malaysia	21–5	Laos

Nimibutr Stadium, Bangkok

10 December
11:50

Report

Philippines	21–15	Vietnam

Nimibutr Stadium, Bangkok

10 December
15:55

Report

Laos	9–21	Vietnam

Nimibutr Stadium, Bangkok

10 December
16:20

Report

Malaysia	19–21	Philippines

Nimibutr Stadium, Bangkok

11 December
11:00

Report

Philippines	21–10	Laos

Nimibutr Stadium, Bangkok

11 December
11:25

Report

Vietnam	12–21	Malaysia

Nimibutr Stadium, Bangkok

=== Knockout round ===
Semifinals
A1	Thailand	21
B2	Malaysia	11
B1	Philippines	20
A2	Singapore	21

Final
Thailand	21
Singapore	18
Third place
Malaysia	21
Philippines	19

==== Semifinals ====
11 December
16:20

Thailand	21–11	Malaysia

Nimibutr Stadium, Bangkok

11 December
16:45

Philippines	20–21	Singapore

Nimibutr Stadium, Bangkok

==== Bronze medal match ====
11 December
17:45

Malaysia	21–19	Philippines

Nimibutr Stadium, Bangkok

==== Gold medal match ====
11 December
18:35

Thailand	21–18	Singapore

Nimibutr Stadium, Bangkok

== Final standings ==
Rank	Team
1st place, gold medalist(s)	Thailand
2nd place, silver medalist(s)	Singapore
3rd place, bronze medalist(s)	Malaysia
4	Philippines
5	Indonesia
6	Vietnam
7	Myanmar
8	Laos

== See also ==
- Women's 3x3 tournament
