= Indonesia men's national 3x3 team =

National 3x3 basketball team

Indonesia
- FIBA zone: FIBA Asia
- National federation: PERBASI

FIBA 3x3 World Cup
- Appearances: 4
- Medals: None

FIBA 3x3 Asia Cup
- Appearances: 2
- Medals: None
Medal record
SEA Games
Silver medal – second place	2019 Philippines	Team

The Indonesia men's national 3x3 team represents the country in international 3x3 basketball matches and is controlled by the Indonesian Basketball Association.

It represents the country in international 3x3 (3 against 3) basketball competitions.

== Competitive record ==
=== FIBA 3x3 World Cup ===
Year	Position	Pld	W	L
(Greece) 2012	Did not qualify			
(Russia) 2014	24th	5	0	5
(China) 2016	12th	4	2	2
(France) 2017	16th	4	1	3
(Philippines) 2018	20th	4	0	4
(Netherlands) 2019	Did not qualify			
(Belgium) 2022	Did not qualify			
(Austria) 2023	Did not qualify			
(Mongolia) 2025	Did not qualify			
(Poland) 2026	Did not qualify			
(Singapore) 2027	To be determined			
Total	4/11	17	3	14

=== FIBA 3x3 Asia Cup ===
Year	Position	Pld	W	L
(Qatar) 2013	Group Stage	3	1	2
(Mongolia) 2017	Did not qualify			
(China) 2018	Did not qualify			
(China) 2019	Group Stage	2	0	2
(Singapore) 2022	Did not qualify			
(Singapore) 2023	Did not qualify			
(Singapore) 2024	Did not qualify			
(Singapore) 2025	Did not qualify			
(Singapore) 2026	Did not qualify			
Total	2/9	5	1	4

=== Asian Games ===
Year	Pos	Pld	W	L
(Indonesia) 2018	11th	4	2	2

=== SEA Games ===
Year	Position	Pld	W	L
(Philippines) 2019	2nd	8	5	3
(Vietnam) 2021	4th	8	3	5
(Cambodia) 2023	5th	8	1	2
(Thailand) 2025	5th	3	1	2
Total	4/4	27	10	12

== See also ==
- Indonesia women's national 3x3 team
- Indonesia men's national basketball team
