= Basketball at the 2025 SEA Games – Women's 3x3 tournament =

Women's 3x3 basketball tournament at the 2025 SEA Games
- Venue: Nimibutr Stadiuml Bangkok
- Dates: 10–11 December
- Nations: 8

The women's 3x3 basketball will be among the sports contested at the 2025 SEA Games at the Nimibutr Stadium in Bangkok, Thailand.

== Participating nations ==
- Indonesia
- Laos
- Malaysia
- Philippines
- Singapore
- Thailand
- Vietnam

== Results ==
All times are Indochina Time (UTC+7)

=== Preliminary round ===
==== Group A ====
Pos	Team	Pld	W	L	PF	PA	PD	Qualification
1	Indonesia	2	2	0	40	25	+15	Advance to Semifinals
2	Malaysia	2	1	1	31	38	−7	Advance to Semifinals
3	Philippines	2	0	2	34	42	−8	

Source: 2025 SEA Games

10 December
11:00

Report

Philippines	15–21	Indonesia

Nimibutr Stadium, Bangkok

10 December
15:30

Report

Malaysia	10–19	Indonesia

Nimibutr Stadium, Bangkok

10 December
18:45

Report

Philippines	19–21	Malaysia

Nimibutr Stadium, Bangkok

==== Group B ====
Pos	Team	Pld	W	L	PF	PA	PD	Qualification
1	Thailand	3	3	0	58	30	+28	Advance to Semifinals
2	Vietnam	3	2	1	58	40	+18	Advance to Semifinals
3	Singapore	3	1	2	49	40	+9	
4	Laos	3	0	3	9	64	−55	

Source: 2025 SEA Games

10 December
12:25

Report

Thailand	17–16	Vietnam

Nimibutr Stadium, Bangkok

10 December
12:50

Report

Singapore	21–0	Laos

Nimibutr Stadium, Bangkok

10 December
16:55

Report

Singapore	12–19	Thailand

Nimibutr Stadium, Bangkok

10 December
17:20

Report

Laos	7–21	Vietnam

Nimibutr Stadium, Bangkok

10 December
19:10

Report

Vietnam	21–16	Singapore

Nimibutr Stadium, Bangkok

10 December
19:35

Report

Thailand	22–2	Laos

Nimibutr Stadium, Bangkok

=== Knockout round ===
Semifinals
A1	Indonesia	20
B2	Vietnam	18
B1	Thailand	20
A2	Malaysia	19

Final
Indonesia	20
Thailand	18
Third place
Vietnam	20
Malaysia	21

==== Semifinals ====
11 December
15:30

Indonesia	20–18	Vietnam

Nimibutr Stadium, Bangkok

11 December
15:55

Thailand	20–19	Malaysia

Nimibutr Stadium, Bangkok

==== Bronze medal match ====
11 December
17:20

Vietnam	20–21	Malaysia

Nimibutr Stadium, Bangkok

==== Gold medal match ====
11 December
18:10

Indonesia	20–18	Thailand

Nimibutr Stadium, Bangkok

== Final standings ==
Rank	Team
1st place, gold medalist(s)	Indonesia
2nd place, silver medalist(s)	Thailand
3rd place, bronze medalist(s)	Malaysia
4	Vietnam
5	Singapore
6	Philippines
7	Laos

== See also ==
- Men's 3x3 tournament
