= 2019–20 Division 1 =

2019–20 Maltese Division 1
- Season: 2019–20
- Duration: 16 November 2019 – May 2020
- Teams: 5

The 2019–20 Maltese Division 1 season, is the premier men's basketball competition in Malta.

== Competition format ==
Five teams joined the regular season and competed in a double-legged round-robin tournament. The four best qualified teams of the regular season joined the playoffs.

== Regular season ==
=== League table ===
Pos	Team	Pld	W	L	PF	PA	PD	Pts	Qualification
1	Athleta	8	6	2	694	598	+96	14	Qualification to the playoffs
2	Starlites GIG	8	6	2	708	670	+38	14	Qualification to the playoffs
3	Hibernians	9	5	4	763	722	+41	14	Qualification to the playoffs
4	Depiro	8	2	6	686	757	−71	10	Qualification to the playoffs
5	BUPA Luxol	7	1	6	536	640	−104	8	

Updated to match(es) played on 8 March 2020. Source:

=== Results ===
Home \ Away	ATH	BUP	DEP	HIB	STA	ATH	BUP	DEP	HIB	STA
Athleta	—	78–56	118–95	66–63	72–76	—				
BUPA Luxol		—	70–87	65–83	83–91		—			
Depiro	87–99	86–89	—	84–82		65–104		—		
Hibernians	87–74	110–77	96–88	—	87–84				—	77–89
Starlites GIG	69–83	105–96	99–94	95–78	—					—

Updated to match(es) played on 8 March 2020. Source:
Legend: Blue = home team win; Red = away team win.
