= 2018–19 Maltese Division 1 =

- Season: 2018–19
- Duration: 11 November 2018 – 8 May 2019
- Teams: 7

Finals
- Champions: Athleta (11th title)
- Runners-up: Hibernians

The 2018–19 Maltese Division 1 season, is the premier men's basketball competition in Malta.

== Competition format ==
Seven teams joined the regular season and competed in a double-legged round-robin tournament. The four best qualified teams of the regular season joined the playoffs.

== Regular season ==
=== League table ===
Pos	Team	Pld	W	L	PF	PA	PD	Pts	Qualification
1	Athleta	11	8	3	940	813	+127	19	Qualification to the playoffs
2	Hibernians	10	8	2	875	723	+152	18	Qualification to the playoffs
3	Starlites GIG	10	8	2	958	806	+152	18	Qualification to the playoffs
4	BUPA Luxol	11	4	7	920	911	+9	15	Qualification to the playoffs
5	Floriana MCP Carparks	10	5	5	804	826	−22	15	
6	Depiro	10	3	7	783	800	−17	13	
7	Balkan Fusion	10	0	10	552	953	−401	10	

Updated to match(es) played on 20 March 2019. Source:

=== Results ===
Home \ Away	ATH	BFU	BUP	DEP	FLO	HIB	STA
Athleta	—	98–61	84–72	101–90	99–108	68–79	81–93
Balkan Fusion	39–90	—	67–128			53–110	83–129
BUPA Luxol	77–79	93–72	—	72–71	74–79	65–84	86–90
Depiro	88–97	83–70	82–95	—	100–102	76–85	99–108
Floriana MCP Carparks	88–78	108–59	75–70	116–82	—	77–91	72–96
Hibernians	70–94	94–48	98–67	83–86	86–80	—	103–88
Starlites GIG	78–87	97–56	114–86	84–76	92–57	74–79	—

Source: Malta Basketball Association
Legend: Blue = home team win; Red = away team win.

== Playoffs ==
The semifinals were played in a best-of-three-games format, while the finals in a best-of-five (1-1-1-1-1) format.

=== Bracket ===
Semi-finals
Hibernians	2
Floriana MCP Carparks	0
Athleta	2
Starlites GIG	0

Finals
Hibernians	0
Athleta	3

=== Semi-finals ===
Team 1	Series	Team 2	Game 1	Game 2	Game 3
Hibernians	2–0	Floriana MCP Carparks	86–54	86–80	
Athleta	2–0	Starlites GIG	82–71	88–78	

=== Finals ===
Team 1	Series	Team 2	Game 1	Game 2	Game 3	Game 4	Game 5
Hibernians	0–3	Athleta	85–87	73–90	88–93		
