= Basketball at the 2021 SEA Games – Men's tournament =

Men's basketball tournament at the 2021 SEA Games
- Venue: Thanh Trì District Sporting Hall, Hanoi
- Dates: 16–22 May 2022
- Nations: 7

Medalists
gold medal	Indonesia
silver medal	Philippines
bronze medal	Thailand

The men's basketball tournament at the 2021 SEA Games was held at the Thanh Trì District Sporting Hall in Hanoi, Vietnam from 16 to 22 May 2022.

== Competition schedule ==
The following is the competition schedule for the men's basketball competitions:

RR	Round-robin

Mon 16	Tue 17	Wed 18	Thu 19	Fri 20	Sat 21	Sun 22
RR	RR	RR	RR	RR	RR	RR

== Participating nations ==
- Cambodia
- Indonesia
- Malaysia
- Philippines
- Singapore
- Thailand
- Vietnam

== Competition format ==
The seven teams compete in a single round-robin. Three highest-ranked teams will be awarded gold, silver and bronze medal.

== Venue ==
The regular 5-on-5 basketball tournament was held at the Thanh Trì District Sporting Hall in Hanoi.

== Results ==
=== Round-robin ===
All times are Vietnam Standard Time (UTC+7)

Pos	Team	Pld	W	L	PF	PA	PD	Pts	Final Result
1	Indonesia	6	6	0	537	420	+117	12	Gold medal
2	Philippines	6	5	1	520	331	+189	11	Silver medal
3	Thailand	6	4	2	524	362	+162	10	Bronze medal
4	Vietnam (H)	6	3	3	470	483	−13	9	
5	Malaysia	6	2	4	392	470	−78	8	
6	Singapore	6	1	5	373	492	−119	7	
7	Cambodia	6	0	6	271	529	−258	6	

Source: 2021 SEA Games
Rules for classification: (1) Tournament points, (2) Head-to-head tournament points, (3) Head-to-head goal average, (4) Overall goal average, (5) Drawing of lots
(H) Hosts

16 May 2022
11:00

Box Score

Malaysia	92–95 (OT)	Indonesia
Scoring by quarter: 22–24, 15–30, 19–20, 28–10, Overtime: 8–11
Pts: Ting 34; Rebs: A. Liew, Ting 9 Asts: Teo 4		Pts: Jawato 27; Rebs: Xzavierro 18; Asts: Prastawa 7

Thanh Trì District Sporting Hall, Hanoi

16 May 2022
15:00

Box Score

Philippines	76–73	Thailand
Scoring by quarter: 13–21, 25–13, 20–18, 18–21
Pts: Fajardo 28; Rebs: Fajardo 12; Asts: T. Ravena 9		Pts: Soonthornchote 18; Rebs: Soonthornchote 9 Asts: Morgan 4

Thanh Trì District Sporting Hall, Hanoi

16 May 2022
19:00

Box Score

Vietnam	87–55	Cambodia
Scoring by quarter: 26–8, 27–18, 14–13, 20–16
Pts: Juzang 24; Rebs: Young 13; Asts: Đinh T.S. 6		Pts: Johnathan 15; Rebs: Vetou 8 Asts: Johnathan 3

Thanh Trì District Sporting Hall, Hanoi

17 May 2022
15:00

Box Score

Thailand	92–45	Malaysia
Scoring by quarter: 26–11, 15–10, 28–13, 23–11
Pts: Jakrawan 16; Rebs: Morgan 11; Asts: Jakongmee 7		Pts: Lee, Ting 8 Rebs: Kwaan 6 Asts: A. Liew, Wong 3

Thanh Trì District Sporting Hall, Hanoi

17 May 2022
17:00

Box Score

Cambodia	32–100	Philippines
Scoring by quarter: 9–32, 8–25, 6–14, 9–29
Pts: Michael 8 Rebs: Pisey 8 Asts: Michael, Vetou 2		Pts: Lopez 17; Rebs: Go 12; Asts: K. Ravena 3

Thanh Trì District Sporting Hall, Hanoi

17 May 2022
19:00

Box Score

Singapore	83–86	Vietnam
Scoring by quarter: 27–21, 23–22, 19–20, 14–23
Pts: Kwek 27; Rebs: Goh 10; Asts: Liew 6		Pts: Juzang 29; Rebs: Đinh T.T., Young 6 Asts: N. Vinh 5

Thanh Trì District Sporting Hall, Hanoi
Attendance: 25

18 May 2022
11:00

Box Score

Indonesia	78–75	Thailand
Scoring by quarter: 19–13, 12–18, 26–20, 21–24
Pts: Jawato 21; Rebs: Jawato, Xzavierro 13; Asts: Jawato 4		Pts: Soonthornchote 41; Rebs: Morgan 6 Asts: Muangboon 4

Thanh Trì District Sporting Hall, Hanoi

18 May 2022
15:00

Box Score

Philippines	88–37	Singapore
Scoring by quarter: 17–7, 26–10, 18–10, 27–10
Pts: Pogoy 19		Pts: Raj 8

Thanh Trì District Sporting Hall, Hanoi

18 May 2022
19:00

Box Score

Malaysia	62–41	Cambodia
Scoring by quarter: 21–13, 15–5, 13–19, 13–4
Pts: Kuek 19; Rebs: Ting 10; Asts: Ong 6		Pts: Johnathan 13; Rebs: Michael 6 Asts: Vetou 3

Thanh Trì District Sporting Hall, Hanoi

19 May 2022
11:00

Box Score

Cambodia	44–94	Indonesia
Scoring by quarter: 14–32, 7–17, 15–16, 8–29
Pts: Hu 11; Rebs: Chin 6 Asts: Michael 6		Pts: Diagne 14; Rebs: Diagne 12; Asts: Kokodiputra 8

Thanh Trì District Sporting Hall, Hanoi

19 May 2022
15:00

Box Score

Singapore	58–75	Malaysia
Scoring by quarter: 14–17, 13–20, 16–16, 15–22
Pts: Kwek 13; Rebs: Goh 9 Asts: 3 players 2		Pts: Ting 23; Rebs: A. Liew 10; Asts: Kwaan 4

Thanh Trì District Sporting Hall, Hanoi

19 May 2022
19:00

Box Score

Vietnam	60–88	Philippines
Scoring by quarter: 17-20, 16-22, 14-20, 13-26
Pts: Dierker 20; Rebs: Young 5 Asts: Đinh T.S., Young 4		Pts: Fajardo 25; Rebs: T. Ravena 13; Asts: T. Ravena, K. Ravena 7

Thanh Trì District Sporting Hall, Hanoi

20 May 2022
15:00

Box Score

Thailand	105–37	Cambodia
Scoring by quarter: 29–8, 20–5, 25–11, 31–13
Pts: Klahan 20; Rebs: Chungyampin 13; Asts: Jaisanuk 9		Pts: Johnathan 8 Rebs: Johnathan, Pisey 4 Asts: Tep, Te 2

Thanh Trì District Sporting Hall, Hanoi

20 May 2022
17:00

Box Score

Indonesia	91–61	Singapore
Scoring by quarter: 22–18, 26–13, 22–11, 21–22
Pts: Prastawa 20; Rebs: Xzavierro 9 Asts: Saputera 4		Pts: Kwek 21; Rebs: Goh 8 Asts: Goh 3

Thanh Trì District Sporting Hall, Hanoi

20 May 2022
19:00

Box Score

Malaysia	74–97	Vietnam
Scoring by quarter: 12–27, 26–22, 15–26, 21–22
Pts: Wong 19; Rebs: Ting 9 Asts: Ting 5		Pts: Juzang 19; Rebs: Juzang 11; Asts: Young 6

Thanh Trì District Sporting Hall, Hanoi

21 May 2022
11:00

Box Score

Philippines	87–44	Malaysia
Scoring by quarter: 19–10, 20–12, 29–11, 19–11
Pts: T. Ravena 17; Rebs: Pogoy 10; Asts: T. Ravena 5		Pts: 3 players 8 Rebs: Kuek, Ting 5 Asts: Ting 4

Thanh Trì District Sporting Hall, Hanoi

21 May 2022
15:00

Box Score

Singapore	53–90	Thailand
Scoring by quarter: 10–24, 10–24, 22–18, 11–24
Pts: Kwek 17; Rebs: Low 8 Asts: Kwek 4		Pts: Soonthornchote 31; Rebs: Jakrawan, Klahan 9 Asts: Jakongmee 5

Thanh Trì District Sporting Hall, Hanoi

21 May 2022
19:00

Box Score

Vietnam	67–94	Indonesia
Scoring by quarter: 15–30, 23–25, 13–24, 16–15
Pts: N. Vinh 13; Rebs: Đinh T.S. 5 Asts: Đinh T.S. 5		Pts: Xzavierro 22; Rebs: Xzavierro 15; Asts: Prastawa 6

Thanh Trì District Sporting Hall, Hanoi

22 May 2022
11:00

Box Score

Cambodia	62–81	Singapore
Scoring by quarter: 15–11, 12–22, 16–27, 19–21
Pts: Tep 16; Rebs: Johnathan 6 Asts: Michael, Vetou 3		Pts: Liew 19; Rebs: Goh 13; Asts: Kwek 7

Thanh Trì District Sporting Hall, Hanoi

22 May 2022
15:00

Box Score

Indonesia	85–81	Philippines
Scoring by quarter: 18–14, 18–18, 27–28, 22–21
Pts: Bolden 18; Rebs: Bolden 10; Asts: Prastawa 7		Pts: Wright 23; Rebs: Fajardo 9 Asts: 3 players 4

Thanh Trì District Sporting Hall, Hanoi

22 May 2022
19:00

Box Score

Thailand	89–73	Vietnam
Scoring by quarter: 21–16, 22–15, 26–23, 20–19
Pts: Soonthornchote 35; Rebs: Jakrawan 11; Asts: Soonthornchote 8		Pts: Juzang 23; Rebs: Dierker 10; Asts: Đinh T.S. 5

Thanh Trì District Sporting Hall, Hanoi

== Final standings ==
Rank	Team
1st place, gold medalist(s)	Indonesia
2nd place, silver medalist(s)	Philippines
3rd place, bronze medalist(s)	Thailand
4	Vietnam
5	Malaysia
6	Singapore
7	Cambodia

== See also ==
- Women's tournament
