= Cambodia men's national 3x3 team =

National 3x3 basketball team

Cambodia
- Joined FIBA: 1958
- FIBA zone: FIBA Asia
- National federation: Cambodian Basketball Federation

The Cambodian men's national 3x3 team represents the country in international 3x3 basketball matches and is governed by the Cambodian Basketball Federation.

The team made their debut at the 2019 Southeast Asian Games in the Philippines. Fielding an all-local team, they lost all of their six games. In cooperation with the USA-Cambodia Basketball Association (UCBA), the roster was overhauled for the 2021 edition in Vietnam where they field Cambodian-American players. They were still unable to make a podium finish.

At the 2023 SEA Games hosted at home, Cambodia's four-man roster had three naturalized players taking advantage of the tournament's regulation which allowed for such setup. The team was able to clinch a gold medal after they beat the Philippines in the final.

== Tournament record ==
=== Southeast Asian Games ===
Year	Position	Pld	W	L
(Philippines) 2019	7th	6	0	6
(Vietnam) 2021	Non-podium finish	–	–	–
(Cambodia) 2023	1st	5	5	0
Total				
