= Derrick Michael Xzavierro =

Indonesian basketball player (born 2003)

Derrick Michael
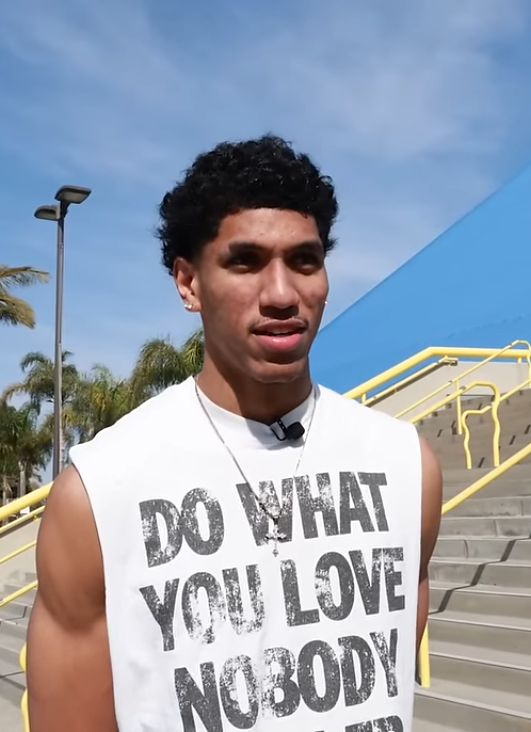
- Xzavierro in 2025

No. 8 – Saga Ballooners
- Position: Power forward / center
- League: B.League

Personal information
- Born: 1 April 2003 (age 23) Jakarta, Indonesia
- Listed height: 6 ft 10 in (2.08 m)
- Listed weight: 107 kg (236 lb)

Career information
- High school: SMAN 116 (Jakarta, Indonesia)
- College: Grand Canyon (2022–2024); Long Beach State (2024–2026)
- Playing career: 2026–present

Career history
- 2026-present: Saga Ballooners
Medals
Men's basketball
Representing Indonesia
Southeast Asian Games
Gold medal – first place	2021 Vietnam	Team
Bronze medal – third place	2025 Thailand	Team

Derrick Michael Xzavierro (born 1 April 2003), also known by his initials DMX, is an Indonesian professional basketball player for the Saga Ballooners of the Japanese B.League. He played college basketball for the Long Beach State Beach and the Grand Canyon Antelopes. He is known as the first-ever Indonesian citizen to earn a Division I athletic scholarship.

== Early life and career ==
Xzavierro, born in Jakarta, fell in love with basketball since the fifth grade, and in 2017 he was selected to be a part of the Jr. NBA. In high school he attended SMAN 116 Jakarta, or Ragunan High School, which is known for producing the nation's top basketball talents. After graduating high school, by the end of October 2020, Xzavierro had accepted a scholarship offer from the NBA Global Academy at the Australia Institute of Sport (AIS) making him the first Indonesian-born joining the academy. But getting him from Indonesia to Australia would prove challenging because of the tight travel restrictions in the world throughout the pandemic. On April 27, 2020, he finally flew to Sydney. From 2020 till 2022 he attended the academy that situated in Canberra, Australia, while also taking special English classes by a private tutor for his academic needs for college.

== College career ==
=== Grand Canyon ===
Xzavierro committed to play for the Grand Canyon Antelopes on April 14, 2022. Making him the first-ever male Indonesian-born to play in an NCAA Division I men's basketball tournament. The Antelopes redshirted Xzavierro in the 2022–23 season to continue his development. His highest-scoring game was on 27 December 2023, recording 12 points, 11 rebounds, 3 assists and 1 block in a win against Bethesda University. On 5 April 2024, Xzavierro announced that he entered the NCAA transfer portal.

=== Long Beach State ===
On May 3, 2024, Xzavierro transferred to Long Beach State. On his first season for the Beach, Xzavierro played at every match and averaged 5.2 points, 6.8 rebounds, and 0.6 assists. On January 31, 2025, against UC Irvine, Xzavierro made 14 rebounds and 12 points. Unfortunately they lost on overtime with the score 80 to 75.

== Professional career ==
=== Saga Ballooners ===
On June 12, 2026, Xzavierro joins the Saga Ballooners of the B.League for his first professional stint.

== National team career ==
In 2020, then-18-year-old Xzavierro was called up to the senior Indonesia men's national basketball team during the FIBA Asia Cup 2021 qualifiers against South Korea, at his debut he only managed to play 2 minutes, recording two rebounds, Xzavierro told reporters he was shocked to have played at all. Most recently he represented Indonesia in the 2022 FIBA Asia Cup and averaged 8.5 points, 8 rebounds and 0.5 assists. Xzavierro was also part of team Indonesia first-ever gold medal at the 2021 SEA Games after defeating reigning champions, Gilas Pilipinas in the final with a score of 85–81.

== Personal life ==
His father, Lazare Heumi, is from Cameroon and his mother, Eva Paulina, is from North Sumatra, Indonesia.
