= 2024–25 FIBA Europe Cup =

European basketball competition

- Season: 2024–25
- Dates: Qualifying: 24–27 September 2024; Competition proper: 8 October 2024–23 April 2025
- Games played: 182
- Teams: Competition proper: 40 (from 22 countries); Total: 44 (from 25 countries)

Finals
- Champions: (Spanish Basketball Federation) Surne Bilbao Basket (1st title)
- Runners-up: (Hellenic Basketball Federation) PAOK mateco
- Semi-finalists: (French Federation of Basketball) Cholet (French Federation of Basketball) JDA Bourgogne Dijon
- Finals MVP: (Sweden) Melwin Pantzar

Statistical leaders
Points	(United States) Marcquise Reed	18.2
Rebounds	(Bulgaria) Yordan Minchev	7.0
Assists	(Iceland) Elvar Friðriksson	6.7
Efficiency	(United States) Marcquise Reed	18.0

The 2024–25 FIBA Europe Cup was the 10th season of the FIBA Europe Cup, a European basketball competition for clubs launched by FIBA Europe.

== Team allocation ==
A total of 44 teams from 25 of the 50 FIBA Europe member associations participated in the 2024–25 FIBA Europe Cup season, out of which 15 teams of the Basketball Champions League qualifying rounds had opted in to participate in the FIBA Europe Cup as they do not reached the Basketball Champions League regular season, out of which a maximum of 18 could join the regular season.

=== Teams ===
The labels in the parentheses show how each team qualified for the place of its starting round:

- 1st, 2nd, 3rd, etc.: League position after eventual Playoffs
- CL QR: Transferred from Champions League qualifying rounds

Qualified teams for 2024–25 FIBA Europe Cup (by entry round)
Regular season
(German Basketball Federation) MHP Riesen Ludwigsburg (8th)	(French Federation of Basketball) ESSM Le Portel (8th)	(French Federation of Basketball) Cholet (CL QR)
(German Basketball Federation) Löwen Braunschweig (12th)	(Hungarian Basketball Federation) NHSZ Szolnoki Olajbányász (2nd)	(Georgian Basketball Federation) Kutaisi 2010 (CL QR)
(Polish Basketball Federation) PGE Spójnia Stargard (4th)	(Portuguese Basketball Federation) Porto (2nd)	(British Basketball) Caledonia Gladiators (CL QR)
(Polish Basketball Federation) Anwil Włocławek (5th)	(Romanian Basketball Federation) Argeș Pitești (4th)	(Hellenic Basketball Federation) PAOK mateco (CL QR)
(Turkish Basketball Federation) Bursaspor Yörsan (9th)	(Spanish Basketball Federation) Casademont Zaragoza (12th)	(Italian Basketball Federation) Banco di Sardegna Sassari (CL QR)
(Turkish Basketball Federation) Tofaş (11th)	(Azerbaijan Basketball Federation) Sabah (CL QR)	(Basketball Federation of Kosovo) Trepça (CL QR)
(Basketball Belgium) Hubo Limburg United (3rd)	(Basketball Belgium) Windrose Giants Antwerp (CL QR)	(Romanian Basketball Federation) CSM CSU Oradea (CL QR)
(Bulgarian Basketball Federation) Balkan (2nd)	(Bulgarian Basketball Federation) Rilski Sportist (CL QR)	(Slovak Basketball Association) Patrioti Levice (CL QR)
(Cyprus Basketball Federation) Petrolina AEK Larnaca (2nd)	(Cyprus Basketball Federation) Keravnos (CL QR)	(Swedish Basketball Federation) Norrköping Dolphins (CL QR)
(Estonian Basketball Association) Pärnu Sadam (4th)	(Estonian Basketball Association) Kalev/Cramo (CL QR)	(Swiss Basketball) Fribourg Olympic (CL QR)
Qualifying round
(Basketball Belgium) Spirou (5th)	(Hungarian Basketball Federation) Alba Fehérvár (3rd)	(Romanian Basketball Federation) CSM Constanța (7th)
(Croatian Basketball Federation) Dinamo Zagreb (4th)	(Basketball Federation of Kosovo) Peja (3rd)	(Slovak Basketball Association) Prievidza (3rd)
(Cyprus Basketball Federation) Anorthosis Famagusta (3rd)	(Lithuanian Basketball Federation) Neptūnas (6th)	(Spanish Basketball Federation) Surne Bilbao Basket (13th)
(French Federation of Basketball) JDA Bourgogne Dijon (9th)	(Malta Basketball Association) Visit Malta Starlites Naxxar (1st)	(Basketball Federation of Ukraine) Dnipro (1st)
(Hellenic Basketball Federation) Maroussi (9th)	(Portuguese Basketball Federation) Sporting CP (5th)	

== Round and draw dates ==
The schedule of the competition was as follows.

Schedule for 2024–25 FIBA Europe Cup
Phase	Round	Draw date	First leg	Second leg
Qualifying round		19 July 2024	24 September 2024	26–27 September 2024
Regular season	Round 1	19 July 2024	8–9 October 2024	
Regular season	Round 2	19 July 2024	15–16 October 2024	
Regular season	Round 3	19 July 2024	22–23 October 2024	
Regular season	Round 4	19 July 2024	29–30 October 2024	
Regular season	Round 5	19 July 2024	18 October, 5–6 November 2024	
Regular season	Round 6	19 July 2024	22 October, 12–13 November 2024	
Second round	Round 1	19 July 2024	3–4 December 2024	
Second round	Round 2	19 July 2024	10–12 December 2024	
Second round	Round 3	19 July 2024	7–9 January 2025	
Second round	Round 4	19 July 2024	14–15 January 2025	
Second round	Round 5	19 July 2024	28–29 January 2025	
Second round	Round 6	19 July 2024	4–5 February 2025	
Play-offs	Quarter-finals	19 July 2024	5 March 2025	12 March 2025
Play-offs	Semi-finals	19 July 2024	26 March 2025	2 April 2025
Play-offs	Finals	19 July 2024	16 April 2025	23 April 2025

== Qualifying round ==
The qualifying round took place from 24 to 27 September 2024 in two-legged ties in which the series winners advanced to the regular season. As clubs that have opted in from the Basketball Champions League qualifying rounds could qualify to the Basketball Champions League regular season, this led to three additional spots in the regular season of the FIBA Europe Cup opening up to be filled by the best loser series in the qualifying round.

It was the first time that basketball team from Malta will participate in international competition since the 1992–93 FIBA European Cup.

Team 1	Agg.	Team 2	1st leg	2nd leg
JDA Bourgogne Dijon (French Federation of Basketball)	200–141	(Croatian Basketball Federation) Dinamo Zagreb	95–84	105–57
Sporting CP (Portuguese Basketball Federation)	148–141	(Basketball Belgium) Spirou	69–69	79–72
Alba Fehérvár (Hungarian Basketball Federation)	189–186	(Slovak Basketball Association) Prievidza	85–102	104–84
Dnipro (Basketball Federation of Ukraine)	142–153	(Romanian Basketball Federation) CSM Constanța	71–69	71–84
Anorthosis Famagusta (Cyprus Basketball Federation)	168–149	(Malta Basketball Association) Visit Malta Starlites Naxxar	81–74	87–75
Peja (Basketball Federation of Kosovo)	156–204	(Hellenic Basketball Federation) Maroussi	75–98	81–106
Surne Bilbao Basket (Spanish Basketball Federation)	169–125	(Lithuanian Basketball Federation) Neptūnas	74–66	95–59

Source: FIBA

=== Lucky losers ===
The additional spots were made available after SL Benfica, Aliaga Petkim and Telekom Baskets Bonn qualified for the Basketball Champions League. The three lucky losers were determined by the best loser series from the FIBA Europe Cup Qualifying Round in accordance to Section D of the Official Basketball Rules.

Pos	Team	PF	PA	PD	Qualification
1	(Slovak Basketball Association) Prievidza	186	189	−3	Advance to regular season
2	(Basketball Belgium) Spirou	141	148	−7	Advance to regular season
3	(Basketball Federation of Ukraine) Dnipro	142	153	−11	Advance to regular season
4	(Malta Basketball Association) Visit Malta Starlites Naxxar	149	168	−19	
5	(Lithuanian Basketball Federation) Neptūnas	125	169	−44	
6	(Basketball Federation of Kosovo) Peja	156	204	−48	
7	(Croatian Basketball Federation) Dinamo Zagreb	141	200	−59	

Source: FIBA

== Regular season ==
The regular season was played by 40 teams divided into 10 groups of four in which 15 teams received direct spots, 10 teams advanced from the qualifying round and 15 teams came from the Basketball Champions League qualifying rounds. It began on 8 October 2024 and concluded on 13 November 2024. In each group, teams played against each other home-and-away in a round-robin format. And the end of the regular season, the top team from each regular season group plus the best six second-placed teams advanced to the second round, while the rest of the teams were eliminated after the regular season.

No team from Israel participated in the competition for the second season in-a-row.

=== Group A ===
Pos	Team	Pld	W	L	PF	PA	PD	Pts	Qualification	TOF	BLB	AEK	KER
1	(Turkish Basketball Federation) Tofaş	6	6	0	586	489	+97	12	Advance to second round	—	102–90	99–81	93–61
2	(German Basketball Federation) Löwen Braunschweig	6	3	3	515	487	+28	9		92–97	—	89–59	78–71
3	(Cyprus Basketball Federation) Petrolina AEK Larnaca	6	2	4	426	514	−88	8		69–96	63–72	—	82–73
4	(Cyprus Basketball Federation) Keravnos	6	1	5	507	544	−37	7		96–99	95–94	91–92	—

Source: FIBA
Legend: Blue = home team win; Red = away team win.

=== Group B ===
Pos	Team	Pld	W	L	PF	PA	PD	Pts	Qualification	ZAR	LEV	BUR	ANO
1	(Spanish Basketball Federation) Casademont Zaragoza	6	5	1	542	491	+51	11	Advance to second round	—	92–71	106–84	92–77
2	(Slovak Basketball Association) Patrioti Levice	6	4	2	514	487	+27	10		96–80	—	63–78	100–68
3	(Turkish Basketball Federation) Bursaspor Yörsan	6	3	3	513	504	+9	9		87–89	97–101	—	86–79
4	(Cyprus Basketball Federation) Anorthosis Famagusta	6	0	6	438	525	−87	6		76–83	72–83	66–81	—

Source: FIBA
Legend: Blue = home team win; Red = away team win.

=== Group C ===
Pos	Team	Pld	W	L	PF	PA	PD	Pts	Qualification	CHO	FRI	ANT	CSM
1	(French Federation of Basketball) Cholet	6	6	0	569	445	+124	12	Advance to second round	—	90–75	90–77	106–63
2	(Swiss Basketball) Fribourg Olympic	6	4	2	554	479	+75	10	Advance to second round	81–85	—	102–84	103–76
3	(Basketball Belgium) Windrose Giants Antwerp	6	2	4	481	526	−45	8		81–94	67–89	—	84–81
4	(Romanian Basketball Federation) CSM Constanța	6	0	6	435	589	−154	6		68–104	77–104	70–88	—

Source: FIBA
Legend: Blue = home team win; Red = away team win.

=== Group D ===
Pos	Team	Pld	W	L	PF	PA	PD	Pts	Qualification	SAS	ANW	SCP	DNI
1	(Italian Basketball Federation) Banco di Sardegna Sassari	6	6	0	517	406	+111	12	Advance to second round	—	69–66	88–71	94–62
2	(Polish Basketball Federation) Anwil Włocławek	6	4	2	553	435	+118	10	Advance to second round	83–86	—	93–63	114–71
3	(Portuguese Basketball Federation) Sporting CP	6	1	5	424	495	−71	7		69–82	83–97	—	70–78
4	(Basketball Federation of Ukraine) Dnipro	6	1	5	386	544	−158	7		55–98	63–100	57–68	—

Source: FIBA
Legend: Blue = home team win; Red = away team win.

=== Group E ===
Pos	Team	Pld	W	L	PF	PA	PD	Pts	Qualification	ORA	ARG	STA	PSD
1	(Romanian Basketball Federation) CSM CSU Oradea	6	5	1	479	433	+46	11	Advance to second round	—	78–74	77–75	85–67
2	(Romanian Basketball Federation) Argeș Pitești	6	3	3	430	422	+8	9		80–78	—	77–63	67–65
3	(Polish Basketball Federation) PGE Spójnia Stargard	6	3	3	440	424	+16	9		65–77	65–62	—	83–59
4	(Estonian Basketball Association) Pärnu Sadam	6	1	5	408	478	−70	7		72–84	73–70	72–89	—

Source: FIBA
Legend: Blue = home team win; Red = away team win.

=== Group F ===
Pos	Team	Pld	W	L	PF	PA	PD	Pts	Qualification	KAL	ESS	ALB	RIL
1	(Estonian Basketball Association) Kalev/Cramo	6	5	1	503	436	+67	11	Advance to second round	—	66–63	95–89	88–76
2	(French Federation of Basketball) ESSM Le Portel	6	4	2	479	416	+63	10	Advance to second round	54–77	—	104–73	74–60
3	(Hungarian Basketball Federation) Alba Fehérvár	6	3	3	528	564	−36	9		93–90	80–104	—	100–88
4	(Bulgarian Basketball Federation) Rilski Sportist	6	0	6	428	522	−94	6		61–87	60–80	83–93	—

Source: FIBA
Legend: Blue = home team win; Red = away team win.

=== Group G ===
Pos	Team	Pld	W	L	PF	PA	PD	Pts	Qualification	SBA	MAR	DOL	SAB
1	(Basketball Belgium) Spirou	6	5	1	499	476	+23	11	Advance to second round	—	79–69	93–86	82–81
2	(Hellenic Basketball Federation) Maroussi	6	4	2	490	444	+46	10	Advance to second round	87–70	—	99–80	82–71
3	(Swedish Basketball Federation) Norrköping Dolphins	6	2	4	474	513	−39	8		85–97	74–71	—	73–83
4	(Azerbaijan Basketball Federation) Sabah	6	1	5	443	473	−30	7		68–78	70–82	70–74	—

Source: FIBA
Legend: Blue = home team win; Red = away team win.

=== Group H ===
Pos	Team	Pld	W	L	PF	PA	PD	Pts	Qualification	LUD	JDA	GLA	TRE
1	(German Basketball Federation) MHP Riesen Ludwigsburg	6	5	1	487	404	+83	11	Advance to second round	—	80–77	86–62	87–54
2	(French Federation of Basketball) JDA Bourgogne Dijon	6	4	2	557	446	+111	10	Advance to second round	81–93	—	102–62	118–73
3	(British Basketball) Caledonia Gladiators	6	3	3	351	425	−74	9		73–71	54–90	—	20–0
4	(Basketball Federation of Kosovo) Trepça	6	0	6	344	464	−120	6		57–70	84–89	76–80	—

Source: FIBA
Legend: Blue = home team win; Red = away team win.

=== Group I ===
Pos	Team	Pld	W	L	PF	PA	PD	Pts	Qualification	FCP	PAO	HLU	SZO
1	(Portuguese Basketball Federation) Porto	6	5	1	497	429	+68	11	Advance to second round	—	99–64	80–61	77–68
2	(Hellenic Basketball Federation) PAOK mateco	6	5	1	495	450	+45	11	Advance to second round	89–70	—	94–76	82–66
3	(Basketball Belgium) Hubo Limburg United	6	2	4	460	500	−40	8		76–83	70–74	—	77–74
4	(Hungarian Basketball Federation) NHSZ Szolnoki Olajbányász	6	0	6	443	516	−73	6		71–88	69–92	95–100	—

Source: FIBA
Legend: Blue = home team win; Red = away team win.

=== Group J ===
Pos	Team	Pld	W	L	PF	PA	PD	Pts	Qualification	BIL	BCP	KUT	BAL
1	(Spanish Basketball Federation) Surne Bilbao Basket	6	6	0	538	364	+174	12	Advance to second round	—	87–66	91–63	95–55
2	(Slovak Basketball Association) Prievidza	6	4	2	484	473	+11	10		61–84	—	77–69	83–59
3	(Georgian Basketball Federation) Kutaisi 2010	6	2	4	472	534	−62	8		57–88	104–108	—	93–92
4	(Bulgarian Basketball Federation) Balkan	6	0	6	416	539	−123	6		62–93	70–89	78–86	—

Source: FIBA
Legend: Blue = home team win; Red = away team win.

=== Ranking of second-placed teams ===
Pos	Grp	Team	Pld	W	L	PF	PA	PD	Pts	Qualification
1	I	(Hellenic Basketball Federation) PAOK mateco	6	5	1	495	450	+45	11	Advance to second round
2	D	(Polish Basketball Federation) Anwil Włocławek	6	4	2	553	435	+118	10	Advance to second round
3	H	(French Federation of Basketball) JDA Bourgogne Dijon	6	4	2	557	446	+111	10	Advance to second round
4	C	(Swiss Basketball) Fribourg Olympic	6	4	2	554	479	+75	10	Advance to second round
5	F	(French Federation of Basketball) ESSM Le Portel	6	4	2	479	416	+63	10	Advance to second round
6	G	(Hellenic Basketball Federation) Maroussi	6	4	2	490	444	+46	10	Advance to second round
7	B	(Slovak Basketball Association) Patrioti Levice	6	4	2	514	487	+27	10	
8	J	(Slovak Basketball Association) Prievidza	6	4	2	484	473	+11	10	
9	A	(German Basketball Federation) Löwen Braunschweig	6	3	3	515	487	+28	9	
10	E	(Romanian Basketball Federation) Argeș Pitești	6	3	3	430	422	+8	9	

Source: FIBA

== Second round ==
It began on 3 December 2024 and concluded on 5 February 2025. In each group, teams played against each other home-and-away in a round-robin format. And the end of the second round, the top two teams from each regular season group advanced to the quarter-finals, while the rest of the teams were eliminated after the regular season.

=== Group K ===
Pos	Team	Pld	W	L	PF	PA	PD	Pts	Qualification	TOF	ZAR	FCP	MAR
1	(Turkish Basketball Federation) Tofaş	6	4	2	513	510	+3	10	Advance to quarter-finals	—	83–97	82–90	96–83
2	(Spanish Basketball Federation) Casademont Zaragoza	6	3	3	512	491	+21	9	Advance to quarter-finals	79–80	—	86–70	80–68
3	(Portuguese Basketball Federation) Porto	6	3	3	494	496	−2	9		87–95	86–75	—	80–76
4	(Hellenic Basketball Federation) Maroussi	6	2	4	487	509	−22	8		74–77	104–95	82–81	—

Source: FIBA
Legend: Blue = home team win; Red = away team win.

=== Group L ===
Pos	Team	Pld	W	L	PF	PA	PD	Pts	Qualification	CHO	BIL	ESS	SAS
1	(French Federation of Basketball) Cholet	6	5	1	507	457	+50	11	Advance to quarter-finals	—	82–75	85–82	82–70
2	(Spanish Basketball Federation) Surne Bilbao Basket	6	5	1	490	458	+32	11	Advance to quarter-finals	95–88	—	74–65	77–60
3	(French Federation of Basketball) ESSM Le Portel	6	1	5	434	493	−59	7		60–92	74–78	—	83–76
4	(Italian Basketball Federation) Banco di Sardegna Sassari	6	1	5	458	481	−23	7		75–78	89–91	88–70	—

Source: FIBA
Legend: Blue = home team win; Red = away team win.

=== Group M ===
Pos	Team	Pld	W	L	PF	PA	PD	Pts	Qualification	PAO	JDA	ORA	KAL
1	(Hellenic Basketball Federation) PAOK mateco	6	4	2	501	485	+16	10	Advance to quarter-finals	—	95–81	73–68	87–85
2	(French Federation of Basketball) JDA Bourgogne Dijon	6	4	2	514	535	−21	10	Advance to quarter-finals	97–93	—	87–86	96–93
3	(Romanian Basketball Federation) CSM CSU Oradea	6	3	3	505	460	+45	9		83–74	98–77	—	76–83
4	(Estonian Basketball Association) Kalev/Cramo	6	1	5	468	508	−40	7		71–79	70–76	66–94	—

Source: FIBA
Legend: Blue = home team win; Red = away team win.

=== Group N ===
Pos	Team	Pld	W	L	PF	PA	PD	Pts	Qualification	LUD	FRI	SBA	ANW
1	(German Basketball Federation) MHP Riesen Ludwigsburg	6	6	0	511	420	+91	12	Advance to quarter-finals	—	82–58	95–67	86–81
2	(Swiss Basketball) Fribourg Olympic	6	3	3	497	488	+9	9	Advance to quarter-finals	73–78	—	95–87	107–101
3	(Basketball Belgium) Spirou	6	2	4	451	525	−74	8		57–78	62–92	—	87–83
4	(Polish Basketball Federation) Anwil Włocławek	6	1	5	509	535	−26	7		84–92	78–72	82–91	—

Source: FIBA
Legend: Blue = home team win; Red = away team win.

== Play-offs ==
The play-offs began on 5 March and concluded on 23 April 2025 with the finals. In the play-offs, teams played against each other over two legs on a home-and-away basis.

Quarter-finals
(French Federation of Basketball) Cholet	83	90	173
(Spanish Basketball Federation) Casademont Zaragoza	83	71	154
(Hellenic Basketball Federation) PAOK mateco	62	82	144
(Swiss Basketball) Fribourg Olympic	62	76	138
(Turkish Basketball Federation) Tofaş	72	102	174
(Spanish Basketball Federation) Surne Bilbao Basket	84	93	177
(German Basketball Federation) MHP Riesen Ludwigsburg	75	72	147
(French Federation of Basketball) JDA Bourgogne Dijon	88	83	171

Semi-finals
(French Federation of Basketball) Cholet	89	88	177
(Hellenic Basketball Federation) PAOK mateco	88	90	178
(Spanish Basketball Federation) Surne Bilbao Basket	58	97	155
(French Federation of Basketball) JDA Bourgogne Dijon	77	68	145

Finals
(Hellenic Basketball Federation) PAOK mateco	65	84	149
(Spanish Basketball Federation) Surne Bilbao Basket	72	82	154

Source: FIBA

=== Quarter-finals ===
The first legs were held on 5 March, and the second legs on 12 March 2025.

Team 1	Agg.	Team 2	1st leg	2nd leg
Tofaş (Turkish Basketball Federation)	174–177	(Spanish Basketball Federation) Surne Bilbao Basket	72–84	102–93
Cholet (French Federation of Basketball)	173–154	(Spanish Basketball Federation) Casademont Zaragoza	83–83	90–71
PAOK mateco (Hellenic Basketball Federation)	144–138	(Swiss Basketball) Fribourg Olympic	62–62	82–76
MHP Riesen Ludwigsburg (German Basketball Federation)	147–171	(French Federation of Basketball) JDA Bourgogne Dijon	75–88	72–83

=== Semi-finals ===
The first legs were held on 26 March, and the second legs on 2 April 2025.

Team 1	Agg.	Team 2	1st leg	2nd leg
Surne Bilbao Basket (Spanish Basketball Federation)	155–145	(French Federation of Basketball) JDA Bourgogne Dijon	58–77	97–68
Cholet (French Federation of Basketball)	177–178	(Hellenic Basketball Federation) PAOK mateco	89–88	88–90

=== Finals ===
The first leg was held on 16 April, and the second leg on 23 April 2025.

Team 1	Agg.	Team 2	1st leg	2nd leg
PAOK mateco (Hellenic Basketball Federation)	149–154	(Spanish Basketball Federation) Surne Bilbao Basket	65–72	84–82

== Individual awards ==
=== Final MVP ===
Player	Team	Ref.
(Sweden) Melwin Pantzar	(Spanish Basketball Federation) Surne Bilbao Basket	

=== MVP of the Month ===
Month	Player	Team	Ref.
2024
October	(France) Bastien Vautier	(French Federation of Basketball) Cholet	
November	(United States) Jeriah Horne	(Hungarian Basketball Federation) Alba Fehérvár	
December	(Mexico) Alex Pérez	(Turkish Basketball Federation) Tofaş	
2025
January	(United States) Toney Douglas	(Portuguese Basketball Federation) Porto	
March	(United States) Shavar Reynolds Jr.	(Hellenic Basketball Federation) PAOK mateco	

== See also ==
- 2024–25 EuroLeague
- 2024–25 Basketball Champions League
- 2024–25 EuroCup Basketball
