= Vietnam men's national 3x3 team =

National 3x3 basketball team

Vietnam
- FIBA zone: FIBA Asia
- National federation: Vietnam Basketball Federation

Asia Cup
- Appearances: 2

The Vietnam men's national 3x3 team is the 3x3 basketball team representing Vietnam in international men's competitions.

The team won the bronze medal in the men's 3x3 tournament at the 2019 Southeast Asian Games held in the Philippines.

== Competitions ==
=== Southeast Asian Games ===
Year	Position	Pld	W	L
(Philippines) 2019	3rd	8	6	2
(Vietnam) 2022	2nd	9	7	2
(Cambodia) 2023	4th	5	2	3
(Thailand) 2025				
Total		22	15	7

=== 3x3 Asia Cup ===
- 2018 – 21st
- 2025 – 9th
