= Yvan Delsarte =

Belgian basketball player (1929–2019)

Personal information
- Nationality: Belgian
- Born: 31 May 1929 Montignies-sur-Sambre, Belgium
- Died: 11 June 2019 (aged 90)

Sport
- Sport: Basketball

Yvan Delsarte (31 May 1929 – 11 June 2019) was a Belgian basketball player. He competed in the men's tournament at the 1952 Summer Olympics.
