= 3x3 basketball at the 2025 SEA Games =

3×3 Basketball at the 2025 SEA Games
- Venue: Nimibutr Stadium
- Dates: 10–11 December 2025

3x3 basketball was among the sports contested at the 2025 SEA Games at the Nimibutr Stadium in Bangkok, Thailand.

== Participating nations ==
Nation	Men	Women
Indonesia	Yes	Yes
Laos	Yes	Yes
Malaysia	Yes	Yes
Myanmar	Yes	No
Philippines	Yes	Yes
Singapore	Yes	Yes
Thailand	Yes	Yes
Vietnam	Yes	Yes
Total: 8 NOCs	8	7

== Medal table ==
* Host nation (Thailand)

Rank	Nation	Gold	Silver	Bronze	Total
1	Thailand*	1	1	0	2
2	Indonesia	1	0	0	1
3	Singapore	0	1	0	1
4	Malaysia	0	0	2	2
Totals (4 entries)		2	2	2	6

== Medalists ==
Event	Gold	Silver	Bronze
Men's tournament	Thailand; Freddie Lish; Noppachai Thongpool; Panthawat Techasamran; Chanatip Jakrawan	Singapore; Ching Zhen Yu; Xu Duanyang; Nur Aufa; Liam Richard Arman	Malaysia; Anthony Liew Wen Qian; Ting Chun Hong; Ooi Xian Fu; Chang Zi Fueng
Women's tournament	Indonesia; Agustin Elya Gradita Retong; Dewa Ayu Made Sriartha; Evelyn Fiyo; Kimberley Pierre-Louis	Thailand; Sroifa Phetnin; Sasiporn Wongtapha; Supavadee Kunchuan; Rattiyakorn Udomsuk	Malaysia; Foo Suet Ying; Tan Sin Jie; Tan Pei Jie; Tan Yin Jie
