= 2018–19 Canberra Capitals season =

- Head Coach: Paul Goriss
- Captain: Kelsey Griffin and Marianna Tolo
- Venue: National Convention Centre and AIS Arena

Results
- Record: 16–5
- Ladder: 1st
- Finals: WNBL Champions (defeated Adelaide, 2–1)

Leaders
- Points: Griffin (19.6)
- Rebounds: Griffin (12.2)
- Assists: Wilson (6.1)

The 2018–19 Canberra Capitals season was the 35th season for the franchise in the Women's National Basketball League (WNBL). It saw the team's eighth premiership win.

== Roster ==
2018–19 Canberra Capitals roster
Players
Coaches

Pos.	No.	Nat.	Name	Ht.
F	2	(Australia)	Young, Hannah	1.85 m (6 ft 1 in)
G	5	(Australia)	Mitchell, Leilani	1.65 m (5 ft 5 in)
C	7	(Australia)	Scherf, Lauren	1.96 m (6 ft 5 in)
G	8	(Australia)	Cubillo, Abby	1.61 m (5 ft 3 in)
G	9	(Australia)	Rocci, Maddison	1.68 m (5 ft 6 in)
G	11	(Canada)	Nurse, Kia	1.83 m (6 ft 0 in)
C	12	(Australia)	Tolo, Marianna (C)	1.96 m (6 ft 5 in)
F	21	(Australia)	Froling, Keely	1.88 m (6 ft 2 in)
G	22	(Australia)	Wilson, Kelly	1.70 m (5 ft 7 in)
F	23	(Australia)	Griffin, Kelsey (C)	1.88 m (6 ft 2 in)
G	25	(Australia)	Loader, Eliza-Jane	1.73 m (5 ft 8 in)
F	41	(United States)	McLaren, Kaili	1.88 m (6 ft 2 in)

Head coach

- (Australia) Paul Goriss

Assistant coach(es)

- (Australia) Phil Brown
- (Australia) Carly Wilson
- (Australia) Bec Goddard

Legend

- (C) Team captain
- (DP) Development player
- (I) Import player
- Injured

- Roster
Updated: 9 February 2019

== Standings ==
#	WNBL Championship ladder				
#	Team	W	L	PCT	GP
1	Canberra Capitals	16	5	76.1	21
2	Melbourne Boomers	15	6	71.4	21
3	Adelaide Lightning	13	8	61.9	21
4	Perth Lynx	13	8	61.9	21
5	Dandenong Rangers	9	12	42.8	21
6	Townsville Fire	9	12	42.8	21
7	Bendigo Spirit	7	14	33.3	21
8	Sydney Uni Flames	2	19	9.5	21

== Results ==
=== Regular season ===
Round	Date	Team	Score	High points	High rebounds	High assists	Location	Record	Report
1	12 October 2018	@ Sydney Uni Flames	97-78	Kia Nurse (26)	Kelly Wilson (8)	Kelly Wilson (11)	Brydens Stadium	1–0	
2	19 October 2018	@ Melbourne Boomers	72-65	Kelsey Griffin (23)	Kelsey Griffin (14)	Kelly Wilson (8)	Geelong Arena	2–0	
2	21 October 2018	Adelaide Lightning	79-75	Kelsey Griffin (23)	Lauren Scherf (10)	Leilani Mitchell (4)	National Convention Centre	3–0	
3	26 October 2018	Melbourne Boomers	78–84	Kia Nurse (26)	Kelsey Griffin (11)	Kelly Wilson (8)	AIS Arena	3–1	
4	4 November 2018	Sydney Uni Flames	84–79	Kelly Wilson (17)	Kelsey Griffin (13)	Lauren Scherf (4)	National Convention Centre	4–1	
5	10 November 2018	@ Perth Lynx	65–71	Kelsey Griffin (30)	Kelsey Griffin (18)	Kelly Wilson (4)	Bendat Basketball Centre	4–2	
6	18 November 2018	Dandenong Rangers	77–65	Kelsey Griffin (30)	Lauren Scherf (8)	Kelly Wilson (7)	National Convention Centre	5–2	
7	23 November 2018	Melbourne Boomers	72–70	Kelsey Griffin (16)	Kelsey Griffin (18)	Kelly Wilson (4)	National Convention Centre	6–2	
8	20 November 2018	Perth Lynx	84–88	Kia Nurse (17)	Kelsey Griffin (14)	Kelly Wilson (8)	National Convention Centre	6–3	
8	2 December 2018	@ Adelaide Lightning	83–91	Kelsey Griffin (23)	Kelsey Griffin (12)	Kelly Wilson (11)	Titanium Security Arena	6–4	
9	9 December 2018	Bendigo Spirit	94–63	Marianna Tolo (23)	Kelsey Griffin (7)	Kelly Wilson (7)	National Convention Centre	7–4	
10	14 December 2018	@ Adelaide Lightning	73–93	Kelsey Griffin (18)	Marianna Tolo (8)	Leilani Mitchell (4)	Titanium Security Arena	7–5	
10	26 December 2018	Perth Lynx	92–60	Kelsey Griffin (27)	Kelsey Griffin (15)	Leilani Mitchell (7)	National Convention Centre	8–5	
11	21 December 2018	Dandenong Rangers	87–60	Kelsey Griffin (24)	Kelsey Griffin (14)	Leilani Mitchell (6)	National Convention Centre	9–5	
11	23 December 2018	@ Townsville Fire	81–55	Kelsey Griffin (21)	Marianna Tolo (11)	Kelly Wilson (7)	Townsville Stadium	10–5	
12	28 December 2018	Townsville Fire	104–75	Kia Nurse (33)	Kelsey Griffin (12)	Leilani Mitchell (8)	National Convention Centre	11–5	
12	30 December 2018	@ Dandenong Rangers	86–43	Kia Nurse (26)	Lauren Scherf (11)	Leilani Mitchell (5)	Dandenong Stadium	12–5	
13	4 January 2019	Bendigo Spirit	102–62	Kelsey Griffin (27)	Lauren Scherf (10)	Leilani Mitchell (7)	AIS Arena	13–5	
14	11 January 2019	@ Townsville Fire	80–68	Leilani Mitchell (20)	Lauren Scherf (10)	Leilani Mitchell (7)	Townsville Stadium	14–5	
14	13 January 2019	@ Sydney Uni Flames	99–79	Leilani Mitchell (24)	Kelsey Griffin (11)	Leilani Mitchell (8)	Qudos Bank Arena	15–5	
15	19 January 2019	@ Bendigo Spirit	97–101	Marianna Tolo (27)	Kelsey Griffin (20)	Leilani Mitchell (9)	Bendigo Stadium	16–5	

=== Semi-finals ===
Round	Date	Team	Score	High points	High rebounds	High assists	Location	Record	Report
1	25 January 2019	Perth Lynx	95–76	Kia Nurse (31)	Kelsey Griffin (12)	Leilani Mitchell (7)	AIS Arena	1–0	
2	25 January 2019	@ Perth Lynx	91–75	Kia Nurse (27)	Kelsey Griffin (13)	Kelly Wilson (12)	Bendat Basketball Centre	2–0	

=== Grand Finals ===
Round	Date	Team	Score	High points	High rebounds	High assists	Location	Record	Report
1	9 February 2019	Adelaide Lightning	88-76	Kia Nurse (23)	Kelsey Griffin (12)	Leilani Mitchell (8)	AIS Arena	1–0	
2	13 February 2019	@ Adelaide Lightning	73–74	Kelsey Griffin (24)	Kelsey Griffin (23)	Leilani Mitchell (9)	Titanium Security Arena	1–1	
3	16 February 2019	Adelaide Lightning	93–73	Kelsey Griffin (29)	Kelsey Griffin (15)	Leilani Mitchell (6)	AIS Arena	2–1	

== Team Stats ==
Player	APG	BLK	FGA	FGM	FG%	FTA	FTMPG	FT%	PTS	PPG	DEF	OFF	REB	RPG	STL	3PA	3PM	3P%	TO
Marianna Tolo	2.06	23	156	89	56	40	1.69	68	206	12.88	55	32	87	5.44	9	2	1	50	22
Leilani Mitchell	5.46	3	249	102	41	35	1.42	97	298	12.42	57	23	80	3.33	41	144	60	42	44
Lauren Scherf	1.23	21	196	86	44	29	0.81	72	194	7.46	92	57	149	5.73	13	15	1	7	32
Kelsey Griffin	2.77	25	403	204	51	108	3.04	73	511	19.65	213	106	319	12.27	44	74	24	32	38
Keely Froling	0.54	9	100	45	45	40	1.04	68	123	4.73	46	29	75	2.88	5	18	6	33	16
Isabelle Bourne	0	0	1	0	0	0	0	0	0	0	0	0	0	0	0	1	0	0	0
Maddison Rocci	1.96	2	129	45	35	41	1.31	83	139	5.35	32	14	46	1.77	21	46	15	33	34
Kristy Wallace	1	0	3	1	33	2	0.5	50	4	2	1	1	2	1	2	1	1	100	1
Hannah Young	0	0	6	1	17	0	0	0	2	0.17	4	2	6	0.5	1	2	0	0	1
Kelly Wilson	6.19	9	201	80	40	31	1.04	87	208	8	87	31	118	4.54	37	67	21	31	62
Elizajane Loader	0	0	5	0	0	0	0	0	0	0	0	1	1	0.13	1	4	0	0	2
Abby Cubillo	0.14	0	3	0	0	2	0.14	50	1	0.14	1	1	2	0.29	0	2	0	0	2
Kaili McLaren	0.55	8	57	26	46	12	0.45	83	66	3	25	8	33	1.5	7	11	4	36	9
Kia Nurse	2.12	7	391	155	40	118	3.38	75	478	18.38	107	21	128	4.92	39	201	80	40	48

== Signings ==
=== Returning ===
Player	Signed	Contract	Reference
Keely Froling	29 March 2018	2-year contract	
Lauren Scherf	4 May 2017	2-year contract	
Maddison Rocci	17 April 2018	1-year contract	

=== Incoming ===
Player	Signed	Contract	Reference
Kelsey Griffin	8 March 2018	1-year contract	
Leilani Mitchell	22 March 2018	1-year contract	
Marianna Tolo	19 April 2018	1-year contract	
Kristy Wallace	3 May 2018	2-year contract	
Kelly Wilson	22 June 2018	1-year contract	
Hannah Young	25 July 2018	1-year contract	
Kia Nurse	9 August 2018	1-year contract	
Kaili McLaren	21 August 2018	1-year contract	

== Awards ==
=== Post-season ===
Award	Recipient	Reference
WNBL Most Valuable Player Award	Kelsey Griffin	
WNBL Grand Final Most Valuable Player Award	Kelsey Griffin	
