= Freddie Lish =

American, Israeli, and Thai basketball player

No. 3 – South Gobi Broncos
- Position: Point guard
- League: The League

Personal information
- Born: August 18, 1988 (age 38) Honolulu, Hawaii, U.S.
- Listed height: 5 ft 9 in (1.75 m)

Career information
- High school: Casimir Pulaski (Milwaukee, Wisconsin)
- College: South Alabama (2011–2013)
- NBA draft: 2013: undrafted
- Playing career: 2013–present

Career history
- 2013–2016: Thailand Slammers / Hi-Tech
- 2016–2017: Westports Malaysia Dragons
- 2017: Nakhon Pathom Mad Goat
- 2017–2018: CLS Knights Indonesia
- 2018: PEA
- 2018: KB Rahoveci
- 2018–2020: Mono Vampire
- 2020: Khon Kaen Raptors
- 2020: Hi-Tech
- 2020–2021: Elitzur Eito Ashkelon
- 2021–2022: A.S.A. Ashkelon
- 2022: Shoot it Dragons
- 2022–2023: Zavkhan Brothers
- 2023–2024: Selenge Bodons
- 2024: Hi-Tech
- 2024: Thai General Equipment
- 2024–2025: Penang Sunrise Youngsters
- 2025: Hi-Tech
- 2026: Xac Broncos
- 2026: Hi-Tech
- 2026: Thai General Equipment
- 2026–present: South Gobi Broncos
Medals
Men's basketball
Representing Thailand
Southeast Asian Games
Silver medal – second place	2025 Thailand	Team
Bronze medal – third place	2021 Vietnam	Team
Bronze medal – third place	2023 Cambodia	Team
Men's 3x3 basketball
Representing Thailand
Southeast Asian Games
Gold medal – first place	2021 Vietnam	Team
Gold medal – first place	2025 Thailand	Team
Bronze medal – third place	2023 Cambodia	Team
Asian Beach Games
Silver medal – second place	2026 Sanya	Team

Frederick Lee Jones Lish (born Frederick Lee Jones-Goldstein Jr., August 18, 1988) is an American, Israeli and Thai professional basketball player for the South Gobi Broncos of the Mongolian The League. He played college basketball for the South Alabama Jaguars, when he was known as Freddie Goldstein. Born in the United States, Lish also holds Israeli and Thai citizenship. He has played for the Thai national team.

== Early life ==
Frederick Lee Jones-Goldstein Jr. was born in Honolulu, Hawaii. His parents both attended Hawaii Pacific University and were intercollegiate athletes for the school's Sea Warriors (now Sharks) teams. His father was a National Association of Intercollegiate Athletics (NAIA) All-American basketball player. Goldstein's mother was born in Thailand. His father was an Israeli Jew.

Goldstein grew up in Milwaukee, Wisconsin, where he attended Casimir Pulaski High School. Following high school, he moved to St. Augustine, Florida. After three years out of school, he realized that he "had to do something productive with my life".

== College career ==
Goldstein enrolled at Motlow State Community College (MSCC), where he played basketball for two seasons. He averaged 16.3 points per game and made 43 percent of his 3-point field goals, and twice earned honorable mention as a National Junior College Athletic Association (NJCAA) All-America selection. He was the first player in Motlow school history to earn All-American honors in both of their seasons. His 136 career 3-pointers made ranked second in MSCC history.

Goldstein transferred to the University of South Alabama, and averaged 11.7 points and 2.7 rebounds a game, shooting 36.7 percent overall and 37.1 percent on 3-pointers for the Jaguars in 2011–12. On January 14, 2012, against Troy, he scored a then-career high 30 points and made a school-record nine 3-pointers in a 75–60 win. On February 11, he scored a career-high 33 points and tied his school record with nine 3-pointers in an 88–86 win over Louisiana–Monroe. He made the game-winner, a two-foot (0.61 m) layup for his only two-point basket, with 32 seconds left in the game. As a senior in 2012–13, Goldstein broke his right clavicle while shooting against Western Kentucky, and was initially thought to be out for the season. However, South Alabama was invited to the 2013 CollegeInsider.com Postseason Tournament, when Goldstein was cleared to return.

== Professional career ==
At the end of his senior year at South Alabama, Goldstein chose to play professionally over finishing school. He has played in Asia in Thailand, Malaysia, Indonesia, and Mongolia. He has also played in Israel, where he is a naturalized citizen.

== National team career ==
By 2022, Goldstein had become known as Freddie Lish. He joined the Thai national team for the 2021 Southeast Asian Games, where he also won a gold medal with their 3x3 team. Lish referred to playing for the country as "my dream ever since I found out my mom was born in Thailand". He also played for Thailand at the 2025 FIBA Asia Cup qualification. He won another gold medal in 3x3 basketball at the 2025 SEA Games.
