= Basketball at the 2019 SEA Games – Men's 3x3 tournament =

Men's 3x3 basketball tournament at the 2019 SEA Games
- Venue: Filoil Flying V Centre, San Juan, Metro Manila
- Dates: 1–2 December
- Nations: 7

Medalists
gold medal	Philippines (PHI)
silver medal	Indonesia (INA)
bronze medal	Vietnam (VIE)

The men's 3x3 basketball tournament at the 2019 SEA Games was held at the Filoil Flying V Centre, San Juan, Metro Manila from 1 to 2 December. This was the first time 3x3 contest in the games. A tournament for women was also organized.

== Venue ==
The 3x3 basketball tournament was played at the Filoil Flying V Centre in San Juan, Metro Manila.

The SM Mall of Asia Activity Center in Pasay was considered to host the 3x3 basketball competitions.

San Juan	Basketball at the 2019 SEA Games – Men's 3x3 tournament (Philippines)
Filoil Flying V Centre	Basketball at the 2019 SEA Games – Men's 3x3 tournament (Philippines)
Capacity: 5,500	Basketball at the 2019 SEA Games – Men's 3x3 tournament (Philippines)

== Results ==
=== Preliminary round ===
Pos	Team	Pld	W	L	PF	PA	PD	Pts	Qualification
1	Philippines (H)	6	6	0	126	71	+55	12	Advanced to Semifinals
2	Vietnam	6	5	1	118	90	+28	11	Advanced to Semifinals
3	Indonesia	6	4	2	112	85	+27	10	Advanced to Semifinals
4	Thailand	6	3	3	102	101	+1	9	Advanced to Semifinals
5	Malaysia	6	2	4	107	104	+3	8	
6	Myanmar	6	1	5	71	117	−46	7	
7	Cambodia	6	0	6	55	123	−68	6	

Source: 2019 SEA Games
Rules for classification: 1) Points; 2) Head-to-head results; 3) Points for;
(H) Hosts

1 December 2019
9:00

Report

Indonesia	17–7	Cambodia

Filoil Flying V Centre

1 December 2019
9:20

Report

Myanmar	11–21	Malaysia

Filoil Flying V Centre

1 December 2019
10:20

Report

Vietnam	20–18	Thailand

Filoil Flying V Centre

1 December 2019
11:00

Report

Malaysia	18–20	Vietnam

Filoil Flying V Centre

1 December 2019
11:40

Report

Cambodia	10–21	Myanmar

Filoil Flying V Centre

1 December 2019
12:00

Report

Philippines	21–17	Indonesia

Filoil Flying V Centre

1 December 2019
13:00

Report

Myanmar	10–21	Philippines

Filoil Flying V Centre

1 December 2019
13:20

Report

Vietnam	22–10	Cambodia

Filoil Flying V Centre

1 December 2019
13:40

Report

Thailand	20–17	Malaysia

Filoil Flying V Centre

1 December 2019
14:40

Report

Cambodia	9–21	Thailand

Filoil Flying V Centre

1 December 2019
15:00

Report

Philippines	21–15	Vietnam

Filoil Flying V Centre

1 December 2019
15:40

Report

Indonesia	21–10	Myanmar

Filoil Flying V Centre

1 December 2019
16:00

Report

Thailand	10–21	Philippines

Filoil Flying V Centre

2 December 2019
9:40

Report

Vietnam	19–17	Indonesia

Filoil Flying V Centre

2 December 2019
10:00

Report

Malaysia	21–13	Cambodia

Filoil Flying V Centre

2 December 2019
11:00

Report

Indonesia	21–11	Thailand

Filoil Flying V Centre

2 December 2019
11:20

Report

Philippines	21–13	Malaysia

Filoil Flying V Centre

2 December 2019
12:00

Report

Myanmar	6–22	Vietnam

Filoil Flying V Centre

2 December 2019
12:20

Report

Cambodia	6–21	Philippines

Filoil Flying V Centre

2 December 2019
13:00

Report

Thailand	22–13	Myanmar

Filoil Flying V Centre

2 December 2019
13:20

Report

Malaysia	17–19	Indonesia

Filoil Flying V Centre

=== Final round ===
==== Semifinals ====
2 December 2019
14:20

Report

Philippines	21–11	Thailand

Filoil Flying V Centre

2 December 2019
14:40

Report

Vietnam	18–20	Indonesia

Filoil Flying V Centre

==== Bronze medal game ====
2 December 2019
15:20

Report

Thailand	17–21	Vietnam

Filoil Flying V Centre

==== Final ====
2 December 2019
16:00

Report

Philippines	21–9	Indonesia

Filoil Flying V Centre

== See also ==
- Women's 3x3 tournament
