= Starlites BC =

Starlites
- Arena: Ta Qali Sports Pavilion
- Location: Naxxar, Malta
- President: Dr. Ivan Riolo

Starlites Basketball Club, sometimes known as Starlites Naxxar, is a Maltese professional basketball club based in Naxxar. They made debut in European competition in the 2024–25 season of the FIBA Europe Cup, the fourth level continental league. They Starlites plays its home games at the Ta Qali Sports Pavilion.

The club was founded by Ms. Marie Therese Zammit under the name Silema Wives as a women's social club, but later expanded to sports and started to include men as well. Starlites men's basketball team started playing in 2011.
