= Basketball at the 2023 SEA Games =

2023 SEA Games Basketball Tournament
- 2023

Tournament details
- Games: 2023 SEA Games
- Host nation: Cambodia
- Venue: Morodok Techo Indoor Sports Center
- Duration: 6–16 May 2023

Men's tournament
- Teams: 8

Women's tournament
- Teams: 7

Tournaments
← 2021	2025 →

Basketball was among the sports contested at the 2023 SEA Games in Cambodia.

The tournaments did not follow FIBA eligibility rules; players only had to have citizenship of the country they sought to represent their national team in the games. This meant that every national team could field as many naturalized players or dual citizens as they wanted regardless of whether or not they had acquired their passport by the age of 16 as per FIBA rules.

== Participating nations ==
Nation	Men	Women
Cambodia	Yes	Yes
Indonesia	Yes	Yes
Laos	Yes	No
Malaysia	Yes	Yes
Philippines	Yes	Yes
Singapore	Yes	Yes
Thailand	Yes	Yes
Vietnam	Yes	Yes
Total: 8 NOCs	8	7

== Medalists ==
Event	Gold	Silver	Bronze
Men's 5-on-5 tournament	Philippines; Mason Amos; Justin Brownlee; Marcio Lassiter; Jerom Lastimosa; Chris Newsome; Calvin Oftana; CJ Perez; Mike Phillips; Chris Ross; Brandon Ganuelas-Rosser; Christian Standhardinger; Arvin Tolentino	Cambodia; Somoeur Chanyvathana; Chin Sophana; Anthony Dominic Dar; Darrin Dorsey; Darius Henderson; Joseph Hoeup; Oscar Lopes; Dwayne Morgan; Pek Mith; Brandon Peterson; Sayeed Pridgett; Toun Sopheen	Thailand; Antonio Price Soonthornchote; Frederick Lee Jones Lish; Moses Morgan; Chanatip Jakrawan; Nattakarn Muangboon; Nakorn Jaisanuk; Arnat Phuangla; Anasawee Klaewnarong; Manatsawee Booddoung; Tyler Lamb; Martin Breunig; Jakongmee Morgan
Women's 5-on-5 tournament	Indonesia; Adelaide Callista Wongsohardjo; Agustin Elya Gradita Retong; Clarita Antonio; Dewa Ayu Made Sriartha Kusuma; Dyah Lestari; Henny Sutjiono; Kadek Pratita Citta Dewi; Kimberley Pierre-Louis; Nathania Claresta Orville; Peyton Whitted; Priscilla Annabel Karen; Yuni Anggraeni	Philippines; France Cabinbin; Janine Pontejos; Jack Animam; Clare Saquing Castro; Camille Clarin; Ana Katrina Castillo; Afril Bernardino; Ella Fajardo; Angelica Marie Surada; Stefanie Ann Berberabe; Katrina Guytingco; Marizze Andrea Tongco	Malaysia; Saw Wei Yin; Kalaimathi Rajintiran; Pang Hui Pin; Chong Yin Yin; Yap Fook Yee; Tan Sin Jie; Chia Mun Yi; Lee Phei Ling; Ooi Poh Yee; Magdelene Low; Nur Izzati Yaakob; Foo Suet Ying
