= Basketball at the 2019 SEA Games – Women's 3x3 tournament =

Women's 3x3 basketball tournament at the 2019 SEA Games
- Venue: Filoil Flying V Centre, San Juan, Metro Manila
- Dates: 1–2 December
- Nations: 6

Medalists
gold medal	Philippines (PHI)
silver medal	Thailand (THA)
bronze medal	Malaysia (MAS)

The women's 3x3 basketball tournament at the 2019 SEA Games was held at the Filoil Flying V Centre, San Juan, Metro Manila from 1 to 2 December 2019. This was the first time 3x3 contest in the games. A tournament for men was also organized.

== Results ==
=== Preliminary round ===
Pos	Team	Pld	W	L	PF	PA	PD	Pts	Qualification
1	Philippines (H)	5	4	1	93	66	+27	9	Advanced to Semifinals
2	Thailand	5	4	1	88	63	+25	9	Advanced to Semifinals
3	Malaysia	5	4	1	84	59	+25	9	Advanced to Semifinals
4	Vietnam	5	2	3	72	80	−8	7	Advanced to Semifinals
5	Indonesia	5	1	4	67	74	−7	6	
6	Myanmar	5	0	5	41	103	−62	5	

Source: 2019 SEA Games
Rules for classification: 1) Points; 2) Head-to-head results; 3) Points for
(H) Hosts

1 December
9:40

Report

Malaysia	15–10	Vietnam

Filoil Flying V Centre

1 December
10:00

Report

Indonesia	11–13	Thailand

Filoil Flying V Centre

1 December
10:40

Report

Philippines	21–4	Myanmar

Filoil Flying V Centre

1 December
11:20

Report

Myanmar	5–17	Thailand

Filoil Flying V Centre

1 December
12:20

Report

Vietnam	21–12	Indonesia

Filoil Flying V Centre

1 December
12:40

Report

Philippines	15–13	Malaysia

Filoil Flying V Centre

1 December
14:40

Report

Malaysia	22–6	Myanmar

Filoil Flying V Centre

1 December
15:00

Report

Indonesia	13–16	Philippines

Filoil Flying V Centre

1 December
16:00

Report

Thailand	17–6	Vietnam

Filoil Flying V Centre

2 December
9:00

Report

Thailand	19–21	Malaysia

Filoil Flying V Centre

2 December
9:20

Report

Vietnam	14–21	Philippines

Filoil Flying V Centre

2 December
10:20

Report

Myanmar	15–21	Vietnam

Filoil Flying V Centre

2 December
10:40

Report

Philippines	20–22	Thailand

Filoil Flying V Centre

2 December
11:40

Report

Malaysia	13–9	Indonesia

Filoil Flying V Centre

2 December
12:40

Report

Indonesia	22–11	Myanmar

Filoil Flying V Centre

=== Final round ===
==== Semifinals ====
2 December
13:40

Report

Philippines	21–12	Vietnam

Filoil Flying V Centre

2 December
14:00

Report

Thailand	16–14	Malaysia

Filoil Flying V Centre

==== Bronze medal game ====
2 December
15:00

Report

Malaysia	21–7	Vietnam

Filoil Flying V Centre

==== Final ====
2 December
15:40

Report

Philippines	17–13	Thailand

Filoil Flying V Centre

== See also ==
- Men's 3x3 tournament
