= Nimibutr Stadium =

Sports venue in Bangkok, Thailand

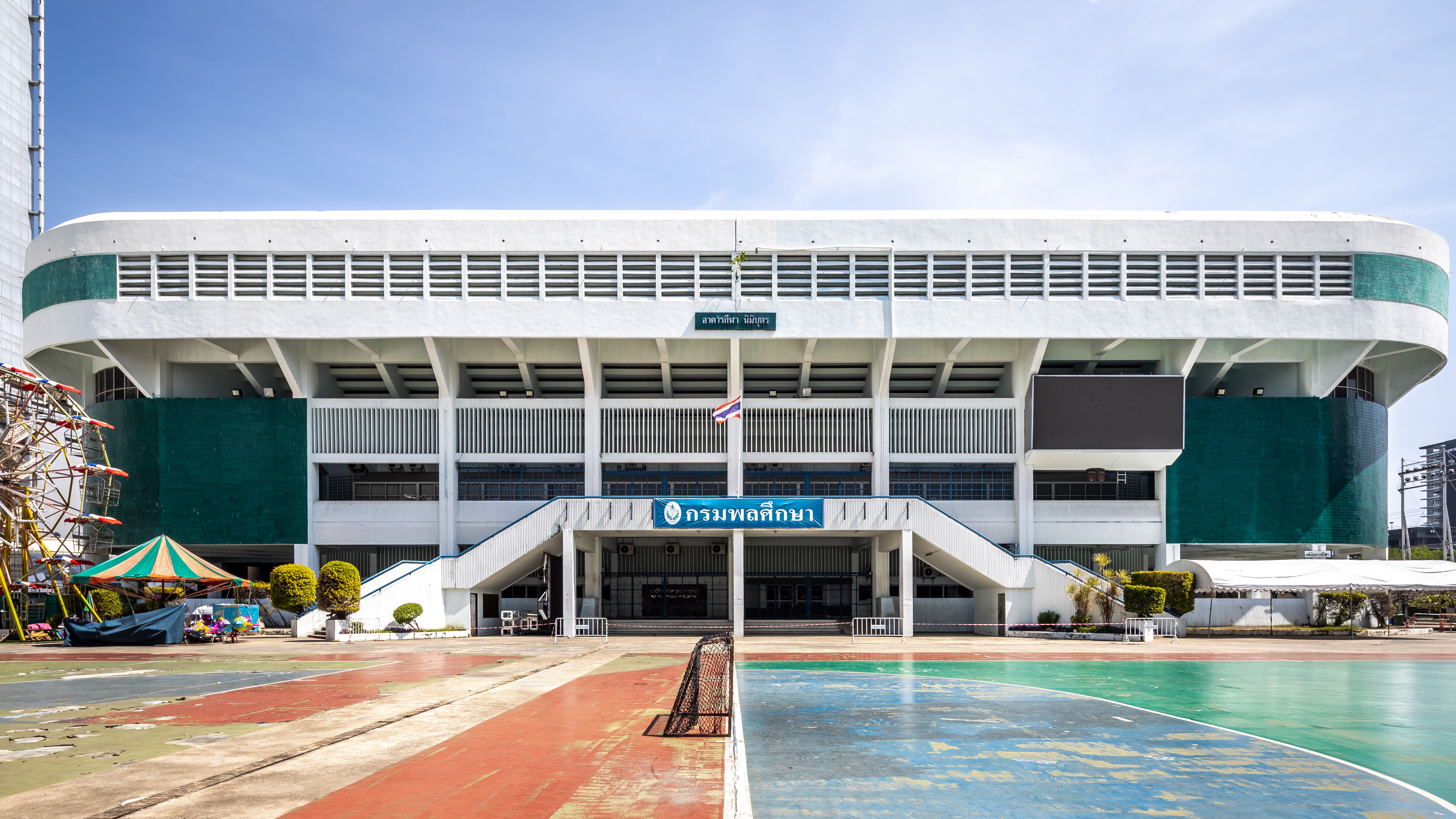
- Interactive map of Nimibutr Stadium
- Location: Bangkok, Thailand
- Coordinates: 13.745284°N 100.528863°E
- Owner: Sports Authority of Thailand (SAT)
- Operator: Sports Authority of Thailand (SAT)
- Capacity: 5,600
- Public transit: BTS National Stadium

Construction
- Opened: 1963

Tenants
- 1966 Asian Games; 1970 Asian Games; 1978 Asian Games; 1998 Asian Games; 2000 AFC Futsal Championship; 2007 Summer Universiade; 2008 AFC Futsal Championship; 2008 AFF Futsal Championship; 2012 FIFA Futsal World Cup; Bangkok Tigers

Nimibutr Stadium (sometimes referred to as Nimibutr Gymnasium) is an indoor sports arena located in Bangkok, Thailand. The capacity of the arena is 5,600 spectators. It was built in 1963 and is part of the National Stadium complex.

It is used for a variety of indoor sports including badminton, handball, basketball, futsal, gymnastics and boxing. It has also hosted concerts.

== Past sports events hosted at the stadium ==
=== Badminton ===
- 2012 Thailand Open Grand Prix Gold
- 2013 Thailand Open Grand Prix Gold
- 2016 Thailand Masters Grand Prix Gold
- 2016 Thailand Open Grand Prix Gold
- 2017 Thailand Masters Grand Prix Gold
- 2017 Thailand Open Grand Prix Gold
- 2018 Thailand Masters
- 2018 Thailand Open
- 2022 BWF World Tour Finals
- 2023 Thailand Masters
- 2024 Thailand Open

=== Basketball ===
- Basketball at the 1966 Asian Games
- Basketball at the 1970 Asian Games
- Basketball at the 1978 Asian Games
- 2007 Summer Universiade

=== Boxing ===
- 2003 World Amateur Boxing Championships

=== Cycling ===
- Indoor cycling at the 2005 Asian Indoor Games

=== Futsal ===
- 2000 AFC Futsal Championship
- 2008 AFC Futsal Championship
- 2008 AFF Futsal Championship
- 2012 FIFA Futsal World Cup

=== Gymnastics ===
- 2017 Asian Artistic Gymnastics Championships

=== Handball ===
- 2002 Asian Men's Junior Handball Championship
- 2005 Asian Women's Youth Handball Championship
- 2005 Asian Men's Youth Handball Championship
- 2006 Asian Men's Handball Championship
- 2008 Asian Women's Handball Championship

=== Muay Thai ===
- Muay Thai at the 2009 Asian Martial Arts Games

== Transportation ==
Nimibutr Stadium is accessible from National Stadium BTS Station of the BTS Skytrain.
