= Basketball at the 2021 SEA Games =

23rd SEA Games Basketball Tournament
- Vietnam 2021

Tournament details
- Games: 2021 SEA Games
- Host nation: Vietnam
- Venue: Thanh Trì District Sporting Hall
- Duration: 13–22 May 2022

Men's tournament
- Teams: 7 (5x5), 7 (3x3)

Women's tournament
- Teams: 6 (5x5), 7 (3x3)

Tournaments
← 2019	2023 →

Basketball was among the sports contested at the 2021 SEA Games in Vietnam. The basketball tournament in the games featured four events: traditional 5x5 basketball and 3x3 basketball, for both men and women. The competition was held at Thanh Trì District Sporting Hall in Hanoi, Vietnam.

== Competition schedule ==
3x3 basketball was held from 13 to 14 May 2022 while the regular 5x5 basketball event will be held from 16 to 22 May 2022.

== Participating nations ==
- Cambodia
- Indonesia
- Malaysia
- Philippines
- Singapore
- Thailand
- Vietnam

== Medalists ==
Event	Gold	Silver	Bronze
Men's 5x5 tournament	Indonesia; Andakara Prastawa; Hardianus Lakudu; Yudha Saputera; Abraham Damar Grahita; Agassi Goantara; Arki Dikania Wisnu; Brandon Jawato; Juan Laurent; Dame Diagne; Derrick Michael Xzavierro; Vincent Rivaldi Kosasih; Marques Bolden	Philippines; Thirdy Ravena; Kib Montalbo; Kiefer Ravena; Jaydee Tungcab; Moala Tautuaa; Isaac Go; June Mar Fajardo; Roger Pogoy; Francis Lopez; Troy Rosario; William Navarro; Matthew Wright	Thailand; Antonio Price Soonthornchote; Teerawat Chanthachon; Chatpol Chungyampin; Frederick Lee Jones Lish; Nakorn Jaisanuk; Chanatip Jakrawan; Anasawee Klaewnarong; Pathiphan Klahan; Jakongmee Morgan; Moses Morgan; Nattakarn Muangboon; Jittaphon Towaroj
Women's 5x5 tournament	Philippines; Afril Bernardino; Ana Alicia Katrina Isidro; Angelica Marie Nomeron; Camille Clarin; Clare Saquing; Elisha Gabriell Bade; Ella Fajardo; France Mae Cabinbin; Janine Pontejos; Katrina Guytingco; Marizze Andrea Beja; Stefanie Berberabe	Indonesia; Adelaide Callista Wongsohardjo; Gradita Retong Augustin; Clarita Antonio; Angelica Jennifer Candra; Dyah Lestari; Sophia Gabriel; Henny Sutjiono; Kadek Pratita Citta Dewi; Kimberley Pierre-Louis; Mega Nanda Perdana Putri; Nathania Claresta Orville; Yuni Anggraeni	Malaysia; Eugene Ting Chiau Teng; Yap Fook Yee; Pang Hui Pin; Renee Lee Jo Rynn; Rajintiran Kalamaithi; Toh Ke Hui; Chia Mun Yi; Nur Izzati binti Yaakob; Lee Phei Ling; Magdalene Low Phey Chyl; Tan Sin Jie; Foo Suet Ying; Saw Wei Yin; Chong Yin Yin
Men's 3×3 tournament	Thailand; Chanatip Jakrawan; Frederick Lee Jones Lish; Moses Morgan; Antonio Price Soonthornchote	Vietnam; Đinh Thanh Tâm; Justin Young; Chris Dierker; Võ Kim Bản	Philippines; Reymar Caduyac; Brandon Ganuelas-Rosser; Jorey Napoles; Marvin Hayes
Women's 3×3 tournament	Thailand; Kanokwan Prajuapsook; Rujiwan Bunsinprom; Warunee Kitraksa; Amphawa Thuamon	Vietnam; Trương Thảo My; Trương Thảo Vy; Huỳnh Thị Ngoan; Trần Thị Anh Đào	Indonesia; Adelaide Callista Wongsohardjo; Dewa Ayu Made Sriartha Kusuma Dewi; Kimberley Pierre-Louis; Nathania Claresta Orville

== Medal table ==
* Host nation (Vietnam)

Rank	Nation	Gold	Silver	Bronze	Total
1	Thailand	2	0	1	3
2	Indonesia	1	1	1	3
2	Philippines	1	1	1	3
4	Vietnam*	0	2	0	2
5	Malaysia	0	0	1	1
Totals (5 entries)		4	4	4	12
