= O. D. Anosike =

American basketball player (born 1991)

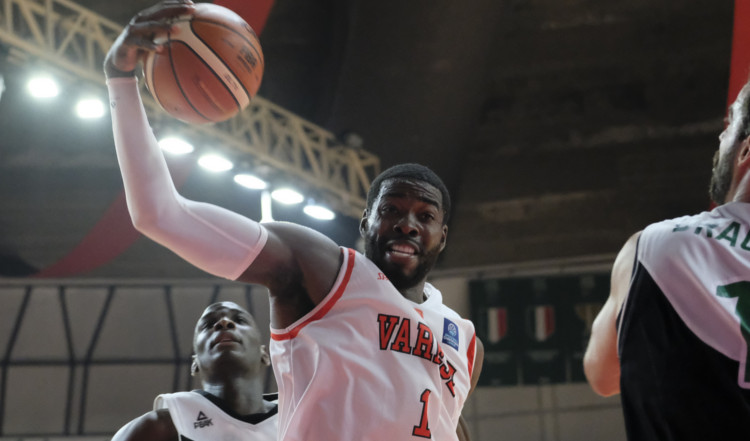
- Anosike with Varese in 2016

Gaziantep Basketbol
- Position: Center / power forward
- League: TBL

Personal information
- Born: January 3, 1991 (age 35) Staten Island, New York, U.S.
- Listed height: 6 ft 8 in (2.03 m)
- Listed weight: 245 lb (111 kg)

Career information
- High school: St. Peter's Boys; (Staten Island, New York)
- College: Siena (2009–2013)
- NBA draft: 2013: undrafted
- Playing career: 2013–present

Career history
- 2013–2014: VL Pesaro
- 2014: SIG Strasbourg
- 2014–2015: Sidigas Avellino
- 2015: AEK Athens
- 2016: Brindisi
- 2016–2017: Varese
- 2017–2018: Real Betis
- 2018–2019: Le Portel
- 2019–2020: Fuerza Regia de Monterrey
- 2020: Jeonju KCC Egis
- 2020: Fuerza Regia de Monterrey
- 2021: Lavrio
- 2021: Fuerza Regia de Monterrey
- 2021–2022: Cholet
- 2022: Fuerza Regia de Monterrey
- 2022–2023: Manisa BB
- 2023: Al-Ahly Benghazi
- 2023–2024: Mahram Tehran
- 2024: MKE Ankaragücü
- 2024: Metros de Santiago
- 2024–present: Gaziantep Basketbol

Career highlights
- LBL champion (2023); TBSL rebounding leader (2023); 3× LBA rebounding leader (2014, 2015, 2017); LBA All-Star (2014); 2× NCAA rebounding leader (2012, 2013); First-team All-MAAC (2012); Second-team All-MAAC (2013)

Oderah "O. D." Anosike (born January 3, 1991) is an American professional basketball player who last played for the Gaziantep Basketbol of the Türkiye Basketbol Ligi (TBL). He played college basketball for Siena College. In the 2011–12 NCAA Division I season, Anosike led Division I in rebounding, with a 12.5 per game average. He then repeated as the country's top rebounder in 2012–13, with an 11.4 per game average.

== College career ==
Anosike began his college basketball career in 2009–10. Anosike's contributions in his inaugural year were modest; he averaged 2.7 points and 3.4 rebounds, in 12.1 minutes per game. He was, however, only one of four Siena players to appear in all 34 of the team's games.

During Anosike's sophomore season, he averaged 8.9 points and 6.8 rebounds per game. Then-teammate Ryan Rossiter was a prolific rebounder as well, and Anosike believes he could have grabbed more rebounds that season, had it not been for Rossiter. The following year, his junior season, he nearly doubled his rebounding average, with Rossiter graduating the previous spring. Anosike averaged 15.0 points, and a nation-leading 12.5 rebounds per game, en route to a First Team All-Metro Atlantic Athletic Conference (MAAC) selection. He was also named to the Lou Henson (Mid-Major) All-American Team. During one stretch in 2011–12, Anosike recorded 17 straight double-doubles, which is a Siena record, and the second-longest streak in the previous 15 years of Division I basketball.

Anosike repeated as the nation's top rebounder in 2012–13, after grabbing 11.4 per game. He was named a Senior CLASS Award candidate as student-athlete of the year, and in January, ESPN analyst Jay Bilas declared him to be the best rebounder in men's college basketball.

== Professional career ==
=== 2013–14 season ===
After going undrafted in the 2013 NBA draft, Anosike joined the Denver Nuggets summer league team for the 2013 NBA Summer League. On August 5, 2013, he signed a one-year deal with Scavolini Pesaro of the Italian Serie A. In addition to being named a league all-star, Anosike went on to be the Serie A leading rebounder during his rookie campaign. In his first professional season, he averaged 14.3 points, 13.1 rebounds, and 1.1 steals per game for Scavolini Pesaro.

On May 18, 2014, he signed with Strasbourg IG of France for the rest of the 2014–15 LNB Pro A season.

=== 2014–15 season ===
In July 2014, Anosike joined the Boston Celtics for the 2014 NBA Summer League. On July 15, 2014, he signed a one-year deal with Sidigas Avellino of Italy.

=== 2015–16 season ===
On August 24, 2015, he signed a one-year deal with Laboral Kutxa Baskonia of the Spanish Liga ACB and the Euroleague. On October 4, he parted ways with Baskonia before appearing in a game for them. Three days later, he signed with the Greek club AEK Athens. On November 27, he parted ways with AEK after appearing in four league games and five Eurocup games.

On January 7, 2016, Anosike signed with Enel Brindisi of Italy for the rest of the 2015–16 Lega Basket Serie A season.

=== 2016–17 season ===
On July 16, 2016, Anosike signed with the Italian team Pallacanestro Varese.

=== 2020–21 season ===
On September 17, 2020, Anosike signed with Fuerza Regia de Monterrey of the Mexican Liga Nacional de Baloncesto Profesional. On January 9, 2021, Anosike moved to Lavrio of the Greek Basket League, where he clinched the league finals for the first time.

=== 2021–22 season ===
On July 27, 2021, Anosike returned to Fuerza Regia. He averaged 10.7 points, 9.2 rebounds and 2.2 assists per game. On December 20, 2021, Anosike signed with Cholet Basket of the LNB Pro A.

=== 2022–23 season ===
On August 28, 2022, he has signed with Manisa BB of the Turkish Basketbol Süper Ligi. After his season in Turkey, in 2023, Anosike played in Libya for Al-Ahly Benghazi and won the Libyan Division I Basketball League championship.

=== 2023–24 season ===
On November 4, 2023, he has signed with Mahram Tehran BC

On January 18, 2024, he has signed with MKE Ankaragücü

=== 2024–25 season ===
On December 12, 2024, Anosike signed with the Gaziantep Basketbol of the Türkiye Basketbol Ligi (TBL).

== The Basketball Tournament ==
OD Anosike played for Saints Alive in the 2018 edition of The Basketball Tournament. He scored 8 points and had 7 rebounds in the team's first-round loss to Team Fancy.

== Personal ==
Anosike is the son of Ben and Ngozi Anosike, both Nigerian immigrants. He has seven siblings: Nicky, Nneoma, Rotanna, Ikenna, Ifesinachi, Anulika, and Ejimofor. One of his sisters, Nicky, played college basketball for the Tennessee Lady Volunteers, won two national championships, and as a senior, was named the NCAA Woman of the Year. She currently plays in the WNBA.

Although his given name is Oderah, his nickname "O. D." was given to him when he was a young child. Explaining where it came from, he said, "In kindergarten the kids had trouble pronouncing Oderah, so my mom said, 'Just call him O. D., the first two letters of his name,' and it kind of stuck with me ever since." In Igbo, his name translates to, "whatever God has written, can never be taken away."

== See also ==
- List of NCAA Division I men's basketball season rebounding leaders
