= Kyndall Dykes =

American-Palestinian basketball player (born 1987)

Free agent
- Position: Shooting guard

Personal information
- Born: 12 November 1987 (age 39) New Orleans, Louisiana
- Listed height: 1.92 m (6 ft 4 in)
- Listed weight: 90 kg (198 lb)

Career information
- High school: Warren Easton
- College: Navarro College (2006–2007); New Orleans (2007–2009)
- NBA draft: 2009: undrafted
- Playing career: 2009–present

Career history
- 2009–2012: U-Mobitelco Cluj-Napoca
- 2012–2013: BC Goverla
- 2013–2014: Politekhnika-Halychyna
- 2014–2015: Hapoel Gilboa Galil
- 2015–2016: BC Mureș
- 2016–2019: U-BT Cluj-Napoca
- 2019–2020: Arka Gdynia
- 2020–2022: KK Włocławek
- 2022–2023: Al Ittihad Alexandria
- 2023: Al-Arabi
- 2023: Al-Ahly Benghazi

Career highlights
- Libyan League champion (2023); Libyan League Finals MVP (2023); Libyan League scoring champion (2023); 2× Romanian League champion (2011, 2017); 1× Romanian Supercup champion (2016); 2× Romanian Cup winner (2017, 2018); Third-team All-Sun Belt (2009)

Kyndall K. K. Dykes (born 12 November 1987) is an American-born Palestinian basketball player for Al Ittihad Alexandria of the Egyptian Basketball Super League (EBSL). He also plays for the Palestine national basketball team.

== High school and college career ==
Dykes played for Warren Easton Charter High School in New Orleans and was named to the 2005 All-New Orleans District Team and was named District MVP after averaging 18 points, 7 rebounds and 4 assists.

He then played two seasons for Navarro College of the National Junior College Athletic Association (NJCAA) and was named a first-team all-region pick.

In 2007, Dykes transferred to New Orleans where he played two seasons for the Privateers. In his second season, he was named to the third-team all-Sun Belt Conference after averaging 17.3 points per game, second most in the conference.

== Professional career ==
Dykes joined the Polish side KK Włocławek in January 2021 for a monthly try-out. In five games of the 2020–21 PLK season, Dykes has averaged 13 points (54 percent from the game), plus 3.6 rebounds, 2 assists and one steal. In two matches of the FIBA Europe Cup he added 19.5 points and had 4.5 rebounds and 4 assists. Triggered by this strong performance, Włocławek agreed to a two-year contract until June 2023, with the option of a unilateral termination by the club after the 2021–22 PLK season. Dykes chose Włocławek over several other offers from competing teams.

On July 24, 2022, Dykes joined Al Ittihad Alexandria of the Egyptian Basketball Super League.

In 2023, Dykes joined Libyan club Al-Ahly Benghazi and won the national championship with the club. He was also the league's scoring champion after averaging 23.7 points per game. Dykes was named Finals MVP, following his performance in the Final Four tournament.

== National team career ==
Dykes has been a member of the Palestine national basketball team at the 2021 FIBA Asia Cup qualification.

== Player profile ==
According to Włocławek's head coach Przemysław Frasunkiewicz, Dykes is able to guard the rival team's best players, while scoring lots of points on offense. Further, Frasunkiewicz states Dykes' value as a team player.

Kyndall's brother Kenneth played college basketball for Porterville College.
