= 2022 FIBA Asia Cup qualification =

FIBA Asia Cup qualification tournament

Tournament details
- Dates: 23 February 2018 – 28 August 2021
- Teams: 35 (from 2 confederations)

Official website
- Qualifiers website Pre-Qualifiers website

The 2022 FIBA Asia Cup qualification was a basketball competition that was played from February 2018 to August 2021, to determine the fifteen FIBA Asia-Oceania nations who would join the automatically qualified host Indonesia at the 2022 FIBA Asia Cup.

== Qualification format ==
In line with the new FIBA Calendar format implemented since 2017, FIBA Asia began their own qualifiers for 2021 FIBA Asia Cup in 2018. Pre-qualifiers were contested on sub-zone and regional basis between Division B teams – teams that did not participate in FIBA Basketball World Cup 2019 Asian Qualifiers. Eight Teams that emerged victorious in the pre-qualifiers qualified to the qualifiers joining sixteen Division A teams – participants at 2017 FIBA Asia Cup and 2019 FIBA Basketball World Cup qualification. Qualifiers started after the 2019 FIBA Basketball World Cup.

== Entrants ==
Teams entering the Qualifiers		Teams entering the Regional Pre-Qualifiers		Teams entering the Sub-Zone Pre-Qualifiers		
West Region	East Region	West Region	East Region	Gulf	South Asia	Southeast Asia
Iran; Jordan; Lebanon; Qatar; India; Kazakhstan; Iraq; Syria	Australia; China; Philippines; South Korea; New Zealand; Japan; Chinese Taipei; Hong Kong	Palestine	Macau; Guam; Fiji	Bahrain; Saudi Arabia; United Arab Emirates; Oman	Sri Lanka; Bangladesh; Maldives; Bhutan; Nepal	Indonesia; Thailand; Singapore; Malaysia; Brunei; Cambodia

== Pre-Qualifiers ==
=== Sub-Zone Pre-Qualifiers ===
Sub-Zone Pre-Qualifiers took place during the same second and third windows of 2019 FIBA Basketball World Cup Qualifiers.

All times are local.

==== Gulf ====
Teams from the Gulf region played in two different rounds, during the same second and third windows of FIBA Basketball World Cup 2019 Qualifiers. Results from both rounds were aggregated in order to qualify top two teams to the Western Region Pre-Qualifiers.

Pos	Team	Pld	W	L	PF	PA	PD	Pts	Qualification
1	Bahrain	6	5	1	472	419	+53	11	Regional Pre-Qualifiers
2	Saudi Arabia	6	4	2	505	435	+70	10	Regional Pre-Qualifiers
3	United Arab Emirates	6	3	3	485	447	+38	9	
4	Oman	6	0	6	348	509	−161	6	

Source: FIBA
Rules for classification: 1) Points; 2) Head-to-head results; 3) Points difference; 4) Points scored.

===== First round =====
The first round was held from 23 to 26 February in Bahrain, held during the second window of the 2019 FIBA Basketball World Cup qualification first round.

23 February 2018	United Arab Emirates	69–73	Bahrain	Manama
17:30	Scoring by quarter: 14–24, 23–11, 20–17, 12–21
	Pts: Alshabebi 29; Rebs: Alshabebi 9 Asts: Alajmani 10	Boxscore; Report	Pts: Kawaid 17; Rebs: 4 players 6 Asts: Al-Tawash, Hassan 3	Arena: Zain Basketball Arena; Attendance: 1,200

23 February 2018	Saudi Arabia	100–45	Oman	Manama
19:30	Scoring by quarter: 23–9, 24–13, 33–11, 20–12
	Pts: Al-Muwallad 29; Rebs: Abo-Jalas 9 Asts: Al-Marwani, Al-Muwallad, Al-Taher 4	Boxscore	Pts: Al Asmi 10; Rebs: Al Souli 8 Asts: Al Aamri, Al Rasbi, Al-Souli 2	Arena: Zain Basketball Arena; Attendance: 400

25 February 2018	Bahrain	62–69	Saudi Arabia	Manama
17:30	Scoring by quarter: 14–17, 16–20, 13–14, 19–18
	Pts: Alderazi 17; Rebs: Hassan 6 Asts: Alderazi, Hassan, Ismaeel 3	Boxscore	Pts: Al-Marwani 20; Rebs: Alsuwailem 12; Asts: Al-Muwallad 5	Arena: Zain Basketball Arena; Attendance: 1,500

25 February 2018	Oman	53–92	United Arab Emirates	Manama
19:30	Scoring by quarter: 13–23, 6–23, 11–18, 23–28
	Pts: Al Rasbi 10; Rebs: Al Halhali 10; Asts: Alharthi 4	Boxscore	Pts: M. Albreiki 14; Rebs: A. Albreiki 7 Asts: Alajmani 7	Arena: Zain Basketball Arena; Attendance: 500

26 February 2018	United Arab Emirates	90–81(OT)	Saudi Arabia	Manama
17:30	Scoring by quarter: 11–17, 24–14, 33–17, 9–29, Overtime: 13–4
	Pts: Alshabebi 24; Rebs: Alshabebi 14; Asts: Alajmani 8	Boxscore	Pts: Al-Muwallad 20; Rebs: Abo-Jalas 15; Asts: Al-Muwallad, Alsager 3	Arena: Zain Basketball Arena; Attendance: 200

26 February 2018	Bahrain	87–51	Oman	Manama
19:30	Scoring by quarter: 22–9, 19–13, 24–17, 22–12
	Pts: Alderazi, Malabes 15; Rebs: Hassan 16; Asts: Kawaid 6	Boxscore; Report	Pts: Al Aamri 14; Rebs: Al Halhali 9 Asts: M. Al-Hadidi, Al Halhali 2	Arena: Zain Basketball Arena; Attendance: 900

===== Second round =====
The second round was played from 27 to 30 June in United Arab Emirates, during the third window of the 2019 FIBA Basketball World Cup qualification second round.

27 June 2018	Saudi Arabia	76–60	Oman	Dubai
17:30	Scoring by quarter: 20–19, 20–5, 21–17, 15–19
	Pts: Al-Suwailem 19; Rebs: Jalas 10; Asts: Belal 4	Boxscore	Pts: Al-Harthi 21; Rebs: Al-Halhali 11; Asts: Al-Halhali 5	Arena: Sheikh Saeed Bin Maktoum Sports Hall

27 June 2018	United Arab Emirates	73–79	Bahrain	Dubai
19:45	Scoring by quarter: 27–26, 16–15, 20–21, 10–17
	Pts: Khalifa 24; Rebs: Alshabebi 18; Asts: Alzaabi, Khalifa 3	Boxscore	Pts: Malabes 19; Rebs: Hasan 6 Asts: Ismaeel 3	Arena: Sheikh Saeed Bin Maktoum Sports Hall

29 June 2018	Bahrain	93–91(OT)	Saudi Arabia	Dubai
17:30	Scoring by quarter: 17–23, 20–16, 15–20, 27–20, Overtime: 14–12
	Pts: Kawaid 28; Rebs: Azzam 7 Asts: Hasan 4	Boxscore	Pts: Al-Marwani 24; Rebs: Al-Suwailem 18; Asts: Belal 9	Arena: Sheikh Saeed Bin Maktoum Sports Hall

29 June 2018	Oman	73–76	United Arab Emirates	Dubai
19:45	Scoring by quarter: 18–20, 11–20, 19–19, 25–17
	Pts: Al-Halhali 22; Rebs: Al-Souli 14; Asts: Al-Halhali 4	Boxscore	Pts: Alshabebi 19; Rebs: Alshabebi 7 Asts: Alnuaimi 5	Arena: Sheikh Saeed Bin Maktoum Sports Hall

30 June 2018	Oman	66–78	Bahrain	Dubai
17:30	Scoring by quarter: 17–23, 7–19, 28–19, 14–17
	Pts: Al-Farraji 18; Rebs: Al-Farraji, Al-Halhali 7 Asts: Al-Halhali 5	Boxscore	Pts: Kawaid 14; Rebs: Kawaid 7 Asts: Kawaid, Isa, Ismaeel 2	Arena: Sheikh Saeed Bin Maktoum Sports Hall

30 June 2018	United Arab Emirates	85–88	Saudi Arabia	Dubai
19:45	Scoring by quarter: 19–21, 24–23, 22–26, 20–18
	Pts: Abdalla 16; Rebs: Alshabebi 10; Asts: Alnuaimi 6	Boxscore	Pts: Al-Muwallad 23; Rebs: Al-Marwani 10; Asts: Al-Muwallad 8	Arena: Sheikh Saeed Bin Maktoum Sports Hall

==== South Asia ====
South Asia Basketball Association (SABA) started their pre-qualifiers on 26 June 2018 in Bangladesh, during the third window of the Asian qualifiers. The top two teams advanced to the Western Region Pre-Qualifiers.

Pos	Team	Pld	W	L	PF	PA	PD	Pts	Qualification
1	Sri Lanka	4	4	0	288	208	+80	8	Regional Pre-Qualifiers
2	Bangladesh (H)	4	3	1	248	237	+11	7	Regional Pre-Qualifiers
3	Maldives	4	2	2	251	282	−31	6	
4	Bhutan	4	1	3	243	271	−28	5	
5	Nepal	4	0	4	248	280	−32	4	

Source: FIBA
Rules for classification: 1) Points; 2) Head-to-head results; 3) Points difference; 4) Points scored.
(H) Hosts

26 June 2018	Bangladesh	61–49	Bhutan	Dhaka
14:30	Scoring by quarter: 14–17, 21–14, 13–10, 13–8
	Pts: Sarkar 14; Rebs: Biswas, M.A. Rahman 7 Asts: Biswas 6	Boxscore	Pts: Phuntsho 12; Rebs: Yonten 5 Asts: Phuntsho 3	Arena: Dhanmondi Basketball Gymnasium

26 June 2018	Maldives	63–60	Nepal	Dhaka
16:00	Scoring by quarter: 17–15, 11–19, 15–16, 20–10
	Pts: Abdul Latheef 20; Rebs: Abdul Latheef 6 Asts: Zilaal, Haleem 1	Boxscore	Pts: Pradhan 22; Rebs: Subedi 5 Asts: B. Maharjan, Bhandari 2	Arena: Dhanmondi Basketball Gymnasium

27 June 2018	Nepal	65–68	Bhutan	Dhaka
14:30	Scoring by quarter: 18–21, 20–17, 12–16, 15–14
	Pts: Joshi 23; Rebs: Joshi 7 Asts: Pradhan, Shrestha 2	Boxscore	Pts: Gyeltshen, Rinchen 13; Rebs: Gyeltshen 6 Asts: Yonten 3	Arena: Dhanmondi Basketball Gymnasium

27 June 2018	Bangladesh	34–65	Sri Lanka	Dhaka
16:00	Scoring by quarter: 2–12, 7–15, 6–19, 19–19
	Pts: Khan 13; Rebs: Biswas 8 Asts: Biswas 2	Boxscore	Pts: Udumalagala 15; Rebs: Gayan 9 Asts: Randima 8	Arena: Dhanmondi Basketball Gymnasium

28 June 2018	Bhutan	66–74	Maldives	Dhaka
14:30	Scoring by quarter: 20–19, 17–24, 14–19, 15–12
	Pts: Yonten, Phuntsho 13; Rebs: Rinchen 7 Asts: Gyeltshen 4	Boxscore	Pts: Rashwaan 22; Rebs: Rashwaan 11; Asts: Zilaal 4	Arena: Dhanmondi Basketball Gymnasium

28 June 2018	Sri Lanka	70–57	Nepal	Dhaka
16:00	Scoring by quarter: 14–16, 19–13, 19–14, 18–14
	Pts: Nithushan 16; Rebs: Gayan, Nithushan 8 Asts: Randima 3	Boxscore	Pts: Singh 23; Rebs: Joshi 10; Asts: Pradhan 4	Arena: Dhanmondi Basketball Gymnasium

29 June 2018	Sri Lanka	82–57	Maldives	Dhaka
14:30	Scoring by quarter: '16–11, 27–19, 28–11, 11–16
	Pts: Udumalagala 21; Rebs: Udumalagala 9 Asts: Randima 4	Boxscore	Pts: A. Mohamed 10; Rebs: Yoosuf 5 Asts: M. Mohamed 2	Arena: Dhanmondi Basketball Gymnasium

29 June 2018	Bangladesh	79–66	Nepal	Dhaka
16:00	Scoring by quarter: 21–13, 12–15, 17–19, 29–19
	Pts: Aziz 27; Rebs: Biswas 13; Asts: Biswas 5	Boxscore	Pts: Pradhan 23; Rebs: Shah 10; Asts: Joshi 3	Arena: Dhanmondi Basketball Gymnasium

30 June 2018	Sri Lanka	71–60	Bhutan	Dhaka
14:30	Scoring by quarter: 18–8, 21–4, 18–16, 14–32
	Pts: Udumalagala 19; Rebs: Prabath 9 Asts: Suranga 3	Boxscore	Pts: Tshering Phuntsho, Yonten, Rinchen 15; Rebs: Yonten 8 Asts: Tshering Phuntsho 4	Arena: Dhanmondi Basketball Gymnasium

30 June 2018	Bangladesh	74–57	Maldives	Dhaka
16:00	Scoring by quarter: 18–11, 18–11, 17–12, 21–23
	Pts: Aziz 18; Rebs: M.S. Rahman, Biswas 7 Asts: Khan, Biswas 4	Boxscore	Pts: Husham 15; Rebs: Rashwaan 9 Asts: Zilaal 3	Arena: Dhanmondi Basketball Gymnasium

==== Southeast Asia ====
The Southeast Asia Basketball Association (SEABA) pre-qualifier took place in Nonthaburi, Thailand from 26 to 30 June, during the third window of FIBA Basketball World Cup 2019 Asian qualifiers. The round-robin format tournament featured six teams participating from which the top four advanced to the Eastern Region Pre-Qualifiers.

Pos	Team	Pld	W	L	PF	PA	PD	Pts	Qualification
1	Indonesia	5	5	0	479	298	+181	10	Regional Pre-Qualifiers
2	Thailand (H)	5	4	1	459	277	+182	9	Regional Pre-Qualifiers
3	Singapore	5	3	2	452	306	+146	8	Regional Pre-Qualifiers
4	Malaysia	5	2	3	366	308	+58	7	Regional Pre-Qualifiers
5	Brunei	5	1	4	250	476	−226	6	
6	Cambodia	5	0	5	211	552	−341	5	

Source: FIBA
Rules for classification: 1) Points; 2) Head-to-head results; 3) Points difference; 4) Points scored.
(H) Hosts

26 June 2018	Indonesia	66–64	Malaysia	Nonthaburi
12:30	Scoring by quarter: 18–17, 17–18, 15–14, 16–15
	Pts: Wuwungan 13; Rebs: Johnson 9 Asts: Johnson, Sitorus 3	Boxscore	Pts: Ting C.H. 21; Rebs: Yeo 12; Asts: Ong 5	Arena: Stadium 29

26 June 2018	Thailand	120–37	Brunei	Nonthaburi
15:30	Scoring by quarter: 34–9, 27–16, 28–4, 31–8
	Pts: Sathitsumpan 25; Rebs: Klahan 8 Asts: Sorot 9	Boxscore	Pts: Haji Noordeen, Sim 9 Rebs: Haji Noordeen 6 Asts: Sim, Lim C.C., Soon K.L. 2	Arena: Stadium 29

26 June 2018	Cambodia	47–129	Singapore	Nonthaburi
18:15	Scoring by quarter: 11–34, 11–31, 13–42, 12–22
	Pts: Dar 19; Rebs: Pheng 7 Asts: Tith 3	Boxscore	Pts: Toh Q.H. 27; Rebs: Raj 12; Asts: Kwek W.M. 10	Arena: Stadium 29

27 June 2018	Malaysia	104–43	Cambodia	Nonthaburi
13:00	Scoring by quarter: 22–7, 22–17, 36–5, 24–14
	Pts: Yew, Chin 19; Rebs: Wong 12; Asts: Wong 6	Boxscore	Pts: Dar 19; Rebs: Tep, Dar, Pheng 5 Asts: Tep, Dar 2	Arena: Stadium 29

27 June 2018	Singapore	77–83(OT)	Thailand	Nonthaburi
15:30	Scoring by quarter: 16–24, 21–17, 20–10, 16–22, Overtime: 4–10
	Pts: Kwek W.M. 17; Rebs: Goh 18; Asts: Lim, Goh 3	Boxscore	Pts: Lamb 27; Rebs: Chanatip 12; Asts: Chanatip, Darongpan 4	Arena: Stadium 29

27 June 2018	Brunei	54–116	Indonesia	Nonthaburi
18:15	Scoring by quarter: 15–30, 16–23, 11–34, 12–29
	Pts: Sim 19; Rebs: Noordeen, Hussin 4 Asts: Noordeen 3	Boxscore	Pts: Dhyaksa 21; Rebs: Johnson, Sitorus 9 Asts: Prawiro 6	Arena: Stadium 29

28 June 2018	Singapore	96–40	Brunei	Nonthaburi
13:00	Scoring by quarter: 26–8, 28–12, 24–8, 18–12
	Pts: Toh 22; Rebs: Raj 13; Asts: Liew 7	Boxscore	Pts: Hussin 9 Rebs: Noordeen 5 Asts: Onn, Hussin, Chong 2	Arena: Stadium 29

28 June 2018	Thailand	69–61	Malaysia	Nonthaburi
15:30	Scoring by quarter: 27–14, 6–18, 19–15, 17–14
	Pts: Chanatip 22; Rebs: Teerawat 8 Asts: Bandit 4	Boxscore	Pts: Wong 16; Rebs: Ong 8 Asts: Ong 3	Arena: Stadium 29

28 June 2018	Indonesia	137–36	Cambodia	Nonthaburi
18:15	Scoring by quarter: 29–7, 28–6, 39–9, 41–14
	Pts: Dhyaksa 31; Rebs: Johnson 11; Asts: Prawiro 14	Boxscore	Pts: Dar 15; Rebs: Dar 7 Asts: Dar 2	Arena: Stadium 29

29 June 2018	Malaysia	51–80	Singapore	Nonthaburi
13:00	Scoring by quarter: 15–20, 15–20, 12–15, 9–25
	Pts: Ting C.H., Wong 11; Rebs: Ting C.H. 9 Asts: Ong, Heng 4	Boxscore	Pts: Leon Kwek 27; Rebs: Goh 10; Asts: Wong, Goh 4	Arena: Stadium 29

29 June 2018	Indonesia	75–74	Thailand	Nonthaburi
15:30	Scoring by quarter: 30–13, 14–20, 11–23, 20–18
	Pts: Johnson 23; Rebs: Wuwungan 11; Asts: Dhyaksa 3	Boxscore	Pts: Lamb 28; Rebs: Chanatip 12; Asts: Lamb 5	Arena: Stadium 29

29 June 2018	Cambodia	58–69	Brunei	Nonthaburi
18:15	Scoring by quarter: 13–17, 15–13, 17–15, 13–24
	Pts: Tep 17; Rebs: Pheng 8 Asts: Tep, Dar 3	Boxscore	Pts: Noordeen 21; Rebs: Hussin 10; Asts: Noordeen 5	Arena: Stadium 29

30 June 2018	Singapore	70–85	Indonesia	Nonthaburi
13:00	Scoring by quarter: 15–18, 16–23, 22–23, 17–21
	Pts: Kwek W.M. 25; Rebs: Goh 20; Asts: Wong, Goh 3	Boxscore	Pts: Johnson 22; Rebs: Wuwungan, Johnson 6 Asts: Prawiro 6	Arena: Stadium 29

30 June 2018	Thailand	113–27	Cambodia	Nonthaburi
15:30	Scoring by quarter: 31–6, 25–4, 29–7, 28–10
	Pts: Tawatchai 31; Rebs: Chatpol 20; Asts: Nakorn 6	Boxscore	Pts: Dar 13; Rebs: Pheng 6 Asts: Dar 3	Arena: Stadium 29

30 June 2018	Brunei	50–86	Malaysia	Nonthaburi
18:15	Scoring by quarter: 11–22, 12–20, 12–24, 15–20
	Pts: Noordeen 14; Rebs: Onn 6 Asts: Noordeen 3	Boxscore	Pts: Chin 29; Rebs: Mak 20; Asts: Wong, Ong 5	Arena: Stadium 29

=== Regional Pre-Qualifiers ===
Regional pre-qualifiers featured the twelve teams in total: eight teams advanced from the sub-zone pre-qualifiers and four teams which receive a bye to this stage. They were divided into two regions: Western Region (5 teams) and Eastern Region (7 teams). The top four teams from each region advanced to the Qualifiers.

==== Eastern Region Pre-Qualifiers ====
The Pre-Qualifiers (Eastern Region) was held in Nonthaburi, Thailand from 26 November to 1 December 2018, during the fifth window of 2019 World Cup qualification.

The seven teams were divided into two groups. The top three teams of each group qualified to the second round, where they were pitted against the teams in the opposite groups. Head-to-head results from the first round were carried out.

===== First round =====
====== Group A ======
Pos	Team	Pld	W	L	PF	PA	PD	Pts	Qualification
1	Malaysia	2	2	0	153	132	+21	4	Second round
2	Indonesia	2	1	1	160	124	+36	3	Second round
3	Macau	2	0	2	125	182	−57	2	Second round

Source: FIBA
Rules for classification: 1) Points; 2) Head-to-head results; 3) Points difference; 4) Points scored.

26 November 2018	Indonesia	61–70	Malaysia	Nonthaburi
12:30	Scoring by quarter: 20–10, 12–23, 13–20, 16–17
	Pts: Johnson 15; Rebs: Johnson 14; Asts: Wisnu 5	Boxscore	Pts: Chang Z.F. 18; Rebs: Chang Z.F., Ting C.H. 5 Asts: Foo T.J., Wong Y.H., Mak L.S. 2	Arena: Stadium 29; Referees: Mohammad Doost (IRN), Yuji Higashi (JPN), Chen Ying-cheng (TPE)

27 November 2018	Malaysia	83–71	Macau	Nonthaburi
12:30	Scoring by quarter: 27–11, 13–17, 22–21, 21–22
	Pts: Ting C.H. 20; Rebs: Yek L.C. 7 Asts: Kuek T.Y. 5	Boxscore	Pts: Lam W.H., Sou W.C. 11; Rebs: Lam W.H. 6 Asts: Kou C.K. 4	Arena: Stadium 29; Referees: Alexey Stepanenko (KAZ), Glenn Cornelio (PHI), Leong Chuen Wing (SIN)

28 November 2018	Macau	54–99	Indonesia	Nonthaburi
17:30	Scoring by quarter: 20–22, 12–31, 9–21, 13–25
	Pts: Lo H.M. 22; Rebs: Kou C.K. 5 Asts: Lam T.L. 5	Boxscore	Pts: Prastawa 19; Rebs: Haq 9 Asts: Indrawan 5	Arena: Stadium 29; Referees: Preeda Muongmee (THA), Sadegh Ghanbaridamanab (IRN), Leong Chuen Wing (SGP)

====== Group B ======
Pos	Team	Pld	W	L	PF	PA	PD	Pts	Qualification
1	Guam	3	3	0	291	182	+109	6	Second round
2	Thailand (H)	3	2	1	230	208	+22	5	Second round
3	Singapore	3	1	2	208	258	−50	4	Second round
4	Fiji	3	0	3	175	256	−81	3	

Source: FIBA
Rules for classification: 1) Points; 2) Head-to-head results; 3) Points difference; 4) Points scored.
(H) Hosts

26 November 2018	Singapore	65–83	Thailand	Nonthaburi
15:00	Scoring by quarter: 18–22, 17–27, 16–17, 14–17
	Pts: Lim 12; Rebs: Goh 12; Asts: Kwek 4	Boxscore	Pts: Morgan, Jakrawan 19; Rebs: Jakrawan 11; Asts: Sunthonsiri 6	Arena: Stadium 29; Referees: Alexey Stepanenko (KAZ), Sadegh Ghanbaridamanab (IRN), Haryanto Sutaryo (INA)

26 November 2018	Fiji	55–93	Guam	Nonthaburi
17:30	Scoring by quarter: 14–26, 18–19, 12–31, 11–17
	Pts: U. Koroi, Fox 16; Rebs: Fox 17; Asts: Tabuduka 2	Boxscore	Pts: Ross 19; Rebs: Washington 8 Asts: Hechanova 4	Arena: Stadium 29; Referees: Joenard Garcia (PHI), Preeda Muongmee (THA), Leong Chuen Wing (SIN)

27 November 2018	Thailand	77–52	Fiji	Nonthaburi
15:00	Scoring by quarter: 25–15, 19–14, 20–5, 13–18
	Pts: Chanthachon 14; Rebs: Saengtong 13; Asts: Ananti 7	Boxscore	Pts: Fox 20; Rebs: Fox 13; Asts: Fox, Naivalurua 2	Arena: Stadium 29; Referees: Mohammad Doost (IRN), Joenard Garcia (PHI), Chen Ying-cheng (TPE)

27 November 2018	Singapore	57–107	Guam	Nonthaburi
17:30	Scoring by quarter: 11–33, 13–28, 17–25, 16–21
	Pts: Liew, Wong Z.H. 11; Rebs: Lim, Wong Z.H. 6 Asts: Lim 3	Boxscore	Pts: Ross 19; Rebs: R. Wesley 10; Asts: Hechanova 9	Arena: Stadium 29; Referees: Sadegh Ghanbaridamanab (IRN), Haryanto Sutaryo (INA), Yuji Higashi (JPN)

28 November 2018	Fiji	68–86	Singapore	Nonthaburi
12:30	Scoring by quarter: 19–22, 6–18, 17–23, 26–23
	Pts: Fox 29; Rebs: Fox 22; Asts: Fox 7	Boxscore	Pts: Kwek 21; Rebs: Goh 12; Asts: Goh 5	Arena: Stadium 29; Referees: Joenard Garcia (PHI), Yuji Higashi (JPN), Chen Ying-cheng (TPE)

28 November 2018	Guam	91–70	Thailand	Nonthaburi
15:00	Scoring by quarter: 23–24, 20–17, 24–11, 24–18
	Pts: Ross 31; Rebs: T. Wesley 10; Asts: Stinnett 4	Boxscore	Pts: Ananti 17; Rebs: Chanthachon 12; Asts: Sunthonsiri 6	Arena: Stadium 29; Referees: Mohammad Doost (IRN), Alexey Stepanenko (KAZ), Glenn Cornelio (PHI)

===== Second round =====
Pos	Team	Pld	W	L	PF	PA	PD	Pts	Qualification
1	Guam	5	5	0	461	322	+139	10	Qualifiers
2	Malaysia	5	3	2	372	372	0	8 (Note: Malaysia 1–1 +5 PD; Thailand 1–1 -2 PD; Indonesia 1–1 -3 PD)	Qualifiers
3	Thailand (H)	5	3	2	378	358	+20	8	Qualifiers
4	Indonesia	5	3	2	351	311	+40	8	Qualifiers
5	Singapore	5	1	4	335	416	−81	6	
6	Macau	5	0	5	338	456	−118	5	

Source: FIBA
Rules for classification: 1) Points; 2) Head-to-head results; 3) Points difference; 4) Points scored.
(H) Hosts
Notes:

29 November 2018	Malaysia	66–60	Singapore	Nonthaburi
13:00	Scoring by quarter: 12–20, 18–14, 9–19, 27–7
	Pts: Wong 20; Rebs: Kuek 12; Asts: Kuek, Ong 3	Boxscore	Pts: Kwek 19; Rebs: Goh 12; Asts: Wong 3	Arena: Stadium 29; Referees: Glenn Cornelio (PHI), Preeda Moungmee (THA), Sadegh Ghanbaridamanab (IRN)

29 November 2018	Thailand	81–56	Macau	Nonthaburi
15:30	Scoring by quarter: 13–11, 22–11, 25–13, 21–21
	Pts: Saengtong 23; Rebs: Chanthachon 13; Asts: Leelaphipatkul 6	Boxscore	Pts: Lei S.W. 10; Rebs: Sou W.C. 6 Asts: Lam T.L. 4	Arena: Stadium 29; Referees: Chen Ying-cheng (TPE), Haryanto Sutaryo (INA), Leong Chuen Wing (SIN)

29 November 2018	Guam	65–53	Indonesia	Nonthaburi
18:00	Scoring by quarter: 15–20, 25–12, 9–10, 16–11
	Pts: T. Wesley 19; Rebs: Washington, T. Wesley 11; Asts: Hechanova 8	Boxscore	Pts: Johnson 15; Rebs: Johnson 10; Asts: Putra 7	Arena: Stadium 29; Referees: Yuji Higashi (JPN), Alexey Stepanenko (KAZ), Joenard Garcia (PHI)

30 November 2018	Singapore	57–67	Indonesia	Nonthaburi
13:00	Scoring by quarter: 18–23, 7–12, 19–16, 13–16
	Pts: Kwek 18; Rebs: Raj, Lim, Wong 5 Asts: Toh 4	Boxscore	Pts: Prastawa 14; Rebs: Johnson 10; Asts: Putra, Wisnu 3	Arena: Stadium 29; Referees: Chen Ying-cheng (TPE), Sadegh Ghanbaridamanab (IRN), Alexey Stepanenko (KAZ)

30 November 2018	Malaysia	75–79	Thailand	Nonthaburi
15:30	Scoring by quarter: 16–22, 13–18, 17–23, 29–16
	Pts: Wong Y.H. 22; Rebs: Chang Z.F. 6 Asts: Foo T.J., Chang Z.F. 3	Boxscore	Pts: Morgan 25; Rebs: Morgan 12; Asts: Leelaphipatkul 3	Arena: Stadium 29; Referees: Yuji Higashi (JPN), Mohammad Doost (IRN), Joenard Garcia (PHI)

30 November 2018	Macau	64–97	Guam	Nonthaburi
18:00	Scoring by quarter: 14–30, 10–22, 20–23, 20–22
	Pts: Lo 13; Rebs: Lam W. 9 Asts: Lam T. 7	Boxscore	Pts: Ross 17; Rebs: R. Wesley, T. Wesley 19; Asts: R. Wesley 5	Arena: Stadium 29; Referees: Preeda Moungmee (THA), Glenn Cornelio (PHI), Haryanto Sutaryo (INA)

1 December 2018	Guam	101–78	Malaysia	Nonthaburi
12:30	Scoring by quarter: 33–12, 24–23, 21–25, 23–18
	Pts: Ross 33; Rebs: Hechanova 13; Asts: Hechanova 11	Boxscore	Pts: Chang 20; Rebs: Mak, Ting 6 Asts: Thong, Ong 4	Arena: Stadium 29; Referees: Alexey Stepanenko (KAZ), Chen Ying-cheng (TPE), Leong Chuen Wing (SIN)

1 December 2018	Indonesia	71–65	Thailand	Nonthaburi
15:00	Scoring by quarter: 17–17, 18–22, 18–11, 18–15
	Pts: Wisnu 17; Rebs: Johnson 8 Asts: Prastawa 5	Boxscore	Pts: Morgan 35; Rebs: Jakrawan 8 Asts: Apiromvilaichai 7	Arena: Stadium 29; Referees: Sadegh Ghanbaridamanab (IRN), Joenard Garcia (PHI), Glenn Cornelio (PHI)

1 December 2018	Singapore	96–93	Macau	Nonthaburi
17:30	Scoring by quarter: 26–21, 22–23, 27–35, 21–14
	Pts: Toh 17; Rebs: Raj 11; Asts: four players 3	Boxscore	Pts: Lo 20; Rebs: Lo 9 Asts: Lo 5	Arena: Stadium 29; Referees: Preeda Moungmee (THA), Mohammad Doost (IRN), Yuji Higashi (JPN)

==== Western Region Pre-Qualifiers ====
The FIBA Asia Cup 2021 pre-qualifiers (Western Region) were held in Bahrain from 11 to 15 September 2018, during the fourth window of 2019 World Cup qualification. On 14 August 2018, the competition schedules has been confirmed.

Pos	Team	Pld	W	L	PF	PA	PD	Pts	Qualification
1	Saudi Arabia	4	4	0	384	246	+138	8	Qualifiers
2	Palestine	4	3	1	369	241	+128	7	Qualifiers
3	Bahrain (H)	4	2	2	338	259	+79	6	Qualifiers
4	Sri Lanka	4	1	3	204	364	−160	5	Qualifiers
5	Bangladesh	4	0	4	217	402	−185	4	

Source: FIBA
Rules for classification: 1) Points; 2) Head-to-head results; 3) Points difference; 4) Points scored.
(H) Hosts

11 September 2018	Palestine	104–49	Bangladesh	Manama
17:00	Scoring by quarter: 21–13, 17–14, 29–14, 37–8
	Pts: San. Sakakini 31; Rebs: San. Sakakini 16; Asts: Hill 7	Boxscore	Pts: Khan, Biswas 15; Rebs: M.S. Rahman 8 Asts: Aziz 3	Arena: Zain Basketball Arena; Referees: Mohammad Taha (JOR), Leong Chuen Wing (SIN), Ceciline Victor (IND)

11 September 2018	Sri Lanka	47–85	Bahrain	Manama
19:00	Scoring by quarter: 15–14, 14–33, 14–18, 4–20
	Pts: Udumalagala 14; Rebs: Udumalagala 9 Asts: Randima 3	Boxscore	Pts: Isa 16; Rebs: Kawaid, Hasan 9 Asts: Altawash 7	Arena: Zain Basketball Arena; Referees: Alexey Stepanenko (KAZ), Hadi Salem (IRI), Saif Al Dossari (QAT)

12 September 2018	Saudi Arabia	85–76	Palestine	Manama
17:00	Scoring by quarter: 12–17, 22–24, 30–14, 21–21
	Pts: Abdel Gabar 22; Rebs: Alsuwailem 11; Asts: Abdel Gabar 4	Boxscore	Pts: San. Sakakini 28; Rebs: San. Sakakini 22; Asts: Hill, San. Sakakini 4	Arena: Zain Basketball Arena; Referees: Alexey Stepanenko (KAZ), Leong Chuen Wing (SIN), Ceciline Victor (IND)

12 September 2018	Bangladesh	60–63	Sri Lanka	Manama
19:00	Scoring by quarter: 13–6, 10–12, 18–18, 19–27
	Pts: Biswas 19; Rebs: Biswas 13; Asts: M.S. Rahman, Khan 3	Boxscore	Pts: Udumalagala 17; Rebs: Cooray 9 Asts: Udumalagala 4	Arena: Zain Basketball Arena; Referees: Hadi Salem (IRI), Issam Nasser Al Siyabi (OMA), Saif Al Dossari (QAT)

13 September 2018	Sri Lanka	44–107	Saudi Arabia	Manama
17:00	Scoring by quarter: 11–28, 9–24, 15–23, 9–32
	Pts: Udumalagala 18; Rebs: Cooray 10; Asts: Udumalagala, Thevakumar 2	Boxscore	Pts: Mohammed, Alabsi 18; Rebs: Alhawsawi 14; Asts: Fallatah 8	Arena: Zain Basketball Arena; Referees: Ceciline Victor (IND), Leong Chuen Wing (SIN), Issam Nasser Al Siyabi (OMA)

13 September 2018	Bahrain	126–52	Bangladesh	Manama
19:00	Scoring by quarter: 23–13, 39–19, 34–9, 30–11
	Pts: Ismaeel 23; Rebs: Altawash, Hammooda 7 Asts: Altawash 9	Boxscore	Pts: Biswas 16; Rebs: Sarkar 7 Asts: Islam 3	Arena: Zain Basketball Arena; Referees: Alexey Stepanenko (KAZ), Hadi Salem (IRI), Saif Al Dossari (QAT)

14 September 2018	Palestine	112–50	Sri Lanka	Manama
17:00	Scoring by quarter: 28–11, 27–9, 25–19, 32–11
	Pts: San. Sakakini 26; Rebs: San. Sakakini 12; Asts: Abu-Shamala 9	Boxscore	Pts: Udumalagala 20; Rebs: Randima 6 Asts: Randima 5	Arena: Zain Basketball Arena; Referees: Leong Chuen Wing (SIN), Ceciline Victor (IND), Issam Nasser Al Siyabi (OMA)

14 September 2018	Saudi Arabia	83–70	Bahrain	Manama
19:00	Scoring by quarter: 24–19, 20–18, 16–27, 23–6
	Pts: Al-Muwallad 26; Rebs: Abdel Gabar 10; Asts: Abdel Gabar 11	Boxscore	Pts: Kawaid 20; Rebs: Kawaid, Hammooda 7 Asts: Altawash 9	Arena: Zain Basketball Arena; Referees: Alexey Stepanenko (KAZ), Mohammad Taha (JOR), Hadi Salem (IRI)

15 September 2018	Bangladesh	56–109	Saudi Arabia	Manama
17:00	Scoring by quarter: 13–37, 15–30, 12–22, 16–20
	Pts: Biswas 20; Rebs: Sarkar 6 Asts: Sarkar 4	Boxscore	Pts: Alsuwailem 21; Rebs: Kadi 10; Asts: Ma. Al-Marwani 6	Arena: Zain Basketball Arena; Referees: Alexey Stepanenko (KAZ), Issam Nasser Al Siyabi (OMA), Saif Al Dossari (QAT)

15 September 2018	Bahrain	57–77	Palestine	Manama
19:00	Scoring by quarter: 9–20, 12–16, 22–21, 14–20
	Pts: Hammooda 20; Rebs: Hasan 8 Asts: Altawash, Kawaid 4	Boxscore	Pts: San. Sakakini 29; Rebs: San. Sakakini 18; Asts: Hill 9	Arena: Zain Basketball Arena; Referees: Mohammad Taha (JOR), Leong Chuen Wing (SIN), Ceciline Victor (IND)

== Qualifiers ==
=== Participating teams ===
Teams entering the Qualifiers		Teams qualified through the Regional Pre-Qualifiers	
West Region	East Region	West Region	East Region
Iran; Jordan; Lebanon; Qatar; India; Kazakhstan; Iraq; Syria	Australia; China; Philippines; South Korea; New Zealand; Japan; Chinese Taipei; Hong Kong	Saudi Arabia; Palestine; Bahrain; Sri Lanka	Guam; Malaysia; Thailand; Indonesia

=== Draw ===
The draw for the main qualifiers was held on 8 June 2019 in Bangalore, India. Eight pots were used for the seeding of the 24 qualified teams based on geographical and ranking principles. The first four pots were allocated for teams in the East Region, covering teams from the EABA (East Asia), SEABA (Southeast Asia), and FIBA Oceania and the rest for teams in the West Region which has the GBA (Gulf), WABA (Middle East), CABA (Central Asia), and SABA (South Asia) in its scope. The top seeded teams for each region were allocated in Pot 1 and 5. The top six seeded teams were confirmed on 31 May 2019 based on the FIBA ranking as of 26 February 2019.

East Region
Pot 1	Pot 2	Pot 3	Pot 4
Australia (11); China (30); Philippines (31)	South Korea (32); New Zealand (38); Japan (48)	Chinese Taipei (57); Guam (77); Indonesia (85)	Hong Kong (101); Thailand (102); Malaysia (113)
West Region
Pot 5	Pot 6	Pot 7	Pot 8
Iran (27); Jordan (49); Lebanon (53)	Qatar (63); India (67); Kazakhstan (70)	Iraq (80); Syria (89); Palestine (92)	Saudi Arabia (104); Bahrain (112); Sri Lanka (117)

All times are local.

=== First round ===
Due to the COVID-19 pandemic, the FIBA Executive Committee decided in September 2020, that the games played in the November 2020 and February 2021 windows would be held at a single venue under a bubble format. Games from Group B, C, and F as well as games involving South Korea were not held during the 2020 November window. Top two teams from each group qualified for the 2021 FIBA Asia cup, while all third-placed teams competed in the second round. After the June 2021 window, all games not played were cancelled and groups were ranked based on the games played to date.

==== Group A ====
Indonesia was confirmed as hosts of the 2021 FIBA Asia Cup on 18 December 2020, therefore qualifying for the tournament proper regardless of their final placing.

Pos	Team	Pld	W	L	PF	PA	PD	Pts	Qualification
1	Philippines	6	6	0	525	406	+119	12	2022 FIBA Asia Cup
2	South Korea	6	4	2	581	459	+122	10	2022 FIBA Asia Cup
3	Indonesia	6	2	4	454	534	−80	8	2022 FIBA Asia Cup as host
4	Thailand	6	0	6	414	575	−161	6	

Source: FIBA
Rules for classification: 1) Points; 2) Head-to-head results; 3) Points difference; 4) Points scored.

20 February 2020	Indonesia	76–109	South Korea	Jakarta
19:00	Scoring by quarter: 27–21, 10–34, 14–36, 25–18
	Pts: Grahita 25; Rebs: Sitorus 5 Asts: Lakudu 5	Boxscore	Pts: Kim N. 14; Rebs: Kang, Yang 7 Asts: Kim N. 5	Arena: The BritAma Arena; Attendance: 1,952; Referees: Ryan Jones (NZL), Shigeyuki Arisawa (JPN), Leong Chuen Wing (SGP)

23 February 2020	South Korea	93–86	Thailand	Seoul
15:00	Scoring by quarter: 18–16, 20–24, 27–19, 28–27
	Pts: Kim J. 16; Rebs: Kim J. 7 Asts: Kim N., Doo 6	Boxscore	Pts: Lamb 28; Rebs: Lamb 12; Asts: Muangboon 5	Arena: Jamsil Arena; Referees: Yu Jung (TPE), Martin Davison (NZL), Wissam Zein (SYR)

23 February 2020	Indonesia	70–100	Philippines	Jakarta
18:00	Scoring by quarter: 15–18, 13–19, 25–30, 17–33
	Pts: Prastawa 28; Rebs: Kosasih 8 Asts: Grahita 3	Boxscore	Pts: T. Ravena 23; Rebs: T. Ravena 8 Asts: Nieto 6	Arena: The BritAma Arena; Attendance: 2,335; Referees: Ryan Jones (NZL), Shigeyuki Arisawa (JPN), Leong Chuen Wing (SGP)

27 November 2020 (Note: Originally scheduled for 20 February 2020. However the game was delayed to a later date amid concerns over the COVID-19 pandemic.)	Philippines	93–61	Thailand	Manama
16:00	Scoring by quarter: 21–19, 32–10, 22–14, 18–18
	Pts: Ramos 20; Rebs: Paras, Ramos 7 Asts: M. Nieto 6	Boxscore	Pts: Wongsawangtham 17; Rebs: Ghogar 7 Asts: Muangboon 7	Arena: Khalifa Sports City Stadium; Referees: Mohammad Alamiri (KUW), Paul Skayem (LBN), Mohamed Hasan Alsalam (BHR)

28 November 2020	Thailand	76–90	Indonesia	Manama
16:00	Scoring by quarter: 20–18, 27–30, 13–22, 16–20
	Pts: Muangboon 32; Rebs: Jakrawan 13; Asts: Muangboon 8	Boxscore	Pts: Grahita, Jawato 22; Rebs: Prosper 13; Asts: Jawato 8	Arena: Khalifa Sports City Stadium; Referees: Yevgeniy Mikheyev (KAZ), Paul Skayem (LBN), Mohammad Taha (JOR)

30 November 2020	Thailand	69–93	Philippines	Manama
16:00	Scoring by quarter: 19–27, 15–26, 18–22, 17–18
	Pts: Jakrawan 34; Rebs: Jakrawan 12; Asts: Suttisin 4	Boxscore	Pts: Ja. Gómez de Liaño 19; Rebs: Baltazar 11; Asts: three players 4	Arena: Khalifa Sports City Stadium; Referees: Yevgeniy Mikheyev (KAZ), Paul Skayem (LBN), Mohammad Taha (JOR)

16 June 2021 (Note: The match, originally scheduled for the November 2020 window was postponed.)	South Korea	78–81	Philippines	Angeles City
18:00	Scoring by quarter: 21–12, 23–24, 13–20, 21–25
	Pts: Ra 24; Rebs: Ra 15; Asts: Byeon 7	Boxscore	Pts: Ramos 16; Rebs: Baltazar, Sotto 7 Asts: Abarrientos, Navarro 3	Arena: AUF Sports and Cultural Center; Referees: Rabah Noujaim (LBN), Ahmed Al-Shuwaili (IRQ), Leong Chuen Wing (SIN)

17 June 2021	South Korea	104–81	Indonesia	Angeles City
14:30	Scoring by quarter: 27–12, 25–23, 25–23, 27–23
	Pts: Ra 23; Rebs: Lee H., Yang 9 Asts: Kim, Lee D. 6	Boxscore	Pts: Prosper 25; Rebs: Prosper 12; Asts: Wisnu 4	Arena: AUF Sports and Cultural Center; Referees: Ahmed Al-Shuwaili (IRQ), Rabah Noujaim (LIB), Leong Chuen Wing (SIN)

18 June 2021 (Note: The match, originally scheduled for the February 2021 window was postponed.)	Philippines	76–51	Indonesia	Angeles City
18:00	Scoring by quarter: 15–11, 15–11, 21–14, 25–16
	Pts: Baltazar, Kouame 11; Rebs: Ramos 12; Asts: Abarrientos 6	Boxscore	Pts: Prosper 22; Rebs: Prosper 8 Asts: Prastawa 5	Arena: AUF Sports and Cultural Center; Referees: Leong Chuen Wing (SIN), Rabah Noujaim (LIB), Ahmed Al-Shuwaili (IRQ)

19 June 2021	Thailand	53–120	South Korea	Angeles City
18:00	Scoring by quarter: 12–23, 6–37, 14–25, 21–35
	Pts: Suttisin 12; Rebs: Jakrawan 9 Asts: Muangboon, Towaroj 5	Boxscore	Pts: Ha 34; Rebs: Ha, Lee S. 10; Asts: Byeon 6	Arena: AUF Sports and Cultural Center; Referees: Ahmed Al-Shuwaili (IRQ), Rabah Noujaim (LIB), Leong Chuen Wing (SIN)

20 June 2021	Indonesia	86–69	Thailand	Angeles City
11:30	Scoring by quarter: 21–18, 28–14, 18–22, 19–15
	Pts: Prosper 22; Rebs: Prosper 11; Asts: Lakudu, Prastawa 5	Boxscore	Pts: Muangboon 14; Rebs: Jakrawan 8 Asts: Muangboon 7	Arena: AUF Sports and Cultural Center; Referees: Ricor Buaron (PHI), Lee Kyoung-hwan (KOR), Joenard Garcia (PHI)

20 June 2021	Philippines	82–77	South Korea	Angeles City
15:00	Scoring by quarter: 18–20, 20–14, 18–20, 26–23
	Pts: Ramos 19; Rebs: Kouame 8 Asts: Ramos 5	Boxscore	Pts: Ra 20; Rebs: Ra 8 Asts: Lee D. 10	Arena: AUF Sports and Cultural Center; Referees: Rabah Noujaim (LBN), Ahmed Al-Shuwaili (IRQ), Leong Chuen Wing (SIN)

==== Group B ====
Pos	Team	Pld	W	L	PF	PA	PD	Pts	Qualification
1	China	4	4	0	362	280	+82	8	2022 FIBA Asia Cup
2	Japan	4	2	2	335	274	+61	6	2022 FIBA Asia Cup
3	Chinese Taipei	5	1	4	409	448	−39	6	Second round
4	Malaysia	1	0	1	48	152	−104	1	

Source: FIBA
Rules for classification: 1) Points; 2) Head-to-head results; 3) Points difference; 4) Points scored.

21 February 2020	Chinese Taipei	152–48	Malaysia	Taipei
19:00	Scoring by quarter: 27–18, 37–14, 44–8, 44–8
	Pts: Huang J. 22; Rebs: Tseng 14; Asts: Huang H.H., Chiang 7	Boxscore	Pts: Wee Y. 16; Rebs: Thea, Chee 4 Asts: Wee Y. 3	Arena: Heping Basketball Gymnasium; Referees: Scott Paul Beker (AUS), Budi Marfan (INA), Shin Gi-rok (KOR)

24 February 2020	Chinese Taipei	57–96	Japan	Taipei
19:00	Scoring by quarter: 12–24, 17–14, 6–24, 22–34
	Pts: Chen Y. 13; Rebs: Chen Y. 5 Asts: Chen Y. 3	Boxscore	Pts: Rossiter, Kanamaru 17; Rebs: Rossiter 19; Asts: Rossiter 7	Arena: Heping Basketball Gymnasium; Referees: Scott Paul Beker (AUS), Budi Marfan (INA), Shin Gi-rok (KOR)

16 June 2021 (Note: Originally scheduled for 21 February 2020. However the game was delayed to a later date amid concerns over the COVID-19 pandemic.)	Japan	57–66	China	Angeles City
14:30	Scoring by quarter: 12–20, 8–12, 15–18, 22–16
	Pts: Hiejima, Kanamaru 12; Rebs: Edwards, Harimoto 6 Asts: Ando 4	Boxscore	Pts: Zhou 16; Rebs: Zhang 7 Asts: Zhao J. 7	Arena: AUF Sports and Cultural Center; Referees: Ferdinand Pascual (PHI), Harja Jaladri (INA), Lee Kyoung-hwan (KOR)

17 June 2021	Chinese Taipei	66–115	China	Angeles City
18:00	Scoring by quarter: 16–37, 16–30, 15–24, 19–24
	Pts: Hsieh 25; Rebs: Su 6 Asts: Ku 6	Boxscore	Pts: three players 16; Rebs: Zhang 11; Asts: Xu 8	Arena: AUF Sports and Cultural Center; Referees: Harja Jaladri (INA), Ricor Buaron (PHI), Budi Marfan (INA)

18 June 2021	Japan	98–61	Chinese Taipei	Angeles City
14:30	Scoring by quarter: 25–16, 27–22, 28–10, 18–13
	Pts: Edwards 21; Rebs: Schafer 10; Asts: Edwards, Vendrame 6	Boxscore	Pts: Ku 11; Rebs: Chen, Su 4 Asts: Hsieh, Morrison 3	Arena: AUF Sports and Cultural Center; Referees: Ferdinand Pascual (PHI), Budi Marfan (INA), Joenard Garcia (PHI)

19 June 2021	China	90–84	Japan	Angeles City
14:30	Scoring by quarter: 21–29, 20–16, 24–24, 25–15
	Pts: Zhou Q. 18; Rebs: Zhou Q. 12; Asts: Xu, Zhao J. 5	Boxscore	Pts: Togashi 17; Rebs: Takeuchi 5 Asts: Tanaka 7	Arena: AUF Sports and Cultural Center; Referees: Harja Jaladri (INA), Ferdinand Pascual (PHI), Lee Kyoung-hwan (KOR)

20 June 2021	China	91–73	Chinese Taipei	Angeles City
18:30	Scoring by quarter: 28–16, 21–23, 27–14, 15–20
	Pts: Zhou 21; Rebs: Shen 14; Asts: Zhao J. 6	Boxscore	Pts: Wu C. 13; Rebs: Su 9 Asts: Li 4	Arena: AUF Sports and Cultural Center; Referees: Ferdinand Pascual (PHI), Budi Marfan (INA), Harja Jaladri (INA)

Cancelled (Note: Originally scheduled for 24 February 2020. However the game was delayed to a later date amid concerns over the COVID-19 pandemic.)	China	vs.	Malaysia

Cancelled	Malaysia	vs.	Japan

Cancelled	Malaysia	vs.	Chinese Taipei

Cancelled	Malaysia	vs.	China

Cancelled	Japan	vs.	Malaysia

==== Group C ====
Pos	Team	Pld	W	L	PF	PA	PD	Pts	Qualification
1	Australia	3	2	1	294	212	+82	5	2022 FIBA Asia Cup
2	New Zealand	3	2	1	273	273	0	5	2022 FIBA Asia Cup
3	Guam	3	2	1	309	262	+47	5	Second round
4	Hong Kong	3	0	3	201	330	−129	3	

Source: FIBA
Rules for classification: 1) Points; 2) Head-to-head results; 3) Points difference; 4) Points scored.

20 February 2020	Australia	98–108	New Zealand	Brisbane
18:40	Scoring by quarter: 31–27, 15–25, 27–30, 25–26
	Pts: Blanchfield 17; Rebs: Hodgson 9 Asts: Cadee 5	Boxscore	Pts: Ili, Te Rangi 21; Rebs: Te Rangi 6 Asts: Ili, Te Rangi 5	Arena: Nissan Arena; Attendance: 3,423; Referees: Ferdinand Pascual (PHI), Takaki Kato (JPN), Chuang Chih-Chun (TPE)

23 February 2020	Australia	115–52	Hong Kong	Brisbane (Note: Originally scheduled to be held in Hong Kong but was moved to a venue in Australia amid concerns over the COVID-19 pandemic.)
12:40	Scoring by quarter: 18–12, 33–16, 36–13, 28–11
	Pts: Gliddon 21; Rebs: Gliddon, Glover 6 Asts: Sobey, Giddey 6	Boxscore	Pts: Leung 16; Rebs: Reid 12; Asts: Ip 3	Arena: Nissan Arena; Attendance: 1,035; Referees: Ferdinand Pascual (PHI), Takaki Kato (JPN), Chuang Chih-Chun (TPE)

23 February 2020	Guam	94–113	New Zealand	Yigo
17:00	Scoring by quarter: 24–22, 19–34, 24–30, 27–27
	Pts: Ross 21; Rebs: Galloway 8 Asts: Je. Cruz 5	Boxscore	Pts: Ili 25; Rebs: Ili 8 Asts: Ili 7	Arena: Calvo Fieldhouse; Attendance: 2,200; Referees: James Alexander Boyer (AUS), Vaughan Mayberry (AUS), Park Kyoung-jin (KOR)

20 February 2021	New Zealand	52–81	Australia	Cairns
18:30	Scoring by quarter: 12–23, 11–10, 20–22, 9–26
	Pts: Murray 14; Rebs: Janssen 9 Asts: O'Riley 5	Boxscore	Pts: Daniels 23; Rebs: Kenyon 10; Asts: Daniels 4	Arena: Cairns Pop-Up Arena; Referees: James Boyer (AUS), Guy Richards (AUS), Jack Taylor (AUS)

13 June 2021 (Note: Originally scheduled to be held in Hong Kong on 20 February 2020 but was moved to a venue in Guam amid concerns over the COVID-19 pandemic. However Hong Kong players were barred entry as part of preventive measure by Guam Governor Lou Leon Guerrero. The matches were scheduled for February 2021, but were postponed again.)	Guam	103–83	Hong Kong	Amman
16:00	Scoring by quarter: 35–19, 22–21, 24–20, 22–23
	Pts: T. Wesley 25; Rebs: Hechanova 15; Asts: T. Wesley 9	Boxscore	Pts: So 18; Rebs: Yeung M. 6 Asts: Wong 6	Arena: Prince Hamzah Hall; Referees: Mohammad Al-Amiri (KUW), Mohammad Taha (JOR), Saif Al-Dossari (QAT)

15 June 2021	Hong Kong	66–112	Guam	Amman
11:00	Scoring by quarter: 8–30, 18–33, 19–21, 21–28
	Pts: Chan Y. 17; Rebs: Choi 7 Asts: Chan Y. 4	Boxscore	Pts: Cruz 20; Rebs: T. Wesley 15; Asts: Hechanova 7	Arena: Prince Hamzah Hall; Referees: Anan Daraghma (PLE), Wissam Zein (SYR), Mohammad Taha (JOR)

Cancelled	Guam	vs.	Australia

Cancelled	New Zealand	vs.	Hong Kong

Cancelled	New Zealand	vs.	Guam

Cancelled	Hong Kong	vs.	Australia

Cancelled	Hong Kong	vs.	New Zealand

Cancelled	Australia	vs.	Guam

==== Group D ====
Pos	Team	Pld	W	L	PF	PA	PD	Pts	Qualification
1	Lebanon	6	6	0	597	428	+169	12	2022 FIBA Asia Cup
2	Bahrain	6	4	2	491	526	−35	10	2022 FIBA Asia Cup
3	India	6	2	4	445	523	−78	8	Second round
4	Iraq	6	0	6	459	515	−56	6	

Source: FIBA
Rules for classification: 1) Points; 2) Head-to-head results; 3) Points difference; 4) Points scored.

21 February 2020	Bahrain	68–67	India	Manama
19:00	Scoring by quarter: 19–14, 9–24, 19–14, 21–15
	Pts: Ebrahim 18; Rebs: Giles 15; Asts: Ebrahim 6	Boxscore	Pts: A. Singh 17; Rebs: Hafeez 8 Asts: J. Singh, Bhriguvanshi 4	Arena: Khalifa Sports City Stadium; Attendance: 2,750; Referees: Ricor Buaron (PHI), Alexey Stepanenko (KAZ), Saif Al Dossari (QAT)

21 February 2020	Lebanon	87–68	Iraq	Zouk Mikael
21:00	Scoring by quarter: 19–15, 25–18, 18–24, 25–11
	Pts: Arakji 21; Rebs: Haidar 7 Asts: Arakji, Zeinoun, Mansour 4	Boxscore	Pts: Mayfield 23; Rebs: Hameed 6 Asts: Mayfield 6	Arena: Nouhad Nawfal Sports Complex; Attendance: 1,863; Referees: Harja Jaladri (INA), Michael Aylen (AUS), Mohammad Fawzi Taha (JOR)

24 February 2020	Iraq	75–94	India	Baghdad
19:00	Scoring by quarter: 21–26, 20–21, 19–28, 15–19
	Pts: Abdullah 26; Rebs: Mayfield 9 Asts: Mayfield 4	Boxscore	Pts: Hafeez 24; Rebs: A. Singh 10; Asts: Hafeez 8	Arena: Al Shaeb Hall; Attendance: 2,000; Referees: Ahmed Al Bulushi (OMA), Ricor Buaron (PHI), Alexey Stepanenko (KAZ)

24 February 2020	Lebanon	116–73	Bahrain	Zouk Mikael
21:00	Scoring by quarter: 27–16, 23–15, 30–19, 36–23
	Pts: Chamoun 26; Rebs: Majok 11; Asts: Mezher 9	Boxscore	Pts: Giles 21; Rebs: Giles 9 Asts: 5 players 2	Arena: Nouhad Nawfal Sports Complex; Attendance: 2,239; Referees: Harja Jaladri (INA), Michael Aylen (AUS), Mohammad Fawzi Taha (JOR)

27 November 2020	India	60–115	Lebanon	Manama
13:00	Scoring by quarter: 14–24, 18–31, 13–27, 15–33
	Pts: A. Singh 25; Rebs: Pri. Singh 8 Asts: Bhriguvanshi 5	Boxscore	Pts: Arakji 20; Rebs: El Beyrouty 7 Asts: Zeinoun 7	Arena: Khalifa Sports City Stadium; Referees: Yevgeniy Mikheyev (KAZ), Issam Nasser Al Siyabi (OMA), Wissam Zein (SYR)

27 November 2020	Iraq	92–95(OT)	Bahrain	Manama
19:00	Scoring by quarter: 16–18, 15–27, 24–15, 23–18, Overtime: 14–17
	Pts: Mayfield 26; Rebs: Al-Zuhairi 9 Asts: Abdulqader 8	Boxscore	Pts: Ebrahim 30; Rebs: Giles 11; Asts: Kawaid 5	Arena: Khalifa Sports City Stadium; Referees: Harja Jaladri (INA), Mohammad Taha (JOR), Anton Kozlov (KAZ)

29 November 2020	Iraq	69–78	Lebanon	Manama
13:00	Scoring by quarter: 16–14, 24–22, 11–30, 18–12
	Pts: Mayfield 22; Rebs: Mayfield 8 Asts: Abdulqader, Mayfield 9	Boxscore	Pts: Arakji 25; Rebs: Haidar 7 Asts: Mansour 4	Arena: Khalifa Sports City Stadium; Referees: Wissam Zein (SYR), Anton Kozlov (KAZ), Issam Al-Siyabi (OMA)

29 November 2020	India	72–88	Bahrain	Manama
19:00	Scoring by quarter: 25–11, 20–26, 8–29, 19–22
	Pts: Bhriguvanshi 18; Rebs: A. Singh 9 Asts: Hafeez 4	Boxscore	Pts: Ebrahim, Giles 17; Rebs: Giles 12; Asts: Kawaid 6	Arena: Khalifa Sports City Stadium; Referees: Yevgeniy Mikheyev (KAZ), Paul Skayem (LBN), Mohammad Taha (JOR)

20 February 2021	India	81–78	Iraq	Manama
16:00	Scoring by quarter: 24–25, 23–13, 13–21, 21–19
	Pts: Hafeez 22; Rebs: A. Singh 4 Asts: Hafeez 7	Boxscore	Pts: Galloway 24; Rebs: Galloway 9 Asts: Galloway 7	Arena: Khalifa Sports City Stadium; Referees: Mohammad Al-Amiri (KUW), Ricor Buaron (PHI), Park Kyoung-jin (KOR)

20 February 2021	Bahrain	87–102	Lebanon	Manama
19:00	Scoring by quarter: 20–19, 24–32, 28–28, 15–23
	Pts: Mohamed 20; Rebs: Hammooda 7 Asts: Kawaid 7	Boxscore	Pts: El Darwich 19; Rebs: Hadidian 13; Asts: El Darwich 5	Arena: Khalifa Sports City Stadium; Referees: Alexey Stepanenko (KAZ), Preeda Muongmee (THA), Mohammad Doost (IRN)

22 February 2021	Lebanon	99–71	India	Manama
17:00	Scoring by quarter: 26–19, 25–25, 28–14, 20–13
	Pts: Chartouny 24; Rebs: Hadidian 12; Asts: Mansour 8	Boxscore	Pts: Annadurai 19; Rebs: Sandhu 10; Asts: Bhriguvanshi 5	Arena: Khalifa Sports City Stadium; Referees: Preeda Muongmee (THA), Alexey Stepanenko (KAZ), Park Kyoung-jin (KOR)

22 February 2021	Bahrain	80–77	Iraq	Manama
20:00	Scoring by quarter: 16–22, 15–14, 26–13, 23–28
	Pts: Isa 21; Rebs: Giles 11; Asts: Ebrahim, Kawaid 3	Boxscore	Pts: Galloway 18; Rebs: Galloway 11; Asts: Galloway 8	Arena: Khalifa Sports City Stadium; Referees: Ricor Buaron (PHI), Budi Marfan (INA), Hadi Salem (IRN)

==== Group E ====
Pos	Team	Pld	W	L	PF	PA	PD	Pts	Qualification
1	Iran	6	5	1	484	351	+133	11	2022 FIBA Asia Cup
2	Syria	6	3	3	416	448	−32	9 (Note: Syria 152–149 Saudi Arabia)	2022 FIBA Asia Cup
3	Saudi Arabia	6	3	3	418	417	+1	9	Second round
4	Qatar	6	1	5	357	459	−102	7	

Source: FIBA
Rules for classification: 1) Points; 2) Head-to-head results; 3) Points difference; 4) Points scored.
Notes:

20 February 2020	Iran	94–48	Syria	Tehran
16:00	Scoring by quarter: 17–15, 28–13, 24–9, 25–11
	Pts: Jamshidi 19; Rebs: Haddadi 14; Asts: Haddadi 9	Boxscore	Pts: Al-Hamwi, Jlilaty 11; Rebs: Jlilaty 4 Asts: four players 2	Arena: Azadi Basketball Hall; Attendance: 3,000; Referees: Nicolas Fernandes (TAH), Paul Skayem (LBN), Anton Kozlov (KAZ)

20 February 2020	Saudi Arabia	68–57	Qatar	Jeddah
19:15	Scoring by quarter: 27–18, 15–14, 16–13, 10–12
	Pts: Ma. Al-Marwani 20; Rebs: Mo. Al-Marwani 12; Asts: Abdel Gabar 6	Boxscore	Pts: Mujkic 10; Rebs: Saad, Abdelbaset 5 Asts: Abdelkawy 5	Arena: King Abdullah Sports City; Attendance: 1,800; Referees: Yevgeniy Mikheyev (KAZ), Daigo Urushima (JPN), Alexandr Rulyov (KAZ)

23 February 2020	Iran	95–52	Qatar	Tehran
16:00	Scoring by quarter: 24–9, 21–18, 22–13, 28–12
	Pts: Rezaeifar 19; Rebs: Haddadi, Jamshidi 8 Asts: Haddadi 5	Boxscore	Pts: Mujkic 14; Rebs: Abdelhaleem, Dieng, Mujkic 5 Asts: four players 2	Arena: Azadi Basketball Hall; Referees: Nicolas Fernandes (TAH), Paul Skayem (LBN), Anton Kozlov (KAZ)

23 February 2020	Saudi Arabia	70–75(OT)	Syria	Jeddah
19:15	Scoring by quarter: 8–17, 12–16, 23–20, 20–10, Overtime: 7–12
	Pts: Abdel Gabar 24; Rebs: Alsuwailem 15; Asts: Al-Muwallad, Belal, Abdel Gabar 2	Boxscore	Pts: Merjaneh 17; Rebs: Al-Hamwi 8 Asts: Merjaneh 7	Arena: King Abdullah Sports City; Attendance: 2,000; Referees: Yevgeniy Mikheyev (KAZ), Daigo Urushima (JPN), Alexandr Rulyov (KAZ)

28 November 2020	Iran	71–64	Saudi Arabia	Doha
16:00	Scoring by quarter: 22–12, 16–21, 11–15, 22–16
	Pts: Yakhchali 27; Rebs: Geramipoor, Mirzaei 6 Asts: Yakhchali 9	Boxscore	Pts: Alsuwailem, Abdel Gabar 13; Rebs: Alsuwailem 9 Asts: Abdel Gabar 4	Arena: Al-Gharafa Sports Club Multi-Purpose Hall; Referees: Rabah Noujaim (LBN), Alexey Stepanenko (KAZ), Mohammed Al-Tarawneh (JOR)

28 November 2020	Qatar	79–72	Syria	Doha
19:00	Scoring by quarter: 20–18, 13–19, 19–21, 27–14
	Pts: Saad 23; Rebs: Abdelhaleem, Saad 7 Asts: Yousuf 4	Boxscore	Pts: Kell 35; Rebs: Saddir 9 Asts: Kell 6	Arena: Al-Gharafa Sports Club Multi-Purpose Hall; Referees: Ahmed Al-Shuwaili (IRQ), Ahmed Al-Bulushi (OMA), Taha Al-Hashedi (YEM)

30 November 2020	Syria	77–70	Iran	Doha
16:00	Scoring by quarter: 21–21, 19–21, 18–13, 19–15
	Pts: Kell 34; Rebs: Kell 8 Asts: Merjaneh, Kell 4	Boxscore	Pts: Jamshidi 13; Rebs: three players 6 Asts: Jamshidi 8	Arena: Al-Gharafa Sports Club Multi-Purpose Hall; Referees: Rabah Noujaim (LBN), Ahmed Al-Bulushi (OMA), Mohammed Al-Tarawneh (JOR)

30 November 2020	Qatar	67–73(OT)	Saudi Arabia	Doha
19:00	Scoring by quarter: 21–17, 16–20, 10–13, 13–10, Overtime: 7–13
	Pts: Dieng 12; Rebs: Saeed 9 Asts: Saad 5	Boxscore	Pts: Abdel Gabar 15; Rebs: Alsuwailem 13; Asts: Al-Salik 6	Arena: Al-Gharafa Sports Club Multi-Purpose Hall; Referees: Ahmed Al-Shuwaili (IRQ), Alexey Stepanenko (KAZ), Taha Al-Hashedi (YEM)

12 June 2021	Syria	77–79(OT)	Saudi Arabia	Amman
13:00	Scoring by quarter: 20–19, 14–20, 22–19, 13–11, Overtime: 8–10
	Pts: Herring 22; Rebs: Alsati 9 Asts: Herring 5	Boxscore	Pts: Abdel Gabar 21; Rebs: Alsuwailem 13; Asts: Ma. Al-Marwani 5	Arena: Prince Hamzah Hall; Referees: Ahmed Al-Bulushi (OMA), Paul Skayem (LBN), Alexey Stepanenko (KAZ)

12 June 2021	Qatar	46–84	Iran	Amman
16:00	Scoring by quarter: 13–22, 10–19, 18–25, 5–18
	Pts: Haračić 17; Rebs: Avdić 11; Asts: Saeed 3	Boxscore	Pts: Nikkhah 16; Rebs: Hassanzadeh 11; Asts: Jamshidi 8	Arena: Prince Hamzah Hall; Referees: Mohammad Taha (JOR), Taha Al-Hasehdi (YEM), Anan Daraghma (PLE)

14 June 2021	Saudi Arabia	64–70	Iran	Amman
13:00	Scoring by quarter: 16–20, 17–14, 15–15, 16–21
	Pts: Abdel Gabar 24; Rebs: Al-Suwailem 8 Asts: Abdel Gabar 6	Boxscore	Pts: Rezaeifar 16; Rebs: Kazemi 13; Asts: Jamshidi 5	Arena: Prince Hamzah Hall; Referees: Ahmed Al-Buluhsi (QAT), Alexey Stepanenko (KAZ), Taha Al-Hashedi (YEM)

14 June 2021	Syria	67–56	Qatar	Amman
16:00	Scoring by quarter: 14–9, 19–20, 14–15, 20–12
	Pts: Herring 16; Rebs: Herring 9 Asts: Herring 9	Boxscore	Pts: Saad 22; Rebs: Dieng 11; Asts: Dieng, Saad 4	Arena: Prince Hamzah Hall; Referees: Mohammad Al-Amiri (KUW), Paul Skayem (LIB), Mohammad Taha (JOR)

==== Group F ====
Pos	Team	Pld	W	L	PF	PA	PD	Pts	Qualification
1	Jordan	5	5	0	418	336	+82	10	2022 FIBA Asia Cup
2	Kazakhstan	6	4	2	528	372	+156	10	2022 FIBA Asia Cup
3	Palestine	6	2	4	516	473	+43	8	Second round
4	Sri Lanka	5	0	5	268	549	−281	5	

Source: FIBA
Rules for classification: 1) Points; 2) Head-to-head results; 3) Points difference; 4) Points scored.

21 February 2020	Kazakhstan	79–76	Palestine	Nur-Sultan
20:00	Scoring by quarter: 18–19, 19–20, 25–24, 17–13
	Pts: Bykov 16; Rebs: Bykov 10; Asts: Clemmons 6	Boxscore	Pts: San. Sakakini 44; Rebs: San. Sakakini 10; Asts: Krayem 7	Arena: Zhekpe-zhek Saray; Attendance: 2,455; Referees: Ahmed Al-Shuwaili (IRQ), Hatim Alharbi (KSA), Haryanto Sutaryo (INA)

21 February 2020	Jordan	100–45	Sri Lanka	Amman
19:00	Scoring by quarter: 18–16, 40–5, 24–7, 18–17
	Pts: Abuwazaneh, Abu Hawwas 16; Rebs: Abuwazaneh 12; Asts: Tucker, Kanaan 5	Boxscore	Pts: Milidduwa Gamage 16; Rebs: Mendis 8 Asts: Nimesh 4	Arena: Prince Hamza; Attendance: 3,883; Referees: Preeda Muongmee (THA), Chan Owe Shiong (MAS), Chung Yi-Chih (TPE)

24 February 2020	Kazakhstan	68–71	Jordan	Nur-Sultan
20:00	Scoring by quarter: 13–15, 19–15, 12–20, 24–21
	Pts: Clemmons 19; Rebs: Clemmons, Gavrilov 7 Asts: Clemmons 8	Boxscore	Pts: Ibrahim 27; Rebs: Tucker 9 Asts: Ibrahim 3	Arena: Zhekpe-zhek Saray; Attendance: 2,365; Referees: Ahmed Al-Shuwaili (IRQ), Hatim Alharbi (KSA), Haryanto Sutaryo (INA)

24 February 2020	Palestine	102–60	Sri Lanka	Jenin
20:00	Scoring by quarter: 33–11, 18–15, 24–17, 27–17
	Pts: Krayem 25; Rebs: San. Sakakini 13; Asts: Krayem 9	Boxscore	Pts: Athapaththu Mudiyanselage 24; Rebs: Nimesh 6 Asts: Thevakumar 4	Arena: Arab American University; Attendance: 2,000; Referees: Andris Aunkrogers (LAT), Chan Owe Shiong (MAS), Chung Yi-Chih (TPE)

18 February 2021	Sri Lanka	52–111	Kazakhstan	Manama
16:00	Scoring by quarter: 13–28, 16–25, 11–31, 12–27
	Pts: Nimesh 13; Rebs: four players 3 Asts: Thevakumar 8	Boxscore	Pts: Clemmons 14; Rebs: Marchuk 8 Asts: Clemmons, Murzagaliyev 5	Arena: Khalifa Sports City Stadium; Referees: Rabah Noujaim (LBN), Mohamed Al-Salam (BHR), Saif Al-Dossari (QAT)

19 February 2021	Palestine	56–93	Kazakhstan	Manama
16:00	Scoring by quarter: 18–20, 13–21, 9–23, 16–29
	Pts: Dykes 22; Rebs: Dykes 10; Asts: Mayali 5	Boxscore	Pts: Clemmons 20; Rebs: Marchuk 8 Asts: Clemmons 5	Arena: Khalifa Sports City Stadium; Referees: Rabah Noujaim (LBN), Budi Marfan (INA), Hadi Salem (IRN)

21 February 2021	Sri Lanka	74–129	Palestine	Manama
16:00	Scoring by quarter: 19–38, 15–32, 20–31, 20–29
	Pts: Thevakumar 20; Rebs: Mendis, Nimesh 6 Asts: Thevakumar 14	Boxscore	Pts: Sakakini 36; Rebs: Sakakini 24; Asts: Dykes 14	Arena: Khalifa Sports City Stadium; Referees: Mohammad Al-Amiri (KUW), Wissam Zein (SYR), Saif Al-Dossari (QAT)

22 February 2021	Kazakhstan	107–37	Sri Lanka	Manama
11:00	Scoring by quarter: 37–2, 29–11, 19–13, 22–11
	Pts: Bykov 21; Rebs: Ponomarev 9 Asts: Murzagaliyev 9	Boxscore	Pts: Mahamuhandiramge 9 Rebs: Mahamuhandiramge 4 Asts: Brent, Thevakumar 3	Arena: Khalifa Sports City Stadium; Referees: Mohammad Doost (IRN), Mohamed Al-Salam (BHR), Wissam Zein (SYR)

12 June 2021 (Note: The match, originally scheduled for the February 2021 window was postponed after several Jordan players tested positive for COVID-19.)	Palestine	77–88	Jordan	Amman
19:00	Scoring by quarter: 18–21, 15–21, 22–27, 22–19
	Pts: Dykes 31; Rebs: Sakakini 9 Asts: Sakakini 10	Boxscore	Pts: Al-Dwairi 20; Rebs: Alhamarsheh 10; Asts: Ibrahim 6	Arena: Prince Hamzah Hall; Referees: Mohammad Doost (IRN), Mohammad Al-Amri (KUW), Wissam Zein (SYR)

13 June 2021	Jordan	80–70	Kazakhstan	Amman
19:00	Scoring by quarter: 19–18, 15–21, 25–12, 21–19
	Pts: Al-Dwairi 26; Rebs: Al-Dwairi 14; Asts: Abu Hawwas 6	Boxscore	Pts: Bazhin, Gavrilov 14; Rebs: Bazhin 10; Asts: Murzagaliyev 6	Arena: Prince Hamzah Hall; Referees: Paul Skayem (LIB), Ahmed Al-Bulishi (OMA), Wissam Zein (SYR)

14 June 2021	Jordan	79–76	Palestine	Amman
19:00	Scoring by quarter: 17–17, 29–24, 12–20, 21–15
	Pts: Ibrahim 17; Rebs: Hussein 9 Asts: Ibrahim 9	Boxscore	Pts: Sakakini 28; Rebs: Sakakini 15; Asts: Mayali 6	Arena: Prince Hamzah Hall; Referees: Mohammad Doost (IRI), Wissam Zein (SYR), Saif Al-Dossari (QAT)

Cancelled	Sri Lanka	vs.	Jordan

=== Second round ===
Teams were divided into two groups based on geographical criteria. In total, three teams from this round qualified for the main tournament.

==== Group G ====
As Indonesia, the 2022 FIBA Asia Cup host, finished third in Group A, they did not participate. Instead, Guam and Chinese Taipei played twice against each other in Mangilao, Guam. On 10 August 2021, tip-off times have been confirmed.

All times are local.

Team 1	Agg.	Team 2	1st leg	2nd leg
Chinese Taipei	157–154	Guam	72–77	85–77

26 August 2021	Guam	77–72	Chinese Taipei	Mangilao
19:00	Scoring by quarter: 16–25, 22–20, 19–9, 20–18
	Pts: Wesley 23; Rebs: Galloway 16; Asts: Hechanova, Wesley 3	Boxscore	Pts: Chen 24; Rebs: Lee T. 5 Asts: Chen 3	Attendance: 125; Referees: Ricor Buaron (PHI), Lee Kyoung-hwan (KOR), Daigo Urushima (JPN)

28 August 2021	Chinese Taipei	85–77	Guam	Mangilao
14:00	Scoring by quarter: 16–23, 26–15, 27–25, 16–14
	Pts: Lin T. 26; Rebs: Hu 5 Asts: Chen 7	Boxscore	Pts: Johnson 18; Rebs: Galloway 14; Asts: Hechanova, Wesley 3	Referees: Ricor Buaron (PHI), Park Kyoung-jin (KOR), Daigo Urushima (JPN)

==== Group H ====
Matches took place from 20 to 22 August 2021, in Jeddah, Saudi Arabia. On 10 August 2021, tip-off times were confirmed.

All times are local.

Pos	Team	Pld	W	L	PF	PA	PD	Pts	Qualification
1	Saudi Arabia (H)	2	2	0	176	133	+43	4	2022 FIBA Asia Cup
2	India	2	1	1	140	157	−17	3	2022 FIBA Asia Cup
3	Palestine	2	0	2	149	175	−26	2	

Source: FIBA
Rules for classification: 1) Points; 2) Head-to-head results; 3) Points difference; 4) Points scored.
(H) Hosts

20 August 2021	India	61–80	Saudi Arabia	Jeddah
18:15	Scoring by quarter: 8–20, 22–16, 16–20, 15–24
	Pts: Joginder 17; Rebs: Amritpal 9 Asts: Amjyot, Joginder 4	Boxscore	Pts: Abdel-Gabar 17; Rebs: Al-Suwailem 12; Asts: Al-Marwani 4	Arena: King Abdullah Sports City; Attendance: 2,500; Referees: Rabah Noujaim (LBN), Ahmed Al-Bulushi (OMA), Paul Skayem (LBN)

21 August 2021	Palestine	77–79	India	Jeddah
18:15	Scoring by quarter: 25–13, 21–23, 15–16, 16–27
	Pts: Dykes 32; Rebs: Sakakini 14; Asts: Dykes 10	Boxscore	Pts: Amritpal 30; Rebs: Amritpal 12; Asts: Bhriguvanshi 7	Arena: King Abdullah Sports City; Attendance: 195; Referees: Rabah Noujaim (LBN), Ahmed Al-Bulushi (OMA), Mohamed Al-Salam (BRN)

22 August 2021	Saudi Arabia	96–72	Palestine	Jeddah
18:15	Scoring by quarter: 27–15, 32–14, 25–22, 12–21
	Pts: Al-Marwani 17; Rebs: Al-Marwani 7 Asts: Belal 8	Boxscore	Pts: Dykes 22; Rebs: Sakakini 12; Asts: Dykes 6	Arena: King Abdullah Sports City; Attendance: 2,100; Referees: Rabah Noujaim (LBN), Ahmed Al-Bulushi (OMA), Paul Skayem (LBN)

== Qualified teams ==
Team	Qualification method	Date of qualification	App	Last	Best placement in tournament
Lebanon	Group D top two	29 November 2020	10th	2017	Runners-up (2001, 2005, 2007)
Bahrain	Group D top two	29 November 2020	9th	2013	10th place (1997)
Indonesia	Host nation	18 December 2020	18th	2011	4th place (1967)
Iran	Group E top two	12 June 2021	18th	2017	Champions (2007, 2009, 2013)
Kazakhstan	Group F top two	12 June 2021	10th	2017	4th place (2007)
Jordan	Group F top two	13 June 2021	16th	2017	Runners-up (2011)
Syria	Group E top two	14 June 2021	7th	2017	4th place (2001)
Philippines	Group A top two	17 June 2021	28th	2017	Champions (1960, 1963, 1967, 1973, 1985)
South Korea	Group A top two	17 June 2021	30th	2017	Champions (1969, 1997)
China	Group B top two	20 June 2021	23rd	2017	Champions (1975, 1977, 1979, 1981, 1983, 1987, 1989, 1991, 1993, 1995, 1999, 2001, 2003, 2005, 2011, 2015)
Japan	Group B top two	20 June 2021	29th	2017	Champions (1965, 1971)
Australia	Group C top two	20 June 2021	2nd	2017	Champions (2017)
New Zealand	Group C top two	20 June 2021	2nd	2017	4th place (2017)
Saudi Arabia	Group H top two	22 August 2021	9th	2013	3rd place (1999)
India	Group H top two	22 August 2021	25th	2017	4th place (1975)
Chinese Taipei	Group G winner	28 August 2021	25th	2017	Runners-up (1960, 1963)

== Statistical leaders ==
As of 28 August 2021.

=== Players ===
Points

Pos.	Name	PPG
1	(Palestine) Sani Sakakini	25.4
2	(Iraq) DeMario Mayfield	23.5
3	(Palestine) Kyndall Dykes	23.3
4	(Indonesia) Lester Prosper	22.0
5	(India) Amritpal Singh	19.5

Rebounds

Pos.	Name	RPG
1	(Palestine) Sani Sakakini	12.9
2	(Indonesia) Lester Prosper	11.0
3	(Bahrain) C. J. Giles	10.7
4	(Saudi Arabia) Mohammed Alsuwailem	10.4
5	(South Korea) Ra Gun-ah	9.8

Assists

Pos.	Name	APG
1	(Palestine) Kyndall Dykes	6.8
2	(Iraq) DeMario Mayfield	6.5
3	(Sri Lanka) Clinton Stallone Thevakumar	6.0
3	(South Korea) Lee Dae-sung	6.0
5	(Thailand) Nattakarn Muangboon	5.8

Blocks

Pos.	Name	BPG
1	(Saudi Arabia) Mohammed Alsuwailem	2.9
2	(Lebanon) Ater Majok	2.8
3	(South Korea) Lee Hyun-jung	1.8
4	(Syria) Abdulwahab Al-Hamwi	1.5
5	(India) Amjyot Singh	1.3

Steals

Pos.	Name	SPG
1	(Lebanon) Sergio El Darwich	3.0
2	(Palestine) Jamal Mayali	2.8
3	(Lebanon) Karim Zeinoun	2.5
4	(Saudi Arabia) Fahad Belal	2.3
5	(Qatar) Abdulrahman Saad	2.2

Minutes

Pos.	Name	MPG
1	(Iraq) DeMario Mayfield	39.6
2	(Palestine) Kyndall Dykes	37.7
3	(Palestine) Sani Sakakini	36.6
4	(Saudi Arabia) Khalid Abdel Gabar	36.6
5	(Indonesia) Lester Prosper	35.4

Free throws

Pos.	Name	FT%
1	(Lebanon) Wael Arakji	100.0
1	(Lebanon) Ali Haidar	100.0
3	(Iraq) DeMario Mayfield	95.5
4	(Indonesia) Abraham Damar Grahita	88.9
5	(Bahrain) Mohamed Kowaid	85.0

Field goal shooting

Pos.	Name	FG%
1	(South Korea) Ra Gun-ah	62.2
2	(Kazakhstan) Anthony Clemmons	54.9
3	(Lebanon) Wael Arakji	54.3
4	(Bahrain) Muzamil Ameer Hamooda	52.9
5	(Guam) Tai Wesley	52.9

Double-doubles

Pos.	Name	DblDbl
1	(Palestine) Sani Sakakini	7
2	(Saudi Arabia) Mohammed Alsuwailem	4
3	(Bahrain) C. J. Giles	3
3	(Indonesia) Lester Prosper	3
3	(Palestine) Kyndall Dykes	3

Other statistical leaders

Stat	Name	Avg.
3-point FG percentage	(Japan) Kosuke Kanamaru	61.9%
Turnovers	(Sri Lanka) Clinton Stallone Thevakumar	5.0
Fouls	(Jordan) Mohammad Hussein	3.8
