= 2022–23 Libyan Division I Basketball League =

Libyan Division I Basketball League
- Season: 2022–23
- Dates: 11 December 2022 - 18 July 2023
- Teams: 13

Finals
- Champions: Al-Ahly Benghazi (3rd title)
- Runners-up: Al Ahly Tripoli
- Finals MVP: (Palestine) Kyndall Dykes (Al-Ahly B.)

Statistical leaders
| Points | (Palestine) Dykes (142) (Ahly B.) | (Palestine) Dykes (23.7) (Ahly B.) |
| Rebounds | (United States) Anosike (Ahly B.) (Egypt) Osama (Ahly T.) (70) | (Algeria) Harat (15.5) |
| Assists | (Egypt) Osama (Ahly T.) (Libya) El-Sadi (Ahly T.) (23) | (Egypt) Osama (Ahly T.) (Libya) El-Sadi (Ahly T.) (3.8) |
| Efficiency | (Bosnia and Herzegovina) Kikanović (129.0) (Al-Nasser) | |

Records
- Biggest home win: Ahly B. 125 - 38 Al-Tahadi Jan. 26, 2023
- Biggest away win: Al-Tahadi 26 - 116 Al-Nasser Jan. 14, 2023
- Winning streak: 23 Al-Ahly Benghazi
- Losing streak: 13 Al-Madina

The 2022–23 Libyan Basketball League, is top level of professional basketball in Libya, Al-Ahly Tripoli were defending champions.

== Preliminary round ==
Teams are divided into two groups, one with 7 teams and one with 6 teams. All teams play a double round-robin format in their respective group. Only the top 4 teams in each group advance to the next round of the season.

=== Group A ===
| Pos | Team | Pld | W | L | PF | PA | PD | Pts | Qualification |
|---|---|---|---|---|---|---|---|---|---|
| 1 | Al-Ahly Tripoli (Q) | 12 | 11 | 1 | 845 | 583 | +262 | 23 | Advance to the second round |
| 2 | Al-Ittihad (Q) | 12 | 10 | 2 | 796 | 628 | +168 | 22 | Advance to the second round |
| 3 | Al-Shabab Al-Arabi (Q) | 12 | 9 | 3 | 713 | 639 | +74 | 21 | Advance to the second round |
| 4 | Al-Madina (Q) | 12 | 5 | 7 | 640 | 682 | −42 | 17 | Advance to the second round |
| 5 | Al-Jazeera (E) | 12 | 4 | 8 | 711 | 813 | −102 | 16 | Eliminated |
| 6 | Abu Salem (E) | 12 | 3 | 9 | 582 | 785 | −203 | 15 | Eliminated |
| 7 | Belkhaier (E) | 12 | 0 | 12 | 671 | 828 | −157 | 12 | Eliminated |

Source: Kooora Website
(E) Eliminated; (Q) Qualified for the phase indicated

=== Group B ===
| Pos | Team | Pld | W | L | PF | PA | PD | Pts | Qualification |
|---|---|---|---|---|---|---|---|---|---|
| 1 | Al-Ahly Benghazi (Q) | 10 | 10 | 0 | 738 | 517 | +221 | 20 | Advance to the second round |
| 2 | Al-Nasser (Q) | 10 | 8 | 2 | 708 | 469 | +239 | 18 | Advance to the second round |
| 3 | Al-Muroj (Q) | 10 | 5 | 5 | 757 | 646 | +111 | 15 | Advance to the second round |
| 4 | Al-Hilal (Q) | 10 | 5 | 5 | 691 | 688 | +3 | 15 | Advance to the second round |
| 5 | Ittihad Al-Marj (E) | 10 | 2 | 8 | 501 | 598 | −97 | 12 | Eliminated |
| 6 | Al-Tahadi (E) | 10 | 0 | 10 | 380 | 857 | −477 | 10 | Eliminated |

Source: Kooora Website
(E) Eliminated; (Q) Qualified for the phase indicated

== Second round ==
The top 4 teams in each group qualified for this round. All teams in the second round will play a double round-robin format. Only the top four teams then proceed to the Final Four.

=== Standings ===
| Pos | Team | Pld | W | L | PF | PA | PD | Pts | Qualification |
|---|---|---|---|---|---|---|---|---|---|
| 1 | Al-Ahly Benghazi | 14 | 13 | 1 | 1128 | 979 | +149 | 27 | Advanced to Final Four |
| 2 | Al-Ahly Tripoli | 14 | 12 | 2 | 1130 | 854 | +276 | 26 | Advanced to Final Four |
| 3 | Al-Nasser | 14 | 10 | 4 | 1078 | 933 | +145 | 24 | Advanced to Final Four |
| 4 | Ittihad | 14 | 9 | 5 | 1060 | 995 | +65 | 23 | Advanced to Final Four |
| 5 | Al-Muroj | 14 | 4 | 10 | 957 | 1042 | −85 | 18 | Eliminated |
| 6 | Al-Hilal | 14 | 4 | 10 | 883 | 1049 | −166 | 18 | Eliminated |
| 7 | Al-Shabab Al-Arabi | 14 | 3 | 11 | 940 | 1086 | −146 | 17 | Eliminated |
| 8 | Al-Madina | 14 | 1 | 13 | 787 | 1025 | −238 | 15 | Eliminated |

Source: Kooora Website

| 29 April 2023 | Al-Ahly Tripoli | 80–68 | Al-Muroj | Tripoli |
| | | | | Arena: Grand Gymnasium |

| 29 April 2023 | Al-Ahly Benghazi | 89–61 | Al-Shabab Al-Arabi | Benghazi |
| | | | | Arena: Suliman Ad-Dharrath Arena |

| 30 April 2023 | Ittihad | vs. | Al-Hilal | Tripoli |
| | | | | Arena: Tripoli Grand Hall |

| 30 April 2023 | Al-Nasser | vs. | Al-Madina | Benghazi |
| | | | | Arena: Suliman Ad-Dharrath Arena |

| 30 April 2023 | Al-Ahly Tripoli | vs. | Al-Hilal | Tripoli |
| | | | | Arena: Tripoli Grand Hall |

| 30 April 2023 | Al-Ahly Benghazi | vs. | Al-Madina | Benghazi |
| | | | | Arena: Suliman Ad-Dharrath Arena |

== Final Four Tournament ==
=== Squads ===
Each team will have a roster of minimum 14 players and maximum 16 players.

Al-Ahly Benghazi

Al Ahly Benghazi roster
Players
Coaches

| Pos. | No. | Nat. | Name | Ht. | Wt. | Age |
|---|---|---|---|---|---|---|
| F | 0 | (Libya) | Al-Zway, Hamado | 1.95 m (6 ft 5 in) | 95 kg (209 lb) | 29 – 29 September 1996 |
| G | 00 | (Palestine) | Dykes, Kyndall | 1.92 m (6 ft 4 in) | 90 kg (198 lb) | 38 – 12 November 1987 |
| SG | 1 | (Libya) | Al-Rashed, Wajdi | 1.87 m (6 ft 2 in) | 83 kg (183 lb) | 32 – 10 October 1993 |
| PG | 3 | (Libya) | Saeed, Mahmud | 1.85 m (6 ft 1 in) | 85 kg (187 lb) | 32 – 15 April 1993 |
| PG | 6 | (Libya) | Mekraz, Zain | 1.83 m (6 ft 0 in) | 85 kg (187 lb) | 34 – 2 October 1991 |
| G | 8 | (Libya) | Zew, Idris | 1.98 m (6 ft 6 in) | 98 kg (216 lb) | 25 – 10 May 2000 |
| F | 9 | (Libya) | Gomange, Sofian | 2.03 m (6 ft 8 in) | 100 kg (220 lb) | 27 – 16 October 1998 |
| C | 10 | (Libya) | El-Shakmak, Yahya | 2.04 m (6 ft 8 in) | 104 kg (229 lb) | 40 – 8 August 1985 |
| C | 12 | (Libya) | Al-Derfily, Omar | 2.05 m (6 ft 9 in) | 104 kg (229 lb) | 28 – 11 December 1997 |
| G/F | 14 | (Libya) | Al-Gohamy, Esmail | 2.03 m (6 ft 8 in) | 102 kg (225 lb) | 26 – 8 September 1999 |
| G | 19 | (Libya) | Abdo, Ibrahim | 1.91 m (6 ft 3 in) | 82 kg (181 lb) | 39 – 10 October 1986 |
| SG | 20 | (Libya) | Al-Sokany, Abdullah | 1.97 m (6 ft 6 in) | 92 kg (203 lb) | 23 – 7 August 2002 |
| C | 21 | (United States) | Anosike, OD | 2.03 m (6 ft 8 in) | 101 kg (223 lb) | 35 – 3 January 1991 |
| F | 23 | (Libya) | Al-Shatiti, Abdulhamid | 1.99 m (6 ft 6 in) | 91 kg (201 lb) | 29 – 6 July 1996 |

Head coach

- (Tunisia) Abdelmoaem Oune

Legend

- (C) Team captain
- (DP) Development player
- (I) Import player
- Injured

- Roster
Updated: 17 July 2023

Al-Ahly Tripoli

Al Ahly Tripoli roster
| Players | Coaches |
|---|---|
| Pos. / No. / Nat. / Name / Ht. / Wt. / Age; C / 00 / (Egypt) / Osama, Anas / 2.13 m (7 ft 0 in) / 97 kg (214 lb) / 30 – 9 May 1995 | Head coach: (Egypt) Ashraf Tawfeek; Legend: (C) Team captain; (DP) Development player; (I) Import player; Injured; Roster; Updated: 17 July 2023 |

Al-Nasser

Al Naser roster
| Players | Coaches |
|---|---|
| Pos. / No. / Nat. / Name / Ht. / Wt. / Age; F / 00 / (Libya) / Tahir, Nouralden / 1.98 m (6 ft 6 in) / 103 kg (227 lb) / 26 – 1 January 2000 | Head coach: (Lebanon) Joe Ghattas; Legend: (C) Team captain; (DP) Development player; (I) Import player; Injured; Roster; Updated: 17 July 2023 |

Ittihad

Ittihad roster
| Players | Coaches |
|---|---|
| Pos. / No. / Nat. / Name / Ht. / Wt. / Age; F / 0 / (Libya) / El-Mabrook, Mohamed / 1.82 m (6 ft 0 in) / 78 kg (172 lb) / 29 – 20 January 1997 | Head coach: (Lebanon) Fouad Abo Shakra; Legend: (C) Team captain; (DP) Development player; (I) Import player; Injured; Roster; Updated: 17 July 2023 |

=== Final standings ===
| Pos | Team | P | W | L | Pts |
|---|---|---|---|---|---|
| 1. | Al-Ahly Benghazi | 6 | 5 | 4 | 11 |
| 2. | Al-Ahly Tripoli | 6 | 4 | 2 | 10 |
| 3. | Al-Nasser | 6 | 3 | 3 | 9 |
| 4. | Ittihad | 6 | 0 | 6 | 6 |

=== Results ===
| Week | Date | Home team | Score | Away team |
|---|---|---|---|---|
Great Hall "Tripoli"
| 1 | July 7, 2023 | Al-Ahly Tripoli | 84-79 | Ittihad |
| 1 | July 7, 2023 | Al-Naser | 72-66 | Al-Ahly Benghazi |
| 2 | July 8, 2023 | Ittihad | 71-74 | Al-Naser |
| 2 | July 8, 2023 | Al-Ahly Tripoli | 75-78 | Al-Ahly Benghazi |
| 3 | July 10, 2023 | Al-Ahly Tripoli | 69-49 | Al-Naser |
| 3 | July 10, 2023 | Al-Ahly Benghazi | 76-74 | Ittihad |
Suliman Darrat Arena "Benghaz"
| 1 | July 15, 2023 | Al-Ahly Benghazi | 81-70 | Al-Naser |
| 1 | July 15, 2023 | Ittihad | 68-82 | Al-Ahly Tripoli |
| 2 | July 16, 2023 | Al-Ahly Benghazi | 67-57 | Al-Ahly Tripoli |
| 2 | July 16, 2023 | Al-Naser | 79-76 | Ittihad |
| 3 | July 18, 2023 | Al-Naser | 72-78 | Al-Ahly Tripoli |
| 3 | July 18, 2023 | Ittihad | 47-50 | Al-Ahly Benghazi |

== Statistics ==
=== Individual statistic leaders ===
| Category | Player | Team(s) | Statistic |
|---|---|---|---|
| Points per game | (Palestine) Kyndall Dykes | Al-Ahly Benghazi | 23.7 |
| Rebounds per game | (Algeria) Mohamed Harat | Ittihad | 15.5 |
| Assists per game | (Egypt) Anas Osama | Al-Ahly Tripoli | 3.8 |
| Assists per game | (Libya) Mohamed Sadi | Al Ahly Tripoli | 3.8 |
| Steals per game | (Libya) Ahmed El-Fallah | Ittihad | 2.2 |
| Steals per game | (Libya) Mohamed Ramdan | Al-Nasser | 2.2 |
| Blocks per game | (Egypt) Anas Osama | Al-Ahly Tripoli | 3.8 |
| Turnovers per game | (Libya) Mohamed Ramdan | Al-Nasser | 5 |
| Fouls per game | (Libya) Abdolusalam Ahmed | Al-Nasser | 4 |
| Fouls per game | (Libya) Yahya Elshakmak | Al-Ahly Benghazi | 4 |
| Fouls per game | (Libya) Ahmed El-Fallah | Ittihad | 4 |
| Minutes per game | (Bosnia and Herzegovina) Elmedin Kikanović | Al-Nasser | 39.3 |

=== Team statistic leaders ===
| Category | Team | Statistic |
|---|---|---|
| Points per game | Al-Ahly Tripoli | 74.2 |
| Rebounds per game | Al-Ahly Benghazi | 42.3 |
| Assists per game | Al-Ahly Tripoli | 17.5 |
| Steals per game | Ittihad | 9.3 |
| Blocks per game | Al-Ahly Tripoli | 4.8 |
| Turnovers per game | Ittihad | 16.2 |
| 2P% | Al-Ahly Tripoli | 46.6% |
| 3P% | Al-Ahly Tripoli | 27.9% |
| FT% | Al-Ahly Benghazi | 58.6% |

=== Awards ===
| Category | Player | Team(s) |
|---|---|---|
| Finals MVP | (Palestine) Kyndall Dykes | Al-Ahly Benghazi |
| Player of the Year | (Libya) Naseem Badroosh | Al-Ahly Tripoli |
| Point Guard of the Year | (Libya) Mohamed El-Sadi | Al-Ahly Tripoli |
| Shooting Guard of the Year | (Libya) Naseem Badroosh | Al-Ahly Tripoli |
| Small Forward of the Year | (Libya) Mohamed Buzgaiya | Al-Nasser |
| Power Forward of the Year | (Libya) Sofian Gomange | Al-Ahly Benghazi |
| Center of the Year | (Libya) Abdelgader Masenga | Ittihad |
| Import Player of the Year | (Palestine) Kyndall Dykes | Al-Ahly Benghazi |
| Rookie Player of the Year | (Libya) Abdulsalam Al-Rashde | Al-Nasser |
| Most Improved Player of the Year | (Libya) Mohsen Elkrmi | Ittihad |
| Defensive Player of the Year | (Libya) Mahmoud Bilhaj | Al-Ahly Tripoli |
| Coach of the Year | (Tunisia) Mounem Oune | Al-Ahly Benghazi |

== See also ==
- Libyan Division I Basketball League
- Libya national basketball team
- Libyan Arab Basketball Federation
