= Curtis Washington =

American basketball player (born 1991)

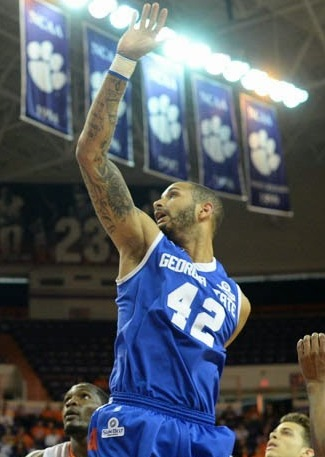
- Washington with Georgia State in 2014

Personal information
- Born: December 5, 1991 (age 34) Chesapeake, Virginia
- Listed height: 6 ft 10 in (2.08 m)
- Listed weight: 230 lb (104 kg)

Career information
- High school: Guam High (Guam); Elizabethtown (Elizabethtown, Kentucky)
- College: USC (2010–2012); Georgia State (2013–2015)
- NBA draft: 2015: undrafted
- Playing career: 2015–present
- Position: Power forward / center

Career history
- 2015: GIE Maile Matrix
- 2015: Instituto Atlético Central Córdoba
- 2015–2016: London Lightning
- 2016: San Carlos
- 2016: Al-Fateh
- 2017: Nelson Giants
- 2017: Taranaki Mountainairs
- 2017: Westports Malaysia Dragons
- 2018: PEA
- 2018: Rockingham Flames
- 2018–2019: Al-Nuwaidrat
- 2019: NLEX Road Warriors

Career highlights
- UBA champion (2015); SBL leader in blocked shots per game (2018)

Curtis Owen Washington (born December 5, 1991) is an American professional basketball player. He played the majority of his college basketball career for the Georgia State Panthers after transferring from USC.

== Early life ==
Washington was born in Chesapeake, Virginia. He lived in Guam from age 12 to 16 while his father was a commander in the Navy and stationed there. After attending Guam High in 9th and 10th Grade, Washington returned to the United States for his final years of high school. As a junior at Elizabethtown High School in Elizabethtown, Kentucky, he averaged 8 points and 4 rebounds per game. Coming into his senior year, he became a McDonald's All-American nominee. As a senior at Elizabethtown, he missed several games due to a right ankle injury, but averaged 8 points and 7.6 rebounds in eight games.

== College career ==
=== Southern California ===
In two years at USC, Washington played a total of three games, all coming in his freshman season. He missed the entire 2011–12 season after having surgery in August 2011 to repair a torn left labrum.

=== Georgia State ===
In May 2012, Washington transferred from USC to Georgia State. He subsequently redshirted the 2012–13 season due to NCAA transfer rules.

==== Junior season (2013–14) ====
In first season at Georgia State, Washington shot a league-leading 65.6 percent from the floor, the second best mark in school history. He blocked 78 shots, the third most in a single-season in program history, which ranked No. 2 in the conference. He also pulled down 5.9 rebounds per game, No. 14 in the Sun Belt, including 4.1 on the defensive end, No. 12 in the league.

In the Panthers' regular season opener, Washington tied a school record with nine blocked shots against Southern Poly, adding seven rebounds and six points in 22 minutes of action. He scored a career-high 17 points with seven rebounds against Elon in the NIT Season Tipoff. He later tied his career high with 17 points on 8-of-10 shooting and eight rebounds against Young Harris. He pulled down a career-high 14 rebounds and had four blocks against FIU. He finished with 11 points and eight rebounds in the Postseason NIT against Clemson in March 2014.

==== Senior season (2014–15) ====
As a senior at Georgia State in 2014–15, Washington earned All-Sun Belt Preseason Third-Team honors. During the season, he averaged 5.2 points and 4.2 rebounds per game, shooting 56.0 percent from the floor and 77.8 percent from the free throw line. He blocked 44 shots, ranked No. 142 in the nation, with a 1.3 bpg average—No. 4 in the Sun Belt and 179th in the country.

Early in the season at the CBE Hall of Fame Classic, Curtis scored 11 points, going 7-of-7 from the free throw line against Chicago State. He pulled down a season-high 10 rebounds with six points and season-high four blocked shots at South Alabama. In the postseason, Washington recorded seven points and five rebounds in the Panthers' come-from-behind NCAA tournament second-round upset over No. 3 Baylor.

=== College records ===
- Tied for Georgia State leader in most blocked shots in a single game (9)

== Professional career ==
Following the conclusion of his senior season at Georgia State, Washington joined GIE Maile Matrix of the Universal Basketball Association (UBA); he helped the team win the 2015 UBA Championship.

In August 2015, Washington signed with Instituto Atlético Central Córdoba of the Argentinian Liga Nacional de Básquet. He appeared in just one game for Instituto before returning to the United States in October 2015.

On October 31, 2015, Washington joined the Maine Red Claws of the NBA Development League for training camp. He made the Red Claws' opening-night roster, but he was deactivated by the team on November 11, 2015, prior to their season opener. Six days later, he was waived by the Red Claws before appearing in a game for them.

In December 2015, Washington joined the London Lightning of the Canadian NBL for the 2015–16 season. The Lightning was surprised by how good Washington was during camp and he was surprised by the calibre of the talent in the NBL. He appeared in eight games for the Lightning before parting ways with the team in late January 2016; he averaged 5.1 points and 2.0 rebounds during his stint.

After a stint with San Carlos of the Dominican Republic, Washington moved to Saudi Arabia in October 2016 and joined Al-Fateh. He left Al-Fateh in December 2016.

On January 18, 2017, Washington signed with the Nelson Giants for the 2017 New Zealand NBL season. Being a Guam international, Washington does not count as an import in New Zealand. He made his debut for the Giants in their season opener on March 16, 2017, scoring 12 points on 5-of-12 shooting to go with four rebounds, one steal and one block in 28 minutes as a starter in a 96–58 loss to the Southland Sharks. On March 30, 2017, he had a 17-point effort in a 100–94 overtime loss to Southland. On April 27, 2017, he was released by the Giants due to inconsistent performance. In 10 games for the Giants, he averaged 9.3 points and 4.2 rebounds per game. The following day, he joined the Taranaki Mountainairs for the rest of the season and made his debut that night, recording six points and six rebounds off the bench in a 97–67 loss to Southland. On May 4, 2017, he recorded 18 points and 11 rebounds off the bench in a 106–83 loss to the Super City Rangers. Three days later, he recorded 15 points and a season-high 13 rebounds in a 90–71 loss to the Canterbury Rams. He ended his stint with Taranaki in late May. In six games for the Mountainairs, he averaged 9.0 points, 7.2 rebounds, 1.0 assists and 1.0 blocks per game.

In November 2017, Washington joined the Westports Malaysia Dragons of the ASEAN Basketball League. He left the team in December after appearing in just two games. He joined PEA of the Thailand Basketball League in January 2018. In 10 games, he averaged 17.6 points, 11.2 rebounds, 2.6 assists and 1.9 blocks per game.

In March 2018, Washington joined the Rockingham Flames of the State Basketball League. In his debut for the Flames on April 20, 2018, Washington recorded 21 points and nine rebounds in a 95–83 win over the East Perth Eagles. On May 25, 2018, he scored 31 points in a 107–86 win over the Willetton Tigers. In 24 games, he averaged 15.8 points, 5.8 rebounds, 1.1 assists and 1.5 blocks per game.

In December 2018, Washington joined Al-Nuwaidrat of the Bahraini Premier League. In 10 games, he averaged 24.6 points, 15.3 rebounds, 1.9 assists and 1.8 blocks per game.

In May 2019, Washington had a one-game stint with the NLEX Road Warriors of the Philippine Basketball Association as a temporary import during the 2019 PBA Commissioner's Cup.

On October 26, 2019, Washington was selected by the Maine Red Claws in the fourth round of NBA G League draft. He was waived by the Red Claws on November 7.

== National team career ==
In July 2016, Washington helped Team Guam defeat the University of the East, from Manila, 76–68 to claim the Guam Invitational Basketball Tournament title at the University of Guam Calvo Field House. Washington led all scorers with 17 points. The following month, he helped Guam win the Oceania 3x3 FIBA championships in Gold Coast, Australia.

In November 2018, Washington played for Guam in the 2021 FIBA Asia Cup pre-qualifiers. In February 2020, he played for Guam in the 2021 FIBA Asia Cup qualifiers. He played in two more qualifying games in June 2021.

== Personal life ==
Washington is the son of Jennifer and James Washington. He lives by what is written on a tattoo on his arm, 'I can do all things through Christ who strengthens me.'
