= Anthony Clemmons =

American basketball player (born 1994)

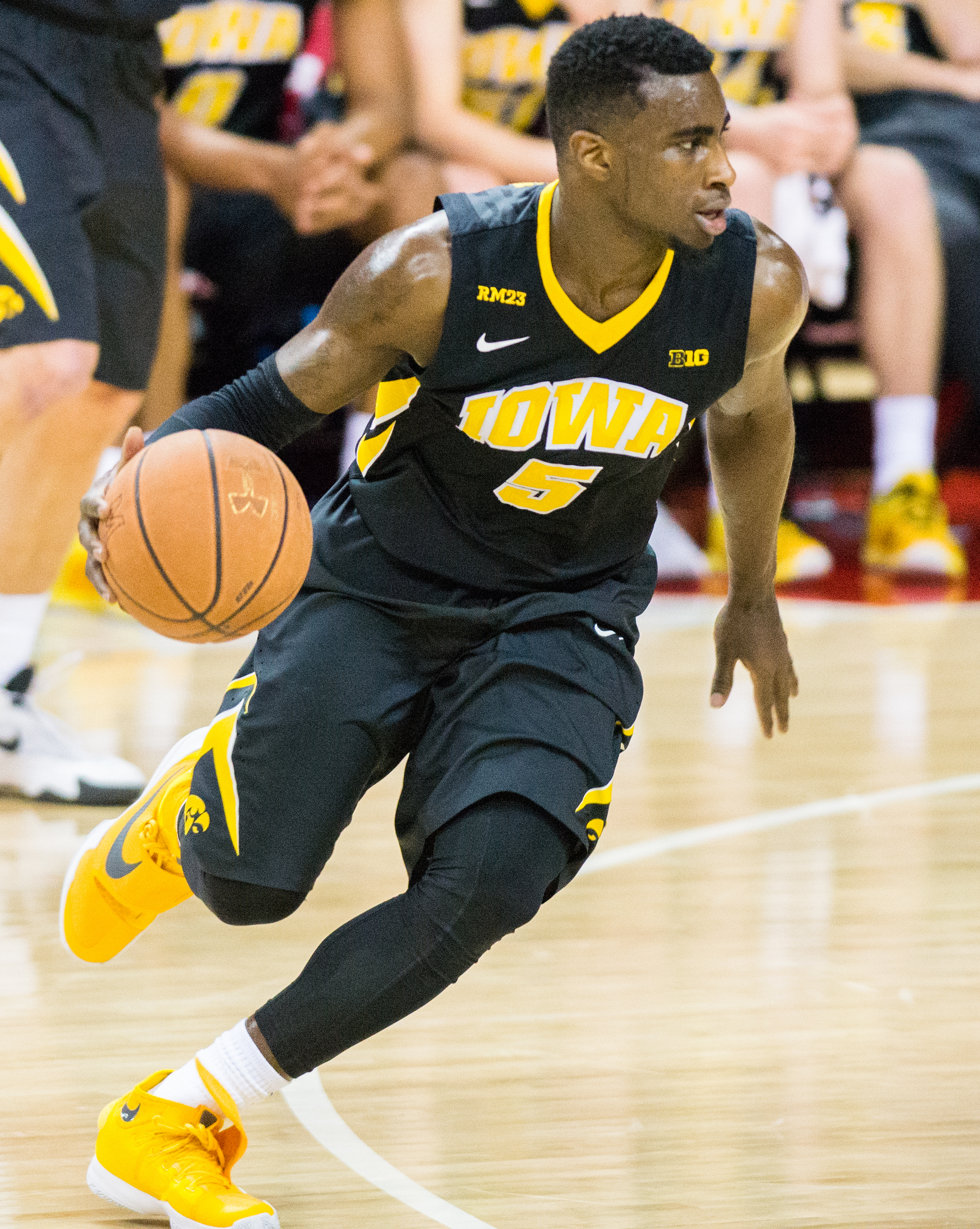

No. 5 – Koshigaya Alphas
- Position: Point guard
- League: B.League

Personal information
- Born: August 15, 1994 (age 32) Lansing, Michigan, U.S.
- Listed height: 1.93 m (6 ft 4 in)
- Listed weight: 87 kg (192 lb)

Career information
- College: Iowa (2012–2016)
- NBA draft: 2016: undrafted
- Playing career: 2016–present

Career history
- 2016–2017: Vienna
- 2017–2019: Astana
- 2019–2020: Monaco
- 2020–2021: Igokea
- 2021: Dinamo Sassari
- 2021–2022: Türk Telekom
- 2022: San Pablo Burgos
- 2022–2023: Frutti Extra Bursaspor
- 2023–2025: Sun Rockers Shibuya
- 2025–present: Koshigaya Alphas

Career highlights
- 2× Kazakhstan League champion (2018, 2019)

Anthony Charles Clemmons (born August 15, 1994) is an American-born naturalized Kazakhstani professional basketball player for Koshigaya Alphas of the Japanese B.League. At 1.93 meters tall, he plays in the position of point guard.

== College career ==
He played four seasons with the Iowa Hawkeyes and averaged 8.9 points and 3.7 assists per game as a senior.

== Professional career ==
After not being chosen in the 2016 NBA draft, in August he signed his first professional contract with the BC Zepter Vienna of Austria with which he would average 17.9 points per game with 4.7 rebounds and 4.5 assists per game .

In June 2017 he signed with BC Astana of Kazakhstan. Clemmons averaged 13.4 points, 5.5 assists and 3.4 rebounds per game in the 2018–19 season.

On July 17, 2019, he signed with Monaco. Clemmons averaged 10.6 points and 2.4 assists per game.

On July 2, 2020, he signed with KK Igokea of the Bosnian league. He averaged 11.2 points, 2.3 rebounds, 4.5 assists, and 1.3 steals per game.

On July 28, 2021, Clemmons signed with Dinamo Sassari of the Lega Basket Serie A. In six games, he averaged 10.2 points, 2.8 rebounds and 2.5 assists per game.

On November 10, Clemmons signed with Türk Telekom of the Turkish Basketball Super League.

On April 21, 2022, he has signed with San Pablo Burgos of the Liga ACB.

On June 15, 2022, he has signed with Frutti Extra Bursaspor of the Turkish Basketbol Süper Ligi (BSL).

On July 2, 2023, he has signed with Sun Rockers Shibuya of the Japanese B.League (BSL).

On May 29, 2025, he signed with the Koshigaya Alphas of the Japanese B.League.
