= Libyan Division I Basketball League =

Basketball league

Libyan Division I Basketball League (LBL)
- Current season, competition or edition: 2024-25 Libyan Division I Basketball League
- Sport: Basketball
- No. of teams: 14
- Country: Libya
- Continent: Africa
- Most recent champion: Al-Ahly Benghazi (4th title) (2024–25)
- Most titles: Ittihad (17 titles)
- Level on pyramid: 1st Tier
- Domestic cup: Libyan Cup
- Related competitions: Libyan Super Cup
- Website: afrobasket.com/Libya

The Libyan Division I Basketball League (LBL) is the highest tier professional basketball league in Libya. It is organized by the Libyan Arab Basketball Federation.

== Teams ==
- Abu Salim SC
- Al Ahly Benghazi
- Al Ahly Tripoli
- Al Eshaa
- Al Hilal
- Al Ittihad Tripoli
- Al Madina Tripoli
- Al Morog
- Al Nasr Benghazi
- Al Shabab
- Belkhair
- Ittihad Al-Marj
- Silphium
- University of Tripoli

== Champions ==
Season	Champion	Finalist
1964-1965	Ittihad
1965-1966	Ittihad
1966-1967	Ittihad
1967-1968	Al-Ahly Tripoli
1968-1969	Al-Ahly Tripoli
1969-1970	Al Madina Tripoli
1970-1971	Al-Ahly Tripoli
1973-1974	Al Madina Tripoli
1974-1975	Al Madina Tripoli
1975-1976	Al Morog
1976-1977	Al Morog
1980-1981	Tripoli Municipal
1982-1983	Al Wehda
1983-1984	Al Hilal
1985-1986	Al-Ahly Tripoli
1986-1987	Al Wehda
1987-1988	Ittihad
1988-1989	Ittihad
1989-1990	Ittihad
1990-1991	Ittihad
1991-1992	Ittihad
1992-1993	Ittihad
1993-1994	Ittihad
1995-1996	Al Morog
1996-1997	Al Madina Tripoli
1997-1998	Al Madina Tripoli
1998-1999	Ittihad
1999-2000	Ittihad
2000-01	Al-Ahly Tripoli
2001–02	Ittihad
2002–03	Ittihad	Al Hilal
2003–04	Ittihad	Al-Nasser
2004–05	Al Morog	Al Shabab
2005–06	Ittihad	Al Shabab
2006–07	Al Nasr Benghazi	Al-Shabab Tripoli
2007–08	Ittihad	Al-Ahly Tripoli
2008–09	Al-Nasser	Ittihad
2009–10	Al-Ahly Benghazi	Al Shabab
2010–11	Al-Ahly Benghazi	Al-Ahly Tripoli
2011–12	N/A	N/A
2012–13	N/A	N/A
2013–14	Al-Ahly Tripoli	Ittihad
2014–15	N/A	N/A
2015–16	N/A	N/A
2016–17	Al-Nasser	Al-Ahly Tripoli
2017–18	Al-Nasser	Al-Ahly Tripoli
2018–19	N/A	N/A
2019–20	N/A	N/A
2020–21	Al-Ahly Tripoli	Ittihad
2021–22	Al-Ahly Tripoli	Al-Nasser
2022-23	Al-Ahly Benghazi	Al-Ahly Tripoli
2023–24	Al-Ahly Tripoli	Al-Ahly Benghazi
2024–25	Al-Ahly Benghazi	Al-Ahly Tripoli

== Performance by club ==
Club	Winners	Runners-up	Years won	Years runner-up
Ittihad	17	3	1964–65, 1965–66, 1966–67, 1987–88, 1988–89, 1989–90, 1990–91, 1991–92, 1992–93, 1993–94, 1998–99, 1999–00, 2001–02, 2002–03, 2003–04, 2005–06, 2007–08	2008–09, 2013–14, 2020–21
Al-Ahly Tripoli	8	6	1967–68, 1968–69, 1970–71, 2000–01, 2013–14, 2020–21, 2021–22, 2023–24	2007–08, 2010–11, 2016–17, 2017–18, 2022–23, 2024–25
Al Madina Tripoli	5	0	1969–70, 1973–74, 1974–75, 1996–97, 1997–98	
Al-Ahly Benghazi	4	1	2009–10, 2010–11, 2022–23, 2024–25	2023–24
Al Morog	4	0	1975–76, 1976–77, 1995–96, 2004–05	
Al-Nasser	3	3	2006–07,2008–09, 2016–17, 2017–18	2003–04, 2006–07, 2021–22
Al Wehda	2	0	1982–83, 1986–87	
Al Hilal	1	1	1983–84	2002–03
Tripoli Municipal	1	0	1980–81	
Al Shabab	0	4		2004–05, 2005–06, 2006–07, 2009–10
