= Al Ahly Ly (basketball) =

Al-Ahly Ly
- Nickname: The Long Journey; The Butchers
- Leagues: Libyan Basketball League; BAL
- Founded: 1950 (parent club: 1947)
- History: Al Ahly Benghazi (1950–present)
- Arena: Suliman Darrat Arena
- Location: Benghazi, Libya
- Team colors: Black, White
- Chairman: Khaled Mohamed
- Head coach: Joe Ghattas
- Championships: 4 (2010, 2011, 2023, 2025)
- Website: alahly.com.ly
Home	Away

Al-Ahly Sports Cultural & Social Club (Arabic: الأهلي), also known as Al-Ahly Ly or Al-Ahly Benghazi, is a Libyan basketball club that is based in Benghazi. Founded in 1950, the club competes in the Libyan Division I Basketball League and has won four championships, in 2010, 2011, 2023 and 2025.

In the 2024 season, they debuted in the Basketball Africa League (BAL), becoming the first team from Libya to play in the competition. Al Ahly has won the Arab Club Championship in 2012 and 2013. Al Ahly Ly were the runners-up of the 2024 BAL season.

== History ==
Al-Ahly is the basketball section of the multi-sports club; the basketball section was founded in 1950, although the club had been active before. They finished third in the 2008–09 Libyan League season. The club won their first national championship in 2010, and won a second consecutive one in 2011.

In 2012, Al Ahly won the Arab Club Basketball Championship, by defeating JS Kairouan of the Tunisia in the final. They repeated for a second consecutive title in 2013. Both tournaments were hosted in Benghazi.

=== BAL finalists (2023–2024) ===
Al Ahly ended a 12-year drought in 2022-23, when the club won its third national championship. As such, Al-Ahly was eligible to represent Libya in the Road to BAL 2024 tournament. They acquired high-profile players such as ex-BAL Defensive Player of the Year Ater Majok, All-BAL First Team selection Chris Crawford and two-time BAL champion Solo Diabate. On 5 November 2023, Al Ahly clinched their berth in the 2024 BAL season, following their 93–84 win over FAP in the third place game. Crawford scored 39 points in the decisive game. As such, Al Ahly Benghazi became the first team from Libya to qualify for the BAL main tournament.

The team acquired import players Jo Lual-Acuil, Majok Deng, Kevin Murphy and Pierre Jackson for the main BAL season. After finishing second in the Nile Conference, they entered the playoffs as the seventh seed but were able to eliminate the defending champions Al Ahly from Egypt. In the semifinal, the Rivers Hoopers from Nigeria were eliminated after overtime. In the decisive final, Al Ahly lost to Petro de Luanda to finish in second place. Al Ahly Ly's Jo Lual-Acuil was named the BAL Most Valuable Player of the season.

After losing the finals to Al Ahli Tripoli, Al Ahly only played domestically in 2024–25, but went on to win its fourth national title.

== Honours ==
=== Domestic ===
Libyan Basketball League

- Winners (4): 2009–10, 2010–11, 2022–23, 2024–25

Libyan Cup

- Winners (2): 2009–10, 2022–23

Libyan Supercup

- Winners (3): 2010, 2023, 2024

=== International ===
Basketball Africa League (BAL)

- Runners-up (1): 2024

Arab Club Basketball Championship

- Champions (2): 2012, 2013

== In African competitions ==
FIBA Africa Clubs Champions Cup (3 appearances)

2010 – Group Stage
2011 – Group Stage
2013 – 8th Place

Basketball Africa League (1 appearance)

2024 – Silver

Road to BAL (1 appearance)

2024 – Place

== Players ==
=== Current roster ===
Note: Flags indicate national team eligibility at FIBA-sanctioned events. Players may hold other non-FIBA nationalities not displayed.

Al Ahly Ly roster
Players
Coaches

Pos.	No.	Nat.	Name	Ht.	Age
G	1	(United States)	Golden, Trae	1.91 m (6 ft 3 in)	34 – 5 October 1991
C	3	(South Sudan)	Majok, Ater	2.10 m (6 ft 11 in)	38 – 4 July 1987
SG	6	(United States)	Crawford, Chris	1.94 m (6 ft 4 in)	33 – 30 September 1992
F	8	(Libya)	Zeew, Adrees	1.98 m (6 ft 6 in)	26 – 10 May 2000
PF	9	(Libya)	Hamad, Sofian	2.01 m (6 ft 7 in)	27 – 16 October 1998
PG	10	(Ivory Coast)	Diabate, Solo	1.83 m (6 ft 0 in)	38 – 21 July 1987
C	12	(Libya)	Aldirfili, Omar	2.05 m (6 ft 9 in)	29 – 2 March 1997
C	13	(Libya)	Elmansouri, Anis Zaid Ali	2.05 m (6 ft 9 in)	31 – 4 January 1995
SG	14	(Libya)	Aljahmi, Asmaeil	2.03 m (6 ft 8 in)	26 – 28 September 1999
PG	19	(Libya)	Alrashidi, Rasheed	1.78 m (5 ft 10 in)	22 – 1 December 2003
PF	23	(Libya)	Almaghribi, Ghayth Alrahman	2.04 m (6 ft 8 in)	27 – 25 January 1999
PG	30	(Libya)	Benalhaj, Mahmoud Abdalla	1.89 m (6 ft 2 in)	35 – 25 January 1991

Head coach

- (Lebanon) Joe Ghattas

Legend

- (C) Team captain
- Injured

- Roster
Updated: 2 November 2023

== Head coaches ==
The following people have been, among others, head coach of Al Ahly Benghazi:

- (Libya) Emad El-Din: (1985–1986)
- (Egypt) Mahmoud Emad: (2009–2011)
- (Serbia) Veselin Matić: (2012–2014)
- (Serbia) Radenco Orlovic: (2017–2018)
- (Serbia) Zoran Cvetanović: (2021–2022)
- (Algeria) Mohamed Yahaya: (2022)
- (Tunisia) Aouen Monaem (2022–2024)
- (Lebanon) Joe Ghattas: (2024–)
