= South Korea men's national basketball team =

Men's national basketball team representing South Korea

South Korea
- FIBA ranking: 57 (1 September 2026)
- Joined FIBA: 1947
- FIBA zone: FIBA Asia
- National federation: KBA
- Coach: Nikolajs Mazurs

Olympic Games
- Appearances: 6

FIBA World Cup
- Appearances: 8

FIBA Asia Cup
- Appearances: 31
- Medals: (gold) Gold: (1969, 1997); (silver) Silver: (1967, 1973, 1977, 1981, 1985, 1987, 1989, 1991, 1995, 1999, 2003); (bronze) Bronze: (1963, 1965, 1971, 1975, 1979, 1983, 1993, 2001, 2007, 2011, 2013, 2017)

Asian Games
- Appearances: 19
- Medals: (gold) Gold: (1970, 1982, 2002, 2014, 2026); (silver) Silver: (1974, 1978, 1986, 1994, 1998, 2010); (bronze) Bronze: (1962, 1966, 1990, 2018)
Home	Away

First international
- Belgium 27–29 South Korea (London, England; 30 July 1948)

Biggest win
- Sri Lanka 36–163 South Korea (Bangkok, Thailand; 20 November 1975)

Biggest defeat
- United States 146–67 South Korea (Villa Ballester, Argentina; 8 August 1990)
Medal record
FIBA Asia Cup
Gold medal – first place	1969 Thailand
Gold medal – first place	1997 Saudi Arabia
Silver medal – second place	1967 South Korea
Silver medal – second place	1973 Philippines
Silver medal – second place	1977 Malaysia
Silver medal – second place	1981 India
Silver medal – second place	1985 Malaysia
Silver medal – second place	1987 Thailand
Silver medal – second place	1989 China
Silver medal – second place	1991 Japan
Silver medal – second place	1995 South Korea
Silver medal – second place	1999 Japan
Silver medal – second place	2003 China
Bronze medal – third place	1963 Taiwan
Bronze medal – third place	1965 Malaysia
Bronze medal – third place	1971 Japan
Bronze medal – third place	1975 Thailand
Bronze medal – third place	1979 Japan
Bronze medal – third place	1983 Hong Kong
Bronze medal – third place	1993 Indonesia
Bronze medal – third place	2001 China
Bronze medal – third place	2007 Japan
Bronze medal – third place	2011 China
Bronze medal – third place	2013 Philippines
Bronze medal – third place	2017 Lebanon
Asian Games
Gold medal – first place	1970 Bangkok	Team
Gold medal – first place	1982 New Delhi	Team
Gold medal – first place	2002 Busan	Team
Gold medal – first place	2014 Incheon	Team
Silver medal – second place	1974 Tehran	Team
Silver medal – second place	1978 Bangkok	Team
Silver medal – second place	1986 Seoul	Team
Silver medal – second place	1994 Hiroshima	Team
Silver medal – second place	1998 Bangkok	Team
Silver medal – second place	2010 Guangzhou	Team
Bronze medal – third place	1962 Jakarta	Team
Bronze medal – third place	1966 Bangkok	Team
Bronze medal – third place	1990 Beijing	Team
Bronze medal – third place	2018 Jakarta	Team

The Republic of Korea men's national basketball team (Korean: 대한민국 농구 국가대표팀; recognized as Korea by FIBA) represents South Korea in international basketball competitions. They are administered by the Korea Basketball Association.

Based on the number of overall medals won, South Korea is a major force among the national teams of FIBA Asia. At the FIBA Asia Cup, they have won a record 25 medals in the competition. Furthermore, South Korea is the only nation that has qualified for every edition of the event since it was first held in 1960. While on the global level, South Korea has qualified for the FIBA World Cup eight times throughout their history.

== History ==
=== Initiation (1947–1951) ===
In 1947, the Joseon Basketball Association (Korean: 조선농구협회; Hanja: 朝鮮籠球協會) joined the International Basketball Federation (FIBA), becoming the governing body responsible for representing basketball in Korea in international competitions. In 1948, a team representing the Korean Peninsula, selected by the association, made its debut in the Olympic basketball tournament at the London Games, finishing in eighth place. It was the highest-ranked Asian team in the tournament, ahead of Canada, the Philippines, Argentina and Italy. The team was officially listed by FIBA as "Korea"; at the time, however, the delegation and the basketball team used the name *Joseon* (조선, literally "Korea"), as reflected in the contemporary designation *Joseon Olympic Delegation* (Korean: 조선올림픽대표단; Hanja: 朝鮮올림픽代表團). This referred to Korea as a whole, rather than to either of the two states that would subsequently be established.

At the time of the 1948 London Olympics, the Korean Peninsula was under separate administration in the north and south, although neither the Republic of Korea nor the Democratic People's Republic of Korea had yet been formally established. The Korean Olympic Committee had been recognized by the International Olympic Committee in 1947 and represented the Korean Peninsula at the Games. The Republic of Korea was established on 15 August 1948, and the Joseon Basketball Association was renamed the Korea Basketball Association (Korean: 대한농구협회; Hanja: 大韓籠球協會) on 3 September. South Korean basketball and Olympic histories subsequently incorporated the 1948 team's participation into their national sporting record. The Democratic People's Republic of Korea, meanwhile, did not make its Olympic debut until the 1972 Summer Olympics in Munich.

=== Steady improvements (1952–1968) ===
At the 1954 Asian Games, for the first time ever, South Korea finished in the Final Four of a major international basketball tournament in Asia. The team slowly improved its position within Asia almost every year and qualified for the Basketball World Cup several times.

=== Golden years (1969–1970) ===
In 1969 and 1970, the team enjoyed a brief period to shine, when it won the 1969 Asian Championship and the 1970 Asian Games and ultimately qualified for the 1970 FIBA World Championship. As the only Asian team that had remained in the championship, South Korea finished ahead of Australia (champion of FIBA Oceania) and Egypt (champion of FIBA Africa) and showed its best performance ever at this event. Korea's Shin Dong-Pa dominated all scorers at the 1970 FIBA World Cup as he averaged 32.6 points per game, almost 13 points more than the runner up, Davis Peralta, from Panama.

=== Asian elite position behind China (1971–2007) ===
At the Asian Championship, South Korea stayed among the top three teams at 21 straight events, a record that is still unmatched until today.

At the 1996 Olympics, Hyun Joo-Yup averaged 16.6 points through the entire tournament.

At the 2005 FIBA Asia Championship, South Korea's medal-winning streak finally ended when they lost to Qatar at the 3rd place game. Between 1975 and 2005, South Korea was the only nation besides the Philippines that was able to seriously challenge China's dominance. It interrupted China's championship winning streak in 1997, when it defeated its dominant neighbor in the semifinals and ultimately won the crown as 1997 Champion of Asia.

At the 2007 FIBA Asia Championship, South Korea was able to go on a streak, and won the first 5 games. Because of the "four centers" Ha Seung-jin (221 cm), Kim Joo-sung (205 cm), Lee Dong-jun (202 cm), and Kim Min-soo (200 cm), South Korea had the tournament's highest 2-point field goal percentage (61%). South Korea was also a team that had a strong back court with Kim Seung-hyun (179 cm), Yang Dong-geun (182 cm), Kim Dong-woo (198 cm), and Choi Jin-soo (205 cm), who guaranteed that the team was in the tournaments top-3 in free throw percentage (70.6) and assists per game (11.5). All these players helped their team to win the bronze medal once again.

=== Emergence of West Asian competition (2008–2018) ===
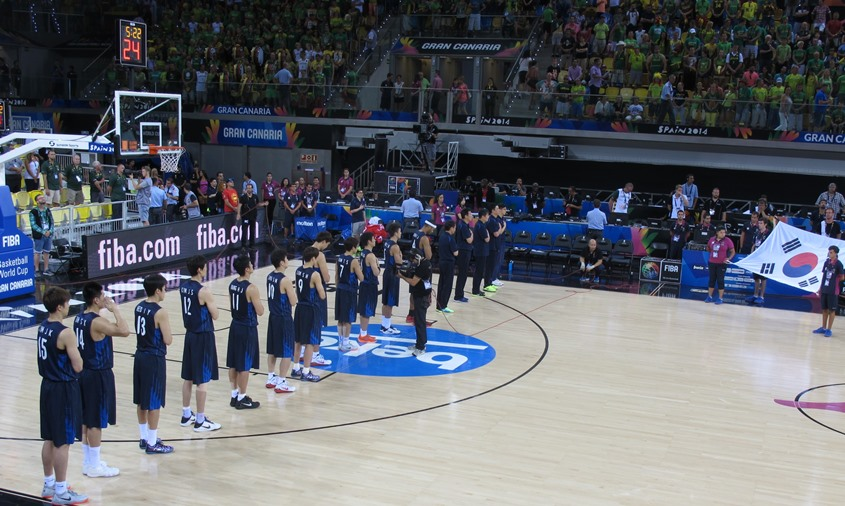
South Korea at the 2014 FIBA World Cup.

In the modern era, South Korea's competition from West Asia intensified as countries such as Jordan, Qatar, Lebanon, and especially Iran improved their basketball programs. South Korea is still considered one of Asia's major teams but its position among the top three teams in Asia is not guaranteed anymore. In 2014, the team qualified for the Basketball World Cup for the first time in almost 20 years. Even though the team was eliminated in the first round, the qualification itself was a success and provided much needed global exposure. Most of the players that played at the 2014 World Cup returned for the 2014 Asian Games where they helped secure the gold medal on home soil.

Former Jeonju KCC Egis manager Hur Jae took over as the national team coach in 2016. They reached the play-offs of the 2017 FIBA Asia Cup and won the bronze medal. At the 2018 Asian Games, South Korea was unable to defend their tournament gold medal due to the loss of key players to injuries. The public outcry, coupled by accusations that Hur had shown favoritism by selecting both his sons into the national team, prompted Hur to resign in September. Hur's former assistant Kim Sang-shik took over as the new coach.

=== 2019 FIBA World Cup and generational change (2019–present) ===
Under Kim Sang-shik, the South Korean team secured their place at the 2019 FIBA Basketball World Cup. Kim also began introducing younger players into the squad on a more regular basis. However, Kim decided on a more experienced squad, with half the players selected aged 30 and above and Heo Hoon being the youngest player at 24. South Korea struggled with injury problems to key players during the tournament but ended their losing streak at the World Cup. They recorded their first win at the World Cup in 25 years by winning their last game of the tournament, an 80–71 win over the Ivory Coast.

More signs of a "generational change" were visible as Kim called-up a squad composed only of players born in the 1990's for a 2022 FIBA Asia Cup qualifier against Indonesia. However, the COVID-19 pandemic disrupted much of 2020 as the closing of international borders and government-mandated quarantine regulations discouraged KBL teams from releasing valuable players to the national team, prompting a conflict between the Korean Basketball League (KBL) and the Korean Basketball Association (KBA). Kim resigned in late January 2021, citing his frustration over being caught in between the KBL and KBA and the failure of all parties to come to a resolution. Cho Sang-hyun took over in September 2021 and is expected to remain in charge until the 2023 FIBA Basketball World Cup.

In preparation of South Korea's participation in the 2023 FIBA Basketball World Cup Asian qualifiers, a two-week break from the regular season was scheduled in February 2022 for the national team call-ups. The Korean Basketball League was hit by the coronavirus as early as December 2021, with Changwon LG Sakers reporting their first case within the team. At the end of January 2022, KBL even made their first-ever match postponement due to the coronavirus, as multiple positive cases were reported in Seoul Samsung Thunders. Although stringent testing requirements and quarantine rules were implemented by KBL, it failed to lower the number of infections in the league. In February 2022, a massive outbreak occurred as many teams reported positive cases among their players and staff within a span of two weeks. Some teams could not field their main players as they were infected. Even so, KBL carried on with the scheduled matches as long as the participating teams could fill up the roster. Some players eventually took to social media to express their frustration publicly over the forced commencement of the league and lack of concern towards the wellbeing of the players. On the next day, KBL announced a suspension of the season for two weeks by postponing all remaining matches scheduled in February to a later date. The national basketball team took a major hit as most of the players on the preliminary roster submitted to FIBA at an earlier date, were infected by the coronavirus. Despite Cho's efforts of putting together a new roster, a player from the renewed roster was tested positive right before they depart to the Philippines on 22 February. As a result, South Korea pulled out of the 2023 FIBA Basketball World Cup Asian qualifiers and was eventually disqualified. South Korea did try to appeal that decision, but it was rejected by FIBA. Hence, South Korea's appearance in the 2023 FIBA World Cup and the 2024 Summer Olympics is unclear as of now.

On 29 April 2022, Cho was announced as the new head coach of Changwon LG Sakers, and terminated his contract as the national team's head coach. After an open recruitment of a new head coach by the Korean Basketball Association, Choo Il-seung, previously a head coach for Goyang Orion Orions was chosen to lead the men's national basketball team effective 19 May 2022.

== Competitive record ==
=== Olympic Games ===
Summer Olympics
Year	Rank	Pld	W	L
(Germany) 1936	Did not enter			
(United Kingdom) 1948	8th place	8	3	5
(Finland) 1952	Did not qualify			
(Australia) 1956	14th place	7	1	6
(Italy) 1960	Did not qualify			
(Japan) 1964	16th place	9	0	9
(Mexico) 1968	14th place	9	2	7
(Germany) 1972	Did not qualify			
(Canada) 1976	Did not qualify			
(Soviet Union) 1980	Did not qualify			
(United States) 1984	Did not qualify			
(South Korea) 1988	9th place	7	2	5
(Spain) 1992	Did not qualify			
(United States) 1996	12th place	7	0	7
(Australia) 2000	Did not qualify			
(Greece) 2004	Did not qualify			
(China) 2008	Did not qualify			
(United Kingdom) 2012	Did not qualify			
(Brazil) 2016	Did not qualify			
(Japan) 2020	Did not qualify			
(France) 2024	Withdrew			
Total	6/20	47	8	39

=== FIBA World Cup ===
FIBA World Cup
Year	Position	Pld	W	L
(Argentina) 1950	Withdrew			
(Brazil) 1954	Did not qualify			
(Chile) 1959	Did not qualify			
(Brazil) 1963	Did not qualify			
(Uruguay) 1967	Did not qualify			
(Socialist Federal Republic of Yugoslavia) 1970	11th place	8	4	4
(Puerto Rico) 1974	Did not qualify			
(Philippines) 1978	13th place	7	1	6
(Colombia) 1982	Did not qualify			
(Spain) 1986	22nd place	5	0	5
(Argentina) 1990	15th place	8	1	7
(Canada) 1994	13th place	8	3	5
(Greece) 1998	16th place	5	0	5
(United States) 2002	Did not qualify			
(Japan) 2006	Did not qualify			
(Turkey) 2010	Did not qualify			
(Spain) 2014	23rd place	5	0	5
(China) 2019	26th place	5	1	4
(Philippines) (Japan) (Indonesia) 2023	Withdrew			
(Qatar) 2027	To be determined			
(France) 2031	To be determined			
Total	8/20	51	10	41

=== Asian Games ===
Asian Games
Year	Position	Pld	W	L
(India) 1951	Did not enter			
(Philippines) 1954	Fourth place	6	2	4
(Japan) 1958	Fourth place	8	4	4
(Indonesia) 1962	Third place	8	6	2
(Thailand) 1966	Third place	7	6	1
(Thailand) 1970	Champions	8	7	1
(Iran) 1974	Runners-up	7	4	3
(Thailand) 1978	Runners-up	9	8	1
(India) 1982	Champions	9	9	0
(South Korea) 1986	Runners-up	7	6	1
(China) 1990	Third place	7	5	2
(Japan) 1994	Runners-up	6	5	1
(Thailand) 1998	Runners-up	7	6	1
(South Korea) 2002	Champions	7	7	0
(Qatar) 2006	5th place	8	5	3
(China) 2010	Runners-up	8	6	2
(South Korea) 2014	Champions	7	7	0
(Indonesia) 2018	Third place	6	5	1
(China) 2022	7th place	7	4	3
(Japan) 2026	th place	6	4	0
Total	19/20	138	106	30

=== FIBA Asia Cup ===
FIBA Asia Cup
Year	Position	Pld	W	L
(Philippines) 1960	4th place	9	3	6
(Taiwan) 1963	3rd place	10	7	3
(Malaysia) 1965	3rd place	9	6	3
(South Korea) 1967	Runners-up	9	8	1
(Thailand) 1969	Champions	8	8	0
(Japan) 1971	3rd place	8	6	2
(Philippines) 1973	Runners-up	10	9	1
(Thailand) 1975	3rd place	8	6	2
(Malaysia) 1977	Runners-up	8	7	1
(Japan) 1979	3rd place	7	5	2
(India) 1981	Runners-up	7	6	1
(Hong Kong) 1983	3rd place	7	5	2
(Malaysia) 1985	Runners-up	6	5	1
(Thailand) 1987	Runners-up	8	7	1
(China) 1989	Runners-up	8	7	1
(Japan) 1991	Runners-up	9	8	1
(Indonesia) 1993	3rd place	6	5	1
(South Korea) 1995	Runners-up	8	6	2
(Saudi Arabia) 1997	Champions	8	7	1
(Japan) 1999	Runners-up	8	6	2
(China) 2001	3rd place	8	7	1
(China) 2003	Runners-up	8	7	1
(Qatar) 2005	4th place	8	5	3
(Japan) 2007	3rd place	8	6	2
(China) 2009	7th place	9	6	3
(China) 2011	3rd place	9	7	2
(Philippines) 2013	3rd place	9	7	2
(China) 2015	6th place	9	5	4
(Lebanon) 2017	3rd place	7	5	2
(Indonesia) 2022	6th place	4	3	1
(Saudi Arabia) 2025	6th place	5	3	2
Total	31/31	245	188	57

=== East Asian Games ===
East Asian Games
Year	Position	Pld	W	L
(China) 1993	Runners-up	-	-	-
(South Korea) 1997	Runners-up	-	-	-
(Japan) 2001	Runners-up	-	-	-
(Macau) 2005	Runners-up	-	-	-
(Hong Kong) 2009	Champions	-	-	-
(China) 2013	Third place	-	-	-
Total	6/6	-	-	-

=== East Asia Basketball Championship ===
EABA Championship
Year	Position	Pld	W	L
(Japan) 2009	Champions	4	4	0
(China) 2011	Champions	4	3	1
(South Korea) 2013	Champions	5	5	0
(Japan) 2017	Runners-up	4	2	2
Total	4/4	17	14	3

=== FIBA Asia Challenge ===
FIBA Asia Challenge
Year	Position	Pld	W	L
(Taiwan) 2004	Runners-up	5	3	2
(Kuwait) 2008	Did not enter			
(Lebanon) 2010	Did not enter			
(Japan) 2012	Did not enter			
(China) 2014	Did not enter			
(Iran) 2016	Runners-up	8	6	2
Total	2/6	13	9	4

=== William Jones Cup ===
William Jones Cup
Year	Position	Pld	W	L
(Taiwan) 1977				
(Taiwan) 1978	Runners-up			
(Taiwan) 1979	Not held			
(Taiwan) 1980				
(Taiwan) 1981				
(Taiwan) 1982	5th place			
(Taiwan) 1983				
(Taiwan) 1984				
(Taiwan) 1985	6th place			
(Taiwan) 1986	Runners-up			
(Taiwan) 1987				
(Taiwan) 1988	Third place			
(Taiwan) 1989	Not held			
(Taiwan) 1990				
(Taiwan) 1991	Third place			
(Taiwan) 1992				
(Taiwan) 1993				
(Taiwan) 1994				
(Taiwan) 1995				
(Taiwan) 1996				
(Taiwan) 1997				
(Taiwan) 1998	Third place			
(Taiwan) 1999	Champions			
(Taiwan) 2000	Runners-up	6	5	1
(Taiwan) 2001	Runners-up	7	6	1
(Taiwan) 2002				
(Taiwan) 2003	Not held			
(Taiwan) 2004				
(Taiwan) 2005				
(Taiwan) 2006				
(Taiwan) 2007				
(Taiwan) 2008	7th place	9	2	7
(Taiwan) 2009	5th place	8	5	3
(Taiwan) 2010	Did not enter			
(Taiwan) 2011	Runners-up	9	7	2
(Taiwan) 2012	5th place	8	5	3
(Taiwan) 2013	Third place	7	5	2
(Taiwan) 2014	Did not enter			
(Taiwan) 2015	5th place	8	4	4
(Taiwan) 2016	Runners-up	8	6	2
(Taiwan) 2017	Third place	9	6	3
(Taiwan) 2018	Third place	8	6	2
(Taiwan) 2019	Runners-up	8	7	1
Total	?/37	?	?	?

== Team ==
=== Current roster ===
Roster for the 2027 FIBA Basketball World Cup qualification against Chinese Taipei on 26 February and Japan on 1 March 2026.

South Korea men's national basketball team – 2027 FIBA Basketball World Cup qualification (Asia) roster
Players
Coaches

Pos.	No.	Name	Age – Date of birth	Height	Club	Ctr.
G		Yu Ki-sang	24 – 17 April 2001	1.88 m (6 ft 2 in)	Changwon LG Sakers	(South Korea)
G		Lee Jung-hyun	26 – 14 April 1999	1.87 m (6 ft 2 in)	Goyang Sono Skygunners	(South Korea)
G		Moon Yu-hyeon	21 – 8 June 2004	1.80 m (5 ft 11 in)	Anyang JKJ Red Boosters	(South Korea)
G		Yang Jun-seok	24 – 7 December 2001	1.80 m (5 ft 11 in)	Changwon LG Sakers	(South Korea)
F		Lee Hyun-jung	25 – 23 October 2000	2.02 m (6 ft 8 in)	Nagasaki Velca	(Japan)
F		Shin Seung-min	27 – 25 March 1998	1.95 m (6 ft 5 in)	Daegu KOGAS Pegasus	(South Korea)
F		An Young-jun	30 – 28 June 1995	1.94 m (6 ft 4 in)	Seoul SK Knights	(South Korea)
PF		Daniel Edi	18 – 3 April 2007	1.91 m (6 ft 3 in)	Seoul SK Knights	(South Korea)
PF		Kim Bo-bae	22 – 23 June 2003	2.02 m (6 ft 8 in)	Wonju DB Promy	(South Korea)
C		Lee Doo-won	25 – 20 August 2000	2.04 m (6 ft 8 in)	Suwon KT Sonicboom	(South Korea)
C		Kang Ji-hoon	22 – 22 July 2003	2.01 m (6 ft 7 in)	Goyang Sono Skygunners	(South Korea)
C		Lee Seoung-hyun	33 – 16 April 1992	1.97 m (6 ft 6 in)	Ulsan Hyundai Mobis Phoebus	(South Korea)

Head coach

- (Latvia) Nikolajs Mazurs

Assistant coach(es)

- (South Korea) Seo Dong-chul

Legend

- (C) Team captain
- Club – describes last
  club before the tournament
- Age – describes age
  on 21 February 2026

=== Past rosters ===
South Korea men's national basketball team – 2025 FIBA Asia Cup roster
Players
Coaches

Pos.	No.	Name	Age – Date of birth	Height	Club	Ctr.
C	0	Ha Yun-gi	26 – 12 March 1999	2.03 m (6 ft 8 in)	Suwon KT Sonicboom	(South Korea)
F	1	Lee Hyun-jung	24 – 23 October 2000	2.00 m (6 ft 7 in)	Nagasaki Velca	(Japan)
G	3	Jeong Seong-woo	31 – 17 August 1993	1.78 m (5 ft 10 in)	Daegu KOGAS Pegasus	(South Korea)
G	5	Yang Jun-seok	23 – 7 December 2001	1.80 m (5 ft 11 in)	Changwon LG Sakers	(South Korea)
G	6	Park Ji-hoon	30 – 21 January 1995	1.82 m (6 ft 0 in)	Anyang JKJ Red Boosters	(South Korea)
G	7	Yu Ki-sang	24 – 17 April 2001	1.88 m (6 ft 2 in)	Changwon LG Sakers	(South Korea)
G	9	Lee Jung-hyun	26 – 14 April 1999	1.90 m (6 ft 3 in)	Goyang Sono Skygunners	(South Korea)
F	11	Lee Woo-suk	26 – 10 July 1999	1.96 m (6 ft 5 in)	Sangmu	(South Korea)
F	12	Moon Jeong-hyeon	24 – 30 July 2001	1.95 m (6 ft 5 in)	Suwon KT Sonicboom	(South Korea)
C	15	Kim Jong-kyu (C)	34 – 3 July 1991	2.07 m (6 ft 9 in)	Anyang JKJ Red Boosters	(South Korea)
PF	22	Yeo Jun-seok	23 – 19 March 2002	2.02 m (6 ft 8 in)	Seattle Redhawks	(United States)
C	33	Lee Seoung-hyun	33 – 16 April 1992	1.97 m (6 ft 6 in)	Ulsan Hyundai Mobis Phoebus	(South Korea)

Head coach

- (South Korea) Ahn Joon-ho

Assistant coach(es)

- (South Korea) Seo Dong-chul

Legend

- (C) Team captain
- Club – describes last
  club before the tournament
- Age – describes age
  on 4 December 2025

=== Head coaches ===
- (South Korea) Jung Sang-yun (1948)
- (South Korea) Kim Young-ki (1970)
- (South Korea) Bang Yeol (1982–1983)
- (South Korea) Choi Bu-young (2006–2007)
- (South Korea) Hur Jae (2008–2009)
- (South Korea) Yoo Jae-hak (2010–2014)
- (South Korea) Kim Dong-gwang (2015)
- (South Korea) Hur Jae (2016–2018)
- (South Korea) Kim Sang-sik (2018–2021)
- (South Korea) Cho Sang-hyun (2021–2022)
- (South Korea) Choo Il-seung (2022–2023)
- (South Korea) Ahn Joon-ho (2023–2025)
- (Latvia) Nikolajs Mazurs (2025-)

== Kit ==
=== Manufacturer ===
- 2002–2023: Nike
- 2023–present: Pro-Specs

=== Sponsor ===
- 2016–2017: Hana Financial Group
- 2018–2025: KB Kookmin Bank
- 2025–present: Hana Bank

== See also ==
- Sport in South Korea
- South Korea national under-19 basketball team
- South Korea national under-17 basketball team
- South Korea women's national basketball team
