= 2008 William Jones Cup =

Basketball tournament

Tournament information
- Location: Taipei
- Dates: M: 10–19 July; W: 20–24 July
- Host: Taiwan
- Teams: M: 9 W: 4

Final positions
- Champions: M: Iran; W: South Korea
- 1st runners-up: M: Jordan; W: Japan
- 2nd runners-up: M: Lebanon; W: Chinese Taipei

The 2008 William Jones Cup was the 30th tournament of the William Jones Cup that took place in Taipei from 10 July – 24 July.

== Men's tournament ==
=== Preliminary round ===
Team	Pld	W	L	PF	PA	PD	Pts	Tiebreaker
(United States) Athletes in Action	7	6	1				13	
Jordan	7	5	2				12	
Australia U-19	7	4	3				11	2-0
Qatar	7	4	3				11	1-1
Egypt	7	4	3				11	0–2
Kazakhstan	7	3	4				7	
Chinese Taipei	7	1	6				8	1-0
South Korea	7	1	6				8	0-1

July 10

Chinese Taipei	72–68	South Korea

Taipei

July 10

Kazakhstan	74–71	Australia U-19

Taipei

July 10

Qatar	82–80	Egypt

Taipei

July 10

Jordan	67–63	(United States) Athletes in Action

Taipei

July 11

Kazakhstan	87–71	South Korea

Taipei

July 11

(United States) Athletes in Action	81–67	Qatar

Taipei

July 11

Egypt	80–63	Jordan

Taipei

July 11

Australia U-19	80–67	Chinese Taipei

Taipei

July 12

Egypt	99–96	South Korea

Taipei

July 12

Jordan	61–39	Kazakhstan

Taipei

July 12

(United States) Athletes in Action	98–67	Australia U-19

Taipei

July 12

Qatar	84–80	Chinese Taipei

Taipei

July 13

(United States) Athletes in Action	103–65	South Korea

Taipei

July 13

Australia U-19	75–68	Egypt

Taipei

July 13

Qatar	78–69	Kazakhstan

Taipei

July 13

Jordan	87–73	Chinese Taipei

Taipei

July 14

Qatar	86–62	South Korea

Taipei

July 14

Australia U-19	84–78	Jordan

Taipei

July 14

Egypt	88–67	Chinese Taipei

Taipei

July 14

(United States) Athletes in Action	86–69	Kazakhstan

Taipei

July 15

Jordan	79–78	South Korea

Taipei

July 15

Australia U-19	75–54	Qatar

Taipei

July 15

Kazakhstan	84–69	Chinese Taipei

Taipei

July 15

(United States) Athletes in Action	93–76	Egypt

Taipei

July 16

South Korea	82–76	Australia U-19

Taipei

July 16

Egypt	74–66	Kazakhstan

Taipei

July 16

Jordan	79–52	Qatar

Taipei

July 16

(United States) Athletes in Action	102–86	Chinese Taipei

Taipei

=== Knockout stage ===
==== Championship Round ====
Semi-finals
July 17 – Hsinchuang Gymnasium
(United States) Athletes in Action	97
Qatar	90
July 17 – Hsinchuang Gymnasium
Jordan	75
Australia U-19	60

Final
July 19 – Hsinchuang Gymnasium
Jordan	93
(United States) Athletes in Action	91
Third place
July 19 – Hsinchuang Gymnasium
Australia U-19	91
Qatar	88

==== 5-8th Classification Round ====
Semi-finals
July 17 – Hsinchuang Gymnasium
Egypt	85
South Korea	81
July 17 – Hsinchuang Gymnasium
Kazakhstan	66
Chinese Taipei	56

Final
July 19 – Hsinchuang Gymnasium
Egypt	98
Kazakhstan	89
Third place
July 19 – Hsinchuang Gymnasium
South Korea	83
Chinese Taipei	74

=== Final standings ===
Winners	Jordan
runners-up	(United States) Athletes in Action
3rd	Australia U-19
4th	Qatar
5th	Egypt
6th	Kazakhstan
7th	South Korea
8th	Chinese Taipei

== Women's tournament ==
=== Preliminary round ===
Pos	Team	Pld	W	L	PF	PA	PD	PCT	Qualification
1	Chinese Taipei (H)	3	3	0	260	175	+85	1.000	Semifinals
2	Australia U-19	3	2	1	230	214	+16	.667	Semifinals
3	(South Korea) Woori Bank	3	1	2	207	221	−14	.333	Semifinals
4	Malaysia	3	0	3	164	251	−87	.000	Semifinals

Source: William Jones Cup
(H) Hosts

July 20

Report

Chinese Taipei	85–60	Woori Bank

Xinzhuang Gymnasium, Taipei

July 20

Report

Australia U-19	81–62	Malaysia

Xinzhuang Gymnasium, Taipei

July 21

Report

Australia U-19	76–72	Woori Bank

Xinzhuang Gymnasium, Taipei

July 21

Report

Chinese Taipei	95–42	Malaysia

Xinzhuang Gymnasium, Taipei

July 22

Report

Woori Bank	74–60	Malaysia

Xinzhuang Gymnasium, Taipei

July 22

Report

Chinese Taipei	80–73	Australia U-19

Xinzhuang Gymnasium, Taipei

=== Final round ===
Semifinals
1	Chinese Taipei	78
4	Malaysia	42
2	Australia U-19	96
3	(South Korea) Woori Bank	81

Finals
1	Chinese Taipei	55
2	Australia U-19	54
Third place
4	Malaysia	62
3	(South Korea) Woori Bank	84

==== Semifinals ====
July 23

Report

Chinese Taipei	78–42	Malaysia

Xinzhuang Gymnasium, Taipei

July 23

Report

Woori Bank (South Korea)	81–96	Australia U-19

Xinzhuang Gymnasium, Taipei

==== Third place ====
July 23

Report

Woori Bank (South Korea)	84–62	Malaysia

Xinzhuang Gymnasium, Taipei

==== Final ====
July 23

Report

Chinese Taipei	55–54	Australia U-19

Xinzhuang Gymnasium, Taipei

=== Final standings ===
Winners	Chinese Taipei
runners-up	Australia U-19
3rd	South Korea
4th	Malaysia
