= Elie Rustom =

Lebanese basketball player (born 1987)

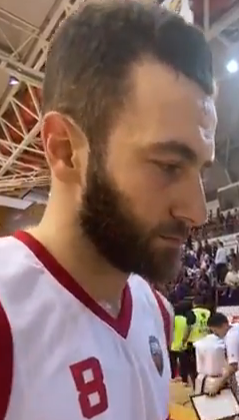

No. 9 – Sagesse SC
- Position: Guard/forward
- League: Lebanese Basketball League

Personal information
- Born: 2 May 1987 (age 39)
- Listed height: 6 ft 6 in (1.98 m)

Career information
- Playing career: 2004–present

Career history
- 2004–2007: Blue Stars
- 2007–2012: Mouttahed
- 2012–2016: Sagesse
- 2016–2017: Mouttahed
- 2017–2018: Champville
- 2018–2019: Homenetmen
- 2019–2020: Beirut Club
- 2020–2022: Champville
- 2022–2023: Beirut Club
- 2023: Dynamo Lebanon
- 2024: Champville
- 2025: Al Nasr
- 2025-present: Sagesse Club

Elie Rustom (Arabic: ندي نعيمه; born 2 May 1987) is a Lebanese basketball player for the Sagesse Club (Not official) of the Lebanese Basketball League. He is also a member of the Lebanon national basketball team. He previously played with Blue Stars.

== Basketball career ==
Rustom started to play basketball with Blue Stars youth team. He played two years for the youth team. In 2007 he signed with Al Mouttahed Tripoli.

In 2009 Rustom was called for the national team and participated in the 2009 William Jones Cup but was not called up to the final squad.

In 2010 he was also called by the national team. He played in 2010 William Jones Cup and FIBA Asia Stanković Cup 2010. He was in the starting 5 in all Lebanon's games in FIBA Asia Stanković Cup 2010 and also the 2010 FIBA World Championship. He was in the starting 5 for Mouttahed during the 2011 final four under coach Paul Caughter.

In 2011 he was called to the national team but he was injured during the preparations for the 2011 FIBA Asia Championship and could not make it to the final squad.

In 2012 Rustom signed for Lebanese Sagesse.

In 2016 he returned to his boyhood club Mouttahed, after spending four years with the Sagesse.

In 2017 he signed with Champville.

In 2018 Rustom sign with the defending champions Homenetmen.

In 2022, Rustom signed with defending champions Beirut Club.

In January 2025, Rustom signed with the Al Nasr of the UAE National Basketball League.
