= 2000 William Jones Cup =

Tournament information
- Dates: M: 13–29 July 2000; W: ?–?
- Host(s): Taiwan
- Teams: M: 10; W: ?

Final positions
- Champions: M: New Zealand; W: United States
- 1st runners-up: M: South Korea; W: Japan
- 2nd runners-up: M: Republic of China; W: Republic of China

The 2000 William Jones Cup (23rd tournament) took place in Taipei from 13 July–29 July.

== Standings ==
Team	Pld	W	L
New Zealand	6	6	0
South Korea	6	5	1
Republic of China	6	5	1
(Philippines) Laguna Lakers	6	3	3
Japan	5	3	2
Costa Rica	5	2	3
Malaysia	5	1	4
Republic of China	5	2	3
Hong Kong	5	0	5
South Africa Collegiate All-Stars	5	1	4

== Results ==
Preliminary Round

July 23

Republic of China	102–85	(Philippines) Laguna Lakers

July 23

Costa Rica	67–57	Republic of China B

July 23

Japan	90–65	Malaysia

July 23

South Korea	86–66	(South Africa) SA Collegiate All-Stars

July 24

Republic of China	80–44	Malaysia

July 24

South Korea	83–58	Republic of China B

July 24

(Philippines) Laguna Lakers	87–52	Hong Kong

July 24

New Zealand	89–57	(South Africa) SA Collegiate All-Stars

July 25

Republic of China B	74–73	(South Africa) SA Collegiate All-Stars

July 25

(Philippines) Laguna Lakers	83–58	Malaysia

July 25

Japan	84–61	Hong Kong

July 25

New Zealand	76–58	(South Africa) SA Collegiate All-Stars

July 26

Republic of China	90–80	Japan

July 26

New Zealand	89–33	Republic of China B

July 26

South Korea	88–69	Costa Rica

July 26

Malaysia	74–45	Hong Kong

July 27

(South Africa) SA Collegiate All-Stars	57–49	Costa Rica

July 27

(Philippines) Laguna Lakers	93–82	Japan

July 27

South Korea	52–75	New Zealand

July 27

Republic of China	82–30	Hong Kong

Semifinals

July 28

South Korea	87–78	Republic of China

July 28

New Zealand	67–37	(Philippines) Laguna Lakers

Finals

July 28

Battle for 9th

Republic of China B	77–56	Hong Kong

July 28

Battle for 7th

Costa Rica	87–59	Malaysia

July 29

Battle for 5th

Japan	75–58	(South Africa) SA Collegiate All-Stars

July 29

Battle for 3rd

Republic of China	83–73	(Philippines) Laguna Lakers

July 29

Championship

New Zealand	78–67	South Korea
