= 1977 William Jones Memorial Cup =

Tournament information
- Dates: M: 6 July 1977; W: 18 July 1977–M: 16 July 1977; W: 2 August 1977
- Teams: M: 9 W: ?

Final positions
- Champions: M: (United States) Athletes in Action - Eastern Unit; W: (South Korea) Korean All-Stars
- 1st runners-up: M: (United States) Eastern Washington Eagles; W: (Taiwan) Cathay Life
- 2nd runners-up: M: (Taiwan) Flying Camel; W: (France) Christa Dream

The 1977 William Jones Memorial Cup was the first edition of the William Jones Cup held in July 1977 in the span of two weeks.

The games were held in a 10,000 capacity pavilion with poor lighting conditions. In the group stage, the 9 teams were divided into two groups with the top two teams from each group advancing to the next round.

The Eastern Unit of the United States–based Athletes in Action won the 1977 William Jones Cup. Eastern Washington Eagles and the Flying Camels ended up second and third respectively.

== Participants ==
- (United States) Athletes in Action – Eastern Unit
- Denmark
- (United States) Eastern Washington Eagles
- (Taiwan) Flying Camel
- South Korea
- Saudi Arabia
- (Taiwan) RSEA Engineering
- (Philippines) Yanmar Diesel
- (Taiwan) Yue Long

Source (Note: No source was retrieved regarding the nature of the teams from South Korea, Saudi Arabia, and Denmark, if these were club or national team sides. Philippines was represented by Yanmar Diesel which finished 5th.)

== Awards ==
1977 William Jones Memorial Cup
(United States)
Athletes in Action - Eastern Unit
First title
