= 1982 William Jones Cup =

Tournament information
- Dates: M: ? June–5 July 1982; W: ?–July 1982
- Teams: M: 8 W: ?

Final positions
- Champions: M: United States; W: Canada
- 1st runners-up: M: Canada; W: United States
- 2nd runners-up: M: France; W: Australia

The 1982 William Jones Cup (sixth tournament) took place in Taipei.The tournament was held in a span of two weeks with the final being held on July 5, 1982.

== Final ==
July 5

United States	79–62	Canada

Taipei

== Standings ==
Rank	Team
1st place, gold medalist(s)	United States
2nd place, silver medalist(s)	Canada
3rd place, bronze medalist(s)	France
4	Sweden
5	South Korea
6	Colombia
7	Republic of China
8	New Zealand

Notes: Some may be club sides rather than national teams
