= 2011 William Jones Cup =

Tournament information
- Location: New Taipei
- Dates: M: August 6–14; W: July 31 ––August 4
- Host(s): Taiwan
- Teams: M: 8 W: 5
- Website: 2011 TAIYEN Jones Cup

Final positions
- Champions: M: Iran; W: Chinese Taipei
- 1st runners-up: M: South Korea; W: Japan
- 2nd runners-up: M: Philippines; W: University All-Stars

The 2011 TAIYEN William Jones Cup was the 33rd tournament of the William Jones Cup that took place at the Hsinchuang Gymnasium in New Taipei, Republic of China (commonly known as Taiwan) from August 6 to 13, 2011.

== Men's tournament ==
=== Squads ===
South Africa had committed a week prior to the tournament but withdrew to funding problems. UAE, on the other hand, made their tournament debut. Unlike the previous tournament, which had a round robin tournament format, this year's event features a medal round after the preliminary round robin to determine a champion.

=== Preliminary round ===
Qualified to the semifinals Qualified to the 5th place playoffs

Team	Pld	W	L	PF	PA	PD	Pts	Tie*
South Korea	7	6	1	623	453	+170	13	
Philippines	7	5	2	580	497	+83	12	1–0
Iran	7	5	2	490	426	+64	12	0–1
Chinese Taipei	7	4	3	565	561	+3	11	1–0
Jordan	7	4	3	557	516	+41	11	0–1
Japan	7	3	4	524	549	−25	10	
Malaysia	7	1	6	439	621	−182	8	
United Arab Emirates	7	0	7	507	651	−144	7	

- Head-to-head record

All times in UTC+8.

August 6
13:00

Jordan	91–72	United Arab Emirates

Hsinchuang Gymnasium, New Taipei

August 6
15:00

South Korea	110–50	Malaysia

Hsinchuang Gymnasium, New Taipei

August 6
17:00

Philippines	73–59	Iran

Hsinchuang Gymnasium, New Taipei

August 6
19:00

Chinese Taipei	99–72	Japan

Hsinchuang Gymnasium, New Taipei

August 7
13:00

Malaysia	63–93	Jordan

Hsinchuang Gymnasium, New Taipei

August 7
15:00

South Korea	102–54	United Arab Emirates

Hsinchuang Gymnasium, New Taipei

August 7
17:00

Japan	58–77	Iran

Hsinchuang Gymnasium, New Taipei

August 7
19:00

Philippines	90–78	Chinese Taipei

Hsinchuang Gymnasium, New Taipei

August 8
13:00

United Arab Emirates	85–92	Japan

Hsinchuang Gymnasium, New Taipei

August 8
15:00

Philippines	72–76	Jordan

Hsinchuang Gymnasium, New Taipei

August 8
17:00

South Korea	77–59	Iran

Hsinchuang Gymnasium, New Taipei

August 8
19:00

Chinese Taipei	104–54	Malaysia

Hsinchuang Gymnasium, New Taipei

August 9
13:00

Iran	84–55	United Arab Emirates

Hsinchuang Gymnasium, New Taipei

August 9
15:00

Philippines	86–68	Malaysia

Hsinchuang Gymnasium, New Taipei

August 9
17:00

Japan	67–69	South Korea

Hsinchuang Gymnasium, New Taipei

August 9
19:00

Jordan	75–77	Chinese Taipei

Hsinchuang Gymnasium, New Taipei

August 10
13:00

Iran	69–49	Malaysia

Hsinchuang Gymnasium, New Taipei

August 10
15:00

Jordan	70–87	Japan

Hsinchuang Gymnasium, New Taipei

August 10
17:00

Philippines	70–78	South Korea

Hsinchuang Gymnasium, New Taipei

August 10
19:00

Chinese Taipei	92–87	United Arab Emirates

Hsinchuang Gymnasium, New Taipei

August 11
13:00

Japan	70–55	Malaysia

Hsinchuang Gymnasium, New Taipei

August 11
15:00

Philippines	95–60	United Arab Emirates

Hsinchuang Gymnasium, New Taipei

August 11
17:00

South Korea	77–85	Jordan

Hsinchuang Gymnasium, New Taipei

August 11
19:00

Chinese Taipei	47–74	Iran

Hsinchuang Gymnasium, New Taipei

August 12
13:00

United Arab Emirates	89–100	Malaysia

Hsinchuang Gymnasium, New Taipei

August 12
15:00

Iran	68–67	Jordan

Hsinchuang Gymnasium, New Taipei

August 12
17:00

Philippines	94–78	Japan

Hsinchuang Gymnasium, New Taipei

August 12
19:00

Chinese Taipei	68–110	South Korea

Hsinchuang Gymnasium, New Taipei

=== Semifinals ===
August 13
15:00

Malaysia	53–98	Japan

Hsinchuang Gymnasium, New Taipei

August 13
17:00

Semifinals Game #1

Chinese Taipei	85–90 (OT)	South Korea

Hsinchuang Gymnasium, New Taipei

August 13
19:00

Semifinals Game #2

Philippines	59–78	Iran

Hsinchuang Gymnasium, New Taipei

=== Finals ===
August 14
15:00

Battle for 5th Place

Japan	77–73	Jordan

Hsinchuang Gymnasium, New Taipei

August 14
17:00

Battle for 3rd Place

Chinese Taipei	72–82	Philippines

Hsinchuang Gymnasium, New Taipei

August 14
19:00

Championship Game

South Korea	59–66	Iran

Hsinchuang Gymnasium, New Taipei

=== Brackets ===
==== Championship bracket ====
Semi-finals
August 13 – New Taipei City (OT)
South Korea	90
Chinese Taipei	85
August 13 – New Taipei City
Philippines	59
Iran	78

Final
August 14 – New Taipei City
South Korea	59
Iran	66
Third place
August 14 – New Taipei City
Chinese Taipei	72
Philippines	82

==== Fifth-place bracket ====
Semifinal			Fifth place game
			1	Jordan	73
2	Japan	98		Japan	77
3	Malaysia	53

=== Final standings ===
Rank	Team	Record
Gold medal	Iran	7–2
Silver medal	South Korea	7–2
Bronze medal	Philippines	6–3
4	Chinese Taipei	4–5
Failed to reach semifinals
5	Japan	5–4
6	Jordan	4–4
7	Malaysia	1–7
8	United Arab Emirates	0–7

=== Awards ===
2011 TAIYEN Jones Cup

Iran
Third title

== Women's tournament ==
Team	Pld	W	L	PF	PA	PD	Pts
Chinese Taipei	4	4	0	286	220	+66	8
Japan	4	3	1	298	248	+50	7
(Chinese Taipei) University All-Stars	4	2	2	240	261	−21	6
India	4	1	3	235	325	−90	5
South Korea	4	0	4	208	249	−41	4

July 31
16:00

University All-Stars (Chinese Taipei)	71–64	India

Hsinchuang Gymnasium, New Taipei

July 31
18:30

Chinese Taipei	72–62	Japan

Hsinchuang Gymnasium, New Taipei

August 1
17:00

South Korea	43–52	(Chinese Taipei) University All-Stars

Hsinchuang Gymnasium, New Taipei

August 1
19:00

India	49–94	Chinese Taipei

Hsinchuang Gymnasium, New Taipei

August 2
17:00

University All-Stars (Chinese Taipei)	58–77	Japan

Hsinchuang Gymnasium, New Taipei

August 2
19:00

South Korea	59–63	India

Hsinchuang Gymnasium, New Taipei

August 3
17:00

Japan	61–56	South Korea

Hsinchuang Gymnasium, New Taipei

August 3
19:00

Chinese Taipei	77–59	(Chinese Taipei) University All-Stars

Hsinchuang Gymnasium, New Taipei

August 4
17:00

India	62–98	Japan

Hsinchuang Gymnasium, New Taipei

August 4
19:00

South Korea	50–73	Chinese Taipei

Hsinchuang Gymnasium, New Taipei

== Awards ==
2011 TAIYEN Jones Cup

Chinese Taipei
Third title

- Note: As combined Chinese Taipei national team. Chinese Taipei Blue won the 2004 edition.
