= Laguna Lakers =

- Leagues: MBA (1998–2001)
- Founded: 1998
- History: Laguna Lakers; 1998–2001; FedEx-Laguna Lakers; 2001
- Arena: San Luis Sports Complex
- Location: Santa Cruz, Laguna, Philippines
- Team colors: Purple and white

The Laguna Lakers (or the FedEx-Laguna Lakers) were a professional basketball team in the now-defunct Metropolitan Basketball Association from 1998 to 2001. The team was owned by Bert Lina, owner of the FedEx franchise in the Philippines. The team moniker was taken as a reference for the province's proximity to Laguna de Baý, a similar action taken by the then-Minneapolis Lakers of the National Basketball Association. The team played its home games at the San Luis Sports Complex.

== History ==
In 1998, the Metropolitan Basketball Association was formed as a regional-based professional league which also challenged the commercial Philippine Basketball Association. The Lakers of coach Bonnie Garcia were paraded by former University of Manila stars Biboy Simon and Jovy Sese, Manuel Luis Quezon University standout Wynne Arboleda and the former Letran Knights high-flying Mike Garcia, known for wearing different shoe colors and his dunks.

The Lakers went 14–8 in the inaugural year but failed to enter the Northern Conference Finals. Simon recorded an MBA record 54 points in one game, which remained until the league's closure. In 1999, the Lakers went 16–14 in the elimination round and made the playoffs for the second straight year. The team added fil-Americans Cris Clay and Rudy Hatfield to bolster their lineup. However, Laguna was eliminated by the Pampanga Dragons, in a hard-fought three-game Wildcard series which saw Dragons point guard Roel Bravo hitting a three-pointer to give Pampanga the win.

In 2000, Laguna made its only MBA finals appearance in the Crossover Conference tournament, losing to the San Juan Knights in the finals. The Lakers made it to the National Playoffs, only to be eliminated by the same Knights team, 2–0. Jeff Flowers joined the team to power the Lakers frontline.

Laguna was renamed as the FedEx-Laguna Lakers for the 2001 season but lost to San Juan in the playoffs for the third-straight time.

=== William Jones Cup ===
The Laguna Lakers competed at the William Jones Cup as the Philippine representative in 2000 and 2001. In the 2001 edition, the Fed-Ex Laguna Lakers, with some players from the Philippine national youth team, finished fourth after losing to Russian basketball team, Lokomotiv Novosibirsk in the de facto third place play-off with the final score of 71-81.

=== Departure ===
In 2001, the PBA's Tanduay Rhum Masters sold its PBA franchise to the Lina group for a reported 60–75 million pesos. The development led to the Lina group's departure from the MBA to concentrate on their new PBA franchise, which became named as the FedEx Express.

The MBA, as a result, lost its Laguna franchise and one of its biggest sponsors, FedEx, before closing shop at the middle of the 2002 season.

== Home Arenas ==
- San Luis Sports Complex (1998–2001)

== 1999 Roster ==
Laguna Lakers roster
Players
Coaches

Pos.	No.	Nat.	Name	Ht.	Wt.
F	1	(Philippines)	Richard Melencio	6 ft 2 in (1.88 m)
G	2	(Philippines)	Alex Cainglet	6 ft 1 in (1.85 m)
G	3	(Philippines)	Rolly Basilides	6 ft 3 in (1.91 m)
G	4	(Philippines)	Oligario Cortes	6 ft 1 in (1.85 m)
F	6	(Philippines)	Alvin Teng	6 ft 3 in (1.91 m)
G	8	(Philippines)	Ramon Regidor	5 ft 10 in (1.78 m)
F	9	(Philippines)	Randy Alcantara	6 ft 3 in (1.91 m)
G	10	(Philippines)	Oscar Simon	6 ft 1 in (1.85 m)
F	11	(Philippines)	Michael Garcia	4 ft 8 in (1.42 m)
C	16	(Philippines)	Ryan Bernardo	6 ft 4 in (1.93 m)
F	17	(Philippines)	Melvin Taguines	6 ft 3 in (1.91 m)
F	18	(Philippines)	Edgar Ignacio	6 ft 5 in (1.96 m)
G	19	(Philippines)	Wynne Arboleda	5 ft 11 in (1.80 m)
C	20	(Philippines)	Valentin Domingo	6 ft 7 in (2.01 m)
C	27	(Philippines)	Jovito Sese	6 ft 6 in (1.98 m)

Head coach

- Bonnie Garcia

Assistant coach(es)

- Renato Baena
- Cecilio Marcelino

Legend

- (C) Team captain
- Injured

== Trivia ==
- The Lakers are so named because Laguna encloses Laguna de Bay, a lake. In addition, "Laguna" came from Spanish word lago, which means "lake."

== See also ==
- Metropolitan Basketball Association
- Air21 Express
