= William Jones Cup =

International basketball tournament

- Most recent season or competition: 2026 William Jones Cup
- Sport: Basketball
- Founded: 1975; 51 years ago
- First season: 1977
- No. of teams: M: 8 W: 6
- Country: Taiwan
- Most recent champions: M: (South Korea) Wonju DB Promy (1st title, 3rd title for country); W: Japan Universiade (2nd title, 7th for country)
- Most titles: M: United States (16 titles); W: South Korea (12 titles)
- Related competitions: FIBA Stanković Continental Champions' Cup
- Website: jonescup.meetagile.com (in Chinese)

The William Jones Cup International Basketball Tournament (simplified Chinese: 威廉琼斯盃国际篮球邀请赛; traditional Chinese: 威廉瓊斯盃國際籃球邀請賽; pinyin: wēi lián qióng sī bēi guó jì lán qiú yāo qǐng sài), also known as the William Jones Cup, is an international basketball tournament organized by the Chinese Taipei Basketball Association (CTBA) held annually since 1977 in Taiwan.

In both men's and women's tournaments, each country can only be represented by one team, which could be its national team, youth team, club team, or an all-star selection, except for the hosts Taiwan, which could opt to have two teams.

Since the tournament is not sanctioned by FIBA, the Taiwanese national team which usually competes as "Chinese Taipei" is referred to as "Republic of China" by the organizers.

The tournament has not been held from 2020 to 2022 due to the COVID-19 pandemic in Taiwan.

== History ==
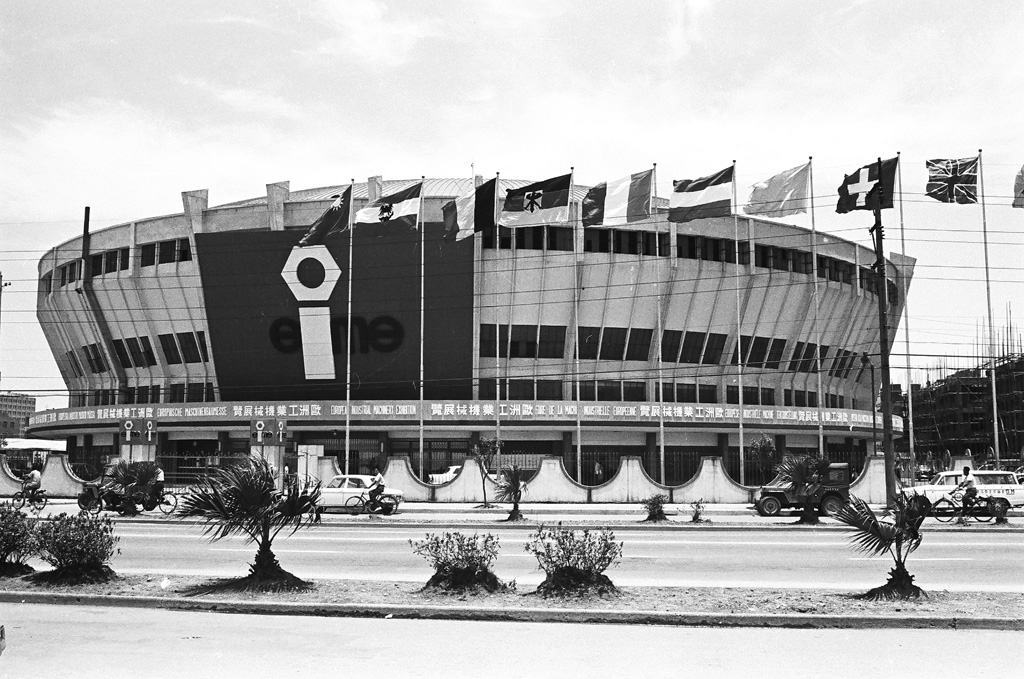
The Chung-Hua Gymnasium, the main venue of the William Jones Cup from its inception until 1988.

The tournament was conceived in 1977 as a tribute to Englishman Renato William Jones, who was FIBA secretary-general for 44 years and was instrumental in the granting of zone commission status for Asia at the 1964 FIBA World Congress in Tokyo. Jones also attended the Asian Basketball Championships in 1963, which was held in Taipei.

Following the admission of the People's Republic of China as a regular member of the Asian Basketball Confederation in 1975, Taiwan was suspended due to refusing to compete as "Chinese Taipei". This led to the Republic of China Basketball Association to establish the William Jones Cup with the support of Jones.

The first edition of the tournament was held in 1977, with a men's and women's tournament organized. It features invited club and teams from various countries. Games were held at the 12,000 capacity Chung-Hua Gymnasium in the early edition of the tournament.

The William Jones Cup has been cancelled in three separate occasions; in 1989 when Chung-Hua was razed by a fire, in 2003 due to the SARS outbreak, and from 2020 to 2022 due to the COVID-19 pandemic.

== Champions ==
=== Men's tournament ===
==== Summaries ====
Edition	Year	Champions	Runners-up	Third place
1st	1977	(United States) Athletes in Action - Eastern Unit	(United States) Eastern Washington Eagles	(Taiwan) Flying Camel
2nd	1978	(United States) American Buluside	South Korea	(United States) American College
3rd	1979	Not held		
4th	1980	Sweden	United States	Panama
5th	1981	(Philippines) Northern Cement	Sweden	France
6th	1982	United States	Canada	France
7th	1983	(United States) Vanderbilt Commodores	(Scotland) Murray International Metals	Italy
8th	1984	United States	Canada	Netherlands
9th	1985	(Philippines) San Miguel	United States	Sweden
10th	1986	United States	South Korea	Japan
11th	1987	West Germany	United States	Australia
12th	1988	United States	Australia	South Korea
	1989	Cancelled due to fire which affected the main venue		
13th	1990	Mexico	Poland	(United States) A-10 All-Stars
14th	1991	United States	Soviet Union	South Korea
15th	1992	(United States) Marathon Oil	(Czech Republic) USK Praha	United States
16th	1993	(United States) University of Hawaii	(Taiwan) Hung Kuo	(Ukraine) Spartak
17th	1994	United States	(Taiwan) Yulong	Hungary
18th	1995	United States	Slovakia	(Taiwan) Hung Kuo
19th	1996	Canada	Russia	United States
20th	1997	(United States) Kangoo Jumps	(Lithuania) BC Lietuvos Rytas	Guanghua
21st	1998	(Philippines) Philippine Centennial Team	Taiwan	South Korea
22nd	1999	South Korea	Taiwan	New Zealand
23rd	2000	New Zealand	South Korea	Taiwan
24th	2001	Taiwan	South Korea	(Russia) Lokomotiv Novosibirsk
25th	2002	(Australia) Great Mates	(Canada) University of Alberta	Japan
	2003	Cancelled due to SARS outbreak		
26th	2004	Republic of China White	Canada	(Australia) Perth Wildcats
27th	2005	(United States) Passing Lane	Taiwan	Philippines
28th	2006	(United States) Athletes in Action	Taiwan	Qatar
29th	2007	Jordan	Lebanon	Philippines
30th	2008	Jordan	(United States) Athletes in Action	Australia
31st	2009	Iran	Jordan	Lebanon
32nd	2010	Iran	Lebanon	Japan
33rd	2011	Iran	South Korea	Philippines
34th	2012	Philippines	(Iran) Mahram Tehran	(United States) UPG
35th	2013	Iran	Taiwan	South Korea
36th	2014	(South Korea) Ulsan Mobis Phoebus	Republic of China Blue	Egypt
37th	2015	Iran	Philippines	Republic of China Blue
38th	2016	(Philippines) Mighty Sports	South Korea	Republic of China A
39th	2017	Team Canada 150 (Note: The team is not the Canadian national team. The team was organized by the 3D Global Sports Canada group and played as "Team Canada 150" for the 2017 edition to commemorate the 150th anniversary of the Canadian Confederation.)	Atletas All-Star Lithuania	South Korea
40th	2018	(Canada) 3D Global Sports	Iran B	South Korea
41st	2019	(Philippines) Mighty Sports	South Korea	Japan
	2020–2022	Cancelled due to the COVID-19 pandemic		
42nd	2023	(United States) UC Irvine Anteaters	Republic of China Blue	(South Korea) Anyang KGC
43rd	2024	(Philippines) Strong Group Athletics	Republic of China Blue	Ukraine
44th	2025	(Philippines) Strong Group Athletics	Republic of China Blue	Bahrain
45th	2026	(South Korea) Wonju DB Promy	(United States) UC Irvine Anteaters	Republic of China Blue

==== Medal table ====
Country	Gold	Silver	Bronze	Total
United States	16	6	6	28
Philippines	8	1	3	12
Iran	5	2	0	7
South Korea	3	7	7	17
Canada	3	4	0	7
Taiwan	2	11	6	19
Jordan	2	1	0	3
Australia	1	1	2	4
Sweden	1	1	1	3
New Zealand	1	0	1	2
Mexico	1	0	0	1
West Germany	1	0	0	1
Lebanon	0	2	1	3
Lithuania	0	2	0	2
Russia	0	1	1	2
Czechoslovakia	0	1	0	1
Poland	0	1	0	1
Scotland	0	1	0	1
Slovakia	0	1	0	1
Soviet Union	0	1	0	1
Japan	0	0	4	4
France	0	0	2	2
Ukraine	0	0	2	2
Bahrain	0	0	1	1
Egypt	0	0	1	1
Hungary	0	0	1	1
Italy	0	0	1	1
Netherlands	0	0	1	1
Panama	0	0	1	1
Qatar	0	0	1	1

=== Women's tournament ===
==== Summaries ====
Year	Champions	Runners-up	Third place
1977	(South Korea) Korean All-Stars	(Taiwan) Cathay Life	(France) Christa Dream
1978	Not held		
1979	United States	(South Korea) Korean All-Stars	(Taiwan) China Airlines
1980	South Korea	Taiwan	United States
1981	South Korea	United States	Taiwan
1982	Canada	United States	Australia
1983	South Korea	Italy	Netherlands
1984	United States	Brazil	Italy
1985	United States	Canada	South Korea
1986	Not held		
1987	United States	South Korea	West Germany
1988	South Korea	United States	Taiwan
1989	Cancelled due to fire which affected the main venue		
1990	Hungary	Taiwan	Brazil
1991	South Korea	Japan	United States
1992	(United States) American All-Stars	Australia Youth	Japan
1993	(Taiwan) Cathay Life	Japan	United States
1994	United States	South Korea	(Kazakhstan) Al Hasa
1995	(Taiwan) Cathay Life	South Korea	United States
1996	United States	Slovakia	Australia
1997	South Korea	United States	(Taiwan) Cathay Life
1998	United States	Taiwan	Japan
1999	Taiwan	New Zealand	Australia
2000	United States	Japan	Taiwan
2001	Not held		
2002	Russia	Taiwan	Japan
2003	Cancelled due to SARS outbreak		
2004	Republic of China Blue	South Korea	Republic of China White
2005	Taiwan	New Zealand	(China) Zhejiang Huadong
2006	Japan	Taiwan	Italy
2007	Australia	Republic of China Blue	United States
2008	Taiwan	Australia	South Korea
2009	South Korea	Taiwan	Japan
2010	South Korea	Taiwan	(Taiwan) University All-Stars
2011	Taiwan	Japan	Chinese Taipei University
2012	(Taiwan) Cathay Life	(Taiwan) Chunghwa Telecom	Japan
2013	South Korea	Japan	Taiwan
2014	Canada	(Japan) Denso Iris	South Korea
2015	South Korea	Japan B	Republic of China A
2016	South Korea	Japan	Republic of China A
2017	Japan U24	Republic of China Blue	New Zealand
2018	New Zealand	Japan B	Republic of China A
2019	(Japan) Mitsubishi Electric Koalas	New Zealand	Republic of China White
2020–2022	Cancelled due to the COVID-19 pandemic		
2023	(Japan) Chanson V-Magic	(South Korea) Busan BNK Sum	Republic of China Blue
2024	Japan Universiade	Republic of China Blue	Republic of China White
2025	Japan Universiade	South Korea	WUG CTUSF Training
2026	Japan	Republic of China Blue	Lebanon

==== Medal table ====
Country	Gold	Silver	Bronze	Total
South Korea	12	7	3	22
United States	9	4	5	18
Taiwan (Note: Includes secondary teams; Taiwan fields two teams in some editions)	8	13	16	37
Japan	7	9	5	21
Canada	2	1	0	3
New Zealand	1	3	1	5
Australia	1	2	3	6
Hungary	1	0	0	1
Russia	1	0	0	1
Italy	0	1	2	3
Brazil	0	1	1	2
Slovakia	0	1	0	1
France	0	0	1	1
Kazakhstan	0	0	1	1
Lebanon	0	0	1	1
Netherlands	0	0	1	1
PR China	0	0	1	1
West Germany	0	0	1	1

== See also ==
- List of sporting events in Taiwan
