= 1985 William Jones Cup =

Tournament information
- Dates: M: ?–July 1985; W: ?–July 1985
- Teams: M: 14; W: ?

Final positions
- Champions: M: (Philippines) San Miguel; W: United States
- 1st runners-up: M: United States; W: Canada
- 2nd runners-up: M: Sweden; W: South Korea

The 1985 William Jones Memorial Cup is the ninth edition of the William Jones Cup.

Fourteen teams participated in the preliminary round composing of four groups with the top two from each group advancing. The team from the Philippines defeated the United States in the final at overtime.

== Participants ==
Top 8 (Note: Some of these teams may be club sides rather than national teams. Philippines was represented by San Miguel. The Chinese Taipei team within the top 8 is the national team. Canada is represented by its B national team.)

- Canada B
- Chinese Taipei
- Italy
- South Korea
- San Miguel (Philippines)
- Sweden
- United States
- Uruguay

Other

- West Germany
- Japan
- (Chinese Taipei) Kwanghwa
- Malaysia
- Saudi Arabia
- Thailand

== Preliminary round ==
Groups (Note: Exact naming of the Groupings (e.g. Group "X") is unknown)
Group A	Group B	Group C	Group D
(Philippines) San Miguel	United States	Sweden	Uruguay
Canada B	South Korea	Chinese Taipei	Italy
West Germany	(Chinese Taipei) Kwanghwa	Malaysia	Thailand
	Saudi Arabia	Japan	

=== Group A ===
July

Report

Canada B	60–51	West Germany

Taipei

July

Report

San Miguel (Philippines)	69–58	Canada B

Taipei

July

Report

San Miguel (Philippines)	82–61	West Germany

Taipei

=== Group B ===
July

Saudi Arabia	?–?	(Chinese Taipei) Kwanghwa

Taipei

July

United States	W–L	South Korea

Taipei

July

Report

United States	96–50	Saudi Arabia

Taipei

July

Report

South Korea	83–57	(Chinese Taipei) Kwanghwa

Taipei

July

Report

United States	81–56	(Chinese Taipei) Kwanghwa
Pts: Gattison 15

Taipei

July

Report

South Korea	82–61	Saudi Arabia

Taipei

=== Group C ===
July

Sweden	?–?	Japan

Taipei

July

Chinese Taipei	?–?	Japan

Taipei

July

Sweden	?–?	Malaysia

Taipei

July

Chinese Taipei	?–?	Malaysia

Taipei

July

Report

Sweden	75–71	Chinese Taipei

Taipei

July

Report

Malaysia	76–59	Japan

Taipei

=== Group D ===
July

Uruguay	W–L	Thailand

Taipei

July

Report

Uruguay	100–83	Italy

Taipei

July

Report

Italy	86–52	Thailand

Taipei

== Final round ==
Known matches

8 July

Report

Uruguay	50–49	Canada B

Taipei

8 July

Report

United States	66–62	Chinese Taipei

Taipei

8 July

Report

San Miguel (Philippines)	96–75	Italy

Taipei

9 July

Sweden	vs.	Canada

Taipei

9 July

San Miguel (Philippines)	108–86	South Korea

Taipei

9 July

United States	W–L	Italy

Taipei

12 July

Report

United States	55–47	Canada B

Taipei

12 July

Report

San Miguel (Philippines)	80–66	Chinese Taipei

Taipei

12 July

Report

South Korea	86–50	Italy

Taipei

13 July

Report

United States	80–65	Sweden
Pts: Pressley 17

Taipei

14 July

Report

Uruguay	79–63	South Korea

Taipei

14 July

Report

Sweden	80–77	Italy

Taipei

14 July

Report

Chinese Taipei	70–66	Canada B

Taipei

14 July

Report

Sweden	76–63	Uruguay

Taipei

15 July

Report 1, 2

San Miguel (Philippines)	108–100 (OT)	United States
Scoring by half: 40–40, 47–47 Overtime: 21–13
Pts: Engelland 43		Pts: Gattison 28

Taipei

== Awards ==
1985 William Jones Memorial Cup
(Philippines)
San Miguel
Second title (Note: First title was won as "Northern Cement" basketball team.)

== Final standings ==
- (gold) (Philippines) San Miguel 7–0
- (silver) United States 6–1
- (bronze) Sweden
- 4th Uruguay
- 5th Chinese Taipei
- 6th South Korea
- 7th Italy
- 8th Canada B

Others: Preliminary Round (9th–14th)
