= Basketball at the East Asian Games =

The East Asian Games included competitions in the sport of basketball at all six of the Games held between 1993 and 2013. The Chinese Taipei national basketball team won the gold medal at three of the Games.

== Men's tournaments ==
Year	Host	Final Standing		
Year	Host	Winner	Runner-up	Third Place
1993	Shanghai; China	China	South Korea	North Korea
1997	Busan; South Korea	Chinese Taipei	South Korea	China
2001	Osaka; Japan	China	Chinese Taipei	Japan
2005	Macau; Macau	Chinese Taipei	South Korea	China
2009	Hong Kong; Hong Kong	South Korea	Chinese Taipei	Japan
2013	Tianjin; China	Chinese Taipei	China	South Korea

== Women's tournaments ==
Year	Host	Final Standing		
Year	Host	Winner	Runner-up	Third Place
1993	Shanghai; China	China	South Korea	Japan
1997	Busan; South Korea	South Korea	Japan	China
2001	Osaka; Japan	China	South Korea	Japan
2005	Macau; Macau	China	Chinese Taipei	South Korea
2009	Hong Kong; Hong Kong	China	Chinese Taipei	Japan
2013	Tianjin; China	China	Japan	Chinese Taipei

== Medal table ==
Rank	Nation	Gold	Silver	Bronze	Total
1	China (CHN)	7	1	3	11
2	Chinese Taipei (TPE)	3	4	1	8
3	South Korea (KOR)	2	5	2	9
4	Japan (JPN)	0	2	5	7
5	North Korea (PRK)	0	0	1	1
Totals (5 entries)		12	12	12	36

== See also ==
- Basketball at the Asian Games
- FIBA Asia Championship
