= Chung-Hua Gymnasium =

Arena in Taipei, Taiwan

- 中華體育館
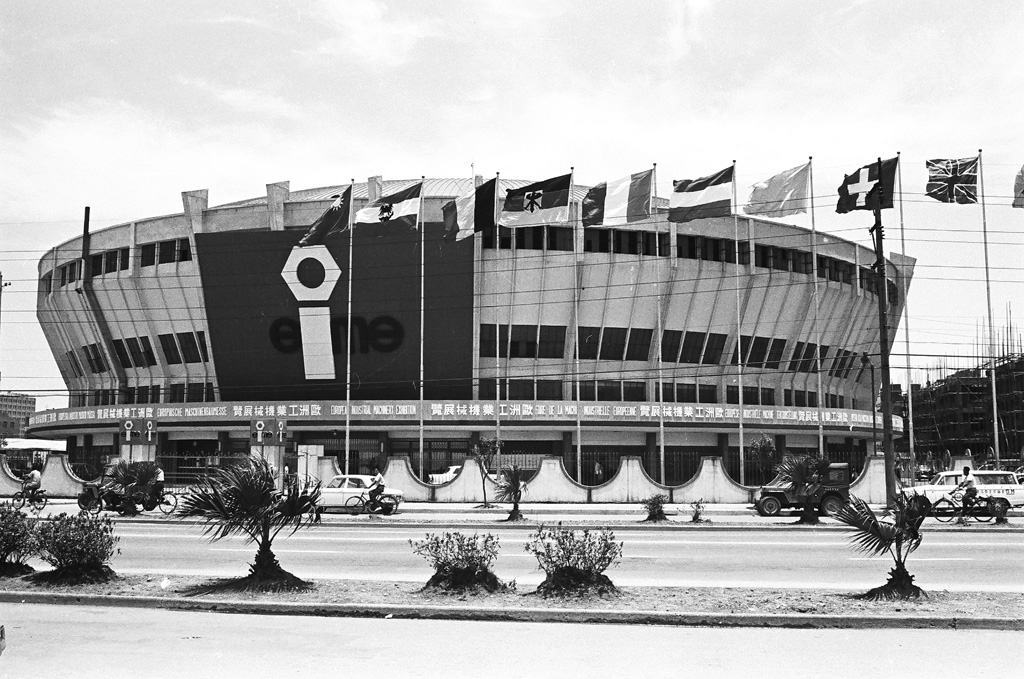
- Interactive map of Chung-Hua Gymnasium
- Address: Taipei; Taiwan
- Capacity: 12,000
- Type: Indoor arena

Construction
- Groundbreaking: March 1963
- Built: October 1963
- Demolished: 1989
- Years active: 1963–1989

Tenant
- William Jones Cup (1977–1988)

The Chung-Hua Gymnasium (Chinese: 中華體育館; pinyin: Zhōnghuá Tǐyùguǎn; or 臺北市中華體育文化中心, lit. 'Taipei City Chung-Hua Sports and Cultural Activity Center') was an indoor arena in Taipei, Taiwan.

== History ==
Taiwan won the right to host the 1963 ABC Championship in the early 1960s. However the only suitable venue the Three Services Stadium has been demolished. Republic of China Basketball Association chairman Yi Guorui approached Thailand-based Chinese businessman Lin Guochang to build a new venue.

The Chung-Hua Gymnasium was built on a site of an anti-aircraft artillery unit from March to October 1983 in time for the ABC Championship. Lin invested NT$30 million for the construction of the 12,000 capacity stadium. It is the largest indoor arena in Taiwan at the time.

The first edition of the William Jones Cup opened on July 6, 1977 at the Chung-Hua Gymnasium The arena also hosted national events and music concerts. It hosted the succeeding editions of the William Jones Cupuntil the Chung-Hua Gymnasium was razed by fire in 1989.
