= 2013 William Jones Cup =

Basketball tournament

Tournament information
- Location: New Taipei
- Dates: M: July 6–15; W: ?–?
- Host(s): Taiwan
- Teams: M: 9 W: ?
- Website: 2013wjc.basketball-tpe.org

Final positions
- Champions: M: Iran; W: South Korea
- 1st runners-up: M: Chinese Taipei; W: Japan
- 2nd runners-up: M: South Korea; W: Chinese Taipei

The 2013 William Jones Cup was the 35th tournament of the William Jones Cup that took place at the Xinzhuang Gymnasium in New Taipei, Republic of China (commonly known as Taiwan) from July 6 to July 15. Iran's national basketball team went on to win their fourth title by winning all of their seven games in the tournament.

Due to the 2013 Guang Da Xing No. 28 incident, Taiwanese officials withdrew its invitation for the Philippines men's national basketball team, the defending champions of the tournament, citing that the withdrawal of the invitation would ensure the safety of the Philippine representatives following the diplomatic incident between the Philippines and the host country (Taiwan). Egypt's national basketball team replaced the Philippines and made its debut in the tournament.

== Men's tournament ==
=== Team standings ===
| Team | Pld | W | L | PF | PA | PD | Pts | Tie* |
|---|---|---|---|---|---|---|---|---|
| Iran | 7 | 7 | 0 | 520 | 427 | +93 | 14 | |
| Chinese Taipei | 7 | 5 | 2 | 542 | 500 | +42 | 12 | 1–0 |
| South Korea | 7 | 5 | 2 | 517 | 469 | +48 | 12 | 0–1 |
| Pro Basketball Alumni | 7 | 4 | 3 | 559 | 539 | +20 | 11 | 1–0 |
| Egypt | 7 | 4 | 3 | 506 | 513 | –7 | 11 | 0-1 |
| Jordan | 7 | 2 | 5 | 471 | 534 | –63 | 9 | |
| Japan | 7 | 1 | 6 | 459 | 489 | –30 | 8 | |
| Kuang-hua | 7 | 0 | 7 | 509 | 612 | –103 | 7 | |
| Lebanon (disqualified) | 7 | 2 | 5 | 474 | 508 | –34 | 9 | |

Notes:

- Tiebreaker based on head-to-head record.
- All of the games involving Lebanon were forfeited after they were suspended indefinitely by FIBA due to unresolved conflicts within the country's national basketball federation.

=== Results ===
All times in UTC+8.

July 6

Report

| Lebanon (disqualified) | 66–70 | Kuang-hua |

Xinzhuang Gymnasium, New Taipei

July 6

Report

| South Korea | 80–63 | Egypt |

Xinzhuang Gymnasium, New Taipei

July 6

Report

| Jordan | 57–64 | Iran |

Xinzhuang Gymnasium, New Taipei

July 6

Report

| Chinese Taipei | 70–62 | Japan |

Xinzhuang Gymnasium, New Taipei

July 7

Report

| Lebanon (disqualified) | 79–72 | Japan |

Xinzhuang Gymnasium, New Taipei

July 7

Report

| Pro Basketball Alumni | 84–89 | Chinese Taipei |

Xinzhuang Gymnasium, New Taipei

July 7

Report

| Kuang-hua | 60–81 | South Korea |

Xinzhuang Gymnasium, New Taipei

July 7

Report

| Egypt | 89–65 | Jordan |

Xinzhuang Gymnasium, New Taipei

July 8

Report

| Japan | 59–64 | Egypt |

Xinzhuang Gymnasium, New Taipei

July 8

Report

| Iran | 77–64 | Kuang-hua |

Xinzhuang Gymnasium, New Taipei

July 8

Report

| South Korea | 85–79 | Pro Basketball Alumni |

Xinzhuang Gymnasium, New Taipei

July 8

Report

| Chinese Taipei | 63–83 | Lebanon (disqualified) |

Xinzhuang Gymnasium, New Taipei

July 9

Report

| Egypt | 54–90 | Iran |

Xinzhuang Gymnasium, New Taipei

July 9

Report

| Lebanon (disqualified) | 52–61 | South Korea |

Xinzhuang Gymnasium, New Taipei

July 9

Report

| Jordan | 61–91 | Chinese Taipei |

Xinzhuang Gymnasium, New Taipei

July 9

Report

| Kuang-hua | 69–101 | Pro Basketball Alumni |

Xinzhuang Gymnasium, New Taipei

July 10

Report

| Egypt | 64–62 | Lebanon (disqualified) |

Xinzhuang Gymnasium, New Taipei

July 10

Report

| Kuang-hua | 77–86 | Jordan |

Xinzhuang Gymnasium, New Taipei

July 10

Report

| Japan | 56–64 | Pro Basketball Alumni |

Xinzhuang Gymnasium, New Taipei

July 10

Report

| South Korea | 68–71 | Iran |

Xinzhuang Gymnasium, New Taipei

July 11

Report

| Jordan | 57–67 | South Korea |

Xinzhuang Gymnasium, New Taipei

July 11

Report

| Iran | 60–55 | Japan |

Xinzhuang Gymnasium, New Taipei

July 11

Report

| Kuang-hua | 89–90 | Chinese Taipei |

Xinzhuang Gymnasium, New Taipei

July 11

Report

| Pro Basketball Alumni | 88–83 | Egypt |

Xinzhuang Gymnasium, New Taipei

July 12

Report

| Lebanon (disqualified) | 67–69 | Jordan |

Xinzhuang Gymnasium, New Taipei

July 12

Report

| Pro Basketball Alumni | 62–86 | Iran |

Xinzhuang Gymnasium, New Taipei

July 12

Report

| Japan | 66–76 | South Korea |

Xinzhuang Gymnasium, New Taipei

July 12

Report

| Chinese Taipei | 62–72 | Egypt |

Xinzhuang Gymnasium, New Taipei

July 13

Report

| Lebanon (disqualified) | 66–109 | Pro Basketball Alumni |

Xinzhuang Gymnasium, New Taipei

July 13

Report

| Egypt | 81–69 | Kuang-hua |

Xinzhuang Gymnasium, New Taipei

July 13

Report

| Jordan | 74–65 | Japan |

Xinzhuang Gymnasium, New Taipei

July 13

Report

| Iran | 72–67 | Chinese Taipei |

Xinzhuang Gymnasium, New Taipei

July 14

Report

| Iran | 0–0 | Lebanon (disqualified) |

Xinzhuang Gymnasium, New Taipei

July 14

Report

| Japan | 96–81 | Kuang-hua |

Xinzhuang Gymnasium, New Taipei

July 14

Report

| Pro Basketball Alumni | 81–71 | Jordan |

Xinzhuang Gymnasium, New Taipei

July 14

Report

| Chinese Taipei | 73–60 | South Korea |

Xinzhuang Gymnasium, New Taipei

== Awards ==
2013 William Jones Cup

Iran
Fourth title
