= 2009 William Jones Cup =

Tournament information
- Location: Taipei
- Dates: M: 18–26 July; W: 12–16 July
- Host(s): Taiwan
- Teams: M: 9 W: 4

Final positions
- Champions: M: Iran; W: South Korea
- 1st runners-up: M: Jordan; W: Japan
- 2nd runners-up: M: Lebanon; W: Chinese Taipei

The 2009 William Jones Cup was the 31st tournament of the William Jones Cup that took place in Taipei from 12 July–26 July.

== Men ==
=== Standings ===
Team	Pld	W	L	PF	PA	PD	Pts	Tiebreaker	Tiebreaker
Iran	8	6	2	580	491	+89	14	2–1	1–0
Jordan	8	7	1	622	477	+145	14	2–1	0–1
Lebanon	8	6	2	676	609	+67	14	1–2	1–0
Chinese Taipei	8	6	2	638	655	–17	14	1–2	0–1
South Korea	8	5	3	639	657	–18	13		
Philippines	8	2	6	623	683	−60	10	1–0	
Chinese Taipei B	8	2	6	645	699	−54	10	0–1	
Kazakhstan	8	1	7	568	649	−81	9	1–0	
Japan	8	1	7	612	683	−71	9	0–1	

=== Results ===
July 18

Lebanon	93–61	Chinese Taipei B

Hsinchuang Gymnasium, Taipei

July 18

South Korea	75–73	Kazakhstan

Hsinchuang Gymnasium, Taipei

July 18

Jordan	90–59	Philippines

Hsinchuang Gymnasium, Taipei

July 18

Chinese Taipei	77–74	Japan

Hsinchuang Gymnasium, Taipei

July 19

Kazakhstan	56–79	Iran

Hsinchuang Gymnasium, Taipei

July 19

Japan	81–90	Lebanon

Hsinchuang Gymnasium, Taipei

July 19

Chinese Taipei B	93–101	South Korea

Hsinchuang Gymnasium, Taipei

July 19

Philippines	77–86	Chinese Taipei

Hsinchuang Gymnasium, Taipei

July 20

Lebanon	63–73	Jordan

Hsinchuang Gymnasium, Taipei

July 20

Philippines	85–67	Kazakhstan

Hsinchuang Gymnasium, Taipei

July 20

Iran	69–76	South Korea

Hsinchuang Gymnasium, Taipei

July 20

Chinese Taipei	87–74	Chinese Taipei B

Hsinchuang Gymnasium, Taipei

July 21

Kazakhstan	73–77	Lebanon

Hsinchuang Gymnasium, Taipei

July 21

Japan	87–85	Philippines

Hsinchuang Gymnasium, Taipei

July 21

Chinese Taipei B	79–88	Iran

Hsinchuang Gymnasium, Taipei

July 21

Jordan	111–64	Chinese Taipei

Hsinchuang Gymnasium, Taipei

July 22

Japan	70–82	Iran

Hsinchuang Gymnasium, Taipei

July 22

South Korea	67–83	Jordan

Hsinchuang Gymnasium, Taipei

July 22

Chinese Taipei B	69–82	Kazakhstan

Hsinchuang Gymnasium, Taipei

July 22

Lebanon	95–83	Philippines
Pts: Feghali 29		Pts: Helterbrand 12

Hsinchuang Gymnasium, Taipei

July 23

Kazakhstan	75–70	Japan

Hsinchuang Gymnasium, Taipei

July 23

Iran	20–0	Jordan

Hsinchuang Gymnasium, Taipei

July 23

Philippines	80–83	South Korea

Hsinchuang Gymnasium, Taipei

July 23

Chinese Taipei	78–91	Lebanon

Hsinchuang Gymnasium, Taipei

July 24

Jordan	76–69	Chinese Taipei B

Hsinchuang Gymnasium, Taipei

July 24

South Korea	84–81	Japan

Hsinchuang Gymnasium, Taipei

July 24

Iran	81–70	Lebanon

Hsinchuang Gymnasium, Taipei

July 24

Chinese Taipei	85–78	Kazakhstan

Hsinchuang Gymnasium, Taipei

July 25

Japan	58–93	Jordan

Hsinchuang Gymnasium, Taipei

July 25

Chinese Taipei B	90–94	Philippines
Pts: Chang 24		Pts: Miller 22

Hsinchuang Gymnasium, Taipei

July 25

Lebanon	97–79	South Korea

Hsinchuang Gymnasium, Taipei

July 25

Iran	76–80	Chinese Taipei

Hsinchuang Gymnasium, Taipei

July 26

Chinese Taipei B	97–91	Japan

Hsinchuang Gymnasium, Taipei

July 26

Iran	85–60	Philippines

Hsinchuang Gymnasium, Taipei

July 26

Chinese Taipei	81–74	South Korea

Hsinchuang Gymnasium, Taipei

July 26

Jordan	96–77	Kazakhstan

Hsinchuang Gymnasium, Taipei

== Women ==
=== Preliminary round ===
Team	Pld	W	L	PF	PA	PD	Pts
South Korea	3	3	0	253	179	+74	6
Japan	3	2	1	222	182	+40	5
Chinese Taipei	3	1	2	213	179	+34	4
Malaysia	3	0	3	148	296	–148	3

July 12

South Korea	79–74	Japan

Hsinchuang Gymnasium, Taipei

July 12

Chinese Taipei	102–51	Malaysia

Hsinchuang Gymnasium, Taipei

July 13

Malaysia	54–107	South Korea

Hsinchuang Gymnasium, Taipei

July 13

Japan	61–60	Chinese Taipei

Hsinchuang Gymnasium, Taipei

July 14

Japan	87–43	Malaysia

Hsinchuang Gymnasium, Taipei

July 14

Chinese Taipei	51–67	South Korea

Hsinchuang Gymnasium, Taipei

=== Knockout round ===
Semi-finals
July 15 – Hsinchuang Gymnasium
South Korea	84
Malaysia	65
July 15 – Hsinchuang Gymnasium
Japan	58
Chinese Taipei	70

Final
July 16 – Hsinchuang Gymnasium
South Korea	67
Chinese Taipei	48
Third place
July 16 – Hsinchuang Gymnasium
Malaysia	40
Japan	85
