= 2001 William Jones Cup =

Tournament information
- Dates: 17–25 August 2001
- Host: Taiwan
- Teams: 8

Final positions
- Champion: Taiwan
- 1st runner-up: South Korea
- 2nd runner-up: Lokomotiv Novosibirsk

The 2001 William Jones Cup (24th tournament) took place in Taiwan. Chinese Taipei won its first title since the first edition of the tournament 24 years ago.

== Standings ==
Team	Pld	W	L
Taiwan	7	7	0
South Korea	7	6	1
(Russia) Lokomotiv Novosibirsk	7	5	2
(Philippines) FedEx-Laguna Lakers	7	4	3
Honduras	7	3	4
(Canada) Victoria University	7	5	2
Mongolia	7	1	6
South Africa	7	0	7

== Results ==
17 August

Report

Taiwan	100–57	South Africa

17 August

Report

South Korea	118–70	Mongolia

18 August

Report

Taiwan	109–78	Mongolia

18 August

Report

Honduras	82–61	South Africa

18 August

Report

(Philippines) FedEx-Laguna Lakers	82–72	(Canada) Victoria University

19 August

Report

Taiwan	84–79	(Philippines) FedEx-Laguna Lakers

19 August

Report

South Korea	76–71	Honduras

19 August

Report

(Russia) Lokomotiv Novosibirsk	82–45	South Africa

20 August

Report

Taiwan	W–L	(Canada) Victoria University

20 August

Report

(Philippines) FedEx-Laguna Lakers	97–70	Mongolia

20 August

Report

(Russia) Lokomotiv Novosibirsk	86–84	Honduras

21 August

Report

(Russia) Lokomotiv Novosibirsk	103–73	Mongolia

21 August

Report

(Philippines) FedEx-Laguna Lakers	95–67	South Africa

21 August

Report

South Korea	92–65	(Canada) Victoria University

22 August

Report

(Canada) Victoria University	97–64	Mongolia

22 August

Report

South Korea	97–88	(Philippines) FedEx-Laguna Lakers

22 August

Report

Taiwan	90–77	Honduras

23 August

Report

Taiwan	87–77	(Russia) Lokomotiv Novosibirsk

23 August

Report

Honduras	92–81	Mongolia

23 August

Report

(Canada) Victoria University	85–60	South Africa

24 August

Report

South Korea	83–80	(Russia) Lokomotiv Novosibirsk

24 August

Report

(Philippines) FedEx-Laguna Lakers	90–85	Honduras

24 August

Report

Mongolia Victoria University	93–87	South Africa

25 August

Report

(Canada) Victoria University	67–70	Honduras

25 August

Report

(Philippines) FedEx-Laguna Lakers	71–81	(Russia) Lokomotiv Novosibirsk

25 August

Report

Taiwan	69–58	South Korea

Attendance: 10,000

== Awards ==
2001 William Jones Cup Men's Tournament

Taiwan
First title

Most Valuable Player
(Taiwan) Chen Chih-chung
