= 2002 William Jones Cup =

Tournament information
- Dates: 18–22 July 2002
- Host(s): Taiwan
- Teams: 8

Final positions
- Champion: Great Mates

The 2002 William Jones Cup was the 25th staging of William Jones Cup, an international basketball tournament to be held at the Taiwan.

== Standings ==
Team	Pld	W	L
(Australia) Great Mates	6	5	1
(Canada) University of Alberta Golden Bears	5	4	1
(China) Sina Lions	6	4	2
(Russia) Lokomotiv Novosibirsk	6	3	3
Japan	5	2	3
(Philippines) Metropolitan Basketball Association All Stars	5	2	3
South Korea Military	5	1	4
Republic of China	6	1	5
