= 1965 ABC Championship =

1965 FIBA Asia Cup
3rd Asian Basketball Championship

Tournament details
- Host country: Malaysia
- Dates: November 28 – December 11
- Teams: 10 (from all Asian confederations)
- Venue(s): 1 (in 1 host city)

Final positions
- Champions: Japan (1st title)

The 1965 Asian Basketball Confederation Championship for Men were held in Kuala Lumpur, Malaysia.

== Preliminary round ==
=== Group A ===
Team	Pld	W	L	PF	PA	PD	Pts
Philippines	4	4	0	348	196	+152	8
Japan	4	3	1	288	234	+54	7
Malaysia	4	2	2	258	282	−24	6
South Vietnam	4	1	3	263	318	−55	5
Singapore	4	0	4	219	346	−127	4

November 28
20:00

Philippines	82–53	Malaysia
Scoring by half: 38–17, 44–36

Stadium Negara, Kuala Lumpur

November 29
19:30

Singapore	42–79	Japan
Scoring by half: 16–44, 26–35

Stadium Negara, Kuala Lumpur

November 29
21:00

Malaysia	72–65	South Vietnam
Scoring by half: 35–33, 37–32

Stadium Negara, Kuala Lumpur

November 30
16:30

Japan	91–67	South Vietnam
Scoring by half: 45–32, 46–35

Stadium Negara, Kuala Lumpur

November 30
19:30

Philippines	104–39	Singapore
Scoring by half: 51–19, 53–20

Stadium Negara, Kuala Lumpur

December 1
18:00

Singapore	71–82	Malaysia
Scoring by half: 27–42, 44–40

Stadium Negara, Kuala Lumpur

December 1
21:00

South Vietnam	50–88	Philippines
Scoring by half: 18–38, 32–50

Stadium Negara, Kuala Lumpur

December 2
16:30

Singapore	67–81	South Vietnam
Scoring by half: 30–40, 37–41

Stadium Negara, Kuala Lumpur

December 2
19:30

Philippines	74–54	Japan
Scoring by half: 34–31, 40–23

Stadium Negara, Kuala Lumpur

December 4
19:30

Japan	64–51	Malaysia
Scoring by half: 38–28, 26–23

Stadium Negara, Kuala Lumpur

=== Group B ===
Team	Pld	W	L	PF	PA	PD	Pts
Taiwan	4	4	0	336	232	+104	8
South Korea	4	3	1	320	264	+56	7
Thailand	4	2	2	292	272	+20	6
India	4	1	3	241	344	−103	5
Hong Kong	4	0	4	232	309	−77	4

November 29
18:00

South Korea	104–64	India
Scoring by half: 55–30, 49–34

Stadium Negara, Kuala Lumpur

November 30
15:00

India	58–98	Taiwan
Scoring by half: 26–54, 32–44

Stadium Negara, Kuala Lumpur

November 30
21:00

Hong Kong	49–85	South Korea
Scoring by half: 26–54, 23–31

Stadium Negara, Kuala Lumpur

December 1
19:30

India	58–55	Hong Kong
Scoring by half: 22–28, 36–27

Stadium Negara, Kuala Lumpur

December 2
15:00

Hong Kong	62–77	Taiwan
Scoring by half: 25–35, 37–42

Stadium Negara, Kuala Lumpur

December 2
21:00

Thailand	66–69	South Korea
Scoring by half: 39–38, 27–31

Stadium Negara, Kuala Lumpur

December 3
18:00

Taiwan	76–50	Thailand
Scoring by half: 31–29, 45–21

Stadium Negara, Kuala Lumpur

December 4
18:00

Hong Kong	66–89	Thailand
Scoring by half: 31–54, 35–35

Stadium Negara, Kuala Lumpur

December 4
21:00

Taiwan	85–62	South Korea
Scoring by half: 42–29, 43–33

Stadium Negara, Kuala Lumpur

December 5
9:00

Thailand	87–61	India
Scoring by half: 47–35, 40–26

Stadium Negara, Kuala Lumpur

== Final round ==
=== Classification 7th–10th ===
Team	Pld	W	L	PF	PA	PD	Pts
India	3	3	0	250	198	+52	6
Hong Kong	3	2	1	223	213	+10	5
Singapore	3	1	2	238	276	−38	4
South Vietnam	3	0	3	241	265	−24	3

December 5
18:00

South Vietnam	80–84 (OT)	Hong Kong
Scoring by half: 42–32, 28–38 Overtime: 10–14

Stadium Negara, Kuala Lumpur

December 6
14:00

Singapore	93–85	South Vietnam
Scoring by half: 40–37, 53–48

Stadium Negara, Kuala Lumpur

December 6
18:30

Hong Kong	50–60	India
Scoring by half: 20–17, 30–43

Stadium Negara, Kuala Lumpur

December 8
14:00

India	102–72	Singapore
Scoring by half: 45–44, 57–28

Stadium Negara, Kuala Lumpur

December 9
18:00

Singapore	73–89	Hong Kong
Scoring by half: 42–45, 31–44

Stadium Negara, Kuala Lumpur

December 10
18:00

South Vietnam	76–88	India
Scoring by half: 38–43, 38–45

Stadium Negara, Kuala Lumpur

=== Championship ===
Team	Pld	W	L	PF	PA	PD	Pts
Japan	5	5	0	355	301	+54	10
Philippines	5	4	1	385	337	+48	9
South Korea	5	3	2	326	308	+18	8
Thailand	5	2	3	350	364	−14	7
Taiwan	5	1	4	353	372	−19	6
Malaysia	5	0	5	313	400	−87	5

December 5
19:30

Malaysia	55–77	Japan
Scoring by half: 24–34, 31–43

Stadium Negara, Kuala Lumpur

December 5
21:00

Philippines	59–50	South Korea
Scoring by half: 21–28, 38–22

Stadium Negara, Kuala Lumpur

December 6
15:30

Philippines	90–72	Malaysia
Scoring by half: 56–34, 34–38

Stadium Negara, Kuala Lumpur

December 6
20:00

South Korea	78–66	Thailand
Scoring by half: 47–30, 31–36

Stadium Negara, Kuala Lumpur

December 6
21:30

Japan	73–58	Taiwan
Scoring by half: 34–35, 39–23

Stadium Negara, Kuala Lumpur

December 7
18:00

Thailand	86–71	Malaysia
Scoring by half: 38–25, 48–46

Stadium Negara, Kuala Lumpur

December 7
19:30

Taiwan	65–67	South Korea
Scoring by half: 33–39, 32–28

Stadium Negara, Kuala Lumpur

December 7
21:00

Japan	71–65	Philippines
Scoring by half: 37–31, 34–34

Stadium Negara, Kuala Lumpur

December 8
15:30

Thailand	74–71	Taiwan
Scoring by half: 39–39, 35–32

Stadium Negara, Kuala Lumpur

December 9
19:30

South Korea	68–49	Malaysia
Scoring by half: 26–25, 42–24

Stadium Negara, Kuala Lumpur

December 9
21:00

Japan	65–60	Thailand
Scoring by half: 33–31, 32–29

Stadium Negara, Kuala Lumpur

December 10
19:30

Taiwan	79–66	Malaysia
Scoring by half: 38–34, 41–32

Stadium Negara, Kuala Lumpur

December 10
21:00

Philippines	79–64	Thailand
Scoring by half: 46–29, 33–35

Stadium Negara, Kuala Lumpur

December 11
19:00

South Korea	63–69	Japan
Scoring by half: 22–31, 41–38

Stadium Negara, Kuala Lumpur

December 11
20:30

Philippines	92–80	Taiwan
Scoring by half: 45–35, 47–45

Stadium Negara, Kuala Lumpur

== Final standings ==
Qualified for the 1967 FIBA World Championship

Rank	Team	Record
1st place, gold medalist(s)	Japan	8–1
2nd place, silver medalist(s)	Philippines	8–1
3rd place, bronze medalist(s)	South Korea	6–3
4	Thailand	4–5
5	Taiwan	5–4
6	Malaysia	2–7
7	India	4–3
8	Hong Kong	2–5
9	Singapore	1–6
10	South Vietnam	1–6

== Awards ==
1965 Asian champions

Japan
First title
