= Athletes in Action =

American sports organization

Athletes In Action
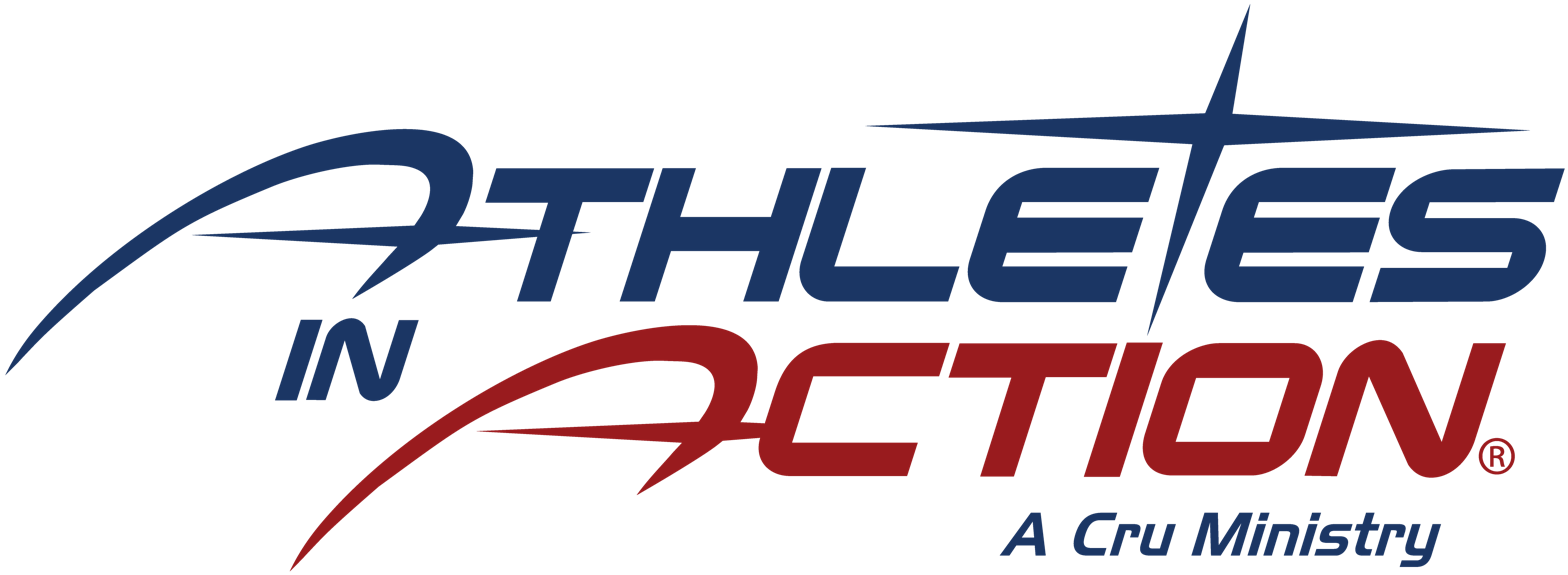
- Abbreviation: AIA
- Formation: 1966
- Founder: Dave Hannah
- Type: Non-profit
- Headquarters: Xenia, Ohio, US
- President: Mark Householder
- Parent organization: Cru
- Website: www.athletesinaction.org

Athletes in Action (AIA) is an American sports organization founded in 1966. It is the sports ministry of Cru Ministries, formerly known as Campus Crusade for Christ.

== History ==
Athletes in Action was started in 1966 by Dave Hannah.

== Participation in international tournaments ==
The core of the United States national basketball team that participated at the 1978 FIBA World Championship was composed by players from Athletes in Action. Athletes in Action has also participated at the William Jones Cup, an international basketball tournament held in Taiwan which featured both national teams and club sides. The Eastern Unit of the AIA won the 1977 edition besting second placers, the Eastern Washington Eagles and third placers Flying Camel of Taiwan. AIA also won the 2006 edition with the Chinese Taipei and Qatar national basketball teams finishing second and third respectively.
