= 2014 William Jones Cup =

Annual basketball tournament held in Asia

Tournament information
- Location: Taipei
- Dates: M: 29 August–6 September 2015; W: ?–?
- Host(s): Taiwan
- Teams: M: 9 W: ?
- Website: 2014 William Jones Cup (in Chinese)

Final positions
- Champions: M: Ulsan Mobis Phoebus; W: Canada
- 1st runners-up: M: Chinese Taipei A W: DENSO Iris
- 2nd runners-up: M: Egypt; W: South Korea
- MVP: M: Ricardo Ratliffe (Ulsan Mobis Phoebus)

The 2014 William Jones Cup was the 36th William Jones Cup, a top-level international basketball tournament of FIBA Asia. The tournament was held in Taiwan from 9–17 August 2014.

== Men's tournament ==
=== Preliminary round ===
Team	Pld	W	L	PF	PA	PD	Pts	Tie
Egypt	7	5	2	526	468	+58	12	3–0
Chinese Taipei A (Blue)	7	5	2	575	545	+30	12	1–2; 1–1; 1.05
(United States) Overtake USA Pro Select	7	5	2	571	565	+6	12	1–2; 1–1; 1.01
(South Korea) Ulsan Mobis Phoebus	7	5	2	578	560	+18	12	1–2; 1–1; 0.95
Jordan	7	4	3	492	471	+21	11	
Chinese Taipei B (White)	7	2	5	505	555	−50	9	1–0
Iran B	7	2	5	490	510	−20	9	0–1
Japan	7	0	7	505	588	−83	7	

- Four-way tie for first determined by head-to-head results amongst tied teams. Egypt defeated the other three teams.
- The other three teams were again ranked via head-to-head records; all team had beaten each other at least once. The tie was subsequently broken by goal average.

All times in UTC+8.

==== Day 1 ====
August 9
13:00

Report

Iran B	64–70	(United States) Overtake USA Pro Select
Scoring by quarter: 15–15, 13–26, 16–10, 20–19

Taipei PE College Gym, Taipei

August 9
15:00

Report

Ulsan Mobis Phoebus (South Korea)	78–80	Egypt
Scoring by quarter: 21–24, 19–10, 21–24, 17–22

Taipei PE College Gym, Taipei

August 9
17:00

Report

Jordan	71–62	Chinese Taipei B
Scoring by quarter: 16–18, 15–9, 23–17, 17–18

Taipei PE College Gym, Taipei

August 9
19:00

Report

Chinese Taipei A	88–77	Japan
Scoring by quarter: 15–20, 20–15, 28–23, 25–19

Taipei PE College Gym, Taipei

==== Day 2 ====
August 10
13:00

Report

Egypt	61–74	Jordan
Scoring by quarter: 14–25, 11–11, 20–18, 16–20

Taipei PE College Gym, Taipei

August 10
15:00

Report

Chinese Taipei B	84–87	(South Korea) Ulsan Mobis Phoebus
Scoring by quarter: 16–16, 21–24, 22–29, 25–18

Taipei PE College Gym, Taipei

August 10
17:00

Report

Japan	72–79 (OT)	Iran B
Scoring by quarter: 21–14, 9–17, 16–15, 15–15, Overtime: 11–18

Taipei PE College Gym, Taipei

August 10
19:00

Report

Overtake USA Pro Select (United States)	70–85	Chinese Taipei A
Scoring by quarter: 22–16, 10–22, 21–18, 17–29

Taipei PE College Gym, Taipei

==== Day 3 ====
August 11
13:00

Report

Iran B	65–62	Egypt
Scoring by quarter: 17–18, 13–11, 22–13, 13–20

Taipei PE College Gym, Taipei

August 11
15:00

Report

Jordan	81–63	Japan
Scoring by quarter: 15–13, 21–19, 25–7, 20–24

Taipei PE College Gym, Taipei

August 11
17:00

Report

Ulsan Mobis Phoebus (South Korea)	77–93	(United States) Overtake USA Pro Select
Scoring by quarter: 24–25, 14–16, 20–28, 19–24

Taipei PE College Gym, Taipei

August 11
19:00

Report

Chinese Taipei A	84–80	Chinese Taipei B
Scoring by quarter: 23–23, 14–20, 21–27, 26–10

Taipei PE College Gym, Taipei

==== Day 4 ====
August 12
13:00

Report

Chinese Taipei B	85–75	Iran B
Scoring by quarter: 23–28, 20–14, 19–21, 23–12

Taipei PE College Gym, Taipei

August 12
15:00

Report

Overtake USA Pro Select (United States)	86–79	Jordan
Scoring by quarter: 14–15, 25–21, 17–24, 30–19

Taipei PE College Gym, Taipei

August 12
17:00

Report

Japan	87–102	(South Korea) Ulsan Mobis Phoebus
Scoring by quarter: 22–15, 17–27, 29–26, 19–34

Taipei PE College Gym, Taipei

August 12
19:00

Report

Egypt	69–61	Chinese Taipei A
Scoring by quarter: 20–11, 11–14, 18–22, 20–14

Taipei PE College Gym, Taipei

==== Day 5 ====
August 13
13:00

Report

Chinese Taipei B	79–69	Japan
Scoring by quarter: 20–22, 17–14, 19–10, 23–23

Taipei PE College Gym, Taipei

August 13
15:00

Report

Egypt	102–76	(United States) Overtake USA Pro Select
Scoring by quarter: 34–15, 23–13, 30–26, 15–22

Taipei PE College Gym, Taipei

August 13
17:00

Report

Ulsan Mobis Phoebus (South Korea)	74–69	Iran B
Scoring by quarter: 17–14, 19–17, 20–22, 18–16

Taipei PE College Gym, Taipei

August 13
19:00

Report

Chinese Taipei A	78–72	Jordan
Scoring by quarter: 21–5, 15–20, 18–25, 24–22

Taipei PE College Gym, Taipei

==== Day 6 ====
August 14
13:00

report

Japan	55–69	Egypt
Scoring by quarter: 11–21, 11–14, 16–17, 17–17

Taipei PE College Gym, Taipei

August 14
15:00

report

Overtake USA Pro Select (United States)	86–56	Chinese Taipei B
Scoring by quarter: 21–16, 23–14, 13–15, 29–11

Taipei PE College Gym, Taipei

August 14
17:00

report

Jordan	52–59	(South Korea) Ulsan Mobis Phoebus
Scoring by quarter: 15–18, 12–16, 13–10, 12–15

Taipei PE College Gym, Taipei

August 14
19:00

report

Iran B	76–84	Chinese Taipei A
Scoring by quarter: 24–17, 11–27, 22–20, 19–20

Taipei PE College Gym, Taipei

==== Day 7 ====
August 15
13:00

Report

Egypt	83–59	Chinese Taipei B
Scoring by quarter: 20–15, 19–8, 19–16, 25–20

Taipei PE College Gym, Taipei

August 15
15:00

Report

Jordan	63–62	Iran B
Scoring by quarter: 10–13, 17–10, 18–20, 18–19

Taipei PE College Gym, Taipei

August 15
17:00

Report

Overtake USA Pro Select (United States)	90–72	Japan
Scoring by quarter: 25–12, 26–18, 21–21, 18–21

Taipei PE College Gym, Taipei

August 15
19:00

Report

Chinese Taipei A	95–101	(South Korea) Ulsan Mobis Phoebus
Scoring by quarter: 16–29, 23–24, 36–31, 20–17

Taipei PE College Gym, Taipei

=== Classification round ===
Semi-finals
16 August
Jordan	64
Japan	80
16 August
Chinese Taipei B	97
Iran B	92

Fifth place
17 August
Japan	71
Chinese Taipei B (OT)	73
Seventh place
17 August
Jordan	79
Iran B	84

==== Semifinals ====
August 16
17:00

Jordan	64–80	Japan
Scoring by quarter: 12–15, 11–19, 20–23, 21–23

Taipei PE College Gym, Taipei

August 16
19:00

Iran B	92–97	Chinese Taipei B
Scoring by quarter: 17–16, 25–24, 19–29, 31–28

Taipei PE College Gym, Taipei

==== Seventh place playoff ====
August 17
17:00

Jordan	79–84	Iran B
Scoring by quarter: 16–15, 19–16, 19–22, 25–31

Taipei PE College Gym, Taipei

==== Fifth place playoff ====
August 17
17:00

Japan	71–73 (OT)	Chinese Taipei B
Scoring by quarter: 19–16, 13–14, 14–20, 18–14, Overtime: 7–9

Taipei PE College Gym, Taipei

=== Final round ===
Semi-finals
16 August
Egypt	64
(South Korea) Ulsan Mobis Phoebus	73
16 August
Chinese Taipei A	96
(United States) Overtake USA Pro Select	86

Final
17 August
(South Korea) Ulsan Mobis Phoebus	83
Chinese Taipei A	79
Third place
17 August
Egypt	81
(United States) Overtake USA Pro Select	78

==== Semifinals ====
August 16
17:00

Ulsan Mobis Phoebus (South Korea)	73–64	Egypt
Scoring by quarter: 22–12, 14–22, 15–23, 22–7

Taipei PE College Gym, Taipei

August 16
19:00

Chinese Taipei A	96–86	(United States) Overtake USA Pro Select
Scoring by quarter: 21–13, 29–27, 16–21, 30–25

Taipei PE College Gym, Taipei

==== Third place playoff ====
August 17
17:00

Egypt	81–78	(United States) Overtake USA Pro Select
Scoring by quarter: 14–24, 22–21, 24–13, 21–20

Taipei PE College Gym, Taipei

==== Final ====
August 17
17:00

Ulsan Mobis Phoebus (South Korea)	83–79	Chinese Taipei A
Scoring by quarter: 23–17, 18–14, 11–24, 31–24

Taipei PE College Gym, Taipei

== Awards ==
2014 William Jones Cup
(South Korea)
Ulsan Mobis Phoebus
First title
