= Charlie Parker (basketball) =

American basketball coach

Personal information
- Born: December 25, 1948 (age 77)

Career information
- College: Findlay (?–1972); Bowling Green State (1972–1974)
- Coaching career: 1972–present

Career history

Coaching
- 1972–1976: Findlay (assistant)
- 1976–1982: Bowling Green State (assistant)
- 1982–1988: Wayne State
- 1988–1994: Southern California (assistant)
- 1994–1996: Southern California
- 1996–2005: Dallas Mavericks (assistant)
- 2006–2010: New Orleans Hornets (assistant)
- 2010–2011: Foshan Dralions (assistant)
- 2011–2013: Al-Muharraq
- 2013–2014: Texas Legends (assistant)
- 2014–2015: Gunma Crane Thunders
- 2016–2017: Chinese Taipei Universiade
- 2018–2022: Chinese Taipei

Charles Henry Parker (born December 25, 1948) is an American basketball coach, formerly the head coach for Taiwan men's national basketball team in FIBA Asia.

== Coaching career ==
Parker was head coach for Taiwan's national basketball team from 2018 to 2022. Parker was an assistant coach for the New Orleans Hornets from 2006 to 2010. His previous coaching position was at the Dallas Mavericks, where he was an assistant coach for ten seasons (1996–2005). Prior to that, he coached the USC Trojans. Parker was head coach at Wayne State from 1982 to 1988. Prior to that, he coached at Bowling Green and his alma mater, University of Findlay.

== Head coaching record ==
Legend
Regular season	G	Games coached	W	Games won	L	Games lost	W–L %	Win–loss %
Playoffs	PG	Playoff games	PW	Playoff wins	PL	Playoff losses	PW–L %	Playoff win–loss %

Team	Year	G	W	L	W–L%	Finish	PG	PW	PL	PW–L%	Result
Gunma Crane Thunders	2014–15	52	19	33	.365	8th in Eastern	2	0	2	.000	Lost in 1st round
