= 2010 William Jones Cup =

Tournament information
- Location: Taipei
- Dates: M: July 14–20; W: July 15–17
- Host(s): Taiwan
- Teams: M: 7 W: 4

Final positions
- Champions: M: Iran; W: Sinsegae Coolcat
- 1st runners-up: M: Lebanon; W: Chinese Taipei
- 2nd runners-up: M: Japan; W: University All-Stars

The 2010 William Jones Cup was the 32nd tournament which took place in Taipei from July 14–20.

== Men ==
=== Standings ===
Team	Pld	W	L	PF	PA	PD	Pts
Iran	6	6	0	510	413	+97	12
Lebanon	6	5	1	501	425	+76	11
Japan	6	4	2	513	459	+54	10
(Philippines) Smart Gilas	6	3	3	473	447	+26	9
Chinese Taipei	6	2	4	521	494	+27	8
University All-Stars	6	1	5	402	510	−108	7
Australia	6	0	6	371	543	−172	6

=== Results ===
July 14

Smart Gilas (Philippines)	83–52	University All-Stars

Hsinchuang Gymnasium, Taipei

July 14

Lebanon	87–82	Japan

Hsinchuang Gymnasium, Taipei

July 14

Chinese Taipei	103–55	Australia

Hsinchuang Gymnasium, Taipei

July 15

Iran	81–68	(Philippines) Smart Gilas

Hsinchuang Gymnasium, Taipei

July 15

Australia	69–97	Japan

Hsinchuang Gymnasium, Taipei

July 15

Chinese Taipei	74–64	University All-Stars

Hsinchuang Gymnasium, Taipei

July 16

Japan	73–77	Iran

Hsinchuang Gymnasium, Taipei

July 16

Australia	64–90	(Philippines) Smart Gilas

Hsinchuang Gymnasium, Taipei

July 16

Chinese Taipei	84–93	Lebanon

Hsinchuang Gymnasium, Taipei

July 17

University All-Stars	88–77	Australia

Hsinchuang Gymnasium, Taipei

July 17

Lebanon	71–79	Iran

Hsinchuang Gymnasium, Taipei

July 17

Japan	94–85	Chinese Taipei

Hsinchuang Gymnasium, Taipei

July 18

University All-Stars	66–96	Lebanon

Hsinchuang Gymnasium, Taipei

July 18

Australia	54–84	Iran

Hsinchuang Gymnasium, Taipei

July 18

Chinese Taipei	93–96 (OT)	(Philippines) Smart Gilas

Hsinchuang Gymnasium, Taipei

July 19

Lebanon	81–52	Australia

Hsinchuang Gymnasium, Taipei

July 19

Smart Gilas (Philippines)	74–84	Japan

Hsinchuang Gymnasium, Taipei

July 19

University All-Stars	65–97	Iran

Hsinchuang Gymnasium, Taipei

July 20

Lebanon	73–62	(Philippines) Smart Gilas

Hsinchuang Gymnasium, Taipei

July 20

University All-Stars	67–83	Japan

Hsinchuang Gymnasium, Taipei

July 20

Iran	92–82	Chinese Taipei

Hsinchuang Gymnasium, Taipei

=== All-tournament team ===
- (Chinese Taipei) Lee Hsueh-lin
- (Japan) Yuta Tabuse
- (Iran) Samad Nikkhah Bahrami (MVP)
- (Japan) Takuya Kawamura
- (Philippines) Marcus Douthit

== Women ==
=== Preliminary round ===
Team	Pld	W	L	PF	PA	PD	Pts
Sinsegae Coolcat	3	3	0	293	189	+104	6
Chinese Taipei	3	2	1	302	173	+129	5
University All-Stars	3	1	2	284	235	+49	4
Kazakhstan	3	0	3	124	406	−282	3

July 15

University All-Stars	71–88	Sinsegae Coolcat

Hsinchuang Gymnasium, Taipei

July 15

Kazakhstan	29–132	Chinese Taipei

Hsinchuang Gymnasium, Taipei

July 16

Sinsegae Coolcat	125–40	Kazakhstan

Hsinchuang Gymnasium, Taipei

July 16

Chinese Taipei	92–64	University All-Stars

Hsinchuang Gymnasium, Taipei

July 17

Kazakhstan	55–149	University All-Stars

Hsinchuang Gymnasium, Taipei

July 17

Sinsegae Coolcat	80–78	Chinese Taipei

Hsinchuang Gymnasium, Taipei

=== Knockout round ===
Semi-finals
July 18 – Hsinchuang Gymnasium
Sinsegae Coolcat	106
Kazakhstan	33
July 18 – Hsinchuang Gymnasium
Chinese Taipei	103
University All-Stars	38

Final
July 19 – Hsinchuang Gymnasium
Sinsegae Coolcat	80
Chinese Taipei	68
Third place
July 19 – Hsinchuang Gymnasium
Kazakhstan	39
University All-Stars	118

=== All-tournament team ===
- (Chinese Taipei) Liu Chun-yi
- (South Korea) Kim Na-Youn (MVP)
- (Kazakhstan) Darya Li
- (Chinese Taipei) Wen Chi
- (South Korea) Park Ha-Na
