= 1963 ABC Championship =

2nd Asian Men's Basketball Championship

1963 FIBA Asia Cup
2nd Asian Basketball Championship

Tournament details
- Host country: Taiwan
- Dates: November 20 – December 3
- Teams: 8 (from all Asian confederations)
- Venue: 1 (in 1 host city)

Final positions
- Champions: Philippines (2nd title)

The 1963 ABC Championship was the second edition of the ABC Championship, a tournament which was held by FIBA Asia since 1960. The tournament which was held at thee then-newly constructed Chung-Hua Gymnasium in Taipei, Taiwan saw eight teams compete (an expansion of one team) in a round-robin tournament with the top four teams qualifying through to the championship round where they played each other again one more time. The bottom four teams would compete in a classification round.

The tournament saw the first tie-breaker matches to be played with Thailand defeating Malaya to book a spot in the championship round. In the championship round, the Philippines and Taiwan finish level with an 8–2 record.

This meant that a play-off to decide the champion was played on December 3. In that final match, the Philippines would claim their second title, defeating Taiwan, 91–77. Third was South Korea, who had defeated the play-off teams at least once during the tournament.

== Preliminary round ==
Team	Pld	W	L	PF	PA	PD	Pts
Philippines	7	6	1	649	406	+243	13
Taiwan	7	6	1	695	535	+160	13
South Korea	7	5	2	649	496	+153	12
Thailand	7	4	3	581	542	+39	11
Malaya	7	4	3	548	568	−20	11
Singapore	7	2	5	516	662	−146	9
Hong Kong	7	1	6	479	610	−131	8
South Vietnam	7	0	7	538	836	−298	7

November 20

Singapore	80–73	Hong Kong
Scoring by half: 28–35, 52–38

Taipei

November 21

South Vietnam	89–98	Singapore
Scoring by half: 40–49, 49–49

Taipei

November 21

Malaya	81–80	South Korea
Scoring by half: 32–38, 49–42

Taipei

November 21

Thailand	60–83	Philippines
Scoring by half: 26–36, 34–47

Taipei

November 22

Singapore	65–74	Thailand
Scoring by half: 32–43, 33–31

Taipei

November 22

South Vietnam	61–124	Philippines
Scoring by half: 53–35, 71–26

Taipei

November 22

South Korea	90–61	Hong Kong
Scoring by half: 38–28, 52–33

Taipei

November 22

Taiwan	100–76	Malaya
Scoring by half: 33–26, 67–50

Taipei

November 23

Hong Kong	105–75	South Vietnam
Scoring by half: 49–34, 56–41

Taipei

November 23

Malaya	42–103	Philippines
Scoring by half: 22–48, 20–55

Taipei

November 23

South Korea	110–55	Singapore
Scoring by half: 49–25, 61–30

Taipei

November 23

Thailand	87–96	Taiwan
Scoring by half: 42–45, 45–51

Taipei

November 24

Thailand	68–66	Malaya
Scoring by half: 32–27, 36–39

Taipei

November 24

Singapore	64–114	Philippines
Scoring by half: 24–48, 40–66

Taipei

November 24

South Vietnam	75–136	South Korea
Scoring by half: 64–36, 72–39

Taipei

November 24

Hong Kong	46–102	Taiwan
Scoring by half: 54–21, 48–25

Taipei

November 25

Taiwan	145–91	South Vietnam
Scoring by half: 72–40, 73–51

Taipei

November 26

Singapore	72–111	Malaya
Scoring by half: 31–54, 41–57

Taipei

November 26

South Vietnam	75–131	Thailand
Scoring by half: 32–65, 43–66

Taipei

November 26

Philippines	96–52	Hong Kong
Scoring by half: 47–27, 49–25

Taipei

November 26

South Korea	83–96	Taiwan
Scoring by half: 39–42, 44–54

Taipei

November 27

Taiwan	91–82	Singapore
Scoring by half: 43–32, 48–50

Taipei

November 27

Malaya	97–72	South Vietnam
Scoring by half: 45–30, 52–42

Taipei

November 27

Hong Kong	69–92	Thailand
Scoring by half: 36–45, 33–47

Taipei

November 27

Philippines	59–62	South Korea
Scoring by half: 24–25, 35–37

Taipei

November 28

Hong Kong	73–75	Malaya
Scoring by half: 27–26, 46–49

Taipei

November 28

South Korea	88–69	Thailand
Scoring by half: 32–40, 56–29

Taipei

November 28

Taiwan	65–70	Philippines
Scoring by half: 35–31, 30–39

Taipei

- Since both Thailand and Malaya were tied on points, a play-off game was required to determine the fourth-placed team.

November 29

Thailand	86–81	Malaya
Scoring by half: 45–41, 41–40

Taipei

== Final round ==
- The results and the points of the preliminary round shall be taken into account for the second round.

=== Classification 5th–8th ===
Team	Pld	W	L	PF	PA	PD	Pts
Malaya	10	6	4	823	842	−19	16
Hong Kong	10	4	6	744	820	−76	14
Singapore	10	3	7	769	919	−150	13
South Vietnam	10	0	10	795	1145	−350	10

November 30

South Vietnam	85–112	Malaya
Scoring by half: 40–51, 45–61

Taipei

November 30

Singapore	65–67	Hong Kong
Scoring by half: 28–27, 37–40

Taipei

December 1

South Vietnam	87–91	Singapore
Scoring by half: 53–45, 38–42

Taipei

December 1

Malaya	60–92	Hong Kong
Scoring by half: 29–40, 31–52

Taipei

December 2

Hong Kong	105–85	South Vietnam
Scoring by half: 46–40, 60–45

Taipei

December 2

Malaya	103–97	Singapore
Scoring by half: 51–45, 52–52

Taipei

=== Championship ===
Team	Pld	W	L	PF	PA	PD	Pts
Philippines	10	8	2	906	636	+270	18
Taiwan	10	8	2	955	780	+175	18
South Korea	10	7	3	894	726	+168	17
Thailand	10	4	6	791	809	−18	14

November 30

Thailand	53–91	Philippines
Scoring by half: 25–48, 28–43

Taipei

November 30

Taiwan	74–78	South Korea
Scoring by half: 43–48, 31–30

Taipei

December 1

Taiwan	90–86	Thailand
Scoring by half: 46–49, 44–37

Taipei

December 1

South Korea	81–85	Philippines
Scoring by half: 38–46, 43–39

Taipei

December 2

South Korea	86–71	Thailand
Scoring by half: 41–28, 45–43

Taipei

December 2

Philippines	81–96	Taiwan
Scoring by half: 44–51, 37–45

Taipei

Since Taiwan and the Philippines were level on points, a play-off game for the championship was required.

=== Championship play-off ===
December 3

Taiwan	77–91	Philippines
Scoring by half: 33–49, 44–42

Taipei

== Final standings ==
Rank	Team	Record
1st place, gold medalist(s)	Philippines	9–2
2nd place, silver medalist(s)	Taiwan	8–3
3rd place, bronze medalist(s)	South Korea	7–3
4	Thailand	5–6
5	Malaya	6–5
6	Hong Kong	4–6
7	Singapore	3–7
8	South Vietnam	0–10

== Awards ==
1963 Asian champions

Philippines
Second title

== See also ==
- List of sporting events in Taiwan
