= Chinese Taipei Basketball Association =

Governing body of basketball in Taiwan

- Sport: Basketball
- Abbreviation: CTBA
- Founded: 1954; 72 years ago
- Affiliation: FIBA
- Affiliation date: 1981 (re-admission)
- Regional affiliation: FIBA Asia
- Headquarters: Taipei
- President: Hsieh Dien-Lin

Official website
- www.basketball-tpe.org
- (Chinese Taipei)

Chinese Taipei Basketball Association
- Traditional Chinese: 華臺北籃球協會
Transcriptions
Standard Mandarin
- Hanyu Pinyin: Zhōnghuá Táiběi Lánqiú Xiéhuì

Alternative Chinese name
- Traditional Chinese: 中華民國籃球協會
- Literal meaning: Republic of China Basketball Association (Note: Its official name used by the CTBA itself in Chinese is "中華民國籃球協會" which roughly translates as "Republic of China Basketball Association".)
Transcriptions
Standard Mandarin
- Hanyu Pinyin: Zhōnghuá Mínguó Lánqiú Xiéhuì

The Chinese Taipei Basketball Association (CTBA; Chinese: 中華臺北籃球協會; pinyin: Zhōnghuá Táiběi Lánqiú Xiéhuì) is the governing body of basketball in Taiwan (Republic of China). The CTBA is a member of FIBA and FIBA Asia.

The federation is responsible for maitaining the Chinese Taipei men's and women's national teams and their respective youth teams.

== History ==
The Chinese Taipei Basketball Association (CTBA) was established as the Republic of China Basketball Committee (Chinese: 中華民國籃球委員會) in 1954. The organization changed its name to the Republic of China Basketball Association in 1973.

In 1975, the People's Republic of China was admitted to FIBA and the Taiwanese association was suspended.

It began organizing the international invitational tournament William Jones Cup in 1977 amidst its FIBA suspension.

The Taiwanese association was re-admitted to FIBA agreeing to change its name to the Chinese Taipei Basketball Association and its national teams to play under the designation "Chinese Taipei".

== National teams ==
The CTBA fields both men's and women's national teams and competes in international tournaments as "Chinese Taipei" since 1986. At the 1959 FIBA World Championship, the men's team competed as "Formosa". From 1960 to 1974, the national teams competed under the name "Taiwan".
