= Korea Basketball Association =

Governing body of basketball in South Korea

- Abbreviation: KBA
- Formation: 1925
- Headquarters: Seoul
- Region served: South Korea
- Official language: Korean
- President: Pang Yul
- Parent organization: KOC
- Website: www.koreabasketball.or.kr

The Korea Basketball Association (KBA; Korean: 대한농구협회) is the governing body of basketball in South Korea. Formed in 1925, it is based in Seoul. The KBA is a member of the International Basketball Federation (FIBA) and FIBA Asia. The current president of the federation is Pang Yul.

The federation also organizes the South Korea national basketball team and the South Korea women's national basketball team.

== Tournaments ==
- Korean Basketball League
- Women's Korean Basketball League

== Logo ==
?-2013

2014–present
