= Chinese Taipei men's national basketball team =

Men's national basketball team representing Taiwan

Chinese Taipei
- FIBA ranking: 71 ▼3 (1 September 2026)
- Joined FIBA: 1952
- FIBA zone: FIBA Asia
- National federation: Chinese Taipei Basketball Association
- Coach: Gianluca Tucci

Olympic Games
- Appearances: 1

FIBA World Cup
- Appearances: 2

FIBA Asia Cup
- Appearances: 26
- Medals: (silver) Silver: (1960, 1963); (bronze) Bronze: (1973, 1989)
Home	Away

First international
- As Republic of China (1912–1949); Philippines 26–8 China (Manila, Philippines; 7 February 1913); As Formosa / Chinese Taipei (1954–present); Republic of China 73–46 Thailand (Manila, Philippines; 2 May 1954)

Biggest win
- Chinese Taipei 152–48 Malaysia (Taipei, Taiwan; 21 February 2020)

Biggest defeat
- Chinese Taipei 50–113 China (Busan, South Korea; 2 October 2002)
Medal record
FIBA Asia Cup
Silver medal – second place	1960 Philippines
Silver medal – second place	1963 Republic of China
Bronze medal – third place	1973 Philippines
Bronze medal – third place	1989 China
Asian Games
Silver medal – second place	1954 Manila	Team
Silver medal – second place	1958 Tokyo	Team
William Jones Cup
Gold medal – first place	2001 Taiwan
Gold medal – first place	2004 Taiwan

The Chinese Taipei men's national basketball team (Chinese: 中華台北國家男子籃球隊) represents Taiwan (The Republic of China) in international basketball, and is controlled by the Chinese Taipei Basketball Association. The team was known as Formosa prior to the implementation of the Nagoya Resolution in 1981.

== History ==
During the Republican period in mainland China, the Republic of China men's national basketball team regularly competed against Japan and the Philippines at the Far Eastern Championship Games and also participated in the Olympic basketball tournament twice. Taiwan, which was under Japanese rule at the time, did not have an international basketball team of its own.

Following retreat of Republic of China government to Taiwan amidst the loss of Chinese Civil War, on 7 May 1952, FIBA recognized the All-China Sports Federation, based in the People's Republic of China, as the organization representing Chinese basketball. In the same year, however, FIBA also allowed the Republic of China Basketball Association, which had relocated to Taiwan, to join FIBA separately under the name Formosa (FIBA code: RCF). Before its FIBA membership was terminated in 1974, the team also competed under the following names:

- Taiwan (Country code: TAI), used at the 1960 Summer Olympics qualifying tournament and the 1963 FIBA Asia Championship
- Republic of China (Country code: RCF or ROC), used at the Asian Games and the 1956 Summer Olympics

Led by team leader, Yi Kuo-juei (Chinese: 易國瑞), Chinese Taipei's fourth-place finish at the 1959 FIBA World Championship is the second-best finish at the FIBA World Cup for an Asian team, only behind the Philippines' third-place finish at the 1954 edition.

In 1974, the team's FIBA membership was suspended on the grounds of the "inappropriate use of a name". Following the Nagoya Resolution in 1981, its membership was restored and the team began competing under its present name.

== Competitive record ==
=== Olympic Games ===
Year	Position	Tournament	Host
1956	11	Basketball at the 1956 Summer Olympics	Melbourne, Australia

=== FIBA World Cup ===
FIBA World Cup record
Year	Position	Pld	W	L
As Republic of China
(Argentina) 1950	No qualification for Asia			
(Brazil) 1954	Final round	9	3	6
(Chile) 1959	Final round	9	4	5
(Brazil) 1963	Did not qualify			
(Uruguay) 1967	Did not qualify			
(Socialist Federal Republic of Yugoslavia) 1970	Did not qualify			
(Puerto Rico) 1974	Did not qualify			
(Philippines) 1978	Did not enter			
As Chinese Taipei
(Colombia) 1982	Did not enter			
(Spain) 1986	Did not qualify			
(Argentina) 1990	Did not qualify			
(Canada) 1994	Did not qualify			
(Greece) 1998	Did not qualify			
(United States) 2002	Did not qualify			
(Japan) 2006	Did not qualify			
(Turkey) 2010	Did not qualify			
(Spain) 2014	Did not qualify			
(China) 2019	Did not qualify			
(Philippines) (Japan) (Indonesia) 2023	Did not qualify			
(Qatar) 2027	Did not qualify			
(France) 2031	To be determined			
Total	2/19	18	7	11

=== FIBA Asia Cup ===
FIBA Asia Cup record
Year	Position	Pld	W	L
As Republic of China
(Philippines) 1960	Runners-up	9	7	2
(Taiwan) 1963	Runners-up	11	8	3
(Malaysia) 1965	5th place	9	5	4
(South Korea) 1967	5th place	9	5	4
(Thailand) 1969	4th place	8	4	4
(Japan) 1971	4th place	8	5	3
(Philippines) 1973	3rd place	10	7	3
(Thailand) 1975	Did not enter			
(Malaysia) 1977	Did not enter			
(Japan) 1979	Did not enter			
As Chinese Taipei
(India) 1981	Did not enter			
(Hong Kong) 1983	Did not enter			
(Malaysia) 1985	6th place	6	4	2
(Thailand) 1987	5th place	8	5	3
(China) 1989	3rd place	8	6	2
(Japan) 1991	4th place	8	4	4
(Indonesia) 1993	5th place	6	5	1
(South Korea) 1995	4th place	9	6	3
(Saudi Arabia) 1997	6th place	7	4	3
(Japan) 1999	4th place	8	5	3
(China) 2001	7th place	6	3	3
(China) 2003	11th place	7	4	3
(Qatar) 2005	9th place	7	5	2
(Japan) 2007	6th place	8	3	5
(China) 2009	5th place	9	5	4
(China) 2011	8th place	9	4	5
(Philippines) 2013	4th place	9	6	3
(China) 2015	13th place	5	3	2
(Lebanon) 2017	12th place	4	1	3
(Indonesia) 2022	10th place	4	1	3
(Saudi Arabia) 2025	5th place	5	3	2
Total	26/31	197	118	79

=== Asian Games ===
Asian Games
Year	Position	Pld	W	L
As Republic of China
(India) 1951	Did not enter			
(Philippines) 1954	Runners-up	6	5	1
(Japan) 1958	Runners-up	8	7	1
(Indonesia) 1962	Did not enter			
(Thailand) 1966	5th place	6	4	2
(Thailand) 1970	4th place	8	4	4
(Iran) 1974	Did not enter			
(Thailand) 1978	Did not enter			
As Chinese Taipei
(India) 1982	Did not enter			
(South Korea) 1986	Did not enter			
(China) 1990	5th place	5	3	2
(Japan) 1994	6th place	5	2	3
(Thailand) 1998	5th place	6	4	2
(South Korea) 2002	7th place	6	2	4
(Qatar) 2006	8th place	8	3	5
(China) 2010	9th place	5	1	4
(South Korea) 2014	9th place	2	0	2
(Indonesia) 2018	4th place	6	4	2
(China) 2022	4th place	7	4	3
(Japan) 2026	5th place	4	2	2
Total	14/20	82	45	37

== Team ==
=== Current roster ===
Roster for the 2026 Asian Games.

Chinese Taipei men's national basketball team – 2027 FIBA Basketball World Cup qualification (Asia) roster
Players
Coaches

Pos.	No.	Name	Age – Date of birth	Height	Club	Ctr.
SG		Lin Ting-chien	26 – 31 October 1999	1.92 m (6 ft 4 in)	Taipei Taishin Mars	(Taiwan)
SF		Ma Chien-Hao	24 – 29 April 2001	2.01 m (6 ft 7 in)	Formosa Dreamers	(Taiwan)
SG		Yu Ai-che	24 – 14 February 2002	1.83 m (6 ft 0 in)	Shiga Lakes	(Japan)
G		Chen Ying-chun	33 – 9 June 1993	1.82 m (6 ft 0 in)	Beijing Ducks	(China)
SF		Hu Long-mao	33 – 22 December 1992	1.96 m (6 ft 5 in)	Kaohsiung Aquas	(Taiwan)
C		Tseng Hsiang-chun	28 – 8 August 1998	2.06 m (6 ft 9 in)	Taipei Fubon Braves	(Taiwan)
G		Li Chia-kang	27 – 16 October 1998	1.86 m (6 ft 1 in)	Taoyuan Pauian Pilots	(Taiwan)
C		Brandon Gilbeck (NP)	29 – 9 December 1996	2.13 m (7 ft 0 in)	Formosa Dreamers	(Taiwan)
C		Jonah Morrison	26 – 2 June 2000	2.05 m (6 ft 9 in)	Taoyuan Pauian Pilots	(Taiwan)
G		Lu Chun-Hsiang	29 – 15 July 1997	1.88 m (6 ft 2 in)	Taoyuan Pauian Pilots	(Taiwan)
F		Sam Manu	25 – 24 September 2000	1.97 m (6 ft 6 in)	Taipei Taishin Mars	(Taiwan)
C		Chen Kuan-chuan	32 – 30 December 1993	1.95 m (6 ft 5 in)	Taipei Taishin Mars	(Taiwan)

Head coach

- (Italy) Gianluca Tucci

Assistant coach(es)

- (Taiwan) Yang Che-yi
- (Taiwan) Yang I-feng

Legend

- (C) Team captain
- (NP) Naturalized player
- Club – describes last
  club before the tournament
- Age – describes age
  on 18 February 2026

=== Past rosters ===
Chinese Taipei men's national basketball team – 2025 FIBA Asia Cup roster
Players
Coaches

Pos.	No.	Name	Age – Date of birth	Height	Club	Ctr.
SG	0	Lin Ting-chien	25 – 31 October 1999	1.92 m (6 ft 4 in)	Tianjin Pioneers	(China)
F	1	Mohammad Gadiaga	27 – 27 April 1998	1.88 m (6 ft 2 in)	Akita Northern Happinets	(Japan)
SF	2	Ma Chien-hao	24 – 29 April 2001	2.01 m (6 ft 7 in)	Formosa Dreamers	(Taiwan)
G	4	Robert Tsang Hinton	19 – 20 February 2006	1.96 m (6 ft 5 in)	Harvard Crimson	(United States)
F	5	Liu Cheng (C)	34 – 24 November 1990	1.92 m (6 ft 4 in)	Shanghai Sharks	(China)
G	8	Adam Tsang Hinton	22 – 9 July 2003	1.94 m (6 ft 4 in)	Cornell Cornell Big Red	(United States)
G	9	Chen Ying-chun	32 – 9 June 1993	1.82 m (6 ft 0 in)	Beijing Ducks	(China)
C	10	Hu Long-mao	32 – 22 December 1992	1.96 m (6 ft 5 in)	Kaohsiung Aquas	(Taiwan)
C	34	Brandon Gilbeck (NP)	28 – 9 December 1996	2.13 m (7 ft 0 in)	Formosa Dreamers	(Taiwan)
G	55	Gao Jin-wei	24 – 23 October 2000	1.72 m (5 ft 8 in)	Taoyuan Taiwan Beer Leopards	(Taiwan)
C	62	Chen Kuan-chuan	31 – 30 December 1993	1.95 m (6 ft 5 in)	Taoyuan Pauian Pilots	(Taiwan)
C	88	Tseng Hsiang-chun	26 – 8 August 1998	2.06 m (6 ft 9 in)	Fighting Eagles Nagoya	(Japan)

Head coach

- (Italy) Gianluca Tucci

Assistant coach(es)

- (Taiwan) Yang Che-yi
- (Taiwan) Yang I-feng

Legend

- (C) Team captain
- (NP) Naturalized player
- Club – describes last
  club before the tournament
- Age – describes age
  on 5 August 2025

Chinese Taipei men's national basketball team – 2022 Asian Games roster
Players
Coaches

Pos.	No.	Name	Age – Date of birth	Height	Club	Ctr.
SG	0	Lin Chien-ting	22 – 31 October 1999	1.90 m (6 ft 3 in)	Tianjin Pioneers	(China)
F	1	Mohammad Gadiaga	24 – 27 April 1998	1.88 m (6 ft 2 in)	New Taipei CTBC DEA	(Taiwan)
SF	5	Liu Cheng	31 – 24 November 1990	1.92 m (6 ft 4 in)	Shanghai Sharks	(China)
F	10	Hsieh Ya-Hsuan	23 – 30 October 1998	1.87 m (6 ft 2 in)	New Taipei CTBC DEA	(Taiwan)
G	14	Wu Yung-Cheng	25 – 19 October 1996	1.86 m (6 ft 1 in)	Formosa Dreamers	(Taiwan)
F	20	Chou Po-Hsun	31 – 6 March 1991	1.97 m (6 ft 6 in)	Taiwan Beer	(Taiwan)
C	21	Tseng Hsiang-chun	24 – 8 August 1998	2.00 m (6 ft 7 in)	Taipei Fubon Braves	(Taiwan)
C	26	Lee Te Wei	30 – 15 October 1991	2.02 m (6 ft 8 in)	Formosa Dreamers	(Taiwan)
C	31	Will Artino (NP)	30 – 27 June 1992	2.11 m (6 ft 11 in)	Tainan TSG GhostHawks	(Taiwan)
G	39	Lu Chun Hsiang	25 – 15 July 1997	1.90 m (6 ft 3 in)	Taoyuan Pauian Pilots	(Taiwan)
G	75	Lee Chi Wei	29 – 8 April 1993	1.92 m (6 ft 4 in)	Taoyuan Taiwan Beer Leopards	(Taiwan)
C	76	Tseng Wen-ting	38 – 6 July 1984	2.04 m (6 ft 8 in)	New Taipei CTBC DEA	(Taiwan)

Head coach

- (United States) Charles Parker

Assistant coach(es)

- (Taiwan) Sang Mao-sen
- (Taiwan) Yang Che-yi

Legend

- (C) Team captain
- (NP) Naturalized player
- Club – describes last
  club before the tournament
- Age – describes age
  on 25 September 2022

Chinese Taipei men's national basketball team – 2022 FIBA Asia Cup roster
Players
Coaches

Pos.	No.	Name	Age – Date of birth	Height	Club	Ctr.
SG	0	Lin Chien-ting	22 – 31 October 1999	1.90 m (6 ft 3 in)	Tianjin Pioneers	(China)
PG	2	Lin Chun-chi	24 – 29 January 1998	1.75 m (5 ft 9 in)	Formosa Taishin Dreamers	(Taiwan)
SF	5	Liu Cheng	31 – 24 November 1990	1.92 m (6 ft 4 in)	Shanghai Sharks	(China)
PG	6	Lee Kai-yan	29 – 6 May 1993	1.82 m (6 ft 0 in)	New Taipei Kings	(Taiwan)
PG	9	Chen Ying-chun	29 – 9 June 1993	1.81 m (5 ft 11 in)	Guangzhou Loong Lions	(China)
SG	11	Huang Tsung-han	28 – 7 July 1994	1.93 m (6 ft 4 in)	TaiwanBeer HeroBears	(Taiwan)
PF	15	Chen Kuan-chuan	28 – 30 December 1993	1.95 m (6 ft 5 in)	Taoyuan Pilots	(Taiwan)
F/C	17	Su Shih-hsuan	26 – 9 April 1996	1.97 m (6 ft 6 in)	Bank of Taiwan	(Taiwan)
PF	20	Chou Po-hsun	31 – 6 March 1991	1.97 m (6 ft 6 in)	TaiwanBeer HeroBears	(Taiwan)
SG	21	Chien You-che	26 – 10 September 1995	1.80 m (5 ft 11 in)	New Taipei Kings	(Taiwan)
SF	22	Huang Hung-han	27 – 15 October 1994	1.92 m (6 ft 4 in)	Taoyuan Pilots	(Taiwan)
C	31	Will Artino (NP)	30 – 27 June 1992	2.11 m (6 ft 11 in)	Tainan TSG GhostHawks	(Taiwan)

Head coach

- (United States) Charles Parker

Assistant coach(es)

- (Taiwan) Sang Mao-sen
- (Taiwan) Yang Che-yi

Legend

- (C) Team captain
- (NP) Naturalized player
- Club – describes last
  club before the tournament
- Age – describes age
  on 12 July 2022

Chinese Taipei men's national basketball team – 2018 Asian Games roster
Players
Coaches

Pos.	No.	Name	Age – Date of birth	Height	Club	Ctr.
G	0	Peng Chun-yen	28 – 5 December 1989	1.84 m (6 ft 0 in)	Bank of Taiwan	(Taiwan)
G	1	Chou Yi-hsiang	27 – 4 February 1991	1.91 m (6 ft 3 in)	Xinjiang Flying Tigers	(China)
F	5	Liu Cheng	27 – 24 November 1990	1.92 m (6 ft 4 in)	Zhejiang Lions	(China)
F	8	Chou Po-chen	28 – 8 August 1990	1.98 m (6 ft 6 in)	Yulon Luxgen Dinos	(Taiwan)
G	9	Chen Ying-chun (C)	25 – 9 June 1993	1.81 m (5 ft 11 in)	Guangzhou Long-Lions	(China)
F	10	Hu Long-mao	25 – 22 December 1992	1.96 m (6 ft 5 in)	Fujian Sturgeons	(China)
G	11	Huang Tsung-han	24 – 7 July 1994	1.93 m (6 ft 4 in)	Taiwan Beer	(Taiwan)
G	14	Chiang Yu-an	27 – 4 August 1991	1.74 m (5 ft 9 in)	Taiwan Beer	(Taiwan)
C	15	Chen Kuan-chuan	24 – 30 December 1993	1.97 m (6 ft 6 in)	Pauian Archiland	(Taiwan)
C	16	Lin Chih-wei	26 – 10 July 1992	2.00 m (6 ft 7 in)	Fubon Braves	(Taiwan)
F	21	Douglas Creighton	33 – 7 March 1985	1.97 m (6 ft 6 in)	Pauian Archiland	(Taiwan)
G	27	Huang Jhen	28 – 27 June 1990	1.90 m (6 ft 3 in)	Dacin Tigers	(Taiwan)

Head coach

- (United States) Charlie Parker

Legend

- (C) Team captain
- (NP) Naturalized player
- Club – describes last
  club before the tournament
- Age – describes age
  on 14 August 2018

Roster for the 2017 FIBA Asia Cup.

Chinese Taipei men's national basketball team – 2017 FIBA Asia Cup roster
Players
Coaches

Pos.	No.	Name	Age – Date of birth	Height	Club	Ctr.
C	4	Lin Chih-wei	25 – 10 July 1992	2.00 m (6 ft 7 in)	Fubon Braves	(Taiwan)
F	5	Liu Cheng	26 – 24 November 1990	1.92 m (6 ft 4 in)	Zhejiang Lions	(China)
F	6	Chou Yi-hsiang	26 – 4 February 1991	1.90 m (6 ft 3 in)	Jiangsu Monkey King	(China)
G	7	Yu Huan-ya	23 – 30 November 1993	1.83 m (6 ft 0 in)	Taiwan Beer	(Taiwan)
F	8	Chou Po-chen	27 – 8 August 1990	1.98 m (6 ft 6 in)	Yulon Luxgen Dinos	(Taiwan)
F	10	Hu Long-mao	24 – 22 December 1992	1.96 m (6 ft 5 in)	Fujian Sturgeons	(China)
F	13	Lu Cheng-ju	31 – 13 April 1986	1.94 m (6 ft 4 in)	Yulon Luxgen Dinos	(Taiwan)
G	14	Chiang Yu-an	26 – 4 August 1991	1.74 m (5 ft 9 in)	Taiwan Beer	(Taiwan)
F	20	Chou Po-hsun	26 – 6 March 1991	1.97 m (6 ft 6 in)	Taiwan Beer	(Taiwan)
G	21	Cheng Li-huan	29 – 5 March 1988	1.89 m (6 ft 2 in)	Bank of Taiwan	(Taiwan)
C	28	Wu Hung-hsing	27 – 21 October 1989	2.02 m (6 ft 8 in)	Pauian Archiland	(Taiwan)
C	54	Wu Tai-hao	32 – 7 February 1985	2.03 m (6 ft 8 in)	Pauian Archiland	(Taiwan)

Head coach

- (Taiwan) Chou Chun-san

Assistant coach(es)

- (Taiwan) Yen Hsing-su
- (Taiwan) Chiu Chi-yi

Legend

- (C) Team captain
- (NP) Naturalized player
- Club – describes last
  club before the tournament
- Age – describes age
  on 8 August 2017

=== Head coach history ===
- (United States) Charles Holsinger (Chinese: 何聖格) – 1954
- (Taiwan) Niu Bing-yi (Chinese: 牛炳鎰) – 1954
- (United States) Bud Schaeffer (Chinese: 許彼德) – 1956
- (Taiwan) Chua Bon-hua (Chinese: 蔡文華) – 1958, 1959
- (United States) Donald Spencer (Chinese: 史賓塞) – 1960
- (United States) Don Odle (Chinese: 歐德里) – 1960
- (Taiwan) Wang Shixuan (Chinese: 王士選) – 1963
- (Taiwan) Zhu Yu-hou (Chinese: 朱裕厚) – 1964
- (Taiwan) Kya Iskyun (Chinese: 賈志軍) – 1965
- (Taiwan) Willie Chu (Chinese: 朱聲漪) – 1966, 1970
- (Taiwan) Hoo Cha-pen (Chinese: 霍劍平) – 1967, 1971, 1973
- (Taiwan) Wang Yih-jiun (Chinese: 王毅軍) – 1969
- (Taiwan) Liu Chun-ching (Chinese: 劉俊卿) – 1985, 1989, 1990
- (Taiwan) Chen Tsu-li (Chinese: 陳祖烈) – 1987
- (Taiwan) Lee Ching-chi (Chinese: 李清棋) – 1991, 2003
- (Taiwan) Zhang Ke-you (Chinese: 張克佑) – 1993 (East Asian Games, ABC Championship)
- (Taiwan) Bu Shu-ren (Chinese: 卜樹人) – 1994
- (Taiwan) Chien Yi-fei (Chinese: 錢一飛) – 1995, 1998, 1999, 2001
- (Taiwan) Ku Chi-hsiung (Chinese: 古吉雄) – 1997 (East Asian Games, ABC Championship)
- (Taiwan) Lee Yun-kwang (Chinese: 李雲光) – 2001, 2002, 2005 (East Asian Basketball Championship, FIBA Asia Championship, East Asian Games), 2006, ~~2023~~
- (Taiwan) Hu Zai-lin (Chinese: 胡再麟) – 2004
- (South Korea) Chung Kwang-suk (Chinese: 鄭光錫) – 2007, 2009 (East Asian Basketball Championship, FIBA Asia Championship, East Asian Games)
- (China) Zhang Xuelei (Chinese: 張學雷) – 2010
- (Taiwan) Chou Chun-san (Chinese: 周俊三) – 2011 (East Asian Basketball Championship, FIBA Asia Championship), 2015, 2017 (East Asian Basketball Championship, FIBA Asia Cup FIBA Basketball World Cup qualification), 2018, 2022
- (Taiwan) Hsu Jin-che (Chinese: 許晉哲) – 2012, 2013 (East Asian Basketball Championship, FIBA Asia Championship, East Asian Games), 2014
- (United States) Otis Hughley Jr. (Chinese: 歐提斯) – 2014
- (Taiwan) Yan Chia-hua (Chinese: 閻家驊) – 2016
- (United States) Charlie Parker (Chinese: 帕克) – 2018, 2020, 2021, 2022 (FIBA Basketball World Cup qualification, FIBA Asia Cup)
- (Taiwan) Sam Mao-sen (Chinese: 桑茂森) – 2023, 2024
- (Italy) Gianluca Tucci (Chinese: 圖奇) – 2024, 2025 (FIBA Asia Cup qualification, FIBA Asia Cup, FIBA Basketball World Cup qualification), 2026 (FIBA Basketball World Cup qualification, Asian Games)

== See also ==
- Chinese Taipei women's national basketball team
- Chinese Taipei men's national under-19 basketball team
- Chinese Taipei men's national under-17 basketball team
- Chinese Taipei men's national 3x3 team
