= 2012 William Jones Cup =

Basketball tournament in Taiwan

Tournament information
- Location: Taipei
- Dates: M: August 18–26; W: ?–?
- Host: Taiwan
- Teams: M: 9 W: ?

Final positions
- Champions: M: Philippines; W: Cathay Life
- 1st runners-up: M: Mahram Tehran; W: Chunghwa Telecom
- 2nd runners-up: M: United States; W: Japan
- MVP: (Philippines) LA Tenorio

The 2012 William Jones Cup was the 34th tournament of the William Jones Cup that took place at the Taipei Physical Education College Gymnasium in Taipei, Republic of China (commonly known as Taiwan) from August 18 to 26, 2012.

As in previous tournaments, this year's edition of the Jones Cup uses a single round robin format. The Philippines men's national basketball team won the championship by ending the tournament with the best win–loss record. The Philippines clinched the title with a 76–75 win over the United States Jones Cup National Team the tournament's final game day.

== Men's tournament ==
=== Team standings ===
Team	Pld	W	L	PF	PA	PD	Pts	Tie
Philippines	8	7	1	658	622	+36	15	
(Iran) Mahram Tehran BC	8	6	2	650	590	+60	14	
United States	8	5	3	715	605	+110	13	2–0
Chinese Taipei	8	5	3	622	583	+39	13	1–1
(South Korea) Anyang KGC	8	5	3	700	623	+77	13	0–2
Japan	8	3	5	593	623	−30	11	1–0
Lebanon	8	3	5	613	646	−33	11	0–1
Jordan	8	2	6	620	665	−45	10	
Guanghua	8	0	8	546	758	−212	8	

=== Results ===
All times in UTC+8.

==== Day 1 ====
August 18
13:00

Report

Mahram Tehran (Iran)	89–74	Lebanon
Scoring by quarter: 14–10, 19–19, 28–25, 28–20
Pts: Bahrami 24; Rebs: Sahakian 7 Asts: Kamrani 6		Pts: Famous, Elie Stephan; Rebs: Famous 11; Asts: Akl 7

Taipei PE College Gym, Taipei

August 18
15:00

Report

Anyang KGC (South Korea)	109–83	Guanghua
Scoring by quarter: 27–20, 19–18, 31–19, 32–26
Pts: Yang H. J. 19; Rebs: Choi 8 Asts: Kim T.S. 8		Pts: Chou 24; Rebs: Wu H.H. 7 Asts: 3 players 3

Taipei PE College Gym, Taipei

August 18
17:00

Report

Philippines	88–78	Jordan
Scoring by quarter: 25–16, 11–23, 30–15, 22–24
Pts: Douthit 17; Rebs: Douthit 14; Asts: Mercado 9		Pts: Wright 24; Rebs: Hussein 13; Asts: Al-Sous 4

Taipei PE College Gym, Taipei

August 18
19:30

Report

Zhonghua	82–57	Japan
Scoring by quarter: 19–11, 16–12, 26–17, 21–17
Pts: Chang 16; Rebs: Tseng 9 Asts: Mao, Su 2		Pts: Takeuchi K. 19; Rebs: Takeuchi K. 11; Asts: Watanabe 3

Taipei PE College Gym, Taipei

==== Day 2 ====
August 19
13:00

Report

Lebanon	78–94	(South Korea) Anyang KGC
Scoring by quarter: 19–24, 17–16, 20–33, 22–21
Pts: Famous 17; Rebs: Famous 14; Asts: Ibrahim, Sarkis 3		Pts: Patillo 19; Rebs: Patillo 10; Asts: Lee J.H. 5

Taipei PE College Gym, Taipei

August 19
15:00

Report

Guanghua	68–99	Philippines
Scoring by quarter: 18–28, 14–25, 17–22, 19–24
Pts: Sung 22; Rebs: 3 players 6 Asts: Peng 3		Pts: Lanete 21; Rebs: Reyes 10; Asts: Chan, Norwood 5

Taipei PE College Gym, Taipei

August 19
17:00

Report

Japan	59–71	(Iran) Mahram Tehran
Scoring by quarter: 10–9, 14–21, 17–23, 18–18
Pts: Takeuchi J. 14; Rebs: Takeuchi J. 15; Asts: Takeuchi J., Sakurai 2		Pts: Bahrami 32; Rebs: Sahakian 11; Asts: Kamrani 5

Taipei PE College Gym, Taipei

August 19
19:00

Report

United States	100–77	Zhonghua
Scoring by quarter: 21–9, 25–16, 25–18, 29–34
Pts: Barnes 16; Rebs: Kearse, Melvin 7 Asts: Kearse, Marshall 3		Pts: Liu 16; Rebs: Wu 10; Asts: Su 3

Taipei PE College Gym, Taipei

==== Day 3 ====
August 20
13:00

Report

Guanghua	50–85	Japan
Scoring by quarter: 14–20, 10–20, 15–22, 11–23
Pts: Chen C. Y., Sung 14; Rebs: Lin 8 Asts: 3 players 1		Pts: Harimoto, Nagayoshi 16; Rebs: Nagayoshi 10; Asts: Hiejima 9

Taipei PE College Gym, Taipei

August 20
15:00

Report

Jordan	87–68	Lebanon
Scoring by quarter: 16–22, 23–18, 33–13, 15–15
Pts: Wright 27; Rebs: Hussein 23; Asts: Wright 5		Pts: Ibrahim, Stephan 20; Rebs: Famous 11; Asts: Akl, Sarkis 5

Taipei PE College Gym, Taipei

August 20
17:00

Report

Anyang KGC (South Korea)	75–84	United States
Scoring by quarter: 13–16, 19–21, 19–29, 24–18
Pts: Lee 26; Rebs: Patillo 7 Asts: Kim 11		Pts: Marshall 25; Rebs: Dearman 9 Asts: Kearse 5

Taipei PE College Gym, Taipei

August 20
19:00

Report

Zhonghua	64–75	(Iran) Mahram Tehran
Scoring by quarter: 17–22, 10–20, 24–20, 13–13
Pts: 3 tied 12; Rebs: 4 tied 4 Asts: 2 tied 4		Pts: Bahrami 30; Rebs: Sahakian 10; Asts: Kamrani 5

Taipei PE College Gym, Taipei

==== Day 4 ====
August 21
13:00

Report

United States	126–71	Guanghua
Scoring by quarter: 18–13, 31–20, 43–19, 34–19
Pts: Williams 27; Rebs: Reese 10; Asts: Justice 7		Pts: Sung 26; Rebs: Lin 6 Asts: 2 tied at 3

Taipei PE College Gym, Taipei

August 21
15:00

Report

Philippines	82–79	(South Korea) Anyang KGC
Scoring by quarter: 24–17, 18–23, 23–31, 17–8
Pts: Chan 14; Rebs: Douthit 12; Asts: Norwood 5		Pts: Patillo 19; Rebs: Yang 8 Asts: Kim 4

Taipei PE College Gym, Taipei

August 21
17:00

Report

Japan	84–83	Jordan
Scoring by quarter: 16–13, 30–15, 23–22, 15–33
Pts: Furukawa 23; Rebs: Takeuchi 10; Asts: Takeuchi 5		Pts: Al Sous 23; Rebs: Hussein 14; Asts: 4 tied at 4

Taipei PE College Gym, Taipei

August 21
19:00

Report

Lebanon	74–81	Zhonghua
Scoring by quarter: 21–12, 14–24, 16–19, 23–26
Pts: Nour 19; Rebs: Famous 13; Asts: Akl 6		Pts: Tseng 16; Rebs: Lin 11; Asts: 2 tied at 3

Taipei PE College Gym, Taipei

==== Day 5 ====
August 22
13:00

Report

Mahram Tehran (Iran)	97–89 (2OT)	United States
Scoring by quarter: 27–21, 18–17, 18–19, 11–17, Overtime: 7–7, 16–8
Pts: Bahrami 29; Rebs: Sahakian 13; Asts: Kamrani 6		Pts: Marshall 22; Rebs: Dearman 12; Asts: 2 tied at 2

Taipei PE College Gym, Taipei

August 22
16:00

Report

Guanghua	67–88	Lebanon
Scoring by quarter: 13–22, 12–17, 26–20, 16–29
Pts: 2 tied at 13; Rebs: Hu 6 Asts: Hung 3		Pts: Nour 26; Rebs: Nour 10; Asts: Martinez 3

Taipei PE College Gym, Taipei

August 22
18:00

Report

Philippines	88–84	Japan
Scoring by quarter: 26–23, 10–24, 22–24, 30–13
Pts: Douthit 26; Rebs: Douthit 15; Asts: Tenorio 5		Pts: Takeuchi 17; Rebs: Takeuchi 10; Asts: Hiejima 3

Taipei PE College Gym, Taipei

August 22
20:00

Report

Jordan	63–85	Zhonghua
Scoring by quarter: 15–13, 21–18, 11–28, 16–26
Pts: Zaghab 15; Rebs: Zaghab 12; Asts: Al Sous 4		Pts: Chang 22; Rebs: Chang 8 Asts: Su 5

Taipei PE College Gym, Taipei

==== Day 6 ====
August 23
13:00

Report

Japan	73–95	United States
Scoring by quarter: 22–19, 18–32, 19–26, 14–18
Pts: Furukawa 18; Rebs: 3 tied at 7 Asts: Takeuchi 4		Pts: Justice 18; Rebs: Melvin 8 Asts: Williams 4

Taipei PE College Gym, Taipei

August 23
15:00

Report

Lebanon	91–72	Philippines
Scoring by quarter: 22–15, 21–17, 31–14, 17–26
Pts: Stephan 28; Rebs: Famous 11; Asts: Akl 10		Pts: Norwood 15; Rebs: Thoss 8 Asts: 3 tied at 2

Taipei PE College Gym, Taipei

August 23
17:00

Report

Jordan	84–105	(South Korea) Anyang KGC
Scoring by quarter: 22–19, 18–32, 19–26, 14–18
Pts: Wright 24; Rebs: Zaghab 13; Asts: 2 tied at 4		Pts: 2 tied at 24; Rebs: Patillo 17; Asts: Lee 4

Taipei PE College Gym, Taipei

August 23
19:00

Report

Guanghua	71–83	(Iran) Mahram Tehran
Scoring by quarter: 16–27, 12–19, 20–15, 23–22
Pts: Lin 14; Rebs: 2 tied at 8 Asts: Peng7		Pts: Davarpanah 19; Rebs: Sohrabnejad 11; Asts: Aslani 6

Taipei PE College Gym, Taipei

==== Day 7 ====
August 24
13:00

Report

United States	77–66	Jordan
Scoring by quarter: 16–27, 12–19, 20–15, 23–22
Pts: Marshall 16; Rebs: 2 tied at 8 Asts: Arnold 3		Pts: Wright 18; Rebs: Zaghab 9 Asts: Abdeen 5

Taipei PE College Gym, Taipei

August 24
15:00

Philippines	77–75	(Iran) Mahram Tehran
Scoring by quarter: 21–19, 12–14, 25–16, 19–26

Taipei PE College Gym, Taipei

August 24
17:00

Anyang KGC (South Korea)	84–62	Japan

Taipei PE College Gym, Taipei

August 24
19:00

Zhonghua	84–66	Guanghua

Taipei PE College Gym, Taipei

==== Day 8 ====
August 25
13:00

Lebanon	70–67	United States

Taipei PE College Gym, Taipei

August 25
15:00

Guanghua	71–85	Jordan

Taipei PE College Gym, Taipei

August 25
17:00

Mahram Tehran (Iran)	73–82	(South Korea) Anyang KGC

Taipei PE College Gym, Taipei

August 25
19:00

Philippines	76–72	Zhonghua
Scoring by quarter: 16–16, 21–13, 17–27, 22–16

Taipei PE College Gym, Taipei

==== Day 9 ====
August 26
13:00

Jordan	74–87	(Iran) Mahram Tehran

Taipei PE College Gym, Taipei

August 26
15:00

Japan	89–70	Lebanon

Taipei PE College Gym, Taipei

August 26
17:00

United States	75–76	Philippines
Scoring by quarter: 13–12, 21–11, 25–28, 16–25
Pts: Arnold, Justice 17; Rebs: Dearman 11; Asts: Arnold 4		Pts: Tenorio 20; Rebs: Douthit 12; Asts: Norwood, Tenorio 3

Taipei PE College Gym, Taipei

August 26
19:00

Zhonghua	77–72	(South Korea) Anyang KGC

Taipei PE College Gym, Taipei

== Awards ==
2012 William Jones Cup

Philippines
Fourth title

Most Valuable Player
LA Tenorio
