= 2010 FIBA Asia Under-18 Championship =

Youth basketball tournament

21st FIBA Under-18 Asian Basketball Championship
- Official logo of the 2010 FIBA Asia Under-18 Championship

Tournament details
- Host country: Yemen
- City: Sana'a
- Dates: September 22 – October 1
- Teams: 16 (from 1 confederation)
- Venues: 2 (in 1 host city)

Final positions
- Champions: China (9th title)
- Runners-up: South Korea
- Third place: Chinese Taipei

Tournament statistics
- Top scorer: (Japan) Ando (23.4)
- Top rebounds: (Syria) Al-Sati (14.8)
- Top assists: (South Korea) Kim G.Y. (5.2)
- PPG (Team): China (86.4)
- RPG (Team): China (38.4)
- APG (Team): South Korea (16.4)

Official website
- 2010 FIBA Asia U-18 Championship

The 2010 FIBA Asia Under-18 Championship was the 21st edition of the FIBA Asia's youth basketball championship. The games were played in Sana'a, Yemen between 22 September and 1 October 2010. The top 3 teams qualified for the 2011 FIBA Under-19 World Championship in Latvia.

== Qualification ==
According to the FIBA Asia rules, each zone had two places, and the hosts (Yemen) and holders (Iran) were automatically qualified. The other four places are allocated to the zones according to performance in the 2008 FIBA Asia Under-18 Championship.

East Asia (2+2)	Gulf (2)	Middle Asia (2+1)	Southeast Asia (2)	West Asia (2+2+1)
China	Saudi Arabia	Kazakhstan	Philippines	Yemen
Chinese Taipei	Qatar	India	Malaysia	Iran
Japan		Sri Lanka		Lebanon
South Korea				Iraq
				Syria

== Draw ==
Group A	Group B	Group C	Group D
Iran; Chinese Taipei; Sri Lanka; Malaysia	Kazakhstan; South Korea; Lebanon; Qatar	Syria; China; Philippines; Saudi Arabia	India; Japan; Iraq; Yemen

== Preliminary round ==
=== Group A ===
Team	Pld	W	L	PF	PA	PD	Pts
Iran	3	3	0	280	145	+135	6
Chinese Taipei	3	2	1	254	163	+91	5
Malaysia	3	1	2	190	251	−61	4
Sri Lanka	3	0	3	133	298	−165	3

September 22
9:00

Report

Chinese Taipei	56–67 (OT)	Iran
Scoring by quarter: 10–13, 17–19, 10–8, 14–11, Overtime: 5–16
Pts: Hu L.M. 14; Rebs: Chen K.C. 6 Asts: Chien W.J. 2		Pts: Torabikhah 17; Rebs: Hadizadeh 9 Asts: Omari 5

May 22 Stadium, Sana'a
Referees: Rafael Britanico (PHI), Anton Kozlov (KAZ), Sharad Vasant Bansode (IND)

September 22
9:00

Report

Malaysia	86–52	Sri Lanka
Scoring by quarter: 20–17, 23–18, 29–9, 14–8
Pts: Choo W.H. 18; Rebs: Liaw C.H. 2 Asts: Tong W.K. 2		Pts: Thevakumar 12; Rebs: K. Perera 4 Asts: K. Perera 2

Balkis Club Court, Sana'a
Referees: Toru Katayose (JPN), Wang Xiaochun (CHN), Paul Skayem (LIB)

September 23
9:00

Report

Chinese Taipei	96–47	Malaysia
Scoring by quarter: 22–8, 17–10, 28–16, 29–13
Pts: Chien W.J. 20; Rebs: Chien W.J., Hung K.C. 8 Asts: Ko M.H. 5		Pts: Ng K.C. 9 Rebs: Yeo 10; Asts: Ang, Sangaralingam, Ng K.C. 1

May 22 Stadium, Sana'a
Referees: Shigeyuki Arisawa (JPN), Yasser Abbas (QAT), Wang Mei (CHN)

September 23
9:00

Report

Iran	110–32	Sri Lanka
Scoring by quarter: 34–6, 18–8, 27–3, 31–15
Pts: Sedighi 21; Rebs: Sedighi, Hadizadeh, Mirzaei 6 Asts: Omari 3		Pts: Rathnayake 13; Rebs: Mahawaduge 3 Asts: K. Perera 3

Balkis Club Court, Sana'a
Referees: Sameer Saeed (IRQ), Mohammed Al-Saleh (KSA), Kim Yang-Woo (KOR)

September 24
9:00

Report

Malaysia	57–103	Iran
Scoring by quarter: 11–17, 18–24, 19–31, 9–31
Pts: Fong Y.Y. 15; Rebs: Yeo 8 Asts: Ng K.C. 5		Pts: Omari, Sedighi 16; Rebs: Hadizadeh 7 Asts: Mashayekhi 4

Balkis Club Court, Sana'a
Referees: Rajan Vellingirinathan (IND), Kim Young-Hyun (KOR), Wang Xiaochun (CHN)

September 24
12:00

Report

Sri Lanka	49–102	Chinese Taipei
Scoring by quarter: 12–26, 11–26, 15–27, 11–23
Pts: K. Perera 20; Rebs: K. Perera, Rathnayake 3 Asts: K. Perera 2		Pts: Hung K.C. 25; Rebs: Hu L.M. 6 Asts: Li C.C. 4

Balkis Club Court, Sana'a
Referees: Salah Al-Humaihim (KSA), Faez Badahman (YEM), Shigeyuki Arisawa (JPN)

=== Group B ===
Team	Pld	W	L	PF	PA	PD	Pts	Tiebreaker
Lebanon	3	2	1	272	173	+99	5	1–1 / 1.057
South Korea	3	2	1	251	180	+71	5	1–1 / 1.007
Kazakhstan	3	2	1	248	194	+54	5	1–1 / 0.941
Qatar	3	0	3	112	336	−224	3	

September 22
11:00

Report

South Korea	69–76	Kazakhstan
Scoring by quarter: 17–14, 13–19, 14–29, 25–14
Pts: Han S.H. 16; Rebs: Lee J.H. 9 Asts: Kim G.Y. 4		Pts: Ilyin 25; Rebs: Dynnik 12; Asts: Dynnik 4

May 22 Stadium, Sana'a
Referees: Reza Javadi (IRI), Salah Al-Humaihim (KSA), Faez Badahman (YEM)

September 22
13:00

Report

Qatar	32–123	Lebanon
Scoring by quarter: 8–31, 10–29, 6–20, 8–43
Pts: Al-Kuwari, Ba-Sulaiman 6 Rebs: Al-Hajri, Al-Mulla 3 Asts: Four players 1		Pts: Massoud 19; Rebs: Massoud 8 Asts: Ibrahim 6

May 22 Stadium, Sana'a
Referees: Anastasios Piloidis (GRE), Rajan Vellingirinathan (IND), Chan Owe Siong (MAS)

September 23
11:00

Report

Kazakhstan	67–83	Lebanon
Scoring by quarter: 12–22, 16–23, 20–20, 19–18
Pts: Verechshagin 25; Rebs: Verechshagin, Dynnik 9 Asts: Ilyin 3		Pts: Ibrahim 27; Rebs: Iskandar 10; Asts: Mechref 5

May 22 Stadium, Sana'a
Referees: Wang Xiaochun (CHN), Yong Wai Chong (MAS), Rajan Vellingirinathan (IND)

September 23
13:00

Report

South Korea	108–38	Qatar
Scoring by quarter: 32–8, 22–7, 25–9, 29–14
Pts: Moon S.G. 17; Rebs: Lee J.H. 8 Asts: Kim G.Y. 5		Pts: Al-Kuwari 12; Rebs: Al-Hajri, Al-Kuwari 5 Asts: Four players 1

May 22 Stadium, Sana'a
Referees: Ricor Buaron (PHI), Adel Al-Khawlani (YEM), Nidal Ayian (SYR)

September 24
13:00

Report

Kazakhstan	105–42	Qatar
Scoring by quarter: 21–9, 24–9, 27–10, 33–14
Pts: Ilyin 24; Rebs: Orazov, Verechshagin 10; Asts: Kurochka 4		Pts: Al-Jaber 10; Rebs: Al-Jaber 10; Asts: Four players 1

May 22 Stadium, Sana'a
Referees: Chan Owe Siong (MAS), Sharad Vasant Bansode (IND), Nidal Ayian (SYR)

September 24
15:00

Report

Lebanon	66–74	South Korea
Scoring by quarter: 15–22, 10–31, 24–10, 17–11
Pts: Ibrahim 32; Rebs: Ibrahim 10; Asts: Mechref, Jadayel 2		Pts: Kim G.Y. 20; Rebs: Kim J.Y. 13; Asts: Kim G.Y. 6

May 22 Stadium, Sana'a
Referees: Fedor Dmitriev (BLR), Sameer Saeed (IRQ), Verej Abkarian (IRI)

=== Group C ===
Team	Pld	W	L	PF	PA	PD	Pts
China	3	3	0	280	183	+97	6
Philippines	3	2	1	222	211	+11	5
Syria	3	1	2	178	211	−33	4
Saudi Arabia	3	0	3	196	271	−75	3

September 22
15:00

Report

Saudi Arabia	68–86	Philippines
Scoring by quarter: 21–22, 15–25, 19–19, 13–20
Pts: Al-Marwani 17; Rebs: Al-Muwallad 7 Asts: Al-Mutairi, Al-Yami 3		Pts: Teng 20; Rebs: Banal 6 Asts: Five players 3

May 22 Stadium, Sana'a
Referees: Kim Young-Hyun (KOR), Shigeyuki Arisawa (JPN), Adel Al-Khawlani (YEM)

September 22
17:00

Report

China	82–48	Syria
Scoring by quarter: 18–13, 21–14, 18–11, 25–10
Pts: Guo A.L. 21; Rebs: Sun T.L. 8 Asts: Luo H.C. 4		Pts: Al-Sati 14; Rebs: Al-Sati 13; Asts: Sirjieh 3

May 22 Stadium, Sana'a
Referees: Verej Abkarian (IRI), Kim Yang-Woo (KOR), Sameer Saeed (IRQ)

September 23
12:00

Report

China	115–60	Saudi Arabia
Scoring by quarter: 26–14, 40–10, 25–21, 24–15
Pts: Guo A.L. 23; Rebs: Wang Z.L. 6 Asts: Wang Z.R. 4		Pts: Al-Namer, Al-Muwallad, Barnawi 8 Rebs: Abo-Jalas 6 Asts: Al-Muwallad, Barnawi 2

Balkis Club Court, Sana'a
Referees: Anton Kozlov (KAZ), Chan Owe Siong (MAS), Samed Noman (YEM)

September 23
17:00

Report

Syria	60–61	Philippines
Scoring by quarter: 9–17, 19–10, 12–19, 20–15
Pts: Al-Samman 15; Rebs: Al-Sati 23; Asts: Sirjieh, Al-Sati 3		Pts: Ravena 19; Rebs: Escoto 12; Asts: Alolino 4

May 22 Stadium, Sana'a
Referees: Fedor Dmitriev (BLR), Reza Javadi (IRI), Toru Katayose (JPN)

September 24
11:00

Report

Philippines	75–83	China
Scoring by quarter: 23–23, 15–18, 14–19, 23–23
Pts: Banal 19; Rebs: Ferrer 8 Asts: Ravena 4		Pts: Zhu X.H. 20; Rebs: Sun T.L., Wang Z.L. 10; Asts: Sun T.L. 4

May 22 Stadium, Sana'a
Referees: Anastasios Piloidis (GRE), Toru Katayose (JPN), Rabee Al-Masri (LIB)

September 24
17:00

Report

Saudi Arabia	68–70	Syria
Scoring by quarter: 19–20, 19–11, 15–21, 15–18
Pts: Al-Muwallad 21; Rebs: Al-Marwani 6 Asts: Al-Muwallad 4		Pts: Otabachi 27; Rebs: Al-Sati 12; Asts: Sirjieh 5

May 22 Stadium, Sana'a
Referees: Reza Javadi (IRI), Yong Wai Chong (MAS), Paul Skayem (LIB)

=== Group D ===
Team	Pld	W	L	PF	PA	PD	Pts
Japan	3	3	0	235	198	+37	6
Yemen	3	2	1	231	168	+63	5
Iraq	3	1	2	191	208	−17	4
India	3	0	3	188	271	−83	3

September 22
12:00

Report

India	72–89	Japan
Scoring by quarter: 16–14, 19–32, 9–8, 28–35
Pts: Ar. Singh 28; Rebs: Ar. Singh 4 Asts: 0		Pts: Ando 38; Rebs: Hareyama 4 Asts: Ando 1

Balkis Club Court, Sana'a
Referees: Yasser Abbas (QAT), Nidal Ayian (SYR), Yong Wai Chong (MAS)

September 22
19:00

Report

Yemen	72–42	Iraq
Scoring by quarter: 13–8, 22–6, 23–7, 14–21
Pts: Yaeesh 21; Rebs: Moqbel 9 Asts: Najib 7		Pts: Abdul-Khaleq 12; Rebs: Khalil 7 Asts: Salim, Dheyaa 3

May 22 Stadium, Sana'a
Referees: Fedor Dmitriev (BLR), Rabee Al-Masri (LIB), Ricor Buaron (PHI)

September 23
15:00

Report

Japan	78–62	Iraq
Scoring by quarter: 24–11, 21–19, 11–14, 22–18
Pts: Ogaki 19; Rebs: Ando 5 Asts: Kimura, Ando 3		Pts: Mankhi 17; Rebs: Ali, Basem 6 Asts: Mankhi, Fahem 3

May 22 Stadium, Sana'a
Referees: Rabee Al-Masri (LIB), Verej Abkarian (IRI), Kim Young-Hyun (KOR)

September 23
19:00

Report

India	58–95	Yemen
Scoring by quarter: 13–18, 9–28, 13–22, 23–27
Pts: Ar. Singh 27; Rebs: Shah 8 Asts: 0		Pts: Yaeesh, Sadaqah 27; Rebs: Moqbel 15; Asts: Sadaqah 8

May 22 Stadium, Sana'a
Referees: Anastasios Piloidis (GRE), Paul Skayem (LIB), Rafael Britanico (PHI)

September 24
9:00

Report

Iraq	87–58	India
Scoring by quarter: 24–16, 21–18, 19–13, 23–11
Pts: Muayad 40; Rebs: Muayad 12; Asts: Mankhi 5		Pts: Am. Singh 16; Rebs: Shah 9 Asts: Joseph 4

May 22 Stadium, Sana'a
Referees: Rafael Britanico (PHI), Kim Yang-Woo (KOR), Mohammed Al-Saleh (KSA)

September 24
19:00

Report

Yemen	64–68	Japan
Scoring by quarter: 11–21, 19–17, 19–12, 15–18
Pts: Yaeesh 21; Rebs: Abdullah 11; Asts: Yaeesh 5		Pts: Ando 31; Rebs: Hareyama 7 Asts: Ando 2

May 22 Stadium, Sana'a
Referees: Yasser Abbas (QAT), Wang Mei (CHN), Anton Kozlov (KAZ)

== Second round ==
- The results and the points of the matches between the same teams that were already played during the preliminary round shall be taken into account for the second round.

=== Group E ===
Team	Pld	W	L	PF	PA	PD	Pts	Tiebreaker
South Korea	5	4	1	413	353	+60	9	1–0
Iran	5	4	1	405	324	+81	9	0–1
Chinese Taipei	5	3	2	408	353	+55	8	
Lebanon	5	2	3	378	373	+5	7	1–0
Kazakhstan	5	2	3	380	391	−11	7	0–1
Malaysia	5	0	5	295	485	−190	5	

September 25
9:00

Report

Chinese Taipei	90–99	South Korea
Scoring by quarter: 22–38, 18–23, 21–19, 29–19
Pts: Chen Y.C. 19; Rebs: Huang P.W. 6 Asts: Chen Y.C. 5		Pts: Lee S.H. 24; Rebs: Lee S.H. 12; Asts: Kim G.Y. 12

May 22 Stadium, Sana'a
Referees: Anastasios Piloidis (GRE), Wang Xiaochun (CHN), Salah Al-Humaihim (KSA)

September 25
11:00

Report

Iran	94–78	Kazakhstan
Scoring by quarter: 23–11, 24–27, 29–14, 18–26
Pts: Torabikhah 24; Rebs: Mirzaei 10; Asts: Omari 6		Pts: Ilyin 19; Rebs: Yagodkin, Orazov, Verechshagin 7 Asts: Lapchenko, Orazov 2

May 22 Stadium, Sana'a
Referees: Toru Katayose (JPN), Rafael Britanico (PHI), Sameer Saeed (IRQ)

September 25
13:00

Report

Malaysia	66–96	Lebanon
Scoring by quarter: 7–25, 18–20, 19–24, 22–27
Pts: Fong Y.Y. 12; Rebs: Choo W.H. 6 Asts: Ang, Liaw C.H. 2		Pts: Ozeir 29; Rebs: Bechara 15; Asts: Al-Amine 4

May 22 Stadium, Sana'a
Referees: Wang Mei (CHN), Samed Noman (YEM), Nidal Ayian (SYR)

September 26
13:00

Report

South Korea	79–62	Iran
Scoring by quarter: 27–18, 12–13, 18–15, 22–16
Pts: Moon S.G. 20; Rebs: Kim J.Y. 8 Asts: Kim G.Y. 8		Pts: Mashayekhi, Shahbaznejad, Abdollahi 10; Rebs: Shahbaznejad, Abdollahi, Mirzaei 6 Asts: Mashayekhi 7

May 22 Stadium, Sana'a
Referees: Fedor Dmitriev (BLR), Ricor Buaron (PHI), Rajan Vellingirinathan (IND)

September 26
15:00

Report

Lebanon	79–87	Chinese Taipei
Scoring by quarter: 28–13, 20–27, 17–22, 14–25
Pts: Ibrahim 31; Rebs: Ibrahim 7 Asts: Al-Amine 5		Pts: Hu L.M. 16; Rebs: Chien W.J. 6 Asts: Chien C.Y., Hu L.M. 3

May 22 Stadium, Sana'a
Referees: Yasser Abbas (QAT), Mohammed Al-Saleh (KSA), Toru Katayose (JPN)

September 26
17:00

Report

Kazakhstan	98–66	Malaysia
Scoring by quarter: 33–15, 16–21, 33–13, 16–17
Pts: Verechshagin 19; Rebs: Orazov 9 Asts: Yagodkin 5		Pts: Choo W.H. 12; Rebs: Ang, Yeo 5 Asts: Ng K.C. 3

May 22 Stadium, Sana'a
Referees: Wang Xiaochun (CHN), Shigeyuki Arisawa (JPN), Faez Badahman (YEM)

September 27
9:00

Report

Chinese Taipei	79–61	Kazakhstan
Scoring by quarter: 25–13, 19–15, 12–19, 23–14
Pts: Huang P.W. 19; Rebs: Chen K.C. 8 Asts: Chien C.Y. 5		Pts: Orazov 17; Rebs: Dynnik 11; Asts: Yagodkin, Verechshagin 2

May 22 Stadium, Sana'a
Referees: Sharad Vasant Bansode (IND), Ricor Buaron (PHI), Salah Al-Humaihim (KSA)

September 27
13:00

Report

Malaysia	59–92	South Korea
Scoring by quarter: 9–26, 18–22, 16–21, 16–23
Pts: Choo W.H. 18; Rebs: Choo W.H. 12; Asts: Ang 2		Pts: Kim H.J. 16; Rebs: Lee J.H. 7 Asts: Lee Y.D. 6

May 22 Stadium, Sana'a
Referees: Mohammed Al-Saleh (KSA), Rafael Britanico (PHI), Adel Al-Khawlani (YEM)

September 27
15:00

Report

Iran	79–54	Lebanon
Scoring by quarter: 15–11, 21–18, 21–10, 22–15
Pts: Torabikhah 14; Rebs: Mirzaei 7 Asts: Mashayekhi 3		Pts: Ibrahim, Ozeir 19; Rebs: Abi Khers 13; Asts: Kodsi 2

May 22 Stadium, Sana'a
Referees: Anastasios Piloidis (GRE), Wang Mei (CHN), Shigeyuki Arisawa (JPN)

=== Group F ===
Team	Pld	W	L	PF	PA	PD	Pts	Tiebreaker
China	5	5	0	410	282	+128	10	
Philippines	5	3	2	348	335	+13	8	1–1 / 1.083
Yemen	5	3	2	330	318	+12	8	1–1 / 1.022
Japan	5	3	2	339	354	−15	8	1–1 / 0.899
Syria	5	1	4	319	357	−38	6	
Iraq	5	0	5	282	382	−100	5	

September 25
15:00

Report

China	84–49	Iraq
Scoring by quarter: 19–9, 23–6, 21–21, 21–13
Pts: Guo A.L. 16; Rebs: Wang Z.L. 10; Asts: Luo H.C. 10		Pts: Muayad 26; Rebs: Muayad 10; Asts: Mankhi 3

May 22 Stadium, Sana'a
Referees: Anton Kozlov (KAZ), Sharad Vasant Bansode (IND), Yasser Abbas (QAT)

September 25
17:00

Report

Syria	69–77	Japan
Scoring by quarter: 18–11, 17–20, 13–27, 21–19
Pts: Al-Sati 19; Rebs: Al-Sati 14; Asts: Baghajati 2		Pts: Ando 35; Rebs: Sasayama, Minagawa 6 Asts: Sasayama 7

May 22 Stadium, Sana'a
Referees: Rabee Al-Masri (LIB), Rajan Vellingirinathan (IND), Mohammed Al-Saleh (KSA)

September 25
19:00

Report

Philippines	69–76	Yemen
Scoring by quarter: 12–18, 21–21, 20–17, 16–20
Pts: Ravena 17; Rebs: Escoto 2 Asts: Ravena, Banal 2		Pts: Sadaqah 24; Rebs: Najib, Abdullah, Moqbel 3 Asts: Najib, Moqbel 2

May 22 Stadium, Sana'a
Referees: Fedor Dmitriev (BLR), Chan Owe Siong (MAS), Reza Javadi (IRI)

September 26
9:00

Report

Japan	57–75	Philippines
Scoring by quarter: 15–16, 13–28, 15–11, 14–20
Pts: Ando 22; Rebs: Minagawa, Fujita, Takahashi 4 Asts: Minagawa 6		Pts: Ravena 18; Rebs: Rosario, Ferrer 5 Asts: Banal 9

May 22 Stadium, Sana'a
Referees: Verej Abkarian (IRI), Anton Kozlov (KAZ), Sharad Vasant Bansode (IND)

September 26
11:00

Report

Iraq	70–80	Syria
Scoring by quarter: 16–19, 15–25, 12–21, 27–15
Pts: Muayad 23; Rebs: Muayad 9 Asts: Mankhi 8		Pts: Otabachi 27; Rebs: Al-Sati 18; Asts: Sirjieh 11

May 22 Stadium, Sana'a
Referees: Kim Young-Hyun (KOR), Salah Al-Humaihim (KSA), Chan Owe Siong (MAS)

September 26
19:00

Report

Yemen	51–77	China
Scoring by quarter: 16–21, 13–21, 14–19, 8–16
Pts: Sadaqah 13; Rebs: Yaeesh 7 Asts: Najib 4		Pts: Guo A.L. 16; Rebs: Wang Z.L. 12; Asts: Wang Z.R. 3

May 22 Stadium, Sana'a
Referees: Anastasios Piloidis (GRE), Rabee Al-Masri (LIB), Yong Wai Chong (MAS)

September 27
11:00

Report

Philippines	68–59	Iraq
Scoring by quarter: 17–11, 13–20, 22–19, 16–9
Pts: Ravena 23; Rebs: Teng 10; Asts: Ravena 4		Pts: Mankhi, Ali 12; Rebs: Khalil 9 Asts: Mankhi 5

May 22 Stadium, Sana'a
Referees: Paul Skayem (LIB), Rajan Vellingirinathan (IND), Anton Kozlov (KAZ)

September 27
17:00

Report

China	84–59	Japan
Scoring by quarter: 25–16, 13–16, 28–7, 18–20
Pts: Wang Z.L. 22; Rebs: Wang P., Sun T.L. 7 Asts: Luo H.C., Li M.H. 3		Pts: Takahashi 15; Rebs: Kimura 5 Asts: Ando 2

May 22 Stadium, Sana'a
Referees: Verej Abkarian (IRI), Yasser Abbas (QAT), Yong Wai Chong (MAS)

September 27
19:00

Report

Syria	62–67	Yemen
Scoring by quarter: 5–24, 24–11, 13–18, 20–14
Pts: Al-Samman 17; Rebs: Al-Sati 13; Asts: Sounboulian 2		Pts: Yaeesh 25; Rebs: Abdullah 16; Asts: Najib 8

May 22 Stadium, Sana'a
Referees: Kim Yang-Woo (KOR), Reza Javadi (IRI), Fedor Dmitriev (BLR)

== Classification 13th–16th ==
Semifinals
September 25
Sri Lanka	62
Qatar	48
September 25
Saudi Arabia	75
India	89

13th place
September 26
Sri Lanka	34
India	68
15th place
September 26
Qatar	60
Saudi Arabia	89

=== Semifinals ===
September 25
9:00

Report

Sri Lanka	62–48	Qatar
Scoring by quarter: 16–14, 13–9, 16–11, 17–14
Pts: Thevakumar 14; Rebs: Mahawaduge, Rathnayake, Keyser 5 Asts: K. Perera 6		Pts: Al-Kuwari, Ba-Sulaiman 14; Rebs: Al-Hajri 6 Asts: A. Al-Malki, A.R. Al-Malki 1

Balkis Club Court, Sana'a
Referees: Adel Al-Khawlani (YEM), Verej Abkarian (IRI), Kim Young-Hyun (KOR)

September 25
12:00

Report

Saudi Arabia	75–89	India
Scoring by quarter: 18–19, 16–32, 6–18, 35–20
Pts: Abo-Jalas 20; Rebs: Abo-Jalas 14; Asts: Al-Jaizani 2		Pts: Ar. Singh 23; Rebs: Yadav 11; Asts: Ar. Singh 4

Balkis Club Court, Sana'a
Referees: Ricor Buaron (PHI), Kim Yang-Woo (KOR), Shigeyuki Arisawa (JPN)

=== 15th place ===
September 26
9:00

Report

Qatar	60–89	Saudi Arabia
Scoring by quarter: 10–34, 20–17, 16–26, 14–12
Pts: Al-Kuwari 18; Rebs: Al-Jaber 7 Asts: Al-Kuwari 5		Pts: Al-Jaizani 25; Rebs: Abo-Jalas 9 Asts: Al-Muwallad 4

Balkis Club Court, Sana'a
Referees: Nidal Ayian (SYR), Wang Mei (CHN), Sameer Saeed (IRQ)

=== 13th place ===
September 26
12:00

Report

Sri Lanka	34–68	India
Scoring by quarter: 7–24, 9–17, 4–15, 14–12
Pts: Mahawaduge 13; Rebs: Ahamed 9 Asts: Five players 1		Pts: Sharma 19; Rebs: Yadav, Shah 6 Asts: Sharma, Aj. Singh 2

Balkis Club Court, Sana'a
Referees: Kim Yang-Woo (KOR), Samed Noman (YEM), Paul Skayem (LIB)

== Classification 9th–12th ==
Semifinals
September 29
Kazakhstan	67
Iraq	71
September 29
Malaysia	75
Syria	95

9th place
September 30
Iraq	62
Syria	86
11th place
September 30
Kazakhstan	120
Malaysia	51

=== Semifinals ===
September 29
9:00

Report

Kazakhstan	67–71	Iraq
Scoring by quarter: 11–21, 25–18, 15–22, 16–10
Pts: Yagodkin 18; Rebs: Verechshagin 8 Asts: Kurochka 5		Pts: Muayad 21; Rebs: Muayad 9 Asts: Mankhi 6

May 22 Stadium, Sana'a
Referees: Reza Javadi (IRI), Yong Wai Chong (MAS), Mohammed Al-Saleh (KSA)

September 29
11:00

Report

Malaysia	75–95	Syria
Scoring by quarter: 17–24, 24–21, 13–14, 21–36
Pts: Tan W.S. 21; Rebs: Yeo 14; Asts: Ang 7		Pts: Otabachi 22; Rebs: Otabachi 12; Asts: Sirjieh 5

May 22 Stadium, Sana'a
Referees: Wang Mei (CHN), Faez Badahman (YEM), Ricor Buaron (PHI)

=== 11th place ===
September 30
11:00

Report

Kazakhstan	120–51	Malaysia
Scoring by quarter: 19–10, 32–9, 31–25, 38–7
Pts: Yagodkin 28; Rebs: Lapchenko 11; Asts: Raguyev 5		Pts: Choo W.H. 19; Rebs: Ang 5 Asts: Tan H.K., Tong W.K. 2

May 22 Stadium, Sana'a
Referees: Kim Young-Hyun (KOR), Verej Abkarian (IRI), Paul Skayem (LIB)

=== 9th place ===
September 30
9:00

Report

Iraq	62–86	Syria
Scoring by quarter: 14–19, 12–28, 24–14, 12–25
Pts: Ali 16; Rebs: Muayad 8 Asts: Salim 2		Pts: Sirjieh, Al-Sati 19; Rebs: Al-Sati 15; Asts: Otabachi 4

May 22 Stadium, Sana'a
Referees: Shigeyuki Arisawa (JPN), Adel Al-Khawlani (YEM), Yong Wai Chong (MAS)

== Final round ==
Quarterfinals
September 29
Philippines	64
Chinese Taipei	81
September 29
Japan	73
South Korea	86
September 29
Iran	80
Yemen	45
September 29
Lebanon	56
China	87

Semifinals
September 30
Chinese Taipei	68
South Korea	79
September 30
Iran	52
China	63

Final
October 1
South Korea	80
China	103
3rd place
October 1
Chinese Taipei	65
Iran	60

Semifinals
September 30
Philippines (OT)	91
Japan	86
September 30
Yemen (OT)	79
Lebanon	75

5th place
October 1
Philippines	97
Yemen	48
7th place
October 1
Japan	65
Lebanon	67

=== Quarterfinals ===
September 29
13:00

Report

Philippines	64–81	Chinese Taipei
Scoring by quarter: 19–22, 22–16, 8–17, 15–26
Pts: Ravena, Alolino 15; Rebs: Teng 7 Asts: Ravena 2		Pts: Chen Y.C., Hu L.M. 13; Rebs: Hu L.M. 13; Asts: Chien C.Y. 4

May 22 Stadium, Sana'a
Referees: Fedor Dmitriev (BLR), Nidal Ayian (SYR), Samed Noman (YEM)

September 29
15:00

Report

Japan	73–86	South Korea
Scoring by quarter: 13–25, 20–17, 18–16, 22–28
Pts: Ando 29; Rebs: Ando 8 Asts: Ando 3		Pts: Lee Y.D. 19; Rebs: Lee S.H. 9 Asts: Han S.H. 4

May 22 Stadium, Sana'a
Referees: Rabee Al-Masri (LIB), Anton Kozlov (KAZ), Chan Owe Siong (MAS)

September 29
17:00

Report

Lebanon	56–87	China
Scoring by quarter: 14–24, 14–23, 16–25, 12–15
Pts: Mechref 15; Rebs: Bechara 11; Asts: Al-Amine 4		Pts: Guo A.L. 17; Rebs: Li M.H. 9 Asts: Sun T.L. 7

May 22 Stadium, Sana'a
Referees: Toru Katayose (JPN), Sameer Saeed (IRQ), Sharad Vasant Bansode (IND)

September 29
19:00

Report

Iran	80–45	Yemen
Scoring by quarter: 16–16, 24–9, 18–8, 24–12
Pts: Mashayekhi 21; Rebs: Moradinasab 9 Asts: Mashayekhi 4		Pts: Abdullah 13; Rebs: Yaeesh, Abdullah 9 Asts: Sadaqah 4

May 22 Stadium, Sana'a
Referees: Anastasios Piloidis (GRE), Yasser Abbas (QAT), Rajan Vellingirinathan (IND)

=== Semifinals 5th–8th ===
September 30
13:00

Report

Philippines	91–86 (OT)	Japan
Scoring by quarter: 14–22, 16–14, 25–25, 27–21, Overtime: 9–4
Pts: Ravena 37; Rebs: Escoto 12; Asts: Ravena 3		Pts: Ando 22; Rebs: Hareyama 10; Asts: Sasayama 5

May 22 Stadium, Sana'a
Referees: Reza Javadi (IRI), Salah Al-Humaihim (KSA), Rajan Vellingirinathan (IND)

September 30
15:00

Report

Yemen	79–75 (OT)	Lebanon
Scoring by quarter: 17–21, 20–14, 14–18, 17–15, Overtime: 11–7
Pts: Yaeesh 31; Rebs: Abdullah 17; Asts: Yaeesh 6		Pts: Ozeir 17; Rebs: Mechref 10; Asts: Kodsi 3

May 22 Stadium, Sana'a
Referees: Wang Xiaochun (CHN), Chan Owe Siong (MAS), Kim Yang-Woo (KOR)

=== Semifinals ===
September 30
17:00

Report

Chinese Taipei	68–79	South Korea
Scoring by quarter: 19–16, 16–18, 10–23, 23–22
Pts: Hu L.M. 25; Rebs: Hu L.M. 8 Asts: Chien C.Y., Chen Y.C., Chien W.J. 2		Pts: Kim G.Y. 19; Rebs: Lee S.H. 14; Asts: Han S.H., Kim G.Y. 4

May 22 Stadium, Sana'a
Referees: Anastasios Piloidis (GRE), Sharad Vasant Bansode (IND), Yasser Abbas (QAT)

September 30
19:00

Report

Iran	52–63	China
Scoring by quarter: 10–11, 12–16, 15–20, 15–16
Pts: Mohammadi 9 Rebs: Abdollahi 6 Asts: Four players 1		Pts: Zhu X.H. 22; Rebs: Sun T.L. 7 Asts: Luo H.C., Guo A.L. 3

May 22 Stadium, Sana'a
Referees: Fedor Dmitriev (BLR), Anton Kozlov (KAZ), Rafael Britanico (PHI)

=== 7th place ===
October 1
13:00

Report

Japan	65–67	Lebanon
Scoring by quarter: 20–19, 11–17, 24–10, 10–21
Pts: Mitsuyama 20; Rebs: Minagawa 8 Asts: Ando 3		Pts: Mechref 20; Rebs: Abi Khers 12; Asts: Mechref 2

May 22 Stadium, Sana'a
Referees: Rafael Britanico (PHI), Anton Kozlov (KAZ), Chan Owe Siong (MAS)

=== 5th place ===
October 1
15:00

Report

Philippines	97–48	Yemen
Scoring by quarter: 22–10, 25–16, 34–12, 16–10
Pts: Alolino 18; Rebs: Banal 9 Asts: Alolino 8		Pts: Sadaqah 16; Rebs: Yousef 6 Asts: Najib 4

May 22 Stadium, Sana'a
Referees: Toru Katayose (JPN), Sharad Vasant Bansode (IND), Wang Mei (CHN)

=== 3rd place ===
October 1
17:00

Report

Chinese Taipei	65–60	Iran
Scoring by quarter: 17–13, 17–17, 14–5, 17–25
Pts: Hung K.C. 18; Rebs: Chien W.J. 9 Asts: Chien C.Y., Li C.C. 2		Pts: Torabikhah 13; Rebs: Hadizadeh 12; Asts: Mashayekhi, Omari 2

May 22 Stadium, Sana'a
Referees: Anastasios Piloidis (GRE), Rajan Vellingirinathan (IND), Yasser Abbas (QAT)

=== Final ===
October 1
19:00

Report

South Korea	80–103	China
Scoring by quarter: 21–23, 13–26, 21–29, 25–25
Pts: Kim G.Y. 29; Rebs: Lee Y.D. 9 Asts: Kim G.Y., Moon S.G. 3		Pts: Guo A.L. 28; Rebs: Wang Z.L. 19; Asts: Guo A.L., Wang Z.L. 4

May 22 Stadium, Sana'a
Referees: Fedor Dmitriev (BLR), Reza Javadi (IRI), Rabee Al-Masri (LIB)

== Final standing ==
Qualified for the 2011 FIBA Under-19 World Championship

Rank	Team	Record
1st place, gold medalist(s)	China	9–0
2nd place, silver medalist(s)	South Korea	7–2
3rd place, bronze medalist(s)	Chinese Taipei	6–3
4	Iran	6–3
5	Philippines	6–3
6	Yemen	5–4
7	Lebanon	4–5
8	Japan	4–5
9	Syria	4–4
10	Iraq	2–6
11	Kazakhstan	4–4
12	Malaysia	1–7
13	India	2–3
14	Sri Lanka	1–4
15	Saudi Arabia	1–4
16	Qatar	0–5

== Awards ==
2010 Asian Under-18 champions

China
Ninth title
