= 2008 FIBA Asia Under-18 Championship =

20th FIBA Under-18 Asian Basketball Championship
- Official logo of the 2008 FIBA Asia Under-18 Championship

Tournament details
- Host country: Iran
- City: Tehran
- Dates: August 28 – September 5
- Teams: 15 (from 1 confederation)
- Venue: 1 (in 1 host city)

Final positions
- Champions: Iran (2nd title)
- Runners-up: Kazakhstan
- Third place: Syria

Official website
- 2008 FIBA Asia U-18 Championship

The 2008 FIBA Asia Under-18 Championship was the 20th edition of the FIBA Asia's youth basketball championship. The games were played in Tehran, Iran, from August 28 to September 5, 2008.

The top three teams qualified for the 2009 FIBA Under-19 World Championship.

== Qualification ==
According to the FIBA Asia rules, each zone had two places, and the hosts (Iran) and holders (China) were automatically qualified. The other four places are allocated to the zones according to performance in the 2006 FIBA Asia Under-18 Championship.

| East Asia (1+2+2) | European Gulf (2) | Middle Asia (2+1) | Southeast Asia (2) | West Asia (1+2+1) |
|---|---|---|---|---|
| China | Saudi Arabia | Kazakhstan | Philippines | Iran |
| Chinese Taipei | United Arab Emirates | India | Malaysia | Syria |
| Hong Kong | | Uzbekistan | | Lebanon |
| Japan | | | | Jordan |
| South Korea | | | | |

== Draw ==
| Group A | Group B | Group C | Group D |
|---|---|---|---|
| China; Japan; Hong Kong; India | South Korea; Saudi Arabia; Kazakhstan; Jordan | Chinese Taipei; Lebanon; Philippines; United Arab Emirates | ~~Turkey~~ * Syria; Malaysia; Iran |

* Turkey withdrew from the tournament.

== Preliminary round ==
=== Group A ===
| Team | Pld | W | L | PF | PA | PD | Pts |
|---|---|---|---|---|---|---|---|
| China | 3 | 3 | 0 | 332 | 169 | +163 | 6 |
| Japan | 3 | 2 | 1 | 257 | 250 | +7 | 5 |
| India | 3 | 1 | 2 | 230 | 258 | −28 | 4 |
| Hong Kong | 3 | 0 | 3 | 185 | 327 | −142 | 3 |

August 28
9:00

| China | 115–61 | Hong Kong |
Scoring by quarter: 27–15, 28–7, 33–20, 27–19
| Pts: Li X.X. 17; Rebs: Li X.X., Wang Z. 11; Asts: Yu S.L., Cao F. 4 | | Pts: Chow K.W. 24; Rebs: Chow K.W. 13; Asts: Lau T.L., Chow K.W. 2 |

Azadi Basketball Hall, Tehran
Referees: Naser Abu Rashed (JOR), Reza Javadi (IRI), Hussain Al-Bloushi (UAE)

August 28
15:00

| Japan | 96–71 | India |
Scoring by quarter: 22–30, 21–12, 23–17, 30–12
| Pts: Tateyama 21; Rebs: Tateyama 9 Asts: Ishikawa 5 | | Pts: Bhriguvanshi 22; Rebs: Pethani 12; Asts: P. Singh 4 |

Azadi Basketball Hall, Tehran
Referees: Anthony Sulit (PHI), Ayman Al-Momani (JOR), Wong Chung Min (MAS)

August 29
11:00

| Hong Kong | 60–102 | Japan |
Scoring by quarter: 11–22, 16–17, 16–35, 17–28
| Pts: Chow K.W. 23; Rebs: Chow K.W. 13; Asts: Chow K.W. 3 | | Pts: Ishikawa 17; Rebs: Nagayoshi 8 Asts: Ishikawa 6 |

Azadi Basketball Hall, Tehran
Referees: J. Abdullah, Shahram Parniak (IRI), Huang Yi-chi (TPE)

August 29
15:00

| India | 49–98 | China |
Scoring by quarter: 18–31, 7–20, 13–24, 11–23
| Pts: Rathore 12 | | Pts: Wang Z. 25 |

Azadi Basketball Hall, Tehran

August 30
9:00

| China | 119–59 | Japan |
Scoring by quarter: 23–18, 33–2, 32–18, 31–21
| Pts: Ren J.F. 22; Rebs: Li X.X. 12; Asts: Cao F. 6 | | Pts: Nagayoshi 15; Rebs: Hiejima 7 Asts: Karino, Ishikawa 2 |

Azadi Basketball Hall, Tehran
Referees: Mohammad Al-Amiri (KUW), Hassan Nikkhah (IRI), Arsen Andryushkin (KAZ)

August 30
13:00

| Hong Kong | 64–110 | India |
Scoring by quarter: 20–25, 13–30, 13–32, 18–23
| Pts: Chow K.W. 17; Rebs: Lau T.L. 10; Asts: Five players 1 | | Pts: Bhriguvanshi 25; Rebs: Rathee 8 Asts: Shakya 9 |

Azadi Basketball Hall, Tehran
Referees: Amir Hossein Safarzadeh (IRI), Ahmed Ghanem (EGY), Mohammad Doust (IRI)

=== Group B ===
| Team | Pld | W | L | PF | PA | PD | Pts |
|---|---|---|---|---|---|---|---|
| South Korea | 3 | 3 | 0 | 246 | 228 | +18 | 6 |
| Kazakhstan | 3 | 2 | 1 | 264 | 216 | +48 | 5 |
| Jordan | 3 | 1 | 2 | 258 | 262 | −4 | 4 |
| Saudi Arabia | 3 | 0 | 3 | 252 | 314 | −62 | 3 |

August 28
11:00

| Saudi Arabia | 83–110 | Jordan |
Scoring by quarter: 16–38, 21–24, 25–30, 21–18
| Pts: Fallatah 19; Rebs: Abuswyhel 6 Asts: Abuswyhel 6 | | Pts: L. Obeidi 37; Rebs: Shaneik 14; Asts: Shaneik 3 |

Azadi Basketball Hall, Tehran
Referees: Qiao Longsheng (CHN), Huang Yi-chi (TPE), Jafar Mohammadpour (IRI)

August 28
13:00

| South Korea | 65–62 | Kazakhstan |
Scoring by quarter: 15–12, 21–21, 12–18, 17–11
| Pts: Lim J.I. 19; Rebs: Lee S. 13; Asts: Jang J.S., Yoo B.H. 3 | | Pts: Ledovskikh 17; Rebs: Akhmet 10; Asts: Ismail, Ledovskikh 2 |

Azadi Basketball Hall, Tehran
Referees: J. Abdullah, Takeo Kitazawa (JPN), Nazir Al-Saudi (LIB)

August 29
9:00

| Jordan | 69–78 | South Korea |
Scoring by quarter: 22–23, 9–20, 15–19, 23–16
| Pts: L. Obeidi 32; Rebs: Abu Qamar 14; Asts: L. Obeidi 3 | | Pts: Lim J.I. 29; Rebs: Jang J.S., Lee S. 9 Asts: Yoo B.H. 7 |

Azadi Basketball Hall, Tehran
Referees: Aleksandr Gorshkov (RUS), Anthony Sulit (PHI), Jafar Mohammadpour (IRI)

August 29
13:00

| Kazakhstan | 101–72 | Saudi Arabia |
Scoring by quarter: 23–15, 26–12, 29–29, 23–16
| Pts: Akhmet 30; Rebs: Tyutyunik 11; Asts: Ledovskikh 6 | | Pts: Bin Mohammed 25; Rebs: J. Al-Dosari 6 Asts: Abuswyhel 4 |

Azadi Basketball Hall, Tehran
Referees: Nobuyasu Aibara (JPN), Hassan Nikkhah (IRI), Salem Al-Zaabi (UAE)

August 30
11:00

| Kazakhstan | 101–79 | Jordan |
Scoring by quarter: 27–25, 29–21, 24–13, 21–20
| Pts: Arsenyev 25; Rebs: Akhmet 13; Asts: Arsenyev 5 | | Pts: Abu Qamar 24; Rebs: Abu Qamar 11; Asts: Katami 4 |

Azadi Basketball Hall, Tehran
Referees: Ivan Zachara (CZE), Anthony Sulit (PHI), Takeo Kitazawa (JPN)

August 30
15:00

| South Korea | 103–97 (OT) | Saudi Arabia |
Scoring by quarter: 21–19, 22–21, 22–22, 19–22, Overtime: 19–13
| Pts: Park J.H. 20; Rebs: Lim J.I. 20; Asts: Lim J.S., Yoo B.H. 3 | | Pts: Abuswyhel 22; Rebs: Al-Subaie 9 Asts: Bin Mohammed 5 |

Azadi Basketball Hall, Tehran
Referees: Nazir Al-Saudi (LIB), Hussain Al-Bloushi (UAE), Mohammad Al-Fakhouri (SYR)

=== Group C ===
| Team | Pld | W | L | PF | PA | PD | Pts |
|---|---|---|---|---|---|---|---|
| Lebanon | 3 | 3 | 0 | 258 | 225 | +33 | 6 |
| Philippines | 3 | 2 | 1 | 263 | 246 | +17 | 5 |
| Chinese Taipei | 3 | 1 | 2 | 274 | 255 | +19 | 4 |
| United Arab Emirates | 3 | 0 | 3 | 169 | 238 | −69 | 3 |

August 28
20:00

| Chinese Taipei | 105–106 (2OT) | Philippines |
Scoring by quarter: 16–28, 18–17, 26–21, 28–22, Overtime: 8–8, 9–10
| Pts: Chou P.C. 35; Rebs: Lin W.H. 9 Asts: Lin W.H. 3 | | Pts: Garcia, Banal 18; Rebs: Garcia 10; Asts: Wright 4 |

Azadi Basketball Hall, Tehran
Referees: Aleksandr Gorshkov (RUS), Mohammad Al-Fakhouri (SYR), Arsen Andryushkin (KAZ)

August 28
22:00

| Lebanon | 76–61 | United Arab Emirates |
Scoring by quarter: 25–9, 11–9, 22–20, 18–23
| Pts: Ibrahim 23; Rebs: Khoury 20; Asts: Zaloum 7 | | Pts: Khalifa 15; Rebs: Omar, Mohamed 9 Asts: Khalifa 4 |

Azadi Basketball Hall, Tehran
Referees: Amir Hossein Safarzadeh (IRI), Ahmed Ghanem (EGY), Rajnarayan Patro (IND)

August 29
19:00

| Philippines | 84–87 | Lebanon |
Scoring by quarter: 22–21, 23–18, 21–22, 18–26
| Pts: Garcia 28; Rebs: Mendoza, Torres 7 Asts: Marata 3 | | Pts: El-Nar 32; Rebs: Maatouk, Aoun 10; Asts: Akl 6 |

Azadi Basketball Hall, Tehran
Referees: Ivan Zachara (CZE), Qiao Longsheng (CHN), Takeo Kitazawa (JPN)

August 29
21:00

| United Arab Emirates | 54–89 | Chinese Taipei |
Scoring by quarter: 17–23, 18–28, 8–17, 11–21
| Pts: Khalifa 19; Rebs: Mohamed 11; Asts: Khalifa 2 | | Pts: Lee M.H. 18; Rebs: Chanj P.W., Chunj H.N. 6 Asts: Lin L.J. 3 |

Azadi Basketball Hall, Tehran
Referees: Amir Hossein Safarzadeh (IRI), Andy Cheung (HKG), Naser Abu Rashed (JOR)

August 30
19:00

| Chinese Taipei | 80–95 | Lebanon |
Scoring by quarter: 19–29, 14–17, 23–28, 24–21
| Pts: Lin L.J., Lee M.H. 19; Rebs: Chou P.C. 7 Asts: Lee M.H. 4 | | Pts: Ibrahim 33; Rebs: Aoun 11; Asts: Zaloum 4 |

Azadi Basketball Hall, Tehran
Referees: J. Abdullah, Reza Javadi (IRI), Ayman Al-Momani (JOR)

August 30
21:00

| Philippines | 73–54 | United Arab Emirates |
Scoring by quarter: 22–10, 19–14, 17–8, 15–22
| Pts: Marata 16; Rebs: Torres 7 Asts: de Guzman, Torres 3 | | Pts: Khalifa 23; Rebs: Khalid 7 Asts: Khalifa 2 |

Azadi Basketball Hall, Tehran
Referees: Naser Abu Rashed (JOR), Nobuyasu Aibara (JPN), Rajnarayan Patro (IND)

=== Group D ===
| Team | Pld | W | L | PF | PA | PD | Pts |
|---|---|---|---|---|---|---|---|
| Iran | 2 | 2 | 0 | 202 | 134 | +68 | 4 |
| Syria | 2 | 1 | 1 | 173 | 163 | +10 | 3 |
| Malaysia | 2 | 0 | 2 | 124 | 202 | −78 | 2 |

August 28
18:00

| Malaysia | 61–102 | Iran |
Scoring by quarter: 20–24, 21–26, 19–23, 1–29
| Pts: Ong C.K. 16; Rebs: Kwaan Y.J. 7 Asts: Ma C.K., Te K.L. 2 | | Pts: Farman 25; Rebs: Hassanzadeh 13; Asts: Amjad 7 |

Azadi Basketball Hall, Tehran
Referees: Ivan Zachara (CZE), Nobuyasu Aibara (JPN), Liang Bing (CHN)

August 29
17:00

| Syria | 100–63 | Malaysia |
Scoring by quarter: 21–14, 21–15, 28–16, 30–18
| Pts: Al-Sebaay, Gneed 17; Rebs: Osfira 14; Asts: Al-Shatti 3 | | Pts: Ong C.K. 25; Rebs: Kwaan Y.J. 11; Asts: Ong C.K. 2 |

Azadi Basketball Hall, Tehran
Referees: Mohammad Al-Amiri (KUW), Arsen Andryushkin (KAZ), Rajnarayan Patro (IND)

August 30
17:00

| Iran | 100–73 | Syria |
Scoring by quarter: 24–15, 25–13, 25–22, 26–23
| Pts: Hassanzadeh 26; Rebs: Hassanzadeh 17; Asts: Honarmand 6 | | Pts: Al-Sebaay 16; Rebs: Abdulnour 7 Asts: Gneed 4 |

Azadi Basketball Hall, Tehran
Referees: Aleksandr Gorshkov (RUS), Andy Cheung (HKG), Liang Bing (CHN)

== Quarterfinal round ==
=== Group I ===
| Team | Pld | W | L | PF | PA | PD | Pts | Tiebreaker |
|---|---|---|---|---|---|---|---|---|
| Kazakhstan | 3 | 2 | 1 | 253 | 281 | −28 | 5 | |
| Syria | 3 | 1 | 2 | 181 | 173 | +8 | 4 | 1–1 / 1.111 |
| China | 3 | 2 | 1 | 198 | 158 | +40 | 4 | 1–1 / 1.074 |
| Lebanon | 3 | 1 | 2 | 267 | 287 | −20 | 4 | 1–1 / 0.906 |

August 31
15:00

| China | 0–20 | Syria |
Scoring by quarter: 25–17, 17–18, 4–6
Forfeit
| Pts: Li X.X. 14; Rebs: Li X.X 9 Asts: Yu S.L. 4 | | Pts: Al-Jabe 18; Rebs: Gneed 5 Asts: Diarbakrly 2 |

Azadi Basketball Hall, Tehran
Referees: Anthony Sulit (PHI), Andy Cheung (HKG), Naser Abu Rashed (JOR)

August 31
19:00

| Kazakhstan | 106–103 (2OT) | Lebanon |
Scoring by quarter: 20–22, 11–22, 29–19, 22–19, Overtime: 10–10, 14–11
| Pts: Arsenyev 30; Rebs: Akhmet 18; Asts: Ismail, Ledovskikh 3 | | Pts: Ibrahim 49; Rebs: Khoury 9 Asts: Akl 5 |

Azadi Basketball Hall, Tehran
Referees: Aleksandr Gorshkov (RUS), Hassan Nikkhah (IRI), Shahram Parniak (IRI)

September 1
15:00

| Lebanon | 74–101 | China |
Scoring by quarter: 21–29, 13–19, 18–22, 22–31
| Pts: Ibrahim 34; Rebs: Ibrahim 6 Asts: Akl 4 | | Pts: Li X.X. 27; Rebs: Li X.X. 10; Asts: Zhao H.W. 7 |

Azadi Basketball Hall, Tehran
Referees: J. Abdullah, Reza Javadi (IRI), Nobuyasu Aibara (JPN)

September 1
21:00

| Syria | 81–83 | Kazakhstan |
Scoring by quarter: 19–18, 17–15, 22–32, 23–18
| Pts: Gneed 22; Rebs: Sder 10; Asts: Bawadekji, Al-Samman 3 | | Pts: Arsenyev 28; Rebs: Akhmet 12; Asts: Ismail 6 |

Azadi Basketball Hall, Tehran
Referees: Ivan Zachara (CZE), Takeo Kitazawa (JPN), Amir Hossein Safarzadeh (IRI)

September 2
15:00

| China | 97–64 | Kazakhstan |
Scoring by quarter: 21–9, 26–28, 20–16, 30–11
| Pts: Liu S.N. 25; Rebs: Dong H.L. 12; Asts: Ren J.W. 3 | | Pts: Arsenyev 17; Rebs: Zhigulin 6 Asts: Ledovskikh 3 |

Azadi Basketball Hall, Tehran
Referees: Mohammad Al-Amiri (KUW), Takeo Kitazawa (JPN), Ayman Al-Momani (JOR)

September 2
21:00

| Lebanon | 90–80 | Syria |
Scoring by quarter: 30–20, 15–17, 21–19, 24–24
| Pts: Ibrahim 34; Rebs: Ibrahim 9 Asts: Maatouk, Aoun, Akl 2 | | Pts: Bawadekji 25; Rebs: Sder 10; Asts: Al-Jabe, Al-Sebaay 2 |

Azadi Basketball Hall, Tehran
Referees: Aleksandr Gorshkov (RUS), Nobuyasu Aibara (JPN), Amir Hossein Safarzadeh (IRI)

- China forfeited the game against Syria after they walked out while leading 46–41 in the 3rd quarter.

=== Group II ===
| Team | Pld | W | L | PF | PA | PD | Pts | Tiebreaker |
|---|---|---|---|---|---|---|---|---|
| Iran | 3 | 2 | 1 | 280 | 255 | +25 | 5 | 1–0 |
| Japan | 3 | 2 | 1 | 258 | 264 | −6 | 5 | 0–1 |
| South Korea | 3 | 1 | 2 | 252 | 246 | +6 | 4 | 1–0 |
| Philippines | 3 | 1 | 2 | 243 | 268 | −25 | 4 | 0–1 |

August 31
17:00

| Japan | 91–111 | Iran |
Scoring by quarter: 21–24, 25–29, 17–25, 28–33
| Pts: Karino 23; Rebs: Nagayoshi 11; Asts: Ishikawa 8 | | Pts: Salmani 22; Rebs: Hassanzadeh 22; Asts: Falahat 8 |

Azadi Basketball Hall, Tehran
Referees: J. Abdullah, Hussain Al-Bloushi (UAE), Nazir Al-Saudi (LIB)

August 31
21:00

| South Korea | 98–80 | Philippines |
Scoring by quarter: 24–23, 26–16, 23–18, 25–23
| Pts: Lim J.I. 23; Rebs: Lim J.I. 6 Asts: Yoo B.H. 6 | | Pts: Garcia, Mendoza 14; Rebs: Torres 10; Asts: Wright 4 |

Azadi Basketball Hall, Tehran
Referees: Ivan Zachara (CZE), Mohammad Al-Amiri (KUW), Andy Cheung (HKG)

September 1
17:00

| Iran | 85–79 | South Korea |
Scoring by quarter: 14–22, 12–17, 29–22, 30–18
| Pts: Salmani 20; Rebs: Hassanzadeh 19; Asts: Falahat 7 | | Pts: Park J.H. 23; Rebs: Lee S. 12; Asts: Yoo B.H. 4 |

Azadi Basketball Hall, Tehran
Referees: Aleksandr Gorshkov (RUS), Hussain Al-Bloushi (UAE), Rajnarayan Patro (IND)

September 1
19:00

| Philippines | 78–86 | Japan |
Scoring by quarter: 18–21, 21–25, 20–18, 19–22
| Pts: Torres 24; Rebs: Torres 10; Asts: Garcia, Tolentino 3 | | Pts: Karino 25; Rebs: Nagayoshi 8 Asts: Ishikawa 8 |

Azadi Basketball Hall, Tehran
Referees: Mohammad Al-Amiri (KUW), Andy Cheung (HKG), Nazir Al-Saudi (LIB)

September 2
17:00

| Philippines | 85–84 | Iran |
Scoring by quarter: 15–19, 20–16, 17–22, 33–27
| Pts: Wright 13; Rebs: Torres 10; Asts: de Guzman 4 | | Pts: Farman 19; Rebs: Hassanzadeh 19; Asts: Honarmand 4 |

Azadi Basketball Hall, Tehran
Referees: Ivan Zachara (CZE), Naser Abu Rashed (JOR), Hussain Al-Bloushi (UAE)

September 2
19:00

| Japan | 81–75 | South Korea |
Scoring by quarter: 17–25, 14–12, 27–17, 23–21
| Pts: Hiejima 26; Rebs: Taniguchi 9 Asts: Hiejima, Ishikawa 6 | | Pts: Park K.S. 22; Rebs: Lee S. 15; Asts: Park K.S., Yoo B.H. 2 |

Azadi Basketball Hall, Tehran
Referees: J. Abdullah, Qiao Longsheng (CHN), Huang Yi-chi (TPE)

=== Group III ===
| Team | Pld | W | L | PF | PA | PD | Pts |
|---|---|---|---|---|---|---|---|
| Chinese Taipei | 2 | 2 | 0 | 204 | 178 | +26 | 4 |
| Saudi Arabia | 2 | 1 | 1 | 171 | 186 | −15 | 3 |
| India | 2 | 0 | 2 | 163 | 174 | −11 | 2 |

August 31
9:00

| Saudi Arabia | 92–109 | Chinese Taipei |
Scoring by quarter: 12–31, 18–31, 25–27, 37–20
| Pts: Abuswyhel 32; Rebs: Al-Subaie 9 Asts: Abuswyhel 4 | | Pts: Chanj P.W., Lin L.J. 18; Rebs: Lin Y.H. 9 Asts: Lai K.W. 7 |

Azadi Basketball Hall, Tehran
Referees: Nobuyasu Aibara (JPN), Qiao Longsheng (CHN), Salem Al-Zaabi (UAE)

September 1
11:00

| Chinese Taipei | 95–86 | India |
Scoring by quarter: 24–25, 24–21, 24–19, 23–21
| Pts: Chou P.C. 31; Rebs: Chou P.C. 8 Asts: Lai K.W., Lee M.H., Lin W.H. 2 | | Pts: Bhriguvanshi 32; Rebs: Shakya 8 Asts: Shakya, A. Singh 2 |

Azadi Basketball Hall, Tehran
Referees: Naser Abu Rashed (JOR), Mohammad Al-Fakhouri (SYR), Ayman Al-Momani (JOR)

September 2
23:00

| India | 77–79 | Saudi Arabia |
Scoring by quarter: 19–17, 16–18, 18–20, 24–24
| Pts: Rathore 19; Rebs: Rathore 14; Asts: Pal 4 | | Pts: Abuswyhel 24; Rebs: Abuswyhel 6 Asts: Five players 1 |

Azadi Basketball Hall, Tehran
Referees: Reza Javadi (IRI), Andy Cheung (HKG), Salem Al-Zaabi (UAE)

=== Group IV ===
| Team | Pld | W | L | PF | PA | PD | Pts |
|---|---|---|---|---|---|---|---|
| Jordan | 3 | 3 | 0 | 246 | 174 | +72 | 6 |
| Hong Kong | 3 | 2 | 1 | 210 | 226 | −16 | 5 |
| United Arab Emirates | 3 | 1 | 2 | 204 | 239 | −35 | 4 |
| Malaysia | 3 | 0 | 3 | 233 | 254 | −21 | 3 |

August 31
11:00

| Hong Kong | 85–82 | Malaysia |
Scoring by quarter: 21–18, 22–27, 20–16, 22–21
| Pts: Chow K.W. 29; Rebs: Lau H.T. 10; Asts: Yan S.C. 3 | | Pts: Ong C.K. 29; Rebs: Kuek T.Y., Tan C.K. 8 Asts: Te K.L. 4 |

Azadi Basketball Hall, Tehran
Referees: Takeo Kitazawa (JPN), Huang Yi-chi (TPE), Jafar Mohammadpour (IRI)

August 31
13:00

| Jordan | 88–49 | United Arab Emirates |
Scoring by quarter: 25–9, 23–17, 24–11, 16–12
| Pts: Shaneik 29; Rebs: Abu Qamar 14; Asts: Katami, Abu Qamar 3 | | Pts: Khalifa 15; Rebs: Omar 8 Asts: Khalid 2 |

Azadi Basketball Hall, Tehran
Referees: Amir Hossein Safarzadeh (IRI), Liang Bing (CHN), Mohammad Al-Fakhouri (SYR)

September 1
9:00

| United Arab Emirates | 70–72 (OT) | Hong Kong |
Scoring by quarter: 12–22, 25–4, 13–21, 10–13, Overtime: 10–12
| Pts: Khalifa 27; Rebs: Omar, Khalifa, Mohamed 8 Asts: Khalil, Khalifa 3 | | Pts: Lau H.T. 20; Rebs: Lau H.T. 11; Asts: Yan S.C. 3 |

Azadi Basketball Hall, Tehran
Referees: Liang Bing (CHN), Arsen Andryushkin (KAZ), Ahmed Ghanem (EGY)

September 1
13:00

| Malaysia | 72–84 | Jordan |
Scoring by quarter: 22–18, 14–22, 20–25, 16–19
| Pts: Kwaan Y.J. 27; Rebs: Kuek T.Y. 12; Asts: Ong C.K. 3 | | Pts: L. Obeidi 35; Rebs: Abu Qamar 23; Asts: L. Obeidi 5 |

Azadi Basketball Hall, Tehran
Referees: Qiao Longsheng (CHN), Hassan Nikkhah (IRI), Mohammad Doust (IRI)

September 2
11:00

| Hong Kong | 53–74 | Jordan |
Scoring by quarter: 11–31, 9–14, 13–17, 20–12
| Pts: Chow K.W. 17; Rebs: Chow K.W. 15; Asts: Lau T.L. 2 | | Pts: Abu Qamar 23; Rebs: Abu Qamar 16; Asts: Shaneik 6 |

Azadi Basketball Hall, Tehran
Referees: Arsen Andryushkin (KAZ), Mohammad Al-Fakhouri (SYR), Anthony Sulit (PHI)

September 2
13:00

| United Arab Emirates | 85–79 | Malaysia |
Scoring by quarter: 24–20, 17–13, 22–31, 22–15
| Pts: Khalifa 22; Rebs: Omar 10; Asts: Khalil 3 | | Pts: Gan H.H. 20; Rebs: Tan C.K. 11; Asts: Ong C.K. 3 |

Azadi Basketball Hall, Tehran
Referees: Hassan Nikkhah (IRI), Shahram Parniak (IRI), Liang Bing (CHN)

== Classification 9th–14th ==
=== 13th place ===
September 3
22:00

| India | 78–75 | United Arab Emirates |
Scoring by quarter: 20–19, 23–21, 12–20, 23–15
| Pts: Bhriguvanshi 24; Rebs: A. Singh 9 Asts: A. Singh 3 | | Pts: Khalifa 30; Rebs: Omar 8 Asts: Khalifa 5 |

Azadi Basketball Hall, Tehran
Referees: Ahmed Ghanem (EGY), Jafar Mohammadpour (IRI), Ayman Al-Momani (JOR)

=== 11th place ===
September 4
21:00

| Saudi Arabia | 86–75 | Hong Kong |
Scoring by quarter: 18–19, 21–11, 20–32, 27–13
| Pts: Bin Mohammed 18; Rebs: Bin Mohammed 11; Asts: Fallatah 4 | | Pts: Chow K.W. 23; Rebs: Chow K.W. 16; Asts: Four players 2 |

Azadi Basketball Hall, Tehran
Referees: Nobuyasu Aibara (JPN), Mohammad Al-Fakhouri (SYR), Mohammad Doust (IRI)

=== 9th place ===
September 4
11:00

| Chinese Taipei | 102–89 | Jordan |
Scoring by quarter: 26–21, 12–19, 30–33, 34–16
| Pts: Lee M.H. 26 | | Pts: L. Obeidi 31 |

Azadi Basketball Hall, Tehran
Referees: Takeo Kitazawa (JPN), Hussain Al-Bloushi (UAE), Arsen Andryushkin (KAZ)

== Classification 5th–8th ==
Semifinals
September 4
China | 86
Philippines | 63
September 4
South Korea | 93
Lebanon | 72

5th place
September 5
China | 106
South Korea | 97
7th place
September 5
Philippines | 74
Lebanon | 63

=== Semifinals ===
September 4
13:00

| China | 86–63 | Philippines |
Scoring by quarter: 17–11, 21–21, 28–18, 20–13
| Pts: Ren J.F. 27; Rebs: Wang Z. 16; Asts: Ren J.F. 4 | | Pts: Wright 16; Rebs: Sangalang, Golla, Torres 5 Asts: Wright 2 |

Azadi Basketball Hall, Tehran
Referees: J. Abdullah, Reza Javadi (IRI), Hassan Nikkhah (IRI)

September 4
15:00

| South Korea | 93–72 | Lebanon |
Scoring by quarter: 23–15, 25–7, 21–25, 24–25
| Pts: Park K.S. 21; Rebs: Lee S. 10; Asts: Yoo B.H. 5 | | Pts: Khoury 18; Rebs: Khoury 12; Asts: Zaloum 5 |

Azadi Basketball Hall, Tehran
Referees: Mohammad Al-Amiri (KUW), Qiao Longsheng (CHN), Naser Abu Rashed (JOR)

=== 7th place ===
September 5
11:00

| Philippines | 74–63 | Lebanon |
Scoring by quarter: 17–18, 23–16, 12–14, 22–15
| Pts: de Guzman 15 | | Pts: Ibrahim 14 |

Azadi Basketball Hall, Tehran
Referees: Andy Cheung (HKG), Takeo Kitazawa (JPN), Rajnarayan Patro (IND)

=== 5th place ===
September 5
15:00

| China | 106–97 | South Korea |
Scoring by quarter: 19–19, 24–24, 34–23, 29–31
| Pts: Cao F. 23 | | Pts: Lim J.I. 27 |

Azadi Basketball Hall, Tehran
Referees: Reza Javadi (IRI), Naser Abu Rashed (JOR), Nazir Al-Saudi (LIB)

== Final round ==
Semifinals
September 4
Iran | 80
Syria | 78
September 4
Japan | 78
Kazakhstan | 103

Final
September 5
Iran | 95
Kazakhstan | 76
3rd place
September 5
Syria | 93
Japan | 86

=== Semifinals ===
September 4
17:00

| Iran | 80–78 | Syria |
Scoring by quarter: 21–23, 23–15, 23–26, 13–14
| Pts: Hassanzadeh 27; Rebs: Hassanzadeh 24; Asts: Honarmand 5 | | Pts: Bawadekji 22; Rebs: Sder 8 Asts: Al-Samman 3 |

Azadi Basketball Hall, Tehran
Referees: Aleksandr Gorshkov (RUS), Anthony Sulit (PHI), Andy Cheung (HKG)

September 4
19:00

| Japan | 78–103 | Kazakhstan |
Scoring by quarter: 20–22, 17–22, 22–30, 19–29
| Pts: Hiejima 23; Rebs: Nagayoshi 9 Asts: Hiejima, Ishikawa 3 | | Pts: Akhmet 31; Rebs: Tyutyunik, Akhmet 13; Asts: Ismail 6 |

Azadi Basketball Hall, Tehran
Referees: Ivan Zachara (CZE), Nazir Al-Saudi (LIB), Rajnarayan Patro (IND)

=== 3rd place ===
September 5
13:00

| Syria | 93–86 | Japan |
Scoring by quarter: 22–17, 19–11, 20–28, 32–30
| Pts: Gneed 24; Rebs: Sder 10; Asts: Al-Jabe 5 | | Pts: Hiejima 25; Rebs: Nagayoshi 9 Asts: Ishikawa 7 |

Azadi Basketball Hall, Tehran
Referees: Ivan Zachara (CZE), Amir Hossein Safarzadeh (IRI), J. Abdullah

=== Final ===
September 5
17:00

| Iran | 95–76 | Kazakhstan |
Scoring by quarter: 25–19, 34–18, 22–21, 14–18
| Pts: Shirjang 24; Rebs: Hassanzadeh 12; Asts: Falahat 5 | | Pts: Tyutyunik, Arsenyev, Skornyakov 18; Rebs: Akhmet 12; Asts: Ledovskikh 4 |

Azadi Basketball Hall, Tehran
Referees: Aleksandr Gorshkov (RUS), Nobuyasu Aibara (JPN), Mohammad Al-Amiri (KUW)

== Final standing ==
| Qualified for the 2009 FIBA Under-19 World Championship |

| Rank | Team | Record |
|---|---|---|
| 1st place, gold medalist(s) | Iran | 6–1 |
| 2nd place, silver medalist(s) | Kazakhstan | 5–3 |
| 3rd place, bronze medalist(s) | Syria | 3–4 |
| 4 | Japan | 4–4 |
| 5 | China | 7–1 |
| 6 | South Korea | 5–3 |
| 7 | Philippines | 4–4 |
| 8 | Lebanon | 4–4 |
| 9 | Chinese Taipei | 4–2 |
| 10 | Jordan | 4–3 |
| 11 | Saudi Arabia | 2–4 |
| 12 | Hong Kong | 2–5 |
| 13 | India | 2–4 |
| 14 | United Arab Emirates | 1–6 |
| 15 | Malaysia | 0–5 |

== Awards ==
2008 Asian Under-18 champions

Iran
Second title
