= Mychal =

Mychal is a masculine given name. Notable people with the name include:

- Mychal Ammons (born 1992), American basketball player
- Mychal Givens (born 1990), American baseball pitcher
- Mychal Green (born 1983), American basketball player
- Mychal Judge (1933–2001), American priest
- Mychal Kearse (born 1983), American basketball player
- Mychal Kendricks (born 1990), American football linebacker
- Mychal Mulder (born 1994), Canadian basketball player
- Mychal Rivera (born 1990), American football tight end
- Mychal Sisson (born 1988), American football player
- Mychal Denzel Smith (born 1986), American writer
- Mychal Springer, American rabbi
- Mychal Thompson (born 1955), Bahamian basketball player
- Mychal Threets (born 1990), American librarian

== Middle name ==
- Brandon Mychal Smith (born 1989), American actor
- Alana Mychal Haim (born 1991), American musician and actress

== See also ==
- Mychael
- Michael
