= Northeast Conference Men's Basketball Defensive Player of the Year =

NEC Men's Basketball Defensive Player of the Year
- Awarded for: the best defensive basketball player in the Northeast Conference
- Country: United States
- First award: 2000
- Currently held by: Greg Gordon, LIU

The Northeast Conference (NEC) Men's Basketball Defensive Player of the Year is an award given to the basketball player in the Northeast Conference voted as the best defensive player. The award was first given after the 1999–2000 season. Wagner has won the award the most, at six times and Kenneth Ortiz of Wagner has won the award the most of any individual, at three times. In addition, three players have won the award twice: Mychal Kearse of Mount St. Mary's, Tristan Blackwood of Central Connecticut, and Amdy Fall of St. Francis Brooklyn.

== Key ==
†	Co-Defensive Players of the Year
Player (X)	Denotes the number of times the player has been awarded the Northeast Conference Defensive Player of the Year award at that point

== Winners ==
Year	Player	School
2000	Rick Mickens	Central Connecticut
2001	Greg Nunn	St. Francis Brooklyn
2002	Courtney Pritchard	Wagner
2003	Kevin Owens	Monmouth
2004	Nigel Wyatte	Wagner
2005	DeEarnest McLemore	Wagner
2006	Mychal Kearse	Mount St. Mary's
2007^{†}	Tristan Blackwood	Central Connecticut
2007^{†}	Mychal Kearse (2)	Mount St. Mary's
2008	Tristan Blackwood (2)	Central Connecticut
2009	Bateko Francisco	Robert Morris
2010	Mezie Nwigwe	Robert Morris
2011	Akeem Bennett	St. Francis Brooklyn
2012	Kenneth Ortiz	Wagner
2013	Kenneth Ortiz (2)	Wagner
2014	Kenneth Ortiz (3)	Wagner
2015	Amdy Fall	St. Francis Brooklyn
2016	Amdy Fall (2)	St. Francis Brooklyn
2017	Josh Nebo	Saint Francis
2018	Chris Wray	Mount St. Mary's
2019	Jare’l Spellman	Sacred Heart
2020	Juvaris Hayes	Merrimack
2021	Nana Opoku	Mount St. Mary's
2022	Alex Morales	Wagner
2023	Jordan Minor	Merrimack
2024	Jordan Derkack	Merrimack
2025	Abdul Momoh	Central Connecticut
2026	Greg Gordon	LIU

== Winners by school ==
School (NEC participation)	Winners	Years
Wagner (1981–present)	7	2002, 2004, 2005, 2012, 2013, 2014, 2022
Mount St. Mary's (1989–2022)	4	2006, 2007^{†}, 2018, 2021
St. Francis Brooklyn (1981–2023)	4	2001, 2011, 2015, 2016
Central Connecticut (1997–present)	4	2000, 2007^{†}, 2008, 2025
Merrimack (2019–2024)	3	2020, 2023, 2024
Robert Morris (1981–2020)	2	2009, 2010
Long Island (1981–present)	1	2026
Monmouth (1985–2013)	1	2003
Sacred Heart (1999–2024)	1	2019
Saint Francis (1981–present)	1	2017
Fairleigh Dickinson (1981–present)	0	
Le Moyne (2023–present)	0	
Stonehill (2022–present)	0	

^{†} Award was shared.
