= Zhou Zhicheng =

Chinese engineer

- 周志成
- Born: 22 June 1963 (age 63); Pinggu County, Beijing, China
- Education: Chengdu University of Science and Technology; Tsinghua University
- Scientific career
- Fields: Satellite engineering technology
- Workplaces: China Aerospace Science and Technology Corporation; Sichuan University

Zhou Zhicheng (Chinese: 周志成; pinyin: Zhōu Zhìchéng; born 22 June 1963) is a Chinese aerospace engineer who is a professor and dean of the School of Aerospace Science and Engineering, Sichuan University, and currently director of Communication Satellite Division of China Aerospace Science and Technology Corporation.

== Biography ==
Zhou was born in Pinggu County, Beijing, on 22 June 1963. In 1980, he entered Chengdu University of Science and Technology (now Sichuan University), graduating in 1984 with a Bachelor of Engineering degree. He received a Master of Engineering degree from Tsinghua University in 1987 and a Doctor of Engineering from China Aerospace Science and Technology Corporation in 2008.

In 1987, he joined the 501st Department, China Aerospace Science and Technology Corporation as an engineer. He was chief commander and chief designer of Dongfanghong-4 satellite, deputy chief designer of Beidou-1 satellite, and chief designer of Xinnuo-2 satellite. On 25 March 2019, he was engaged by Sichuan University as dean of the School of Aerospace Science and Engineering.

== Honours and awards ==
- 1993 State Science and Technology Progress Award (Third Class)
- 2003 State Science and Technology Progress Award (First Class)
- 2011 State Science and Technology Progress Award (Second Class)
- 2016 State Technological Invention Award (Second Class)
- 27 November 2017 Member of the Chinese Academy of Engineering (CAE)
- November 2018 Science and Technology Progress Award of the Ho Leung Ho Lee Foundation
- 2018 Member of the International Academy of Astronautics (IAA)
