= Reggie Clark =

American football player (born 1967)

No. 53, 79, 59
- Position: Linebacker

Personal information
- Born: October 17, 1967 (age 59); Charlotte, North Carolina, U.S.
- Listed height: 6 ft 2 in (1.88 m)
- Listed weight: 238 lb (108 kg)

Career information
- High school: Providence Day (Charlotte)
- College: North Carolina
- NFL draft: 1991: undrafted

Career history
- New England Patriots (1991–1992)*; → Montreal Machine (1992); San Diego Chargers (1992)*; Toronto Argonauts (1993); Pittsburgh Steelers (1994); Jacksonville Jaguars (1995–1996); Green Bay Packers (1997)*; Kansas City Chiefs (1998)*
- * Offseason or practice squad member only

Career NFL statistics
- Fumble recoveries: 2
- Tackles: 2
- Stats at Pro Football Reference

Reggie Boyce Clark (born October 17, 1967) is an American former professional football player who was a linebacker for three seasons in the National Football League (NFL) for two teams, the Pittsburgh Steelers and Jacksonville Jaguars. He went undrafted in the 1991 NFL draft. Clark played college football for the North Carolina Tar Heels.

He went to high school at Providence Day School in Charlotte, North Carolina.
