= Seiya Ando =

Japanese basketball player (born 1992)

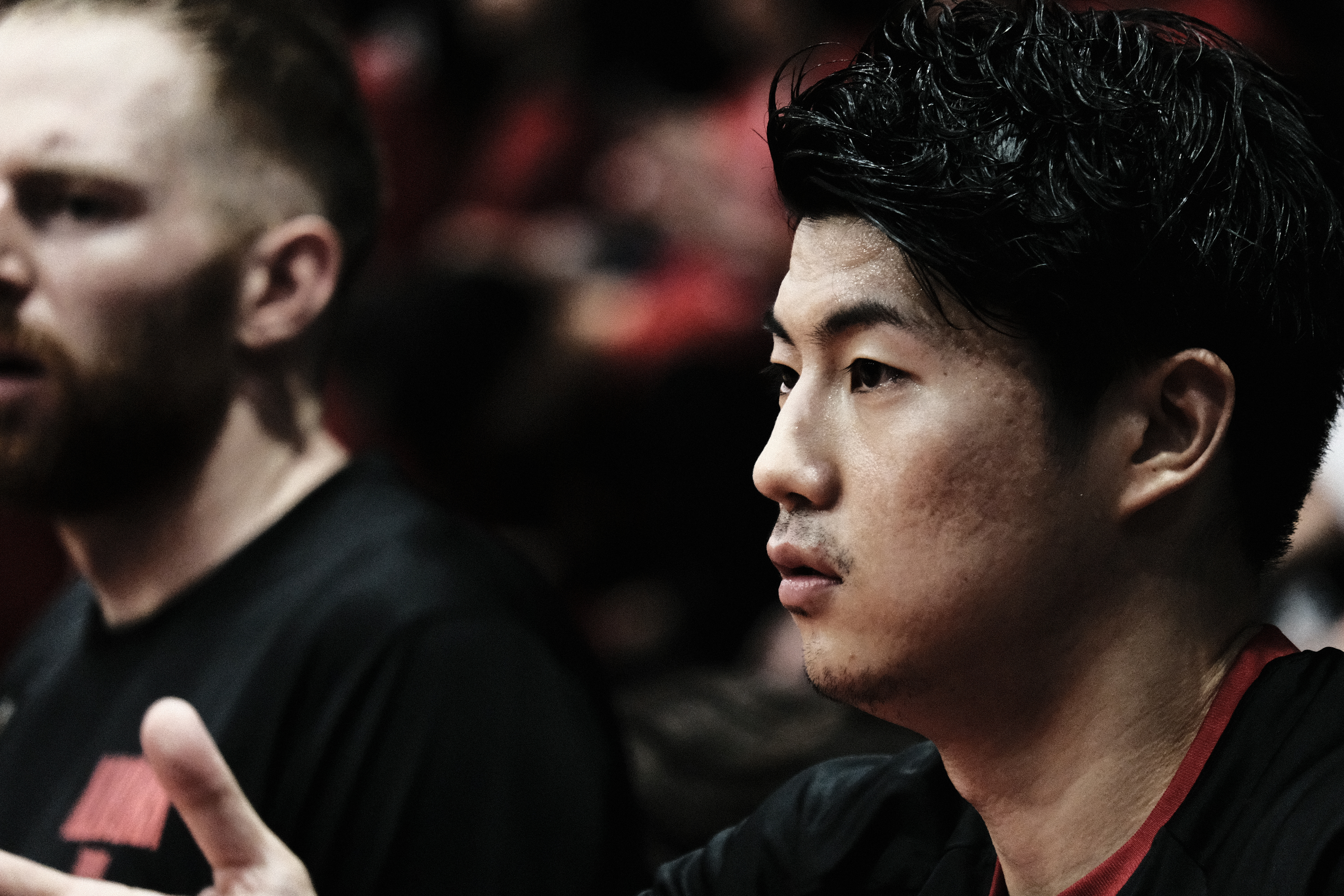
- Ando in 2018

No. 9 – Altiri Chiba
- Position: Point guard
- League: B.League

Personal information
- Born: July 15, 1992 (age 34) Edogawa, Tokyo, Japan
- Listed height: 5 ft 11 in (1.80 m)
- Listed weight: 176 lb (80 kg)

Career information
- High school: Meisei (Sendai, Miyagi)
- College: Meiji University (2010–2014)
- Playing career: 2014–present

Career history
- 2014–2015: Halifax Rainmen
- 2015: Meralco Bolts
- 2015-2016: Link Tochigi Brex
- 2016-2017: Akita Northern Happinets
- 2017-2021: Alvark Tokyo
- 2021-2025: Shimane Susanoo Magic
- 2025-2026: Yokohama B-Corsairs
- 2026-: Altiri Chiba

Career highlights
- FIBA Asia Champions Cup champion (2019); 2× B.League champion (2018, 2019); B.League All-Star (2017); Canadian NBL All-Rookie Team (2015); FIBA Asia Under-18 Scoring Leader, Best Five (2009)
Medals
Men's basketball
Representing Japan
FIBA Asia Champions Cup
Silver medal – second place	2018 Thailand	Team
Gold medal – first place	2019 Thailand	Team
William Jones Cup
Bronze medal – third place	2019 ROC	Team

Seiya Ando (安藤 誓哉, Andō Seiya; born July 15, 1992) is a Japanese professional basketball player who plays for Altiri Chiba of the B.League in Japan. He plays as Playmaker and is a native of Tokyo.

Ando is the first Japanese player ever to play in the National Basketball League of Canada. He started 34 games and finished the season averaging 10.4 points, 3.02 rebounds, 3.82 assists and 1.2 steals per game. After playing for the Meralco Bolts of the Philippine Basketball Association, he signed with the Link Tochigi Brex, but he did not start at all and was mostly benched by Thomas Wisman. He has inked with the "Pink" Akita Happinets.

== Career statistics ==
Legend
GP	Games played	GS	Games started	MPG	Minutes per game
FG%	Field goal percentage	3P%	3-point field goal percentage	FT%	Free throw percentage
RPG	Rebounds per game	APG	Assists per game	SPG	Steals per game
BPG	Blocks per game	PPG	Points per game	**Bold**	Career high

†	Denotes seasons in which Ando won an championship
*	Led the league

Year	Team	GP	GS	MPG	FG%	3P%	FT%	RPG	APG	SPG	BPG	PPG
2014-15	Halifax Rainmen	45	34	28.1	40.3	31.0	71.9	3.02	**3.82**	**1.20**	0	10.04
2015	Meralco Bolts	11	8	27.9	39.8	23.8	66.7	2.73	1.91	1.09	0	8.00
2015-16	Tochigi	25	0	6.4	**45.2**	38.5	**87.5**	0.9	0.8	0.1	0	2.3
2016-17	Akita	**60**	**60**	**33.8**	38.7	34.1	70.7	**4.5**	3.0	1.0	0	**10.4**
2017-18†	A Tokyo	55	55	24.5	43.7	**39.4**	78.5	2.7	2.6	0.9	0.0	8.8
2018-19†	A Tokyo	60	60	23.36	43.2	38.4	88.2	2.1	3.2	0.61	0.03	9.7
2019-20	A Tokyo	41	38	26.9	42.1	28.7	76.2	2.3	4.4	1.0	0.0	11.5

=== Playoff games ===
Year	Team	GP	GS	MPG	FG%	3P%	FT%	RPG	APG	SPG	BPG	PPG
2014-15	Halifax	9		26.4	30.6	27.0	71.4	2.8	3.9	1.0	0	7.1
2016-17	Akita	2		34.0	46.2	58.3	75.0	3.5	1.5	1.0	0	13.5
2017-18	A Tokyo	5		23.0	37.5	37.5	100	2.4	2.8	0.8	0	7.2
2018-19	A Tokyo	6	6	24.44	50.0	42.1	75.0	2.0	3.0	0.33	0	12.0

=== Early cup games ===
Year	Team	GP	GS	MPG	FG%	3P%	FT%	RPG	APG	SPG	BPG	PPG
2017	A Tokyo	3	3	22.59	.500	.500	.000	2.0	2.0	1.33	0	5.0
2018	A Tokyo	2	2	27.55	.316	.000	.900	4.0	4.5	0.5	0	10.5
2019	A Tokyo	2	0	23.08	.462	.429	1.000	3.5	6.0	2.0	0	10.0

=== FIBA Asia Champions Cup ===
Year	Team	GP	GS	MPG	FG%	3P%	FT%	RPG	APG	SPG	BPG	PPG
2018	A Tokyo	5		24.7	.391	.308	1.000	1.6	3.4	1.4	0.0	8.6
2019	A Tokyo	5		20.2	.353	.294	1.000	1.4	2.6	1.2	0.0	7.2

=== National team ===
Year	Team	GP	GS	MPG	FG%	3P%	FT%	RPG	APG	SPG	BPG	PPG
2019	Japan	8		20.9	.409	.360	.815	3.8	2.9	0.6	0.0	10.6
2019	Japan	3		21.0	.250	.250	.667	1.3	1.3	0.7	0.0	3.0

== Gallery ==
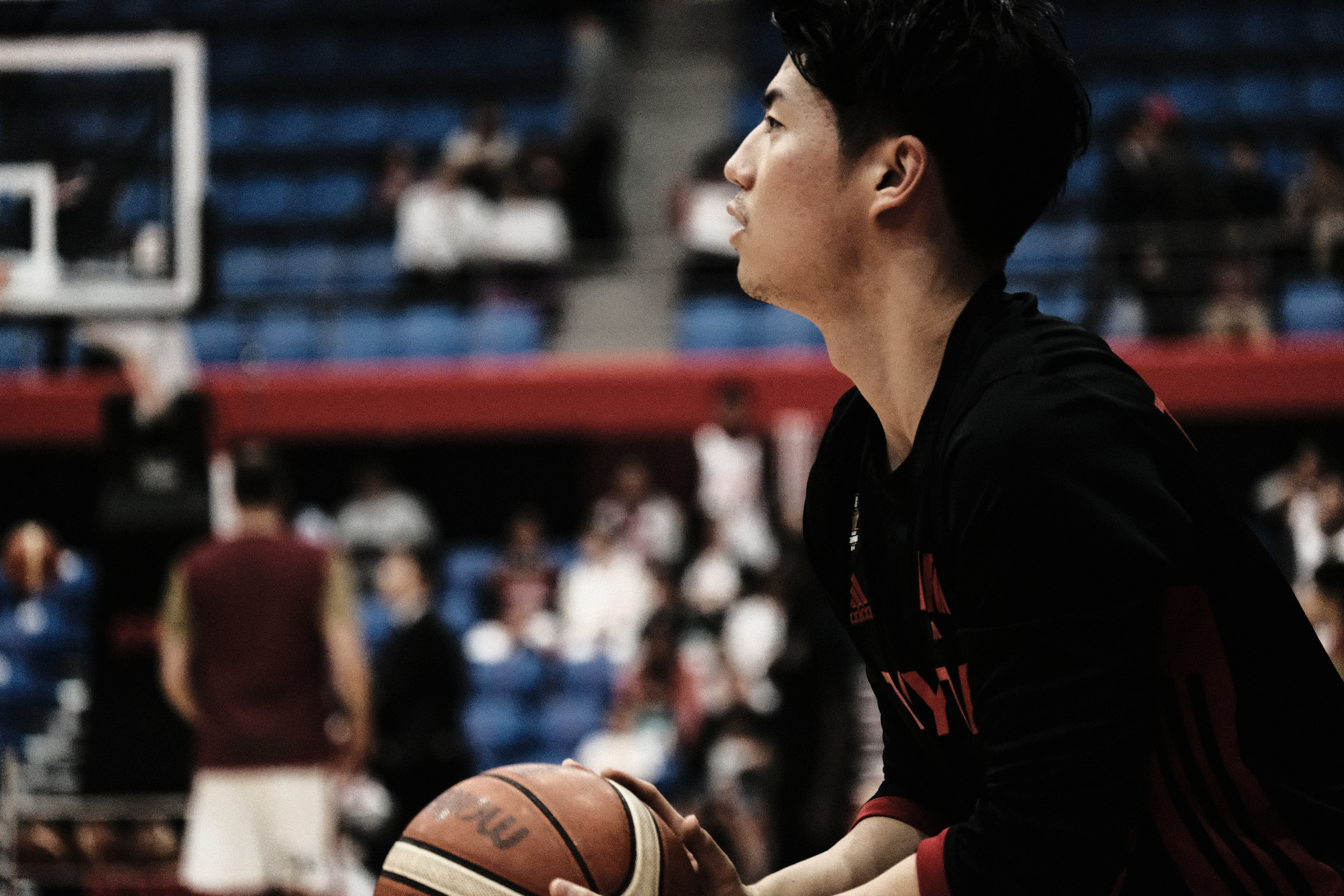

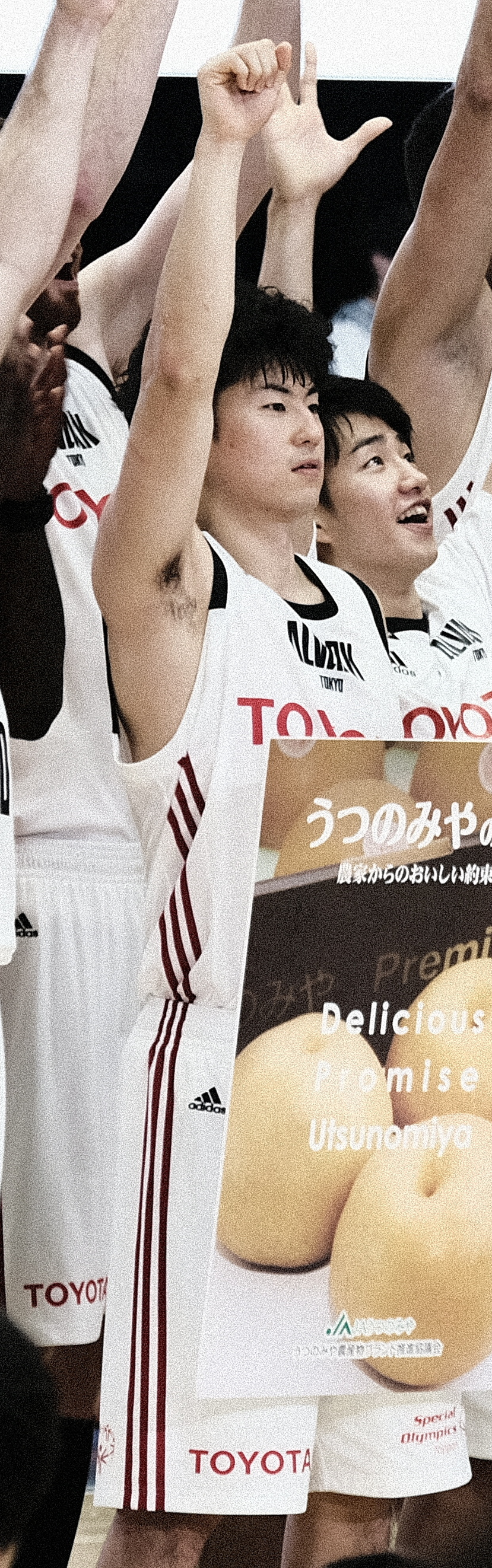
