= Wang Qi (scientist) =

Chinese materials scientist

- 王琪
- Born: 22 July 1949 (age 77); Zigong, Sichuan, China
- Education: Sichuan University
- Scientific career
- Fields: Plastic processing equipment
- Workplaces: Sichuan University

Wang Qi (Chinese: 王琪; pinyin: Wáng Qí; born 22 July 1949) is a Chinese materials scientist and an academician of the Chinese Academy of Engineering. She is a professor at Sichuan University and director of the State Key Laboratory of Polymer Materials Engineering.

== Biography ==
Wang was born in Zigong, Sichuan, on 22 July 1949, during the Republic of China. She earned a bachelor's degree in 1982, a master's degree in 1984, and a doctoral degree in 1989, all from the Chengdu University of Science and Technology (nowadays Sichuan University).

She joined the Chinese Communist Party in June 1984. She taught at Sichuan University since 1986, what she was promoted to associate professor in 1992 and to full professor in 1993. She was a postdoctoral fellow at Laval University between December 1989 and March 1993. In March 1992, she became deputy director of the State Key Laboratory of Polymer Materials Engineering, rising to director in October 1998.

== Honours and awards ==
- 2006 State Technological Invention Award (Second Class)
- 27 November 2017 Member of the Chinese Academy of Engineering (CAE)
- 2018 State Technological Invention Award (Second Class)
- 3 November 2020 Science and Technology Innovation Award of the Ho Leung Ho Lee Foundation
