= Providence Day School =

Prep school in Charlotte, North Carolina, US

Location
- 5800 Sardis Road; Charlotte, North Carolina 28270; United States; 35°09′38″N 80°46′52″W

Information
- Type: Private; Independent; day; college-preparatory school
- Religious affiliation: Nonsectarian
- Established: September 28, 1970 (56 years ago)
- CEEB code: 340687
- Headmaster: Glyn Cowlishaw
- Faculty: 143 (on FTE basis)
- Gender: Co-educational
- Enrollment: 1558 (as of 2015–16)
- Average class size: 12–20
- Student to teacher ratio: 11.1
- Campus: Suburban
- Colors: Red, white, and navy blue
- Athletics: North Carolina Independent Schools Athletic Association (NCISAA)
- Team name: Chargers
- Rival: Charlotte Country Day School, Charlotte Latin School
- Accreditation: National Association of Independent Schools; Southern Association of Colleges and Schools; Blue Ribbon; 1987 and 2003
- Newspaper: The Charger
- Tuition: $23,040–$32,810 (2024-25)
- Website: www.providenceday.org

Providence Day School is a private, co-educational, college preparatory school located in Charlotte, North Carolina. The school is accredited by the Southern Association of Colleges and Schools. Providence Day is known as having one of the best high school football programs in the country according to ESPN.

== History ==
Providence Day School was founded in September 1970. The school was the largest of a number of independent schools in the Charlotte area that were quickly formed in response to busing orders that had been handed down by James Bryan McMillan, a District Judge for the United States District Court for the Western District of North Carolina.

Several leaders of an area anti-busing group called the Concerned Parents Association helped start Providence Day as an alternative to the newly integrated Charlotte-Mecklenburg public school system. The founders organized as the Southeast Community Corporation and began advertising for applications for fifth and sixth grade students in September 1970 on a "first-come, first-served basis".

In early September 1970, an approximately seven-acre (2.8 ha) site that included a former residence was secured at the intersection of Sardis and Rama Roads. The school was initially housed in four rooms inside the residence and four mobile classrooms. Classes began on September 28, 1970 with five certified teachers and 180 students in fifth and sixth grades. The school operated without a headmaster until William T. Townsend Jr. was hired in May 1971.

In February 1971 the North Carolina Department of Public Instruction approved Providence Day School as a private school. A new facility that included 13 new classrooms, administrative offices and a teachers' lounge was constructed prior to the 1971–72 school year. Also in 1972, Douglas C. Eveleth was named new headmaster, joining Providence Day from Cape Fear Academy in Wilmington, North Carolina. The student body grew rapidly in the early 1970s and by October 1974 had an enrollment of 670 students in first through twelfth grades. In December 1975, the school received accreditation from the Southern Association of Colleges and Schools.

The size of the campus more than doubled in 1981 due to the $500,000 purchase of 14 acres (5.7 ha) of adjacent land. Each enrolled family was assessed $1,000 to finance the purchase. The athletic center built on the land was named in honor of Thomas Ridenhour, who served as president of the board of trustees for 13 years. The school expanded again in 1990, adding the McMahon Fine Arts Center, a 37,000 ft^{2} (3,400 m^{2}) facility including a 500-seat theater, dining hall, and classrooms for both music and art. Also in 1990, Providence Day added an additional 6.8 acres (2.8 ha) of land to the campus for $1.2 million. The Dickson-Hemby Technology Center, housing computer labs, conference rooms, faculty offices and STEM classrooms was opened in 1998. In 2015, Providence Day launched a comprehensive fund-raising campaign that financed a new 80,000 ft^{2} (7,400 m^{2}) academic center, campus gateway building and additional parking, while also increasing the size of the school's endowment and annual fund.

Eugene Bratek became the school's third headmaster in 1986. Upon his retirement from the school in 2007, a new teleconferencing center in the school's fine arts building was named in his honor. Bratek was succeeded by Jack Creeden who served in the role for three years. Glyn Cowlishaw was selected as the new head of school in December 2010. His tenure began July 1, 2011 and continues to the present day.

== Academics ==
Providence Day School is divided into Lower, Middle and Upper School divisions — the Lower School is led by a Head of Division and an Assistant Head, while the Middle and Upper schools are both led by a Head of Division and a Dean of Students.

Providence Day is known for being the first school in the country to have a Global Studies diploma program, described by their website as “cultivating an appreciation for differences and equipping students with the understanding, skills, and character to become active global citizens.

== Athletics ==
Sports at Providence Day School are available to all students in 7th to 12th grades. The Athletics program supports 68 teams across the middle school, junior varsity and varsity levels, 26 of which are varsity sports.

Providence Day School competes in the North Carolina Independent Schools Athletic Association (NCISAA). Locally, Upper School teams compete in the Charlotte Independent School Athletic Association (CISAA) while the Middle School competes in the Greater Charlotte Middle School Athletic Association (GCMSAA).

== Controversies ==
In November 2020, an African-American student, Jamel Van Rensalier, was expelled from the school following an ongoing dispute between the student's mother, Faith Fox, and school administration. The dispute revolved around the reading of August Wilson's play Fences in English class. Fox objected to the assignment because the play includes many racial slurs and she "imagined her son’s mostly white class at the Providence Day School reading the dialogue out loud... her main concern was that the themes were too mature for the group and would foster stereotypes about Black families." Fox continued her protests after being provided an alternative assignment and, out of five students who expressed discomfort with the material, Van Rensalier was the only student expelled.

== Notable alumni ==
- Reggie Clark (1987), NFL linebacker
- Brett Doar (1991), multi-disciplinary artist, engineer, and contraptionist known for building Rube Goldberg machines
- Reggie Love (2000), personal aide to President Barack Obama, former college basketball player, and media editor
- Andrew Coats (2001), director, writer, and animator at Pixar
- Mychal Kearse (2003), professional basketball player
- Tiffany Mitchell (2012), WNBA player
- Tomas Hilliard-Arce (2014), professional soccer player
- Anna Cockrell (2016), Olympic Athlete for USATF
- Grant Williams (2016), NBA player
- Devon Dotson (2018), NBA player for the Chicago Bulls
- Ikem Ekwonu (2019), NFL offensive tackle
- Chris Peal (2023), Syracuse Orange cornerback
- Jadyn Davis (2024), East Tennessee State Buccaneers quarterback
- Jordan Shipp (2024), North Carolina Tar Heels wide receiver
- Matthew Heyd, Episcopal priest
