= Zhao Hongwei =

Chinese physicist

- 赵红卫
- Born: January 1966 (age 60); Ning County, Gansu, China
- Education: Chengdu University of Science and Technology
- Scientific career
- Fields: Accelerator physics
- Workplaces: China Institute of Atomic Energy

Chinese name
- Traditional Chinese: 趙紅衛
- Simplified Chinese: 赵红卫
Transcriptions
Standard Mandarin
- Hanyu Pinyin: Zhào Hóngwèi

Zhao Hongwei (Chinese: 赵红卫; born January 1966) is a Chinese physicist currently serving as Party secretary and deputy dean of the China Institute of Atomic Energy.

== Biography ==
Zhao was born in Ning County, Gansu in January 1966, at the dawn of the Cultural Revolution. His given name Hongwei (红卫) means the Red Guards (红卫兵). He received his Bachelor of Science degree from Chengdu University of Science and Technology (now Sichuan University) and Master of Science degree from the Institute of Modern Physics, Chinese Academy of Sciences (CAS) in 1988 and 1991, respectively. In August 1995 he graduated from Dubna Nuclear Research Institute in Russia, earning a doctor's degree in science.

In November 1997 he joined the China Institute of Atomic Energy, where he successively served as researcher, deputy director, director, and doctoral supervisor. He was deputy chief engineer of the Cooling Storage Ring Project of Heavy Ion Research Facility in Lanzhou (HIRFL–CSR) between September 1999 and January 2006. He is now the Party secretary and deputy dean of the China Institute of Atomic Energy.

== Honour ==
On November 22, 2019, he was elected an academician of the Chinese Academy of Sciences (CAS).
