= Karl Sarkis =

Lebanese basketball player (born 1986)

Champville SC
- Position: Point guard
- League: Lebanese Basketball League

Personal information
- Born: July 26, 1986 (age 40) Beirut, Lebanon
- Listed height: 6 ft .5 in (1.84 m)
- Listed weight: 169.4 lb (77 kg)

Career information
- Playing career: 2009–present

Karl Sarkis (born 26 July 1986) is a Lebanese basketball player with Champville SC of the Lebanese Basketball League. He played in the 2009–10 season with Lebanese division 2 side Blue Stars before being promoted to division one with Hekmeh BC. in the 2012–13 season Karl then moved to Champville SC to play for 1 seasons, until the 2012–14 season in which he moved to Amchit Club.
