= Li Muhao =

Chinese basketball player

Li Muhao 李慕豪
No. 21 – Shenzhen Leopards
- Position: Center
- League: Chinese Basketball Association

Personal information
- Born: June 2, 1992 (age 34) Guiyang, Guizhou, China
- Listed height: 7 ft 2 in (2.18 m)
- Listed weight: 242 lb (110 kg)

Career information
- Playing career: 2010–present

Career history
- 2010–2020: Dongguan / Shenzhen Leopards
- 2020–2023: Beijing Ducks
- 2023–present: Shenzhen Leopards
Medals
Men's basketball
Representing China
FIBA Asia Championship
Gold medal – first place	2015 Changsha
East Asian Games
Silver medal – second place	2013 Tianjin
FIBA Asia Under-18 Championship
Gold medal – first place	2010 Yemen

Li Muhao (Chinese: 李慕豪; pinyin: Li Mùháo born June 2, 1992) is a Chinese basketball player who plays for Shenzhen Leopards in the Chinese Basketball Association.

== Career statistics ==
=== CBA ===
Year	Team	GP	RPG	APG	FG%	FT%	PPG
2010–11	Dongguan	6	0.8	0.0	.385	.875	1.7
2011–12	Dongguan	16	1.9	0.3	.350	.629	2.3
2012–13	Dongguan	33	4.1	0.3	.541	.648	7.4
2013–14	Dongguan	35	5.1	0.7	.659	.646	9.0
2014–15	Dongguan	39	3.2	0.4	.588	.618	5.0
Career		129	3.0	0.3	.505	.683	5.1
