= Samer Ozeir =

Lebanese-American basketball player

No. 24 – Champville SC
- Position: Power forward
- League: NCAA

Personal information
- Born: December 2, 1992 (age 33) Michigan, United States
- Listed height: 2.00 m (6 ft 7 in)
- Listed weight: 104 kg (229 lb)

Career information
- Playing career: 2012–present

Samer Ozeir (born December 2, 1992, in Michigan United States) is a former Lebanese-American professional basketball player who played for Champville SC in the Lebanese basketball league. He also played for the junior Lebanon national basketball team in 2010 and 2011. Samer retired from basketball in 2018.
