= Kaito Ishikawa (basketball) =

Japanese basketball player

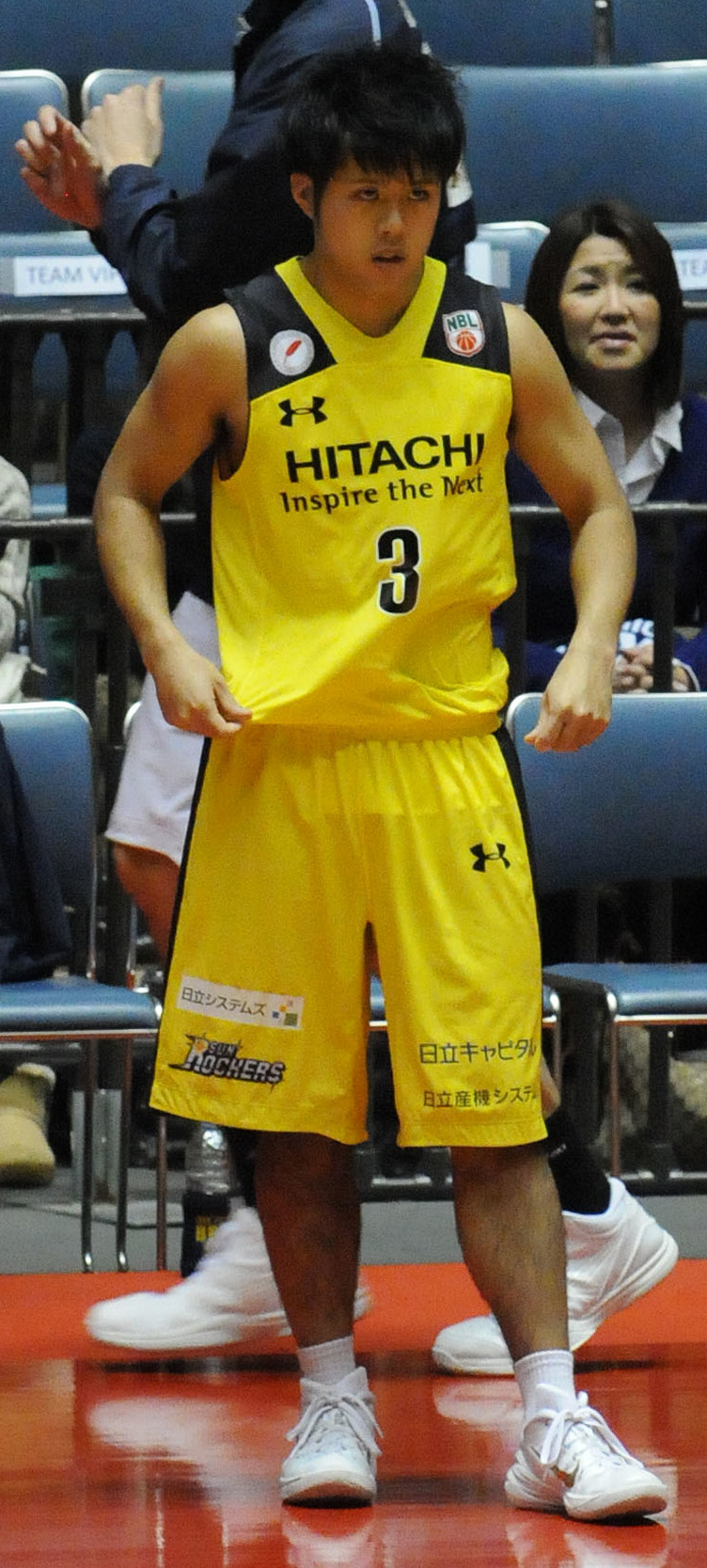

No. 11 – Shinshu Brave Warriors
- Position: Guard
- League: B.League

Personal information
- Born: November 30, 1990 (age 35) Kōtō, Tokyo, Japan
- Listed height: 5 ft 7 in (1.70 m)
- Listed weight: 159 lb (72 kg)

Career information
- High school: Meisei (Sendai, Miyagi)
- College: Nihon University
- Playing career: 2013–present

Career history
- 2013–2015: Hitachi Sunrockers
- 2015-2016: Iwate Big Bulls
- 2016-2018: Sendai 89ers
- 2018-2019: Shinshu Brave Warriors
- 2019-2021: Kumamoto Volters
- 2021-2023: Nagoya Diamond Dolphins
- 2023-present: Shinshu Brave Warriors

Career highlights
- B2 Finals MVP

Kaito Ishikawa (石川海斗, Ishikawa Kaito; born November 30, 1990) is a Japanese professional basketball player who plays for the Shinshu Brave Warriors of the B.League in Japan.

== Career statistics ==
Legend
GP	Games played	GS	Games started	MPG	Minutes per game
FG%	Field goal percentage	3P%	3-point field goal percentage	FT%	Free throw percentage
RPG	Rebounds per game	APG	Assists per game	SPG	Steals per game
BPG	Blocks per game	PPG	Points per game	**Bold**	Career high

Year	Team	GP	GS	MPG	FG%	3P%	FT%	RPG	APG	SPG	BPG	PPG
2013-14	Hitachi	3		10.0	.182	.125	.000	0.0	2.0	0.3	0.0	1.7
2014-15	Hitachi	27		8.0	.273	.188	.733	0.6	1.0	0.3	0.0	1.7
2015-16	Iwate	52	38	25.9	.340	.276	.655	2.6	3.1	1.5	0.1	5.7
2016-17	Sendai	48	35	23.3	.395	.262	.734	2.1	2.4	0.7	0.2	7.0
2017-18	Sendai	60	59	28.6	.370	.322	.775	2.4	5.4	1.2	0.1	11.0
2018-19	Shinshu	59	59	30.4	.399	.305	.789	2.2	6.6	1.0	0.0	12.1
