= Mychael =

Mychael is a masculine given name. Notable people with the name include:

- Mychael Danna (born 1958), Canadian composer
- Mychael Knight (1978–2017), American fashion designer
- Mychael Urban, American sportswriter, radio and TV personality

== See also ==
- Timothy Mychael Patrick, American football player
