= Ahmad Ibrahim (basketball) =

Lebanese basketball player (born 1992)

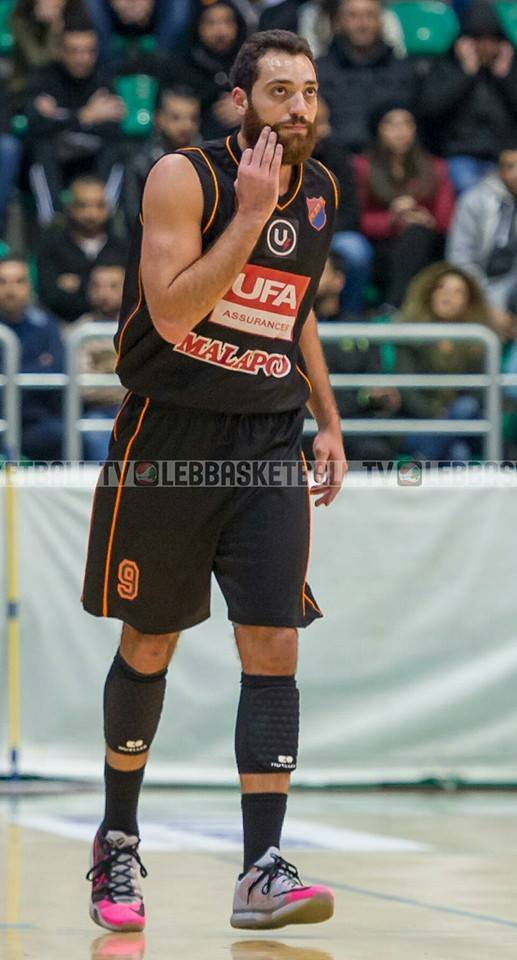

No. 9 – Homenetmen Beirut
- Position: Small forward
- League: Lebanese Basketball League; West Asia Super League

Personal information
- Born: February 18, 1992 (age 34) Beirut, Lebanon
- Listed height: 6 ft 7 in (2.01 m)
- Listed weight: 220 lb (100 kg)

Career information
- High school: The Patterson School (Lenoir, North Carolina); Mountain State Academy (Eureka, Montana); Christian Life Center Academy (Humble, Texas)
- College: Rice (2011–2012)
- NBA draft: 2013: undrafted
- Playing career: 2010–present

Career history
- 2012–2015: Sporting Al Riyadi Beirut
- 2015–2016: Homenetmen Beirut
- 2017–2019: Champville SC
- 2019–2020: Homenetmen Beirut
- 2021–2023: Dynamo Lebanon
- 2023–2024: Sagesse Club
- 2024–present: Homenetmen Beirut

Ahmad Ali Ibrahim (Arabic: إبراهيم أحمد, born February 18, 1992) is a Lebanese professional basketball player for Homenetmen Beirut of the Lebanese Basketball League. He was a member of the Lebanon national basketball team for the 2010 William Jones Cup. During the 2012 off-season, Ahmad left the Rice Owls to pursue a professional career in Lebanon.

== High school ==
During 2008–09, he attended The Patterson School in Lenoir, North Carolina. However, the school closed for funding reasons in 2009. For his junior year, he attended Mountain State Academy and for his senior year, he attended Christian Life Center Academy in Humble, Texas. As a senior, he averaged 18 points, nine rebounds and four assists while seeing playing time at all three perimeter positions. He helped lead his high school team to a 30–5 record.

== Youth national team (U-18) ==
During the FIBA Asia Under-18 Championship 2008, Ahmad was then 16. He averaged 32.6 points per game during that tournament. Ibrahim is considered as future hope of Lebanese basketball. Ahmad also played in the 2010 FIBA Asia Under-18 Championship.

== Rice University ==
Ahmad committed to the Rice Owls. In 33 games, he averaged 6.2ppg, 1.9rpg, and 1.0apg.

== Personal life ==
Ahmad is the cousin of fellow Lebanese basketball player Mohammed Ibrahim.
