= Yuya Nagayoshi =

Japanese basketball player

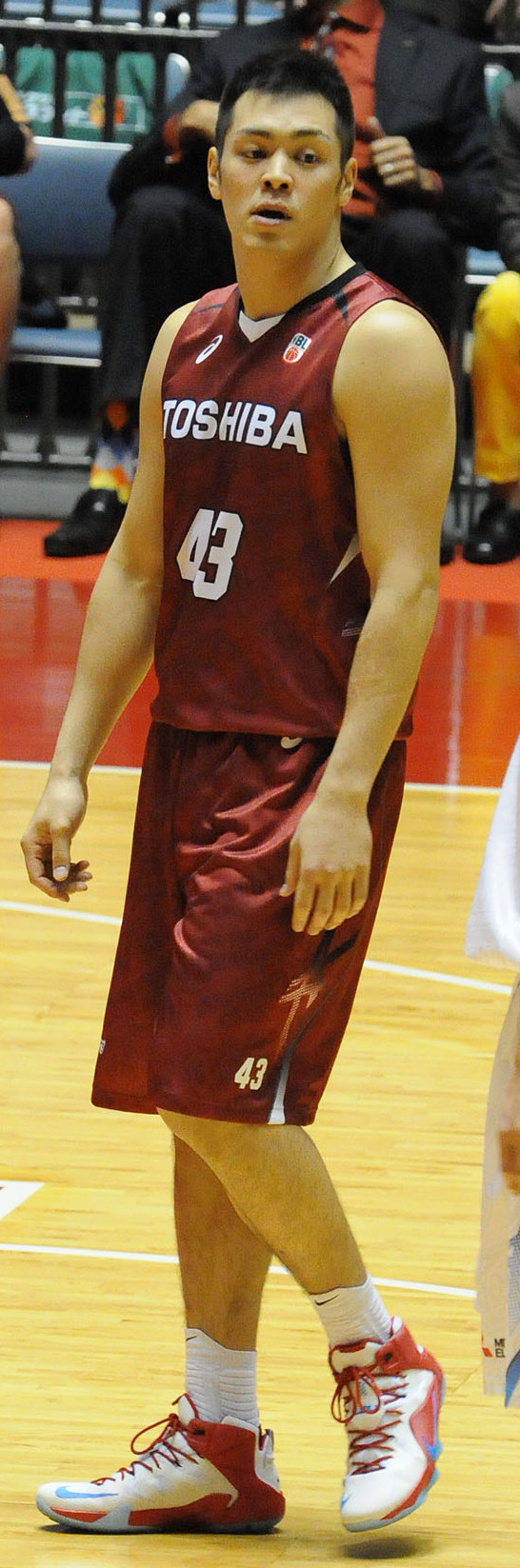

No. 43 – Rizing Zephyr Fukuoka
- Position: Power forward
- League: B.League

Personal information
- Born: July 14, 1991 (age 35) Kagoshima, Kagoshima
- Listed height: 6 ft 7 in (2.01 m)
- Listed weight: 235 lb (107 kg)

Career information
- High school: Nobeoka Gakuen (Nobeoka, Miyazaki)
- College: Aoyama Gakuin University (2010-2014)
- Playing career: 2014–present

Career history
- 2014–2017: Toshiba Brave Thunders Kanagawa
- 2017–2021: Kyoto Hannaryz
- 2021–present: Rizing Zephyr Fukuoka

Yuya Nagayoshi (永吉佑也, Nagayoshi Yuya; born July 14, 1991) is a Japanese professional basketball player for Rizing Zephyr Fukuoka of the B.League in Japan. The Japanese Olympic Committee penalized Nagayoshi and three players for buying sex in Jakarta and sent them back home on August 20, 2018. They have been suspended from official competition for one year.

== Career statistics ==
Legend
| GP | Games played | GS | Games started | MPG | Minutes per game |
| FG% | Field goal percentage | 3P% | 3-point field goal percentage | FT% | Free throw percentage |
| RPG | Rebounds per game | APG | Assists per game | SPG | Steals per game |
| BPG | Blocks per game | PPG | Points per game | **Bold** | Career high |

| Year | Team | GP | GS | MPG | FG% | 3P% | FT% | RPG | APG | SPG | BPG | PPG |
|---|---|---|---|---|---|---|---|---|---|---|---|---|
| 2014-15 | Toshiba | 51 | | 12.1 | .397 | .280 | .638 | 1.7 | 0.4 | 0.2 | 0.1 | 2.7 |
| 2015-16 | Toshiba | 54 | 29 | 15.7 | .438 | .200 | .511 | 2.4 | 0.9 | 0.5 | 0.1 | 3.3 |
| 2016-17 | Kawasaki | 60 | 1 | 15.1 | .532 | .400 | .795 | 2.1 | 0.7 | 0.2 | 0.1 | 4.5 |
| 2017-18 | Kyoto | 57 | 56 | 26.5 | .411 | .343 | .681 | 3.9 | 1.6 | 0.5 | 0.2 | 8.2 |
