= Chengdu University of Science and Technology =

National public university in Chengdu, Sichuan, China

- 成都科学技术大学
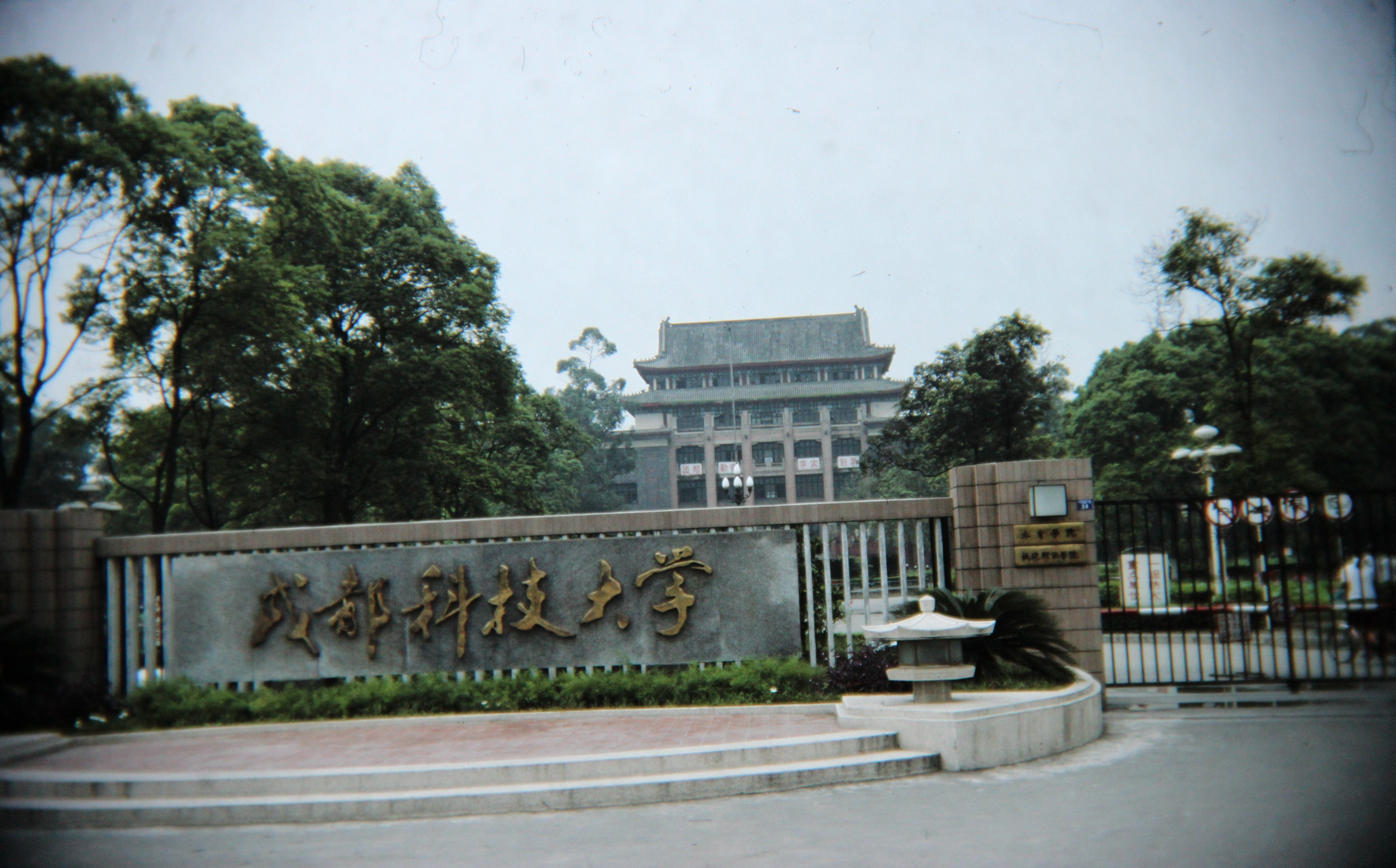
- Chengdu University of Science and Technology in 1991
- Former name: Chengdu Engineering College (1954–1978)
- Type: Public university
- Active: 1952–1994
- Location: Chengdu, Sichuan, China

Chengdu University of Science and Technology
- Simplified Chinese: 成都科技大学
- Traditional Chinese: 成都科技大學
Transcriptions
Standard Mandarin
- Hanyu Pinyin: Chéngdū Kējìdàxué

Chengdu Engineering College
- Simplified Chinese: 成都工学院
- Traditional Chinese: 成都工學院
Transcriptions
Standard Mandarin
- Hanyu Pinyin: Chéngdū Gōngxuéyuàn

The Chengdu University of Science and Technology (CUST; 成都科学技术大学) was a national public university from 1954 to 1994 in Chengdu, Sichuan, China, specializing in engineering and applied sciences. It was merged into Sichuan University in 1994.

The institution was established in 1954 as Chengdu Engineering College (成都工学院) from the College of Engineering of Sichuan University and subsequently absorbed the Sichuan Chemical Engineering College. In 1978, it was renamed the Chengdu University of Science and Technology and designated a national key university.

The university was administered principally by the Chinese Academy of Sciences from 1978 until the beginning of the 1980s and subsequently by the Ministry of Education. By the early 1990s, it had developed particular strengths in polymer materials, hydraulic engineering, chemical engineering, and light-industry technologies.

In 1994, the Chengdu University of Science and Technology merged with Sichuan University to form Sichuan Union University (四川联合大学). The combined institution resumed the name Sichuan University in 1998. CUST consequently became one of the three principal institutional predecessors of the present Sichuan University, alongside the pre-1994 Sichuan University and the West China University of Medical Sciences.

== History ==
=== Origins ===
==== Engineering education at Sichuan University ====
The principal institutional lineage of the Chengdu University of Science and Technology originated in the engineering programs of Sichuan University. During the Second Sino-Japanese War, the movement of industrial and research institutions into Sichuan increased demand for engineering education in the province. In 1944, Sichuan University received approval to add civil and hydraulic engineering and aeronautical engineering programs to its College of Science. A mechanical and electrical engineering program followed in 1945, when the university established a College of Science and Engineering.

In 1947, the College of Science and Engineering was divided into separate colleges of science and engineering. The College of Engineering moved from Sichuan University's main campus to a site across the Jin River. By 1948, it contained departments in civil and hydraulic engineering, aeronautical engineering, mechanical engineering, electrical engineering, and chemical engineering.

The organization changed substantially during the nationwide reorganization of Chinese higher education in the early 1950s. Sichuan University's aeronautical engineering department was transferred to the newly established Beijing Institute of Aeronautics, while its chemical engineering department became part of a separate chemical-engineering institution. At the same time, water-resources and related engineering programs from other institutions in southwestern China were transferred into Sichuan University's engineering college.

==== Sichuan Chemical Engineering College ====
A second major component of the later university was the Sichuan Chemical Engineering College (四川化工学院), established in Luzhou in 1952 as part of the same nationwide restructuring. It assembled chemical-engineering and related programs and personnel from institutions including Sichuan University, Chongqing University, West China University, North Sichuan University, the Southwest Agricultural College, and several industrial and technical colleges.

The institute was organized around fields required by China's developing industrial economy, including inorganic chemical engineering, leather technology, papermaking, food processing, and chemical machinery. Its initial faculty and student body consequently drew on the academic traditions of several universities rather than a single predecessor.

One of the specialties developed at the institute was polymer science. Polymer scientist Xu Xi (徐僖) joined its faculty and in 1953 helped establish a program in plastics, which became an important precursor of the later polymer-materials programs at Chengdu Engineering College and CUST.

=== Chengdu Engineering College ===
At a national conference on engineering higher education in July 1953, the Ministry of Higher Education decided that Sichuan University's College of Engineering and the Sichuan Chemical Engineering College should be consolidated. Before the consolidation was completed, the Sichuan University engineering college was separated from its parent university and formally established as Chengdu Engineering College on 27 August 1954.

At its establishment, the college had departments of mechanical, electrical, civil, and hydraulic engineering and enrolled 1,273 students. In November 1954, the State Council approved the relocation of the Sichuan Chemical Engineering College from Luzhou to Chengdu and its merger with Chengdu Engineering College. The Ministry of Higher Education directed that the combined institution retain the Chengdu Engineering College name.

The consolidation was implemented during 1955. The resulting college had five principal departments—mechanical engineering, electrical engineering, civil engineering, hydraulic engineering, and chemical engineering—and programs in fields including machinery, power systems, roads and bridges, hydraulic structures, inorganic chemical technology, plastics, leather and tanning, and chemical-process machinery. Some programs originally belonging to the Sichuan chemical institute were transferred elsewhere during the reorganization; papermaking, for example, was transferred to Tianjin University, while sugar-related engineering was transferred to what became the South China University of Technology.

Postgraduate training began during the 1950s. Chengdu Engineering College started admitting graduate students in 1957, although graduate education was later interrupted during the Cultural Revolution.

The institution also expanded into new fields of applied science and engineering. Its polymer program developed into a Department of Polymer Chemical Engineering in the early 1960s, while research institutes were established in areas including polymers and hydraulic engineering. A retrospective in the Journal of Polymer Science identifies the programs developed at Chengdu Engineering College and its successor as an important institutional base for the growth of polymer science and engineering education in China.

=== Chengdu University of Science and Technology ===
Following the restoration and expansion of higher education after the Cultural Revolution, the State Council approved the renaming of Chengdu Engineering College as the Chengdu University of Science and Technology in 1978. It was simultaneously designated a national key university.

The university was transferred into the system of the Chinese Academy of Sciences, with administration shared between the academy and Sichuan Province and the academy exercising the principal role. The move formed part of a broader expansion of the academy's higher-education activities in 1978. The academy also took over Zhejiang University and the Heilongjiang Institute of Technology during the same period. CUST's period under academy leadership was comparatively brief. In November 1980, the State Council approved a change to joint administration by the national Ministry of Education and Sichuan Province, with the ministry taking the principal role; the Chinese Academy of Sciences records that CUST was no longer under its leadership from 1981.

Graduate education resumed in 1978. During the 1980s and early 1990s, the university expanded its master's and doctoral programs and established postdoctoral research stations. In the first national authorization of doctoral programs in 1981, polymer materials and hydraulics were among the areas in which the university developed doctoral-level training.

In the national assessment of key disciplines approved in 1988, CUST was represented by nationally designated disciplines including polymer materials, hydraulics and river dynamics, and leather and tanning materials. These fields remained prominent academic strengths after the university's merger into Sichuan University.

The polymer program was particularly important to CUST's research profile. In 1989, the State Planning Commission approved the establishment of the State Key Laboratory of Polymer Materials Engineering on the basis of the university's polymer discipline. The laboratory was constructed as part of a World Bank-supported national program for key disciplinary laboratories.

By the end of its existence as a separate university, CUST had 22 departments, 49 undergraduate programs and specializations, 33 master's-degree authorization fields, 14 doctoral-degree authorization fields, and three postdoctoral research stations. Sichuan University Archives records approximately 13,000 students, including 708 graduate students, and 3,616 members of staff at the institution.

=== Merger with Sichuan University ===
By the early 1990s, CUST and Sichuan University were two national key universities administered by the national education authorities. Their campuses were adjacent in Chengdu, and their disciplinary profiles were substantially complementary: Sichuan University was comparatively strong in the humanities and basic sciences, while CUST concentrated on engineering and applied science.

The proposed consolidation was part of a broader wave of university mergers associated with reform of China's higher-education system during the 1990s. Ministry of Education records date the merger decision to 24 November 1993. The institutional consolidation was completed in April 1994, when Sichuan University and Chengdu University of Science and Technology formally became Sichuan Union University.

The merger was among the earlier large-scale consolidations of major Chinese universities during the 1990s. The two institutions retained aspects of their previous academic structures during the initial integration, while their complementary programs were progressively reorganized within the combined university. Sichuan Union University was renamed Sichuan University in December 1998.

A further merger with the West China University of Medical Sciences in 2000 created the present structure of Sichuan University. As a result, the modern university identifies the former Sichuan University, the Chengdu University of Science and Technology, and the West China University of Medical Sciences as its three major institutional predecessors.

== Academics and research ==
CUST was organized primarily around engineering, applied science, and industrial technology. Its origins in Sichuan University's engineering college gave it longstanding programs in mechanical, electrical, civil, and hydraulic engineering, while the incorporation of the Sichuan Chemical Engineering College added chemical engineering, polymer materials, leather technology, and other light-industry disciplines.

=== Chemical engineering and light industry ===
Chemical engineering at CUST drew heavily on the faculty and programs of the former Sichuan Chemical Engineering College. Its fields included chemical process engineering, chemical machinery, inorganic chemical technology, and related industrial processes.

The university also maintained specialized programs in leather science and engineering. These drew on earlier programs transferred to the Sichuan Chemical Engineering College during the 1952 reorganization. Leather and tanning materials was designated a national key discipline at CUST in 1988. These programs became predecessors of corresponding disciplines at Sichuan University after 1994.

=== Polymer science and engineering ===
Polymer science became one of the university's best-known academic fields. Xu Xi's establishment of plastics education in the early 1950s developed into a broader program in polymer chemistry, polymer materials, and polymer processing. A Polymer Research Institute was established during the Chengdu Engineering College period, and the university subsequently developed doctoral programs in polymer materials and plastics processing.

The Ministry of Education's 1988 national key-discipline list designated polymer materials at CUST as a national key discipline. The State Key Laboratory of Polymer Materials Engineering, approved for construction in 1989, became a major research facility associated with the university and continued within Sichuan University after the merger.

=== Hydraulic and civil engineering ===
Hydraulic engineering was part of the institution from its establishment in 1954 and derived in part from the civil and hydraulic engineering programs developed at Sichuan University during the 1940s. The field expanded into hydropower, hydraulic structures, hydrology, and river engineering.

Hydraulics and river dynamics was included among CUST's national key disciplines in the 1988 Ministry of Education assessment. The university also maintained research and design activities connected with water resources and hydropower, disciplines that subsequently became part of Sichuan University's College of Water Resource and Hydropower.

== Campus and legacy ==
The main CUST campus was immediately adjacent to that of the pre-1994 Sichuan University in central Chengdu. The former Sichuan University occupied the eastern side of the area that now forms the Wangjiang Campus, while the former CUST campus occupied the western side. The two areas were originally separated by a municipal road and campus boundaries. The physical barriers between the former campuses were later removed as the combined Sichuan University integrated the sites.

CUST's strongest disciplines became important components of the enlarged Sichuan University. Its engineering lineage is represented in schools and research institutes concerned with polymer science and engineering, water resources and hydropower, chemical engineering, mechanical engineering, electrical engineering, materials, architecture and environment, and light-industry engineering. The State Key Laboratory of Polymer Materials Engineering and research traditions in hydraulic engineering and leather science also continued after the merger.

The 1994 consolidation has also been discussed in studies of China's higher-education reforms as an example of the merger of two large neighboring universities with different disciplinary strengths. The institution created by the merger, Sichuan Union University, subsequently became one of the first group of universities selected for Project 211 before taking the Sichuan University name in 1998.

== Notable people ==
=== Faculty ===
- Xu Xi (徐僖; 1921–2013), polymer scientist and academician of the Chinese Academy of Sciences. He taught at Chengdu Engineering College and CUST, served as a vice-president of CUST, and played a central role in developing the university's polymer-materials discipline and research institutes.

=== Alumni ===
- Duan Zhenji (段镇基; 1934–2009), leather and leather-chemical engineer and founding member of the Chinese Academy of Engineering. He graduated from Chengdu Engineering College in 1956 in leather and tanning technology.
- Wang Qi (王琪), polymer-processing engineer and member of the Chinese Academy of Engineering. She received her doctorate from CUST in 1989 and later became a professor at Sichuan University.
- Xu Weilin (许唯临), hydraulic engineer and member of the Chinese Academy of Engineering. He received his doctorate from CUST in 1991 and later became a professor and administrator at Sichuan University.

== Presidents ==
The heads of the institution from the establishment of Chengdu Engineering College until the 1994 merger were:

| Name | Term |
|---|---|
| Xu Qizhi (许琦之) | 1954–1956 |
| Yuan Zhongfan (袁仲凡) | 1957–1965 |
| Zheng Fang (郑方) | 1965–1982 |
| Cao Zhenzhi (曹振之) | 1982–1983 |
| Wang Jianhua (王建华) | 1983–1992 |
| Chen Junkai (陈君楷) | 1992–1994 |

Chen Junkai became the first president of Sichuan Union University following the merger.

== See also ==
- Sichuan University
- Sichuan Union University
- West China University of Medical Sciences
- 1952 reorganization of higher education in China
