= Mychal Kearse =

American basketball player (born 1983)

Personal information
- Born: November 17, 1983 (age 42) Greensboro, North Carolina, U.S.
- Listed height: 194 cm (6 ft 4 in)
- Listed weight: 93 kg (205 lb)

Career information
- High school: Providence Day (Charlotte, North Carolina); Garinger (Charlotte, North Carolina)
- College: Mount St. Mary's (2003–2007)
- NBA draft: 2007: undrafted
- Playing career: 2007–2016
- Position: Guard
- Number: 11

Career history
- 2007–2008: Proline Kings
- 2008–2010: SISU Copenhagen
- 2010: Kahraba Zouk
- 2010: GIE Morrow Disciples
- 2010–2011: Dallas Stars
- 2011–2012: CSU Sibiu
- 2012: Akita Northern Happinets
- 2013: Al Karkh
- 2013–2014: Greenville Galaxy
- 2014: Al Karkh
- 2014–2015: Al Shurtah Police
- 2015: Barrancabermeja Ciudad Futuro
- 2015–2016: Al Shurtah Police

Career highlights
- Denmark League All-star MVP

Mychal Kearse (born November 28, 1983) is an American former professional basketball player. He played college basketball at Mount St. Mary's University and high school basketball at Providence Day School.

== College statistics ==
Year	Team	GP	GS	MPG	FG%	3P%	FT%	RPG	APG	SPG	BPG	PPG
2003–04	Mount St. Mary's	29	23	25.1	.376	.200	.707	5.59	1.93	1.31	0.10	6.52
2004–05	Mount St. Mary's	27	27	27.4	.474	.333	.659	6.48	2.11	1.07	0.00	8.96
2005–06	Mount St. Mary's	28	28	26.7	.408	.243	.772	7.93	1.64	1.64	0.46	10.57
2006–07	Mount St. Mary's	29	29	30.4	.404	.154	.802	5.90	1.66	1.34	0.28	11.48
Career		113	107	27.4	.414	.237	.746	6.46	1.83	1.35	0.21	9.38

=== NCAA Awards & Honors ===
- NEC Defensive POY – 2006, 2007
- NEC All-Rookie Team – 2004

== Career statistics ==
Legend
GP	Games played	GS	Games started	MPG	Minutes per game
FG%	Field goal percentage	3P%	3-point field goal percentage	FT%	Free throw percentage
RPG	Rebounds per game	APG	Assists per game	SPG	Steals per game
BPG	Blocks per game	PPG	Points per game	**Bold**	Career high

=== Regular season ===
Year	Team	GP	GS	MPG	FG%	3P%	FT%	RPG	APG	SPG	BPG	PPG
2008–09	SISU	15		29.9	.447	.212	.714	8.3	1.7	2.7	0.3	21.7
2009–10	SISU	26		35.7	.479	.230	.833	7.3	2.2	2.0	0.2	23.0
2011–12	Akita	26	17	21.0	.367	.219	.733	5.4	2.6	1.3	0.2	9.4
2011–12	Sibiu	12	1	27.1	.485	.378	.768	6.25	2.17	1.42	0.33	18.50

=== Playoffs ===
Year	Team	GP	GS	MPG	FG%	3P%	FT%	RPG	APG	SPG	BPG	PPG
2008–09	SISU	2		28.0	.346	.125	.625	4.0	1.5	2.0	0.0	12.0
2009–10	SISU	2		36.0	.500	.273	.909	8.5	3.0	4.5	1.0	28.5
2011–12	Akita	4		18.3	.348	.222	1.000	5.0	4.3	1.0	0.0	5.0
