= Yuta Watanabe =

Japanese basketball player (born 1994)

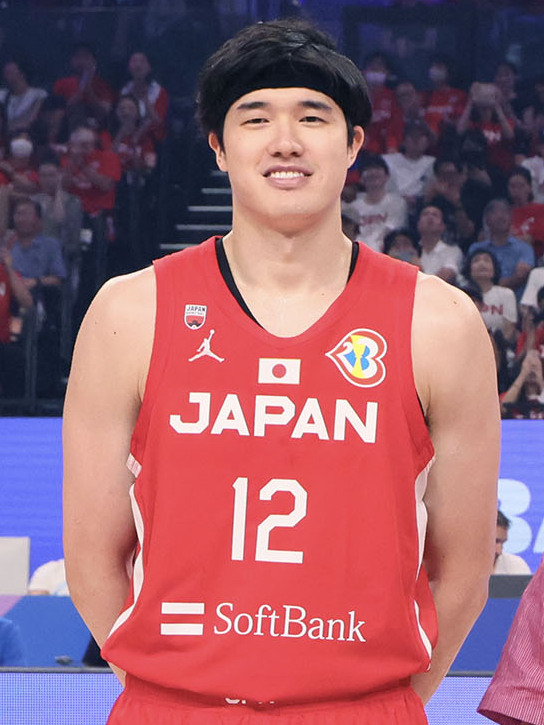
- Watanabe with the Japan national team in 2023

No. 1 – Chiba Jets Funabashi
- Position: Small forward / power forward
- League: B.League

Personal information
- Born: October 13, 1994 (age 32) Yokohama, Japan
- Listed height: 6 ft 9 in (2.06 m)
- Listed weight: 215 lb (98 kg)

Career information
- High school: Jinsei Gakuen (Zentsūji, Japan); St. Thomas More (Oakdale, Connecticut)
- College: George Washington (2014–2018)
- NBA draft: 2018: undrafted
- Playing career: 2018–present

Career history
- 2018–2020: Memphis Grizzlies
- 2018–2020: →Memphis Hustle
- 2020–2022: Toronto Raptors
- 2022: →Raptors 905
- 2022–2023: Brooklyn Nets
- 2023–2024: Phoenix Suns
- 2024: Memphis Grizzlies
- 2024–present: Chiba Jets Funabashi

Career highlights
- Atlantic 10 Defensive Player of the Year (2018); Third-team All-Atlantic 10 (2018); 2× Atlantic 10 All-Defensive Team (2017, 2018)
- Stats at NBA.com
- Stats at Basketball Reference
Medals
Men's basketball
Representing Japan
East Asia Basketball Championship
Bronze medal – third place	2013 Incheon	Team

Yuta Watanabe (渡邊 雄太, Watanabe Yūta; born October 13, 1994) is a Japanese professional basketball player for the Chiba Jets Funabashi of the B.League. He played college basketball in the United States for the George Washington Colonials (now Revolutionaries), becoming the first Japanese-born student athlete to secure an NCAA Division I basketball scholarship. He was named Atlantic 10 Defensive Player of the Year in 2018. He has also represented the Japan national team, helping them win the bronze medal at the 2013 East Asia Basketball Championship.

Before moving to the collegiate level, Watanabe attended Jinsei Gakuen High School in Zentsūji, Kagawa. He later transferred to St. Thomas More Preparatory School in Oakdale, Connecticut in 2013. Watanabe rose to fame in his high school program, and was one of their most valuable players in the National Prep School Invitational as a senior in 2014. In college, he became the fourth-ever Japanese-born Division I basketball player.

== High school career ==
Watanabe attended Jinsei Gakuen High School in Kagawa. He led the basketball team to the runner-up spot of the All-Japan High School Basketball Tournament in his final two years with the program. While in Jinsei Gakuen, Watanabe said his career goal was to make it to the NCAA and ultimately join the NBA.

In late 2013, Watanabe traveled to the United States and attended St. Thomas More Preparatory School in Oakdale, Connecticut. At the conclusion of his sole high school season outside his native country, Watanabe averaged 13 points and six rebounds. He helped the team reach a 26–8 overall record and a ticket to the National Prep Championship game. On January 31, 2014, in his first appearance in the annual National Prep School Invitational, Watanabe scored 12 points versus Suffield Academy. He contributed 20 points and six rebounds in a 70–61 victory against Canarias Basketball Academy from Spain. As a result, he was named to the National Prep School Invitational All-Tournament Team and garnered prestigious New England Preparatory School Athletic Council (NEPSAC) Class AAA First Team All-League honors. Watanabe was also labeled "the Chosen One" by The Japan Times.

Watanabe was rated a 77 (three-star recruit) by ESPN Recruiting Nation. He was also given a three-star rating by Scout.com and the same composite grade.

== College career ==
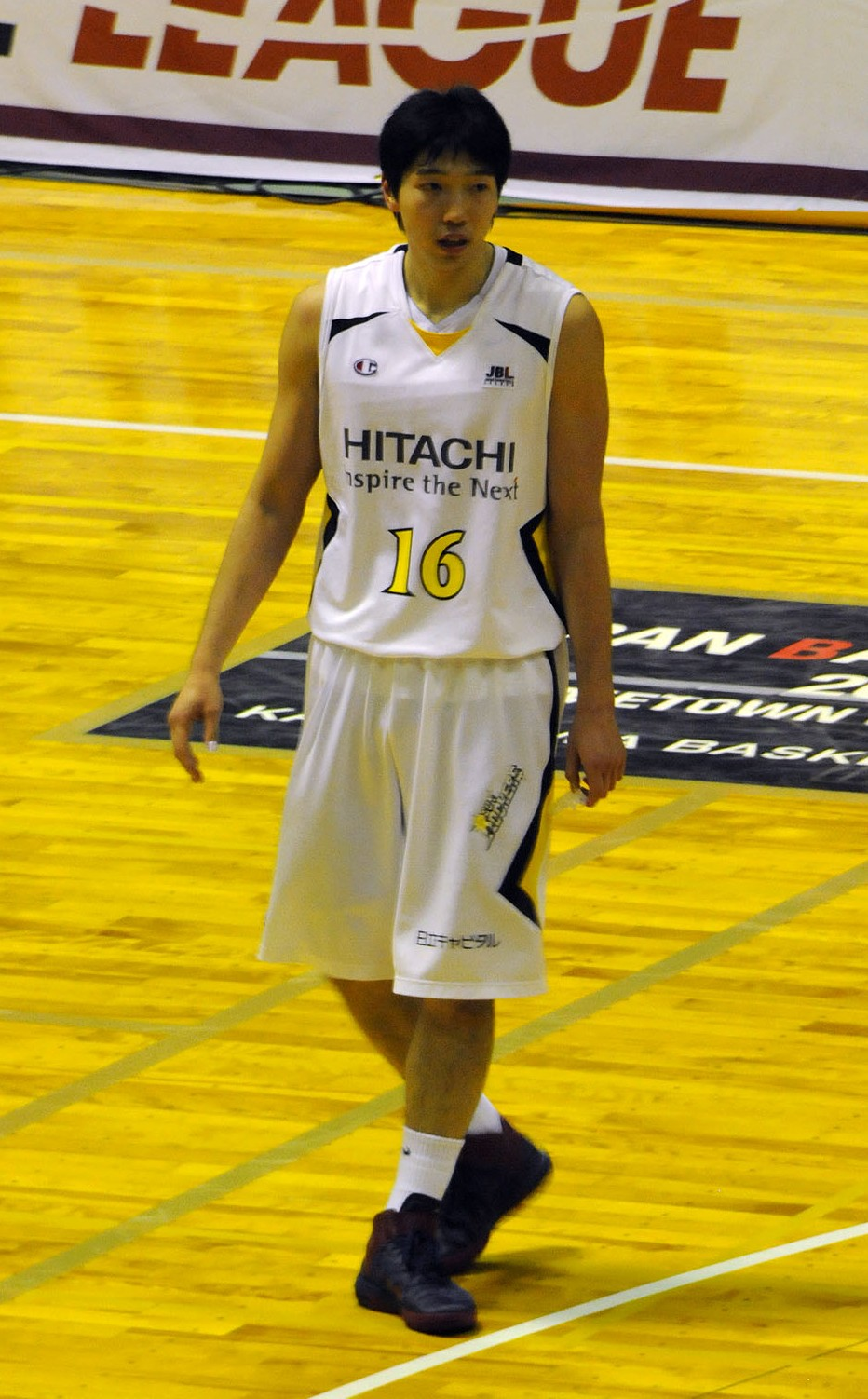
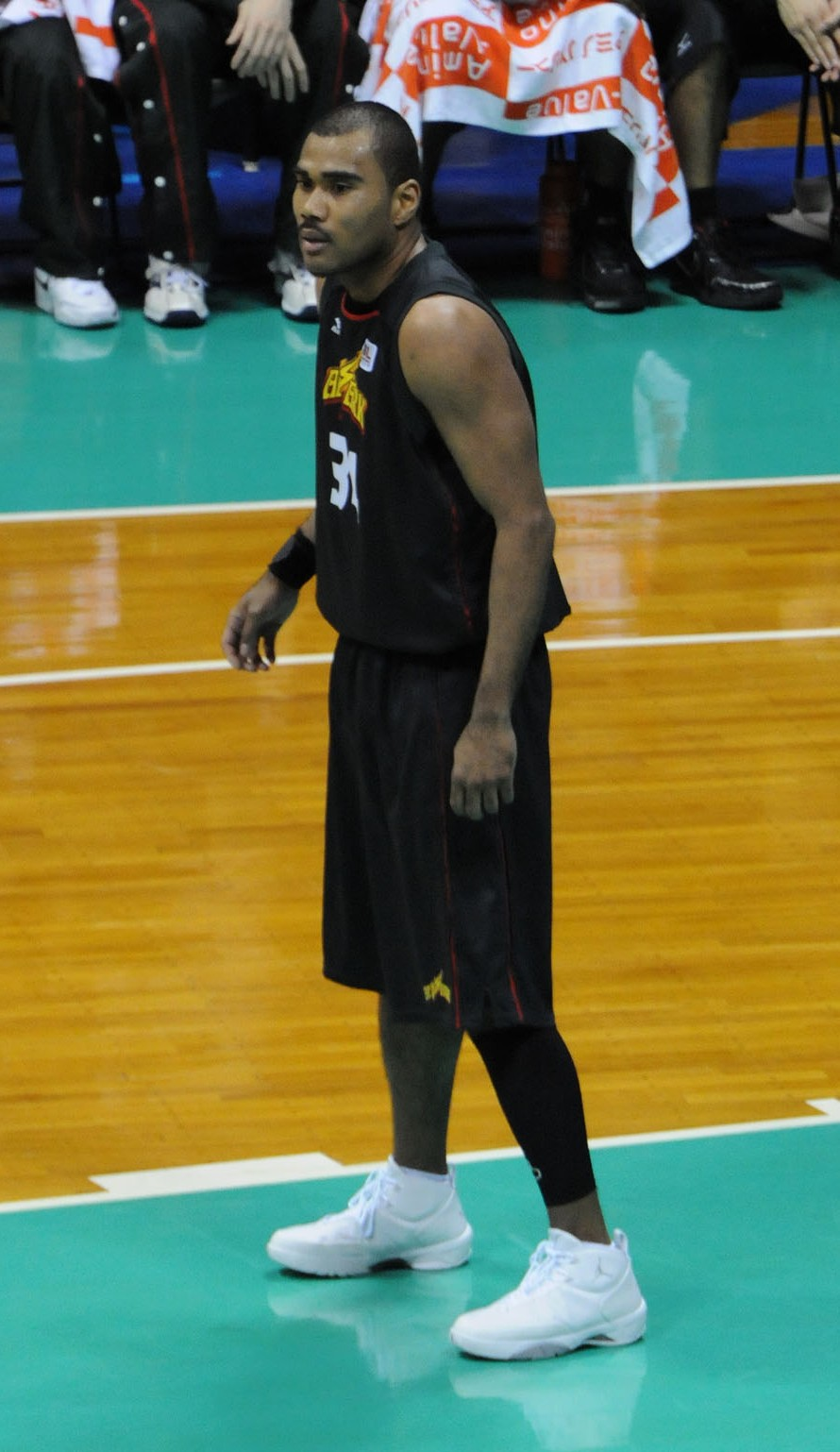
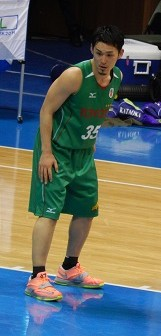
Watanabe was the fourth Japan-born basketball player to compete in NCAA Division I, the first three being KJ Matsui (left), Michael Takahashi (center), and Taishi Ito (right)

In fall 2014, George Washington Colonials head coach Mike Lonergan received a phone call from Jamie Cosgrove, a coach at Trinity College who saw Watanabe play with St. Thomas More. Watanabe eventually committed to play for GWU. This allowed him to attend GWU in the 2014-15 year as a freshman. It was made official when Watanabe posted the message through Twitter, "I've decided to go to George Washington University. The school has a good basketball team, too. I'm sure I'll have hard times both in basketball and academics, but I'll give it my best shot." According to ESPN, his second option was Fordham, who gave Watanabe an offer to join their team as well. He became the first Japanese-born male player to get an NCAA Division I basketball scholarship and just the fourth to play college basketball at that level. (Note: The other three were KJ Matsui (Columbia), Taishi Ito (Portland) and Michael Takahashi (Cal State Northridge).) Regarding Watanabe's collegiate career, former Japanese college basketball player KJ Matsui said, "It's good for Nabe-chan (Watanabe) to play at a competitive team, but he's going to have to battle for playing time." The Colonials had four other recruits coming into the program for 2014–15: Anthony Swan, Darian Bryant, Matt Cimino, and Paul Jorgensen.

After he joined George Washington in 2014, featured profiles of Watanabe were published by major American newspapers such as The New York Times and The Washington Post. On Watanabe's athletic caliber and exceptional career breakthrough into the NBA, where players of East Asian descent are uncommon, former Richmond Spiders men's basketball player and half-Chinese Zach Chu said, "To see someone of Asian descent, and play as well as he does, it's cool for college basketball, really cool for the Asian community." The George Washington athletics website received the second-most views from Japan in hits by country, ranked behind only the U.S. On many occasions, he was congratulated on the school's campus. Speaking on his ethnic and racial background, sporting fame and athletic legacy, he said, "Japanese are thinking Americans are bigger and taller and more athletic. They are thinking it's more difficult for Japanese to play in NCAA, but I'm playing right now, so I want to make other people come to the United States." NBA-bound players of East Asian ancestry such as Matsui, Yao Ming, Jeremy Lin, and Yuki Togashi have been the target of racist comments in the past, but Watanabe apparently did not receive racially insensitive remarks in his first few years in the NBA and the U.S. Nevertheless, he said, "If they said something racist, I don't care."

=== Freshman ===
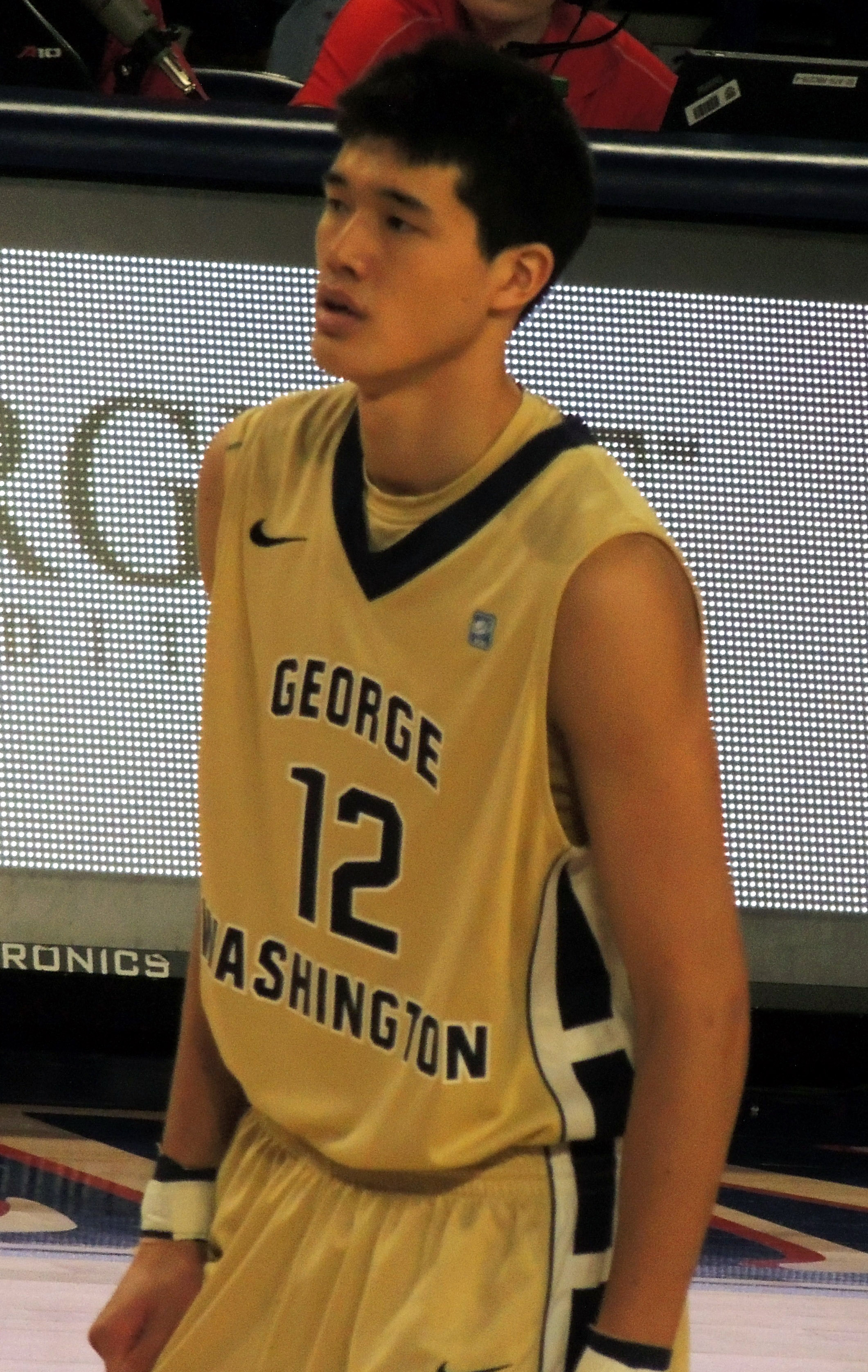
Watanabe playing for George Washington in February 2015

On November 14, 2014, Watanabe made his debut for George Washington, against Grambling State, finishing with eight points, seven rebounds and a block in 20 minutes, contributing to the team's 92–40 win, its largest win since 1999. On December 12, Watanabe was named Atlantic 10 Rookie of the Week after averaging 9.0 points and 4.7 rebounds in three games as he helped the team win the 2014 Diamond Head Classic crown. Watanabe hit a key three-pointer with 3 minutes and 32 seconds remaining to upset Wichita State with a 60–54 win on December 25. On March 7, he set a career-high 21 points, knocking down seven 3-pointers, against Massachusetts. On March 9, Watanabe earned his second Atlantic 10 Rookie of the Week honor, becoming the first to earn multiple Rookie of the Week awards in the same season since Lasan Kromah earned three in 2009–10. He led the Colonials to a 2–0 final week of the Atlantic 10 regular season with a team-best 13.5 points on 53 percent shooting, including 64 percent behind the arc, along with five rebounds and two assists.

As a freshman, Watanabe was a key bench player and an instrumental element on the Colonials' rotation. He was often awarded playing time in late-game situations. Head coach Mike Lonergan said, "With Yuta, we have scoring off the bench. If I start Yuta, we have no scoring off the bench at all."

=== Sophomore ===
On March 5, 2016, Watanabe posted career-highs in scoring and assists with 22 points and six assists in George Washington's 87–80 loss to Davidson. On March 31, he logged a team-high 19 points and a career-high four blocks as George Washington won the 2016 National Invitation Tournament with a 76–60 win over Valparaiso. It was the first time in program history the team won a postseason championship.

Overall, Watanabe was the team's leader in blocked shots with 40, ranking second in the Atlantic 10. His 8.4 points per game was the fifth best on the team.

=== Junior ===
On November 15, 2016, Watanabe logged his first double-double with 13 points and 12 rebounds in a 77–75 victory over Siena. On January 8, 2017, he had a career-high three steals in a game against Richmond. Watanabe scored a season-high 21 points in an 80–71 loss against Illinois on March 20.

As a junior, Watanabe was the second-leading scorer at George Washington at 12.2 points per game. He was also named to the Atlantic 10 All-Defensive Team.

=== Senior ===
On November 20, 2017, Watanabe grabbed a career-high 13 rebounds versus Rider. On November 29, he logged a career-high five steals against Morgan State. In his final game for the Colonials on February 28, 2018, Watanabe scored a career-high 31 points in a 72–56 win over Fordham .

As a senior, Watanabe was George Washington's leading scorer at 16.3 points per game and second-leading rebounder with 6.1 per game, while also leading the team in blocks with 54. He was named the Atlantic 10 Defensive Player of the Year, becoming the first Colonial to win the award. Watanabe also made the Atlantic 10 All-Conference's Third Team and Atlantic 10 All-Defensive Team. He also received George Washington's Patricio Garino Defensive Award and Mike Brown MVP Award, both awards named after the former basketball alumni.

At the conclusion of Watanabe's college career, he ranked near the top of key categories in GWU history including second in blocked shots (147), second in games played (134) and 15th in scoring (1,460).

== Professional career ==
=== Memphis Grizzlies (2018–2020) ===
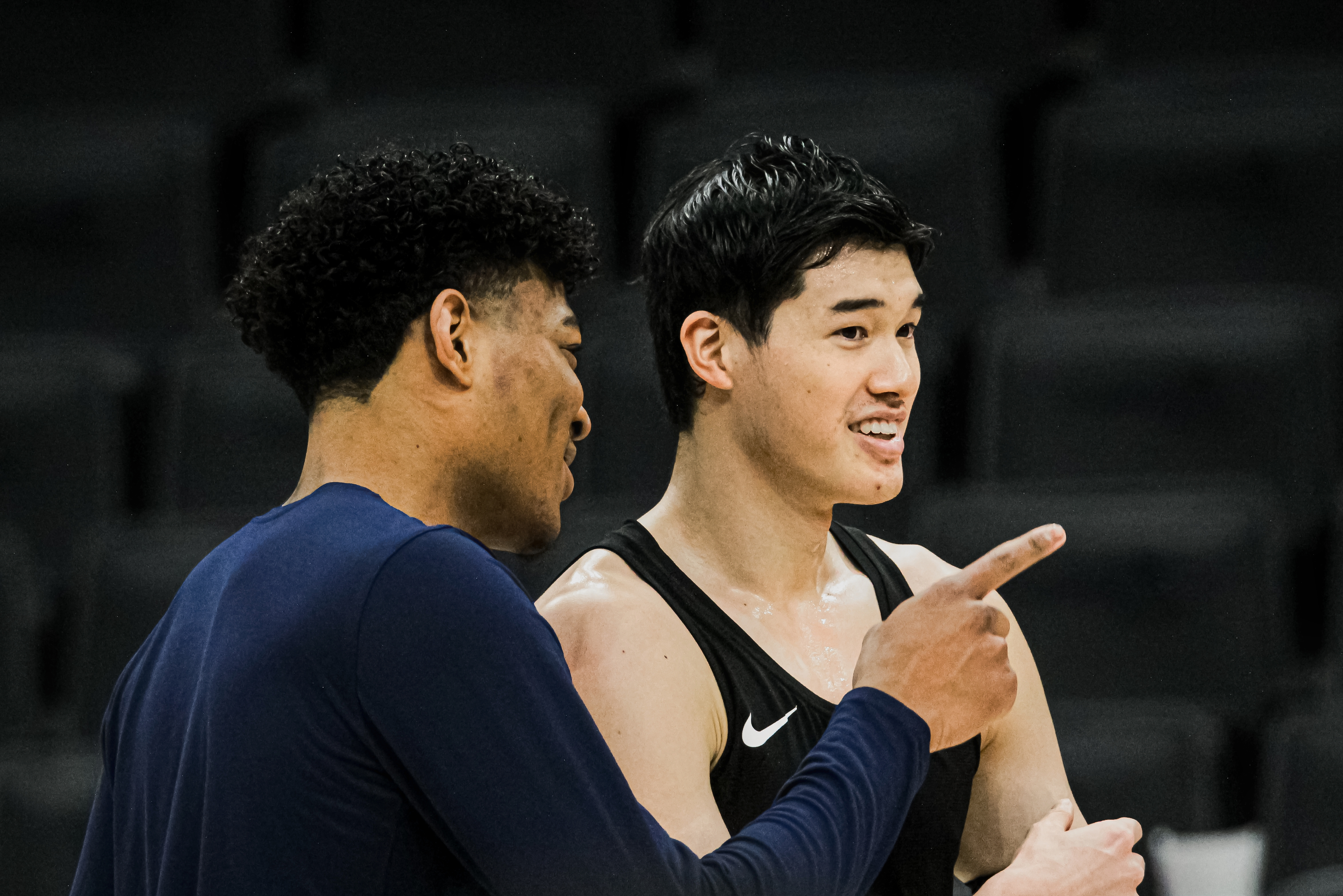
Watanabe (right) and Rui Hachimura in 2020

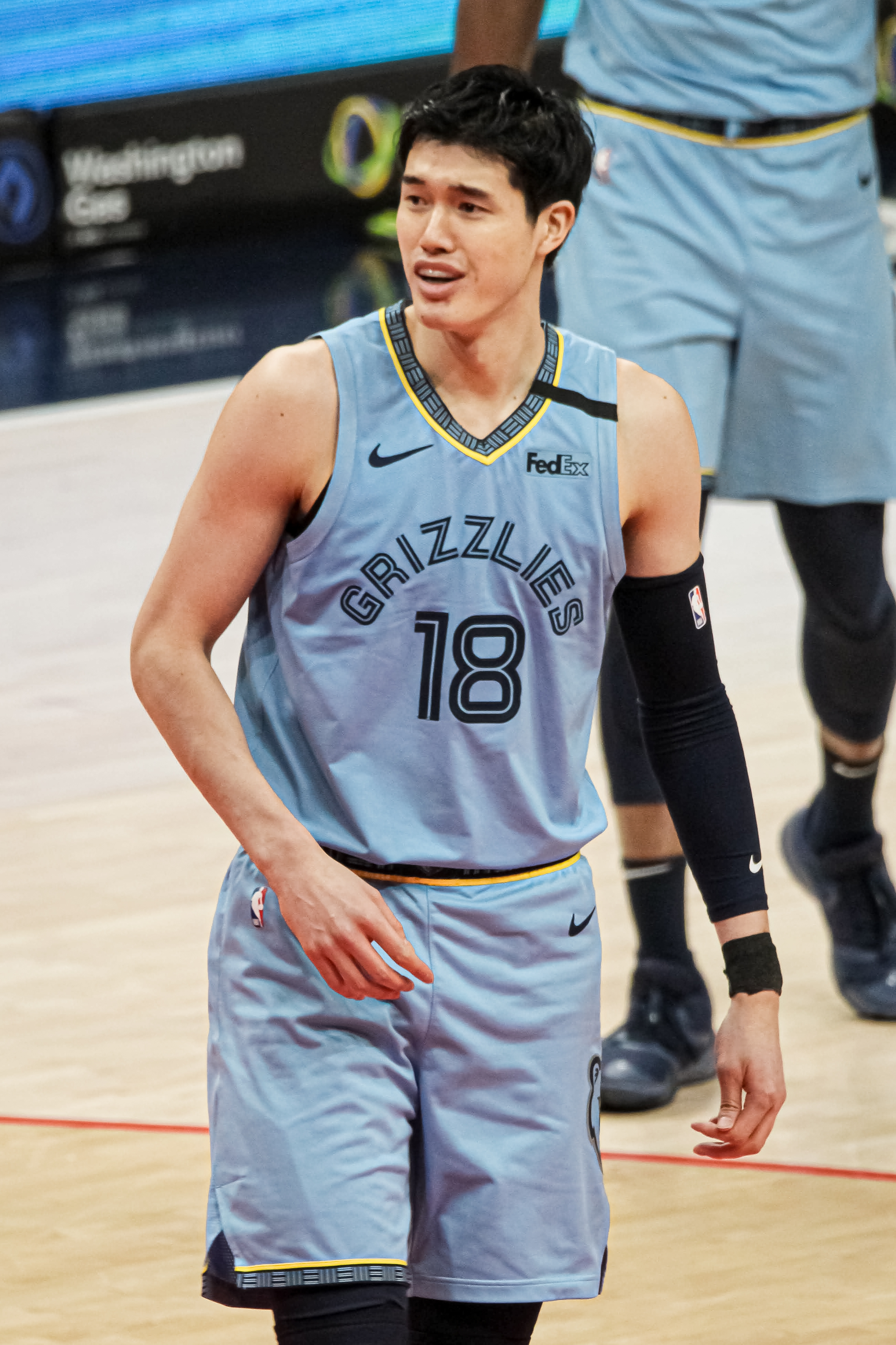
Watanabe with the Grizzlies in 2020

After going undrafted in the 2018 NBA draft, Watanabe played for the Brooklyn Nets in the 2018 NBA Summer League. Afterwards, he signed a two-way contract with the Memphis Grizzlies and their NBA G League affiliate, the Memphis Hustle. On October 27, 2018, Watanabe made his NBA debut, coming off the bench with two points and two rebounds in a 117–96 win over the Phoenix Suns. He became the second Japanese player to play in the NBA after Yuta Tabuse, who debuted with the Phoenix Suns in 2004. Though he spent the majority of the season in the G League with the Hustle, the Grizzlies were third behind the Los Angeles Lakers and Golden State Warriors in merchandise sold in Japan due to Watanabe's presence. In the G League, Watanabe started in 32 of 33 games, averaging 14.2 points, 7.2 rebounds, 2.6 assists and 1.1 blocks in 33.9 minutes while shooting 43.6 percent from the field and 33.1 percent from 3-point range.

Watanabe shared his time playing back and forth for the Grizzlies and the Hustle for the season. On December 14, 2019, Watanabe and Rui Hachimura of the Washington Wizards became the first pair of Japanese players to share the court in the NBA. On January 4, 2020, Watanabe had a team-high 28 points on 12-of-19 field goal shooting and 2-of-4 from three, to go with seven rebounds, four blocks, two assists and two steals in the Hustle's 130–127 win over the Iowa Wolves. He scored a career-high 40 points on 14-of-20 shooting from the field and 8-of-11 from three on January 22, in a win versus the Delaware Blue Coats. Watanabe was named Midseason All-NBA G League for the Western Conference. In the G League, Watanabe started in all 22 games, averaging 17.2 points, 6.0 rebounds, 1.9 assists, 1.0 steal and 1.0 block in 32.7 minutes while shooting 54.6 percent from the field and 36.4 percent from 3-point range.

=== Toronto Raptors (2020–2022) ===
On November 27, 2020, Watanabe signed an Exhibit 10 deal with the Toronto Raptors to join their pre-season roster. On December 19, his deal was converted to a two-way contract, after he made the team out of pre-season. On December 31, Watanabe debuted for the Toronto Raptors, recording four rebounds, one assist, a block and a steal across nine minutes in a 100–83 win over New York Knicks, notching their first victory of the season. On January 29, 2021, Watanabe scored a then career-high 12 points coming off the bench, along with six rebounds, two assists and two steals in a season-high 24 minutes of action in a 126–124 loss to the Sacramento Kings. In the fourth quarter, Watanabe logged seven points including a layup that cut the lead to one point. On February 9, Watanabe sustained a left ankle injury during a workout. After missing four games, he returned to action on February 18, logging two rebounds and a block across six minutes of play in a 110–96 win over the Milwaukee Bucks. On March 4, Watanabe made his first career start against the Detroit Pistons, going scoreless but grabbing four rebounds in 11 minutes of action.

On April 10, 2021, Watanabe scored a then career-high 14 points coming off the bench on 6-of-7 field goal shooting and 2-of-2 from three, including a buzzer beater 3-pointer that gave the Raptors a season-high lead in a quarter with 47–26 in the first, to go along with five rebounds, an assist and a steal across 23 minutes of action in a 135–115 win over the Cleveland Cavaliers. On April 16, Watanabe surpassed his career-high in scoring for the second time in a week with 21 points on 7-of-11 shooting from the field and 2-of-4 from three, along with six rebounds, two assists and one block across 26 minutes in a 113–102 win over the Orlando Magic. On April 18, Watanabe logged his third consecutive double-digit scoring game with 10 points, shooting 3-for-6 from the field and 1-for-2 from three, in addition to four rebounds and four assists in 29 minutes off the bench in a 112–106 win over the Oklahoma City Thunder. The double-digit scoring streak was the longest in his three-year NBA career. On April 19, the Raptors announced they had converted Watanabe's two-way deal to a standard contract. Despite being a two-way player, Watanabe never played in the G League with the Raptors 905.

Due to a left calf sprain, Watanabe missed the first 18 games of the 2021–22 season. He returned on November 24, 2021, posting three points and two blocks in 14 minutes of play against the Memphis Grizzlies. On December 14, Watanabe logged his first career double-double with 12 points coming off the bench on 5-of-8 field goal shooting and 2-of-4 from three and a then career-high 11 rebounds, to go along with two assists and a steal across 26 minutes of action in a 124–101 win over the Sacramento Kings. On December 26, Watanabe posted his second double-double with 26 points and 13 rebounds, both career-highs, in a 144–99 loss to the Cleveland Cavaliers.

=== Brooklyn Nets (2022–2023) ===
On August 28, 2022, Watanabe signed with the Brooklyn Nets in free agency. During November 2022, Watanabe led the NBA in three point shooting percentage at that point in the 2022–23 season. Watanabe would have his best career season shooting from beyond the arc at 44.4%.

=== Phoenix Suns (2023–2024) ===
On July 4, 2023, Watanabe signed with the Phoenix Suns.

=== Return to Memphis (2024) ===
On February 8, 2024, Watanabe was traded back to the Memphis Grizzlies in a three-team trade involving the Brooklyn Nets.

Following the conclusion of the regular season, Watanabe announced his intent to decline his player option for the following season and return to Japan to play professionally there.

=== Chiba Jets Funabashi (2024–present) ===
On July 11, 2024, Watanabe signed with the Chiba Jets Funabashi of the B.League.

== National team career ==
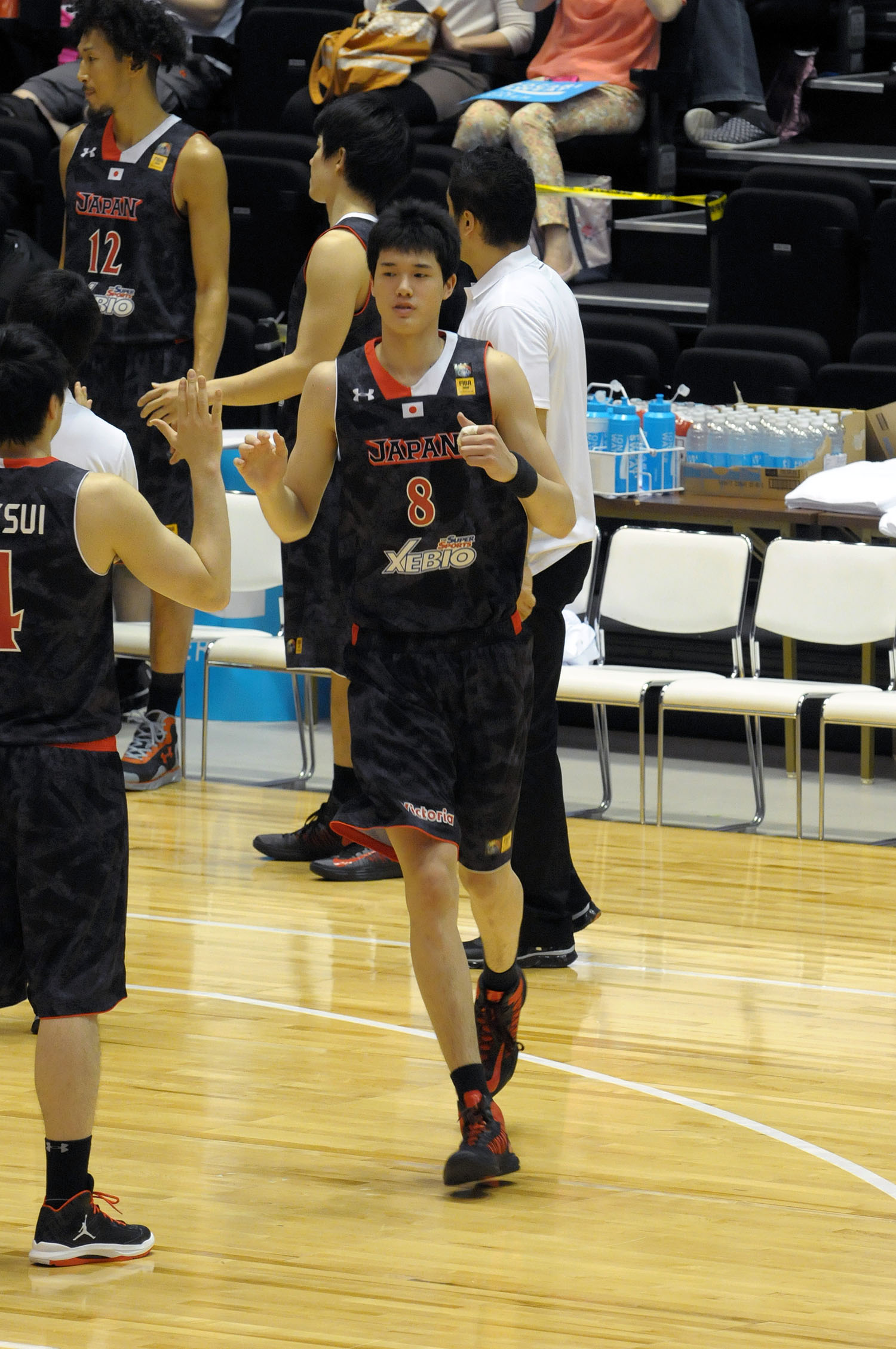
Watanabe with the Japanese national team

The Japan men's national basketball team's then head coach Kimikazu Suzuki oversaw Watanabe's play in camps, saying at the time, "He's not good enough to be on this team yet, but eventually he's going to be [Japan's] ace player. We all know his capabilities and we intend to help him develop." Later, while attending Jinsei Gakuen High School, Watanabe was called up by Suzuki to compete with the national team in 2013. At the age of 18, he made his senior debut for Japan at the 2013 East Asia Basketball Championship, where he helped the team win the bronze medal. Watanabe's tournament highlights included a 22-point and 14-rebound outing in a 101–53 win over Macau. At the 2013 FIBA Asia Championship, he averaged 5.2 points, 1.2 rebounds, and 0.5 assists in four games played, helping the team finish in ninth place. Watanabe was named to the 12-man roster for the 2016 FIBA Olympic Qualifying Tournament, where he averaged 7.0 points, 4.0 rebounds and 1.0 assists. At the 2019 FIBA World Cup Asian Qualifiers, Watanabe, who only played in two of 12 games, tallied an average of 17.5 points, 3.0 rebounds, 1.5 steals and 1.5 blocks per game. Later that year, he was selected to compete at the 2019 FIBA Basketball World Cup. Watanabe played in all five games, averaging 15.6 points, 5.6 rebounds and 1.6 assists per game. He led the Japanese squad in points and efficiency per game.

== Player profile ==
A spark-off-the-bench player, Watanabe is known for his defensive ability. As described by sports website theScore, Watanabe "has great hands on the defensive end." In 2019, SB Nation sportswriter Brandon Abraham lauded his defense, saying, "The Grizzlies and Hustle were simply better with Yuta on the court." Memphis Grizzlies TV play-by-play announcer Pete Pranica described his "defensive instinct" as "impressive." Toronto Raptors head coach Nick Nurse commented on his defense as well, saying that it "rub off on others." Watanabe earned praises for his basketball IQ, with theScore commenting, "He always seems to be in the right spot on both ends of the court." Pranica stated that Watanabe's IQ is one of his "greatest assets." Memphis Hustle assistant coach Antoine Broxsie was also impressed by his IQ. Watanabe's play has been described as "mistake-free." Nurse said in multiple interviews that Watanabe "doesn’t make mistakes" during games. Pranica also remarked that Watanabe "rarely made the same mistake twice after having been coached on it." His energy and hustle has also become his defining trait in the NBA, impressing Nurse and fans. In addition, Watanabe has been praised for being constantly in motion, which helped him to "always be a step ahead of the opposing offence" as noted by Raptors HQ of SB Nation. Sports Illustrated observed that Watanabe "plays like his feet are on fire," and that he is "constantly running around, jumping in and out of attacking lanes, and wreaking havoc on opposing offences." Nurse also stated that his constant motion helps the team's offence. Watanabe has been criticized because of his lack of weight and muscle from his college career even until he turned professional. George Washington head coach Mike Lonergan said that he hoped that he weighed over 200 pounds by the start of his sophomore season. KJ Matsui commented on his frame as well, saying, "If he puts more muscles and get big, he will be unstoppable." Pranica also pointed out that Watanabe "needs to get physically bigger and stronger so that he is not overmatched."

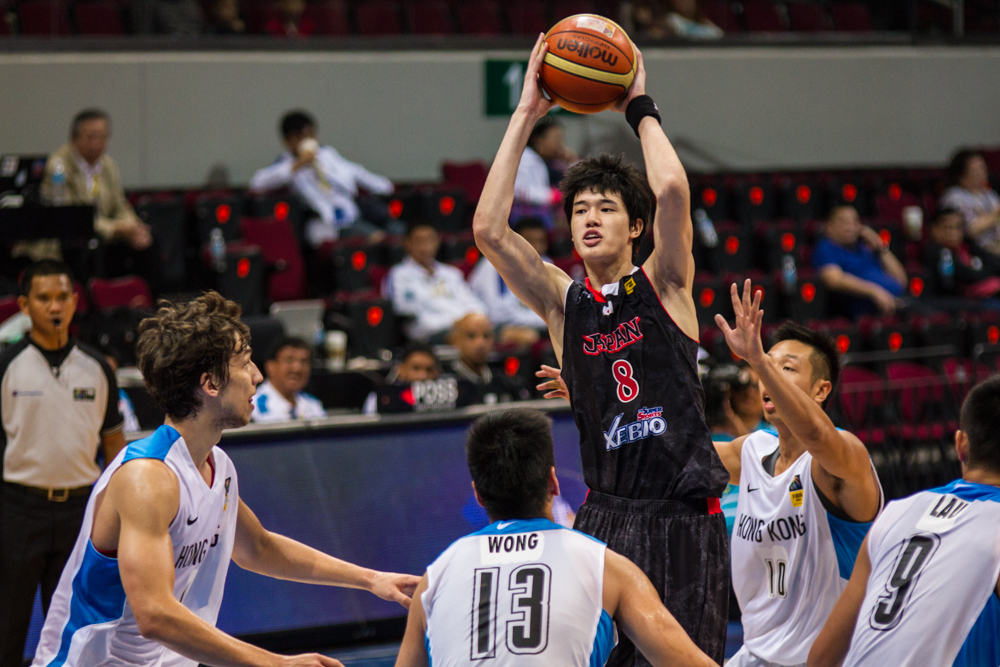
Watanabe against Hong Kong in 2013

Watanabe supposedly lacked panache at the time he joined the George Washington basketball program, with teammate Kevin Larsen commenting, "We told him to find a new celebration because the one he had wasn't cutting it. He was, like, jumping in the air making a weird face. So we tried to help him find a new one." Watanabe sometimes mimics Carmelo Anthony, using the "three to the dome" celebration after making three-pointers.

== Personal life ==
Watanabe was born on October 13, 1994, in Yokohama, Kanagawa, in Japan, and grew up in Miki, Kagawa. Watanabe's family has a rich history in basketball. His mother, Kumi, played for the Chanson V-Magic and the Japan women's national team. His father played for the Kumagai Gumi Bruins at the professional level. Watanabe's sister, Yuki, played with the Aisin AW Wings. During his childhood, Watanabe's favorite NBA team was the Los Angeles Lakers and his favorite athlete was Kobe Bryant.

Former Fuji TV announcer Akiko Kuji and Watanabe announced on May 26, 2022, that they have registered their marriage. On 13 April 2026, his wife gave birth to their first child.

== Career statistics ==
Legend
GP	Games played	GS	Games started	MPG	Minutes per game
FG%	Field goal percentage	3P%	3-point field goal percentage	FT%	Free throw percentage
RPG	Rebounds per game	APG	Assists per game	SPG	Steals per game
BPG	Blocks per game	PPG	Points per game	**Bold**	Career high

=== NBA ===
==== Regular season ====
Year	Team	GP	GS	MPG	FG%	3P%	FT%	RPG	APG	SPG	BPG	PPG
2018–19	Memphis	15	0	11.6	.294	.125	.700	2.1	.5	.3	.1	2.6
2019–20	Memphis	18	0	5.8	.441	.375	.375	1.1	.3	.3	.1	2.0
2020–21	Toronto	**50**	**4**	14.5	.439	.400	**.828**	**3.2**	.8	.5	**.4**	4.4
2021–22	Toronto	38	**4**	11.7	.406	.342	.600	2.4	.6	.3	**.4**	4.3
2022–23	Brooklyn	58	1	16.0	**.491**	**.444**	.723	2.4	.8	.4	.3	**5.6**
2023–24	Phoenix	29	0	13.2	.361	.320	.667	1.6	.3	.3	.2	3.6
2023–24	Memphis	5	0	**16.4**	.316	.100	.000	1.8	**1.0**	**.6**	.0	2.6
Career		213	9	13.3	.426	.370	.675	2.3	.6	.4	.3	4.2

==== Playoffs ====
Year	Team	GP	GS	MPG	FG%	3P%	FT%	RPG	APG	SPG	BPG	PPG
2022	Toronto	**4**	0	2.6	.333	.000	—	.0	.0	.0	.0	1.0
2023	Brooklyn	1	0	**4.7**	**.500**	**.500**	.000	**1.0**	.0	.0	.0	**3.0**
Career		5	0	3.0	.375	.333	.000	.2	.0	.0	.0	1.4

=== College ===
Year	Team	GP	GS	MPG	FG%	3P%	FT%	RPG	APG	SPG	BPG	PPG
2014–15	George Washington	35	10	22.5	.384	.348	**.831**	3.5	.6	.4	.6	7.4
2015–16	George Washington	**38**	**37**	27.7	.422	.306	.707	4.0	1.4	.6	1.1	8.4
2016–17	George Washington	28	27	35.1	**.444**	.314	.817	4.8	**2.5**	**1.1**	1.1	12.2
2017–18	George Washington	33	33	**36.6**	.437	**.364**	.807	**6.1**	1.6	.8	**1.6**	**16.3**
Career		134	107	30.1	.425	.337	.788	4.5	1.4	.7	1.1	10.9

== See also ==
- Basketball in Japan
- Basketball in the United States
