= Gong Luming =

Chinese basketball player (born 1957)

Gong Luming 宫鲁鸣
Personal information
- Born: August 29, 1957 (age 69) Muping, Shandong, China
- Listed height: 1.72 m (5 ft 8 in)

Career information
- Playing career: 1973–1991

Career history

Coaching
- 1991–1995: China (assistant)
- 1995–1996: China
- 1999–2005: China Women
- 2014–2016: China
- 2021–2022: Shandong Hi-Speed Kirin
- 2025–present: China Women
Medals
Men's basketball
Representing China
FIBA Asia Cup
Gold medal – first place	1987 Bangkok
Gold medal – first place	1989 Beijing
Asian Games
Gold medal – first place	1986 Seoul
Gold medal – first place	1990 Beijing

Gong Luming (Chinese: 宫鲁鸣; pinyin: Gōng Lǔmíng; born 29 August 1957) is a Chinese former professional basketball player and current head coach of the China women's national basketball team.

== Career ==
As a player, he was part of the China sides that competed in the 1988 Summer Olympics and the 1990 FIBA World Championship.

Following his retirement from playing, he became a coach and led the Chinese national team in the 1996 Summer Olympics, with an eighth-place finish. He coached the national women's side at the 2004 Summer Olympics but they failed to make the last eight after being defeated by New Zealand.

Gong then left coaching to become an official at the Chinese Basketball Association. In 2009 he was touted as the media's favourite to replace dismissed coach Jonas Kazlauskas at the helm of the national team, however he dismissed the speculation and pulled his name from contention.

He would finally return to coach the Chinese national men's team in early 2014 with the task of rebuilding the team after a dismal 2013 FIBA Asia Championship that had cost his predecessor Panagiotis Giannakis his position after a quarterfinal exit. After leading China to the 2015 FIBA Asia Championship title, Gong was confirmed in his position in order to lead the side in the 2016 Olympics.

Gong resigned from his post as the head coach of the Chinese national team on January 6, 2017.
