= Li Nan (basketball) =

Chinese basketball player

Li Nan 李楠
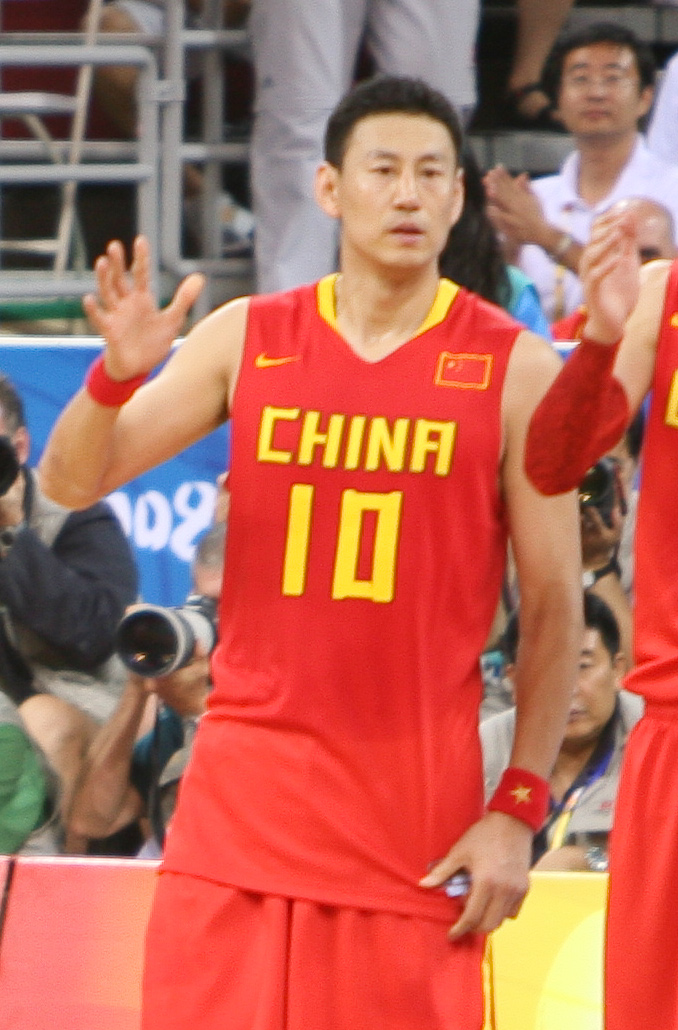
- Li Nan - Beijing 2008 Olympics

Beijing Ducks
- Title: Head coach
- League: CBA

Personal information
- Born: 25 September 1974 (age 52) Harbin, Heilongjiang, China
- Listed height: 6 ft 6 in (1.98 m)
- Listed weight: 230 lb (104 kg)

Career information
- Playing career: 1994–2009
- Position: Small forward

Career history

Playing
- 1994–2009: Bayi Rockets

Coaching
- 2017–2019: China
- 2020–2023: Jiangsu Dragons
- 2026–present: Beijing Ducks
Medals
Men's basketball
Representing China
FIBA Asia Cup
Bronze medal – third place	1997 Riyadh
Gold medal – first place	1999 Fukuoka
Gold medal – first place	2003 Harbin
Gold medal – first place	2005 Doha
Asian Games
Gold medal – first place	1998 Bangkok
Silver medal – second place	2002 Busan
Gold medal – first place	2006 Doha
East Asian Games
Silver medal – second place	1997 Busan
Gold medal – first place	2001 Osaka
ABC Under-18 Championship
Silver medal – second place	1995 Manila
ABC Under-22 Championship
Silver medal – second place	1996 Shanghai

Li Nan (Chinese: 李楠; pinyin: Lí Nǎn, born September 25, 1974, in Harbin, Heilongjiang) is a former professional basketball player from China. Before his retirement in 2009, he played for the Bayi Rockets, a Chinese Basketball Association team based in Ningbo, Zhejiang. As a small forward, he is 1.98 m (6 ft 6 in) tall and weighs 104 kg (229 lb).

Li participated in four Olympics: the 1996 Atlanta Olympics Basketball Tournament, 2000 Sydney Olympics Basketball Tournament, 2004 Athens Olympics Basketball Tournament and 2008 Beijing Olympics Basketball Tournament in Beijing.

At the 2000 Olympics, Li Nan scored 25 points on 6 three-pointers in a win against Italy.

In April 2017, it was reported that Li was appointed as the head coach of one of the two Chinese national basketball teams formed by the Chinese Basketball Association in preparation for the 2019 FIBA Basketball World Cup and 2020 Summer Olympics. Li was assigned to coach the China Red team which will participate in competitive play in 2017 while Du Feng will mentor the China Blue team which will compete in 2018.
