= China men's national basketball team =

Men's national basketball team representing China

China
- FIBA ranking: 30 (1 September 2026)
- Joined FIBA: 1936
- FIBA zone: FIBA Asia
- National federation: CBA
- Coach: Guo Shiqiang
- Nickname: 龙之队 (Team Dragon)

Olympic Games
- Appearances: 11

FIBA World Cup
- Appearances: 10

FIBA Asia Cup
- Appearances: 24
- Medals: (gold) Gold: (1975, 1977, 1979, 1981, 1983, 1987, 1989, 1991, 1993, 1995, 1999, 2001, 2003, 2005, 2011, 2015); (silver) Silver: (2009, 2025); (bronze) Bronze: (1985, 1997)

Asian Games
- Appearances: 14
- Medals: (gold) Gold: (1978, 1986, 1990, 1994, 1998, 2006, 2010, 2018); (silver) Silver: (1982, 2002); (bronze) Bronze: (1974, 2022)
Home	Away

First international
- As Republic of China (1912–1949); Philippines 26–8 China (Manila, Philippines; 7 February 1913); As People's Republic of China (1949–present); South Korea 93–101 China (Tehran, Iran; 2 September 1974)

Biggest win
- Indonesia 31–138 China (Kuala Lumpur, Malaysia; 29 December 1985)

Biggest defeat
- FR Yugoslavia 128–61 China (Atlanta, United States; 30 July 1996)
Medal record
FIBA Asia Cup
Gold medal – first place	1975 Bangkok
Gold medal – first place	1977 Kuala Lumpur
Gold medal – first place	1979 Nagoya
Gold medal – first place	1981 Calcutta
Gold medal – first place	1983 Hong Kong
Gold medal – first place	1987 Bangkok
Gold medal – first place	1989 Beijing
Gold medal – first place	1991 Kobe
Gold medal – first place	1993 Jakarta
Gold medal – first place	1995 Seoul
Gold medal – first place	1999 Fukuoka
Gold medal – first place	2001 Shanghai
Gold medal – first place	2003 Harbin
Gold medal – first place	2005 Doha
Gold medal – first place	2011 Wuhan
Gold medal – first place	2015 Changsha
Silver medal – second place	2009 Tianjin
Silver medal – second place	2025 Jeddah
Bronze medal – third place	1985 Kuala Lumpur
Bronze medal – third place	1997 Riyadh
Asian Games
Gold medal – first place	1978 Bangkok	Team
Gold medal – first place	1986 Seoul	Team
Gold medal – first place	1990 Beijing	Team
Gold medal – first place	1994 Hiroshima	Team
Gold medal – first place	1998 Bangkok	Team
Gold medal – first place	2006 Doha	Team
Gold medal – first place	2010 Guangzhou	Team
Gold medal – first place	2018 Jakarta-Palembang	Team
Silver medal – second place	1982 Delhi	Team
Silver medal – second place	2002 Busan	Team
Bronze medal – third place	1974 Tehran	Team
Bronze medal – third place	2022 Hangzhou	Team
Far Eastern Championship Games
Gold medal – first place	1921 Shanghai
Silver medal – second place	1913 Manila
Silver medal – second place	1915 Shanghai
Silver medal – second place	1917 Tokyo
Silver medal – second place	1919 Manila
Silver medal – second place	1923 Osaka
Silver medal – second place	1925 Manila
Silver medal – second place	1927 Shanghai
Silver medal – second place	1930 Tokyo
Silver medal – second place	1934 Manila
East Asian Games
Gold medal – first place	1993 Shanghai
Gold medal – first place	2001 Osaka
Silver medal – second place	2013 Tianjin
Bronze medal – third place	1997 Busan
Bronze medal – third place	2005 Macau

The China men's national basketball team (simplified Chinese: 中国国家男子篮球队; traditional Chinese: 中國國家男子籃球隊; pinyin: Zhōngguó Guójiā Nánzǐ Lánqiú Duì), nicknamed Team Dragon, represents the People's Republic of China in international basketball. The national team is governed by the Chinese Basketball Association (CBA).

China has won the most titles at the FIBA Asia Cup, and the Asian Games. They have also made 10 appearances at the FIBA World Cup, and 11 at the Olympic Games.

== History ==
=== Republic of China era (1913–1949) ===
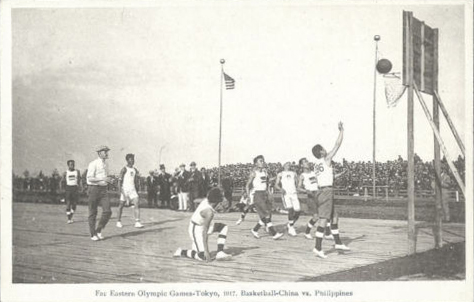
The match where China played against Philippines in 1917 Far Eastern Championship Games;in Tokyo, Japan

In 1913, China participated in the basketball tournament at the 1913 Far Eastern Championship Games in Manila, Philippines. At the time, China had not yet established a nationwide selection system for basketball players, and the team was composed primarily of national football team and track athletes who received little to no training in basketball. China lost its opening game to the host Philippines 18–56.

Basketball became an official event at the 2nd National Games of China in 1914. In 1917, China's first dedicated men's basketball team was established, and it participated in the Far Eastern Championship Games held that year. In 1936, the China National Amateur Athletic Federation joined FIBA, and China made its debut in the men's Olympic basketball tournament, recording one win and three losses. China returned to the Olympics in 1948, recording five wins and three losses and finishing 18th overall.

By 1949, the China men's national basketball team had played 41 games in international competitions, including the Far Eastern Championship Games and the Olympics, recording 17 wins and 24 losses. At the Far Eastern Championship Games, China won one gold, nine silver, and one bronze medal. China defeated the Philippines and Japan to win the championship in 1921, but remained generally behind the Philippines for most of this period.

=== Early People's Republic of China (1949–1974) ===
In August 1949, a men's basketball team composed of university students from the communist-controlled zone participated in the 2nd World Festival of Youth and Students in Budapest, Hungary, finishing sixth. In the early 1950s, following the establishment of the People's Republic of China, the China men's national basketball team was re-established on the foundations of the basketball tradition developed during the Republican period in mainland China. A national team, provincial teams, military teams, and a nationwide competition and training system were gradually established. The visit of the Soviet Union men's national basketball team to China in 1950 had a significant influence on the development of Chinese basketball.

On 7 May 1952, FIBA recognized the All-China Sports Federation, based in the People's Republic of China, as the organization representing Chinese basketball. The China men's national team was formed to participate in the Helsinki Olympics, but arrived too late to take part in the tournament. In 1953, the team participated in the inaugural World Festival of Youth and Students in Bucharest, Romania, finishing fifth. Chinese basketball subsequently developed a nationwide league and a professional training system, and its competitive level gradually improved. By the late 1950s, the China men's national team had begun defeating European teams such as Hungary, Czechoslovakia, and Bulgaria in international matches, while a first generation of core players led by Qian Chenghai and Yang Boyong emerged.

In 1958, the Chinese Basketball Association unilaterally withdrew from FIBA after FIBA refused to terminate the membership of the counterpart in Taiwan. The team subsequently remained absent from FIBA-organized competitions for an extended period. It nevertheless continued to play international matches against foreign teams, including in competitions organized by socialist countries and Third World countries. In 1963, China participated in the 1st Games of the New Emerging Forces and won the men's basketball tournament undefeated; it successfully defended its title at the second edition in 1966. These achievements marked important milestones in the development of the team's competitive level and basketball system during this period.

=== Return to FIBA and Asian Dominance (1974–1994) ===
The team holding the trophy after winning 1975 ABC Championship

During the 1970s, as the international position of the People's Republic of China improved, the China men's national basketball team returned to international competition. The 1974 Asian Games, held in Tehran, marked the team's first major international appearance following its return, and China won the bronze medal. In 1975, China made its debut at the Asian Basketball Championship, winning the tournament with a perfect record of nine victories under head coach Qian Chenghai.

China soon established itself as the dominant force in Asian basketball. The team won five consecutive Asian Championship titles between 1975 and 1983, finishing first at each tournament and maintaining an unbeaten record throughout the run. At the 1977 championship in Kuala Lumpur, China defeated Japan 110–81 en route to its second consecutive title. At the 1979 tournament in Nagoya, China narrowly defeated host nation Japan 70–68 and also beat South Korea 94–88, securing its third consecutive championship. China retained the title in 1981, finishing ahead of South Korea and Japan in the final standings. At the 1983 championship in Hong Kong, China defeated South Korea 92–63 and Japan 95–71 in the final phase, completing its first five-title winning streak.

The competitive landscape of Asian basketball during this period was marked by a significant gap between China and most of its regional opponents. South Korea was China's most consistent challenger, while the Philippines, another traditional power in Asian basketball, remained a significant competitor. Japan also regularly featured among the leading teams, although China generally held a substantial advantage in their encounters. China's dominance was reflected in the margins of many of its victories, including its 110–81 win over Japan in 1977 and its 92–63 victory over South Korea in 1983.

At the 1985–86 Asian Championship in Kuala Lumpur, held from 28 December 1985 to 5 January 1986, China's winning streak came to an end. After opening the tournament with a 138–31 victory over Indonesia, China lost 65–74 to South Korea and 72–82 to the Philippines in the final round, finishing third. The defeat ended China's 41-game winning streak at the Asian Championship, and marked the first time the team had failed to win the title since its debut in 1975. The Philippines won the tournament, with South Korea finishing second.

China regained the title at the 1987 championship in Bangkok, defeating South Korea 86–79 in the final. The tournament also featured the first meeting between the men's national teams of mainland China and Chinese Taipei at the Asian Championship, with China winning 85–73. China subsequently won the 1989 championship in Beijing, defeating South Korea 102–72 in the final. At the 1991 tournament in Kobe, China again won the title, extending its run of victories over its regional rivals. The team secured its fourth consecutive championship since 1987 at the 1993 tournament in Jakarta, finishing ahead of North Korea and South Korea.

China also enjoyed considerable success in the Asian Games. The team won its first men's basketball gold medal at the 1978 Asian Games in Bangkok, finished as runner-up at the 1982 Asian Games in New Delhi, and subsequently won three consecutive gold medals at the 1986 Asian Games in Seoul, the 1990 Asian Games in Beijing, and the 1994 Asian Games in Hiroshima. These results further established China as one of the leading national teams in the continent.

Meanwhile, the national team continued to gain experience in international competitions, participating in the FIBA World Championship in 1978, 1982, 1986, 1990 and 1994. At the 1994 FIBA World Championship in Canada, China finished eighth, its best result in the competition at the time.

By 1994, China had established itself as one of the most successful and consistently dominant national teams in Asian basketball. Between 1975 and 1993, the team won nine Asian Championship titles in ten appearances, in addition to four Asian Games gold medals during the period from 1978 to 1994.

During this period, the national team did not rely excessively on tall centers such as Mu Tiezhu or win games solely through its height advantage, as the common stereotype suggests. In fact, the team's offense combined its strength in the paint with perimeter skills. In the game against South Korea at the 1981 Asian Basketball Championship, China scored 56 points from inside and 40 from outside; in the 1983 championship final against Japan, mid-range shooting, fast breaks and scoring near the basket all played important roles. Furthermore, Zhang Weiping, who stood 1.93 m (6 ft 4 in) tall, averaged 25.3 points per game at the 1978 FIBA World Championship, ranking second among all players in scoring. His performance also demonstrated the individual technical ability of Chinese players at the time. China's dominance in Asian basketball was therefore not based solely on height, but on a combination of interior strength, perimeter offense and coordinated team play.

=== Establishment on the World Stage (1994–2004) ===
The 1990s marked a new period of success for China men's national basketball team. At the 1994 FIBA World Championship, China was drawn into a tough group alongside the United States, Brazil and Spain. In their opening game, China defeated reigning FIBA Americas champions Brazil 97–93 in overtime. In their final group game, China came back from an 18-point deficit to defeat Spain 78–76. With a 2–1 record, China advanced to the quarter-finals as the group's second-placed team. At the 1996 Summer Olympics in Atlanta, China again finished eighth. Players such as Hu Weidong, Gong Xiaobin, Sun Jun, Liu Yudong and Li Nan became known as China's "Golden Generation". In 1994, the Chinese Basketball Association (CBA) was established, marking the beginning of the professional era of Chinese basketball. These players also became prominent figures in the league's early years.

From the late 1990s onwards, as a new generation of elite centers emerged, interior play gradually became China's most significant roster strength, and the team's tactical emphasis shifted increasingly towards the paint. This development also reflected the contemporary emphasis on centers and interior offense in the NBA, rather than being a trend unique to Chinese basketball. At the 2000 Summer Olympics in Sydney, 20-year-old Yao Ming made his debut for the national team. He subsequently joined Wang Zhizhi and Mengke Bateer to form the core of China's frontcourt, with the trio becoming known as the "Three Great Centers" and the "Walking Great Wall". In 2002, Yao became the first Chinese player to be selected first overall in the NBA draft, after which Chinese players increasingly made their way into the NBA.

China's results fluctuated during this period, including losses to South Korea at the 1997 Asian Championship and the 2002 Asian Games. Under Li Yuanwei's leadership of the Chinese Basketball Association, the national team began appointing foreign head coaches and underwent further changes in preparation for the 2008 Beijing Olympics.

=== Peak (2004–2018) ===
Under head coaches Del Harris and Jonas Kazlauskas, the China men's national basketball team placed greater emphasis on team-oriented offense and defense, while its tactical style became increasingly influenced by European basketball. At the same time, Yao Ming developed into a world-class center, allowing China to re-establish its position as the leading team in Asia while achieving further breakthroughs in international competition.

At the 2004 Athens Olympics, China defeated Serbia and Montenegro 67–66 in the final group-stage game to advance to the quarterfinals. At the 2006 FIBA World Championship, China reached the round of 16 before losing to Greece. At the 2008 Beijing Olympics, China defeated Germany and held an early lead over Spain before ultimately advancing to the quarterfinals and finishing eighth for the second consecutive Olympics.

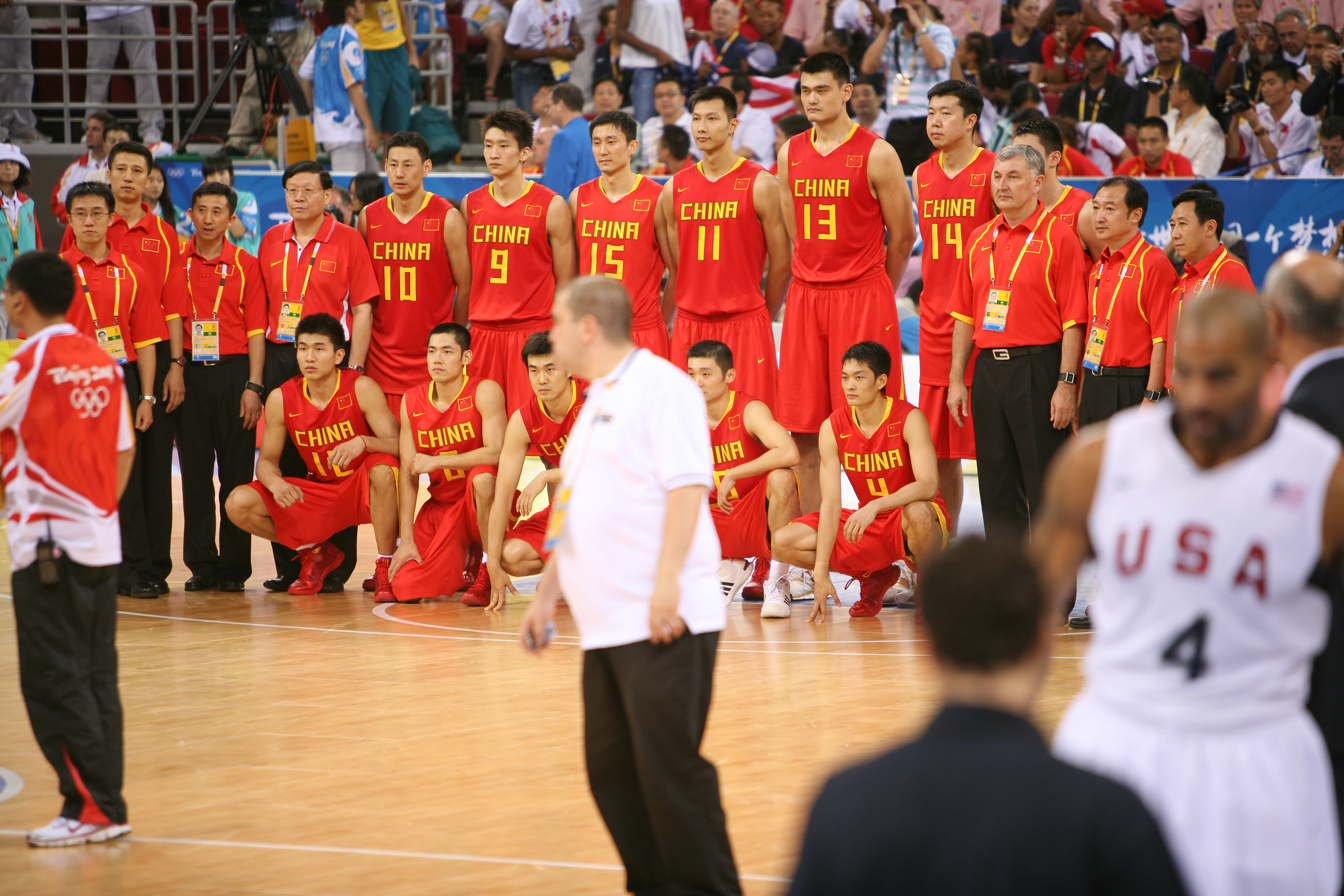
Team China in 2008 Olympics.

After the 2008 Olympics, Yao Ming withdrew from the national team because of injuries, and China entered a period of transition between generations. At the 2009 FIBA Asia Championship, China suffered a home defeat to Iran, challenging its long-standing dominance of Asian basketball. At the 2010 FIBA World Championship, China reached the round of 16. At the 2010 Asian Games, China won the gold medal despite the absence of Yao Ming and Yi Jianlian. At the 2011 FIBA Asia Championship in Wuhan, China won the championship again.

At the 2012 London Olympics, China lost all five of its games. At the 2013 FIBA Asia Championship, China lost to South Korea and Iran before suffering a 78–96 quarterfinal defeat to the Chinese Taipei team. China finished fifth and failed to qualify for the 2014 FIBA Basketball World Cup, recording its worst finish at the Asian Championship since 1975.

At the 2015 FIBA Asia Championship, China won the title undefeated on home soil, reclaiming the Asian championship after a four-year absence.

In 2017, China implemented a system of two national training teams, known as the "Red Team" and "Blue Team", coached by Li Nan and Du Feng, respectively. In 2018, the Red Team participated in preseason games against NBA Summer League teams, recording one win and four losses and won the 2018 Asian Games gold medal, being undefeated.

=== Stagnation (2018–present) ===
In September 2018, the two teams were formally merged, with Li Nan appointed as head coach. At the 2019 FIBA Basketball World Cup, China defeated Ivory Coast in the group stage before losing to Poland and Venezuela, failing to advance to the second round. In the classification round, China defeated South Korea but lost to Nigeria, finishing behind Iran and becoming the first Asian team to lose its direct qualification spot for the Olympics. At the 2020 Summer Olympics qualifying tournament in 2021, China lost to Canada and Greece and failed to qualify for the Olympics. This marked the first time since 1984 that China had failed to qualify for the Olympics.

At the 2023 FIBA Basketball World Cup, China went 1–2 in the group stage and subsequently lost to the Philippines in the classification round, finishing 29th overall and failing to qualify for the 2024 Paris Olympics. The sole direct qualification place for an Asian team was instead awarded to Japan.

At the 2025 FIBA Asia Cup, China went undefeated in the group stage and subsequently defeated South Korea and New Zealand in the knockout stage to reach the final for the first time in ten years. China ultimately lost 89–90 to defending champions Australia, finishing as runners-up, becoming the second Asian team after Lebanon that came close to defeating Australia since its entry into FIBA Asia.

The following year, China participated at the 2026 Asian Games, where they made it all the way to the bronze game before falling to Iran 79–70.

== "Second team" ==
Prior to the mid-2010s, China traditionally fielded so-called "Second teams/B teams" (Chinese: 国家二队) or "Olympic teams" . They generally consisted of younger players and reserves, and represented China in the competitions which were deemed less important or prestigious, such as East Asian Games, East Asia Basketball Championship, FIBA Asia Challenge and pre-2017 FIBA Asia Cup.

Examples include, none of the players who represented China at the 2007 FIBA Asia Championship, which China deemed as unimportant as it already qualified for 2008 Olympic Games as the host, were subsequently selected for the national team's final rosters for the 2008 Summer Olympics or the 2009 FIBA Asia Championship.

Also in 2012, China assembling a "national Olympic team", primarily composed of young players, to develop prospects for the 2016 Summer Olympics. It competed in the 2012 FIBA Asia Cup and subsequently represented China at regional competitions, including the 2013 East Asian Basketball Championship and the 2013 East Asian Games, as well as the 2014 FIBA Asia Cup. However, most players who represented China in these competitions were not subsequently selected for the national team rosters at 2015 FIBA Asia Championship and 2016 Summer Olympics, which China deemed as major tournaments.

By the 2020s, the traditional second-team model had largely fallen out of use. Several competitions in which China had frequently fielded its second team had been discontinued: the East Asian Games ended after its 2013 edition, the East Asian Championship was last held in 2017, and the FIBA Asia Challenge concluded after its 2016 edition. These developments, together with changes to FIBA's international competition calendar, essentially eliminated the opportunities and need for China to field a separate developmental team in less important tournaments.

== Team image ==
=== Manufacturer ===
2010–present: Nike

=== Sponsor ===
2010: China Mobile, UPS
2011, 2013–15: TCL

=== Rivals ===
==== South Korea ====
South Korea has been one of the China men's national basketball team's most prominent long-standing rivals since China returned to international basketball competition in 1974. The two teams have regularly competed for supremacy in Asian basketball at the Asian Basketball Championship and the Asian Games. During the period from the 1970s to the early 21st century, when China established itself as the dominant force in Asian basketball, South Korea was among the few teams capable of consistently challenging China for continental honors. The rivalry was particularly evident in the Asian Championship, where the two teams met repeatedly in the latter stages of the tournament, including six finals between 1987 and 2003, all of which were won by China.

Despite China's overall historical advantage, South Korea remained capable of posing a serious challenge in important games. FIBA has described China–Korea matchups as among the most historically significant in Asian basketball, noting the two teams' combined record of continental titles and Korea's decades of consistent contention. Although China has generally held the upper hand in their rivalry, South Korea's sustained competitiveness has made it one of the defining opponents in China's history of Asian basketball.

China and South Korea are both traditional powers in Asian basketball, and their national teams share certain similarities in their roster-building approaches. Although both countries have fielded naturalized players, their national teams have historically relied primarily on domestically developed players, with their competitiveness rooted largely in domestic player development and professional basketball systems rather than the recruitment of naturalized players as a principal means of achieving short-term improvements in performance. At the 2025 FIBA Asia Cup, neither team included a naturalized player on its final roster, with both squads composed primarily of domestically developed players. The two teams have traditionally been associated with contrasting playing styles: China has generally relied on its size and interior presence, while South Korea has been known for its perimeter shooting. FIBA's preview of the 2025 Asia Cup also highlighted these differences in the teams' respective strengths. Their continued reliance on domestically developed players and established basketball systems distinguishes both teams among Asia's traditional national basketball powers, particularly amid the growing influence of naturalized players in the region.

The rivalry between China and South Korea at the Asian Games also has some distinctive characteristics. Both countries have long regarded the Asian Games as an important multi-sport international event, with China's sports system placing particular emphasis on the Games, while South Korea's military service system further increases their importance for Korean athletes. Under South Korea's current system, male athletes who win an Asian Games gold medal are eligible for exemption from conscription, making the Asian Games particularly significant for elite Korean athletes who have yet to complete their service. As a result, compared with other Asian teams, China and South Korea have generally been more inclined to field strong squads in men's basketball at the Asian Games, making the competition an especially important stage in the history of their rivalry.

Since their first meeting at the 1948 Summer Olympics in London, the two teams have played 42 games as of September 2026, with China holding a 30–12 record. (Note: If only FIBA-recognized competitions are counted, the two teams have played 29 games, with China holding a 20–9 record.Furthermore, this figure does not include matches in competitions such as the FIBA Asia Challenge, the East Asian Games and the East Asia Basketball Championship, in which China traditionally attached little to no importance to.)

==== Philippines ====
The basketball rivalry between China and the Philippines is one of the earliest and longest-standing national-team rivalries in international basketball history, and has also been referred to as the "Islander–Dragon rivalry" The two teams first met at the Far Eastern Championship Games in 1913, well before the establishment of FIBA. From 1913 to 1934, the Philippines held a long-standing advantage and was one of the dominant teams in Asian basketball during this period. As Chinese basketball gradually developed, the balance of power between the two teams shifted. From the 1970s to the early 21st century, China was generally the leading force in Asian basketball, and its meetings with the Philippines increasingly favored China. Since the 2010s, the gap between the two teams has narrowed as Philippine basketball has grown more competitive and naturalized players have assumed a greater role on the national team. The two teams have repeatedly faced one another in the Asia Cup, the Asian Games, and World Cup qualifying, making the China–Philippines matchup an important rivalry in Asian basketball once again.

Since their first meeting at the Far Eastern Championship Games in 1913, the two teams have played 48 games as of September 2026, with China holding a 24–24 record. (Note: If only FIBA-recognized games are counted, China holds a 10–6 record.Furthermore, this figure does not include matches in competitions such as the FIBA Asia Challenge, the East Asian Games and the East Asia Basketball Championship, in which China traditionally attached little to no importance to.)

As of 2026, the Philippines is the only FIBA Asia team to have a winning percentage of 50% or higher against China.

==== Iran ====
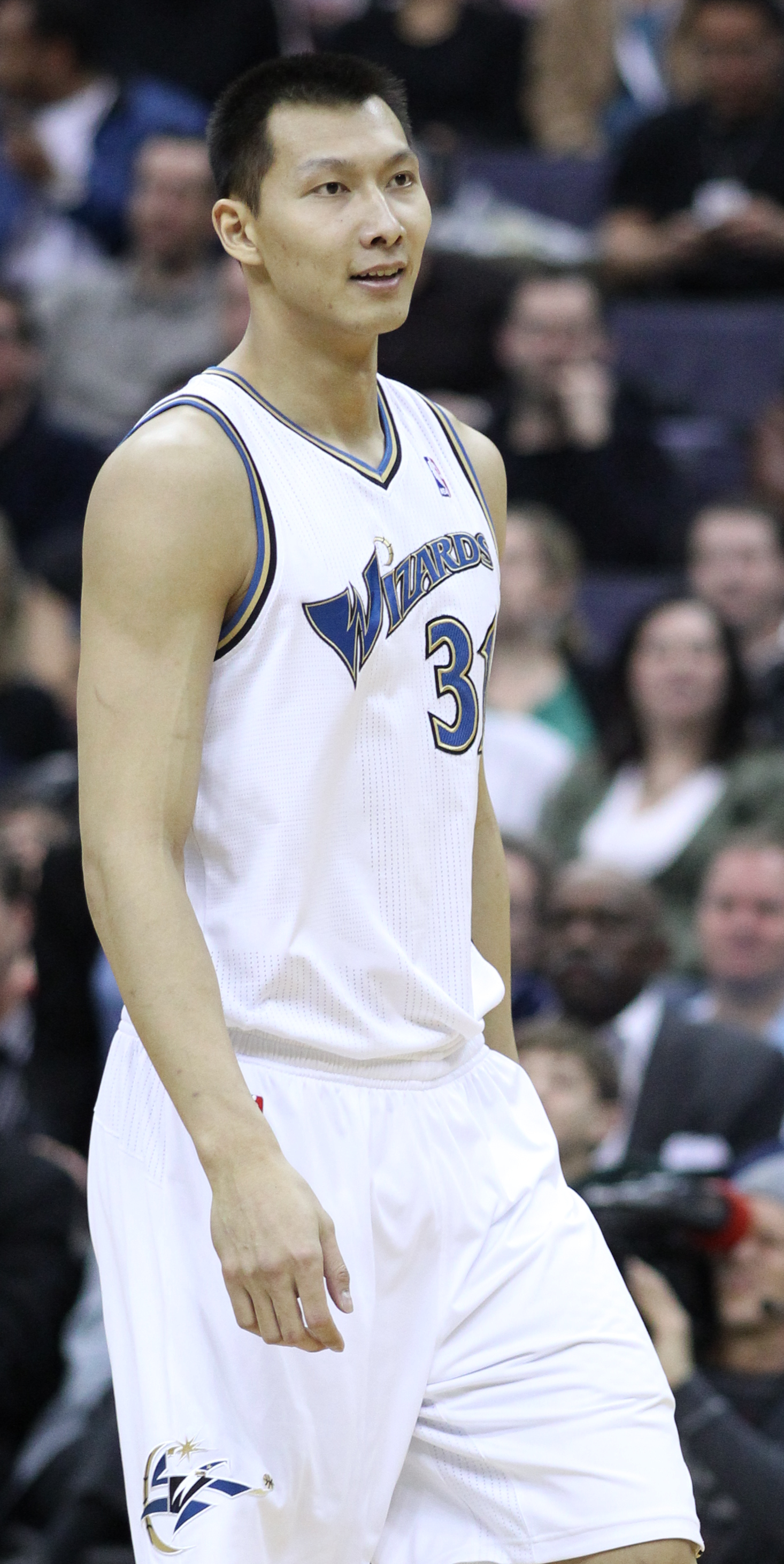
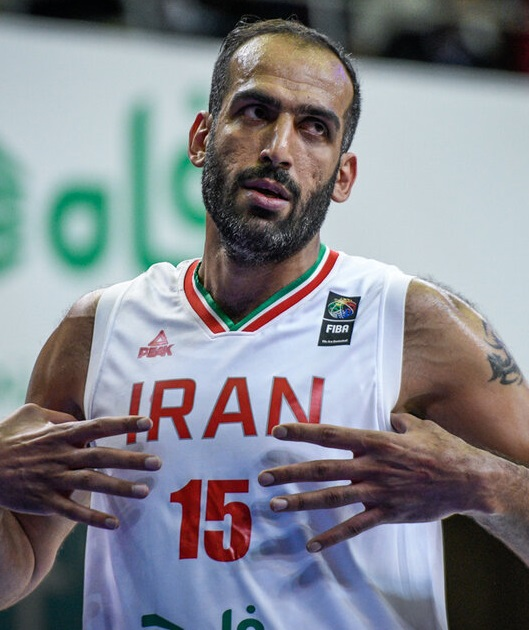
Yi (left) and Haddadi (right)'s long-running matchup was a defining individual rivalry in China–Iran basketball, attracting considerable media attention in both international competitions and the CBA.

Iran has been one of the most important Asian rivals of the China men's national basketball team since the beginning of the 21st century. Iran's rise during this period was largely driven by what Iranian media called, a "golden generation"(Persian: نسل طلایی بسکتبال ایران; nasl-e talāyi), centered around Hamed Haddadi, Samad Nikkhah Bahrami, and Mehdi Kamrani. These players had already demonstrated strong potential at the youth level. At the Asian U18 Championship in 2002, Iran defeated China in the semifinals and South Korea in the final to win the title, with Haddadi and other members of the generation beginning to emerge as promising young players.

Particularly during the period from 2007 to 2017, the two teams remained at the highest competitive level of Asian men's basketball and repeatedly competed directly for the Asian championship. FIBA noted that China and Iran were the two most dominant teams in Asian basketball during the approximately 15 years preceding the 2015 FIBA Asia Championship, with the two teams collectively winning all eight championships during that period, China five times and Iran three times. Iran won its first Asian championship in 2007, followed by further titles in 2009 and 2013, while China won the championship in 2011 and 2015. In the final of the 2009 Asian Basketball Championship in Tianjin, Iran defeated China 70–52 to win its second consecutive title. In the semifinals of the 2015 FIBA Asia Championship in Changsha, China defeated Iran and went on to win the championship, marking China's return to the top of Asian basketball.

The China–Iran rivalry during this period was also embodied by the long-running matchup between Yi Jianlian and Hamed Haddadi, two of Asia's NBA-level leading interior players. As the respective core players of China and Iran, they faced one another multiple times at the Asia Cup and each won the tournament's Most Valuable Player award. Haddadi led Iran to the Asian championships in 2007, 2009, and 2013, while Yi led China to the titles in 2011 and 2015. Their long-running matchup became one of the defining individual duels of 21st-century Asian basketball.

Since their first meeting at the 1974 Asian Games in Tehran, the two teams have played 20 games as of September 2026, with China holding a 15–5 record (Note: If only FIBA-recognized competitions, including the FIBA Asia Cup/Asian Basketball Championship and World Cup qualifiers, are counted, the two teams have played 15 games, with China holding a 10–3 record.Furthermore, this figure does not include matches in competitions such as the FIBA Asia Challenge, the East Asian Games and the East Asia Basketball Championship, in which China traditionally attached little to no importance to.).

==== Japan ====
Japan is one of the longest-standing traditional opponents of the China men's national basketball team in East Asia. The two teams have faced one another regularly in Asian and international competitions since the Far Eastern Championship Games in 1917. However, compared with South Korea, Japan's overall competitiveness was relatively limited during most of the late 20th and early 21st centuries, and it was less frequently involved in sustained competition for the Asian championship. Since the 2020s, Japan's international competitiveness has increased significantly alongside the development of Japanese basketball, the addition of naturalized players, and the growth of the B.League. Japan has consequently emerged as an important East Asian rival for China. In the 2025 Asia Cup qualifiers, Japan defeated China 76–73, defeating China in a senior international competition for the first time in 88 years.

Since their first meeting at the Far Eastern Championship Games in 1917, the two teams have played 41 games as of September 2026, with China holding a 36–5 record. (Note: The Far Eastern Championship Games and the Asian Games are not recognized by FIBA as official competitions. If only FIBA-recognized games are counted, China holds a 20–3 record.Furthermore, this figure does not include matches in competitions such as the FIBA Asia Challenge, the East Asian Games and the East Asia Basketball Championship, in which China traditionally attached little to no importance to.)

== Competitive record ==
=== Olympic Games ===
Summer Olympics
Year	Rank	Pld	W	L
(Germany) 1936	15th–18th place	4	1	3
(United Kingdom) 1948	18th place	8	5	3
(Finland) 1952	Did not participate			
(Australia) 1956	Did not participate			
(Italy) 1960	Did not participate			
(Japan) 1964	Did not participate			
(Mexico) 1968	Did not participate			
(Germany) 1972	Did not participate			
(Canada) 1976	Did not participate			
(Soviet Union) 1980	Did not participate			
(United States) 1984	10th place	7	2	5
(South Korea) 1988	11th place	7	2	5
(Spain) 1992	12th place	7	0	7
(United States) 1996	8th place	8	2	6
(Australia) 2000	10th place	6	2	4
(Greece) 2004	8th place	7	2	5
(China) 2008	8th place	6	2	4
(United Kingdom) 2012	12th place	5	0	5
(Brazil) 2016	12th place	5	0	5
(Japan) 2020	Did not qualify			
(France) 2024	Did not qualify			
Total	11/21	70	18	52

=== FIBA World Cup ===
FIBA World Cup record
Year	Position	Pld	W	L
(Argentina) 1950	Not a FIBA member			
(Brazil) 1954	Not a FIBA member			
(Chile) 1959	Not a FIBA member			
(Brazil) 1963	Not a FIBA member			
(Uruguay) 1967	Not a FIBA member			
(Socialist Federal Republic of Yugoslavia) 1970	Not a FIBA member			
(Puerto Rico) 1974	Not a FIBA member			
(Philippines) 1978	11th place	7	2	5
(Colombia) 1982	12th place	7	1	6
(Spain) 1986	9th place	10	4	6
(Argentina) 1990	14th place	8	2	6
(Canada) 1994	8th place	8	2	6
(Greece) 1998	Did not qualify			
(United States) 2002	12th place	8	1	7
(Japan) 2006	9th place	6	2	4
(Turkey) 2010	16th place	5	1	4
(Spain) 2014	Did not qualify			
(China) 2019	24th place	5	2	3
(Philippines) (Japan) (Indonesia) 2023	29th place	5	1	4
(Qatar) 2027	To be determined			
(France) 2031	To be determined			
Total	10/12	69	18	51

=== FIBA Asia Cup ===
FIBA Asia Cup record
Year	Position	Pld	W	L
(Philippines) 1960	Not a FIBA Asia member			
(Taiwan) 1963	Not a FIBA Asia member			
(Malaysia) 1965	Not a FIBA Asia member			
(South Korea) 1967	Not a FIBA Asia member			
(Thailand) 1969	Not a FIBA Asia member			
(Japan) 1971	Not a FIBA Asia member			
(Philippines) 1973	Not a FIBA Asia member			
(Thailand) 1975	Champions	9	9	0
(Malaysia) 1977	Champions	9	9	0
(Japan) 1979	Champions	7	7	0
(India) 1981	Champions	7	7	0
(Hong Kong) 1983	Champions	7	7	0
(Malaysia) 1985	3rd place	5	3	2
(Thailand) 1987	Champions	8	8	0
(China) 1989	Champions	8	8	0
(Japan) 1991	Champions	9	9	0
(Indonesia) 1993	Champions	7	6	1
(South Korea) 1995	Champions	9	9	0
(Saudi Arabia) 1997	3rd place	8	7	1
(Japan) 1999	Champions	7	7	0
(China) 2001	Champions	8	8	0
(China) 2003	Champions	8	8	0
(Qatar) 2005	Champions	8	8	0
(Japan) 2007	10th place	7	3	4
(China) 2009	Runners-up	9	8	1
(China) 2011	Champions	9	9	0
(Philippines) 2013	5th place	9	6	3
(China) 2015	Champions	9	9	0
(Lebanon) 2017	5th place	7	5	2
(Indonesia) 2022	8th place	5	3	2
(Saudi Arabia) 2025	Runners-up	6	5	1
Total	24/24	185	168	17

=== Asian Games ===
Asian Games
Year	Position	Pld	W	L
(India) 1951	Did not enter			
(Philippines) 1954	Did not enter			
(Japan) 1958	Did not enter			
(Indonesia) 1962	Did not enter			
(Thailand) 1966	Did not enter			
(Thailand) 1970	Did not enter			
(Iran) 1974	3rd place	7	5	2
(Thailand) 1978	Champions	7	7	0
(India) 1982	Runners-up	9	8	1
(South Korea) 1986	Champions	7	7	0
(China) 1990	Champions	7	7	0
(Japan) 1994	Champions	5	5	0
(Thailand) 1998	Champions	7	7	0
(South Korea) 2002	Runners-up	7	6	1
(Qatar) 2006	Champions	8	8	0
(China) 2010	Champions	8	8	0
(South Korea) 2014	5th place	7	5	2
(Indonesia) 2018	Champions	5	5	0
(China) 2022	3rd place	6	5	1
(Japan) 2026	4th place	6	4	2
Total	14/20	96	87	9

=== FIBA Asia Challenge ===
FIBA Asia Challenge
Year	Position	Pld	W	L
(Japan) 2012	5th place	7	5	2
(China) 2014	4th place	7	4	3
(Iran) 2016	5th place	8	6	2
Total	3/6	22	15	7

=== EAB Championship ===
East Asian Basketball Championship
Year	Position	Pld	W	L
(China) 2005	Runners-up	5	3	2
(Japan) 2009	3rd place	4	2	2
(China) 2011	3rd place	4	3	1
(South Korea) 2013	Runners-up	4	3	1
(Japan) 2017	4th place	4	2	2
Total	5/5	21	13	8

=== East Asian Games ===
East Asian Games
Year	Position	Pld	W	L
(China) 1993	Champions			
(South Korea) 1997	3rd place			
(Japan) 2001	Champions			
(Macau) 2005	3rd place			
(Hong Kong) 2009	4th place			
(China) 2013	Runners-up			
Total	6/6			

== Team ==
=== Current roster ===
Roster for the 2026 Asian Games.

China men's national basketball team – 2027 FIBA Basketball World Cup qualification (Asia) roster
Players
Coaches

Pos.	No.	Name	Age – Date of birth	Height	Club	Ctr.
SG	3	Hu Mingxuan	28 – 10 March 1998	1.93 m (6 ft 4 in)	Guangdong Southern Tigers	(China)
SG	5	Liao Sanning	25 – 29 January 2001	1.91 m (6 ft 3 in)	Beijing Royal Fighters	(China)
PG	9	Pang Zhenglin	27 – 24 April 1999	1.83 m (6 ft 0 in)	Jiangsu Dragons	(China)
PF	10	Wang Junjie	21 – 3 April 2005	2.06 m (6 ft 9 in)	UMass Minutemen	(United States)
C	11	Yu Jiahao	23 – 18 March 2003	2.23 m (7 ft 4 in)	Zhejiang Golden Bulls	(China)
PF	14	Li Hongquan	24 – 29 September 2001	1.98 m (6 ft 6 in)	Shanghai Sharks	(China)
PF	16	Jiao Baiqiao	25 – 2 September 2001	2.10 m (6 ft 11 in)	Guangdong Southern Tigers	(China)
F	17	Zhao Jiayi	27 – 6 January 1999	2.02 m (6 ft 8 in)	Qingdao Eagles	(China)
C	21	Hu Jinqiu	26 – 24 September 1999	2.10 m (6 ft 11 in)	Zhejiang Lions	(China)
SF	24	Cui Yongxi	23 – 28 May 2003	1.96 m (6 ft 5 in)	Guangdong Southern Tigers	(China)
SF	26	Zhu Junlong	29 – 13 July 1997	2.01 m (6 ft 7 in)	Zhejiang Lions	(China)
G	32	Li Yuezhou	19 – 9 April 2007	1.88 m (6 ft 2 in)	Zhejiang Golden Bulls	(China)

Head coach

- (China) Guo Shiqiang

Assistant coach(es)

- (China) Li Ang
- (Spain) Joaquín Ruiz Lorente
- (Spain) Ángel Sánchez-Cañete
- (China) Wang Han

Legend

- (C) Team captain
- Club – describes last
  club before the tournament
- Age – describes age
  on 7 July 2026

=== Past rosters ===
Historic rosters

1936 Summer Olympics: 15th among 21 teams

Shen Yi-Tung, Tsai Yen-Hung, Wang Hung-Pin, Wang Shi-Hsuan, Wang Yu-Tseng, Wong Nan-Chen, Liu Bao-Cheng, Liu Yun-Chang, Mou Tso-Yun, Li Shao-Tang, Yu Sai-Chang

1948 Summer Olympics: 18th among 23 teams

Edward Lee, Lee Tsun-Tung, Woo Cheng-Chang, Wee Tian-Siak, Pao Sung-Yuan, Chia Chung-Chang, Chua Bon-Hua, Kya Is-Kyun, Yu Sai-Chang, Jose Yee

1978 FIBA World Championship: 11th among 14 teams

Wang Zongxing, Chen Kai, Kuang Lubin, Xing Weining, Wang Deli, Huang Pinjie, Mu Tiezhu, Ji Zhaoguang, Zhang Weiping, Liu Jizeng, Zhang Mingwei, He Juhua (Coach: Qian Chenghai)

1982 FIBA World Championship: 12th among 13 teams

Wang Zongxing, Ji Zhaoguang, Xu Xiaoliang, Kuang Lubin, Sun Fengwu, Wang Libin, Huang Yunlong, Feng Wei, Li Qiuping, Li Yaguang, Han Pengshan, Lu Jinqing (Coach: Qian Chenghai)

1984 Summer Olympics: 10th among 12 teams

Kuang Lubin, Ji Zhaoguang, Wang Libin, Liu Jianli, Hu Zhangbao, Lu Jinqing, Sun Fengwu, Zhang Bin, Huang Yunlong, Guo Yonglin, Wang Haibo, Li Yaguang (Coach: Qian Chenghai)

1986 FIBA World Championship: 9th among 24 teams

Wang Libin, Zhang Yongjun, Li Yaguang, Wang Fei, Huang Yunlong, Xu Xiaoliang, Zhang Bin, Li Feng, Sun Fengwu, Sha Guoli, Song Tao, Gong Luming (Coach: Qian Chenghai)

1988 Summer Olympics: 11th among 12 teams

Li Yaguang, Wang Fei, Wang Libin, Zhang Yongjun, Xu Xiaoliang, Zhang Bin, Huang Yunlong, Sun Fengwu, Zhang Xuelei, Chen Chijef, Song Ligang, Gong Luming, Sha Guoli (Coach: Qian Chenghai)

1990 FIBA World Championship: 14th among 16 teams

Li Chunjiang, Wang Fei, Sun Fengwu, Zhang Yongjun, Zhang Bin, Shan Tao, Song Ligang, Ma Jian, Gong Xiaobin, Zhang Degui, Wang Zhidan, Gong Luming (Coach: Wang Zhangyou)

1992 Summer Olympics: 12th among 12 teams

Hu Weidong, Li Chunjiang, Zhang Yongjun, Sun Fengwu, Ma Jian, Shan Tao, Wang Zhidan, Wu Qinglong, Gong Xiaobin, Sun Jun, Song Ligang, Adiljan (Coach: Jiang Xingquan)

1994 FIBA World Championship: 8th among 16 teams

Hu Weidong, Sun Jun, Shan Tao, Gong Xiaobin, Liu Yudong, Zhang Jinsong, Liu Daqing, Adiljan, Zheng Wu, Ji Minshang, Wu Naiqun, Wu Qinglong (Coach: Jiang Xingquan)

1996 Summer Olympics: 8th among 12 teams

Mengke Bateer, Wang Zhizhi, Hu Weidong, Liu Yudong, Li Nan, Shan Tao, Sun Jun, Gong Xiaobin, Wu Qinglong, Li Xiaoyong, Zheng Wu, Wu Naiqun (Coach: Gong Luming)

2000 Summer Olympics: 10th among 12 teams

Yao Ming, Mengke Bateer, Wang Zhizhi, Hu Weidong, Sun Jun, Li Nan, Guo Shiqiang, Liu Yudong, Zheng Wu, Zhang Jinsong, Li Qun, Li Xiaoyong (Coach: Jiang Xingquan)

2002 FIBA World Championship: 12th among 16 teams

Yao Ming, Mengke Bateer, Liu Wei, Li Nan, Hu Weidong, Guo Shiqiang, Zhang Cheng, Chen Ke, Gong Xiaobin, Liu Yudong, Du Feng, Zhu Fangyu (Coach: Wang Fei)

2004 Summer Olympics: 8th among 12 teams

Yao Ming, Yi Jianlian, Liu Wei, Mengke Bateer, Li Nan, Guo Shiqiang, Du Feng, Chen Ke, Zhang Yunsong, Zhu Fangyu, Zhang Jinsong, Mo Ke (Coach: Del Harris)

2006 FIBA World Championship: 15th among 24 teams

Yao Ming, Wang Zhizhi, Yi Jianlian, Liu Wei, Du Feng, Wang Shipeng, Mo Ke, Zhang Songtao, Chen Jianghua, Zhang Qingpeng, Zhu Fangyu, Sun Yue (Coach: Jonas Kazlauskas)

2008 Summer Olympics: 8th among 12 teams

Yao Ming, Wang Zhizhi, Yi Jianlian, Liu Wei, Du Feng, Wang Shipeng, Wang Lei, Li Nan, Chen Jianghua, Zhang Qingpeng, Zhu Fangyu, Sun Yue (Coach: Jonas Kazlauskas)

2014 Asian Games: 5th among 16 teams

Chinese men's national basketball team – 2014 Asian Games roster
Players
Coaches

Pos.	No.	Name	Age – Date of birth	Height	Club
PG	4	Liu Xiaoyu	25 – 14 March 1989	1.90 m (6 ft 3 in)	Guangdong Southern Tigers	(China)
G	5	Guo Ailun	20 – 14 November 1993	1.92 m (6 ft 4 in)	Liaoning Flying Leopards	(China)
G/F	6	Gu Quan	22 – 2 April 1992	2.00 m (6 ft 7 in)	Dongguan Leopards	(China)
F/C	7	Zhou Qi	18 – 16 January 1996	2.17 m (7 ft 1 in)	Xinjiang Flying Tigers	(China)
G/F	8	Zhao Tailong	24 – 4 January 1990	1.97 m (6 ft 6 in)	Fujian Sturgeons	(China)
F	9	Zhai Xiaochuan	21 – 24 March 1993	2.04 m (6 ft 8 in)	Beijing Ducks	(China)
G/F	10	Ding Yanyuhang	21 – 20 August 1993	2.00 m (6 ft 7 in)	Shandong Golden Stars	(China)
SF	11	Zhou Peng (C)	24 – 11 October 1989	2.06 m (6 ft 9 in)	Guangdong Southern Tigers	(China)
G	12	Xirelijiang Mugedaer	23 – 4 January 1991	1.91 m (6 ft 3 in)	Xinjiang Flying Tigers	(China)
PF	13	Sun Tonglin	21 – 23 December 1992	2.06 m (6 ft 9 in)	Dongguan Leopards	(China)
F/C	14	Li Xiaoxu	24 – 5 June 1990	2.04 m (6 ft 8 in)	Liaoning Flying Leopards	(China)
C	15	Wang Zhelin	20 – 20 January 1994	2.14 m (7 ft 0 in)	Fujian Sturgeons	(China)

Head coach

- (China) Gong Luming

Assistant coach(es)

- (China) Li Nan
- (China) Hu Xuefeng
- (China) Zhang Bin
- (Greece) Giannis Christopoulos

Technical consultants

- (China) Jiang Xingquan
- (China) Yao Ming

Team manager

- (China) Hao Guohua

Legend

- (C) Team captain
- Club – describes last
  club before the tournament
- Age – describes age
  on 19 September 2014
- Source: incheon2014ag.org

2016 Summer Olympics: 12th among 12 teams

Chinese men's national basketball team – 2016 Rio Summer Olympics roster
Players
Coaches

Pos.	No.	Name	Age – Date of birth	Height	Club	Ctr.
PG	4	Zhao Jiwei	20 – 25 August 1995	1.85 m (6 ft 1 in)	Liaoning Flying Leopards	(China)
G	5	Sui Ran	23 – 25 June 1992	1.94 m (6 ft 4 in)	Shandong Golden Stars	(China)
PG	6	Guo Ailun	21 – 14 November 1993	1.92 m (6 ft 4 in)	Liaoning Flying Leopards	(China)
SF	8	Ding Yanyuhang	22 – 20 August 1993	2.00 m (6 ft 7 in)	Shandong Golden Stars	(China)
SF	9	Zhai Xiaochuan	22 – 24 March 1993	2.05 m (6 ft 9 in)	Beijing Ducks	(China)
G/F	10	Zhou Peng (C)	25 – 11 October 1989	2.06 m (6 ft 9 in)	Guangdong Southern Tigers	(China)
PF	11	Yi Jianlian	27 – 27 October 1987	2.13 m (7 ft 0 in)	Los Angeles Lakers	(United States)
G/F	12	Li Gen	27 – 15 August 1988	1.96 m (6 ft 5 in)	Xinjiang Flying Tigers	(China)
C	13	Li Muhao	23 – 2 June 1992	2.19 m (7 ft 2 in)	Shenzhen Leopards	(China)
F/C	14	Zou Yuchen	19 – 5 July 1996	2.08 m (6 ft 10 in)	Bayi Rockets	(China)
F/C	15	Zhou Qi	20 – 16 January 1996	2.17 m (7 ft 1 in)	Xinjiang Flying Tigers	(China)
C	31	Wang Zhelin	22 – 20 January 1994	2.14 m (7 ft 0 in)	Fujian Sturgeons	(China)

Head coach

- (China) Gong Luming

Assistant coach(es)

- (Greece) Yannis Christopoulos
- (China) Li Nan
- (China) Wu Qinglong
- (China) Hu Xuefeng
- (China) Cui Wanjun

Strength and conditioning coach

- (China) Wang Weixing

Team manager

- (China) Chai Wensheng

Legend

- (C) Team captain
- Club – describes last
  club before the tournament
- Age – describes age
  on 23 September 2015

2016 FIBA Asia Challenge: 5th among 12 teams

China men's national basketball team – 2016 FIBA Asia Challenge roster
Players
Coaches

Pos.	No.	Name	Age – Date of birth	Height	Club	Ctr.
SG	5	Cui Jinming	24 – July 11, 1992	1.93 m (6 ft 4 in)	Jilin Northeast Tigers	(China)
F	6	He Tianju	25 – December 28, 1990	2.06 m (6 ft 9 in)	Liaoning Flying Leopards	(China)
PG	7	Fang Shuo	26 – September 7, 1990	1.88 m (6 ft 2 in)	Beijing Ducks	(China)
SG	9	Yuan Shuai	22 – July 18, 1994	1.90 m (6 ft 3 in)	Shanxi Zhongyu Brave Dragons	(China)
SF	11	Liu Zhixuan	25 – January 7, 1991	1.93 m (6 ft 4 in)	Liaoning Flying Leopards	(China)
PF	14	Zou Yuchen	20 – July 5, 1996	2.08 m (6 ft 10 in)	Bayi Rockets	(China)
C	15	Fan Ziming	18 – April 29, 1998	2.11 m (6 ft 11 in)	Foshan Long-Lions	(China)
SF	20	Zhan Yanhao	18 – October 25, 1997	1.95 m (6 ft 5 in)	Zhejiang Guangsha Lions	(China)
C	21	Hu Jinqiu	18 – September 24, 1997	2.08 m (6 ft 10 in)	Zhejiang Guangsha Lions	(China)
PF	22	Tao Hanlin	25 – June 4, 1991	2.08 m (6 ft 10 in)	Shandong Golden Stars	(China)
G	23	Zhao Dapeng	26 – August 7, 1990	1.95 m (6 ft 5 in)	Zhejiang Guangsha Lions	(China)
PG	33	Wu Qian	22 – July 7, 1994	1.90 m (6 ft 3 in)	Zhejiang Golden Bulls	(China)

Head coach

- (China) Li Nan

Assistant coach(es)

- (China) Fan Bin

Legend

- (C) Team captain
- (NP) Naturalized Player
- Club – describes last
  club before the tournament
- Age – describes age
  on 9 September 2016

=== Head coach history ===
- (United States) Charles Siler – 1915, 1917
- (Republic of China (1912–1949)) Ma Yuehan (馬約翰) – 1919
- (Republic of China (1912–1949)) Wang Shih-ching (王石卿) – 1921
- (Republic of China (1912–1949)) (Republic of China (1912–1949)) Dong Shouyi (董守義) – 1923, 1925, 1927, 1930, 1934, 1936
- (Republic of China (1912–1949)) Song Junfu (宋君復) – 1948
- (China) Qian Chenghai (钱澄海) – 1974–1978
- (China) Ma Qingsheng (马清盛) – 1978–1981
- (China) Qian Chenghai (钱澄海) – 1981–1982
- (China) Liu Guiyi (刘贵乙) – 1982–1982
- (China) Qian Chenghai (钱澄海) – 1982–1988
- (China) Sun Bang (孙邦) – 1989–1990
- (China) Wang Zhangyou (王长友) – 1990–1991
- (China) Jiang Xingquan (蒋兴权) – 1991–1995
- (China) Gong Luming (宫鲁鸣) – 1995–1996
- (China) Zhang Bin (张斌) – 1996–1997
- (China) Wang Fei (王非) – 1997–1999
- (China) Jiang Xingquan (蒋兴权) – 1999–2001
- (China) Wang Fei (王非) – 2001–2002
- (China) Jiang Xingquan (蒋兴权) – 2003–2003
- (United States) Del Harris – 2004–2004
- (Lithuania) Jonas Kazlauskas – 2005–2008
- (China) Guo Shiqiang (郭士强) – 2009–2010
- (United States) Bob Donewald Jr. – 2010–2012
- (Greece) Panagiotis Giannakis – 2013–2014
- (China) Gong Luming (宫鲁鸣) – 2014–2017
- (China) Du Feng (杜锋) – 2017–2018 (Blue Team)
- (China) Li Nan (李楠) – 2017–2019 (Red Team and the Combined Team)
- (China) Du Feng (杜锋) – 2019–2022
- (Serbia) Aleksandar Đorđević – 2022–2024
- (China) Guo Shiqiang (郭士强) – 2024–present

== See also ==
- China men's national under-19 basketball team
- China men's national under-17 basketball team
- China men's national 3x3 team
- China women's national basketball team
- Chinese Basketball Association
- Chinese Basketball Association (organisation)
- Chinese Taipei men's national basketball team
- National Basketball League
- Women's Chinese Basketball Association
- Sport in China
