= Mu Tiezhu =

Chinese basketball player and coach

Mu Tiezhu 穆铁柱
Personal information
- Born: June 1, 1949 Heze, Shandong, China
- Died: September 14, 2008 (aged 59) Beijing, China
- Listed height: 228 cm (7 ft 6 in)
- Listed weight: 160 kg (353 lb)

Career information
- Playing career: 1973–1987
- Position: Center

Career history
- 1973–1987: Bayi
Medals
Men's basketball
Representing China
FIBA Asia Cup
Gold medal – first place	1977 Kuala Lumpur
Gold medal – first place	1979 Nagoya
Gold medal – first place	1981 Kolkata
Gold medal – first place	1983 Hong Kong
Asian Games
Gold medal – first place	1978 Bangkok

Mu "Iron Pole" Tiezhu (simplified Chinese: 穆铁柱; traditional Chinese: 穆鐵柱; literally meaning "Mu Iron Pole"; June 1, 1949 – September 14, 2008) was a prominent Chinese basketball player and coach. At a height of 228 cm (7 feet 5.75 inches) and a weight of 160 kg, he was one of the largest and tallest players in China (Yao Ming and Sun Mingming both being similar or taller).

== Biography ==
Mu was born in Dongming County, Heze, Shandong in 1949.

Mu was one of the first Chinese giants who appeared in the China men's national basketball team. He played for the national basketball team for 14 years. As a member of Bayi Basketball Team, Mu still held the highest score of 81 points in a game, and played against the 1978 NBA champion Washington Bullets twice in August, 1979. Mu retired as a player in 1987, and as a coach in 2000.

He was often compared with Sun Mingming, because both of them have acromegaly, and could slam dunk without their feet leaving the ground.

Mu Tiezhu died of myocardial infarction on September 14, 2008, in Beijing. Two days after his death, The Draft Review named Mu as an "Honorable Draftee", saying he would have been a very high pick in the 1972 NBA draft had China been a more open society at the time.

== Honours ==
- FIBA Asia Championship: 1977, 1979, 1981, 1983
- Asian Games: 1978
- Asia Club Championship: 1981, 1984

== Filmography ==
Year	English title	Original title	Role	Notes
1988	One Night Pop Star	一夜歌星	Giant	
1988	The Silly Manager	傻冒经理	Big Darkie	
1990	Black Spot	黑色走廊	Giant kickboxer	
1991	Woman-Taxi-Woman	女人TAXI女人	Traffic policeman	

== Honors ==
- Asian Games, champion, 1978
- Asian Basketball Championships, champion, 1979, 1981, 1983
