= Park Chan-sook =

South Korean basketball player

- Hangul: 박찬숙
- Hanja: 朴贊淑
- RR: Bak Chansuk
- MR: Pak Ch'ansuk

Park Chan-sook
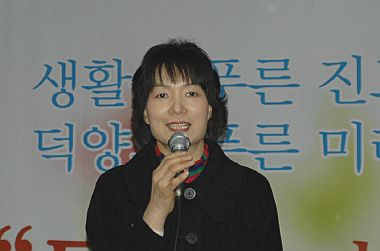
- Park Chan-sook in 2008

Medal record

Women's basketball

Representing South Korea

Olympic Games
Silver medal – second place	1984 Los Angeles	Team competition

FIBA World Championship
Silver medal – second place	1979 Seoul	Team competition

Asian Games
Gold medal – first place	1978 Bangkok	Team competition
Silver medal – second place	1982 New Delhi	Team competition

Park Chan-sook (born 3 June 1959 in Seoul, South Korea) is a South Korean former basketball player who competed in the 1984 Summer Olympics and in the 1988 Summer Olympics.

== Television appearances ==
- 2020: King of Mask Singer (MBC), contestant as "Six Million Dollar Man" (episode 259)
