= EABA Championship =

International basketball tournament

- Sport: Basketball
- Founded: 2009
- No. of teams: 6
- Country: EABA member nations
- Continent: FIBA Asia (Asia)
- Most recent champion: Chinese Taipei (1st title)
- Most titles: South Korea (3 titles)

The EABA Championship is an international basketball tournament which takes place every two years between national men's teams from East Asia. The tournament is also known as the East Asian Basketball Championship.

The East Asia Basketball Association, a subzone of the FIBA Asia organises the tournament . It serves as the East Asian qualifying tournament for the FIBA Asia Cup (formerly FIBA Asia Championship).

== Summary ==
Year	Host	Final			Third-place game		
Year	Host	Champion	Score	Second Place	Third Place	Score	Fourth Place
2009; Details	(Japan); Komaki	South Korea	68–58	Japan	China	107–90	Chinese Taipei
2011; Details	(China); Nanjing	South Korea	89–73	Japan	China	87–53	Chinese Taipei
2013; Details	(South Korea); Incheon	South Korea	79–68	China	Japan	87–71	Hong Kong
2017; Details	(Japan); Nagano	Chinese Taipei	77–64	South Korea	Japan	76–58	China

== See also ==
- 2009 FIBA Asia Championship qualification
- 2011 FIBA Asia Championship qualification
- 2013 FIBA Asia Championship qualification
- 2017 FIBA Asia Cup qualification
