= Basketball at the 1978 Asian Games =

- Venue: Nimibutr Stadium
- Date: 9–19 December 1978
- Nations: 14

Basketball was one of the 20 sports disciplines held in the 1978 Asian Games in Bangkok, Thailand. China won their 1st title by beating last edition's finalist South Korea in the championship match. The games were held from December 9 to 20, 1978.

== Medalists ==
| Event | Gold | Silver | Bronze |
|---|---|---|---|
| Men | China; Chen Kai; He Juhua; Huang Pinjie; Kuang Lubin; Liu Jizeng; Mu Tiezhu; Wang Deli; Wang Zongxing; Xing Weining; Zhang Mingshu; Zhang Weiping | South Korea; Cho Myung-soo; Choi Bu-young; Ha Dong-gi; Hwang Yu-ha; Kim Dong-kwang; Kim Hyung-nyun; Lee Chung-hee; Lee Moon-kyu; Lee Soo-gi; Park In-kyu; Park Soo-kyo; Shin Sun-woo | North Korea; An Gwang-gyun; Ja Myung-sam; Jo Nae-un; Kim Jin-geun; Kim Mu-myong; Kim Myung-jun; O Heung-ryong; O Tung-sik; Ri Eui-chol; Ri Geun-gwan; Ri Jung-bok; So Won-bae |
| Women | South Korea; Cho Eun-ja; Cho Young-ran; Choi Seung-hee; Chun Kyung-suk; Hong He-ran; Hong Young-soon; Jung Hee-sook; Jung Mi-ra; Kang Hyun-suk; Lee Hyang-ju; Park Chan-sook; Song Keum-soon | China; Fan Guilan; Fan Huifang; Jiao Li; Luo Xuelian; Peng Nian; Song Xiaobo; Sun Ruiyun; Yu Aifeng; Zhang Lijun; Zhang Mingxiang; Zhao Aili | Japan; Hiromi Amano; Keiko Araki; Mieko Fukui; Setsuko Hashizume; Rieko Itani; Tomoko Iwasaki; Hiroko Nakagawa; Chiemi Sato; Kazuko Sato; Tomoko Shibukawa; Kanoko Suzuki; Noriko Suzuki |

== Medal table ==
| Rank | Nation | Gold | Silver | Bronze | Total |
|---|---|---|---|---|---|
| 1 | China (CHN) | 1 | 1 | 0 | 2 |
| 1 | South Korea (KOR) | 1 | 1 | 0 | 2 |
| 3 | Japan (JPN) | 0 | 0 | 1 | 1 |
| 3 | North Korea (PRK) | 0 | 0 | 1 | 1 |
| Totals (4 entries) | | 2 | 2 | 2 | 6 |

== Results ==
=== Men ===
==== Preliminary round ====
===== Group A =====
| Pos | Team | Pld | W | L | PF | PA | PD | Pts | Qualification |
|---|---|---|---|---|---|---|---|---|---|
| 1 | South Korea | 4 | 4 | 0 | 427 | 293 | +134 | 8 | Final round |
| 2 | Philippines | 4 | 3 | 1 | 347 | 296 | +51 | 7 | Final round |
| 3 | Pakistan | 4 | 2 | 2 | 337 | 323 | +14 | 6 | Classification 7th–14th |
| 4 | Saudi Arabia | 4 | 1 | 3 | 269 | 313 | −44 | 5 | Classification 7th–14th |
| 5 | Bahrain | 4 | 0 | 4 | 221 | 376 | −155 | 4 | Classification 7th–14th |

Source: Results

9 December

| Philippines | 85–79 | Pakistan |

Nimibutr Stadium, Bangkok

9 December

| Saudi Arabia | 69–45 | Bahrain |

Nimibutr Stadium, Bangkok

10 December

| South Korea | 101–70 | Saudi Arabia |

Nimibutr Stadium, Bangkok

10 December

| Philippines | 97–49 | Bahrain |

Nimibutr Stadium, Bangkok

11 December

| Pakistan | 86–74 | Bahrain |

Nimibutr Stadium, Bangkok

11 December

| Philippines | 78–95 | South Korea |

Nimibutr Stadium, Bangkok

12 December

| Saudi Arabia | 73–87 | Philippines |

Nimibutr Stadium, Bangkok

12 December

| South Korea | 107–92 | Pakistan |

Nimibutr Stadium, Bangkok

13 December

| Pakistan | 80–57 | Saudi Arabia |

Nimibutr Stadium, Bangkok

13 December

| South Korea | 124–53 | Bahrain |

Nimibutr Stadium, Bangkok

===== Group B =====
| Pos | Team | Pld | W | L | PF | PA | PD | Pts | Qualification |
|---|---|---|---|---|---|---|---|---|---|
| 1 | North Korea | 4 | 4 | 0 | 425 | 251 | +174 | 8 | Final round |
| 2 | Japan | 4 | 3 | 1 | 415 | 272 | +143 | 7 | Final round |
| 3 | Malaysia | 4 | 2 | 2 | 413 | 275 | +138 | 6 | Classification 7th–14th |
| 4 | Hong Kong | 4 | 1 | 3 | 325 | 367 | −42 | 5 | Classification 7th–14th |
| 5 | Qatar | 4 | 0 | 4 | 163 | 576 | −413 | 4 | Classification 7th–14th |

Source: Results

9 December

| Hong Kong | 113–50 | Qatar |

Nimibutr Stadium, Bangkok

9 December

| Japan | 88–73 | Malaysia |

Nimibutr Stadium, Bangkok

10 December

| Japan | 149–40 | Qatar |

Nimibutr Stadium, Bangkok

10 December

| North Korea | 74–63 | Malaysia |

Nimibutr Stadium, Bangkok

11 December

| North Korea | 151–36 | Qatar |

Nimibutr Stadium, Bangkok

11 December

| Japan | 103–59 | Hong Kong |

Nimibutr Stadium, Bangkok

12 December

| Malaysia | 114–76 | Hong Kong |

Nimibutr Stadium, Bangkok

12 December

| Japan | 75–100 | North Korea |

Nimibutr Stadium, Bangkok

13 December

| North Korea | 100–77 | Hong Kong |

Nimibutr Stadium, Bangkok

13 December

| Malaysia | 163–37 | Qatar |

Nimibutr Stadium, Bangkok

===== Group C =====
| Pos | Team | Pld | W | L | PF | PA | PD | Pts | Qualification |
|---|---|---|---|---|---|---|---|---|---|
| 1 | China | 3 | 3 | 0 | 315 | 157 | +158 | 6 | Final round |
| 2 | Thailand | 3 | 2 | 1 | 203 | 264 | −61 | 5 | Final round |
| 3 | Iraq | 3 | 1 | 2 | 206 | 237 | −31 | 4 | Classification 7th–14th |
| 4 | Kuwait | 3 | 0 | 3 | 179 | 245 | −66 | 3 | Classification 7th–14th |

Source: Results

9 December

| China | 88–57 | Kuwait |

Nimibutr Stadium, Bangkok

10 December

| Iraq | 84–55 | Kuwait |

Nimibutr Stadium, Bangkok

11 December

| China | 104–48 | Iraq |

Nimibutr Stadium, Bangkok

11 December

| Thailand | 73–67 | Kuwait |

Nimibutr Stadium, Bangkok

12 December

| Thailand | 78–74 | Iraq |

Nimibutr Stadium, Bangkok

13 December

| China | 123–52 | Thailand |

Nimibutr Stadium, Bangkok

==== Classification 7th–14th ====
- The results and the points of the matches between the same teams that were already played during the preliminary round shall be taken into account for the classification round.

| Pos | Team | Pld | W | L | Pts |
|---|---|---|---|---|---|
| 1 | Malaysia | 7 | 7 | 0 | 14 |
| 2 | Pakistan | 7 | 6 | 1 | 13 |
| 3 | Iraq | 7 | 5 | 2 | 12 |
| 4 | Kuwait | 7 | 4 | 3 | 11 |
| 5 | Hong Kong | 7 | 3 | 4 | 10 |
| 6 | Saudi Arabia | 7 | 2 | 5 | 9 |
| 7 | Bahrain | 7 | 1 | 6 | 8 |
| 8 | Qatar | 7 | 0 | 7 | 7 |

Source: Results

14 December

| Kuwait | 112–33 | Qatar |

Nimibutr Stadium, Bangkok

14 December

| Pakistan | 88–101 | Malaysia |

Nimibutr Stadium, Bangkok

14 December

| Iraq | vs. | Hong Kong |

Nimibutr Stadium, Bangkok

15 December

| Iraq | 140–38 | Qatar |

Nimibutr Stadium, Bangkok

15 December

| Saudi Arabia | 69–71 | Hong Kong |

Nimibutr Stadium, Bangkok

15 December

| Pakistan | 82–80 | Kuwait |

Nimibutr Stadium, Bangkok

15 December

| Malaysia | vs. | Bahrain |

Nimibutr Stadium, Bangkok

16 December

| Hong Kong | 101–64 | Bahrain |

Nimibutr Stadium, Bangkok

16 December

| Saudi Arabia | 59–61 | Kuwait |

Nimibutr Stadium, Bangkok

16 December

| Pakistan | 86–80 | Iraq |

Nimibutr Stadium, Bangkok

17 December

| Malaysia | vs. | Iraq |

Nimibutr Stadium, Bangkok

17 December

| Kuwait | vs. | Bahrain |

Nimibutr Stadium, Bangkok

17 December

| Saudi Arabia | vs. | Qatar |

Nimibutr Stadium, Bangkok

18 December

| Kuwait | 91–77 | Hong Kong |

Nimibutr Stadium, Bangkok

18 December

| Iraq | 93–52 | Bahrain |

Nimibutr Stadium, Bangkok

18 December

| Pakistan | 150–63 | Qatar |

Nimibutr Stadium, Bangkok

18 December

| Malaysia | 94–88 | Saudi Arabia |

Nimibutr Stadium, Bangkok

19 December

| Malaysia | 85–66 | Kuwait |

Nimibutr Stadium, Bangkok

19 December

| Iraq | 89–64 | Saudi Arabia |

Nimibutr Stadium, Bangkok

19 December

| Pakistan | vs. | Hong Kong |

Nimibutr Stadium, Bangkok

19 December

| Bahrain | vs. | Qatar |

Nimibutr Stadium, Bangkok

==== Final round ====
- The results and the points of the matches between the same teams that were already played during the preliminary round shall be taken into account for the final round.

| Pos | Team | Pld | W | L | Pts |
|---|---|---|---|---|---|
| 1 | China | 5 | 5 | 0 | 10 |
| 2 | South Korea | 5 | 4 | 1 | 9 |
| 3 | North Korea | 5 | 3 | 2 | 7 |
| 4 | Japan | 5 | 2 | 3 | 7 |
| 5 | Philippines | 5 | 1 | 4 | 6 |
| 6 | Thailand | 5 | 0 | 5 | 5 |

Source: Results

14 December

| China | 95–76 | Japan |

Nimibutr Stadium, Bangkok

14 December

| Philippines | vs. | Thailand |

Nimibutr Stadium, Bangkok

15 December

| South Korea | 85–76 | Japan |

Nimibutr Stadium, Bangkok

15 December

| North Korea | 86–71 | Philippines |

Nimibutr Stadium, Bangkok

16 December

| South Korea | 2–0 | North Korea |

Nimibutr Stadium, Bangkok

16 December

Results

| China | 107–85 | Philippines |

Nimibutr Stadium, Bangkok

17 December

| North Korea | 108–66 | Thailand |

Nimibutr Stadium, Bangkok

17 December

| Japan | vs. | Philippines |

Nimibutr Stadium, Bangkok

18 December

| South Korea | 108–66 | Thailand |

Nimibutr Stadium, Bangkok

18 December

| North Korea | 80–115 | China |

Nimibutr Stadium, Bangkok

19 December

| Japan | 92–68 | Thailand |

Nimibutr Stadium, Bangkok

19 December

| South Korea | 71–91 | China |

Nimibutr Stadium, Bangkok

==== Final standing ====
| Rank | Team | Pld | W | L |
|---|---|---|---|---|
| 1st place, gold medalist(s) | China | 7 | 7 | 0 |
| 2nd place, silver medalist(s) | South Korea | 8 | 7 | 1 |
| 3rd place, bronze medalist(s) | North Korea | 8 | 6 | 2 |
| 4 | Japan | 8 | 5 | 3 |
| 5 | Philippines | 8 | 4 | 4 |
| 6 | Thailand | 7 | 2 | 5 |
| 7 | Malaysia | 9 | 7 | 2 |
| 8 | Pakistan | 9 | 6 | 3 |
| 9 | Iraq | 9 | 5 | 4 |
| 10 | Kuwait | 9 | 4 | 5 |
| 11 | Hong Kong | 9 | 3 | 6 |
| 12 | Saudi Arabia | 9 | 2 | 7 |
| 13 | Bahrain | 9 | 1 | 8 |
| 14 | Qatar | 9 | 0 | 9 |

=== Women ===
| Pos | Team | Pld | W | L | Pts |
|---|---|---|---|---|---|
| 1 | South Korea | 4 | 4 | 0 | 8 |
| 2 | China | 4 | 3 | 1 | 7 |
| 3 | Japan | 4 | 2 | 2 | 6 |
| 4 | Thailand | 4 | 1 | 3 | 5 |
| 5 | Malaysia | 4 | 0 | 4 | 4 |

Source: Results

10 December

| Thailand | 61–53 | Malaysia |

Nimibutr Stadium, Bangkok

11 December

| Japan | 49–67 | China |

Nimibutr Stadium, Bangkok

12 December

| Malaysia | 20–106 | South Korea |

Nimibutr Stadium, Bangkok

13 December

| China | 123–52 | Thailand |

Nimibutr Stadium, Bangkok

14 December

| South Korea | 63–48 | Japan |

Nimibutr Stadium, Bangkok

15 December

| China | vs. | Malaysia |

Nimibutr Stadium, Bangkok

16 December

| Thailand | 49–97 | South Korea |

Nimibutr Stadium, Bangkok

17 December

| Japan | 85–29 | Malaysia |

Nimibutr Stadium, Bangkok

18 December

| Japan | vs. | Thailand |

Nimibutr Stadium, Bangkok

19 December

| South Korea | 77–68 | China |

Nimibutr Stadium, Bangkok

==== Final standing ====
| Rank | Team | Pld | W | L |
|---|---|---|---|---|
| 1st place, gold medalist(s) | South Korea | 4 | 4 | 0 |
| 2nd place, silver medalist(s) | China | 4 | 3 | 1 |
| 3rd place, bronze medalist(s) | Japan | 4 | 2 | 2 |
| 4 | Thailand | 4 | 1 | 3 |
| 5 | Malaysia | 4 | 0 | 4 |
