= 2009 FIBA Asia Championship qualification =

The 2009 FIBA Asia Championship qualification was held in early 2009 with the Gulf region, West Asia, Southeast Asia, East Asia and Middle Asia (Central Asia and South Asia) each conducting tournaments.

== Qualification format ==
The following are eligible to participate:

- The organizing country.
- The champion team from the previous FIBA Asia Stanković Cup.
- The four best-placed teams from the previous FIBA Asia Stanković Cup will qualify the same number of teams from their respective sub-zones.
- The two best teams from the sub-zones.

== FIBA Asia Stanković Cup ==
Rank	Team	Note
1st place, gold medalist(s)	Jordan	Direct Qualifier
2nd place, silver medalist(s)	Kazakhstan	Middle Asia (+1)
3rd place, bronze medalist(s)	Kuwait	Gulf (+1)
4	Qatar	Gulf (+2)
5	India	Middle Asia (+2)

== Qualified teams ==
East Asia (1+2)	Gulf (2+2)	Middle Asia (2+2)	Southeast Asia (2)	West Asia (1+2)
China	Qatar	India	Philippines	Jordan
South Korea	Kuwait	Kazakhstan	Indonesia	Iran
Japan	United Arab Emirates	Sri Lanka		Lebanon
	~~Bahrain~~ *	Uzbekistan		

* Chinese Taipei, which finished fourth behind Korea, Japan and China in the East Asian qualifiers, was given a wild card entry into the championship following the withdrawal of Gulf representatives Bahrain.

== East Asia ==
The East Asia Basketball Championship for Men 2009 is the qualifying tournament for the 2009 FIBA Asia Championship. It also serves as a regional championship involving East Asian basketball teams. the two best teams excluding China qualifies for 2009 FIBA Asia Championship.

=== Preliminary round ===
==== Group A ====
Team	Pld	W	L	PF	PA	PD	Pts
South Korea	2	2	0	162	133	+29	4
China	2	1	1	161	134	+27	3
Hong Kong	2	0	2	135	191	−56	2

June 10
15:30

Hong Kong	64–99	China
Scoring by quarter: 16–30, 21–23, 19–24, 8–22

Park Arena Komaki, Komaki

June 11
15:30

China	62–70	South Korea
Scoring by quarter: 12–21, 16–5, 23–26, 11–18

Park Arena Komaki, Komaki

June 12
15:30

South Korea	92–71	Hong Kong
Scoring by quarter: 24–10, 29–22, 20–17, 19–22

Park Arena Komaki, Komaki

==== Group B ====
Team	Pld	W	L	PF	PA	PD	Pts
Japan	2	2	0	187	131	+56	4
Chinese Taipei	2	1	1	165	137	+28	3
Mongolia	2	0	2	124	208	−84	2

June 10
18:30

Chinese Taipei	66–78	Japan
Scoring by quarter: 16–17, 18–12, 10–27, 22–22

Park Arena Komaki, Komaki

June 11
18:30

Japan	109–65	Mongolia
Scoring by quarter: 26–9, 26–16, 23–16, 34–24

Park Arena Komaki, Komaki

June 12
18:30

Mongolia	59–99	Chinese Taipei
Scoring by quarter: 20–24, 15–24, 12–24, 12–27

Park Arena Komaki, Komaki

=== Classification 5th–6th ===
June 13
19:00

Hong Kong	92–73	Mongolia
Scoring by quarter: 35–28, 14–18, 23–18, 20–9

Park Arena Komaki, Komaki

=== Final round ===
Semifinals
June 13
South Korea	86
Chinese Taipei	71
June 13
Japan	68
China	63

Final
June 14
South Korea	68
Japan	58
3rd place
June 14
Chinese Taipei	90
China	107

==== Semifinals ====
June 13
13:00

South Korea	86–71	Chinese Taipei
Scoring by quarter: 15–17, 17–9, 28–27, 26–18

Park Arena Komaki, Komaki

June 13
16:00

Japan	68–63	China
Scoring by quarter: 14–18, 15–8, 17–10, 22–27

Park Arena Komaki, Komaki

==== 3rd place ====
June 14
13:00

Chinese Taipei	90–107	China
Scoring by quarter: 27–36, 18–19, 18–26, 27–26

Park Arena Komaki, Komaki

==== Final ====
June 14
16:00

South Korea	68–58	Japan
Scoring by quarter: 19–19, 19–18, 15–12, 15–9

Park Arena Komaki, Komaki

=== Final standing ===
Rank	Team
1st place, gold medalist(s)	South Korea
2nd place, silver medalist(s)	Japan
3rd place, bronze medalist(s)	China
4	Chinese Taipei
5	Hong Kong
6	Mongolia

== Gulf ==
The 19th Gulf Cup was held in Muscat, Oman.

Team	Pld	W	L	PF	PA	PD	Pts
Qatar	4	4	0	299	237	+62	8
Kuwait	4	3	1	282	255	+27	7
United Arab Emirates	4	2	2	327	280	+47	6
Bahrain	4	1	3	320	276	+44	5
Oman	4	0	4	214	394	−180	4

January 3
17:30

Kuwait	75–67	Bahrain

Nizwa Sports Complex, Muscat

January 3
19:30

Qatar	82–80	United Arab Emirates

Nizwa Sports Complex, Muscat

January 5
13:00

Kuwait	44–60	Qatar

Nizwa Sports Complex, Muscat

January 5
15:00

United Arab Emirates	102–53	Oman

Nizwa Sports Complex, Muscat

January 7
13:00

Oman	52–110	Bahrain

Nizwa Sports Complex, Muscat

January 7
15:00

United Arab Emirates	66–68	Kuwait

Nizwa Sports Complex, Muscat

January 9
13:00

Bahrain	66–70	Qatar

Nizwa Sports Complex, Muscat

January 9
15:00

Kuwait	95–62	Oman

Nizwa Sports Complex, Muscat

January 11
14:00

Oman	47–87	Qatar

Nizwa Sports Complex, Muscat

January 11
16:00

United Arab Emirates	79–77	Bahrain

Nizwa Sports Complex, Muscat

== Middle Asia ==
All the others withdrew, so India, Kazakhstan, Sri Lanka and Uzbekistan qualified automatically.

== Southeast Asia ==
A tournament was held to determine Southeast Asia's two representatives to the FIBA Asia Championship. The qualifying tournament also served as the zonal championship, which held in Medan, Indonesia from June 6 to 9.

=== Preliminary round ===
Team	Pld	W	L	PF	PA	PD	Pts
Philippines	3	3	0	320	206	+114	6
Indonesia	3	2	1	217	235	−18	5
Malaysia	3	1	2	222	244	−22	4
Singapore	3	0	3	204	278	−74	3

June 6
19:00

Malaysia	73–100	Philippines

Angkasapura Lanud Hall, Medan

June 6
21:00

Singapore	65–79	Indonesia

Angkasapura Lanud Hall, Medan

June 7
19:00

Singapore	70–82	Malaysia

Angkasapura Lanud Hall, Medan

June 7
21:00

Philippines	103–64	Indonesia

Angkasapura Lanud Hall, Medan

June 8
19:00

Singapore	69–117	Philippines

Angkasapura Lanud Hall, Medan

June 8
21:00

Malaysia	67–74	Indonesia

Angkasapura Lanud Hall, Medan

=== Final ===
June 9
19:00

Philippines	98–68	Indonesia

Angkasapura Lanud Hall, Medan

=== Final standing ===
Rank	Team
1st place, gold medalist(s)	Philippines
2nd place, silver medalist(s)	Indonesia
3rd place, bronze medalist(s)	Malaysia
4	Singapore

== West Asia ==
All the others withdrew, so Iran and Lebanon qualified automatically.
