= Chinese Basketball Association (organisation) =

National governing body of basketball in China

- 中国篮球协会
- Abbreviation: CBA
- Formation: 1956
- Headquarters: Dongcheng, Beijing, China
- Location: 4 Tiyuguan Road, Dongcheng, Beijing, China
- Region served: China
- Official language: Chinese
- Chairman: Guo Zhenming
- Executive vice chairman: Li Jinsheng
- Parent organization: State General Administration of Sports
- Website: CBA (in Chinese)
- Remarks: Remarks (in Chinese)

The Chinese Basketball Association (simplified Chinese: 中国篮球协会; traditional Chinese: 中國籃球協會; pinyin: Zhōngguó Lánqiú Xiéhuì), often abbreviated as CBA, is a national non-profit sports organisation in China. It represents China in the International Basketball Federation (FIBA) and FIBA Asia, as well as the sport of basketball in the All-China Sports Federation.

== Governance ==
Basketball in China is officially governed by both the Chinese Basketball Management Centre (CBMC), a division of the State General Administration of Sports and the CBA, which is the nationwide non-governmental sports organisation and non-profit association that manages the country's premier CBA League (and not the same as this organization). In practice the same officials are at both organisations, ensuring government control of the supposedly commercial operation.

Chinese basketball legend and former Shanghai Sharks owner Yao Ming has long held ambitions to reform the structure of Chinese basketball to address shortcomings in team management, development, training and facilities and to make it more commercially successful. As a member of the CPPCC he has each year since 2013 proposed reforms, unsuccessfully.

In February 2017 at the CBA national congress, Yao was unanimously elected president of the association – the first time a non-official had ever taken up the post. Five days after taking up the post, Yao submitted a proposal to the Chinese Basketball Association comprising three major reforms: split the league into two conferences and increase the number of games; limit the time that players spent training for the national team and adopt the invitation system used by the NBA; and put a cap on the court time of non-Chinese Asian players.

The plan was reportedly rejected and hushed up. However, at least one of the proposals was eventually implemented—an expansion of the CBA league schedule from 36 to 46 games.
