= Keisei Tominaga =

Japanese basketball player (born 2001)

Keisei Tominaga 富永 啓生
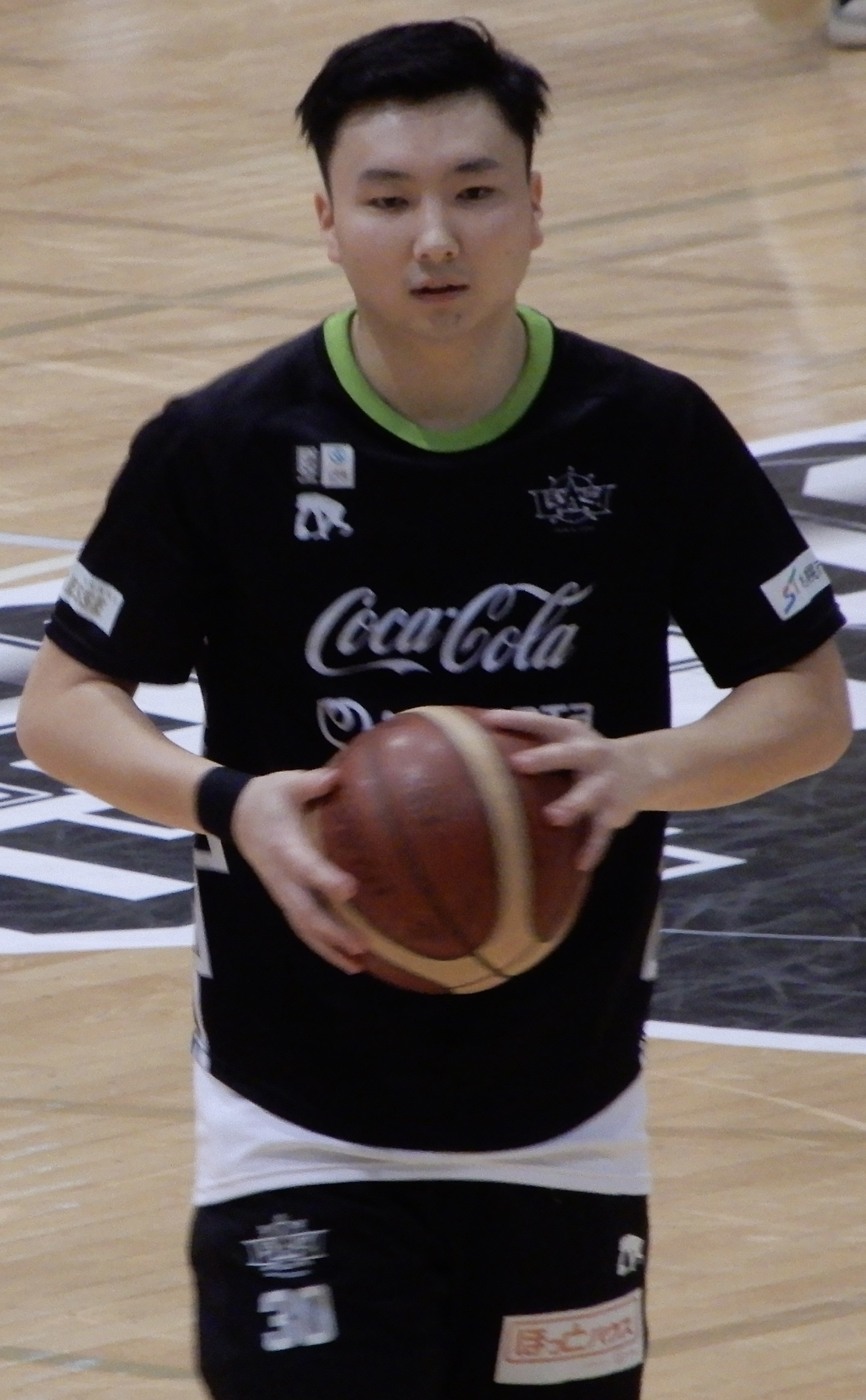
- Tominaga with the Levanga Hokkaido in 2025

No. 30 – Levanga Hokkaido
- Position: Point guard / shooting guard
- League: B.League

Personal information
- Born: February 1, 2001 (age 25) Moriyama-ku, Nagoya, Aichi, Japan
- Listed height: 6 ft 2 in (1.88 m)
- Listed weight: 178 lb (81 kg)

Career information
- High school: Sakuragaoka Gakuen (Toyohashi, Aichi)
- College: Ranger (2019–2021); Nebraska (2021–2024)
- NBA draft: 2024: undrafted
- Playing career: 2024–present

Career history
- 2024: NBA G League United
- 2024–2025: Indiana Mad Ants
- 2025–present: Levanga Hokkaido

Career highlights
- NBA G League Up Next Game (2025); Second-team All-Big Ten – Coaches (2024); Second-team Division I NJCAA All-American (2021); 2× First Team All-NTJCAC (2020, 2021); NTJCAC Freshman of the Year (2020)
- Stats at NBA.com
- Stats at Basketball Reference

Keisei Tominaga (富永 啓生, Tominaga Keisei; born February 1, 2001) is a Japanese professional basketball player for the Levanga Hokkaido of the B.League. He played college basketball for the Nebraska Cornhuskers, after having previously played for Ranger College. Tominaga has been a member of the Japan men's national basketball team and the national 3x3 team.

== High school career ==
Tominaga attended Sakuragaoka Gakuen High School in Aichi Prefecture and played for its basketball team. As a senior, he averaged 39.8 points per game at the All-Japan Championship, an annual national high school tournament. During the third-place game, he posted a tournament-high 46 points in a 76–65 win over the Teikyo Nagaoka of Niigata Prefecture.

== College career ==
=== Ranger ===
==== Freshman ====
On November 1, 2019, Tominaga made his collegiate debut for Ranger College, against Missouri State University–West Plains, scoring 19 points in a 100–84 win. On November 16, he logged a season-high 34 points in a 110–60 victory against Victoria College.

As a freshman, Tominaga averaged 16.8 points, 2.3 rebounds and 0.7 assists per game while shooting 54.9 percent from the field and 47.9 percent from 3-point range. In his efforts, Tominaga earned the NJCAA All-Region V Team and the First Team All-Northern Texas Junior College Athletic Conference honors. He was also named conference Freshman of The Year, leading the conference in 3-point shooting and ranking sixth in both scoring and field goal percentage.

With Tominaga playing for Ranger College, the team finished the season with a 28–3 record, helping them clinch a position in the NJCAA national tournament. However, the season ended early due to COVID-19. Ranger eventually finished second in the NJCAA national rankings.

==== Sophomore ====
On March 3, 2021, Tominaga scored a season-high 39 points, knocking down 11 3-pointers in a 113–102 win over Grayson College. Three days later, he had 26 points in a win against Temple College. In his efforts, Tominaga set a school record for career 3-pointers with 139, previously held by Brayan Au with 130. For his performance, Tominaga was named Northern Texas Junior College Athletic Conference Player of the Week for February 28 to March 6. On April 22, Tominaga posted a game-high 25 points, sinking five 3-pointers in an 87–83 win against South Plains College, sending the Rangers to the Final Four round of the NJCAA Division I Championship. Despite his team-high 26-point performance in the semifinals, the team lost to Cowley County Community College. Ranger College finished its season with a 23–5 record.

Tominaga averaged 16.3 points, 2.4 rebounds and 1.6 assists per game while shooting 51.0 percent from the field and 48.7 percent from 3-point range as a sophomore, earning him the NJCAA All-Region V Team and the First Team All-Northern Texas Junior College Athletic Conference honors for the second time in a row. He was named to the NJCAA Division I All-Tournament Team and was the recipient of the Charles Sesher Sportsmanship Award. Tominaga also earned the NJCAA Division I Second-Team All-American honors.

On November 11, 2020, Hoiberg announced that Tominaga signed a National Letter of Intent to transfer to Nebraska for the next season. On November 28, Tominaga verbally committed to play for NCAA Division I program Nebraska, under former NBA coach Fred Hoiberg for the 2021 class.

=== Nebraska ===
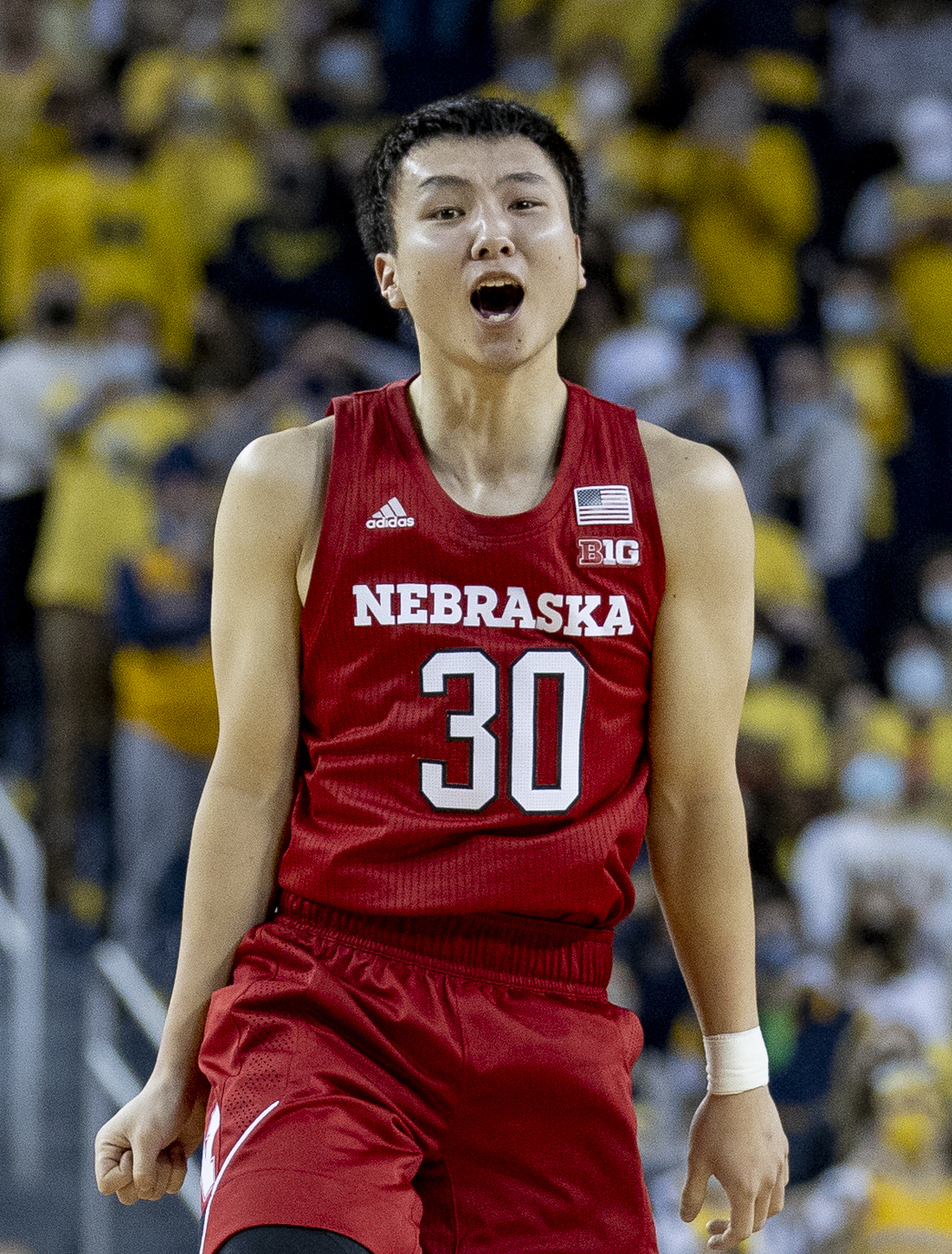
[Tominaga with the Nebraska Cornhuskers in 2022.

==== Second sophomore season ====
Tominaga transferred to the University of Nebraska–Lincoln on a full scholarship to play for the Cornhuskers. Due to COVID-19, the NCAA ruled that the 2020–21 season would not count against the eligibility of any student-athlete in any of the organization's winter sports, including basketball, giving Tominaga three years of eligibility instead of two. He made his debut for Nebraska on November 9, 2021, against Western Illinois, finishing with three points, one rebound and three steals across 18 minutes of play in a 75–74 loss. On November 27, Tominaga posted a season-high 23 points on 8-of-11 shooting from the field and 5-of-6 from three, along with two assists and two steals in an 83–70 win over South Dakota.

==== Junior season ====
As a junior, Tominaga averaged 13.1 points, 1.3 rebounds, 0.7 assists and 0.6 steals per game, and was named an All-Big Ten honorable mention. Among Big Ten players, his average of 20.3 points per game from February 1, 2023, to the end of the season trailed only Zach Edey and Trayce Jackson-Davis. After initially entering his name into the 2023 NBA draft, on May 31, 2023, Tominaga announced his withdrawal and intent to return to Nebraska for his senior season.

== Professional career ==
=== Indiana Mad Ants (2024–2025) ===
After going undrafted in the 2024 NBA draft, Tominaga signed with the Indiana Pacers on September 26, 2024, but was waived the next day. On October 27, he joined the Indiana Mad Ants.

=== Levanga Hokkaido (2025–present) ===
On June 3, 2025, it was announced that Tominaga had signed with Levanga Hokkaido.

== National team career ==
=== Junior national team ===
Tominaga made his international debut when he was selected to be a part of the Japanese squad that competed at the 2018 FIBA Under-16 Asian Championship, where he led the team in efficiency (13.3) and points (17.5) per game. His tournament highlights included a game-high 27-point outing, knocking down seven 3-pointers and scoring 19 points in five minutes in a 109–57 victory against India. Tominaga finished the tournament as the fourth-leading scorer.

Later that year, Tominaga suited up for Japan at the 2018 FIBA Under-18 Asian Championship, leading the team in efficiency (14.6) and points (19.3) per game once more. In a game against Bahrain, Japan was down 70–58 with five minutes left to play, Tominaga then logged 11 points in two minutes, cutting the lead to three points. He finished the game with 33 points, helping Japan secure the win. Tominaga was the tournament’s fifth best scorer.

=== Senior national team ===
Tominaga earned his first senior national team call up after being named to the 12-man roster that represented Japan for the third window of the 2023 FIBA Basketball World Cup Asian Qualifiers held in Australia. In his debut match against the tournament's host team, Tominaga scored a game-high 18 points, knocking down five 3-pointers coming off the bench. He led the team in scoring with 17.5 points per game, drilling down five 3-pointers.

Following his impressive debut, Tominaga played for the national team at the 2022 FIBA Asia Cup. In the quarterfinals, Japan's first appearance since 2015, Tominaga logged a game-high 33 points, knocking down eight 3-pointers in a 99–85 loss against Australia. Tominaga finished the tournament ranking second in points (15.2) and third in efficiency (12.0) per game for the team.

=== 3x3 national team ===
Tominaga represented Japan at the Asia-Europe Conference of the 2019 FIBA 3x3 Under-23 Nations League, where the team ranked last among six contenders.

Two years later, Tominaga starred for Japan at the 2020 Summer Olympics, where he became the youngest player to represent Japan in 3x3 basketball. He led the team in scoring with 6.9 points per game. Tominaga ranked near the top of a number of key categories in the tournament, including fourth in scoring, second in one-point shooting and seventh in two-point shooting. (Note: In 3x3 basketball, successful shots taken from outside of what is the three-point line in full-court basketball are worth 2 points. All other successful shots, whether field goals or free throws, are worth 1 point.)

== Player profile ==
Tominaga is known for his shooting ability beyond the arc and jump shot similar to NBA player Stephen Curry, which earned him the nickname the "Japanese Steph Curry".

== Career statistics ==
Legend
GP	Games played	GS	Games started	MPG	Minutes per game
FG%	Field goal percentage	3P%	3-point field goal percentage	FT%	Free throw percentage
RPG	Rebounds per game	APG	Assists per game	SPG	Steals per game
BPG	Blocks per game	PPG	Points per game	**Bold**	Career high

=== College ===
==== NCAA Division I ====
Year	Team	GP	GS	MPG	FG%	3P%	FT%	RPG	APG	SPG	BPG	PPG
2021–22	Nebraska	30	11	16.5	.373	.330	.842	1.5	0.6	0.8	0.0	5.7
2022–23	Nebraska	32	14	25.1	**.503**	**.400**	.868	1.6	0.7	0.6	**0.1**	13.1
2023–24	Nebraska	**32**	**32**	**26.1**	.466	.376	**.875**	**2.3**	**1.4**	**0.9**	0.0	**15.1**
Career		94	57	22.7	.462	.374	.868	1.8	0.9	0.7	0.0	11.4

==== JUCO ====
Year	Team	GP	GS	MPG	FG%	3P%	FT%	RPG	APG	SPG	BPG	PPG
2019–20	Ranger	**31**	**28**	2.0	**.549**	.479	.855	2.3	0.7	**1.1**	**0.3**	**16.8**
2020–21	Ranger	27	24	**6.8**	.510	**.487**	**.883**	**2.4**	**1.6**	1.0	0.1	16.3
Career		58	52	4.4	.530	.483	.869	2.4	1.1	1.1	0.2	16.6

== Personal life ==
Tominaga was born on February 1, 2001, in Moriyama, Nagoya, Aichi, Japan to parents with basketball experience. His father, Hiroyuki, was a 6 ft 11 in (2.11 m) center, who played professional basketball for Mitsubishi Electric from 1996 to 2006 and was a member of the Japanese national team that competed during the 1998 FIBA World Championship. Tominaga’s mother, Hitomi, was an industrial league player also for the women's team of Mitsubishi Electric. Tominaga has one younger sister, Chihiro.
