= Hussain Ahmed =

Hussain Ahmed may refer to:

- Hussain Ahmed (basketball) (born 1989), Emirati basketball player
- Hussain Ahmed (footballer) (1932–2021), Indian footballer
- Hussain Ahmad Madani (1879–1957), Indian Islamic scholar, recipient of Padma Bhushan
- Hafiz Hussain Ahmed (born 1951), Pakistani politician and Islamic scholar from Balochistan
- Kobad Hussain Ahmed, Indian politician from Assam in the 1950s and 1960s
- Hussain Rasheed Ahmed (born 1957), Maldivian Sunni Islamic scholar and political leader
- Qazi Hussain Ahmad (1938–2013), Islamist political party president
