= 1997 ABC Championship =

بطولة أمم آسيا لكرة السلة 1997

Tournament details
- Host country: Saudi Arabia
- Dates: September 11–19
- Teams: 15
- Venue: 1 (in 1 host city)

Final positions
- Champions: South Korea (2nd title)
- Runners-up: Japan
- Third place: China
- Fourth place: Saudi Arabia

Tournament statistics
- MVP: (South Korea) Chun Hee-Chul

The 1997 Men's Asian Basketball Confederation Championship was held in Riyadh, Saudi Arabia.

== Qualification ==
According to the FIBA Asia rules, each zone had two places, and the hosts (Saudi Arabia) and the best 5 teams of the previous Asian Championship were automatically qualified.

| East Asia (4+2) | Gulf (1+2) | Middle Asia (1+2) | Southeast Asia (2) | West Asia (2) |
|---|---|---|---|---|
| China | Saudi Arabia | Kazakhstan | Indonesia | Iran |
| South Korea | United Arab Emirates | India | Philippines | Jordan |
| Japan | Bahrain | Bangladesh | | |
| Chinese Taipei | | | | |
| Hong Kong | | | | |
| ~~TBD~~ | | | | |

== Preliminary round ==
=== Group A ===
| Team | Pld | W | L | PF | PA | PD | Pts |
|---|---|---|---|---|---|---|---|
| China | 3 | 3 | 0 | 280 | 198 | +82 | 6 |
| Iran | 3 | 2 | 1 | 215 | 242 | −27 | 5 |
| Bahrain | 3 | 1 | 2 | 197 | 214 | −17 | 4 |
| Philippines | 3 | 0 | 3 | 216 | 254 | −38 | 3 |

September 11

| China | 74–60 | Bahrain |
Scoring by half: 35–42, 39–18

GPYW Indoor Stadium, Riyadh

September 11

| Iran | 77–76 | Philippines |
Scoring by half: 35–38, 42–38

GPYW Indoor Stadium, Riyadh

September 12

| China | 107–72 | Philippines |
Scoring by half: 57–27, 50–45

GPYW Indoor Stadium, Riyadh

September 12

| Bahrain | 67–72 | Iran |
Scoring by half: 37–38, 30–34

GPYW Indoor Stadium, Riyadh

September 13

| China | 99–66 | Iran |
Scoring by half: 52–34, 47–32

GPYW Indoor Stadium, Riyadh

September 13

| Philippines | 68–70 | Bahrain |
Scoring by half: 38–38, 30–32

GPYW Indoor Stadium, Riyadh

=== Group B ===
| Team | Pld | W | L | PF | PA | PD | Pts |
|---|---|---|---|---|---|---|---|
| South Korea | 3 | 3 | 0 | 326 | 196 | +130 | 6 |
| United Arab Emirates | 3 | 2 | 1 | 262 | 180 | +82 | 5 |
| India | 3 | 1 | 2 | 257 | 237 | +20 | 4 |
| Bangladesh | 3 | 0 | 3 | 152 | 384 | −232 | 3 |

September 11

| South Korea | 153–55 | Bangladesh |
Scoring by half: 82–34, 71–21

GPYW Indoor Stadium, Riyadh

September 11

| United Arab Emirates | 82–65 | India |
Scoring by half: 44–27, 38–38

GPYW Indoor Stadium, Riyadh

September 12

| India | 69–100 | South Korea |
Scoring by half: 35–59, 34–41

GPYW Indoor Stadium, Riyadh

September 12

| Bangladesh | 42–108 | United Arab Emirates |
Scoring by half: 25–48, 17–60

GPYW Indoor Stadium, Riyadh

September 13

| India | 123–55 | Bangladesh |
Scoring by half: 57–33, 66–22

GPYW Indoor Stadium, Riyadh

September 13

| South Korea | 73–72 | United Arab Emirates |
Scoring by half: 44–37, 29–35

GPYW Indoor Stadium, Riyadh

=== Group C ===
| Team | Pld | W | L | PF | PA | PD | Pts |
|---|---|---|---|---|---|---|---|
| Saudi Arabia | 2 | 2 | 0 | 165 | 129 | +36 | 4 |
| Japan | 2 | 1 | 1 | 163 | 139 | +24 | 3 |
| Hong Kong | 2 | 0 | 2 | 116 | 176 | −60 | 2 |

September 11

| Saudi Arabia | 84–58 | Hong Kong |
Scoring by half: 44–26, 40–32

GPYW Indoor Stadium, Riyadh

September 12

| Hong Kong | 58–92 | Japan |
Scoring by half: 20–49, 38–43

GPYW Indoor Stadium, Riyadh

September 13

| Japan | 71–81 | Saudi Arabia |
Scoring by half: 31–40, 40–41

GPYW Indoor Stadium, Riyadh

=== Group D ===
| Team | Pld | W | L | PF | PA | PD | Pts |
|---|---|---|---|---|---|---|---|
| Chinese Taipei | 3 | 3 | 0 | 205 | 168 | +37 | 6 |
| Jordan | 3 | 2 | 1 | 197 | 184 | +13 | 5 |
| Kazakhstan | 3 | 1 | 2 | 226 | 203 | +23 | 4 |
| Indonesia | 3 | 0 | 3 | 176 | 249 | −73 | 3 |

September 11

| Jordan | 66–65 (OT) | Kazakhstan |
Scoring by half: 24–30, 33–27 Overtime: 9–8

GPYW Indoor Stadium, Riyadh

September 11

| Chinese Taipei | 75–50 | Indonesia |
Scoring by half: 36–24, 39–26

GPYW Indoor Stadium, Riyadh

September 12

| Jordan | 60–68 | Chinese Taipei |
Scoring by half: 29–38, 31–30

GPYW Indoor Stadium, Riyadh

September 12

| Indonesia | 75–103 | Kazakhstan |
Scoring by half: 34–53, 41–50

GPYW Indoor Stadium, Riyadh

September 13

| Jordan | 71–51 | Indonesia |
Scoring by half: 32–22, 39–29

GPYW Indoor Stadium, Riyadh

September 13

| Chinese Taipei | 62–58 | Kazakhstan |
Scoring by half: 29–33, 33–25

GPYW Indoor Stadium, Riyadh

== Quarterfinal round ==
=== Group I ===
| Team | Pld | W | L | PF | PA | PD | Pts |
|---|---|---|---|---|---|---|---|
| China | 3 | 3 | 0 | 263 | 178 | +85 | 6 |
| Saudi Arabia | 3 | 2 | 1 | 223 | 220 | +3 | 5 |
| United Arab Emirates | 3 | 1 | 2 | 207 | 232 | −25 | 4 |
| Jordan | 3 | 0 | 3 | 180 | 243 | −63 | 3 |

September 15

| China | 95–62 | Jordan |
Scoring by half: 53–26, 42–36

GPYW Indoor Stadium, Riyadh

September 15

| Saudi Arabia | 90–76 | United Arab Emirates |
Scoring by half: 39–36, 51–40

GPYW Indoor Stadium, Riyadh

September 16

| United Arab Emirates | 54–83 | China |
Scoring by half: 25–42, 29–41

GPYW Indoor Stadium, Riyadh

September 16

| Jordan | 59–71 | Saudi Arabia |
Scoring by half: 26–44, 33–27

GPYW Indoor Stadium, Riyadh

September 17

| United Arab Emirates | 77–59 | Jordan |
Scoring by half: 37–28, 40–31

GPYW Indoor Stadium, Riyadh

September 17

| China | 85–62 | Saudi Arabia |
Scoring by half: 52–27, 33–35

GPYW Indoor Stadium, Riyadh

=== Group II ===
| Team | Pld | W | L | PF | PA | PD | Pts | Tiebreaker |
|---|---|---|---|---|---|---|---|---|
| Japan | 3 | 2 | 1 | 265 | 251 | +14 | 5 | 1–0 |
| South Korea | 3 | 2 | 1 | 282 | 245 | +37 | 5 | 0–1 |
| Chinese Taipei | 3 | 1 | 2 | 217 | 235 | −18 | 4 | 1–0 |
| Iran | 3 | 1 | 2 | 233 | 266 | −33 | 4 | 0–1 |

September 15

| Iran | 54–72 | Chinese Taipei |
Scoring by half: 19–29, 35–43

GPYW Indoor Stadium, Riyadh

September 15

| Japan | 89–83 | South Korea |
Scoring by half: 38–38, 51–45

GPYW Indoor Stadium, Riyadh

September 16

| South Korea | 103–85 | Iran |
Scoring by half: 50–44, 53–41

GPYW Indoor Stadium, Riyadh

September 16

| Chinese Taipei | 74–85 | Japan |
Scoring by half: 39–42, 35–43

GPYW Indoor Stadium, Riyadh

September 17

| Iran | 94–91 | Japan |
Scoring by half: 44–40, 50–51

GPYW Indoor Stadium, Riyadh

September 17

| South Korea | 96–71 | Chinese Taipei |
Scoring by half: 53–34, 43–37

GPYW Indoor Stadium, Riyadh

=== Group III ===
| Team | Pld | W | L | PF | PA | PD | Pts |
|---|---|---|---|---|---|---|---|
| Bahrain | 3 | 3 | 0 | 264 | 176 | +88 | 6 |
| Indonesia | 3 | 2 | 1 | 266 | 186 | +80 | 5 |
| Hong Kong | 3 | 1 | 2 | 236 | 223 | +13 | 4 |
| Bangladesh | 3 | 0 | 3 | 137 | 318 | −181 | 3 |

September 15

| Bahrain | 76–68 | Indonesia |
Scoring by half: 42–28, 34–40

GPYW Indoor Stadium, Riyadh

September 15

| Hong Kong | 95–60 | Bangladesh |
Scoring by half: 51–26, 44–34

GPYW Indoor Stadium, Riyadh

September 16

| Bangladesh | 39–109 | Bahrain |
Scoring by half: 21–58, 18–51

GPYW Indoor Stadium, Riyadh

September 16

| Indonesia | 84–72 | Hong Kong |
Scoring by half: 43–49, 41–23

GPYW Indoor Stadium, Riyadh

September 17

| Indonesia | 114–38 | Bangladesh |
Scoring by half: 58–22, 56–16

GPYW Indoor Stadium, Riyadh

September 17

| Bahrain | 79–69 | Hong Kong |
Scoring by half: 48–41, 31–28

GPYW Indoor Stadium, Riyadh

=== Group IV ===
| Team | Pld | W | L | PF | PA | PD | Pts |
|---|---|---|---|---|---|---|---|
| Philippines | 2 | 2 | 0 | 173 | 143 | +30 | 4 |
| India | 2 | 1 | 1 | 156 | 172 | −16 | 3 |
| Kazakhstan | 2 | 0 | 2 | 157 | 171 | −14 | 2 |

September 15

| Philippines | 84–74 | Kazakhstan |
Scoring by half: 37–41, 47–33

GPYW Indoor Stadium, Riyadh

September 16

| India | 69–89 | Philippines |
Scoring by half: 25–45, 44–44

GPYW Indoor Stadium, Riyadh

September 17

| Kazakhstan | 83–87 | India |
Scoring by half: 42–46, 41–41

GPYW Indoor Stadium, Riyadh

== Classification 5th–14th ==
=== 13th place ===
September 18

| Hong Kong | 68–100 | Kazakhstan |
Scoring by half: 35–43, 33–57

GPYW Indoor Stadium, Riyadh

=== 11th place ===
September 18

| Indonesia | 0–20 | India |
Walkover

GPYW Indoor Stadium, Riyadh

=== 9th place ===
September 18

| Bahrain | 79–84 | Philippines |
Scoring by half: 41–46, 38–38

GPYW Indoor Stadium, Riyadh

=== 7th place ===
September 19

| Jordan | 71–62 | Iran |
Scoring by half: 36–22, 35–40

GPYW Indoor Stadium, Riyadh

=== 5th place ===
September 19

| United Arab Emirates | 78–62 | Chinese Taipei |
Scoring by half: 35–27, 43–35

GPYW Indoor Stadium, Riyadh

== Final round ==
Semifinals
September 18
China | 72
South Korea | 86
September 18
Saudi Arabia | 92
Japan | 108

Final
September 19
South Korea | 78
Japan | 76
3rd place
September 19
China | 94
Saudi Arabia | 68

=== Semifinals ===
September 18

| China | 72–86 | South Korea |
Scoring by half: 42–36, 30–50

GPYW Indoor Stadium, Riyadh

September 18

| Saudi Arabia | 92–108 | Japan |
Scoring by half: 43–51, 49–57

GPYW Indoor Stadium, Riyadh

=== 3rd place ===
September 19

| Saudi Arabia | 68–94 | China |
Scoring by half: 30–48, 38–46

GPYW Indoor Stadium, Riyadh

=== Final ===
September 19

| South Korea | 78–76 | Japan |
Scoring by half: 41–44, 37–32

GPYW Indoor Stadium, Riyadh

== Final standings ==
| Qualified for the 1998 FIBA World Championship |

| Rank | Team | Record |
|---|---|---|
| 1st place, gold medalist(s) | South Korea | 7–1 |
| 2nd place, silver medalist(s) | Japan | 4–3 |
| 3rd place, bronze medalist(s) | China | 7–1 |
| 4 | Saudi Arabia | 4–3 |
| 5 | United Arab Emirates | 4–3 |
| 6 | Chinese Taipei | 4–3 |
| 7 | Jordan | 3–4 |
| 8 | Iran | 3–4 |
| 9 | Philippines | 3–3 |
| 10 | Bahrain | 4–3 |
| 11 | India | 3–3 |
| 12 | Indonesia | 2–5 |
| 13 | Kazakhstan | 2–4 |
| 14 | Hong Kong | 1–5 |
| 15 | Bangladesh | 0–6 |

== Awards ==
1997 Asian champions

South Korea
Second title

- Most Valuable Player: (South Korea) Chun Hee-Chul
- Best Scorer: (Bahrain) Abdulmajeed Ali
- Best Playmaker: (South Korea) Kang Dong-Hee
- Best 3-Pointer: (Kazakhstan) Alexey Yeropkin
- Best Coach: (South Korea) Kim Dong-Kwang
- Sportsmanship Award: (Philippines) Romel Adducul
