= GPYW Indoor Stadium =

- Interactive map of GPYW Indoor Stadium
- Full name: General Presidency of Youth Welfare Indoor Stadium
- Location: Riyadh, Saudi Arabia
- Coordinates: 24°39′37″N 46°43′34″E
- Capacity: 5,000

Tenant
- Al-Hilal

GPYW Indoor Stadium is an indoor sporting arena located in Riyadh, Saudi Arabia. The capacity of the arena is 5,000 spectators. It hosts indoor sporting events such as basketball and hosts the home matches of Al-Hilal. It also hosted the Asian Basketball Confederation Championship 1997 championship.

It hosted the official 1997 Asian Basketball Championship where Saudi Arabia's national basketball team finished in the Final Four.
