= United Arab Emirates men's national under-18 basketball team =

United Arab Emirates
- FIBA zone: FIBA Asia
- National federation: United Arab Emirates Basketball Association

U19 World Cup
- Appearances: None

U18 Asia Cup
- Appearances: 4
- Medals: None

The United Arab Emirates men's national under-18 basketball team is a national basketball team of the United Arab Emirates, administered by the United Arab Emirates Basketball Association. It represents the country in international under-18 men's basketball competitions.

== FIBA Under-18 Asia Cup participations ==
Year	Result
1980	17th
1982	14th
2008	14th
2018	16th

== See also ==
- United Arab Emirates men's national basketball team
- United Arab Emirates men's national under-17 basketball team
