= United Arab Emirates men's national basketball team =

Men's national basketball team representing the United Arab Emirates

United Arab Emirates
- FIBA ranking: 104 ▲7 (1 September 2026)
- Joined FIBA: 1976
- FIBA zone: FIBA Asia
- National federation: United Arab Emirates Basketball Association
- Coach: Mounir Ben Slimane
- Nickname(s): Al Abyad (The White One); Eyal Zayed (Sons of Zayed)

FIBA World Cup
- Appearances: None

FIBA Asia Cup
- Appearances: 8
- Medals: None
Home	Away

First international
- United Arab Emirates 121–44 North Yemen (New Delhi, India; 20 November 1982)

Biggest win
- United Arab Emirates 121–44 North Yemen (New Delhi, India; 20 November 1982)

Biggest defeat
- Lebanon 108–38 United Arab Emirates (Tianjin, China; 7 August 2009)

The United Arab Emirates men's national basketball team (Arabic: منتخب الإمارات العربية المتحدة لكرة السلة) represents the United Arab Emirates in international basketball. They are controlled by the United Arab Emirates Basketball Association.

The UAE made its debut in international competition at the 1982 Asian Games. Furthermore, the national team has qualified to the FIBA Asia Cup eight times, with their best result coming in 1997, where they finished fifth. The UAE has also competed at the Arab Nations Cup multiple times, where they had their top performance in 1997, winning bronze.

== History ==
The United Arab Emirates played in their first international match at the 1982 Asian Games. The group stage fixture win against North Yemen, was one of only two victories for the team against four losses during the event; which saw the team miss out on making it to the medal round. After the tournament, the team would not appear at an international competition until the 1990 Asian Games, where the team would only achieve modest results.

Three years later, the United Arab Emirates made their debut at the top continental competition, the 1993 FIBA Asia Cup. Placed into Group B during the preliminary phase, the UAE won two out of their three matches for a record of (2–1) to advance into the quarter-finals. However, the UAE would lose a narrowly contested match against Iran 73–77, to relegate the team to the classification rounds to finish out the tournament. After nearly reaching the semi-finals at the first FIBA Asia Cup tournament the UAE took part in, the team was back at the next edition of the event in 1995. Stationed in Group B once again, the UAE, however, would only win one of their preliminary phase matches; which came against the Philippines 70–56, to be sent to the classification stages for the second straight tournament. There, the team would pickup four more victories to close out the competition in ninth place.

Behind subpar performances at their first two FIBA Asia Cup competitions, the United Arab Emirates entered the tournament in 1997, determined to gain better results. After completely dominating India, and Bangladesh in their first two preliminary phase matches, the team fell in a close defeat to South Korea 73–72. Although with the two wins, the team automatically advanced into the quarter-final round. Entering the phase, the UAE would only prevail in one of their three matches, a 77–59 win against Jordan. The loss for the team would send them into the classification fifth place game, where they would earn one more victory to end the competition. After the tournament, the UAE would make the competition five more times over the next 14 years through the 2011 edition, accumulating only disappointing outcomes.

== Competitive record ==
=== FIBA World Cup ===
World Cup					Qualification			
Year	Position	Pld	W	L	Yr	Pld	W	L
1950 to 1970	Part of United Kingdom				Part of United Kingdom			
(Puerto Rico) 1974	Not a FIBA member				Not a FIBA member			
(Philippines) 1978	Did not enter				Did not enter			
(Colombia) 1982	Did not enter				Did not enter			
(Spain) 1986	Did not enter				Did not enter			
(Argentina) 1990	Did not enter				Did not enter			
(Canada) 1994	Did not qualify				FIBA Asia Cup served as qualifiers			
(Greece) 1998	Did not qualify				FIBA Asia Cup served as qualifiers			
(United States) 2002	Did not qualify				FIBA Asia Cup served as qualifiers			
(Japan) 2006	Did not qualify				FIBA Asia Cup served as qualifiers			
(Turkey) 2010	Did not qualify				FIBA Asia Cup served as qualifiers			
(Spain) 2014	Did not qualify				FIBA Asia Cup served as qualifiers			
(China) 2019	Did not enter				Did not enter			
(Philippines) (Japan) (Indonesia) 2023	Did not enter				Did not enter			
(Qatar) 2027	Did not enter				Did not enter			
(France) 2031	To be determined				To be determined			
Total	0/13							

=== Asian Games ===
Asian Games
Year	Position	Pld	W	L
1951 to 1970	Part of United Kingdom			
(Iran) 1974	Not an IOC member			
(Thailand) 1978	Not an IOC member			
(India) 1982	11th	6	2	4
(South Korea) 1986	Did not enter			
(China) 1990	6th	5	1	4
(Japan) 1994	9th	4	0	4
(Thailand) 1998	8th	6	1	5
(South Korea) 2002	11th	5	1	4
(Qatar) 2006	13th	2	1	1
(China) 2010	Did not enter			
(South Korea) 2014	Did not enter			
(Indonesia) 2018	Did not enter			
(China) 2022	13th	3	0	3
(Japan) 2026	Did not enter			
Total	7/12	31	6	25

=== FIBA Asia Cup ===
Asia Cup					Qualification			
Year	Position	Pld	W	L	Yr	Pld	W	L
1960 to 1971	Part of United Kingdom				Part of United Kingdom			
(Philippines) 1973	Not a FIBA Asia member				Not a FIBA Asia member			
(Thailand) 1975	Not a FIBA Asia member				Not a FIBA Asia member			
(Malaysia) 1977	Did not enter				No qualifiers were held			
(Japan) 1979	Did not enter				No qualifiers were held			
(India) 1981	Did not enter				No qualifiers were held			
(Hong Kong) 1983	Did not enter				No qualifiers were held			
(Malaysia) 1985	Did not enter				No qualifiers were held			
(Thailand) 1987	Did not enter				No qualifiers were held			
(China) 1989	Did not enter				No qualifiers were held			
(Japan) 1991	Did not enter				No qualifiers were held			
(Indonesia) 1993	8th	6	2	4	Direct qualification			
(South Korea) 1995	9th	7	5	2	Direct qualification			
(Saudi Arabia) 1997	5th	7	4	3	Direct qualification			
(Japan) 1999	10th	7	4	3	Direct qualification			
(China) 2001	10th	6	3	3	Direct qualification			
(China) 2003	Did not enter				Withdrew			
(Qatar) 2005	Did not qualify				2005	5	1	4
(Japan) 2007	16th	7	1	6	2007	5	3	2
(China) 2009	12th	8	1	7	2009	4	2	2
(China) 2011	10th	8	2	6	2011	3	1	2
(Philippines) 2013	Did not qualify				2013	4	1	3
(China) 2015	Did not qualify				2015	5	1	4
(Lebanon) 2017	Did not qualify				2017	4	2	2
(Indonesia) 2022	Did not qualify				2022	6	3	3
(Saudi Arabia) 2025	Did not qualify				2025	13	5	8
2029	To be determined				2029	In progress		
Total	8/23	56	22	34		49	19	30

== Results and fixtures ==
Win Loss

=== 2026 ===
26 August 2029 FIBA Asia Cup pre-qualifiers – 1st round	United Arab Emirates	110–64	Nepal	Dubai, United Arab Emirates
17:00 (UTC+4)	Scoring by quarter: 27–14, 30–15, 31–14, 22–21
	Pts: Al-Ameri 23; Rebs: A. Al-Breiki 10; Asts: Dickerson 7	Boxscore	Pts: Maharjan 24; Rebs: Shrestha 8 Asts: Shah 5	Arena: Sheikh Saeed Bin Maktoum Sports Hall; Attendance: 100; Referees: Ahmad Al-Yousef (JOR), Chang-Jen Ho (TPE), Yana Nikogossyan (KAZ)

27 August 2029 FIBA Asia Cup pre-qualifiers – 1st round	Kuwait	72–75	United Arab Emirates	Dubai, United Arab Emirates
20:00 (UTC+4)	Scoring by quarter: 20–17, 16–26, 17–15, 19–17
	Pts: Hasan 19; Rebs: Hasan 16; Asts: Alshemmari, Hasan 4	Boxscore	Pts: Dickerson 27; Rebs: Al-Zaabi 8 Asts: Dickerson 7	Arena: Sheikh Saeed Bin Maktoum Sports Hall; Attendance: 350; Referees: Ahmad Al-Yousef (JOR), Rakesh Ramalingaiah (IND), Chang-Jen Ho (TPE)

28 August 2029 FIBA Asia Cup pre-qualifiers – 1st round	United Arab Emirates	80–83	Bahrain	Dubai, United Arab Emirates
20:00 (UTC+4)	Scoring by quarter: 16–26, 22–5, 19–22, 23–30
	Pts: Dickerson 27; Rebs: Al-Shabebi 10; Asts: Dickerson 4	Boxscore	Pts: Rashed 28; Rebs: Sampson 14; Asts: Rashed 5	Arena: Sheikh Saeed Bin Maktoum Sports Hall; Attendance: 300; Referees: Mohammed Ismail Al-Tarawneh (JOR), Ahmad Al-Yousef (JOR), Hum Zhung Liang (MAS)

30 August 2029 FIBA Asia Cup pre-qualifiers – 1st round	Oman	89–115	United Arab Emirates	Dubai, United Arab Emirates
20:00 (UTC+4)	Scoring by quarter: 17–42, 28–20, 25–26, 19–27
	Pts: Al-Shaaibi 24; Rebs: Bakhit 10; Asts: Al-Riyami 6	Boxscore	Pts: Al-Ameri 42; Rebs: A. Al-Breiki, Dickerson 7 Asts: Dickerson 14	Arena: Sheikh Saeed Bin Maktoum Sports Hall; Attendance: 100; Referees: Ahmad Al-Yousef (JOR), Mohammed Ismail Al-Tarawneh (JOR), Rakesh Ramalingaiah (IND)

27 November 2029 FIBA Asia Cup pre-qualifiers – 2nd round	Palestine	vs.	United Arab Emirates	Zouk Mikael, Lebanon
20:00 (UTC+2)
		Boxscore		Arena: Nouhad Naufal Stadium

28 November 2029 FIBA Asia Cup pre-qualifiers – 2nd round	United Arab Emirates	vs.	Sri Lanka	Zouk Mikael, Lebanon
13:00 (UTC+2)
		Boxscore		Arena: Nouhad Naufal Stadium

30 November 2029 FIBA Asia Cup pre-qualifiers – 2nd round	Kazakhstan	vs.	United Arab Emirates	Zouk Mikael, Lebanon
17:00 (UTC+2)
		Boxscore		Arena: Nouhad Naufal Stadium

== Team ==
=== Current roster ===
Roster for the 2029 FIBA Asia Cup Pre-Qualifiers matches in August 2026.

United Arab Emirates men's national basketball team roster
Players
Coaches

Pos.	No.	Name	Age – Date of birth	Height	Club	Ctr.
PG	0	Rashed Mohammad	28 – 12 February 1998	1.85 m (6 ft 1 in)	Al-Nasr	(United Arab Emirates)
PG	1	Mohamed Al-Hashmi	25 – 26 July 2001	1.89 m (6 ft 2 in)	Sharjah	(United Arab Emirates)
F/C	2	Ahmed Al-Breiki	31 – 30 October 1994	2.00 m (6 ft 7 in)	Sharjah	(United Arab Emirates)
F	8	Saif Al-Rashidi	21 – 14 August 2005	1.95 m (6 ft 5 in)	Al Wasl	(United Arab Emirates)
C	10	Omer Al-Ameri	34 – 18 November 1991	2.05 m (6 ft 9 in)	Shabab Al Ahli	(United Arab Emirates)
SG	11	Rashed Al-Zaabi	37 – 19 October 1988	1.85 m (6 ft 1 in)	Sharjah	(United Arab Emirates)
F/C	13	Mamadou N'Diaye	33 – 14 February 1993	2.10 m (6 ft 11 in)	Al-Nasr	(United Arab Emirates)
C	15	Jasem Al-Maazmi (C)	37 – 24 November 1988	2.05 m (6 ft 9 in)	Al Bataeh	(United Arab Emirates)
PG	21	Hamad Al-Blooshi	26 – 22 February 2000	1.85 m (6 ft 1 in)	Al-Nasr	(United Arab Emirates)
G/F	22	DeMarco Dickerson	29 – 18 August 1997	1.96 m (6 ft 5 in)	Sharjah	(United Arab Emirates)
C	23	Qais Al-Shabebi	34 – 31 October 1991	2.00 m (6 ft 7 in)	Shabab Al Ahli	(United Arab Emirates)
F	77	Abdulaziz Ahmad	22 – 21 April 2004	1.85 m (6 ft 1 in)	Al Wasl	(United Arab Emirates)

Head coach

- (Tunisia) Mounir Ben Slimane

Assistant coach(es)

- (United Arab Emirates) Salem Al-Dhaheri
- (United Arab Emirates) Jassim Al-Blooshi

Legend

- (C) Team captain
- Club – describes last
  club before the competition
- Age – describes age
  on 26 August 2026

=== Depth chart ===
Pos.	Starting 5	Bench 1	Bench 2
C	Qais Al-Shabebi	Mamadou N'Diaye
PF	Jasem Al-Maazmi	Ahmed Al-Breiki
SF	Abdulaziz Ahmad	Saif Al-Rashidi	Rashed Al-Zaabi
SG	Omer Al-Ameri	Rashed Mohammad
PG	DeMarco Dickerson	Mohamed Al-Hashmi	Hamad Al-Blooshi

== Head coach position ==
- (Tunisia) Mounir Ben Slimane – (2005–2009)
- (Bosnia and Herzegovina) Zoran Zubčević – (2010–2015)
- (Tunisia) Mounir Ben Slimane – (2016–present)

== Past rosters ==
2011 FIBA Asia Cup: finished 10th among 16 teams

United Arab Emirates men's national basketball team – 2011 FIBA Asia Cup roster
Players
Coaches

Pos.	No.	Name	Age – Date of birth	Height	Club	Ctr.
G	4	Jassim Haji	30 – 22 March 1981	1.84 m (6 ft 0 in)	Shabab Al Ahli	(United Arab Emirates)
SG	5	Mohamed Al-Breiki	19 – 21 December 1991	1.87 m (6 ft 2 in)	Shabab Al Ahli	(United Arab Emirates)
G/F	6	Ibrahim Ahmad	28 – 12 September 1983	1.96 m (6 ft 5 in)	Al Wasl	(United Arab Emirates)
G	7	Ibrahim Al-Sari	31 – 4 July 1980	1.84 m (6 ft 0 in)	Al Nasr	(United Arab Emirates)
PG	8	Hussain Ahmed	22 – 6 March 1989	1.80 m (5 ft 11 in)	Shabab Al Ahli	(United Arab Emirates)
PG	9	Khalifa Salem	20 – 25 August 1991	1.80 m (5 ft 11 in)	Shabab Al Ahli	(United Arab Emirates)
F	10	Rashid Al-Ali	21 – 3 April 1990	1.95 m (6 ft 5 in)	Sharjah	(United Arab Emirates)
G	11	Rashed Al-Zaabi	22 – 19 October 1988	1.85 m (6 ft 1 in)	Al Wasl	(United Arab Emirates)
F/C	12	Qais Al-Shabebi	19 – 31 October 1991	2.00 m (6 ft 7 in)	Shabab Al Ahli	(United Arab Emirates)
F	13	Malallah Banihammad	28 – 18 June 1983	1.98 m (6 ft 6 in)	Sharjah	(United Arab Emirates)
C	14	Ali Al Hattawi	31 – 20 November 1979	2.00 m (6 ft 7 in)	Shabab Al Ahli	(United Arab Emirates)
C	15	Jasim Abdalla	22 – 24 November 1988	2.05 m (6 ft 9 in)	Sharjah	(United Arab Emirates)

Head coach

- (Bosnia and Herzegovina) Zoran Zubčević

Legend

- (C) Team captain
- Club – describes last
  club before the competition
- Age – describes age
  on 24 September 2011

== See also ==
- Sport in United Arab Emirates
- United Arab Emirates men's national under-18 basketball team
- United Arab Emirates men's national under-17 basketball team
- UAE National Basketball League
