= Hiroyuki Tominaga =

Japanese basketball player

Personal information
- Born: October 7, 1973 (age 53) Kyoto
- Listed height: 6 ft 11 in (2.11 m)
- Listed weight: 231 lb (105 kg)

Career information
- High school: Rakunan
- College: Nihon University

Career history
- 1996–2006: Mitsubishi Electric
Medals
Men's basketball
Representing Japan
Summer Universiade
Silver medal – second place	1995 Fukuoka	Japan

Hiroyuki Tominaga (富永 啓之, Tominaga Hiroyuki; born 7 October 1973) is a former Japanese basketball player.

He is the father of Keisei Tominaga, who plays for the Nebraska Cornhuskers and was a member of the Japan men's national basketball team.
