= 2018 FIBA U18 Asian Championship =

25th FIBA Under-18 Asian Basketball Championship

Tournament details
- Host country: Thailand
- City: Nonthaburi
- Dates: 5–11 August
- Teams: 16 (from 2 confederations)
- Venue(s): 2 (in 2 host cities)

Final positions
- Champions: Australia (1st title)
- Runners-up: New Zealand
- Third place: China

Tournament statistics
- Top scorer: (South Korea) Lee H.J. (26.0)
- Top rebounds: (China) Wang Q.Z. (13.0)
- Top assists: (South Korea) Lee H.J. (6.0)
- PPG (Team): South Korea (103.3)
- RPG (Team): Australia (56.8)
- APG (Team): South Korea (22.0)

Official website
- www.fiba.basketball/history

The 2018 FIBA U18 Asian Championship was the 25th edition of the Asian basketball championship for under-18 men. The tournament was held in Nonthaburi, Thailand from 5 to 11 August 2018.

Australia held off New Zealand, 72−63, to win their first-ever Under-18 Asian title in their debut, while China avenged their Preliminary Round loss to the Philippines, 76−57, to secure third place in the final day of competition. The top four teams qualified and will represent FIBA Asia in the 2019 FIBA Under-19 Basketball World Cup in Greece.

== Qualification ==
=== Allocation of berths ===
According to FIBA Asia rules, the number of participating teams in the FIBA U18 Asian Championship was set at 16. The hosts and the defending champions qualified automatically. All FIBA Asia subzones got two berths each, except for the Central and South Asian subzones, which got one berth each. FIBA Oceania got two berths. The last two berths were allocated to subzones based on their teams' results in the 2016 FIBA Asia Under-18 Championship.

Allocation of berths
Subzone	Automatic qualifiers		Default berths	Additional berths as 2nd–3rd place teams from last championship	Total
Subzone	Hosts	Defending champions	Default berths	Additional berths as 2nd–3rd place teams from last championship	Total
Central Asia	0	0	1	0	1
East Asia	0	0	2	2	4
Gulf	0	0	2	0	2
South Asia	0	0	1	0	1
Southeast Asia	1	0	2	0	3
West Asia	0	1	2	0	3
FIBA Oceania	0	—	2	—	2
Total	1	1	12	2	16

=== Qualified teams ===
- Central Asia (1)
  - Kazakhstan
- East Asia (4)
  - China
  - Chinese Taipei
  - Japan
  - South Korea
- Gulf (2)
  - Bahrain
  - United Arab Emirates
- South Asia (1)
  - India
- Southeast Asia (3)
  - Thailand (hosts)
  - Philippines
  - Indonesia
- West Asia (3)
  - Iran (defending champions)
  - Lebanon
  - Syria
- FIBA Oceania (2)
  - Australia
  - New Zealand

== Format ==
This edition of the tournament will be using a different format as compared to what was used since 2010. While there would still be a preliminary round robin of four groups of four teams, the single-elimination final round immediately follows the preliminary round. In the final round, the teams that finished second and third in their respective groups would play in the qualifications to quarterfinals of the final round, while the group winners automatically qualify to the quarterfinals proper.

== Draw ==
Prior to the draw, the 16 teams were separated into 4 pots based on the latest FIBA Boys' World Ranking, as shown within the parenthesis.

Pot 1	Pot 2	Pot 3	Pot 4
Australia (9); China (12); South Korea (16); Iran (26)	Japan (27); Chinese Taipei (31); New Zealand (33); Philippines (34)	Lebanon (43); India (48); Kazakhstan (52); Bahrain (60)	Syria (62); Thailand (67); Indonesia (71); United Arab Emirates (82)

The Draw ceremony was held on July 6 at Mono 29 Stadium in Nonthaburi, Thailand. Teams in each pot were distributed into four groups, with the host nation picking their group. Thailand eventually decided to be drawn in Group C, along with Bahrain and newcomers Australia & New Zealand.

Group A	Group B	Group C	Group D
Iran; Japan; Kazakhstan; Indonesia	China; Philippines; Lebanon; United Arab Emirates	Australia; New Zealand; Bahrain; Thailand	South Korea; Chinese Taipei; India; Syria

== Venues ==
Most games were held at Stadium 29, located in the Bangkok suburb of Nonthaburi. A few games were held at the Thai-Japanese Bangkok Youth Center in Bangkok.

== Preliminary round ==
All times are local (UTC+7).

=== Group A ===
Pos	Team	Pld	W	L	PF	PA	PD	Pts	Qualification
1	Iran	3	3	0	237	168	+69	6	Quarterfinals
2	Japan	3	2	1	238	164	+74	5	Playoffs
3	Indonesia	3	1	2	182	230	−48	4	Playoffs
4	Kazakhstan	3	0	3	158	253	−95	3	Eliminated

Source: FIBA Asia
Rules for classification: 1) Points; 2) Head-to-head results; 3) Points difference; 4) Points scored.

5 August 2018
10:00

Report

Iran	80–50	Indonesia
Scoring by quarter: 22–18, 23–7, 22–16, 13–9
Pts: Kashani 16; Rebs: Darvish Nezhad 9 Asts: 4 players 3		Pts: Rachman 12; Rebs: Gosal 9 Asts: Michael 6

Stadium 29, Nonthaburi
Referees: Kim Cheong-soo (KOR), Chang Lu-yueh (TPE), Suebpong Wichaiphin (THA)

5 August 2018
12:15

Report

Japan	88–40	Kazakhstan
Scoring by quarter: 19–6, 17–8, 26–13, 26–13
Pts: Tominaga 23; Rebs: Nakamura, Yokochi 6 Asts: Kawamura, Yokochi 5		Pts: Verzun 13; Rebs: Kushniruk 7 Asts: Kairoshev, Romanenko 1

Stadium 29, Nonthaburi
Referees: Matthew Ryan Bathurst (NZL), Toni Caldwell (AUS), Wissam Zein (SYR)

6 August 2018
10:30

Report

Kazakhstan	54–86	Iran
Scoring by quarter: 14–32, 20–23, 9–15, 11–16
Pts: Shakirov 21; Rebs: Kushniruk 8 Asts: Shakirov 4		Pts: Rezaeifar 17; Rebs: Rezaeifar 14; Asts: Dalirzahan 4

Thai-Japanese Bangkok Youth Center, Bangkok
Referees: Nattapong Jontapa (THA), Chang Lu-yueh (TPE), Matthew Ryan Bathurst (NZL)

6 August 2018
12:45

Report

Indonesia	53–86	Japan
Scoring by quarter: 11–17, 11–23, 22–27, 9–19
Pts: Rachman 14; Rebs: Gosal 11; Asts: Widyadana, Lensun 2		Pts: Tominaga 17; Rebs: Iio 7 Asts: Nakata 7

Thai-Japanese Bangkok Youth Center, Bangkok
Referees: Wissam Zein (SYR), Kim Cheong-soo (KOR), Adel Mohamed Ghuloom (BHR)

7 August 2018
10:30

Report

Kazakhstan	64–79	Indonesia
Scoring by quarter: 20–18, 21–19, 11–16, 12–26
Pts: Uapov 21; Rebs: Fomichyov, Shakirov 10; Asts: Romanenko 5		Pts: Michael 26; Rebs: Michael 10; Asts: Rachman 3

Thai-Japanese Bangkok Youth Center, Bangkok
Referees: Nattapong Jontapa (THA), Kim Cheong-soo (KOR), Rakesh Ramalingaiah (IND)

7 August 2018
12:45

Report

Iran	71–64	Japan
Scoring by quarter: 16–13, 17–18, 21–18, 17–15
Pts: Arabzadeh 14; Rebs: Rezaeifar 12; Asts: Arabzadeh 5		Pts: Nakamura 17; Rebs: Asai 5 Asts: Mitani 4

Stadium 29, Nonthaburi
Referees: Lee Kyoung-hwan (KOR), Sung Ming-lu (TPE), Matthew Ryan Bathurst (NZL)

=== Group B ===
Pos	Team	Pld	W	L	PF	PA	PD	Pts	Qualification
1	Philippines	3	3	0	240	165	+75	6	Quarterfinals
2	China	3	2	1	281	152	+129	5	Playoffs
3	Lebanon	3	1	2	189	232	−43	4	Playoffs
4	United Arab Emirates	3	0	3	133	294	−161	3	Eliminated

Source: FIBA Asia
Rules for classification: 1) Points; 2) Head-to-head results; 3) Points difference; 4) Points scored.

5 August 2018
17:45

Report

China	118–27	United Arab Emirates
Scoring by quarter: 30–8, 36–6, 27–0, 25–13
Pts: Wang Q.Z. 24; Rebs: Wang Y.Z., Wang Q.Z. 9 Asts: Xu, Guo H.W. 6		Pts: Hussein 10; Rebs: Hussein 8 Asts: Albloushi 3

Stadium 29, Nonthaburi
Referees: Nattapong Jontapa (THA), Rakesh Ramalingaiah (IND), Vanessa Ann Devlin (AUS)

5 August 2018
20:00

Report

Philippines	75–53	Lebanon
Scoring by quarter: 25–15, 16–18, 18–8, 16–12
Pts: Ildefonso 19; Rebs: Edu 12; Asts: Panopio 6		Pts: Zanbaka 12; Rebs: Khayat 9 Asts: Khoueiry 3

Stadium 29, Nonthaburi
Referees: Lee Kyoung-hwan (KOR), Sung Ming-lu (TPE), Adel Mohamed Ghuloom (BHR)

6 August 2018
15:30

Report

Lebanon	52–100	China
Scoring by quarter: 9–23, 11–31, 9–28, 23–18
Pts: Bedikian 10; Rebs: Kasab, Zanbaka 7 Asts: Saade, Dargham, Mougharbel 2		Pts: Wang Q.Z. 19; Rebs: Guo H.W., Wang Q.Z. 9 Asts: Xu 7

Thai-Japanese Bangkok Youth Center, Bangkok
Referees: Harja Jaladri (INA), Toni Caldwell (AUS), Rakesh Ramalingaiah (IND)

6 August 2018
17:45

Report

United Arab Emirates	49–92	Philippines
Scoring by quarter: 14–29, 17–21, 13–19, 5–23
Pts: Alhashmi 18; Rebs: Alblooshi 5 Asts: Albloushi, Albreiki 2		Pts: Edu 16; Rebs: Cortez 13; Asts: Panopio, Abadiano 5

Thai-Japanese Bangkok Youth Center, Bangkok
Referees: Lee Kyoung-hwan (KOR), Sung Ming-lu (TPE), Vanessa Ann Devlin (AUS)

7 August 2018
15:30

Report

Lebanon	84–57	United Arab Emirates
Scoring by quarter: 21–12, 16–25, 20–11, 27–9
Pts: Zanbaka 21; Rebs: Zanbaka 14; Asts: Bedikian 6		Pts: Hussein 15; Rebs: Hussein 10; Asts: Albreiki 5

Thai-Japanese Bangkok Youth Center, Bangkok
Referees: Chang Lu-yueh (TPE), Adel Mohamed Ghuloom (BHR), Chitchanok Srisawat (THA)

7 August 2018
17:45

Report

China	63–73	Philippines
Scoring by quarter: 15–18, 12–13, 12–23, 24–19
Pts: Guo H.W. 24; Rebs: Wang Q.Z. 11; Asts: Xu 4		Pts: Ildefonso 18; Rebs: Edu 14; Asts: Oczon 3

Stadium 29, Nonthaburi
Referees: Wissam Zein (SYR), Toni Caldwell (AUS), Suebpong Wichaiphin (THA)

=== Group C ===
Pos	Team	Pld	W	L	PF	PA	PD	Pts	Qualification
1	Australia	3	3	0	337	148	+189	6	Quarterfinals
2	New Zealand	3	2	1	245	220	+25	5	Playoffs
3	Bahrain	3	1	2	191	272	−81	4	Playoffs
4	Thailand (H)	3	0	3	162	295	−133	3	Eliminated

Source: FIBA Asia
Rules for classification: 1) Points; 2) Head-to-head results; 3) Points difference; 4) Points scored.
(H) Hosts

5 August 2018
12:45

Report

New Zealand	94–62	Bahrain
Scoring by quarter: 35–15, 22–13, 18–12, 19–22
Pts: de Geest 19; Rebs: Darling 11; Asts: Oswald, de Geest, Cameron 3		Pts: A. Rashed 11; Rebs: Dindayneh 6 Asts: Dindayneh 2

Thai-Japanese Bangkok Youth Center, Bangkok
Referees: Mohammadreza Salehian (IRI), Zhang Lei (CHN), Yuli Wullandari (INA)

5 August 2018
15:30

Report

Australia	119–44	Thailand
Scoring by quarter: 28–9, 25–10, 33–19, 33–16
Pts: Krause 19; Rebs: Bowen, Dalton, Froling 11; Asts: Wigness 6		Pts: Thitikhunrat 9 Rebs: Inmaphan 4 Asts: Boateng 2

Stadium 29, Nonthaburi
Referees: Rabah Noujaim (LBN), Zhang Xiao (CHN), Saif Al-Dossari (QAT)

6 August 2018
10:30

Report

Bahrain	42–107	Australia
Scoring by quarter: 11–25, 15–25, 7–29, 9–28
Pts: Hamoda, Nawaf 8 Rebs: Aboukuora 5 Asts: Hamoda 3		Pts: Froling 21; Rebs: Leaupepe 12; Asts: Lee 5

Stadium 29, Nonthaburi
Referees: Ricor Buaron (PHI), Yasuhisa Masubuchi (JPN), Yuli Wullandari (INA)

6 August 2018
15:30

Report

Thailand	47–89	New Zealand
Scoring by quarter: 10–18, 13–22, 10–35, 14–14
Pts: Janchai 8 Rebs: Jaimsawad 5 Asts: Wadman 4		Pts: Mennenga 18; Rebs: Perrott-Hunt 12; Asts: Cameron 4

Stadium 29, Nonthaburi
Referees: Mohammadreza Salehian (IRI), Zhang Lei(CHN), Saif Al-Dossari (QAT)

7 August 2018
10:30

Report

Australia	111–62	New Zealand
Scoring by quarter: 20–14, 29–13, 44–17, 18–18
Pts: Bowen, Froling 8 Rebs: Froling 11; Asts: Lee 6		Pts: Cameron 9 Rebs: Moors 7 Asts: Cameron 3

Stadium 29, Nonthaburi
Referees: Rabah Noujaim (LBN), Takaki Kato (JPN), Zhang Xiao (CHN)

7 August 2018
15:30

Report

Bahrain	87–71	Thailand
Scoring by quarter: 11–18, 21–14, 26–14, 29–25
Pts: M. Rashed 33; Rebs: Aboukuora 10; Asts: A. Rashed, M. Rashed 4		Pts: Jaimsawad 26; Rebs: Wadman, Thanarojwongsa 5 Asts: Inmaphan, Jaimsawad 4

Stadium 29, Nonthaburi
Referees: Saif Al-Dossari (QAT), Zhang Lei (CHN), Yasuhisa Masubuchi (JPN)

=== Group D ===
Pos	Team	Pld	W	L	PF	PA	PD	Pts	Qualification
1	South Korea	3	3	0	361	247	+114	6	Quarterfinals
2	Chinese Taipei	3	2	1	261	239	+22	5	Playoffs
3	India	3	1	2	275	276	−1	4	Playoffs
4	Syria	3	0	3	187	322	−135	3	Eliminated

Source: FIBA Asia
Rules for classification: 1) Points; 2) Head-to-head results; 3) Points difference; 4) Points scored.

5 August 2018
10:30

Report

South Korea	130–66	Syria
Scoring by quarter: 28–10, 29–15, 40–20, 33–21
Pts: Lee H.J. 24; Rebs: Lee H.J. 9 Asts: 4 players 5		Pts: Al Ghamian 25; Rebs: Al Ghamian 11; Asts: Kassas 4

Thai-Japanese Bangkok Youth Center, Bangkok
Referees: Ricor Buaron (PHI), Yasuhisa Masubuchi (JPN), Lim Wee Chun (MAS)

5 August 2018
15:30

Report

Chinese Taipei	83–80	India
Scoring by quarter: 15–20, 21–19, 20–25, 27–16
Pts: Chen F.P., Lin Y.T. 17; Rebs: Chen F.P. 15; Asts: Lin Y.T. 5		Pts: P. Singh 17; Rebs: P. Singh 15; Asts: Muthu Krishnan 3

Thai-Japanese Bangkok Youth Center, Bangkok
Referees: Harja Jaladri (INA), Jafar Mohammad Pour (IRI), Takaki Kato (JPN)

6 August 2018
12:45

Report

India	95–134	South Korea
Scoring by quarter: 16–34, 28–36, 20–35, 31–29
Pts: Kumar 40; Rebs: Jhawar 8 Asts: Kumar 7		Pts: Lee H.J. 30; Rebs: Lee W.S. 10; Asts: Lee J.H. 15

Stadium 29, Nonthaburi
Referees: Rabah Noujaim (LBN), Zhang Xiao (CHN), Lim Wee Chun (MAS)

6 August 2018
17:45

Report

Syria	62–92	Chinese Taipei
Scoring by quarter: 16–23, 14–9, 16–28, 16–32
Pts: Kassas 20; Rebs: Al Ghamian 13; Asts: Al Ghamian 3		Pts: Lin Y.T. 24; Rebs: Morrison 10; Asts: Gao J.W. 4

Stadium 29, Nonthaburi
Referees: Takaki Kato (JPN), Mohammadreza Salehian (IRI), Chitchanok Srisawat (THA)

7 August 2018
12:45

Report

India	100–59	Syria
Scoring by quarter: 27–13, 22–7, 30–14, 21–25
Pts: Kumar 32; Rebs: H. Tomar 10; Asts: Kumar 5		Pts: Al Ghamian 15; Rebs: Al Ghamian 14; Asts: Nounou 5

Thai-Japanese Bangkok Youth Center, Bangkok
Referees: Harja Jaladri (INA), Jafar Mohammad Pour (IRI), Lim Wee Chun (MAS)

7 August 2018
20:00

Report

South Korea	97–86	Chinese Taipei
Scoring by quarter: 21–21, 25–20, 26–16, 25–29
Pts: Lee H.J. 26; Rebs: Yeo J.S. 14; Asts: Lee H.J. 4		Pts: Ma C.H. 25; Rebs: Morrison 15; Asts: Gao J.W. 5

Stadium 29, Nonthaburi
Referees: Ricor Buaron (PHI), Mohammadreza Salehian (IRI), Yuli Wullandari (INA)

== Final round ==
=== Brackets ===
Qualification round
8 August
New Zealand	109
India	76
8 August
China	102
Indonesia	45
8 August
Chinese Taipei	65
Bahrain	76
8 August
Japan	85
Lebanon	67

Quarterfinals
9 August
Iran	72
New Zealand	87
9 August
South Korea	85
China	90
9 August
Philippines	67
Bahrain	52
9 August
Australia	88
Japan	52

Semifinals
10 August
New Zealand	87
China	82
10 August
Philippines	43
Australia	77

Final
11 August
New Zealand	63
Australia	72
Third place
11 August
China	76
Philippines	57

5-8th place

5–8th-place semifinals
10 August
Iran	89
South Korea	81
10 August
Bahrain	85
Japan (OT)	92

Fifth place
11 August
Iran	58
Japan	60
Seventh place
11 August
South Korea	93
Bahrain	100

=== Qualification round ===
8 August 2018
10:30

Report

China	102–45	Indonesia
Scoring by quarter: 33–10, 24–9, 30–11, 15–15
Pts: Chen H.N. 18; Rebs: Wang Q.Z. 17; Asts: Guo H.W. 13		Pts: Michael 13; Rebs: Gosal 6 Asts: Widyadana 2

Stadium 29, Nonthaburi
Referees: Saif Al-Dossari (QAT), Nattapong Jontapa (THA), Adel Mohamed Ghuloom (BHR)

8 August 2018
12:45

Report

Japan	85–67	Lebanon
Scoring by quarter: 10–22, 29–15, 26–13, 19–17
Pts: Tominaga 28; Rebs: Mitani 7 Asts: Kawamura 11		Pts: Zanbaka 21; Rebs: Zanbaka 9 Asts: Mougharbel 3

Stadium 29, Nonthaburi
Referees: Mohammadreza Salehian (IRI), Chang Lu-yueh (TPE), Lim Wee Chun (MAS)

8 August 2018
15:30

Report

New Zealand	109–76	India
Scoring by quarter: 21–21, 31–21, 32–15, 25–19
Pts: Moors 20; Rebs: Moors 10; Asts: Perrott-Hunt 6		Pts: Bhati 14; Rebs: Singh 9 Asts: Bhati 4

Stadium 29, Nonthaburi
Referees: Rabah Noujaim (LBN), Zhang Xiao (CHN), Chitchanok Srisawat (THA)

8 August 2018
17:45

Report

Chinese Taipei	65–76	Bahrain
Scoring by quarter: 16–26, 23–9, 3–20, 23–21
Pts: Lin Y.T. 19; Rebs: Morrison, Chen F.P. 9 Asts: Lin L. 3		Pts: Ali, Rashed 23; Rebs: Aboukoura 19; Asts: Ali 5

Stadium 29, Nonthaburi
Referees: Harja Jaladri (INA), Wissam Zein (SYR), Takaki Kato (JPN)

=== Quarterfinals ===
9 August 2018
10:30

Report

Iran	72–87	New Zealand
Scoring by quarter: 14–21, 21–17, 15–25, 22–24
Pts: Arabzadeh 19; Rebs: Rezaeifar 10; Asts: Dalirzahan, Taghilou 4		Pts: Moors 26; Rebs: Moors 14; Asts: Cameron 8

Stadium 29, Nonthaburi
Referees: Rabah Noujaim (LBN), Yasuhisa Masubuchi (JPN), Takaki Kato (JPN)

9 August 2018
12:45

Report

Philippines	67–52	Bahrain
Scoring by quarter: 20–11, 6–23, 22–11, 19–7
Pts: Sotto 21; Rebs: Edu 17; Asts: Panopio 8		Pts: Awadh 13; Rebs: Awadh 9 Asts: Rashed 3

Stadium 29, Nonthaburi
Referees: Mohammadreza Salehian (IRI), Matthew Ryan Bathurst (NZL), Zhang Xiao (CHN)

9 August 2018
15:30

Report

Australia	88–52	Japan
Scoring by quarter: 23–13, 19–14, 21–14, 25–11
Pts: Bowen 22; Rebs: Bowen 13; Asts: Wigness 6		Pts: Tominaga 16; Rebs: Yuki 5 Asts: Nakamura, Kawamura 2

Stadium 29, Nonthaburi
Referees: Lee Kyoung-hwan (KOR), Jafar Mohammad Pour (IRI), Suebpong Wichaiphin (THA)

9 August 2018
17:45

Report

South Korea	85–90	China
Scoring by quarter: 13–19, 14–23, 38–21, 20–27
Pts: Lee H.J. 33; Rebs: Lee H.J. 10; Asts: Lee H.J. 6		Pts: Guo H.W. 33; Rebs: Wang Q.Z. 23; Asts: Wang Q.Z. 6

Stadium 29, Nonthaburi
Referees: Harja Jaladri (INA), Toni Caldwell (AUS), Saif Al-Dossari (QAT)

=== 5th-8th-place semifinals ===
10 August 2018
10:30

Report

Iran	89–81	South Korea
Scoring by quarter: 22–11, 17–30, 31–17, 19–23
Pts: Rezaeifar 27; Rebs: Rezaeifar 15; Asts: Dalirzahan 7		Pts: Lee H.J. 24; Rebs: Lee H.J. 9 Asts: Lee H.J. 9

Stadium 29, Nonthaburi
Referees: Zhang Xiao (CHN), Wissam Zein (SYR), Vanessa Ann Devlin (AUS)

10 August 2018
12:45

Report

Bahrain	85–92 (OT)	Japan
Scoring by quarter: 22–13, 17–13, 21–20, 15–29, Overtime: 10–17
Pts: Rashed 29; Rebs: Aboukoura 11; Asts: Hamoda 5		Pts: Tominaga 33; Rebs: Nakamura, Kawamura 6 Asts: Nakamura 10

Stadium 29, Nonthaburi
Referees: Ricor Buaron (PHI), Matthew Ryan Bathurst (NZL), Chitchanok Srisawat (THA)

=== Semifinals ===
10 August 2018
15:30

Report

New Zealand	87–82	China
Scoring by quarter: 21–21, 20–18, 20–21, 26–22
Pts: Darling 24; Rebs: Cameron 10; Asts: Cameron 12		Pts: Guo H.W. 25; Rebs: Wang Q.Z. 8 Asts: Xu, Guo H.W. 5

Stadium 29, Nonthaburi
Referees: Harja Jaladri (INA), Jafar Mohammad Pour (IRI), Takaki Kato (JPN)

10 August 2018
17:45

Report

Philippines	43–77	Australia
Scoring by quarter: 12–14, 8–30, 8–16, 15–17
Pts: Edu 9 Rebs: Edu 10; Asts: 3 players 2		Pts: Froling 12; Rebs: Bowen 8 Asts: Lee, Robertson 3

Stadium 29, Nonthaburi
Referees: Rabah Noujaim (LBN), Mohammadreza Salehian (IRI), Lee Kyoung-hwan (KOR)

=== 7th-place game ===
11 August 2018
10:00

Report

South Korea	93–100	Bahrain
Scoring by quarter: 21–23, 25–27, 27–21, 20–29
Pts: Yeo J.S. 23; Rebs: Lee H.J. 12; Asts: Lee H.J. 7		Pts: Rashed 33; Rebs: Nawaf 11; Asts: Khadem 5

Stadium 29, Nonthaburi
Referees: Zhang Xiao (CHN), Wissam Zein (SYR), Suebpong Wichaiphin (THA)

=== 5th-place game ===
11 August 2018
12:15

Report

Iran	58–60	Japan
Scoring by quarter: 9–18, 13–11, 20–16, 16–15
Pts: Rezaeifar, Taghilou 10; Rebs: Rezaeifar 14; Asts: Dalirzahan 6		Pts: Kawamura 18; Rebs: Nakamura 7 Asts: Kawamura, Nakamura 3

Stadium 29, Nonthaburi
Referees: Lee Kyoung-hwan (KOR), Toni Caldwell (AUS), Adel Mohamed Ghuloom (BHR)

=== Bronze-medal match ===
11 August 2018

Report

China	76–57	Philippines
Scoring by quarter: 27–14, 16–12, 16–17, 17–14
Pts: Wang Q.Z 27; Rebs: Wang Q.Z 14; Asts: Xu 7		Pts: Sotto 16; Rebs: Sotto, Edu 8 Asts: Panopio, Ildefonso 2

Stadium 29, Nonthaburi
Referees: Harja Jaladri (INA), Chang Lu-yueh (TPE), Vanessa Ann Devlin (AUS)

=== Final ===
11 August 2018
16:45

Report

New Zealand	63–72	Australia
Scoring by quarter: 11–26, 15–11, 24–20, 13–15
Pts: Darling 20; Rebs: Darling 8 Asts: Cameron 5		Pts: Stattmann 17; Rebs: Bowen 10; Asts: Wigness 3

Stadium 29, Nonthaburi
Referees: Rabah Noujaim (LBN), Ricor Buaron (PHI), Takaki Kato (JPN)

== Statistical leaders ==
=== Players ===
Points

Pos.	Name	PPG
1	(South Korea) Lee Hyun-jung	26.0
2	(India) Rajeev Kumar	22.0
3	(Bahrain) Ahmad Rashed	21.5
4	(China) Wang Quanze	20.0
5	(Japan) Keisei Tominaga	19.3

Rebounds

Pos.	Name	RPG
1	(China) Wang Quanze	13.0
2	(Philippines) Ariel John Edu	11.5
3	(Iran) Amirhossein Rezaeifar	11.3
3	(Chinese Taipei) Jonah Morrison	11.3
5	(South Korea) Lee Hyun-jung	10.3

Assists

Pos.	Name	APG
1	(South Korea) Lee Hyun-jung	6.0
2	(New Zealand) Flynn Macpherson Cameron	5.6
3	(China) Guo Haowen	5.4
4	(China) Xu Jie	4.9
5	(Iran) Ehsan Dalirzahan	4.3
5	(Australia) Tamuri Wigness	4.3

Steals

Pos.	Name	SPG
1	(South Korea) Lee Hyun-jung	3.3
2	(India) Rajeev Kumar	3.0
3	(Chinese Taipei) Lin Lin	2.5
3	(Chinese Taipei) Lin Yan-ting	2.5
5	(New Zealand) Flynn Macpherson Cameron	2.4

Blocks

Pos.	Name	BPG
1	(India) Princepal Singh	3.3
2	(Philippines) Ariel John Edu	2.8
3	(Iran) Amirhossein Rezaeifar	2.3
4	(Australia) Samson Froling	2.0
4	(Lebanon) Ameer Kasab	2.0
4	(Chinese Taipei) Jonah Morrison	2.0
4	(India) Harshwardhan Tomar	2.0

Other statistical leaders

Stat	Name	Avg.
Field goal percentage	(Australia) Kyle Bowen	70.4%
3-point FG percentage	(South Korea) Park Moo-been	53.8%
Free throw percentage	(Japan) Keisei Tominaga	85.7%
Turnovers	(India) Arvind Krishnan	5.5
Fouls	(Chinese Taipei) Lin Cheng	4.3

== Final rankings ==
Qualified for the 2019 FIBA Under-19 Basketball World Cup

Position	Team	Record
1st place, gold medalist(s)	Australia	6–0
2nd place, silver medalist(s)	New Zealand	5–2
3rd place, bronze medalist(s)	China	5–2
4th	Philippines	4–2
5th	Japan	5–2
6th	Iran	4–2
7th	Bahrain	3–4
8th	South Korea	3–3
9th	Chinese Taipei	2–2
10th	Lebanon	1–3
11th	India	1–3
12th	Indonesia	1–3
13th	Kazakhstan	0–3
14th	Thailand	0–3
15th	Syria	0–3
16th	United Arab Emirates	0–3
