= Michael Wang (basketball) =

Chinese basketball player

Personal information
- Born: June 8, 2000 (age 26) Taiyuan, Shanxi, China
- Listed height: 6 ft 10 in (2.08 m)
- Listed weight: 220 lb (100 kg)

Career information
- High school: Mater Dei (Santa Ana, California)
- College: Penn (2018–2022)
- Playing career: 2022–2024
- Position: Power forward

Career history
- 2022–2024: Guangzhou Loong Lions
- 2024: Xinjiang Flying Tigers

Career statistics
- Points: 72 (4.5 ppg)
- Rebounds: 30 (1.9 rpg)
- Blocks: 4 (0.3 bpg)
Medals
Men's basketball
Representing China
FIBA Asia Under-18 Championship
Bronze medal – third place	2018 Nonthaburi

Wang Quanze (Chinese: 王泉泽; pinyin: Wáng Quánzé; born June 8, 2000), known as Michael Wang, is a former Chinese professional basketball player who last played for the Xinjiang Flying Tigers of the Chinese Basketball Association (CBA). He was a member of the China national under-19 team in 2018, during this time, he also attended the Wharton School of the University of Pennsylvania) played college basketball for the University's team named the Quakers, which plays in the Ivy League.

== Early life ==
Wang was born in Taiyuan, Shanxi, but spent part of his childhood in Beijing, where he played basketball at Beijing No. 4 Junior High School.

== High school career ==
Wang moved to the United States at age 14. He enrolled at Mater Dei High School in Santa Ana, California and played power forward for the majority of his high school career. While in high school, he lived with teammate Spencer Freedman's family.

After graduating from high school, Wang played in the Amateur Athletic Union in the summer of 2018.

== College career ==
In 2018, Wang enrolled in the Wharton School at the University of Pennsylvania. During his freshman year with the Quakers, Wang averaged 8.5 points and 3.6 rebounds per game. On December 4, 2018, Wang scored a career-high 23 points off the bench in an 89–75 upset win over Miami. Wang missed the entirety of his sophomore season due to knee tendonitis.

== Professional career ==
Wang signed with Chinese Basketball Association's Guangzhou Loong Lions in 2021, though the team allowed him to complete his senior season at Penn between 2021 and 2022. In 2022, the team signed a 3-year contract with him, though he was injured ahead of the 2022–23 season and did not play. He debuted for the team on 1 November 2023 in a 104–117 loss against Beijing Royal Fighters, clocking in for 2 minutes as a substitute.

Wang was traded to Xinjiang Flying Tigers in a player swap deal on 21 January 2024. He would be part of the Xinjiang team that advanced to the finals of the 2023–24 Chinese Basketball Association season, but the team lost 0–4 against Liaoning Flying Leopards in the finals. Wang left the team as a free agent at the end of the 2023–24 season. Wang has not played professionally since.

== National team career ==
Wang competed for the China national under-19 basketball team in the 2018 FIBA Under-18 Asian Championship. During the tournament, he averaged 20 points, 13 rebounds, 3.6 assists, and 1.3 steals per game en route to the team's third-place finish. He led the tournament in rebounds and was selected in the team of the tournament.

== Career statistics ==
Legend
GP	Games played	GS	Games started	MPG	Minutes per game
FG%	Field goal percentage	3P%	3-point field goal percentage	FT%	Free throw percentage
RPG	Rebounds per game	APG	Assists per game	SPG	Steals per game
BPG	Blocks per game	PPG	Points per game	**Bold**	Career high

=== College ===
Year	Team	GP	GS	MPG	FG%	3P%	FT%	RPG	APG	SPG	BPG	PPG
2018–19	Penn	26	9	18.1	.455	.310	.708	3.6	1.1	.5	.2	8.5
2021–22	Penn	8	3	14.9	.404	.118	.600	2.1	1.3	.1	.0	6.4
Career		34	12	17.4	.443	.277	.698	3.3	1.1	.2	.4	8.0

=== CBA ===
==== Regular season ====
Year	Team	GP	GS	MPG	FG%	3P%	FT%	RPG	APG	SPG	BPG	PPG
2023–24	Guangzhou	3	0	4.3	.429	.667	.500	1.3	.0	.0	.0	3.0
2023–24	Xinjiang	13	0	12.1	.540	.375	.000	2.0	.7	.2	.2	4.8
Career		16	0	10.6	.526	.407	.500	1.9	.6	.2	.2	4.5

==== Playoffs ====
Year	Team	GP	GS	MPG	FG%	3P%	FT%	RPG	APG	SPG	BPG	PPG
2023–24	Xinjiang	6	0	4.5	.167	.000	.750	1.2	.0	.0	.2	0.8
