= United Arab Emirates men's national under-17 basketball team =

United Arab Emirates
- FIBA zone: FIBA Asia
- National federation: UAEBA

U17 World Cup
- Appearances: 1 (2014)
- Medals: None

U16 Asia Cup
- Appearances: None

The United Arab Emirates men's national under-17 basketball team is a national basketball team of the United Arab Emirates, administered by the United Arab Emirates Basketball Association. It represents the country in men's international under-17 basketball competitions.

== FIBA U16 Asia Cup ==
The team has yet to qualify for the FIBA U16 Asia Cup.

== FIBA U17 World Cup ==
They have made one appearance at the FIBA Under-17 Basketball World Cup in 2014 as the host, where they finished in 16th place.

Year	Position
(Germany) 2010	Did not qualify
(Lithuania) 2012	Did not qualify
(United Arab Emirates) 2014	16th
(Spain) 2016	Did not qualify
(Argentina) 2018	Did not qualify
(Spain) 2022	Did not qualify
(Turkey) 2024	Did not qualify
(Turkey) 2026	To be determined
(Greece) 2028	To be determined
Total	1/9

== See also ==
- United Arab Emirates men's national basketball team
- United Arab Emirates men's national under-18 basketball team
