= United Arab Emirates Basketball Association =

Governing body of basketball

- Founded: 1976
- Affiliation: FIBA
- Affiliation date: 1976
- Regional affiliation: FIBA Asia
- Headquarters: Dubai
- President: Ismail Al Gergawi

Official website
- uae.basketball

The United Arab Emirates Basketball Association (Arabic: اتحاد الإمارات العربية المتحدة لكرة السلة) is the governing body of basketball in the United Arab Emirates. It was founded in 1976, and are headquartered in Dubai.

The United Arab Emirates Basketball Association operates the UAE national team, and the youth national teams. They organize national competitions in the United Arab Emirates, for the senior national team and also the youth national basketball teams.

The top professional league in the United Arab Emirates is the UAE National Basketball League.

== See also ==
- United Arab Emirates men's national basketball team
- United Arab Emirates men's national under-18 basketball team
- United Arab Emirates men's national under-17 basketball team
