= Lee Hyun-jung (basketball) =

South Korean basketball player (born 2000)

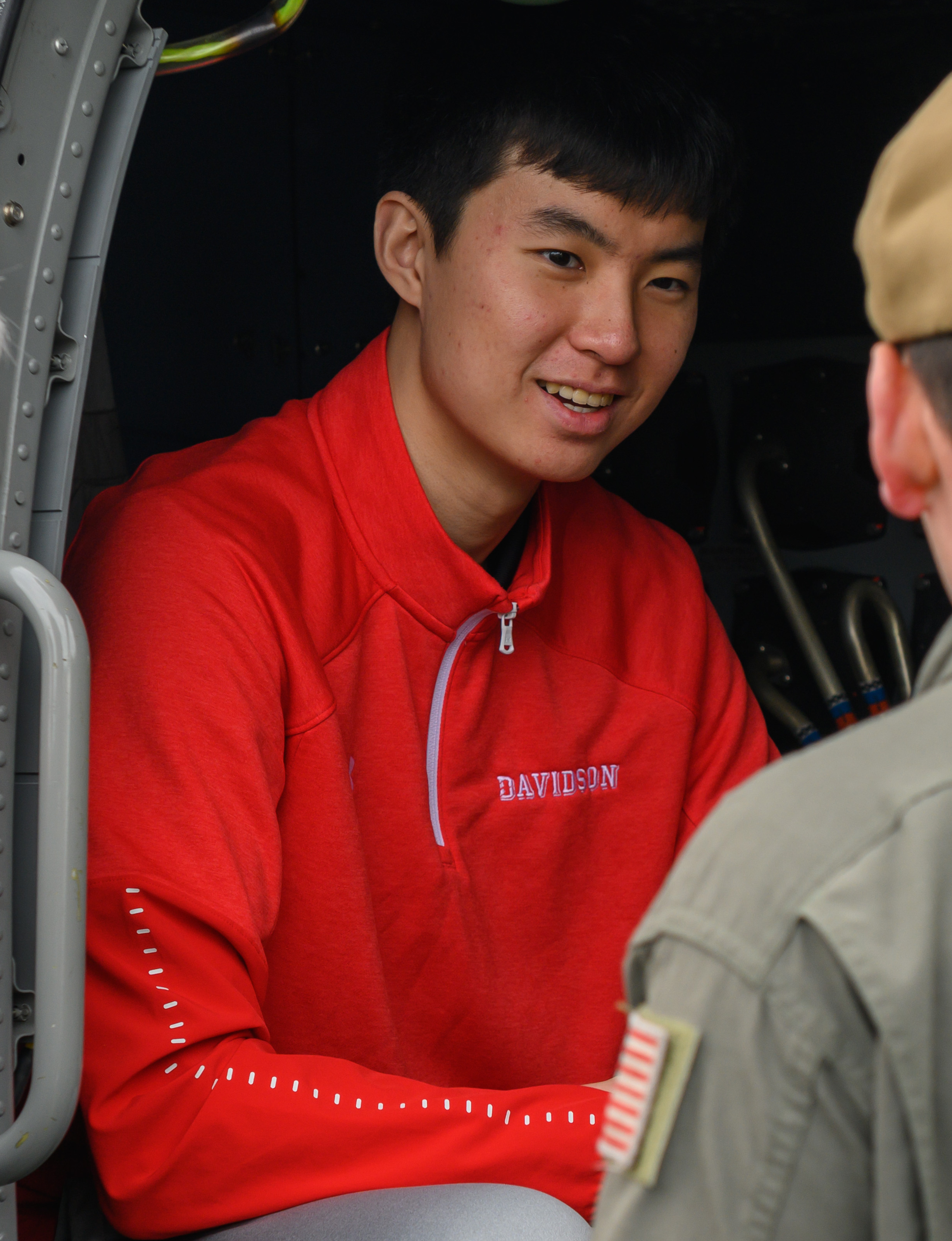
- Lee at the United States Naval Academy in 2019

No. 31 – Rip City Remix
- Position: Shooting guard / small forward
- League: NBA G League

Personal information
- Born: October 23, 2000 (age 26) Seongnam, South Korea
- Listed height: 6 ft 7 in (2.01 m)
- Listed weight: 210 lb (95 kg)

Career information
- High school: Samil Commercial (Suwon, Gyeonggi Province); Lake Ginninderra (Canberra, Australia)
- College: Davidson (2019–2022)
- NBA draft: 2022: undrafted
- Playing career: 2018–present

Career history
- 2018–2019: BA Centre of Excellence
- 2023: Santa Cruz Warriors
- 2023–2025: Illawarra Hawks
- 2024: Osaka Evessa
- 2025–2026: Nagasaki Velca
- 2026–present: Rip City Remix

Career highlights
- NBL champion (2025); First-team All-Atlantic 10 (2022); Atlantic 10 All-Rookie Team (2020)
- Stats at NBA.com
- Stats at Basketball Reference
Medals
Men's basketball
Representing South Korea
Asian Games
Gold medal – first place	2026 Aichi–Nagoya	Team
FIBA Asia Under-16 Championship
Gold medal – first place	2015 Indonesia	Team

Lee Hyun-jung (born October 23, 2000) is a South Korean professional basketball player for the Rip City Remix of the NBA G League. He played college basketball for the Davidson Wildcats of the Atlantic 10 Conference (A-10). He helped the Illawarra Hawks of the Australian National Basketball League (NBL) win the NBL championship in 2025.

== Early life and career ==
Lee attended Samil Commercial School in Suwon, where he played basketball under the coaching of his father. In middle school, Lee was only 170 centimeters (5 ft 7 in) and played as a guard, as he practiced dribbling and mid-range shooting. By the end of his middle school years, Lee grew to over 190 centimeters (6 ft 3 in). He played as a center during defense and a guard during the offense. He modeled his game after Klay Thompson.

In 2018, Lee enrolled at the NBA Global Academy in Canberra, Australia. While at the academy, he played for the BA Centre of Excellence in the South East Australian Basketball League (SEABL) in 2018 and then the NBL1 in 2019. In conjunction with the NBA Global Academy and the Centre of Excellence, he attended Lake Ginninderra Secondary College, where he learned to speak English.

Lee committed to playing college basketball for Davidson over an offer from Washington State. He drew the attention of head coach Bob McKillop and his staff at a Basketball Without Borders event. He would become the fourth player and the second men's player from South Korea to play NCAA Division I basketball.

== College career ==
As a freshman with the Davidson Wildcats in 2019–20, Lee appeared in 28 games off the bench and finished seventh among A-10 first-year players in scoring, averaging 8.4 points per game. On February 7, 2020, he scored a season-high 20 points in a 73–62 loss to VCU. He was subsequently named to the Atlantic 10 All-Rookie Team.

As a sophomore in 2020–21, Lee started all 22 games and finished second on the team in scoring and assists. He became the first-ever Wildcat to conclude the season shooting at least 50 percent overall, 40 percent from three-point range and 90 percent from the free throw line. He twice scored a season-high 23 points. He averaged 13.5 points, 4.0 rebounds and 2.5 assists per game.

As a junior in 2021–22, Lee played in 34 games and made 33 starts, averaging 15.8 points, 6.0 rebounds and 1.9 assists per game. On December 1, 2021, he recorded a career-high 32 points and 14 rebounds against Charlotte. He was subsequently named first-team All-Atlantic 10.

On April 26, 2022, Lee declared for the NBA draft, forgoing his remaining college eligibility.

== Professional career ==
=== Santa Cruz Warriors (2023) ===
After suffering a foot injury, Lee went undrafted in the 2022 NBA draft.

On February 20, 2023, Lee was acquired by the Santa Cruz Warriors of the NBA G League. In 12 games to complete the 2022–23 season, he averaged 5.5 points, 4.3 rebounds and 1.7 assists per game.

Lee played for the Philadelphia 76ers in the 2023 NBA Summer League.

=== Illawarra Hawks and Osaka Evessa (2023–2025) ===
On July 11, 2023, Lee signed a three-year deal with the Illawarra Hawks of the Australian National Basketball League (NBL). On January 20, 2024, he scored a career-high 24 points on 5-of-8 three-point shooting in a 96–89 loss to the Adelaide 36ers.

On March 19, 2024, Lee signed with the Osaka Evessa of the B.League. His contract expired on May 31, 2024.

Lee returned to the Illawarra Hawks for the 2024–25 NBL season and helped the team win the NBL championship. He parted ways with the Hawks in July 2025, after his contract was bought out by a Japanese club. In 69 games for the Hawks, he averaged 7.6 points, 2.3 rebounds, and 1.1 assists, connecting on 38% of his three-point attempts.

=== Nagasaki Velca (2025–present) ===
On July 30, 2025, Lee signed with the Nagasaki Velca of the B.League. He helped the Velca win the championship and was named Championship MVP.

For the 2026 NBA Summer League, Lee played for the San Antonio Spurs. In five games, Lee averaged 9.2 points, 3.6 rebounds, and 0.6 assists. Following his Summer League performance, Lee signed an Exhibit 10 contract with the Portland Trail Blazers.

== National team career ==
Lee played for South Korea's junior national team at the 2015 FIBA Asia Under-16 Championship. He averaged 14 points and 5.7 rebounds per game, leading his team to its first gold medal at the tournament. Lee represented South Korea at the 2016 FIBA Under-17 World Championship and 2018 FIBA Under-18 Asian Championship. He averaged 26 points, 10.3 rebounds, and 6 assists per game at the 2018 tournament. He played for the senior team at the 2020 FIBA Men's Olympic Qualifying Tournaments and during the 2022 FIBA Asia Cup qualifiers. At the 2026 Asian Games tournament, Lee represented South Korea and won a gold medal with the team after averaging 24 points, 9.7 rebounds, and 2.3 steals across six games.

== Personal life ==
Lee's mother, Sung Jung-a, won a silver medal while representing South Korea in basketball at the 1984 Summer Olympics. His father, Lee Yoon-hwan, played semi-professionally before becoming a high school athletic director and coach. His older sister, Lee Ri-na, played for the South Korean under-16 national team.

== Career statistics ==
Legend
GP	Games played	GS	Games started	MPG	Minutes per game
FG%	Field goal percentage	3P%	3-point field goal percentage	FT%	Free throw percentage
RPG	Rebounds per game	APG	Assists per game	SPG	Steals per game
BPG	Blocks per game	PPG	Points per game	**Bold**	Career high

=== College ===
Year	Team	GP	GS	MPG	FG%	3P%	FT%	RPG	APG	SPG	BPG	PPG
2019–20	Davidson	28	0	20.9	.467	.377	.857	3.1	.8	.6	.1	8.4
2020–21	Davidson	22	22	29.9	**.508**	**.442**	**.900**	4.0	**2.5**	.5	**.4**	13.5
2021–22	Davidson	**34**	**33**	**32.1**	.474	.381	.777	**6.0**	1.9	**.7**	.3	**15.8**
Career		84	55	27.8	.481	.397	.823	4.5	1.7	.6	.2	12.7

=== NBA G League ===
Year	Team	GP	GS	MPG	FG%	3P%	FT%	RPG	APG	SPG	BPG	PPG
2022–23	Santa Cruz	12	0	17.6	.319	.292	.600	4.2	1.7	.8	.3	5.5
Career		12	0	17.6	.319	.292	.600	4.2	1.7	.8	.3	5.5

=== Japan B.League ===
Year	Team	League	GP	MPG	FG%	3P%	FT%	RPG	APG	SPG	BPG	PPG
2023–24	(Japan) Osaka Evessa	B.League	16	27.5	.435	.375	.639	5.5	2.6	.9	**.5**	15.3
2025–26	(Japan) Nagasaki Velca	B.League	**57**	**29.6**	**.565**	**.479**	**.820**	**5.6**	**2.7**	**1.2**	**.5**	**17.4**
