= Bahrain men's national under-18 basketball team =

Bahrain
- FIBA zone: FIBA Asia
- National federation: Bahrain Basketball Association

U19 World Cup
- Appearances: None

U18 Asia Cup
- Appearances: 7
- Medals: None

The Bahrain men's national under-18 basketball team is a national basketball team of Bahrain, administered by the Bahrain Basketball Association. It represents the country in international under-18 men's basketball competitions.

== FIBA U18 Asia Cup participations ==
Year	Result
1977	9th
1978	9th
1980	8th
1982	7th
2012	12th
2018	7th
2026	9th

== See also ==
- Bahrain men's national basketball team
- Bahrain men's national under-16 basketball team
