= Hussain Ahmed (basketball) =

Emirati basketball player (born 1989)

Al Shabab Dubai
- Position: Point guard
- League: UAE National Basketball League

Personal information
- Born: June 6, 1989 (age 37) Abu Dhabi
- Listed height: 5 ft 11 in (1.80 m)

Career information
- Playing career: 2010–present

Career history
- 2010–present: Al Shabab Dubai

Hussain Ahmed (Arabic: حسين أحمد) (born 6 June 1989) is an Emirati professional basketball player. He currently plays for Al Shabab Dubai of the UAE National Basketball League.

He represented the UAE's national basketball team at the 2011 FIBA Asia Championship in Wuhan, China, where he was the team's best free throw shooter.
